= Dual County League =

High school athletic conference in Massachusetts, US

- Conference: Massachusetts Interscholastic Athletic Association
- Founded: 1946
- Division: MIAA Division I
- No. of teams: 11
- Headquarters: Massachusetts
- Region: New England
- Website: https://www.dualcountyleague.org/g5-bin/client.cgi?G5genie=241

The Dual County League (DCL) is a dual county high school athletic conference in District 4 of the Massachusetts Interscholastic Athletic Association (MIAA). The conference serves schools from Middlesex County and Suffolk County.

The league was founded in 1946 by schools Ashland, Dover-Sherborne, Medfield, Millis, Wayland, Weston, and Westwood; the name deriving from the counties of Middlesex and Norfolk.

== History ==
The original seven schools founded the league in 1946 for the upcoming basketball season. Ashland was the first to leave in 1948, replacing them the following year would be Norfolk County Agricultural High School. Sudbury high school joined in 1951, and would become Lincoln-Sudbury Regional High School three years later. Medfield and Westwood left in 1957, with the newly founded Bedford High School replacing them. The following year Dover-Sherborne, Millis and Norfolk Agricultural left the league; in 1959 Lynnfield High School and a returning Ashland replaced them. This stretched the borders of the league all the way up to Essex County.

Dual County League
Locations of Dual County League members, 2021-2022 full member

The beginning of the '60s saw Acton-Boxborough Regional High School and Holliston High School join the league, however Holliston would leave after their first year. North Reading High School and a returning Westwood replaced Holliston in 1961; Westwood becoming the sole school from Norfolk County in the league. North Reading only stayed until 1966, however.

Ashland, after having to constantly punch above their weight class, left for good in 1970 to the Tri-Valley League. Replacing them was Newton South High School, who had already been playing Hockey in the league for multiple years. Concord-Carlisle High School and Maynard High School joined in 1973, replacing Lynnfield who left for the Cape Ann League and Westwood who left for the Tri-Valley League. Maynard's stay would be short-lived, however, and they would return to the Midland League the following year in 1974.

With departures of Lynnfield and Westwood, only schools from the Middlesex County made up the league. This would change in 1982, with Boston Latin School beginning their transition from the Boston City League to the DCL. This made them the only school from Suffolk County.

In 1992, Westford Academy left the newly formed Midland Wachusett League for the Dual County. The league remained unchanged for 15 years until Tyngsborough High School made the jump from the lower division Commonwealth Athletic Conference. Additionally, Arlington High School began their transition to the DCL the same year from the Greater Boston League which would be completed in 2008. Waltham High School quickly joined in 2008, and the large size of the league caused it to split into two divisions based on size. The large division consisted of Acton-Boxborough, Boston Latin, Lincoln-Sudbury, Newton South, Waltham and Westford. The small division consisted of Arlington, Bedford, Concord-Carlisle, Tyngsborough, Wayland, and Weston.

By 2011, Arlington and Tyngsborough were having trouble competing against the many larger schools, and left to the Middlesex and Midland-Wachusett, respectively. Finally, in 2014 Cambridge Rindge and Latin School left the Greater Boston League to become the most recent member of the Dual County.

The league no longer has two divisions, and Weston is currently an independent in football.

== Member schools ==
The following eleven schools are a member of the Dual County League.

School	Location	Colors	Nickname	Type	Year Joined	Year founded	Enrollment
Acton-Boxborough Regional High School	Acton, Massachusetts	Blue & Gold	Revolution	public secondary	1960	1955	1,951
Bedford High School	Bedford, Massachusetts	Blue & White	Buccaneers	public secondary	1957	1955	829
Boston Latin School	Boston, Massachusetts	Purple & White	Wolfpack	public exam secondary	1982	1635	2,383
Cambridge Rindge and Latin School	Cambridge, Massachusetts	Black, Silver, & White	Falcons	public secondary	2014	1648	1,836
Concord-Carlisle High School	Concord, Massachusetts	Maroon & White	Patriots	public secondary	1973	1852	1,300
Lincoln-Sudbury Regional High School	Sudbury, Massachusetts	Navy Blue & White	Warriors	public secondary	1951	1954	1,641
Newton South High School	Newton, Massachusetts	Blue & Orange	Lions	public secondary	1970	1960	1,740
Waltham High School	Waltham, Massachusetts	Red & White	Hawks	public secondary	2008	1968	1,375
Wayland High School	Wayland, Massachusetts	Orange & Black	Warriors	public secondary	1946	1854	870
Westford Academy	Westford, Massachusetts	Maroon & Grey	Ghosts	public secondary	1992	1792	1,651
Weston High School	Weston, Massachusetts	Maroon, Grey, & White	Wildcats	public secondary	1946	1932	757

== Former members ==
School	Location	Colors	Nickname	Years in League	Current League
Arlington High School	Arlington, Massachusetts	Maroon, Grey, & White	Spy Ponders	2008-2011	Middlesex League
Ashland High School	Ashland, Massachusetts	Blue, White, & Red	Clockers	1946-1948, 1959-1970	Tri-Valley League
Dover-Sherborn High School	Dover, Massachusetts	Blue, White, & Black	Raiders	1946-1959	Tri-Valley League
Holliston High School	Holliston, Massachusetts	Red & White	Panthers	1960-1961	Tri-Valley League
Lynnfield High School	Lynnfield, Massachusetts	Blue & Gold	Pioneers	1959-1973	Cape Ann League
Maynard High School	Maynard, Massachusetts	Orange & Black	Tigers	1973-1974	Midland Wachusett League
Medfield High School	Medfield, Massachusetts	Blue, White, & Carolina Blue	Warriors	1946-1956	Tri-Valley League
Millis High School	Millis, Massachusetts	Maroon & Silver	Mohawks	1946-1958	Tri-Valley League
Norfolk County Agricultural High School	Walpole, Massachusetts	Blue & Gold	Rams	1949-1958	Mayflower League
North Reading High School	North Reading, Massachusetts	Green & Gold	Hornets	1961-1966	Cape Ann League
Tyngsborough High School	Tyngsborough, Massachusetts	Red, Black, & White	Tigers	2007-2011	Midland Wachusett League
Westwood High School	Westwood, Massachusetts	Forest Green & White	Wolverines	1946-1957, 1961-1973	Tri-Valley League

== State championships ==
This is a list of MIAA state championships won by schools while a part of the DCL

=== Football ===
Note: From 1972 to 2012, football state championships were separated by region, so there would be multiple champions from each division. From 1972 to 1977 and from 1997 to 2008, it was split between Eastern Mass and Central/Western Mass and there would be two champions in each division. From 1978 to 1996 and from 2009 to 2012 Central and Western Mass split so there would be three champions in each division. In 2013 everything was combined and therefore only allowed one state champion per division.

- Acton-Boxborough: 1994 D2B Eastern; 2001-2003 D2 Eastern; 2004 D1A Eastern
- Concord-Carlisle: 1978, 2011 D3 Eastern
- Lincoln-Sudbury: 1985, 1986, 1989 D3 Eastern
- Wayland: 2006 D1A Eastern
- Westford: 1993 D3B Eastern
- Weston: 1991, 1998 D6A Eastern; 1996 D6B Eastern

=== Cross country ===
==== Boys ====
- Weston: 1990 D2, 2026 D2 (Foley Division)
- Concord-Carlisle: 2018 D1
- Cambridge R&L: 2026 D1 (Thorpe Division)

==== Girls ====
- Concord-Carlisle: 2017, 2019 D1
- Lincoln-Sudbury: 2007, 2009 D1
- Newton South: 1993, 2008 D1
- Weston: 2022 D3
- Westford: 2024 D1

=== Field hockey ===
- Acton-Boxborough: 2000, 2007, 2009, 2012, 2014, 2015 D1
- Weston: 2008 D1

=== Fall volleyball ===
- Weston: 2023 D3

=== Soccer ===
==== Boys ====
- Concord-Carlisle: 2006, 2009, 2010, 2014, 2017 D2; 2023 D1
- Lincoln-Sudbury: 2002 D2; 2015 D1
- Wayland: 2001 D3
- Westford: 1992 D2
- Weston: 2009 D3

==== Girls ====
- Acton-Boxborough: 2007 D1
- Concord-Carlisle: 1979, 1980 D1, 1990 D2
- Lincoln-Sudbury: 2003 D1
- Weston: 1997 (Co-Champs with Sutton High School), 2010, 2012 D3

==== Fall golf ====
- Bedford: 1998 D3
- Concord-Carlisle: 2008 D2
- Lincoln-Sudbury: 1996, 2019 D1; 2007 D2
- Wayland: 2009 D3; 2014 D2
- Weston: 2007, 2008, 2010, 2013-2016, 2022, 2023 D3

=== Fall swim & dive ===
==== Girls ====
- Acton-Boxborough: 1982-1987, 1991-1998; 2021, 2022 D1
- Bedford: 1974, 1975
- Wayland: 1973

=== Basketball ===
==== Boys ====
- Acton-Boxborough: 1970, 1971 Class D
- Cambridge R&L: 2016, 2017 D1
- Wayland: 1947 Class C; 1957, 1958 Class D; 1981 D2; 1991 D3
- Weston: 1955 Class D; 1998 D3
- Westwood: 1962 Class D

==== Girls ====
- Concord-Carlisle: 2001 D2
- Lincoln-Sudbury: 2007 D2

=== Winter swim & dive ===
==== Boys ====
- Acton-Boxborough: 1988-1995, 2000 D1
- Lincoln-Sudbury: 1987 D1; 1998 D2
- Wayland: 2009, 2010, 2017-2020, 2025, 2026 D2
- Westford: 2015, 2023 D1
- Weston: 1983 D1; 1986-1990,1993-1995, 1997, 1999-2008, 2012-2016, 2022-2024 D2

==== Girls ====
- Concord-Carlisle: 2024-2026 D1
- Lincoln-Sudbury: 2009, 2011, 2015, 2023 D1
- Wayland: 2006-2009, 2012-2014, 2019 D2
- Westford: 2012-2014, 2016-2020, 2022 D1
- Weston: 2015, 2024-2026 D2

=== Gymnastics ===
- Lincoln-Sudbury: 1978 (Co-Champs with Somerset Berkley Regional High School)
- Westford: 1993

=== Ice hockey ===
==== Boys ====
- Acton-Boxborough: 1974 D2
- Boston Latin: 2005, 2024 D2
- Waltham: 2018 D1
- Weston: 2024 (Co-Champs with Dover-Sherborn High School)

==== Girls ====
- Boston Latin: 2002 D1
- Westford: 2004 D2

=== Alpine ski ===
==== Boys ====
- Acton-Boxborough: 1983, 1984
- Lincoln-Sudbury: 1990, 2001, 2002, 2004, 2012

==== Girls ====
- Concord-Carlisle: 1984
- Lincoln-Sudbury: 1985-1988, 2016
- Westford: 2012

=== Nordic ski ===
==== Boys ====
- Concord-Carlisle: 1983-1986, 2018, 2019
- Lincoln-Sudbury: 2010
- Newton South: 2024

==== Girls ====
- Concord-Carlisle: 1983-1986, 2019 (Co-Champs with Mount Greylock Regional School), 2022, 2023
- Lincoln-Sudbury: 1991, 2013, 2014

=== Indoor track & field ===
==== Boys ====
- Acton-Boxborough: 2012, 2024 D1
- Bedford: 1990 Class D (Co-Champs with Bishop Stang High School)
- Lincoln-Sudbury: 1985, 1986 Class B
- Wayland: 1993-1995 Class D; 2003 D3
- Weston: 1973, 1991, 1997 Class D; 2019 D5
- Westford: 2002 Class B (Co-Champs with Natick High School)
- Westwood: 1972 Class D

==== Girls ====
- Acton-Boxborough: 2006, 2007 D1
- Concord-Carlisle: 2017 D3; 2020 All-State
- Lincoln-Sudbury: 1988 Class B; 2008 D1
- Newton South: 1993, 1994 Class B; 2003, 2004 D2; 2009, 2017 D1
- Weston: 1997, 1998 Class D; 2022, 2023 D5; 2026 D4
- Westford: 2008, 2026 D2

=== Wrestling ===
==== Boys ====
- Weston: 1998 D3
- Wayland: 2006, 2010 D3

=== Baseball ===
- Lincoln-Sudbury: 2005 D2; 2007, 2011 D1

=== Softball ===
- Bedford: 1990 D3

=== Outdoor track & field ===
==== Boys ====
- Acton-Boxborough: 2021 All-State

==== Girls ====
- Cambridge R&L: 2015 All-State
- Lincoln-Sudbury: 2006, 2007 All-State
- Newton South: 2008 All-State
- Weston: 2022, 2025, 2026 D5
- Westford: 2021 All-State

=== Lacrosse ===
==== Boys ====
- Acton-Boxborough: 2014 D1
- Concord-Carlisle: 1982, 1987, 1998 All-State; 2012, 2021 D2
- Lincoln-Sudbury: 1978, 1991, 1994 All-State; 2015-2017, 2019 D1
- Weston: 2011 D3

==== Girls ====
- Concord-Carlisle: 2025, 2026 D1
- Acton-Boxborough: 1987 Eastern Mass. D2
- Lincoln-Sudbury: 1988 Eastern Mass. D1; 2023 D1
- Wayland: 1987 Eastern Mass. D1; 1990, 1991 Cross-Division

=== Spring volleyball ===
- Lincoln-Sudbury: 2011
- Newton South: 2014
- Wayland: 2026 D2

=== Tennis ===
==== Boys ====
- Acton-Boxborough: 2017, 2022 D1
- Bedford: 2002 D2
- Concord-Carlisle: 1992, 1999-2001 D2; 1993, 2008, 2009 D1; 2019, 2021, 2022 Eastern Mass D2
- Lincoln-Sudbury: 1986-1988, 1990-1992 D1
- Newton South: 1967 All-State; 1978 Class A; 1997 D1
- Wayland: 1993, 1994 D1; 2012 D2; 2015, 2017 Eastern Mass D2
- Weston: 1974-1976 Class A; 2010, 2011 D1; 2017-2019, 2021, 2026 D3; 2022, 2023 D4

==== Girls ====
- Acton-Boxborough: 2008, 2012, 2013, 2018, 2019, 2021 D1
- Boston Latin: 2001-2003 D1
- Concord-Carlisle: 1984-1988, 1990-1994, 2004, 2005 D1; 2012-2014 D2; 2015 Eastern Mass D2
- Newton South: 1976, 1977 All-State; 2026 D1
- Westford: 2010, 2011 D1
- Weston: 1978 All-State; 2010, 2019 D3
