= Medfield High School =

Location
- 88R South Street; Medfield, Massachusetts 02052; United States
- Coordinates: 42.185°N 71.296°W

Information
- Other name: Amos Clark Kingsbury High School
- Type: Public high school
- School district: Medfield Public Schools
- Superintendent: Jeffrey J. Marsden
- NCES School ID: 250753001157
- Principal: Robert Parga
- Teaching staff: 55.3
- Grades: 9-12
- Enrollment: 704 (2024-2025)
- Student to teacher ratio: 12.7
- Colors: Blue White and Carolina Blue
- Athletics conference: Tri-Valley League (TVL)
- Mascot: Warrior
- Team name: Medfield Warriors
- Newspaper: The Kingsbury Chronicle
- Website: www.medfield.net/o/medfield-high-school

Medfield High School is a 9–12 public high school in Medfield, Massachusetts, part of Norfolk County, Massachusetts, United States. It is one of five public schools in the school system, and the only public high school in Medfield.

In 2019, U.S. News & World Report ranked Medfield as the 20th best High School in Massachusetts and number 610 nationally. In 2024-25, the student to teacher ratio at the high school was 12.7:1. There were 704 students at the school, 51.1% of which were male, 48.9% female.

== Student ethnicity ==
White 83.7%
Asian 3.6%
Hispanic or Latino 6.4%
African American 1.8%
Multi-Race, Not Hispanic or Latino 4.1%
American Indian or Alaska Native 0.4%
Native Hawaiian or Other Pacific Islander 0.0%

== History ==
From the time Medfield was founded in 1649 and established in 1651 as the 43rd town in the then Massachusetts Bay Colony, education was considered to be one of the most important aspects of the town. The founder of Medfield, Ralph Wheelock, became the first schoolmaster for the town. Medfield's first schoolhouse was built in 1666 on the south-east corner of North Street and Janes Avenue. It remained the town's only schoolhouse until 1732 when the town was divided into three school districts, north, south and center. Schoolhouses, in addition to the Center School on North Street at Janes Avenue, were then built in the north and south parts of town. The North School (later named the Hannah Adams School) was near the corner of South and High Streets and the North School (later named the Lowell Mason School) was on North Street, just past Dale Street. Then a later north school was built on the corner of North and Harding Street and then a final north schoolhouse was built on the corner of North and School Streets. The north and south schools held students generally in grades 1-6. In 1859 a new Center School was built on what is today 25 Pleasant Street. This building housed students in all grades living in the center part of town and was enlarged several times over the years. In 1879 it was named the Ralph Wheelock School and was in continuous operation until it was destroyed by fire in the early morning of March 21, 1940. Medfield High School was officially established in 1870 and was located in the Ralph Wheelock School. The first graduation took place in 1887. Medfield High School was actually abolished in 1903 when the School Committee recommended that the high school be closed all together, having legal permission to do so under the “High School Law of 1902.” In 1904, due in part to town pride, the town voted to re-establish part of the high school. The first two years would remain in the Ralph Wheelock School and the final two years students would continue at Dedham and Walpole High Schools. In 1906 a third year of high school was added and in 1907, using existing funds, the school committee added the full four-year highs school, where it has remained ever since. In 1908 the first high school graduation since June 1899 was held in Town Hall. In the 1920s a new high school (Hannah Adams Pfaff High School) was built on the corner of North and Dale Streets (today's park and recreation building) and the Wheelock School became the elementary school. After the Wheelock School burnt in 1940, a new school was built on the corner of Dale and Adams Street (Dale Street School) and this became the new high school with the Pfaff School on North and Dale becoming the elementary school. In 1951 a new elementary school was built on Adams Street (Memorial School). In 1957, the town accepted a gift of land on Pound Street from the Amos Clark Kingsbury family, a Medfield native, war hero and public school alum. This land was used to build a new junior/senior high school in 1961, which was named Amos Clark Kingsbury Jr.-Sr. High School. In 1966 a new JR. High school was built next door to the Pound Street school and was later named the Thomas A. Blake Middle School. In 1969 Medfield's newest school was built, yet another elementary school, on Elm Street (named the Ralph Wheelock School). This remained unchanged until 2005 when the middle school went under re-construction and was swapped with the high school. ref: This Old Town, Remembering Medfield by Richard DeSorgher

== Hall of Excellence ==
Each year, a Medfield High School alumnus is inducted into the Hall of Excellence and is given the opportunity to speak to graduating seniors at class day. The award is given to graduates who earned distinction in their profession and gave back to others in the community. Notable previous recipients include: Ambassador Donald E. Booth (Class of 1972), Michael Kelleher (Class of 1968).

== Academics ==
In 2019, 94% of the high school's students earned "proficient" or higher on the Science Massachusetts Comprehensive Assessment System (MCAS). 79% achieved scores that met or exceeded expectations on the new "Next Generation" English Language Arts MCAS, with 83% achieving such scores for math. Medfield High School consistently outperforms state averages on these exams.

Medfield High School Next Generation MCAS Scores (2019)
Test	Percent of Students Meeting or Exceeding Expectations	State Average
Grade 10 English Language Arts	79	61
Grade 10 Mathematics	83	59

Medfield High School Legacy MCAS Scores (2019)
Test	Percent of Students who Scored Proficient or Higher	State Average
Grade 10 Science and Tech/Eng	94	74

Medfield High School also prides itself on offering a wide range of honors and accelerated courses, which include 17 AP classes.

The Blue Ribbon Schools Program gives an award to about 300 schools across the country each year for demonstrating academic excellence or for making drastic improvements in academic success. Medfield earned this award in 2008.

== Athletics ==
Medfield High School sports teams have the nickname ″The Warriors″. They compete in the Tri-Valley League (TVL), which includes Westwood, Hopkinton, Ashland, Holliston, Millis, Dover-Sherborn, Norton, Medway, Norwood, Dedham, and Bellingham. Sports are very popular at Medfield; in 2018-2019, about 93% of students participated in one or more sports a year. Most programs contain Freshman, Junior Varsity, and Varsity teams. In 2004 a synthetic field and track was installed at the high school. In 2016 a new turf and track was installed. In 2008, a synthetic turf baseball field was installed thanks to funding from Curt Schilling (a resident of Medfield) and donations from the Boston Red Sox, next to the middle school. Medfield is known for having one of the most successful Boys and Girls Lacrosse and volleyball programs in all of New England. Medfield is a rival of Dover-Sherborn High School and plays them in football every Thanksgiving. In 2016 Medfield Hockey won the Division 2 state championship beating Lincoln-Sudbury.

== Medfield TV connection with Medfield High School ==
Medfield TV is a public access television station serving Medfield, Massachusetts. The station maintains a partnership with Medfield High School that allows students to gain hands-on experience in media production, broadcasting, and technical operations. Through this collaboration, students contribute to recording and producing school-related programming, including coverage of athletic events, community activities, and special features. The partnership provides practical learning opportunities outside the traditional classroom environment and supports student involvement in local media.

=== Warrior Sports Talk ===
Warrior Sports Talk was a student-hosted sports program produced in partnership with Medfield TV and Medfield High School. The show focused on coverage and discussion of Medfield High School athletics, including game recaps, team highlights, and interviews related to school sports. It was hosted by students Curran Coakley, Will Bergland, Ceci Camm, and Emily Morgan. The program ran for two seasons and provided participating students with experience in sports broadcasting, on-camera presentation, and production planning.

=== High School Gameday ===
High School Gameday is a student-hosted sports program produced in partnership with Medfield TV and Medfield High School. The show covers current athletic events within the Tri-Valley League (TVL), including analysis, previews, and recaps of local high school competitions. It is hosted by Medfield High School students Ethan Ambrose, Arthur Leacu, Mason Solomon, and Stamatis Polechronis. The program continues the station’s involvement in student-led sports media and offers participants experience in broadcasting, interviewing, and media production.

== Notable alumni ==
- Uzo Aduba, American actress
- Steve Berthiaume, former ESPN anchor
- Matthew Aucoin, American composer, conductor, writer, and pianist
- Blake Boston, Scumbag Steve
- Donald E. Booth, United States Special Envoy to Sudan and South Sudan
- Josh D'Amaro, CEO of The Walt Disney Company
- Jason Nash, American actor, writer, director, comedian, podcaster, and YouTube personality
