= Midland League (Massachusetts) =

High school sports conference

- Conference: Massachusetts Interscholastic Athletic Association
- Founded: 1905
- Folded: 1989

The Midland League was a high school sports conference in Massachusetts, part of the Massachusetts Interscholastic Athletic Association. During its existence, it consisted of schools from Middlesex, Norfolk, and Worcester Counties, along with one school from Rhode Island. The league was in existence from 1905 to 1989, when it would merge with the Wachuesett League and create the Midland Wachusett League.

== History ==
The Midland League was founded c. 1905 by schools Milford High School, Framingham High School, and Woonsocket High School. The lack of organizing bodies like the MIAA at the time allowed for schools to form leagues with out of state schools. Milford won the first league title in Football, defeating Framingham by a score of 17–11. In 1906, the league admitted Grafton High School and Northbridge High School (then known as Whitensville High School), only for them to leave by October presumably due to Milford's dominance. However they seemed to be back in league by the end of the month. By 1908, both schools had left for good; replacing them would be Natick High School and Needham High School.

The landscape changed again in 1911 at the Midland League reformed into the Midland Interscholastic League. With Needham and Woonsocket's departure, the league admitted rivals Hudson High School and Marlborough High School, along with nearby Westborough High School. At the end of the 1916 football season, Framingham elected to withdraw after a controversy in which the league voted to give Milford the league championship. This did not help the league the next year, when only Hudson, Milford, and Natick were able to field teams due to World War I.

With a new decade came a new league makeup; Needham was back by 1922, replacing Westborough, only for Westborough to rejoin the following year and replace recently departed Milford. Wellesley High School also joined in 1923, now able to play league games against their rivals in Needham. Natick had become too dominant by the end of 1925, and chose to leave to be an independent. To replace them was Milford, coming back to the league in 1926. Maynard High School joined in 1927, bringing the number of members up to seven. By the end of the 20's, the league started to take familiar shape with the departure of Needham and Wellsley, and the arrival of Hopkinton High School.

Clinton High School had been looking into joining the midland for some time, and by 1931, they finally got their chance. Hopkington and Westborough were out of the league by the mid '30s, bringing the total number of teams back down to five. In 1941, Natick made a surprising return to the Midland as a football only member, leaving the Bay State League. Leading up to the 1943 Baseball season, the League had to drop the schedule due to transport difficulties; thankfully they were able to fix these problems by the fall in time for Football season. Franklin High School was next up to join the Midland in 1948 as a Basketball only member, although it is unclear why they made this move.

Like 25 years prior, Natick had become too great a football opponent and after Milford and Maynard refused to play them in 1950, they left the league. Replacing them would be Shrewsbury, but it never ended up coming to fruition. History was made in May 1958 when Milford hosted Hudson in the first night baseball game in Midland League history.

The 1960s spelled trouble for the league. Maynard, unhappy with playing night games during the 1964 football season, and mixed with other smaller issues, caused schedules to fall apart and the league to collapse. This in turn uprooted many longstanding rivalries, like that of Maynard-Clinton. Clinton would go on to find new rivals in Nashoba, a much closer opponent than Maynard. This breakup did not last long, and by the end of 1966, the schools had come together to bring the league back for the following season. The schools had been and would continue to be a part of an older Central Mass Conference, and would be finally be adding conference mate Shrewsbury. Only football would be played fully in the Midland, while other sports would straddle both leagues. By the end of the decade, Algonquin Regional High School joined the league having been established only ten years prior. Schools would also completely leave the old Central Mass Conference by this point, all now full members of the Midland.

Maynard made the jump to the Dual County League for the 1973 season, once again ending its rivalry match with Clinton that had been reinstated less than ten years prior. By 1974, however, they would be back in the Midland. Westborough, having spent time in different leagues since their departure in the 30's, left the Southern Worcester County League to rejoin the Midland in 1975. The league would stay with these eight members for the next 13 years. In 1988, for the last year of the league, Fitchburg High School, Leominster High School, and Wachusett Regional High School all left the Central Massachusetts Conference for the Midland.

In 1989, the Midland League merged with the Wachusett League to form the Midland Wachusett League.

== Member Schools ==
School	Location	Mascot	Colors	Years in League†	Current Conference
Algonquin Regional High School	Northborough, Massachusetts	Titans	Maroon & Gold	~1970-1989	Midland Wachusett League
Clinton High School	Clinton, Massachusetts	Gaels	Green & Gold	1931-1989	Midland Wachusett League
Fitchburg High School	Fitchburg, Massachusetts	Red Raiders	Red & Gray	1988-1989	Midland Wachusett League
Framingham High School	Framingham, Massachusetts	Flyers	Navy Blue & White	1905-1916	Bay State Conference
Franklin High School	Franklin, Massachusetts	Panthers	Navy Blue, Sky Blue, & White	1948-~1960 (basketball only)	Hockomock League
Grafton High School	Grafton, Massachusetts	Gators	Green & White	1906-1908	Midland Wachusett League
Hopkinton High School	Hopkinton, Massachusetts	Hillers	Green, Orange, & White	~1930-~1935	Tri-Valley League
Hudson High School	Hudson, Massachusetts	Hawks	Red & White	1911-1989	Midland Wachusett League
Leominster High School	Leominster, Massachusetts	Blue Devils	Blue & White	1988-1989	Midland Wachusett League
Marlborough High School	Marlborough, Massachusetts	Panthers	Orange & Black	1911-1989	Midland Wachusett League
Maynard High School	Maynard, Massachusetts	Tigers	Orange & Black	1927-1973, 1974–1989	Midland Wachusett League
Milford High School	Milford, Massachusetts	Scarlet Hawks	Red & White	1905-1922, 1926–1989	Hockomock League
Natick High School	Natick, Massachusetts	Redhawks	Red, Blue, & White	1908-1925, (football only 1941-1950)	Bay State Conference
Needham High School	Needham, Massachusetts	Rockets	Navy Blue & Gold	1908-1911, 1922-~1930	Bay State Conference
Northbridge High School	Northbridge, Massachusetts	Rams	Maroon & White	1906-1908	Central Massachusetts Athletic Conference
Shrewsbury High School	Shrewsbury, Massachusetts	Colonials	Navy Blue & Vegas Gold	1966-1989	Midland Wachusett League
Wachusett Regional High School	Holden, Massachusetts	Mountaineers	Green & White	1988-1989	Midland Wachusett League
Wellesley High School	Wellesley, Massachusetts	Raiders	Red & Black	1923-~1930	Bay State Conference
Westborough High School	Westborough, Massachusetts	Rangers	Cardinal & Navy Blue	1911-1922, 1923-~1935, 1975–1989	Midland Wachusett League
Woonsocket High School	Woonsocket, Rhode Island	Villa Novans	Maroon & White	1905-1911	Rhode Island Interscholastic League

† Not including the 1964-1966 league breakup

== Football League Champions ==
Below is the list of the league champions from each year

Year	School
1905	Milford
1906	-
1907	-
1908	-
1909	-
1910	-
1911	Natick
1912	Marlborough
1913	Marlborough
1914	Marlborough
1915	Natick
1916	Framingham
1916	Natick
1916	Milford
1917	N/A (WWI)
1918	N/A (WWI)
1919	-
1920	-
1921	Needham
1922	Milford
1923	Natick
1924	Natick
1925	N/A
1926	Hudson
1927	Hudson
1928	Marlborough
1929	Milford
1930	Milford
1931	Maynard
1932	Maynard
1933	-
1934	Hudson
1935	Milford
1936	Hudson
1937	Clinton
1938	Maynard
1939	Clinton
1940	Clinton
1941	Hudson
1942	Natick
1943	Natick
1943	Milford
1944	Marlborough
1945	Clinton
1946	Clinton
1947	Natick
1948	Clinton
1949	Marlborough
1950	Clinton
1951	Marlborough
1952	Hudson
1953	Clinton
1954	Marlborough
1955	Marlborough
1956	Marlborough
1957	Marlborough
1958	Marlborough
1959	Marlborough
1960	Marlborough
1961	Marlborough
1962	Hudson
1963	Marlborough
1964	N/A (League Broken Up)
1965	N/A (League Broken Up)
1966	N/A (League Broken Up)
1967	Marlborough
1968	-
1969	Maynard
1970	Maynard
1971	Shrewsbury
1972	Shrewsbury
1973	Algonquin
1974	Hudson
1974	Milford
1975	Milford
1976	-
1977	Clinton
1978	Milford
1979	Milford
1980	Marlborough
1981	Marlborough
1982	Hudson
1983	Milford
1984	-
1985	-
1986	-
1987	-
1988	-

== State Champions ==
This is a list of MIAA State championships won by schools while a part of the Midland league

=== Football ===
Note: From 1972 to 2012, football state championships were separated by region, so there would be multiple champions from each division. From 1972 to 1977 and from 1997 to 2008, it was split between Eastern Mass and Central/Western Mass and there would be two champions in each division. From 1978 to 1996 and from 2009 to 2012 Central and Western Mass split so there would be three champions in each division. In 2013 everything was combined and therefore only allowed one state champion per division.

- Algonquin - 1973 D2 Central/Western
- Milford - 1975 D2 Central/Western; 1983 D1 Central
- Marlborough - 1979 D1 Central
- Westborough - 1984, 1986, 1987 D1 Central

=== Ice Hockey ===
==== Boys ====
- Hudson - 1978 D1

=== Wrestling ===
==== Boys ====
- Milford - 1978, 1981, 1983 D2

=== Baseball ===
- Westborough - 1980 D2

=== Tennis ===
==== Boys ====
- Hudson - 1980 D2

=== Outdoor Track ===
==== Girls ====
- Shrewsbury - 1983, 1989
