= Algonquin Regional High School =

Coordinates: 42°19′33″N 71°36′48″W

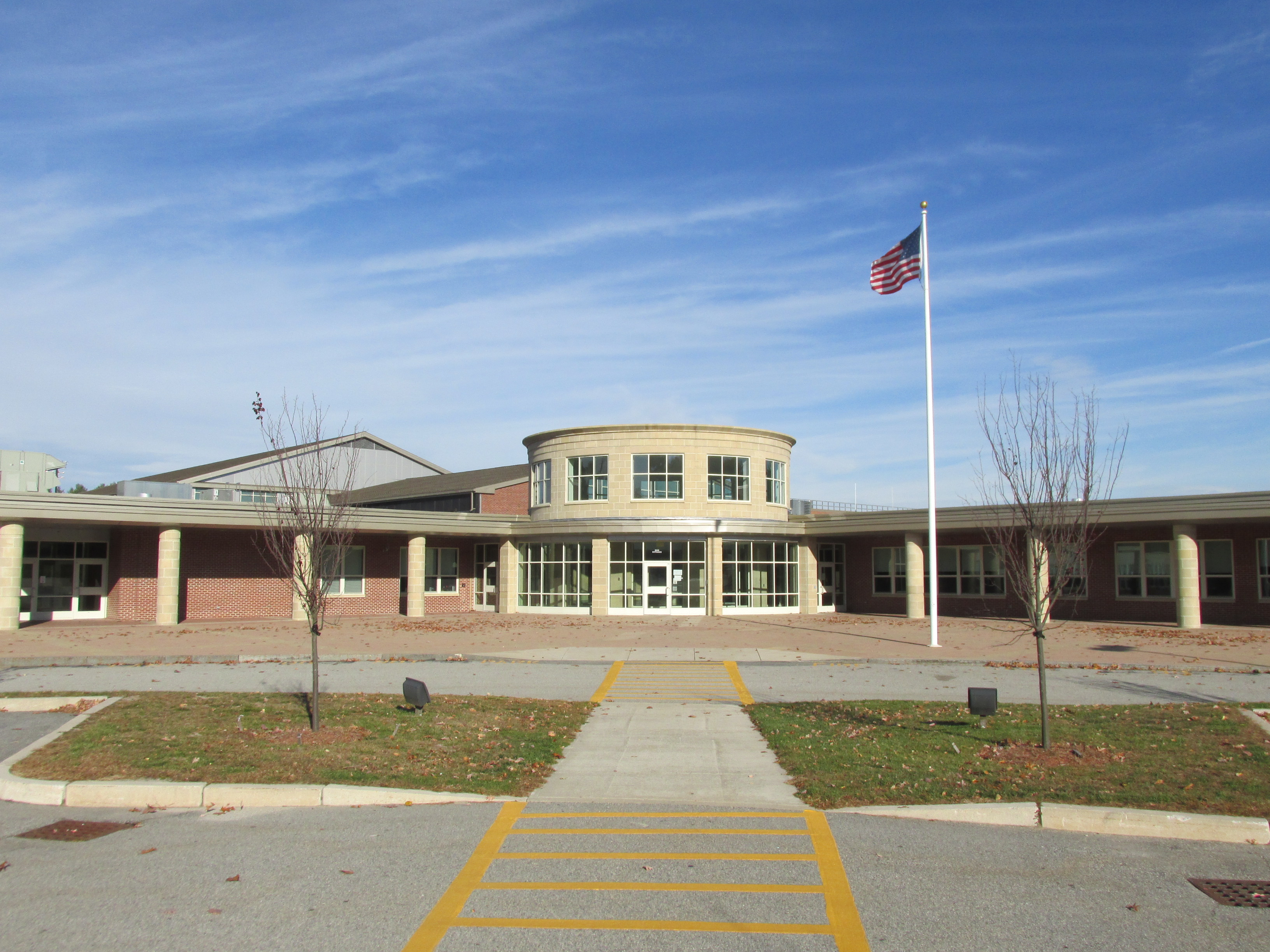
- 79 Bartlett Street; Northborough, Massachusetts 01532; United States

Information
- Type: Public Secondary
- Established: 1959
- School district: Northborough-Southborough Regional School District
- Principal: Sean Bevan
- Faculty: 115
- Teaching staff: 110.55 (on an FTE basis)
- Grades: 9–12
- Enrollment: 1,197 (2024–25)
- Student to teacher ratio: 10.83
- Campus: Suburban
- Colors: Maroon and Gold
- Athletics: MIAA Division I
- Athletics conference: Midland Wachusett League
- Mascot: NA (As of now ARHS only has a team name "The Titans" but no mascot has been created for this new name)
- Rival: Westborough High School
- Newspaper: The Harbinger
- Budget: $23,199,404 total $15,859 per pupil (2016)
- Communities served: Northborough, Southborough
- Website: www.arhs.nsboro.k12.ma.us

Algonquin Regional High School is a public high school located in Northborough, Massachusetts, United States. The school serves the students of the Northborough-Southborough Regional School District (NSRSD) comprising both Northborough and neighboring Southborough.

The school's mascot as of February 11, 2022, is currently undecided, though the schools teams have a new name "The Titans". The former mascot was the Tomahawk, known by many as the "T-Hawk." On April 28, 2021, the Northborough-Southborough Regional School Committee voted, 9–0, to retire the Tomahawk as its mascot. A study group was assembled to determine a new mascot, which was voted on by the student body at that time. The school's colors are maroon and gold. Algonquin Regional's Superintendent is Greg Martineau and its Principal is Sean Bevan.

== History ==
=== Renovation ===
In 2003, a $3 million renovation and expansion plan was approved by the district and renovations began that year. Due to failures associated with the general contractor, Eastern Contractors Inc., and need for dismissal of the contractor from the project, delays in completion of the renovation project occurred. In 2005, the regional district fired the contractor from the project. The renovations and expansion efforts were completed as a result of efforts by school district representatives in 2008, with the grand opening taking place on September 4 of that year. In 2023, the high school went through a major renovation of its athletic facilities, referred to as the "Gonkplex" project. The initiative included the installment of two synthetic turf fields. replacing the stadium varsity field and added a new multipurpose field. In addition to the fields, other upgrades include a new running track, ADA-compliant grandstands, and an elevator for the press box. The project will also update the tennis courts, adding pickleball lines, and improve the surrounding grounds. The price for the project was approximately $7.5 million.

== Academics ==
Algonquin Regional offers its students a multitude of courses within various disciplines such as Mathematics, Science, Applied Arts & Technology, Fine & Performing Arts, Health & Fitness, Foreign Languages (including Spanish, French, and Latin), and Instructional Support. College Preparatory courses are graded on a 4.0 scale, Honors courses are graded on a 4.5 scale, and Advanced Placement courses are graded on a 5.0 scale.

The following Advanced Placement Courses are offered: AP Microeconomics, AP English Literature and Composition, AP English Language and Composition, AP Studio Art, AP Music Theory, AP Calculus AB, AP Calculus BC, AP Statistics, AP Biology, AP Chemistry, AP Environmental Science, AP Human Geography, AP Psychology, AP United States Government and Politics, AP United States History, AP World History, AP Latin, AP Spanish, AP French, AP Computer Science Principles, AP Computer Science A, AP Physics C, AP Precalculus

== Athletics ==
The Titans (then Tomahawks) saw considerable athletic success during the early 2000's, winning seven state titles between 2004 and 2012. The Boys' Soccer team won back-to-back titles in 2004 and 2005, and Boys' Baseball followed up with another title for the third straight year in 2006. The Girls' Tennis and Soccer teams both earned state titles in 2009, and the Girls' Gymnastics added two more titles, again back-to-back in 2011 and 2012.

Algonquin maintains a strong cross-town rivalry with Westborough High School, in which both teams compete in an annual Thanksgiving Day Football Game.

=== Soccer ===
The Algonquin Boys' Varsity Soccer team captured two straight MIAA Division I State titles in 2004 and 2005, the first state titles for the entire school. In 2006, they returned to the state final to play St. John's Preparatory School, but lost 4–1.

The Algonquin girls' soccer team's upset of nationally-ranked Acton-Boxborough Regional High School in the 2009 Massachusetts State Final made local headlines and was even recognized by ESPN. The girls have come close to another state title three times, first in 2015 when the team played in the title game but lost to Needham 3–1, in 2019 when they lost in the semifinal to Westfield 1–0 in overtime, and in 2022, losing the State Final 1-0 to Hingham.

=== Tennis ===
In 2009 the Girls' Varsity Tennis team had an undefeated season and eventually won the state title. That same year, the Boys' tennis team won the Central Massachusetts Division Title but lost to Longmeadow in the state semi-final. In 2010, the Girls' team received a #1 seeding in the state tournament.

=== Gymnastics ===
Girls' Varsity Gymnastics became State Champions in 2011 after an undefeated season, being named both League and Sectional Champions, then repeated the same feat in 2012.

=== Lacrosse ===
The Boys' lacrosse program won the Central Massachusetts District in 2007 and then again in back-to-back years in 2011 and 2012, however they just fell short of the State Title both times, losing to Eastern Mass champions Medfield High School and Concord-Carlisle High School, respectively. The Girls' program recently became Central Massachusetts Champions and became the first team in Massachusetts girls lacrosse history to represent Central Massachusetts in the State Final Game; they lost to Eastern Mass powerhouse Westwood High School.

=== Rugby ===
The Girls' Rugby team won the MYRO State championship every year from 2011 to 2015.

=== Ice Hockey ===
After upsetting the heavily favored Shrewsbury Colonials 3–2 in a shootout, the boys' ice hockey team won the 2015–2016 Division III Central Massachusetts championship, beating Groton-Dunstable 2–1 in a shootout. They then beat Westfield 6–2 in the state semi-final before falling to Hanover 5–1 at the TD Garden in the State Championship game.

The Girls' Hockey team won the 2022 Division II State Championship after a 2-1 OT win over Canton. It was the team's third-straight overtime victory, defeating Medfield and Winchester in the state semi-final and quarter-final respectively. It was the first state championship in hockey in Algonquin's history.

=== Volleyball ===
The 2017 Boys Volleyball team completed an undefeated season, but failed to secure any tournament title.

Algonquin Regional High School MIAA State Championships
Sport	Years Won
Boys' Baseball	2006
Girls' Gymnastics	2011, 2012
Boys' Soccer	2004, 2005
Girls' Soccer	2009
Girls' Tennis	2009
Girls' Hockey	2022

== The Harbinger ==
The Harbinger is the official student newspaper of Algonquin Regional. It covers campus-wide events and athletic results in addition to controversial topics within the school. The publication regularly receives honors at the New England Scholastic Press Association conference. The Harbinger won a Gold Crown Award at the Columbia Scholastic Press Association in March 2018 and March 2024, a Silver Crown Award in March 2025 and March 2026, and a National Scholastic Press Association Pacemaker award in April 2018 and April 2022.

== Sachem ==
Sachem is the literary and art magazine of Algonquin. It is published once a year and is entirely student-run. All poems, stories, artwork, and photography are contributed voluntarily by students. In the 2010-2011 school year it won the Gold Circle Award from Columbia Scholastic Press Association, a prestigious award for literary magazines.

== Notable alumni ==
- Mark "The Bird" Fidrych — former MLB pitcher; 1976 American League Rookie of the Year
- Ryan Gallant — professional skateboarder
- Rachel Lee Goldenberg - film director and screenwriter
- Alex Karaban - NBA player for the Sacramento Kings, member of back-to-back NCAA Division I national championships in 2022-23 and in 2023-24 UConn Huskies men’s basketball team.
- Dorian McMenemy— Olympic swimmer for the Dominican Republic
- Jon Radoff — internet entrepreneur and author
- Nathaniel Raymond — human rights investigator and anti-torture advocate
- Mike Sherman — former head coach of the Green Bay Packers
- Shion Takeuchi — creator of Inside Job on Netflix and writer on Gravity Falls
- Korey Dropkin — silver Olympic medalist in curling
