= Norton High School =

Norton High School may refer to:

== High schools ==
- Norton High School (Massachusetts), a public high school in Norton, Massachusetts
- Norton High School (Ohio), a public high school in Norton, Ohio
- Norton Community High School, a public high school in Norton, Kansas
