= Medfield Public Schools =

Public school district in Massachusetts

Medfield School District

Location
- Medfield, Massachusetts United States

District information
- Type: Public School District
- Grades: PK-12
- Superintendent: Jeffrey J Marsden
- Schools: 5
- Budget: $33,658,211▲
- NCES District ID: 2507530

Students and staff
- Athletic conference: Tri Valley League (TVL)
- District mascot: Warrior
- Colors: Blue and White

Other information
- Website: www.medfield.net

The Medfield Public Schools is the public school district for Medfield, Massachusetts, part of Norfolk County. The district has a total of five schools: three elementary schools, one middle school, and one high school.

== Schools ==
The district has a total of five schools: three elementary schools, one middle school, and one high school.

Schools in the Medfield School District (2012)
School	Grades	Students
Memorial School	PK-1	402
Ralph Wheelock School	2–3	400
Dale Street School	4–5	439
Thomas A. Blake Middle School	6–8	721
Medfield High School	9–12	898
District total	PK-12	2860

== Academics ==
The Medfield School District continually ranks among the top ten school systems in the Massachusetts Comprehensive Assessment System (MCAS).

Medfield MCAS Scores (2012)
Test	Percent of Students who scored Proficient or Higher	State Average
Grade 3 Reading	78	61
Grade 3 Mathematics	68	61
Grade 4 English Language Arts	75	57
Grade 4 Mathematics	60	51
Grade 5 English Language Arts	75	61
Grade 5 Mathematics	75	57
Grade 5 Science and Tech/Eng	68	52
Grade 6 English Language Arts	92	66
Grade 6 Mathematics	85	60
Grade 7 English Language Arts	92	71
Grade 7 Mathematics	70	51
Grade 8 English Language Arts	95	81
Grade 8 Mathematics	72	52
Grade 8 Science and Tech/Eng	68	43
Grade 10 English Language Arts	98	88
Grade 10 Mathematics	96	78
Grade 10 Science and Tech/Eng	96	69
