= WIQH =

- Concord, Massachusetts; United States
- Frequency: 88.3 MHz

Programming
- Format: High school radio

Ownership
- Owner: Concord-Carlisle High School; (Concord-Carlisle Regional School District)

History
- First air date: December 1971

Technical information
- Licensing authority: FCC
- Facility ID: 13556
- Class: A
- ERP: 100 watts
- HAAT: 28 meters (92 ft)
- Transmitter coordinates: 42°26′49.7″N 71°20′51.7″W

Links
- Public license information: Public file; LMS
- Website: www.wiqh.org

WIQH (88.3 FM) is a high school radio station to serve Concord, Massachusetts. The station is owned by Concord-Carlisle High School and licensed to the Concord-Carlisle Regional School District. It airs a high school radio format featuring a wide variety of music genres.

The station was assigned the WIQH call letters by the Federal Communications Commission (FCC). Contrary to popular belief, the call letters do not stand for Why I Quit High School.

WIQH broadcasts student shows 5 days a week (except for weekends). DJs play a wide variety of music, host talk shows, and also frequently cover Concord-Carlisle's Varsity sports games.

WIQH's broadcasting hours are 24 hours a day, 365 days a year, with live student run shows from 3 to 7 p.m. on school days during the school year.

== History ==
In 1971, WIQH was founded in essentially a glorified closet at Concord-Carlisle High School. It was a 10-watt station, giving it a range of just a few miles on the crowded radio dial of the Boston area. In 1975, when the school completed a large expansion, WIQH moved across campus to a leftover mobile classroom trailer. This would be the station's home for the next 20 years.

In the 1980s, WIQH expanded their broadcasting hours to 10 p.m. weeknights. In 1985 when the FCC revised its rules governing small, non-commercial radio stations, WIQH upgraded to a 100 watt transmitter which doubled its broadcasting range.

In the late 1990s, the school struggled to find a faculty advisor for the station and things took a turn for the worse. Sporadic broadcast hours, waning student involvement and aging equipment took its toll. The station briefly shut down but was quickly revived in 1999 with support from students, local parents and community members.

In the early 2000s, WIQH moved once again, this time to the l-1 room at CCHS. In 2002, the station celebrated its 5th Annual CCHS Battle of the Bands. Later that year, WIQH broadcast its first automated programming using “Simian” automation software paid for by a grant from the Concord Education Fund. In September 2009, WIQH began streaming all of its programming live online at WIQH.org.

In 2015, Concord Carlisle HS was rebuilt, and WIQH relocated yet again; however, this time space for the station was marked in the building's design plans. The WIQH signal reaches around the world, via streaming audio and the internet.

In November, 2023 WIQH started broadcasting 24/7; a change from the previous hours of 10 AM to 11 PM.
