= Medway High School (Massachusetts) =

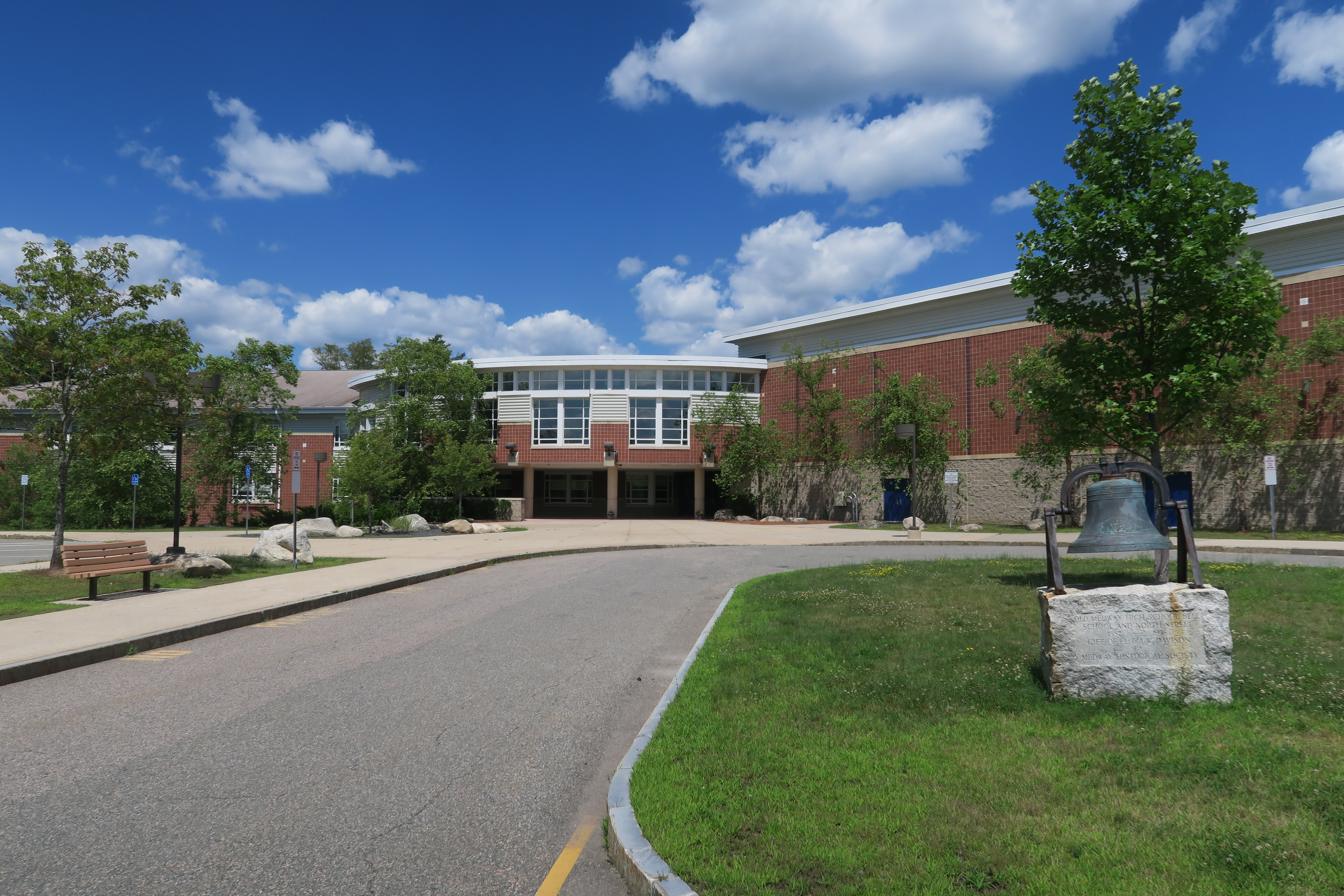

Location
- 88 Summer Street; Medway, Massachusetts 02053; United States
- 42°09′20.16″N 71°26′28.32″W

Information
- Type: Public high school Open enrollment
- Established: 2003 (New High School)
- Principal: TBD
- Staff: 46.67 (on an FTE basis)
- Enrollment: 607 (2023-2024)
- Student to teacher ratio: 13.01
- Schedule: 8am - 2:30pm
- Campus type: Country
- Colors: Navy Blue and White
- Athletics conference: Tri-Valley League
- Mascot: Mustang
- Nickname: Mustangs
- Website: mhs.medwayschools.org/o/mhs

Medway High School is a four-year public high school in Medway, Massachusetts, United States.

== High school ==
The High School is the newest of the four schools in Medway. The building was completed in 2003 and the school saw its first graduating class in 2005.

In the 2023-2024 school year, the graduating class had 148 students, with 607 students enrolled in total.

== Sports ==
The Medway Mustangs have a strong athletic program in general and have won a considerable amount (18) of State Championships in the past 30 years. Medway has been a prominent soccer town for the past three decades. The Mustangs particularly dominated from the late 1980s to the late 1990s. Medway made it to the South State Finals 8 out of nine years from 1987 to 1995 and back again for another State Title in 1998 to go along with the 2 they already brought home in 1990 and 1993.

The most recent state championships have been Boys Soccer (2000), Girls Soccer (2001), and Girls Volleyball (2001 & 1999).

Medway is a member of the Tri-Valley League (TVL), traditionally a competitive league made up of mainly Division II and III schools. In 2012, the boys Ice Hockey team appeared in the State Finals at TD Garden. In 2008 the Mustangs won a Co-Share of the TVL for Football, which they shared with Norton High School.

Some other recent TVL tiles since 1995 include:

- Ice Hockey TVL titles in 2007, 2006, 2017, 2019, & 2020
- Girls Soccer TVL titles in 2006 & 2001.
- Boys Soccer TVL titles in 2012, 2005, 2002, 2000, 1998 & 1995.
- Boys Baseball TVL titles in 2002 and 2016.
- Boys Basketball TVL title in 2017.
- Girls Volleyball TVL titles in 2001, 2000 & 1999.

The 2001 Girls Volleyball team finished their season undefeated at 25–0. They won an unbelievable 55 of 56 total sets played during that streak. They had also appeared in the state finals in 2000 and had won the state finals in 1999.

The Boys Baseball team enjoyed a historic season of their own in 2002, finishing 22-2 and easily capturing the TVL title with a regular season record of 19–1. Seven of the nine players in the starting line-up were seniors.

Recently, Medway High School graduate Zack DiGregorio went to the 2022 Winter Olympics to participate as a part of the U.S. Luge Team.

== Theatre ==
The Medway High School musical is produced on a yearly basis. Each year's show is typically cast in mid-to-late December, with rehearsals running from early January through mid March. Most performances last about two and a half hours, which includes one intermission.

== Notable alumni ==
- Zack DiGregorio, 2022 Winter Olympics U.S. Luge Team
