= Midland Wachusett League =

American high school athletic conference

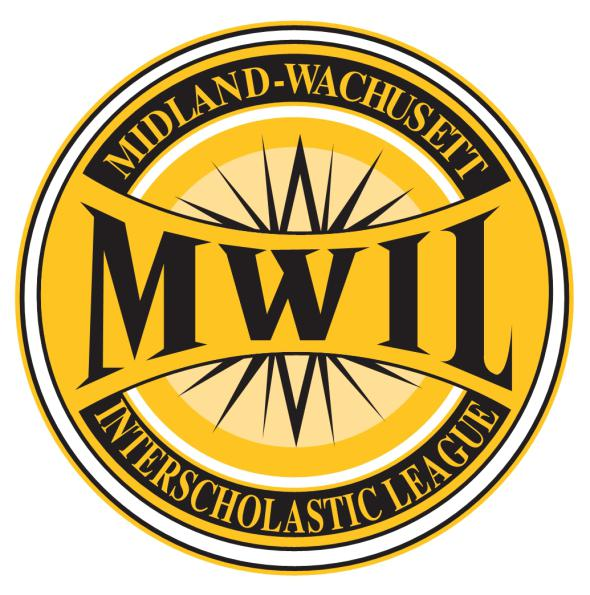
- Conference: Massachusetts Interscholastic Athletic Association
- Founded: 1989
- No. of teams: 27

The Midland Wachusett League (Mid-Wach) is a high school athletic conference located in District 3 of the Massachusetts Interscholastic Athletic Association. The Mid-Wach was formed in 1989 as a merger between the Midland and Wachusett leagues. The league consists of twenty-seven public high schools in the Worcester County and Middlesex County of Massachusetts.

The league is separated into four divisions (A, B, C, and D) by size of school. Shrewsbury High School is currently the largest with 1,879 students, while Murdock High School is the smallest with 252 students.

The Mid-Wach sponsors eighteen different sports across all divisions in the MIAA, and is the main league in central Massachusetts.

== History ==
Midland-Wachusett League
Locations of the schools within the Mid-Wach league. Division A schools in gold, B in red, C in black, and D in blue.

The Midland and Wachusett leagues were two of the oldest leagues in the state, but as both had been growing over the same area over the better half of the century, they decided to merge in 1989. Three years later in 1992, Westford Academy who had been in the Wachusett League for many years left for the Dual County League for more recognition and a chance to fit in better with the other schools. In 1995 Murdock High School joined bringing the number of schools in the Mid-Wach back to twenty-two members. A year later, The Mid-Wach admitted Bromfield, Tahanto, and West Boylston all from the Dual Valley League, which brought the total membership up to an even twenty-five. It wasn't until 2011 where the league changed again, this time admitting Tyngsborough from the Dual County, who was outclassed in most sports in the DCL. A year later, longtime member Milford elected to leave for the Hockomock League, citing travel expenses as one of the main reasons for the move. In 2013, Shepherd Hill joined looking for better competition than what they had in the Southern Worcester County League. After also outgrowing the SWCL, Grafton High School joined the Mid-Wach in 2025 as part of the A division.

== Member Schools ==
School	Location	Mascot	Colors	Joined League	Year Founded	Enrollment
Division A
Algonquin Regional High School	Northborough, Massachusetts	Titans*	Maroon & Gold	1989	1959	1,194
Grafton High School	Grafton, Massachusetts	Gators	Green & White	2025	1838	891
Leominster High School	Leominster, Massachusetts	Blue Devil	Blue & White	1989	1963	1,073
Shrewsbury High School	Shrewsbury, Massachusetts	Colonials	Navy Blue & Vegas Gold	1989	1957	1,879
Wachusett Regional High School	Holden, Massachusetts	Mountaineer	Green & White	1989	1955	1,861
Westborough High School	Westborough, Massachusetts	The Rangers	Cardinal & Navy Blue	1989	1968	1,202
Division B
Fitchburg High School	Fitchburg, Massachusetts	Red Raiders	Red & Gray	1989	1849	1,180
Groton-Dunstable Regional High School	Groton, Massachusetts	Crusader	Maroon, White & Black	1989	1967	689
Hudson High School	Hudson, Massachusetts	Hawk	Red & White	1989	1867	809
Marlborough High School	Marlborough, Massachusetts	Panthers	Orange & Black	1989	1851	1,013
Nashoba Regional High School	Bolton, Massachusetts	Wolves	Green & Gold	1989	1961	841
North Middlesex Regional High School	Townsend, Massachusetts	Patriots	Red, White, & Blue	1989	1959	757
Oakmont Regional High School	Ashburnham, Massachusetts	Spartans	Green & White	1989	1960	634
Shepherd Hill Regional High School	Dudley, Massachusetts	Fighting Ram	Maroon & Gold	2013	1973	937
Division C
Ayer Shirley Regional High School	Ayer, Massachusetts	Panther	Maroon & White	1989	1964	412
Clinton High School	Clinton, Massachusetts	Gael	Green & Gold	1989		581
Gardner High School	Gardner, Massachusetts	Wildcats	Orange & Black	1989	1872	809
Littleton High School	Littleton, Massachusetts	Tigers	Blue & Gold	1989	1922	487
Lunenburg High School	Lunenburg, Massachusetts	Blue Knight	Blue & White	1989	1895	449
Quabbin Regional High School	Barre, Massachusetts	Panther	Blue & Gold	1989	1966	567
Tyngsborough High School	Tyngsborough, Massachusetts	Tigers	Red, Black, & White	2011	1892	420
Division D
Bromfield School	Harvard, Massachusetts	Trojan	Blue & White	1996	1878	325
Maynard High School	Maynard, Massachusetts	Tigers	Orange & Black	1989	1871	297
Murdock High School	Winchendon, Massachusetts	Blue Devils	Blue & White	1995	1887	252
Narragansett Regional High School	Templeton, Massachusetts	'Gansett Warriors	Royal Blue, White & Silver	1989	1955	475
Tahanto Regional High School	Boylston, Massachusetts	Stag	Green & White	1996	1962	554
West Boylston Middle/High School	West Boylston, Massachusetts	Lions	Blue & White	1996	1957	448

*Unofficial Mascot

== Former Members ==
School	Location	Mascot	Colors	Joined	Left	Current league
Milford High School	Milford, Massachusetts	Scarlet Hawks	Red & White	1989	2012	Hockomock League
Westford Academy	Westford, Massachusetts	Ghosts	Maroon & Gray	1989	1992	Dual County League

== State Championships ==
This is a list of MIAA State championships won by schools while a part of the Mid-Wach league

=== Football ===
Note: From 1972 to 2012, football state championships were separated by region, so there would be multiple champions from each division. From 1972 to 1977 and from 1997 to 2008, it was split between Eastern Mass and Central/Western Mass and there would be two champions in each division. From 1978 to 1996 and from 2009 to 2012 Central and Western Mass split so there would be three champions in each division. In 2013 everything was combined and therefore only allowed one state champion per division.

1989; Leominster - D1 Central; North Middlesex - D2 Central; 1990; Leominster - D1 Central; North Middlesex - D2 Central; Narragansett - D3 Central; 1991; Hudson - D2 Central; 1992; North Middlesex D1 Central; 1993; North Middlesex - D1 Central; 1994; North Middlesex - D1 Central; Clinton - D3 Central; 1995; North Middlesex - D1 Central; Clinton - D3 Central; 1996; Fitchburg - D1 Central; Narragansett - D3 Central	1997; Leominster - D1A Central/Western; Gardner - D2A Central/Western; 1998; Leominster - D1A Central/Western; Lunenburg - D3A Central/Western; 1999; Nashoba - D1 Central/Western; Clinton - D3 Central/Western; 2000; Fitchburg - D1 Central/Western; Shrewsbury - D1A Central/Western; Clinton - D3 Central/Western; 2001; Clinton - D3 Central/Western; 2002; Leominster - D1 Central/Western; Clinton - D3 Central/Western; 2003; Wachusett - D1A Central/Western; 2004; Wachusett - D1A Central/Western; 2005; Narragansett - D3 Central/Western; 2006; Milford - D1A Central/Western; Oakmont - D3 Central/Western; 2007; Shrewsbury - D1A Central/Western	2009; Wachusett - D1 Central; Oakmont - D3 Central; 2010; Wachusett - D1A Central; Clinton - D3A Central; 2011; Leominster - D1 Central; Nashoba - D2 Central; 2012; Leominster - D1 Central; Nashoba - D2 Central; West Boylston - D5 Central; 2013; Littleton - D6; 2015; Nashoba - D2; 2018; Nashoba - D4; 2022; West Boylston - D7; 2023; West Boylston - D8; 2024; Hudson - D6; West Boylston - D8

=== Cross Country ===
==== Girls ====
- Fitchburg - 1989 D1
- Nashoba - 1992 D1
- Bromfield - 2002, 2005, 2006, 2007 D2; 2023 D3
- Littleton - 2018 D2

=== Field Hockey ===
- Quabbin - 1991 D2

=== Volleyball ===
- Marlborough - 2003, 2011 D2
- Westborough - 2007,2017, 2022, 2023, 2024 D2
- Groton-Dunstable - 2018 D2

=== Soccer ===
==== Boys ====
- Nashoba - 1990 D2
- Littleton -D3- 2001,2002,2003,2004
- Bromfield - 1996, 2005, 2007, 2008 D3; 2017, 2018, 2019, 2025 D4; 2021, 2022 D5
- Groton-Dunstable - 2001, 2011, 2012 D2; 1999 D3
- Westborough - 2003 D2
- Algonquin - 2004 (co-champs with Boston College High School), 2005 D1

==== Girls ====
- Marlborough - 1985, 1988, 1991 D1
- Wachusett - 2001, 2002, 2017, 2018 D1
- Nashoba - 2004 D1
- West Boylston 2006 D3
- Algonquin - 2009 D1

=== Fall Golf ===
- West Boylston - 2001 D3
- Shrewsbury - 2009 D1
- Ayer-Shirley - 2024 D3

=== Basketball ===
==== Boys ====
- Maynard - 2017 D4; 2022 D5

==== Girls ====
- Maynard - 2020 D4 (Co-champs with Cathedral High School)
- Wachusett - 2025, 2026 D1

=== Winter Swim & Dive ===
==== Girls ====
- Gardner - 1994–2008, 2010 D1

=== Gymnastics ===
Algonquin - 1994, 2011, 2012

=== Ice Hockey ===
==== Boys ====
- Gardner - 1994 D3
- North Middlesex - 1995, 1998, 2014 D3
- Shrewsbury - 1999, 2014, 2017, 2018 D3
- Marlborough - 2005 D3
- Oakmont - 2010 - D3A
- Hudson - 2012 D3
- Groton-Dunstable - 2012 D3A
- Nashoba - 2015, 2016 D3A; 2023 D3
- Lunenburg - 2018 D3A (Co-champs with Ayer Shirley)
- Ayer-Shirley - 2018 D3A (Co-champs with Lunenburg)
- Wachusett - 2019 D3
- Littleton - 2026 D4

==== Girls ====
- Algonquin - 2022 D2
- Shrewsbury - 2023 D1

=== Alpine Ski ===
==== Girls ====
- Shrewsbury - 2005, 2006 D2
- Bromfield - 2008
- Lunenburg - 2013 (Co-Champs with Wellesley High School)

=== Indoor Track & Field ===
==== Boys ====
- Wachusett - 1994, 1995 D1
- Hudson - 2008 D4
- Nashoba - 2008, 2009, 2022 D3
- Ayer-Shirley - 2018 D4
- Littleton - 2022, 2023, 2024 D4
- Algonquin - 2025 D2

==== Girls ====
- Shrewsbury - 1991, 1992 D2
- Wachusett - 1997, 1999, 2000, 2002 D1
- Bromfield - 2001, 2006-2010 D4
- Littleton - 2017, 2018 D5
- Lunenburg - 2026 D5

=== Wrestling ===
==== Boys ====
- Milford - 1996 D2
- Quabbin - 2004 D3
- Nashoba - 2015 D2

=== Baseball ===
- Milford - 1990 D1
- Westborough - 1991 D2
- Narragansett - 1991 D3
- Clinton - 1993 D2
- Leominster - 1996 D1
- Hudson - 1999, 2002 D2
- Groton-Dunstable - 2016 D3
- Oakmont - 2023 D3

=== Softball ===
- Oakmont - 1989 D2
- Shrewbury - 2006 D1
- Hudson - 2007, 2010, 2019 - D2
- Wachusett - 2019 D1
- Maynard - 2026 D5

=== Outdoor Track & Field ===
==== Boys ====
- Littleton - 2001, 2002, 2003, 2004, 2022 D6
- Westborough - 2023 D3
- Ayer-Shirley - 2025 D6

==== Girls ====
- Shrewsbury - 1989, 1991
- Ayer-Shirley - 2026 D6

=== Tennis ===
==== Boys ====
- Westborough - 1991, 2026 D2; 2016 D1

==== Girls ====
- Algonquin - 2009 D1

=== Spring golf ===
==== Girls ====
- Wachusett - 2024 D1
