= Davis Wolfgang Hawke =

American neo-Nazi and spammer

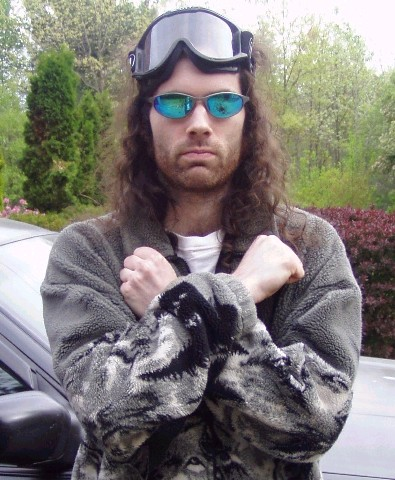
- Hawke in September 2005
- Born: Andrew Britt Greenbaum; October 21, 1978; Rhode Island, U.S.
- Disappeared: March 1, 2006; Laramie, Wyoming, U.S.
- Died: June 14, 2017 (aged 38); Squamish, British Columbia, Canada
- Cause of death: Gunshot wound
- Other names: Bo Decker; Dave Bridger; Walter Cross; Johnny Durango; Walter Smith; David A. Wallace; Jesse James
- Occupation: Entrepreneur
- Known for: E-mail spammer, neo-Nazi

Davis Wolfgang Hawke (born Andrew Britt Greenbaum; October 21, 1978 – June 14, 2017) was an American fraudster. In 2004, Hawke was sued by AOL under the CAN-SPAM Act of 2003 for spamming thousands of email addresses with millions of junk emails as part of his internet advertisement business for non-existent goods and services. Hawke had already gained media attention in 1999 as a college student for starting two neo-Nazi groups that publicly had the goal to "make the Final Solution a reality", before it was revealed that he had been hiding the fact that he was actually Jewish, leading to him being dubbed "Spam Nazi" by the press following the AOL lawsuit.

Hawke disappeared in 2006. He was found dead from a gunshot in a burned out car while under a fake name in Squamish, British Columbia, Canada, in 2017 and remained an unidentified decedent until he was identified in October 2020.

== Early life ==
Hawke was born in Rhode Island to Hyman Andrew Greenbaum and Peggy A. Greenbaum (née Davis). He grew up in Medfield, Massachusetts, outside of Boston, and according to his family, Hawke was bullied as a child for his small stature and Jewish background through his father, whose paternal grandfather was Jewish. Hawke later asserted that Greenbaum was his stepfather and that his biological father was a German immigrant surnamed "Dekker", who his mother supposedly had an affair with, a claim both of his parents denied. He graduated from Westwood High School in 1996, subsequently changing his name to Davis Wolfgang Hawke in 1997, after his 18th birthday. He went on to attend Wofford College in South Carolina, where he majored in German and history, completing three years.

Hawke was known to be an aficionado of chess. In high school, he achieved an Elo rating of nearly 2000 from the United States Chess Federation. In the late 1990s, Hawke played in South Carolina and Tennessee under the pseudonym Walter Smith. He played throughout Colorado as David A. Wallace on and off, before disappearing around the summer of 2006.

== Neo-Nazism ==
Between 1998 and 1999, while still in college, Hawke was a speaker and leader for two Neo-Nazi groups he started. Under the pseudonym of "Bo Decker", he began selling Nazi merchandise and offering membership to his internet neo-Nazi group "Knights of Freedom" – and later for the American Nationalist Party – out of Walpole, Massachusetts. His success was limited. His attempts at Nazi recruitment ended when a planned march in Washington resulted in almost no attendance, in the wake of his Jewish background being revealed. Other white nationalist groups also criticized Hawke, accusing his movement of being entirely virtual with no real world presence.

In March 1999, an article by the Southern Poverty Law Center made mention of his familial background, after which he was denounced by his constituents, including Tom Metzger, and threatened with legal actions by the Nationalist Movement if he continued to claim association. Hawke moved away from the college dormitory to a trailer 15 miles off campus and quit attending Wofford at the end of his semester. Following the Columbine High School massacre, Hawke was interviewed for a Fox News segment to provide insight into right-wing ideology, as the perpetrators Eric Harris and Dylan Klebold were known to have interests in neo-Nazism. Hawke's parents cut off contact with him after the footage aired, wherein he dismissively declared to hold no love for his parents, with his mother arguing that Hawke's online rhetoric "might have spurred [Harris and Klebold] on".

== Online activities ==
Left without his family's financial support, Hawke took to earning money over the internet by spamming. Over the years, Hawke used numerous aliases, even among his closest friends and business associates. During his time as a neo-Nazi, he referred to himself as Bo Decker. As a spammer, he typically went by aliases including Walter Cross, Johnny Durango, and Dave Bridger.

At a chess tournament in 2001, Hawke met Braden (Brad) Bournival, a New Hampshire high school student. Hawke tutored Bournival in the spam business, and, in 2003, they co-founded Quiksilver Enterprises and Amazing Internet Products, which had offices in Manchester, New Hampshire. Both were responsible for millions of spam mails for a range of products, including "human growth hormone, free government grants, inkjet-printer refills, extended car warranties [and] 'eBay secrets'", though their most common and successful venture were ads for an herbal (Yohimbe) "penis enhancement" pill called "Pinacle". By the summer of 2003, Amazing Internet Products was grossing around $500,000 per month.

One of Hawke's spam affiliates was Robby Todino, the so-called Time Travel Spammer.

In 2004 AOL won a $12.8-million judgment against Hawke in America Online, Inc. v. Davis Wolfgang Hawke, et al. AOL accused Hawke of violating anti-spam laws by sending unwanted emails to its subscribers and won its case in a default judgment against Hawke. On March 1, 2006, Hawke was reported missing from his last known residence in Laramie, Wyoming, by his parents.

On August 15, 2006, AOL announced their intention to search for buried gold and platinum ingots on the property of Hawke's parents in Medfield, Massachusetts. Hawke had previously claimed to have converted assets into precious metal and buried them. In 2007, AOL decided against the dig to search for the materials Hawke bragged about when he earned an estimated $600,000 for spamming ads for penis enlargement pills.

Hawke's rise and fall as a spammer was chronicled in the 2004 book Spam Kings by Brian S. McWilliams, in which he is the central case study.

== Death ==
Hawke was found shot to death and burned in his vehicle on Cheekye Forest Road in Squamish in 2017, where he had been living as a dirtbag climber under the name Jesse James. He is suspected to have been living there since the summer of 2006, with his first known online presence under the Jesse James alias being in 2014, but Hawke was not identified until October 2020. Police have ruled his death a homicide and were investigating links into possible criminal activity of Hawke in Canada. Brian McWilliams, who maintained contact with Hawke between 2003 and 2006, did not rule out the possibility that he may have committed suicide and staged his death as a murder. Hawke's family has issued a $10,000 reward for information that can help uncover the circumstances of his death.

== See also ==
- Horst Mahler - former Red Army Faction and Neo-Nazi with Jewish ancestry
- Frank Meeink - former white supremacist and Neo-Nazi with Jewish ancestry
- Bronze Age Pervert - an alt-right Romanian-American with a Jewish father
- Gerard Menuhin - the son of Yehudi Menuhin who has joined the Neo-Nazi movement in Germany
- Dan Burros – a Jewish American Ku Klux Klan leader
- Frank Collin – a Jewish American neo-Nazi
- Weev – a neo-Nazi of partial Jewish descent that writes for The Daily Stormer
- Ron Unz - a neo-Nazi, white supremacist and anti-semite with Jewish descent
- List of spammers
