= Westborough High School (Massachusetts) =

Secondary school in the United States

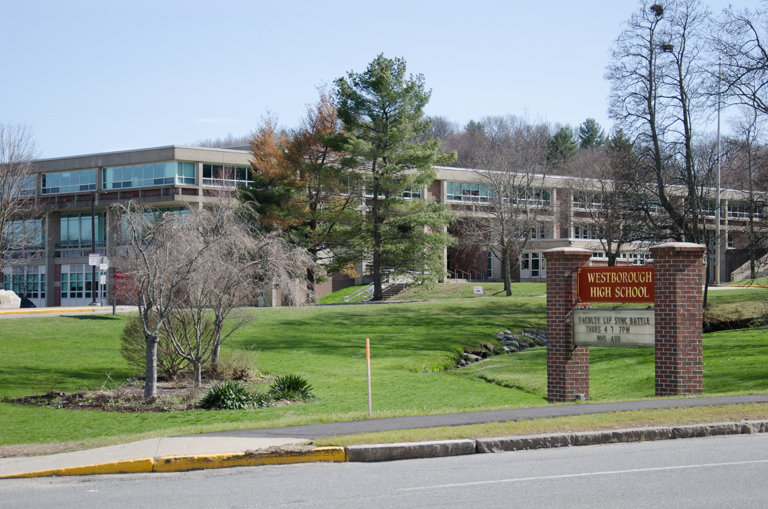

Location
- 90 W Main Street; Westborough, Massachusetts 01581; United States; 42°15′51.1″N 71°37′5.8″W

Information
- Type: Public secondary
- Established: 1968; 58 years ago
- School district: Westborough Public School District
- Principal: Brian Callaghan
- Teaching staff: 94.80 (FTE)
- Grades: 9-12
- Enrollment: 1,213 (2024–2025)
- Student to teacher ratio: 12.80
- Campus: Suburban
- Colors: Cardinal and navy blue
- Athletics: MIAA Division I
- Athletics conference: Midland Wachusett League
- Mascot: The Ranger
- Rival: Algonquin Regional High School
- Newspaper: The Lobby Observer
- Website: whs.westboroughk12.org

Westborough High School is a public high school in Westborough, Massachusetts, United States that serves as the high school for the Westborough Public School District. The school's mascot is the Ranger, and the school colors are cardinal and navy blue. In the 2022–23 school year, WHS had an enrollment of 1178 students. The school is located in the downtown Westborough area at 90 West Main Street.

== History ==
=== Previous locations ===
The first public school in Westborough was on Science Hill on School Street. Starting in 1854, Silas Stone taught 20 subjects. The school eventually became graded, and graduated its first class of three in 1872.

The first modern high school was built using donations from local philanthropists Frank and Fannie Forbes in 1926. A new high school was then built on Fisher Street in 1956. This later became the middle school as growth in student population forced the need to construct the existing building in 1968.

=== Property history ===
The property was first built upon by Thomas Rice in 1675; he built a garrison house. In the mid-1800s, box factory and hotel owner Christopher Whitney built a mansion on the site. The property was sold in 1920 to the Aronson cattle dealers, who hosted regular cattle auctions on the site.

Two infamous events have occurred on the property that was to become Westborough High School. This first was the capturing of the five Rice boys by the Canawaugha Indian tribe from present-day Canada. The second was the 1953 tornado that struck the Aronson property and fields, killing three of the Aronsons and a hired man.

== Academics ==
=== Standardized test scores ===
On the 2013 MCAS test, sophomores at Westborough High School ranked 105 of 354 schools in English, 59 of 354 in math, and 15 of 344 in science and technology. The school had 97% of test takers place in the advanced or proficient categories in English, compared to the state average of 91%. In math, this percentage was 92% compared to the state's 90%, and a 94% in science and technology compared to the state average of 71%.

=== Advanced Placement courses ===
Westborough High School offers AP courses in microeconomics, computer science, 3D design portfolio, studio art 2D, music theory, calculus AB, calculus BC, statistics, biology, chemistry, United States history, French, Spanish, and English literature and allows its students to take AP courses through the Virtual High School program. 59.6% of students at WHS take at least one AP course before they graduate.

=== Honor societies ===
Westborough High School has an active chapter of the National Honor Society, which meets monthly. The NHS chapter runs a free tutoring service available to all Westborough public school attendees.

== Athletics ==
Varsity sports
Season	Boys	Girls
Fall	football, golf, cross country, soccer	field hockey, soccer, volleyball, cross country
Winter	basketball, ice hockey, swimming, skiing, indoor track and field	basketball, swimming, skiing, gymnastics, indoor track and field
Spring	baseball, lacrosse, tennis, outdoor track and field	softball, lacrosse, tennis, golf, outdoor track and field

== Fine arts ==
Westborough offers the following curricular music ensembles:

- String orchestra
- Concert band
- Symphonic band
- Mixed chorus
- Women's chorale
- Concert choir
- Full orchestra

The following extracurricular ensembles run outside of class time:

- Honors string quartet
- String chamber ensemble
- Marching band
- Repertoire jazz band
- Festival jazz band
- Saxophone quartet
- Woodwind quintet
- Percussion ensemble
- Harmony in Heels (SSAA a cappella)
- Don't Panic (SATB a cappella)
- Members Only (TTBB a cappella)
- Double Take (SSAA a cappella)
- Chamber singers

=== Honor societies ===
Westborough High School's chapter of the Tri-M Music Honor Society is chapter 3311.

=== Theater ===
Center Stage, the Westborough High School theater group, puts on three shows per academic year: a play in November, a musical in March, and a small piece or one-act festival in May.
