= Tri-Valley League (MIAA) =

High school athletic league

The Tri-Valley League or TVL is a high school athletic league located in towns in Middlesex and Norfolk counties, Massachusetts. The league was founded in 1966 by principals and Alfred “Hap’’ Mazukina, who served as the league's commissioner for 23 years. In its infancy the TVL struggled, but over the years it has undergone changes, and it is now regarded as one of the most respected high school sports leagues in Massachusetts.

The league's name is based on the geography of the area, the river valleys of the Charles River, Blackstone River and Taunton River all converge in the region.

== Members ==
There are 12 Schools representing 13 towns in the Tri-Valley League. Since the league's induction there have been several membership changes.

Tri-Valley League
Locations of Tri-Valley League members, 2021-2022 full member
- The Ashland High School "Clockers", left the Dual County League and joined the TVL in the early 1970s.
- The Bellingham High School "Blackhawks", original 1966 TVL member.
- The Dedham High School "Marauders", joined in the 2017-18 season, formerly of the Bay State Conference.
- The Dover-Sherborn High School "Raiders", original 1966 TVL member, and the only multi-town school in the league.
- The Hopkinton High School "Hillers", original 1966 TVL member.
- The Holliston High School "Panthers", original 1966 TVL member.
- The Medfield High School "Warriors", original 1966 TVL member.
- The Medway High School "Mustangs", original 1966 TVL member.
- The Millis High School "Mohawks", original 1966 TVL member.
- The Norton High School "Lancers", original 1966 TVL member.
- The Norwood High School "Mustangs", left the Bay State Conference after the 2017-18 school year.
- The Westwood High School "Wolverines", left the Dual County League and joined the TVL in the early 1970s.

Former members included Blackstone-Millville, Nipmuc, Hopedale, Blackstone Valley Tech, and Norfolk County Agriculture

School	Colors	Mascot	Enrollment	Division
Ashland	Royal Blue and White	Clockers	870	Large
Bellingham	Black and White	Blackhawks	620	Small
Dedham	Maroon and Grey	Marauders	726	Large
Dover-Sherborn	Blue, Black, and White	Raiders	648	Small
Hopkinton	Green, Orange, and White	Hillers	1,236	Large
Holliston	Red, Black, and White	Panthers	800	Large
Medfield	Navy Blue, White and Carolina Blue	Warriors	699	Small
Medway	Navy Blue and White	Mustangs	607	Small
Millis	Maroon and Silver	Mohawks	317	Small
Norton	Purple and Black	Lancers	682	Small
Norwood	Blue and White	Mustangs	946	Large
Westwood	Forest Green and White	Wolverines	874	Large

== History ==
The TVL was formed by 12 schools who were either former members of the Southern County League or independently organized their own schedules. The teams were divided into 2 divisions, Millis, Medway, Medfield, Dover-Sherborn, Holliston and Hopkinton in the Eastern Division; and Bellingham, Norton, Hopedale, Nipmuc, Norfolk Agricultural and Blackstone (which merged with Millville in 1967) in the Western Division.

In the inaugural 1966–67 season the schools competed in football, basketball, baseball, track and tennis. Millis, Medway, Medfield, Dover-Sherborn, Holliston, Hopkinton and Norton had football teams that year and Bellingham entered a team in the following 1967-68 season.

In the founding seasons, girls sports were not scheduled through the league, schedules for girls sports were organized independently by school. It was not until 1972 that Title IX was passed that stated, "No person in the United States shall, on the basis of sex, be excluded from participation in, be denied the benefits of, or be subjected to discrimination under any education program or activity receiving Federal financial assistance." The title was signed at the collegiate level but after its passing the TVL also included girls sports in its scheduling.

In the early days of the TVL. The smaller schools were not able to compete with those with larger enrollments, so defections started to occur. Norton left for another league and the principals welcomed Blackstone Valley Tech to replace Norton. Norfolk Aggie, Hopedale, Nipmuc, Blackstone-Millville and BVT left the TVL with the creation of the Dual Valley Conference (DVC). After the creation of the DVC the TVL was left with only seven members. Ashland and Westwood wanted out of the Dual County League and gained TVL membership in the early 1970s. In 2002, Norton was readmitted, as the 10th member. In 2017 Dedham joined the TVL from the Bay State Conference as the 11th member. Norwood also from the Bay State Conference became the league's 12th member a year later.

The 12 schools that currently comprise the league are Ashland, Bellingham, Dedham, Dover-Sherborn, Holliston, Hopkinton, Medfield, Medway, Millis, Norton, Norwood, and Westwood.

== Athletics ==
Some or all of the schools in the league compete in the following sports:

- Baseball (boys)
- Basketball (boys/girls)
- Cheerleading (mixed teams)
- Soccer (boys/girls)
- Volleyball (boys/girls)
- Cross Country (mixed teams)
- Field Hockey (girls)
- Golf (mixed teams)
- Gymnastics (mixed teams)
- Ice Hockey (boys/girls)
- Lacrosse (boys/girls)
- Outdoor Track (mixed teams)
- Skiing (mixed teams)
- Softball (girls)
- Swimming (mixed teams)
- Tennis (boys/girls)
- Spring Track (mixed teams)
- Wrestling (boys)
- Ultimate Frisbee (mixed teams)

== Alumni ==
- Ricky Santos, Bellingham, Football
- Kenny Florian, Dover-Sherborn, Soccer
- Keegan Bradley, Hopkinton, Golf
- Jon Curran, Hopkinton, Golf
- Mark Sweeney, Holliston, Baseball
- Kara Wolters, Holliston, Basketball
- Uzo Aduba, Medfield, Track
- Steve Berthiaume, Medfield, Cross Country
- Jackie MacMullan, Westwood, Basketball
- Matthew Boldy, Medway, Hockey
- Kristen Kjellman, Westwood, Lacrosse
