= Concord-Carlisle High School =

Public high school in Concord, Massachusetts, United States

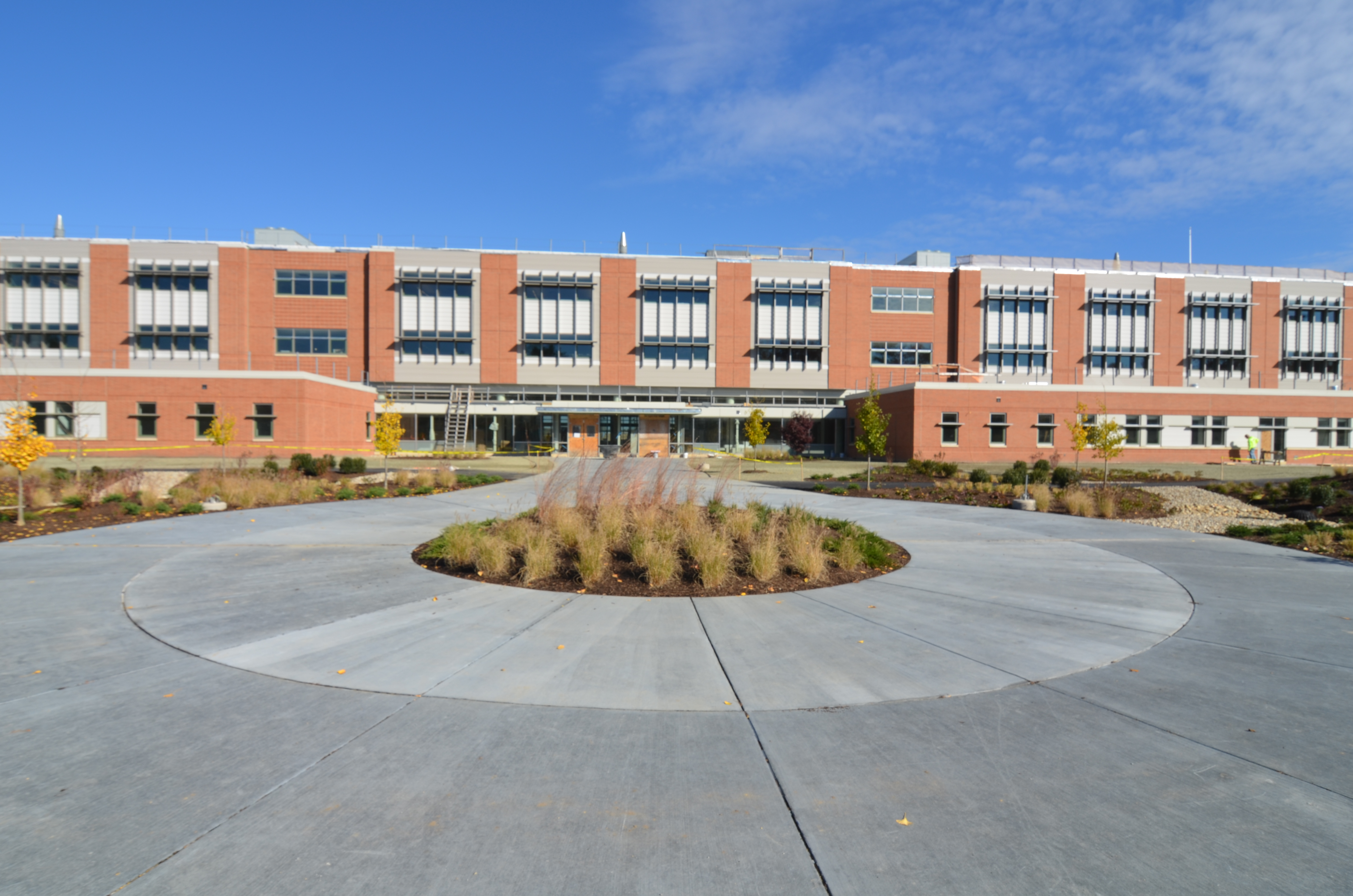
- Concord-Carlisle High School

Location
- 500 Walden Street; Concord, MA 01742; United States; 42°26′54.29″N 71°20′50.81″W

Information
- Type: Public high school
- Motto: Commitment, Citizenship, Harmony, Scholarship
- Established: 1852
- School district: Concord-Carlisle Regional School District
- Co-Principal: Brian Miller
- Co-Principal: Katie Stahl
- Staff: 105.07 (FTE)
- Grades: 9–12
- Student to teacher ratio: 11.71
- Campus size: 80 acres (32 ha)
- Colors: Maroon and white
- Athletics: 56 teams
- Athletics conference: Dual County League
- Mascot: The Patriot
- Nickname: Patriots
- Budget: $28,699,553 total $21,505 per pupil (2016)
- Website: concordcarlisle.org

Concord-Carlisle High School (CCHS) is a public high school located in Concord, Massachusetts, United States. It is 17 miles (27 km) northwest of Boston. The school serves grades 9–12, and as part of the Concord-Carlisle Regional School District has students from both Concord and Carlisle, Massachusetts. The school has a notable portion of minority students from Boston (particularly Dorchester, Mattapan, and Roxbury) enrolled as part of the METCO program.

== Academics ==
Class subjects include core subjects of English, mathematics, science, and social studies, but a number of elective studies are offered as well, including programming, engineering, art, music, and photography.

For students' freshman and sophomore years, they are required to take world cultures and US history, respectively, neither of which are levelled classes. The English department offers classes on topics such as rhetoric and debate, American literature, British literature, contemporary literature, world literature, and Black literature. The social studies department curriculum includes classes on ancient Greece, ancient Rome, and 20th-century United States history, as well as psychology, economics, sociology, world religions, and Russian history.

Foreign languages offered are French, Spanish, Latin, and Chinese.

== Extracurriculars ==
The school supports a moot court, Spectrum: Gay/Straight Alliance, Dance Crew, The Voice (newspaper), Reflections (a literature and art review), yearbook club, several foreign language clubs (Spanish, French, as well as an Asian culture club), and high school radio station (WIQH 88.3 FM), among others. Concord-Carlisle also hosts local chapters of Key Club International, Model United Nations, Amnesty International, Interact Club, Junior State of America, the Innocence Project, Academic Bowl, Robotics Team, Science Olympiad, and a Math Team.

== Athletics ==
CCHS supports all of the 34 available sports teams organized by the Massachusetts Interscholastic Athletic Association (MIAA).

In most sports, Concord Carlisle competes in the Dual County League.

CCHS also offers a squash club in the winter.

=== Ultimate frisbee ===
As of 2025, Concord Carlisle has a varsity ultimate frisbee team.

=== Football ===
The Patriots football team has won a pair of Massachusetts Super Bowls, in 1978 and 2011. Those teams were coached respectively by Al Robichaud, a member of the Massachusetts Football Coaches Hall of Fame and the Concord Carlisle Athletic Hall of Fame, and his son Michael Robichaud.

=== Cross country ===
The school has both a girls and boys cross-country team. In 2017, the boys’ team came in fourth in the Massachusetts Division 1 state meet, while the girls’ team won. In 2018, the boys' team won the state meet and the girls' team came in second. In 2019, the girls' team won the state meet. The boys' team placed third.

=== Fencing ===
Concord-Carlisle's fencing team was founded in 1965 by Elliot Lilien, who taught and coached at the school before going on to coach fencing at Brown University. This winter sport has men's and women's teams, with JV and Varsity levels. CCHS's fencing team has produced two individual Olympic Champions, and numerous individual state champions.

=== Swimming and diving ===
The girls' swimming and diving team has won two Massachusetts Swimming & Diving State Championships, claiming back-to-back MIAA Division 1 State Championships in 2024 and 2025.

One of the largest sports team at the school, there are members every year who make it to the Sectionals and State meets.

The diving team has produced several individual state champions.

=== Skiing ===
Nationally recognized in 1998 as a top ski school, the team competes at a local ski area in both slalom and giant slalom races. Dr. Bob Furey, head ski coach since 1972, was awarded the National Coaches Association Ski Coach of the Year Award in the early 1990s. Johnstone retired in 2007. In 2007, he was awarded a Boston Globe All-Scholastic Coach of the Year. The team practices at Nashoba Ski Valley.

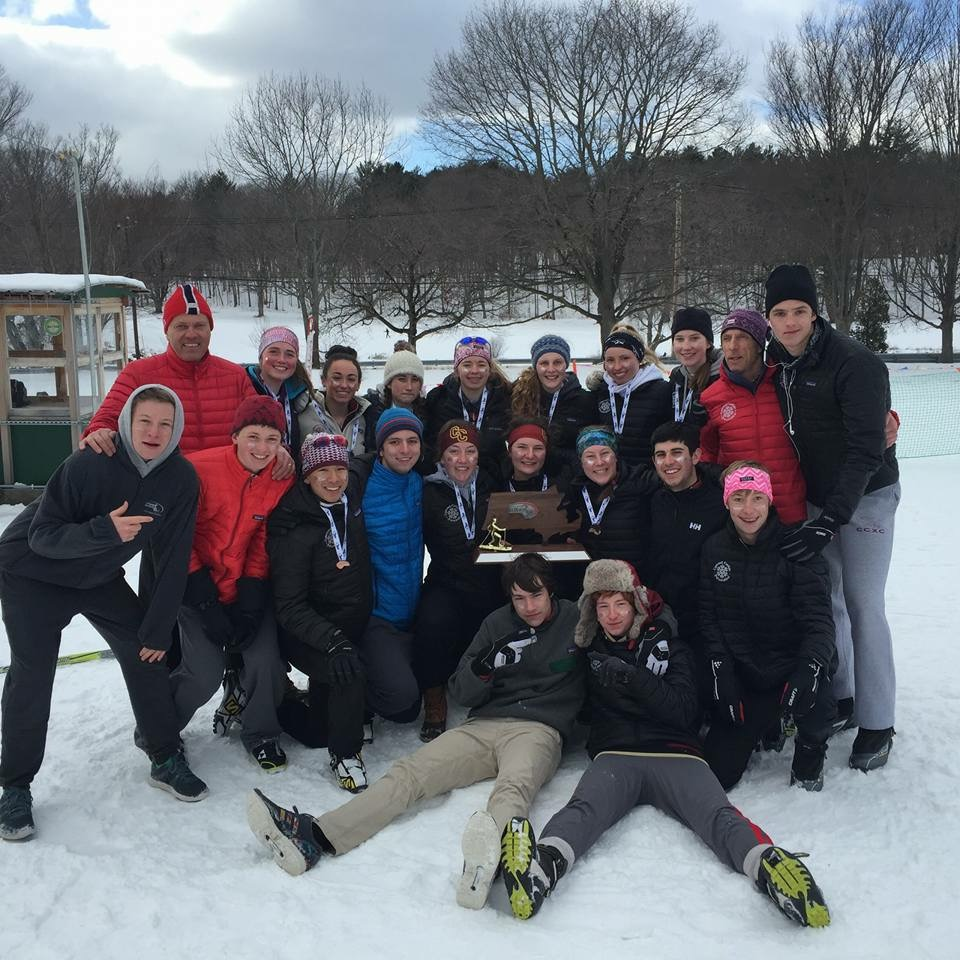
The 2016 Nordic state team

The Nordic ski team won the Mass Bay West Divisional title for both the girls' varsity and boys' varsity team. The team also did well in state competitions: the girls' team secured second place and the boys' team had a close third-place finish.

In 2018, after an undefeated regular season for both the boys' and girls' teams, the boys' team won the state championship.

=== Soccer ===
The CCHS girls soccer team has many accomplishments including undefeated seasons and many division titles. In addition, they have progressed to the state finals multiple times and years in a row.

=== Tennis ===
CCHS boasts highly successful boys and girls tennis teams, with the girls team having won 16 times and the boys team having won 11 times, the third most out of any high school in the state. The boys last won the state championship in 2022, while girls last won the state finals in 2015.

=== Lacrosse ===
CCHS has both boys and girls varsity and junior varsity lacrosse teams.

== New school building project ==
Concord Carlisle High School moved to a new, eco-friendly building in mid-April 2015, after almost 18 years of planning. The old school, which featured a one-level "California Layout," was constructed in the 1960s and 1970s. However, the design was deemed unsuitable for the weather and conditions prevalent in Massachusetts. In 2011, the towns of Concord and Carlisle granted initial approval for the construction of a new school. The project took approximately four years to complete and is located behind the previous CCHS building, with a reversed orientation. The total cost of the project was $93 million.

The new school has a 600-seat auditorium, 2 attached gyms, and a 'media wall' consisting of 9 flat-screen televisions in the cafeteria. The new building also includes many updated safety features that the old building lacked, including fewer exits and entrances, and automated doors with security cameras and alarms.

On September 6, 2022, voters elected to raise taxes by an estimated $660,822 in order to redesign and rebuild the school's access road.

== Antisemitism allegations and settlement ==
Concord Carlisle High School has been accused of antisemitism due to a student leaving their school "to escape the uncontrolled anti-semitic bullying and retaliation he experienced as a student at Concord-Carlisle." The student was apparently bullied due to his Jewish heritage, with bullies' reasons being as such, "Because [he] is a Jew." Antisemitic graffiti has been spotted in bathrooms, leading the students to found a club known as the "Jewish Student Union". According to an interview from The Bridge, participants in the club as well as creators say that school officials denied the creation of a Jew club, while allowing other clubs such as Asian Student Union, Black Student Union, and South Asian Student Society.

In 2026, the U.S. Dept. of Justice concluded an investigation into the district and found that it had failed to adequately respond to reports of antisemitic harassment, creating a hostile environment for Jewish students. The Department announced a formal settlement agreement requiring the district to implement comprehensive corrective measures, including policy reforms, staff training, improved reporting systems, and federal oversight to address and prevent further civil rights violations.

== Notable alumni ==
- Chester G. Atkins, former Congressman from Massachusetts's 5th congressional district
- Liz Cho, television journalist, WABC-TV New York
- Clairo, indie-pop musician
- Bob Diamond, former chief executive officer of Barclays
- Will Eno, American playwright and Pulitzer Prize finalist
- Kristin Hedstrom, USA rowing national team member and London 2012 Olympian
- Michael C. Moynihan, Emmy award-winning journalist and television host
- Sam Presti, general manager of the NBA's Oklahoma City Thunder
- John Tortorella, head coach of the Vegas Golden Knights of the NHL
