= Millis High School =

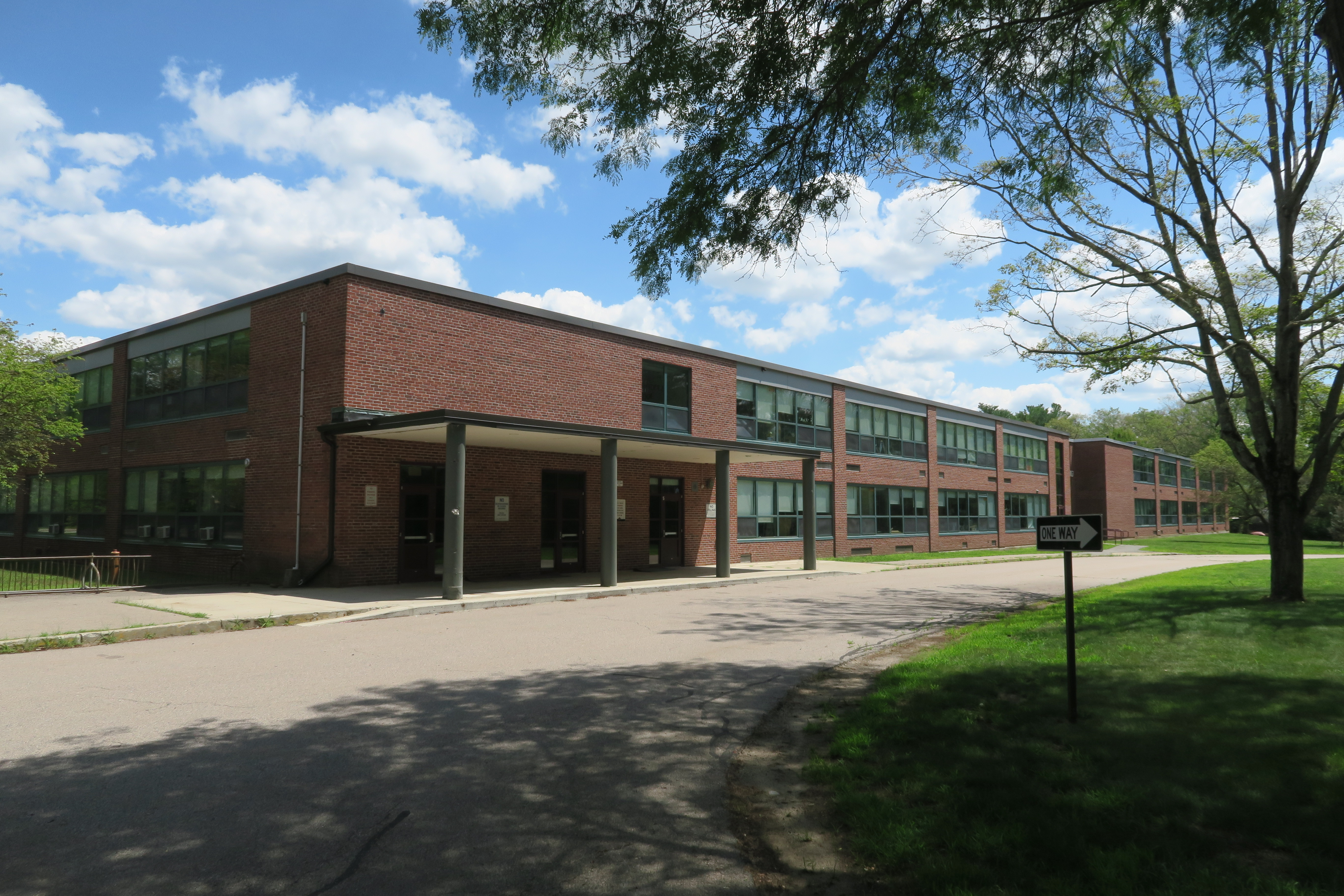

Location
- 245 Plain Street; Millis, Massachusetts 02054; United States; 42°09′45″N 71°21′30″W

Information
- Type: Public high school Open enrollment
- Motto: "Small school, big family"
- Established: 1960
- Superintendent: Robert Mullaney
- Principal: Patrick Nash
- Faculty: 29.00 (FTE)
- Grades: 9–12
- Enrollment: 317 (2023-24)
- Student to teacher ratio: 10.93
- Campus size: 16 acres
- Colors: Maroon & Silver
- Athletics conference: Tri-Valley League
- Nickname: Mohawks
- Accreditation: New England Association of Schools and Colleges
- Newspaper: The Mohawk Post
- Website: millisps.org

Millis High School is a public high school in Millis, Massachusetts, United States. The school building consists of both the middle school and high school.

== Enrollment ==
Millis High School is a public academic institution accredited by the New England Association of Schools and Colleges with an enrollment of 317 students in grades 9–12 in the 2023–2024 school year.

== History ==
On April 14, 1973, Aerosmith played a concert at the school.

Millis High School was ranked on the 2020 U.S. News & World Report America's Best High Schools list in the top 7% of schools in the United States, 55th of Boston/Metro Area High schools, and 73rd amongst Massachusetts High Schools.

In 1999, Millis Middle/High School underwent a complete renovation.

Millis came in tenth in the state in the Math portion of the MCAS in 2006, while also ranking first in the state with Boston Latin School for English MCAS scores.

In 2007, Millis was awarded the Blue Ribbon School Of Excellence award by the Federal Government under the No Child Left Behind Act.

== Athletics ==
=== Girls volleyball ===
The girls' volleyball team for Millis has had some success over the past couple years. Div. III State Champs '03, South Sectional Champs '03, Eastern Mass Champs '03, Central Sectional Champs '07, Div. III State Champs '08, Central Sectional Champs '08, Central Sectional Champs '10, Central Sectional Champs '11.

=== Boys volleyball ===
The boys' volleyball were state champions in 2003.

=== Football ===
The Millis High School football team won the State Championship in 1980, 1994, 1999, 2016 and 2017. Notable alumni, Ryan Daniel and Brian Kraby. Brian is remembered for playing with a neck roll in the 1990s and "frolicking" in the woods at high school parties.

=== Boys soccer ===
The boys' soccer team went to the state tournament in 1995 and 1998.

=== Girls soccer ===
The girls varsity soccer team were the South Sectional Championship in the fall of 2009 and were named Division III State Champions.

=== Boys ice hockey ===
Students from Millis High School and Hopedale High School have joined to form the Hopedale/Millis hockey team. The team plays in the Central Mass. Russell Conference. Home games are played at the Blackstone Valley IcePlex in Hopedale, Massachusetts.

=== Girls ice hockey ===
Girls in grades 7–12 at Millis combine with other high school students from Medway, Ashland, and Holliston and play on the Medway/Ashland girls hockey team. They have been a team for 3 years and have qualified for the MIAA Division 1 state tournament each year.

=== Girls basketball ===
Girls basketball qualified for the MIAA tournament every year since 2002. In the 2008–09 season they became the Division 4 State Champions. They repeated as Division 4 State Champions in 2014–15.

Accomplishments:

- State Champions: 2009, 2014, 2015

=== Boys basketball ===
The boys basketball team in 2011–2012 had a record of 4–7. They qualified for MIAA Division 4 state tournament, won their preliminary against C.A.S.H and went on to beat Holbrook, the top seed in their division with a score of 49–42. They lost their second-round game to Cathedral.

=== Cheerleading ===
The Varsity Cheerleading squad combined with Hopedale in 2012. Tri-Valley League Champs '77, '80.

=== Track ===
Millis has both boys and girls indoor and outdoor, track. Indoor track is during the winter and outdoor track is in the spring. In the 2009–10 winter track season, Millis high jumper Corey Fairfield won five state championships. State Champs 80.

=== Baseball ===
Tri-Valley League Champs '73, '81, Eastern Mass South Sectional Champs '73, '87..

=== Softball ===
In the 2012 season the team qualified for state tournament, winning their preliminary round game against Old Colony Regional Voc. Tech. Tri-Valley League Champs '71, '81. Eastern South Sectional Champs '04.
