= Dover-Sherborn High School =

Coordinates: 42°13′01.41″N 71°19′21.24″W

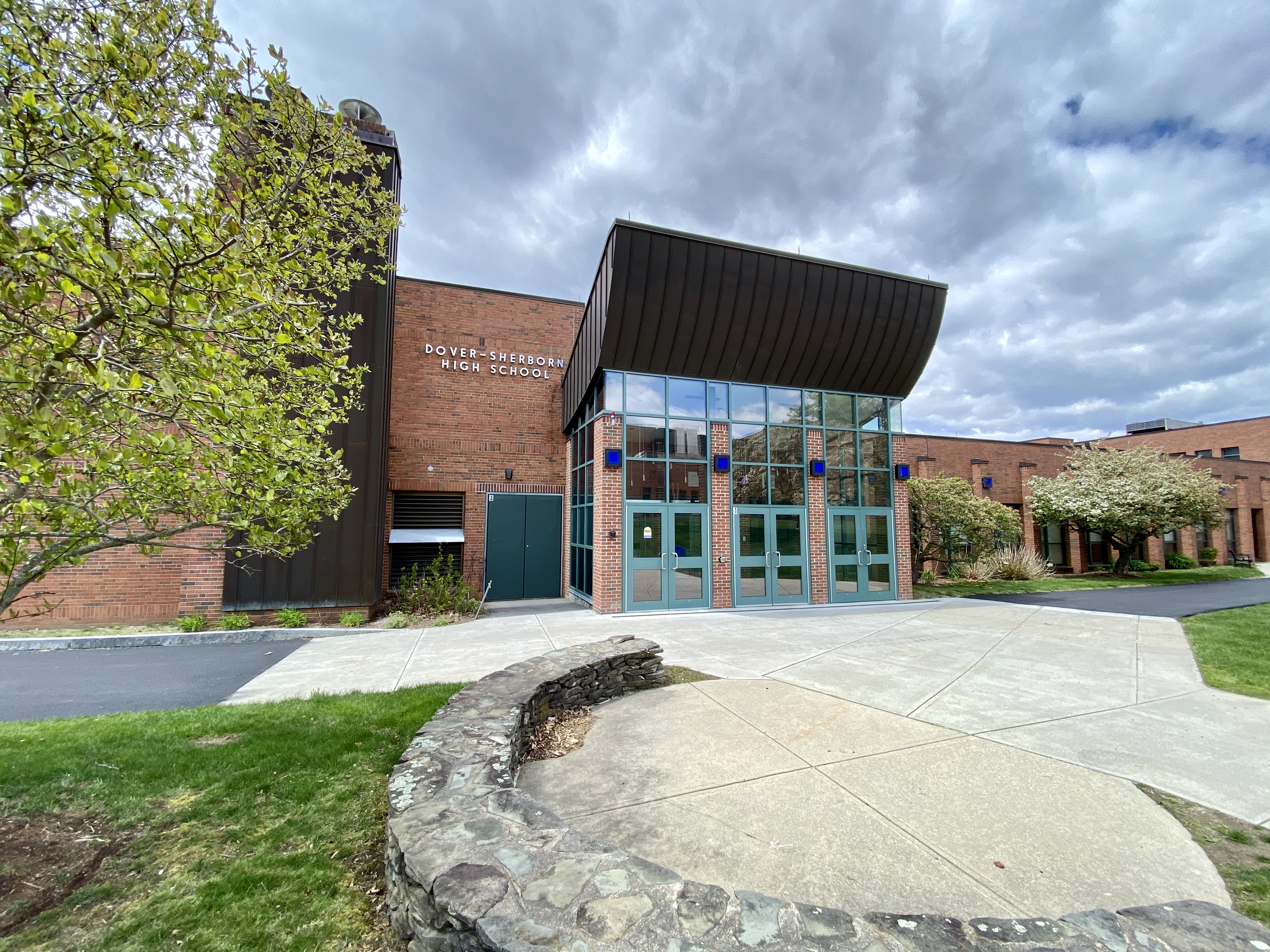
- 9 Junction Street; Dover, Massachusetts 02030; United States

Information
- Type: Public secondary
- Established: 1962
- Headmaster: John G. Smith
- Teaching staff: 57.91 (FTE)
- Grades: 9–12
- Enrollment: 648 (2023-24)
- Student to teacher ratio: 11.19
- Campus: Country
- Colors: Blue, white and yellow
- Athletics conference: Tri-Valley League
- Mascot: Raider
- Website: hs.doversherborn.org

Dover-Sherborn High School, or DSHS, is a regional public high school in the town of Dover, Massachusetts, United States. It serves students from the towns of Dover and Sherborn and is the senior school of the Dover-Sherborn Public School District, housing grades 9 through 12. It also hosts some METCO students. It was rated by Boston Magazine as the top public high school in Boston in 2019. It was rated by Boston Magazine as the top public high school in Greater Boston in 2024. The principal is John Smith.

== History ==
Until the 1960s, Dover and Sherborn sent their high school students to neighboring towns' high schools (Needham for Dover and Framingham for Sherborn). By the 1950s, the population boom was making it difficult for those schools to accept outside students, and the two towns created a regional school district. The first building was constructed on Farm Street in 1962. As the population continued to increase, the current high school was built on the same campus and completed in 1968. In 2004, a $43 million renovation on the campus was completed, which included a renovation of the high school building, the razing of the middle school (the original high school building), and the new construction of the middle school. The other schools in the district are Dover Sherborn Middle School (DSMS), Pine Hill School, and Chickering School. The current principal of Dover Sherborn High School is John Smith, accompanied by assistant principal Timothy O'Mara.

Other administrators include Allison Collins (Mathematics Dept.), Christopher Levasseur (Science Dept.), Keith Kaplan (Social Studies Dept.), Gretchen Donohue (English Dept.), Jeffrey Farris (World Language Dept.), Geoffrey Herrmann (Fine & Performing Arts Dept.), Nicholas Grout (Technology & Engineering Dept.), and Laura McGovern (Wellness Dept.). Ellen Rowley is the guidance director, Brandon Hall is the technology manager, and Mimi Ferrick is the special education director.

In March 2020, the unprecedented disruptions of the COVID-19 pandemic caused the school to transition to remote learning for the remainder of the academic year.

== Academics ==
Academically, the Dover-Sherborn High School has been historically ranked as one of Massachusetts' top-performing public schools. In 2014, Boston Magazine rated Dover-Sherborn High School as the best public school in Greater Boston. In 2015, the Newsweek magazine ranked Dover-Sherborn High School as the 16th best high school in the country. From 2011 to 2019, Boston Magazine ranked the Dover-Sherborn School System as number one in Massachusetts. US News recognized this by including DSHS amongst the top 100 public high schools in America.

For the 2006–2007 school year, DSHS tenth-grade students ranked fourth in English and math among their peers on the Massachusetts Comprehensive Assessment System (MCAS) exam. Ninety-six percent of the class of 2006 took the SAT I and 56% scored over 600 in the verbal section, 65% scored over 600 in the math section, and 58% scored over 600 in the writing section. About 97% of all graduates attend college or university.

== Extracurricular activities ==
The school offers sports including American football, soccer, cross country, golf, field hockey, basketball, alpine and Nordic skiing, swimming, baseball, softball, lacrosse, indoor and outdoor track and field, tennis, ice hockey, gymnastics, and sailing.

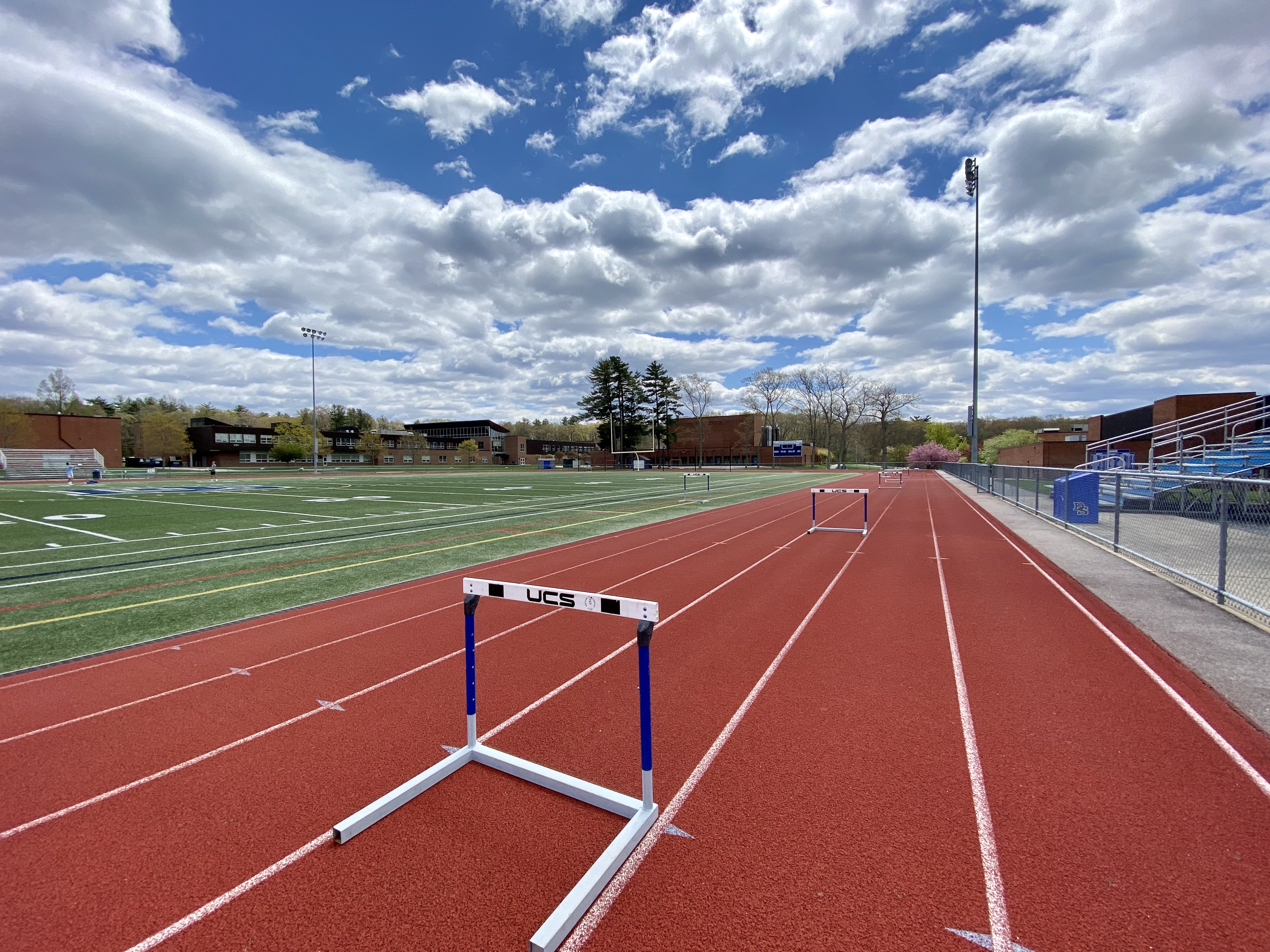
DSHS Athletic field

The school is part of The Education Co-operative (TEC), which allows DSHS students to take part in internships with local companies and also enroll in TEC classes.

The chess team became league champions in 2007. A DSHS student project officially represented MA State at the International Science and Engineering Fair hosted by Intel in 2006. In 2007, DSHS became home to a Siemens Competition semifinalist. [9] The school's mock trial team reached the semi-finals of the Massachusetts Bar Association's Mock Trial Tournament in 2023 and 2024 and reached the finals in 2026.

The school's Drama Department puts on two productions each year: an autumn play and a spring musical. The program is supported by the local community through organizations such as Friends of the Performing Arts, The Mudge Foundation, The Dover-Sherborn Education Fund, and Len Schnabel of DesignLight. Theater productions are performed primarily at The Mudge Auditorium in the Lindquist Commons building. Some local productions are also performed at the Sherborn Community Center/1858 Town House.

=== Athletics ===
DSHS shares several of its sports programs with other schools. The boys' ice hockey program is shared with Weston High School, the girls' ice hockey program is shared with Hopkinton High School, and the gymnastics program is shared with Medfield High School and Ashland High School. In the past, the Boys and Girls Swim & Dive program has been shared with Medfield High School.

==== State Championships ====
- Girls Soccer: (2011)
- Boys Soccer: (1992, 2010, 2024)
- Field Hockey: (2019)
- Golf: (2021, 2023)
- Boys Basketball: (1980–1981, 2018–2019)
- Boys' Ice Hockey: (2023-2024)
- Boys Alpine: (1981-1982 (??), 1985–1986, 2014–2015)
- Girls Tennis: (1994, 2009)
- Boys Tennis: (1985)
- Boys Lacrosse: (2012, 2013, 2015, 2016, 2019, 2021)
- Girls Lacrosse: (2021)

== Notable alumni ==
- Dan Bennett, Class of 1980, prosecutor, former Massachusetts Secretary of Public Safety and Security
- Paul Calello, Class of 1979, Chairman of Credit Suisse
- Eli Dershwitz, Class of 2014, 2023 World Saber Champion, 2015 Under-20 World Saber Champion, and US Olympic saber fencer
- Stephanie Deshpande, Class of 1993, contemporary American painter
- Kenny Florian, Class of 1994, retired professional mixed martial artist for the Ultimate Fighting Championship, Fox/UFC analyst
- Dan Itse, Class of 1976, engineer, inventor, and member of the New Hampshire House of Representatives
- Marilyn Mosby, Class of 1998, lawyer, former State's Attorney for Baltimore City, convicted felon.
- Chad Urmston, Class of 1994, singer-songwriter of Dispatch and State Radio
- Laila Lockhart Kraner, actress
