= Norfolk County Agricultural High School =

Public school in Massachusetts, United States

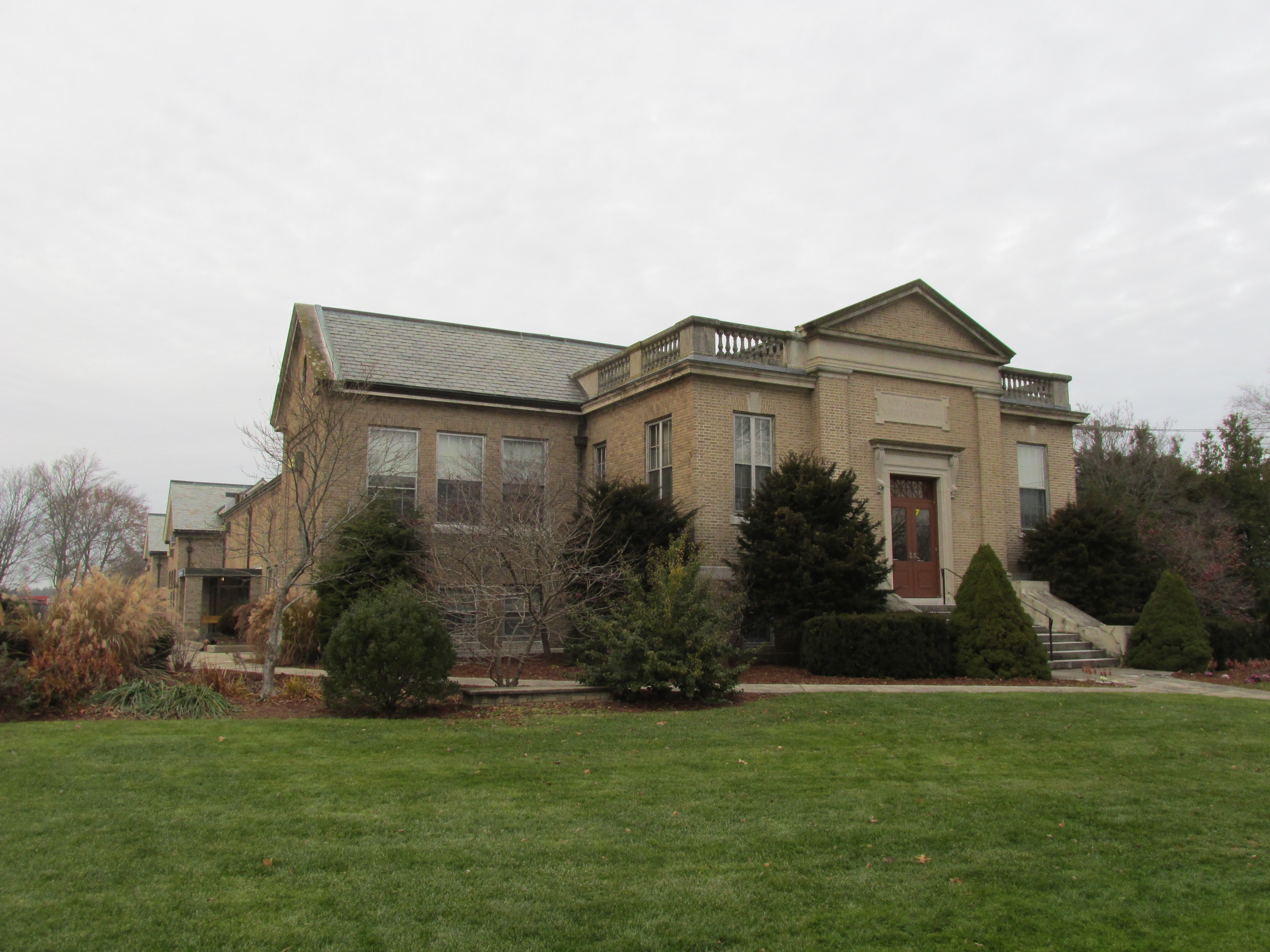

Location
- 400 Main Street; Walpole, Massachusetts 02081; United States; 42.165217°N 71.241403°W

Information
- School type: secondary, agricultural
- Established: 1917
- Superintendent: John E. Martin
- CEEB code: 222172
- Principal: Robin VanRotz
- Teaching staff: 58.19 (FTE)
- Grades: 9–12
- Gender: All Gender
- Enrollment: 586 (as of 2023-2024)
- Average class size: 140
- Student to teacher ratio: 10.07
- Campus size: 365 acres (1.48 km^{2})
- Campus type: Outdoor
- Colors: Blue and Gold
- Slogan: We are work-ready. We are world-ready. We are life-ready. We are Norfolk Aggie.
- Athletics: Baseball, basketball, co-ed golf, cross country, dance, soccer, softball, volleyball
- Athletics conference: Mayflower League
- Mascot: Rammers the Sheep
- Nickname: Norfolk Aggie
- Team name: Rams
- Newspaper: Aggie Times
- Budget: $15,745,539.94 total $27,804.24 per pupil (2023)
- Website: www.norfolkaggie.org

Norfolk County Agricultural High School is a public high school in Walpole, Massachusetts, United States. The school offers specialty training to students who are interested in pursuing careers in Animal and Marine Science, Plant and Environmental Science, and Diesel and Mechanical Technology. The school is one of only three in Massachusetts to promote agriscience and agribusiness opportunities, as well as one of four in the nation. NCAHS has a high retention rate and a low dropout rate (0% in the 2015-2016 school year).

== Campus ==
The school has several buildings. Kemp Hall is the main academic building. There is a new animal science building, a new agricultural mechanics building, and a plant science building with four greenhouses. There is also an old administrative building and another building with a computer lab, library and cafeteria. Two new buildings were completed in 2014; the new History and English department called Avery Hall, and the new Administration and mathematics building, called McFarland hall. The school has two softball/baseball fields and two soccer fields. The campus also has two outdoor equestrian rings, an indoor ring with a newly built horse barn, and an AKC-certified dog ring.

== Curriculum ==
Students follow a comprehensive curriculum composed of academic and vocational courses. The school offers three program majors: Diesel and Mechanical Technology, Animal and Marine Science, and Plant and Environmental Science. Students choose a specific interest within one of the three program majors at the end of grade 10. Upperclassmen have the opportunity to acquire on-the-job training and demonstrate work readiness through the Cooperative Education Program. The school has exchange programs with Cummings School of Veterinary Medicine at Tufts University.

== Extracurricular activities ==
Student groups and activities at Norfolk County Agricultural High School include agricultural mechanics club, marine club, animal science club, conservation club, equestrian drill team, FFA, floriculture club, horse club, research animal technology club, kennel club, landscape club, math club, National Honor Society, newspaper, peer network, student council, Team Harmony, and veterinarian assistant club. The school has also recently gained an Art Club, and is working towards a Theatre club as well.

The school's athletic teams, known as the Norfolk Aggie Rams, compete in the Massachusetts Interscholastic Athletic Association Mayflower League. Teams are fielded in baseball, basketball, golf, cross country, soccer, softball and volleyball.
