= Ashland High School (Massachusetts) =

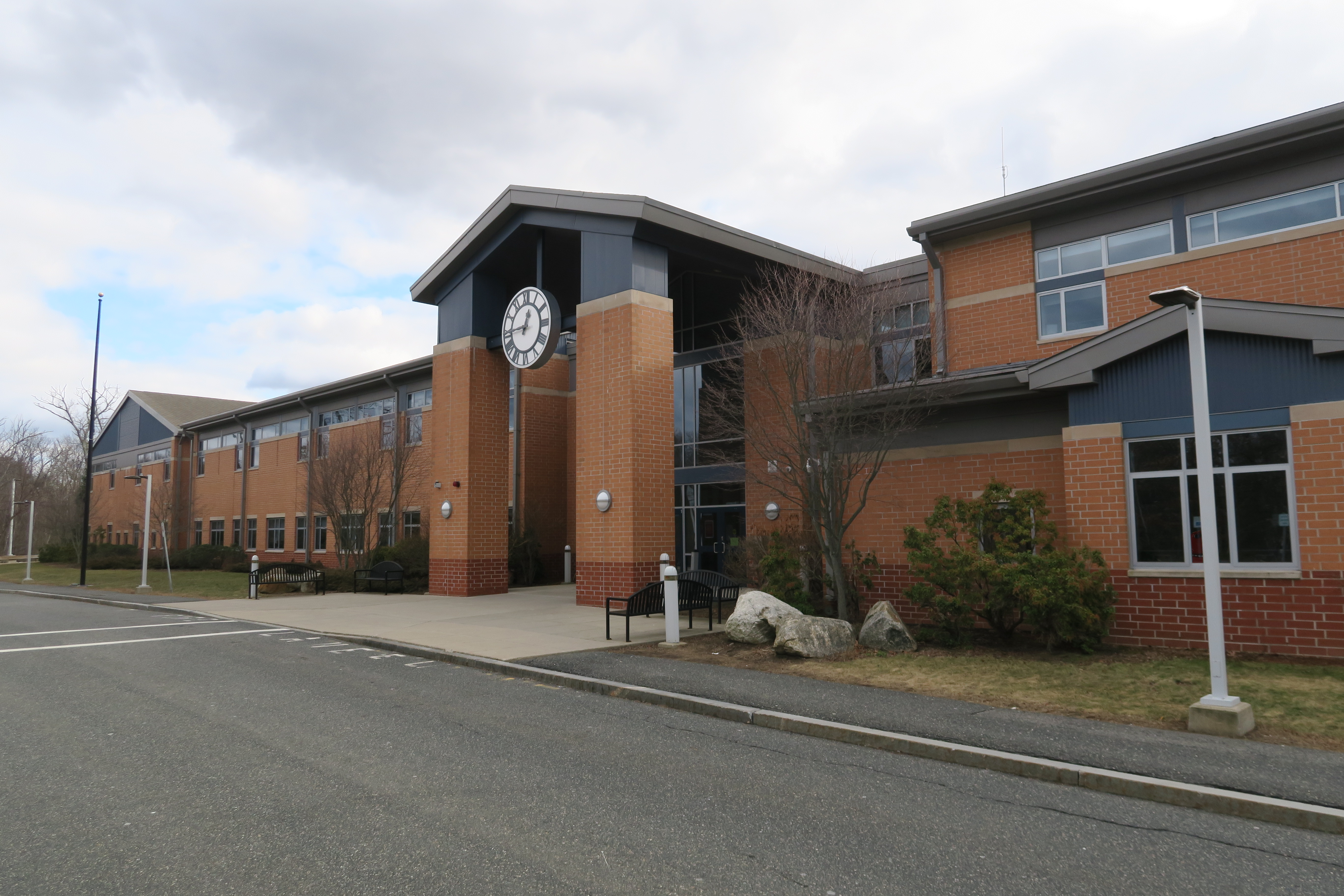
- View of Ashland High School in 2017.

Location
- 65 East Union Street; Ashland, Massachusetts 01721; United States; 42.2645°N 71.4447°W

Information
- School type: Public high school
- Motto: "Semper Superare " (Latin) ("Always Prevails")
- Superintendent: Jim Adams
- Dean: Kelli Meyer; Carolyn Lee
- Principal: Kate Altman; Erin Lachapelle; Peter Regan; Kelley St. Coeur
- Teaching staff: 63.1
- Grades: 9-12
- Enrollment: 884 (2024-2025)
- Student to teacher ratio: 14.0
- Colors: Blue, White, and Red
- Athletics: Tri-Valley League
- Team name: Clockers
- Rival: Hopkinton High School
- Accreditation: NEASC
- Website: Official website

Ashland High School is a public high school in Ashland, Massachusetts.

== History ==
Established in the nineteenth century, Ashland High School is home to the Clockers. Ashland High athletic teams have competed within the Tri-Valley League since the early 1970s when they left the Dual County League. A new school building opened in 2005. In 2009, the school had probable cases of the swine flu pandemic. On September 21, 2020, the school hosted a first-round game of the 2020 U.S. Open Cup qualification soccer tournament.

== Demographics ==
According to Massachusetts Department of Elementary and Secondary Education annual statistics, for the 2025–2026 academic year, the demographic enrollment distributions for race, gender and grade level at Ashland High School (Massachusetts) are as follows:

Total number of enrolled students: 888
Total number of full-time equivalent educators: 62.6
Therefore, the student to teacher ratio for this school is 14.2:1

Enrollment by Race/Ethnicity (2025–2026)
Race	Enrolled Pupils*	% of District
African American	27	3.0%
Asian	121	13.6%
Hispanic	183	20.6%
Native American	0	0%
White	522	58.8%
Native Hawaiian, Pacific Islander	0	0%
Multi-Race, Non-Hispanic	29	3.3%
Total	888	100%

* Approximate number of enrolled pupils is calculated based on total number of students in district, multiplied by reported percentage, and rounded to nearest whole student.

Enrollment by gender (2025–2026)
Gender	Enrolled pupils	Percentage
Female	448	50.45%
Male	437	49.21%
Non-binary	3	0.34%
Total	888	100%

Enrollment by Grade
Grade	Pupils Enrolled	Percentage
9	219	24.66%
10	227	25.56%
11	217	24.44%
12	225	25.34%
SP*	0	0%
Total	888	100%

* SP = Special Education Beyond Grade 12

== Notable alumni ==
- Dave Blass (1986), production designer
- Douglas R. Green (1973), biologist
- Dick Muri (1971), politician
- Carly Muscaro (born 1995), American middle-distance runner

== See also ==
- List of high schools in Massachusetts
