= Hopkinton High School (Massachusetts) =

Coordinates: 42°13′10.34″N 71°31′10.23″W

- 90 Hayden Rowe Street; Hopkinton, Massachusetts 01748; United States

Information
- Type: Public
- Established: 1964
- Superintendent: Evan Bishop
- Principal: Amy L. Davenport
- Teaching staff: 88.2 (FTE)
- Grades: 9-12
- Enrollment: 1,267 (2024–2025)
- Student to teacher ratio: 14.4
- Campus type: Suburban
- Colors: Green, White, and Orange
- Athletics: Tri-Valley League
- Mascot: Hillers
- Rival: Ashland High School
- Accreditation: NEASC
- Newspaper: HHS Press
- Website: Hopkinton High School

Hopkinton High School is a public, co-educational secondary school located in Hopkinton, Massachusetts.

== Demographics ==
According to Massachusetts Department of Elementary and Secondary Education annual statistics, for the 2024–2025 academic year, the demographic enrollment distributions for race, gender and grade level at Hopkinton High School (Massachusetts) are as follows:

Total number of enrolled students: 1,267
Total number of full-time equivalent educators: 88.2
Therefore, the student to teacher ratio for this school is 14.4:1

Enrollment by Race/Ethnicity (2024–2025)
Race	Enrolled Pupils*	% of District
African American	10	0.8%
Asian	336	26.5%
Hispanic	68	5.4%
Native American	4	0.3%
White	792	62.5%
Native Hawaiian, Pacific Islander	0	0%
Multi-Race, Non-Hispanic	57	4.5%
Total	1,267	100%

* Approximate number of enrolled pupils is calculated based on total number of students in district, multiplied by reported percentage, and rounded to nearest whole student.

Enrollment by gender (2024–2025)
Gender	Enrolled pupils	Percentage
Female	627	49.49%
Male	637	50.28%
Non-binary	3	0.24%
Total	1,267	100%

Enrollment by Grade
Grade	Pupils Enrolled	Percentage
9	311	24.55%
10	310	24.47%
11	317	25.02%
12	325	25.65%
SP*	4	0.32%
Total	1,267	100%

* SP = Special Education Beyond Grade 12

== Athletics ==
Hopkinton sports teams participate in the Massachusetts Interscholastic Athletic Association.

== Notable alumni ==
- Edward L. Hearn (1865-1945), fifth Supreme Knight of the Knights of Columbus
- Keegan Bradley (b. 1986), American professional golfer
- Jon Curran (b. 1987), American professional golfer
- Sasha Sloan (b. 1995), American singer songwriter
- Jane Welzel (1955-2014), pioneering long-distance runner
