= Westwood High School (Massachusetts) =

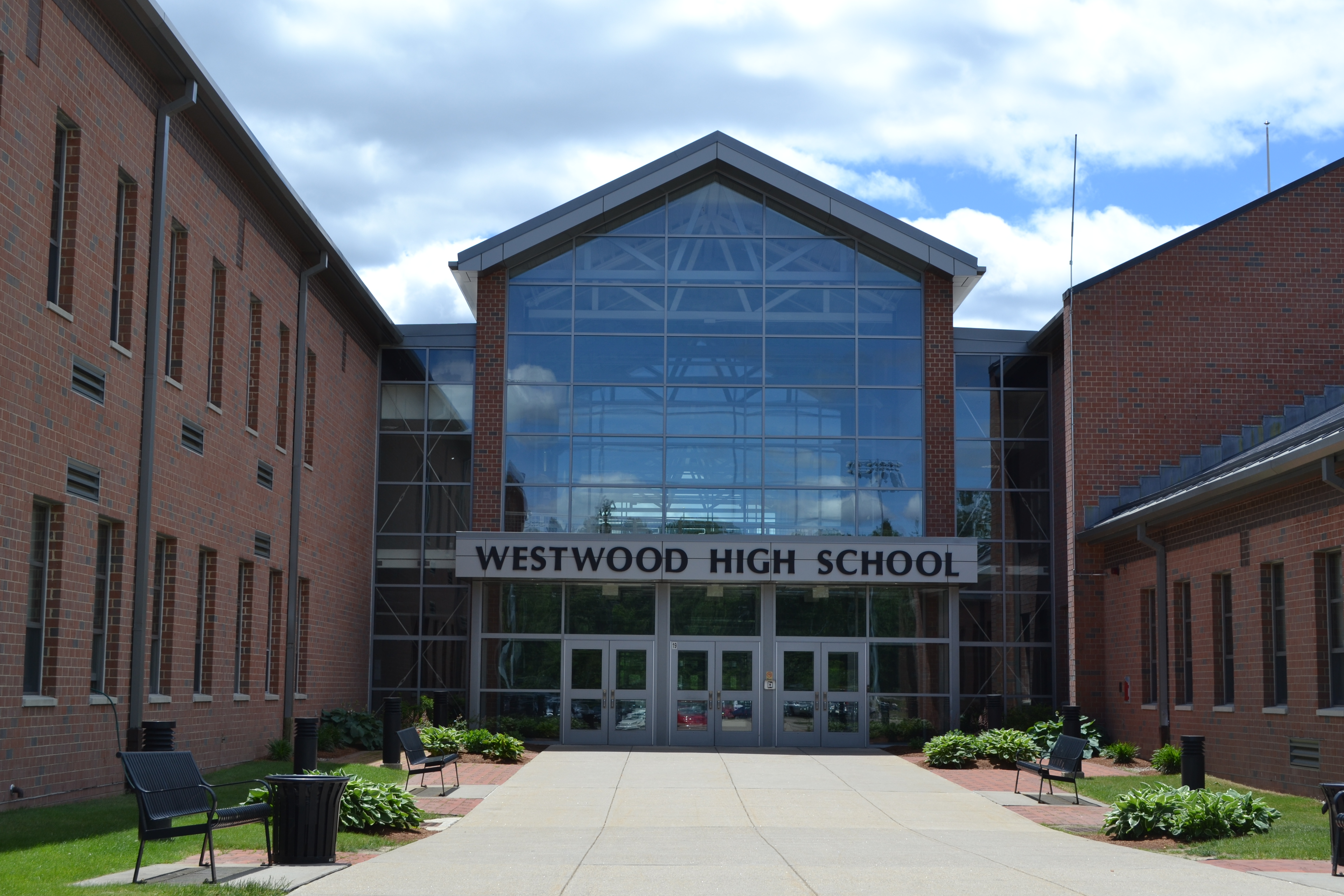

Location
- 200 Nahatan Street; Westwood, Massachusetts 02090; United States; 42°13′0.7″N 71°13′1.0″W

Information
- Other name: WHS
- Type: Public high school
- School district: Westwood Public Schools
- NCES School ID: 251281002100
- Dean: Katherine Clifford
- Principal: Dr. John Murray
- Teaching staff: 95 (on an FTE basis)
- Grades: 9–12
- Enrollment: 889 (2023–2024)
- Student to teacher ratio: 9.35
- Campus size: 33 acres
- Campus type: Suburb
- Colors: Forest green and white
- Athletics conference: Tri-Valley League
- Mascot: Wolverine
- Nickname: Wolverines
- Website: www.westwood.k12.ma.us/westwood-high-school

Westwood High School (WHS) is a public high school in Westwood, Massachusetts, United States. Rebuilt in 2005, it is part of the Westwood Public Schools district. In 2019, it was ranked as the #14 best best public high school in Boston by Boston Magazine. The current Principal is John Murray, the Assistant Principal is Aishleen Marcus, and the Dean of Students is Katherine Clifford.

== Athletics ==
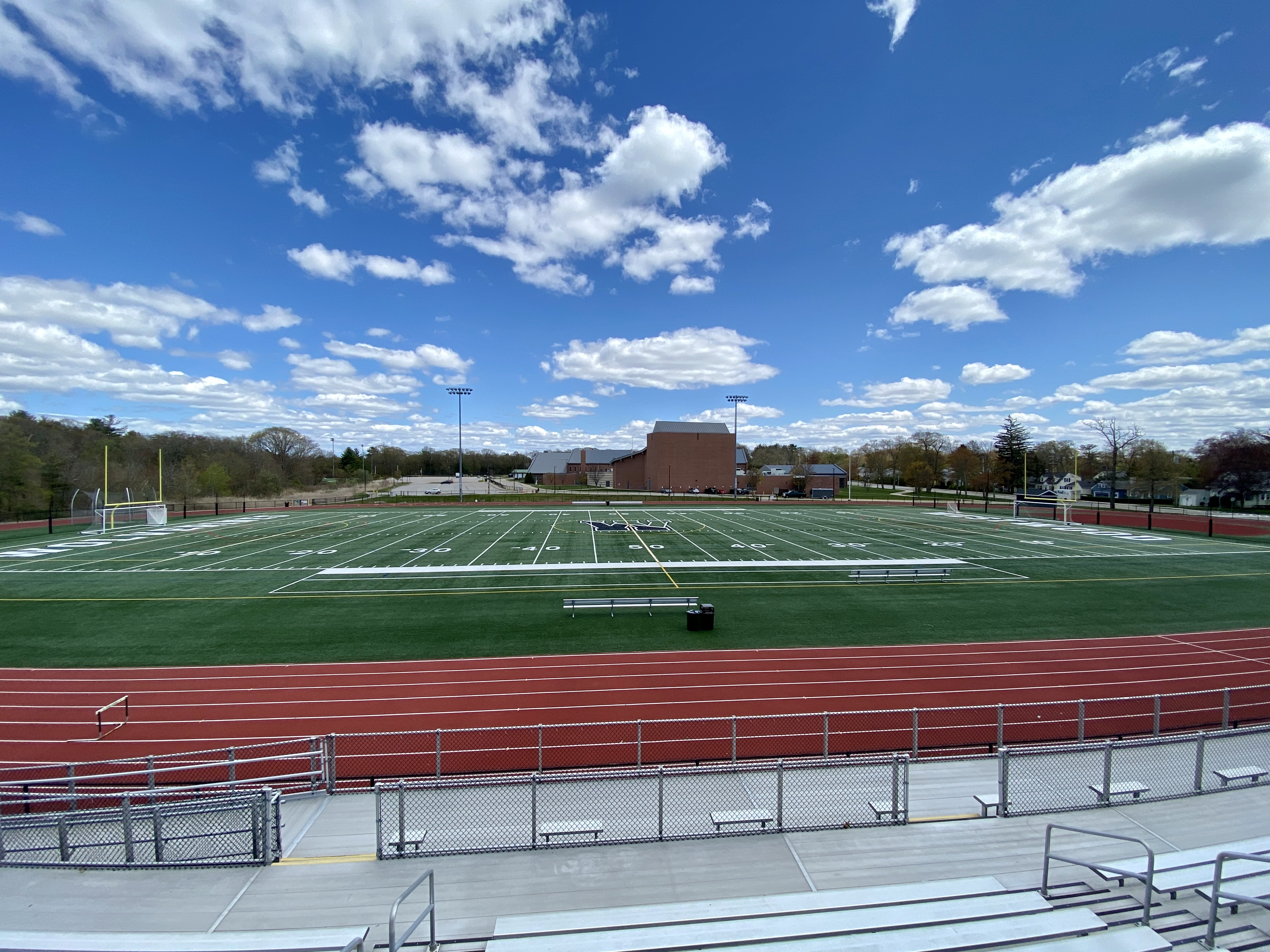
Westwood High School athletic field

Westwood High School's mascot is the wolverine and competes in the Tri-Valley League (TVL).

== Notable alumni ==
- Jackie MacMullan, freelance newspaper sportswriter
- Davis Wolfgang Hawke, American fraudster and neo-Nazi
