= Norton High School (Massachusetts) =

Location
- 66 West Main Street; Norton, Massachusetts 02766; United States; 41°57′45″N 71°11′31″W

Information
- Type: Public; Open enrollment
- School district: Norton Public Schools
- NCES School ID: 250900001451
- Principal: T.J. Flanagan
- Faculty: 60.53 (on FTE basis)
- Grades: 9–12
- Enrollment: 685 (2023-24)
- Student to teacher ratio: 11.20
- Colors: Purple and white
- Athletics conference: Tri-Valley League
- Mascot: Lancer
- Website: Norton High School

Norton High School is Norton, Massachusetts' only public high school. Built in 1971, it underwent renovations that began in June 2011 and were completed in 2014.

== Location ==
Norton High School is located near the center of town at 66 West Main St. (Rt. 123).

== Renovations ==
The renovations completed in 2014 represent the first changes to the building since it was built in 1971. The building itself needed facility upgrades and expanded classroom space to meet current state standards. This renovation cost the town approximately $34 million.
