= Massachusetts Comprehensive Assessment System =

Standards-based assessment

The Massachusetts Comprehensive Assessment system, commonly abbreviated as MCAS /ˈɛmkæs/, is Massachusetts's statewide standards-based assessment program developed in 1993 in response to the Massachusetts Education Reform Act of the same year. State and federal law mandates that all students who are enrolled in the tested grades and who are educated with Massachusetts public funds participate in MCAS testing.

If necessary, students are given multiple opportunities to take the test to maximize the chance that said student will pass the exam. In 2024, a ballot question was passed that repealed the requirement of passing the MCAS to graduate high school.

== Grade levels ==
Students take different tests according to their grade level.

MCAS tests by grade level
| Grade | Subject | | | |
| Grade | ELA ^{a} | Math | Science | Civics |
|---|---|---|---|---|
| 3 | Yes | Yes | No | No |
| 4 | Yes | Yes | No | No |
| 5 | Yes | Yes | Yes | No |
| 6 | Yes | Yes | No | No |
| 7 | Yes | Yes | No | No |
| 8 | Yes | Yes | Yes | Yes |
| 9 | No | No | Sometimes ^{b} | No |
| 10 | Yes | Yes | Sometimes ^{b} | No |

^a English language arts

^b The High School Science tests in biology and introductory physics are usually taken in either grades 9 or 10.

An Educational Proficiency Plan (EPP) must be developed for the subject matter area(s) in English Language Arts and mathematics in which students did not meet or exceed a scaled score of 240.

10th graders who score at the Advanced performance level on one of the three high school state assessment tests in ELA, Mathematics, or STE (Biology, Chemistry, Introductory Physics, or Technology/Engineering); and score at the Proficient level or higher on the remaining two high school state assessment tests; and have combined scores from the three tests that place them in the top 25 percent of students in the graduating class in their district are eligible for the John and Abigail Adams Scholarship. Recipients receive a tuition waiver (not including fees) to attend state colleges and universities in Massachusetts. The waiver is in effect for 6 years.

== Contents ==
The MCAS test is accessible via a login (usually iTester, formerly TestNav). The test is centered around a subject (English, Mathematics, and so on).

The test itself will contain a set amount of questions, and will have different resources provided within the test, depending on the subject. In an English standardized test, there will usually be multiple passages, and a few open response questions. There is also an answer eliminator for multiple-choice questions. In a mathematics-based test, there may be a calculator section where a digital calculator is provided to help determine the answer to a question in the section, such as a conversion. A ruler/protractor is usually provided for measuring. All tests should contain a notepad, where students can type. However, the notes may vanish when switching to another question, which is an inconvenience that has not been fixed. A bookmark tool is also available in the tests, which allows you to move on from the question, and come back to it later.

In the early 2020s, a new version of the science-based test replaced the existing ones. The newer models of these science tests are interactive, and have significantly more depth than any of the other tests. Students taking the modern science MCAS test will be put into a scenario with a question centered around said situation. By following instructions, students can find the solution to the questions with time. Some questions are still simply about reading a question/analyzing an image, and answering the question(s) that follow.

== Criticism ==
The MCAS has been criticized for being too narrow in nature and for pressuring teachers into restricting the curriculum to material covered by the tests. It has been met with opposition from former mayor Scott W. Lang of New Bedford, who called it "completely unsustainable" and "impractical". He claimed that the MCAS was causing students to drop out of high school, and expressed dissatisfaction with the fact that public high school students must pass the MCAS to graduate. Charles Gobron, former superintendent of the Northborough - Southborough Regional School District, claimed that the standards set by the MCAS were "unfair", and that the minimum threshold for proficiency on the tests was being raised each year, "making it look like schools are doing worse than they really are." The MCAS has also faced opposition from public school teachers. Some, such as Joan Bonsignore of Easthampton High School, claim that the tests do not accurately demonstrate the skills of students, and that they cause anxiety among the students.

Other institutions and individuals support the MCAS. For example, former Democratic State Senator Tom Birmingham, co-author of the 1993 law that created MCAS, staunchly supported it in subsequent decades as "a central ingredient in the historic rise of public education in Massachusetts that preceded the current decline."

The University of Massachusetts Donahue Institute, a research arm of the University President's Office, wrote in 2001 that the MCAS do not measure school or district performance because 84% of the variation in the scores across schools and districts is due to socioeconomic factors. In other words, as the Donahue Institute reported, "One of the consistent findings of this research is that demography explains most of the variation in test scores from district to district. Results from this year's research are similar to results from last year's work: about 84% of the variation in test results (scores for all of the test-taking students for the nine MCAS tests combined) is explained by demography. That is why Weston and Wayland have high MCAS scores and why Holyoke and Brockton have low MCAS scores. Thus, though demography is not destiny, it sets a strong tendency." In the end, wrote the Donahue Report, the MCAS scores tell more about a district's real estate values than the quality of its schools."

== 2024 Ballot Question 2 ==
Massachusetts Question 2, a ballot initiative passed in 2024, repealed the requirement for students to pass the Massachusetts Comprehensive Assessment System (MCAS) to receive a high school diploma. While the MCAS will continue to be administered annually from grades 3 through 10 as an academic benchmark, the initiative removes the formal graduation requirement tied to passing the test. Question 2 was one of several recent policy actions aimed at reducing the stakes of standardized testing in the state, alongside the legislative THRIVE Act, which proposed similar reforms but with a broader scope.

The proposal sparked considerable debate between proponents and opponents. The Massachusetts Teachers Association (MTA), the primary organization advocating for Question 2, argued that requiring students to pass the MCAS as a graduation prerequisite unfairly burdened students and emphasized standardized testing at the expense of other forms of learning. The MTA and its coalition of labor and progressive organizations, including the American Federation of Teachers and the National Education Association, launched extensive grassroots efforts to gather the necessary signatures and mobilize voters. They framed Question 2 as a step toward a more equitable education system, reflecting longstanding opposition to high-stakes standardized testing.

On the other side, opponents organized under the "Protect Our Kids' Future" committee, chaired by John Schneider, included a coalition of business associations, 12 Chambers of Commerce, various state legislators, and Governor Maura Healey's administration. This group argued that the MCAS provides a critical measure of educational standards that helps ensure accountability and preparedness among graduates. Supported by substantial financial contributions from figures such as Michael Bloomberg, who donated $2.5 million, the opposition's strategy focused on procedural challenges and a robust media campaign. They filed legal complaints challenging the language of the ballot initiative, asserting that it misrepresented the policy change by suggesting the elimination of all state graduation assessment requirements, not just MCAS.

The debate over Question 2 highlighted contrasting approaches to education reform: one led by labor and grassroots organizations pushing for reduced emphasis on standardized testing, and another backed by business interests prioritizing metrics of accountability. The outcome of this initiative may influence education policies in Massachusetts and serve as a case study for other states considering similar reforms.

== See also ==
- List of primary and secondary school tests
- List of standardized tests in the United States
- Massachusetts Department of Elementary and Secondary Education
- Concept inventory
- School leaving qualifications
- New England Association of Schools and Colleges (NEASC)
