= Colonial Athletic League =

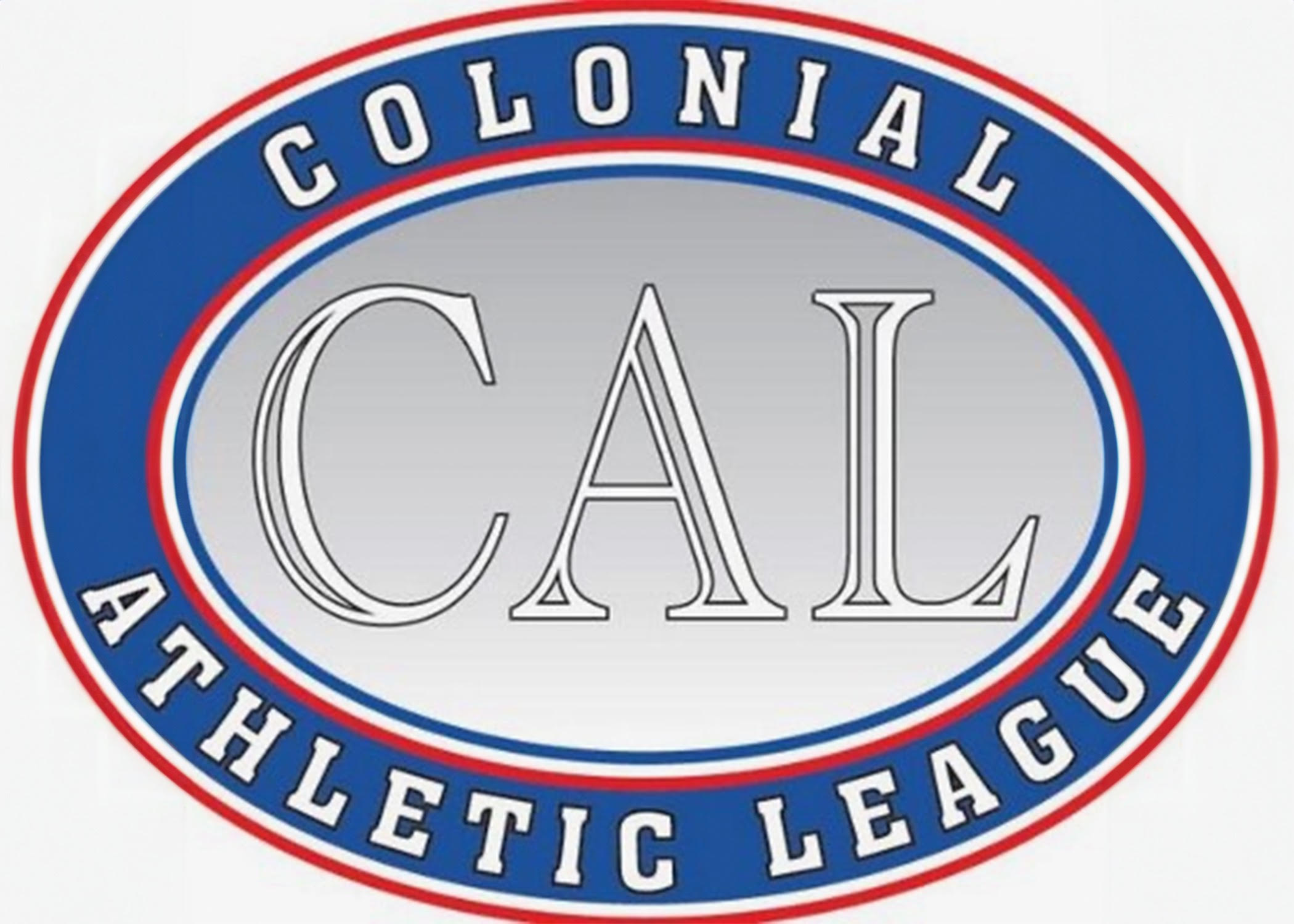
- Conference: Massachusetts Interscholastic Athletic Association
- Founded: 1976
- Folded: 2025

The Colonial Athletic League was a high school athletic conference located in District 2 of the Massachusetts Interscholastic Athletic Association. The league was formed in 1976 by a handful of vocational schools in central Massachusetts, and grew to nine vocational and charter schools across the Worcester and Middlesex Counties.

The league would fold in 2025 after merging with the Central Massachusetts Conference, Dual Valley Conference, Inter-High League, and the Southern Worcester County League to form the Central Massachusetts Athletic Conference.

== History ==
Colonial Athletic League
Locations of the former CAL schools. Schools that left before the league folded in yellow, schools that were in the league when it folded in blue.

The Colonial was formed in 1976 by schools Assabet Valley, Bay Path, Keefe Tech, Monty Tech, and Nashoba Valley. The creation of the conference was a way for Vocational Schools in Central Massachusetts to play each other in their own league.

In 1977, the league accepted their first new member in Worcester Tech (then Worcester Voke) who was already member of the Inter-High League. They stayed a part of the Inter-High while in the Colonial therefore allowing them to compete for two league titles. They did this up until at least 2011, where they became full members of the Colonial. In 1979, Tri-County RVT joined having been founded only two years prior. It was a short stint, however, and in 1984, Tri-County departed for the Mayflower League "to promote their athletics".

In 1979, the predominantly female Fanning Trade School joined the league, competing only in women's sports. A lot of controversy followed some of the teams who were required by MIAA to allow the few boys who wanted to play sports to play on girls' teams.

Fanning Trade only stuck around until the 1990-91 school year, as they would merge with Worcester Tech in the following year. New faces joined in the early 90's, those being Minuteman (who would straddle both the Colonial and Commonwealth leagues for around a decade, before becoming a full time Commonwealth member), and the first non-vocational school, Murdock. Murdock would end up leaving for the more prestigious Mid-Wach around 1995 to join other public schools. During the same time, Nashoba Valley Tech also left, heading to the Commonwealth Conference. Replacing them was Blackstone Valley Tech, who had been a part of the Dual Valley Conference since its inception.

During the 2000-01 school year, Hudson Catholic left the Catholic Suburban League for the Colonial; this was due to certain schools dominating the league and travel time between schools being too great. They would stay a part of the conference until they closed in 2009.

As the 2010s rolled around, Charter Schools began joining the league. Parker Charter was the first, around 2010, and Abby Kelley Foster and AMSA would jump from the Worcester County Athletic Conference in 2015. The league did not have any further changes until its ending in 2025.

== Former Members ==
School	Location	Mascot	Colors	Year Founded	Year Left	Current Conference
Abby Kelley Foster Charter Public School	Worcester, Massachusetts	Bears	Maroon & Gold	1998	2025	Central Massachusetts Athletic Conference
Advanced Math and Science Academy Charter School	Marlborough, Massachusetts	Eagles	Navy Blue, Orange, & White	2005	2025	Central Massachusetts Athletic Conference
Assabet Valley Regional Technical High School	Marlborough, Massachusetts	Aztecs	Blue & Gold	1973	2025	Central Massachusetts Athletic Conference
Bay Path Regional Vocational Technical High School	Charlton, Massachusetts	Minutemen	Purple & Gold	1972	2025	Central Massachusetts Athletic Conference
Blackstone Valley Regional Vocational Technical High School	Upton, Massachusetts	Beavers	Purple, Black, & White	1964	2025	Central Massachusetts Athletic Conference
Fanning Trade School	Worcester, Massachusetts				1991	N/A
Francis W. Parker Charter Essential School	Devens, Massachusetts	Panther	Green, White, & Black	1995	2025	Central Massachusetts Athletic Conference
Hudson Catholic High School	Hudson, Massachusetts	Green Wave	Green & White	1959	2009	N/A
Keefe Technical High School	Framingham, Massachusetts	Broncos	Blue & Orange	1967	2025	Central Massachusetts Athletic Conference
Minuteman Career and Technical High School	Lexington, Massachusetts	Revolution	Navy Blue, Gold, & White	1971		Commonwealth Athletic Conference
Montachusett Regional Vocational Technical School	Fitchburg, Massachusetts	Bulldogs	Purple & Gold	1965	2025	Central Massachusetts Athletic Conference
Murdock Middle/High School	Winchendon, Massachusetts	Blue Devils	Blue & White	1887	1995	Midland Wachusett League
Nashoba Valley Technical High School	Westford, Massachusetts	Vikings	Blue & White	1968		Commonwealth Athletic Conference
Tri-County Regional Vocational Technical High School	Franklin, Massachusetts	Cougar	Navy Blue & Vegas Gold	1977	1984	Mayflower
Worcester Technical High School	Worcester, Massachusetts	Eagles	Royal Blue, Silver, & White	1909	2025	Central Massachusetts Athletic Conference

== State championships ==
List of state championships won by teams while a part of the league

=== Football ===
Note: From 1972 to 2012, football state championships were separated by region, so there would be multiple champions from each division. From 1972 to 1977 and from 1997 to 2008, it was split between Eastern Mass and Central/Western Mass and there would be two champions in each division. From 1978 to 1996 and from 2009 to 2012 Central and Western Mass split so there would be three champions in each division. In 2013 everything was combined and therefore only allowed one state champion per division.

- Assabet - 1983 D3 Central; 2008 D3A Central/Western
- Bay Path - 2000, 2001 D3A Central/Western; 2011 D6 Central
- Blackstone Valley - 2007 D3A Central/Western; 2012 D6 Central; 2018 D7

=== Cross country ===
==== Boys ====
- Parker Charter - 2017 D2; 2021, 2023 D3

=== Fall swimming ===
==== Boys ====
- Advanced Math and Science - 2017 D2

=== Basketball ===
==== Boys ====
- Worcester Tech - 2019 D4

=== Softball ===
- Assabet - 2013 D3

=== Tennis ===
==== Girls ====
- Advanced Math and Science - 2021 D3
