= Inter-High League =

High School athletic conference

Inter High League

The Inter-High League (also known as The Worcester Inter-High League or Worcester League) was a High School athletic conference in the Massachusetts Interscholastic Athletic Association. The league was made up of eight public high schools and one vocational school throughout its existence all located in Worcester, Massachusetts.

Claremont Academy and University Park Campus School were too small to field team in most sports, and students instead participate in Co-Op teams with other schools in the league.

The league would fold in 2025 after merging with the Central Massachusetts Conference, Colonial Athletic League, Dual Valley Conference, and the Southern Worcester County League to form the Central Massachusetts Athletic Conference.

== History ==
The conference was founded circa 1936 by schools North High, South High, Worcester Classical, and Worcester Commerce. Being a league specifically catered to the public schools within the city of Worcester, not much changed until Worcester Classical and Worcester Commerce shut down in the sixties; which in turn brought in the two schools that replaced them. Burncoat High joined the year it was founded in 1964, and Doherty High did the same in 1966. Worcester Technical High School (then known as Worcester Trade) had been around longer than the league's existence, but it wasn't until around 1974 that they finally joined the Inter-High.

Only two years later, a new conference was formed called the Colonial Athletic League; a conference specifically for the vocational schools in central Massachusetts. In 1977, Worcester Tech joined the Colonial but did so without leaving the Inter High, allowing them to play league games in two conferences and compete for two league titles. Worcester Tech competed like this until at least 2011, where they became members of only the Colonial Athletic.

== Former Members ==
School	Mascot	Colors	Founded	Joined League	Left
Burncoat High School	Patriots	Green & White	1964	1964	2025
Claremont Academy					2025
Doherty Memorial High School	Highlanders	Maroon & Gold	1966	1966	2025
North High School	Polar Bears	Orange & Black	1911	1936	2025
South High Community School	Colonels	Red, Black, & White	1901	1936	2025
University Park Campus School			1997		2025
Worcester Classical				1936	1966
Worcester Commerce				1936	1966
Worcester Technical High School	Eagles	Royal Blue, Silver, & White		circa 1974	2011

== State Championships ==
This is a list of MIAA State championships won by schools while a part of the Inter-High league

=== Football ===
Source: Note: From 1972 to 2012, football state championships were separated by region, so there would be multiple champions from each division. From 1972 to 1977 and from 1997 to 2008, it was split between Eastern Mass and Central/Western Mass and there would be two champions in each division. From 1978 to 1996 and from 2009 to 2012 Central and Western Mass split so there would be three champions in each division. In 2013 everything was combined and therefore only allowed one state champion per division.

- Doherty - 1980 D1 Central; 2013 D4
- South - 1987, 1988 D2 Central; 2006 D3A Central/Western
- North - 2002, 2004 D3A Central/Western
- Burncoat - 2004 D2 Central/Western

=== Basketball ===
==== Boys ====
- North - 2023, 2024 D1

=== Indoor Track ===
==== Boys ====
- North - 1941 Class B
- South - 1938 Class B

=== Outdoor Track ===
==== Boys ====
- Worcester Commerce - 1938, 1939 Class B
