= Southern Worcester County League =

League within the Massachusetts Interscholastic Athletic Association

The Southern Worcester County League (SWCL) was a high school athletic conference in the Massachusetts Interscholastic Athletic Association. The league was formed circa 1923 and during its final year consisted of twelve public high schools in the southern part of Worcester County, Massachusetts. The league would fold in 2025 after merging with the Central Massachusetts Conference, Colonial Athletic League, Dual Valley Conference, and the Inter-High League, to form the Central Massachusetts Athletic Conference.

Southern Worcester County League
Former members of the Southern Worcester County League. Member schools during the final year (2025) in green, schools that left pre-2025 in blue.

== History ==
Early members of the league included Bartlett, Blackstone (which became Blackstone-Millville Regional in the sixties), Grafton, Holden (which became Wachusett Regional in 1954), Mary E. Wells (which would become Southbridge High in the sixties), Millbury, Northbridge, Oxford, Shrewsbury, Spencer (which would soon become David Prouty), Uxbridge, and Warren (which would become Quaboag Regional forty years later).

In 1931, Ware High School left the Twin State Conference to join the SWCL for "[a] circuit more beneficial to them" However, their stint in the league was short lived, as they had joined the new Valley Wheel League only a few years later. By the 1960's, the landscape of the league had changed drastically. Shrewsbury and Wachusett, having outgrown the other schools had left for the Central Mass League. Blackstone-Millville left in 1965 to help form the Tri-Valley League. Charlton (which became Shepherd Hill Regional not long after), Leicester, Westborough, and West Boylston had now joined, proving to be great fits due to their size and location. In 1967, longtime member Warren left to join the newly formed Quaboag League, and Charlton followed a year later.

A new league was formed out of the SWCL in 1966 called the Border Conference, the name coming from the fact that the schools in the conference were on or near the Connecticut border. The SWCL schools that became a part of this new league were Bartlett, David Prouty, Tantasqua, and Southbridge, Auburn would join a couple years later. Westborough returned to the Midland League in 1974, now that the league had re-formed; David Prouty replaced them after leaving the Border Conference. After West Boylston left in 1992, the SWCL grabbed Auburn from the Border Conference. Thus began the beginning of the end for the Border Conference, now that longtime member Auburn was returning to the SWCL for the 1993 season. In 1997, the rest of the conference was absorbed by the SWCL, giving them schools Bartlett, Shepherd Hill, Southbridge, Tantasqua, and Quaboag. North Brookfield was the only member of the Border Conference not to join the SWCL, instead going to the Dual Valley Conference.

Finally in 2013, Shepherd Hill once again left the league, this time going to the Midland Wachusett League, looking for better competition as they had outgrown their fellow members. This would be the last change in lineup before the conference ended in 2025.

== Former members ==
School	Location	Mascot	Colors	Current Conference
Auburn High School	Auburn, Massachusetts	Rockets	Blue & White	Central Massachusetts Athletic Conference
Bartlett High School	Webster, Massachusetts	Indians	Green & White	Central Massachusetts Athletic Conference
Blackstone-Millville Regional High School	Blackstone, Massachusetts	Chargers	Purple & Gold	Central Massachusetts Athletic Conference
David Prouty High School	Spencer, Massachusetts	Panthers	Black & Orange	Central Massachusetts Athletic Conference
Grafton High School	Grafton, Massachusetts	Gators	Green & White	Midland Wachusett League
Leicester High School	Leicester, Massachusetts	Wolverines		Central Massachusetts Athletic Conference
Millbury High School	Millbury, Massachusetts	Woolies	Maroon & White	Central Massachusetts Athletic Conference
Northbridge High School	Northbridge, Massachusetts	Rams	Maroon & White	Central Massachusetts Athletic Conference
Oxford High School	Oxford, Massachusetts	Pirates	Orange & Black	Central Massachusetts Athletic Conference
Quaboag Regional Middle High School	Warren, Massachusetts	Cougars	Maroon & White	Central Massachusetts Athletic Conference
Shepherd Hill Regional High School	Dudley, Massachusetts	Rams	Maroon & Gold	Midland Wachusett League
Shrewsbury High School	Shrewsbury, Massachusetts	Colonials	Navy Blue & Vegas Gold	Midland Wachusett League
Southbridge High School	Southbridge, Massachusetts	Pioneers	Red & White	Central Massachusetts Athletic Conference
Tantasqua Regional High School	Sturbridge, Massachusetts	Warriors	Green & Gold	Central Massachusetts Athletic Conference
Uxbridge High School	Uxbridge, Massachusetts	Spartans	Black & Orange	Central Massachusetts Athletic Conference
Wachusett Regional High School	Holden, Massachusetts	Mountaineers	Green & White	Midland Wachusett League
Ware High School	Ware, Massachusetts	Indians	Green & White	Pioneer Valley Interscholastic Athletic Conference
Westborough High School	Westborough, Massachusetts	Rangers	Cardinal & Navy Blue	Midland Wachusett League
West Boylston Middle/High School	West Boylston, Massachusetts	Lions	Blue & White	Midland Wachusett League

== State Championships ==
This is a list of MIAA State championships won by schools while a part of the Southern Worcester County League

=== Football ===
Note: From 1972 to 2012, football state championships were separated by region, so there would be multiple champions from each division. From 1972 to 1977 and from 1997 to 2008, it was split between Eastern Mass and Central/Western Mass and there would be two champions in each division. From 1978 to 1996 and from 2009 to 2012 Central and Western Mass split so there would be three champions in each division. In 2013 everything was combined and therefore only allowed one state champion per division.

- Northbridge - 1974, 1997, 1998 D3 Central/Western; 1987, 1989 D3 Central; 2001, 2002 D2 Central/Western; 2007 D2A Central/Western; 2011 D4 Central; 2015 D5
- Grafton - 1984, 1985, 1986 D3 Central; 2012 D4 Central
- West Boylston - 1988 D3 Central
- Uxbridge - 1991, 1992 D3 Central; 2023, 2024 D7
- Millbury - 1993 D3 Central; 2003 D2A Central/Western
- Oxford - 1997 D3A Central/Western
- Liecester - 2000, 2004 D2A Central/Western; 2011 D5 Central
- Shepherd Hill - 2007 D2 Central/Western
- Auburn - 2008 D2A Central/Western; 2009, 2010, D2 Central; 2011, 2012 D3 Central
- Tantasqua - 2008 D2 Central/Western
- David Prouty - 2009 D2 Central

=== Field hockey ===
- Quaboag - 1998, 2007 D2
- Uxbridge - 2021-2024 D4

=== Soccer ===
==== Boys ====
- David Prouty - 1998 D2
- Grafton - 2003 D3
- Bartlett - 2006 D3

==== Girls ====
- Grafton - 1996 D3
- Shepherd Hill - 1997 D2
- Auburn - 2011 D2
- Millbury - 2015, 2016 D3; 2019 D4

=== Basketball ===
==== Boys ====
- Tantasqua - 2007 D2

==== Girls ====
- Oxford - 1992, 1993 D2
- David Prouty - 1999 D2
- Quaboag - 2004, 2006 D3

=== Ice hockey ===
==== Boys ====
- Auburn - 1968
- Grafton - 2017 D3A (Co-Champs with Blackstone Valley Tech)
- Northbridge - 2019 D3A

=== Baseball ===
- Grafton - 1976 D2
- West Boylston 1977 D3
- Millbury - 1984 D3
- Oxford - 1986 D3
- Auburn -1998, 2009 D2; 2017, 2018 D3
- Northbridge - 1999 D3; 2010 D2

=== Softball ===
- Grafton - 2012, 2013, 2017 D2
