= Vinnie Yablonski =

American football player (1923–2008)

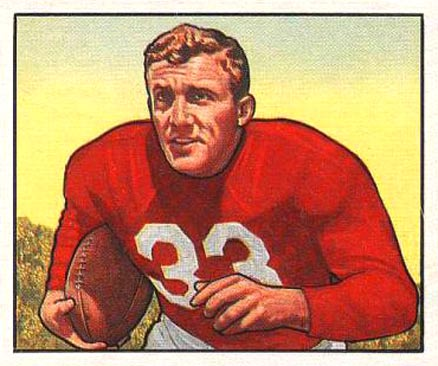
- Yablonski on a 1950 Bowman football card

No. 33
- Positions: Fullback, linebacker

Personal information
- Born: March 4, 1923; Worcester, Massachusetts, U.S.
- Died: March 1, 2008 (aged 84); Naperville, Illinois, U.S.
- Listed height: 5 ft 8 in (1.73 m)
- Listed weight: 195 lb (88 kg)

Career information
- High school: Classical (Worcester)
- College: Fordham (1941–1942); Columbia (1946–1947)
- NFL draft: 1946: 12th round, 101st overall pick

Career history
- Chicago Cardinals (1948–1951)

Career NFL statistics
- Rushing yards: 460
- Rushing average: 3.7
- Receptions: 15
- Receiving yards: 127
- Total touchdowns: 1
- Stats at Pro Football Reference

Ventan Constantine Yablonski (March 4, 1923 – March 1, 2008) was an American professional football fullback who played four seasons with the Chicago Cardinals of the National Football League (NFL). He played college football at Fordham University and Columbia University.

== Early life and college ==
Ventan Constantine Yablonski was born on March 4, 1923, in Worcester, Massachusetts. He attended Worcester Classical High School in Worcester.

Yablonski was a member of the Fordham Rams of Fordham University from 1941 to 1942 and a letterman in 1942. He then served in the United States Army Air Forces during World War II. After the war, he was a two-year letterman for the Columbia Lions of Columbia University from 1946 to 1947.

== Professional career ==
Yablonski was selected by the Chicago Cardinals in the 12th round, with the 101st overall pick, of the 1946 NFL draft and by the Buffalo Bills in the 18th round, with the 134th overall pick, of the 1947 AAFC draft. He signed with the Cardinals on January 24, 1948. He played in all 12 games, starting two, for the Cardinals during the 1948 season, totaling 48 carries for 233 yards, one reception for 13 yards, and one of four field goals. Yablonski also appeared in the 1948 NFL Championship Game, 7–0 loss to the Philadelphia Eagles. He played in all 12 games, starting two, for the second consecutive year in 1949, recording 32 rushing attempts for 97 yards, six catches for 35 yards, five of six field goals, and one of one extra points. He appeared in all 12 games for the third consecutive season in 1950, accumulating 30 rushes for 110 yards and one touchdown, seven receptions for 71 yards, two of three field goals, and seven of seven extra points. Yablonski started the first four games of the 1951 season for the Cardinals, totaling 14 carries for 20 yards, one reception for eight yards, two of five field goals, and eight of eight extra points. He was released by Chicago on October 24, 1951.

== Personal life ==
Yablonski's brother Joe Yablonski played college football at Holy Cross, and professionally for the Providence Steamroller of the American Association and the Boston Bears of the American Football League. Vinnie died on March 1, 2008, in Naperville, Illinois.
