= Assabet Valley Regional Technical High School =

Public vocational-technical school in Marlborough, Massachusetts

Location
- 215 Fitchburg Street; Marlborough, Massachusetts 01752; United States; 42°22′5″N 71°33′56″W

Information
- Other name: Assabet Valley
- Type: Public school (government funded), Vocational-technical school
- Established: September 1, 1973
- Superintendent: Ernest F. Houle
- NCES School ID: 250211002257
- Principal: Patrick J. O'Rourke
- Teaching staff: 113.76 (on an FTE basis)
- Grades: 9–12
- Enrollment: 1,144 (2025–26)
- Student to teacher ratio: 9.93
- Campus: Suburban
- Colors: Blue & gold
- Athletics conference: Central Massachusetts Athletic Conference
- Mascot: Aztec
- Communities served: In-district — Marlborough, Hudson, Northborough, Southborough, Westborough, Maynard, Berlin —— Out-of-district — Boxborough, Boylston, Clinton, Leicester, Shrewsbury, Sudbury, Stow
- Website: www.assabet.org

Assabet Valley Regional Technical High School (AVRTHS) is a public Vocational-technical school in the city of Marlborough, Massachusetts, that serves grades 9–12. It accepts students from towns around the Interstate 495 (Massachusetts) corridor. Assabet also has Quinsigamond Community College NCLEX-PN on site. The school offers academic classes and 16 vocational programs to make it one of the public vocational schools in Middlesex County, Massachusetts. The 2025–26 student body is 1,144 according to the Commonwealth of Massachusetts.

== History ==
On April 15, 1966, Marlborough Mayor Frank D. Walker had appointed an eleven-member committee to investigate the need for a vocational school in the area surrounding Marlborough. The first-ever meeting of the Assabet Valley Regional Vocational District School Committee was on April 24, 1968, and the district was legally established under Massachusetts General Laws in 1969. A groundbreaking ceremony was held for the then, future Assabet Valley Regional Technical High School on April 10, 1971, construction began shortly after. Construction would wrap up in the Summer of 1973. Assabet Valley Regional Technical High School opened on September 5, 1973. It is the single school administered by the Assabet Valley Regional Vocational School District, which comprises the towns of Berlin, Hudson, Maynard, Northborough, Southborough, and Westborough, and the city of Marlborough. Each municipality elects by popular vote one member to the district's school committee.

Assabet Valley's educational mission focuses heavily on vocational instruction, although in recent years they have expanded their academic offerings as well.

In 1986, the building went under a minor renovation, replacing its roof. This renovation has no other effect, leaving the building's quality to deteriorate over the years.

From 2012 to 2015 the school undertook a $62.4-million renovation of its aging building. The Massachusetts School Building Authority provided just over fifty percent of the project cost, while the school district's municipalities covered the remainder. The building has had renovations, but never expanded out of its footprint. This renovation allows for 1200 students to be accommodated.

In April 2026, Governor Maura Healey announced that two new technical programs would be introduced into the facility, Veterinary Science and Public Safety, which would allow the school to accommodate 160 more students as the student population grows. $3.75 million dollars in funding was given to fund the addition of these programs. This was a part of the $70 million dollar state-wide Career Technical Education expansion that boosts vocational/technical education in the state of Massachusetts.

In May 2026, it was announced that the school’s aging 50-year old auditorium will be fully renovated, with accessibility updates, improvement of aging infrastructure and the modernization of theatrical technology. $350,000 was secured by State Senator Jamie Eldridge to fund the renovations.

== Curriculum ==
Assabet Valley offers 16 programs that are approved by the Department of Elementary and Secondary Education:

- Advanced Manufacturing
- Auto Collision: Repair Technology
- Automotive Technology "Auto Tech"
- Biotechnology
- Business Technologies
- Computer Programming and Web Development "CPWD"
- Cosmotology
- Culinary Arts and Hospitality Management
- Design and Visual Communications
- Electrical Wiring
- Health Technologies
- Heating, Ventilation, Air-Conditioning, Refrigeration "HVAC/R"
- House Carpentry
- Metal Fabrication and Welding
- Painting and Design Technologies
- Plumbing

Programs that are coming soon:

- Veterinary Science
- Public Safety

All programs listed above partake in SkillsUSA, as well.

== Athletics ==
The Assabet Valley Aztecs are part of the Massachusetts Interscholastic Athletic Association and participate in the Colonial Athletic League District 2. All sports are Division IIII and include a variety of free to enroll, no cut teams including:

- Cheerleading (V)
- Cross Country (V)
- Baseball (V, JV, JV2)
- Basketball (V, JV, JV2)
- Football (V, JV, JV2)
- Golf (V, JV)
- Ice Hockey (V, JV)
- Lacrosse (V, JV)
- Soccer (V, JV, JV2)
- Softball (V, JV)
- Track and Field (V)
- Volleyball (V, JV, JV2)
- Wrestling (V)

In the spring and summer of 2017 Assabet renovated its athletic facilities for the first time since their construction in 1973. The $2.4-million project included a new turf football field, new bleachers, a rubberized track, renovated baseball and softball fields, and renovated tennis and basketball courts. The school district did not assess its member municipalities for the project, instead using available funds and selling naming rights to the new athletic complex.

The most recent banner addition for the Aztecs was the 2024–25 Colonial Athletic League varsity basketball championship where the team went 18-6 with an MIAA rank of 182, and had a league record of 7-2; therefore, tying with Abby Kelley Foster Charter Public School who also had a league record of 7-2.
