= Michael Bradley (basketball) =

American basketball player (born 1979)

Personal information
- Born: April 18, 1979 (age 47) Worcester, Massachusetts, U.S.
- Listed height: 6 ft 10 in (2.08 m)
- Listed weight: 235 lb (107 kg)

Career information
- High school: Burncoat (Worcester, Massachusetts)
- College: Kentucky (1997–1999); Villanova (2000–2001)
- NBA draft: 2001: 1st round, 17th overall pick
- Drafted by: Toronto Raptors
- Playing career: 2001–2008
- Position: Power forward / center
- Number: 5, 33, 7, 31
- Coaching career: 2010–present

Career history

Playing
- 2001–2004: Toronto Raptors
- 2004: Atlanta Hawks
- 2004–2005: Orlando Magic
- 2005: Sacramento Kings
- 2005–2006: Philadelphia 76ers
- 2006–2007: Bruesa GBC
- 2007: ALBA Berlin
- 2007–2008: Žalgiris Kaunas
- 2007: CB Granada

Career highlights
- NCAA champion (1998); Consensus second-team All-American (2001); First-team All-Big East (2001); Robert V. Geasey Trophy co-winner (2001)
- Stats at NBA.com
- Stats at Basketball Reference

Michael Thomas Bradley (born April 18, 1979) is an American former professional basketball player and businessman. He is a 6 ft 10 in (2.08 m), 235 lb (107 kg), power forward/center.

== Early life ==
Bradley was born in Worcester, Massachusetts.

== Career ==
After attending Burncoat High School, he accepted a scholarship to play college basketball at the University of Kentucky. After his sophomore season at Kentucky, Bradley transferred to Villanova University where he started. That season he averaged 20.8 points per game and 9.8 rebounds per game. He received All-Big East and All-America honors in 2001. In 2005, he graduated from Villanova with a bachelor of arts degree.

=== NBA ===
Even though he had one year of college eligibility remaining, Bradley left school to go to the NBA in 2001 and was selected as the 17th pick in the 1st round of the NBA draft by the Toronto Raptors. During his rookie season, Bradley averaged 1.2 points per game and 0.9 rebounds per game. His statistics improved in 2002–03 (5 ppg and 6 rpg in 20 minutes), but in the following season was sidelined constantly with a right knee injury. He was let go by the Raptors in March 2004, and would later be signed by the Atlanta Hawks. In 2004–05 he started off with the Orlando Magic, but was traded twice during that season, to the Sacramento Kings and the Philadelphia 76ers. Played 46 games with the Sixers in 2005–06, his best in two years, mainly because of constant injuries to Chris Webber.

Bradley's final NBA game was played on April 19, 2006, in a 86–96 loss to the Charlotte Bobcats where he recorded 4 points, 2 assists and 1 rebound.

=== ACB ===
In the 2006–07 season he signed for Bruesa GBC in the Spanish ACB. After spending one season with the Spanish team, Bradley moved to Germany and signed with ALBA Berlin in August but was released in November. He did not stay unemployed for long, signing with Lithuanian power Žalgiris on November 15. However, he was limited by injuries, averaging only 7 points and 4.9 rebounds in seven games.

On March 10, 2008, Bradley signed with CB Granada of the ACB to play the rest of the season.

=== Sports representative ===
From 2008 until 2011, Bradley was an NBA and FIBA sports representative with Bradley Sports Management.

=== Coaching career ===
In 2010 Bradley was hired by the Summit Country Day School in Cincinnati, Ohio to be the coach of the Silver Knights boys varsity basketball team.

In March 2012, Bradley coached the Silver Knights to the D3 OHSAA State Championship, defeating Portsmouth High School 53–37. He finished with a 93-13 score at Summit, and never lost a home game.

Bradley now coaches and works for the NBA in Europe and the Middle East - leading camps, clinics and teaching the game of basketball to youth around the globe.

== Personal life ==
Bradley has three daughters, Taylor Rose, Kya Melat, and Shae Quinn.

== Career statistics ==
Legend
GP	Games played	GS	Games started	MPG	Minutes per game
FG%	Field goal percentage	3P%	3-point field goal percentage	FT%	Free throw percentage
RPG	Rebounds per game	APG	Assists per game	SPG	Steals per game
BPG	Blocks per game	PPG	Points per game	**Bold**	Career high

=== NBA ===
==== Regular season ====
Year	Team	GP	GS	MPG	FG%	3P%	FT%	RPG	APG	SPG	BPG	PPG
2001–02	Toronto	26	0	4.5	.520	.000	.500	0.9	0.1	0.0	0.2	1.2
2002–03	Toronto	**67**	**11**	**19.6**	.481	.167	.522	**6.1**	**1.0**	**0.2**	**0.5**	**5.0**
2003–04	Toronto	5	0	7.6	.333	.000	.500	2.2	0.2	**0.2**	0.0	0.6
2003–04	Atlanta	11	1	5.5	.500	.000	.000	1.1	0.0	**0.2**	0.0	1.1
2004–05	Orlando	8	0	6.9	.429	.000	.000	1.8	0.3	0.1	0.3	0.8
2004–05	Sacramento	8	0	6.0	.667	.000	.333	1.4	0.3	0.0	0.0	2.3
2004–05	Philadelphia	2	0	8.0	**.800**	.000	.500	1.5	0.5	0.0	0.0	4.5
2005–06	Philadelphia	46	1	8.0	.405	**.200**	**.667**	2.3	0.4	0.1	0.2	1.5
Career		173	13	11.7	.477	.143	.511	3.4	0.5	0.1	0.3	2.8

==== Playoffs ====
Year	Team	GP	GS	MPG	FG%	3P%	FT%	RPG	APG	SPG	BPG	PPG
2001–02	Toronto	1	0	3.0	.000	.000	.000	1.0	1.0	0.0	0.0	0.0

=== College ===
Year	Team	GP	GS	MPG	FG%	3P%	FT%	RPG	APG	SPG	BPG	PPG
1997–98	Kentucky	32	0	6.9	.667	.000	.514	1.7	0.5	0.2	0.5	2.4
1998–99	Kentucky	**37**	**37**	21.9	.657	.000	.455	4.9	1.0	0.8	0.8	9.8
2000–01	Villanova	31	31	**34.0**	**.692**	**.353**	**.590**	**9.8**	**2.6**	**0.9**	**1.8**	**20.8**
Career		100	68	20.9	.677	.353	.541	5.4	1.3	0.6	1.0	10.9
