= Central Massachusetts Conference =

Former athletic complex

Central Mass Conference

The Central Massachusetts Conference was a high school athletic conference located in District 2 of the Massachusetts Interscholastic Athletic Association. All of the schools in the conference during the final years of existence were Catholic Schools located in the Worcester County of Massachusetts. St. Bernard's Football and Ice Hockey teams were part of the Catholic Central League.

The current iteration of the conference was founded in 1975 with schools Fitchburg, Gardner, Holy Name, Leominster, St. Bernard's, St. John's, St. Peter's (which would become St. Peter-Marian a year later after merging with Marian High), and Wachusett. Notre Dame Academy would join a couple years later in 1977. It wasn't long until members began leaving however, Gardner being the first to go join the massive Wachusett League in the fall of 1980. The conference remained stable for the better half of the decade until 1988, when Fitchburg, Leominster and Wachusett all left for the Midland League. By now, all schools had dwindling enrollment sizes except for St. John's who was easily overpowering the others in athletics. This led to St. John's leaving for the Catholic Conference in 2021. In 2025, with the conference on its final leg, it merged with the Colonial Athletic League, Dual Valley Conference, Inter-High League, and the Southern Worcester County League to create the Central Massachusetts Athletic Conference.

== Former Members ==
School	Location	Mascot	Colors	Year Left*	Current Conference
Fitchburg High School	Fitchburg, Massachusetts	Red Raiders	Red & Gray	1989	Midland Wachusett League
Gardner High School	Gardner, Massachusetts	Wildcats	Orange & Black	1980	Midland Wachusett League
Leominster High School	Leominster, Massachusetts	Blue Devils	Blue & White	1989	Midland Wachusett League
Notre Dame Academy	Worcester, Massachusetts	Rebels	Green & Gold	2025	Central Massachusetts Athletic Conference
Saint Bernard's High School	Fitchburg, Massachusetts	Bernardians	Blue & Gold	2025	Central Massachusetts Athletic Conference
Saint John's High School	Shrewsbury, Massachusetts	Pioneers	Red & White	2021	Catholic Conference
St. Paul Diocesan Junior-Senior High School	Worcester, Massachusetts	Knights	Black & Gold	2025	Central Massachusetts Athletic Conference
Wachusett Regional High School	Holden, Massachusetts	Mountaineers	Green & White	1989	Midland Wachusett League

*All schools joined when the league founded in 1975

== State Championships ==
This is a list of MIAA state championships won by schools while a part of the Central Mass Conference

=== Football ===
Note: From 1972 to 2012, football state championships were separated by region, so there would be multiple champions from each division. From 1972 to 1977 and from 1997 to 2008, it was split between Eastern Mass and Central/Western Mass and there would be two champions in each division. From 1978 to 1996 and from 2009 to 2012 Central and Western Mass split so there would be three champions in each division. In 2013 everything was combined and therefore only allowed one state champion per division.

- St. John's - 1977, 2001, 2004 D1 Central/Western; 1985, 1988, 2001 D1 Central; 2005, 2006 D1AA Central/Western; 2017 D3
- Leominster - 1978, 1981, 1982, D1 Central
- St. Peter-Marian - 1992, 1993, 1994, 1995, 1996 D2 Central
- Holy Name - 2005, 2006 D2 Central/Western; 2008 D1A Central/Western
- St. Bernard's - 2018, 2019 D8

=== Cross Country ===
==== Boys ====
- Gardner - 1976 D1
- St. John's - 1992, 2017 D1

=== Soccer ===
==== Boys ====
- Leominster - 1978 D1
- St. John's - 1985, 2007 D1

==== Girls ====
- St. Peter-Marian - 1999 (Co-Champs with Oliver Ames High School) D2

=== Fall Golf ===
- St. John's - 2006, 2007, 2011, 2012, 2023

=== Field Hockey ===
- Notre Dame Academy - 1992, 2002, 2003, 2005 D1

=== Basketball ===
==== Boys ====
- St. Bernard's - 1988 D2
- St. John's - 2000, 2009 D1

==== Girls ====
- St. Peter-Marian - 1984 D1

=== Indoor Track ===
==== Boys ====
- Fitchburg - 1978 Class C

=== Ice Hockey ===
==== Boys ====
- St. John's - 1999, 2004 D1

=== Alpine Ski ===
==== Boys ====
- St. John's - 2007
- St. Peter-Marian - 2014

=== Baseball ===
- St. John's - 1976, 2002 D1
- St. Peter-Marian - 1977, 1987 D1

=== Softball ===
- St. Peter-Marian - 1977, 1979, 1981, 1985, 2015 D1
- Leominster - 1987 D1

=== Tennis ===
==== Boys ====
- St. John's - 1998, 1999, 2003, 2004 D1

==== Girls ====
- Notre Dame Academy - 2004-2006 D2

=== Spring Golf ===
- Notre Dame Academy - 2015, 2016
