= Worcester Public Schools =

School district in Massachusetts, United States

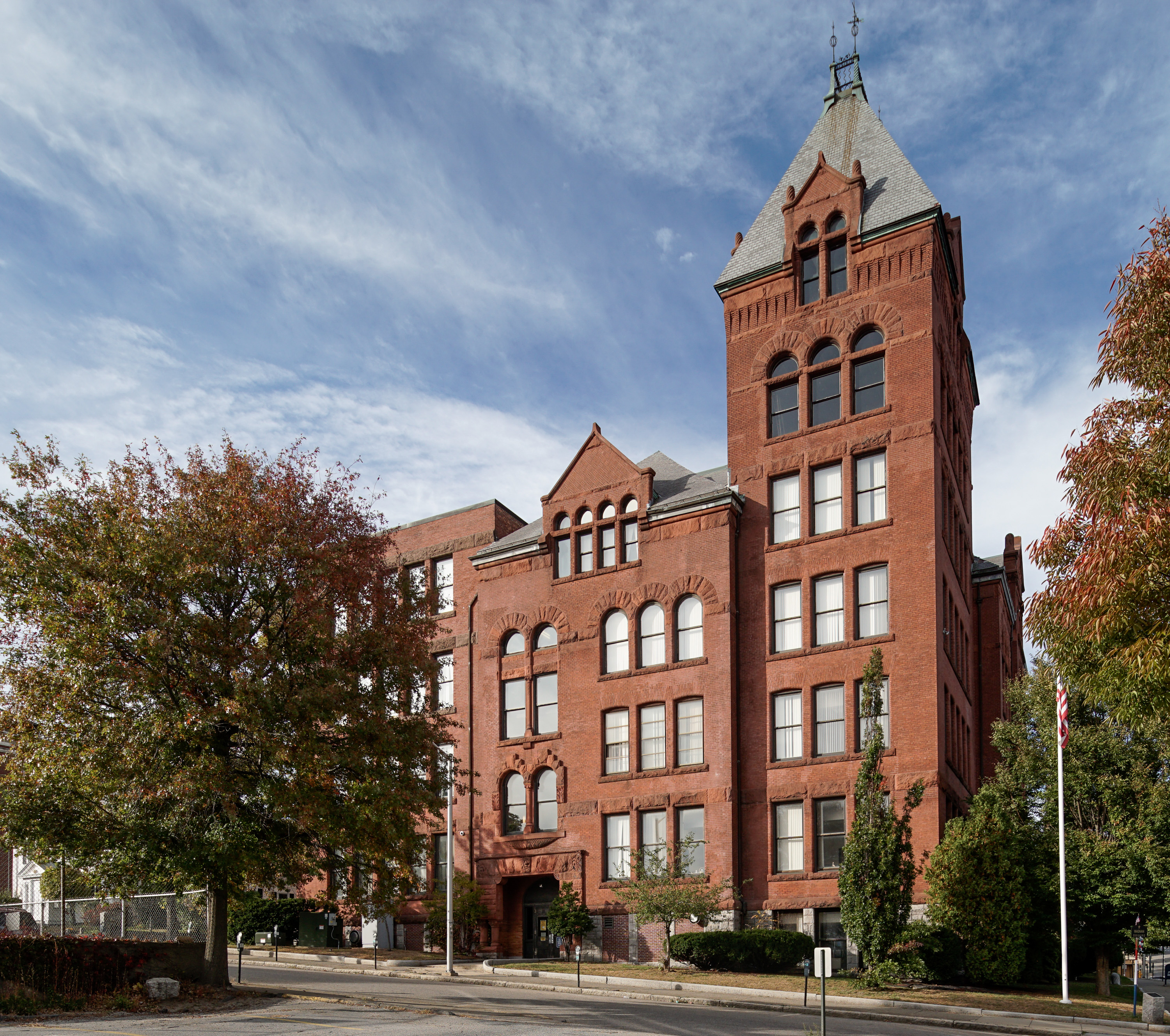
- Durkin Administration Building

Location
- 20 Irving Street, Worcester, Massachusetts 01609 United States

District information
- Type: Public; Open enrollment
- Grades: K-12th
- Superintendent: Brian E. Allen
- Schools: 45
- Budget: $401,987,529 total $14,126 per pupil (2019)

Students and staff
- Students: 28,618 (2017–18)
- Student–teacher ratio: 14 to 1

Other information
- Average SAT scores: 478 verbal 481 math 959 total (2017–2018)
- Website: Worcester Public Schools

Worcester Public Schools (WPS) is a school district serving the city of Worcester, Massachusetts, United States. It is the second-largest school district in the state behind Boston Public Schools.

== Schools ==
=== High schools ===
- Burncoat High School
- Claremont Academy
- Doherty Memorial High School
- North High School
- South High Community School
- University Park Campus School
- Worcester Technical High School

=== Middle schools ===
- Burncoat Middle School
- Forest Grove Middle School
- Dr. Arthur F. Sullivan Middle School
- Worcester East Middle School

=== Elementary schools ===
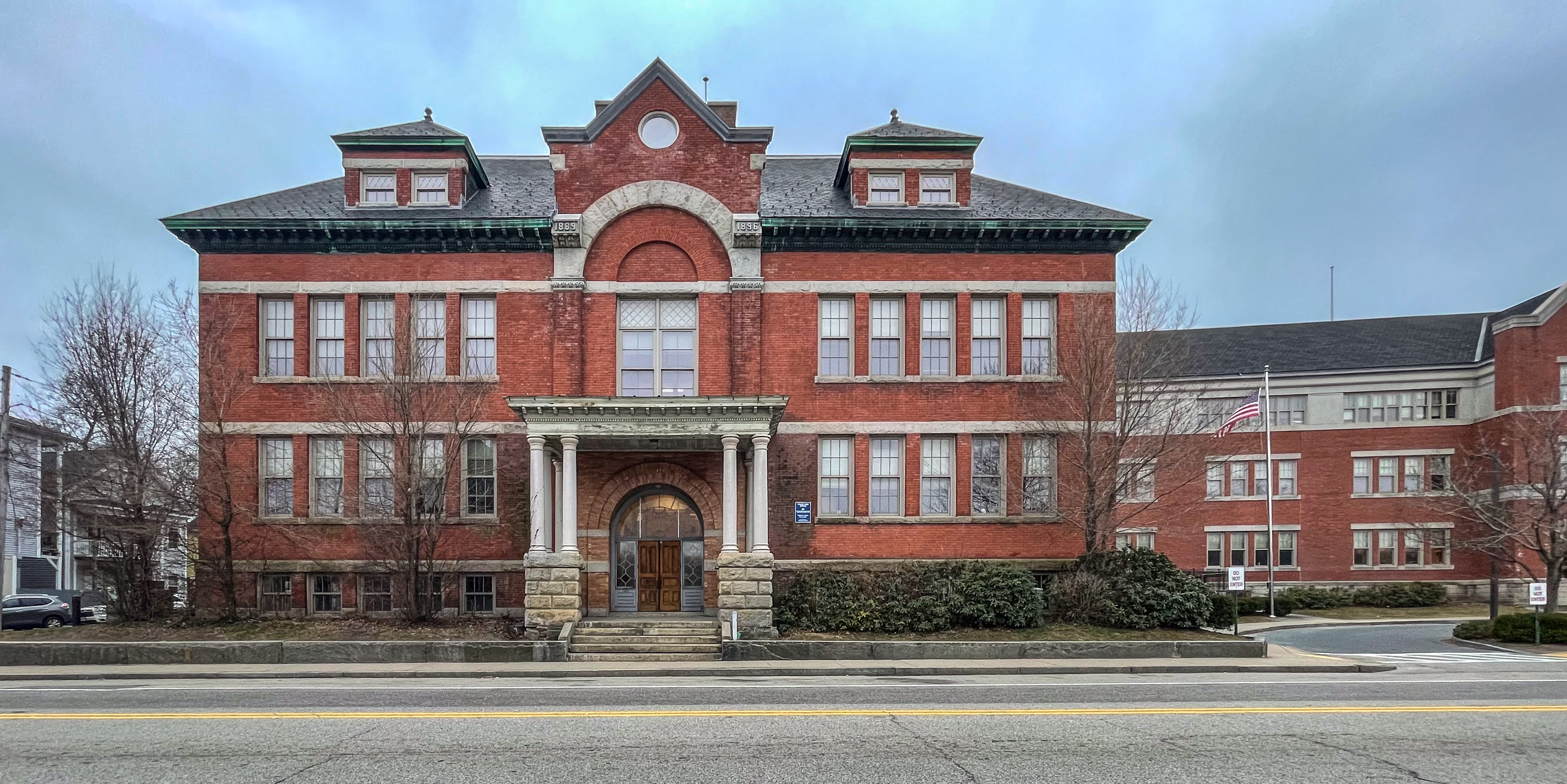
Quinsigamond elementary school

- Belmont Street Community School
- Burncoat Street Preparatory School
- Canterbury Magnet Computer-Based School
- Chandler Elementary Community School
- City View Discovery School
- Clark Street Developmental Learning School
- Columbus Park Preparatory Academy
- Elm Park Community School
- Flagg Street School
- Francis J. McGrath Elementary School
- Gates Lane School
- Goddard School of Science and Technology
- Grafton Street School
- Heard Street Discovery Academy
- Jacob Hiatt Magnet School
- Lake View School
- Lincoln Street School
- May Street School
- Midland Street School
- Nelson Place School
- Norrback Avenue School
- Quinsigamond School
- Rice Square Elementary School
- Roosevelt School
- Tatnuck Magnet School
- Thorndyke Road School
- Union Hill School
- Vernon Hill School
- Wawecus Road School
- West Tatnuck School
- Woodland Academy
- Worcester Arts Magnet School
- Worcester Dual Language Magnet School (formerly Chandler Magnet School)

== See also ==
- List of school districts in Massachusetts
