= Ron Brace =

American football player (1986–2016)

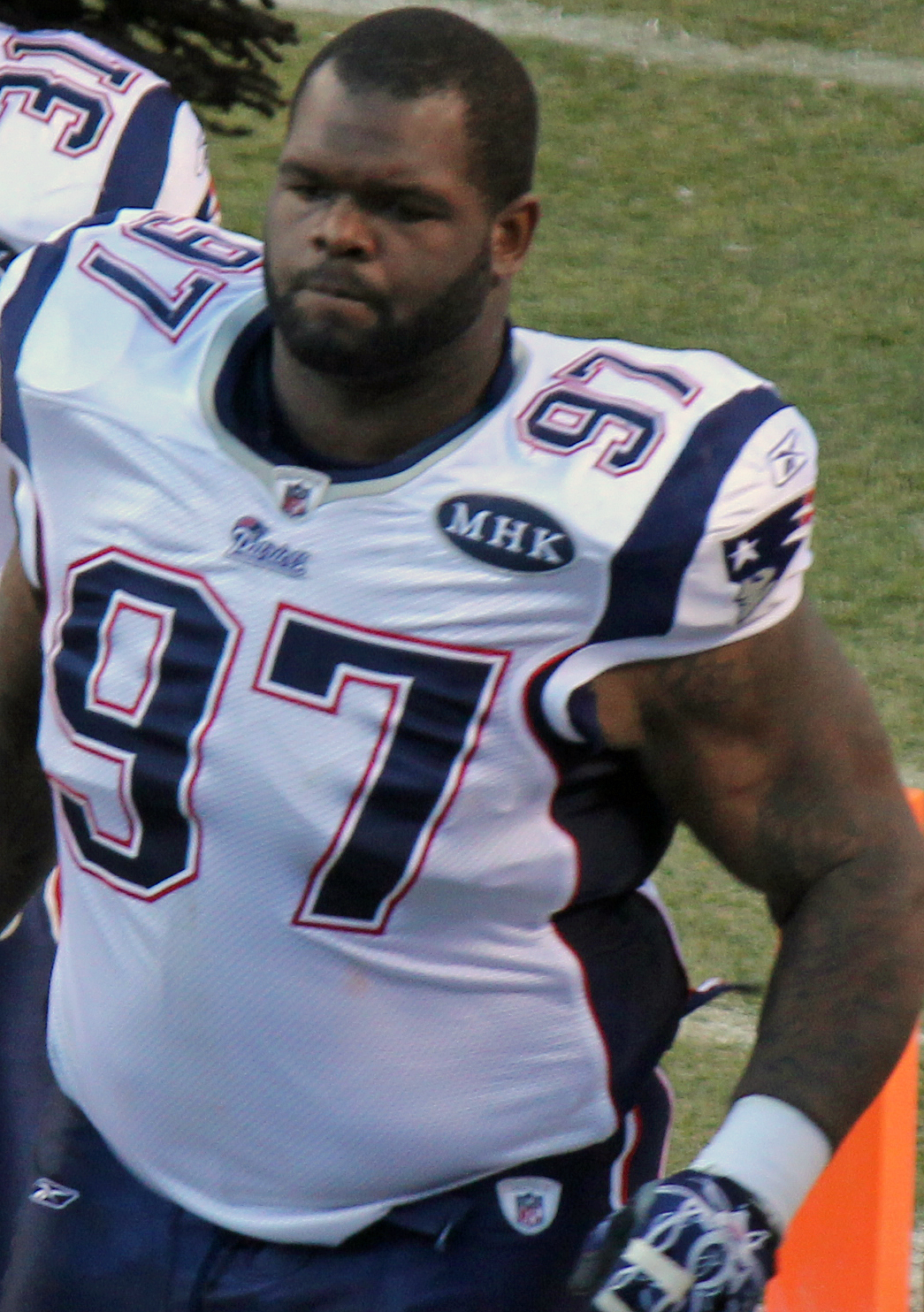
- Brace with the New England Patriots in 2011

No. 92, 97
- Position: Nose tackle

Personal information
- Born: December 18, 1986; Springfield, Massachusetts, U.S.
- Died: April 23, 2016 (aged 29); Springfield, Massachusetts, U.S.
- Listed height: 6 ft 3 in (1.91 m)
- Listed weight: 330 lb (150 kg)

Career information
- High school: Burncoat (Worcester, Massachusetts)
- College: Boston College
- NFL draft: 2009: 2nd round, 40th overall pick

Career history
- New England Patriots (2009–2012); Washington Redskins (2013)*
- * Offseason or practice squad member only

Awards and highlights
- Second-team All-ACC (2008)

Career NFL statistics
- Total tackles: 39
- Forced fumbles: 1
- Stats at Pro Football Reference

Ronald Jeffery Brace III (December 18, 1986 – April 23, 2016) was an American professional football player who was a nose tackle in the National Football League (NFL). He was selected by the New England Patriots in the second round of the 2009 NFL draft as a defensive end. He played college football for the Boston College Eagles.

== Early life ==
Brace attended Burncoat Senior High School in Worcester, Massachusetts. As a senior, Brace earned All-State and Worcester Telegram & Gazette all-star honors. He was also a three-time conference all-star choice and played in the 2004 Massachusetts Shriners Football Classic. He was the team captain and team MVP in 2003 and also excelled in track and field, winning the state shot put title in 2003 and 2004. Brace was rated as a 3-star recruit coming out of high school by both 247 Sports and Rivals. Brace received offers from Boston College, Connecticut, Hofstra, UMass, and Northeastern. He committed to Boston College in February 2004.

== College career ==
After redshirting the 2004 season, Brace made his college debut for Boston College in the 2005 season opener at BYU. He finished the season with 11 tackles (six solos) and one tackle for loss in 12 games (one start). He had one solo tackle against Boise State in the MPC Computers Bowl.

Brace played and started in 11 games at defensive tackle in 2006. He had 20 tackles (11 unassisted) and registered 3.5 tackles for loss. He made a career-high five tackles (three solo), including one tackle-for-loss, and recovered one fumble in BC's Meineke Car Care Bowl victory versus Navy.

Brace finished the 2007 season with 27 total tackles (14 solos), 7.5 tackles for loss, and 2.5 sacks He registered three tackles (one solo) and 0.5 tackles for loss in the ACC Championship Game against Virginia Tech and two tackles in the 2007 Champs Sports Bowl against Michigan State. He was an All-ACC team honorable mention.

Brace began his 2008 senior season on the Outland Trophy and All-ACC team watch lists. He played in all 14 games in 2008, recording 27 tackles and three sacks while paired with defensive tackle B. J. Raji, a first round pick in the 2009 NFL draft. After the season, he was named to the second-team All-ACC.

He was member of the Iota Phi Theta fraternity.

== Professional career ==
=== Pre-draft ===
Pre-draft measurables
Height	Weight	40-yard dash	10-yard split	20-yard split	20-yard shuttle	Three-cone drill	Vertical jump	Broad jump	Bench press	Wonderlic
6 ft 3 in (1.91 m)	330 lb (150 kg)	5.48 s	1.80 s	3.15 s	4.73 s	8.15 s	28 in (0.71 m)	8 ft 3 in (2.51 m)	32 reps	24
All values from NFL Combine

=== New England Patriots ===
==== 2009 season ====
Brace was selected by the Patriots in the second round (40th overall) of the 2009 NFL draft. On July 17, 2009, he was signed to a 4-year contract with approximately $2.82 million in guaranteed money.

Brace was active for six of the first 13 games of the season, recording two tackles. Brace started his first NFL game on December 20, 2009 against the Buffalo Bills in place of an injured Vince Wilfork and Pryor at nose tackle. He started again for the Patriots in Week 16 and finished the season with eight tackles in nine games played (two starts). Brace was inactive for the Patriots' playoff loss against the Baltimore Ravens.

==== 2010 season ====
Prior to the 2010, Brace was moved to defensive end, and missed most of training camp after failing his conditioning test. However, he returned and started the first three games of the regular season, including a four-tackle game in Week 2 against the New York Jets. Brace soon lost his starting job to rookie Brandon Deaderick, and was inactive for the team's Week 7 win over the San Diego Chargers.

Brace was active again in Week 8, and returned to the starting lineup two weeks later against the Pittsburgh Steelers. He was a reserve the next week against the Indianapolis Colts, but tied his season-high of four tackles in the game. Three weeks later, he started the Patriots' Week 13 game in Chicago, but sustained a concussion that kept him out of their Week 15 game against the Green Bay Packers. After playing in Week 16, Brace missed the team's regular season finale with an elbow injury.

Brace was placed on injured reserve on January 3, 2011, prior to the playoffs. He finished the regular season with 23 tackles in 13 games played (five starts).

==== 2011 season ====
Brace started the season on the "PUP" list and returned to practice after week six.

==== 2012 season ====
On December 29, 2012, Brace was released.

=== Washington Redskins ===
Brace signed with the Washington Redskins on February 14, 2013. He was released on August 31, 2013.

== Death ==
Brace died of a heart condition on April 23, 2016, in Springfield, Massachusetts, at the age of 29.
