= Central Massachusetts Athletic Conference =

Central Mass. Athletic Conference

The Central Mass. Athletic Conference (CMAC) is the newest High School sports league in the Massachusetts Interscholastic Athletic Association. The conference is the result of the Inter-High League, Southern Worcester County League, Dual Valley Conference, Colonial Athletic League, and Central Mass. Conference combining to create a super conference. The conference includes 34 Public, Vocational, Charter, and Private schools from the Worcester County and Middlesex County. The newly created conference is a member of the 2nd district of the Massachusetts Interscholastic Athletic Association's nine districts, being the only athletic league assigned to the district.

The conference was created for schools to do better under the new MIAA state tournament format; allowing them to more easily schedule stronger opponents. This is done by creating alignments based on power rankings from recent seasons at the beginning of each year.

CMAC Southeast Area
CMAC Worcester Area

== Member Schools ==
School	Location	Mascot	Colors	Year Founded	Enrollment	Type of school	Former League
Abby Kelley Foster Charter Public School	Worcester, Massachusetts	Bears	Maroon & Gold	1998	1,426	Charter	CAL
Advanced Math and Science Academy Charter School	Marlborough, Massachusetts	Eagles	Navy Blue, Orange, & White	2005	963	Charter	CAL
Assabet Valley Regional Technical High School	Marlborough, Massachusetts	Aztecs	Blue & Gold	1973	1,131	Vocational	CAL
Auburn High School	Auburn, Massachusetts	Rockets	Blue & White	1935	831	Public	SWCL
Bartlett High School	Webster, Massachusetts	Indians	Green & White		437	Public	SWCL
Bay Path Regional Vocational Technical High School	Charlton, Massachusetts	Minutemen	Purple & Gold	1972	1,180	Vocational	CAL
Blackstone-Millville Regional High School	Blackstone, Massachusetts	Chargers	Purple & Gold	1868	528	Public	DVC
Blackstone Valley Regional Vocational Technical High School	Upton, Massachusetts	Beavers	Purple, Black, & White	1964	1,236	Vocational	CAL
Burncoat High School	Worcester, Massachusetts	Patriots	Green & White	1964	1,000	Public	Inter-High
David Prouty High School	Spencer, Massachusetts	Panthers	Black & Orange	1889	321	Public	SWCL
Doherty Memorial High School	Worcester, Massachusetts	Highlanders	Maroon & Gold	1966	1,756	Public	Inter-High
Douglas High School	Douglas, Massachusetts	Tigers	Blue & White		258	Public	DVC
Hopedale Junior Senior High School	Hopedale, Massachusetts	Blue Raiders	Blue & White	1889	467	Public	DVC
Keefe Technical High School	Framingham, Massachusetts	Broncos	Blue & Orange	1967	907	Vocational	CAL
Leicester High School	Leicester, Massachusetts	Wolverines		1856	409	Public	SWCL
Main South*	Worcester, Massachusetts	Cougars		2025	675	Charter	Inter-High
Millbury High School	Millbury, Massachusetts	Woolies	Maroon & White	1851	691	Public	SWCL
Montachusett Regional Vocational Technical School	Fitchburg, Massachusetts	Bulldogs	Purple & Gold	1965	1,403	Vocational	CAL
Nipmuc Regional High School	Upton, Massachusetts	Warriors	Green, White & Gold	1961	475	Public	DVC
North High School	Worcester, Massachusetts	Polar Bears	Orange & Black	1911	1,377	Public	Inter-High
Northbridge High School	Northbridge, Massachusetts	Rams	Maroon & White	1866	581	Public	SWCL
Notre Dame Academy	Worcester, Massachusetts	Rebels	Green & Gold	1951	248	Private	Central Mass Conference
Oxford High School	Oxford, Massachusetts	Pirates	Orange & Black	1906	448	Public	SWCL
Francis W. Parker Charter Essential School	Devens, Massachusetts	Panther	Green, White & Black	1995	345	Charter	CAL
Quaboag Regional Middle High School	Warren, Massachusetts	Cougars	Maroon & White	1966	331	Public	SWCL
St. Bernard's High School	Fitchburg, Massachusetts	Bernardians	Blue & Gold	1920	223	Private	Central Mass Conference
St. Paul Diocesan Junior-Senior High School	Worcester, Massachusetts	Knights	Black & Gold	2020/1942†	349	Private	Central Mass Conference
South High Community School	Worcester, Massachusetts	Colonels	Red, Black, & White	1901	1,770	Public	Inter-High
Southbridge High School	Southbridge, Massachusetts	Pioneers	Red & White	1916	404	Public	SWCL
Sutton High School	Sutton, Massachusetts	Sammies & Suzies	Kelly Green & White	1835	336	Public	DVC
Tantasqua Regional High School	Sturbridge, Massachusetts	Warriors	Green & Gold	1953	609	Public	SWCL
Uxbridge High School	Uxbridge, Massachusetts	Spartans	Black & Orange	1896	596	Public	SWCL
Whitinsville Christian School	Northbridge, Massachusetts	Crusaders	Blue & Gold	1928	484 (K-12)	Private	DVC
Worcester Technical High School	Worcester, Massachusetts	Eagles	Royal Blue, Silver, & White	1909	1,409	Vocational	CAL

*Main South is the combination of Claremont Academy and University Park Campus School, both from the Inter-High league

†St. Paul Diocesan was originally founded as Holy Name High school in 1942. In 2020 it merged with Saint Peter-Marian High School to become St. Paul Diocesan

== State Championships ==
Below is a list of state championships for sports sanctioned by the Massachusetts Interscholastic Athletic Association won by schools while they were members of the Central Massachusetts Athletic Conference since the league's inception in the fall of 2025.

=== Cross Country ===
==== Boys ====
- Parker Charter - 2025 D3

=== Field Hockey ===
- Uxbridge - 2025 D3H

=== Fall Volleyball ===
- Hopedale - 2025 D5

=== Soccer ===
==== Girls ====
- Sutton - 2025 D4

=== Indoor Track ===
==== Boys ====
- Parker Charter - 2026 D5

=== Basketball ===
==== Girls ====
- Hopedale - 2026 D5

=== Softball ===
- AMSA - 2026 D4
