= Ned Eames =

American businessman, non-profit administrator, and former tennis player

- Born: Massachusetts, U.S.
- Education: San Diego State University

Ned Eames is an American businessman, non-profit administrator, and lifelong tennis player who is the founder and CEO of Tenacity, a non-profit organization based in Boston, Massachusetts.

== Early life ==
Eames was born in Massachusetts. He was a top junior tennis player and played for Doherty Memorial High School in Worcester. He graduated from San Diego State University and was the captain of the tennis team in 1982 and 1983. He received an MBA from Boston University.

== Career ==
Eames played on the ATP Satellite Tour from 1983 through 1985. In 2013, Eames was inducted into the United States Tennis Association New England Hall of Fame.

Since its founding in 1999, Tenacity has helped underserved Boston youth achieve post-secondary success by developing academic skills and character through literacy, tutoring, mentoring, and family engagement activities, along with tennis and fitness. Tenacity's Summer Tennis & Reading program operates in Boston, Worcester, and Chelsea, serving approximately 5,000 students annually.

== Awards ==
In 2012, the International Tennis Hall of Fame awarded Eames a Tennis Educational Merit Award. The award is given annually to those who have made notable contributions to the field of tennis education at the national level while demonstrating leadership and creative skills in areas such as instruction, writing, organization, and promotion of the game of tennis.
