= Yawin Smallwood =

American football player (born 1991)

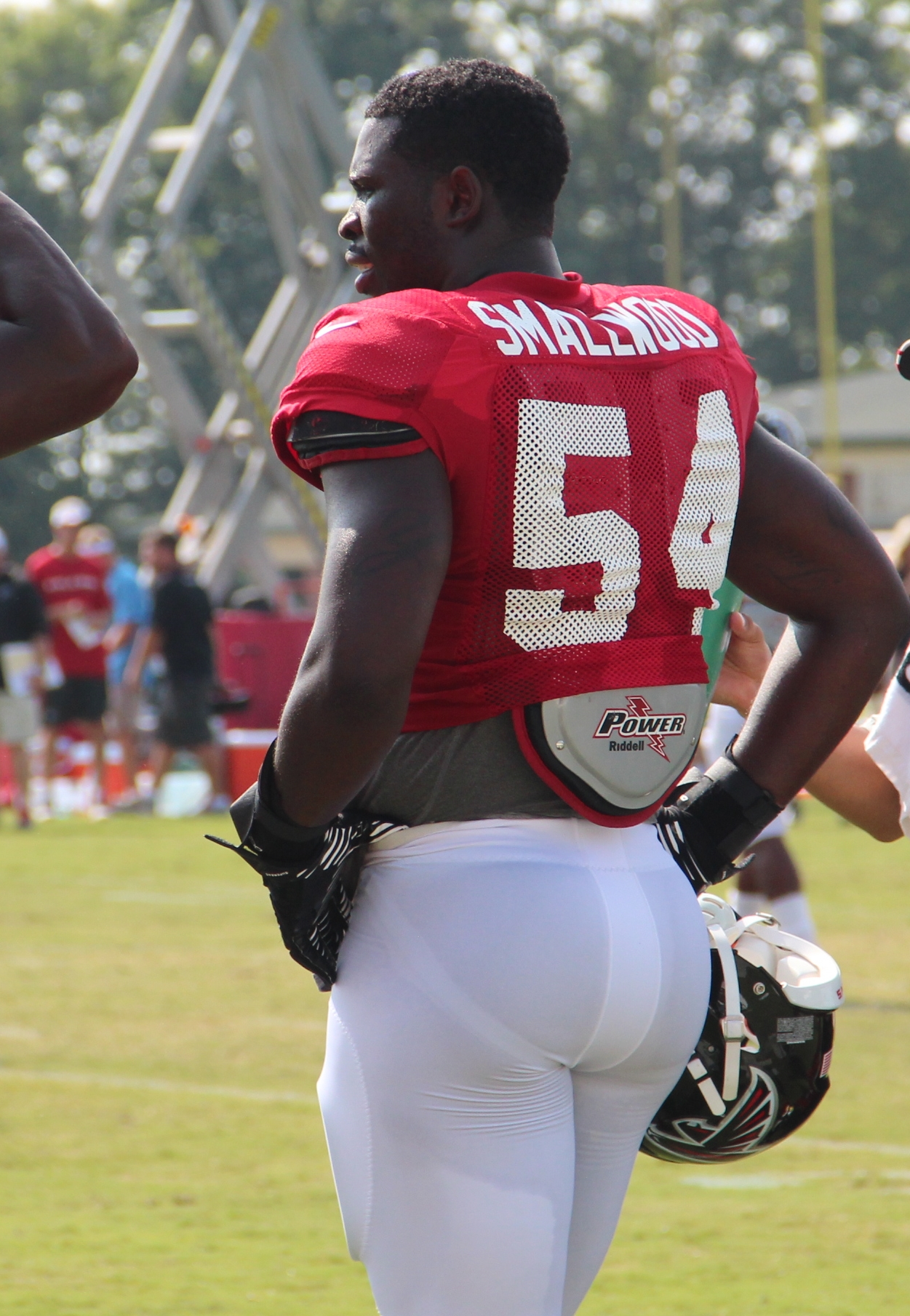
- Smallwood with the Atlanta Falcons in 2014

No. 54
- Position: Linebacker

Personal information
- Born: December 25, 1991 (age 34); Worcester, Massachusetts, U.S.
- Listed height: 6 ft 2 in (1.88 m)
- Listed weight: 246 lb (112 kg)

Career information
- High school: Doherty Memorial (Worcester, Massachusetts)
- College: UConn
- NFL draft: 2014: 7th round, 253rd overall pick

Career history
- Atlanta Falcons (2014)*; Tennessee Titans (2014–2015)*
- * Offseason or practice squad member only

Awards and highlights
- First-team All-AAC (2013); First-team All-Big East (2012)
- Stats at Pro Football Reference

Yawin Alexander Smallwood (born December 25, 1991) is an American former football linebacker. He was selected by the Atlanta Falcons in the seventh round of the 2014 NFL draft. He played college football at University of Connecticut. He was also a member of the Tennessee Titans.

== Early life ==
Smallwood attended Doherty Memorial High School in Worcester, Massachusetts. He recorded 71 tackles as a senior in 2009 with five sacks, rushed for 769 yards and 10 touchdowns and also passed for 126 yards. As a junior, playing as a quarterback, he passed for 726 yards and six touchdowns and rushed for 724 yards and six touchdowns. He was a three-time Division I all-star and two-time Division I Defensive MVP.

Considered a three-star recruit by Rivals.com, he was rated as the 4th best prospect in the state of Massachusetts. He accepted a scholarship from Connecticut.

== College career ==
After redshirting in 2010, he enjoyed a terrific first year of playing collegiate football in 2011 by starting all 12 games at middle linebacker. He was the second-leading tackler on the team with 94 stops, just three off the team lead, and also had 2.5 tackles for a loss, 1.5 sacks and a 28-yard interception returned for a TD. As a redshirt sophomore, he was a first team All-Big East selection in 2012 and led the Huskies in tackles with 120 and was second in tackles for a loss with 15 and also had four sacks and two forced fumbles. In 2013, he led the team in tackles with 118, was second in tackles for loss with 9.5, he also had four sacks and had a 59-yard interception return TD against Temple, and was named first-team All-AAC.

On December 7, 2013, Smallwood announced he would forgo his remaining eligibility and enter the 2014 NFL draft.

== Professional career ==
He was drafted by the Atlanta Falcons in the seventh round (253rd overall) of the 2014 NFL draft. The Falcons waived Smallwood on August 29, 2014. On November 20, 2014, Smallwood was signed to the Tennessee Titans practice squad.
