= Tri-County Regional Vocational Technical High School =

Tri-County Regional Technical Vocational High School
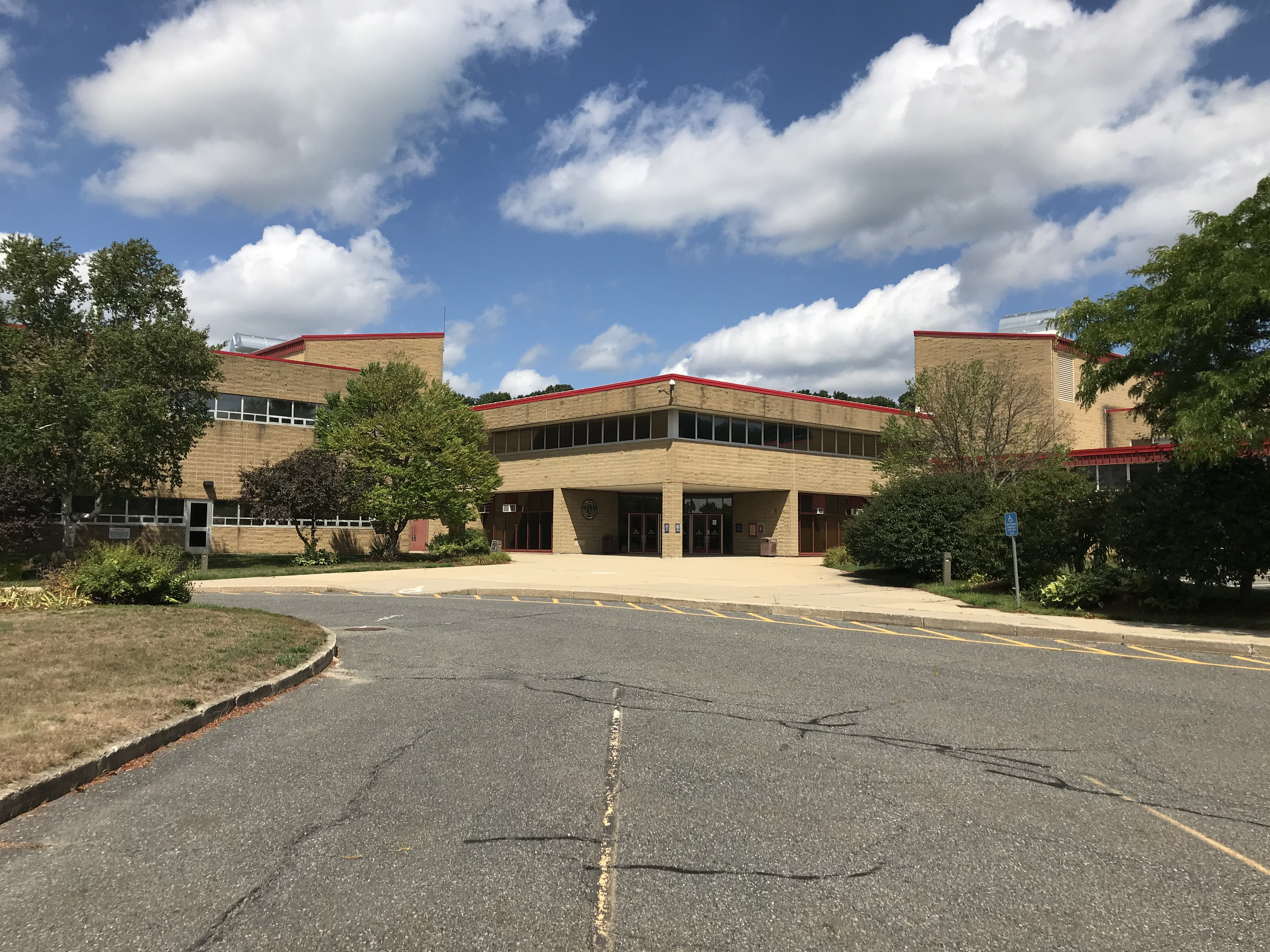
- Tri-County Regional Vocational Technical High School

Location
- 147 Pond Street; Franklin, MA, 02038; United States; 42.0949°N 71.4216°W

Information
- School type: Public High School
- Motto: Work Hard, Today Counts
- Established: 1977
- Superintendent: Karen Maguire
- Principal: Dana Walsh
- Teaching staff: 85.90 (FTE)
- Grades: 9–12
- Enrollment: 964 (2023–2024)
- Student to teacher ratio: 11.22
- Colors: Navy Blue & Vegas Gold
- Athletics: MIAA - Mayflower League
- Mascot: Cougar
- Rival: Old Colony Regional Vocational Technical High School
- Budget: $19,216,655 total $19,303 per pupil (2016)
- Communities served: Franklin, Medfield, Medway, Millis, Norfolk North Attleborough, Plainville, Seekonk, Sherborn, walpole, Wrentham

Tri-County Regional Vocational Technical High School, often abbreviated Tri-County or just Tri, is a public vocational high school in Franklin, Massachusetts, United States.

== District ==
The towns composing the district are:

- Franklin, Massachusetts
- Medfield, Massachusetts
- Medway, Massachusetts
- Millis, Massachusetts
- Norfolk, Massachusetts
- North Attleborough, Massachusetts
- Plainville, Massachusetts
- Seekonk, Massachusetts
- Sherborn, Massachusetts
- Walpole, Massachusetts
- Wrentham, Massachusetts

== Curriculum ==
=== Academics ===
Students receive a full academic education including:

- English
- Mathematics
- Science
- Social Studies
- Business Technology
- Physical Education
- Health

The College Board placed Tri-County Regional Vocational Technical High School on the 2014 AP District Honor Roll for the school’s significant gains in student access to and success in Advanced Placement courses. Tri-County was one of 547 school districts in the United States and Canada to be named to the 5th annual Honor Roll. The list recognizes school districts that have increased the number of students participating in AP while improving the number of students earning AP Exam scores of 3 or higher.

Ninety-four percent of Tri-County tenth graders scored a proficient or higher on the ELA portion of the Massachusetts Comprehensive Assessment System test in the spring of 2014. As a result of their performance, Tri-County was named a Level 1 school on the state's 5-point accountability system for the third straight year. This means the school meets gap narrowing goals.

=== Career Programs ===
The 17 Career Programs, known as “shops”, offered at Tri-County. They include:

- Automotive Technology
- Carpentry
- Computer Information Systems
- Cosmetology
- Culinary Arts
- Dental Assisting
- Early Education
- Electrical Wiring Technology
- Engineering Technology (Advanced Manufacturing)
- Facilities Management and Sustainability
- Health Careers
- Graphic Communications
- Heating, Ventilation, Air Conditioning, and Refrigeration
- Legal and Protective Services
- Medical Assisting
- Metal Fabrication
- Plumbing and Hydronic Heating

The newest program added was facilities management and sustainability, added during the 2024-2025 school year.

== Athletics ==
Tri-County offers many sports for students. They include:

- Baseball
- Boys and Girls Basketball
- Cheerleading (Fall and Winter)
- Cross Country
- Football
- Golf (Fall)
- Ice Hockey
- Indoor Track
- Boys and Girls Lacrosse
- Outdoor Track and Field
- Boys and Girls Soccer
- Softball
- Volleyball
- Wrestling

Tri-County is a member of the Mayflower League. The league is made up of the following high schools:

- Avon High School
- Wareham
- Bristol-Plymouth Regional Technical School
- Bristol County Agricultural High School
- Blue Hills Regional Technical School
- Diman Regional Vocational Technical High School
- Holbrook Junior Senior High School
- Norfolk County Agricultural High School
- Old Colony Regional Vocational Technical High School (Cougars Cup)
- Southeastern Regional Vocational Technical High School
- South Shore Vocational Technical High School
- Upper Cape Cod Regional Technical High School
- Cape Cod Regional Vocational Technical High School
- Atlantis Charter
- Westport High School

== Adult Education ==
Tri-County also offers Adult Education courses. The Adult Education office offers Postsecondary programs in the Cosmetology and Nursing fields. The office also offers courses aimed at building career and life skills.

== Notable alumni ==
- Bobby Santos III, NASCAR Modified division racer

== See also ==
- List of High Schools In Massachusetts
