= Quaboag Regional Middle High School =

Quaboag Regional Middle/High School
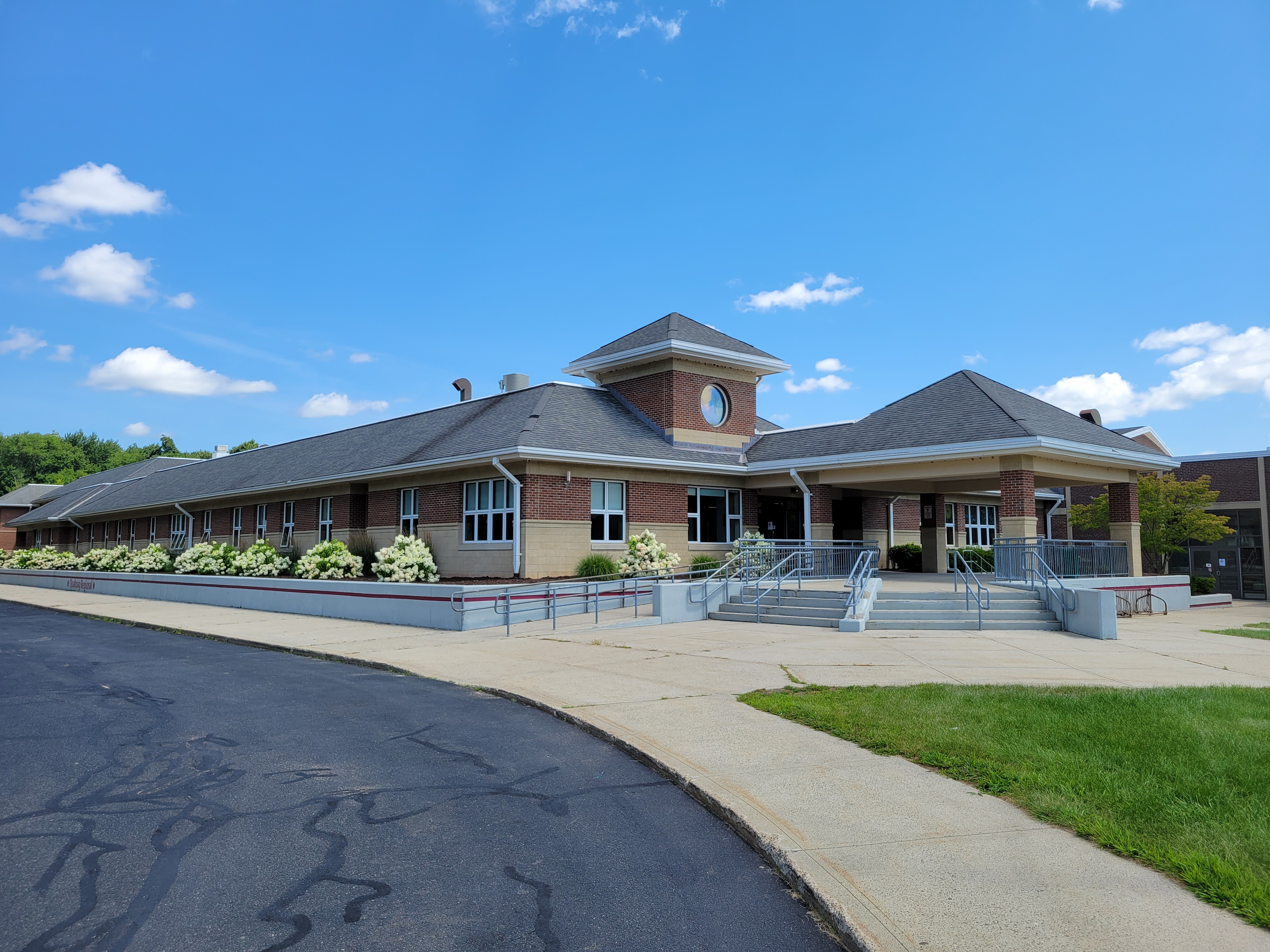
- Quaboag Regional Middle High School

Location
- 284 Old West Brookfield Road; Warren, Massachusetts 01083; United States
- Coordinates: 42.2204°N 72.1879°W

Information
- Type: Public; Open enrollment
- Established: 1966; 60 years ago
- Principal: John Diorio
- Grades: 7–12
- Enrollment: 530 (2024–25)
- Colors: Maroon & White
- Athletics conference: Central Massachusetts Athletic Conference
- Mascot: Cougar
- Communities served: Warren, West Brookfield
- Website: www.quaboagrsd.org/qrmhs/

Quaboag Regional Middle/High School is a public middle/high school in south-central Massachusetts, serving the towns of Warren and West Brookfield.

== Overview ==
Quaboag Regional Middle/High School is located in the town of Warren. Currently, there are approximately 530 students in grades 7 through 12. The school colors are maroon and white and the school mascot is a cougar.

== History ==
The Quaboag Regional School District was established in 1966 between the communities of Warren and West Brookfield as a grade 7-12 district and was later expanded in 1988 into a unified PK-12 district. Prior to 1966, all students from Warren and West Brookfield attended Warren High School, except for 3 years (1966, 1967 & 1968) that some students were bused to Minnechaug Regional High School in Wilbraham, MA.

In a study to find America's best high schools, U.S. News evaluated schools across 49 states plus the District of Columbia and awarded schools gold, silver, and bronze medals based on state proficiency standards, how well they prepare students for college, and other factors. Quaboag was awarded a silver medal, ranked 58th in Massachusetts, and ranked 1,649th nationally in the study, which evaluated more than 22,000 schools.

== Athletics ==
Quaboag competes in the Southern Worcester County League (West). Quaboag has varsity teams in the following sports: Baseball, Softball, Basketball, Cheerleading, Cross Country, Golf, Indoor Track, Field Hockey, Football, Soccer, Track & Field, and Tennis. Quaboag has captured a total of seven state titles, four (1985, 1986, 2004, & 2006) in girls' basketball and three (1995, 1998, & 2007) in field hockey, respectively.

== Extra Curriculars ==
There are many after school activities that students have the opportunity to participate in. These include, and are not limited to, Environmental Club, Art Club, Astronomy Club, Drama Club (which hosts a fall play and spring musical), Math Meets, Forensics Club (middle school students only), the Gay Straight Alliance, Jazz Band, and Chorus.
