= Murdock Middle/High School =

Public school in Winchendon, MA

Location
- 3 Memorial Drive; Winchendon, Massachusetts 01475; United States; 42.6990°N 72.0437°W

Information
- School type: Public
- Superintendent: Charlotte King
- High School Principal: Kristie Barry-Ayres
- Middle School Principal: Dr. Nate Mayo
- Grades: 6-12
- Athletics conference: Midland Wachusett League

Murdock Middle/High School (MMHS) is a public middle/high school located in Winchendon, Massachusetts. The current middle school principal is Dr. Nate Mayo, and the current high school principal is Kristie Barry-Ayres. The superintendent is Charlotte King. The school implements the Summit Learning program for grades 6-8.

== Athletics ==
Murdock participates in a wide range of athletics, including cheering, football, soccer, baseball, softball, and basketball.
