= University Park Campus School =

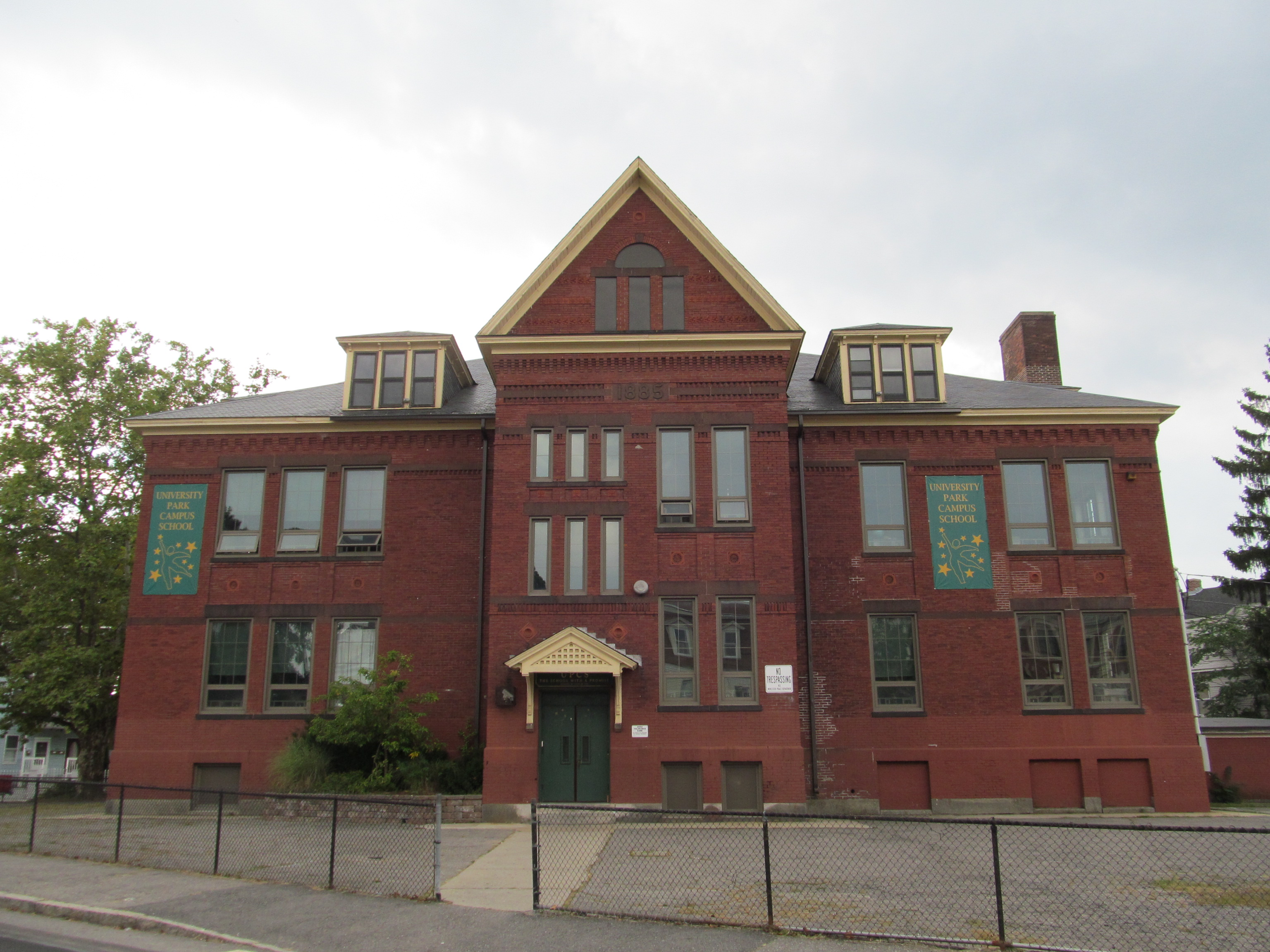
- University Park Campus School

Location
- 12 Freeland Street; Worcester, Massachusetts; United States; 42.2469°N 71.8252°W

Information
- Type: Public; Open enrollment
- Established: 1997
- School district: Worcester Public Schools
- Principal: Kaitlin Kelley-Snow
- Faculty: 20.85 (FTE)
- Grades: 7–12
- Enrollment: 244 (2023–24)
- Student to teacher ratio: 11.70
- Athletics conference: Central Massachusetts Athletic Conference
- Website: www.worcesterschools.org/o/up

The University Park Campus School is a public school in the Main South neighborhood of Worcester, Massachusetts, United States. It had 244 students in grades 7–12 as of 2023–24. Opened in 1997, the school is operated by a partnership between nearby Clark University and Worcester Public Schools. In March 2010, Massachusetts Governor Deval Patrick visited the school to promote educational reform.
