= Mary E. Wells School =

- U.S. National Register of Historic Places
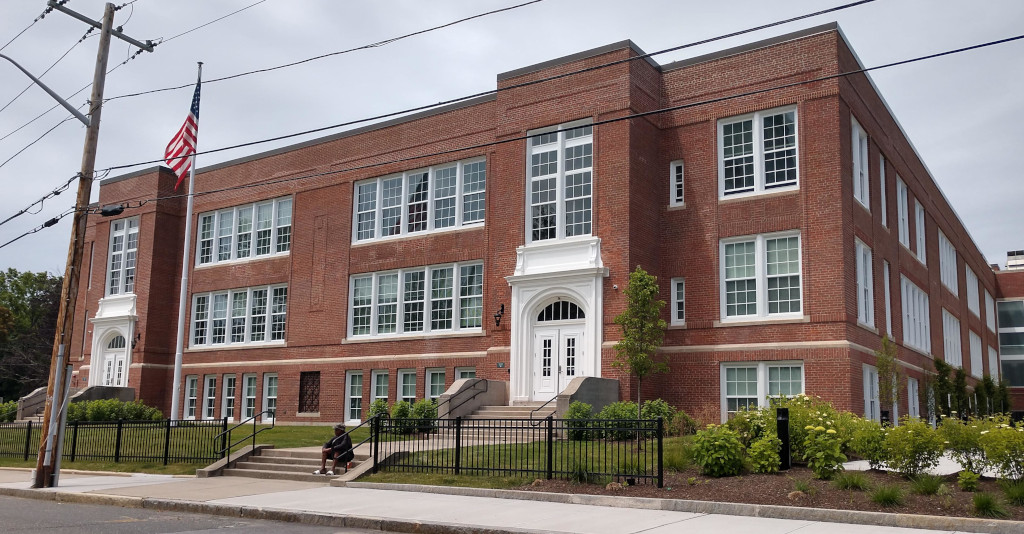
- Mary E. Wells School (2023)

- Location within Massachusetts Location within the United States
- Location: 80 Marcy St., Southbridge, Massachusetts
- Coordinates: 42°4′40″N 72°2′15″W
- Built: 1916
- Architect: Peabody & Stearns
- NRHP reference No.: 100008958
- Added to NRHP: May 3, 2023

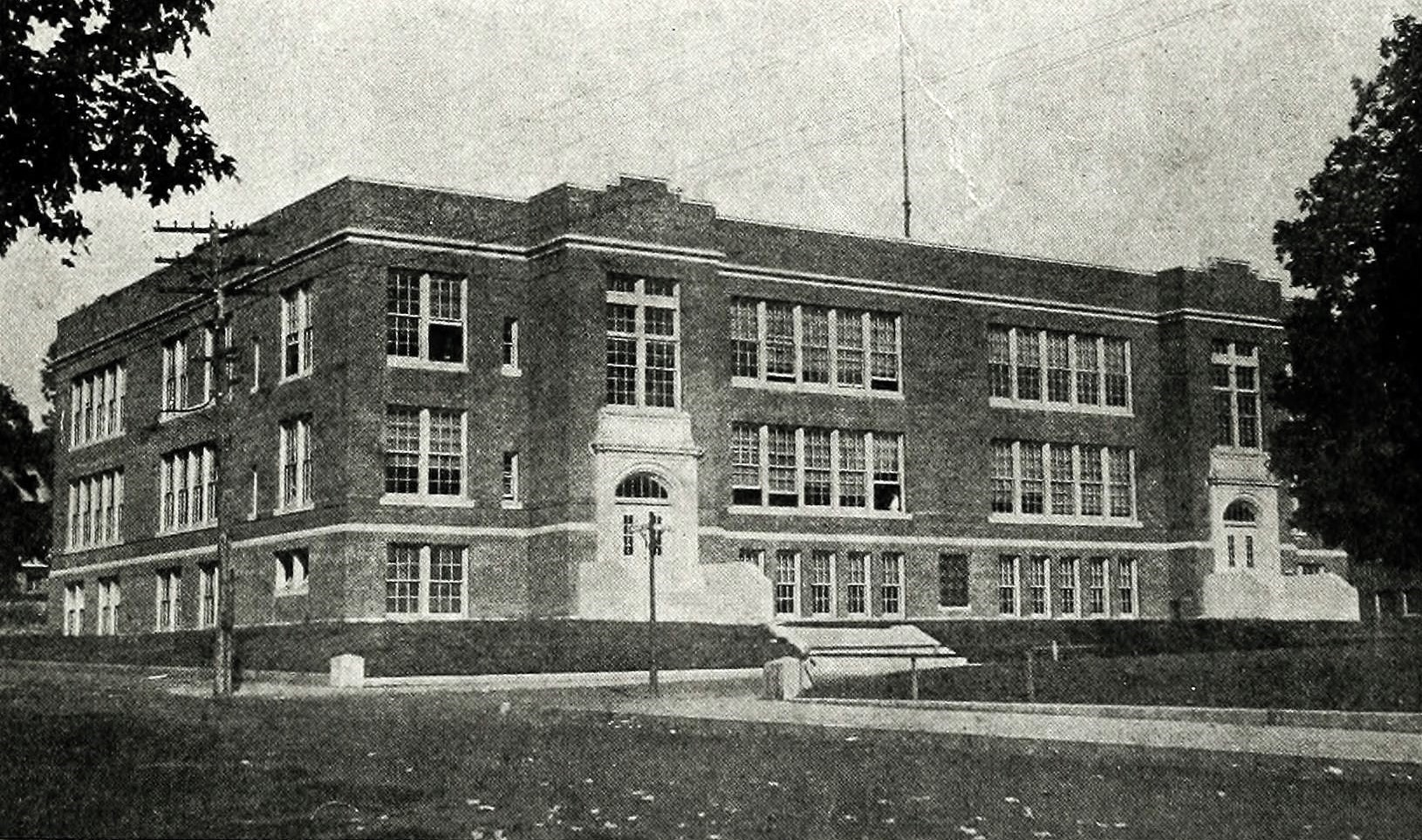
The school in 1918

The Mary E. Wells School is a historic school building at 80 Marcy Street in Southbridge, Massachusetts. Built in 1916, it is one the last known commissions of the architectural firm Peabody & Stearns. It was built with funding from Mary E. Wells, wife of George Wells, founder of the locally prominent American Optical Company. The building was listed on the National Register of Historic Places in 2023. The building was used as a school until 2012, and has since been converted into residences.

== Description and history ==
The former Mary E. Wells School building stands west of downtown Southbridge, on a large parcel at the northwest corner of Marcy Street and Main Street (Massachusetts Route 131). It is a U-shaped two-story masonry structure, built out of brick with cast stone trim, and set on a raised basement. The main façade, facing Marcy Street, is adorned by two projecting entry pavilions with elaborate door surrounds.

The school was built in 1916 to a design by Peabody & Stearns, and is believed to be one that firm's last commissions. Originally more elaborate, the building design was simplified to reduce construction costs. It was expanded several times, in 1925 and again in the 1980s. It served as the city's first purpose-built high school, previous secondary school education having been given in the town hall. It remained in use as the high school until 1960, when the current Southbridge High School opened. It was converted into a junior high school, and was closed in 2012. The building is named for Mary E. Wells, wife of American Optical founder George Wells, who was the first woman elected to public office in the community, serving on its board of education in the 1890s. It has since been converted to residential use.

== See also ==
- National Register of Historic Places listings in Southbridge, Massachusetts
- National Register of Historic Places listings in Worcester County, Massachusetts
