= North High School (Worcester, Massachusetts) =

Coordinates: 42°15′43.0″N 71°46′0.7″W

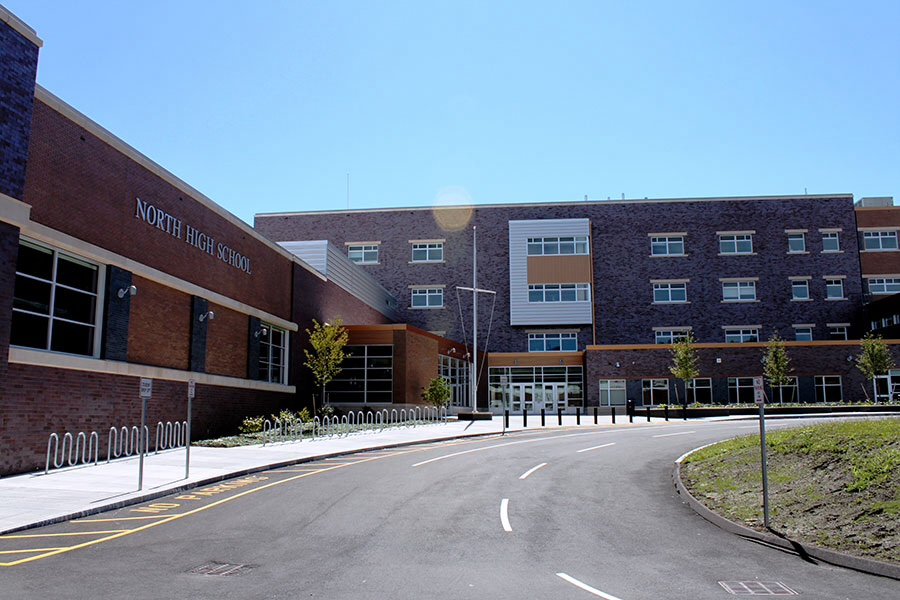
- 140 Harrington Way; Worcester, Massachusetts 01604; United States

Information
- Type: Public; Open enrollment
- Established: c. 1972
- School district: Worcester Public Schools
- CEEB code: 222505
- Principal: Edward Walker
- Teaching staff: 99.62 (FTE)
- Grades: 9 to 12
- Enrollment: 1,420 (2023–2024)
- Student to teacher ratio: 14.25
- Colors: Orange and Black
- Slogan: T.E.A.M Together Everyone Achieves More
- Athletics conference: Central Massachusetts Athletic Conference
- Team name: Polar Bears
- Website: https://www.worcesterschools.org/o/nhs

North High School (or Worcester North) is a public four-year high school and one of five public high schools in Worcester, Massachusetts, United States.

The original North High was located on Harrington Way and was built in 1972 as a junior high school. It became North High in 1980 when the old North High on Salisbury Street was closed, sold to a private developer and subsequently turned into condos. There are approximately 1,300 students that attend North, which boasts a diverse student body. Non-Hispanic Whites make up 11 percent of the student body while Hispanics make up 34 percent. African-Americans comprise 47 percent and Asians make up 8 percent.

The mascot of North High is a polar bear and the school colors are black and orange.

North High School offers a variety of extra-curricular activities such as clubs and sports. It is also most noted for their boys basketball team, which won the district title in 2005. In March 2023, the boys basketball team won the MIAA Division 1 Basketball State Championship at the Tsongas Center in Lowell, MA. In March 2024, the boys basketball team claimed their second consecutive MIAA Division 1 Basketball State Championship. They completed the 2023-2024 season undefeated, finishing 24-0.

North High's building was considered old and run down. The new building was ready for use in 2011 and is approximately 225,000 square feet (20,900 m^{2}). The Worcester City Council gave the go-ahead to a new North High in 2000, when the cost was estimated at $5 million. But the project was slow to get off the ground while on the waiting list for a construction grant, while the State Department of Education and the State Treasurer reorganized the School Building Assistance Program. The ten-year delay and rising construction costs pushed the price tag of the new school to $8 million.

The new building opened for the 2011–2012 school year.

== Demographics ==
According to the Massachusetts Department of Education, the approximate demographic profile of North High School is as follows in the 2016-2017 school year:

- Hispanic - 34%
- White - 11%
- African American - 47%
- Asian - 8%
