= Burncoat High School =

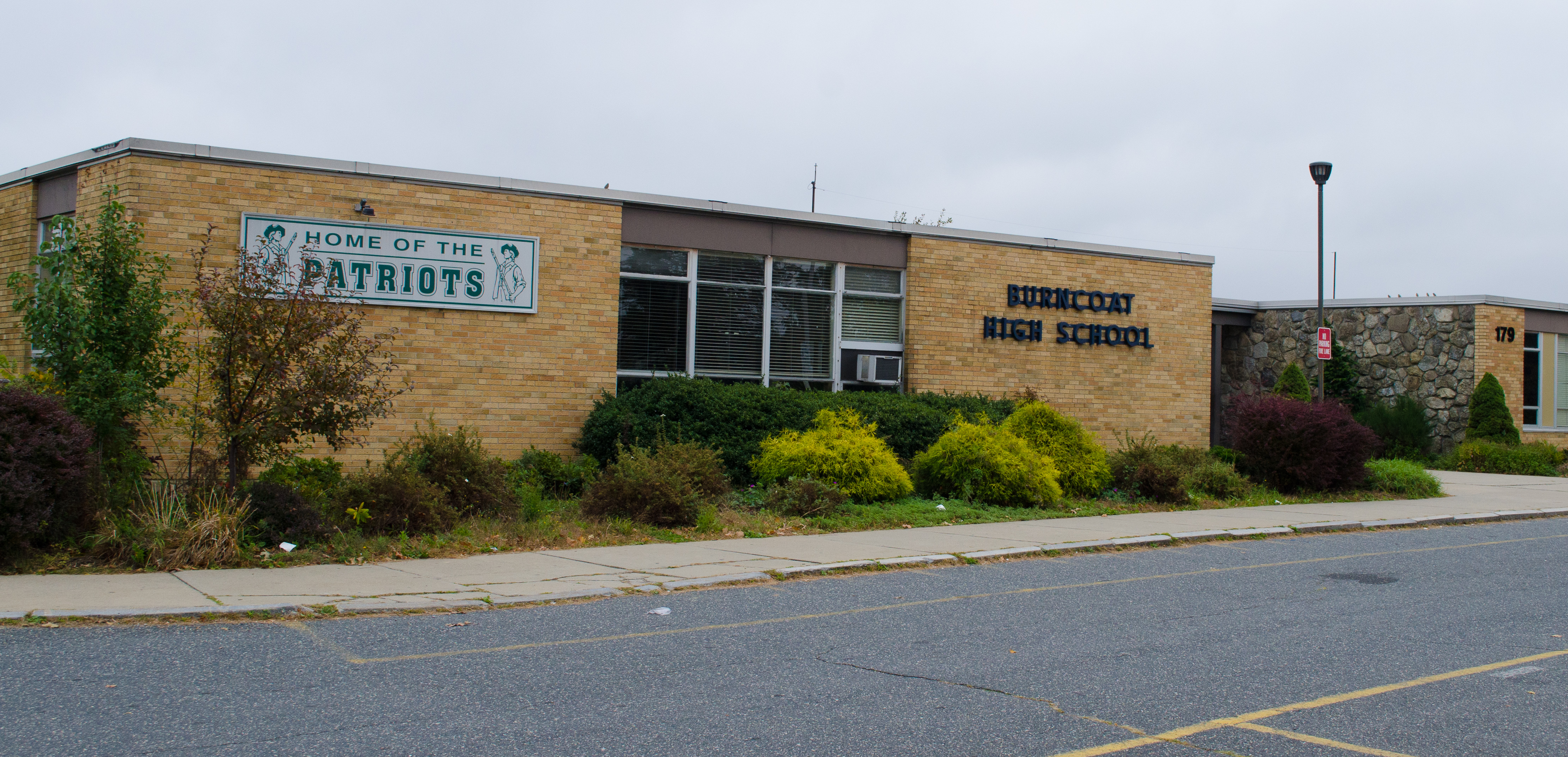

Location
- 179 Burncoat Street; Worcester, Massachusetts 01606; United States; 42°17′54″N 71°47′20″W

Information
- Type: Public; Open enrollment
- Established: c. 1964
- School district: Worcester Public Schools
- CEEB code: 222482
- Principal: Joseph Ewick
- Staff: 91.30 (FTE)
- Grades: 9-12
- Enrollment: 1,073 (2024-2025)
  - Grade 9: 277
  - Grade 10: 269
  - Grade 11: 248
  - Grade 12: 256
  - SP: 23
- Student to teacher ratio: 12.31
- Colors: Green and White
- Slogan: T.E.A.M. Together Everyone Achieves More
- Athletics conference: Central Massachusetts Athletic Conference
- Team name: Patriots
- Rival: Doherty Memorial High School
- Newspaper: The Green Revival
- Yearbook: The Greenbook
- Website: https://www.worcesterschools.org/o/bhs

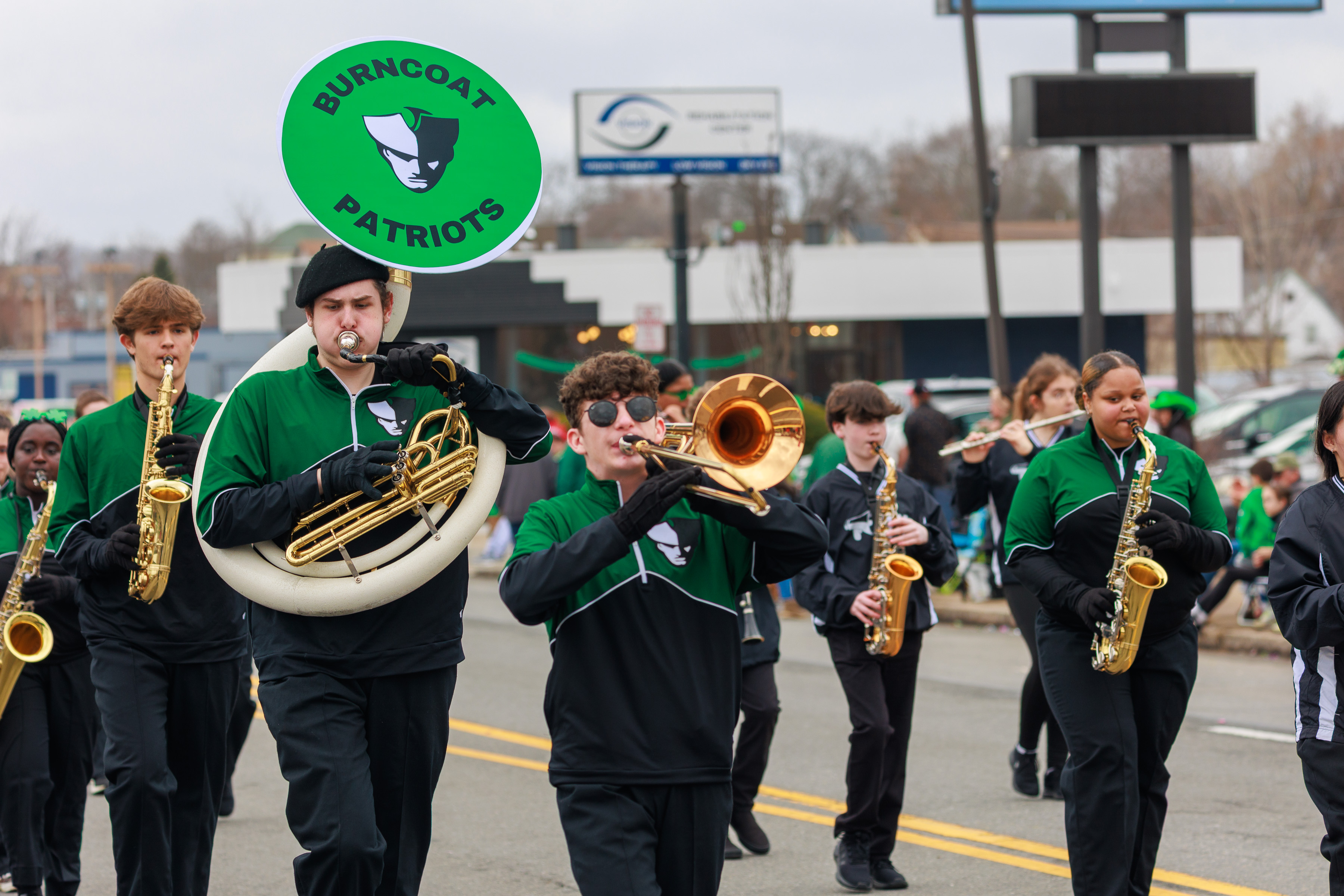
Burncoat High School pep band

Burncoat High School is a public magnet high school in Worcester, Massachusetts, in the United States. The school was formerly known as Burncoat Senior High School chiefly to distinguish it from the adjacent Burncoat Junior High School, now Burncoat Middle School.

The school has about 1,100 students, in grades 9 to 12, in the Worcester Public Schools district. The school's principal is Joseph Ewick. The school serves the north side of Worcester.

== Varsity sports ==
Burncoat High School has varsity sports including baseball, basketball, crew, cross country, field hockey, football, golf, ice hockey, lacrosse, soccer, softball, swimming, tennis, track, volleyball and wrestling. The Burncoat football team won the Central Mass Super Bowl championship in 2004 against St. Joseph's.

== Competitive teams ==
=== FIRST Robotics ===
Since 2006 Burncoat High School has competed in the FIRST Robotics Competition. The team is known as the Green Reapers and is sponsored by Worcester Polytechnic Institute and Boston Scientific. Over the years the team has won the Rhode Island District Event in 2015 and the Chairman's Award at the Southern New Hampshire District Event in 2017 and 2019. The team has competed in the world championships three times in 2010, 2013, and 2014.

== Partnership with Quinsigamond Community College ==
Quinsigamond Community College has partnered with Burncoat High School for its automotive program.

== Notable alumni ==
- Paul Bilzerian, businessman and felon convicted of securities fraud
- Ron Brace, defensive lineman for the New England Patriots of the National Football League
- Michael Bradley, NBA basketball player
- John J. Mahoney 1982, politician who represents the 13th Worcester District in the Massachusetts House of Representatives
- Eddie Mekka, actor
- Geoffrey Zakarian, 1977, restaurateur, television personality and author
