= West Boylston Middle/High School =

Location
- 125 Crescent Street; West Boylston, Massachusetts; United States
- Coordinates: 42°22′23″N 71°47′28″W

Information
- Type: Public; Open enrollment
- Principal: Christopher "Chris" Fournier
- Teaching staff: 45.72 (FTE)
- Grades: 6–12
- Enrollment: 433 (2022–2023)
- Student to teacher ratio: 9.47
- Colors: Blue and White
- Athletics conference: Midland Wachusett League
- Website: http://www.wbschools.com/wbmhs

West Boylston Middle/High School is a public high school located in West Boylston, Massachusetts, United States. In the 2012 rankings of U.S. News & World Report Best High Schools, West Boylston Middle/High School ranked at #41 within Massachusetts. The school serves grades 6-12 with a student to teacher ratio of 13:1.

== Anti-bullying policies ==
People magazine reported on its decade old zero-tolerance bullying policy following a bully-related disaster in a nearby town.

== Athletics ==
The West Boylston/Tahanto Regional High School football team won the 2012 Massachusetts Division 5 Super Bowl, defeating Leicester, 14-6. The Lions finished the season with a 12-1 record, the most wins by a football team in the school's history. The final game was played at Worcester State University's John F. Coughlin Field.
