= Francis W. Parker Charter Essential School =

Coordinates: 42.548773°N 71.606323°W

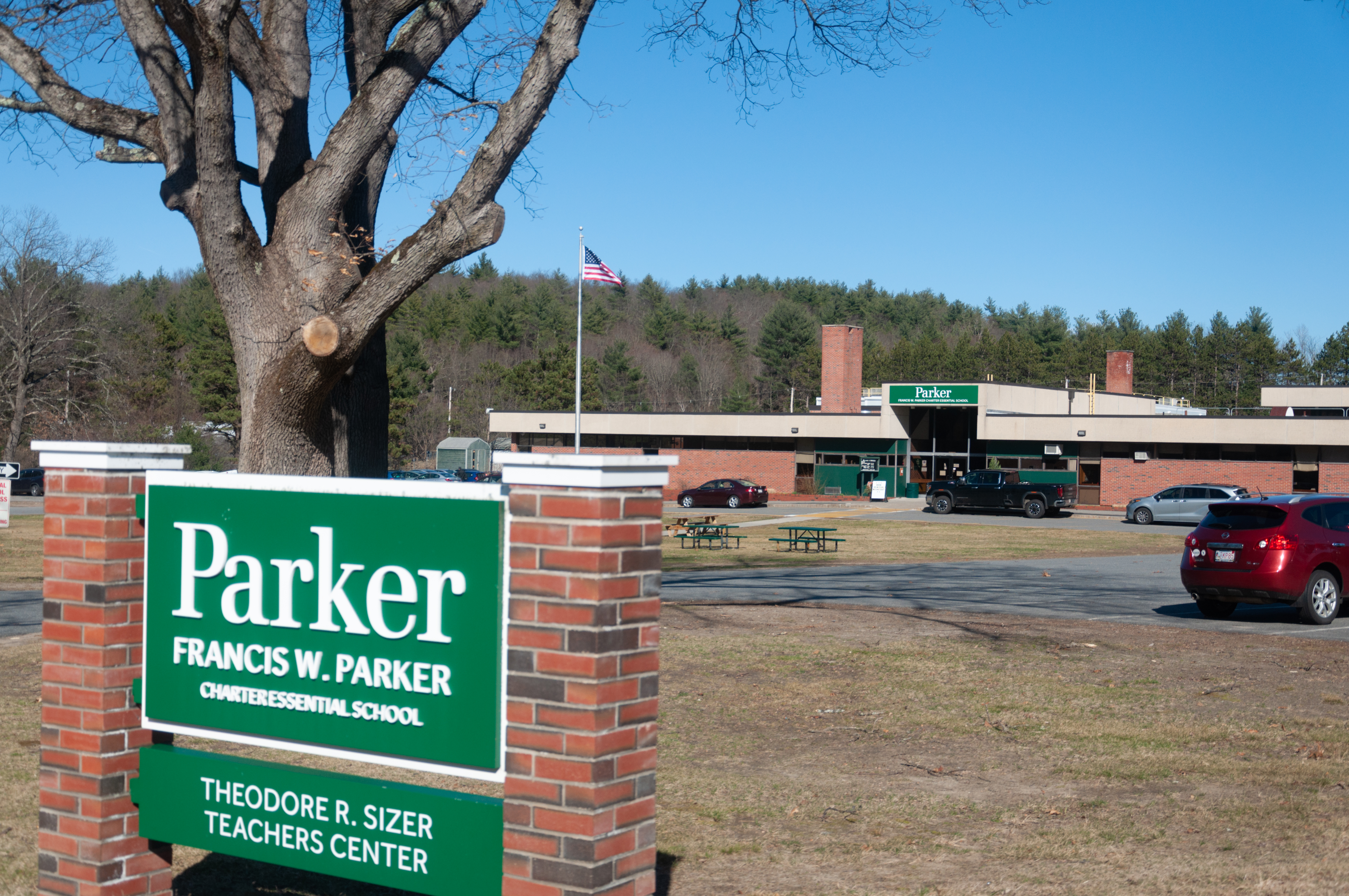
- 49 Antietam St. Devens, Massachusetts; 01434; United States

Information
- Type: Charter school
- Established: 1995
- Chair: Pam Gordon
- Staff: 43
- Grades: 7-12
- Enrollment: 379
- Colors: Green, white and black
- Athletics: MIAA
- Athletics conference: Central Massachusetts Athletic Conference
- Sports: Ultimate Frisbee, Volleyball, basketball, cross country, soccer, softball, track and field
- Mascot: Panther
- Nickname: Parker
- Website: www.theparkerschool.org

The Francis W. Parker Charter Essential School (usually referred to as the Parker Charter School by the public, or simply Parker by students) is a public charter school in Devens, Massachusetts, United States that serves students in grades 7 to 12. It was established in 1995 under the Massachusetts Education Reform Act of 1993, and serves about 400 students from 40 surrounding towns in north central Massachusetts, including Ayer, Shirley, Littleton, Leominster, Lunenburg, and Worcester. As a member of the Coalition of Essential Schools, a leading organization for education reform, Parker is known for its nontraditional educational philosophy. The school takes its name from Francis Wayland Parker, a 19th-century pioneer of the progressive school movement.

== History ==
Parker was one of the first charter schools created under the Massachusetts Education Reform Act of 1993. Started by area parents and teachers, it received its charter on March 15, 1994, opening for the 1995–1996 school year as an Essential School dedicated to the principles of the Coalition of Essential Schools. CES founder Ted Sizer was involved in its founding, and he served as co-principal with his wife Nancy in the 1998–1999 school year. Every five years the school is reviewed by the state to see whether the school's charter should be renewed. Parker's charter was renewed in 2014. In 1999, the New England Association of Schools and Colleges selected Parker as a "candidate member school" for accreditation, and it was accredited in 2002.

Parker also is home to the Regional Teachers center (renamed the Theodore R. Sizer Teachers Center on the school's tenth anniversary in 2005). Teachers provide professional help to other teachers, give workshops, and take part in educational conferences. The New Teachers Collaborative is a program that allows beginning teachers to earn their teacher certification in one school year. In addition to Parker, NTC places teachers at Innovation Academy Charter School in Chelmsford, Massachusetts.

As with all Commonwealth Charter Schools in Massachusetts, Parker receives its funding from the local aid accounts of its students' sending school districts. Because Massachusetts charter schools cannot receive state or local funding for facilities acquirement or improvement, Parker has had to find other solutions to its housing issues. From its opening in 1995 to 2000, Parker was located in a former Army spy-training building leased from MassDevelopment, a semi-private base redevelopment authority. While this facility provided sufficient space, it lacked windows, a cafeteria, or a gym. In 2000, the school moved to its current residence, a 1950s-era elementary school, also leased from MassDevelopment, until it was acquired in August 2007.

== Principals ==
- James Nehring (1996–1998)
- Theodore and Nancy Sizer (1998–1999)
- Gregg Sinner (1999–2001)
- Teriann Schrader (2001–2010)
- Diane Kruse (Interim Principal 2010-2011)
- Todd Sumner (2011–2022)
- Brian Harrigan (2022–2025)
- Bex Wilusz (2025–Present)

== Notable faculty ==
- Suzy Becker (born 1962), author, entrepreneur, and social activist

== Extracurricular activities ==
Parker has numerous clubs and activities. There is a student jazz band and there have several student bands over the years, most notably The Demons of Stupidity, Schmendrique, Crevice, Federal Meat Inspection, and Cageboys (stylized as "cageboys"). Every year Parker had multiple teams compete in CoMap a 36-hour math competition. In 2016 a CyberPatriot team was approved. Several times a year, there is a student run Open Mic night, Coequally known as "Cafe Wednesday". There are usually about two play productions a year. Parker also had a Destination ImagiNation team. Other groups include a Mock Trial team and a rocket club that reached the 2006 and 2007 national finals of the Team America Rocketry Challenge. In the past, there was a math team that participated in the Worcester County Mathematics League.

=== Athletics ===
Athletics have become an important part of the Parker identity over time. The school now fields teams in cross country, track and field, soccer, basketball, baseball, and softball and is a member of the Massachusetts Interscholastic Athletic Association. About half of the student body participates in at least one sport. Parker also has a cross country program. They compete in the Central Massachusetts Athletic Conference.
