= Worcester Technical High School =

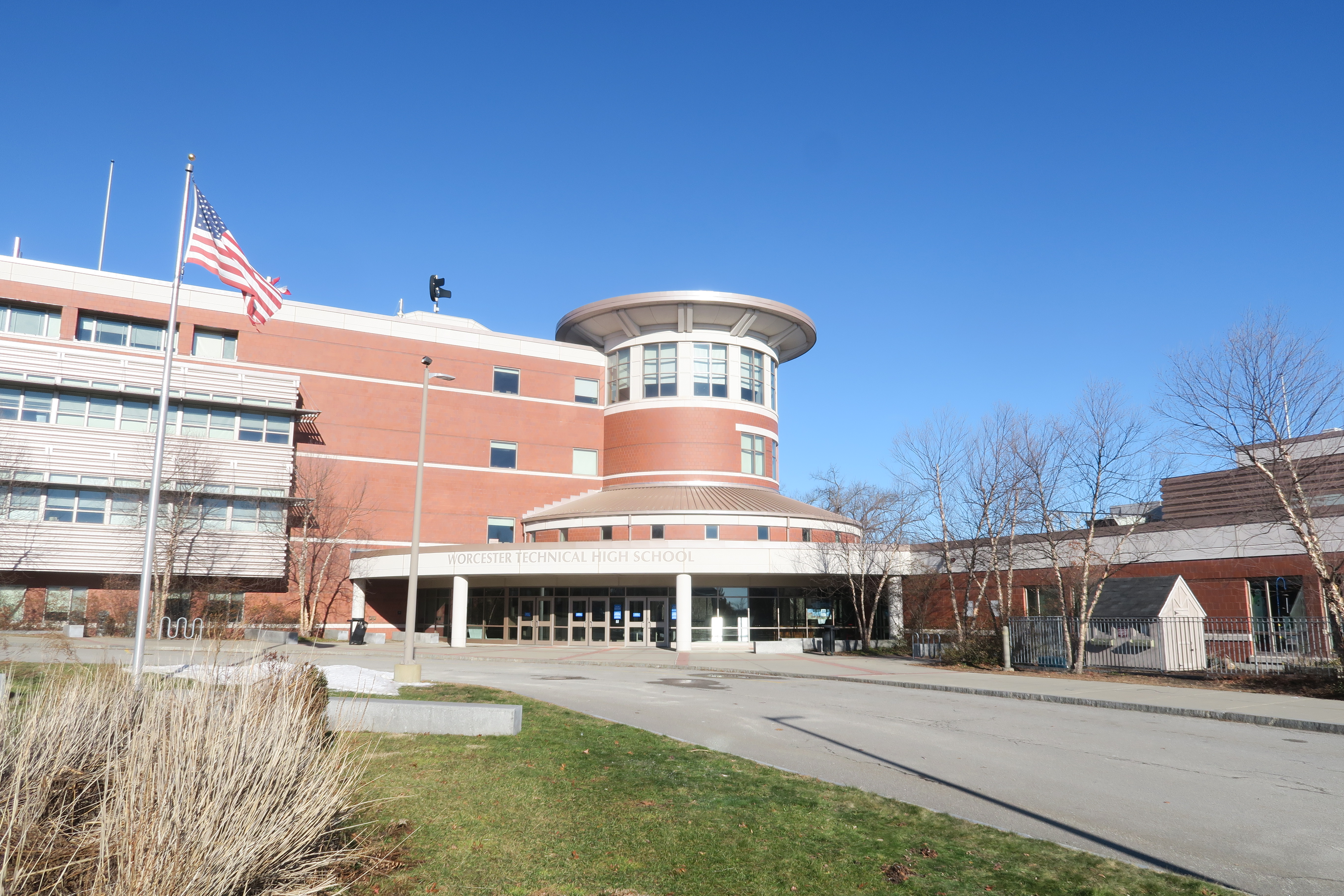
- Worcester Technical High School

Location
- 1 Officer Manny Familia Way; Worcester, Massachusetts 01605; United States; 42°16′36″N 71°46′41″W

Information
- Type: Public; Vocational school Open enrollment
- Motto: The School That Works
- Established: c. 1908
- School district: Worcester Public Schools
- CEEB code: 222550
- Principal: Drew Weymouth
- Teaching staff: 118.75 (FTE)
- Grades: 9 to 12
- Enrollment: 1,439 (2023–2024)
- Student to teacher ratio: 12.12
- Colors: Royal blue, silver and white
- Athletics conference: Central Massachusetts Athletic Conference
- Sports: Cross country, field hockey, American football, volleyball, basketball, baseball, softball, track, golf
- Mascot: Eagle
- Nickname: Voke, Tech High, Worcester Tech
- Team name: Eagles
- Website: www.techhigh.us

Worcester Technical High School (WTHS) is a vocational-technical high school, part of Worcester Public Schools district in Worcester, Massachusetts, United States. It opened on August 28, 2006, replacing the old Worcester Vocational High School (formerly known as Worcester Boys' Trade High School from 1909 to about 1975) at 2 Grove Street.

== School history ==
The school was also known for a period as Worcester Vocational Technical High School (WVTHS) beginning around 1975. When the David Hale Fanning Trade School (commonly called "Girls' Trade" or DHFTS) in Worcester closed its Chatham Street premises some years later, the curriculum, staff and student body transferred to WVTHS. Since many new non-technical areas of study were added by the merging of the two schools, the word "Technical" was dropped from the school's name.

When the school moved to Green Hill, the name was once again changed to its current title of Worcester Technical High School.

In 2014, President Barack Obama gave a speech for the school's Commencement Ceremony.

== Principals ==
In 2013, then-principal Sheila Harrity was named National Principal of the Year by the National Association of Secondary School Principals. Kyle Brenner replaced Harrity as Principal in 2014, and he relieved this position in 2020. The school's former principal was Siobahn Petrella. She was the Principal for WTHS for 2 years who later resigned in 2022, The school's current principal is Drew Weymouth who once served as an assistant principal.

== Academics ==
Worcester Technical High School has 23 different trades from which students can choose, from the 4 different Academies – Alden Design and Engineering (Alden), Allied Health and Human Services (A.H./service), Coghlin Construction Academy (construction), Information Technology and Business Service (I.T.)

Students run a restaurant, salon, automotive service center, graphic print shop, and preschool, as well as a veterinary clinic in partnership with Cummings School of Veterinary Medicine.

Students attend academic classes for half the time, and technical classes the other half the time.

== Technical Areas ==
Worcester Tech offers 23 trade specialties grouped into 4 academies.

=== Alden Design and Engineering ===
- Advanced Manufacturing
- Auto-Collision
- Auto-Tech
- Drafting
- Robotics
- Welding

=== Allied Health and Human Services ===
- Allied Health
- Animal Science
- Biotechnology
- Cosmetology
- Early Education and Care
- Environmental Science

=== Coghlin Construction Technology ===
- Carpentry
- Electrical
- HVAC/R
- Painting and Design
- Plumbing and Pipe Fitting

=== Information Technology & Business Services ===
- Culinary Arts
- Finance and Marketing
- Graphic Communications
- Hospitality Management
- Information Support Services & Networking (ISS&N)
- Programming and Web Development

== Athletics ==
Varsity sports
Season	Boys	Girls
Fall	football, golf, cross country, crew, soccer	field hockey, volleyball, crew, soccer, cheerleading
Winter	basketball, ice hockey, swimming, indoor track and field, wrestling, skiing	basketball, ice hockey, swimming, indoor track and field, gymnastics, skiing, cheerleading
Spring	baseball, lacrosse, tennis, crew, outdoor track and field	softball, lacrosse, tennis, crew, outdoor track and field

== Notable alumni ==
- Tim Collins (2003–2007), Major League Baseball pitcher for the Kansas City Royals
- Bruno Haas, former Major League Baseball player (Philadelphia Athletics)
- David Naleski, United States Navy veteran, diesel mechanic, and trade union shop steward
- Stephen Nedoroscik, artistic gymnast, two-time Olympic medalist
