= Abby Kelley Foster Charter Public School =

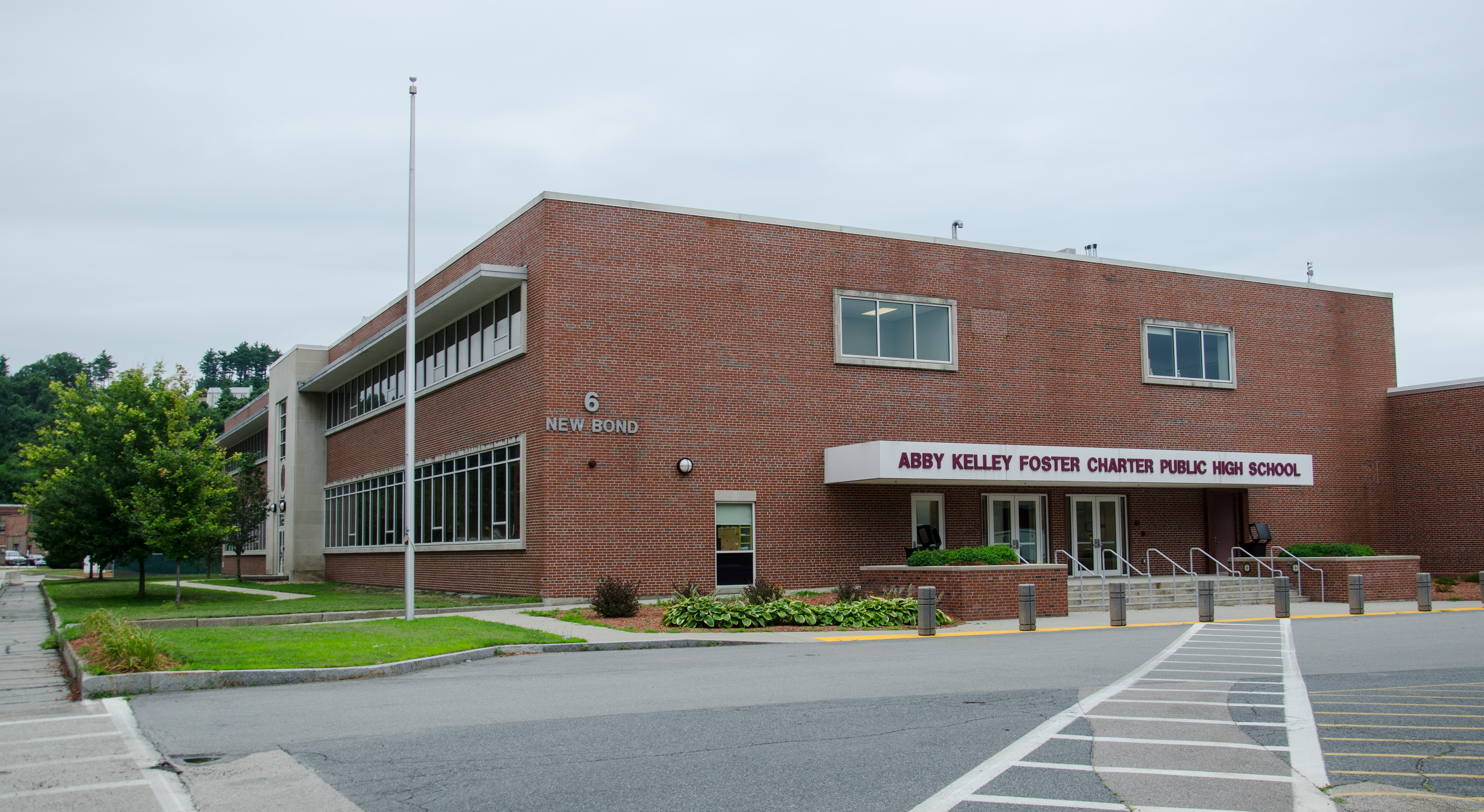
- High School Building

Location
- 10 New Bond Street; Worcester, Massachusetts 01606; United States; 42°18′20″N 71°48′6″W

Information
- School type: Charter
- Motto: "Scientia est Libertas" ("Knowledge is Freedom")
- Founded: 1998
- Status: Open
- School district: Abby Kelley Foster Charter Public School
- Director: Grace Howard-Donlin
- Principal: Robert Kerr (high school); Michael Cournoyer(middle); Ann Duke (elementary)
- Grades: K–12
- Age range: 5–18
- Enrollment: 1,426
- Average class size: 15 to 25 students
- Hours in school day: 7
- Campus: Elementary school, middle school, high school, elementary-middle gymnasium, athletic field, sports field, playground, Quinsigamond Community College (AKF College)
- Campus size: Medium
- Colors: Maroon & gold
- Athletics: Boys basketball, girls basketball, boys soccer, girls soccer, boys volleyball, girls volleyball, cheer-leading, cross country, baseball, softball, field hockey, track & field, football
- Athletics conference: Central Massachusetts Athletic Conference
- Mascot: Bears
- Nickname: Abby Kelley, AKF
- Website: www.akfcs.org

Abby Kelley Foster Charter Public School is a K–12 school located at 10 New Bond St., Worcester, Massachusetts, United States in former Heald Machine Company buildings. The school was founded in 1998.

== History ==
The school's namesake is Abby Kelley Foster, a noted 19th-century leader in abolitionist and women's rights movements who resided in Worcester.

On February 25, 2003, the Board of Education voted unanimously to renew the school's 5-year charter.

Theresa Andre is the first person to ever graduate from this school in 2006.

== Campus ==
Abby Kelley Foster started with Grades K-5 in a factory building. The middle and high school programs came later and are located in adjacent buildings. There are 3 buildings in this campus. The Elementary (K–3), Middle (4–7) and High School (8–12) buildings. They are located next to Kendrick Field which provided them with a great place to have field days, but in the year 2009 they transformed the old building next to it (including a parking lot) into a new playground and 2 athletic fields. They also made a high school. They made another old building into a full court gym for the Elementary and Middle Schools in 2008.

Due to overcrowding, the school leased space at Temple Emanuel for grades 6-8 during the 2002–2003 school year.

=== High school building ===
The school board decided to build a new high school. The building was bought from Norton Abrasives and was completely refurbished. During the construction of the school, students were temporarily put an old school building on Ararat Street. The building opened for the 2009–2010 school year and is still currently functional. The building was equipped with an auditorium, gymnasium (named James Walsh Gym after the head of the board of trustees), Cafeteria and Library. There was also the installation of a chemistry and biology lab plus a lecture hall. Adjacent to the auditorium and gym is a warehouse that the school uses for various storage and projects, such as the school play. More classrooms were built in the High school due to overcrowding during the 2016–2017 school year. They are now opened for the 2017–2018 school year.

=== Athletic facilities ===
During the building of the new high school in 2009, the school also turned an old storage building and an old playground into a new playground. The adjacent parking lots were also turned into one small athletic and one large mixed use field. The playground and both fields are covered in Astro-turf. There was also one building located next to the small field that was turned into a full court gym and is used by the Elementary and Middle School.

== Curriculum ==
Abby Kelley Foster focuses on reading, writing, math and music as key subjects for elementary students to be expanded upon in each grade level. The average student teacher ratio is 22:1.

The school also focuses on technology with curriculum beginning early with simple tasks progressing to the high school level with advanced topics on Microsoft Office, Adobe Photoshop and web design.

=== High school courses ===
Algebra, American British Literature, Anatomy and Physiology, Ancient Literature, Art, Visual Arts, Biology, Business Math, Calculus, Chemistry, Computer Science, Creative Writing, Civics, Earth Sciences, Forensics, Fundamental Chemistry, Geometry, Global Issues, Health/P.E., History of Film, Latin, Math Studies, Music, 20th-Century Music, Pre Calculus, Psychology, Spanish, Statistics, Technology, World Literature, U.S. History, World History, Writing Workshop

=== International Baccalaureate ===
For the 2010–11 school year the school was authorized to give International Baccalaureate diplomas to students who enroll in these excelled courses. These courses are offered to students of the Junior and Senior classes.

The current courses offered in IB are as follows:

- IB Group 1 Subjects
  - English SL
  - English HL
- IB Group 2 Subjects
  - Latin SL
  - Latin HL
  - Spanish SL
  - Spanish ab initio (SL)
- IB Group 3 Subjects
  - 20th Century History SL
  - 20th Century History & History of the Americas HL
- IB Group 4 Subjects
  - Biology HL
  - Environmental Systems and Societies SL
  - Physics SL
- IB Group 5 Subjects
  - Mathematics SL
  - Mathematical Studies (SL)
- IB Group 6 Subjects
  - Visual Arts SL
  - Music Composing (SL)
  - Music HL

Theory of Knowledge (required for all diploma students)

=== Test results ===
==== MCAS ====
As of 2007, Abby Kelley Foster shows mixed results in MCAS testing. Grade 3 tests show that 35% of students were proficient in English Language Arts arts while 17% of students were proficient in math. In 2004, Abbey Kelley Foster students scored 37% in English Language Arts and in 2006 (the year of last available data), scored 32% in math. This compares to state averages of 39% and 40%, respectively.

In grades 4–8, math results remain below the state average. The highest results come in grade 8 with 35% proficiency as compared to the state average of 45%. English Language Arts scores are higher, and in all but one case in grades 4–7 are above the state average. Grade 8 testing shows 82% proficiency. In science testing during grades 5 and 8, scores are 29% and 32% compared to the state averages of 41% and 35%, respectively.

Grade 10 testing shows proficiency well below the state average at 43% for English Language Arts and 60% as compared to 71% and 69%, respectively.

==== MCAS STE ====
The MCAS STE test, which measures proficiency in biology, chemistry, introductory physics and technology/engineering was measured at Abby Kelley Foster in the 58% in biology and 37% in technology/engineering as compared to the state averages of 42% and 35%. According to the Massachusetts Department of Elementary & Secondary Education, both ninth and tenth graders take the test, which will become a graduation requirement in 2010.

==== Advanced placement ====
During the 2006–2007 school year, Abby Kelley Foster participated in the Advanced Placement program by offering courses in the following areas: Biology, Government & Politics, US History, and World History. Students who do well on the final test in these subjects may be eligible for college credits.
