= Blackstone Valley Regional Vocational Technical High School =

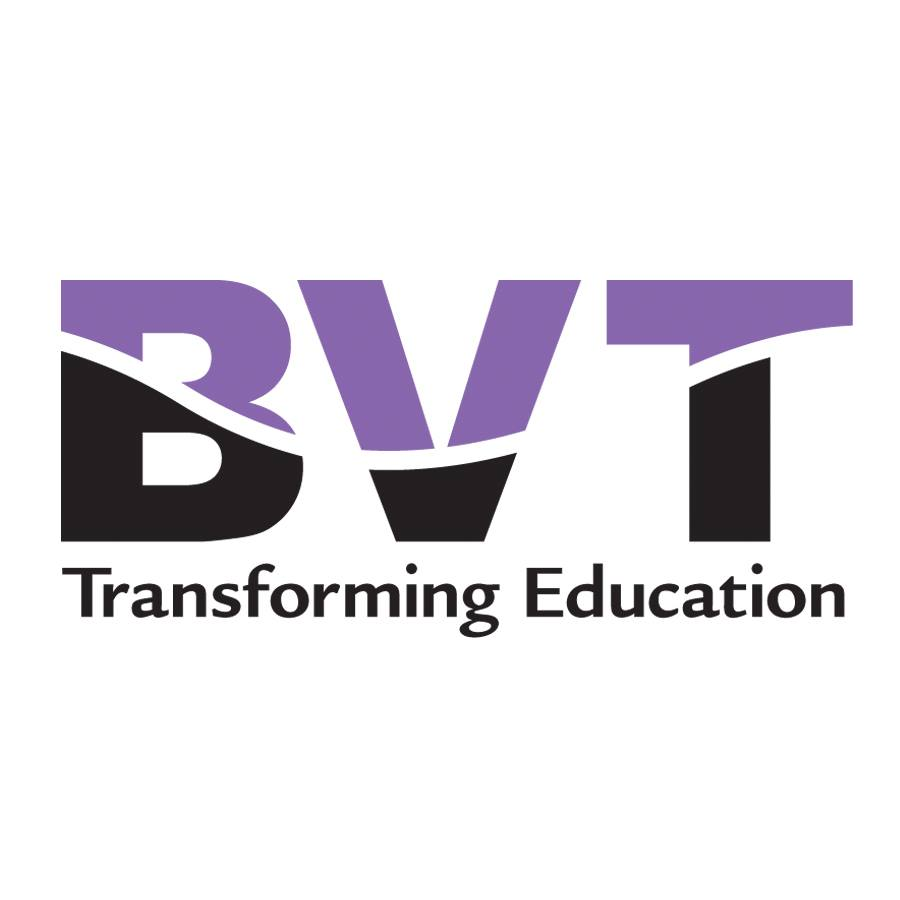

Location
- 65 Pleasant Street; Upton, MA 01568; United States
- Coordinates: 42.1633°N 71.6154°W

Information
- Type: Comprehensive Public High School
- Superintendent: Anthony E. Steele, II
- CEEB code: 222154
- Principal: Michele Denise
- Teaching staff: 110.5 (FTE)
- Grades: 9–12
- Enrollment: 1,243 (2024-2025)
- Student to teacher ratio: 11.2
- Colors: Purple, Black, White
- Athletics conference: Central Massachusetts Athletic Conference
- Mascot: Sporty the Beaver
- Rival: Nipmuc Regional High School
- Budget: $29,250,651.53 total $23,840.72 per pupil (2023)
- Communities served: Bellingham, Blackstone, Douglas, Grafton, Hopedale, Mendon, Milford, Millbury, Millville, Northbridge, Sutton, Upton, Uxbridge
- Website: www.valleytech.k12.ma.us

Blackstone Valley Regional Vocational Technical High School (BVT) is a technical high school in Upton, Massachusetts, serving the thirteen towns of the Blackstone Valley. The school was established in 1964. The school offers eighteen technical programs.

The original school colors were purple and gold.

== Demographics ==
According to Massachusetts Department of Elementary and Secondary Education annual statistics, for the 2024-2025 academic year, the demographic enrollment distributions for race, gender and grade level at Blackstone Valley Regional Vocational Technical High School are as follows:

Total number of enrolled students: 1,243
Total number of full-time equivalent educators: 110.5
Therefore, the student to teacher ratio for this school is 11.2:1

Enrollment by Race/Ethnicity (2024-2025)
Race	Enrolled Pupils*	% of District
African American	34	2.7%
Asian	25	2.0%
Hispanic	165	13.3%
Native American	0	0.0%
White	987	79.4%
Native Hawaiian, Pacific Islander	0	0.0%
Multi-Race, Non-Hispanic	32	2.6%
Total	1,243	100%

* Approximate number of enrolled pupils is calculated based on total number of students in district, multiplied by reported percentage, and rounded to nearest whole student.

Enrollment by gender (2024-2025)
Gender	Enrolled pupils	Percentage
Female	529	42.56%
Male	703	56.56%
Non-binary	11	0.88%
Total	1,243	100%

Enrollment by Grade
Grade	Pupils Enrolled	Percentage
9	314	25.26%
10	313	25.18%
11	301	24.22%
12	315	25.34%
SP*	0	0%
Total	1,243	100%

* SP = Special Education Beyond Grade 12

== Academics ==
BVT offers AP courses such as AP Chemistry, Spanish Language & Culture, Physics, English Literature & Composition, US History, Biology, Calculus, and Computer Science. Only 56% of students took an AP course and took the AP Test but only 51% of the students passed the test. Only 39% of the students have a passing rate, and only 28% have a quality adjustment participation rate.

== School district ==
The school serves thirteen towns in the Blackstone Valley:

- Bellingham
- Blackstone
- Douglas
- Grafton
- Hopedale
- Mendon
- Milford
- Millbury
- Millville
- Northbridge
- Sutton
- Upton
- Uxbridge

== Vocational programs ==
Blackstone Valley Tech offers eighteen vocational programs, called "shops":

- Advanced Manufacturing & Fabrication
- Automotive Collision Repair & Refinishing
- Automotive Technology
- Biotechnology
- Construction Technology
- Cosmetology
- Culinary Arts
- Dental Assisting
- Design and Media (Previously Multimedia Communications)
- Drafting & Design Technology
- Electrical
- Electronics & Engineering Technology
- Engineering & Robotics
- Health Services
- HVAC/R
- Information Technology
- Painting and Design Technology
- Plumbing

== Athletics ==
The BVT mascot is the Beavers. The BVT football team has won three state championships. The first state championship occurred on December 1, 2007, when BVT defeated Dean Tech 37–8 in the 3A Central-Western Massachusetts Super Bowl at Westfield State. The second state championship occurred on December 1, 2012, when BVT defeated Bay Path Regional Vocational Technical High School 6–0 in the Division 6 Central Massachusetts Super Bowl at Worcester State. The third state championship occurred on December 1, 2018, when BVT defeated St. Mary's of Lynn 18–0 in the Division 7 Massachusetts State Championship Game at Gillette Stadium. During the 2017 Football Season, BVT lost in the 2017 Massachusetts State Championship Game to Mashpee 22–16 at Gillette Stadium. During both the 2017 and 2018 BVT Football Seasons the Beavers played in honor of their defensive line coach Derek Yancik, who died on May 14, 2018, after a long battle with pancreatic cancer. Before being diagnosed with cancer, Coach Yancik had been a long-time member of the BVT Football coaching staff and also served as an HVAC Shop teacher at BVT.

== Notable alumni ==
- Shawn Wilkins (2012), football player who played in Germany
- Payton Linnehan (2019), soccer player for Portland Thorns FC, represents United States internationally

== See also ==
- List of high schools in Massachusetts
