= Doherty Memorial High School =

Coordinates: 42°16′13.16″N 71°49′14.89″W

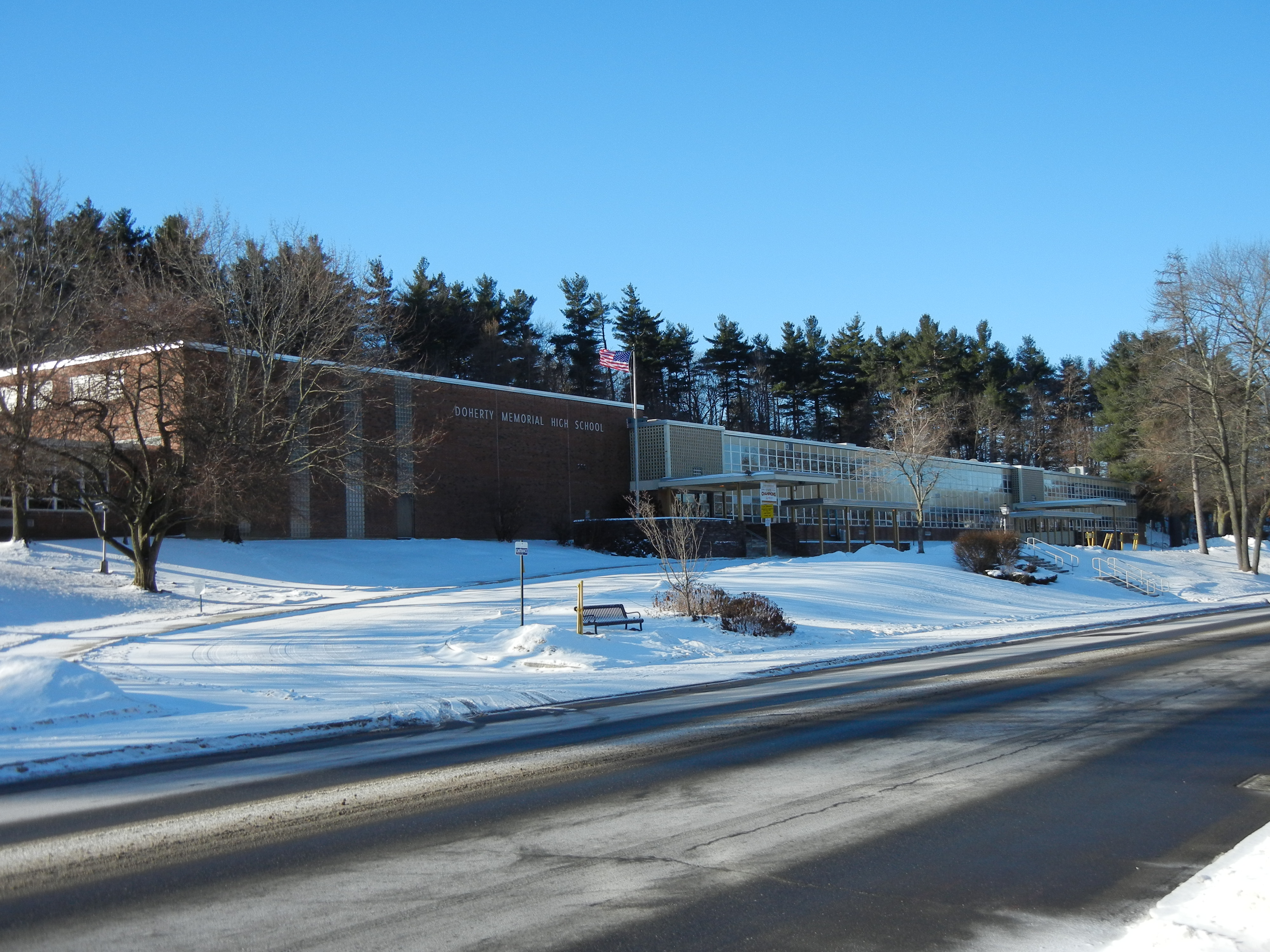
- 299 Highland Street; Worcester, Massachusetts 01602-2193; United States

Information
- Type: Public; Open enrollment
- Established: 1966 rebuilt 2024
- School district: Worcester Public Schools
- CEEB code: 222492
- Principal: John Staley
- Staff: 103.66 (on FTE basis)
- Grades: 9 to 12
- Enrollment: 1,398 (2023–2024)
- Student to teacher ratio: 13.49
- Colors: Maroon and gold
- Athletics conference: Central Massachusetts Athletic Conference
- Mascot: Highlanders
- Nickname: Home of the Highlanders
- Rival: Burncoat High School
- Website: www.worcesterschools.org/o/dmhs

Doherty Memorial High School is a public high school located in Worcester, Massachusetts, United States. It opened its doors in the fall of 1966, replacing two closing schools: Worcester Classical High School and Worcester Commerce High School.

The school was named for Dr. Leo T. Doherty, an educator, who, over a period of forty years, served Worcester as a teacher, art director, assistant superintendent, and superintendent of schools.

The school has about 1,400 students in grades 9 to 12 in the Worcester Public Schools district. The school's principal is John Staley. The school offers 24 AP courses, with more available through Virtual High School. The school serves the west side (Pleasant & Chandler Street, Tatnuck Square, Salisbury Street, Forest Grove, Newton Square, and June, Mill, Pleasant, and May Streets neighborhoods) of Worcester.

The original building was demolished in June 2024. A new, 425,000-square-foot facility opened in August 2024. The site of the former high school will be used for parking lots and an athletic complex.

== Competitive teams ==
Doherty Memorial High School has varsity teams in math and these sports: track, volleyball, baseball, lacrosse, football, cross country, soccer, field hockey, basketball, cheerleading, tennis, and FIRST Robotics.

The Doherty football team won the Massachusetts Division 4 State Championship at Gillette Stadium in 2013, defeating Dennis-Yarmouth by a score of 28–26.

== Notable alumni ==
- Donnie Demers, songwriter, musician
- Jimmy Demers, singer, songwriter
- Ned Eames (1978), professional tennis player
- David Greene (1981), university administrator
- Jeffrey Greene, real estate developer
- Wadeline Jonathas (2016), Olympic gold medalist
- Mary Beth Leonard (1980), U.S. Ambassador to Nigeria
- Keith Reed (1996), former MLB player (Baltimore Orioles)
- Edwin Rodríguez, boxer
- Sam Seder (1984), comedian, writer, actor, film director, television producer-director, and talk radio host
- Scott Silver, Screenwriter, Director - 8 Mile, The Fighter, Joker
- Yawin Smallwood (2010), NFL player (2014 Tennessee Titans practice squad)
- Doug Stanhope (did not graduate), comedian
- Isaac Yiadom (2014), NFL player
- Four Year Strong, pop-punk band
