= Time to Succeed Coalition =

Defunct American non-profit organization

- Merged into: Education Redesign Lab
- Founded: May 10, 2012
- Founder: Chris Gabrieli & Luis Ubiñas
- Dissolved: October 2018
- Type: Education non-profit
- Purpose: Education reform
- Location: Boston, Massachusetts, United States
- Method: Advocacy and coalition building
- Website: Website archive

The Time to Succeed Coalition (TSC) was an American non-profit organization working to promote expanded learning time to encourage student achievement and success. It was a partnership between the National Center on Time & Learning and the Ford Foundation between its foundation in 2012 until September 2018, when TSC announced via Facebook that it was merging into Harvard University's Education Redesign Lab.

== History ==
The Time to Succeed Coalition (TSC) launched on May 10, 2012 with the purpose of redesigning the K-12 academic year and promoting expanded learning time. The coalition was formed following the American Recovery and Reinvestment Act of 2009 which in part invested in public education. More than 100 signatories were part of its foundation, including Randi Weingarten, Dennis Van Roekel, Linda Darling-Hammond, Geoffrey Canada, Wendy Kopp, Charles M. Payne, Kathleen McCartney, Rahm Emanuel, Thomas Menino, John Deasy, Michael Bloomberg, Dennis Walcott, Paul Reville, John King, Jr., Wade Henderson, Peter Lynch, Reed Hastings, and Eli Broad. TSC was co-chaired by Chris Gabrieli, Chairman of the National Center on Time & Learning, and Luis Ubiñas, President of the Ford Foundation between 2008 and 2013.

In April 2013, they launched their first state coalition in Massachusetts. It claimed to have more than 85 signatories, including Matthew Malone. In May 2013, Gabrieli announced that in its first year, it had gained the support of 25,000 grassroots members and 200 signatories in the education, business, and policy sectors.
