= Darren Walker =

Nonprofit executive (born 1959)

- Born: August 28, 1959 (age 67); Lafayette, Louisiana, U.S.
- Education: University of Texas, Austin (BA, BS, JD)
- Occupation: President of the Ford Foundation
- Successor: Heather Gerken
- Partner: David Beitzel (died 2019)

Darren Walker (born August 28, 1959) was the 10th president of the Ford Foundation, a private foundation dedicated to human welfare, and President of the National Gallery of Art.

In June 2020, Walker led the Ford Foundation to issue a $1 billion designated social bond to stabilize non-profit organizations in the wake of COVID-19 pandemic. Walker is a member of the Reimagining New York Commission and co-chair of 2020 New York City Census. In October 2021, Walker announced that the Ford Foundation will no longer invest in "fossil fuels and seek opportunities to invest in alternative and renewable energy in the future"; including investing in "funds that address the threat of climate change, and support the transition to a green economy."

Before joining the Ford Foundation, Walker was vice president at the Rockefeller Foundation and COO of Harlem's Abyssinian Development Corporation. He co-founded both the US Impact Investing Alliance and the Presidents' Council on Disability Inclusion in Philanthropy. He is on many boards, including the National Gallery of Art, the High Line, the Smithsonian National Museum of African American History & Culture, Committee to Protect Journalists, Square, PepsiCo, and Ralph Lauren. Walker chaired the 2013 Gish Prize selection committee.

Previously, he served on the Board of Trustees at Carnegie Hall and Lincoln Center, the Board of Directors (as Vice-Chairman) at the New York City Ballet,, and the International Council of the Museum of Modern Art.

Earlier in his career, Walker worked as a lawyer and investment banker. Walker is a fellow of the Institute for Urban Design, a member of the Council on Foreign Relations, and a board member of the Arcus Foundation, Rockefeller Philanthropy Advisors, Friends of the High Line, and the Foundation for Art and Preservation in Embassies. He has been a teacher of housing, law and urban development at the New York University School of Law and the Robert F. Wagner Graduate School of Public Service. He is co-chair of the New York Public Library Council. In 2018, Walker joined the board of directors of the Committee to Protect Journalists.

== Early life and education ==
A 2019 commencement address by Walker

Walker was born in a charity hospital in Lafayette, Louisiana. He was raised by a single mother, Beulah Spencer, in Texas, first in Ames and later in Goose Creek; and was one of the country's first children to benefit from the Head Start Program. Walker said that his background gave him "an understanding of the need for investment in human capital and the centrality of private philanthropy making a difference in human lives."

=== University of Texas ===
With financial support from a Pell Grant, Walker was admitted to the University of Texas at Austin. In 1982, he graduated with a Bachelor of Arts in Government and a Bachelor of Science in Speech Communication. Subsequently, in 1986, Walker graduated from the University of Texas School of Law.

== Career ==
Walker began his career in 1986, at the international law firm Cleary, Gottlieb, Steen & Hamilton. In 1988, he joined Union Bank of Switzerland (UBS) and spent seven years in its capital markets division.

In 1995, Walker left the corporate world to spend a year volunteering at a school in Harlem. He went on to become the chief operating officer at Abyssinian Development Corporation, a community development organization also located in Harlem. There, he was able to draw on his private sector experience to advance redevelopment in Harlem, including the opening of a Pathmark supermarket in 1999 at 125th Street and Lexington Avenue. Also, Walker led the development of the first public school built in New York City by a community organization.

From 2002 to 2010, Walker was vice president for Foundation Initiatives at the Rockefeller Foundation, where he oversaw a wide range of programs in the United States and internationally. Also, at the Rockefeller Foundation, he led recovery program in the South of the US after Hurricane Katrina.

He joined the Ford Foundation in 2010 as vice president for Education, Creativity and Free Expression, one of the foundation's three major program areas. He also oversaw the Ford Foundation's regional programming in four offices based in Africa and the Middle East. Amongst other achievements, as the Ford Foundation's vice president for Education, Creativity and Free Expression, Walker was a creative and servant leadership driving force behind initiatives such as JustFilms - one of the largest documentary film funds in the world - with the goal of advancing "social justice worldwide through the talent of emerging and established filmmakers"; as well as championing public-private collaborations such as ArtPlace, which supports cultural development in cities and rural areas in the United States. Walker was also instrumental to saving American Folk Art Museum from going under because of the museum's dire financial straits, declaring that the museum is "a powerful showcase of the American spirit and an important public treasure for the people of our city."

=== Rockefeller Foundation ===
On July 20, 2006, Judith Rodin, president of the Rockefeller Foundation, announced that Walker would be the foundation's vice president for initiatives in the United States and internationally. Rodin said: "Darren Walker's leadership has been critical to the Rockefeller Foundation's program strategy development, to advancing some of the Foundation's flagship programs, and, most recently, to our efforts to help break the planning logjam in New Orleans. We're energized by the opportunity to have Darren play a wider role in leading the Foundation." He took office on August 1, 2006.

Walker led the Rockefeller Foundation's work in the United States and globally in supporting innovations that built economic development, sustainability, and assets for poor and disadvantaged people while also developing long-term responses to increasing migration and urbanization. He oversaw the foundation's evolving strategy and vision for New York City, as well as its role in rebuilding New Orleans.

Concerning Katrina, Walker reflected that:

The Hurricane Katrina experience provides a teachable moment to examine our expectations of each other as citizens. We believe that Teachers College has the expertise and experience to translate Spike Lee's masterful film into a curriculum for students to explore issues of race, class, poverty and democracy in America.

On his appointment as vice president, Walker remarked:

I deeply appreciate the confidence shown in me by this appointment, and I look forward to extending the exciting work we have under way at the Rockefeller Foundation. Judy Rodin's leadership, the team we are assembling, and the very promising strategic review we're completing convince me that an exciting new era for the Rockefeller Foundation lies just ahead.

Joining Mayor Michael Bloomberg, Walker led the Rockefeller Foundation to fund "a new Conditional Cash Transfer Learning Network which will share New York City's experience designing and implementing Opportunity NYC, the nation's first conditional cash transfer (CCT) program, as well as to continue learning from other countries and US cities about incentive-based poverty reduction programs." About the Network, Walker said: "As a global foundation, the Rockefeller Foundation has a keen interest in finding poverty-fighting models that work in different contexts around the world. The Foundation is proud to be a lead funder of Opportunity NYC, and we see the CCT learning network as an important means to further our investment in this groundbreaking pilot program."

Earlier, from 2002, Walker served as the Rockefeller Foundation's working communities program director; where he oversaw a grant making portfolio, in excess of US$25 million per year, that created anti-poverty strategies focusing on education, employment, sustainable community development, and democracy building in the United States. Bearing his mind on Walker's hiring, Sir Gordon Richard Conway, then president of the Rockefeller Foundation, said:

Darren Walker has proven experience tackling many of the critical needs of low-income communities and families, such as affordable housing, job creation and better schools. As the Foundation strives to foster greater equity and create healthy, working communities globally, we look forward to Darren playing a vital role on our leadership team.

=== Ford Foundation ===
Having been named president of the Ford Foundation in June 2013, Walker later assumed office in September 2013, succeeding Luis Ubiñas. In his earliest comments after becoming president of the Ford Foundation, Walker pledged to uphold the longstanding "advancement of human welfare" mission of the foundation, including its social justice and fairer world angle:

Leading this institution is the opportunity of a lifetime, and I am so very honored and humbled. I pledge to work with energy and integrity, to lead while listening and learning, and to give my all in service of our mission: to build a world that is fairer and more just.

Also, at a meeting with Ford Foundation staff titled: "What should we help build next?", Walker said:

Whatever we help the social justice visionaries of this generation to build next—at its foundation will be our staff. Because, like those who came before them and those who will follow, they are passionate about this place and its mission, and the enduring legacy we leave. In this way, one of the most indispensable elements of our culture is stewardship across generations. We're not just stewards of what we've helped build, but of the hard work and intellectual rigor of our predecessors. Together, we are part of an unbroken chain of commitment to social justice that reaches back to our earliest years and stretches far ahead of us. What a thrill to recognize the power inherent in that inter-generational bond.

In a December 2013 interview by New America Media, Walker talked about his opportunity to make the United States a better country for Americans and humankind, globally through his servant leadership at the Ford Foundation:

I have a chance to make a difference by leading a remarkable institution committed to human welfare and social justice when the very notion of social justice is being contested. Our country's policies and discourse sometimes feel retrograde, taking us back to when justice was more rationed; particularly for low-income people and people of color. I have a huge opportunity to fortify those voices. We made great progress in poverty reduction, employment for low income and low skill workers, in increased participation in higher education and high school graduate rates. When I hear, 'Oh, the War on Poverty was a waste of time,' I don't accept that. You have a hard time convincing me that investments in human capacity and in the potential of people like me to advance in society have somehow been for naught.

To support climate action, earth's health, green economy plus renewable energy; and "to harness the full power of Ford Foundation's assets in the fight for a more just and fair world", Walker stated, in October 2021, that the Ford Foundation will divest investments from fossil fuels. Notably, Walker announced, as follows:

Going forward, Ford Foundation's endowment will not invest in any fossil-fuel-related industries. With our endowment, our strategy is twofold: First, we commit to not doing harm. Consequences are too great to justify any additional investments in fossil-fuel industries. Second, no less important, we will look for opportunities to invest in enterprises and funds that are fueling new technologies and capabilities, contributing to a renewable sector that is strong, diverse, and varied enough to sustain a green-energy economy.

Under Walker's leadership, the Ford Foundation became the first non-profit organization to issue a $1 billion earmarked social bond in US capital markets for proceeds to strengthen and stabilize non-profit organizations affected by COVID-19.

Walker will leave the Ford Foundation at the end of 2025.

=== Operation Detroit ===
Walker led efforts to save the Detroit Institute of Arts and city workers' pensions in the Detroit bankruptcy process. Walker stated that it was "unprecedented and monumental for philanthropies to undertake this kind of initiative, but if there was ever a time when philanthropy should step up, this is it." Of Detroit's $18 billion in debts, Walker's Ford Foundation pledged to provide $125 million, and either other foundations contributed a sum of $205 million. The contribution would relieve the city-owned Detroit Institute of the Arts from having to sell some of its collection.

The foundations explained their investments as an attempt to "bolster the spirit of positive engagement and creativity in Detroit."

=== Expanded learning time ===
With the National Center on Time & Learning and the governors of Colorado, Connecticut, Massachusetts, New York, and Tennessee, Walker and the Ford Foundation contribute to a public education initiative called TIME Collaborative. The initiative invests in expanded learning time.

=== Presidency of the National Gallery of Art ===
In October 2024, Walker was named president of the National Gallery of Art. He had been a member of the board of trustees for five years, and succeeded Mitchell Rales.

== Recognition ==
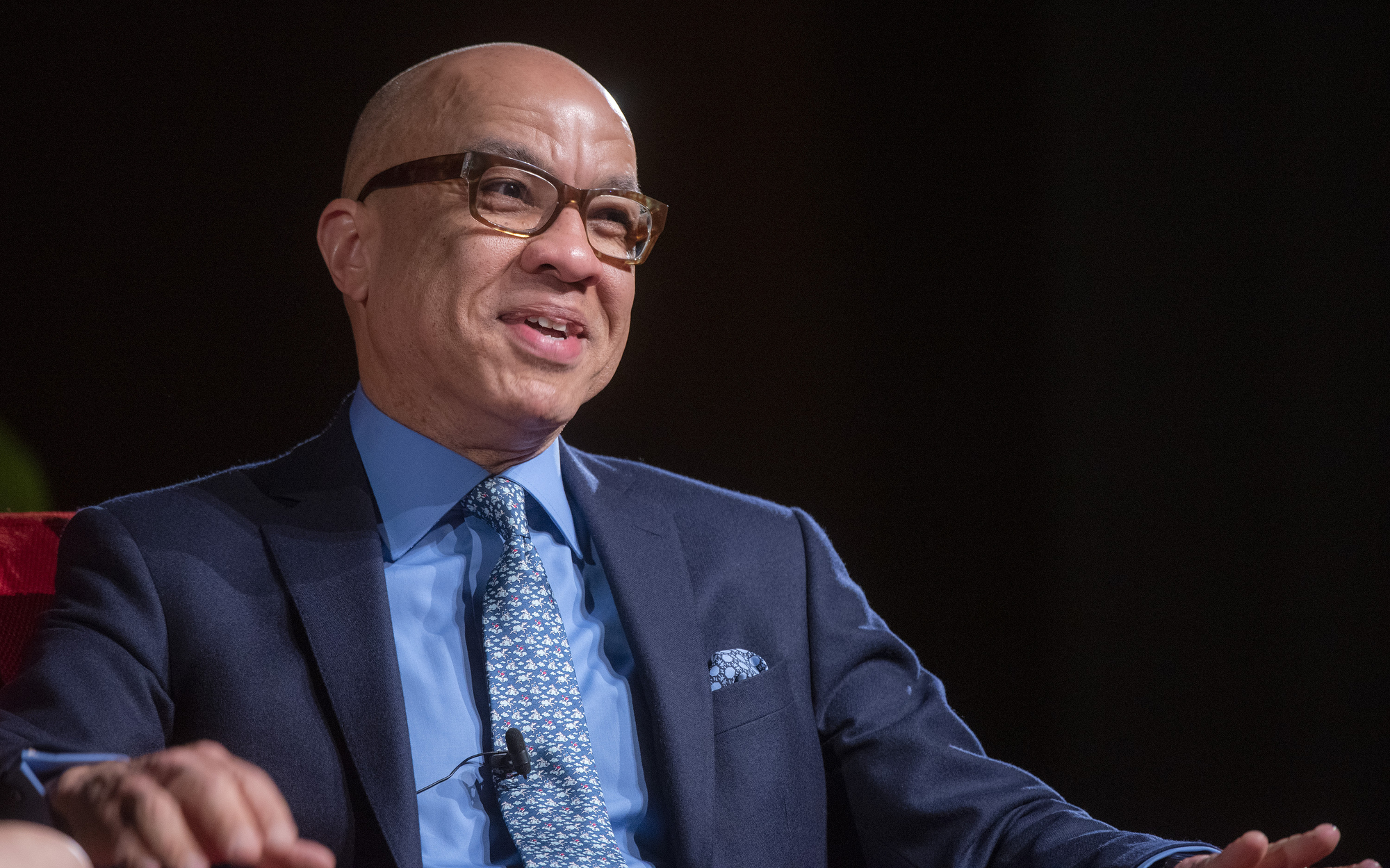
Walker at the LBJ Presidential Library in 2020

- Robert F. Kennedy Human Rights 2025 Ripple of Hope Award.
- NEH 2023 National Humanities Medal
- The Wall Street Journal's 2020 Philanthropy Innovator
- Time magazine's annual 100 Most Influential People in 2016
- Rolling Stone's 25 People Shaping the Future in 2017
- Fast Company's Most Creative People in Business in 2017
- Ebony Power 100 in 2014
- Out magazine's Power 50 in 2015

In July 2022, he was awarded as Honorary Officer of the Order of the British Empire (OBE), for "services to US/UK relations".

=== Commencement speeches ===
Walker has given commencement addresses for:

- Miami Dade College medical campus in 2014
- University of Texas at Austin in 2015
- Hunter College, City University of New York in 2016
- New York University in 2016
- Queens College, City University of New York in 2016
- Oberlin College in 2017
- Sarah Lawrence College in 2018
- Hamilton College in 2018
- University of Vermont in 2019
- Amherst College in 2019
- Bennington College in 2021
- Prairie View A&M University in 2022

== Personal life ==
Walker is gay. His partner of 26 years, David Beitzel, died in 2019 from heart failure.

== Works by Darren Walker ==
- By the People: Designing a Better America by Cynthia Smith (2016, introduction by Walker), published by Cooper Hewitt, ISBN 9781942303145
- Giving Done Right: Effective Philanthropy and Making Every Dollar Count by Phil Buchanan (2019, foreword by Walker), published by PublicAffairs, ISBN 9781541742253
- The Living Legacy of W. McNeil Lowry; Vision and Voice edited by Frank Kessel (2020, foreword by Walker), published by Peter Lang Us, ISBN 9781433169656
- Power to the Public: The Promise of Public Interest Technology by Tara Dawson McGuinness and Hana Schank (2021, afterword by Walker), published by Princeton University Press, ISBN 9780691207759
- Designing Peace: Building a Better Future Now edited by Cynthia Smith (2022, preface by Walker), published by Cooper Hewitt, ISBN 9781942303329
- From Generosity to Justice: A New Gospel of Wealth (2023), published by Disruption Books, ISBN 9781633310773
