= Matthew Malone =

American educator

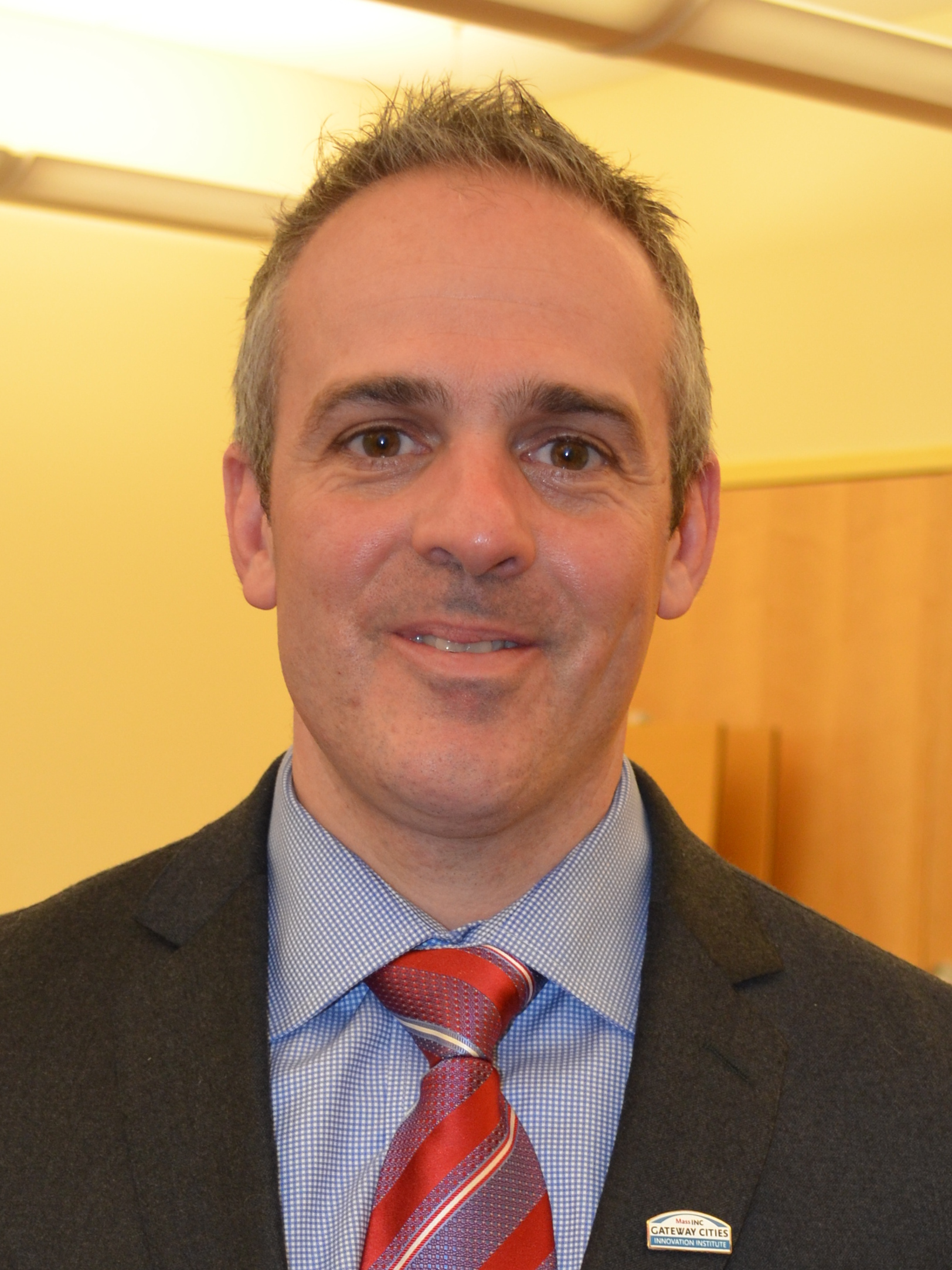
- Malone in 2013

Superintendent of Fall River Public Schools
- In office 2016–2021
- Preceded by: Meg Mayo-Brown
- Succeeded by: Maria Pontes (Interim)

Interim Superintendent of Saugus Public Schools
- In office 2015–2016
- Preceded by: Michael Tempesta
- Succeeded by: Mike Hashem (acting)

Massachusetts Secretary of Education
- In office January 14, 2013 – January 8, 2015
- Governor: Deval Patrick
- Preceded by: Paul Reville
- Succeeded by: James Peyser

Superintendent of Brockton Public Schools
- In office 2009–2012
- Preceded by: Basan Nembirkow
- Succeeded by: Kathleen A. Smith

Superintendent of Swampscott Public Schools
- In office 2005–2009
- Preceded by: Carol Sager (interim)
- Succeeded by: Lynne Celli

Personal details
- Education: Suffolk University; Boston College

Matthew H. Malone is an American educator who served as the superintendent of Fall River Public Schools from 2016 until 2021. Malone is also the former Massachusetts secretary of education.

== Early life and education ==
Malone grew up in Newton Upper Falls, Massachusetts. During his youth he was diagnosed with dyslexia. At the age of 17, he enlisted in the United States Marine Corps. Malone served in the Marine Corps Reserve for eight years, as a Field Radio Operator within an infantry battalion, the 1st Battalion 25th Marine Regiment and received an honorable discharge with the rank of sergeant. Malone is a combat veteran of the 1991 Persian Gulf War. He earned a bachelor's degree in history from Suffolk University and a master's degree in secondary education and a doctorate in educational administration from Boston College.

== Early career ==
Malone began his teaching career in 1993 as a paraprofessional and substitute teacher in the Boston Public Schools. He then worked as a high school social studies teacher in Boston from 1995 to 1999 and middle school assistant principal in Duxbury, Massachusetts from 1999 to 2000. From 2000 to 2003 headmaster of Monument High School, a new high school created from the breaking up of the large South Boston High School.

From 2004 to 2005, Malone served as special assistant to the superintendent and instructional leader in the San Diego Unified School District. In this role he led the largest high school conversion (breaking up of a large high school into smaller schools) initiative in the country.

In 2005, Malone returned to Massachusetts as Swampscott, Massachusetts' superintendent of schools. In 2008, he informed the Swampscott school committee that he did not intend to renew his contract when it expired in 2010, citing a desire to return to an urban school district. Malone was a finalist for the superintendent's positions in Worcester and Springfield, Massachusetts.

== Brockton ==
On June 23, 2009, the Brockton school committee voted 4 to 3 to hire Malone as superintendent of Brockton Public Schools.

During Malone's tenure as superintendent, he had to cut $12 million from the department budget and lay off almost 150 employees. Student performance at the high school and middle school level improved, but elementary school MCAS test lagged.

At Malone's 2012 annual review, the school committee gave him a composite score of 2.77 out of 5. On November 7, 2012, Malone and the Brockton School Committee agreed to end his contract early. The early termination did not include a buyout or severance package. Both Malone and the school committee stated that the city's residency requirement contributed to his departure.

== Secretary of education ==
On December 13, 2012, Governor Deval Patrick announced that Malone would replace Paul Reville as state education secretary. He was sworn into office on January 14, 2013. Malone led education in the Commonwealth for the Governor Patrick Administration focused on supporting students in classrooms, practitioners in the field, closing achievement gaps, and expanding opportunities for higher education.

== Post-secretary career ==
In December 2014, Malone announced that he was planning to do an unpaid internship as a butcher following the end of Deval Patrick's term as governor. He also did some volunteer work and interviewed for college presidency positions.

On October 8, 2015, the Saugus, Massachusetts school committee voted 3 to 2 to appoint Malone as interim superintendent. On February 5, 2016, attorneys for Malone and the school committee announced that Malone was resigning effective February 26 due to him and the committee having differing views on the role of a superintendent and the needs of the Saugus school system.

On June 22, 2016, the Fall River school committee appointed Malone as the district's superintendent. Malone led the Fall River Public Schools for over five years, leading the system through the COVID-19 pandemic and multiple school turnaround initiatives.

In September 2020, the school committee received multiple complaints of inappropriate behavior by Malone towards subordinates. Malone allegedly harassed and used epithets towards a school department staffer with disabilities and referred to female employees using inappropriate names. In January 2021, the school committee voted 4 to 2 not to terminate Malone, but voted to amend his contract to reduce his compensation and allow for termination under "certain circumstances". In 2022, the employee who was allegedly bullied and harassed by Malone settled his discrimination complaints with the city for $150,000. In June 2021, Malone announced his resignation as superintendent, effective November 1. Maria Pontes will serve as interim superintendent until a permanent replacement is installed. Malone currently works for the United States Department of Labor.

== Personal life ==
Malone resides in Roslindale and has two children. He is a registered Republican. In 2013, he and a Massachusetts Senate court officer stopped a domestic assault in Dorchester.
