= Chris Bender =

Chris Bender may refer to:

- Chris Bender (film producer) (born 1971), American film producer
- Chris Bender (singer) (1972–1991), American R&B singer
