= Charles Felix =

Charles Felix may refer to:

- Charles Felix of Sardinia (1765–1831), Duke of Savoy
- Charles Reis Felix (1923–2017), Portuguese-American writer
- Charles Félix Jean-Baptiste Camerata-Passionei di Mazzoleni (1826–1853), nephew of Napoleon
- Charles Warren Adams (1833–1903), pioneer writer of detective novels, used the pseudonym Charles Felix
- Charles Felix Smith (1786–1858), lieutenant-general, colonel commandant of the Royal Engineers
