= Expanded learning time =

Expanded learning time (ELT) is a strategy employed by schools in the United States to redesign their school days and/or years in order to provide students, particularly in communities of concentrated poverty, with substantially more and better learning time. ELT is often a core element of school improvement or turnaround efforts, such that other practices like teacher collaboration, data-driven instruction, and integrated enrichment can be more effectively implemented. ELT differs from associated efforts like after-school programs or expanded learning opportunities (ELOs) because ELT requires all students in a given school to attend the longer day and/or year, and the additional time becomes a dependent component of the school's educational practices and objectives.

== History of the United States public school calendar ==
The traditional public school calendar in the United States is an average of 180, 6.5-hour days across the year. Kindergarten and younger grades are 2.5 - 3 hours a day. The school year often begins in late August or early September and ends by early or mid-June. This norm emerged over the latter half of the nineteenth century, and while the states are still responsible for defining their mandatory hours and days, the majority of states have adopted something close to the traditional calendar.

A major catalyst for the development of the uniform school calendar was the creation of compulsory education. Before the American Civil War, publicly funded education existed; however, there was no requirement for children to attend school. Additionally these public schools had two distinct calendars: rural and urban. The rural calendar typically operated for at most six months of the year, with most school days taking place during the winter, giving credence to the belief that the current system is based on the agrarian calendar. On the other hand, the urban calendar was much longer, in some cases almost year-round, to correspond with the round-the-clock approach of the industrial sector

During the decades between the American Civil War and World War I, compulsory education became more widespread, as the economic incentive for developing an educated workforce grew. Massachusetts began the movement when, in 1852, it required youths aged 8–14 to attend at least 12 weeks of school; the requirement had increased to 32 weeks by 1902. New York was another leader in the compulsory education movement, passing a law in 1874 requiring youths aged 8–14 to attend school for 14 weeks; over the next 50 years, the requirement slowly increased, settling at 180 days by 1921. In both Massachusetts and New York, the number of days represented a compromise between the shorter instructional year of rural schools and the year-round availability of school in urban areas. Since about 1920, the traditional school year has become a legal and cultural norm.

== History ==
The argument for expanded learning time has been advanced on a national stage since the convention of compulsory education began to take hold. In 1894, U.S. Commissioner of Education William Torrey Harris published a report about the state of American public education in which he complained of the loss of time in urban school days from 193.1 to 191.

[T]he constant tendency [has been] toward a reduction of time. First, the Saturday morning session was discontinued; then the summer vacations were lengthened; the morning sessions were shortened; the afternoon sessions were curtailed; new holidays were introduced; provisions were made for a single session on stormy days, and for closing the schools to allow teachers ... to attend teachers' institutes ...

The boy of today must attend school 11.1 years in order to receive as much instruction, quantitatively, as the boy of fifty years ago received in 8 years ... It is scarcely necessary to look further than this for the explanation for the greater amount of work accomplished ... in the German and French than in the American schools ...

=== A Nation at Risk ===
Nearly one hundred years after Harris's report, the debate about the school calendar in America continued. On August 26, 1981, President Ronald Reagan's Secretary of Education T.H. Bell created the National Commission on Excellence in response to the "public perception that something is seriously remiss in our educational system". In 1983, the Committee released its report A Nation at Risk which added to the growing consensus that the American school system was failing. The Committee highlighted four areas of findings: content, expectations, time, and teaching. In the section "Findings Regarding Time" the commission made three observations:

(1) compared to other nations, American students spend much less time on school work; (2) time spent in the classroom and on homework is often used ineffectively; and (3) schools are not doing enough to help students develop either the study skills required to use time well or the willingness to spend more time on school work.

Specifically, the commission recommended that schools consider a 7-hour day and 200- to 220-day school year. In response to the report, states launched task forces, committees, and study groups to focus on the issue of the education system. Of the five recommendations from the report, learning time is the only recommendation where there has not been a significant change. Schools across the country largely still adhere to the traditional calendar.

=== Prisoners of Time ===
In the Education Council Act of 1991, President George H. W. Bush established the National Education Commission on Time and Learning, a nine-member commission charged with studying the impact of time on learning Three years later, in April 1994, the Commission published a report, Prisoners of Time, referencing Commissioner Harris's 1894 report and outlining inherent problems with the traditional school calendar

The commission argued that education is a top priority for the United States, citing public opinion polls and the bipartisan support for the Goals 2000, Educate America Act, which introduced eight broad and ambitious goals to improve the education system. In the report, the Commission highlighted how the constraints on learning time present a hurdle to achieve the targets laid out in the Goals 2000 Act. It then presented eight recommendations to correct the "design flaw" of traditional school calendars: I. Reinvent Schools around Learning, not Time

II. Fix the Design Flaw: Use Time in New and Better Ways

III. Establish an Academic Day

IV. Keep Schools Open Longer to Meet the Needs of Children and Communities

V. Give Teachers the Time They Need

VI. Invest in Technology

VII. Develop Local Action Plans to Transform Schools

VIII. Share the Responsibility

Partly in response to this report, the National Conference of State Legislatures included expanding learning time as an issue at its national conference in 1998. At that event, 14 states indicated they were considering bills to lengthen the school day and/or year. Since that time, however, the calendar of 180 6.5-hour school days has remained the norm.

=== Role of charter schools in the ELT movement ===
While both district public schools and state policy on school time have been slow to move away from the conventional calendar, the one sector of public education that has moved away from the standard more readily has been charter schools. Charter schools are public schools that are granted autonomy from traditional school districts while being held accountable for student outcomes. Charter schools have broken from the conventional school calendar in large part because, in most cases, charter schools are legally authorized to set their own operating hours. They take advantage of such flexibility to have longer schools day and a longer school year. About sixty percent of all expanded-time schools nationwide are charter schools.

=== Massachusetts ===
In 1993, the landmark Massachusetts Education Reform Act (MERA) created the framework for unprecedented improvements in students' learning, teachers' professionalism, school management, and equity of funding. As a result of MERA, 54 distinct activities were initiated by the then Department of Education to implement the Act In 1995, the First Annual Implementation Report was released, which separated the 54 activities into five goals and evaluated their impact on education throughout the Commonwealth. In the analysis of the first goal—to establish new standards and programs for students that ensure high achievement—the report concluded, "If schools are to meet the enormous demands of assisting students in meeting these new standards, it may become necessary to increase the amount of time that students spend directly involved in education." The legislature then charged the Board of Education to form the Massachusetts Commission on Time and Learning with a mandate to develop "a plan to extend the time during which students attend school to reflect prevailing norms in advanced industrial countries and to address the educational needs of children in the Commonwealth."

Following the report, the state took steps forward to advance the potential for schools to break from the traditional school calendar. Like other states, Massachusetts authorized the establishment of charter schools. By allowing the formation of schools that were granted the autonomy to design themselves as they saw fit, the legislature opened the door to a new wave of public schools that were not beholden to certain fixed policies related to school staffing or design, including the schedule. When the first fifteen charter schools were approved by the Board of Education in 1995, almost all of them featured some form of a longer school day and/or year.

Expanded time did not become a cohesive strategy, however, until 2005 when the legislature included funds for planning grants in the FY 2006 budget ($500,000), which allowed 20 districts to plan how they might use a state grant to expand their school calendar by 25 percent. A year later, the legislature introduced a new line-item in the state budget which allocated $6.5 million to participating schools at a rate of $1,300 per student to fund an expanded school day and/or year. So began the Massachusetts Expanded Learning Time Initiative, the country's first competitive grant program established for the express purpose of expanding learning time in traditional district schools.

Over the next few years, the MA ELT Initiative added a number of schools. In the 2012–2013 school year, 19 schools across ten districts added 300 hours to their school year through the ELT Initiative. No other state had attempted a similar grant program until January 2013 when New York Governor Andrew Cuomo proposed that his state implement a grant program modeled on the one in Massachusetts, which was passed by the Legislature in their 2013–2014 fiscal year budget in March 2013.

=== The TIME Act ===
The Massachusetts ELT Initiative also caught the eye of policymakers in Congress. In 2007, Sen. Ted Kennedy (D-MA) introduced a bill in the U.S. Senate called the Time for Innovation Matters in Education Act (TIME Act). This bill proposed to create a federal competitive grant program akin to the one that had already been in place in Massachusetts. A similar bill was reintroduced in 2009 by Senator Kennedy and then again in April 2011 by Senators Tom Harkin (D-IA), Jeff Bingaman (D-NM), Sherrod Brown(D-OH), Al Franken (D-MN), Michael Bennet (D-CO), and Kirsten Gillibrand (D-NY) with a House Bill introduced by Representatives Mike Honda (D-CA) and Steve Chabot (R-OH).

=== President Obama's administration ===
Both President Barack Obama and U.S. Secretary of Education Arne Duncan support redesigning the school calendar to increase learning time. As President Obama noted in an address in March 2009:

We can no longer afford an academic calendar designed for when America was a nation of farmers who needed their children at home plowing the land at the end of each day. That calendar may have once made sense, but today it puts us at a competitive disadvantage. Our children -- listen to this -- our children spend over a month less in school than children in South Korea -- every year. That's no way to prepare them for a 21st century economy. That's why I'm calling for us ... to rethink the school day to incorporate more time -– whether during the summer or through expanded-day programs for children who need it.

The administration has supported this agenda with additional funding. On February 17, 2009, President Obama signed into law the American Recovery and Reinvestment Act of 2009 (ARRA) Included in the Act was $3.5 billion for the School Improvement Fund, a program within the United States Department of Education that aims to "turn around" chronically low-performing schools. (This amount was in addition to $500 million that had been allocated to the Fund through regular budget appropriations.) By outlining the guidelines for the School Improvement program, the department explicitly named "increased learning time" as one of the key reforms schools must undertake in two of the models, 'transformation' and 'turnaround'. (Schools must also make large-scale staffing changes and implement robust tutoring and data systems.) This School Improvement Grant (SIG) program provided grants to a total of about 1,600 schools since 2010.)

=== Other local and state initiatives ===
==== Arizona ====
Arizona is the first and only state in the nation to incentivize an increase in the number of instructional days for school districts from the minimum required 180 days to 200. The state offers an increase of the base level funding by five percent for school districts that do choose to add 20 days to their school year. Since the creation of the incentive, three districts in Arizona have implemented the 200-day school year, Balsz, Riverside, and Nadaberg School Districts. Balsz School District has been implementing the longer school year for over three years and has experienced an increase in student achievement.

To build on that success, Arizona State Representative Paul Boyer (R-Phoenix) introduced HB 2488 in 2013. The bill called for increasing the additional funding to eight percent of a school's base level and would allow individual schools, including charter schools, to apply for funding in addition to whole school districts.

==== Chicago ====
In his campaign for mayor in spring 2011, Rahm Emanuel advocated for longer school days across the city. As he transitioned into the mayor's office after his election, Emanuel began to plan for how to increase the amount of time students are in school. After negotiations with the Chicago Teachers Union, the elementary school day was expanded from a 5.75-hour day to a 7-hour day. Although he campaigned originally for 7.5-hour day, Mayor Emanuel said, "The goal was not the time. The goal was the educational opportunity and the quality that went with it ... I would hope now that we'd stop debating about the time and start having a real discussion." In September 2012, Chicago Public Schools (CPS), the third largest school district in the United States, with over 400,000 students and 675 schools, expanded learning time for all of its schools through its Full School Day Initiative. As part of the agreement with the Chicago Teachers Union, the district added 477 new teaching positions and added $130 million in funding to give principals and school communities flexibility to structure the new school day.

While Full School Days are implemented differently at each school, with the additional time schools can provide the equivalent of an additional class period in math and English four days a week along with an additional enrichment or recovery options to ensure every student receives and education that will help them succeed.

For elementary schools the average day now includes:

- 20 additional minutes in reading
- 30 additional minutes in intervention with adaptive technology
- 15 additional minutes in math
- 10 additional minutes in enrichment
- 25 minutes of recess (previously students did not have time for recess)

==== The TIME Collaborative ====
The Ford Foundation and the National Center on Time & Learning (NCTL) joined to launch the TIME Collaborative on December 3, 2012, in Washington, D.C. Through the collaborative, select public schools in Colorado, Connecticut, Massachusetts, New York, and Tennessee will significantly expand and redesign their school calendars.

The states will use a mix of federal and state funding to cover the cost of adding 300 hours of instruction and enrichment to the school year, and will receive technical assistance from NCTL and capacity building grants from the Ford Foundation.

==== Current ELT schools ====
In December 2011, NCTL released a report Mapping the Field: A Report on Expanded-Time Schools in America that identified 1,002 expanded-time schools, serving 520,000 students in 36 states in the U.S. as of the 2011–2012 school year. To identify these schools, NCTL used set criteria from its expanded-time schools database, the only database of its kind. Schools included in its database must have a 7-hour school day and must add 30 minutes and/or 10 days more than surrounding public schools or the school's pre-conversion schedule.

Since the reporting and release of that report, Chicago Public Schools have undertaken their Full School Days Initiative. Across the 600 schools in Chicago, over 340,000 students have an expanded school day.

== Research on ELT ==
Both research and practice indicate that adding time to the school schedule can have a meaningfully positive impact on student achievement. Many researchers have studied the impact of time on learning and their research underscores a central point: that while more time in schools is valuable, time is a resource that must be used well to realize its full potential.

The evidence that quantity of learning time is a key modulator of student performance is available using three units of analysis: individual student, school, and system. On the individual level, one set of researchers investigating classrooms in California in the 1970s found that differences in the amount of engaged learning time among students accounted for nine percent of differences in student outcomes in elementary grades, a strong association in the field of education. Later, a series of experiments by one researcher determined a direct correlation between students' time spent studying a passage and their proficiency on a fact-based assessment, finding that the more time students spent studying the passage, the greater their performance in both the near term and after one week. An analysis of test scores in Illinois has validated that the more time individual students spent in reading and math class, the higher their scores in those subjects.

Among studies that have analyzed factors that contribute to differentials in student performance at the school level, learning time also emerges as one of the main correlates. One of the most pointed studies on this correlation is from a study of charter schools in New York City, which determined that quantity of instructional time (along with high-dosage tutoring, frequent feedback to teachers, and a culture of high expectations) account for up to 50 percent of the variation in outcomes among schools. A second study of charter schools in New York City found that a longer year was one of the strongest associations with higher student achievement.

On the system level, several studies have examined whether changes to instructional time have any effect on academic outcomes. An analysis of Maryland school over several years looked at the effect of snow days on test scores —in particular, lost school days due to inclement weather in school in the weeks leading up to the administration of state assessments—revealed that in those years when there were fewer snow days students performed better than in those years that had more than five snow days. A study of schools in Israel found that an increase in instructional time from one year to the next—the result of a re-financing plan that provided schools more resources—"positively impacts" test scores in English, science, and math tests, with some variation by subject and student socioeconomic status. In both these cases, then, adding more time to an otherwise fixed system equates with more learning.

As for studies that considered the effects of adding time to schools for the express purpose of improving educational outcomes, a meta-analysis examined 15 empirical studies of extended school days and/or years and found that adding time was, more often than not, associated with improved student outcomes, noting stronger effects for schools serving large populations of at-risk students. The authors of this research point out that quantity of time cannot be considered an independent variable, however, because the ways in which the time is used by educators and students is what actually matters for learning.

It is only common sense that if additional school time is not used for instructional activities or if additional instruction is poor in quality, it is unlikely to lead to achievement gains. ... Going further, we would suggest that instructional practices can be viewed as mediators of extended school time effects on students. That is, the effectiveness of instruction might determine whether extended school time has positive, negative, or no effects on student outcomes.

The National Center on Time & Learning has conducted research in high-performing expanded-time schools to better understand how time can be used in ways that promote strong student achievement. In its publication, Time Well Spent, NCTL identifies eight categories of practices: (a) making every minute count, (b) prioritizing time, (c) individualizing learning time, (d) building school culture, (e) incorporating a well-rounded education, (f) integrating program elements that focus on college and career success, (g) enabling productive teacher collaboration, and (h) assessing, analyzing and responding to data. Authors describe "dynamic synergies" among these practices that together help to ensure a productive use of school time.

== Organizations calling for ELT ==
America's Promise is a national partnership founded by Colin Powell in 1997 to help children from all socioeconomic sectors to have access to five promises in the United States. One of America's Promises five focus areas is an effective education. Through Grad Nation, America's Promise supports communities as they raise graduation rates, including through expanding learning time and opportunities.

The Ford Foundation is an independent, global philanthropic institution, committed to developing innovative leaders of social change. As part of its Education Opportunity and Scholarship Program in the U.S., the Foundation is a leader in providing support to initiatives that provide more and better learning time for students in neighborhoods of concentrated poverty.

Children At Risk is a non-profit organization in Texas that drives change for children through research, education, and influencing public policy. One of its key legislative priorities in education is expanded learning time.

Citizen Schools is a national nonprofit organization that partners with middle schools to expand the learning day for low-income children across the country. The organization's programs blend these real-world learning projects with rigorous academic and leadership development activities, preparing students in the middle grades for success in high school, college, the workforce, and civic life.

National Association for the Advancement of Colored People is a civil rights organization formed in 1909 with a mission to ensure the political, educational, social, and economic equality of rights of all persons. The NAACP included expanded learning time as one of the four focus points to increase education equality in their 2012 report "Finding Our Way Back to First: Reclaiming World Leadership by Educating All America's Children."

The National Center on Time & Learning (NCTL), a non-profit 501 (c)(3) organization, is dedicated to expanding learning time to improve student achievement and enable a well-rounded education. Through research, public policy and technical assistance, NCTL supports national, state and local initiatives that add significantly more school time for academic and enrichment opportunities to help children meet the demands of the 21st century.

The After-School Corporation (TASC) is a nonprofit intermediary organization founded in 1998. TASC demonstrates models for school re-invention, builds the capacity of schools and community partners to implement at scale, and advocates for sustainable expanded learning in New York and the nation. TASC leads the ExpandED Schools Network, with schools in Baltimore, New Orleans, and New York City.

Time to Succeed Coalition (TSC), launched in May 2012 by the National Center on Time & Learning and the Ford Foundation, is a diverse coalition, bringing educators, parents, community leaders and civic officials together with CEOs, policymakers, and leading thought leaders to inspire and motivate communities across the country to add more learning time as part of a redesigned school day and year, enabling children to get the education they need to succeed.

The Wallace Foundation is a national philanthropy that seeks to improve education and enrichment for disadvantaged children. One of its five major initiatives includes supporting school district and other efforts to expand learning time during summer and the regular school day or year.

== Why most Schools, districts, and states do not have ELT ==
Controversy over educational budgets and spending has led to much of the debate over ELT. Most cost estimates account for paying teachers and administrators for extending contract hours, but many of the other costs involved in public education have not even been added to current proposed budgets for ELT. "The recent proposal by Minnesota school superintendents to extend the school year by 25 days (from 175 to 200) was estimated to cost $750 million, which the superintendents determined was not feasible, either financially or politically." With most states currently operating in the red, adding educational budgetary spending is unlikely to occur. "America spends over $500 billion a year on public elementary and secondary education in the United States. On average, school districts spend $10,314 for each individual student." For the fiscal year 2010, State and local funding accounted for 87% of total funding in the U.S.

The focus of reform-minded politicians has been unilateral; Increase the output of citizens' economic potential in order to keep up with the rest of the world. What is forgot while new legislature is forged are the many other goals families and communities have for their children. Developing respect for each other, responsibility, economic sustainability, cultural diversity, equality, and happiness are just a few of the many goals Americans have for their children in schools. Larry Cuban, a professor emeritus of education at Stanford University argues that, "policy makers and reform-minded civic and business elites have not only defined economic problems as educational ones that can be fixed by more time spent in schools but also neglected the powerful hold socialization goals have on parents' and taxpayers' expectations."

There are other educational reform options for improving the U.S. educational system that do not cost more money and still allow for local control. Much of the current school day is spent on activities other than instruction. As stated in Improving student achievement by extending school: Is it just a matter of time?, by Aronson, Simmerman, & Carols, (1998) "A review of the research literature on how time is divided up during the school day shows that a large portion of the potential learning time is typically eaten up by non-instructional activities, which have little relationship to student learning." Districts and schools are brainstorming ways to reallocate time more effectively. Current staff development opportunities are focusing on time on task, a term associated with the amount of time students actually spend in engaged learning activities. Parents and communities members are partnering with local districts and schools to provide educational opportunities that engage students by individualizing instruction, yet still focus on the state and local curriculum. More focused curricular goals, such as the Common Core State Standards, have been implemented to help focus learning activities.

== See also ==
- History of education in the United States
