= Brockton High School =

American high school

Location
- 470 Forest Avenue; Brockton, Massachusetts 02301; United States; 42°4′5″N 71°2′39″W

Information
- School type: Public High School; Open enrollment
- Established: 1870; 156 years ago
- Status: Open, 7 AM to 3 PM
- School district: Brockton Public Schools
- School number: (508) 580-7633
- NCES School ID: 250309000385
- Principal: Kevin McCaskill
- Faculty: 260.60 (FTE)
- Grades: 9-12
- Enrollment: 3,598 (2024–2025)
- Student to teacher ratio: 14.70
- Colors: Black and red
- Athletics: MIAA - Division 1
- Athletics conference: Big Three Conference
- Mascot: Boxer
- Rivals: Durfee, New Bedford, Bridgewater-Raynham, Taunton, Waltham
- Website: BHS Website

Brockton High School, established in 1870, is a high school located in Brockton, Massachusetts, and part of Brockton Public Schools. As of 2016, it is one of the largest high schools in the United States of America, and the largest in Massachusetts with 4,029 students. Their mascot is the Boxers, paying tribute to the boxing history of the city and the boxers Rocky Marciano and Marvin Hagler, who are both alumni of Brockton High School.

== History ==
At its founding, Brockton High School had a maximum capacity of 125 students. As the population of Brockton grew, there was demand for a larger building. As a result, a new high school was constructed in 1967 consisting of 2 sides: an "A" Side and a "B" Side. By the 1970s, student numbers exceeded capacity, resulting in complications such as split sessions where underclassmen and upperclassmen attended school at different times of the day. The upperclassmen took classes in the mornings, and underclassmen took classes in the afternoons.

In 1975, the City Council Finance Committee approved an $8 million proposal to construct a new high school that could accommodate the growing student body. In 1975 the ground for the new building was broken, and in 1980, the school was complete. The "A" building has since been torn down. The "B" building, which housed a pre-K center and then charter and alternative school programs, was torn down in fall 2022 in order to allow for construction of a new public safety center. The highest number of students ever housed in the school was 4,250.

In the 2000s, Nahyo M. Kim of The New York Times wrote that Brockton High "was a case study in failure". At that time the school's unofficial motto was "students have a right to fail if they want". In 2000, the school set up a reform plan — using the skill areas of reading, reasoning, speaking, and writing in the school's curriculum. By 2001, student performance had improved. Susan Szachowicz, the former principal, said that the school culture and large size was crucial to the school's turnaround. This occurred in a period when education advocates had promoted smaller schools.

== Campus ==
Brockton High School occupies a large, multi-building campus extending approximately one-third of a mile (about 0.54 km) in length, with an estimated 13.5 acres (about 55,000 m²) of total floor space.

The campus consists of nine buildings, including four primary academic buildings organized by color designation (Green, Red, Azure, and Yellow) and connected by a central core. Additional buildings house gymnasium and fine arts facilities.

Major shared facilities include a football stadium, an ice skating rink, a 25-yard (about 23 m) swimming pool, a 1,608-seat auditorium, and four cafeterias.

When the current campus opened in 1970, it incorporated specialized facilities such as a greenhouse, a planetarium, a campus-wide public address system, and a television studio. The television studio was renovated in 2003. As of 2026, expansion and renovation plans had been reported, with a finalized design replacing the main academic building with a larger one designed to implement modern STEM learning methods.

== Academics ==
In 1999, 75% of its students failed Massachusetts Comprehensive Assessment System (MCAS) mathematics examinations and 44% failed MCAS English examinations. Around that period, about 1/3 of students of each Brockton class dropped out. By 2001, student performance improved. Between 2000 and 2001, more students went from failing to passing at Brockton High than at any other school in Massachusetts.

In 2005, 98% of the senior class (850 students) graduated. In 2023, 75% of the graduating senior class planned to pursue a college degree. In 2006, Brockton High School was a recipient of the National School Change Award. Brockton High School was one of 6 schools in the United States to receive this award. Out of the seven schools, there were only two high schools.

In 2008, Brockton students had a higher level of improvement on the English MCAS than 90% of high schools. By 2010 it was one of the highest performing schools on the MCAS.

== Athletics ==
=== Football ===
- Since the football teams' inaugural season in 1897, they have gone a total of 17 seasons undefeated and have had 15 one-loss seasons.
- Since 1972, the football team has made 17 appearances in the MIAA Division 1 State Championship game, winning 11 times (1972, 1973, 1984, 1985, 1987, 1988, 1991, 1992, 1996, 2004, 2005).
- The Boxers have also won 1 MSSPA State Championship (1948), and 2 MIAC State Championships (1960, 1970), bringing their total number of state championships to 14.
- In 1948, the Boxers played in a post-season game against Miami Edison Senior High School, winning 34–0.
- From 1979–1992, Brockton a leading high school football team in the country. During this 14-year period, the Boxers' won 6 state championships, won 11 league championships, had 3 undefeated seasons, and had 8 one-loss seasons. The Boxers' record during this period was 118-14-0. They used to be regarded as one of the greatest high school football programs at the 1980s.

==== Football accomplishments ====
- National Championships (1) - 1948
- State Championships (14) - 1948, 1960, 1970, 1972, 1973, 1984, 1985, 1987, 1988, 1991, 1992, 1996, 2004, 2005
- State Finalists (11) - 1950, 1958, 1959, 1979, 1980, 1981, 1989, 1998, 2006, 2008, 2012
- Undefeated seasons (17) - 1899, 1900, 1924, 1932, 1936, 1937, 1939, 1945, 1958, 1959, 1970, 1972, 1973, 1984, 1985, 1987, 2005
- One-loss seasons (15) - 1897, 1918, 1921, 1930, 1938, 1948, 1960, 1979, 1980, 1982, 1986, 1988, 1989, 1990, 1992

==== Notable accomplishments ====
- The football team has made USA Today's Top 25 list a total of 4 times: 1984 (#7), 1985 (#9), 1987 (#5), and 1988 (#17).
- Over 20 players from Brockton have played in the NFL, including Ken MacAfee, Greg McMurtry, Rudy Harris and Al Louis-Jean.
- Brockton has the 14th-most wins of any high school football program in the country.

Armond Colombo, who coached at Brockton for 34 years (1969–2002), has the second-most wins of a head coach in Massachusetts history, behind only Ken LaChapelle of Northbridge High School. Colombo retired as head coach in 2002 with an overall record of 316-100-5. Before Colombo arrived in Brockton in 1969, he was the head coach at nearby Archbishop Williams High School from 1955–1968. At the school, he led the bishops to five Catholic Conference titles and three Massachusetts Class D State Championships. Colombo amassed 96 wins as the head coach of Archbishop Williams, and 220 wins as the head coach of Brockton.

=== Other sports ===
The school's mascot is the Boxer. The actual mascot is a dog, but the name is a pun in reference to Rocky Marciano and Marvin Hagler, two famous boxers from Brockton. The stadium in which the Boxers' football, field hockey, soccer, and outdoor track teams compete is named Rocky Marciano Stadium in reference to the boxer. With a capacity of approximately 10,000 people, Marciano Stadium is one of the largest high school stadiums in Massachusetts and is one of the premier facilities in the state as well. The stadium also plays host to numerous Massachusetts high school football state playoff games, including the sectional and regional finals.

The BHS baseball team plays their home games at Campanelli Stadium, constructed in 2002.

In 2012, a nearly 30-foot-tall bronze statue of Rocky Marciano was erected outside the north end of the stadium as a tribute to the boxer.

== Notable alumni ==
- Kristian Alfonso – actress
- Chris Bender – R&B singer
- Gerry Cassidy – member of the Massachusetts House of Representatives and former political aide
- Claire D. Cronin – United States Ambassador to Ireland
- Keith Davidson – former lawyer for Stormy Daniels
- Kenneth Feinberg – Special Master of the September 11th Victim Compensation Fund
- Mike Gordon – former MLB player (Chicago Cubs)
- Marvin Hagler – middleweight boxing champion
- Pooch Hall – actor
- Rudy Harris – NFL football player, attended Clemson, played for the Tampa Bay Buccaneers
- Mark Hartsell – gridiron football quarterback, played for Boston College, and professionally for the Chicago Bears and Scottish Claymores of the NFL and NFL Europe
- James Kelleher – musician, Jimmy Luxury and the Tommy Rome Orchestra. Songs appeared in the movies "Go" and "Ocean's Eleven"
- John Kiely – former MLB player (Detroit Tigers)
- Al Louis-Jean – NFL player
- Ken MacAfee – NFL football player, attended Notre Dame, played for the San Francisco 49ers
- Rocky Marciano – heavyweight boxing champion
- Brian McFadden – cartoonist for The New York Times, Big Fat Whale
- Greg McMurtry – NFL football player, attended Michigan, played for the Chicago Bears & New England Patriots
- Freddie Moncewicz – former MLB player (Boston Red Sox)
- Aaron Monteiro – professional football player
- Lou Montgomery – first Black athlete to play for Boston College
- Adam Myerson – professional bicycle racer specializing in cyclo-cross and criterium racing
- Lynda Newton – professional wrestler
- Eric Rubin, MD, PhD – microbiologist, Editor-in-chief of the New England Journal of Medicine
- Wally Snell – former MLB player (Boston Red Sox)
- Walt Uzdavinis – gridiron football player
- Dave Wedge – author
- Herbert Warren Wind – author
