= Al Louis-Jean =

American football player (born 1993)

Profile
- Position: Cornerback

Personal information
- Born: October 13, 1993 (age 33); Brockton, Massachusetts, U.S.
- Listed height: 6 ft 2 in (1.88 m)
- Listed weight: 194 lb (88 kg)

Career information
- High school: Brockton (MA)
- College: Boston College
- NFL draft: 2014: undrafted

Career history
- Chicago Bears (2014); Washington Redskins (2015–2016)*; Miami Dolphins (2016)*; Ottawa Redblacks (2017)*; Massachusetts Pirates (2019–2021); Northern Arizona Wranglers (2023); Omaha Beef (2024)*; Tucson Sugar Skulls (2024)
- * Offseason or practice squad member only

Career NFL statistics
- Total tackles: 9
- Stats at Pro Football Reference

Albert Louis-Jean Jr. (born October 13, 1993) is an American professional football cornerback. He played college football at Boston College. He has been a member of the Chicago Bears, Washington Redskins, Miami Dolphins, Ottawa Redblacks, Massachusetts Pirates and Northern Arizona Wranglers.

== Early life ==
Louis-Jean played high school football at Brockton High School in Brockton, Massachusetts. He was selected to the 2010 Massachusetts High School Coaches Association Super 26 All-State Team, earned Boston Globe and Boston Herald All-Scholastic honors, was a two-time Brockton Enterprise All-Scholastic choice and was team MVP as a senior defensive back. He recorded 60 tackles and five interceptions as a senior. He also had 30 receptions for 650 yards and five touchdowns in 2010, completing his career with 12 interceptions. He also played basketball and track.

== College career ==
Louis-Jean originally committed to play for the Miami Hurricanes, but eventually de-committed and instead decided to commit to play for Boston College. Louis-Jean played for the Eagles from 2011 to 2013. He sat out the 2012 season. After his junior season, and with two years of NCAA eligibility remaining, Louis-Jean decided to forgo his college career and declared for the 2014 NFL draft.

== Professional career ==
=== Chicago Bears ===
Louis-Jean signed with the Chicago Bears on June 2, 2014, after going undrafted in the 2014 NFL draft. He was released by the Bears on August 30. On September 1, Louis-Jean was re-signed to the team's practice squad. He was promoted to the active roster on October 7.

On February 4, 2015, Louis-Jean signed a two-year contract extension with the Bears. Louis-Jean was released by the Bears on August 30.

=== Washington Redskins ===
Louis-Jean was signed to the Washington Redskins' practice squad on January 5, 2016. He signed a futures contract with Washington on January 11, 2016. Louis-Jean was released by the Redskins on May 2.

=== Miami Dolphins ===
Louis-Jean signed with the Miami Dolphins on August 8, 2016. On August 27, he was waived by the Dolphins.

=== Ottawa Redblacks ===
On March 1, 2017, Louis-Jean signed with the Ottawa Redblacks of the Canadian Football League (CFL). He was released by the Redblacks on May 28.

=== Massachusetts Pirates ===
Louis-Jean signed with the Massachusetts Pirates of the National Arena League (NAL) for the 2019 season. Louis-Jean appeared in eight games while recording nine tackles and one pass defensed.

In November 2019, Louis-Jean re-signed with the Pirates for the 2020 season.

=== Northern Arizona Wranglers ===
On March 13, 2023, Louis-Jean signed with the Northern Arizona Wranglers of the Indoor Football League (IFL). On August 27, Louis-Jean was released by the Wranglers.

=== Omaha Beef ===
On December 1, 2023, Louis-Jean signed with the Omaha Beef of the NAL.
