= Deborah Tolman =

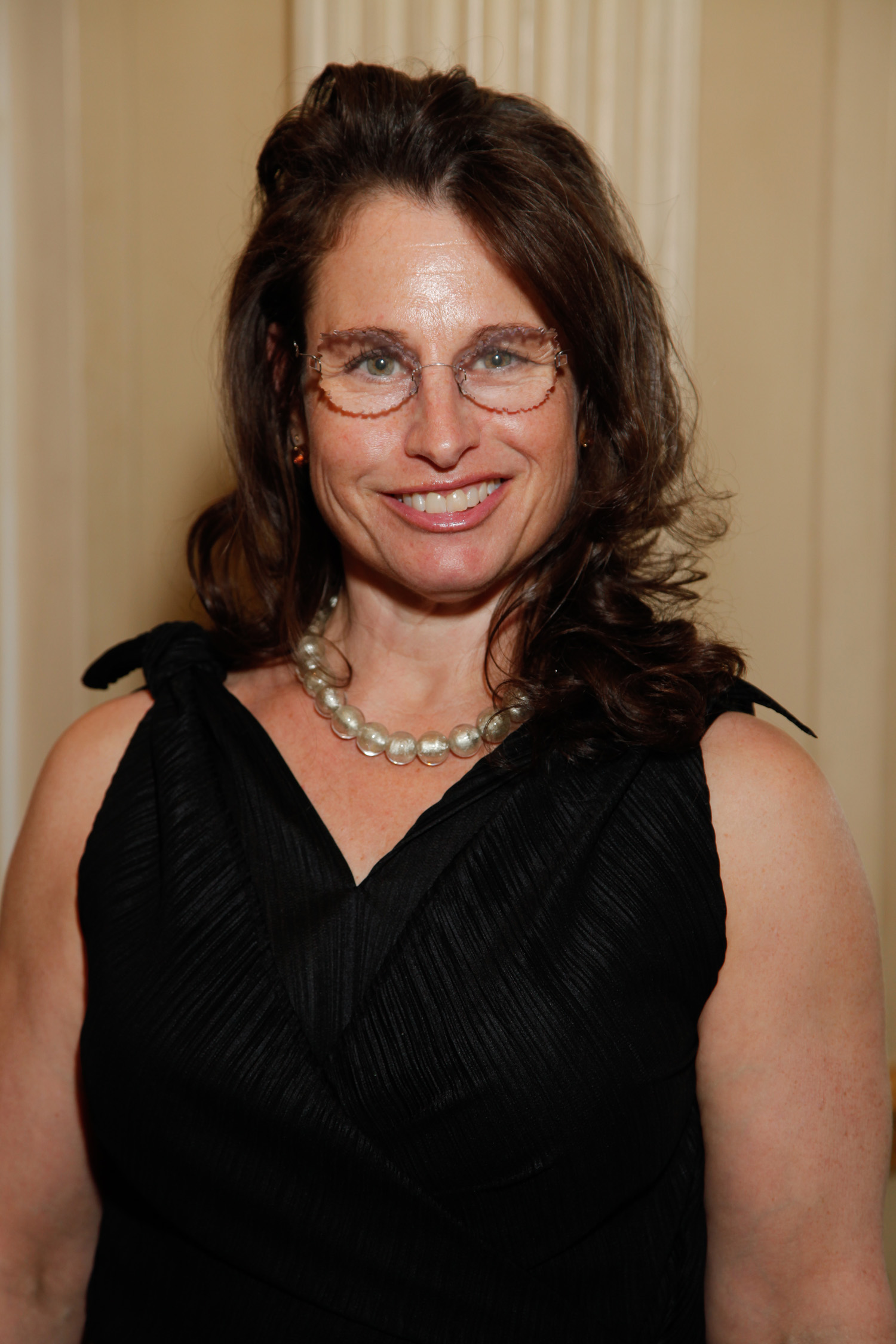
Deborah Tolman, as honoree at Women's eNews 21 Leaders 2012

Deborah L. Tolman is a developmental psychologist and the co-founder of SPARK: Sexualization Protest: Action, Resistance, Knowledge. She is the author of Dilemmas of Desire: Teenage Girls Talk about Sexuality, which was awarded the 2003 Distinguished Book Award from the Association for Women in Psychology.

== Career ==
Tolman received her Ed.D from Harvard University in 1992. She is the former director of the Center for Research on Gender and Sexuality, and professor of human sexuality studies at San Francisco State University. Before moving to San Francisco, she was "the senior research scientist and director of the Gender and Sexuality Project, and then an associate director of the Center for Research on Women, both at Wellesley College."

Tolman is currently a professor of Women and Gender Studies at the Hunter College School of Social Work, and professor of Critical Social Psychology at the Graduate Center of CUNY.

Her research on adolescent sexuality, gender development, gender equity and research methods has been funded by grants from the National Institute of Child Health and Human Development, the Department of Health and Human Services, the Ford Foundation, and the Spencer Foundation.

In October 2010, Tolman co-founded SPARK (Sexualization Protest: Action, Resistance, Knowledge), an intergenerational "girl-fueled" movement building organization (with Lyn Mikel Brown) dedicated to challenging the sexualization of girls by engaging girls to be activists and working with partner organizations around the country. SPARK links academia to activism and suggests an alternative to the divisive "wave metaphor" regarding feminism.

In 2018 Tolman founded SexGenLab, a sexuality and gender educational tool and research collective, in partnership with Graduate Center CUNY students.

Tolman was president of the Society of Qualitative Inquiry in Psychology (SQIP), a section of APA Division 5, and worked on the advancement of qualitative methodology. SQIP is responsible for producing the Qualitative Psychology Journal.

Tolman is a commentator in the 2023 Hulu documentary Pretty Baby: Brooke Shields. The documentary follows the life and career of actress and model Brooke Shields from her exploitation as a child star to her work as an adult.

== Writing ==
In 2003 Tolman's book on adolescent girls' sexuality, Dilemmas of Desire: Teenage Girls Talk about Sexuality, was awarded the 2003 Distinguished Book Award from the Association for Women in Psychology. Her collaboration with Carol Gilligan led to the creation of “The Listening Guide” methodology, a research method used to interpret subject interview transcripts with an emphasis on vocal communication cues.

Tolman was Editor-in-Chief alongside psychologist Lisa M. Diamond of the APA Handbook of Sexuality and Psychology published by American Psychological Association in 2013.

Tolman has written 60+ articles and book chapters on adolescent girls' and boys' sexuality and research methods. Tolman's work and commentary on adolescent sexuality and challenging sexualization has appeared in The New York Times, The Huffington Post, and multiple radio, television and online venues, including New York City's Joan Hamburg radio show and Brian Lehrer Show.

== Personal life ==
Tolman is married to Luis Ubiñas. They live in New York City and have two sons.
