= Rennie Center for Education Research & Policy =

Nonprofit, public policy think tank, located in Boston, Massachusetts, USA

Rennie Center for Education Research & Policy is a small, nonprofit, public policy think tank, located in Boston, Massachusetts, that “seeks to foster thoughtful public discourse and informed policy making through non-partisan, independent research and constructive dialogue on key education reform issues.” The Rennie Center's mission is “to develop a public agenda that promotes significant improvement of public education in Massachusetts,” and its work includes the production of research reports and briefs, public forums on a variety of education topics, and work in school districts on labor-management collaboration.

The Rennie Center for Education Research & Policy was founded by Massachusetts’ former Secretary of Education Paul Reville as a division of the Massachusetts Institute for a New Commonwealth (MassINC) in October 2002 and was named for John C. (Jack) Rennie who was instrumental in developing and passing the Massachusetts Education Reform Act of 1993. In the summer of 2005, the Rennie Center became an independent non-profit organization.

During 2011, the Rennie Center published research about learning plans, dropout prevention and school finance, and educational assessment, including science assessment, assessment for English language learners, and computer adaptive testing. In 2011, the Rennie Center also held events about Common Core State Standards, teacher evaluation, and career and technical education related to the Harvard Graduate School of Education's Pathways to Prosperity report.

Rennie Center research has been cited in numerous media outlets including WBUR, The Boston Globe, Education Week and The Washington Times.
