= New Bedford High School =

Coordinates: 41°38′21.37″N 70°56′14.14″W

Location
- 230 Hathaway Blvd. New Bedford, Massachusetts 02740; United States

Information
- Type: Public
- Established: 1827
- School district: New Bedford Public Schools
- Principal: Joyce Cardoza
- Staff: 212.66 (FTE)
- Enrollment: 2,878 (2024-2025)
- Student to teacher ratio: 13.53
- Colors: Red & white
- Athletics: MIAA - Division 1
- Athletics conference: Big 3
- Nickname: Whalers
- Rivals: Brockton High School, B.M.C. Durfee High School, Dartmouth High School (Massachusetts)
- Communities served: New Bedford, Acushnet
- Website: nbhs.newbedfordschools.org

New Bedford High School (NBHS) is a public high school in New Bedford, Massachusetts, United States. It is located at 230 Hathaway Boulevard in the West End and was established in 1827 (though the current building was built in 1972). It also serves students from Acushnet, Massachusetts.

Its current enrollment is approximately 2,000 students, and it is one of the largest schools in the state. It is a part of the New Bedford Public Schools school district, being one of the district's three high schools. (The other two are Trinity Day Academy and Whaling City High School.)

NBHS has a history of several extracurricular programs. These include basketball, volleyball, baseball, soccer, football, wrestling, track and field, and a Junior Reserve Officers' Training Corps training program. The school's athletic teams are known as the "Whalers".

== History ==
The school is the 3rd physical site of NBHS since being established as one of the first High Schools in the Commonwealth of Massachusetts in 1827. The current school was built in 1972.

The high school serves Acushnet as its district, along with Fairhaven High School and Academy of the Fairhaven School District, takes Acushnet students for secondary school.

== Extracurricular activities ==
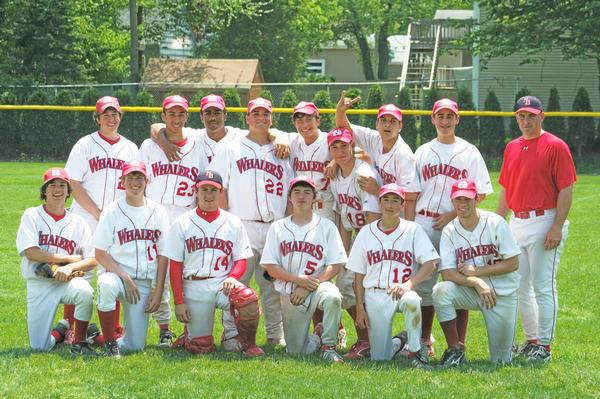
2007 baseball

The school's athletic teams are named the Whalers, in honor of the city's whaling history. The New Bedford High School teams wear red and white, and compete in the Massachusetts Interscholastic Athletic Association's Division I. Their fight song, "On, New Bedford" is sung to the tune of "On, Wisconsin!"

=== Basketball ===
The boys' basketball program at New Bedford High School has long been one of the most successful in the state. Ed Rodrigues coached the varsity team for 27 years (1980–2007). During his tenure as head coach, the Whalers were one of the state's top-performing teams year after year and made numerous appearances in the state tournament, winning back-to-back Division 1 State titles in 1993 and 1994. His teams also won two additional Eastern Massachusetts Finals and two additional South Sectional titles. There were only two losing seasons in his career. On February 21, 2007, Rodrigues coached his final game at New Bedford High School. The Whalers lost to the visiting St. Raphael Academy Saints of Pawtucket, Rhode Island 69–66. Rodrigues ended his tenure at the school with a career record of 435–157. He continues to be a teacher at the school, is still heavily involved with the basketball program and the entire athletic department, and is currently an assistant men's basketball coach at UMass Dartmouth. In 2009, New Bedford High School's basketball court was officially dedicated in Rodrigues' name.

Long-time boys' assistant/junior varsity coach Tom Tarpey took over as head coach at the start of the 2007–08 season. In his first season, the Whalers went 11–9 in the regular season and made the state tournament. They lost in the first round of the Division I South Sectional on the road to the Framingham Flyers 69–62. The following season (2008–09), the boys finished with a record of 8-12 and did not qualify for the tournament. They also did not qualify in 2009–10 with a 7–13 record. With the experience of the underclassmen, plus the brief addition of a highly touted prospect transferred from Division III State champions the Wareham Vikings, a huge turnaround occurred in the 2010–11 season. The Whalers returned to prominence and finished the regular season with a record of 16–3, earning the 3rd seed in the Division I South Sectional tournament. They lost in the sectional semifinals to the Newton North Tigers 67–44.

In the 2007–08 school year, the girls' basketball team captured the Division I South Sectional title by defeating the Sandwich High Blue Knights 65–62 at UMass Boston, giving them the opportunity to compete in the Eastern Massachusetts Finals at the TD Banknorth Garden in Boston; they lost to the Division I North champion Andover High Golden Warriors 66–34. Head coach Mickey Gonsalves was named Division 1 Girls' Basketball Coach of the Year by the Boston Globe. In the 2010–11 season, the Lady Whalers completed an undefeated regular season at 20-0 when they defeated the visiting Barnstable Red Raiders 63–44. They earned the top seed in the Division I South Sectional tournament and won their second South Sectional title by defeating the Mansfield Hornets 47–46 at the now TD Garden. The Lady Whalers lost in the Eastern Mass Finals to North Sectional champion Andover 54–46, also at the Garden.

Basketball Accomplishments

- Boys' Basketball: Division 1 State Champions - 1993, 1994

=== Volleyball ===
In the 2009–10 school year, the girls' volleyball team completed an undefeated season (23–0), culminating in the state championship for Division I. Junior outside hitter Maura Manley led the state with 408 kills on the season and received numerous honors, including a nomination for the Gatorade Player of the Year in Massachusetts and a MaxPreps/AVCA Player of the Week nod. At the end of the season, the team was the number 1 team in the state and 48th in the nation according to MaxPreps.com and was ranked 50th on the site's "final Xcellent 50 High School Girls' Volleyball National Rankings". 26-year head coach Neil Macedo was inducted into the 2009 Massachusetts Girls' Volleyball Coaches Association Hall of Fame. Only one senior, Kiana Raposo, was featured on this squad. The following year's team was heavily favored to repeat as state champions but were defeated in the Division I South Sectional final by rejuvenated 13-time Division 1 state champion powerhouse and archrival Barnstable High School. Dartmouth College-bound Maura Manley was named Gatorade Massachusetts Volleyball Player of the Year for the 2010–2011 school year.

Volleyball Accomplishments

- Girls' Volleyball: Division 1 State Champions - 1994, 2009
- Boys' Volleyball: Division 1 State Champions - 1989, 1991, 1993, 1994, 1995, 1997, 1998, 1999

=== Baseball ===
The school's baseball team won 3 State Championships in Division 1 in the 1990s. In 1858 New Bedford High School fielded a team making them the first high school or secondary school in the country to do so.

NBHS won in 1993, 1994, and 1998.

=== Music ===
The school has an award-winning marching band, winning several regional and state championships. On January 20, 1997, the marching band had the honor of performing in the inaugural parade during the second inauguration of Bill Clinton in Washington. The school fight song, On, New Bedford!, is sung to the tune of On, Wisconsin!, which is primarily performed during football games and the annual pep rally. New Bedford High School also has a very prominent show choir, who like the band, competes in regional and New England competitions. New Bedford High School also has an award-winning jazz band and jazz combo that play in local events and regional festivals.

=== Football ===
In 2010–11 school year, the football team upset football powerhouse Brockton High School 23–21, followed by a 21-7 Thanksgiving Day victory over Fall River's B.M.C. Durfee High School, to earn its first Big Three Conference title since 1999 and earn a spot in the Division I Eastern Massachusetts Super Bowl for the first time since 2001. They lost in the semifinals to Catholic Conference champion St. John's Prep by a score of 35–7. Head coach Dennis Golden was named New England Patriots High School Coach of the Week following the victory over Brockton. In the following season, the Whalers finished the regular season at 5-5 overall and 1–1 in the Big Three. Although they were defeated by Brockton 38-9 for the conference title, a conference by-law states that the playoff representative must have a record of .500 or better. On Thanksgiving, New Bedford defeated Durfee 18-16 while Brockton lost to Bridgewater-Raynham Regional High School 14–8 to finish the season at 5–6, giving the Whalers the right to represent the Big Three in the Division I Super Bowl for a second consecutive year. They will face the Bay State Conference's Carey Division champion Needham High School in the semifinals on Tuesday, November 29. Traditionally, New Bedford High School has had an intense rivalry with Durfee, with their Thanksgiving Day match-up, as the highlight of the season.

In 2013, New Bedford Whalers head coach Dennis Golden stepped down from the position. He compiled a record of 43-59-1, including 2 Big Three Conference titles and 6 straight wins against rival Durfee during his 10 years as head coach.

Football Accomplishments

- Division 1A State Champions - 1993, 1994
- Division 1A State Finalists - 1995, 1997, 1999
- Division 3 State Finalists - 1985
- Big Three Conference Champions - 1985, 1993, 1994, 1995, 1997, 1999, 2010, 2011, 2013

=== Soccer ===
In 2010, the Whalers' boys' soccer team played against powerhouse the Ludlow Lions in the Division I State final, their first since 1978. They lost to Ludlow by a score of 4–1. Head coach John Macaroco was named a Coach of the Year by the Boston Globe. In 2025, the Whalers had a breakout season scoring 50 goals, winning 13 games, and becoming the number 5 team in Division 1 unfortunately falling to Winchester in the MIAA Round of 32.

- Boys' Soccer D-I State Champions - 1971
- Boys' Soccer D-I State Finalists - 1978, 2010
- Boys' Soccer Big Three Conference Champions 2000-2012, 2014, 2017, 2019, 2020, 2025

=== Wrestling ===
The wrestling team won the Big 3 Championship in 2016, as well as the D1S sectional, and placed 4th in the Division 1 state tournament.

=== Track and Field ===
New Bedford High School has had a long and storied history in the sport of Track and Field as there are records of teams participating as early as the 1920s. The first boys State Class A (now Division I) title was captured in the 1964 spring season.

Track and Field Accomplishments (as of 2024)

- Boys Indoor Class A (DI) titles won: 1966, 1981, 1989, 2011
- Boys Outdoor Class A (DI) titles won: 1964, 1965, 1976, 1980, 1982, 1983, 1995
- Boys Outdoor All State Team titles won: 1976, 1980, 1983, 1993, 1995, 2002
- Boys New England Team Titles won: 1980
- Girls Indoor All State Team title won: 2007
- New Bedford High School male Track and Field athletes have won 111 DI individual titles, 19 individual All State titles and 14 individual New England titles
- New Bedford High School female athletes have won 28 DI individual titles, 12 All State individual titles and 6 New England individual titles

Cross Country

Under Coach Al Boucher, New Bedford was a dominant cross country program in the late 1950s through the mid 1960s.

Cross Country Accomplishments (as of 2024)

- Boys Class A (now Division I) titles won: 1958, 1960, 1961, 1962, 1963, 1964
- Boys State Team titles: 1960, 1962,, 1963
- Boys New England Team titles: 1960
- New Bedford High School boys have won 2 DI individual cross country titles and 2 New England individual titles
- Girls Division I title won: 1986

=== Army Junior Reserve Officers Training Corps ===
New Bedford High School is also home of the Whaler JROTC. New Bedford's JROTC program is notable for being the longest in continuous operation since inception. The Army JROTC at New Bedford has received many awards.

=== Show Choir & Drama Club ===
New Bedford High School also has a mixed show choir "Pure Energy." They have won many awards, the most recent being the 2009 Grand Champions at the New England Show Choir Classic. The group varies between 40 and 50 members. The school is also the home of another show choir "Charisma". This group is made up of only females and consists of about 30 members. They have recently won Copper Trophy award at the New England Show Choir Classic and in the past have won Grand Champion in their division. A majority of the choir members also participate in the school's award-winning drama club.

== Notable alumni ==
- André Bernier, 1977: television meteorologist
- Armand Cure, 1938: professional football and basketball player
- Charles Reis Felix, 1941: writer
- Keith Francis, 1972: middle-distance track athlete
- Robert Healey, 1980: New Hampshire politician
- Brian Helgeland, 1979: screenwriter and director
- Marques Houtman, 1997: basketball player for the Cape Verde national basketball team
- Irwin M. Jacobs, 1950: co-founder of Qualcomm, billionaire, philanthropist
- Samantha Johnson (born 1989): singer and professional wrestling ring announcer
- Theodore Morde (born 1911): adventurer, explorer, diplomat, spy, journalist, and television news producer
- Sean Nelson, 1987: musician, journalist, music critic, and filmmaker
- Laurie Santos, 1993: Yale University professor
- Jared Shuster (born 1998): Atlanta Braves baseball pitcher, first round 2020 MLB draft pick
