= Rudy Harris =

American football player (born 1971)

No. 43
- Position: Running back

Personal information
- Born: September 18, 1971 (age 55); Brockton, Massachusetts, U.S.
- Listed height: 6 ft 1 in (1.85 m)
- Listed weight: 255 lb (116 kg)

Career information
- High school: Brockton
- College: Clemson
- NFL draft: 1993: 4th round, 91st overall pick

Career history
- Tampa Bay Buccaneers (1993–1994); Washington Redskins (1996)*; Philadelphia Eagles (1997)*
- * Offseason or practice squad member only

Career NFL statistics
- Rushing yards: 29
- Rushing average: 3.2
- Receptions: 6
- Receiving yards: 59
- Stats at Pro Football Reference

Onzell Andre "Rudy" Harris (born September 18, 1971) is an American former professional football player. Harris first gained attention as a running back for Brockton High School. He attended Clemson University, where he played football 1990 to 1992. He was selected by the Tampa Bay Buccaneers in the fourth round of the 1993 NFL draft. He played in the National Football League (NFL) for the Buccaneers in 1993 and 1994. He had his first start in an NFL game against the San Francisco 49ers in November 1993 and had a 25-yard pass reception in the game. After spending two seasons with the Buccaneers, Harris was released in August 1995. He played in 18 games in the NFL, two as a starter. In his two NFL seasons, he rushed for 29 yards on nine carries and caught six passes for 59 yards.
