= Extended school time =

U.S. proposal for increasing hours students spend in school

Extended school time is a proposal in the United States for increasing the number of mandatory hours per week that students spend at school.

	Days in school year (median)	Total instructional hours	Math scores, 15-year-olds
Australia	345	815	520
Brazil	200	800	370
Denmark	200	648	513
Germany	123	758	504
Italy	167	601	462
Japan	200	600	523
Luxembourg	176	642	490
Mexico	200	1047	406
New Zealand	194	968	522
Norway	190	654	490
Russia	169	845	476
South Korea	204	545	547
Spain	176	713	480
United States	180	1056	476
Chart data is from a July 2010 Time magazine article chart. "Sources: American Sociological Review; Karl L. Alexander, Johns Hopkins University; Organisation for Economic Co-operation and Development; National Center for Educational Statistics. Reported by Ruchika Tulshyan."

The 1983 report by the U.S. National Commission on Excellence in Education, A Nation at Risk, suggested that expectations, content, and time needed to be improved in American education. Since then increasing the amount of time in school became a hot topic, and for the past few years, the proposal saw a resurgence of interest in response to No Child Left Behind, with dozens of proposals around the nation to extend the school year. In December 2009, President Obama proposed that American school children extend their time in class, either by lengthening the school day or the school year.

A July 2010 Time magazine article has a chart showing that students in the United States have the highest total yearly instructional hours of those nations listed.

Various studies have yielded widely different results in regard to the correlation between school time and academic achievement. Massachusetts 2020 and its national affiliate, the National Center on Time & Learning, are resources for an enlarging group of states and districts that are exploring expanded learning time—several of which, including Oklahoma, Alabama, and Rhode Island, have launched new initiatives in 2010. In 2006, Massachusetts 2020 worked with state leaders in Massachusetts to spearhead the Massachusetts Expanded Learning Time Initiative, the first-in-the-nation statewide initiative to expand the school day. In 2010–2011, 19 schools in 10 school districts will have schedules increase learning time by 300 hours across the school year.

Research suggests that expanding instructional time is as effective as other commonly discussed educational interventions intended to boost learning, such as increasing teacher quality and reducing class size. It also suggests that the added high-quality teaching time particularly benefits certain groups of students, such as low-income students and others who have little opportunity for learning outside of school. Researchers caution that not all time in school is equal. The correlation between time and achievement increases exists only when students are given more instructional time and academic learning time. Other researchers conclude that more time spent in the classroom will have little impact on academic achievement if it is not accompanied by other education reforms. They show that the key to student learning gains is the quality of the teacher, not the amount of time spent in school. Some homeschooler families are objective of the proposal on the basis that longer school time takes more away from family time. Cost is another major factor; though like per pupil costs, hard to generalize across states, due to differences in geography, cost-of-living costs, right-to-work vs. union states, etc. In 1990, cost estimates ranged from $2.3 to $121.4 million per day, depending on the state. In addition, advocates for a return to a later, more traditional start to the school day caution that extending school time by beginning the day even earlier in the morning can be counterproductive and even unhealthy, interfering with the sleep needs of middle and high school students in the many schools where the first bell already rings in the 7 a.m. hour and bus runs start at 5:30 or 6 a.m.—a practice that has become increasingly common since the 1970s.
