= New Bedford Public Schools =

Public school system of New Bedford, Massachusetts

Location
- 455 County Street, New Bedford, MA 02740 United States

District information
- Type: Public
- Grades: K-12
- Superintendent: Andrew O’Leary
- Schools: 26
- Budget: $182,502,046 total $13,256 per pupil (2016)

Students and staff
- Students: 12,565
- Teachers: 816
- Student–teacher ratio: 15.6 to 1

Other information
- Website: www.newbedfordschools.org

New Bedford Public Schools (NBPS) is a school district serving New Bedford, Massachusetts, United States. Its headquarters are in the Paul Rodrigues Administration Building.

During the 2006–07 academic year, the New Bedford school district (then under the direction of Superintendent Michael Longo) was one of several in Massachusetts labeled as "underperforming" under the state's MCAS guidelines. The school system, like that of nearby Fall River, is also in the process of major school upgrades and consolidations, having rebuilt several of its schools in recent years. The most recent, Keith Middle School, required a cleanup of the polluted soil on the site.

The district administrative departments are headquartered the Paul Rodrigues Administration Bldg., housed in the former New Bedford High School high building on County Street, is made up of twenty-five schools.

It is one of two districts, along with Fairhaven School District, that takes Acushnet students for secondary school.

== History ==
By 2019 the district received an influx of students speaking the Kʼicheʼ language. In 2019 an advocacy group for the Maya people complained to the courts that the school district was not providing adequate Kʼicheʼ language services. As of December 2022, New Bedford Public Schools had 161 enrolled students who speak primarily K’iché out of its 13,000 student population. The U.S. Department of Justice and the school district came to resolution so the school district could provide appropriate Kʼicheʼ language services. The Equal Educational Opportunities Act of 1974 requires school districts to provide services to speakers of languages other than English.

== Demographics ==
In 2022, the student count was 13,000; these students spoke 40 languages and originated from 25 countries. Of the total students, 5,000 were classified as having English as a second language. 42% of the total student body had a home language other than English.

== Schools ==
=== High School ===
- New Bedford High School
- Trinity Day Academy
- Whaling City Jr./Sr. High

=== Middle School ===
- Keith Middle School
- Normandin Middle School
- Roosevelt Middle School

=== Elementary ===
- Ashley Elementary
- Brooks Elementary
- Campbell Elementary
- Carney Academy
- Congdon Elementary
- DeValles Elementary
- Gomes Elementary
- Hathaway Elementary
- Hayden-McFadden Elementary
- Jacobs Elementary
- Lincoln Elementary
- Pacheco Elementary
- Parker Early Childhood Center
- Pulaski Elementary
- Rodman Elementary
- Swift Elementary
- Taylor Elementary
- Winslow Elementary
