= Chris Gabrieli =

American businessman

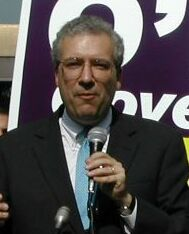

Chairman of the Massachusetts Board of Higher Education
- Incumbent
- Assumed office 2015
- Nominated by: Charlie Baker

Personal details
- Born: Buffalo, New York, U.S.
- Education: Harvard College (A.B.)

Chris Gabrieli (born February 5, 1960) is an American education policy and innovation leader. He is CEO of the non-profit Empower Schools, Chairman of the Board of the Massachusetts Department of Higher Education and part-time Lecturer at the Harvard Graduate School of Education.

== Early life and education ==
Gabrieli was born in Buffalo, New York and graduated with an A.B. in 1981 from Harvard College. He also attended two years of the Columbia College of Physicians & Surgeons before leaving to co-found a healthcare software company. His parents were both immigrants and his brother is John Gabrieli, PhD, a Professor of Brain and Cognitive Scientists at the Massachusetts Institute of Technology with whom he has collaborated on research in education in recent years.

== Career ==
Gabrieli began his first career in entrepreneurship as the co-founder of and CEO of a healthcare informatics company called GMIS which was eventually purchased by industry leader McKesson HBO, where its products continue to be sold and used.

Gabrieli spent the majority of his business career with Bessemer Venture Partners where he started as an associate in 1986 and made his way to Partner in 18 months. As Partner he led the life sciences practice for nearly twenty years, investing in over fifty healthcare and biotechnology companies. He was twice named to Forbes list of the top 100 venture capitalists in America. In 2000, he left Bessemer to focus on education policy and innovation but remained affiliated as Partner Emeritus with the firm until 2015 when he fully retired.

Gabrieli began his second career in education policy and innovation when he was selected in 1999 by then Boston Mayor Thomas Menino to Chair of a Task Force on After School in Boston which led to major expansion and field building of the after school domain in Boston. He went on to co-found Massachusetts 2020 and the National Center on Time & Learning which helped define and expand the field of expanded learning time (ELT) for schooling in America.

In 2008, he authored (with co-author Warren Goldstein) the book Time to Learn: How a New School Schedule is Making Smarter Kids, Happier Parents and Safer Neighborhoods, published by Jossey-Bass. He writes research and policy articles and opinion pieces on education policy and issues in various publications.

In 2011, Gabrieli co-founded Empower Schools, a new nonprofit focused on empowering district school educators to make key decisions that drive their schools' success. As part of that effort, he helped design and launch and became the chairman of the board of the Springfield Empowerment Zone Partnership, a partnership among the state's Department of Elementary & Secondary Education and Springfield Public Schools and the Springfield Education Association aimed at accelerating success for over 5,000 of Springfield's students. That work led to what is now 14 Empowerment Zones in five states (MA, CO, TX, IN and MO) and a burgeoning field of district-partnered schools and zones of schools.

In 2015, Chris Gabrieli was selected by Governor Charlie Baker for chairman of the board of the Massachusetts Department of Higher Education. His tenure has included the launch of Massachusetts’ Early College Initiative which has grown to include 23 partnerships of high schools and colleges approved by the state to offer well structured and supported opportunities to gain significant amounts of college success and credit while still in high school. As of 2020, these partnerships serve an estimated 3,500 students, the large majority of whom are Black or Latinx, the majority of whom are low-income and many of whom are first generation college goers.

He is also a part-time lecturer at the Harvard Graduate School of Education where he has taught for a decade, focusing on the political science of education policy change in America.

== Political experience ==
Gabrieli became involved in politics with a 1998 campaign for the Democratic primary in the Massachusetts's 8th congressional district, ultimately won by Mike Capuano. In 2002, he won the Democratic primary for Lieutenant Governor but the overall ticket lost to Mitt Romney in the general election. In 2006 he ran for Governor of Massachusetts, coming in second place in the gubernatorial primary behind eventual winner Deval Patrick. Patrick subsequently appointed him Chair of the Finance Control Board of Springfield, MA which resulted in the sustained fiscal recovery of Springfield following the completion of its role in 2010.

== Personal life ==
Chris Gabrieli lives in Boston with his wife Hilary where they raised their five, now young adult children.

Party political offices
Preceded by Warren Tolman	Democratic nominee for Lieutenant Governor of Massachusetts; 2002	Succeeded by Tim Murray
