= Charles Reis Felix =

American writer

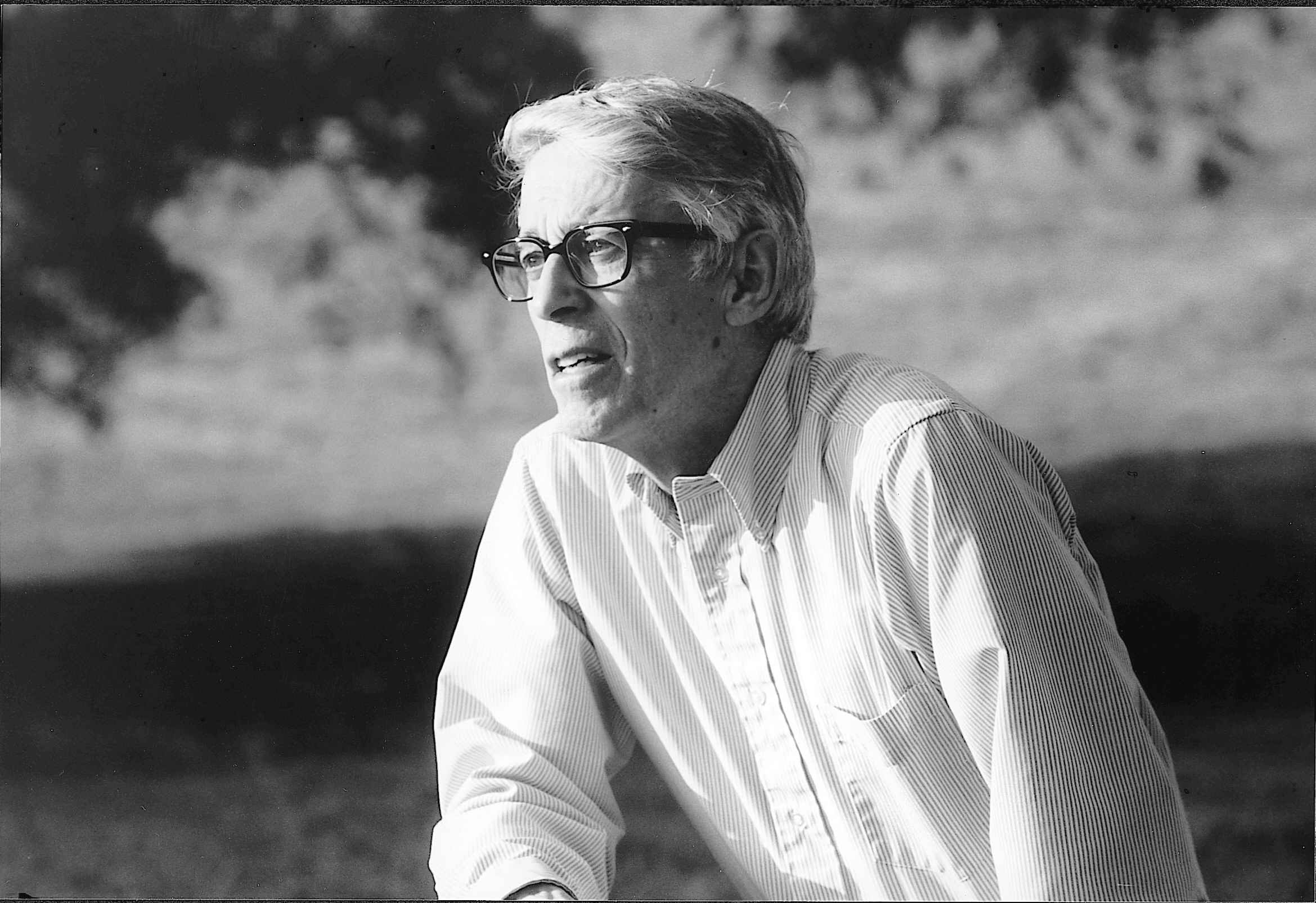
- Born: April 29, 1923; New Bedford, Massachusetts, U.S.
- Died: January 25, 2017 (aged 93); Palo Alto, California, U.S.
- Education: Stanford University; University of Michigan
- Occupation: Writer
- Writing career
- Language: English
- Genres: Fiction, memoir
- Website: www.charlesreisfelix.com

Charles Reis Felix (April 29, 1923 – January 25, 2017) was an American writer who was a prominent contributor to Luso-American literature.

== Biography ==
Charles Reis Felix was born in New Bedford, Massachusetts, one of four children of Portuguese immigrant parents. Felix's name on his birth certificate was the Portuguese "Carlos," but as a child he was referred to as "Charley." Felix grew up during the lean years of the Great Depression and graduated from New Bedford High School in 1941. He studied at the University of Michigan from 1941–43, until he was drafted into the U.S. Army.

After the war, Felix continued his undergraduate education, receiving a B.A. in History from Stanford University in Palo Alto, California. He became an elementary-school teacher and spent 31 years in the classroom, while returning to Massachusetts for family visits on occasion.

== Writings ==
Felix's work interweaves autobiography, historical narrative and fiction to depict the human experience. Felix's first book, Crossing the Sauer, was an account of his three months as a combat infantryman from January through March 1945. Crossing the Sauer was hailed by Paul Fussell as "one of the most honest, unforgettable memoirs of the war I've read.

His second book, 2004's Through a Portagee Gate, depicts his upbringing in New Bedford, and describes a relationship between the author and his father, Jose or "Joe" Felix, that resonates with many individuals of Portuguese ancestry in the United States. In fact, the University of Massachusetts Dartmouth presented a theatrical play version of Felix's book on his birthday in 2006, much to the delight of the author.

Felix's third book, Da Gama, Cary Grant, and the Election of 1934, dealt with local politics amid the ethnic enclaves of New Bedford, Massachusetts. In the book, Felix describes the candidacy of a Portuguese-American for local office, and his attempts to unseat the "All-American," Yankee incumbent. His last published book was Tony: A New England Boyhood.

The manuscripts and personal papers of Charles Reis Felix are held by The Ferreira-Mendes Portuguese American Archives, University of Massachusetts Dartmouth.

== Personal ==
Felix lived with his wife Barbara in a cabin among the redwoods of Northern California. They had two children. He died in January 2017 at the age of 93.

== Books ==
- Crossing the Sauer: a memoir of World War II (Burford Books, 2002)
- Through a portagee gate (University of Massachusetts Dartmouth, Center for Portuguese Studies and Culture, 2004)
- Da Gama, Cary Grant, and the election of 1934 (University of Massachusetts Dartmouth, Center for Portuguese Studies and Culture, 2005)
- Tony: a New England boyhood (University of Massachusetts Dartmouth, Center for Portuguese Studies and Culture, 2008)

== Translations ==
- Vasco da Gama, Cary Grant e as Eleições de 1934. Translation of Da Gama, Cary Grant, and the Election of 1934. Edited by Rui Zink and translated by Emília Madureira and Rui Zink. (EDEL Editora, 2011)
