= Chris Bender (singer) =

American R&B singer (1972–1991)

- Bender in 1991

Background information
- Born: Christopher Lamont Bender; August 2, 1972; Brockton, Massachusetts, U.S.
- Died: November 3, 1991 (aged 19) Brockton, Massachusetts, U.S.
- Genre: R&B
- Occupation: Singer
- Instrument: Vocal
- Years active: 1989–1991
- Labels: Epic Records, East West Records

Christopher Lamont Bender (August 2, 1972 – November 3, 1991) was an American R&B singer who reached the Billboard music charts in 1991 with the album titled Draped before his murder.

== Life and career ==
Christopher Lamont Bender was the youngest of six children to Andrew Bender, a construction worker and Betty Ann Bender, a nurse's aide. He was born on August 2, 1972, in Brockton, Massachusetts. Bender lived at the Crescent Court Housing Projects, his family were active in church and at the age of ten, Bender give an emotional performance of "Amazing Grace" which had his family in tears. Bender's musical influences were Michael Jackson, Prince, Sam Cooke, Marvin Gaye and New Edition. At the age of twelve, Bender met Bobby Jones who owned a studio and helped Bender develop his singing voice, and they were called The Next Generation with Robert L. Winstead as their manager. At the recording studio called Annie Mae Recording in the city of Brockton and Major recording studio called Normandy Sounds in Warren, Rhode Island, and at age 14, Bender formed a group with his two brothers and two cousins called "Steady Life", performing in Brockton. Bender was expelled from Brockton High School at 16 for fighting in school. He went to New York City and met Earl Williams who became his manager and signed a record deal with Epic Records in 1989.

Bender was from the Boston, Massachusetts area, residing in Brockton and Waltham. At the age of 16, Bender recorded his first album, Chris Bender, for Epic Records. The first single "Baby Girl" was released in 1989, but limited copies of the album were released. Bender's manager Terryl L. Calloway later stated that the video for "Baby Girl" was filmed but never released, and Epic Records removed Bender from the label. In 1991, Bender secured a $500,000 contract with East West Records. He signed a seven-album contract, although only one album on that contract was released before his death. The album Draped charted at number 92 on the Billboard R&B album chart. His two charted singles "I Knew" and "That's Not the Way" broke into the top 70 on the Hot R&B Singles chart. Other songs he was known for included "Who Will I Choose" and "Kiss and Make Up". His first single "I Knew" peaked at number 43 on Billboard's R&B singles chart, staying on there for ten weeks. The follow-up single "That's Not the Way" peaked at number 68 on the Billboard's Hot R&B singles chart, staying on the chart for five weeks. "I Knew" was his only officially released music video.

== Death ==
Two weeks before the murder, in 1991, Bender and his cousin Jesse Starks attended a house party in Milton street in Brockton, where Stephen "Sticks" Fernandes expressed hostility and unfriendly words towards Bender and his cousin, Starks which led to Bender and Fernandes having a heated argument. One week before the murder, Fernandes entered a store and had threatened Starks, saying he was going to take revenge on him and Bender.

On November 3, 1991, at 2:17 am, Bender was shot and killed in Brockton while sitting in his blue Mercedes Benz outside of the Crescent Court housing project where his mother lived. Bender was sitting in the driver's seat of the car. His 17-year-old cousin, Jesse Starks, was sitting in the passenger's seat. Bender and Starks were smoking marijuana and talking when three hooded men approached and fired 21 gunshots at the vehicle. Bender used his body to shield Starks from the gunshots. Starks was unharmed, but Bender was struck four times in the back of his torso and once in his elbow. He later died from his wounds in the hospital. On November 9, 1991, Bender was buried at Melrose Cemetery in Plymouth County in Brockton, Massachusetts. Eroy Kindell was convicted of second degree murder; he was released on parole in 2008. His accomplice Stephen "Sticks" Fernandes was convicted of first degree murder and sentenced to life without parole.

== Discography ==
=== Chris Bender (1989/CD) ===
1. "Teddy Bear"
2. "Baby Girl"
3. "Any Good Girls Left"
4. "Conceited Girl"
5. "Never Give Up on Me"
6. "That's How Love Happens"
7. "Intimate Lover"
8. "Go On and Love Your Lady"

=== Draped (1991 / CD) ===
1. "I Knew"
2. "Draped"
3. "It's All About You"
4. "Spellbound"
5. "Prelude... Stay Til the Morning"
6. "Don't Go Home"
7. "That's Not the Way"
8. "Sorry Didn't Do It"
9. "Who Will I Choose"
10. "Pouring Like Rain"
11. "Kiss and Make Up"
12. "Kiss and Make Up [The Apologize Mix]"

UPC 075679170828
