= B.M.C. Durfee High School =

Location
- 460 Elsbree Street; Fall River, Massachusetts 02720; United States; 41°42′55″N 71°7′16″W

Information
- Type: Public High School; Open enrollment
- Established: 1887
- School district: Fall River Public Schools
- Superintendent: Maria Pontes
- Principal: Dr. Jessica Stephens
- Teaching staff: 225.49 (FTE)
- Grades: 9–12
- Enrollment: 2,435 (2023–2024)
- Student to teacher ratio: 10.80
- Campus: Urban
- Campus size: 64 Acres
- Colors: Red & Black
- Athletics conference: MIAA Big Three League
- Nickname: Hilltoppers
- Rival: New Bedford, Somerset-Berkley
- Accreditation: New England Association of Schools and Colleges
- Newspaper: The Hilltop
- Website: B.M.C. Durfee High School

B.M.C. Durfee High School is a public high school located in the city of Fall River, Massachusetts, United States. It is a part of Fall River Public Schools and is the city's main public high school, the other being Diman Regional Vocational Technical High School.

== History ==
In 2014 the school and Bristol Community College (BCC) were planning an agreement regarding early college classes.

In the Fall of 2024, The Durfee High School Marching Band won the USBands National Championships on November 3 making it the first time in the School's history.

== Buildings ==
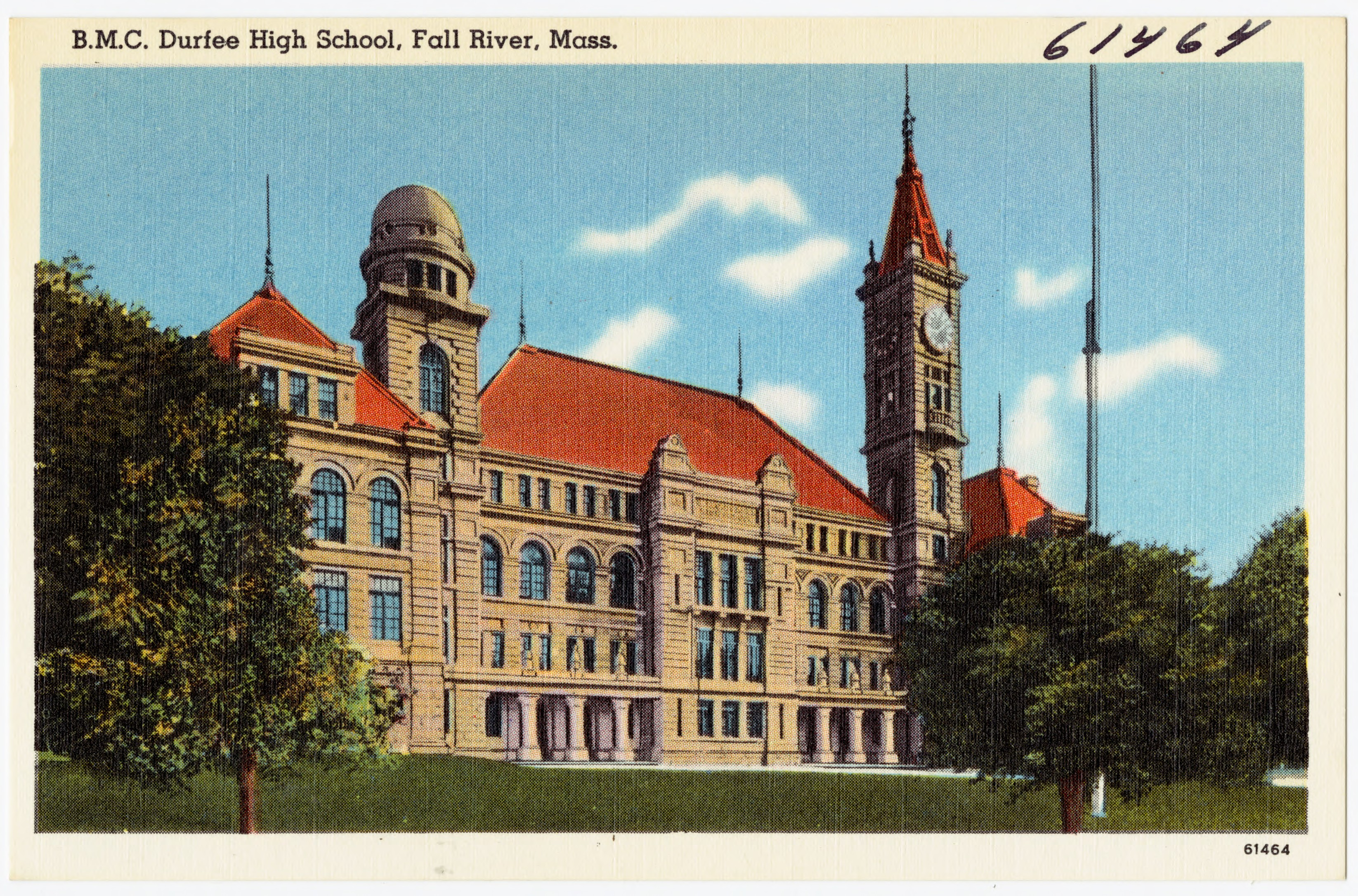
Postcard of previous Durfee school building

The school has been located in two buildings. From its opening in 1886 until the new building was completed in 1978 the school was located in the historic B.M.C. Durfee High School building on Rock Street, The iconic building, with its tall red-capped clock tower and red-domed observatory tower, overlooks the Taunton River and gives rise to the Fall River school district's seal, the school's athletics nickname, the Hilltoppers, their school colors of black and red (for the two roof colors), the school newspaper, the Hilltop, and their school alumni newspaper, the Chimes. The school also occupied the former Technical High School building across the street for several decades before moving.

Since 1978 the school has been located on Elsbree Street in the city's north end. Located in former swamp land, the school was built to modernize the district and alleviate the overcrowding at the former sites. The school also moved its athletic fields, which were nearby to the new school, to its new campus, and built the on-campus Luke Urban Field House, as the school had formerly used the Fall River Armory for indoor athletics. Since 2011, there has also been a modern recreation of the Durfee clock tower located at the new site. A new building, modeled off of the 1886 building, opened in 2021 that replaced a majority of the old building.

== Athletics ==
Durfee's athletic teams are known as the Hilltoppers, a nod to the location of the old school building atop the Highland neighborhood hills overlooking the Taunton River, and their school colors are black and red. As of the 2018–2019 school year, their school mascot is Rocky the Hilltopper. The school fight song is sung to the tune of the Notre Dame Victory March.

- Fall
  - Marching Band
  - Boys' and Girls' Cross Country
  - Boys' and Girls' Soccer
  - Cheerleading
  - Girls' Swimming
  - Girls' Volleyball
  - Football
  - Field hockey
  - Golf
- Winter
  - Indoor Percussion
  - Winter Guard
  - Boys' and Girls' Basketball
  - Boys' and Girls' Winter Track
  - Boys' Swimming
  - Cheerleading
  - Ice hockey
  - Wrestling
- Spring
  - Boys' and Girls' Outdoor Track
  - Boys' and Girls' Tennis
  - Boys' Volleyball
  - Baseball
  - Softball

== Notable alumni ==
Many of the below are considered distinguished alumni of Durfee by the B.M.C. Durfee Alumni Association.

- Mark Bomback, former MLB player (Milwaukee Brewers, New York Mets, Toronto Blue Jays)
- James Chace – (1949), historian
- Warren A. Cole – (1908), founder of Lambda Chi Alpha International Fraternity
- Morton Dean – (1953), American television news journalist
- Margery Eagan, journalist and writer
- Edward Francis Harrington – (1951), United States federal judge
- Tom Gastall – (1951), former MLB player (Baltimore Orioles)
- Russ Gibson, former MLB player (Boston Red Sox, San Francisco Giants)
- Brandon Gomes, former MLB player (Tampa Bay Rays)
- Chris Herren – (1994), former NBA player for the Denver Nuggets, Boston Celtics
- Sam Hyde, comedian, co-creator of sketch comedy group Million Dollar Extreme, and actor and writer of Adult Swim's Million Dollar Extreme Presents: World Peace
- Brig. Gen. John J. Liset, USAF – (1938), chief of the USAF Section of the Joint Brazil-United States Military Commission, and chief of the Air Force Section, Military Assistance Advisory Group in Brazil
- James M. McGuire – (1931), Supreme Court Justice of the State of New York
- Humberto Sousa Medeiros – (1937), cardinal of the Roman Catholic Church; former archbishop of Boston
- Ernest Moniz – (1962), United States Secretary of Energy under Barack Obama
- Wendy Moniz (Actress) – (1987), Film and TV Actress (Yellowstone, Tuesdays with Morrie, Daredevil)
- John Moriarty – (1948), vocal coach and accompanist and a conductor and stage director of productions at opera companies throughout America
- Beatrice Hancock Mullaney – (1923), first female judge of the Massachusetts Probate Court
- Jerome Namias – (1928), prominent American meteorologist; former Chief of the Extended Forecast Division of the National Weather Service and was involved in the research of both the Dust Bowl and El Niño phenomena
- William J. Porter – (1930), American diplomat; former ambassador to Canada, Saudi Arabia, and others
- Joseph Raposo – (1958), musician and lyricist for Sesame Street
- William K. Reilly – (1958), former administrator of the United States Environmental Protection Agency and current director of DuPont
- Andrew Sousa, former MLS Player (New England Revolution)
- James M. Swift – (18??), first head football coach at Michigan State Normal School (now Eastern Michigan University)
- Luke Urban, former MLB player (Boston Braves)
- Gen. Melvin Zais, US Army – (1933), decorated United States Army general

== See also ==
- List of high schools in Massachusetts
- B.M.C. Durfee High School (1886 building)
