= Brockton Public Schools =

School district serving Brockton, Massachusetts, US

Location
- 43 Crescent Street, Brockton, MA 02301 United States

District information
- Type: Public
- Grades: K-12
- Superintendent
- Schools: 24
- Budget: $252,609,245 total $14,209 per pupil (2016)

Students and staff
- Students: 15,348
- Teachers: 1,025
- Student–teacher ratio: 15.6 to 1

Other information
- Website: Brockton Public Schools

Brockton Public Schools (BPS) is the school district of Brockton, Massachusetts, United States. The Brockton Public Schools is the fifth largest school district in the Commonwealth of Massachusetts and serves among the most diverse student populations in the state.

== History ==
BPS has been at the forefront of the fight for equity in education. In 1993, the landmark McDuffy v. the Secretary of the Executive Office of Education in which Brockton student Jami McDuffy was the plaintiff pushed the state toward the passage of the Education Reform Act.

Nearly 25 years later, the district once again called on the state to fix its funding formula for Chapter 70 citing a significant drop in funding due to how the state calculates aid for low-income students. Advocacy by BPS staff, students and families working alongside education activists statewide led to the passage of the Student Opportunity Act (SOA). The SOA, signed into law on November 26, 2019, will infuse $1.5 billion into school districts, particularly districts with a higher proportion of low-income students, over the next seven years.

== Demographics ==
The Brockton school district has a diverse student population, with students representing 47 countries of origin. The most common countries of origin among students include Cape Verde, Haiti, Brazil, and Ecuador, while other represented countries include Afghanistan, Bangladesh, China, Greece, the Netherlands, and Venezuela. Approximately 84% of the district's students are students of color.

Collectively, Brockton students speak 38 languages, including Armenian, Amharic, Bengali, Ibo, Twi and Yoruba. The most prevalent languages spoken are Cape Verdean Creole, Haitian Creole, Spanish and Portuguese.

English is a second language for nearly half (44.3 percent) of Brockton students. The district educates 4,193 English Language Learners.

== Schools ==
Brockton is home to the largest high school and the only K-5 global studies school in the Commonwealth of Massachusetts.

=== High schools ===
- Brockton High School
- PROMISE College and Career Academy

=== K-8 schools ===
- Davis K-8 School

=== Middle schools ===
- Ashfield Middle School
- East Middle School
- North Middle School
- Plouffe Middle School
- South Middle School
- West Middle School

=== Primary schools ===
- Angelo School
- Arnone School
- Baker School
- Brookfield School
- Downey School
- Manthala George Jr. Global Studies School
- Gilmore School
- Hancock School
- Kennedy School
- Raymond School

=== Early childhood centers ===
- Barrett Russell Early Childhood Center

=== Alternative schools ===
- Brockton Champion High School
- Edison Academy at Brockton High School
- Frederick Douglass Academy
- Huntington Therapeutic School

=== Virtual schools ===
- Brockton Virtual Learning Academy
