= National Center on Time & Learning =

American non-profit organization

The National Center on Time & Learning
- Founder: Chris Gabrieli and Jennifer Davis
- Type: Education Non-profit
- Purpose: Education Reform: Expanding Learning Time
- Headquarters: Boston, Massachusetts
- Method: Technical Assistance and Advocacy
- Website: www.timeandlearning.org

The National Center on Time & Learning (NCTL) is a Boston-based non-profit dedicated to expanded learning time to improve student achievement and enable a well-rounded education. Through research and public policy, and technical assistance, NCTL supports national, state, and local initiatives that add significantly more school time for academic and enrichment opportunities to help all children meet the demands of the 21st century.

== History of NCTL ==
The National Center on Time & Learning was launched in October 2007 at an event at the Center for American Progress in Washington, D.C., featuring Senator Ted Kennedy. NCTL grew out of the work of a Boston-based nonprofit, Massachusetts 2020, which led the first statewide expanded learning time grant program in the country. NCTL was formed to expand that work to more states and to develop policies at the federal level to support expanded learning time in schools. In 2010, the National Center on Time & Learning became the official organization name and Massachusetts 2020 became its state affiliate.

=== History of Massachusetts 2020 ===
Chris Gabrieli, a civic and business entrepreneur, and Jennifer Davis, former Deputy Assistant Secretary at the U.S. Department of Education, founded Massachusetts 2020 (Mass 2020) in 2000 out of concern that the traditional American school calendar did not provide students sufficient time for learning, especially for students from disadvantaged backgrounds.

Initial efforts to provide more learning opportunities focused on expanding and strengthening after-school and summer programs for children across the Commonwealth of Massachusetts. Mass 2020 launched Boston's After-School for All Partnership, the largest public-private partnership in Boston's history with over $26 million dedicated to children; the Keeping Kids on Track Statewide Campaign in partnership with the five largest United Way organizations in Massachusetts; the statewide Middle School Initiative in partnership with Citizen Schools and several private funders; the Transition to Success Pilot project; the School Sites Initiative, which is working with Boston schools; the After-School Literacy Coaching Initiative in Boston; and Partners for Student Success, now managed by Boston After School & Beyond.

In 2004, Mass 2020 partnered with a number of education and civic leaders to file an amicus brief in connection with the Hancock v. Driscoll school financing case, in which they argued that equity for poor school children came not only in the form of providing more money to equalize opportunity, but also more learning time. Mass 2020 then entered the field of education reform more directly when, in 2005, the Massachusetts Legislature funded planning grants for traditional district schools to convert to a school calendar and schedule that were up to 30 percent more hours (annually). This initiative became known as the Massachusetts Expanded Learning Time Initiative, for which Mass 2020 provided intensive technical assistance to planning schools as well as advocacy and public policy support. The following year, the Legislature allocated $6.5 million for schools to significantly more hours to their school day and/or year, and Mass 2020 continued to provide technical assistance to the 10 implementing schools. The participating schools in the ELT Initiative have flexibility in how to use time, but are required to add time for core academic subjects, enrichment opportunities, and more planning and professional development time for teachers.

The number of schools participating in the ELT Initiative has remained relatively stable since 2009. In school year 2012–2013, the grant supported 19 schools in 9 districts to add 300 hours to their school year. The ELT Initiative has grown into a model for other states; New York Governor Andrew Cuomo, included expanded learning time in his proposal which cited the MA ELT Initiative. Governor Deval Patrick proposed substantially expanding the program over the next three years in his fiscal year 2014 budget, which was dependent on new tax revenue. The final fiscal year budget funds the ELT Initiative at $14.1 million.

=== Researching and sharing promising practices ===
NCTL studies high-performing expanded-time schools and documents the key practices that contribute to their success through publications, webinars, convenings, and technical assistance sessions. Additionally, NCTL's Expanded-Time Schools Database offers valuable information about the more than 1,000 schools nationwide that are now innovating with expanded learning time.

- Publications:
  - Case Studies
    - Clarence Edwards Middle School
    - Kuss Middle School
    - Orchard Gardens K–8 Pilot School
    - Tumbleweed Elementary School
  - Featured Articles
    - Education Leadership: More Time, More Learning
    - Education Leadership: Time – It's Not Always Money
  - Massachusetts
    - Listening to Experts: What MA Teachers are Saying about ELT
    - MA Expanded Learning Time Initiative (2010)
    - MA Expanded Learning Time Initiative (2011 Update)
  - Promising Practices
    - Strengthening Science Education
    - Time Well Spent
    - Time for Deeper Learning
    - Advancing Arts Education
  - Public Policy
    - Learning Time in America
    - Learning Time in America Update
  - Research
    - Case for Improving and Expanding Time in School
    - Time & Learning in Schools: A National Profile
    - Time for a Change
    - Mapping the Field

=== Advancing public policy ===
NCTL works with federal, state, and local leaders to help create public policies that support districts and schools as they redesign their school day and year. The federal government has adopted expanded learning time as an integral part of school reform, weaving it into the U.S. Department of Education's school improvement programs, especially the School Improvement Grant, a Title I program. With broad support, expanded learning time also has been included in bipartisan education legislation, including the leading proposals to reauthorize the Time Time Matters in Education Act.

=== Engaging states and districts ===
The TIME Collaborative: The Ford Foundation and NCTL joined together to launch the TIME Collaborative on December 3, 2012 in Washington, DC. Through the Collaborative, select public schools in Colorado, Connecticut, Massachusetts, New York, and Tennessee will significantly expand and redesign their school calendars. The states will use a mix of federal and state funding to cover the cost of adding 300 hours of instruction and enrichment to the school year, and will receive technical assistance from NCTL and capacity building grants from the Ford Foundation.

The Massachusetts Expanded Learning Time Initiative: Currently, NCTL is working with 19 schools across the Commonwealth to help plan and implement 300 additional hours to the school year.

=== Building support ===
The Time to Succeed Coalition (TSC) was a partnership between NCTL and the Ford Foundation. TSC launched on May 10, 2012, with a mission: to inspire and motivate communities across the country to add more learning time to a redesigned school day and year, enabling children everywhere – especially in disadvantaged schools – to get the education they need to succeed. TSC merged into Harvard University's Education Redesign Lab in fall 2018.
