= Fall River Public Schools =

Public school system of Fall River, Massachusetts

Location
- 417 Rock Street, Fall River, MA 02720 United States

District information
- Type: Public; Open enrollment
- Grades: K-12
- Superintendent: Dr Tracy Curley
- Schools: 18
- Budget: $169,647,442 total $14,633 per pupil (2016)

Students and staff
- Students: 10,246
- Teachers: 717
- Student–teacher ratio: 14.4 to 1

Other information
- Website: Fall River Public Schools

Fall River Public Schools (FRPS) is a school district headquartered in Fall River, Massachusetts.

Thanks to a long-term effort on the part of the city, the school system has been involved in a consolidation effort, bringing the total number of elementary schools down from twenty-eight as recently as the 1990s to nine (soon to be ten) today: Spencer Borden Elementary in the southern Highlands, John J. Doran Elementary in the downtown area, Mary L. Fonseca Elementary in the Flint, William S. Greene Elementary near the city's center, Alfred S. Letourneau in the Maplewood neighborhood, Frank M. Silvia Elementary in the far North End, James Tansey Elementary in the middle Highlands, Carlton M. Viveiros Elementary in the South End, and Samuel Watson Elementary in the lower Flint. Of the old twenty-eight, only Watson, Tansey and Doran remain in their original buildings; Silvia was relocated from its old location downtown to a new building in the northern part of the city, and the other five were rebuilt on the sites of their original schools. Also, most of the closed school names (except for Wiley and Dubuque) live on in the schools they were consolidated into. It was announced that for the 2024-2025 school year that the district will be reopening one of their former elementary schools, Westall Elementary.

There are three middle schools: Matthew J. Kuss Middle School (which was relocated to the west side of the city), James Morton Middle School (serving the North End), and Edmond P. Talbot Middle School (serving the east side of the city). The site of the former Henry Lord Middle School now serves as an elementary and middle school named Henry Lord Community School.

The city has one public high school, B.M.C. Durfee High School. The school was founded in 1886, replacing an older high school. The original grand school building was a gift of Mrs. Mary B. Young, in the name of Bradford Matthew Chaloner Durfee, her late son, whose name also graces a dormitory at Yale University. The current school building was opened in 1978, and it was recently announced that a replica of the Durfee Chimes, the original school's red-capped bell tower, will be recreated on the grounds.

Durfee's teams wear black and red (in honor of the old school's black roof and red observatory dome and tower spire), and are called the Hilltoppers, sometimes shortened to Toppers. The nickname dates back to the old school's perch on top of the hill north of the Quequechan River. The school is a member of the Southeast Conference.

== Schools ==
Early  Education:

- Early Learning Center
- Fall River Learning Center

Elementary schools:

- Spencer Borden Elementary School
- Mary L. Fonseca Elementary School
- William S. Greene Elementary School
- Alfred S. Letourneau Elementary School
- Frank M. Silvia Elementary School
- James Tansey Elementary School
- Carlton M. Viveiros Elementary School
- Samuel Watson Elementary School
- Westall Elementary School

Middle schools:

- Matthew J. Kuss Middle School
- James Madison Morton Middle School
- Edmond P. Talbot Middle School

Combination schools

- Alfred S. Letourneau Elementary School (K-6) (multi year transition to K-8)
- Henry Lord Community School (grades K-8)
- John J. Doran Community School (grades K-8)
- Resiliency Preparatory School (grades 7-12)
- Stone Therapeutic Day School (grades K-12)

High schools:

- B.M.C. Durfee High School
