= Luis Ubiñas =

American businessman (born 1963)

- Born: 1963 (age 62–63)
- Education: Harvard University (BA, MBA)
- Occupations: Businessman and nonprofit advisor
- Spouse: Deborah Tolman

Luis Antonio Ubiñas (born 1963) is an American investor, businessman and nonprofit leader. He holds various influential roles in both the corporate and nonprofit sectors. Currently, he is the Chairman of the Statue of Liberty-Ellis Island Foundation, which is dedicated to preserving American immigration history. Ubiñas served as the president of the Ford Foundation from 2008 through 2013 and had an 18-year career as a senior partner at McKinsey & Company before joining the Ford Foundation. In the corporate world, he is actively involved as a board member of several public and private corporations, including Electronic Arts, where he serves as Lead Director and chairs the Nominating and Governance Committee, as well as ATT and Tanger. Additionally, he provides advice to various private companies, such as Ebsco, a digital information provider. In the nonprofit sector, he served as president of the Board of Trustees of the Pan American Development Foundation from 2015 to 2019, and serves as an Advisory Committee member for the United Nations Fund for International Partnership. His is an avid collector, donor, and board member.

== Early life ==
Ubiñas grew up in the South Bronx in New York City. His mother, a native of Puerto Rico, was a seamstress. His father, also from Puerto Rico, died when Ubiñas and his four siblings were young. He is an alumnus of A Better Chance, a non-profit which assists gifted young people of color attend highly ranked secondary schools. Ubiñas is a first-generation college student who graduated magna cum laude from Harvard University in 1985 with a degree in government. At Harvard, he roomed with Conan O'Brien. He was a Truman Scholar. In 1989, he graduated from Harvard Business School as a Baker Scholar with highest honors.

== Career ==
Luis has led a career in business, philanthropy and the nonprofit sector and has served in a range of government roles. He has been a Senior Partner at McKinsey, President of the Ford Foundation, and a board member of AT&T. He is now an investor and entrepreneur.

=== McKinsey & Company ===
Ubiñas spent eighteen years at McKinsey & Company as a Senior Partner in the areas of telecommunications, technology and media. He helped found the Media Practice at McKinsey, where he led the practice on the West Coast; his work centered on the introduction and development of the underlying capabilities and applications of internet technologies, both wired and wireless.

=== Ford Foundation ===
Ubiñas served as president of the Ford Foundation from January 2008 through 2013. During his tenure as president, Ubiñas significantly restructured the organization. The restructuring effort focused the foundation's number of program areas from over 200 to 35, and defined eight major issues, including access to education, economic opportunity and human rights, as its core objectives. Ubiñas increased the Ford Foundation's focus on social justice issues. He also spearheaded reinvestment of over 80% of the Foundation's endowment, moving its endowment performance from bottom quartile to top quartile performance among endowments over $3 billion, renovated the network of international offices and modernized the Foundation's systems. During his tenure operating costs fell 33%. Most importantly, Ubinas focused the Foundation's programs on Social Justice issues.

Restructuring during the 2008/9 financial crisis was not without controversy, since, a few months after announcing $22 million in budget cutbacks in spring 2009, Ford announced the closure of field offices in Vietnam and Russia and offered voluntary severance packages to some New York staff to trim an additional $14 million from the budget. All savings were shifted to the grantee budget, to help social justice organizations in the United States and abroad survive the financial crisis.

=== Pan American Development Foundation ===
From 2015 to 2019, Ubiñas served as the president of the Board of Trustees of the Pan American Development Foundation, an organization that works with governments, non-profit organizations and corporations to fund and administer development projects in Central and South America and the Caribbean.

=== Other activities ===
Ubiñas is Chairman of the Statue of Liberty-Ellis Island Foundation and serves on the Board of the New York Public Library, where he is a member of the Executive Committee and Chair of the Finance Committee. He serves as an Advisory Committee Member for the United Nations Fund for International Partnerships which overseas the United Nations' relationships with non-governmental partners, where he is in his sixth term, appointed by two Secretaries General. His government service includes terms on the Advisory Committee for Trade Policy and Negotiation, the Advisory Committee for the Export-Import Bank of the United States, and as Northwest Regional Chair for White House Fellows. He has held top-secret national security clearance.

In the private sector, Ubinas is a Lead Director at Electronic Arts and serves on the Boards of two other public companies: AT&T, the connectivity company, and Tanger, the real estate investment trust. He is also a Trustee of the Mercer Funds. Ubiñas has served as a board member of and/or investor in multiple privately held companies, including GFR Media, the largest media company in Puerto Rico; Shorelight Education, which provides educational access for international students; and CommerceHub, a cloud-based e-commerce platform. He is currently an advisor to the board of EBSCO industries, the leading provider of full text academic content to libraries, universities and private sector entities.

== Personal life ==
His wife, Deborah Tolman, is a developmental psychologist and a feminist scholar. They have two sons.
