= Pan American Development Foundation =

U.S-based non-profit organization

- Abbreviation: PADF
- Founded: 1962
- Founder: Ronald Scheman
- Type: International Development Organization
- Location: Washington, D.C., United States
- Region served: Latin America, Caribbean
- Key people: Katie Taylor, Executive Director
- Website: www.padf.org

The Pan American Development Foundation (PADF) is a non-governmental and non-political organization created in 1962 by the Organization of American States (OAS), the public sector and the private sector to focus on issues of pressing concern in the Western Hemisphere. PADF, a non-profit organization, has worked in every country in the region. PADF aims to bring together stakeholders to create sustainable economic development, strengthen civil society and respond to natural disasters for the most disadvantaged people in Latin America and the Caribbean.

PADF, which also works to support the principles of the Inter-American Democratic Charter, is an independent affiliate of the OAS.

== History ==
The PADF was established in 1962, by the Organization of American States (OAS), as part of the Alliance for Progress initiated by U.S. President John F. Kennedy. It was created through a cooperative agreement between the OAS and private enterprise to provide a specialized non-governmental organization to assist the least advantaged people in Latin America and the Caribbean. Since its creation, PADF has implanted development programs throughout the Western Hemisphere carrying out the goals set forth by the OAS.

In 1975, OAS named PADF a "special purpose foundation" achieving consultative status with the United Nations.

== Programs ==
In keeping with its mission to create "a Hemisphere of Opportunity for All", PADF implements a range of different programs, reaching millions of people in Latin American and the Caribbean. The programs are divided into four areas of development.

=== Economic opportunity programs ===
PADF implements economic opportunity programs with the focus of improving the livelihoods of disadvantaged individuals and families. The programs include support for micro and medium-size businesses, skills training for youth and vulnerable groups, improving agricultural conditions and techniques, and expanding or improving local infrastructure.

==== LEAD program ====
In 2012, PADF implemented the Leveraging Effective Application of Direct Investment (LEAD) program with $13 million in funding from the United States Agency for International Development (USAID). The LEAD program is a business plan competition which awards grants to small and medium enterprises. The grants range from $50,000 to $200,000 and must be matched be the grantee.

PADF announced the launch of the second edition of the LEAD Program on February 20, 2013. Following the launch of the second round, a group of Haitian businesses, which had been awarded LEAD grants, participated in a business and investment seminar at Columbia University. The event is part of a series of investment events and conferences that the businesses are participating in throughout the United States, Canada and the Dominican Republic.

=== Community and civil society programs ===
Throughout Latin America and the Caribbean, PADF partners with civil society organizations on programs intended to increase their capacity to respond to community needs. Civil society programming aims to enhance democratic values and empower communities and social entrepreneurs. It also promotes human rights, especially for Afro-descendants, indigenous and other vulnerable groups.

=== Social progress programs ===
PADF initiates programs, often with partnership from private corporations and donors, to confront social issues and strengthen communities in many Latin American and Caribbean nations. PADF has implemented programs aimed at community-driven development, improving infrastructure and housing, upgrading technical training and health services, aiding at-risk youth, and combating human trafficking, gang activities and violence.

=== Natural disaster programs ===
PADF works with local non-governmental organizations and communities to prepare for disasters, taking systematic precautions to reduce the risk of potential disasters. The programs are designed to lessen the impact of disasters and crises by: helping communities prepare for disasters; providing emergency relief; assisting disaster recovery, reconstruction and mitigation; strengthening community responses to natural disasters; supporting the Inter-American Committee for Disaster Reduction (IACDR); and aiding victims or humanitarian crises.

PADF also responds to natural disasters and implements disaster relief programs in Latin America and the Caribbean. PADF has provided disaster relief assistance to communities in Brazil, Chile, Costa Rica, El Salvador, Guatemala, Haiti, Honduras, Jamaica, Nicaragua, Colombia, Panama, St. Lucia and Venezuela.

==== 2010 Haiti earthquake response ====
On January 12, 2010, an earthquake with a scale of 7.0 struck Haiti just 10 miles west of the capital, Port-au-Prince. According to Haitian government estimations, the earthquake killed or injured 616,000 people, damaged or destroyed 250,000 residences, and left 1,000,000 people homeless.

COVID-19 response

Following the spread of the COVID-19 Pandemic, PADF's social media presence has been largely centered around of public education and awareness. Their posts showcase precautionary measures, dispelled myths regarding the virus, provision of mental health resources, and continuous acknowledgement of breakthroughs in international human rights and transitional justice. Efforts include the creation and sharing of posters and related videos (including a hand-washing music video by Haitian artist BIC) in English, Haitian-Creole and Spanish for Latin American and Caribbean/Haitian audiences.

PADF launched an emergency fund to support 650 million people across Latin America and the Caribbean who are at risk of health-related, economic, and social impacts of the pandemic. With over 60 years of experience, financial resources, and ties to communities across these regions, PADF helped people through mobile and e-vouchers.

== Funding ==
PADF is a 501(c)(3) tax-exempt organization in the United States. It receives donations from individuals, corporations, multilateral organizations (such as the World Bank, the UN, the Inter-American Development Bank, among others) and governments. It is audited each year and an annual statement is published in its annual report.
