= Paul Reville =

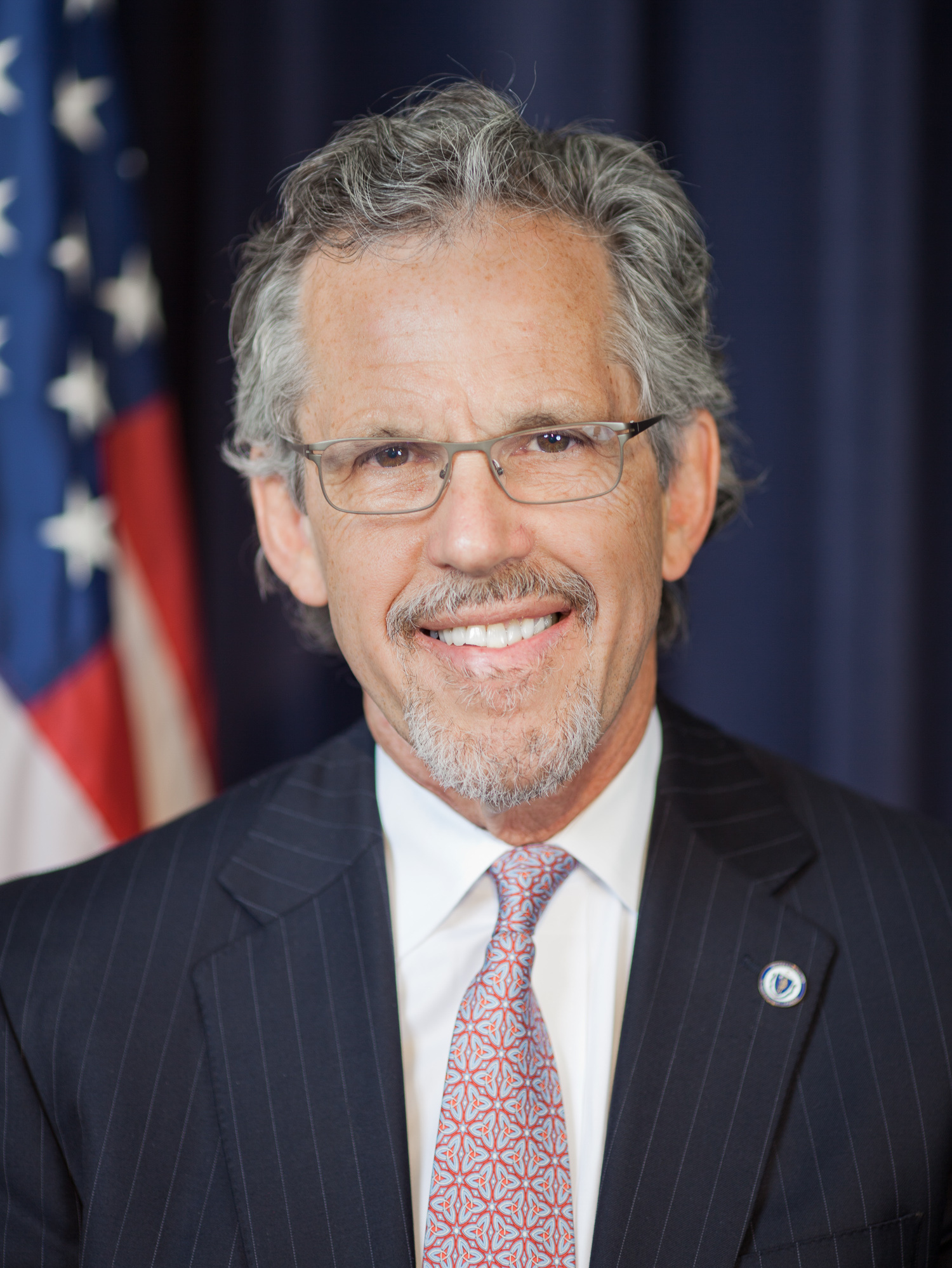
- Official portrait, 2012

Massachusetts Secretary of Education
- In office 2008–2013
- Governor: Deval Patrick
- Preceded by: office established
- Succeeded by: Matthew Malone

Paul Reville is an American politician, teacher, school principal, and educational researcher who was the Massachusetts Secretary of Education from 2008 to 2013 under Governor Deval Patrick. He currently serves as the Francis Keppel Professor of Practice of Educational Policy and Administration at the Harvard Graduate School of Education.

== Biography ==
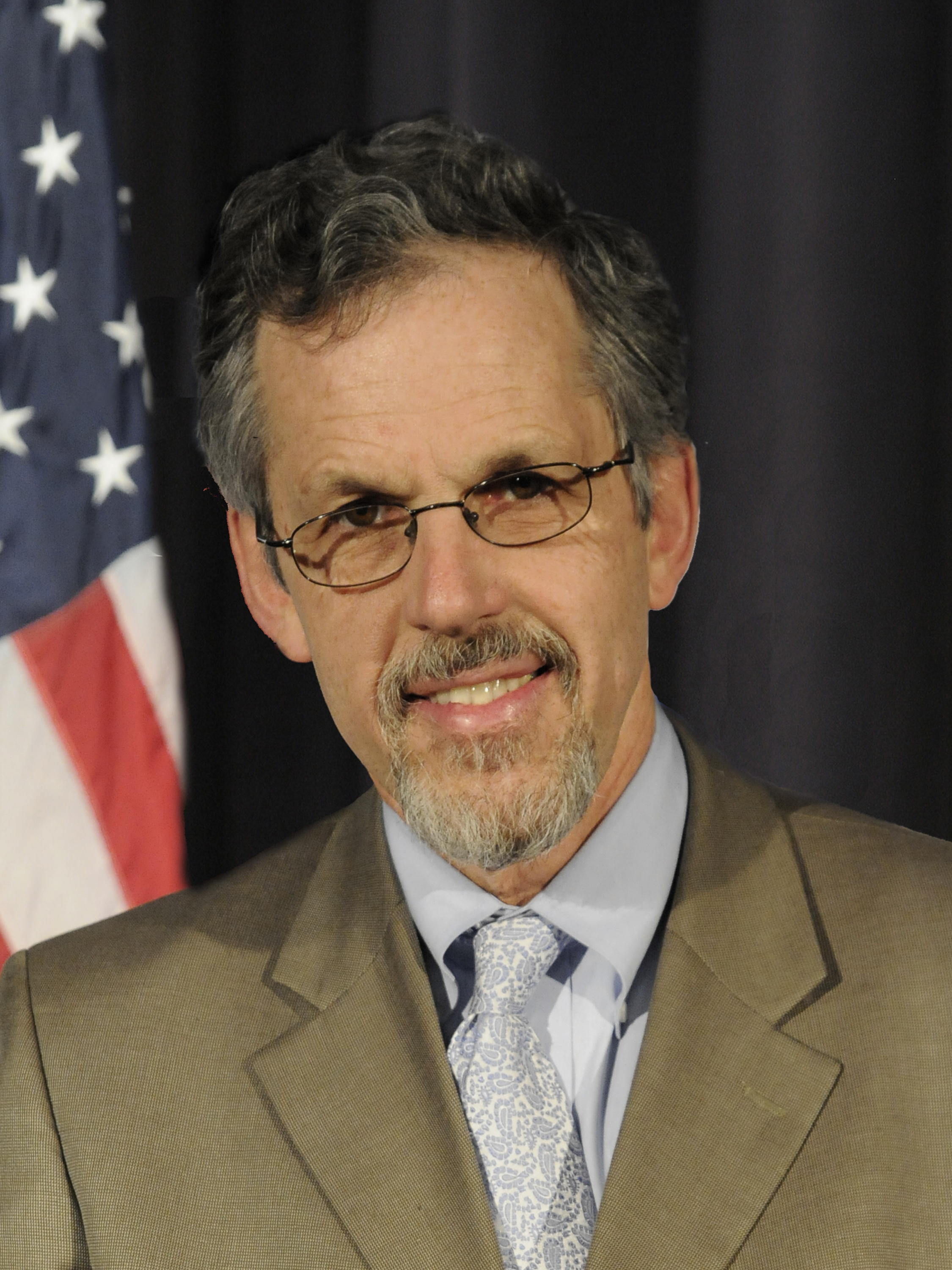
Official portrait, circa 2008

Paul Reville is the Francis Keppel Professor of Practice of Educational Policy and Administration at the Harvard Graduate School of Education (HGSE). He is the founding director of HGSE's EdRedesign Lab. In 2013, he served nearly half a decade as the Secretary of Education for the Commonwealth of Massachusetts. As Governor Patrick's top education adviser, Reville established a new Executive Office of Education and oversaw higher education, K-12, and early education in the nation's leading student achievement state. He served in the Governor's Cabinet and played a leading education reform role on matters ranging from the Achievement Gap Act of 2010 and Common Core State Standards to the Commonwealth's highly successful Race to the Top proposal.

Before joining the Patrick Administration, Reville chaired the Massachusetts State Board of Education, founded the Rennie Center for Education Research and Policy, co-founded the Massachusetts Business Alliance for Education (MBAE), chaired the Massachusetts Reform Review Commission, chaired the Massachusetts Commission on Time and Learning, and served as executive director of the Pew Forum on Standards-Based Reform, a national think tank which convened the U.S.'s leading researchers, practitioners, and policymakers to set the national standards agenda. Reville played a central role in MBAE's development of and advocacy for Massachusetts historic Education Reform Act of 1993. Reville has been a member of the HGSE faculty since 1997 and has served as director of the Education Policy and Management Program.

Reville's career, which combines research, policy, and practice, began with service as a VISTA volunteer/youth worker. He was a teacher and principal of two urban, alternative high schools. Some years later, he founded a local education foundation, which was part of the Public Education Network. He is a board member and adviser to various organizations, including BELL, Match Education, Bellwether, City Year Boston, Harvard Medical School's MEDscience and others. He is a frequent writer and speaker on education reform and policy issues. He is also the educator commentator, Boston Public Radio, WGBH. Paul Reville holds a Bachelor of Arts from Colorado College and a Master of Arts from Stanford University, along with five honorary doctorate degrees.

== Associations ==
- Chair, Massachusetts Board of Education, Commonwealth of Massachusetts,(2002-2008)
- Secretary of Education, Commonwealth of Massachusetts,(2008-2013)
- WGBH, Bi-weekly Commentator, Boston Public Radio
- National Education Association (NEA) Foundation, Senior Fellow
- Boston Public Schools Superintendent Tommy Chang's Transition Team, Member
- Massachusetts Foundation Budget Review Commission, Gubernatorial Appointee
- Bellwether, Board of Directors, Member
- BELL, Chair, Massachusetts Leadership Council
- Rennie Center for Research and Policy, Board Member
- MedScience, Harvard Medical School, Board Chair
- Boston After School and Beyond, Board Member
- PEAR, Harvard Medical School, National Advisory Council, Member
- Massachusetts Business Alliance for Education, Honorary Board Member
- National Center on Time and Learning, Chair, National Advisory Council
- Wheelock College, Corporator
- Debate Mate, Board Member
- Massachusetts Department of Elementary & Secondary Education and the Institute of Research, Advisory Committee on District & School Accountability
- College for Social Innovation, Advisory Board
- Enterprise Cities, Babson Global Inc., Academic Advisory Council, Member
- New Profit, Reimagine Education, Domain Member

== Criticism ==
During his tenure as Massachusetts Secretary of Education, Reville faced calls for resignation over his promotion of charter schools. By contrast, Reville himself has criticized the prevalence of for-profit charter schools in Michigan in 2016.
