= Citizen Schools =

US non-profit organisation

- Founded: 1995
- Founder: Eric Schwarz and Ned Rimer, Co-Founders
- Location: Boston, Massachusetts
- Key people: Emily McCann, CEO; Kait Rogers, "Chief Financial and Administrative Officer"; Pat Kirby, Chief Growth Officer and MA Executive Director; Maria Drake, CA Executive Director; Jeanette Castellanos Butt, IL Executive Director; Megan Bird, MA Executive Director; Vanessa Benton, NC Executive Director; Wendy Lee, NY Executive Director; Greg Meyers, TX Executive Director
- Website: www.citizenschools.org

Citizen Schools is an American nonprofit organization that partners with middle schools across the United States to expand the learning day for children in low-income communities. Its stated mission is "educating children and strengthening communities". Currently, Citizen Schools serves over 5,000 students and recruits over 4,280 volunteers over 31 program sites in 13 cities across 7 states. The center pieces of the Citizen Schools model are its apprenticeship programs run by volunteers that culminate in public demonstrations called WOW!s, and partnering with some middle schools to expand learning time for students. Citizen Schools once offered the AmeriCorps National Teaching Fellowship providing a 2-year paid service opportunity for citizens interested in using their personal talents to enhance life opportunities for middle school students. However, amid major changes following the pandemic, Citizen Schools Fellows now serve for one year and are less involved in the classroom.

== History ==
Citizen Schools was founded by Eric Schwarz and Ned Rimer who were college roommates at the University of Vermont. Concerned with the rise of youth crime, struggling neighborhoods, and challenges within public schools in Boston, Eric and Ned sought to educate middle school age children through hands-on apprenticeships in real-world fields. In 1994, they volunteered to teach apprenticeships based on their professional knowledge to 20 students at Dorchester's Paul A. Dever Elementary School. As a former reporter, Eric led an apprenticeship in journalism while Ned taught first aid after having run the EMT squad at the University of Vermont. In early 1995, Citizen Schools formally registered as a non-profit organization. The first full program was launched that summer, serving 63 children. Schwarz and Rimer's first employee, John Werner, led the first school partnership; Werner created and scaled the capstone 8th Grade Academy program, founded the writing coach program and oversaw the Expanded Learning Time pilot.

Within a year, the basic elements were in place: after-school programs operating out of Boston public school buildings, apprenticeships taught by community volunteers, explorations into the community, focused time to develop academic skills, and team building activities to develop social skills. Citizen Schools grew initially in Boston, wanting to prove the model in Boston to establish itself as a leader in quality programming before expanding geographically. "To have impact on a huge scale, you do not necessarily need to have the dominant market share," says Schwarz. "We need to remain a big fish in Boston, and we can then leverage those resources, ideas, and our model to other educational entrepreneurs [beyond Boston]." In fall of 2001, the organization started its 8th Grade Academy in Boston to support Citizen Schools participants in preparing to transition to high school and college. The organization grew significantly in 2002, opening affiliate sites outside of Boston in Framingham and Worcester, as well as in Texas and California.

In the same year, Citizen Schools began its partnership with AmeriCorps. In 2003, Lesley University in Cambridge launched a partnership with Citizen Schools to enable staff to graduate with a Master's in Education with a Specialization in Out of School Time (OST) Education. This program is no longer in operation, and it is not possible to earn a teaching certification through Citizen Schools. In 2006, Citizen Schools became the lead non-profit partner at two schools in Massachusetts that piloted Expanded Learning Time for all their students. From 2006 to 2008, Citizen Schools launched programs at new sites in North Carolina, New Mexico, New Jersey and New York.

== Apprenticeships ==
Citizen Schools recruits volunteers, called Citizen Teachers, from businesses, civic institutions, and communities and trains them to teach elements of their professional or avocational experiences. Taught in 90-minute sessions twice a week for 11-weeks, the apprenticeships emphasize skills considered necessary for success in the modern economy: leadership, teamwork, oral communication and technology. Each semester's apprenticeships culminate in a product, performance, or presentation produced by the students and taught back to the community at an event called a WOW!. Currently, for the spring semester of 2010, Citizen Schools is operating 474 apprenticeships across its 37 sites.

Citizen Schools also operates their own site devoted to apprenticeships, called CT Nation Labeled "The online community for Citizen Schools volunteers", the site provides a workspace for volunteers—Citizen Teachers—and Citizen Schools' staff to discuss current apprenticeships and prospects for future ones. The site also maintains a blog for CTs past and present to reflect on their experiences working with Citizen Schools and students across the country.

== Expanded Learning Time (ELT) ==
In the 110th and 111th Congresses, the U.S. House of Representatives and U.S. Senate adopted bills calling for National Expanded Learning Time or ELT. Schools adopting ELT expand the amount of time students spend in school by lengthening the school day and/or year. The Commonwealth of Massachusetts, in partnership with Massachusetts 2020, which aims to "expand and improve learning opportunities for children across" Massachusetts, created an Extended Learning Time pilot program in 2006. Through the ELT initiative, schools agree "to increase learning time for their students by at least 30% in exchange for an increase in their state per-pupil funding". Since 2006, Citizen Schools has partnered with the Edwards Middle School in Charlestown and the Salemwood School in Malden to extend the school day for all their students. In the fall of 2009, the Garfield Middle School in Revere also extended their school day in partnership with Citizen Schools.

On all of its ELT campuses, Citizen Schools provides students with daily homework time, volunteer-led apprenticeships, a study skills class, and experiential field trips. At the Edwards Middle School in Charlestown, Citizen Schools staff also facilitate a school-wide initiative to boost math skills through a combination of collaborative math games and time for math homework completion. From 2006 to 2009, math proficiency at the Edwards more than doubled and the school has reduced the achievement gap for 8th graders in math and ELA by more than 50%. A 2008 Boston Globe column called the ELT initiative "a success Massachusetts should be proud of...and a program that deserves to grow".

== Partnerships ==
Citizen Schools has recently partnered with financial institutions such as Bank of America and with technology corporations like Google who have made major financial investments in addition to leading a variety of apprenticeships. In 2008, Bank of America committed $1 million to help support Citizen Schools' national expansion in addition to providing local grants to support programs in Massachusetts, New York and North Carolina. In California, Bank of America recognized Citizen Schools as a Neighborhood Builder and awarded Citizen Schools $200,000 over two years as part of their Neighborhood Excellence Initiative. Since 2006, Google has taught more than 40 apprenticeships at campuses in California, Massachusetts and New York. At the Brooklyn School for Global Studies, Google programmers provided the first opportunity for middle school students in the United States to work with the Android platform. Google also host WOW! Events and Citizen Schools fundraisers at their corporate offices in Mountain View, California and New York City and provides a Citizen Schools channel on YouTube to showcase their work with students.

== Acclaim ==
In 2008, Fast Company magazine listed Citizen Schools as one of its "45 Social Entrepreneurs Who are Changing the World" while the Teaching Fellowship and Team Leader positions are included in the "Best Entry Level Jobs" by the Princeton Review.
