= Massachusetts Interscholastic Athletic Association =

Sports organization in Massachusetts

- Abbreviation: MIAA
- Formation: 1978
- Purpose: Athletic
- Location: Franklin, Massachusetts
- Region served: Massachusetts
- Members: 380+ schools
- Executive Director: Bob Baldwin
- President: Thomas Arria
- Vice President: Charlie Conefrey
- Website: miaa.net

The Massachusetts Interscholastic Athletic Association (MIAA) is an organization that sponsors activities in 36 sports, between more than 380 high schools in the U.S. state of Massachusetts. The MIAA serves over 220,000 student athletes from these schools. The MIAA is a member of the National Federation of State High School Associations (NFHS), which writes the rules for most U.S. high school sports and activities. The MIAA was founded in 1978, and was preceded by both the Massachusetts Secondary School Principals Association (MSSPA) (1942–1978) and the Massachusetts Interscholastic Athletic Council (MIAC) (1950–1978).

== Sports by season ==
| Fall | Winter | Spring |
|---|---|---|
| Cross country | Basketball | Outdoor Track & Field |
| Soccer | Wrestling | Tennis |
| Swimming & Diving (girls) | Ice Hockey | Lacrosse |
| Unified Basketball | Alpine Skiing | Rugby |
| Golf (boys) | Nordic Skiing | Unified Track & Field |
| Volleyball (girls) | Swimming & Diving | Golf (girls) |
| Field Hockey (girls) | Indoor Track & Field | Softball (girls) |
| Football (boys) | Gymnastics (girls) | Volleyball (boys) |
| | | Baseball (boys) |

Rugby became the MIAA's 35th sport in 2016, following a 2015 MIAC vote that passed by a wide majority. Girls wrestling gained MIAA status in 2019.

== Districts and leagues ==
The leagues in the MIAA are separated into nine districts (numbered 1–9).

=== District 1 ===
- Berkshire County League
- Pioneer Valley Interscholastic Athletic Conference

=== District 2 ===
- Central Massachusetts Athletic Conference

=== District 3 ===
- Midland Wachusett League
- Worcester County Athletic Conference

=== District 4 ===
- Dual County League
- Merrimack Valley Conference
- Middlesex League

=== District 5 ===
- Cape Ann League
- Commonwealth Athletic Conference
- Greater Boston League
- Northeastern Conference

=== District 6 ===
- Boston City League
- Catholic Central League
- Catholic Conference
- Massachusetts Charter School Athletic Conference

=== District 7 ===
- Bay State Conference
- Hockomock League
- Tri-Valley League

=== District 8 ===
- Big Three Conference
- Mayflower Athletic Conference
- Pioneer Athletic Conference
- South Coast Conference

=== District 9 ===
- Cape and Islands League
- Patriot League
- South Shore League

== State champions ==
=== Most state championships ===
| Sport | Season | Most Championships |
|---|---|---|
| Baseball | Spring | Somerville, Braintree & St. Mary's Lynn (5) |
| Boys Basketball | Winter | Durfee (9) |
| Girls' Basketball | Winter | St. Mary's Lynn, Cathedral, Archbishop Williams, Lee (7) |
| Field Hockey | Fall | Watertown (22) |
| Football | Fall | Longmeadow (13) |
| Boys' Ice Hockey | Winter | Catholic Memorial (17) |
| Girls' Ice Hockey | Winter | Notre Dame Academy (5) |
| Boys' Lacrosse | Spring | Longmeadow (21) |
| Girls' Lacrosse | Spring | Westwood (10) |
| Girls' Rugby | Spring | Belmont (7) |
| Boys' Soccer | Fall | Bromfield (13) |
| Girls' Soccer | Fall | Sutton (12) |
| Boys' Swimming & Diving | Winter | Weston (27) |
| Girls' Swimming & Diving | Fall/Winter | Acton-Boxborough & Andover (17) |
| Girls' Volleyball | Fall | Barnstable (18) |
| Boys' Volleyball | Spring | New Bedford (8) |
| Boys' Rugby | Spring | Boston College High (5) |
| Softball | Spring | Turners Fall (12) |
| Girls' Gymnastics | Winter | Barnstable (12) |

=== Basketball ===
The state champions for basketball are listed below.

==== Boys' Basketball ====
| Year | MIT Tournament | | | | |
|---|---|---|---|---|---|
| 1926 | Salem | | | | |
| 1927 | Medford | | | | |
| 1928 | Arlington | | | | |
| 1929 | Brockton | | | | |
| 1930 | Chelsea | | | | |
| 1931 | Fitchburg | | | | |
| 1932 | Brockton (2) | | | | |
| 1933 | Fitchburg (2) | | | | |
| 1934 | Chelsea (2) | | | | |
| 1935 | Chelsea (3) | | | | |
| 1936 | Brockton (3) | | | | |
| 1937 | Lowell | | | | |
| 1938 | Chelsea (4) | | | | |
| 1939 | Lynn English | | | | |
| Year | Class A | Class B | Class C | Class D | |
| 1940 | New Bedford | Framingham | | | |
| 1941 | Rindge Tech | Braintree | | | |
| 1942 | Rindge Tech (2) | Newburyport | | | |
| 1943 | Attleboro | Lexington | | | |
| 1944 | Somerville | Braintree (2) | | | |
| 1945 | Somerville (2) | Braintree (3) | | | |
| 1946 | New Bedford (2) | Rockland | Provincetown | | |
| 1947 | Durfee | Boston Latin | Wayland | | |
| 1948 | Durfee (2) | Belmont | Somerset | | |
| 1949 | Somerville (3) | Milton | Punchard | | |
| 1950 | Somerville (4) | Fairhaven | Diman | | |
| 1951 | Quincy | Fairhaven (2) | Chelmsford | | |
| 1952 | Durfee (3) | Winchester | Provincetown (2) | | |
| 1953 | Mission | Weymouth | Marshfield | | |
| 1954 | Brockton (4) | Winchester (2) | Somerset (2) | | |
| 1955 | Somerville (5) | Winchester (3) | Holy Family | Weston | |
| 1956 | Durfee (4) | South Boston | Wareham | Bridgewater | |
| 1957 | Lawrence Central | Natick | Case | Wayland (2) | |
| 1958 | Somerville (6) | Belmont (2) | North Andover | Wayland (3) | |
| 1959 | Everett | Charlestown | Oliver Ames | E. Bridgewater | |
| 1960 | Malden | Walpole | Silver Lake | Bridgewater (2) | |
| 1961 | New Bedford (3) | St. Mary’s (Waltham) | Plymouth | Bridgewater (3) | |
| 1962 | Rindge Tech (3) | Catholic Memorial | Plymouth (2) | Westwood | |
| 1963 | Rindge Tech (4) | Winthrop | Chelmsford (2) | Falmouth | |
| 1964 | Malden (2) | Concord-Carlisle | Plymouth (3) | Provincetown (3) | |
| 1965 | Catholic Memorial (2) | Wakefield | Oliver Ames (2) | Holliston | |
| 1966 | Durfee (5) | Melrose | Chelmsford (3) | Manchester | |
| 1967 | Boston Tech | Melrose (2) | Holy Family (2) | Rockport | |
| 1968 | Boston English | Swampscott | Case (2) | Westford | |
| 1969 | Catholic Memorial (3) | Braintree (4) | Holy Family (3) | Ipswich | |
| 1970 | Catholic Memorial (4) | Hyde Park | Andover | Acton-Boxboro | |
| 1971 | Somerville (7) | Lexington (2) | Barnstable | Acton-Boxboro (2) | |
| Year | Division 1 | Division 2 | Division 3 | Division 4 | Division 5 |
| 1972 | Lexington (3) | Rockland (2) | Holy Family | | |
| 1973 | Holy Name | Rindge Tech (5) | St. Mary’s (Worcester) | | |
| 1974 | Boston English (2) | North Andover (2) | Lenox | | |
| 1975 | Boston English (3) | North Andover (3) | Notre Dame (Fitchburg) | | |
| 1976 | Don Bosco | Commerce | Cathedral | | |
| 1977 | Durfee (6) | Commerce (2) | Notre Dame (Fitchburg) (2) | | |
| 1978 | Lexington (4) | Commerce (3) | Charlestown (2) | | |
| 1979 | Cambridge Rindge & Latin | Hyde Park (2) | Bartlett | | |
| 1980 | Cambridge Rindge & Latin (2) | Lynn Classical | Cathedral (2) | | |
| 1981 | Cambridge Rindge & Latin (3) | Wayland (4) | Dover-Sherborn | | |
| 1982 | No state tournament, (Proposition 2 1/2) | | | | |
| 1983 | No state tournament, (Proposition 2 1/2) | | | | |
| 1984 | Durfee (7) | West Roxbury | Cardinal S | | |
| 1985 | Brockton (5) | East Boston | Cohasset | | |
| 1986 | Cambridge Rindge & Latin (4) | East Boston (2) | Cohasset (2) | | |
| 1987 | Springfield Central (2) | Wahconah | Frontier Regional | | |
| 1988 | Durfee (8) | Milton (2) | St. Joseph | | |
| 1989 | Durfee (9) | Duxbury | Matignon | | |
| 1990 | Cambridge Rindge & Latin (5) | Salem (2) | Smith Academy | | |
| 1991 | Springfield Central (3) | Sharon | Wayland (5) | | |
| 1992 | South Boston (2) | East Boston (3) | Smith Academy (2) | | |
| 1993 | New Bedford (4) | Belmont (3) | Lynn Classical (2) | | |
| 1994 | New Bedford (5) | Duxbury (2) | Lynn Classical (3) | Trinity Catholic | |
| 1995 | South Boston (3) | Salem (3) | Winthrop (2) | Avon | |
| 1996 | South Boston (4) | Milton (3) | Pioneer Valley | Arlington Catholic | |
| 1997 | Taunton | Wakefield (2) | Pioneer Valley (2) | Avon (2) | |
| 1998 | Attleboro (2) | St. Bernard’s | Weston (2) | Avon (3) | |
| 1999 | Central Catholic | East Boston (4) | North Cambridge Catholic | Avon (4) | |
| 2000 | St. John’s | Charlestown (3) | Newburyport (2) | Lynnfield | |
| 2001 | Cambridge Rindge & Latin (6) | Charlestown (4) | St. Joseph (2) | St. Mary’s Lynn | |
| 2002 | Pope Francis | Charlestown (5) | Lynn Tech | St. Mary’s Lynn (2) | |
| 2003 | Amherst-Pelham | Charlestown (6) | Bellingham | Matignon (2) | |
| 2004 | Commerce (4) | Walpole (2) | Rockland (2) | Minuteman Regional | |
| 2005 | Newton North | Charlestown (7) | Whitinsville Christian | Ipswich (2) | |
| 2006 | Newton North (2) | Duxbury High (3) | SABIS | Cathedral (3) | |
| 2007 | Boston College High | Tantasqua Regional | Watertown | Cathedral (4) | |
| 2008 | Central Catholic (2) | Catholic Memorial (5) | Frontier (2) | North Cambridge Catholic (2) | |
| 2009 | St. John's (2) | Milton (4) | Watertown (2) | Cathedral (5) | |
| 2010 | Central Catholic (3) | Sabis (2) | Wareham (2) | New Mission | |
| 2011 | St. John's Prep | New Mission (2) | Whitinsville Christian School (2) | Winthrop (3) | |
| 2012 | Springfield Central (3) | Mahar Regional | Danvers | St. Mary's Lynn (3) | |
| 2013 | Putnam Vo-Tech | Brighton | Danvers (2) | Bishop Connolly | |
| 2014 | Putnam Vo-Tech (2) | New Mission (3) | Cardinal Spellman (2) | St. Clement | |
| 2015 | Catholic Memorial (6) | Danvers (3) | Old Rochester | Hamilton-Wenham | |
| 2016 | Cambridge Rindge & Latin (7) | New Mission (4) | Bishop Stang | St. Mary's Lynn (4) | |
| 2017 | Cambridge Rindge & Latin (8) | Brighton (2) | Hanover | Maynard | |
| 2018 | Mansfield | Tech Boston | Watertown (3) | Pope John XXIII | |
| 2019 | Lynn English (2) | Tech Boston (2) | Dover-Sherborn (2) | Worcester Tech | |
| 2020 | Lynn English (3) & Springfield Central (4) | Whitman Hanson & Taconic | Burke & Sutton | Abington & Hopedale | |
| 2020 | State tournament cut short due to the COVID-19 pandemic leading to Co-champions | | | | |
| 2021 | No state tournament due to the COVID-19 pandemic | | | | |
| 2022 | Boston College High (2) | Malden Catholic | St. Mary's Lynn (5) | Randolph | Maynard (2) |
| 2023 | Worcester North | Malden Catholic (2) | Archbishop Williams | Wareham (3) | Taconic (2) |
| 2024 | Worcester North (2) | Malden Catholic (3) | Charlestown (8) | Wareham (4) | New Mission (5) |
| 2025 | Franklin | Somerset-Berkley (3) | Norwell | Georgetown | Pioneer Valley (3) |
| 2026 | Bishop Feehan | St. Mary’s Lynn (6) | Salem (4) | Wareham (5) | Hoosac Valley |

| Rank | School | Number | Years |
|---|---|---|---|
| 1 | Durfee | 9 | 1947, 1948, 1952, 1956, 1966, 1977, 1984, 1988, 1989 |
| 2 | Cambridge Rindge & Latin | 8 | 1979, 1980, 1981, 1986, 1990, 2001, 2016, 2017 |
| 2 | Charlestown | 8 | 1959, 1978, 2000, 2001, 2002, 2003, 2005, 2024 |
| 4 | Somerville | 7 | 1944, 1945, 1949, 1950, 1955, 1958, 1971 |
| 5 | Catholic Memorial | 6 | 1962, 1965, 1969, 1970, 2008, 2015 |
| 5 | St. Mary’s Lynn | 6 | 2001, 2002, 2012, 2016, 2022, 2026 |

==== Girls' Basketball ====
| Year | Division 1 | | | | |
|---|---|---|---|---|---|
| 1974 | Wayland | | | | |
| 1975 | Hampshire | | | | |
| Year | Division 1 | Division 2 | | | |
| 1976 | Brockton | Hampshire (2) | | | |
| 1977 | Chicopee Comp | Hampshire (3) | | | |
| Year | Division 1 | Division 2 | Division 3 | | |
| 1978 | Chicopee Comp (2) | Drury | Hampshire (4) | | |
| 1979 | Cambridge R&L | Westwood | Martha's Vineyard | | |
| 1980 | Salem | Amherst | Ipswich | | |
| 1981 | Newton North | Abington | Martha's Vineyard (2) | | |
| 1982 | No state tournament, (Proposition 2 1/2) | | | | |
| 1983 | No state tournament, (Proposition 2 1/2) | | | | |
| 1984 | St. Peter-Marian | Walpole | Lenox | | |
| 1985 | Peabody | Westwood (2) | Quaboag | | |
| 1986 | Methuen | Monument Mountain | Quaboag (2) | | |
| 1987 | Haverhill | North Attleboro | Coyle & Cassidy | | |
| 1988 | Chicopee Comp (3) | Wakefield | Cohasset | | |
| 1989 | Haverhill (2) | Walpole (2) | Lee | | |
| 1990 | Bridgewater-Raynham | Milton | Lee (2) | | |
| 1991 | Brockton (2) | North Attleboro (2) | Lee (3) | | |
| 1992 | Haverhill (3) | Oxford | Lenox (2) | | |
| 1993 | Amherst (2) | Oxford (2) | Lee (4) | | |
| Year | Division 1 | Division 2 | Division 3 | Division 4 | |
| 1994 | Haverhill (4) | Walpole (3) | Medway | Hopkinton | |
| 1995 | Haverhill (5) | Walpole (4) | Foxborough | Ipswich (2) | |
| 1996 | Haverhill (6) | Masconomet | Archbishop Williams | Marian | |
| 1997 | Minnechaug | Wakefield (2) | Lee (5) | Hull | |
| 1998 | Minnechaug (2) | Duxbury | Old Rochester | Hopkinton (2) | |
| 1999 | Methuen (2) | David Prouty | Burke | Tyngsborough | |
| 2000 | Minnechaug (3) | Monument Mountain (2) | Rockland | Sacred Heart | |
| 2001 | Brockton (3) | Concord-Carlisle | Westwood (3) | Hopkinton (3) | |
| 2002 | Cambridge R&L (2) | Walpole (5) | Westwood (4) | St. Mary's Lynn | |
| 2003 | Andover | Hampshire (5) | Lee (6) | Harwich | |
| 2004 | Minnechaug (4) | Walpole (6) | Quaboag (3) | Harwich (2) | |
| 2005 | Dartmouth | Hampshire (6) | Case | Ursuline Academy | |
| 2006 | Braintree | Oliver Ames | Quaboag (4) | Marian (2) | |
| 2007 | Springfield Central | Lincoln-Sudbury | Archbishop Williams (2) | New Mission | |
| 2008 | Northampton | Wellesley | Archbishop Williams (3) | Cohasset (2) | |
| 2009 | Central Catholic | Notre Dame (Hingham) | Swampscott | Millis | |
| 2010 | Andover (2) | Oliver Ames (2) | Lee (7) | Cohasset (3) | |
| 2011 | Andover (3) | Arlington Catholic | St. Mary's Lynn (2) | Hull (2) | |
| 2012 | Andover (4) | Reading Memorial | Pentucket | Fenway | |
| 2013 | Central Catholic (2) | Medfield | Archbishop Williams (4) | Fenway (2) | |
| 2014 | Braintree (2) | Arlington Catholic (2) | St. Mary's Lynn (3) | Millis (2) | |
| 2015 | Braintree (3) | Duxbury (2) | Archbishop Williams (5) | Millis (3) | |
| 2016 | Bishop Feehan | Longmeadow | Bishop Fenwick | Cathedral | |
| 2017 | Springfield Central (2) | Medfield (2) | Archbishop Williams (6) | Cathedral (2) | |
| 2018 | Braintree (4) | Foxborough (2) | Archbishop Williams (7) | Coyle & Cassidy (2) | |
| 2019 | Braintree (5) | Pentucket (2) | Hoosac Valley | Cathedral (3) | |
| 2020 | Andover (5) & Franklin | Foxborough (3) & Taconic | St. Mary's Lynn (4) & Hoosac Valley (2) | Cathedral (4) & Maynard | |
| 2021 | No state tournament due to the COVID-19 pandemic | | | | |
| Year | Division 1 | Division 2 | Division 3 | Division 4 | Division 5 |
| 2022 | Springfield Central (3) | Oliver Ames (3) | St. Mary's Lynn (5) | Amesbury | Hopedale |
| 2023 | Andover (6) | Foxborough (4) | St. Mary's Lynn (6) | Cathedral (5) | Springfield International |
| 2024 | Bishop Feehan (2) | Medfield (3) | Foxborough (5) | Cathedral (6) | Hoosac Valley (3) |
| 2025 | Wachusett | Medfield (4) | St. Mary's Lynn (7) | Cathedral (7) | Hoosac Valley (4) |
| 2026 | Wachusett (2) | Medfield (5) | Bishop Fenwick (2) | South Hadley | Hopedale (2) |

| Rank | School | Number | Years |
|---|---|---|---|
| 1 | Lee | 7 | 1989, 1990, 1991, 1993, 1997, 2003, 2010 |
| 1 | Archbishop Williams | 7 | 1996, 2007, 2008, 2013, 2015, 2017, 2018 |
| 1 | St. Mary's Lynn | 7 | 2002, 2011, 2014, 2020, 2022, 2023. 2025 |
| 1 | Cathedral | 7 | 2016, 2017, 2019, 2020, 2023, 2024, 2025 |
| 5 | Haverhill | 6 | 1987, 1989, 1992, 1994, 1995, 1996 |
| 5 | Walpole | 6 | 1984, 1989, 1994, 1995, 2002, 2004 |
| 5 | Hampshire | 6 | 1975, 1976, 1977, 1978, 2003, 2005 |
| 5 | Andover | 6 | 2003, 2010, 2011, 2012, 2020, 2023 |

=== Cross Country ===
The state champions for cross country are listed below.

==== Boys' Cross Country ====
| Year | Division 1 | Division 2 | Division 3 |
|---|---|---|---|
| 1967 | Brockton | | |
| 1968 | Boston College High | | |
| 1969 | Foxborough | | |
| 1970 | Brockton (2) | | |
| 1971 | Pope Francis Preparatory | | |
| 1972 | Wakefield | | |
| 1973 | Pope Francis Preparatory (2) | | |
| 1974 | Dennis-Yarmouth | | |
| 1975 | Dennis-Yarmouth (2) | | |
| 1976 | Gardner | | |
| 1977 | Salem | | |
| 1978 | Newton North | | |
| 1979 | Narragansett | | |
| 1980 | Pope Francis Preparatory (3) | | |
| 1981 | Newton North (2) | | |
| 1982 | Catholic Memorial | | |
| 1983 | Narragansett (2) | | |
| 1984 | Xaverian | | |
| 1985 | Falmouth | | |
| 1986 | Cambridge | | |
| 1987 | Bishop Feehan | | |
| 1988 | Chelmsford | | |
| 1989 | Dennis-Yarmouth (3) | | |
| 1990 | Dennis-Yarmouth (4) | Weston | |
| 1991 | Cambridge (2) | Walpole | |
| 1992 | St. John's | Walpole (2) | |
| 1993 | Plymouth | Bishop Feehan (2) | |
| 1994 | Gloucester | Bishop Feehan (3) | |
| 1995 | Gloucester (2) | Narragansett (3) | |
| 1996 | Gloucester (3) | Narragansett (4) | |
| 1997 | Gloucester (4) | Oliver Ames | |
| 1998 | Gloucester (5) | Oliver Ames (2) | |
| 1999 | Gloucester (6) | Mohawk Trail | |
| 2000 | St. John's Preparatory | Mohawk Trail (2) | |
| 2001 | Amherst | East Bridgewater | |
| 2002 | Wachusett | East Bridgewater (2) | |
| 2003 | St. John's Preparatory (2) | Bishop Feehan (4) | |
| 2004 | Newton North (3) | Mansfield | |
| 2005 | Brockton (3) | Hopedale | |
| 2006 | Brockton (4) | Swampscott | |
| 2007 | Brookline | Hopedale (2) | |
| 2008 | Mansfield (2) | Bishop Feehan (5) | |
| 2009 | Mansfield (3) | Pembroke | |
| 2010 | Brookline (2) | Pembroke (2) | |
| 2011 | Brookline (3) | Bishop Feehan (6) | |
| 2012 | Lowell | Pembroke (3) | |
| 2013 | Mansfield (3) | Pembroke (4) | |
| 2014 | Lowell (2) | Hopedale (3) | |
| 2015 | Lowell (3) | Marblehead | |
| 2016 | Wellesley | Hopedale (4) | |
| 2017 | St John's (2) | Parker Charter | |
| 2018 | Concord-Carlisle | Newburyport | |
| 2019 | St. John's Preparatory (3) | Martha's Vineyard | |
| 2020 | No state tournament due to COVID-19 pandemic | | |
| 2021 | St. John's Preparatory (4) | Wakefield (2) | Parker Charter (2) |
| 2022 | Brookline (4) | Wakefield (3) | Lenox |
| 2023 | Brookline (5) | Danvers | Parker Charter (3) |
| 2024 | Brookline (6) | Longmeadow | Parker Charter (4) |
| 2025 | Brookline (7) | Boston Latin | Parker Charter (5) |

===== Most State Championships =====
| Rank | School | Number | Years |
|---|---|---|---|
| 1 | Brookline | 7 | 2007, 2010, 2011, 2022, 2023, 2024, 2025 |
| 2 | Bishop Feehan | 6 | 1987, 1993, 1994, 2003, 2008, 2011 |
| 3 | Gloucester | 6 | 1994, 1995, 1996, 1997, 1998, 1999 |
| 4 | Parker Charter | 5 | 2017, 2021, 2023, 2024, 2025 |

==== Girls' Cross Country ====
| Year | Division 1 | Division 2 | Division 3 |
|---|---|---|---|
| 1972 | Falmouth | | |
| 1973 | Falmouth (2) | | |
| 1974 | Falmouth (3) | | |
| 1975 | Falmouth (4) | | |
| 1976 | Mohawk Trail | | |
| 1977 | Falmouth (5) | | |
| 1978 | Peabody | | |
| 1979 | Weymouth | | |
| 1980 | Bishop Fenwick | | |
| 1981 | Sharon | | |
| 1982 | North Quincy | | |
| 1983 | Notre Dame | | |
| 1984 | Notre Dame (2) | | |
| 1985 | Notre Dame (3) | | |
| 1986 | Notre Dame (4) | | |
| 1987 | Pittsfield | | |
| 1988 | Mohawk Trail (2) | | |
| 1989 | Fitchburg | | |
| 1990 | Durfee | Mount Greylock | |
| 1991 | Amherst | Mohawk Trail (3) | |
| 1992 | Nashoba | Mount Greylock (2) | |
| 1993 | Newton South | Mount Greylock (3) | |
| 1994 | Newton North | Mount Greylock (4) | |
| 1995 | Newton North (2) | Newburyport | |
| 1996 | Newton North (3) | Milton | |
| 1997 | Brookline | Newburyport (2) | |
| 1998 | Amherst (2) | Milton (2) | |
| 1999 | Barnstable | Hamilton-Wenham | |
| 2000 | Amherst (3) | Hamilton-Wenham (2) | |
| 2001 | Lexington | Newburyport (3) | |
| 2002 | Amherst (4) | Bromfield | |
| 2003 | Amherst (5) | Bishop Feehan | |
| 2004 | Amherst (6) | Wellesley | |
| 2005 | Amherst (7) | Bromfield (2) | |
| 2006 | Dennis-Yarmouth | Bromfield (3) | |
| 2007 | Lincoln-Sudbury | Bromfield (4) | |
| 2008 | Newton South (2) | Hamilton-Wenham (3) | |
| 2009 | Lincoln-Sudbury (2) | Bishop Feehan (2) | |
| 2010 | Weymouth (2) | Bishop Feehan (3) | |
| 2011 | Whitman-Hanson | Bishop Feehan (4) | |
| 2012 | Peabody (2) | Bishop Feehan (5) | |
| 2013 | Needham | Hamilton-Wenham (4) | |
| 2014 | Needham (2) | Hamilton-Wenham (5) | |
| 2015 | Needham (3) | Milton (3) | |
| 2016 | Lexington (2) | Milton (4) | |
| 2017 | Concord-Carlisle | Mount Greylock (5) | |
| 2018 | Natick | Littleton | |
| 2019 | Concord-Carlisle (2) | Lenox | |
| 2020 | No state tournament due to COVID-19 pandemic | | |
| 2021 | Marshfield | Holliston | Mount Greylock (6) |
| 2022 | Brookline (2) | Holliston (2) | Weston |
| 2023 | Oliver Ames | Wakefield | Bromfield (5) |
| 2024 | Westford Academy | Westwood | Hamilton-Wenham (6) |
| 2025 | Lexington (3) | Boston Latin | Greater Lowell Tech |

===== Most State Championships =====
| Rank | School | Number | Years |
|---|---|---|---|
| 1 | Amherst | 7 | 1991, 1998, 2000, 2002, 2003, 2004, 2005 |
| 2 | Hamilton-Wenham | 6 | 1999, 2000, 2008, 2013, 2014, 2024 |
| 3 | Mount Greylock | 6 | 1990, 1992, 1993, 1994, 2017, 2021 |
| 4 | Bromfield | 5 | 2002, 2005, 2006, 2007, 2023 |
| 5 | Bishop Feehan | 5 | 2003, 2009, 2010, 2011, 2012 |
| 6 | Falmouth | 5 | 1972, 1973, 1974, 1975, 1977 |

=== Ice Hockey ===
The state champions for ice hockey are listed below.

==== Boys' Ice Hockey ====
| Year | Division 1A (Super 8) | Division 1 | Division 2 | Division 3 | Division 3A | Division 4 |
|---|---|---|---|---|---|---|
| 1943 | | Medford | | | | |
| 1944 | | Needham & Medford (2) | | | | |
| 1945 | | Walpole | | | | |
| 1946 | | Needham (2) | | | | |
| 1947 | | Arlington | | | | |
| 1948 | | Malden Catholic | | | | |
| 1949 | | Arlington (2) | | | | |
| 1950 | | Melrose | | | | |
| 1951 | | Natick | | | | |
| 1952 | | West Springfield | | | | |
| 1953 | | Walpole (2) | | | | |
| 1954 | | Needham (3) | | | | |
| 1955 | | Winchester | | | | |
| 1956 | | Lynn English | | | | |
| 1957 | | Lynn English (2) | | | | |
| 1958 | | Cambridge Latin | | | | |
| 1959 | | Arlington (3) | | | | |
| 1960 | | Malden Catholic (2) | | | | |
| 1961 | | Framingham | | | | |
| 1962 | | Melrose (2) | | | | |
| 1963 | | Walpole (3) | | | | |
| 1964 | | Arlington (4) | | | | |
| 1965 | | Walpole (4) | | | | |
| 1966 | | Needham (4) | | | | |
| 1967 | | Arlington (5) | | | | |
| 1968 | | Auburn | | | | |
| 1969 | | Needham (5) | | | | |
| 1970 | | Needham (6) | | | | |
| 1971 | | Arlington (6) | | | | |
| 1972 | | Norwood | Barnstable | | | |
| 1973 | | Auburn (2) | St. Joseph's | | | |
| 1974 | | Malden Catholic (3) | Acton-Boxborough | | | |
| 1975 | | Matignon | Billerica | | | |
| 1976 | | Winthrop | Billerica (2) | | | |
| 1977 | | Matignon (2) | Billerica (3) | | | |
| 1978 | | Hudson | Arlington Catholic | | | |
| 1979 | | St. John's Prep | Falmouth | | | |
| 1980 | | Matignon (3) | Barnstable (2) | | | |
| 1981 | | Matignon (4) | Falmouth (2) | | | |
| 1982 | | Matignon (5) | Falmouth (3) | | | |
| 1983 | | Matignon (6) | Franklin | | | |
| 1984 | | Matignon (7) | Christopher Columbus | Shawsheen | | |
| 1985 | | St. John's Prep (2) | Scituate | Westwood | | |
| 1986 | | Catholic Memorial | Austin Prep | Minuteman Regional | | |
| 1987 | | Catholic Memorial (2) | Matignon (8) | Northeast Metro | | |
| 1988 | | Catholic Memorial (3) | Matignon (9) | Northeast Metro (2) | | |
| 1989 | | Don Bosco | Ausin Prep (2) | Northeast Metro (3) | | |
| 1990 | | Catholic Memorial (4) | Arlington Catholic (2) | Pittsfield | | |
| 1991 | Catholic Memorial (5) | Barnstable (3) | Archbishop Williams | Westwood (2) | | |
| 1992 | Catholic Memorial (6) | Framingham (2) | Hingham | Westwood (3) | | |
| 1993 | Catholic Memorial (7) | Matignon (10) | Gloucester | Bishop Connolly | | |
| 1994 | Catholic Memorial (8) | Boston College High | Danvers | Gardner | | |
| 1995 | Catholic Memorial (9) | Chelmsford | Tewksbury | North Middlesex | | |
| 1996 | Boston College High (2) | Falmouth (4) | Springfield Cathedral | Lynnfield | | |
| 1997 | Arlington Catholic (3) | Archbishop Williams (2) | Hingham (2) | Hanover | | |
| 1998 | Catholic Memorial (10) | Winchester (2) | Gloucester (2) | North Middlesex (2) | | |
| 1999 | Catholic Memorial (11) | St. John's | Saugus | Shrewsbury | | |
| 2000 | Catholic Memorial (12) | Winchester (3) | Duxbury | Martha's Vineyard Regional | | |
| 2001 | Catholic Memorial (13) | Hingham (3) | Danvers (2) | Hanover (2) | | |
| 2002 | Boston College High (3) | Waltham | Martha's Vineyard Regional (2) | Westwood (4) | | |
| 2003 | Catholic Memorial (14) | Springfield Cathedral (2) | Saugus (2) | Westfield | | |
| 2004 | Catholic Memorial (15) | St. John's (2) | Saugus (3) | Bourne | | |
| 2005 | Catholic Memorial (16) | Duxbury (2) | Boston Latin | Marlborough | | |
| 2006 | Boston College High (4) | Marshfield | Gloucester (3) | Longmeadow | | |
| 2007 | Boston College High (5) | Duxbury (3) | Hanover (3) | Scituate (2) | | |
| 2008 | Reading | Needham (7) | Sandwich | Westfield (2) | Greenfield | |
| 2009 | Catholic Memorial (17) | Springfield Cathedral (3) | Newburyport | Shrewsbury (2) | Holyoke | |
| 2010 | Hingham (4) | Arlington Catholic (4) | Canton | Longmeadow (2) | Oakmont/Narragansett | |
| 2011 | Malden Catholic (4) | Marshfield (2) | Tewksbury (2) | Marblehead | Holyoke (2) | |
| 2012 | Malden Catholic (5) | Burlington | Wilmington | Hudson (2) | Groton-Dunstable | |
| 2013 | Malden Catholic (6) | Burlington (2) | Wilmington (2) | Westfield (3) | Agawam | |
| 2014 | Malden Catholic (7) | Reading (2) | Beverly | Shrewsbury (3) | North Middlesex (3) | |
| 2015 | St. John's Prep (3) | Hingham (5) | Westwood (5) | Watertown | Nashoba Regional | |
| 2016 | Malden Catholic (8) | Franklin (2) | Medfield | Hanover (4) | Nashoba Regional (2) | |
| 2017 | Arlington (7) | St. Mary's Lynn | Lowell Catholic | Shrewsbury (4) | Grafton | |
| 2018 | Boston College High (6) | Waltham (2) | Plymouth South | Shrewsbury (5) | Lunenburg / Ayer Shirley | |
| 2019 | Boston College High (7) | Duxbury (4) | Canton (2) | Wachusett Regional | Northbridge | |
| 2020 (Note: The 2020 tournaments (minus Division 3A) were all cancelled before the final round due to the COVID-19 pandemic. The surviving teams all split their respective championships.) | Arlington (8) & Pope Francis (4) | Belmont & Walpole (5) | Canton (3) & Lincoln-Sudbury | Hanover (5) & Longmeadow (3) | Greenfield (2) | |
| 2021 | No state tournaments due to the COVID-19 pandemic | | | | | |
| 2022 | | St. John's Prep (4) | Tewksbury (3) | Hanover (6) | | Sandwich (2) |
| 2023 | | Pope Francis (5) | Canton (4) | Nashoba Regional (3) | | Norwell |
| 2024 | | St. John's Prep (5) | Boston Latin (2) | Marblehead (2) | | Dover-Sherborn / Weston |
| 2025 | | Catholic Memorial (18) | Billerica (4) | Nauset Regional | | Winthrop (2) |
| 2026 | | Pope Francis (6) | Canton (5) | Hanover (7) | | Littleton / Bromfield |

===== Most State Championships =====
| Rank | School | Number | Years |
|---|---|---|---|
| 1 | Catholic Memorial | 18 | 1986, 1987, 1988, 1990, 1991, 1992, 1993, 1994, 1995, 1998, 1999, 2000, 2001, 2003, 2004, 2005, 2009, 2025 |
| 2 | Matignon | 10 | 1975, 1977, 1980, 1981, 1982, 1983, 1984, 1987, 1988, 1993 |
| 3 | Malden Catholic | 8 | 1948, 1960, 1974, 2011, 2012, 2013, 2014, 2016 |
| 3 | Arlington | 8 | 1947, 1949, 1959, 1964, 1967, 1971, 2017, 2020 |
| 5 | Boston College High | 7 | 1994, 1996, 2002, 2006, 2007, 2018, 2019 |
| 5 | Hanover | 7 | 1997, 2001, 2007, 2016, 2020, 2022, 2026 |

=== Swimming & Diving ===
==== Boys' Swimming & Diving ====
Boys' Swimming & Diving has been an MIAA sport since 1947, competing in the winter season. Division 2 was added in 1987. The MIAA Boys' Swimming & Diving State Champions are listed below.

| Year | Division 1 | Division 2 |
|---|---|---|
| 1947 | Gardner | |
| 1948 | Gardner (2) | |
| 1949 | Gardner (3) | |
| 1950 | Springfield Tech | |
| 1951 | Springfield Tech (2) | |
| 1952 | Gardner (4) | |
| 1953 | Gardner (5) | |
| 1954 | Gardner (6) | |
| 1955 | Gardner (7) | |
| 1956 | Gardner (8) | |
| 1957 | Gardner (9) | |
| 1958 | Gardner (10) | |
| 1959 | Gardner (11) | |
| 1960 | Gardner (12) | |
| 1961 | Gardner (13) | |
| 1962 | Holyoke | |
| 1963 | Minnechaug | |
| 1964 | Boston English | |
| 1965 | Holyoke (2) | |
| 1966 | Gardner (14) | |
| 1967 | Chicopee | |
| 1968 | Holyoke (3) | |
| 1969 | Holyoke (4) | |
| 1970 | Minnechaug (2) | |
| 1971 | Seekonk | |
| 1972 | Seekonk (2) | |
| 1973 | Seekonk (3) | |
| 1974 | Longmeadow | |
| 1975 | Springfield Cathedral | |
| 1976 | East Longmeadow | |
| 1977 | Springfield Cathedral (2) | |
| 1978 | Haverhill | |
| 1979 | Longmeadow (2) | |
| 1980 | Gardner (15) | |
| 1981 | Springfield Cathedral (3) | |
| 1982 | No State Championship due to Prop. 2 1/2 | |
| 1983 | Weston | |
| 1984 | Longmeadow (3) and Westfield | |
| 1985 | Brookline | |
| 1986 | Minnechaug (3) | |
| 1987 | Lincoln-Sudbury | Weston (2) |
| 1988 | Acton-Boxborough | Weston (3) |
| 1989 | Acton-Boxborough (2) | Weston (4) |
| 1990 | Acton-Boxborough (3) | Weston (5) |
| 1991 | Acton-Boxborough (4) | - |
| 1992 | Acton-Boxborough (5) | - |
| 1993 | Acton-Boxborough (6) | Weston (6) |
| 1994 | Acton-Boxborough (7) | Weston (7) |
| 1995 | Acton-Boxborough (8) | Weston (8) |
| 1996 | Xaverian Brothers | Seekonk (4) |
| 1997 | Boston College High | Weston (9) |
| 1998 | Boston College High (2) | Lincoln-Sudbury (2) |
| 1999 | Boston College High (3) | Weston (10) |
| 2000 | Acton-Boxborough (9) | Weston (11) |
| 2001 | St. John's Prep | Weston (12) |
| 2002 | Chelmsford | Weston (13) |
| 2003 | Chelmsford (2) | Weston (14) |
| 2004 | Chelmsford (3) | Weston (15) |
| 2005 | Boston College High (4) | Weston (16) |
| 2006 | St. John's Prep (2) | Weston (17) |
| 2007 | St. John's Prep (3) | Weston (18) |
| 2008 | St. John's Prep (4) | Weston (19) |
| 2009 | St. John's Prep (5) | Wayland |
| 2010 | St. John's Prep (6) | Wayland (2) |
| 2011 | St. John's Prep (7) | King Philip |
| 2012 | St. John's Prep (8) | Weston (20) |
| 2013 | St. John's Prep (9) | Weston (21) |
| 2014 | St. John's Prep (10) | Weston (22) |
| 2015 | Westford Academy | Weston (23) |
| 2016 | St. John's Prep (11) | Weston (24) |
| 2017 | St. John's Prep (12) | Wayland (3) |
| 2018 | St. John's Prep (13) | Wayland (4) |
| 2019 | St. John's Prep (14) | Wayland (5) |
| 2020 | St. John's Prep (15) | Wayland (6) |
| 2021 | No State Championships due to COVID-19 pandemic | |
| 2022 | St. John's Prep (16) | Weston (25) |
| 2023 | Westford Academy (2) | Weston (26) |
| 2024 | St. John's Prep (17) | Weston (27) |
| 2025 | St. John's Prep (18) | Wayland (7) |
| 2026 | St. John's Prep (19) | Wayland (8) |

===== Most State Championships =====
| Rank | School | Number | Years |
|---|---|---|---|
| 1 | Weston | 27 | 1983, 1987, 1988, 1989, 1990, 1993, 1994, 1995, 1997, 1999, 2000, 2001, 2002, 2003, 2004, 2005, 2006, 2007, 2008, 2012, 2013, 2014, 2015, 2016, 2022, 2023, 2024 |
| 2 | St. John's Prep | 19 | 2001, 2006, 2007, 2008, 2009, 2010, 2011, 2012, 2013, 2014, 2016, 2017, 2018, 2019, 2020, 2022, 2024, 2025, 2026 |
| 3 | Gardner | 15 | 1947, 1948, 1949, 1952, 1953, 1954, 1955, 1956, 1957, 1958, 1959, 1960, 1961, 1966, 1980 |
| 4 | Acton-Boxborough | 9 | 1988, 1989, 1990, 1991, 1992, 1993, 1994, 1995, 2000 |
| 5 | Wayland | 8 | 2009, 2010, 2017, 2018, 2019, 2020, 2025, 2026 |

==== Girls' Swimming & Diving ====
Girls' Swimming & Diving has been an MIAA sport since 1971, beginning solely as a fall season sport. Girls' swimming & diving then expanded to become both a fall and winter season sport beginning in 1991. Division 2 was added in 2004 for the fall season and 2006 for the winter season. Division 2 was subsequently removed in 2026 for the fall season. The MIAA Girls' Swimming & Diving State Champions are listed below.

| Year | Division 1 Fall | Division 2 Fall | Division 1 Winter | Division 2 Winter |
|---|---|---|---|---|
| 1971 | Wellesley | | | |
| 1972 | Wellesley (2) | | | |
| 1973 | Wayland | | | |
| 1974 | Bedford | | | |
| 1975 | Bedford (2) | | | |
| 1976 | Minnechaug | | | |
| 1977 | East Longmeadow | | | |
| 1978 | Durfee | | | |
| 1979 | Northampton | | | |
| 1980 | Northampton (2) | | | |
| 1981 | No State Championship due to Prop. 2 1/2 | | | |
| 1982 | Acton-Boxborough | | | |
| 1983 | Acton-Boxborough (2) | | | |
| 1984 | Acton-Boxborough (3) | | | |
| 1985 | Acton-Boxborough (4) | | | |
| 1986 | Acton-Boxborough (5) | | | |
| 1987 | Acton-Boxborough (6) | | | |
| 1988 | Wellesley (3) | | | |
| 1989 | Wellesley (4) | | | |
| 1990 | Wellesley (5) | | | |
| 1991 | Acton-Boxborough (7) | | Lynn English | |
| 1992 | Acton-Boxborough (8) | | Minnechaug (2) | |
| 1993 | Acton-Boxborough (9) | | St. Joseph | |
| 1994 | Acton-Boxborough (10) | | Gardner | |
| 1995 | Acton-Boxborough (11) | | Gardner (2) | |
| 1996 | Acton-Boxborough (12) | | Gardner (3) | |
| 1997 | Acton-Boxborough (13) | | Gardner (4) | |
| 1998 | Acton-Boxborough (14) | | Gardner (5) | |
| 1999 | Andover | | Gardner (6) | |
| 2000 | Andover* [Vacated] | | Gardner (7) | |
| 2001 | Andover (2) | | Gardner (8) | |
| 2002 | Andover (3) | | Gardner (9) | |
| 2003 | Andover* [Vacated] | | Gardner (10) | |
| 2004 | Andover (4) | Central Catholic | Gardner (11) | |
| 2005 | Andover (5) | Notre Dame Academy | Gardner (12) | |
| 2006 | Andover (6) | Notre Dame Academy (2) | Gardner (13) | Wayland (2) |
| 2007 | Andover (7) | Notre Dame Academy (3) | Gardner (14) | Wayland (3) |
| 2008 | Chelmsford | Notre Dame Academy (4) | Gardner (15) | Wayland (4) |
| 2009 | Andover (8) | Bishop Feehan | Lincoln-Sudbury | Wayland (5) |
| 2010 | Andover (9) | Reading | Gardner (16) | Wayland (6) |
| 2011 | Andover (10) | Reading (2) | Lincoln-Sudbury (2) | Marblehead |
| 2012 | Andover (11) | Bishop Feehan (2) | Westford Academy | Wayland (7) |
| 2013 | Chelmsford (2) | Bishop Feehan (3) | Westford Academy (2) | Wayland (8) |
| 2014 | Andover (12) | Bishop Feehan (4) | Westford Academy (3) | Wayland (9) |
| 2015 | Andover (13) | Bishop Feehan (5) | Lincoln-Sudbury (3) | Weston |
| 2016 | Andover (14) | Reading (3) | Westford Academy (4) | Marblehead (2) |
| 2017 | Andover (15) | Reading (4) | Westford Academy (5) | Duxbury |
| 2018 | Andover (16) | Reading (5) | Westford Academy (6) | Duxbury (2) |
| 2019 | Andover (17) | Wellesley (6) | Westford Academy (7) | Wayland (10) |
| 2020 | No State Championships due to COVID-19 pandemic | | Westford Academy (8) | Duxbury (3) |
| 2021 | Acton-Boxborough (15) | Wellesley (7) | No State Championships due to COVID-19 pandemic | |
| 2022 | Acton-Boxborough (16) | Wellesley (8) | Westford Academy (9) | Amherst |
| 2023 | Needham | Wellesley (9) | Lincoln-Sudbury (4) | Marblehead (3) |
| 2024 | Acton-Boxborough (17) | Wellesley (10) | Concord-Carlisle | Weston (2) |
| 2025 | Newton North | Wellesley (11) | Concord-Carlisle (2) | Weston (3) |
| 2026 | Framingham | | Concord-Carlisle (3) | Weston (4) |

===== Most State Championships =====
| Rank | School | Number | Years |
|---|---|---|---|
| 1 | Acton-Boxborough | 17 | 1982, 1983, 1984, 1985, 1986, 1987, 1991, 1992, 1993, 1994, 1995, 1996, 1997, 1998, 2021, 2022, 2024 |
| 1 | Andover | 17 | 1999, 2001, 2002, 2004, 2005, 2006, 2007, 2009, 2010, 2011, 2012, 2014, 2015, 2016, 2017, 2018, 2019 |
| 3 | Gardner | 16 | 1994, 1995, 1996, 1997, 1998, 1999, 2000, 2001, 2002, 2003, 2004, 2005, 2006, 2007, 2008, 2010 |
| 4 | Wellesley | 11 | 1971, 1972, 1988, 1989, 1990, 2019, 2021, 2022, 2023, 2024, 2025 |
| 5 | Wayland | 10 | 1973, 2006, 2007, 2008, 2009, 2010, 2012, 2013, 2014, 2019 |

=== Boys' Soccer ===
The state champions for boys' soccer are listed below.

| Year | Division 1 | Division 2 | Division 3 | Division 4 | Division 5 |
|---|---|---|---|---|---|
| 1968 | Needham | | | | |
| 1969 | Chicopee | | | | |
| 1970 | Chicopee (2) | | | | |
| 1971 | New Bedford | | | | |
| 1972 | Pope Francis Preparatory | | | | |
| 1973 | Chicopee (3) | Quabbin | | | |
| 1974 | West Springfield | Monument Mountain | | | |
| 1975 | West Springfield (2) | Hampshire | | | |
| 1976 | Ludlow | Duxbury | | | |
| 1977 | West Springfield (3) | Southwick | | | |
| 1978 | Leominster | Duxbury (2) | | | |
| 1979 | Ludlow (2) | Nauset | | | |
| 1980 | Wellesley | Duxbury (3) | | | |
| 1981 | No state final due to Proposition 2 1/2 | | | | |
| 1982 | No state final due to Proposition 2 1/2 | | | | |
| 1983 | Chicopee (4) | Duxbury (4) | | | |
| 1984 | Wachusett | Duxbury (5) | | | |
| 1985 | St. John's | Rockland | | | |
| 1986 | Plymouth North / Carver | Winchester | Bromfield | | |
| 1987 | Pope Francis Preparatory (2) | Winchester (2) | Bromfield (2) | | |
| 1988 | Silver Lake | Duxbury (6) | Bromfield (3) | | |
| 1989 | Wakefield | Framingham | Bromfield (4) | | |
| 1990 | Pope Francis Preparatory (3) | Nashoba | Medway | | |
| 1991 | Weymouth | Wellesley (2) | Monson | | |
| 1992 | Framingham (2) | Westford Academy | Dover-Sherborn | | |
| 1993 | Pope Francis Preparatory (4) | Shepherd Hill | Medway (2) | | |
| 1994 | St. John's Preparatory | Duxbury (7) | Nipmuc | | |
| 1995 | Ludlow (3) | Needham (2) | Mount Greylock | | |
| 1996 | Weymouth (2) | Masconomet | Bromfield (5) | | |
| 1997 | Ludlow (4) | Wakefield (2) | Gateway | | |
| 1998 | Marshfield | David Prouty | Medway (3) | | |
| 1999 | Ludlow (5) | Duxbury (8) | Groton-Dunstable | | |
| 2000 | Ludlow (6) | Woburn | Medway (4) | | |
| 2001 | St. John's (2) | Groton-Dunstable (2) | Wayland | | |
| 2002 | St. John's (3) | Lincoln-Sudbury | Sutton | | |
| 2003 | Ludlow (7) | Westborough | Grafton | | |
| 2004 | Algonquin / Boston College High | Somerset Berkley | Stoneham | | |
| 2005 | Algonquin | Stoneham (2) | Bromfield (6) | | |
| 2006 | St. John's Preparatory (2) | Concord-Carlisle | Bartlett | | |
| 2007 | St. John's (4) | Hampshire (2) | Bromfield (7) | | |
| 2008 | Ludlow (8) | Mount Greylock (2) | Bromfield (8) | | |
| 2009 | Catholic Memorial | Concord-Carlisle (2) | Weston | | |
| 2010 | Ludlow (9) | Concord-Carlisle (3) | Dover-Sherborn (2) | | |
| 2011 | Ludlow (10) | Groton-Dunstable (3) | Sutton (2) | | |
| 2012 | Needham (3) | Groton-Dunstable (4) | Sutton (3) | | |
| 2013 | West Springfield (4) | Masconomet (2) | Belchertown | Sutton (4) | |
| 2014 | Needham (4) | Concord-Carlisle (4) | Wayland (2) | Sutton (5) | |
| 2015 | Lincoln-Sudbury (2) | Oliver Ames | Norton | Monson (2) | |
| 2016 | Lexington | Nauset (2) | Wayland (3) | Monson (3) | |
| 2017 | Brockton | Concord-Carlisle (5) | Nipmuc (2) | Bromfield (9) | |
| 2018 | Ludlow (11) | Nauset (3) | Wayland (4) | Bromfield (10) | |
| 2019 | Longmeadow | Winchester (3) | Belchertown (2) | Bromfield (11) | |
| 2020 | No state final due to COVID-19 pandemic | | | | |
| 2021 | Brookline | West Springfield (5) | Norwell | Easthampton | Bromfield (12) |
| 2022 | St. John's Preparatory (3) | Oliver Ames (2) | Newburyport | South Hadley | Bromfield (13) |
| 2023 | Concord-Carlisle (6) | Oliver Ames (3) | Norwell (2) | Lynnfield | Westport |
| 2024 | Newton North | Oliver Ames (4) | Dover-Sherborn (3) | Cohasset | Sutton (6) |
| 2025 | Natick | West Springfield (6) | Norwell (3) | Bromfield (14) | Boston International |

==== Most State Championships ====
| Rank | School | Number | Years |
|---|---|---|---|
| 1 | Bromfield | 14 | 1986, 1987, 1988, 1989, 1996, 2005, 2007, 2008, 2017, 2018, 2019, 2021, 2022, 2025 |
| 2 | Ludlow | 11 | 1976, 1979, 1995, 1997, 1999, 2000, 2003, 2008, 2010, 2011, 2018 |
| 3 | Duxbury | 8 | 1976, 1978, 1980, 1983, 1984, 1988, 1994, 1999 |
| 4 | Sutton | 6 | 2002, 2011, 2012, 2013, 2014, 2024 |
| 5 | Concord-Carlisle | 6 | 2006, 2009, 2010, 2014, 2017, 2023 |
| 6 | West Springfield | 6 | 1974, 1975, 1977, 2013, 2021, 2025 |

=== Girls' Soccer ===
The state champions for girls' soccer are listed below.

| Year | Division 1 | Division 2 | Division 3 | Division 4 | Division 5 |
|---|---|---|---|---|---|
| 1979 | Concord-Carlisle | | | | |
| 1980 | Concord-Carlisle (2) | | | | |
| 1981 | No State Final - Proposition 2 1/2 | | | | |
| 1982 | No State Final - Proposition 2 1/2 | | | | |
| 1983 | Winchester | Duxbury | | | |
| 1984 | Needham | Belmont | | | |
| 1985 | Marlborough | Marian | | | |
| 1986 | Winchester (2) | Wahconah | | | |
| 1987 | Andover / Agawam | Foxborough | | | |
| 1988 | Marlborough (2) | Rockland | | | |
| 1989 | Newton North | Masconomet | | | |
| 1990 | Winchester (3) | Concord-Carlisle (3) | | | |
| 1991 | Marlborough (3) | Sutton | | | |
| 1992 | Newton North (2) | Sutton (2) | | | |
| 1993 | Pope Francis Preparatory | Sutton (3) | | | |
| 1994 | Marshfield | Duxbury (2) | Sacred Heart | | |
| 1995 | Winchester (4) | Sutton (4) | Hanover | | |
| 1996 | Newton North (3) | Wellesley | Grafton | | |
| 1997 | Winchester (5) | Shepherd Hill | Sutton (5) / Weston | | |
| 1998 | Winchester (6) / Pope Francis Preparatory (2) | Oliver Ames | Weston (2) | | |
| 1999 | Newton North (4) | Oliver Ames (2) / St. Peter-Marian | Marian (2) | | |
| 2000 | Ludlow | East Longmeadow | Hanover (2) | | |
| 2001 | Wachusett | King Philip | Medway / Sutton (6) | | |
| 2002 | Winchester (7) | East Longmeadow | Douglas | | |
| 2003 | Lincoln-Sudbury | Belchertown | Lynnfield | | |
| 2004 | Nashoba | Wellesley (2) | Lynnfield (2) / Sutton (7) | | |
| 2005 | Braintree | Nipmuc | Hopedale | | |
| 2006 | Braintree (2) | Nipmuc (2) | West Boylston | | |
| 2007 | Acton-Boxborough | Oliver Ames (3) | Newburyport | | |
| 2008 | Minnechaug | Duxbury (3) | Newburyport (2) | | |
| 2009 | Algonquin | Cardinal Spellman | Millis | | |
| 2010 | Central Catholic | Medfield | Weston (3) | | |
| 2011 | Peabody | Auburn | Dover-Sherborn | | |
| 2012 | Franklin | Medfield (2) | Weston (4) | | |
| 2013 | Newton North (5) | Notre Dame Academy Hingham | Newburyport (3) | Sutton (8) | |
| 2014 | West Springfield | Hingham | Nipmuc (3) | East Bridgewater | |
| 2015 | Needham (2) | Hingham (2) | Millbury | Monson | |
| 2016 | Central Catholic (2) | Hingham (3) | Millbury (2) | East Bridgewater (2) | |
| 2017 | Wachusett (2) | Danvers | Sutton (9) | Millis (2) | |
| 2018 | Wachusett (3) | Winchester (8) | Norwell | Millis (3) | |
| 2019 | Bishop Feehan | Holliston | South Hadley | Millbury (3) | |
| 2020 | No state tournament due to COVID-19 pandemic | | | | |
| 2021 | Natick | Whitman-Hanson | Norwell (2) | Hamilton-Wenham | Sutton (10) |
| 2022 | Hingham (4) | Silver Lake | Hanover (3) | Cohasset | Sutton (11) |
| 2023 | Natick (2) | Notre Dame Academy Hingham (2) | Norwell (3) | Sutton (12) | Monson (2) |
| 2024 | Wellesley (3) | Masconomet (2) | Nipmuc (4) | Sutton (13) | Douglas (2) |
| 2025 | Natick (3) | Duxbury (4) | Medfield (3) | Sutton (14) | Hull |

==== Most State Championships ====
| Rank | School | Number | Years |
|---|---|---|---|
| 1 | Sutton | 14 | 1991, 1992, 1993, 1995, 1997, 2001, 2004, 2013, 2017, 2021, 2022, 2023, 2024, 2025 |
| 2 | Winchester | 8 | 1983, 1986, 1990, 1995, 1997, 1998, 2002, 2018 |
| 3 | Newton North | 5 | 1989, 1992, 1996, 1999, 2013 |

== See also ==
- Massachusetts Charter School Athletic Organization
- MIAA Division 1A Baseball Tournament
- MIAA Division 1A Boys' Ice Hockey Tournament
- New England Preparatory School Athletic Council
