= Bromfield (surname) =

Bromfield is a surname. Notable people with the surname include:

- Andrew Bromfield (fl. 2000s–2020s), British translator
- Arthur Bromfield (d. 1650), English politician
- Beatrice Bromfield (c. 1880–1966), Australian-born American art dealer
- Dionne Bromfield (born 1996), English singer
- Edmund de Bromfield (d. 1393), English bishop of Llandaff
- Edward Bromfield (fl. 1620s–1630s), Lord Mayor of London in 1636
- Harry Bromfield (1932–2020), South African cricketer
- Henry Bromfield (1610–1683), English politician
- John Bromfield (1922–2005), American actor
- John Bromfield Jr. (1779–1849), American merchant
- Joseph Bromfield (1744–1824), English architect
- Junelle Bromfield (born 1998), Jamaican track and field athlete
- Lois Bromfield (fl. 1980s–2000s), Canadian comedic actress
- Louis Bromfield (1896–1956), American author
- Mary Ellen Bromfield (b. 1928), American actress
- Rex Bromfield (fl. 1970s–2000s), Canadian director
- Richard Bromfield (fl. 1990s–2000s), psychologist
- Robert Bromfield (d. 1647), English merchant and politician
- Valri Bromfield (born 1949), Canadian comedian
- Walter H. C. Bromfield (1884–1963), Australian philatelist
- William Bromfield (1868–1950), English trade unionist and Labour Party Member of Parliament
- William Arnold Bromfield (1801–1851), English botanist

== See also ==
- Bromfield baronets
- Bromfield (disambiguation)
