= Broomfield =

Broomfield may refer to:

== People ==
- Broomfield (surname)

== Places ==
In New Zealand:

- Broomfield, New Zealand, Hurunui District
- Broomfield, Christchurch

In the United Kingdom:

- Broomfield, Aberdeenshire
- Broomfield, Cumbria
- Broomfield, Essex, a suburb of Chelmsford
  - Broomfield Hospital
- Broomfield, Herne Bay, Kent
- Broomfield, Maidstone, Kent
- Broomfield, Somerset
- Broomfield, Wiltshire
- Broomfield House, Enfield, North London, and the surrounding Broomfield Park
- Broomfield School (Arnos Grove), Enfield, North London

In the United States:

- Broomfield, Colorado
- Broomfield Township, Michigan
- Broomfield Rowhouse in Omaha, Nebraska

== Sports venues ==
- New Broomfield, Airdrie, Scotland
- Broomfield Park, Airdrie, Scotland

== See also ==
- Bloomfield (disambiguation)
- Bromfield (disambiguation)
- Brumfield
