= Littleton High School =

Littleton High School is the name of several high schools in the United States:

- Littleton High School (Colorado), Littleton, Colorado
- Littleton High School (Massachusetts), Littleton, Massachusetts
- Littleton High School (New Hampshire), Littleton, New Hampshire
