= Brumfield =

Brumfield is a surname. Notable people with the surname include:

- Don Brumfield (born 1938 in Nicholasville, Kentucky) is an American jockey from Kentucky.
- Jacob Brumfield (born May 27, 1965, in Bogalusa, Louisiana), is a former professional baseball player who played outfield in the Major Leagues from 1992 to 1999.
- Scott Brumfield (born 1970) is a professional football player.
- Thelma Brumfield Dunn (February 6, 1900 - December 31, 1992), medical researcher
- William Craft Brumfield (born 1944), contemporary historian of architecture

== See also ==
- Brumfield, Kentucky
- Brumfield Elementary School
- Bromfield (disambiguation)
- Broomfield (disambiguation)
