= Berkshire County League =

US high school athletic conference

Berkshire County League

The Berkshire County League is a high school athletic conference located in District 1 of the Massachusetts Interscholastic Athletic Association. The league consists of eleven high schools in Berkshire County, Massachusetts. Most of the high schools are public, except the Berkshire Waldorf High School, which is private, and Taconic Vocational High School, which is vocational.

At its height, the league was split into two divisions. The northern division typically consisted of Adams/Hoosac Valley, Drury, Mt. Greylock, Pittsfield, both St. Joseph schools, Taconic, and Waconah. The southern division typically consisted of Chester, Lee, Lenox, McCann Tech, Monument Mountain, Mt. Everett, Searles, and Williams. The league currently has only one division.

== Member schools ==
| School | Location | Mascot | Colors | Year Founded | Enrollment |
|---|---|---|---|---|---|
| Berkshire Waldorf High School^{†} | Stockbridge, Massachusetts | | | 2002 | 37 |
| Drury High School | North Adams, Massachusetts | Blue Devil | Royal Blue, White & Pink | 1843 | 465 |
| Hoosac Valley High School | Cheshire, Massachusetts | Hurricanes | Red & White | 1970 | 299 |
| Lee High School | Lee, Massachusetts | Wildcats | Black & Orange | 1851 | 308 |
| Lenox Memorial High School | Lenox, Massachusetts | Millionaires | Maroon & Gold | 1866 | 446 |
| Monument Mountain Regional High School | Great Barrington, Massachusetts | Spartans | | 1969 | 451 |
| Mount Everett Regional School | Sheffield, Massachusetts | Eagles | | | 281 |
| Mount Greylock Regional School | Williamstown, Massachusetts | Mounties | Gray & Red | | 553 |
| Pittsfield High School | Pittsfield, Massachusetts | Generals | Purple & White | 1850 | 724 |
| Taconic High School | Pittsfield, Massachusetts | Braves | Green & Gold | 1969 | 875 |
| Wahconah Regional High School | Dalton, Massachusetts | Warriors | Blue & White | 1961 | 482 |

† While participating in field soccer teams, the Berkshire Waldorf School does not play other MIAA schools. They are MIAA members, so their students can co-op with other schools in the league.

== Former Members ==
| School | Location | Mascot | Colors | Closed? | Current Conference |
|---|---|---|---|---|---|
| Adams Memorial High School | Adams, Massachusetts | | | Yes | N/A |
| Charles H. McCann Technical School | North Adams, Massachusetts | Hornets | Green & White | No | Pioneer Valley Interscholastic Athletic Conference |
| Chester High School | Chester, Massachusetts | | | Yes | N/A |
| Searles High School | Great Barrington, Massachusetts | Mustangs | Buff & Blue | Yes | N/A |
| St. Joseph Central High School | Pittsfield, Massachusetts | Crusaders | Purple & Gold | Yes | N/A |
| St. Joseph's School | North Adams, Massachusetts | | | Yes | N/A |
| Williams High School | Stockbridge, Massachusetts | Indians | Green & Gold | Yes | N/A |

== State Champions ==
List of state championships won by teams while a part of the conference:

=== Football ===
Note: From 1972 to 2012, football state championships were separated by region, so there would be multiple champions from each division. From 1972 to 1977 and from 1997 to 2008, it was split between Eastern Mass and Central/Western Mass, with two champions in each division. From 1978 to 1996 and from 2009 to 2012, Central and Western Mass split, resulting in three champions in each division. In 2013, everything was combined and therefore only allowed one state champion per division.

- Taconic - 1974 D2 Central/Western
- Hoosac Valley - 1979, 1980, 1987, 1989, 1992, 2009 D2 Western
- Drury - 1982, 1988 D2 Western
- Waconah - 1983, 1988, 2012 D2 Western; 1998 D2A Central/Western; 2003 D2 Central/Western
- Monument Mountain - 1990, 1996 D2 Western
- St. Joseph's Central - 1991, 1995 D2 Western
- Lee - 1993, 1994 D2 Western
- Mt. Greylock - 1999 D2A Central/Western; 2000 D2 Central/Western, 2010, 2011, 2012 D3 Western

=== Cross Country ===
==== Boys ====
- Lenox - 2022 D3

==== Girls ====
- Pittsfield - 1987 D1
- Mt. Greylock - 1990, 1992, 1993, 1994, 2017 D2; 2021 D3
- Lenox - 2019 D2

=== Volleyball ===
- Mt. Greylock - 2023 D5

=== Soccer ===
==== Boys ====
- Monument Mountain - 1974 D2
- Mt. Greylock - 1995 D3; 2008 D2

==== Girls ====
- Waconah - 1986 D2

=== Basketball ===
==== Boys ====
- Lenox - 1974 D3
- St. Joseph Central - 1988 D3
- Taconic - 2020 D2 (Co-champs with Whitman-Hanson Regional High School); 2023 D5
- Hoosac Valley - 2026 D5

==== Girls ====
- Lenox - 1984, 1992 D3
- Monument Mountain - 1986, 2000 D2
- Lee - 1989, 1990, 1991, 1993, 1997, 2003, 2010 D3
- Hoosac Valley - 2019, 2020 (Co-champs with St. Mary's High School) D3; 2024 D5
- Taconic - 2020 (Co-champs with Foxborough High School) D2

=== Ice Hockey ===
==== Boys ====
- St. Joseph's Central - 1973 D2

=== Winter Swim & Dive ===
==== Girls ====
- St. Joseph's Central - 1993 D1

=== Alpine Ski ===
==== Boys ====
- Pittsfield - 1980, 1988
- Monument Mountain - 1987
- Taconic - 1994
- Mt. Greylock - 1995, 1996
- St. Joseph's Central - 2000

==== Girls ====
- Pittsfield - 1981, 1982, 1989, 1990, 1993–1997
- Mt. Greylock - 1998, 2000–2003
- Taconic - 2007

=== Nordic Ski ===
==== Boys ====
- Lenox - 1987–1991, 1993, 1996, 1999, 2005
- Mount Greylock -1992, 1994, 1997, 1998, 2000, 2001, 2002, 2006–2009, 2011–2017, 2020, 2022, 2023, 2025, 2026
- Waconah - 1995
- Hoosac Valley - 2003, 2004

==== Girls ====
- Lenox - 1987, 1988, 1990, 1993, 1994, 1996–2003, 2005, 2006, 2007, 2020
- Mt. Greylock - 1989, 1992, 1995, 2008–2012, 2016, 2017, 2018, 2019 (Co-champs with Concord-Carlisle High School), 2024-2026

=== Baseball ===
- St. Joseph's Central - 1972, 1975 D2
- Drury - 1978 D2
- Taconic - 2017 D1; 2019, 2021 D3

=== Lacrosse ===
==== Boys ====
- Waconah - 2022 D4

=== Outdoor Track ===
==== Girls ====
- Mount Greylock - 2025 D6
