= Prospect Hill Academy Charter School =

Coordinates: 42°22′01.47″N 71°06′02.46″W

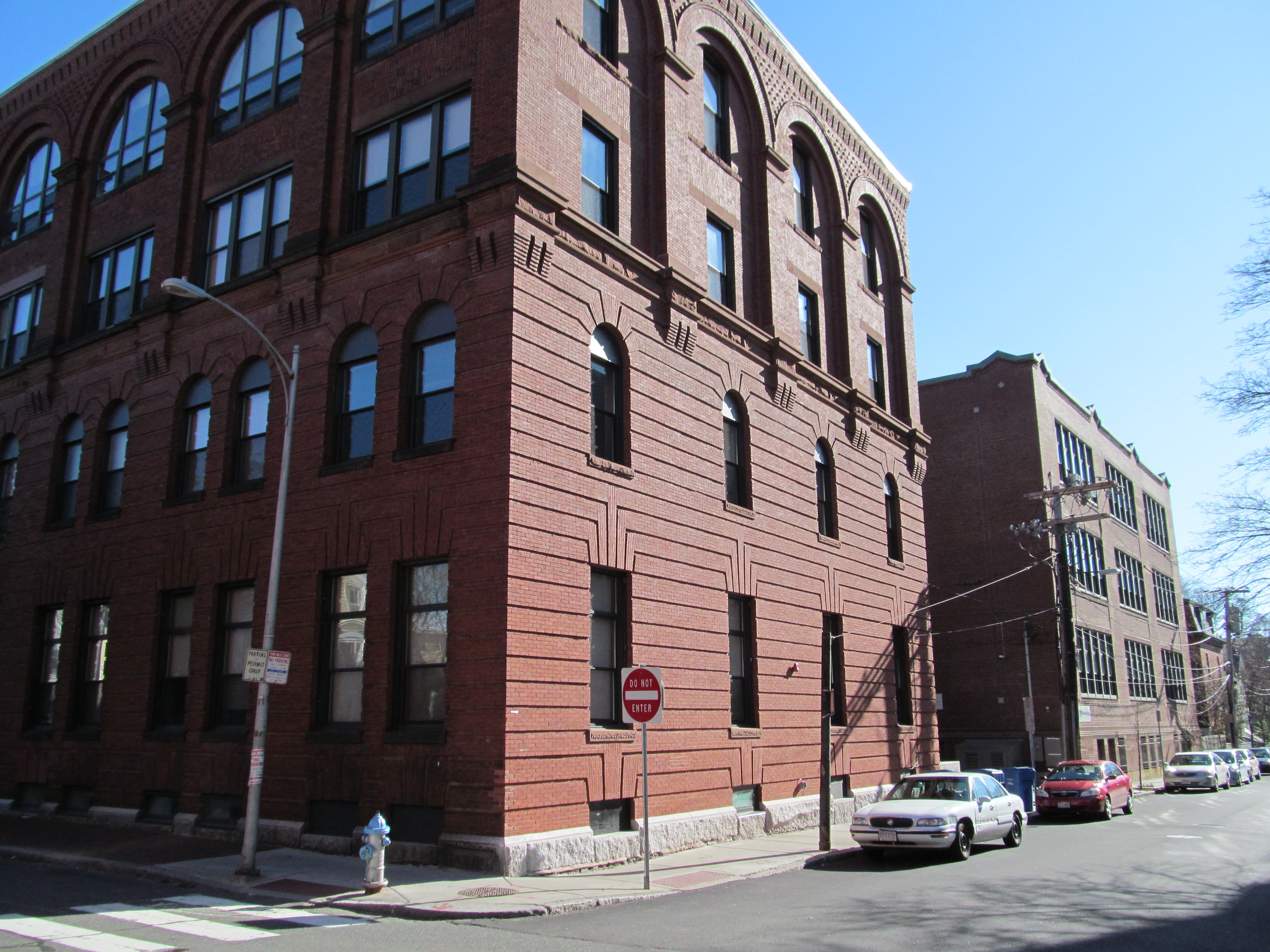

Location
- 50 Essex Street; Cambridge, Massachusetts 02139; United States

Information
- School type: Public, Charter school
- Established: 1996
- Status: Open
- Superintendent: Angela F. Allen
- Head of school: Angela F. Allen
- Staff: 173
- Teaching staff: 98
- Grades: K-12
- Enrollment: 1139
  - Kindergarten: 88
  - Grade 1: 89
  - Grade 2: 89
  - Grade 3: 82
  - Grade 4: 97
  - Grade 5: 96
  - Grade 6: 99
  - Grade 7: 96
  - Grade 8: 96
  - Grade 9: 93
  - Grade 10: 83
  - Grade 11: 73
  - Grade 12: 48
- Classes: 407
- Student to teacher ratio: 11.7:1
- Hours in school day: 7:45am - 4:45pm
- Song: "Busy Bee" song
- Sports: Baseball, Basketball, Cheerleading, Cross-country, Soccer, Softball, Track, Volleyball
- Mascot: The Wizard
- Team name: PHA Wizards
- Accreditation: NEASC
- National ranking: 499 (2013 U.S. News & World Report)
- Budget: 16000 per pupil (2013 estimate)
- MCAS % proficient and advanced: ELA: 100; Math: 94; Science: 76 (Grade 10 Spring 2012)
- Website: www.phacs.org

Prospect Hill Academy Charter School (PHA) is a college preparatory charter public school serving grades PreK - 12 in Somerville, Massachusetts and Cambridge, Massachusetts. The school was founded in 1996.

PHA serves nearly 900 students, 91% are people of color, nearly two-thirds are low-income, and approximately half come from homes where English is not the primary language spoken.

== Campuses ==
Prospect Hill Academy is located on three campuses in Somerville, Massachusetts and Cambridge, Massachusetts:

1. The Early Childhood Campus, serving grades PreK-2, is located at 15 Webster Avenue, Somerville, in Union Square (Somerville).
2. The Upper Elementary Campus, serving grades 3-5, is located at 17 Franklin Street, in East Somerville.
3. The Middle School and High School Campus, serving grades 6-12, is located at 50-54 Essex Street, Cambridge, near Central Square (Cambridge). Grades 6-8 (Middle School) is at 50 Essex and 9-12 (High School & Collegiate Institute) is at 54 Essex.

== Extracurricular activities ==
=== Athletics ===
Prospect Hill Academy is a member of the Massachusetts Charter School Athletic Organization. Sports offerings include soccer, basketball, baseball, softball, volleyball, cheerleading, cross-country running, and track.

=== Clubs and publications ===
High School clubs have included the Art Club, Chess Club, EPICS, Gay Straight Alliance, Junior State of America, Knitting, Sign Language, Video Production, and the Yearbook as well as athletic clubs such as Dance club, Boys Fitness, and Girls Fitness. In the Fall of 2012 clubs included: Fundamentals of Art, Dance Club, 9th Grade Choir, HAIRitage, Hip Hop 101, Self Defense, Pumped Up Kicks, and Drum Line Upper Elementary clubs include: the drama club, the Improv Olympics club, the newspaper club, the dance club, the ski and snowboard club, the flag football club, and the basketball club.
