= Big Three Conference =

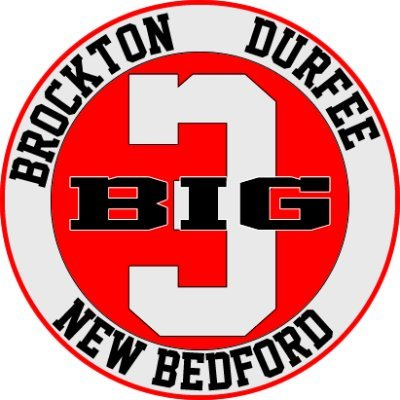
- Founded: 1990; 2024
- Folded: 2019
- Organizing body: MIAA
- No. of teams: 3

Big Three Conference

The Big Three Conference (Big 3) is a high school athletic conference located in District 8 of the Massachusetts Interscholastic Athletic Association. The league was founded in 1990 by high schools Brockton, Durfee, and New Bedford.

== History ==
The Big Three was created when Brockton, Durfee, and New Bedford found themselves in a difficult situation during the 1989-1990 season. Due to realignment, the Southeastern Conference dissolved into the Pilgrim Conference and Eastern Coastal League. Durfee and New Bedford were left out of these conferences due to their size. The end of the Suburban League put Brockton in a similar position. The Big 3 became a place where the three similarly sized schools could schedule competitive games across all sports.

At the end of the 2018-19 season, New Bedford left the conference due to declining numbers, causing the rest to leave. The members would come back together in 2019 to create the Southeast Conference, along with Dartmouth High School and Bridgewater-Raynham Regional High School.

The conference returned in 2024, with the same three members all leaving the Southeast Conference.

== Member Schools ==
School	Location	Mascot	Colors	Year Founded	Enrollment
Brockton High School	Brockton, Massachusetts	Boxers	Black & Red	1870	3,598
B.M.C. Durfee High School	Fall River, Massachusetts	Hilltoppers	Red & Black	1887	2,435
New Bedford High School	New Bedford, Massachusetts	Whalers	Red & White	1827	2,878

== State Championships ==
This is a list of MIAA State championships won by schools while a part of the Big Three Conference

=== Football ===
Note: From 1972 to 2012, football state championships were separated by region, so there was multiple champions from each division. From 1972 to 1977 and from 1997 to 2008, it was split between Eastern Mass and Central/Western Mass with two champions in each division. From 1978 to 1996 and from 2009 to 2012 Central and Western Mass split, so there was three champions in each division. In 2013 everything was combined, so only one state champion per division was allowed.

- Brockton - 1991, 1992, 1996 D1A Eastern; 2004, 2005 D1 Eastern
- New Bedford - 1993, 1994 D1A Eastern

=== Fall Volleyball ===
- New Bedford - 1994, 2009 D1

=== Cross Country ===
Boys

- Brockton - 2005, 2006 D1

Girls

- Durfee - 1990 D1

=== Soccer ===
Boys

- Brockton - 2017 D1

=== Basketball ===
Boys

- Brockton - 2012 D1
- New Bedford - 1993, 1994 D1

Girls

- Brockton - 1991, 2001 D1

=== Indoor Track ===
Boys

- Brockton - 1991 (Co-Champs with St. John's), 1991–1994, 1996, 2000, 2001 D1
- New Bedford - 2011 D1

=== Baseball ===
- Brockton - 1997 D1
- Durfee - 1995 D1
- New Bedford - 1993, 1994, 1998 D1

=== Softball ===
- Brockton - 2000 D1
- Durfee - 1998, 2004 D1

=== Outdoor Track ===
Boys

- Brockton - 1991, 1992, 1996, 2000 All-State
- New Bedford - 1993, 1995, 2002 All-State

=== Spring Volleyball ===
- New Bedford - 1991, 1993–1995, 1997–1999
