= Longmeadow High School =

Coordinates: 42°03′20.34″N 72°33′37.32″W

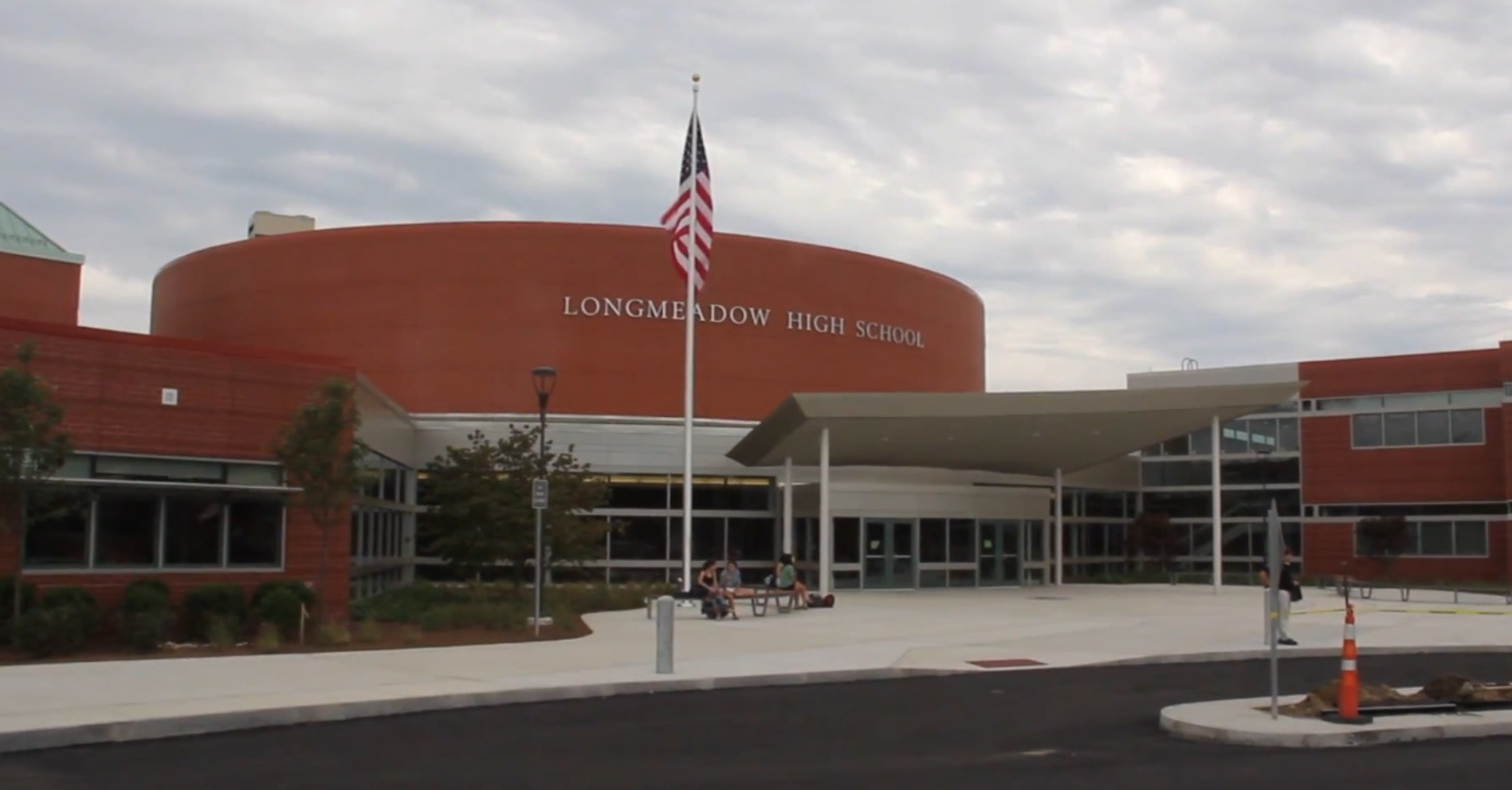
- 95 Grassy Gutter Road; Longmeadow, MA 01106; United States

Information
- Type: Public; Open enrollment
- Established: 1956
- Principal: Thomas Landers
- Teaching staff: 79.66 (FTE)
- Grades: 9–12
- Enrollment: 911 (2023-2024)
- Student to teacher ratio: 11.44
- Campus: Suburban
- Colors: Black and White
- Mascot: Lancer
- Newspaper: The Jet Jotter thejetjotter.com
- Yearbook: Masacksic
- Website: lhs.longmeadow.k12.ma.us

Longmeadow High School (LHS) is an American public high school located in Longmeadow, Massachusetts. Founded in 1956, it enrolls approximately 1,000 students. The school's mascot is a Lancer.

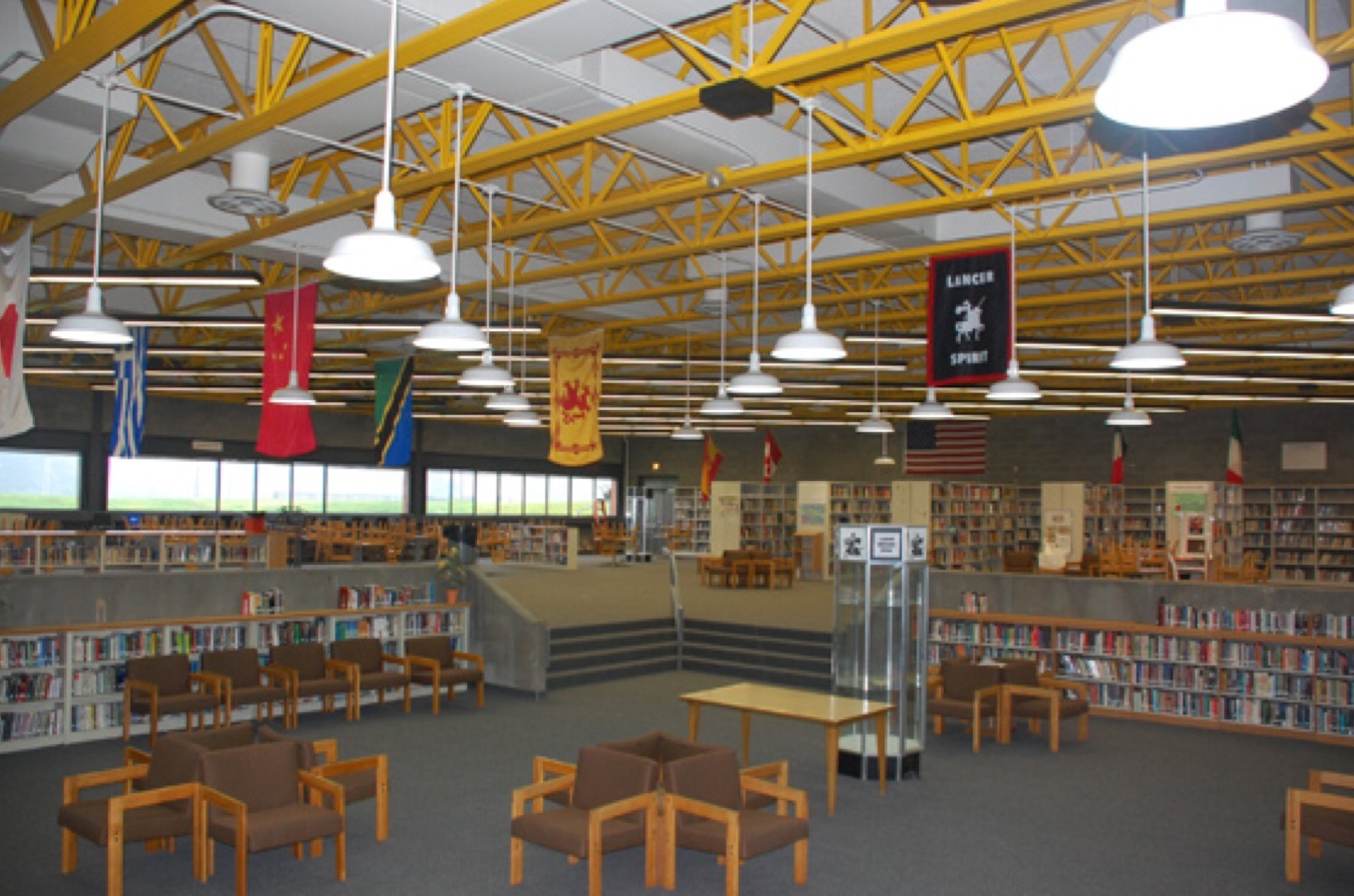
The original library in the 1971 addition. The space is now occupied by the fitness room, back gym, and health classes.

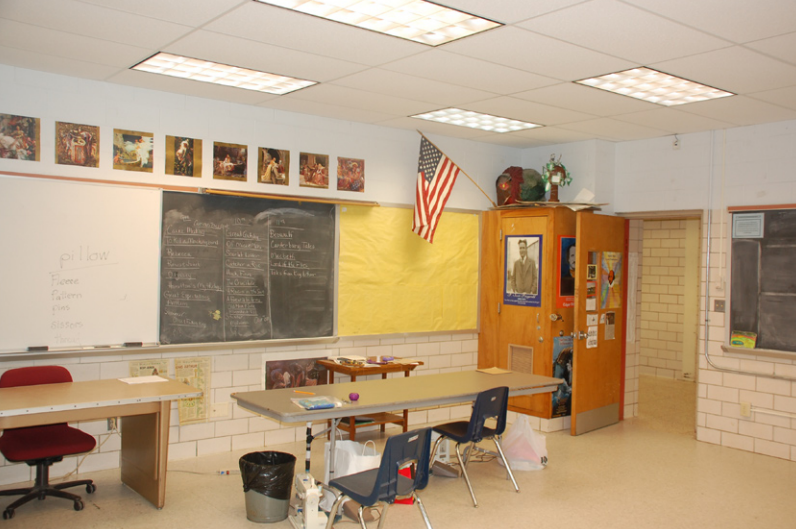
A history classroom in the 1964 wing.

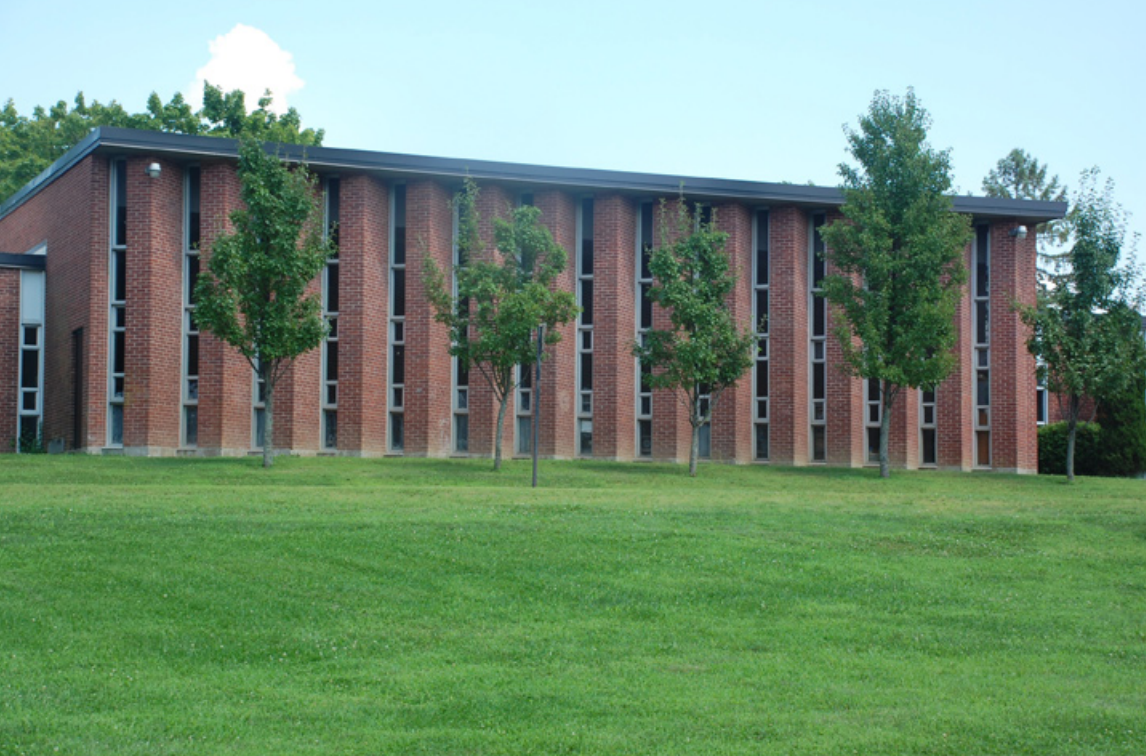
The art department in the former high school.

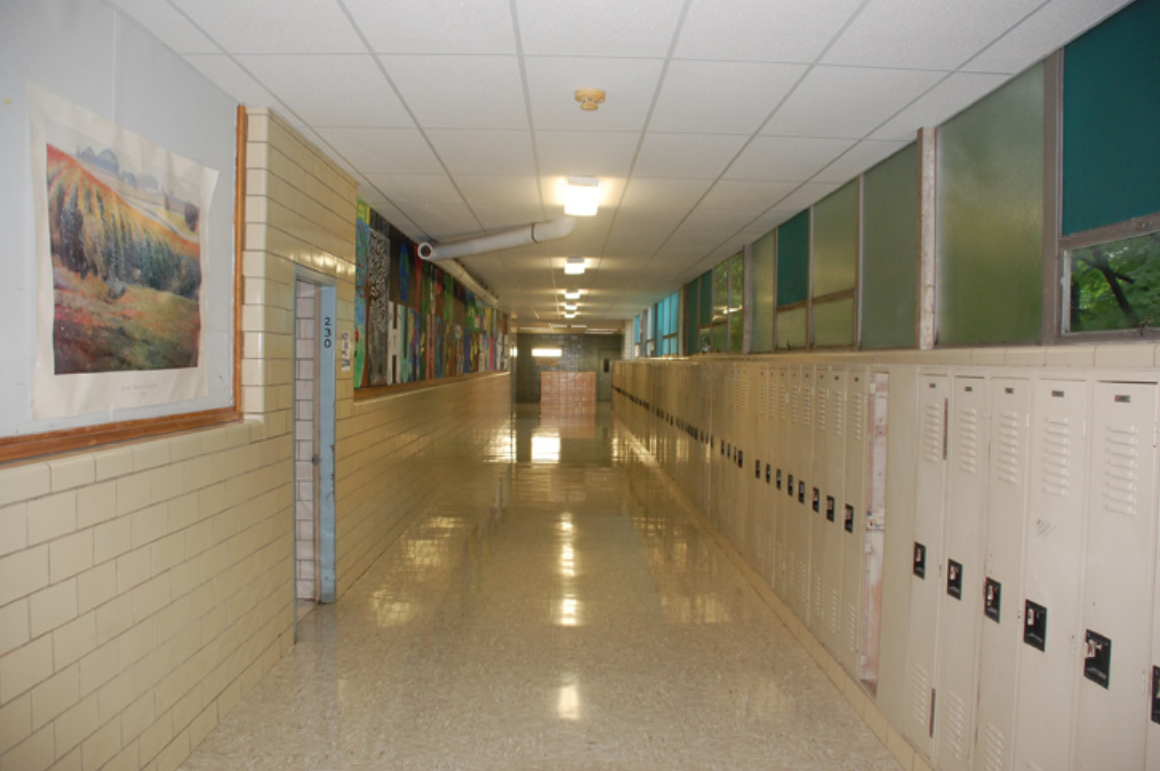
A corridor in the original building.

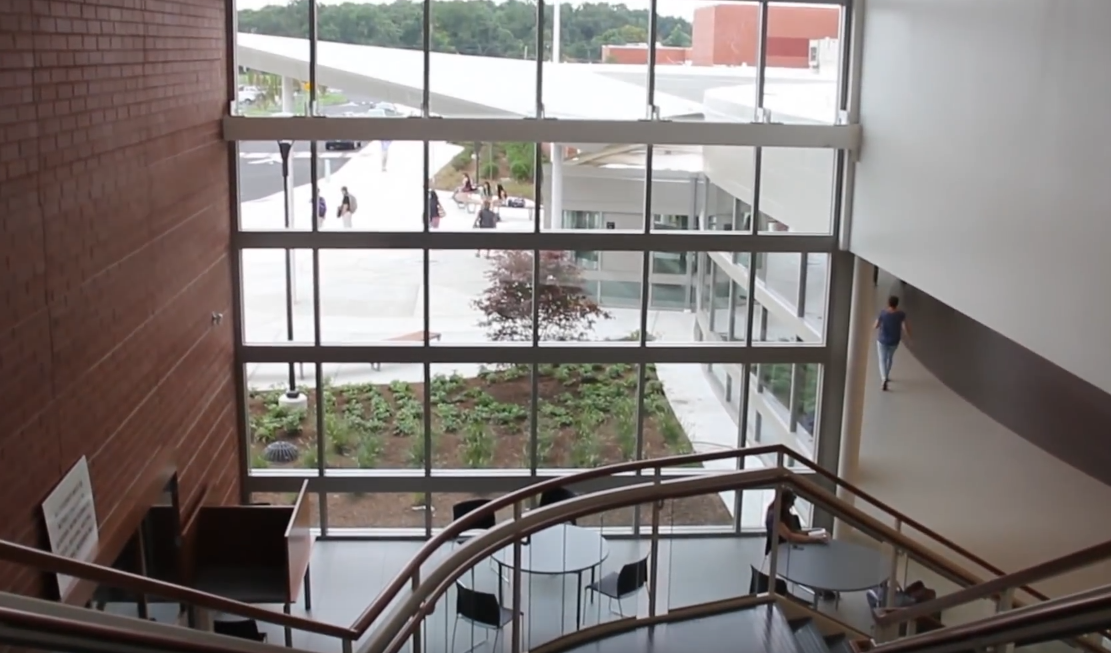
The view of the outdoors from the Grand Stair.

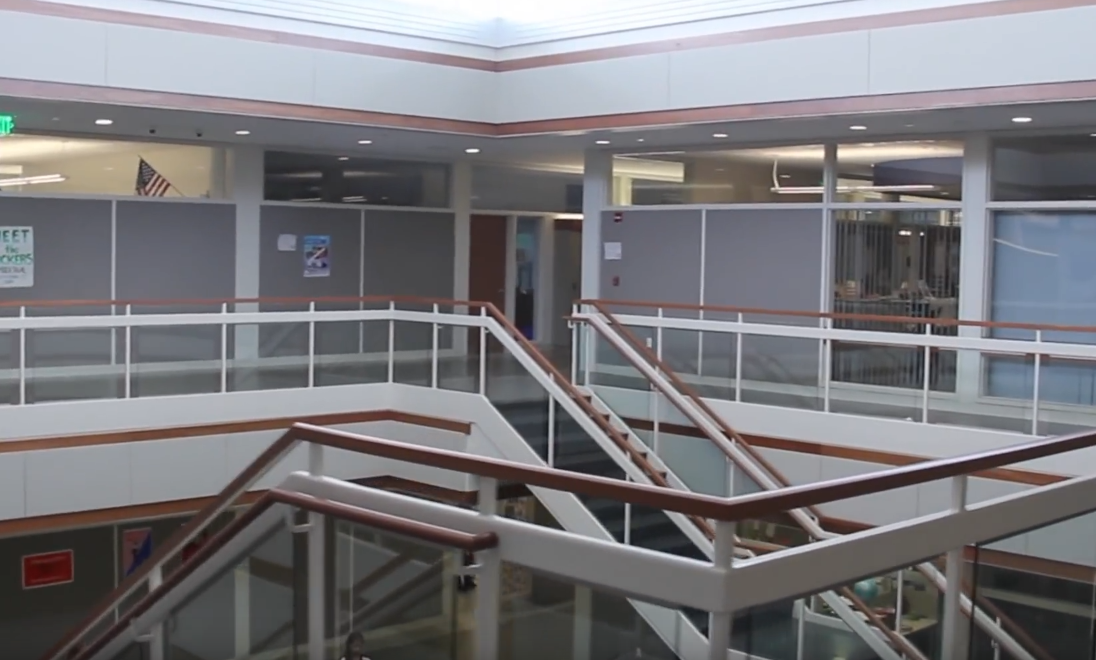
The balcony overlooking Seminar B.

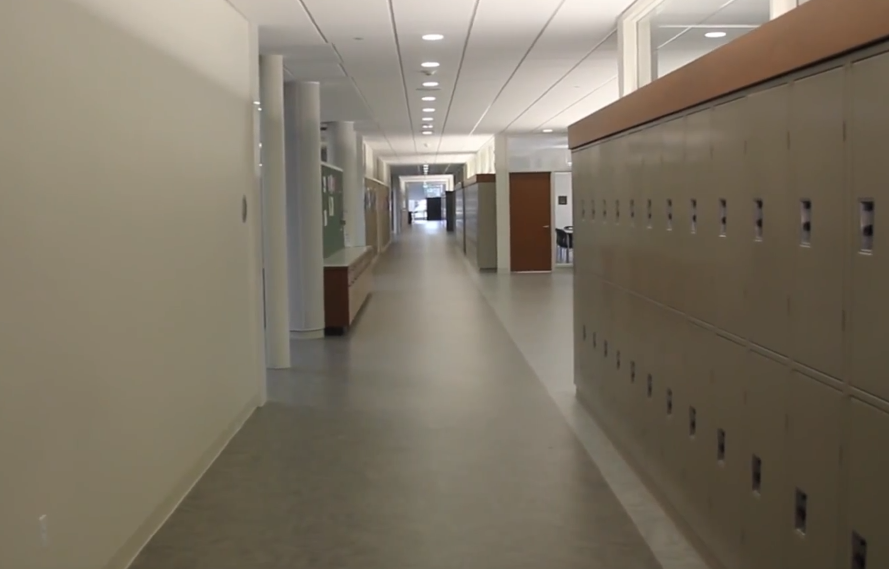
A hallway leading to Seminar A.

It was ranked as the sixth best public school in Massachusetts in a 2011 report by Newsweek. 96% of graduates continue their studies at the college level.

== New school building ==
The original high school building was replaced by a new building. The original building was demolished with the exception of the 1971 science wing, which at the time included the swimming pool, library spaces, science classrooms, and a large open classroom known as the business technology center. Construction began in 2011 and continued until April 2013. The renovated natatorium (swimming pool) and locker rooms opened in the fall of 2012, and the new school building which was constructed southeast of the original building opened on February 25, 2013, following the school's winter vacation. The new building consists of a new core section with the auditorium at its center and surrounded by a circular lobby. Around the lobby in this portion are the cafeteria, school office, library, computer lab, and special subject classrooms.

The main two-story academic wing housing most of the school's classrooms extends out to the west from the core lobby area. North of the core lobby is the new gymnasium and athletic and physical education spaces as well as the renovated 1971 wing which was completed during the summer of 2013. The reused wing was nearly completely gutted on the inside and received a completely new brick facade to match the new 2013 building with only the swimming pool and its locker rooms remaining laid out as they were originally built.

The portion of the wing where the media center was now contains the fitness center, a new PE room containing a wooden dance floor, the health classroom, and a new business technology center. The northernmost part of the wing is separated from the school proper by security doors. It contains the offices of the school department and LCTV, the town's community access TV channel.

A parking lot and drop-off now occupies the space where the former building stood. A new athletic field is located where the former student parking lot was located.

A ceremony was held in September 2013 for the completion of the new high school building. The new school was built at an estimated cost of $78.4 million, and was partially funded by the Massachusetts School Building Authority. The town's portion was $44 million and included required matching funds for the MSBA's portion of the project as well as the full costs for the demolition and renovation parts of the project as they were outside the scope of the MSBA's approved program.

== Original school building ==
The original school was constructed in 1954, with subsequent additions in 1958, 1963, 1971, 1999, and 2009. The renovations created courtyards surrounded by corridors. By the turn of the millennium, the high school supported a peak occupancy of approximately 3,000 students.

Years of mistreatment had caused serious maintenance issues over the years. In 2009, the district appropriated money to refurbish the media center, which at the time was located in the 1971 wing. In 2010, demand for a new school grew until the town voted in favor of constructing a new state-of-the-art facility. District offices were demolished the same year to make way for the proposed academic wing.

Faculty and staff moved into the new building in February 2013 and by April, the building was gone.

== Athletics ==
=== Field Hockey ===
Longmeadow's Field Hockey's team won its first state title in 2022, after seven previous final appearances. This was the final game for head Coach Ann Simons, who had coached the program since 1981 and was awarded the Massachusetts and New England coach of the year for 2022 by Max Field Hockey.

== Programs ==
=== Quiz bowl ===
In June 2010, Longmeadow High School won the championship of the WGBH TV program, High School Quiz Show, defeating The Bromfield School in the final match. The school also competed in the WGBY-TV quiz show, As Schools Match Wits, where their 2010 and 2015 teams reached the finals and their 2022 team won the championship.

== Notable alumni ==
- Eric Lesser, State senator for Massachusetts
- Brynn Cartelli – Season 14 winner of NBC's The Voice
- Steve Courson – offensive guard for NFL's Pittsburgh Steelers and Tampa Bay Buccaneers, 2-time Super Bowl champion
- John DeLuca – actor; played Butchy in Teen Beach Movie
- Meghann Fahy – actress on Broadway and television; singer; known for her role as Natalie Goodman in Next to Normal on Broadway and as Daphne Sullivan in "The White Lotus"
- Jay Heaps – former soccer player and former coach of the New England Revolution from 2011 to 2017.
- Andrea Leers – Class of 1960; Principal of Leers-Weinzapfel Associates, recipient of 2007 American Institute of Architects Firm Award
- Aaron Lewis – lead singer of the alternative metal band Staind
- Bridget Moynahan – actress, star of films such as John Wick, I, Robot and The Recruit and TV series Blue Bloods
- Alicia Ouellette – President and dean of Albany Law School
- Joe Philbin – assistant head coach of NFL's Indianapolis Colts, former head coach of Miami Dolphins
- Hilary Purrington – composer
- Joey Santiago – lead guitarist of The Pixies
