= West Springfield High School (Massachusetts) =

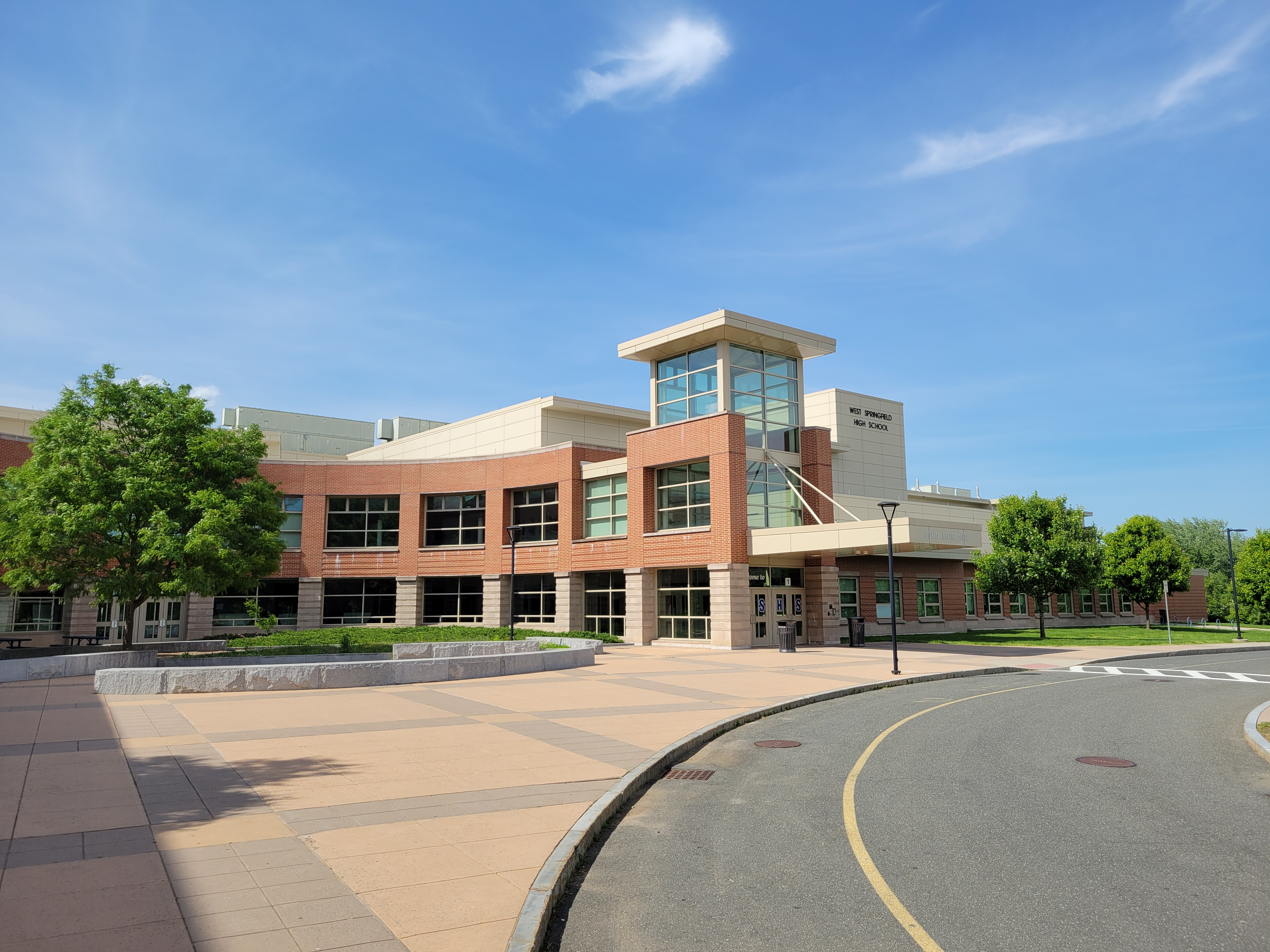
- West Springfield High School

Location
- 425 Piper Rd; West Springfield, MA 01089; United States; 42°7′14.9″N 72°38′22.4″W

Information
- Type: Public; High School; Open enrollment
- Motto: We Bleed Blue and White
- Established: 1915
- School district: West Springfield Public Schools
- Superintendent: Stefania Raschilla
- Principal: Patrick Danby
- Vice-Principals: Erin Panteleakis; Hank Giardin; Maria Silvestri
- Teaching staff: 93.97 (FTE)
- Grades: 9–12
- Enrollment: 1,231 (2024–2025)
- Student to teacher ratio: 13.10
- Campus size: 273,300 sq ft (25,390 m^{2})
- Colors: Blue and white
- Mascot: Terrier
- Rival: Agawam High School
- Newspaper: The Terrier Times
- Website: www.wsps.org/Our-Schools/West-Springfield-High-School

West Springfield High School, in Massachusetts, United States, is the city of West Springfield's high school. It is located near West Springfield Middle School and John R. Fausey Elementary, one of the city's five elementary schools. The school's mascot is the terrier.

== History ==
The high school has its origins in a school built on the town common in 1820. That school appears on the West Springfield seal. The town's 1875 town hall, located where the senior center is now, included classrooms for the town's first high school. In 1915, the cornerstone was laid for a dedicated high school building, now known as Cowing School. It opened in 1916 under William A. Cowing, principal from 1916 to 1946.

In the face of significant overcrowding and with growing numbers of students after World War II, the town approved a new high school building on Piper Road, which was begun in 1954 just south of the current high school building. The school was opened in 1956 for grades 9–12. The original plan, rejected in 1952, was for a 1500-student high school. To reduce costs, a 1000-student building was constructed instead. The new building quickly became overcrowded, and ninth graders were moved to Cowing School in 1960, until an addition, doubling the capacity of the high school, was opened in 1966. To relieve elementary school overcrowding in the 1990s, a wing of the high school was used as the Piper Road School for the town's sixth graders until the middle school was opened in 1998. The 1956 high school building was used until the current building opened in February 2014, after which it was demolished.

On March 13, 2020 West Springfield High School, and all public schools part of LPVEC were closed until March 27, 2020 due to COVID-19. This closure was extended to April 6, and again to May 4. On April 21, 2020, Massachusetts governor Charlie Baker closed all schools in the state for the remainder of the 2019–2020 school year.

== Sports ==
The motto of the school's sports teams is We Bleed Blue and White, referring to the school's colors.

The school has a physical education facility, with one gymnasium, including three full-size basketball courts, volleyball courts, and an indoor walking track. It also has Clark Field, where football, soccer, lacrosse, and field hockey are played, six tennis courts, and a 25-yard, six lane pool. It offers 27 different MIAA-sanctioned sports, including:
Fall:

- Soccer - boys and girls (Varsity, JV, Freshman) (Boys 2013 Massachusetts Division I State Champions) (Girls 2014 Massachusetts Division I State Champions)
- Cross country - boys and girls (Varsity, JV)
- Football (Varsity, JV, Freshman)
- Field hockey (Varsity, JV)
- Girls' volleyball (Varsity, JV)
- Golf (Varsity)
- Cheerleading (Varsity, JV)

Winter:

- Wrestling (Varsity, JV)
- Ice hockey (Varsity)
- Indoor track - boys and girls (Varsity, JV)
- Basketball - boys and girls (Varsity, JV, Freshman)
- Cheerleading (Varsity, JV)
- Swimming - boys and girls (Varsity)

Spring:

- Boys' volleyball (Varsity, JV)
- Baseball (Varsity, JV, Freshman)
- Lacrosse - boys and girls (Varsity, JV)
- Outdoor track - boys and girls (Varsity, JV)
- Softball (Varsity, JV, Freshman)
- Tennis - boys and girls (Varsity)

=== New high school ===
The renovation of the school's athletic field "Clark Field" was completed for the beginning of the fall 2012 sport season. The field features an artificial turf for football, soccer, field hockey, and lacrosse games, new red track, permanent bleachers, a concession stand, and tennis courts. The official opening and ribbon cutting took place on November 17, 2012.

The new building was completed in February 2014. After February break, the students and staff moved into the new facility. The building includes a new 25 yard pool, large gymnasium, indoor walking track, new library, cafeteria, and auditorium. The building is located next door to the old building which is now demolished and has turned into a new parking lot and practice soccer fields.

== Notable alumni ==
- Tim Daggett (born 1962), Olympic gold medalist in gymnastics
- Joe Ragland (born 1989), American-Liberian basketball player for Hapoel Holon of the Israeli Basketball Premier League
- Mike Scully (born 1956), Executive Producer and Showrunner of The Simpsons
