= Oliver Ames High School =

Coordinates: 42°03′21.36″N 71°06′40.17″W

- 100 Lothrop Street; North Easton, MA; 02356; United States

Information
- Type: Public
- Established: 1905
- School district: Easton
- Principal: Kelly Cavanaugh
- Staff: 86.64 (FTE)
- Grades: 9–12
- Enrollment: 1,076 (2023–2024)
- Student to teacher ratio: 12.42
- Colors: Black & Orange
- Athletics conference: Hockomock League
- Mascot: Tiger
- Website: Page on eastonmaschools.org

Oliver Ames High School is a public high school in Easton, Massachusetts, United States. The school currently enrolls approximately 1200 students in grades 9 through 12 and is named after Oliver Ames, who was the 35th governor of Massachusetts. Oliver Ames offers Advanced Placement, Honors, college preparatory, business, and standard programs, as well as electives in the visual and performing arts, business and industrial arts, and home economics.

In sports, Oliver Ames competes in the Hockomock League where their teams have many achievements, including winning numerous championships.

In 2007, the baseball team captured its first-ever MIAA Division 2 State Championship.

The girls basketball program has won 3 MIAA Division 2 State Championships taking home the title in 2006, 2010, and 2022.

The Oliver Ames Tiger Marching Band represented the Commonwealth of Massachusetts in the 2012 Memorial Day parade in Washington D.C. The OAMB also recently won the schools first back to back to back NESBA championships since the 90's by winning the 2021, 2022, and 2023 Division IV Championships.

== Notable alumni ==
- Jim Craig, a member and goalie of the 1980 U.S. Olympic hockey team that defeated the Soviet Olympic hockey team, made famous by the movie Miracle on Ice.
- Ruth Graves Wakefield, inventor of the chocolate chip cookie.
- David MacKinnon, Professional baseball player for the Los Angeles Angels and Oakland Athletics.

== Facilities ==
=== Muscato Stadium ===
Named after the coach, Valentine P. Muscato, who led the football team to six league championships and three undefeated seasons resulting in state championships. The stadium features a state of the art 400-meter track and a turf field for school athletics, which also served as the home of the Real Boston Rams of the USL Premier Development League.

=== William Nixon gymnasium ===
The gym is home to Boys and Girls basketball, and as home to the girls volleyball team in the fall. The gym, which seats around 1200 people, was built in 2006. The gymnasium is named for William [Bill] Nixon a long time Social Studies/History teacher at Oliver Ames.

=== Frothingham Park ===
Located just a few blocks from campus the historic park designed by Fredric Law Olmsted is the home to the Oliver Ames Tigers baseball team. "The park" as most townies refer to it, was also the home to the Tigers football team before Muscato stadium was constructed.
