= Bromfield =

Bromfield may refer to:

== People ==
- Bromfield (surname)

== Places ==
- Bromfield, Cumbria
- Bromfield, Shropshire
- Bromfield and Yale

== Other uses ==
- The Bromfield School in Harvard, Massachusetts
