= 1980 Massachusetts Proposition 2½ =

Referendum limiting taxation

Proposition 2½ (Mass. Gen. L. c. 59, § 21C) is a Massachusetts statute that limits property tax assessments and, secondarily, automobile excise tax levies by Massachusetts municipalities. The name of the initiative refers to the 2.5% ceiling on total property taxes annually as well as the 2.5% limit on property tax increases. It was passed by ballot measure, specifically called an initiative petition within Massachusetts state law for any form of referendum voting, in 1980 and went into effect in 1982. The effort to enact the proposition was led by the anti-tax group Citizens for Limited Taxation. It is similar to other "tax revolt" measures passed around the same time in other parts of the United States. This particular proposition followed the movements of states such as California.

== Results ==
Results by county: Yes: 50–60%; 60–70%; No: 50–60%; 60–70%

Proposition 2½ appeared with five other initiatives presented to Massachusetts voters on November 4, 1980. It was question 2 on the ballot, "Limiting local taxes (Proposition 2 1/2)".

Response	Votes	%
Yes	1,438,768	56%
No	988,839	40%
blank	129,060	5%

== Real and personal property taxes ==
Under Proposition 2½, a municipality is subject to two property tax limits:

1. Ceiling: The total annual property tax revenue raised by a municipality shall not exceed 2.5% of the assessed value of all taxable property contained in it.
2. Increase limit: The annual increase of property tax cannot exceed 2.5%, plus the amount attributable to taxes that are from new real property.

These limits refer to the entire amount of the annual tax levy raised by a municipality. The property taxes are the sum of: (a) residential real property; (b) commercial real property; (c) industrial real property; and (d) business-owned personal property. In practice, it usually limits the tax bills of individual taxpayers, but only as an indirect result. The limits for each community are calculated by the Massachusetts Department of Revenue.

A side effect of Proposition 2½ is that municipality income will decline in real terms whenever inflation rises above 2.5%. Historically inflation has been above 2.5% for a significant majority of the years since 1980 (22 out of the 28 years up to 2008), thus resulting in a real decline in local tax rates and local spending ability.

An exception allows the citizens of each municipality to override the 2½ restriction to address specific needs of the community thus giving the citizens direct control over their taxation.

== Vehicle excise tax ==
The excise tax for automobiles registered in Massachusetts was also lowered by Proposition 2½. Previously, this tax was levied at a rate of $66.00 per $1,000 of car valuation (6.6%). Proposition 2½ lowered this rate to $25.00 per $1,000 of car valuation, resulting in a 2½ per cent excise tax rate, but can still increase 264%, to the previous 6.6% tax rate if a Proposition 2½ operational override (see below) is approved by ballot in a community during a general (or special referendum) election.

== Exclusions ==
Proposition 2½ excludes four cases from the limitation on tax levy increases:

- "New growth": The Act allows for new growth. So, for example, when a new house is built, the tax levy may increase by the amount of taxes collected from that house.

And three types of exclusions granted by the majority of those voting in a municipal referendum:

- "Capital exclusion": Capital expenditure for the upcoming fiscal year;
- "Debt exclusion": For pre-1980 municipal debt or new debt issued for a designated purpose (e.g. bonds issued for a multi-year capital expense); or
- Water/sewer debt: For certain water and sewer system debt.

== Overrides and underrides ==
Municipalities may exceed or reduce the limits with the prior approval of the majority of those voting in a municipal referendum:

- "Operational override": Override the increase limit.
- "Underride": The levy limit is reduced. Such a vote can be started by the Massachusetts initiative petition procedure, or the municipal legislature.

The proposition originally required a two-thirds majority of voters for passage of overrides, but the state legislature changed this to a simple majority in 1981. State law still requires a two-thirds vote of the municipal "appropriating authority" to place an override question on the ballot.

As of January 2009, municipalities had requested, via referendum, 4,449 overrides of Proposition 2½, of which 1,798 passed; 16 underrides were requested, of which nine passed.

== Outcomes ==
Following the mandating of actual revenue reductions within the first couple of years, the effects and results of Proposition 2½ were limited. The lack of significant changes was due in part to the state government increasing general purpose aid to municipalities, which helped them to stay away from budget shortfalls. Effective property tax rates declining and an increase in community taxes were a result of various factors including a 64% increase in real estate aid to municipalities between 1981 and 1988, declining school expenses, and a region wide real estate boom. Reduced revenues in the 1980s caused the state to reduce local aid, which fell 12% in 1990, along with over 30% between 1989 and 1992. Over time, Proposition 2½ would have become more binding due to the fact that it is operated in nominal terms, meaning that the rules it follows do not change in response to prices, costs, or spending.

== Rate split and exemptions ==
While Proposition 2½ constrains the overall amount of taxation, a 1979 law (as amended) determines how that tax burden is allocated.

Amendment CXII to the Massachusetts Constitution (the "Classification Amendment") was adopted in 1978, and allowed the state legislature to define up to four classes of real estate upon which property taxes could be levied at different rates. State law now defines those four categories as: residential, open space, commercial, and industrial. (This was in response to a Massachusetts Supreme Court ruling that forbade the previous practice of artificially lowering some assessments.)

Municipalities may levy property taxes at different rates by adjusting the "residential factor", but state law limits the "CIP shift" from residential and open space to commercial, industrial, and personal property owned by businesses. This depends on a complicated formula, and as of 2025 the maximum allowed CIP shift varies up to 175% by dollar amount depending on the municipality, with many at 150%. 43 cities and 65 towns adopted a CIP shift in FY2021. Another complicated formula sets a minimum residential factor, often 50% or 65%, which constrains the rate differential between residential and CIP, even if the dollar amount for CIP is low due to a small commercial tax base. Watertown hit its minimum in 2022, prompting the city to file a home rule petition asking for a reduction to 50%. In increase in working from home after the COVID-19 pandemic caused a devaluation of office buildings in Boston, prompting the city to ask in 2024 and 2025 for a temporary increase in CIP shift to 200%.

A residential exemption up to 35% is allowed for primary residence (adopted by 15 municipalities in FY2021, shifting taxes to second homes and rentals) in addition to a long list of types of property excluded from taxation (including federal and educational buildings). Municipalities may also give up to a 10% discount for small businesses (14 municipalities in FY2021, shifting taxes to industrial properties) and a discount of at least 25% to open space (1 municipality in FY2021, shifting taxes to residential properties).

== See also ==
- Proposition 13, the California tax limitation law that inspired the passage of Proposition 2½.
- Colorado Taxpayer Bill of Rights
