= Walter H. C. Bromfield =

Australian philatelist (1884–1963)

Walter Henry Cope Bromfield (1884 – 1963) was an Australian philatelist who signed the Roll of Distinguished Philatelists in 1950.
