= Richard Bromfield =

American psychologist

Richard Bromfield is an American psychologist on the faculty of Harvard Medical School who specializes in the therapy and upbringing of children and adolescents. His writings for the popular press have been widely praised for their relevance and accessibility.

== Books ==
- Playing for Real: The World of a Child Therapist (Dutton, 1992) (ISBN 0525934618, ISBN 978-0-525-93461-5) re-issued Basil Books 2007.
- Doing Child and Adolescent Psychotherapy: The Ways and Whys (Jason Aronson, 1999) (ISBN 0765702207, ISBN 978-0-7657-0220-3)
- Handle with Care: Understanding Children and Teachers: a Field Guide for Parents and Educators (Teachers College Press, 2001) (ISBN 0807739952, ISBN 978-0-8077-3995-2)
- How to Turn Boys Into Men Without a Man Around the House: A Single Mother's Guide, with Cheryl Erwin (Prima Pub., 2002) (ISBN 0761536302, ISBN 978-0-7615-3630-7)
- Living with the Boogeyman: Helping Your Child Cope with Fear, Terrorism, and Living in a World of Uncertainty (Prima Pub., 2002) (ISBN 0761527141, ISBN 978-0-7615-2714-5)
- Teens in Therapy: Making it Their Own (W.W. Norton, 2005) (ISBN 0393704645, ISBN 978-0-393-70464-8), W W Norton page
- Doing Child and Adolescent Psychotherapy: Adapting Psychodynamic Treatment to Contemporary Practice (Wiley-Interscience, 2007) (ISBN 0470145854, ISBN 978-0-470-14585-2)
- How to Unspoil Your Child Fast (Basil Books, 2007) (ISBN 097978851X, 9780979788512)
