= St. Joseph Central High School (Pittsfield, Massachusetts) =

Private, coeducational school in Pittsfield, Massachusetts, United States

Saint Joseph Central High School
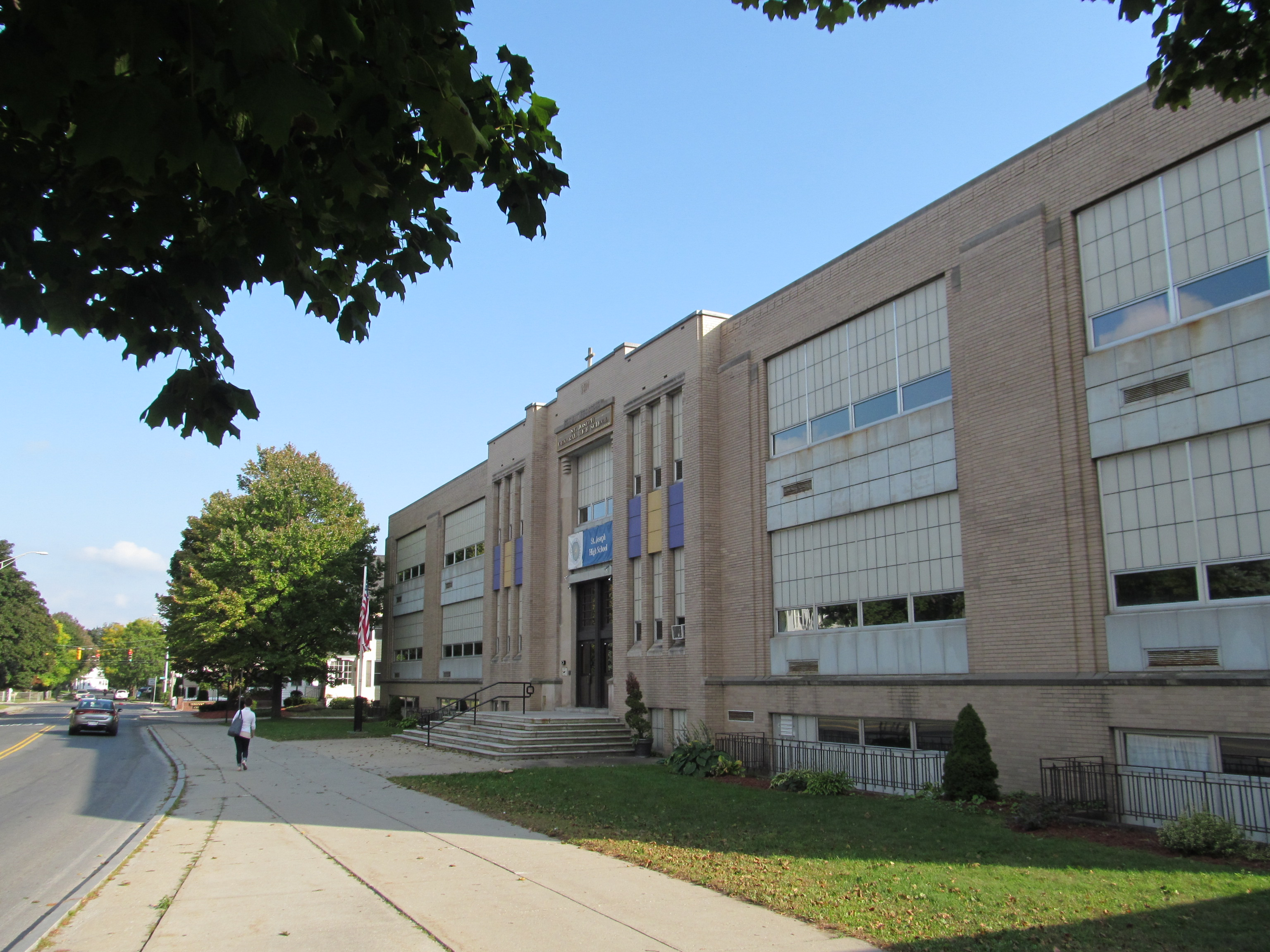
- St. Joseph Central High School

Location
- 22 Maplewood Avenue; Pittsfield, (Berkshire County), Massachusetts 01201; United States; 42°27′17″N 73°15′3″W

Information
- Type: Private, Coeducational
- Religious affiliation: Roman Catholic
- Established: 1897
- Closed: 2017
- School district: Diocese of Springfield
- Grades: 9–12
- Average class size: 15
- Student to teacher ratio: 7:1
- Campus size: small
- Campus type: Urban
- Colors: Purple and Gold
- Athletics conference: Berkshire County League
- Mascot: Crusaders
- Nickname: St. Joe
- Accreditation: New England Association of Schools and Colleges
- Tuition: $6,750 (without parish assistance)
- Affiliation: Diocese of Springfield
- Website: http://www.stjosephpittsfield.org

Saint Joseph Central High School was a private, college preparatory, Roman Catholic high school in Pittsfield, Massachusetts. Saint Joseph offered a co-educational intensive college preparatory curriculum to students in grades 9 through 12. SJCHS had a strong international student community with students from Korea, China, Austria, and Spain, but did not offer boarding facilities. International students live with local host families. Former principal Francis X. Foley announced his resignation in June 2013, and has been replaced with Dr. Amy Gelinas. The School closed in June 2017.

== Background ==
Saint Joseph Central High School was established as Saint Joseph Academy by the Sisters of St. Joseph in 1897 in downtown Pittsfield. It moved to its present location, 22 Maplewood Ave, in 1942.

== Athletics ==
Saint Joseph offered various varsity sports. Boys teams included football, soccer, basketball, baseball, and lacrosse. Girls teams included volleyball, soccer, basketball and softball, Co-ed teams included cross-country (running), alpine skiing, swimming, tennis, track and field, golf, ice hockey, and bowling (club).
