= Littleton High School (Massachusetts) =

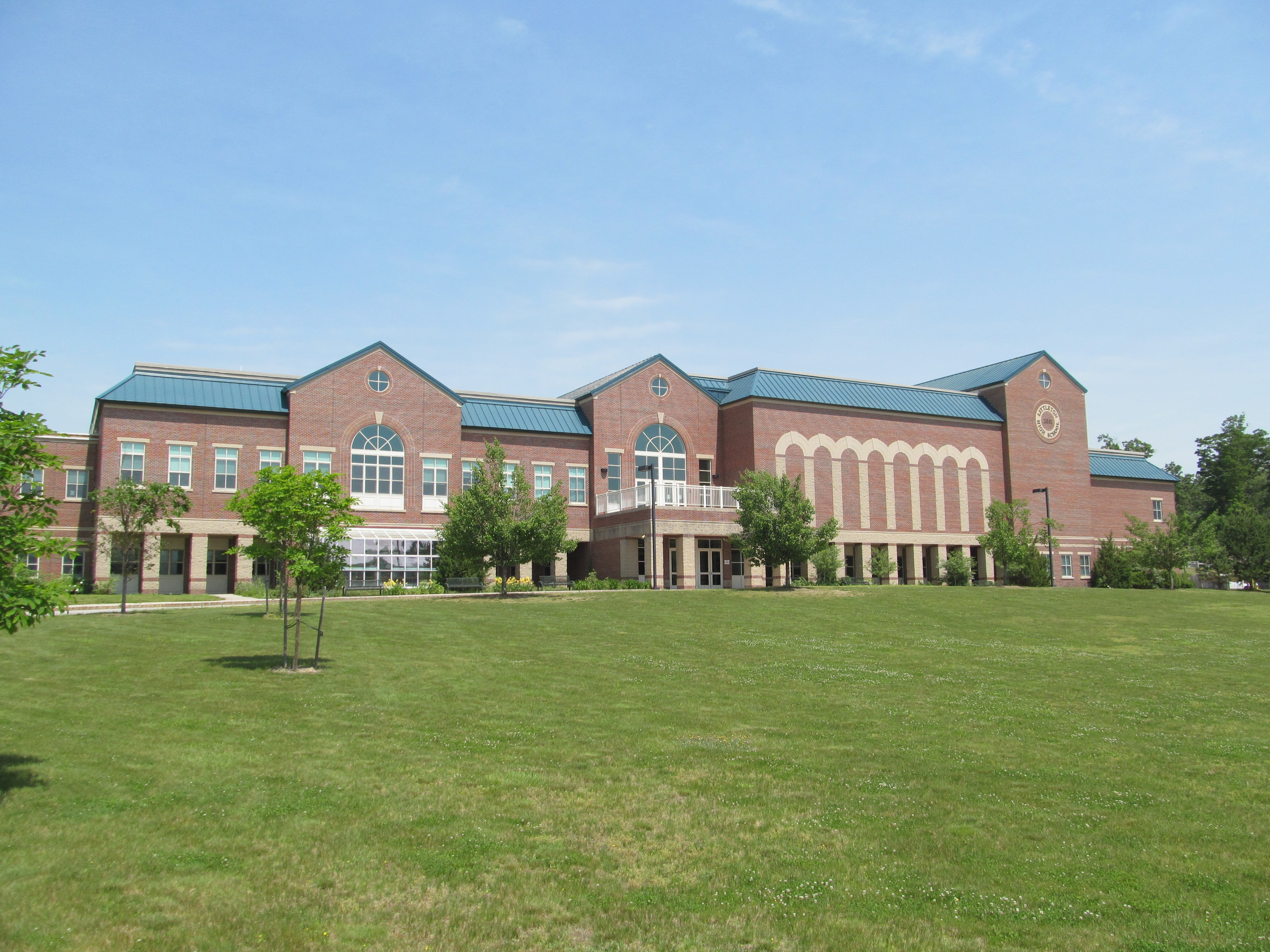

Location
- 56 King Street; Littleton, Massachusetts 01460; United States
- Coordinates: 42°32′28″N 71°30′26″W

Information
- Type: Public; Open enrollment
- Opened: 2002
- Principal: John Harrington
- Staff: 36.27 (FTE)
- Enrollment: 487 (2023-2024)
- Student to teacher ratio: 13.43
- Colors: Blue, Gold
- Athletics conference: Midland Wachusett League
- Nickname: Tigers
- MCAS % proficient and advanced: ELA: 98 Math: 94 Science: 97 (Spring 2011)

Littleton High School is a public high school located at 56 King Street, Littleton, Massachusetts, United States. It serves students in grades 9-12 from the town of Littleton. The building was opened in 2002.

== History ==
From 1924 to 1957, the high school was located at 37 Shattuck Street, in the building that now houses the town offices.

Around November 1955, the new Littleton Junior-Senior High School building on Russell Street began construction. It was designed by The Architects Collaborative. From 1957-1968, and again from 1989-2002, it was operated as a Junior-Senior high school. During this entire time (1957 - 2002) the school was located on Russell Street, next to the Russell Street Elementary School. The building was torn down in 2008.
