= Massachusetts Charter School Athletic Organization =

Interscholastic athletic league

The Massachusetts Charter School Athletic Organization is a league formed to give Charter School student athletes in Massachusetts, USA, the opportunity to compete in interscholastic sports. It was established in 2005.

The mission of the Massachusetts Charter School Athletic Organization (MCSAO) is to oversee "the regulation, organization and promotion of its member schools interscholastic athletic programs. MCSAO provides opportunities for charter school student/athletes to compete at a high level and uses that competition to teach the fundamental values of teamwork, discipline, sacrifice and sportsmanship. This will contribute to the students' overall educational experience and development as individuals. MCSAO is committed to educating our youth for a better tomorrow and will work in partnership with local communities to establish and maintain charter school interscholastic athletic programs."

Current high school members:

- Academy Of The Pacific Rim
- Boston Collegiate Charter School
- Boston Preparatory Charter Public School
- City On A Hill Charter Public Schools
- City On A Hill Charter Public Schools II
- City On A Hill New Bedford
- Codman Academy Charter Public School
- Community Charter School Of Cambridge
- Brooke High School
- Edward M. Kennedy
- Excel Academy High School
- Kipp Academy Lynn
- Match
- Neighborhood House Charter School
- Paulo Freire Social Justice Charter School
- Phoenix Charter Academy
- Phoenix Academy Lawrence
- Phoenix Springfield Charter Academy
- Pioneer Charter School Of Science
- Pioneer Charter School Of Science II
- Prospect Hill Academy Charter School
- Roxbury Preparatory Charter School
- Salem Academy Charter School
- South Shore Charter Public School

Fall	Winter	Spring
Varsity boys' cross country	Varsity boys' basketball	Varsity baseball
Varsity girls' cross country	Varsity girls' basketball	Varsity softball
Varsity boys' soccer	Varsity wrestling	Varsity boys' outdoor track and field
Varsity girls' soccer	Varsity cheerleading	Varsity girls' outdoor track and field
Varsity girls' volleyball	Varsity dance competition	Varsity boys' volleyball
Varsity football	Varsity indoor track and field	Varsity girls' lacrosse
	Varsity swimming and diving	Varsity boys' lacrosse

Current middle school members:

- Academy of the Pacific Rim
- Boston Prep
- Edward Brooke East Boston
- Edward Brooke Mattapan
- Edward Brooke Roslindale
- Community Charter School of Cambridge
- Codman
- Community Day
- Davis Leadership Academy
- Epiphany School
- Excel Academy Chelsea
- Excel Academy East Boston
- Excel Academy Orient Heights
- Foxboro Regional
- KIPP Academy Boston
- KIPP Academy Lynn
- MATCH
- Marblehead Community
- McAuliffe Regional
- Neighborhood House
- New Heights
- Pioneer School of Science I
- Prospect Hill Academy
- Roxbury Prep Dorchester
- Roxbury Prep Lucy Stone
- Roxbury Prep Mission Hill
- Salem Academy
- South Shore
- UP Academy Boston
- UP Academy Dorchester
- Community Day Gateway
- Community Day Webster

Fall	Winter	Spring
Co-ed cross country	Boys' basketball	Girls' track and field
Girls' soccer	Girls basketball	Boys' track and field
Boys' soccer		
