= Bromfield School =

Public high school in the Town of Harvard, Massachusetts

Coordinates: 42°29′54″N 71°35′7″W

The Bromfield School
- The new Bromfield School was built in 1962.
- 14 Massachusetts Avenue; Harvard, Massachusetts

Information
- Type: Public High school Open enrollment
- Established: 1878
- School district: Harvard Public Schools
- Principal: Kim Murphy (9-12); Dan Hudder (6-8)
- Faculty: 57
- Grades: 6–12
- Enrollment: about 750
- Colors: Blue and white
- Athletics conference: Midland Wachusett League
- Mascot: Trojan
- Affiliation: NEASC
- Website: https://bromfield.psharvard.org/

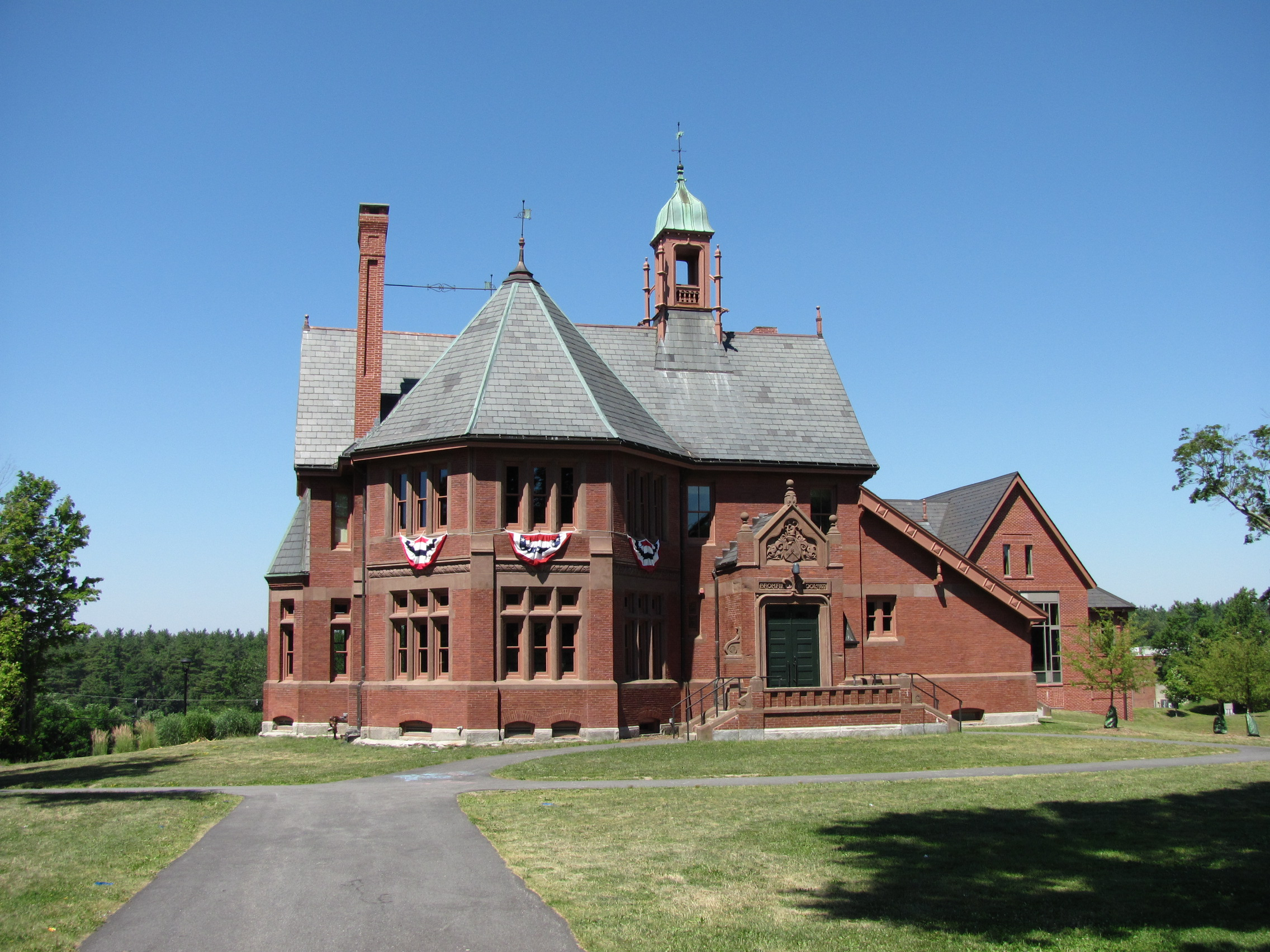
The Old Bromfield School, designed in 1878 by Peabody and Stearns, was recently converted to the Harvard Public Library.

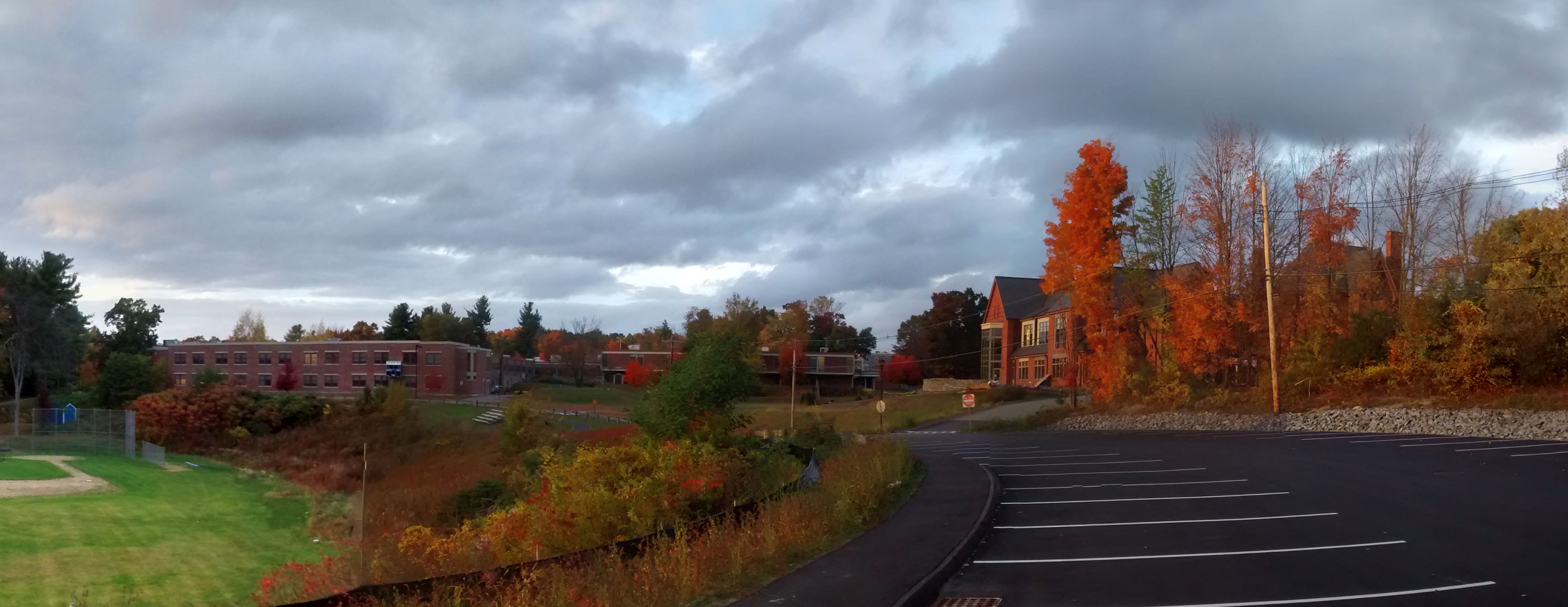
The new Bromfield School, as seen from the rear parking lot, is next to the Old Bromfield School (now the Harvard Public Library) seen on the right.

The Bromfield School is a public school located in Harvard, Massachusetts. Founded in 1878 by Margaret Bromfield Blanchard, the school's student population is approximately 750, in grades 6–12. There are 57 teachers, with a student/faculty ratio of about 1 to 11.

== Academics and extracurriculars ==
=== Academics ===
Bromfield's academic program includes core courses in mathematics, English, social studies, and science, as well as music, world languages, physical education, and the arts. Students in grades 9–12 fulfill graduation requirements in these core courses and may also take advantage of Advanced Placement courses. The school has a 4-year graduation rate of 98%, sending nearly all graduates on to four-year higher-learning institutions. In 2011, U.S. News & World Report ranked Bromfield School as 87th High School in the nation. Most recently, in 2023, U.S. News & World Report High School rankings had it 154th in the nation, and third within Massachusetts.

=== Athletics ===
The Bromfield School also has celebrated athletic teams, especially in soccer and girls cross country/track. The boys varsity soccer team was crowned Division III state champion in 1986, 1987, 1988, 1989, 1996, 2005, 2007, 2008, Division IV State Champion in 2017, 2018, 2019, and 2021, and Division V State Champion in 2022. The Boys team was undefeated in the 1986 and 2008 seasons. The girls varsity soccer team was a Division III state finalist in 2007, while the girls cross country team has been ranked by Nike at one point as the 17th best team in the nation, winning the division II state championship in 2002, 2005, 2006, and 2007. The women's track and field program has had outstanding recognition at the state and national levels, winning the Div. 4 Indoor State Championship in 2001 and each of the last three years along with the All-State Championships in both 2002 and 2003, the girls indoor track team has won the Central Mass all division Championship each of the last four years and has been the All-State runner-up the past two years. The team is known for its distance runners; graduates include Olympian Lynn Jennings, and All-American's Arianna Lambie of Stanford and Emily Jones of Georgetown. The men's track and field program has graduated All-American Nick Steele of Villanova. The Bromfield boys tennis team has had great success in recent years. The team was Division III district champions in 2009, 2022, 2023 and 2024, as well as Division III state finalists in 2010 and 2013.

In the early summer of 2010, Bromfield-Acton-Boxborough Rowing Team qualified a Men's Four and a Women's Double for the Youth National Championships in Batavia, Ohio. The Double placed 6th and the Four placed 13th. In 2013, the Bromfield-Acton-Boxborough Junior Women's 4+ crew won gold at US National rowing competition in Oak Ridge, Tennessee and qualified for the Henley Royal Regatta. In 2019, the Bromfield-Acton-Boxborough Junior Men's 2- placed 5th and the Junior Women's Youth 4+ placed 10th at the USRowing Youth National Championships in Sarasota-Bradenton, Florida.

=== Clubs ===
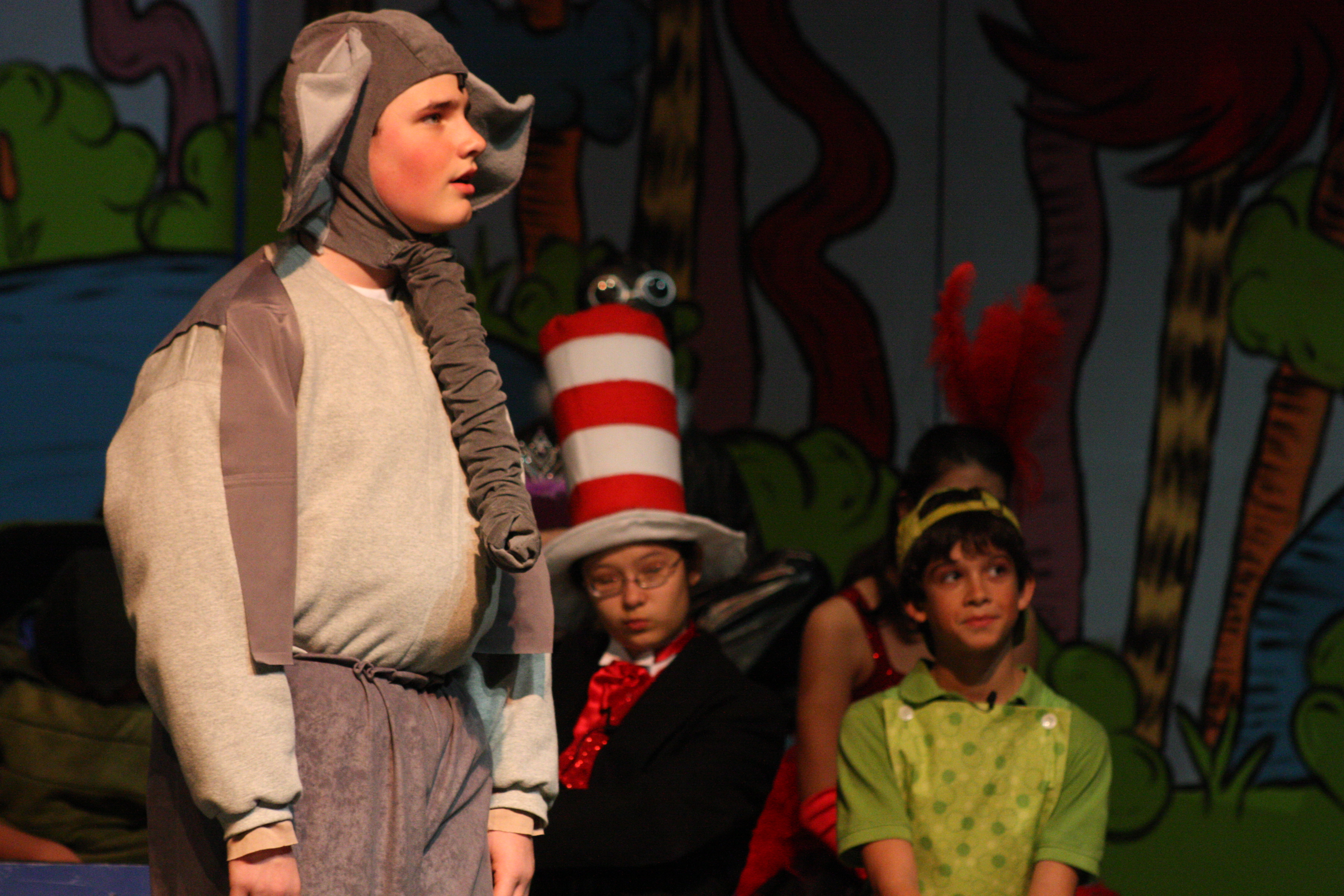
The Bromfield Drama Guild performs the Seussical, December 2010

The Bromfield School has clubs ranging from a Varsity Math Team, which competes in the Worcester County Math League (WOCOMAL), to Bromfield Cares, an organization dedicated to helping the needy and those with cancer or other diseases. Other extra-curricular activities and clubs include the Bromfield Quiz Team, Freshman & Varsity Math Teams, Investment Club, The Gender and Sexuality Alliance, The Asian-American Alliance, Business Professionals of America (BPA) Chapter, a local chapter of the World Computer Exchange, The Green Team, The Bromfield Chess Club, Speech & Debate Club, Book Club, Film Club, History Bowl Team, Bromfield Model United Nations, as well as many more.

The Bromfield Drama Society has also made a name for itself by reaching the state finals of the Massachusetts High School Drama Guild Festival 29 out of the last 34 years. It has not participated in its festival since the 2020 COVID-19 pandemic. Notable alumni include actor Keir O'Donnell, who graduated from Bromfield in 1996.

== History ==
=== Building history ===
The old Bromfield school was built in 1878 by Peabody and Stearns, a well-renowned architecture firm based in Boston. By the early 1960s, the old building was getting too small for the town's rapidly growing population, only being able to accommodate around 100 students schoolwide. In 1962, the current building and gymnasium were constructed to mitigate this issue. In 1989, the school built a new auditorium (named after town moderator John Cronin), a new parking lot behind the old building, band room, and hallway connecting the main building to the gymnasium. A 2003 expansion saw the construction of the south wing of the school, as well as a new library. Classes were held in the old building until this expansion. Shortly after classes stopped being held in the old building, it began to be converted into the town's new library - as the old one was slowly reaching capacity. A large expansion was added to the old school building in 2007 and opened shortly after as the new Harvard Public Library. The 1962 building was partially renovated from 2022 to 2024, involving updates to locker rooms, bathrooms, and flooring. This renovation also included the unpopular decision to paint over a large mural in a stairwell which had been there since 2003.

=== 2016 vandalism incident ===
At the start of every year, the senior class at Bromfield traditionally paints messages on a large rock (dubbed the "Senior Rock" by students) on its campus. In November 2016, during a period of political unrest after that year's presidential election, a group of unnamed perpetrators vandalized the painted rock. According to the superintendent at the time, Linda Dwight: "symbols [on the rock] included multiple swastikas including one covering the Star of David, sexist and homophobic symbols, and racist terms". Shortly afterwards, a group of over 50 townsfolk—organized by Bromfield graduate Emma Franzeim—gathered to cover up the graffiti with white paint and inclusive messages.

== Notable alumni ==
- Keir O'Donnell (class of 1996), actor
- Lynn Jennings, long-distance runner, Olympian
- Simon Henshaw (class of 1978), former U.S. Ambassador to Guinea
