= List of high schools in Massachusetts =

This is a list of high schools in the state of Massachusetts.

== Barnstable County ==
- Cape Cod Academy, Osterville
- Dennis-Yarmouth Regional High School, South Yarmouth
- Mashpee Middle-High School, Mashpee
- Nauset Regional High School, Eastham
- Sandwich High School, East Sandwich
- Trinity Christian Academy of Cape Cod, Barnstable

=== Bourne ===
- Bourne High School
- Upper Cape Cod Regional Technical School

=== Falmouth ===
- Falmouth Academy
- Falmouth High School

=== Hyannis ===
- Barnstable High School
- St. John Paul II High School
- Sturgis Charter Public School

=== Harwich ===
- Cape Cod Regional Technical High School
- Monomoy Regional High School

== Berkshire County ==
- Berkshire Arts & Technology Charter Public School, Adams
- Hoosac Valley High School, Cheshire
- Lee Middle and High school, Lee
- Lenox Memorial High School, Lenox
- Monument Mountain Regional High School, Great Barrington
- Wahconah Regional High School, Dalton

=== North Adams ===
- Charles H. McCann Technical High School
- Drury High School

=== Pittsfield ===
- Miss Hall's School
- Pittsfield High School
- Taconic High School

=== Sheffield ===
- Berkshire School
- Mount Everett Regional School

=== Williamstown ===
- Buxton School
- Mount Greylock Regional High School

== Bristol County ==
- Bishop Stang High School, North Dartmouth
- Dartmouth High School, Dartmouth
- Fairhaven High School, Fairhaven
- Joseph Case High School, Swansea
- North Attleborough High School, North Attleborough
- Norton High School, Norton
- Seekonk High School, Seekonk
- Somerset Berkley Regional High School, Somerset
- Westport High School, Westport

=== Attleboro ===
- Attleboro Community Academy
- Attleboro High School
- Bishop Feehan High School

=== Dighton ===
- Bristol County Agricultural High School
- Dighton-Rehoboth Regional High School

=== Easton ===
- Oliver Ames High School
- Southeastern Regional Vocational Technical High School

=== Fall River ===
- B.M.C. Durfee High School
- Diman Regional Vocational Technical High School

=== Mansfield ===
- Al Noor Academy
- Mansfield High School

=== New Bedford ===
- Greater New Bedford Regional Vocational-Technical High School
- New Bedford High School

=== Taunton ===
- Bristol-Plymouth Regional Technical School
- Taunton High School

== Dukes County ==
- Martha's Vineyard Regional High School, Oak Bluffs

== Essex County ==
- Georgetown Middle/High School, Georgetown
- Gloucester High School, Gloucester
- Ipswich High School, Ipswich
- Lynnfield High School, Lynnfield
- Manchester Essex Regional High School, Manchester-by-the-Sea
- Marblehead High School, Marblehead
- Masconomet Regional High School, Boxford
- Newburyport High School, Newburyport
- Pentucket Regional High School, West Newbury
- Rockport High School, Rockport
- Salem High School, Salem
- Saugus High School, Saugus
- Swampscott High School, Swampscott

=== Amesbury ===
- Amesbury High School
- Amesbury Innovation High School
- Heritage Academy of Amesbury

=== Andover ===
- Andover High School
- Greater Lawrence Technical School
- Phillips Academy

=== Beverly ===
- Beverly High School
- Northshore Academy
- The Waring School

=== Danvers ===
- Danvers High School
- Essex North Shore Agricultural and Technical High School
- St. John's Preparatory School

=== Hamilton ===
- Hamilton-Wenham Regional High School
- Pingree School

=== Haverhill ===
- Haverhill High School
- Whittier Regional Vocational Technical High School

=== Lawrence ===
- Central Catholic High School
- Lawrence High School

=== Lynn ===
- Lynn Classical High School
- Lynn English High School
- Lynn Vocational and Technical Institute
- St. Mary's High School

=== Methuen ===
- Methuen High School
- Notre Dame Cristo Rey High School

=== Newbury ===
- The Governor's Academy
- Triton Regional High School

=== North Andover ===
- Brooks School
- North Andover High School

=== Peabody ===
- Bishop Fenwick High School
- Peabody Veterans Memorial High School

== Franklin County ==
- Academy at Charlemont, Charlemont
- Mohawk Trail Regional High School, Buckland
- Ralph C. Mahar Regional High School, Orange
- Turners Falls High School, Montague

=== Deerfield ===
- Deerfield Academy
- Frontier Regional High School

=== Greenfield ===
- Greenfield High School
- Stoneleigh-Burnham School

=== Northfield ===
- Northfield Mount Hermon School
- Pioneer Valley Regional School

== Hampden County ==
- Agawam High School, Agawam
- East Longmeadow High School, East Longmeadow
- Holyoke High School Holyoke
- Longmeadow High School, Longmeadow
- Ludlow High School, Ludlow
- Monson High School, Monson
- Palmer High School, Palmer
- Saint Mary High School, Westfield
- Southwick-Tolland Regional High School, Southwick
- West Springfield High School, West Springfield

=== Chicopee ===
- Chicopee Comprehensive High School
- Chicopee High School

=== Springfield ===
- Pope Francis Preparatory School
- Pioneer Valley Christian School
- Roger L Putnam Vocational-Technical High School
- Springfield Central High School
- Springfield High School of Science and Technology

=== Westfield ===
- Westfield High School
- Westfield Vocational Technical High School

=== Wilbraham ===
- Minnechaug Regional High School
- Wilbraham & Monson Academy

== Hampshire County ==
- Amherst Regional High School, Amherst
- Belchertown High School, Belchertown
- Gateway Regional High School, Huntington
- Hampshire Regional High School, Westhampton
- Hopkins Academy, Hadley
- MacDuffie School, Granby
- Smith Academy, Hatfield
- Ware Junior Senior High School, Ware

=== Easthampton ===
- Easthampton High School
- Williston Northampton School

=== Northampton ===
- Northampton High School
- Smith Vocational and Agricultural High School

=== South Hadley ===
- Pioneer Valley Performing Arts Charter Public School
- South Hadley High School

== Middlesex County ==
=== Eastern Middlesex County (Boston Metro Area) ===
- Burlington High School, Burlington
- Everett High School, Everett
- Melrose High School, Melrose
- North Reading High School, North Reading
- Stoneham High School, Stoneham
- Watertown High School, Watertown
- Wilmington High School, Wilmington
- Winchester High School, Winchester
- Woburn Memorial High School, Woburn

==== Arlington ====
- Arlington Catholic High School
- Arlington High School

==== Belmont ====
- The Arlington School
- Belmont High School
- Belmont Hill School

==== Cambridge ====
- Buckingham Browne & Nichols
- Cambridge Rindge and Latin School
- Community Charter School of Cambridge
- Cristo Rey Boston High School
- International School of Boston

==== Lexington ====
- Lexington Christian Academy
- Lexington High School
- Minuteman Regional High School

==== Malden ====
- Malden Catholic High School
- Malden High School

==== Medford ====
- Medford High School
- Saint Clement High School

==== Newton ====
- Newton Country Day School
- Newton North High School
- Newton South High School

==== Reading ====
- Austin Preparatory School
- Reading Memorial High School

==== Somerville ====
- Prospect Hill Academy
- Somerville High School

==== Wakefield ====
- Northeast Metro Tech
- Wakefield Memorial High School

==== Waltham ====
- Chapel Hill – Chauncy Hall School
- Gann Academy
- Waltham High School

=== Northern Middlesex County ===
- Ayer Shirley Regional High School, Ayer
- Chelmsford High School, Chelmsford
- Dracut High School, Dracut
- Francis W. Parker Charter Essential School, Devens
- Littleton High School, Littleton
- Maynard High School, Maynard
- North Middlesex Regional High School, Townsend
- Tewksbury Memorial High School, Tewksbury

==== Billerica ====
- Billerica Memorial High School
- Shawsheen Valley Technical High School

==== Groton ====
- Groton School
- Groton-Dunstable Regional High School
- Lawrence Academy at Groton

==== Lowell ====
- Lowell Catholic High School
- Lowell High School

==== Tyngsborough ====
- Academy of Notre Dame
- Greater Lowell Technical High School
- Innovation Academy Charter School
- Tyngsborough High School

==== Westford ====
- Nashoba Valley Technical High School
- Westford Academy

=== Southern Middlesex County ===
- Ashland High School, Ashland
- Holliston High School, Holliston
- Hopkinton High School, Hopkinton

==== Framingham ====
- Framingham High School
- The Learning Center for the Deaf
- Sudbury Valley School

==== Natick ====
- Natick High School
- Walnut Hill School

=== Western Middlesex County ===
- Acton-Boxborough Regional High School, Acton
- Bedford High School, Bedford
- The Carroll School, Lincoln
- Hudson High School, Hudson
- Lincoln-Sudbury Regional High School, Sudbury
- Wayland High School, Wayland

==== Concord ====
- Concord Academy
- Concord-Carlisle High School
- Middlesex School

==== Marlborough ====
- Advanced Math and Science Academy Charter School
- Assabet Valley Regional Technical High School
- Marlborough High School

==== Weston ====
- The Cambridge School of Weston
- Gifford School
- The Rivers School
- Weston High School

== Nantucket County ==
- Nantucket High School, Nantucket

== Norfolk County ==
- Bellingham High School, Bellingham
- Cohasset High School, Cohasset
- Dover-Sherborn High School, Dover
- Foxborough High School, Foxborough
- King Philip Regional High School, Wrentham
- Medfield High School, Medfield
- Medway High School, Medway
- Millis High School, Millis
- Norwood High School, Norwood
- Sharon High School, Sharon
- Stoughton High School, Stoughton
- Weymouth High School, Weymouth

=== Braintree ===
- Archbishop Williams High School
- Braintree High School

=== Brookline ===
- Brookline High School
- Dexter Southfield School
- Maimonides School

=== Canton ===
- Blue Hills Regional Technical School
- Canton High School

=== Dedham ===
- Dedham High School
- Noble and Greenough School
- Ursuline Academy

=== Franklin ===
- Franklin High School
- Tri-County Regional Vocational Technical High School

=== Holbrook ===
- Holbrook Middle-High School

=== Milton ===
- Fontbonne Academy
- Milton Academy
- Milton High School

=== Needham ===
- Needham High School
- Saint Sebastian's School

=== Quincy ===
- North Quincy High School
- Quincy High School

=== Randolph ===
- The Learning Center for the Deaf
- Randolph High School

=== Walpole ===
- Norfolk County Agricultural High School
- Walpole High School

=== Wellesley ===
- Dana Hall School
- Wellesley High School

=== Westwood ===
- Westwood High School
- Xaverian Brothers High School

== Plymouth County ==
- Abington High School, Abington
- Apponequet Regional High School, Lakeville
- Bridgewater-Raynham Regional High School, Bridgewater
- Carver Middle High School, Carver
- Duxbury High School, Duxbury
- East Bridgewater High School, East Bridgewater
- Hull High School, Hull
- Marshfield High School, Marshfield
- Middleborough High School, Middleborough
- Norwell High School, Norwell
- Old Colony Regional Vocational Technical High School, Rochester
- Old Rochester Regional High School, Mattapoisett
- Pembroke High School, Pembroke
- Rockland Senior High School, Rockland
- Scituate High School, Scituate
- Silver Lake Regional High School, Kingston
- Tabor Academy, Marion
- Wareham High School, Wareham
- West Bridgewater Middle-Senior High School, West Bridgewater
- Whitman-Hanson Regional High School, Whitman

=== Brockton ===
- Brockton High School
- Cardinal Spellman High School

=== Hanover ===
- Hanover High School
- South Shore Vocational Technical High School

=== Hingham ===
- Hingham High School
- Notre Dame Academy

=== Plymouth ===
- Plymouth North High School
- Plymouth South High School

== Suffolk County ==
=== Public/Magnet Schools ===
- Boston Arts Academy
- Boston Community Leadership Academy
- Boston Latin Academy, Roxbury
- Boston Latin School
- Charlestown High School, Charlestown
- Chelsea High School, Chelsea
- East Boston High School
- Horace Mann School for the Deaf and Hard of Hearing, Allston
- English High School of Boston
- John D. O'Bryant School of Mathematics & Science, Roxbury
- Madison Park Technical Vocational High School, Roxbury
- Revere High School, Revere
- Snowden International School, Boston
- TechBoston Academy, Brighton
- Winthrop High School, Winthrop

=== Charter Schools ===
- Academy of the Pacific Rim Charter Public School, Hyde Park
- Edward M. Kennedy Academy for Health Careers

=== Private Schools ===
- Boston College High School, Dorchester
- Boston University Academy
- British School of Boston
- Cathedral High School
- Catholic Memorial High School, West Roxbury
- Commonwealth School
- Mount Saint Joseph Academy, Brighton
- The Newman School
- Roxbury Latin School, West Roxbury

== Worcester County ==
=== Northeastern Worcester County ===
- The Bromfield School, Harvard
- Tahanto Regional High School, Boylston
- Clinton High School, Clinton
- Leominster High School Leominster
- Lunenburg High School, Lunenburg
- Nashoba Regional High School, Bolton
- West Boylston Middle/High School, West Boylston

==== Fitchburg ====
- Fitchburg High School
- Montachusett Regional Vocational Technical School
- Notre Dame Preparatory School
- Sizer School
- St. Bernard's Central Catholic High School

==== Lancaster ====
- South Lancaster Academy
- Trivium School

=== Northwestern Worcester County ===
- Athol High School, Athol
- Eagle Hill School, Hardwick
- Gardner High School, Gardner
- Narragansett Regional High School, Templeton
- Wachusett Regional High School, Holden

==== Ashburnham ====
- Cushing Academy
- Oakmont Regional High School

==== Barre ====
- Quabbin Regional High School
- Stetson School

==== Winchendon ====
- Murdock Middle/High School
- The Winchendon School

=== Southwestern Worcester County ===
- Auburn High School, Auburn
- Bartlett High School, Webster
- Bay Path Regional Vocational Technical High School, Charlton
- David Prouty High School, Spencer
- Leicester High School, Leicester
- North Brookfield High School, North Brookfield
- Oxford High School, Oxford
- Quaboag Regional Middle High School, Warren
- Shepherd Hill Regional High School, Dudley
- Southbridge High School, Southbridge
- Tantasqua Regional High School Sturbridge

=== Southeastern Worcester County ===
- Algonquin Regional High School, Northborough
- Blackstone-Millville Regional High School, Blackstone
- Douglas High School, Douglas
- Grafton High School, Grafton
- Hopedale Junior Senior High School, Hopedale
- Milford High School, Milford
- Millbury Junior/Senior High School, Millbury
- St. Mark's School, Southborough
- Sutton High School, Sutton
- Uxbridge High School, Uxbridge
- Westborough High School, Westborough

==== Northbridge ====
- Northbridge High School
- Whitinsville Christian School

==== Shrewsbury ====
- Shrewsbury High School
- St. John's High School

==== Upton ====
- Blackstone Valley Regional Vocational Technical High School
- Nipmuc Regional High School

=== Worcester ===
- Abby Kelley Foster Charter Public School
- Bancroft School
- Burncoat High School
- Doherty Memorial High School
- Massachusetts Academy of Math and Science at WPI
- North High School
- Notre Dame Academy
- St. Paul Diocesan Junior-Senior High School
- South High Community School
- University Park Campus School
- Worcester Academy
- Worcester Technical High School

== See also ==
- Massachusetts Board of Education
- Massachusetts Department of Elementary and Secondary Education
