= List of Massachusetts state high school football champions =

Below is a list of Massachusetts state and regional high school football champions sanctioned by the Massachusetts Interscholastic Athletic Association since the organization began holding state championship games in 1972. From 1972 to 2012, only regional champions were crowned. Starting in 2013, a new format was implemented to crown a true state champion in six statewide divisions. The number of divisions expanded to eight in 2016, which has remained in place since.

== Regional Champions ==
=== Eastern Massachusetts Champions ===
Year	Division 1		Division 2			Division 3		Division 4		Division 5				
1972	Brockton		Swampscott											
1973	Brockton (2)		Catholic Memorial			North Attleborough		Hanover						
1974	Natick		Andover			North Attleborough (2)		Hanover (2)						
1975	Woburn		Andover (2)			Newburyport		Hanover (3)						
1976	Walpole		Lynn Classical			Newburyport (2)		Hanover (4)						
1977	Norwood		Boston College High			Ipswich		Hull						
1978	Medford		Catholic Memorial (2)			Concord-Carlisle		Middleborough						
1979	Woburn (2)		Lynn Classical (2)			Canton		Middleborough (2)						
1980	Norwood (2)		Taunton			Silver Lake Regional		Millis		Nantucket				
1981	Walpole (2)		Winthrop			Canton (2)		Holliston		Manchester				
1982	Natick (2)		St. John's Prep			Franklin		Dom Savio		Manchester (2)				
1983	Natick (3)		Winthrop (2)			Dartmouth		Middleborough (3)		West Roxbury				
1984	Brockton (3)		Plymouth-Carver Regional			Dartmouth (2)		Westwood		St. Clement				
1985	Brockton (4)		Tewksbury			Lincoln-Sudbury		Holliston (2)		Norton				
1986	Winchester		Xaverian Brothers			Lincoln-Sudbury (2)		Archbishop Williams		Greater Lowell				
1987	Brockton (5)		Chelmsford			Foxborough		Norwell		West Roxbury (2)				
1988	Brockton (6)		Dracut			Foxborough (2)		Westwood (2)		West Roxbury (3)				
1989	Walpole (3)		Plymouth (2)			Lincoln-Sudbury (3)		Whitman-Hanson		Dorchester				
1990	Peabody		Winchester (2)			Case		East Bridgewater		Greater Lowell (2)				
Year	Division 1A	Division 1B	Division 2A		Division 2B	Division 3A	Division 3B	Division 4A	Division 4B	Division 5A	Division 5B	Division 6A	Division 6B	
1991	Brockton (7)	Waltham	Chelmsford (2)		Walpole (4)	Gloucester	Foxborough (3)	Fairhaven	Ipswich (2)	Greater Lowell (3)	Martha's Vineyard Regional	Weston	West Bridgewater	
1992	Brockton (8)	North Quincy	Methuen		Wellesley	Rockland	Mansfield	Cardinal Spellman	Ipswich (3)	Greater Lowell (4)	Martha's Vineyard Regional (2)	Westwood (3)	Marian	
1993	New Bedford	Peabody (2)	Billerica		Wellesley (2)	North Attleborough (3)	Westford (3)	Old Rochester Regional	Arlington Catholic	West Roxbury (4)	Boston English	Bellingham	Hopkinton	
1994	New Bedford (2)	Xaverian Brothers (2)	Chelmsford (3)		Acton-Boxborough	Whitman-Hanson (2)	Mansfield (2)	North Andover	Fairhaven (2)	East Boston	Tyngsborough	Westwood (4)	Millis (2)	
1995	Barnstable	Xaverian Brothers (3)	Reading		Walpole (5)	Gloucester (2)	Marshfield	Wareham	Newburyport (3)	West Roxbury (5)	Nantucket (2)	Chelsea	Ashland	
1996	Brockton (9)	Xaverian Brothers (4)	Reading (2)		Tewksbury (2)	Marshfield (2)	Mansfield (3)	Dighton-Rehoboth	Hull (2)	Greater Lowell (5)	Nantucket (3)	Westwood (5)	Weston (2)	
1997	St. John's Prep (2)	Everett	Walpole (6)		Central Catholic	Bishop Feehan	North Attleborough (4)	Newburyport (4)	Norwell (2)	Boston English (2)	Martha's Vineyard Regional (3)	St. Bernard's	North Shore Tech	
Year	Division 1A	Division 1B	Division 2A	Division 2B	Division 2C	Division 3A	Division 3B	Division 4A	Division 4B	Division 5A	Division 5B	Division 6A	Division 6B	
1998	Xaverian Brothers (5)	Bridgewater-Raynham	Reading (3)	Marshfield (3)	Central Catholic (2)	North Attleborough (5)	Rockland (2)	Dighton-Rehoboth (2)	Norwell (3)	Bellingham (2)	Greater Lawrence	Weston (3)	Pope John Paul II	
1999	Everett (2)	Barnstable (2)	Billerica (2)	Wakefield	Wellesley (3)	North Attleborough (6)	Salem	Pentucket Regional	Bishop Fenwick	Martha's Vineyard Regional (4)	Millis (3)	Manchester / Rockport (3)	Austin Prep	
2000	Boston College High (2)	Bridgewater-Raynham (2)	Framingham	Norwood (3)	Reading (4)	Gloucester (3)	Rockland (3)	Bishop Fenwick (2)	Fairhaven (3)	Bellingham (3)	Greater Lowell (6)	Georgetown	Savio Prep (2)	
Year	Division 1		Division 2			Division 3		Division 4		Division 5		Division 6		Division 7
2001	Everett (3)		Acton-Boxborough (2)			Whitman-Hanson (3)		Bishop Feehan (2)		Bellingham (4)		Marian (2)		Charlestown
2002	Everett (4)		Acton-Boxborough (3)			North Attleborough (7)		Bishop Feehan (3)		Abington		Marian (3)		South Shore
2003	Everett (5)		Acton-Boxborough (4)			Mansfield (4)		Bishop Feehan (4)		Westwood (6)		Martha's Vineyard Regional (5)		South Shore (2)
Year	Division 1		Division 1A			Division 2		Division 2A		Division 3		Division 3A		Division 4
2004	Brockton (10)		Acton-Boxborough (5)			Mansfield (5)		Bishop Feehan (5)		Westwood (7)		East Boston (2)		Southeastern
2005	Brockton (11)		Woburn (3)			Natick (4)		Duxbury		Abington (2)		St. Mary's		Southeastern (2)
2006	Everett (6)		Wayland			Foxborough (4)		Winthrop (3)		Medfield		Ipswich (4)		West Bridgewater (2)
2007	Everett (7)		Chelmsford (4)			Bishop Feehan (6)		Gloucester (4)		Swampscott (2)		Greater Lawrence (2)		Brighton
2008	Boston College High (3)		Dracut (2)			Walpole (7)		Duxbury (2)		Arlington Catholic (2)		Amesbury		Manchester Essex (4)
Year	Division 1	Division 1A	Division 2		Division 2A	Division 3	Division 3A	Division 4	Division 4A	Division 5				
2009	Xaverian Brothers (6)	Gloucester (5)	Reading (5)		Marshfield (4)	Bishop Feehan (7)	Austin Prep (2)	Whittier	Northeast Metro Tech					
2010	Everett (8)	Gloucester (6)	Mansfield (6)		Duxbury (3)	Beverly	Holliston (3)	Shawsheen Valley	Northeast Metro Tech (2)					
2011	Boston College High (4)	Everett (9)	Duxbury (4)		Dennis-Yarmouth Regional	Concord-Carlisle (2)	Bourne	Mashpee	Blue Hills	Nantucket (4)				
2012	St. John's Prep (3)	Everett (10)	Reading (6)		Beverly (2)	Sharon	Bishop Feehan (8)	Abington (3)	Boston Cathedral	Upper Cape Tech				

=== Central/Western Massachusetts Champions ===
Year	Division 1			Division 2			Division 3						
1972	Fitchburg			East Longmeadow									
1973	Leominster			Algonquin Regional			Oakmont Regional						
1974	Leominster (2)			Taconic			Northbridge						
1975	Chicopee			Milford			Amherst Regional						
1976	Westfield			East Longmeadow (2)			Mahar Regional						
1977	St. John's			Minnechaug Regional			Oakmont Regional (2)						
Year	Division 1 Central		Division 1 West	Division 2 Central		Division 2 West	Division 3 West						
1978	Leominster (3)		Minnechaug Regional (2)	Oakmont Regional (3)		Athol							
1979	Marlborough		Holyoke	Lunenburg		Hoosac Valley							
1980	Doherty Memorial		Westfield (2)	Ayer		[Hoosac Valley High School | [Hoosac Valley] (2)]							
1981	Leominster (4)		Westfield (3)	Lunenburg (2)		Ware							
1982	Leominster (5)		Holyoke (2)	Ayer (2)		Drury							
1983	Milford (2)		Minnechaug Regional (3)	Lunenburg (3)		Wahconah Regional	Assabet Valley Regional						
1984	Westborough		Minnechaug Regional (4)	Oakmont Regional (4)		Athol (2)	Grafton						
1985	St. John's (2)		Longmeadow	Westford		Palmer	Grafton (2)						
1986	Milford (3)		Northampton	Westford (2)		Palmer (2)	Grafton (3)						
1987	Milford (4)		Westfield (4)	Worcester South		Hoosac Valley (3)	Northbridge (2)						
1988	St. John's (3)		Springfield Cathedral	Worcester South (2)		Drury (2)	West Boylston						
1989	Leominster (6)		Springfield Cathedral (2)	North Middlesex Regional		Hoosac Valley (4)	Northbridge (3)						
1990	Leominster (7)		Holyoke (3)	North Middlesex Regional (2)		Monument Mountain Regional	Narragansett Regional						
1991	Fitchburg (2)		Springfield Central	Hudson		St. Joseph's	Uxbridge						
1992	North Middlesex Regional (3)		Longmeadow (2)	St. Peter-Marian		Hoosac Valley (5)	Uxbridge (2)						
1993	North Middlesex Regional (4)		Springfield Central (2)	St. Peter-Marian (2)		Lee	Millbury						
1994	North Middlesex Regional (5)		Springfield Central (3)	St. Peter-Marian (3)		Lee (2)	Clinton						
1995	North Middlesex Regional (6)		Holyoke (4)	St. Peter-Marian (4)		St. Joseph's (2)	Clinton (2)						
1996	Fitchburg (3)		Springfield Central (4)	St. Peter-Marian (5)		Monument Mountain Regional (2)	Narragansett Regional (2)						
Year	Division 1		Division 1A	Division 2		Division 2A	Division 3		Division 3A				
1997	Springfield Central (5)		Leominster (8)	Longmeadow (3)		Gardner	Northbridge (4)		Oxford				
1998	Springfield Cathedral (3)		Leominster (9)	Longmeadow (4)		Wahconah Regional (2)	Northbridge (5)		Lunenburg (4)				
1999	Nashoba Regional		Longmeadow (5)	Amherst Regional (2)		Mt. Greylock	Clinton (3)		Commerce				
2000	Fitchburg (4)		Shrewsbury	Mt. Greylock (2)		Leicester	Clinton (4)		Bay Path				
2001	St. John's (4)		Springfield Central (6)	Northbridge (6)		Commerce (2)	Clinton (5)		Bay Path (2)				
2002	Leominster (10)		Longmeadow (6)	Northbridge (7)		Commerce (3)	Clinton (6)		Worcester North				
2003	Longmeadow (7)		Wachusett Regional	Wahconah Regional (3)		Millbury (2)	Mahar Regional (2)		Belchertown				
2004	St. John's (5)		Wachusett Regional (2)	Burncoat		Leicester (2)	Mahar Regional (3)		Worcester North (2)				
Year	Division 1	Division 1AA	Division 1A	Division 2		Division 2A	Division 3		Division 3A				
2005	Longmeadow (8)	St. John's (6)	South Hadley	Holy Name		Auburn	Narragansett Regional (3)		Easthampton				
2006	Longmeadow (9)	St. John's (7)	Milford (5)	Holy Name (2)		Chicopee Comp	Oakmont Regional (5)		Worcester South (3)				
Year	Division 1		Division 1A	Division 2		Division 2A	Division 3		Division 3A				
2007	Longmeadow (10)		Shrewsbury (2)	Shepherd Hill Regional		Northbridge (8)	Putnam		Blackstone Valley				
2008	Longmeadow (11)		Holy Name (3)	Tantasqua Regional		Auburn (2)	Putnam (2)		Assabet Valley Regional (2)				
Year	Division 1 Central	Division 1 West	Division 1A Central	Division 2 Central	Division 2 West	Division 2A Central	Division 3 Central	Division 3 West	Division 3A Central	Division 4 West			
2009	Wachusett Regional (3)	West Springfield	St. John's (8)	David Prouty	Hoosac Valley (6)	Auburn (3)	Oakmont Regional (6)	Mahar Regional (4)	Clinton (7)	Ware (2)			
2010	St. John's (9)	Wachusett Regional (4)	Northbridge (9)	Auburn (4)	Narragansett Regional (4)	Clinton (8)	Longmeadow (12)	South Hadley (2)	Mt. Greylock (3)	Easthampton (2)			
Year	Division 1 Central		Division 1 West	Division 2 Central		Division 2 West	Division 3 Central		Division 3 West	Division 4 Central	Division 4 West	Division 5 Central	Division 6 Central
2011	Leominster (11)		Longmeadow (13)	Nashoba Regional (2)		Putnam (3)	Auburn (5)		Mt. Greylock (4)	Northbridge (10)	Pioneer Valley	Leicester (3)	Bay Path (3)
2012	Leominster (12)		Springfield Central (7)	Nashoba Regional (3)		Wahconah Regional (4)	Auburn (6)		Mt. Greylock (5)	Grafton (4)	Pathfinder	West Boylston (2)	Blackstone Valley (2)

== State Champions ==
Year	Division 1	Division 2	Division 3	Division 4	Division 5			
2013	Central Catholic (3)	Mansfield (7)	Tewksbury (3)	Doherty Memorial (2)	Bishop Fenwick (3)			
2014	Xaverian Brothers (7)	Marshfield (5)	Dartmouth (3)	Holliston (4)	Abington (4)			
2015	Xaverian Brothers (8)	Nashoba Regional (4)	Dartmouth (4)	Holliston (5)	Northbridge (11)			
Year	Division 1	Division 1A	Division 2	Division 2A	Division 3	Division 3A	Division 4	Division 4A
2016	Everett (11)	King Philip Regional	Duxbury (5)	Falmouth	Hanover (5)	East Bridgewater (2)	Mashpee (3)	Millis-Hopedale (4)
Year	Division 1	Division 2	Division 3	Division 4	Division 5	Division 6	Division 7	Division 8
2017	Everett (12)	King Philip Regional (2)	St. John's (10)	Melrose	Dennis-Yarmouth Regional (2)	Middleborough (4)	Mashpee (4)	Millis (5)
2018	St. John's Prep (4)	North Andover (2)	Springfield Central (8)	Nashoba Regional (5)	Scituate	Stoneham	Blackstone Valley (3)	St. Bernard's (2)
2019	St. John's Prep (5)	Mansfield (8)	Springfield Central (9)	Melrose (2)	Swampscott (3)	Ashland (2)	Abington (5)	St. Bernard's (3)
2020	No state tournament due to the COVID-19 pandemic							
2021	Springfield Central (10)	Catholic Memorial (3)	Marblehead	Scituate (2)	Swampscott (4)	Rockland (4)	Cohasset (2)	Randolph
2022	St. Johns Prep (6)	Catholic Memorial (4)	Wakefield (2)	Duxbury (6)	North Reading	St. Mary's (2)	West Boylston (3)	Hull (3)
2023	Xaverian Brothers (9)	King Philip Regional (3)	Milton	Duxbury (7)	Foxborough (5)	Fairhaven (4)	Uxbridge (3)	West Boylston (4)
2024	Xaverian Brothers (10)	Catholic Memorial (5)	North Attleborough (8)	Scituate (3)	Shawsheen Valley (2)	Hudson (2)	Uxbridge (4)	West Boylston (5)
2025	Xaverian Brothers (11)	Catholic Memorial (6)	King Philip Regional (4)	Scituate (4)	Shawsheen Valley (3)	Fairhaven (5)	Cohasset (3)	Randolph (2)

== Most Championships ==
Rank	School	Number	Years
1	Longmeadow	13	1985, 1992, 1997, 1998, 1999, 2002, 2003, 2005, 2006, 2007, 2008, 2010, 2011
2	Leominster	12	1973, 1974, 1978, 1981, 1982, 1989, 1990, 1997, 1998, 2002, 2011, 2012
3	Everett	12	1997, 1999, 2001, 2002, 2003, 2006, 2007, 2010, 2011, 2012, 2016, 2017
4	Brockton	11	1972, 1973, 1984, 1985, 1987, 1988, 1991, 1992, 1996, 2004, 2005
5	Northbridge	11	1974, 1987, 1989, 1997, 1998, 2001, 2002, 2007, 2010, 2011, 2015
6	Xaverian Brothers	11	1986, 1994, 1995, 1996, 1998, 2009, 2014, 2015, 2023, 2024, 2025
8	St. John's	10	1977, 1985, 1988, 2001, 2004, 2005, 2006, 2009, 2010, 2017
8	Springfield Central	10	1991, 1993, 1994, 1996, 1997, 2001, 2012, 2018, 2019, 2021
9	Clinton	8	1994, 1995, 1999, 2000, 2001, 2002, 2009, 2010
10	Bishop Feehan	8	1997, 2001, 2002, 2003, 2004, 2007, 2009, 2012
11	Mansfield	8	1992, 1994, 1996, 2003, 2004, 2010, 2013, 2019
12	North Attleborough	8	1973, 1974, 1993, 1997, 1998, 1999, 2002, 2024

== Vocational Champions ==
In addition, the Massachusetts Vocational Athletic Directors Association (MVADA) holds a tournament for vocational schools that do not qualify for the MIAA tournament or who are eliminated in the first round of the MIAA Playoffs. However, these championships are not recognized by the MIAA. The vocational champions are listed below:

Year	Large		Small
2004	Bay Path		South Shore
2005	Whittier		Dean Tech
2006	Shawsheen		Assabet Valley
2007	Shawsheen (2)		South Shore (2)
2008	Bay Path (2)		South Shore (3)
2009	Lynn Tech		Blackstone Valley
2010	Greater New Bedford		North Shore Tech
2011	Greater New Bedford (2)		Lynn Tech (2)
2012	Greater New Bedford (3)		Blue Hills
2013	Blackstone Valley		Blue Hills (2)
2014	Whittier (2)		Essex Tech
2015	Monty Tech		Essex Tech (2)
2016	Northeast Metro		Upper Cape
2017	Assabet		Lynn Tech (3)
2018	Greater Lawrence		Nashoba Valley Tech
2019	Greater Lawrence (2)		South Shore (4)
2020	No vocational tournament due to the COVID-19 pandemic		
2021	Northeast Metro (2)		Blue Hills (3)
2022	Bay Path (3)		South Shore (5)
2023	Bay Path (4)		Blue Hills (4)
2024	Bay Path (5)		Tri-County
Year	Large	Middle	Small
2025	Diman Tech	Tri-County (2)	Cape Cod Tech

=== Most Vocational Champions ===
Rank	School	Number	Years
1	Bay Path	5	2004, 2008, 2022, 2023, 2024
2	South Shore	5	2004, 2007, 2008, 2019, 2022
3	Blue Hills	4	2012, 2013, 2021, 2023
4	Lynn Tech	3	2009, 2011, 2017
5	Greater New Bedford	3	2010, 2011, 2012
6	Essex Tech	2	2014, 2015
7	Shawsheen	2	2006, 2007
8	Whittier Tech	2	2005, 2014
9	Northeast Metro	2	2016, 2021
10	Tri-County	2	2024, 2025

== See also ==
- List of Massachusetts state high school baseball champions
- List of Massachusetts state high school field hockey champions
