= Commonwealth Athletic Conference =

The Commonwealth Athletic Conference (CAC) is a high school athletic conference in District 5 of the Massachusetts Interscholastic Athletic Association (MIAA).

== Sports ==
The following sports are supported by the Commonwealth Athletic Conference.

Fall	Winter	Spring
Cross Country	Basketball	Baseball
Field Hockey	Girls Gymnastics	Lacrosse
Boys Golf	Ice Hockey	Softball
Soccer	Indoor Track	Tennis
Girls Swimming	Boys Swimming	Outdoor Track
Girls Volleyball	Wrestling	

== Member schools ==
=== Current members ===
The following thirteen schools are a member of the Commonwealth Athletic Conference.

School	Location	Colors	Type	Mascot
Academy of Notre Dame	Tyngsborough, Massachusetts	Navy blue & Goldenrod	Private K-12	Lancers
Greater Lawrence Technical School	Andover, Massachusetts	Black & Orange	Public Secondary	Reggies
Greater Lowell Technical High School	Tyngsborough, Massachusetts	Navy Blue & Gold	Public Secondary	Gryphons
Innovation Academy Charter School	Tyngsborough, Massachusetts	Red, White, and Blue	Public Secondary	Hawks
KIPP Academy Lynn Collegiate High School	Lynn, Massachusetts	Blue & Black	Charter 9-12	Panthers
Lowell Catholic High School	Lowell, Massachusetts	Navy Blue and Green	Public K-12	Crusaders
Lynn Vocational and Technical Institute	Lynn, Massachusetts	Navy Blue & Red	Public Secondary	Tigers
Minuteman Career and Technical High School	Lexington, Massachusetts	Navy Blue & Gold	Public Secondary	Revolution
Mystic Valley Regional Charter School	Malden, Massachusetts	Maroon & Gold	Public K-12	Eagles
Nashoba Valley Technical High School	Westford, Massachusetts	Navy Blue & Blue	Public Secondary	Vikings
Northeast Metropolitan Regional Vocational High School	Wakefield, Massachusetts	Black & Gold	Public Secondary	Golden Knights
Shawsheen Valley Technical High School	Billerica, Massachusetts	Purple, Black & White	Public Secondary	Rams
Whittier Regional Vocational Technical High School	Haverhill, Massachusetts	Maroon & Gold	Public Secondary	Wildcats

=== Former members ===
School	Location	Type	Left	Mascot
Chelsea High School	Chelsea, Massachusetts	public secondary		Red Devils
Essex Agricultural High School	Danvers, Massachusetts	public secondary	2014	Rams
Essex North Shore Agricultural and Technical School	Hathorne, Massachusetts	public secondary	2014	Hawks
Fellowship Christian Academy	Methuen, Massachusetts	private secondary		
North Shore Technical High School	Middleton, Massachusetts	public secondary	2014	Bulldogs
Pope John XXIII High School	Everett, Massachusetts	private catholic secondary		Tigers
Presentation of Mary Academy	Methuen, Massachusetts	private secondary	2020	Panthers
St. Mary's High School	Lynn, Massachusetts	private catholic secondary		Spartans
Tyngsborough High School	Tyngsborough, Massachusetts	public secondary		Tigers
