= Minuteman Career and Technical High School =

Minuteman Regional Vocational Technical High School
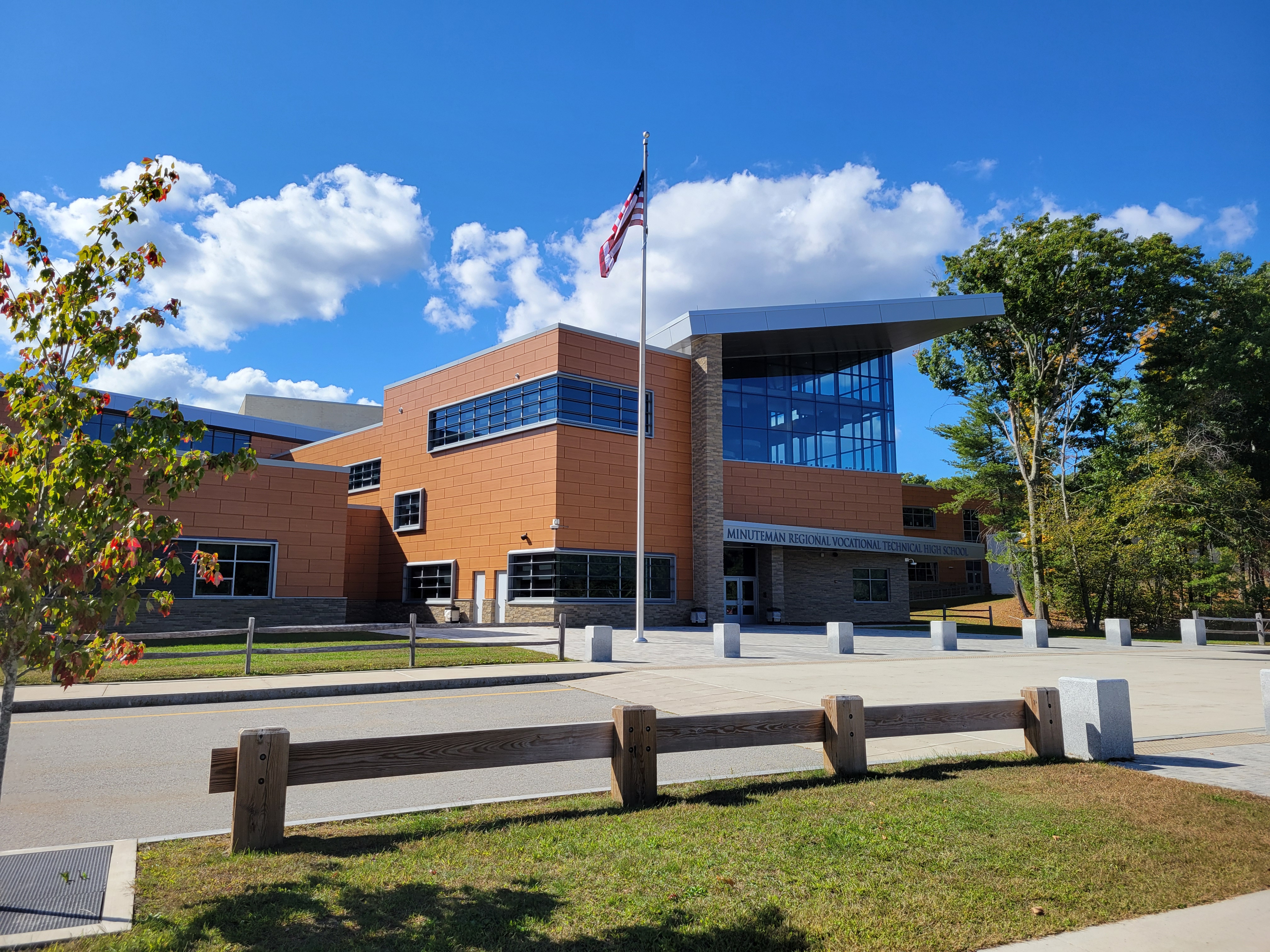
- Minuteman Regional Vocational Technical High School

Location
- 758 Marrett Road; Lexington, Massachusetts 02421; United States
- Coordinates: 42°26′45.32″N 71°16′08.50″W

Information
- Type: Public High School
- Established: 1971
- School district: Minuteman Regional School District
- Superintendent: Heidi Driscoll
- Principal: Paul D'Alleva
- Staff: 82.37 (FTE)
- Grades: 9-12
- Enrollment: 683 (2023-2024)
- Student to teacher ratio: 8.29
- Campus: Suburban
- Colors: Navy, gold, and white
- Athletics conference: Commonwealth Athletic Conference
- Budget: $20.1 million (FY21)
- Communities served: Acton, Arlington, Bolton, Concord, Dover, Lancaster, Lexington, Needham, Stow
- Website: Minuteman Regional High School

Minuteman Regional Vocational Technical High School is a Public Vocational High School (grades 9-12) located in Lexington, Massachusetts, United States. The school serves the towns of Acton, Arlington, Bolton, Concord, Dover, Lancaster, Lexington, Needham, and Stow. Minuteman is a member of the Commonwealth Athletic Conference for sports, which competes at the Division 5 level of athletics in Massachusetts. The school's mascot is the Revolution, and the school's colors are navy blue, gold, and white. Minuteman was recognized as a National Blue Ribbon School by the Department of Education in 2018. Minuteman was recognized as a National Green Ribbon School by Department of Education in 2024.

== Curriculum and programs offered ==
Minuteman combines academics and college preparation (the main purpose of traditional high schools) with carefully designed courses related to career exploration and learning (the main purpose of vocational-technical schools). The original school planners focused on needs of students living along Massachusetts' high-tech corridor. Other area schools, under state regulations, are not allowed to operate the Chapter 74 technical programs available at Minuteman.

Minuteman currently offers 19 different vocational & technical shop concentrations for the students. The programs Minuteman offers are listed below.

- Animal Science
- Bio-Technology
- Horticulture
- Environmental Technology
- Health Occupations
- Graphic Design
- Programming and Web Design
- Robotics
- Engineering
- Cosmetology
- Culinary Arts
- Early Education
- Automotive
- Carpentry
- Electrical
- Plumbing
- Welding & Metal Fabrication
- Advanced Manufacturing
- Multimedia Engineering

== Campus ==
Minuteman has a 65-acre campus that sits just west of Route 128, at the intersection of Massachusetts Avenue and Marrett Road (Route 2A) in Lexington, Massachusetts.

== Athletics ==
Minuteman currently offers 14 different sports that students can participate in at the school. Minuteman is a member of the Commonwealth Athletic Conference for sports, and the school mascot is the Revolution, and the schools colors are Navy Blue, Gold, and White. Minuteman's athletic teams compete at the Division 4 & 5 level in Massachusetts. A list of the sports offered at Minuteman are listed below.

- Fall Sports
  - Football
  - Boys' Soccer
  - Girls' Soccer
  - Cross Country
  - Cheerleading
  - Golf
- Winter Sports
  - Boys' Basketball
  - Girls' Basketball
  - Ice Hockey
  - Swimming
- Spring Sports
  - Baseball
  - Softball
  - Lacrosse
  - Tennis

== See also ==
- List of high schools in Massachusetts
- Vocational school
