= Presentation of Mary Academy =

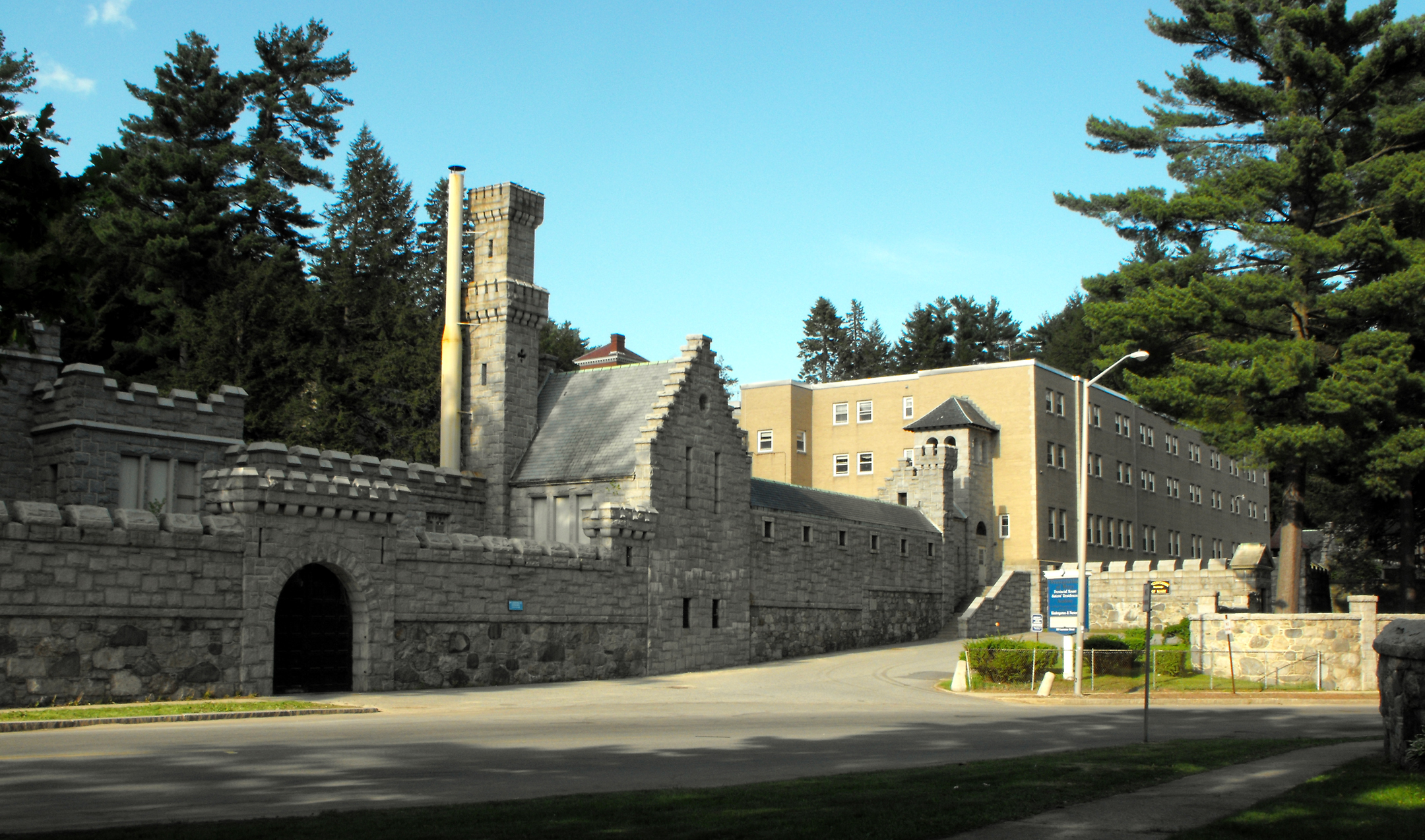

Location
- 209 Lawrence Street; Methuen, Essex County, Massachusetts 01844; United States; 42°43′38″N 71°10′51″W

Information
- Type: Private, Co-Ed
- Religious affiliation: Roman Catholic
- Established: 1958
- Founder: Sisters of the Presentation of Mary
- Closed: 2020
- Head of school: Rose Maria Redman
- Grades: 9–12
- Enrollment: 210
- Colors: Blue and White
- Slogan: Discover You.
- Athletics conference: Commonwealth Athletic Conference
- Mascot: PMA Panther
- Team name: Panthers
- Accreditation: New England Association of Schools and Colleges
- Newspaper: The Panther Post
- Admissions Director: Jane Danahy Foss
- Athletic Director: James Weymouth
- Website: http://www.pmamethuen.org

Presentation of Mary Academy, commonly abbreviated PMA was a private Roman Catholic co-ed high school, grades 9–12 in Methuen, Massachusetts. It was located in the Roman Catholic Archdiocese of Boston. PMA's student body hailed from 31 local cities and towns, represented 3 New England states, and 4 countries.

== History ==
The school was founded in 1958. The academy, located at 209 Lawrence St, is situated on a 22-acre campus formerly known as the Edward F. Searles Estate. In 2008, the school celebrated its 50th anniversary. In October 2016, the estate was opened up for public tours. There are other related schools in the region also operated by the Sisters of the Presentation, including the same-named Presentation of Mary Academy grammar school in Hudson, New Hampshire (which continues to operate).

=== October 2017 threat scare ===
On the afternoon of October 4, 2017, threatening messages were discovered written on a school wall by a student after school hours. This prompted a massive police response and a 1-hour delay of classes the following day, October 5. Additionally, all students arriving to school on October 5 were required to walk through a metal detector and to have their bags scanned by a computerized program. Police presence remained active throughout the school day on October 5 and many extra safety measures were taken. By the afternoon of October 5, the Methuen Police Chief as well as the Head of School had announced that there was no longer any imminent threat and that school would proceed as normal the following day.

In the late evening hours of October 5, police reported that a student had confessed to writing the threatening messages on the school wall. Police also confirmed the following day, October 6, that a juvenile felony charge would be filed against the student in question, who was not identified by authorities.

=== 2020 closure ===
In October 2019, Presentation of Mary Academy announced that the school would close at the end of the 2020 school year. Financial concerns were the primary cause for this decision – enrollment at the school had significantly declined over the past several years and the number of students attending while unable to afford full tuition was increasing. As a private school that did not receive any state or federal tax dollars, all revenue was financed through donations, fundraisers, tuition, and the Sisters of the Presentation. In September, it had announced that the Sisters would leave the property, further adding to the financial stress of the school.

The final classes were conducted online beginning in March 2020 due to the coronavirus pandemic. The final graduating class graduated via a “rolling rally” under pandemic restrictions across the campus on May 30, 2020.
