= Wang Institute of Graduate Studies =

Software engineering school in Tyngsborough, Massachusetts

Coordinates: 42°39′31.4″N 071°24′27.2″W

The Wang Institute of Graduate Studies was an independent educational institution founded in 1979 by computer entrepreneur An Wang. Its purpose was to provide professional and continuing studies in the nascent field of software engineering. It was accredited by the New England Association of Schools and Colleges in 1983. Faculty members were recruited from industry and students were required to have a minimum of three years prior experience in industry as a condition of acceptance.

The Institute acquired its 200-acre (0.81 km^{2}) campus from the Marist Brothers who had operated a seminary on the site since 1924. Located in Tyngsborough, Massachusetts, it housed two divisions: The School of Information Technology and a fellowship program in East Asian studies.

The Institute never grew beyond a dozen or so faculty. As a result of declining business fortunes Dr. Wang closed the Institute, graduating the last class on August 27, 1988. The campus was transferred to Boston University where it served as a corporate education center. Today, it is the location of the Innovation Academy Charter School.

== Software engineering curriculum ==
The Institute graduated seven classes between 1982 and 1988 in its Master of Software Engineering program, requiring study in eleven three-credit courses. Two project courses involved students in team-based analysis, specification, design, implementation, testing, and integration of software products.

The original six core courses were:

Course	Topics
Computing systems architecture	Logical design of computing systems; Interaction of major system components; Software levels: microcode to operating system; Architectural features pertinent to specific design goals; Current issues and trends
Applications of formal methods	Abstraction techniques; Analytical models of software; Operational and definitional specifications; Verification techniques; State-oriented and applicative models of computation
Management concepts	Structure of organizations; Planning and finance; Software contracts; Business psychology; Group motivation and leadership styles; Business tools
Project management	Tools and techniques for planning, organizing, staffing, directing, and controlling software projects; Managerial structures, policies, and procedures; Quantitative tools for project scheduling, cost estimation, and software metrics; Work breakdown structures, milestones, and reporting mechanisms; Social and psychological aspects of project management; Structure of programming teams
Programming methodology	Fundamental principles of design, implementation, testing, and maintenance of software products; Automated tools and analytic techniques for software development and maintenance; Software design methodologies; Testing techniques; Maintenance considerations
Software engineering	Planning and defining a software product; Software lifecycle models; Documentation and validation of project phases; Languages and automated tools for Software requirements specification; Software product acquisition; Reuseability of software; Project notebooks and program support libraries; Configuration management

The curriculum was later modified to include an optional operating systems course instead of the architecture course.

Elective courses covered a wide spectrum of computer science and management topics, including: compiler construction, database management systems, decision support systems, expert system technology, principles of computer networks, programming environments, requirements analysis, software marketing, technical communication, transaction processing systems, user interface design, and validation and verification.
