= Academy of Notre Dame =

Catholic preparatory school

- Logo of The Academy of Notre Dame

Location
- 180 Middlesex Road; Tyngsboro, Middlesex County, Massachusetts 01879; United States
- Coordinates: 42°40′12″N 71°25′37″W

Information
- Type: Private, Coeducational (Pre-K–12)
- Motto: Ad Altiora (Toward Higher Things)
- Religious affiliations: Roman Catholic, Sisters of Notre Dame de Namur
- Established: 1854
- Staff: 14
- Faculty: 74
- Grades: Pre-K–12
- Student to teacher ratio: 8:1 (9–12)
- Campus size: 250 acres (1.0 km^{2})
- Colors: Navy blue and Goldenrod
- Athletics conference: Massachusetts Interscholastic Athletic Association, Commonwealth Athletic Conference, Merrimack Valley Conference; Ecumenical Athletic Association (Grades 5-8)
- Mascot: Lancer
- Team name: Lancers
- Accreditation: New England Association of Schools and Colleges
- Tuition: $15,190 (9–12), $7,450 (K2–8), $7,875 (Pre-K thru K1 – 5day), $5,500 (PreK – 3 day)
- Lower School Athletic Director: Nate Froment
- Upper School Athletic Director: Lisa Zappala
- Website: http://www.ndatyngsboro.org

The Academy of Notre Dame is a private, Catholic co-educational Pre-K through Grade 12 lower school and college preparatory upper school sponsored by the Sisters of Notre Dame de Namur.

== Background Of NOTRE DAME ACADEMY ==
The Academy of Notre Dame was established in 1854 by the Sisters of Notre Dame de Namur in Lowell, Massachusetts. The boarding school outgrew that location and moved to Tyngsboro, on land formerly belonging to actress Nance O'Neil, in 1927. The school phased out boarding in the 1960s.

== Student life ==
The Academy of Notre Dame is co-educational for students in grades pre-kindergarten through high school.

Sitting on over 250 acres, the Academy has miles of walking trails, several ponds, an athletic facility, and the only Geodome classroom in the area.

In addition to core curriculum, lower and middle students are offered immersion world languages, music lessons, a theater program, school activities and childcare for late pickup.

The high school offers 12 Advanced Placement courses and a rigorous honors and college preparatory curriculum. A dedicated college and career counselor works with every student which ensures 100% college acceptance along with above average college merit based scholarships awarded annually. In high school, students are given the opportunity to be involved in extra-curricular activities. The school offers programs including Campus Ministry, Student Leadership (Class Officers and Student Council), Academy Playmakers, Model UN, Biobuilders, MUSE Arts Magazine, Yearbook, Glee Club, NDAmbassadors, Campus Ministry, 5 Honor Societies, 20+ clubs and activities, 12+ sports in Upper School, and many more.

The entire school celebrates Mission Week and International Day. Upper and Middle schools have Spirit Week in celebration of all NDA clubs and athletics.There are occasional dress down days where students can support missions run by the Sisters of Notre Dame, help raise money for Breast Cancer Awareness, help a family in need, bring in food, blanket and toy donations.
