= Abington High School =

Coordinates: 42.1187116°N 70.9439332°W

- 201 Gliniewicz Way., Abington, MA 02351; United States

Information
- Type: Public; Open enrollment
- Established: 1906
- School district: Abington Public Schools (Massachusetts)
- NCES School ID: 250165000001
- Principal: Jonathan Bourn
- Staff: 47.99 (FTE)
- Grades: 9–12
- Enrollment: 561 (2023–2024)
- Student to teacher ratio: 11.69
- Campus: Suburban
- Colors: Green & White
- Mascot: Green Wave
- Rivals: Whitman-Hanson, Rockland High School
- Newspaper: The Green Wave Gazette
- Website: www.abingtonps.org/o/ahs

Abington High School is a public high school co-located with middle and pre-kindergarten schools in Abington, Massachusetts, United States. It is located at 201 Gliniewicz Way and has 561 students enrolled as of 2023-2024. The school's mascot is the Green Wave and the school colors are Green and White. Abington High School's Football team has won 5 state titles and 8 league championships since 2002. Shawn Donovan holds the school record for most dropped passes in a season at 34. The current building opened in 2017.

== Athletics ==
=== Football ===
The football team has won 5 State Championships (2002, 2005, 2012, 2014, 2019). They have also won 11 South Shore League Championships in 1975, 1981, 2002, 2005, 2006, 2007, 2008, 2009, 2012, and 2013, 2019. They have also had three undefeated teams in 2006, 2008, and 2012.

Abington set a Southeastern Massachusetts record for football attendance on November 14, 2008, in game against rival Mashpee High School. Both teams entered the game undefeated at 9–0 and ranked in the state Top 25 polls, as the South Shore League title and a playoff berth were on the line. Abington prevailed 14–6 and went on to complete an undefeated regular season. The attendance of the game was recorded at 7,109.

Football Accomplishments

- State Champions - 2002, 2005, 2012, 2014, 2019
- State Finalists - 2021
- League Champions - 1975, 1981, 2002, 2005, 2006, 2007, 2008, 2009, 2012, 2013, 2019
- Eastern Mass South Sectional Champions - 2013, 2014, 2019

=== Other sports ===
Abington's baseball team won the Division 3 State Championship in 2009.

The girls' basketball team won the Division 2 State Championship in 1981.

== Music ==
Abington High School offers a variety of music programs for students interested in performance and ensemble work.

=== Abington “Champions” Marching Band ===
This ensemble performs at football games, town events, and competitions across New England. In 2022, the Marching Band formally adopted the “Champions” name and returned to competitive marching, participating in USBands events. The band is open to all students in grades 7–12 who reside in Abington, including eligible students attending South Shore Technical.

Championship Appearances

Year	Competition	Location	Class	Placement	Reference
2024	Massachusetts / Rhode Island State Championships	Stoughton, MA	Regional A - Group I	1st, 89.4	
2025	Massachusetts / Rhode Island State Championships	Stoughton, MA	Regional A - Group I	1st, 90.5	
2026	New England States Championships	Stoughton, MA	Regional A - Group I	1st, 89.5	

The band also participated in the New England States Championship as Performance Class in 2022 and 2023. In 2025, they performed in the America's Hometown Thanksgiving Celebration in Plymouth, Massachusetts.

=== Concert Band & Concert Choir ===
Daily classes that explore music from different cultures and genres, including Broadway, jazz, and contemporary hits. Students in Concert Band or Concert Choir are encouraged to participate in the Marching Band for a more comprehensive musical experience.

=== Jazz Band ===
An after-school ensemble that rehearses once weekly, focusing on jazz, rock, and hip hop. The program emphasizes improvisation and collaborative musicianship, expanding students’ technical and creative skills.

== Notable alumni ==
- Gary Lee Sampson, carjacker and serial killer
- Mike Hazen (born 1976), Boston Red Sox GM, Arizona Diamondbacks executive VP and GM
