= Lowell Catholic =

Private, coeducational school in Lowell, Massachusetts, United States

Lowell Catholic High School
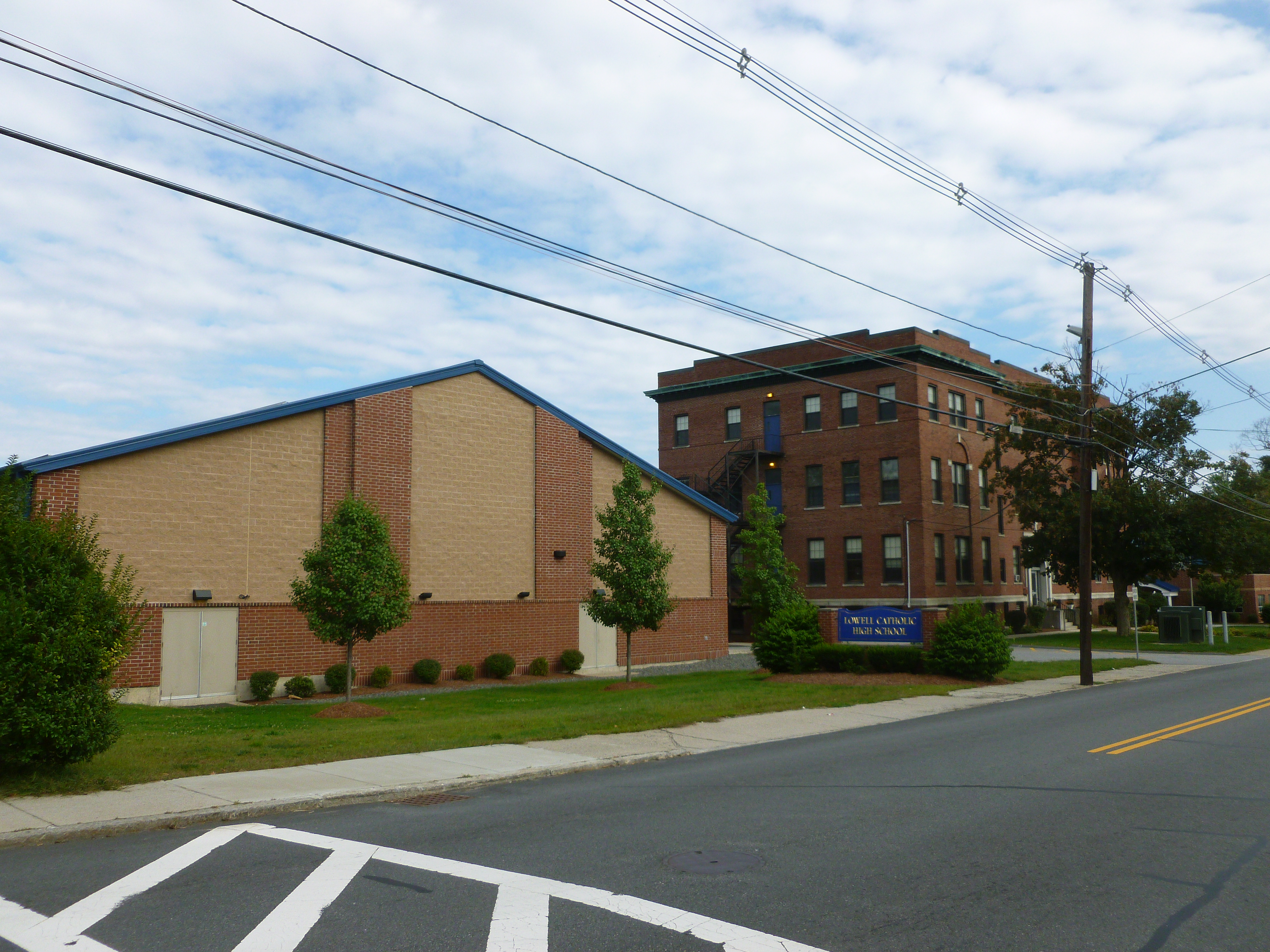
- Campus viewed from north

Location
- 530 Stevens Street; Lowell, (Middlesex County), Massachusetts 01851; United States; 42°37′32″N 71°19′52″W

Information
- Type: Private, Coeducational
- Motto: Excel. Prepare. Live.
- Religious affiliations: Roman Catholic, Xaverian Brothers
- Established: 1989
- Principal: Brittany Conley
- Teaching staff: 38
- Grades: Pre-K–12
- Average class size: 18
- Student to teacher ratio: 10:1
- Colors: Green, navy, and white
- Athletics conference: Commonwealth Athletic Conference
- Team name: Crusaders
- Accreditation: New England Association of Schools and Colleges
- Publication: A New Crusade (literary magazine)
- Newspaper: Rewind
- Yearbook: The Legacy
- Tuition: 2025-26: $14,600
- Director of Enrollment: Hailey Cockroft
- Athletic Director: Matt Stone
- Website: Official website

Lowell Catholic is a private, not-for-profit, college preparatory school in Lowell, Massachusetts. It is located in the Roman Catholic Archdiocese of Boston and is a Xaverian Brothers Sponsored School.

Lowell Catholic High School was established in 1989 through the merger of the following other Catholic high schools:

- Keith Hall/Keith Catholic
- Keith Academy (photo)
- St. Patrick's High School
- St. Joseph's High School
- St. Louis Academy

It enrolls boys and girls in grades Preschool through 12. The school's philosophy embraces the teachings and principles of the Roman Catholic Church and the Xaverian Brothers Sponsored Schools.

== Athletics ==
Lowell Catholic High School's Athletic teams, the Lowell Catholic Crusaders, participate in the following athletics:

Fall Sports

- Cross Country (Boys' and Girls')
- Football
- Golf
- Soccer (Boys' and Girls')
- Volleyball (Girls')
- Cheerleading (Fall and Winter)

Winter Sports

- Basketball (Boys' and Girls')
- Ice Hockey
- Track

Spring Sports

- Baseball
- Girls' Lacrosse
- Boys' Lacrosse
- Softball
- Tennis (Boys' and Girls')
- Volleyball (Boys')

== Notable alumni ==
- Shelagh Donohoe, Olympic rower
- Tami Gouveia, State Representative
- Corey Lewandowski, Political operative and former campaign manager for President Donald Trump
- Matt Mira, Podcast host and comedian
- Robert Keating O'Neill, Librarian at Burns Library at Boston College (1987 – 2013)
