= Belchertown High School =

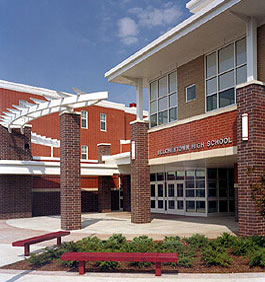
- Front entry of Belchertown High School, c. 2003

Location
- 142 Springfield Road; Belchertown, Massachusetts 01007; United States; 42.2641°N 72.4029°W

Information
- School type: Public high school
- Principal: Christine Vigneux
- Teaching staff: 49.35 (FTE)
- Enrollment: 602 (2023-2024)
- Student to teacher ratio: 12.20
- Campus type: Suburban
- Colors: Black and orange
- Athletics conference: MIAA Division II; PVIAC
- Mascot: Boris the Oriole
- Team name: Orioles
- Website: www.belchertownps.org/belchertown-high-school

Belchertown High School is public high school located in Belchertown, Massachusetts, United States. The school is home to grades 9 through 12. The current building opened in September 2002.

== Music ==
In 2012, the school's marching band, the Marching Orioles, performed in the Main Street Electrical Parade at Disney World's Magic Kingdom in Orlando, Florida. On the same trip, the Belchertown High School Wind Ensemble, Symphony Band, and Concert Band competed in the Orlando World Strides Heritage Festival and received numerous awards.

== Gallery ==
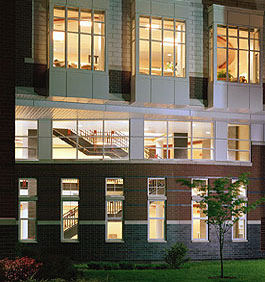
Monumental staircase

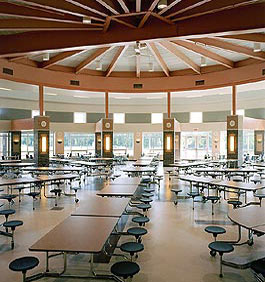
Cafeteria

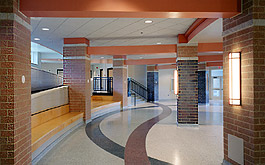
Cafeteria/auditorium lobby

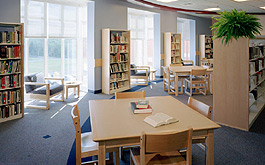
Library

== See also ==
- List of high schools in Massachusetts
