= Shawsheen Valley Technical High School =

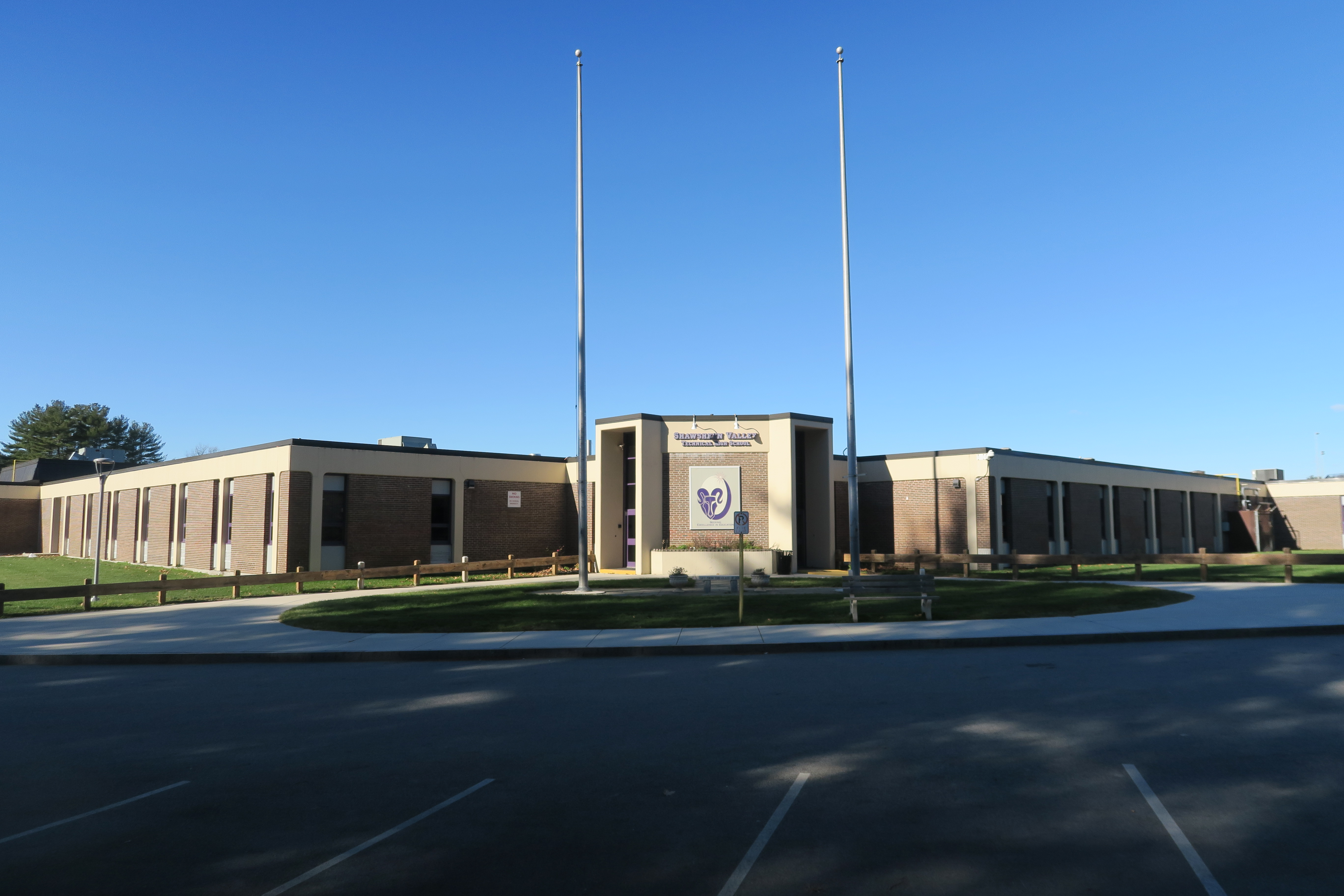
- Shawsheen Valley Technical High School

Location
- 100 Cook Street; Billerica, MA 01821; United States
- Coordinates: 42°32′52″N 71°13′6″W

Information
- Type: Public Vocational High School
- Motto: Dedicated to excellence in education.
- Established: 1965
- Superintendent: Tony McIntosh
- Principal: Jessica Cook
- Teaching staff: 131.90 (FTE)
- Grades: 9–12
- Enrollment: 1,306 (2023-2024)
- Student to teacher ratio: 9.90
- Colours: Purple, Black & White
- Athletics conference: Commonwealth Athletic Conference
- Mascot: Ram
- Rival: Greater Lowell Technical High School (Tyngsborough, MA)
- Budget: $27,022,101 total $19,905 per pupil (2016)
- Communities served: Bedford, Billerica, Burlington, Tewksbury & Wilmington
- Website: www.shawsheentech.org

Shawsheen Valley Regional Vocational Technical High School is located in Billerica, Massachusetts, United States. "Shawsheen Tech", or "Shaw Tech" is a public high school serving 5 towns: Burlington, Wilmington, Bedford, Tewksbury and Billerica make up most of the student body.

== Vocational/technical programs ==
Sources:

- Auto Collision Repair & Refinishing
- Automotive Technology
- Business Technology/Marketing
- Carpentry
- Cosmetology
- Culinary Arts
- Dental Assisting
- Design & Visual Communications
- Drafting
- Electricity
- Electronics/Robotics
- Graphic Communications
- HVAC-R (Heating-Ventilation-Air Conditioning-Refrigeration)
- Health Assisting
- Information Support Services & Networking/Programming and Web Development
- Machine Tool Technology
- Masonry & Tile Setting
- Medical Assisting
- Metal Fabrication & Joining Technologies
- Plumbing

== Superintendent-Directors ==
- Benjamin Wolk (1965–1987)
- Charles H. Lyons (1987–2015)
- Timothy Broadrick (2015–2019)
- Melanie Hagmen (interim 2019–2020)
- Bradford Jackson (2020–2022)
- Tony McIntosh (2022–present)
