= Diman Regional Vocational Technical High School =

Location
- 251 Stonehaven Road; Fall River, (Bristol County), Massachusetts 02720; United States; 41°41′54″N 71°7′22″W

Information
- Type: Public High School; Open enrollment
- Established: 1912; 114 years ago
- School district: Greater Fall River Regional Vocational Technical District
- Superintendent: Brian Bentley
- Principal: Leslie Weckesser
- Teaching staff: 143.10 (FTE)
- Grades: 9-12
- Enrollment: 1,443 (2023-2024)
- Student to teacher ratio: 10.08
- Colors: Black & Orange
- Athletics conference: MIAA Mayflower League
- Mascot: Bengal
- Rivals: Greater New Bedford, Bishop Connolly, Bristol-Plymouth
- Budget: $27,757,430 total $20,084 per pupil (2016)
- Communities served: Fall River, Swansea, Westport, Somerset
- Website: dimanregional.org

Diman Regional Vocational Technical High School is a public vocational high school located in Fall River, Massachusetts. The high school serves a regional school district comprising the city of Fall River, and the surrounding towns of Somerset, Swansea and Westport. The school has an enrollment of over 1,400 students and offers vocational-technical education in 18 different programs.

The school also includes the Diman Regional School of Practical Nursing, offering post-graduate education in the field of practical nursing.

Diman received national attention in January 2018, when then-United States Representative Joe Kennedy III gave the Democratic Party's response to Donald Trump’s 2018 State of the Union Address from the school’s automotive shop. Massachusetts’s 4th congressional district, which Kennedy represented at the time, includes the school.

== History ==
The school was founded in Fall River as Diman Vocational School in 1912 by Reverend John Diman, an Episcopal minister who had previously started Diman School for Boys (later renamed St. George's School) in Middletown, Rhode Island. Rev. Diman later converted to Catholicism, became a Benedictine monk, and helped found Portsmouth Abbey School in Portsmouth, Rhode Island.

The Diman Regional Charter was established in 1963 to expand the area of the school's enrollment to include the surrounding towns of Somerset, Swansea and Westport, Massachusetts. The current campus on Stonehaven Road in Fall River opened in 1968.

== Vocational programs ==
Diman currently offers 18 vocational shop programs to students, which are as follows:

- Advanced Manufacturing (formerly Machine Tool Technology)
- Automotive Collision, Repair, and Refinishing
- Automotive Technology
- Building and Property Maintenance
- Business Technology
- Carpentry-Cabinetmaking
- Culinary Arts
- Dental Assisting
- Electricity
- Electronics
- Graphic Communications
- Health Assisting
- HVAC/R (Heating, Ventilation, Air Conditioning, and Refrigeration)
- Mechanical, Architectural, and Additive Manufacturing Engineering (formerly Drafting)
- Medical Assisting
- Metal Fabrication & Joining Technologies
- Plumbing
- Programming and Web Development

== Notable alumni ==
The below are considered distinguished alumni of Diman and are members of Diman's "Alumni Hall of Fame":

- Emeril Lagasse - (1977) - Celebrity chef.
- William A. Flanagan - (1998) - Mayor of Fall River from 2010 to 2014

== Athletics ==
After an almost 30-year hiatus, Diman re-introduced football to the school in 2005. Diman's athletic teams compete at the Division 3 level of Massachusetts Interscholastic Athletic Association athletics, and at Division 3 for football. They compete in the Mayflower League, which is the largest athletics conference in Massachusetts, with 18 schools.

In 2013, the Diman football team won the Mayflower League Championship for the first time in school history. In the process, they also qualified for the MIAA Division 6 State Playoffs. The Bengals won their first round match-up against Upper Cape, but eventually lost the following week to a powerful Millis/Hopedale cooperative team.
