= Innovation Academy Charter School =

Coordinates: 42.6588°N 71.4082°W

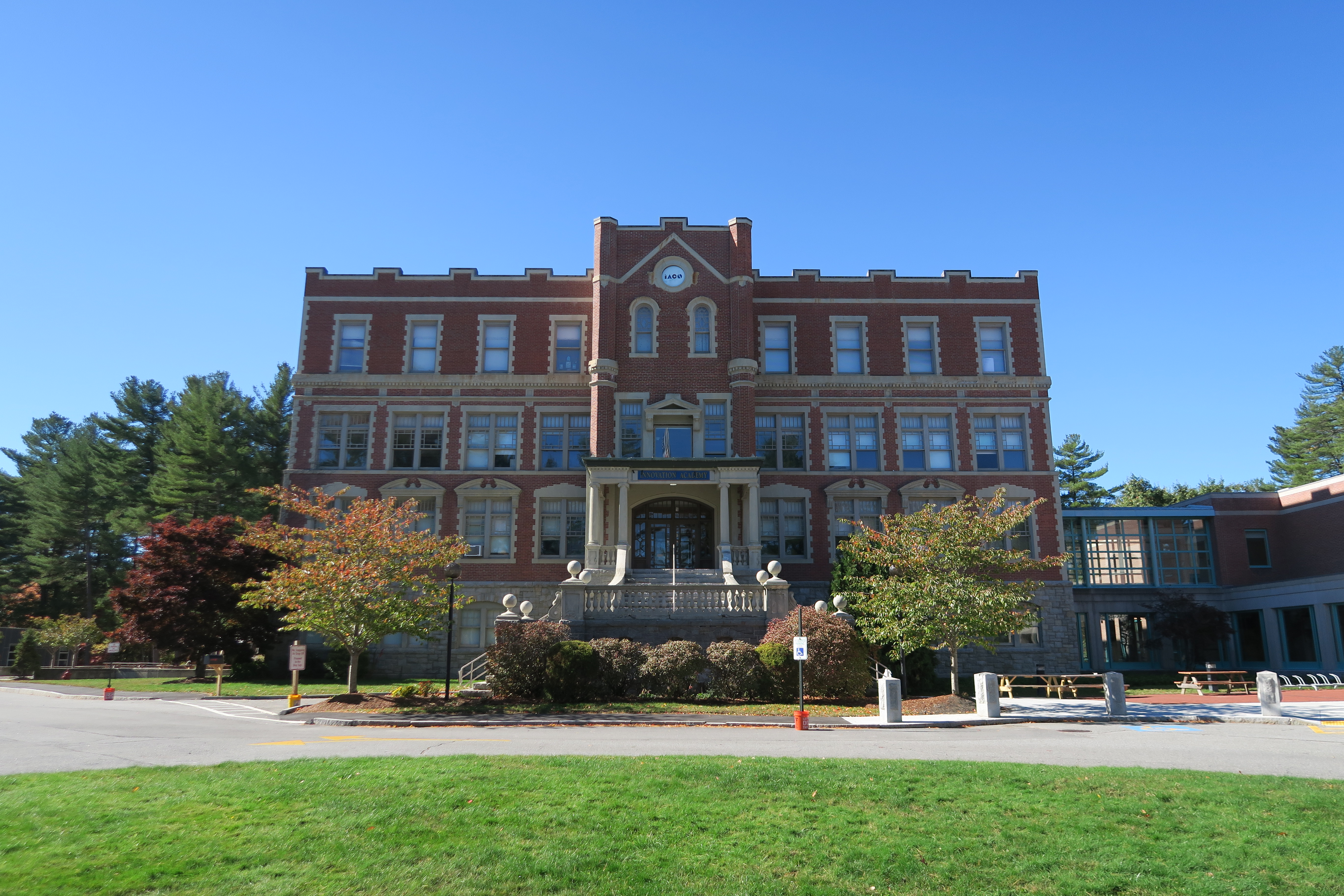
- At the Former Saint Joseph's Marist Novitiate Seminary
- 72 Tyng Road, Tyngsborough, MA 01879; United States

Information
- Type: Public charter
- Motto: Think. Connect. Apply. Innovate.
- School district: Innovation Academy Charter District
- Principal: Federico Pereyra
- Head of school: Gregory J. Orpen
- Faculty: 67.1
- Grades: 5-12
- Enrollment: 766
- Colors: Red, White, and Blue
- Athletics conference: Commonwealth Athletic Conference
- Team name: Hawks
- Newspaper: The Hawk
- Website: www.innovationcharter.org/high-school

Innovation Academy Charter School (IACS) is a small charter school in Tyngsborough, Massachusetts, United States. The school was founded in 1996, under the name Chelmsford Public Charter School by a small group of parents from Chelmsford, Massachusetts. While initially a middle school serving only the town of Chelmsford, IACS has since expanded, establishing a high school and serving multiple towns within Massachusetts.

== History of IACS ==
Innovation Academy Charter School was created in 1996 by a group of parents in Chelmsford, Massachusetts. Its first class of middle school students, grades 5-8, was made up of fewer than 150 students. Originally called Chelmsford Public Charter School, it served students in Chelmsford only.

A few years later, the school was renamed Murdoch Middle School. It then served mainly three towns; Chelmsford, Billerica, and Lowell. It remained in Chelmsford for several years while growing in size, at one point occupying part of the Chelmsford Old Town Hall. Walter Landberg became the executive director and the school was renamed to Innovation Academy Charter School.

The school then moved to its current location in Tyngsborough, Massachusetts, where it became known as a regional charter school, expanding to also serve the towns of Dracut, Groton, Tewksbury, and Westford, among others. The facility was previously used as the Boston University Conference Center, and before that was the Wang Institute of Graduate Studies. Walter Landberg eventually left the school, after completing building projects for a new track and field and a building for the 5th and 6th grades named in his honor.

== IACS Today ==
IACS has since expanded the original school into grades 5-12, a full middle school and high school. The school has four outcomes: problem solving, community membership, effective communication, and self-direction.

=== High school ===
The first graduation class of the high school was spring of 2011. The graduating class had 100% acceptance into a 4-year college. The students are split into groups of approximately 9 students called an "advisory". The advisory is led by a member of the high school staff who helps the students with school work and high school life. The school year is semester based with reports sent home 1/2 of the way through the semester. Before 2023 it was 1/3 and 2/3 of the way through the semester, that students and parents would receive progress reports, however, this system has changed, with only 1 progress report being given through the semester, at about the halfway point. Grading is A, B, C, D, and F. Honors in individual classes are achieved by doing extra work assigned by the teacher and raises the GPA of that class by .5. Honors credit is not received with a D or F grade in that class.

=== Middle school ===
Middle school is divided into 4 "teams". 2 teams are grades 5 and 6, and 2 others are grades 7 and 8. These teams are named after the outcome of the school listed above. The teams are further divided into advisories of 12-13 people. The middle school is made up of about 400 students. The school year is divided into quarters, with reports sent home at the end of every quarter. Students wishing to achieve honor roll must receive at least 3's or above. Distinguished honor roll requires no grade below a 3.5.

==== Grading ====
The middle school used to have a unique grading system. D, P, A, N, and W. As of the school year 2024-2025 the middle school has changed to a more traditional ABC grading system. The system is still unique in the lack of an A+ in the grading system. These grades are associated with point values. Students are graded on Application, Comprehension, and the school outcomes.

== Sports ==
=== Middle school ===
The fall middle school sports teams consists of boys soccer grades 5-8, girls soccer grades 5-8, JV Volleyball grades 5-7, Varsity Volleyball grades 6-8, and cross-country grades 5-8. Boys soccer won their league championship in the 2010 season and the 2014 season. The girls won their league championship in 2013. In 2011 the cross-country team placed 14 at a USATF New England Cross Country Invitational meet. Winter middle school sports are indoor track grades 5-8, cheerleading grades 5-8, boys JV basketball, girls JV basketball, boys varsity basketball, and girls varsity basketball. Indoor track was added in the winter of 2011, as was cheerleading. Spring sports offered are Kickball grade 5, Softball grades 6-8, Baseball grades 6-8,0 Dance grades 5-8, and Co-ed Track & Field grades 5-8. Softball, baseball, dance, and kickball were all added in the 2012 spring season. IACS dance has been very successful in the past, receiving golds, high golds, platinums, and high platinum awards both at regionals and nationals, as well as many overall awards, including 1st place. IACS middle school track and field had a successful second season in spring 2011 when four middle school boys set the New England 4 × 400 metres relay record with a time of 3:44.63. In the 2012 season, the boys placed 2nd in the state meet and girls placed 9th in the state.
