= Arlington School =

Location
- Belmont, Massachusetts; United States; 42°23′43″N 71°11′27″W

Information
- Type: Private High School
- Founded: 1961
- Faculty: 24
- Enrollment: 37 (2013-14)
- Affiliations: McLean Hospital
- Website: www.thearlingtonschool.org

The Arlington School is a private junior-senior high school, providing specialized educational services to adolescents with substantial psychiatric needs.

== History ==
Arlington School is a college preparatory high school located on the grounds of McLean Hospital in Belmont, Massachusetts. Founded in 1961 as a fully independent educational program for adolescents in residence at the hospital, Arlington School has evolved through developments pursuant to Massachusetts Public Law 766 (1972) and the Massachusetts Education Reform Act (1993) to a day school for a diverse body of emotionally challenged students from throughout the Boston metropolitan area.

The Arlington School is located on the McLean Hospital campus in Belmont, Massachusetts.

The Arlington School offers a full college preparatory curriculum, aligned with the Massachusetts Curriculum Frameworks, and leading to a high school diploma. Students often undertake college course work and distance learning courses as part of their academic program. Personal attention is the hallmark of the Arlington School.

Clinical services, including groups and counseling support, are an integral part of a highly individualized program for each student. Teachers and clinical staff work closely with therapists and schools in the community to address the academic, emotional and behavioral issues that have disrupted a student's previous schooling.

The singer James Taylor earned his high school diploma at Arlington.
