= Academy of the Pacific Rim Charter Public School =

Location
- 1 Westinghouse Plaza, Hyde Park, MA; Hyde Park, Massachusetts 02136; United States; 42°14′39.33″N 71°7′55.44″W

Information
- Type: Public, Coeducational
- Established: 1995
- Status: Open
- School district: Academy of the Pacific Rim Charter Public School
- Grades: 5–12
- Athletics conference: Massachusetts Charter School Athletic Organization
- Accreditation: New England Association of Schools and Colleges
- Communities served: Boston, Massachusetts

Academy of the Pacific Rim Charter Public School is a public charter school in Hyde Park, Massachusetts, United States, which serves students from grades five through twelve.

Originally started in 1995 it was founded on the basis of Japanese School ethics and structure while teaching Chinese Culture.
