= Greater Lawrence Technical School =

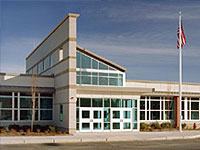

Location
- 57 River Road; Andover, Massachusetts 01810; United States; 42.692687°N 71.195437°W

Information
- Type: Public; Vocational; Open enrollment
- Motto: Expect More - Demand More - Achieve More
- Established: 1965
- School district: Greater Lawrence Technical School
- Superintendent: John Lavoie
- Principal: Gina Turnbow
- Teaching staff: 165.00 (on FTE basis)
- Grades: 9 to 12
- Enrollment: 1,774 (2023–2024)
- Student to teacher ratio: 10.75
- Colors: Black and orange
- Athletics conference: MIAA District A Commonwealth Athletic Conference
- Sports: 2007 Superbowl Champs; 2008 Wrestling Champs
- Team name: Reggies
- Budget: $30,545,587 total $20,488 per pupil (2016)
- Communities served: Andover; Lawrence; Methuen; North Andover
- Website: www.glts.net

Greater Lawrence Technical School, established in 1965, is a four-year regional technical high school, located in Andover, Massachusetts, United States. It serves the communities of Andover, Lawrence, Methuen, and North Andover.

== Programs ==
GLTS offers a number of career and technical education (CTE) programs:

- Automotive Collision & Repair
- Automotive Technology
- Aviation Technology
- Biotechnology
- Business Technology
- Carpentry
- Cosmetology
- Culinary Arts
- Dental Assisting
- Early Education and Care
- Electrical
- Environmental Science
- Health Assisting
- Horticulture/Landscaping
- HVAC/R
- Information Technology
- Advanced Manufacturing (Machine Tool Tech)
- Medical Assisting
- Metal Fabrication & Joining Technologies
- Plumbing
- Robotics and Automation
