= Northeast Metropolitan Regional Vocational High School =

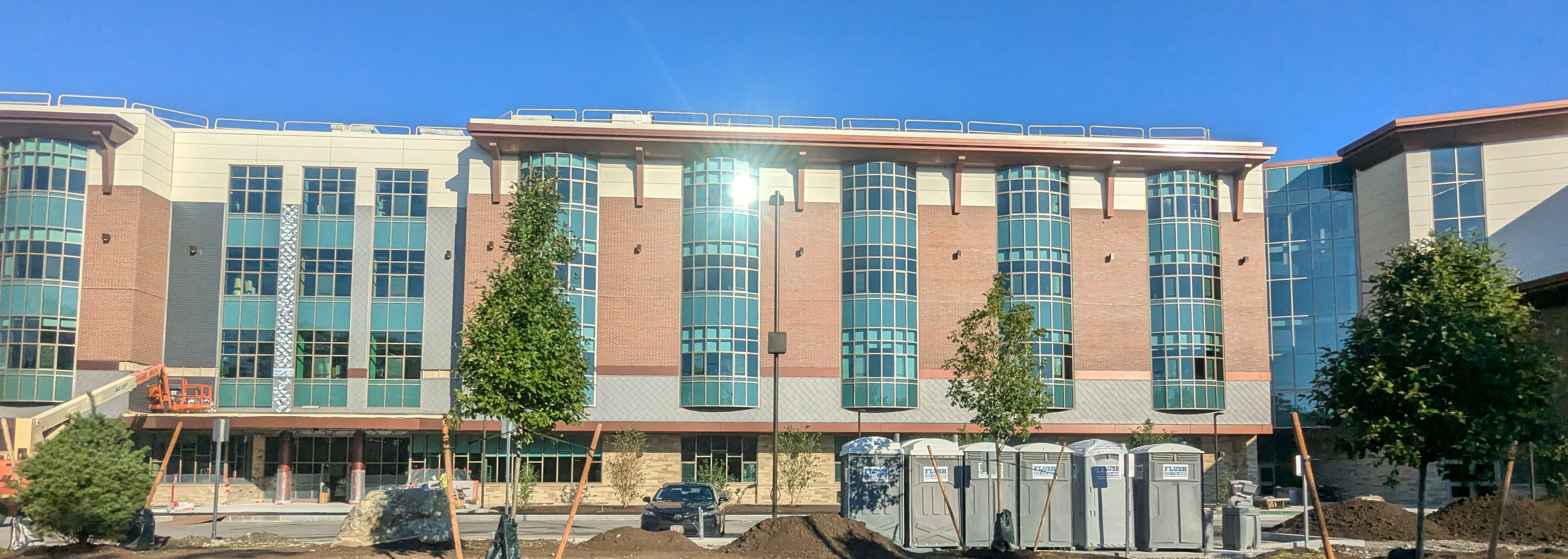
- New Northeast Metro Tech Building

Location
- 100 Hemlock Road; Wakefield, Massachusetts 01880; United States; 42°29′43″N 71°02′36″W

Information
- School type: Public Schools, Vocational-technical school
- Opened: 1968
- School district: Northeast Metropolitan Regional Vocational School District
- NCES District ID: 2508960
- Superintendent: David DiBarri
- CEEB code: 222171
- NCES School ID: 08530605
- Principal: Richard M. Barden
- Teaching staff: 128 (FTE)
- Grades: 9-12
- Enrollment: 1,414 (2025-26)
- Student to teacher ratio: 10.33
- Classes offered: College Preparatory, Honors, Learning Center, Advanced Placement and Early College
- Colors: Black and Gold
- Athletics: Cheerleading, Cross-Country, Field Hockey, Football, Golf, Soccer, Volleyball, Basketball, Ice Hockey, Indoor Track, Swimming, Wrestling, Baseball, Lacrosse, Outdoor Track, Softball, Tennis
- Athletics conference: Commonwealth Athletic Conference
- Mascot: Golden Knights
- Nickname: The Voke
- Team name: Golden Knights
- Budget: $34,650,017 total $27,214 per pupil (2023)

Northeast Metropolitan Regional Vocational High School, also known as Northeast Metro Tech or The Voke, is a regional vocational school located in Wakefield, Massachusetts, United States. It was originally founded in 1968 and draws students from the cities and towns of Chelsea, Malden, Melrose, North Reading, Reading, Revere, Saugus, Stoneham, Wakefield, Winchester, Winthrop, and Woburn.

The number of students each city or town sends is dependent on its population and the amount of money it contributes to the budget of the school. The City of Malden is the largest contributor of students, Chelsea is the second largest contributor, and Woburn is the third. Also, students from Everett, Lynn, Lynnfield and Medford, which border the Northeast Metropolitan Regional Vocational School District, may attend the school if they apply and are approved.

Students in their third trimester of junior year, or all year in senior year, may be eligible to try a Co-op program. This program allows students to go from being in their career technical area at school to working in a paid job site.

The football team won back-to-back Division 4A State Championships in 2009 and 2010.

== Career and Technical Education ==
Northeast Metro Tech currently offers twenty vocational programs that provides students with hands on training and career preparation of industries. During their senior year, students are offered the opportunity to participate in an additional STEM experience during their vocational program week. The STEM experience takes place on one day of the student’s scheduled program week and provides students with additional exposure to science, technology, engineering, and mathematics.

The twenty vocational programs are:

1. Automotive Collision Repair and Refinishing

2. Automotive Technology

3. Biotechnology

4. Business Technology

5. Carpentry

6. Construction Craft Laborer

7. Cosmetology

8. Culinary Arts

9. Dental Assisting

10. Design and Visual Communications

11. Drafting and Design

12. Early Childhood Education

13. Electrical

14. Health Assisting

15. HVAC and Refrigeration

16. Marketing Technology

17. Medical Assisting

18. Metal Fabrication

19. Plumbing and Pipefitting

20. Robotics and Automation

== New Building Construction ==
In 2016, Superintendent David DiBarri began discussions with state legislators to gain support for a new school building for Northeast Metro Tech. A feasibility study was conducted to assess potential options, and the decision was made to demolish the existing facility and construct a new building on the current campus. The project was subsequently approved to appear on the ballot for a district-wide vote.

On January 25, 2022, the twelve municipalities that send students to the school, referred to as "sending communities", held a special election to determine whether to approve funding for the project. Of the twelve communities, only Chelsea voted against the proposal; however, approximately 80% of voters supported the measure, securing the necessary approval for the project to proceed. Construction officially began in August 2022. Site mobilization took place in September and October 2023. The new school building reached completion in May 2026 and opened at the start of the 2026–2027 academic year, opening to students on September 2nd.
