= East Bridgewater High School =

Coordinates: 42°01′41.36″N 70°57′20.15″W

East Bridgewater Junior Senior High School
- 143 Plymouth St. East Bridgewater, Massachusetts 02333; United States

Information
- Type: Public; Open enrollment
- Established: 1958/2013 (current campus)
- Principal: William Silva
- Staff: 69.20 (FTE)
- Grades: 7–12
- Enrollment: 904 (2024–25)
- Student to teacher ratio: 13.06
- Campus: Suburban
- Colors: Navy, Gold & White
- Mascot: Viking
- Rivals: West Bridgewater High School
- Newspaper: The Viking Visionary
- Yearbook: The Torch
- Website: https://ebjshs.ebps.net/

East Bridgewater Junior Senior High School is a public secondary school located at 143 Plymouth Street in East Bridgewater, Massachusetts, United States. The school serves students in grades 7–12 and has an enrollment of 904 students as of the 2024–25 school year.

== History ==
The school's former campus opened in 1958. In 1975, a building addition program added to academic support and athletic facilities while doubling the enrollment capacity of the school. Currently, the school enrolls around 1000 students in grades 7–12.

=== Current ===
A new Jr./Sr. High School opened in fall of 2013. The new school sits on land formerly occupied by the school athletic fields and tennis courts. New fields were constructed on the site of the original building.

== Controversies ==
=== Racism ===
In 2019, a video was leaked from Snapchat to the internet that displayed multiple East Bridgewater High School students in blackface and saying "what's up my nigga" and "nigger". The school had sent out an email stating that, "this will not be a one and done discussion". After the email was sent out, multiple stories came out about how they have had similar experiences in the school in years past.

=== Phone App Threat ===
In 2018, an anonymous individual sent a threatening message to the school administrators through the school's anonymous tip app "STOPit". The message made mentions of the Columbine High School tragedy, as claimed by local Police. The threatening message was taken seriously by school administrators and was forwarded to the local East Bridgewater Police Department and promptly responded to. The school was immediately after put under lockdown for two hours as East Bridgewater Police searched every floor. The school later sent out an email to parents letting them know of the situation.

== Music ==
The East Bridgewater High School Marching Band was an undefeated champion in Division One of the New England Scholastic Band Association from the late 1990s until 2010.

== Notable alumni ==
- Joe Lauzon – professional mixed martial artist, current UFC competitor in the Lightweight Division
- Tom Everett Scott – professional television actor and film actor

== See also ==
- High school (North America)
- Education in the United States
