= Nashoba Valley Technical High School =

School in Westford, Massachusetts, US

Coordinates: 42°34′01.99″N 71°25′31.95″W

Location
- 100 Littleton Road; Westford, Massachusetts 01886; United States

Information
- Type: Public Regional Vocational Technical; Open enrollment
- Motto: Your Skills Focused Public High School
- Established: 1968
- Superintendent: Denise Pigeon
- Principal: Jeremy Slotnick
- Teaching staff: 67.35 (FTE)
- Enrollment: 773 (2023-2024)
- Student to teacher ratio: 11.48
- Campus: suburban
- Colors: Blue & White
- Athletics conference: Commonwealth Athletic Conference
- Nickname: The Tech; NT; Nash Toke (pre-2017)
- Budget: $13,172,102 total $18,373 per pupil (2016)
- Mascot: Viking
- Website: http://www.nashobatech.net

Nashoba Valley Technical High School is a four-year, public regional vocational high school located on Route 110 in Westford, Massachusetts, United States. Following a $25 million renovation and expansion, its service area covers 14 communities including the seven District towns of Ayer, Chelmsford, Groton, Littleton, Pepperell, Shirley, Townsend and Westford.

== Athletics ==
Members of the Commonwealth Athletic Conference, the Nashoba Tech Vikings compete in Division III.

- Fall
  - Boys' Soccer
  - Girls' Soccer
  - Football Cheer
  - Boys' Cross Country
  - Girls' Cross Country
  - Football
  - Golf
  - Volleyball
- Winter
  - Boys Basketball (Varsity, JV & Freshman)
  - Girls Basketball (Varsity & JV)
  - Ice Hockey
  - Basketball Cheer
  - Wrestling
- Spring
  - Baseball (Varsity & JV)
  - Boys Lacrosse
  - Girls Lacrosse
  - Softball (Varsity & JV)
  - Boys and Girls Track & Field

== Technical programs ==
- Advanced Manufacturing
- Automotive Collision Repair & Refinishing
- Automotive Technology
- Carpentry
- Cosmetology
- Culinary Arts
- Dental Assisting
- Design & Visual Communications
- Early Childhood Education & Care
- Electrical Technology
- Engineering Technology
- Health Assisting
- Hospitality Management
- Marketing (This program is closing soon.)
- Plumbing & Heating
- Programming & Web Development
- Robotics & Automation
- Television & Media Production/Theatre Arts
- Veterinary Assisting

== Services provided ==
- Automotive Technology
- Auto Collision Repair & Refinishing
- Cosmo Cuts Salon
- Design & Visual Communication
- Elegant Chef and Bistro
- Lowell Five Bank (ATM in front driveway)
- Programming and Web Design
