= Blue Hills Regional Technical School =

Coordinates: 42.1814°N 71.1053°W

The Blue Hills Regional Vocational Technical High School
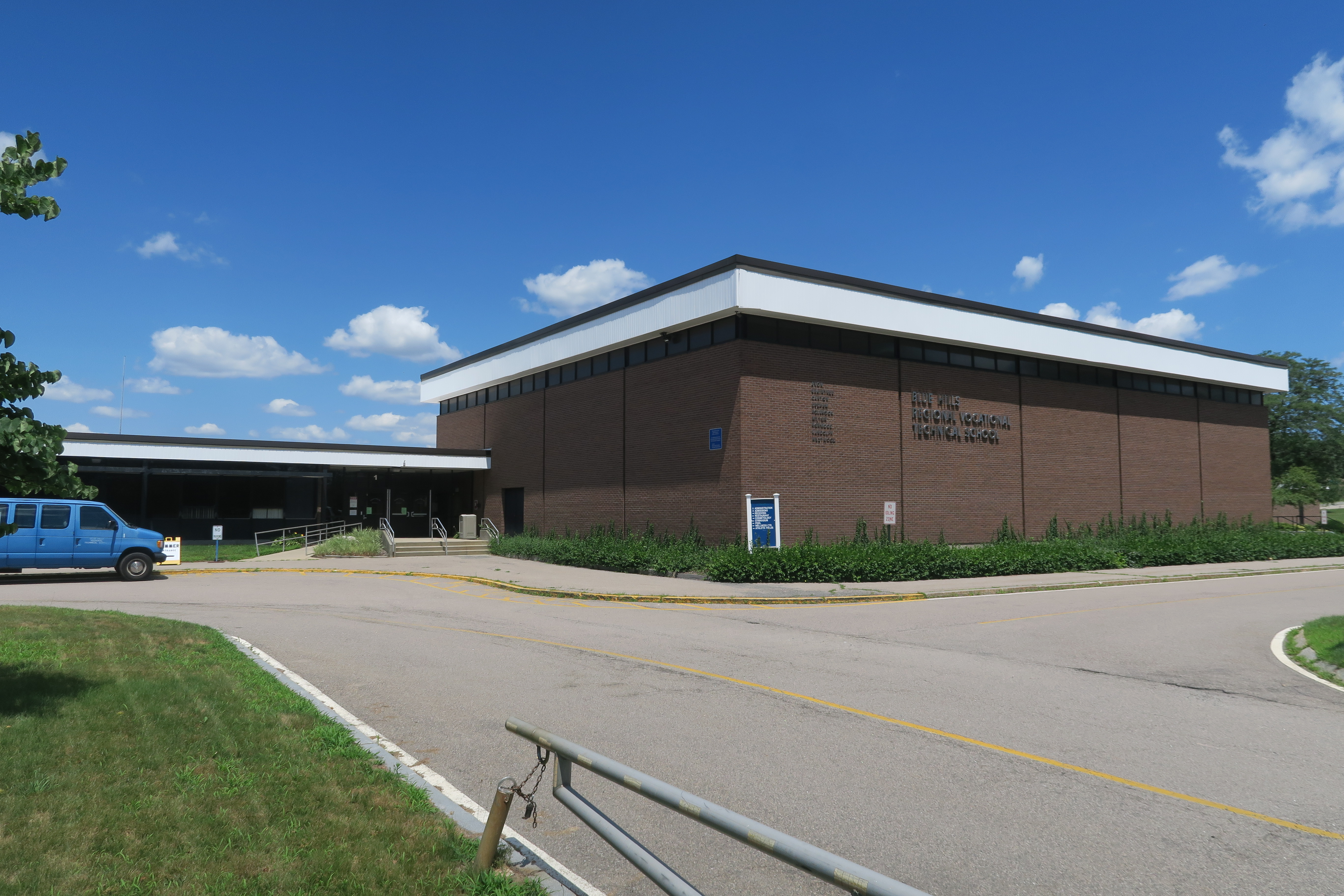
- 800 Randolph St, Canton, MA 02021

Information
- Type: Public
- Established: 1963
- Superintendent: Jill Rossetti
- Dean: Mark Aubrey
- Principal: Geoffrey Zini
- Teaching staff: 82.02 (FTE)
- Grades: 9–12
- Enrollment: 910 (2024-2025)
- Student to teacher ratio: 11.09
- Campus: Suburban
- Colors: Blue, Green & White
- Mascot: Warriors
- Rivals: Bristol-Plymouth Regional Technical School, Southeastern Regional Vocational Technical High School
- Newspaper: The Blue Banner
- Yearbook: The Warrior
- Budget: $21,106,046.92 total $23,629.70 per pupil (2021)
- Communities served: Avon, Braintree, Milton, Canton, Norwood, Randolph, Dedham, Westwood, Holbrook
- Website: http://www.bluehills.org/

The Blue Hills Regional Vocational Technical High School is a high school in Canton, Massachusetts. It is in the geographical center of member towns of the Blue Hills Regional School District: Avon, Braintree, Milton, Canton, Norwood, Randolph, Dedham, Westwood, and Holbrook. The school is situated on a 35-acre (140,000 m^{2}) campus that borders the DCR's Blue Hills Reservation, and is within view of Great Blue Hill. The schools mascot is the Warriors

The Blue Hills Regional School District was formed on December 17, 1963, to serve the needs of the member towns' residents. The District School Committee was then authorized by the towns to establish and maintain educational programs at the secondary, post-secondary and adult levels in accordance with the provisions of Chapter 74 of the General Laws of Massachusetts, which require all municipalities in Massachusetts to offer vocational education for high school students that request it.

The original school building was opened to the first class in September 1966. Its success, coupled with increasing admissions, necessitated the building of additional facilities. Moreover, local employers were expressing a need for employees trained in certain skills areas. By 1976, the school had been expanded to house approximately 1,230 students in the high school, while also serving another 1,400 students in the adult education programs.

== Shops ==
Blue Hills offers 17 sections:

- Auto Body
- Auto Repair
- Construction Technology
- Computer Information Systems (CIS)
- Design and Visual Communications
- Cosmetology
- Criminal Justice
- Culinary Arts
- Drafting/CAD
- Early Education and Care
- Electrical Technology
- Electronics Engineering Technology
- Engineering Technology
- Graphic Communications
- Health Assisting
- HVAC&R
- Metal Fabrication

== Athletics ==
- Baseball
- Basketball
- Football
- Cheerleading
- Golf
- Ice Hockey
- Lacrosse
- Soccer
- Softball
- Swimming
- Track and Field
- Volleyball
- Rugby (Added in 2015)

The football team has played in the MIAA Division IV State Championship game twice (1984, 2010). On December 3, 2011, Blue Hills was victorious in the MIAA Division 4A Super Bowl against Cathedral (Boston), 16–14. The football team has also played in the MIAA Small School Vocational Super Bowl four times (2012, 2013, 2021, 2023). On November 29, 2012, Blue Hills defeated Minuteman Regional, 26–8. On December 6, 2013, they defeated North Shore Tech, 23–22. On December 3, 2021, Blue Hills defeated Nashoba Valley Tech 52-51. On November 29, 2023, Blue Hills also defeated Tri-County 44-7.

== Notable alumni ==
- Rich Amiri - Rapper
- Scott Tingle - NASA astronaut
