= Lynn Vocational and Technical Institute =

Coordinates: 42°27′35.19″N 70°57′20.70″W

Lynn Vocational Technical Institute

Location
- 80 Neptune Blvd; Lynn, Massachusetts, 01902; United States

Information
- School district: Lynn Public Schools
- Teaching staff: 111.34 (FTE)
- Student to teacher ratio: 12.45
- Athletics conference: Commonwealth Athletic Conference

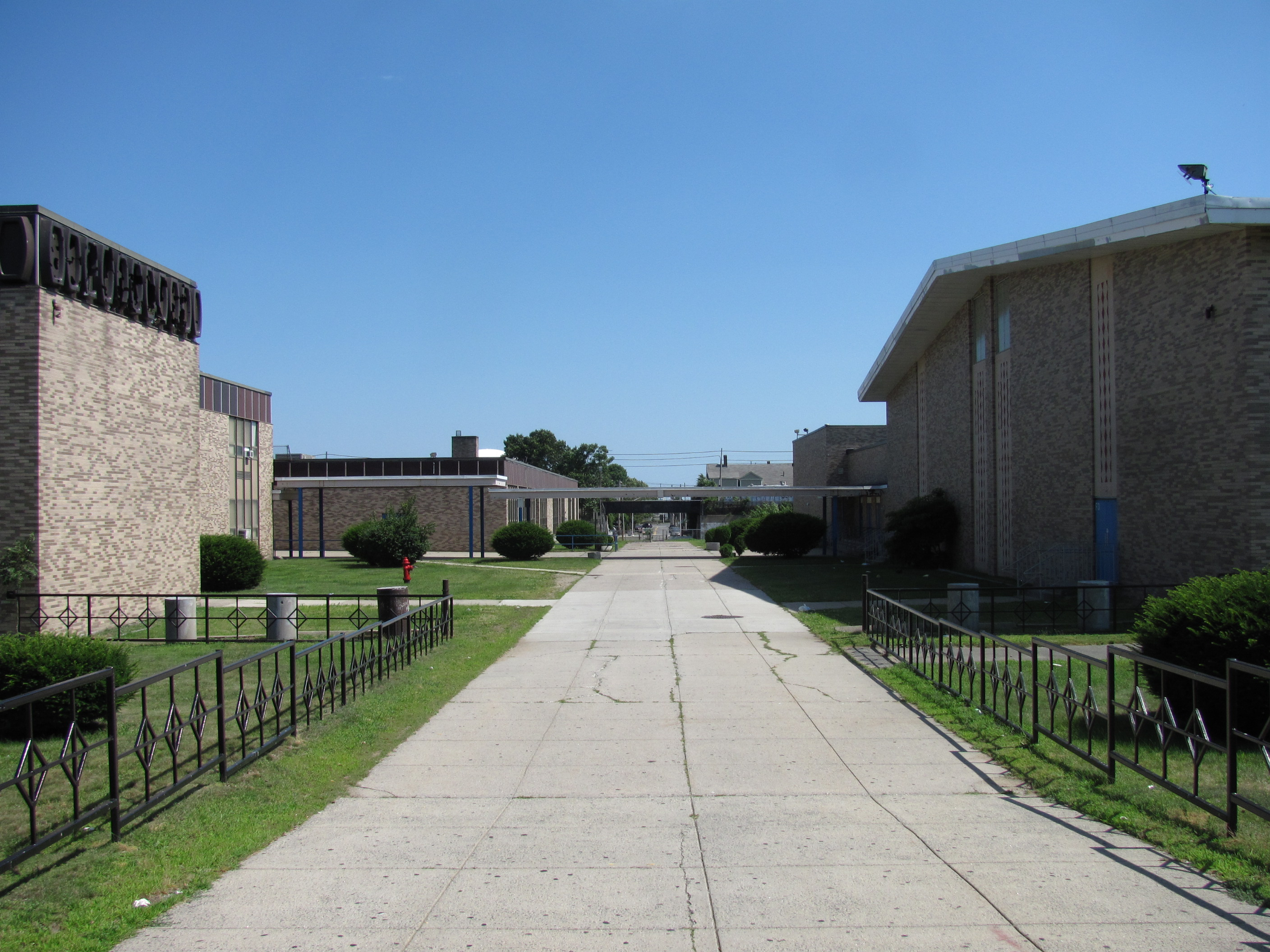
Lynn Vocational and Technical Institute

The Lynn Vocational Technical Institute (a.k.a. LVTI, Lynn Tech), is a vocational and technical high school located in Lynn, Massachusetts, United States and is part of the Lynn Public Schools district.

== History ==
The first two graduation commencement exercises, 1948/49, were held in the Classical High School auditorium; in 1950 they were held at the E. J. Harrington School's auditorium until 1971; the first graduation program at the new Lynn Vocational Technical Institute was conducted in 1972 when diplomas were presented to 104 graduates in the school cafetorium.
