= Whittier Regional Vocational Technical High School =

Coordinates: 42°48′38.5″N 71°1′25.1″W

Location
- 115 Amesbury Line Road; Haverhill, Massachusetts 01830; United States

Information
- Type: Public secondary/Technical; Open enrollment
- Established: 1972
- School board: Whittier Regional Vocational Technical School District School Committee
- School district: Whittier Regional Vocational Technical School District
- Superintendent: Maureen Lynch
- Assistant Superintendent & Principal: Chris Laganas
- Teaching staff: 124.17 (FTE)
- Grades: 9–12
- Enrollment: 1,279 (2023-2024)
- Student to teacher ratio: 10.30
- Campus: Suburban
- Colors: Maroon & Gold
- Athletics: Yes
- Athletics conference: Commonwealth Athletic Conference
- Mascot: Wildcat
- Budget: $23,767,184 total $18,220 per pupil (2016)
- Communities served: Haverhill, Newburyport, newbury, West Newbury, Rowley, Amesbury, Merrimac, Georgetown, Groveland, Ipswich, Salisbury
- Website: www.whittiertech.org

Whittier Regional Vocational Technical High School, also known as “Whittier Tech” and/or “Big Whittier,” was founded in 1972.

== Location and staff ==
Located in the city of Haverhill, MA, United States, the school currently serves about 1400 students, with a 12:1 student-teacher ratio. It serves many surrounding cities and towns primarily in the northern section of Essex County, accepting students from Haverhill, Newburyport, Newbury, West Newbury, Rowley, Amesbury, Merrimac, Georgetown, Groveland, Ipswich and Salisbury.

== Naming ==
The school was named in honor of local resident, Quaker poet, and slavery abolitionist John Greenleaf Whittier. Alongside this school, there is also a middle school called “J. G. Whittier Middle School” located in Haverhill also named after the poet.

== Demographics ==
According to Massachusetts Department of Elementary and Secondary Education annual statistics, for the 2018-2019 academic year, the demographic enrollment distributions for race, gender and grade level at Whittier Regional Vocational Technical High School are as follows:

Total number of enrolled students: 1,546
Total number of full-time equivalent educators: 113.2
Therefore, the student to teacher ratio for this school is 13.7:1

Enrollment by Race/Ethnicity (2018-2019)
Race	Enrolled Pupils*	% of District
African American	36	2.3%
Asian	15	1%
Hispanic	323	20.9%
Native American	5	0.3%
White	1,112	71.9%
Native Hawaiian, Pacific Islander	0	0%
Multi-Race, Non-Hispanic	54	3.5%
Total	1,546	100%

* Approximate number of enrolled pupils is calculated based on total number of students in district, multiplied by reported percentage, and rounded to nearest whole student.

Enrollment by gender (2018-2019)
Gender	Enrolled pupils	Percentage
Female	573	37.06%
Male	973	62.94%
Non-binary	0	0%
Total	1,546	100%

Enrollment by Grade
Grade	Pupils Enrolled	Percentage
9	320	20.7%
10	284	18.37%
11	324	20.96%
12	318	20.57%
SP*	0	0%
Total	1,546	100%

* SP = Special Education Beyond Grade 12
