= Hoosac Valley High School =

Coordinates: 42°35′34.30″N 73°06′59.33″W

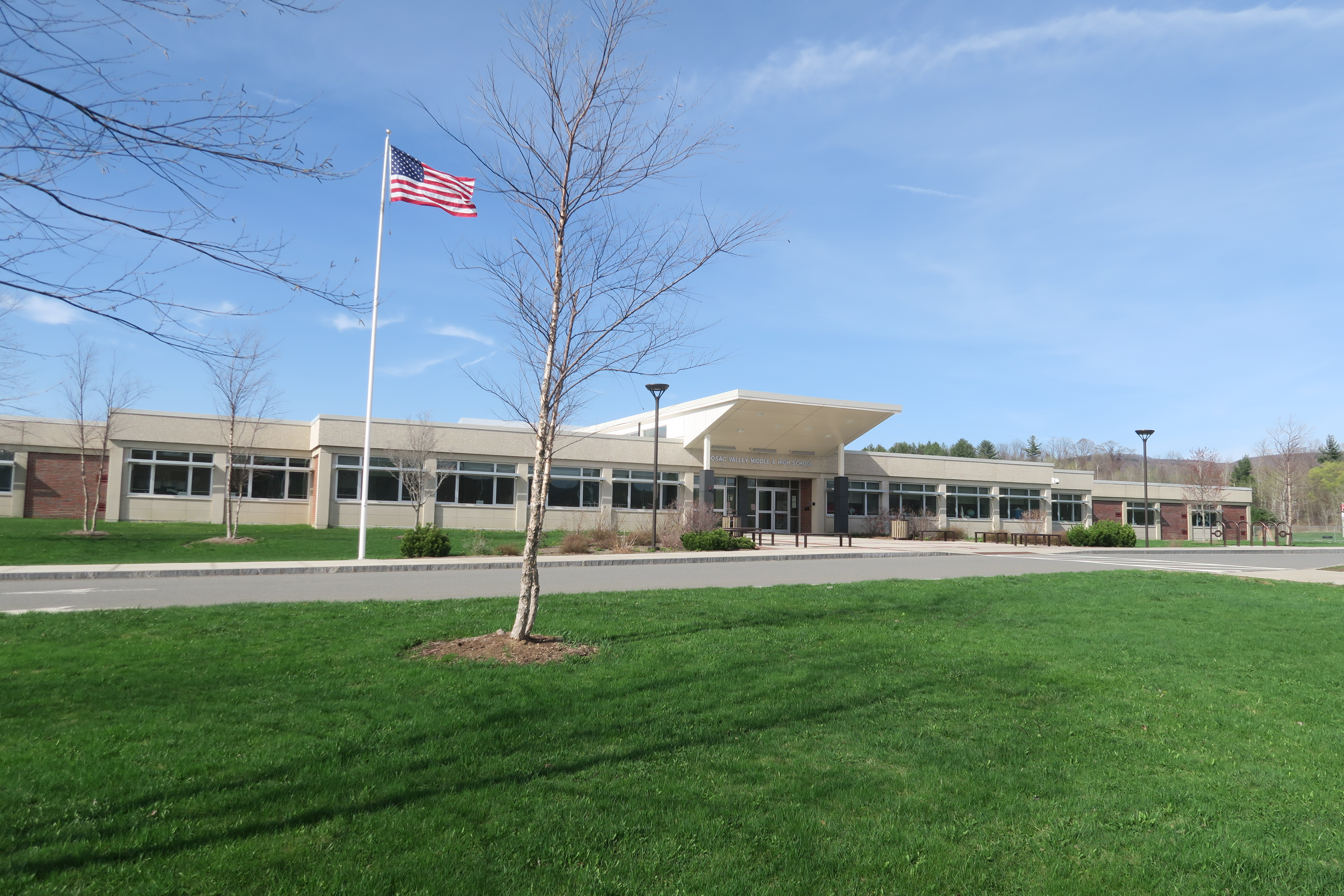
- Hoosac Valley Middle and High School

Location
- 125 Savoy Road; Cheshire, MA 01220; United States

Information
- Type: Public; Open enrollment
- Status: open
- School district: Hoosac Valley Regional
- Superintendent: Aaron Dean
- Principal: Colleen Byrd
- Teaching staff: 28.05 (FTE)
- Grades: 4 through 12
- Age: 10 to 19
- Enrollment: 296 (2024–2025)
- Average class size: 15.0
- Student to teacher ratio: 10.55
- Language: English
- Colors: Red and white
- Mascot: Sparky the Hurricane
- Budget: $20,165,270 total $13,483 per pupil (2016)

Hoosac Valley High School is a public institution of secondary education located in Cheshire, Massachusetts, United States. It primarily serves students residing in the towns of Adams, Cheshire, and Savoy. Hoosac Valley, abbreviated HVHS, hosts grades 4 through 12. It, along with Hoosac Valley Elementary School comprise the Hoosac Valley Regional School District. The 7th and 8th graders of the HVRSD attend classes at Hoosac Valley High School, though they may not take part in many high school sports unless there is a shortage of players, and their section of the school is known as Hoosac Valley Middle School and the younger children stay, for the most part, separated from the older ones throughout the duration of the school day.

== History ==
Hoosac Valley High School opened in the year 1970, with the first class graduating in 1971. HVHS replaced Adams Memorial High School, the current location of the Adams Memorial Middle School. For a brief time, Adams Memorial Middle School closed due to the building being unsafe and its students (grades 7 & 8) moved to Hoosac Valley High School. A major renovation of the Hoosac Valley High School campus forced the student population (grades 7–12) to take classes at the Adams Memorial Middle School campus. Work on the Hoosac Valley High School campus began in 2010 and was completed in time to readmit students (now grades 6–12) in the fall of 2012. In 2019, the school district containing the high school renamed from the Adams-Cheshire Regional School District to the Hoosac Valley Regional School District.

== Hoosac trivia and tradition ==
HVHS's school colors are red and white.

Sports teams use the name "Hurricanes," with Sparky the Lightning Bolt as their mascot. Occasionally, the name "Hurricanes" is shortened to just "Canes."

Like most schools, Hoosac has a rival: Drury High School, located in North Adams, Massachusetts.

In the 2009–2010 school year, the Hurricane football team won the Western Massachusetts Division II Championship with a record of 12–0.

In 2009, the Hoosac Boys' Basketball team made it to the Massachusetts championships, coincidentally playing their rival Drury for the Western Mass Champions title. Hoosac won the Western Mass title and later lost in the state semifinals to the Milton High Wildcats.

The Hoosac Valley girls basketball program has been one of the most consistently dominant in the state of Massachusetts since 2010. It has won 11 of the last 12 Western Massachusetts Championships, winning seven of the last eight in the old sectional format and four straight in the new PVIAC Class D format. Hoosac went to four straight state championship games in 2014, 2015, 2016 and 2017, losing all four times. The team lost the Western Massachusetts Final to another rival, Wahconah, in 2018. In 2019, Hoosac went to the Division III state title game and beat St. Mary's Lynn to win its first state championship in program history. In 2020, Hoosac returned to the state final, although it was not played due to the COVID-19 pandemic and Hoosac was awarded a share of the state title, technically giving it a repeat.

After COVID, in 2022, Hoosac went to the Division V State Title and lost to Hopedale. It went to the state semifinals the next year and in 2023-24, won the Division V State Championship by beating West Boylston. After that game concluded, the Hoosac Valley boys basketball team played in the Division V boys championship against New Mission, losing a close game.

In 2024-25, the Hoosac girls came back from a 13-point halftime deficit to beat Renaissance School and claim a second straight Division V Championship.
