= West Bridgewater Middle-Senior High School =

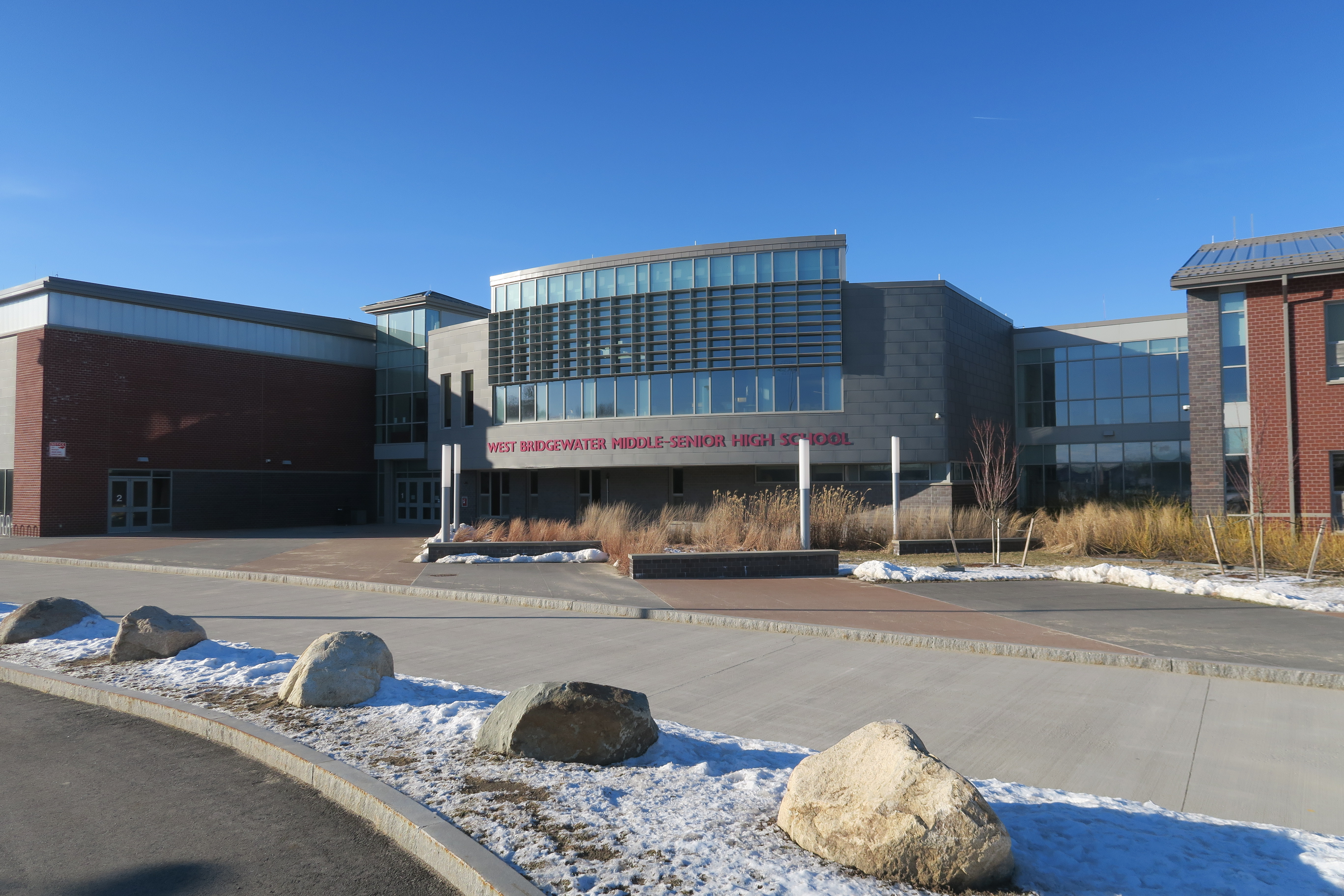

Location
- 155 West Center St., West Bridgewater, Massachusetts 02379; United States; 42.0188°N 71.0158°W

Information
- Type: Public, open enrollment
- Established: 1968
- Principal: Christine Page
- Grades: 7–12
- Enrollment: 619 (2016–17)
- Campus: Suburban
- Colors: Maroon & white
- Mascot: Wildcat
- Rival: East Bridgewater High School
- Yearbook: Climber
- Website: www.wbridgewaterschools.org/o/ms-middle-senior-hs

West Bridgewater Middle-Senior High School is a junior-senior high school located at 155 West Center St. in West Bridgewater, Massachusetts, United States. The school serves roughly 600 students in grades 7–12. The school's mascot is the wildcat, and the school's colors are maroon and white.

== Athletics ==
The football team won the Division 6B State Championship in 1991.

The football team won the Division 4 State Championship in 2006.

Furthermore, the Wildcats' football team were also State Finalists in 1992, 1993, 1999 and 2007.

The girls cross country team has won the Mayflower League Championship for 16 years straight and the boys have won for 8 years straight (as of 2022).

In 2017, freshman Colleen O'Toole became the first female quarterback in Massachusetts history ever to play in a high school varsity game.

== History ==
The town of West Bridgewater completed the construction of a new high school in 2015 to address the existing building's many deficiencies, which caused the school's accreditation to be placed on "warning status" in 2009 by the New England Association of Schools and Colleges (NEASC). The new school opened in September 2015, and is two stories tall, and has a greater capacity than the previous facility.

There is a "heritage committee" run by students who work to discover various means of preserving the history and the culture of the school.
