= Tyngsborough High School =

Tyngsboro High School
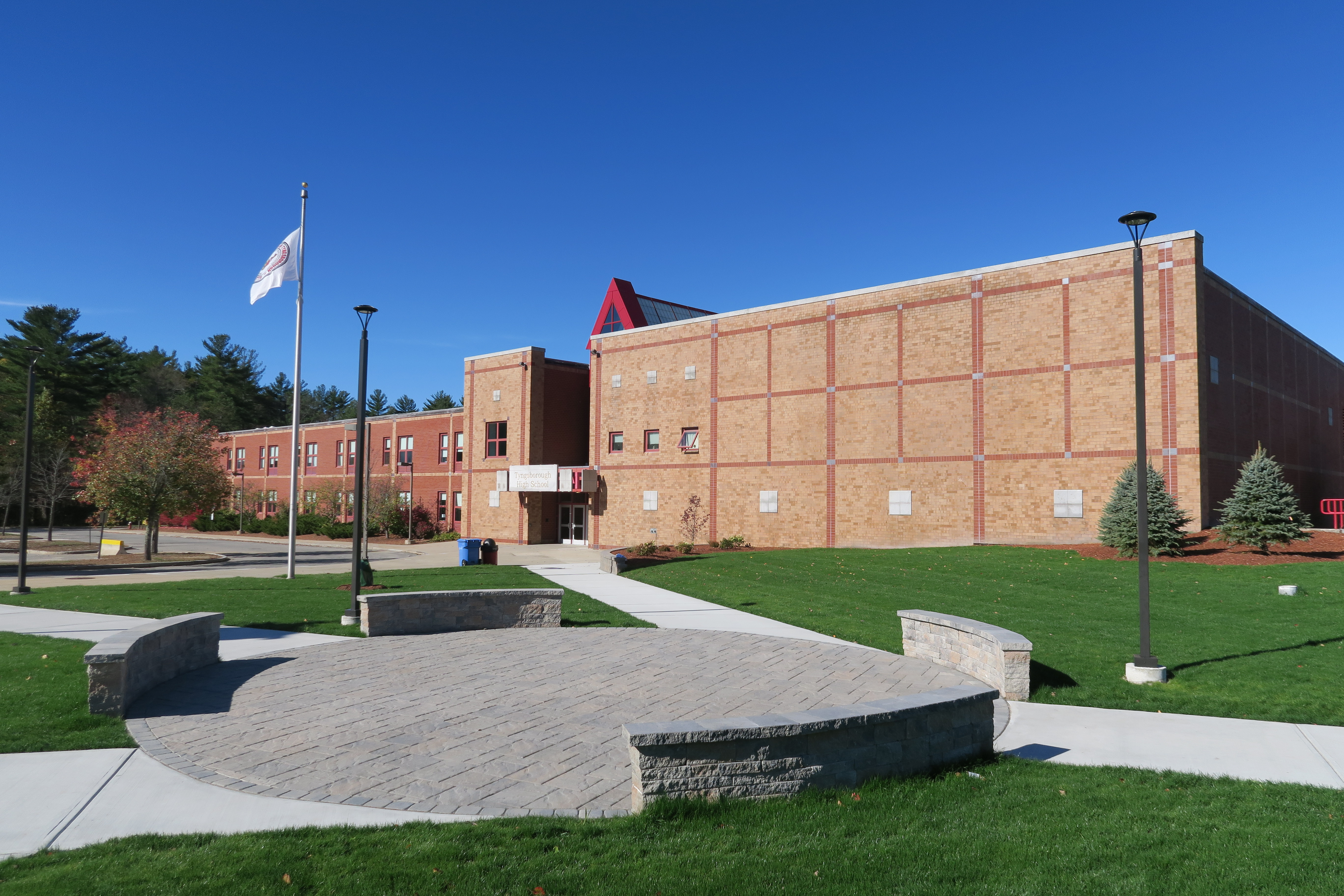

Location
- 36 norris rd Tyngsborough, MA 01879; United States; 42.6975°N 71.4083°W

Information
- Type: Public; Secondary; Open enrollment
- Established: 1992 (current building)
- School district: Tyngsborough Public Schools
- Superintendent: Michael Woodlock
- Principal: Jeff Ogden
- Staff: 54
- Teaching staff: 43
- Grades: 9–12
- Enrollment: 405 (2024-2025)
- Colors: Red, Black and White
- Slogan: collaboration, engagement, integrity, perseverance, respect
- Fight song: Eye of the Tiger
- Athletics: Lacrosse, football, basketball, etc
- Athletics conference: Midland Wachusett League
- Mascot: Tigers
- Accreditation: NEASC
- Newspaper: The Bridge
- MCAS % proficient and advanced: ELA: 93 Math: 87 Science: 89 (Spring 2011)
- Website: ths.tyngsboroughps.org

Tyngsborough High School (THS) is a high school at 36 Norris Road in Tyngsborough, Middlesex County, Massachusetts, United States. It has approximately 484 students as of 2019, and is part of the Tyngsborough school district.

== History ==
The current Tyngsborough High School building for grades 9-12 opened in 1992. Previously, grades 7-12 attended the Tyngsborough Junior-Senior High school, which the now serves as Tyngsborough Middle School for grades 6-8.

Tyngsborough High School was built next to the old Junior-Senior High School. Additionally, Tyngsborough Elementary School was constructed on its own campus in 2003. This allowed elementary grades 1-5, middle school grades 6-8, and high school grades 9-12 their own campuses. This configuration exists today, with Tyngsborough Elementary on one campus and Tyngsborough Middle and Tyngsborough High on another campus.

== Campus ==
The current Tyngsborough High School was opened in 1992. The school stands next to the previous high school, (currently Tyngsborough Middle School) is two stories tall, and contains a gym, cafe, and auditorium. Designed by Todd Jersey, then of HMFH Architecture Inc., it is naturally lit and "organized around an 'interior street' that provides a central gathering and socializing space for students, staff, and faculty in a cold-winter climate." In the back of the building, there are two softball/baseball fields. The high school also has a turf football field that is used for soccer, lacrosse, football, and many other activities.

== Curriculum ==
Tyngsborough has a trimester system, where courses formerly offered for one semester will now be a 2.5 credit, one trimester course. Most Tyngsborough students undertake a college preparatory curriculum that includes twenty credits each of English and of mathematics, fifteen credits each of social sciences, laboratory-based sciences and wellness/physical education, ten credits of a single foreign language, five credits of fine and performing arts. Students must also complete a five credit "Capstone Experience".

Students can choose from twelve Advanced Placement courses to earn college credits.

The English department requires one course each on world literature and American literature. Electives include courses in various forms of creative writing, digital literacy, journalism, broadcast journalism (through the unified arts department), Shakespeare, drama, research, public speaking, and various literature courses focused on world authors, American, war, and contemporary and modern authors. The social studies core requires two U.S. history courses and a world history course. Humanities electives include American conflict, international relations, American culture in the 1960s, psychology, street law, contemporary issues, world cultures and faiths, and citizenship. Humanities AP courses are offered in Literature and Composition, Language and Composition, US History, World History, Government and Politics, and Microeconomics.

Tyngsborough's foreign language offerings are entirely focused on Spanish. However, there are exploratory electives in French and Portuguese. There is the AP electives for Spanish Language, and additional electives in Spanish language children's literature, Spanish for everyday conversation, Spanish cinema, and Latin American popular culture.

Tyngsborough's science/technology department offers courses in Science, Technology, and Social Issues, immunology, neurology, various environmental science courses, anatomy and physiology, marine biology, forensics, and astronomy. Its AP offerings include Biology, Chemistry, and Physics (B). AP level courses are offered through the math department for Statistics, and both Calculus options. Additional math electives include engineering, discrete math, business math, and linear algebra.

The unified arts program includes sequences in ceramics, mixed media, film analysis, and music theory, with individual courses in drawing, painting, sculpture, videography, media literacy, concert band, songwriting, theater production, theater stagecraft, musical theater, playwriting, advanced acting, and portfolio design.

Business electives include courses in accounting, business management, consumer economics, business and personal finance, sports and entertainment marketing, and international business.

== Sports ==
In 1980, The Tyngsboro Tigers Football Team had a record of 8-1-1 after not winning in 1978 and 1979.

In 1994, The Tyngsboro Tigers Football Team won the Division 5B Super Bowl in Walpole, MA beating Nantucket 31-7, bringing the first MIAA state championship to the town of Tyngsborough.

In 1999, the Tyngsboro Tigers Girls Varsity Basketball Team won the MIAA Division 4 Championship at Bentley College.

From 2001-2003, the Tyngsboro Tigers Football Team had a 3-year run as CAC Champions, 3 playoff wins and runner up finishes in 3 MIAA Division 5 Super Bowls. Notable playoff wins during that time were against Cohasset, Hopkinton and Bishop Fenwick.

In 2001, the Tyngsboro High School girls cross country team won the EMASS Division IV Championships and finished 3rd in the Massachusetts All State Meet.

In 2003, the Tyngsboro High School girls cross country team won the EMASS Division IV Championships and finished 6th in the Massachusetts All State Meet.

They entered the Dual County League in 2007. The school experienced little to no success in most sports in the DCL, largely owing to the smaller number of students. In 2011, the athletic program transitioned from Eastern to Central MA, joining the Midland-Wachusett League, C division.

In 2007 and 2008, the Tyngsboro Tigers Baseball team won Back-to-Back Division 3 North State Championships.

In 2008, the soccer team made it to the division 3 north finals. Bob Engel III was a standout member of the golf team.

In 2010, the Wrestling team became the Division 3 State Champions

In 2011, the Wrestling team repeated as Division 3 state Champions

In 2011, The Tyngsboro Boys Soccer Team in the new Mid WACH C Division finished 15-3-1 qualified for the Division 2 Central Tournament.

In 2011, the Tyngsboro High girls cross country team captured the Division 2 championship in the Central Massachusetts Cross Country Meet held on November 12, 2011 at the Gardner Municipal Golf Course. The girls have repeated as Central Massachusetts State Divisional Champions in 2012, 2013, and 2014 and finished 8th, 2nd, 3rd, and 6th in consecutive Massachusetts All State Championship appearances.

The girls cross country team continued their success by winning the Central Massachusetts State Division 2 Championship in 2015 and 2016. This was their 5th and 6th straight titles.
