= South Shore Vocational Technical High School =

South Shore Technical High School
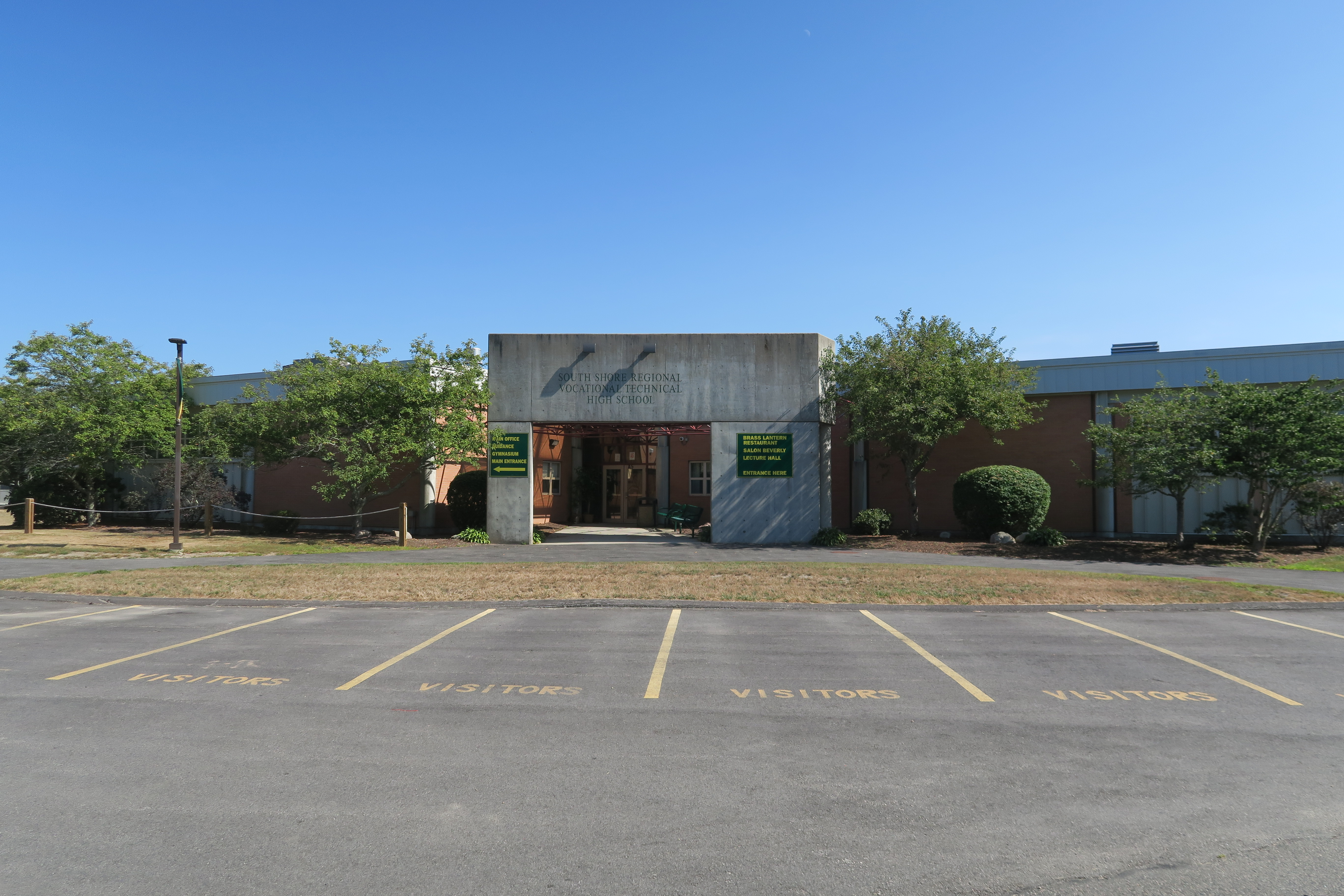

Location
- 476 Webster St., Hanover, Massachusetts 02339; United States; 42°08′52″N 70°51′48″W

Information
- Type: Public
- Superintendent: Thomas Hickey
- Principal: Sandra Baldner
- Grades: 9–12
- Enrollment: 600
- Campus: Suburban
- Colors: Green, Gold & White
- Mascot: Viking
- Newspaper: Valhalla Times(discontinued)
- Budget: $13,581,366 total $21,947 per pupil (2016)
- Communities served: Abington, Cohasset, Hanover, Hanson, Marshfield, Norwell, Rockland, Scituate, Whitman
- Website: http://southshore.tech

South Shore Technical High School is a public high school located in Hanover, Massachusetts, United States. The school serves about 690 students in grades 9 to 12. The schools district code is 08730000. The school itself is located near the Hanover/Norwell village of Assinippi, as it educates students from the towns of Cohasset, Hanover, Marshfield, Norwell, Scituate, Hanson, Rockland, Whitman, Abington, and other Plymouth County towns.

== Vocational Shop Programs ==
South Shore Technical currently offers 12 shop programs to students, which are as follows:

- Allied Health
- Automotive
- Carpentry
- Computer Information Technology (CIT)
- Cosmetology
- Culinary Arts
- Design and Visual Communications (DVC)
- Electrical
- Manufacturing Engineering Technology (MET)
- Horticulture
- Heating, Ventilation, Air Conditioning & Refrigeration (HVAC-R)
- Metal Fabrication

== Technical Competitions ==
Each year, students at South Shore Technical have the opportunity to participate in various technical competitions. For example, students in the Horticulture program have the opportunity to participate in Future Farmers of America competitions. Students enrolled in all other technical programs may participate in SkillsUSA which hosts district, state, and national competitions between technical schools for students to show what they have learned.

== Sports ==
South Shore Technical Currently offers the current sports:

- Baseball
- Basketball
- Cross Country
- Football
- Golf
- Hockey
- Soccer
- Track and Field- Outdoor
- Volleyball
- Wrestling
- Swim and Dive
