= Greater New Bedford Regional Vocational-Technical High School =

Greater New Bedford Regional Vocational Technical High School
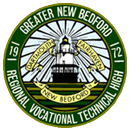

Location
- 1121 Ashley Boulevard; New Bedford, Massachusetts 02745; United States; 41°41′25.67″N 70°56′14.42″W

Information
- Type: Vocational Technical
- Established: 1977
- Superintendent: Michael Watson
- Teaching staff: 190.88 (FTE)
- Grades: 9–12
- Enrollment: 2,151 (2024-2025)
- Student to teacher ratio: 11.27
- Colors: Green & Gold
- Nickname: Bears
- Budget: $41,628,420 total $19,667 per pupil (2016)
- Communities served: New Bedford, Dartmouth, Fairhaven
- Executive Director for Operations and Compliance: Robert Watt
- Principal: Warley Williams III
- Website: www.gnbvt.edu

Greater New Bedford Regional Vocational-Technical High School (commonly referred to as GNB Voc-Tech, Voc-Tech, or Voc) is a vocational high school located in New Bedford, Massachusetts, United States for students in grades 9–12. The school draws its student body from the towns and cities of New Bedford, Dartmouth, and Fairhaven. It is considered its own school district, thus having an on-site superintendent as well as an academics principal and a vocational-technical principal. Students alternate between six day long career technical and academic cycles.

Students at GNB Voc-Tech experience an education which blends academic instruction with career and technical education. They can choose from more than two dozen career majors. In a typical class, 60-70% of its graduates choose to continue their education, either at colleges or advanced technical schools. Another 30-35% enter the workforce and approximately 2% enter the armed services. GNB is the largest vocational-technical high school in the state by enrollment.

== Vocational-Technical Programs ==
Greater New Bedford Regional Vocational Technical High School offers more than 30 Career and Technical Programs that students can choose from. These career and technical programs are divided into academies based on industry or group of industries.

== Athletics ==
- Girls softball 2022 state champions
- Baseball - MIAA Division ll State Champions (2017)

- 2016 Massachusetts Large School State Vocational Champions

- Football - Massachusetts Vocational Large State Champions (2010, 2011)
- Boys Soccer - MIAA Division I South Sectional Champions (2011)
  - Massachusetts Vocational Large State Champions (2004, 2005, 2006, 2007)
- Girls Volleyball - Massachusetts Vocactional Large State Champions (2010, 2011)
- Boys Volleyball - MIAA Division II Eastern Mass. State Champions (2004, 2006)
- Boys Volleyball - MIAA Division I Eastern Mass. State Champions (2009)
- Girls Basketball - MIAA Division IV South Sectional Champions (2012), D-IV State Finalists (2013, 2013))
  - Massachusetts Vocational Large State Champions (2010, 2011, 2012)
