= Greater Lowell Technical High School =

Coordinates: 42°39′13″N 71°23′10″W

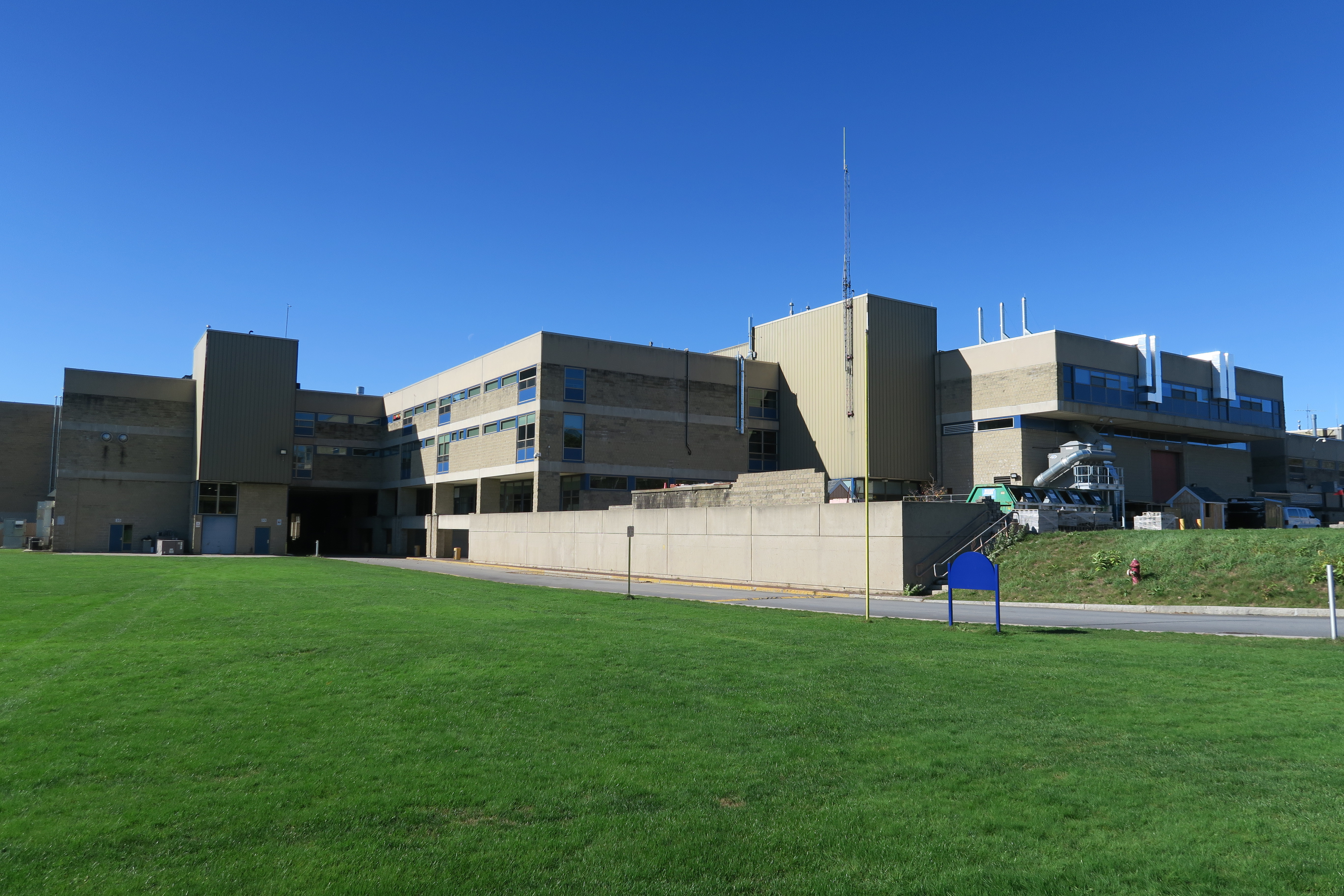

Location
- 250 Pawtucket Boulevard; Tyngsborough, Massachusetts 01879; United States

Information
- Type: Public
- Opened: 1967
- CEEB code: 221220
- NCES School ID: 250548002268
- Teaching staff: 212.53 (FTE)
- Grades: 9–12
- Enrollment: 2,314 (2023-2024)
- Student to teacher ratio: 10.89
- Colors: Blue & Gold
- Athletics conference: Commonwealth Athletic Conference
- Mascot: Gryphon
- Communities served: Lowell, Dracut, Tyngsborough, and Dunstable
- Website: https://www.gltech.org/

Greater Lowell Technical High School is a public regional vocational technical high school located in Tyngsborough, Massachusetts, United States; part of the Greater Lowell area. The school was founded in 1967 as the Lowell Trade School and later became Greater Lowell Regional Vocational Technical High School. The name was again changed to Greater Lowell Technical High School. The school serves the City of Lowell and the towns of Tyngsborough, Dracut, and Dunstable. Local nicknames for the school include “The Voke”, "GLTech", and "GLTHS."

There are 23 career and technical programs available for students to choose from during their freshman year at the school.

== Demographics ==
The race/ethnicity of the 2,302 students enrolled for the 2022–2023 school year is:

- African American - 7.6%
- Asian - 20.0%
- Hispanic - 33.4%
- Native American - 0.2%
- White - 35.0%
- Multi-Race, Non-Hispanic - 3.8%

The selected populations for the 2,302 students enrolled for the 2022–2023 school year are:

- First Language not English - 23.6%
- English Language Learner - 7.9%
- Low-income- 48.7%
- Students with Disabilities - 16.2%
- High Needs - 61.0%
