= S. Wesley Haynes =

American architect

Stephen Wesley Haynes
- Born: 1892; Fitchburg, Massachusetts, US
- Died: 1983 (aged 90–91)
- Occupation: Architect
- Buildings: Randall Hotel, Gardner Court House, Community Memorial Hospital, Uxbridge High School, Latchis Hotel, Saugus High School, East Longmeadow High School, Lincoln-Sudbury Regional High School, North Andover High School
- Design: Calvin Coolidge College

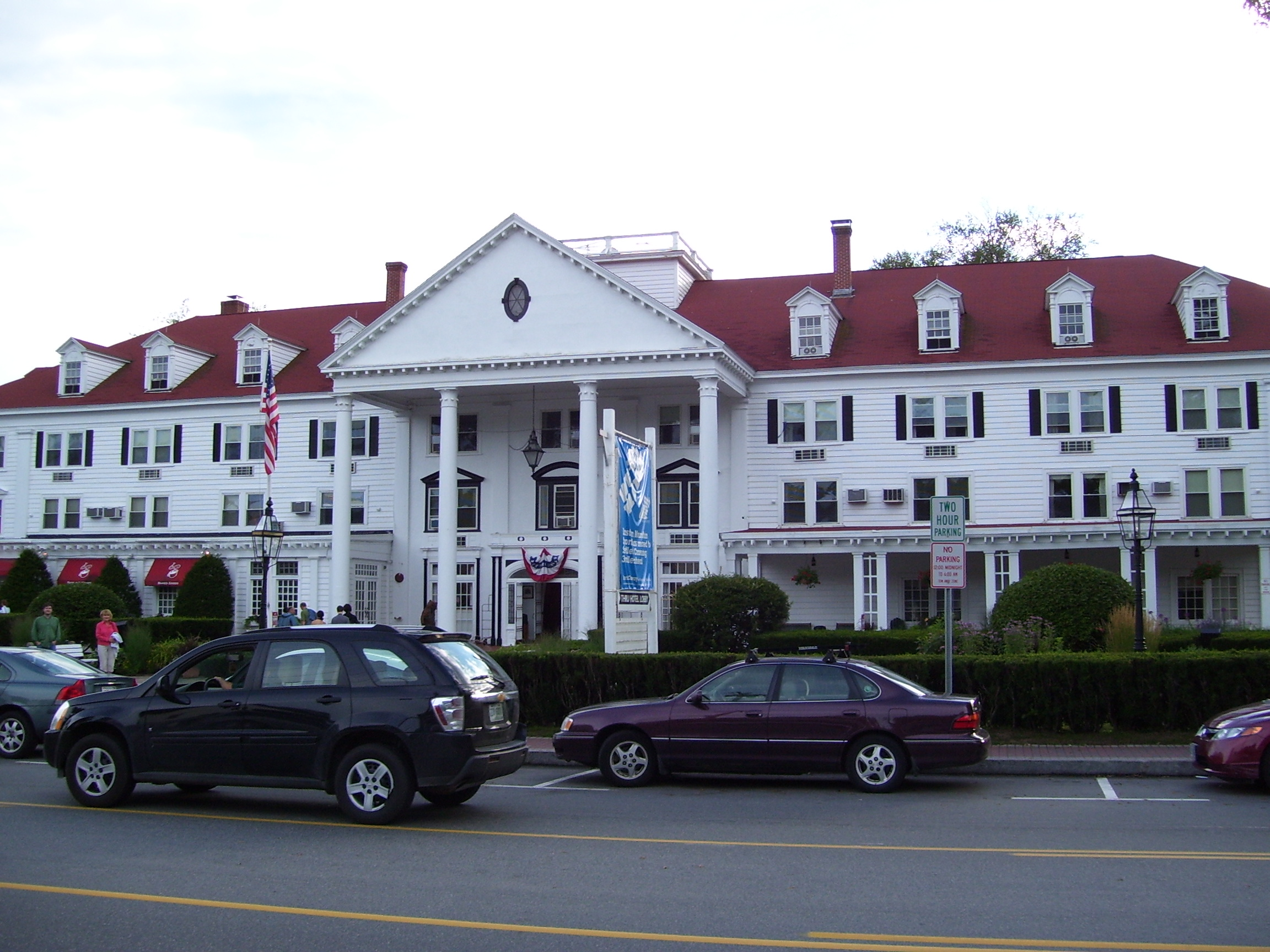
Randall Hotel, North Conway, 1923.

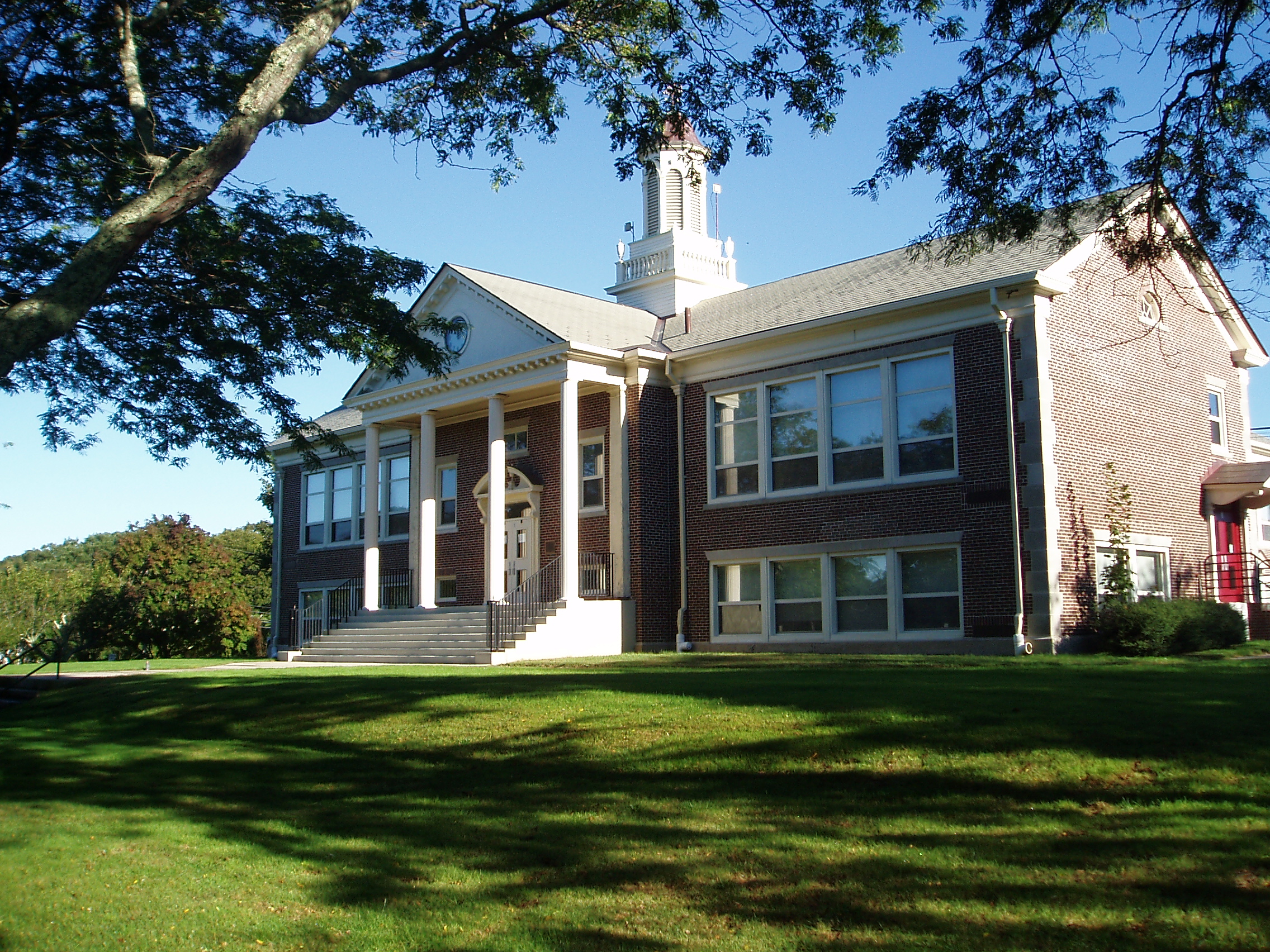
Teaticket School, Falmouth, 1927.

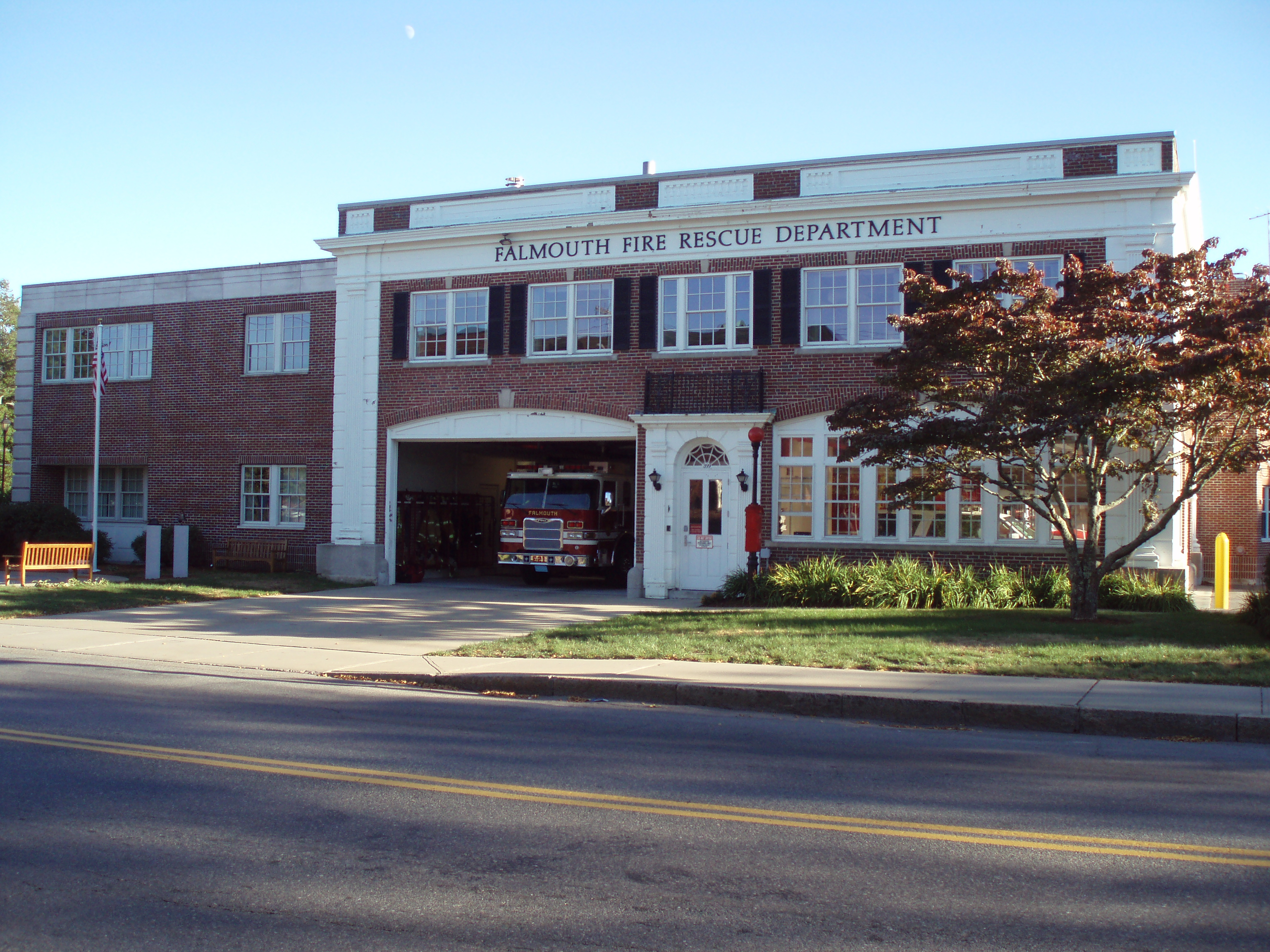
Central Fire Station, Falmouth, 1929.

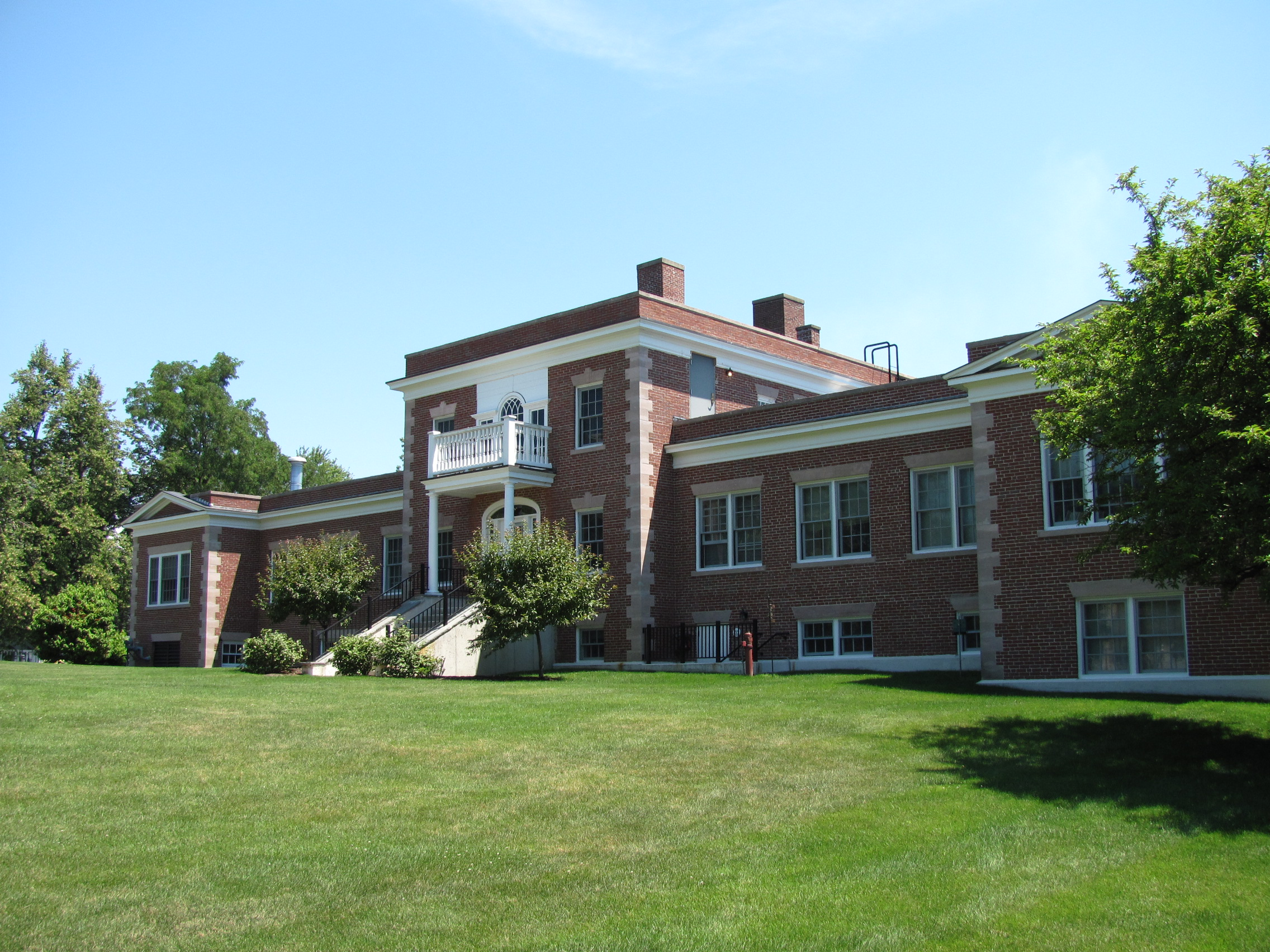
Community Memorial Hospital, Ayer, 1929.

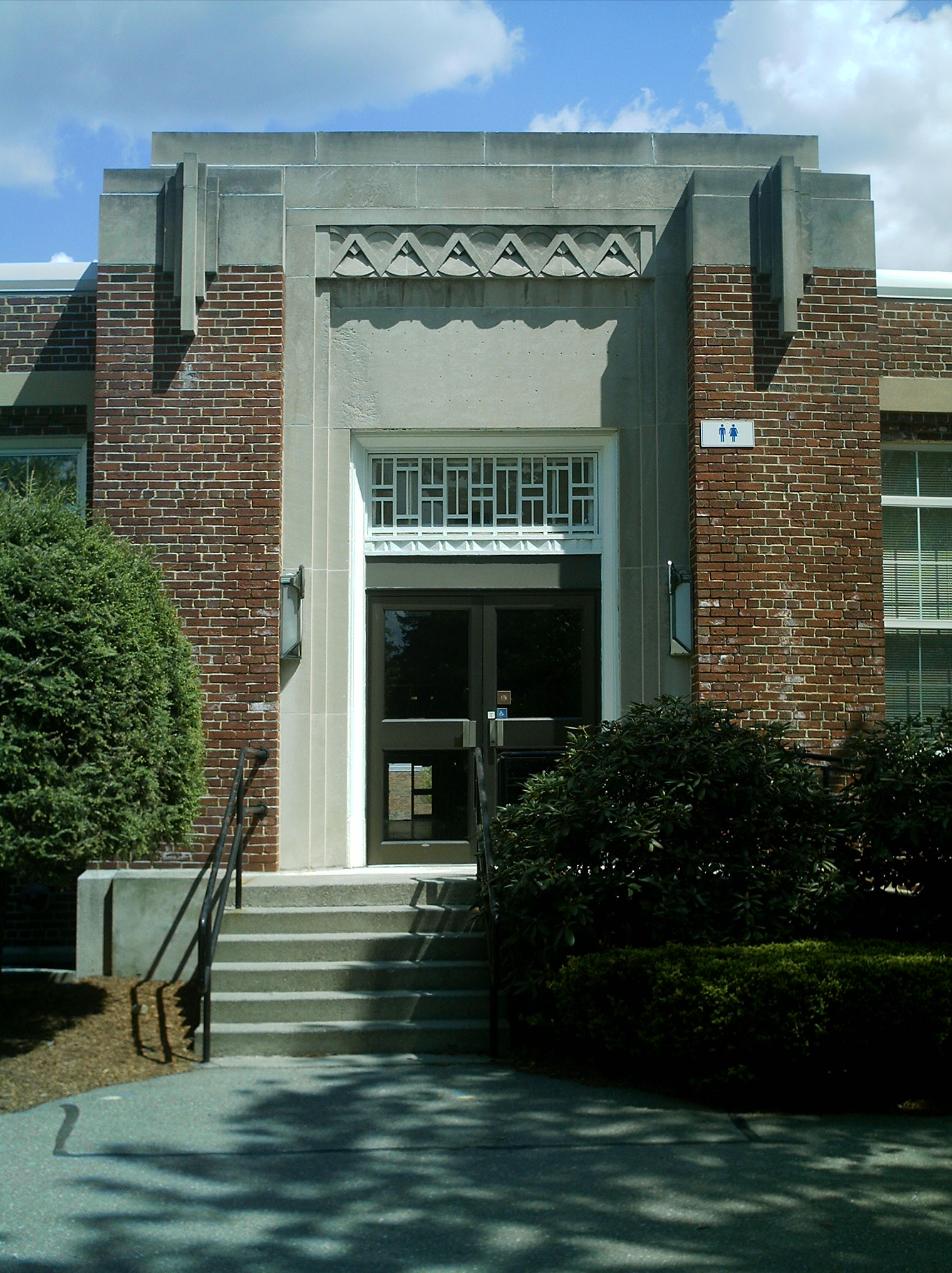
Anthony Building, Fitchburg State University, 1934.

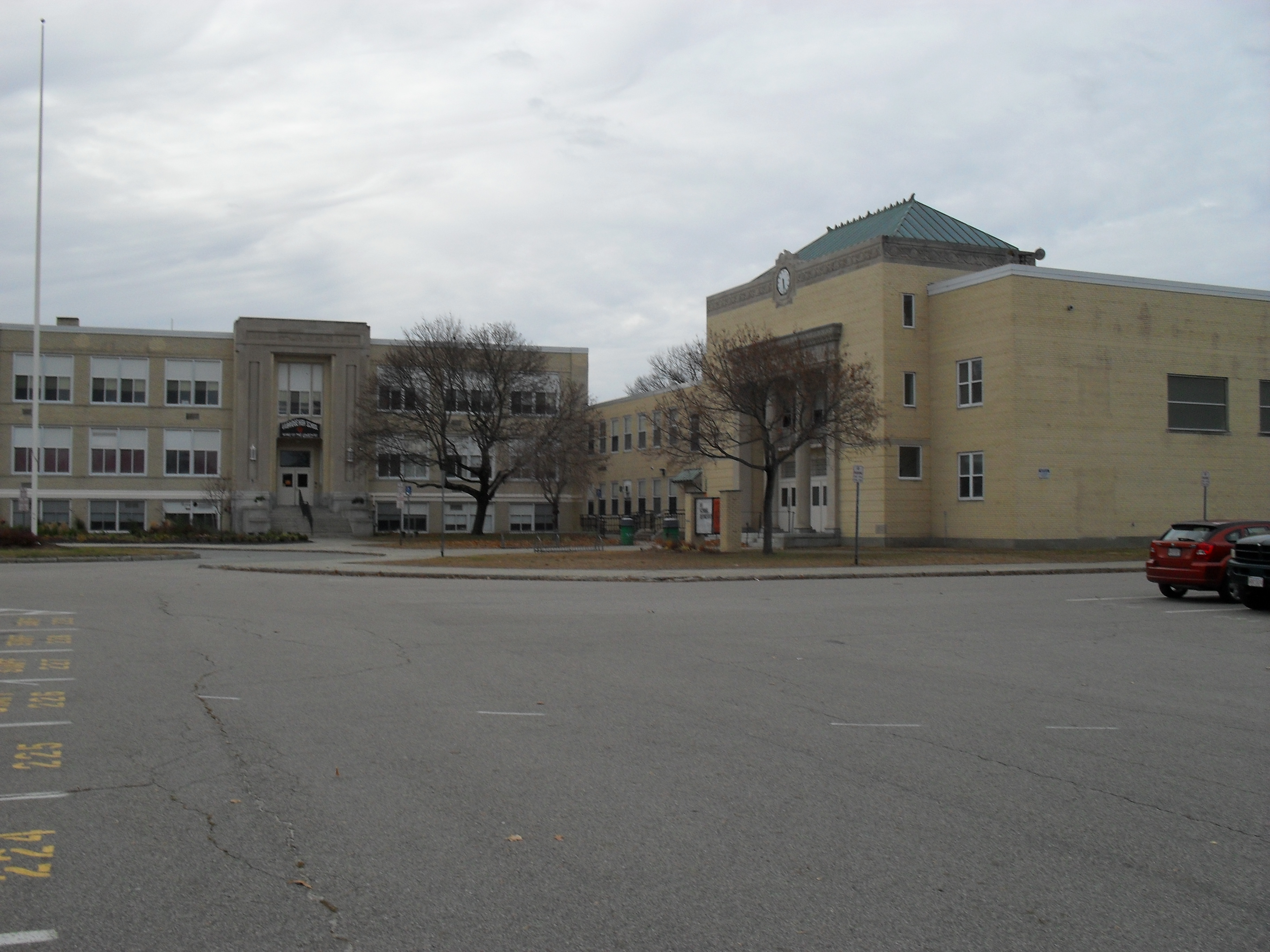
High School, Uxbridge, 1935.

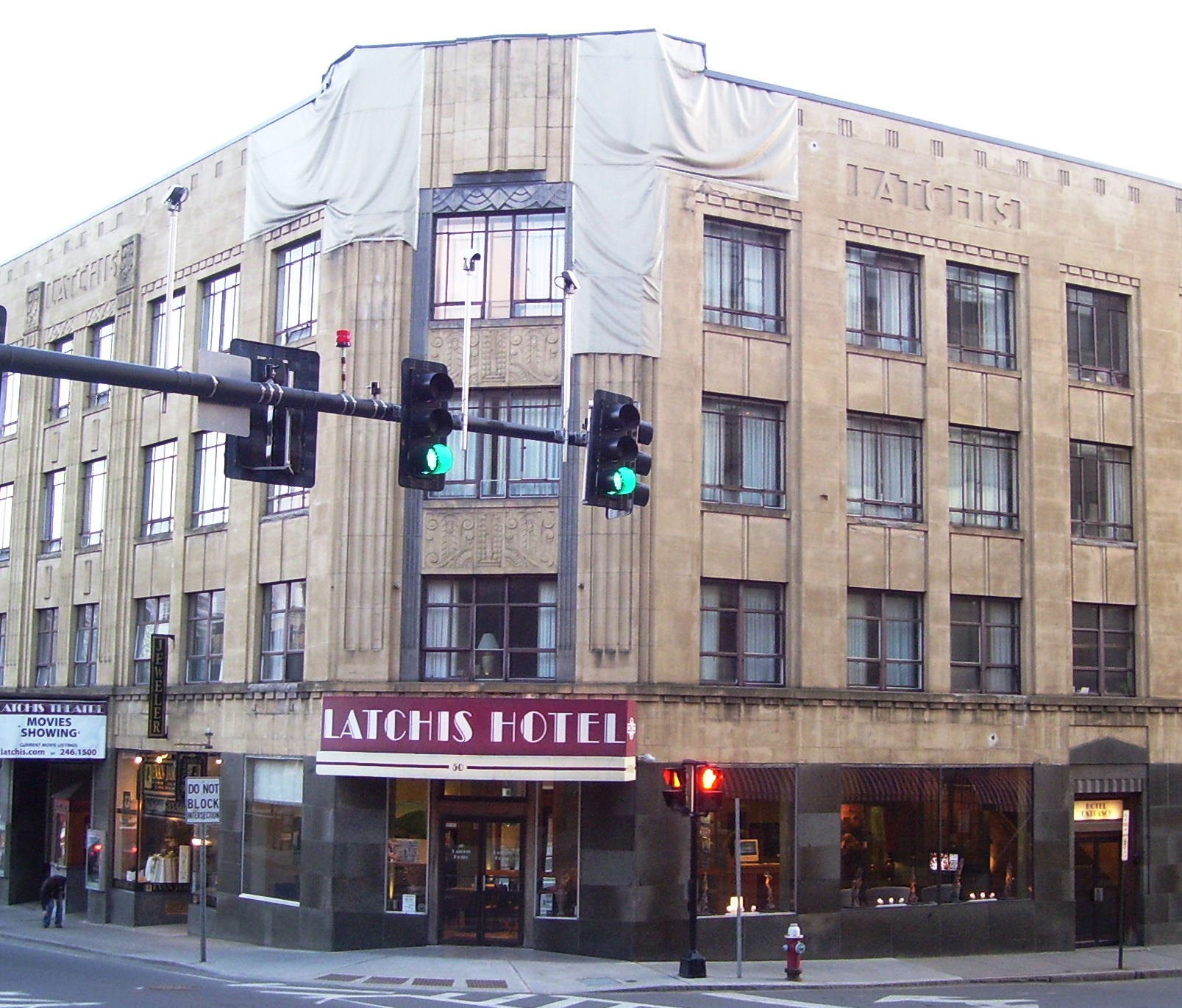
Latchis Hotel, Brattleboro, 1938.

S. Wesley Haynes (1892–1983) was an American architect from Massachusetts.

== Life ==
Wesley Haynes was born in Leominster in 1892. He attended the schools in that town, later moving to Boston to continue his education there. He worked as a draftsman for Peabody & Stearns, Allen & Collens, and others. In 1918 he returned to Leominster to open his own office, moving it to Fitchburg in 1920. In 1921 he and Harold E. Mason, an architect formerly of Keene, New Hampshire, formed a partnership, Haynes & Mason. By 1932 Mason was working semi-independently from an office in Leominster, and in 1933 they split completely. Haynes then established the firm of S. W. Haynes & Associates, which remained active until 1962. Upon the new year, the firm was reestablished as Haynes, Lieneck & Smith. Haynes died in 1983, but the office, relocated to Ashby in the 1980s, remains active.

He designed buildings in Massachusetts, New Hampshire, Vermont, and Connecticut, several of which have been placed on the National Register of Historic Places.

== Architecture ==
For the first decade and a half of his career, Haynes primarily designed his buildings in the Colonial Revival style. He designed a number of major buildings in this style, including the Community Memorial Hospital and the Randall Hotel. After 1935, he switched to the Art Deco style, though only briefly. In this style, he designed the Anthony Building on the Fitchburg State campus, the high school at Uxbridge, and the Latchis Hotel in Brattleboro, Vermont. After the beginning of the war he gradually transitioned to the International Style, thus embracing modernism. His Burbank Hospital School of Nursing dates from this period, as is the Peter Noyes School in Sudbury.

For the rest of his career, his and his firm's works were in the Modernist manner. Large educational complexes of this era include the high schools at Saugus, East Longmeadow, Lincoln-Sudbury Regional, and North Andover. Some of Haynes' schools departed from their stripped-down aesthetic to include some more expressive detail, as at Mendon's former Nipmuc Regional High School, and at the fire station in Shirley. These details were probably due to the influence of Paul Lieneck.

In 1966 the office had the chance to design one last major Colonial Revival-influenced work. Calvin Coolidge College, a small Boston school associated with the New England School of Law, had decided on a move out of the city to rural Ashburnham. However, the plans fell through, and the school ceased operations in 1968. The proposed site is today a residential subdivision.

== List of works ==
=== S. W. Haynes, 1918-1921 ===
- 1919 - Pierce School (Remodeling), 593 Main St, Leominster, Massachusetts

=== Haynes & Mason, 1921-1933 ===
- 1923 - Randall Hotel, 2760 White Mountain Hwy, North Conway, New Hampshire
- 1927 - Teaticket School, 340 Teaticket Hwy, Falmouth, Massachusetts
- 1928 - Gardner Court House, 115 Pleasant St, Gardner, Massachusetts
- 1928 - Groton High School, 145 Main St, Groton, Massachusetts
- 1928 - Nashoba Cold Storage Warehouse, 81 Central Ave, Ayer, Massachusetts
- 1929 - Central Fire Station, 399 Main St, Falmouth, Massachusetts
- 1929 - Community Memorial Hospital, 15 Winthrop Ave, Ayer, Massachusetts
- 1929 - Springfield High School (Remodeling), Park St, Springfield, Vermont
- 1930 - Middle Haddam School, 12 Schoolhouse Lane, Middle Haddam, Connecticut. "“School Building Inspection Reports.” Connecticut State Archives, Connecticut State Library. Education, Department of, 1845-1997 (RG 010) Box 8. School Building Inspection Reports. Folder – East Hampton.
- 1931 - Shepardson School, Whittemore Rd, Middlebury, Connecticut
- 1933 - Rye School, Washington Rd, Rye, New Hampshire. *1933 Horace C. Hurlbutt Jr School Weston, Ct

=== S. W. Haynes & Associates, 1933-1962 ===
- 1934 - Anthony Building, Fitchburg State University, Fitchburg, Massachusetts
- 1935 - Abington High School, 1071 Washington St, Abington, Massachusetts
- 1935 - Stonington High School, Field St, Pawcatuck, Connecticut
  - Highly altered
- 1935 - Uxbridge High School, Capron St, Uxbridge, Massachusetts
- 1938 - Latchis Hotel, 50 Main St, Brattleboro, Vermont
- 1938 - Center School, 65 Thaxter Ave, Abington, Massachusetts
- 1938 - New Braintree School, Utley Rd, New Braintree, Massachusetts
- 1938 - North School, 171 Adams St, North Abington, Massachusetts
- 1939 - Maj. Howard W. Beal Memorial High School (Old), 1 Maple Ave, Shrewsbury, Massachusetts
- 1945 - Burbank Hospital School of Nursing (The Highlands), 335 Nichols St, Fitchburg, Massachusetts
- 1946 - Lancaster Memorial School (Old), 39 Harvard Rd, Lancaster, Massachusetts
- 1946 - Bryn Mawr Elementary School, Swanson Rd, Auburn, Massachusetts
- 1948 - F. W. Woolworth Building, 430 Main St, Fitchburg, Massachusetts
- 1949 - Peter Noyes Elementary School, 280 Old Sudbury Rd, Sudbury, Massachusetts
- 1951 - Birchland Park Junior High School, Mapleshade Ave, East Longmeadow, Massachusetts
  - Demolished
- 1952 - Acton High School (Old) and Blanchard Auditorium, 16 Charter Rd, Acton, Massachusetts
- 1953 - Saugus High School, Pearce Memorial Dr, Saugus, Massachusetts
- 1953 - Terminal, Fitchburg Municipal Airport, Fitchburg, Massachusetts
- 1956 - East Longmeadow High School, Maple St, East Longmeadow, Massachusetts
- 1957 - Lincoln-Sudbury Regional High School, 390 Lincoln Rd, Sudbury, Massachusetts
  - Demolished in 2004
- 1957 - Southbridge High School (Old), 25 Cole Ave, Southbridge, Massachusetts
  - A substantial enlargement of the former Cole Trade School
- 1958 - Nipmuc Regional High School (Old), 148 North Rd, Mendon, Massachusetts
- 1959 - Georgetown High School, Winter St, Georgetown, Massachusetts
- 1960 - Norwell High School (Old), 328 Main St, Norwell, Massachusetts
  - Demolished

=== Haynes, Lieneck & Smith, 1963-1983 ===
- 1964 - Crown Point Office Center, 76 Summer St, Fitchburg, Massachusetts
  - Originally built in 1940 as Fitchburg General Hospital, closed 1964
- 1968 - Shirley Fire Station, 8 Leominster Rd, Shirley, Massachusetts
- 1970 - Frances Drake Elementary School, 75 Viscoloid Ave, Leominster, Massachusetts
- 1971 - North Andover High School, 430 Osgood St, North Andover, Massachusetts
  - Demolished in 2004
