= East Longmeadow High School =

Location
- 180 Maple Street; East Longmeadow, Massachusetts 01028; United States; 42°03′31″N 72°31′22″W

Information
- Type: Public
- Established: April 28, 1959
- School district: East Longmeadow Public Schools
- Principal: Frank Paige
- Teaching staff: 68.16 (FTE)
- Grades: 9 - 12
- Student to teacher ratio: 11.31
- Colors: Red and gray
- Athletics: Baseball, basketball, cheer, cross country, field hockey, football, golf, ice hockey, lacrosse, soccer, softball, ski, swim, tennis, track & field, volleyball, and wrestling
- Athletics conference: Division 2
- Mascot: Spartan
- Rival: Longmeadow High School
- Newspaper: Spartan Spectator
- Variety show: Spartanum Spectaculuum
- Website: sites.google.com/eastlongmeadowma.gov/east-longmeadow-high-school-we/home

East Longmeadow High School is a public high school located in East Longmeadow, Massachusetts, United States. It is the only secondary school (high school) in the East Longmeadow School District. It enrolls 833 students. On November 7, 2023, the residents of East Longmeadow voted in favor of a debt exclusion which will allocate funds to build a brand new high school and pool. The project is expected to begin in summer of 2024, with the goal of the new building being ready for the 2026-2027 school year.

== History ==
After a strenuous process, the plans for a high school building to be constructed at 180 Maple Street (previously farmland) were approved by the voters. Ground was broken on the construction of a building to house the town's growing student body on April 28, 1959. Following one year's construction and several finishing touches, East Longmeadow High School first opened its doors to students on September 13, 1961, graduating its first class in the summer of 1962. Prior to an addition to the existing building in 1965, only one class had attended the school for all four years (Class of 1964). This was due to accommodation issues due to sizing. Ninth graders continued to attend Birchland Park Middle School until the addition was complete. As of June 2023, 12,762 students have graduated from the original school building. The largest number of graduates to date was 298 in the class of 1974.

=== Principals ===
- Elwin J. Doubleday, 1960-1963 (died 2004)
- Ralph L. Shindler, 1963-1979 (died 2014)
- Peter J. Cannone, Jr., 1979-1987 (died 2020)
- Richard L. Freccero, 1987-2010
- Michael E. Knybel, 2010-2011
- Gina E. Flanagan, 2011-2020
- Frank R. Paige, 2020–present.

== New school building ==
From 2014-2019, the East Longmeadow School Committee submitted Statements of Interest for grant funding through the Massachusetts School Building Authority (MSBA) to build a new school building. The old building has been experiencing severe deterioration of mechanical systems along with constant roof leaks. The district was accepted into the core program in 2019. A feasibility study was completed which recommended a complete demolition of the old building and reconstruction of a new school building. The Town of East Longmeadow held a special election on November 7, 2023 with 2 questions on the ballot. Question 1 asked voters to approve funding for a new school building through a proposition 2 1/2 debt exclusion, and Question 2 asked voters to approve funding for a new pool which will be attached to the high school. The town voted strongly to approve both the school and pool projects with 3,577 (68.9%) voting yes and 1,617 (31.1%) voting no for the school and 3,219 (62.3%) voting yes and 1,948 (37.7%) voting no for the pool. The budget for the school project was set at $177,500,000 while the pool project budget is set at $16,910,000. Construction will begin in summer of 2024 with the new building being open for the 2026-2027 school year. The project will ultimately be completed sometime in 2027.

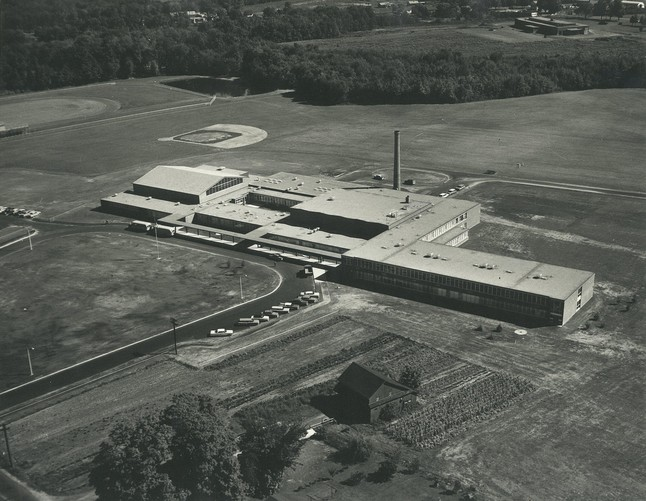
East Longmeadow High School shortly after it opened.

== Notable alumni ==
- Kim Adler, PWBA Hall of Fame professional bowler
- Nick Ahmed, professional baseball player
- Peter Avdoulos, Springfield College diving coach from around 1985 through 2024
- Victoria Aveyard, author of the Red Queen trilogy
- Ken Dilanian, journalist (class of '86)
- Jim Douglas, four-term governor of Vermont
- Kyle Smith (class of 1984), film critic for the Wall Street Journal and novelist
- Admiral Robert F Willard, United States Navy, 22nd Commander, US Pacific Command
