= East Longmeadow School District =

School district in Massachusetts

Address
- 180 Maple Street East Longmeadow, Hampden County, Massachusetts, 01028; United States

District information
- Grades: K-12
- Superintendent: Gordon C. Smith
- Schools: 5

Students and staff
- District mascot: Spartan
- Colors: Red & Gray

Other information
- Website: www.eastlongmeadowma.gov/377/District-Information

The East Longmeadow School District is a public school district serving the town of East Longmeadow, Massachusetts.

== Schools & Administrators ==
It includes the following schools:

- East Longmeadow High School (opened 1959)
  - Mr. Frank Paige, Principal
  - Mr. Gary Wright, Assistant Principal
  - Mrs. Anne Blain, Assistant Principal
- Birchland Park Middle School (built 2000)
  - Mr. Steve Pearson, Interim Principal
  - Ms. Natalie Ojunga-Andrew, Interim Assistant Principal
- Mapleshade Elementary School (opened 1955)
  - Mr. Conor Martin, Principal
- Mountain View Elementary School (opened 1961)
  - Ms. Elaine Santaniello, Principal
- Meadow Brook Elementary School (opened 1969)
  - Ms. Renee Lodi, Principal
  - Ms. Lauren Shea, Assistant Principal

== Decommissioned Schools ==
The following four schools were decommissioned:

- Center School (opened September 1889, closed February 14, 1969).
- Pleasant View Elementary School (opened 1916, closed June 29, 1976)
- Birchland Park Middle School (opened 1951, demolished 2000)
- East Longmeadow High School (opened September 7, 1960, Industrial Arts wing demolished in April 2026, the rest between June 24th and early July 2026)
