= Peter Avdoulos =

American diver

Biographical details
- Born: circa 1964; East Longmeadow, Massachusetts
- Education: Springfield College

Playing career
- 1981–1985: Springfield College
- Positions: 1-meter, 3-meter Diver

Coaching career (HC unless noted)
- 1984–2024: Springfield College; Diving Coach

Accomplishments and honors

Championships
- 7 National Championships

Awards
- 23 x NEWMAC Diving Coach of the Year; 2005 NCAA Men's Diving Coach of Year; 4 x NCAA Women's Diving Coach of Year; 8 x NE Diving Coach of the Year 1991–2000; 2014 Springfield College Athletic Hall of Fame

Peter Avdoulos is an American former competition diver for Springfield College, who coached the Springfield College Diving team for forty years from 1984 through 2024, leading them to seven national championships. He began his career on a part-time basis when the position became open shortly after his graduation from Springfield.

== East Longmeadow High swimmer ==
Avdoulos was born around 1964 in East Longmeadow, Massachusetts, in the greater Springfield area, where he attended High School. By his Senior year at East Longmeadow High in 1981, Avdoulos had achieved the rare triple achievement of taking top diving honors in Western Massachusetts, Massachusetts state, and New England competitions. At East Longmeadow, Avdoulos was coached by Janet Kerr and with the Springfield Springers Club's David Laing, a former All-American diver at Springfield College, who would later become the Head Diving Coach at Westfield State. In both his Junior and Senior years, Avdoulos won diving titles at the Western Massachusetts Championships. In three successive years as a High School diver at the Massachusetts State Championships, he advanced from fifth to third, and finally first in 1981 as a Senior, also winning the New England title that year. At the New England High School Championships in Gardner, Massachusetts, Avdoulos scored on a forward two-and-a-half tuck, a reverse one-and-a-half, and a forward one-and-a-half with a full twist, becoming only the second East Longmeadow diver to win the New Englands.

== Springfield College swimmer ==
Attending from 1981 to 1985, he competed for Springfield College, where as a Senior he took third in 1 meter diving event at the March 1, 1985 New England Intercollegiate Swimming and Diving Championships, finishing only two points behind the second-place finisher. He also scored well on the 3-meter board. In 1984, Avdoulos was an All-New England selection, and in December trained at London's Crystal Palace, the facility for the English National Team. As an exceptional and consistent performer, he was a recipient of the Charles Batterman Award as the top New England collegiate diver over a four-year period. The Batterman Award was named in honor of Charles Batterman, a long serving MIT diving coach, national champion, author, and pioneer in using the principals of physics in the analysis of dives. At Springfield, he was coached by John Bransfield, who Avdoulos credits both with improving his diving, and making him aware of how to best coach the sport.

== Coaching diving ==
Avdoulos never fully left the diving program at Springfield. After graduating in 1985 with a business degree, and beginning work in the area, the diving coach position was eliminated by the university. After work, Avdoulos would stop by and help coach his former teammates who were without a coach. Though he wasn't fully recognized as Head diving coach in 1990, Avdoulos began coaching the team as early as 1986 on a part-time basis, and has remained as diving coach since then.

During his tenure as diving coach, he led his teams to seven national championships. Outstanding swimmers he coached during his tenure include four-time All-American Mike Shaw, the first national title winner at Springfield, and eight-time All-American Lindsay Moore. Other national title holders include Nora Kelly Westkott, an NCAA Division III Diver of the Year and a winner of the Charles Batterman Award for diving and eight-time NCAA All-American Alison Mellage Campise, a 2003 graduate.

Avdoulos's strengths can best be expressed by his swimmers and fellow coaching professionals. His High School Coach David Laing has said of Avdoulos, "Every diver that enters his program (at Springfield) leaves with not only a great and highly successful diving experience, but also that they have been part of an unbelievable, fun and educational environment.” Maintaining a thirty-year correspondence, Avdoulos's coach at Springfield, John Bransfield has said of Avdoulos, "He is unwavering in his personal convictions and his dedication to doing things right. Springfield College and the sport of diving have been fortunate to have his service". Avdoulos believes his primary objective in coaching is to bring out the best in each of his divers by appreciating their unique character and building on their strengths. He has stated in interviews, that “I may not have achieved everything I wanted in my diving career, but I think that’s what makes me a better coach because I want everyone else to live up to their potential beyond what they think their potential is.” Avdoulos's high achieving Springfield swimmer Jen Thompson has said “Just seeing him believe in me, I suddenly began to believe in myself,” she said. “I’m so much more of a confident athlete now. He’s the first coach that’s really taken the time to sit and discuss our personal goals, discuss what we want, and really taken an interest in us as people [to] help us get there”.

=== Honors ===
Avdoulos's honors are broad in their diversity and scope and recognize the unique contributions he has made to the sport of diving. In College, he won the Charles Batterman award in 1985 for excellence in his sport, an honor given for consistent excellence over a four-year period. He has been the recipient of the New England Men's and Women's Athletic Conference (NEWMAC) Diving Coach of the Year Award twenty-three times, and was the 2005 NCAA Division III Men's Diving Coach of the Year. Since 1996 he was the NCAA Division III Women's Diving Coach of the Year four times, and has been recognized eight times as the New England Diving Coach of the Year from 1991 to 2000. He was named both the NEWMAC Men's and Women's Diving Coach of the Year for the 2002–2003 season and the 2012 and 2013 campaigns. In recognition of his contributions to diving at the university, he was inducted into the Springfield College Athletic Hall of Fame in 2014. He has also received the rare honor of being selected for the College Swimming & Diving Coaches Association of America's (CSCAA) Centennial Celebration, consisting of the 100 Greatest College Swimming & Diving Coaches of the past 100 years.
