= Eastern Slope Inn =

- U.S. National Register of Historic Places
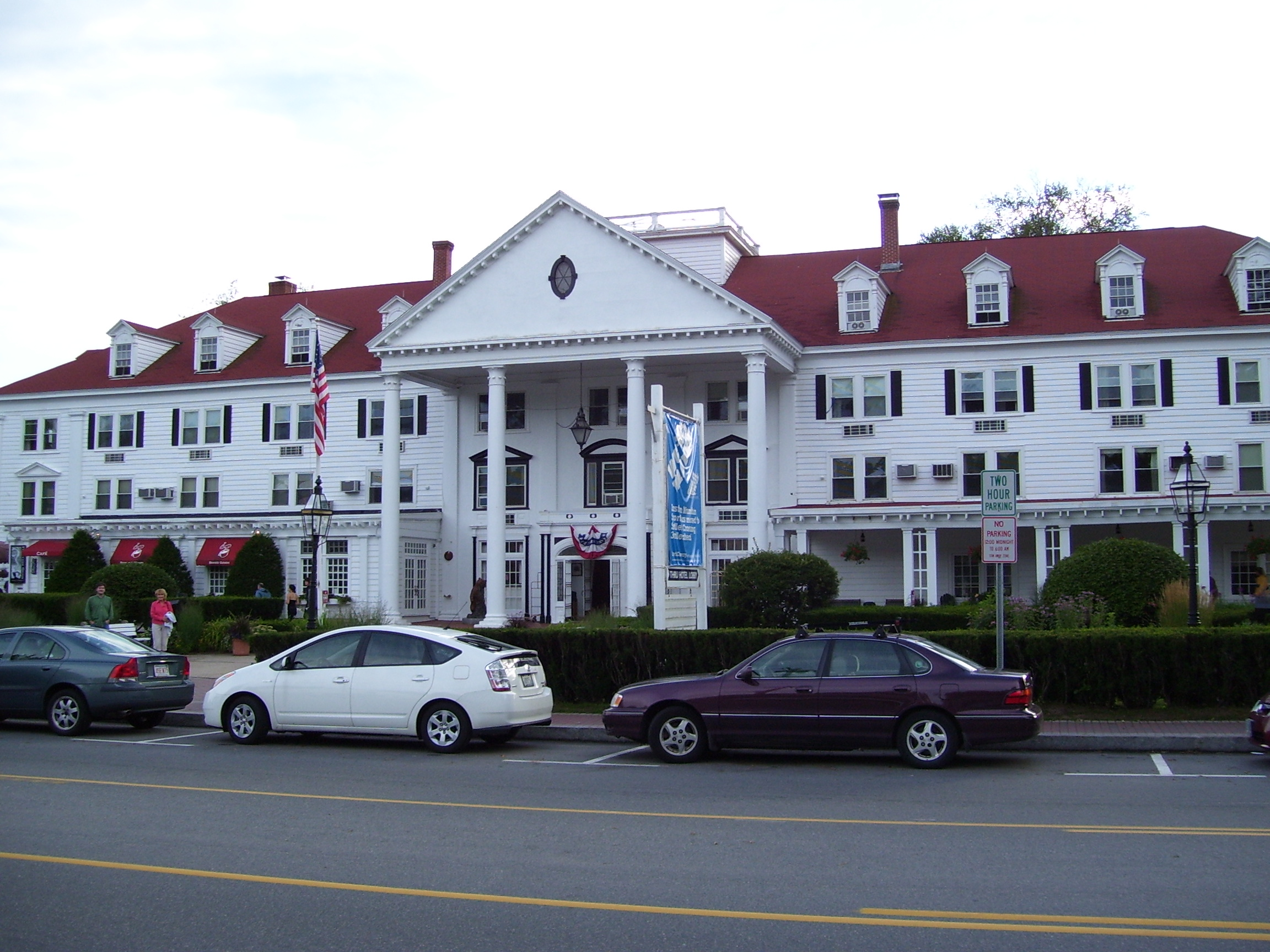

- Location within New Hampshire Location within the United States
- Location: North Conway, New Hampshire
- Coordinates: 44°3′16″N 71°7′49″W
- Built: 1926
- Architect: Haynes & Mason
- Architectural style: Colonial Revival
- NRHP reference No.: 82004994
- Added to NRHP: August 10, 1982

The Eastern Slope Inn is a historic hotel at 2760 White Mountain Highway (U.S. Route 302) in North Conway, Carroll County, New Hampshire. Built in 1926, it is one of the community's most prominent examples of large-scale Colonial Revival architecture, and is historically important as a major element in the popularization of downhill skiing in the area. The inn was listed on the National Register of Historic Places in 1982.

== Description and history ==
The Eastern Slope Inn stands at the northern fringe of the commercial downtown area of North Conway, on the west side of White Mountain Highway, the town's principal thoroughfare. It is a three-story wood-frame structure, with a hip roof crowned at its center by an open widow's walk. A four-column pedimented gable projects at the center of the main facade, and single-story porches extend from it to either side; that on the left has been enclosed. The interior features richly decorated public spaces.

The hotel was built in 1926. It was designed by Harold E. Mason of Haynes & Mason, architects of Fitchburg, Massachusetts, with apparent inspiration from the Mount Vernon estate in Virginia. It was the third hotel on the site, the first two (dating to 1864) having succumbed to fire. Originally the Hotel Randall, it was purchased in 1937 by Harvey Dow Gibson, a native of North Conway, who was by then president of Manufacturers Trust Company of New York. Gibson added the hotel to the Manufacturers Trust's National Hotel Management Company (NMH) range of hotels, which was then overseen by hotel pioneer Ralph Hitz. The hotel was renamed the Eastern Slope Inn as part of a larger effort to promote downhill skiing in the area. Gibson developed the nearby Cranmore Mountain Resort into one of the most successful ski areas of the time, and used the Eastern Slope Inn as a year-round facility.

In 1977 the inn was purchased by Eastern Mountain Sports and converted into a retail establishment. As part of this conversion many of the public spaces were altered to accommodate retail functions. Around 1982 it was sold to an ownership group, which has rehabilitated the property and converted it back into a hotel.

== See also ==
- National Register of Historic Places listings in Carroll County, New Hampshire
