= Latchis Hotel and Theatre =

Movie theatre and hotel in Brattleboro, Vermont, USA

Coordinates: 42°51′05″N 72°33′28″W

Latchis Hotel and Theatre
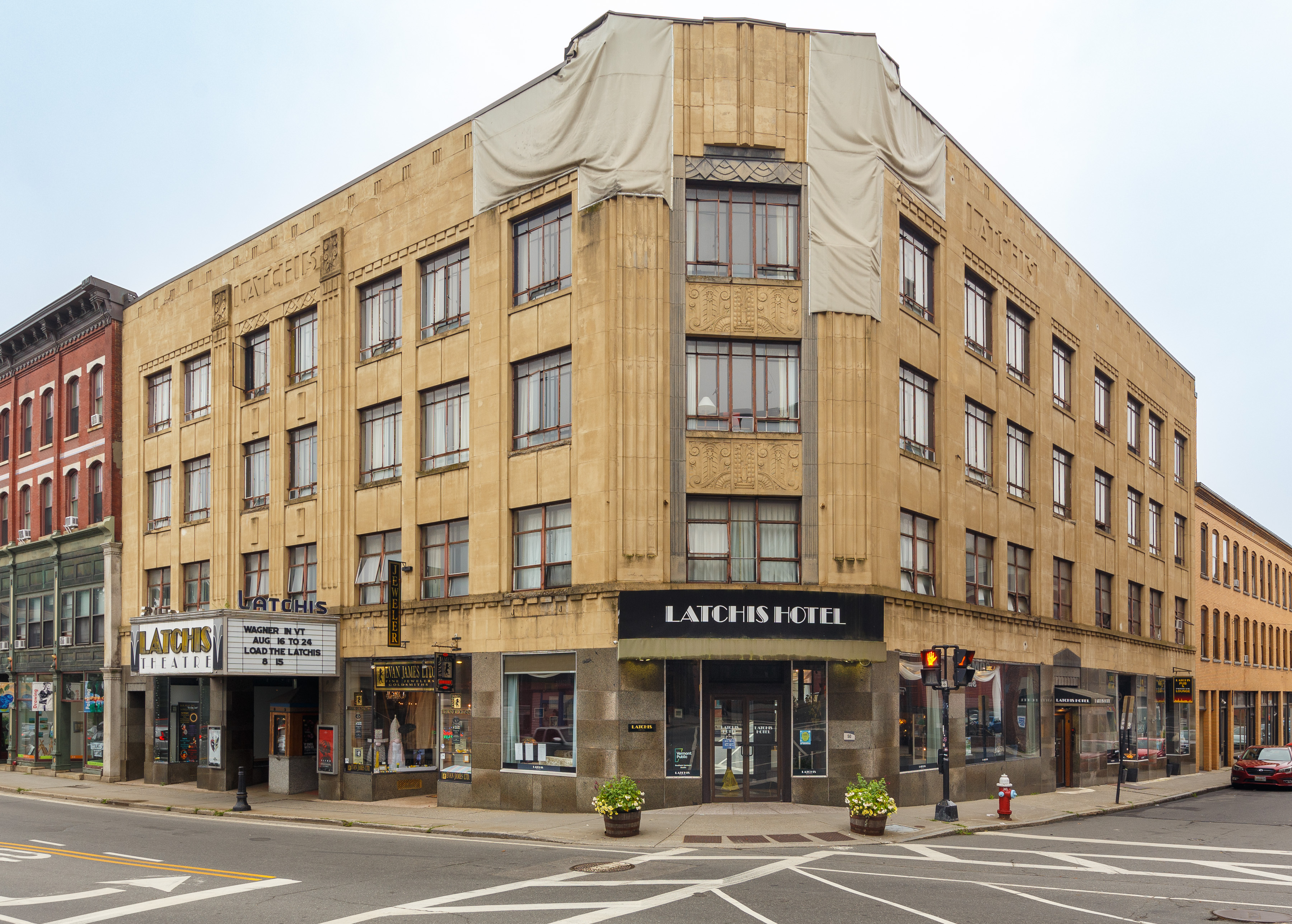
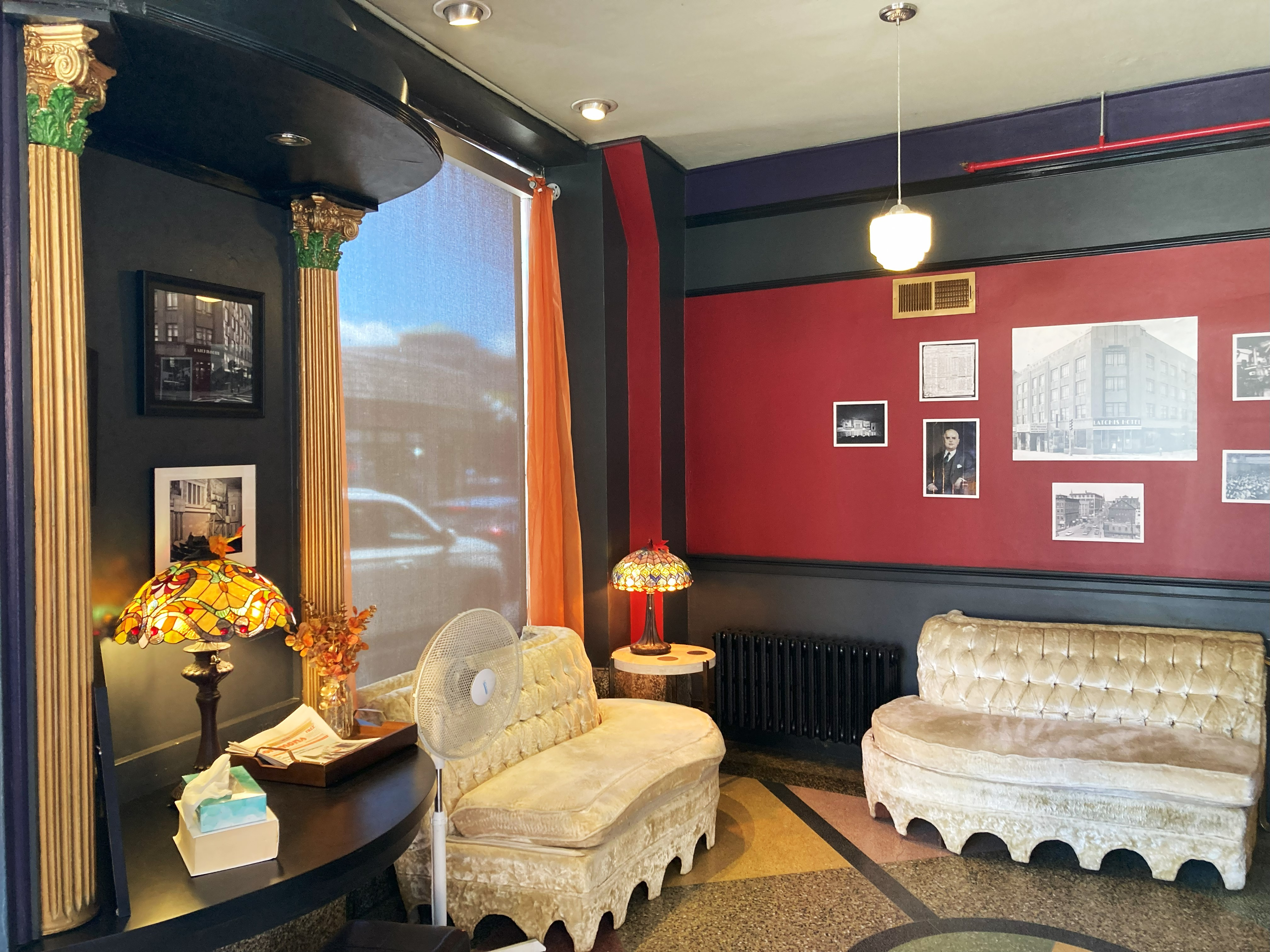
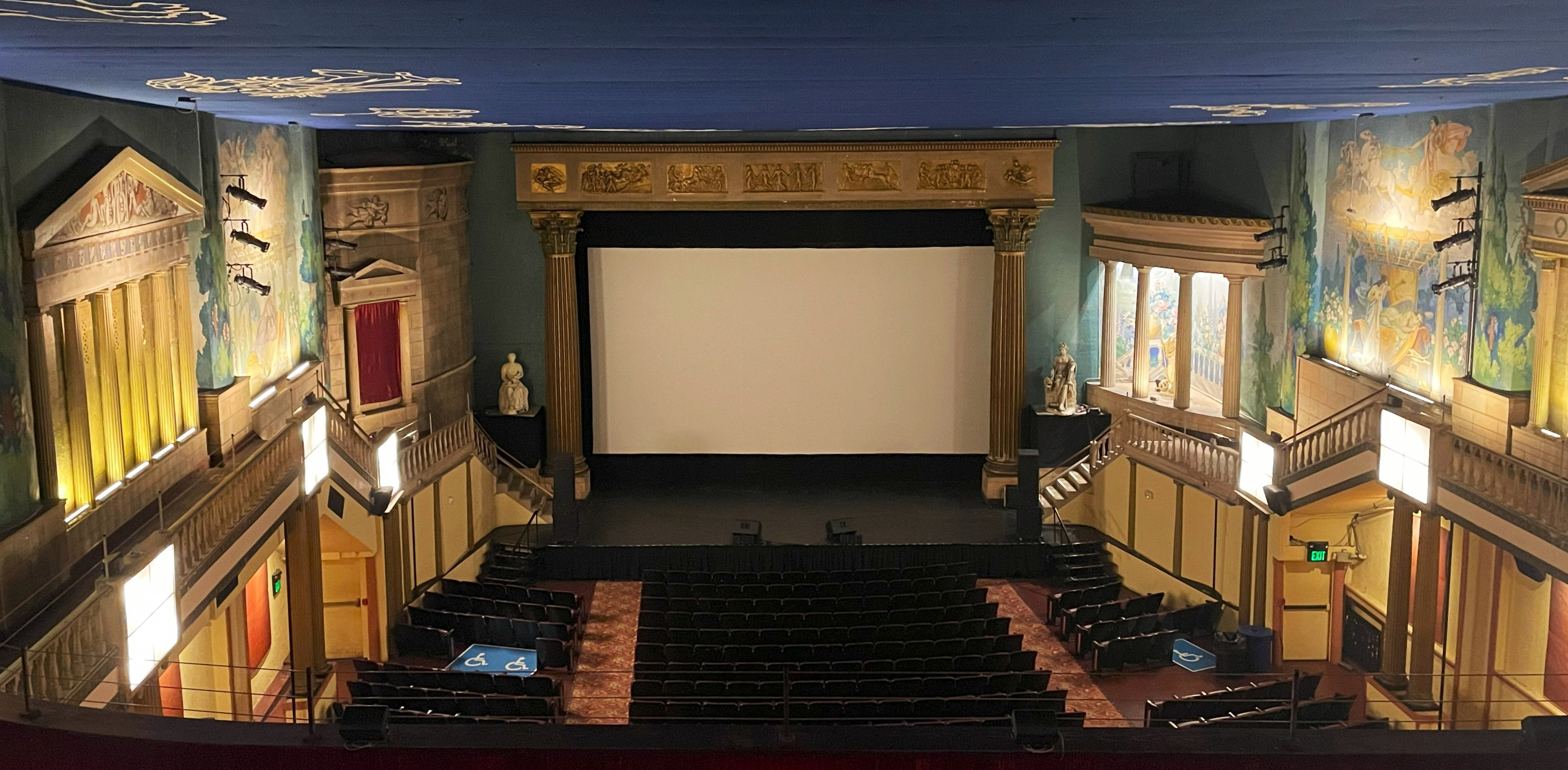

The Latchis Hotel and Theatre (originally the Latchis Memorial Building) is an art deco building in Brattleboro, Vermont, first built in 1938. The building is one of only two extant Art Deco buildings in Vermont. The building is run by the Brattleboro Arts Initiative, a local non-profit.

The building was constructed as a memorial to Demetrius P. Latchis, a Greek immigrant who became an important businessman in Brattleboro, by his sons. Latchis had built a business which ran fourteen theatres throughout New England. The interior include murals and other artwork with Greek mythology, which was created by Hungarian muralist Lajos "Louis" Jámbor. The building also includes terrazzo flooring. The building was designed so that it could include a hotel, theatre, ballroom, restaurant, bar, and other business spaces. The architect for the building was S. Wesley Haynes.

Though a successful business through the 60s, the business slumped in the 70s. In 1985, two children of the original brothers revitalized the hotel. They sold the hotel in 2003 to a local non-profit, the Brattleboro Arts Initiative, created for maintaining the building, bought the hotel for 1.3 million dollars. The money included both local and federal grants. The building suffered considerable damage in 2011, during Hurricane Irene, but was reopened later that year. The building was further restored in 2013, after a half-million dollar fundraising campaign.

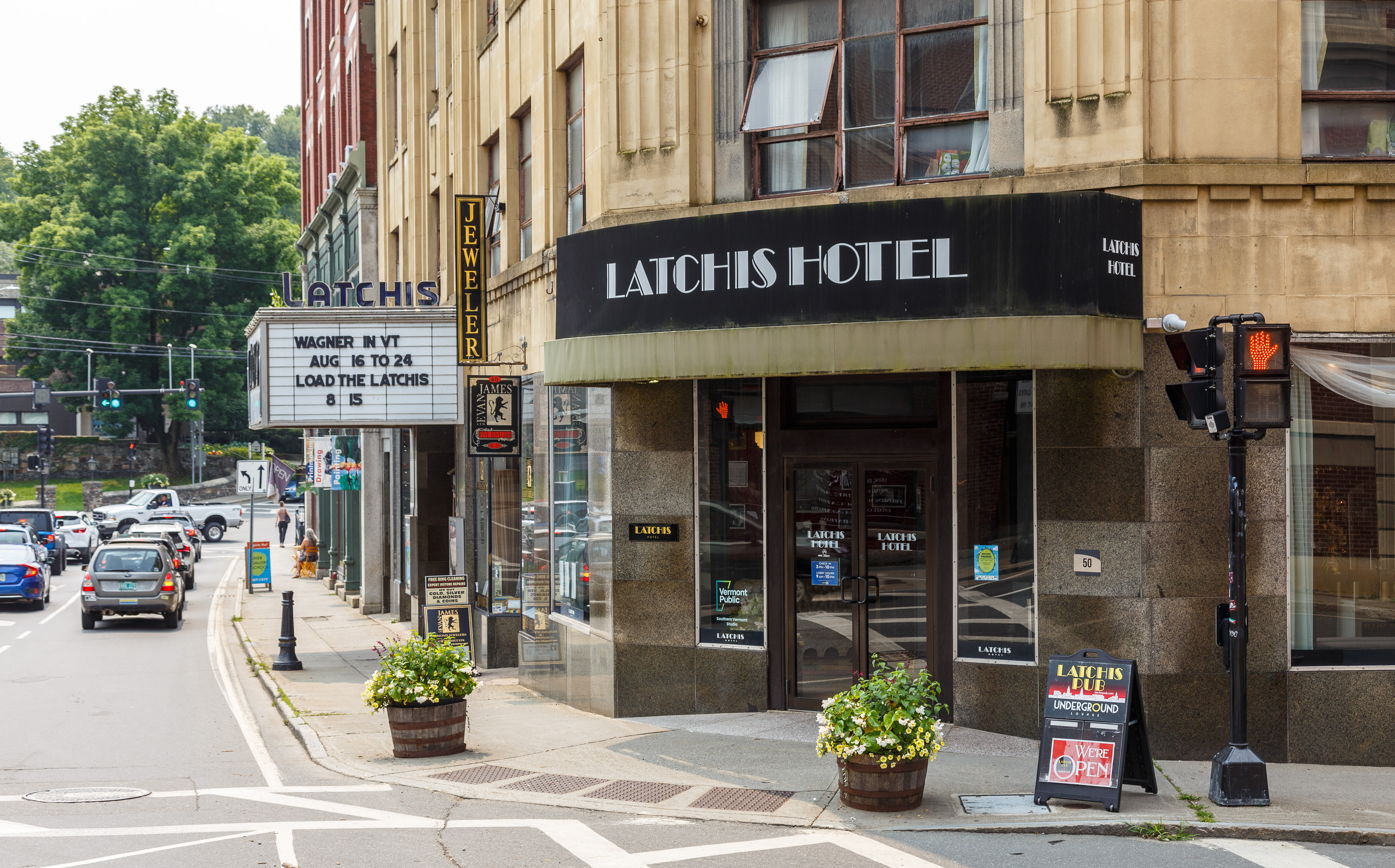

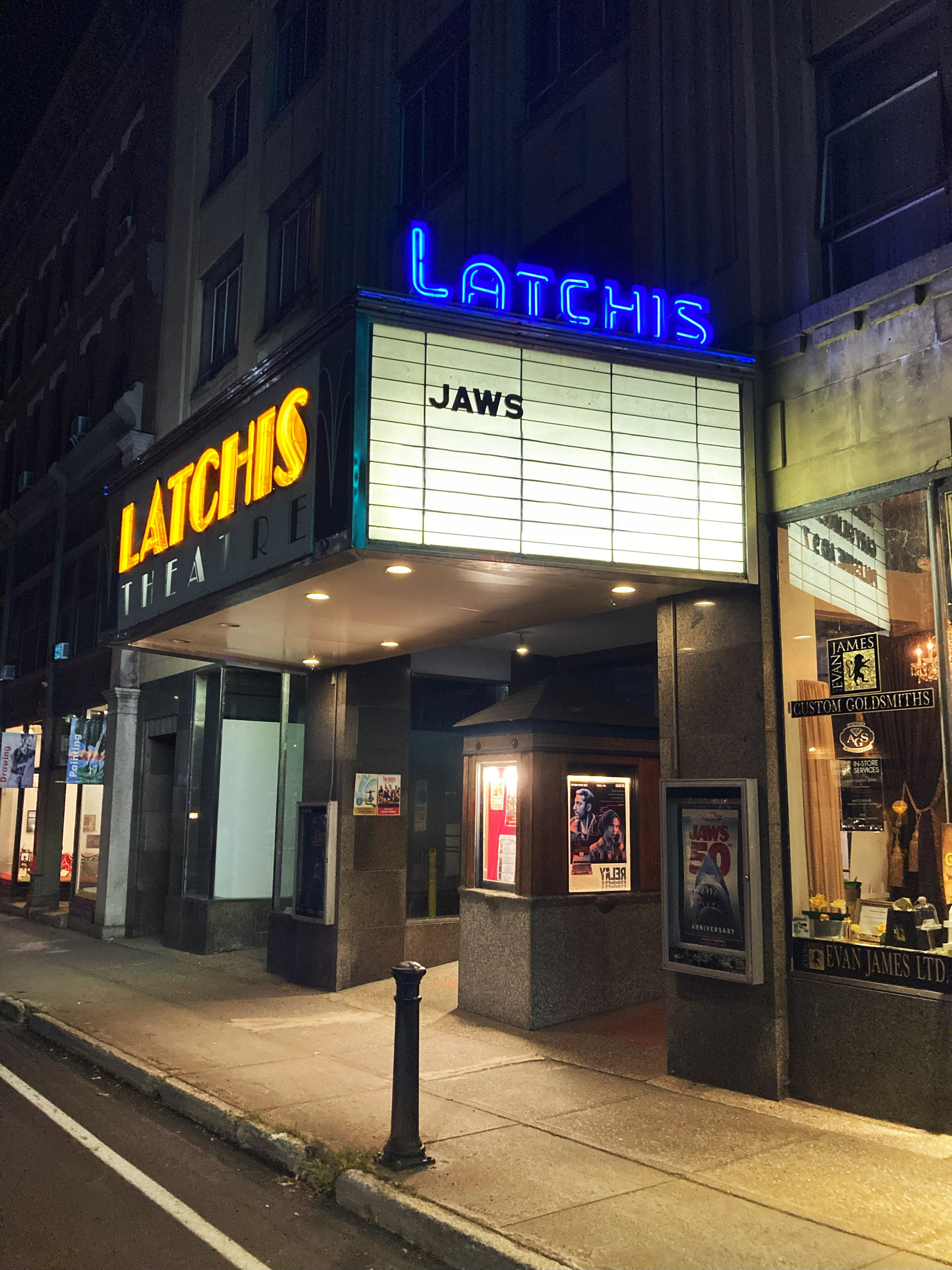

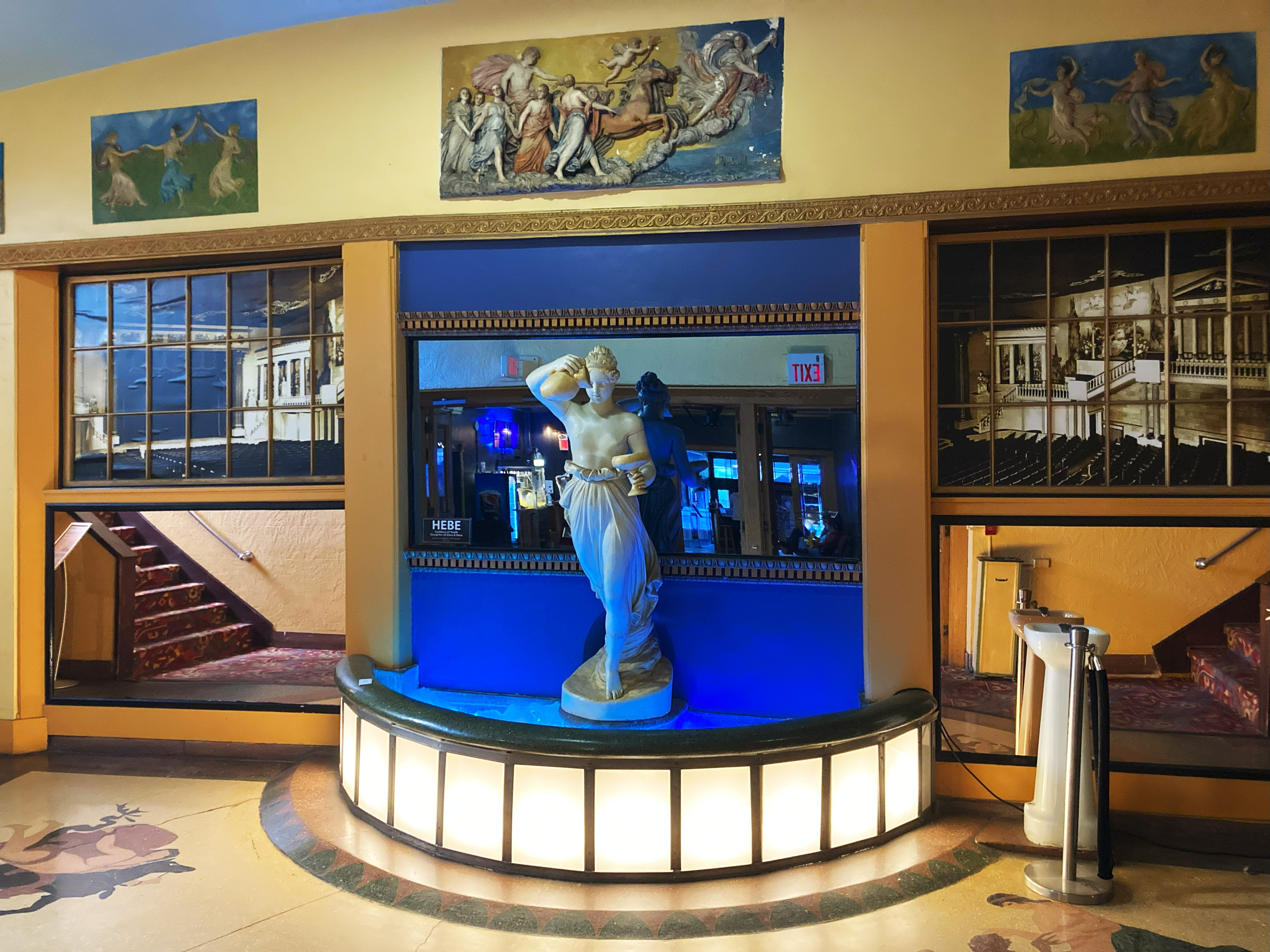
