= Central Fire Station (Falmouth, Massachusetts) =

- U.S. National Register of Historic Places
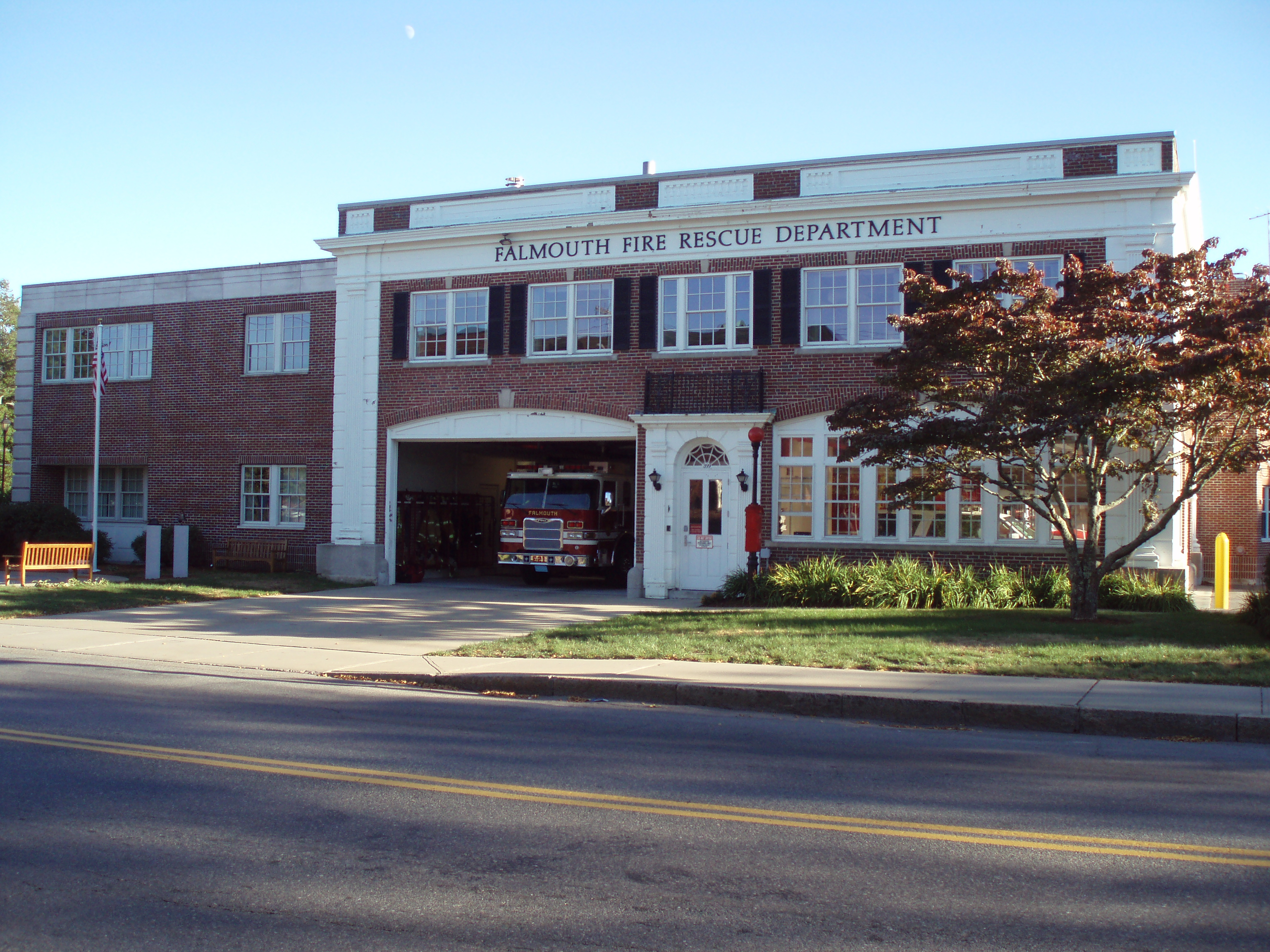
- Central Fire Station

- Location within Cape Cod Location within Massachusetts Location within the United States
- Location: Falmouth, Massachusetts
- Coordinates: 41°33′6″N 70°36′28″W
- Built: 1929
- Architect: Haynes & Mason
- Architectural style: Colonial Revival
- NRHP reference No.: 98000146
- Added to NRHP: February 26, 1998

The Central Fire Station is a historic fire station at 399 Main Street in Falmouth, Massachusetts. The two storey brick building was built in 1929 to a design by Fitchburg architects Haynes & Mason. The brick is laid in Flemish bond, and there are wooden quoins at the corners. The central doorway is flanked by pilasters, and is topped by a fanlight. The flat roof is hidden from view by a low parapet. To the left of the doorway is the main truck bay, and to its right is a group of five sash windows. Both the truck bay and window group are topped by matching low arched finish with keystone.

The building was listed on the National Register of Historic Places in 1998.

== See also ==
- National Register of Historic Places listings in Barnstable County, Massachusetts
