= Lajos Jámbor =

Hungarian-American painter (1884–1954)

- Born: August 1, 1884; Nagyvárad, Austria-Hungary
- Died: June 11, 1954 (aged 69); New York City, United States
- Other names: Jámbor Lajos, Lajos Jambor, Louis Jambor

Lajos "Louis" Jámbor (1 August 1884 – 11 June 1954) was a Hungarian-American post-impressionist painter, illustrator and background artist for animation. He is known for his illustrations for the book Little Women (1947 edition), and his symbolic and religious artwork found murals and as decoration in churches. He also created portraits for New York society.

== Early life and education ==
He was born as Lajos Jámbor in 1884 in Nagyvárad, Kingdom of Hungary, Austria-Hungary (today Oradea, Romania). He attended the Hungarian Royal National School of Arts in Budapest. After graduation he studied religious art in Italy and studied in Düsseldorf, Germany, under Frank Gebhard. Jámbor was elected to the Royal Academy of Arts (RA), before emigrating to the United States in 1923.

== Work ==
=== Painting and murals ===
Lajos Jambor was a muralist, with works in auditoriums, businesses, private estates, and churches of several cities of the United States, particularly Philadelphia and Atlantic City. In 1925, Jambor, working with scenic designer and architect Joseph Urban, painted the patio murals and frescos for Mar-a-lago in Palm Beach, Florida. Jambor painted large panels (circa 1929) above the proscenium in the Atlantic City Municipal Auditorium (now known as Boardwalk Hall) in Atlantic City, New Jersey. Jambor had 26 murals painted (circa 1930) at the Hotel New Yorker at 481 Eighth Avenue in Manhattan, including murals in the ballroom all of which were painted over in 1975 when the hotel purchased and remodeled. Jambor created a 1938 mural based on Greek mythology located in the Latchis Memorial Building in Brattleboro, Vermont. Jambor created work for the St. Stephen of Hungary Church in New York City, which included a painting of the stations of the cross.

Jambor had been the president of the American Artists Professional League (AAPL) at the time of his death in 1954. He formally served as president of the Salmagundi Club, former treasurer of the American Watercolor Society, and a member of Allied Artists of America, and Audubon Artists.

Jambor's work is found in public collections including the Zigler Art Museum, among others.

=== Illustration ===
Jambor illustrated two books by Louisa May Alcott, Little Women (1947 edition, Grosset & Dunlap) and Jo's Boys (1949 edition, Grosset & Dunlap) and his work has been used in later reproductions of these books.

=== Animation ===
Jambor worked for Fleischer Studios as a background artist during the time of traditional hand-drawn animation cels, for the 1939 film Gulliver's Travels.

== Personal life ==
Jambor became a United States citizen in 1929. He was married to Violet E. Czopjak-Jambor and he had two children, a daughter and a son.

In 1934, Jambor had lived at Hotel des Artistes on West 67th Street. At the time of his death he lived in The Colosseum building at 435 Riverside Drive in Manhattan, when this was still a private residential building.

== Controversy ==
Jambor's religious paintings have similarity to Warner Sallman, and scholarly writings allege Jambor appropriated Sallman's artwork and aesthetic. Both artists depicted Jesus as a "strong character" with physical strength, however Sallman was attributed in statement about this as early as 1943, and Jambor was quoted in 1949.

== Death and legacy ==
He died at age 69 on June 11, 1954, at St. Luke's Hospital in Manhattan, due to a heart issue. He is buried in the Princeton Cemetery in Princeton, New Jersey.

Jambor's granddaughter, Katharine Violet Alexander created a five-minute video about her grandfather.
