= Community Memorial Hospital (Ayer, Massachusetts) =

Historic hospital in Massachusetts

Geography
- Location: Ayer, Massachusetts, United States
- Coordinates: 42°33′39″N 71°34′56″W

History
- Constructed: 1929
- Opened: 1927
- Closed: 1971

Links
- Lists: Hospitals in Massachusetts
- Community Memorial Hospital
- U.S. National Register of Historic Places
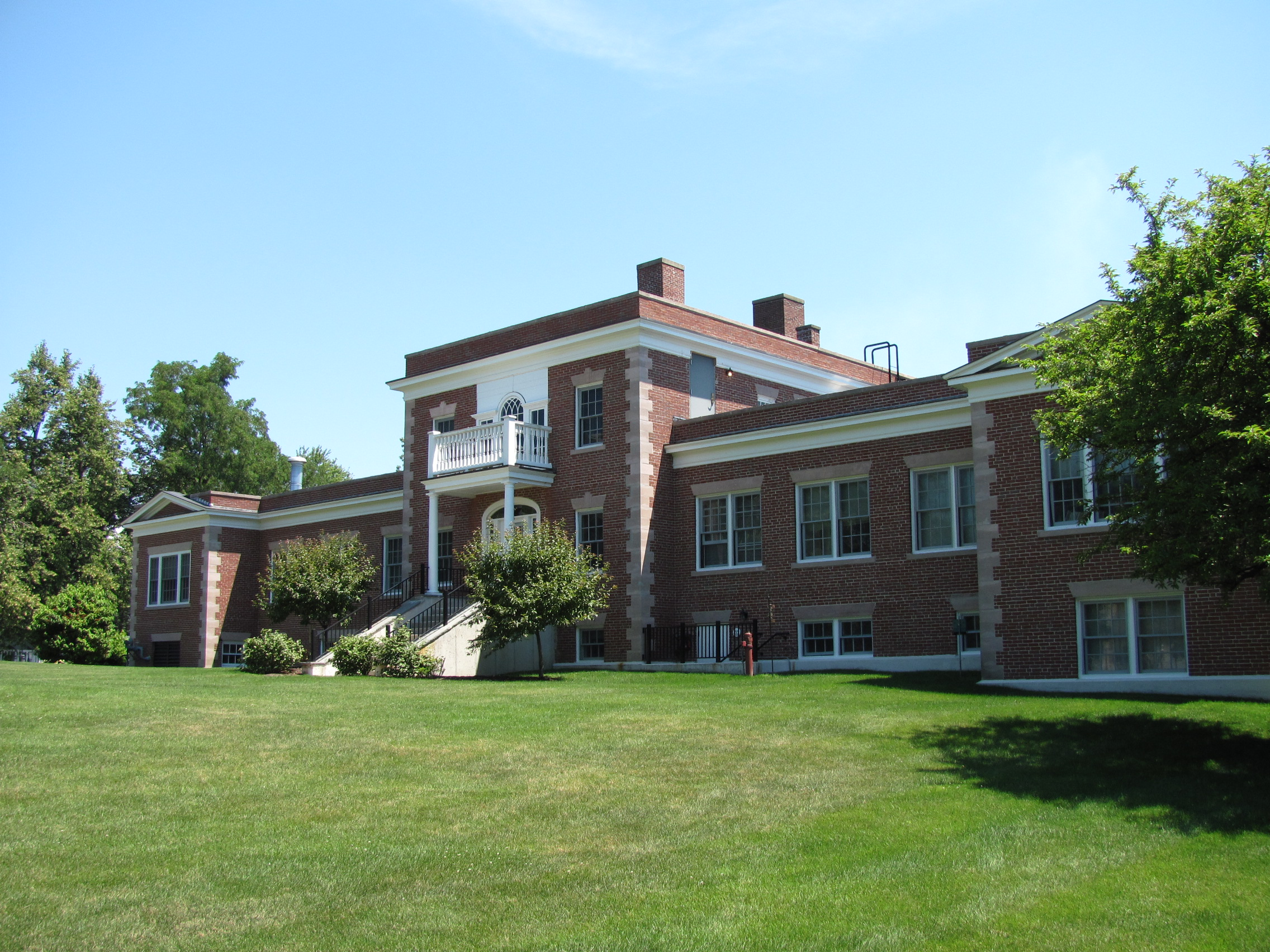
- Community Memorial Hospital

- Location within Massachusetts Location within the United States
- Location: 15 Winthrop Avenue, Ayer, Massachusetts
- Area: 1.85 acres (0.75 ha)
- Built: 1929
- Architect: Haynes & Mason
- Architectural style: Colonial Revival
- NRHP reference No.: 04000423
- Added to NRHP: May 14, 2004

Community Memorial Hospital is a historic hospital building at 15 Winthrop Avenue in Ayer, Massachusetts. The brick and stone Colonial Revival building was constructed in 1929, and expanded in the 1950s. It was designed by the Fitchburg architectural firm of Haynes & Mason, and was the first hospital building dedicated to serving the town of Ayer. The organization that operated the hospital was created in September 1927 when the Ayer Hospital Association, founded in 1912, accepted control of Ayer Private Hospital, founded 1924. This organization operated the facility until 1964 when it was merged with the Groton Community Hospital, forming Nashoba Community Hospital. This group continued to operate the facility until 1971, when it moved to new premises and vacated this building.

The building was listed on the National Register of Historic Places in 2004. As of 2018, the building was being operated as Nashoba Valley Assisted Living.

== See also ==
- National Register of Historic Places listings in Middlesex County, Massachusetts
