= Teaticket School =

- U.S. National Register of Historic Places
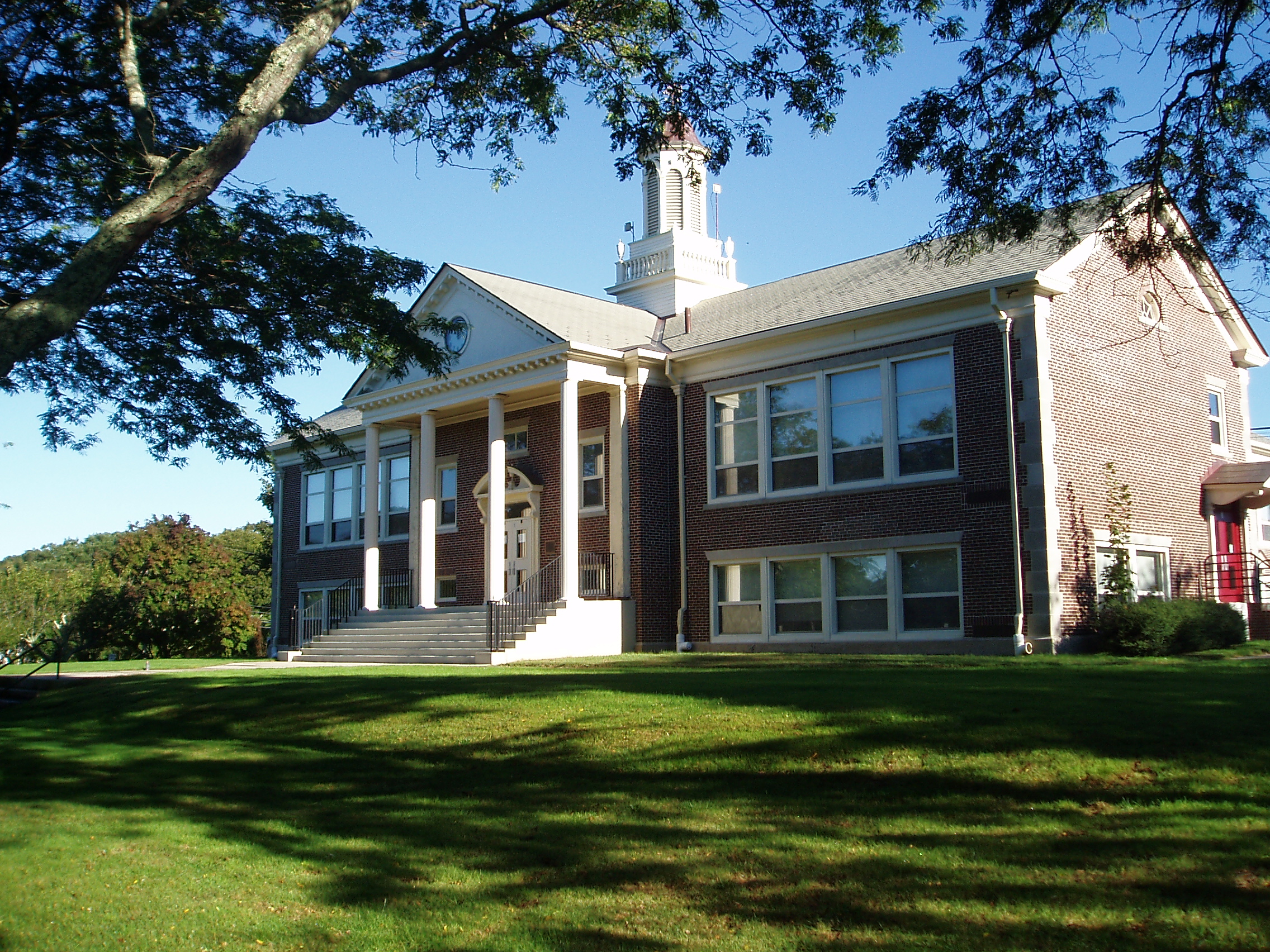

- Location within Cape Cod Location within Massachusetts Location within the United States
- Location: Falmouth, Massachusetts
- Coordinates: 41°34′9″N 70°36′20″W
- Built: 1927
- Architect: Haynes & Mason
- Architectural style: Colonial Revival
- NRHP reference No.: 02000082
- Added to NRHP: February 22, 2002

The Teaticket School is a historic former school building at 340 Teaticket Hwy (Massachusetts Route 28 at Sandwich Road) in Falmouth, Massachusetts. Built in 1927, this large Colonial Revival building was the first consolidated elementary school in the town. It has since 1967 served as the Administration Building for the Falmouth Public Schools. It was listed on the National Register of Historic Places in 2002.

== Description and history ==
The Teaticket School is set on the west side of Massachusetts Route 28, on a roughly triangular lot formed by the junction of that road with Sandwich Road, which forms the western boundary of the property. The southern part of the lot is the former Teaticket Green, a town common established in 1661. The school is a T-shaped masonry structure, oriented to face south, with the projecting section to the north. It is a single-story in height, with an elevated basement, side gable roof, corner quoining, and a projecting entry portico in the center of the south facade. The portico has a fully pedimented and modillioned gable with a round clock face at its center, and is supported by four round columns rising from the entry platform that is accessed by a flight of stairs. The building is crowned by a multi-stage tower that has a square base, octagonal belfry section with louvered sides, and a rounded cupola.

The school was designed by Haynes & Mason of Fitchburg and built in 1927, replacing the town's last one-room school, a portable structure built adjacent to a 1912 schoolhouse elsewhere in Teaticket village. The only large school built prior to this one was the 1919 junior high school building, later the Hall School. This building served as an elementary school and a community meeting space until 1967, when it was adapted to house school administrative offices.

== See also ==
- National Register of Historic Places listings in Barnstable County, Massachusetts
