= East Longmeadow, Massachusetts =

- Town
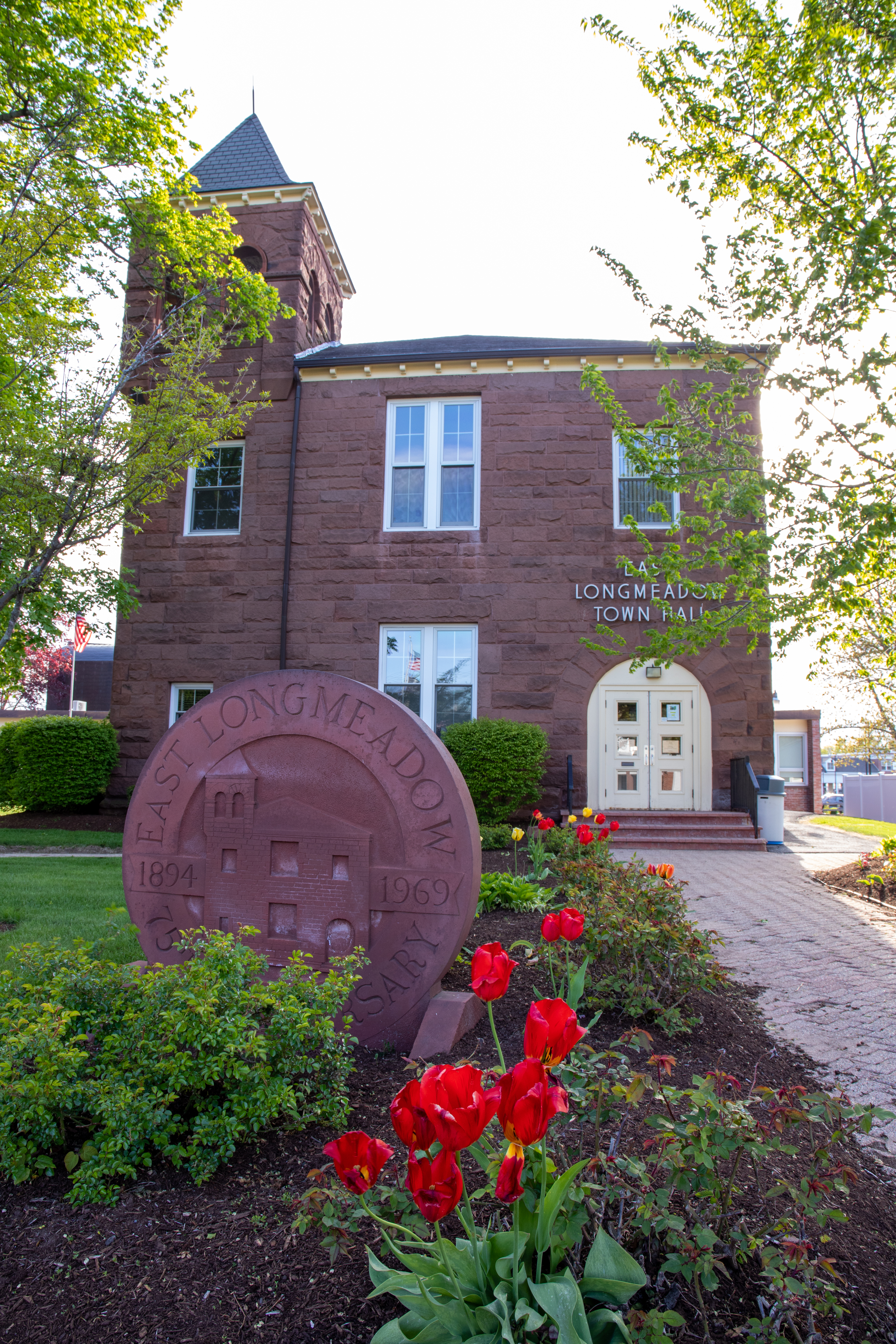
- East Longmeadow Town Hall

- Flag Seal

- Location in Hampden County in Massachusetts
- Coordinates: 42°03′52″N 72°30′47″W
- Country: United States
- State: Massachusetts
- County: Hampden
- Settled: 1720
- Incorporated: 1894

Government
  - Type: Town Council and Town Manager

Area
  - Total: 12.94 sq mi (33.5 km^{2})
  - Land: 13.0 sq mi (33.6 km^{2})
  - Water: 0.039 sq mi (0.1 km^{2})
- Elevation: 226 ft (69 m)

Population (2020)
  - Total: 16,430
  - Density: 1,270/sq mi (489/km^{2})
- Time zone: UTC-5 (Eastern)
  - Summer (DST): UTC-4 (Eastern)
- ZIP code: 01028
- Area code: 413
- FIPS code: 25-19645
- GNIS feature ID: 0618182
- Website: www.eastlongmeadowma.gov

East Longmeadow is a town in Hampden County, Massachusetts, United States, in the Pioneer Valley region of Western Massachusetts. It had a population of 16,430 at the 2020 census. East Longmeadow is 5 mi (8.0 km) southeast of downtown Springfield, part of the Springfield Metropolitan Statistical Area. It is 25 mi (40 km) north of Hartford, 88 mi (142 km) southwest of Boston, and 142 mi (229 km) northeast of New York City.

The development of East Longmeadow around the turn-of-the century was largely reliant on the brownstone quarrying industry. The industry brought many Swedish immigrants, formerly of Connecticut, along with large French and Italian populations to the area. These immigrants typically labored in the quarries.

East Longmeadow hosts an annual Fourth of July Parade, one of the largest Fourth of July parades in Western Massachusetts. East Longmeadow High School also hosts an annual Fourth of July fireworks display, traditionally held on July 3.

== History ==
The town of Longmeadow, Massachusetts was first settled in the 17th century. In the 1750s houses started appearing in the eastern part of the town known as "East Village". In 1894, East Village separated from Longmeadow, and became officially incorporated as East Longmeadow in the same year. The town became well known for its brownstone quarries, even when it was still a part of Longmeadow.

A railroad was built through the town in the late 19th century by Springfield and New London Railroad. The railroad wasn't a part of a major route so it became abandoned by the 1980s. In the early 2010s, a bike path called The Redstone Rail Trail was built on a 1.6 mile section of where the tracks ran. It runs from Maple Street to Denslow Road. In 2020, the old train depot was bought and renovated into an ice cream stand. It opened in spring 2021.

== Sports ==
East Longmeadow and Longmeadow compete in an annual Thanksgiving Day football game that routinely attracts a few thousand spectators. The town is also the home to the 2007 and 2019 Western Massachusetts champions in Varsity High School Baseball, along with the Western Massachusetts champions in Girls Indoor Track in 2010 and 2011.

== Geography ==
According to the United States Census Bureau, the town has an area of 12.94 square miles (33.5 km^{2}) as of 2020.

East Longmeadow is bordered by Enfield and Somers, Connecticut, to the south; Hampden to the east; Wilbraham on the northeast; Springfield on the north and northwest; and Longmeadow on the west.

== Demographics ==
Historical population
Year	Pop.	±%
1900	1,187	—
1910	1,553	+30.8%
1920	2,352	+51.4%
1930	3,327	+41.5%
1940	3,403	+2.3%
1950	4,881	+43.4%
1960	10,294	+110.9%
1970	13,029	+26.6%
1980	12,905	−1.0%
1990	13,367	+3.6%
2000	14,100	+5.5%
2010	15,720	+11.5%
2020	16,430	+4.5%
2024*	16,515	+0.5%
* = population estimate. Source: United States Census records and Population Estimates Program data.

As of the census of 2010, there were 16,187 people, 5,248 households, and 3,988 families residing in the town. The population density was 1,087.1 inhabitants per square mile (419.7/km^{2}). There were 5,363 housing units at an average density of 413.5 per square mile (159.7/km^{2}). The racial makeup of the town was 97.52% White, 0.74% African American, 0.04% Native American, 0.88% Asian, 0.05% Pacific Islander, 0.24% from other races, and 0.52% from two or more races. Hispanic or Latino of any race were 0.92% of the population.

There were 5,248 households, out of which 34.1% had children under the age of 18 living with them, 65.7% were married couples living together, 7.5% had a female householder with no husband present, and 24.0% were non-families. 21.6% of all households were made up of individuals, and 13.8% had someone living alone who was 65 years of age or older. The average household size was 2.65 and the average family size was 3.10.

In the town, the population was spread out, with 24.8% under the age of 18, 5.5% from 18 to 24, 26.4% from 25 to 44, 24.6% from 45 to 64, and 18.8% who were 65 years of age or older. The median age was 41 years. For every 100 females, there were 90.7 males. For every 100 females age 18 and over, there were 86.2 males.

The median income for a household in the town was $62,680, and the median income for a family was $70,571. Males had a median income of $51,062 versus $32,267 for females. The per capita income for the town was $27,659. About 2.1% of families and 3.4% of the population were below the poverty line, including 4.7% of those under age 18 and 5.9% of those age 65 or over.

== Points of interest ==
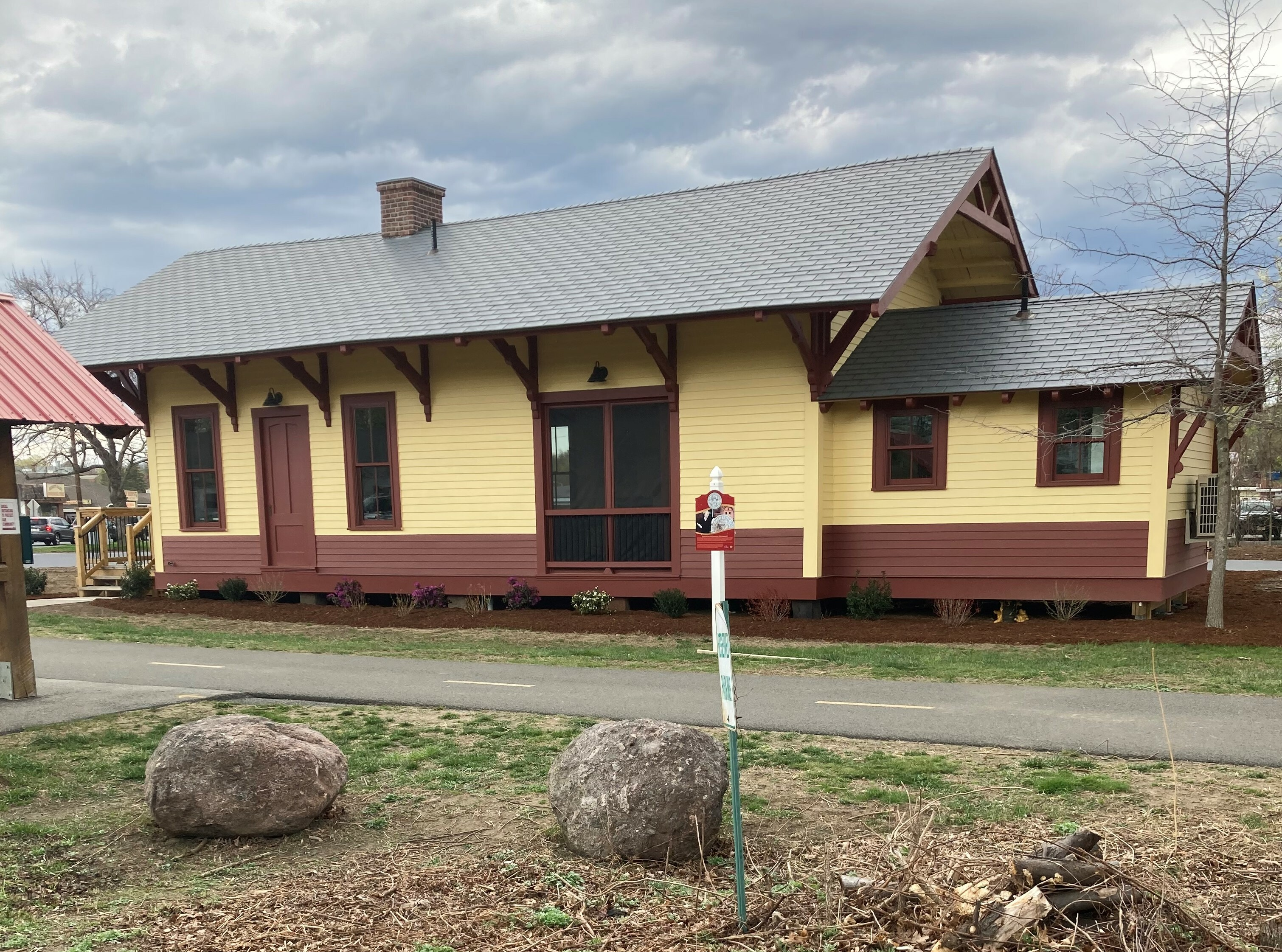
East Longmeadow train depot (2021)

A point of interest in East Longmeadow is Heritage Park. Heritage Park has a body of water (Blackman's Pond) with fish, as well as baseball fields, soccer field, playscape, and a picnicking area. Historic places in East Longmeadow include the numerous red and brown sandstone quarries that gave the town its industrial beginnings and from which the original Smithsonian Institution Building in Washington was mined, the Elijah Burt House, The Seward Pease House, The Train depot, and the First Congregational Church. Another point of interest is the area around the central rotary called "The rotary". Here, there are small shops, including many restaurants. East Longmeadow is also home (or partial home) to a few golf courses. The Rotary itself was made famous by Robert Ripley, author of Ripley's Believe It or Not and listed because of the seven streets feeding into it with no traffic lights.

Also an integral part of East Longmeadow are the many churches, such as St. Michael's (Catholic), St. Paul's (Lutheran), St. Mark's (Episcopal), First Congregational (UCC), First Baptist, Cornerstone Church, East Longmeadow United Methodist, St. Luke's (Greek Orthodox) and many more.

East Longmeadow was home to Milton Bradley Company for many years, and still houses one of its largest facilities after Hasbro bought the corporation in 1984. In 2016 the Hasbro location was purchased by Cartamundi.

== Government ==
Until June 30, 2016, East Longmeadow had an annual open town meeting held on the third Monday in May and presided over by a town moderator, who also was responsible for appointing the town's Appropriations Committee. The chief executive board in the town was the Board of Selectmen. It consisted of three popularly elected members who held staggered three-year terms.

Besides this board, which also served the role of Fire and Police Commissioners and the Board of Health, the town had a series of independent Executive Boards: the Boards of Public Works, Planning, Library Trustees, Assessors, a School Committee, and an independent, elected Housing Authority Board. The town also has numerous advisory boards under these executive boards.

Charter Review Commission: The East Longmeadow Charter Review Commission was elected in April 2015 to review the form of town government and to write a town charter for submission to the voters. It passed in April 2016.

=== Town Council ===
In June 2016, East Longmeadow elected a seven-member Town Council. Current Town Councilors are listed below.

Town Councilor	Year elected- End of Current Term
Anna Jones (Vice President)	2022–2028
Ralph Page	2019–2028
Kathleen Hill	2016–2028
Connor O'Shea (President)	2021–2027
James Leydon	2024–2027
Jonathan Torcia	2023–2029
Matthew Boucher	2026–2029

*Appointed by Town Council to fill vacancy, won election in the next year's annual election

In December 2016, the Town Council voted unanimously (7–0) to offer Denise Menard the job of Town Manager. She was the first Town Manager in East Longmeadow history until her retirement in August 2019. Mary McNally was hired as the town's second-ever Town Manager in late 2019. In June 2023, McNally resigned as Town Manager. Deputy Town Manager Tom Christianson became Town Manager on July 1, 2023.

With the adoption of the new charter, East Longmeadow became a statutory city under Massachusetts state law on July 1, 2016.

=== School Committee ===
Elected by the voters is a five-member school committee. They serve staggered three-year terms.

School Committee Member	Years Elected- Current term end
Aimee Dalenta (Chair)	2022–2028
Antonella Raschilla-Manzi	2019–2028
Kerri Jarzabski (Vice Chair}	2025–2029
William Strother	2024-2029
Sarah Truoiolo	2026-2027

== Education ==
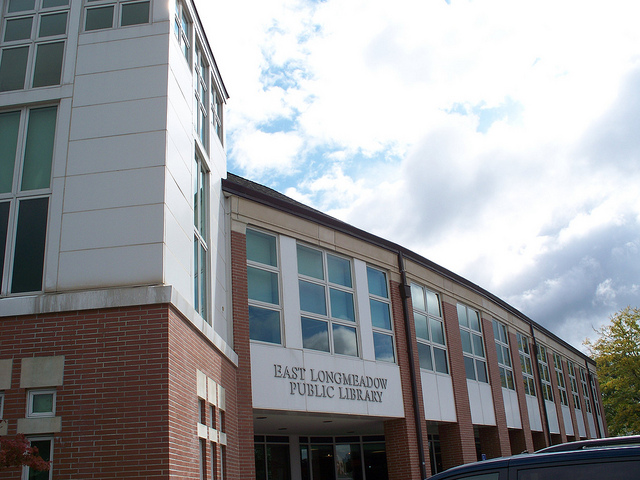
Front of the East Longmeadow public library (2011)

== Library ==
The East Longmeadow public library began in 1896, but in 2004 a new library was built. In fiscal year 2008, the town of East Longmeadow spent 1.4% ($584,361) of its budget on its public library; $38 per person.

== Notable people ==
- Kim Adler, professional bowler, 15 national PWBA titles including the 1999 U.S. Women's Open
- Nick Ahmed, former professional Baseball Player for the Arizona Diamondbacks
- Victoria Aveyard, writer, author of the popular YA Series, Red Queen
- Anne Burlak, early twentieth-century leader in labor organizing and leftist political movements
- Wendell Corey, actor and politician
- Tim Daggett, Olympic gold medalist
- Ken Dilanian, journalist, graduated from East Longmeadow High School
- Peter Dolfen, sport shooter who competed in the 1912 Summer Olympics
- Jim Douglas, politician, graduated from East Longmeadow High School
- Pete Franklin, sports talk radio host, born in East Longmeadow
- Joseph Grigely, visual artist and scholar
- John Kawie, comedian, actor and writer
- Erik P. Kraft, writer, grew up in East Longmeadow, and his novel Miracle Wimp is set there
- Brian Lees, Massachusetts politician, former State Senator from the First Hampden and Hampshire District and Massachusetts Senate Minority Leader
- Sue C. Nichols, artist, best known for her work with Walt Disney Animation Studios
- James Lorin Richards, financier and industrialist, born on a farm in East Longmeadow
- Kyle Smith, writer, film critic for the New York Post, grew up in East Longmeadow
- Raymond F. Sullivan, politician who served on the Massachusetts Governor's Council
- Antonio Thomas, professional wrestler and personal trainer
- James Thorpe, soccer player
- Jim Trelease, educator and author
- Frank Vatrano, professional Ice Hockey player for the Anaheim Ducks
- Robert F. Willard, retired United States Navy admiral, graduated from East Longmeadow High School
