= Uxbridge High School (Massachusetts) =

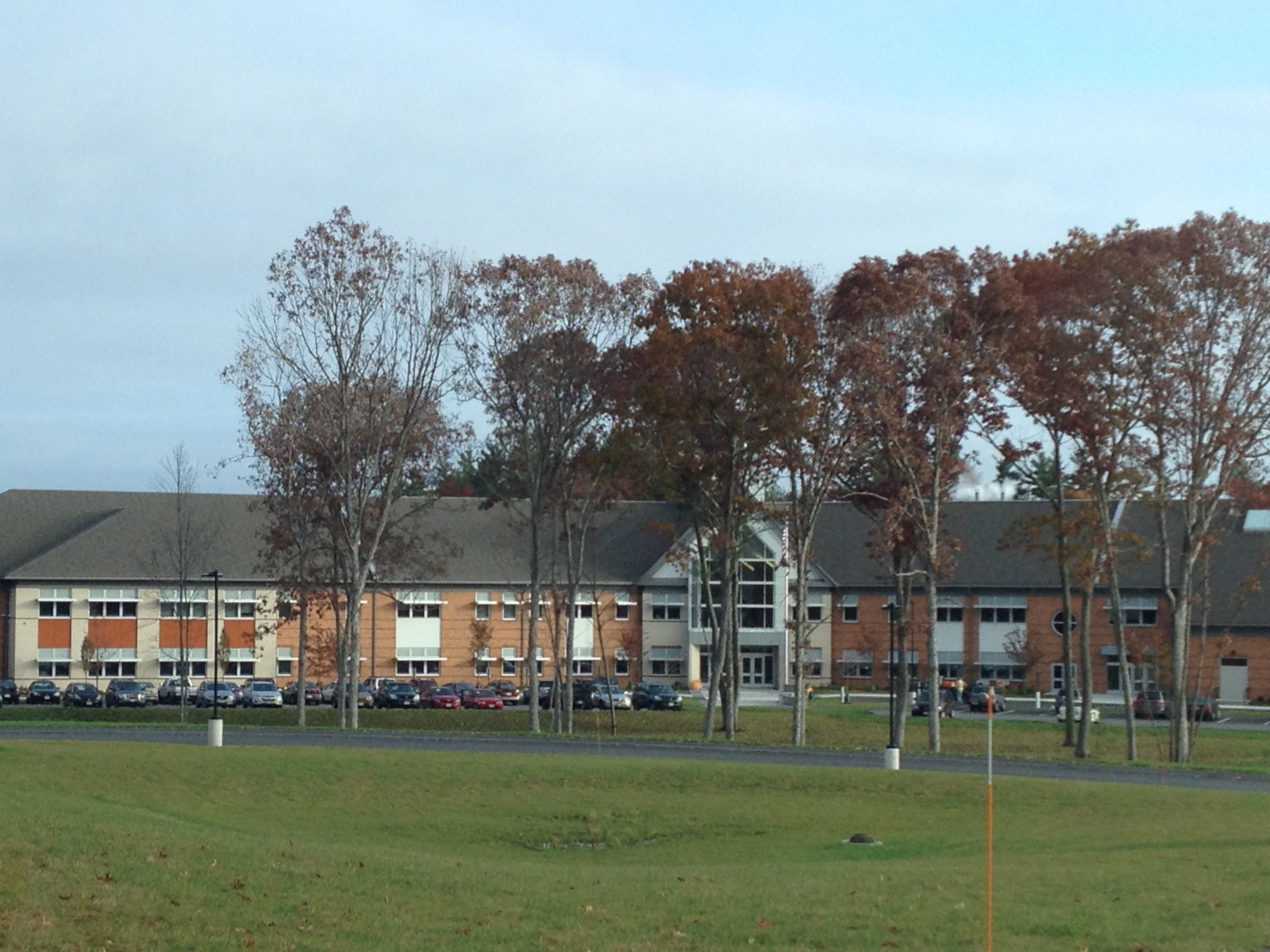
- View of Uxbridge High School in 2012.

Location
- 300 Quaker Highway; Uxbridge, Massachusetts 01569; United States; 42.0511°N 71.6182°W

Information
- Type: Public high school
- Motto: Responsibility, Respect, Equity, Collaboration
- School district: Uxbridge Public Schools
- Superintendent: Patrick Dillon
- Principal: Michael Rubin
- Faculty: 53.19 (FTE)
- Grades: 8–12
- Enrollment: 582 (2023–24)
- Student to teacher ratio: 10.96
- Colors: Black and orange
- Athletics: MIAA
- Athletics conference: Central Massachusetts Athletic Conference
- Team name: Spartans
- Rival: Northbridge High School
- Website: Official website

Uxbridge High School is the only public high school in Uxbridge, Massachusetts. The school, located within the village of Ironstone, is a part of Uxbridge Public Schools system.

== History ==
Known to have been in operation as far back as 1896, Uxbridge High School had a building designed by the architect S. Wesley Haynes on Capron Street in 1935. In 2012, the school moved to a new building at 300 Quaker Highway.

In addition to academics, Uxbridge High School offers such activities as a chapter of the National Honor Society, band, drama, and chorus, known as the Spartones.

== Athletics ==
Home of the Spartans, Uxbridge High School athletic teams sport the colors of black and orange. The school is a member of the Central Massachusetts Athletic Conference, and competes within District II of the Massachusetts Interscholastic Athletic Association (MIAA). Uxbridge High offers the following sports: baseball, basketball, cheerleading, cross country, football, golf, hockey, softball, soccer, tennis, and track and field.

In 1996, the Uxbridge High School football team celebrated its centennial.

In 2023, The Uxbridge High School Football Team won the Division 7 MIAA Championship, As well as finishing the season with an undefeated record (13-0), being one of only three teams in the state to do so.

Uxbridge High School is also noted for its Field Hockey team, who are four-time consecutive champions of their division (2021, 2022, 2023, 2024)

Uxbridge High School’s main rivals are Northbridge High School, and vice versa. They compete in an annual Thanksgiving football game known as “Battle of the Bridges”

== Athletic state championships ==
In recent years, Uxbridge has become known for their athletics, particularly because of their dominant Football and Field Hockey programs. With a total of 8 state championships, 6 of them have been won since 2021. All 8 of Uxbridge's state championships have been from Field Hockey and Football.

Note: From 1972 to 2012, football state championships were separated by region, so there would be multiple champions from each division. From 1972 to 1977 and from 1997 to 2008, it was split between Eastern Mass and Central/Western Mass and there would be two champions in each division. From 1978 to 1996 and from 2009 to 2012 Central and Western Mass split so there would be three champions in each division. In 2013 everything was combined and therefore only allowed one state champion per division.

| Sport | Year(s) |
MIAA sanctioned sports
| Field Hockey (5) | 2021, 2022, 2023, 2024, 2025 |
| Football (3) | 1991, 1992, 2023 |

== Demographics ==
Uxbridge High School typically enrolls around 500 students and their age groups range from grades 8 through 12. The demographics of the school are as follows: 91.5% White, 2.7% Hispanic, 2.1% African American, 1.2% Asian, and 1.9% Multiracial.

== Notable alumni ==
- Tim Fortugno (1980), Major League Baseball player
- Albert Harkness (did not graduate), educator

== See also ==
- List of high schools in Massachusetts
