= Middle Haddam School =

- U.S. National Register of Historic Places
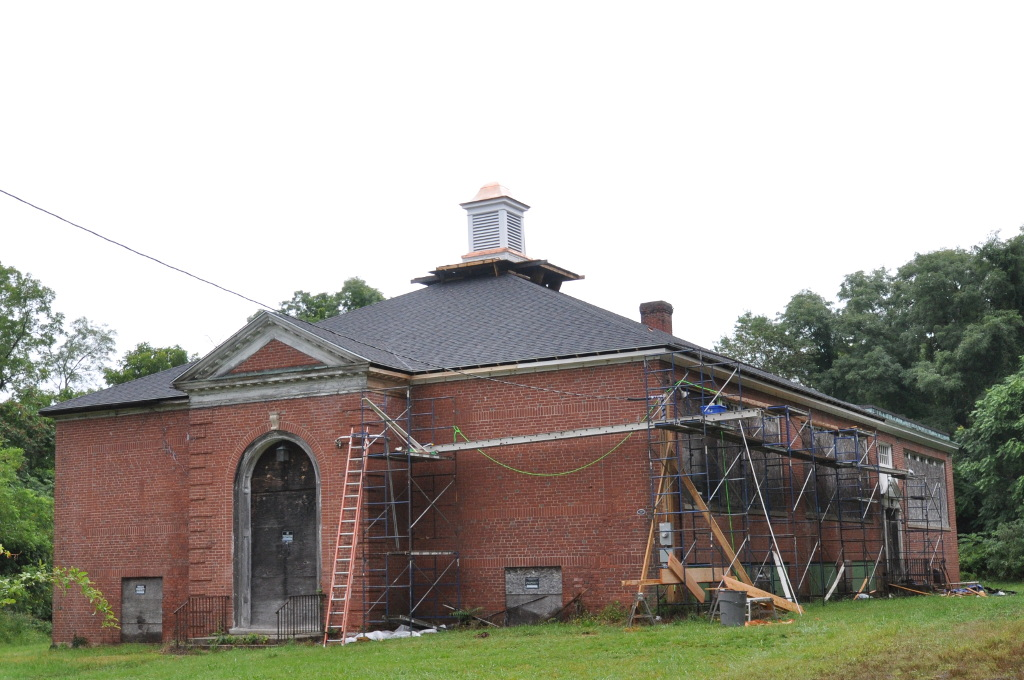

- Location within Connecticut Location within the United States
- Location: 12 Schoolhouse Lane, East Hampton, Connecticut
- Coordinates: 41°33′09″N 72°32′52″W
- Area: 2.2 acres (0.89 ha)
- Built: 1930
- Architectural style: Colonial Revival
- NRHP reference No.: 100004545
- Added to NRHP: October 18, 2019

Middle Haddam School is a historic school building at 12 Schoolhouse Lane in East Hampton, Connecticut. Built in 1930 in the Colonial Revival architectural style, the building was listed on the National Register of Historic Places in 2019.

== Description and history ==
Build at a cost of $30,000 and designed by architects S. Wesley Haynes and Harold E. Mason, the two-story red brick building served as a primary school and community center from 1930 until the summer of 1980, when the East Hampton school board voted to close the school permanently due to declining enrollment. By 1979, only kindergartners were being taught there.

In 1982, the town board of selectmen sold the school and surrounding 2-acre parcel to a developer who planned to convert the property into 12 condominium units. The plan faced fierce opposition from residents of the village of Middle Haddam, and two years later, a judge barred the construction of condos because it would violate Middle Haddam's strict residential zoning laws. The schoolhouse was left vacant until another developer purchased it in 2005 to build senior housing on the property. Local opponents of development formed the Middle Haddam Association and raised $150,000 to purchase the property instead.

In 2017, the Middle Haddam Association asked town officials to invest up to $5 million to renovate the schoolhouse for use as a municipal facility. Without government intervention, residents warned, the building might have to be demolished.

== See also ==
- National Register of Historic Places listings in Middlesex County, Connecticut
