= Elijah Burt House =

Historic house in Massachusetts, United States

- U.S. National Register of Historic Places
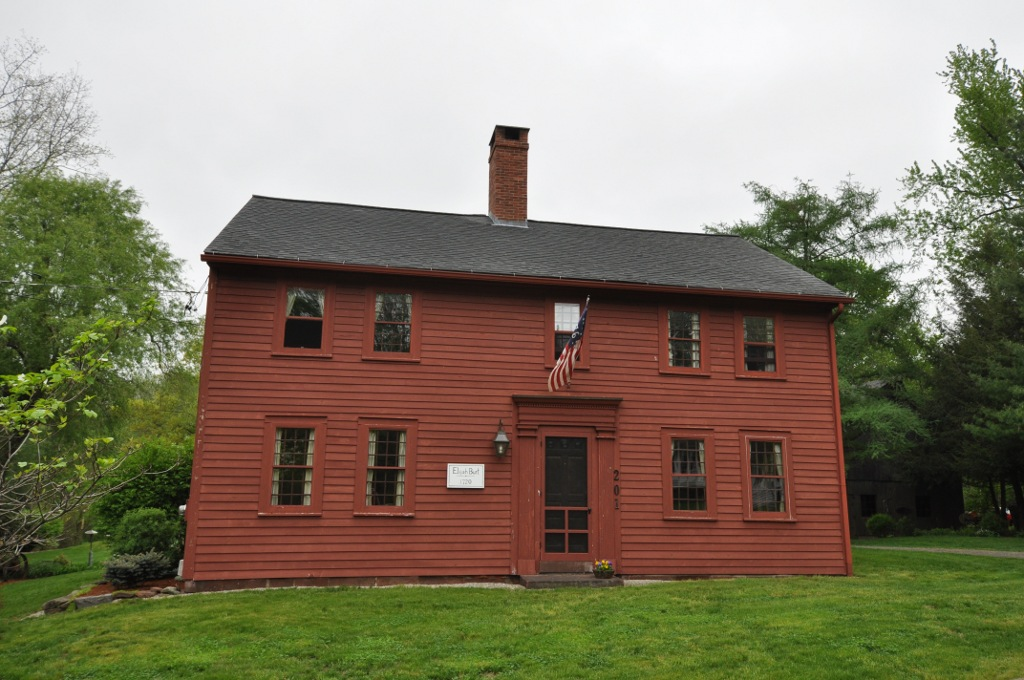

- Location within Massachusetts Location within the United States
- Location: 201 Chestnut St., East Longmeadow, Massachusetts
- Coordinates: 42°3′15″N 72°30′54″W
- Area: 2.3 acres (0.93 ha)
- Built: 1720
- Architectural style: Georgian
- NRHP reference No.: 76000240
- Added to NRHP: April 26, 1976

The Elijah Burt House is a historic house at 201 Chestnut Street in East Longmeadow, Massachusetts. Built sometime between 1720 and 1740, it is believed to be the oldest surviving building in the town, and a station on the Underground Railroad. The house was listed on the National Register of Historic Places in 1976.

== Description and history ==
The Elijah Burt House is located south of the center of East Longmeadow, on the north side of Chestnut Street roughly midway between Shaker Road and Prospect Street. It is a 2 1/2-story wood-frame structure, five bays wide, with a side-gable roof, clapboard siding, and a central chimney. The main entrance is at the center of the front facade, flanked by pilasters, and topped by a corniced entablature. Its interior retains original wide pine floors, fireplaces with beehive ovens, and gunstock posts in the corners. Part of the interior includes a secret passage that may have been used to shelter escaping slaves as part of the Underground Railroad.

The house was built sometime between 1720 and 1740, and is believed to be the oldest house in East Longmeadow. It served in early days as a stop on stagecoach routes. In the years before the Civil War, an abolitionist owner is said to have harbored fugitive slaves in the basement, with a tunnel providing an escape into nearby woods. The house underwent a Victorian update in the late 19th century, with a Queen Anne style porch with turned posts; most of these changes were reversed during 20th-century work to restore its 18th-century appearance.

== See also ==
- National Register of Historic Places listings in Hampden County, Massachusetts
