= Erik P. Kraft =

American writer

Erik P. Kraft is a writer and illustrator of children's books. His first book, Chocolatina (Bridgewater Books, 1998) was illustrated by Denise Brunkus, but from that point on, he illustrated his own books. Lenny and Mel (2002), Lenny and Mel's Summer Vacation (2003), and Lenny and Mel: Afterschool Confidential (2004) were all published by Simon & Schuster. Miracle Wimp, a young adult novel featuring illustrations, was released in August 2007 by Little, Brown. Kraft came to writing later in life. Besides writing children and young adult books, Kraft is an adjunct professor at Columbia University and writes reviews for Boston Book Review.

== Books ==
- Chocolatina illustrated by Denise Brunkus, BridgeWater Books (Mahwah, NJ), 1998.
- Lenny and Mel, Simon & Schuster (New York, NY), 2002.
- Lenny and Mel's Summer Vacation, Simon & Schuster (New York, NY), 2003.
- Lenny and Mel: After-school Confidential, Simon & Schuster (New York, NY), 2004.
- Miracle Wimp, Little, Brown (New York, NY), 2007.
