= Ken Dilanian =

American journalist

- Born: Holyoke, Massachusetts
- Education: Williams College
- Occupation: Journalist
- Employer: MS NOW

Ken Dilanian is an American journalist. As of 2024, he is based in Washington, D.C., serving as justice and intelligence correspondent for MS NOW.

== Early life and education ==
Dilanian was born in Holyoke, Massachusetts. He is of Armenian descent. He was a starting senior right guard and defensive end on his high school football team and graduated from East Longmeadow High School in 1986. While a student there, he was sports editor of the school paper, The Spartan Spectator. He is a 1991 graduate of Williams College, where he majored in political science. Dilanian played football at Williams and is credited with a major role in helping the Ephmen achieve their first unbeaten and untied season in a century.

== Career ==
Dilanian's first professional position after graduating from Williams was at The Philadelphia Inquirer According to Dilanian, his first published article at the Inquirer was a story on a pet funeral. He then worked for several local newspapers in Texas before returning to the Inquirer.

Dilanian joined USA Today in 2007, where for three years he covered foreign policy and Congress.

He was a reporter in the Los Angeles Times' Washington, D.C., bureau from April 2010 until May 2014. As a Rome-based foreign correspondent, he made frequent trips to Iraq. FOIA'd Central Intelligence Agency (CIA) correspondence later revealed that he had shared articles with the CIA while he was working on them for the Los Angeles Times. Dilanian routinely submitted drafts of his stories to the CIA for approval, according to CIA documents. According to The Intercept, Dilanian explicitly promised "positive news coverage ... In at least one instance, the CIA's reaction appears to have led to significant changes in the story." The Los Angeles Times confirmed the story but disputed the idea that the published versions of any stories written by Dilanian were inaccurate. The Associated Press, which hired Dilanian to cover the intelligence community, conducted a review and according to a spokesman, concluded that any prepublication exchanges Dilanian had with the CIA were in pursuit of accuracy.

After leaving the Los Angeles Times, Dilanian worked briefly as lead national security reporter for the Associated Press before joining NBC News and MSNBC (now MS NOW) in 2015 as justice and intelligence correspondent, a role he continues to hold as of 2024. In May 2025, he was moved to MS NOW in the same role in preparation for its spinoff from NBCUniversal and NBC News.

=== Recognition ===
Dilanian is the recipient of the 2007 Casey Medal for Meritorious Journalism for a series he co-authored on Philadelphia's child welfare system.

== Personal life ==
Dilanian is married and has two children.
