= Red Queen (novel) =

Novel by Victoria Aveyard

- Author: Victoria Aveyard
- Language: English
- Genre: Young adult, dystopia, romantic fantasy
- Publisher: HarperTeen
- Publication date: 2015
- Publication place: United States
- Media type: Print (hardback)
- Pages: 388
- ISBN: 978-1-4091-5072-5

Red Queen is a young adult dystopian fantasy romance novel written by American writer Victoria Aveyard. Published in February 2015, it was her first novel and first series. Aveyard followed up with three sequels: Glass Sword, King's Cage and War Storm. Red Queen won the 2015 Goodreads Choice Award for Debut Goodreads Author and was nominated for the 2015 Goodreads Choice Award for Young Adult Fantasy & Science Fiction.

== Plot ==
In a year known as the New Era, people are divided by blood- those with Red and those with Silver, the latter having supernatural abilities, which made them superior, wealthy, and nearly gods, opposite to the lowly, impoverished Reds, who worked as servants to the Silvers and were often conscripted, usually after their eighteenth birthday if they had no job or apprenticeship, into a war between the kingdoms of the Lakelands and Norta.

Seventeen-year-old Mare Barrow is a Red living with her parents, Daniel and Ruth, and younger sister, Gisa, in a village known as the Stilts in the Capital River Valley region of Norta. Mare's older brothers, Bree, Tramy, and Shade, are away from home, serving on the front line of the century-old war against the neighboring Lakelands. Mare is jealous of Gisa because her skill in sewing would earn her a job working for the Silvers as a seamstress, protecting her from conscription. Having no apprenticeship, Mare instead turns to thieving to provide what she can for her family before she too is conscripted. When Mare learns that her best friend, Kilorn Warren, will be conscripted after the death of his apprentice master, she seeks out a colleague, Will Whistle, to plan an escape from conscription. Will directs her to a woman named Farley, a captain of the Scarlet Guard, a rebel group of Reds aiming to bring equality between their people and the Silvers. Farley demands two thousand crowns in exchange for Kilorn's and Mare's escape, a price Mare can't afford.

Mare plans to steal from Summerton, a Silver city her sister regularly travels to for her apprenticeship. While there, live reports announce that the Scarlet Guard have bombed Whitefire Palace, sparking chaos in the Summerton Market and forcing Mare and Gisa to flee for their lives. When she learns that Mare was unable to get what she needed, Gisa tries to help by attempting to pickpocket a fleeing Silver, but she is caught and her sewing hand is broken beyond repair for her crime. Unable to bear the guilt of losing her sisters job, Mare sneaks out at night to a tavern to steal what she can from customers to occupy her thoughts. She is caught while attempting to steal from a boy, who surprisingly does not turn her in, but instead gives her some money for her return home. He informs her that his name is Cal and that he works as a servant at the royal palace, and promises to secure her a job at the palace and gives her another coin after Mare explains why she was robbing the tavern's customers. The next day Mare's family is unexpectedly informed that her brothers had been released from service, and Mare is taken to the Hall of the Sun. She discovers that Cal, who is actually Crown Prince Tiberias Calore VII, King Tiberias Calore VI's son, had indeed kept his promise of a job and arranged for the release of her brothers. Mare arrives just in time for Queenstrial, where the most powerful daughters of Silver nobility will compete for Cal's hand in marriage. While serving the nobility at Queenstrial Mare falls toward the arena, which is protected by an electric shield. Instead of being electrocuted to death, Mare displays electrokinetic powers and falls into the arena, where she has to defend herself from Evangeline Samos, a magnetron already intended to be Cal's bride. Mare attempts to escape the palace but is captured by Cal and several Sentinel guards. Because the King fears of an uprising should word spread of a Red with supernatural powers, Mare is engaged to the king's second son, Maven, and is forced by the King and Queen Elara to pretend to be Mareena Titanos, "long-lost" orphaned daughter of a Silver general, adopted as a baby by a Red couple on the war front.

Now having to live as a royal within the King's ranks, Mare finds herself in classes on etiquette, history, and controlling her power. She befriends librarian Julian Jacos, one of her teachers and Cal's uncle, who helps her develop further control over her ability. Mare feels torn as she becomes acquainted with Cal and Maven, realizing she is in love with Cal, her betrothed's brother and the future Silver King. One night, Cal takes Mare to her home in the Stilts to say goodbye to her family, where she finds Bree and Tramy have returned home, but that Shade was beheaded by Silver officers for desertion. Furious that her brother was killed by Silvers, Mare joins the Scarlet Guard. In a meeting with Farley, Mare is infuriated to learn that Kilorn also joined the Guard, and surprised to discover that Maven joined as well. This new revelation brings Mare and Maven closer together as they assist in a plot to weaken the Silver nobility. The plan involves disrupting a royal ball by killing several notable Silvers, but the plan fails when an unexpected bomb goes off, killing many innocents and resulting in the imprisonment of Kilorn, Farley, and other members of the Scarlet Guard. The rebels are freed with Julian's help, but Mare is alarmed when she learns that Farley was not responsible for the bomb dropped at the palace. Silver nobility use the bomb to paint the Scarlet Guard as dangerous terrorists.

Julian confesses that his research concludes that Mare's blood has a genetic mutation, allowing for a Red to have exceptionally strong Silver-like powers; furthermore, she is not the only one with the mutation. Shade also had the mutation, which led to his execution; Mare was only spared was because her powers manifested in front of many Silver onlookers, thus preventing a cover-up. Julian also mentions that he needs to go into hiding, leaving Mare a list of names of people like her before she travels with the royal family to Whitefire Palace, the King's residence in Archeon.

After the attack made by the Scarlet Guard, the Reds are punished with the lowering of the age of conscription to fifteen. Mare herself is ordered to broadcast the new law. In a meeting with Farley in an abandoned area the Silvers believe to be hazardous, Mare and Maven help create a plan to infiltrate Whitefire Palace. Using a rebel-made underground network of Undertrains, the rebels strike an invasion while Mare attempts to convince Cal to allow the Scarlet Guard overtake the castle, admitting to working with the Scarlet Guard. Cal, stung by her betrayal, refuses and arrests both Mare and Maven, taking them to the castle. However, once in the presence of Queen Elara and King Tiberius, Queen Elara reveals that she and Maven have been manipulating Mare in a plot to make Maven the King and murder Cal. Maven hints that he and his mother caused the explosion to paint the Scarlet Guard in a bad light. Elara uses her power of mind control to force Cal to kill his father on live television, thus branding him and Mare traitors and allowing Maven to be crowned King. It is also revealed that Elara had indirectly killed Tiberias's first wife, Queen Coriane, many years ago in order to gain more power.

Mare and Cal are sentenced to death and put in an arena to fight to the death, where an Arven stifles Mare's power. Mare and Cal battle their former sparring partners, including Evangeline. They manage to kill the Arven stifling Mare's power, along with several other Silvers, before they are rescued by the Scarlet Guard and escape by the Undertrain. There Mare meets with Farley, Kilorn, and, to her shock, Shade, who had faked his death and has also joined the Scarlet Guard. Mare vows to take revenge against Maven, and use the list she acquired from Julian to seek out others like her.

== Characters ==
- Mare Barrow: A seventeen-year-old Red girl who steals for a living. The discovery of her electrokinetic powers causes many to try to vie for her allegiance. Mare's ability allows her to create, absorb or release lightning, earning her nickname, the "little lightning girl."
- Tiberias "Cal" Calore VII: The eldest son and heir of King Tiberias Calore VI through his first wife, Queen Coriane Jacos. Though he is engaged to Evangeline Samos, he is in love with Mare, a fact that she uses to further her goals in the Scarlet Guard. He is a Burner, which means his Silver powers allow him to manipulate fire.
- Maven Calore: King Tiberias VI's second son through his second wife, Queen Elara Merandus, and Cal's half-brother. He is shy, but Mare's sudden engagement with him makes him open up. Like Cal and his father, Maven is a Burner. Maven is deeply jealous of Cal, partly because he thought his brother had won Mare's heart, the way he had won their father's. It is revealed at the end that he is evil.
- Diana Farley: A captain of the Scarlet Guard who leads them in the campaigns against the Silvers. She is strongly dedicated to the cause.
- Tiberias Calore VI: The current king of Norta who has married twice, producing two sons: Cal and Maven. He is a Burner, which he passed to both of his sons.
- Elara Merandus: The mysterious and sadistic current queen of Norta and the mother of Maven. Mare dislikes her since the very start of their meeting. She is able to read and manipulate people with the ability known as Whispering.
- Julian Jacos: A royal librarian and the brother of Cal's deceased mother, Coriane. He is the last known person to hold the power of a Singer: being able to control people through his voice.
- Evangeline Samos: A haughty girl who is made Cal's fiancée after being declared the best of the aspiring princesses. She holds a grudge against Mare, particularly after the latter humiliates her by expending her electrokinesis and repelling her magnetic manipulation, a trait of the House Samos.
- Kilorn Warren: Mare's best friend and an apprentice of fishing. Mare seems content to eventually become his wife until her engagement with Maven makes them drift apart. The attempt to spare him of conscription is the catalyst of much of the novel's plot.
- Lucas Samos: Evangeline's cousin who, like her, holds the power of magnetic manipulation. He is one of the few Silvers whom Mare befriends and trusts with certainty.
- Rane Arven: The instructor for the Silver Elites who has the ability to negate the powers of others, known as Silencing.
- Ptolemus Samos: Evangeline's older brother. Like her, he is a Magnetron, holding the power of magnetic manipulation.
- Sara Skonos: A friend of Julian who works as a nurse with her ability to heal people, known as Skin Healing. She seems to know the truth behind the death of Cal's mother, Queen Coriane, and Elara thus punished her by mutilating her tongue, making her mute.
- Tristan: Farley's loyal right-hand man in the Scarlet Guard. He is killed by Ptolemus Samos when caught in the attack on the Hall.
- Ann Walsh: A member of the Scarlet Guard who is about the same age as Mare. She works as a servant in Mare's room in the Hall and tells Mare the time of the midnight meeting with the Scarlet Guard. On the attack of the Hall, she is captured but escapes with Farley and Kilorn. While making sure the way is clear for Mare and the others to come back to the Whitefire Palace, she is captured and commits suicide with a pill before the queen is able to interrogate her. Her last words were "For Tristan".
- Gisa Barrow: Mare's 14-year-old sister who works as an apprentice for a seamstress, until her broken hand terminates her from the job.
- Mare's other family members consist of a war-weary father, a homemaker mother, and three older brothers: the hunky but unperceptive Bree, the sycophantic Tramy, and the lean but smart Shade. Out of the three, Mare is the closest to Shade, who is 19 years old.
- Coriane Jacos: The late wife of Tiberias Calore VI and sister to Julian Jacos. Coriane was known as the "Singer Queen" because the Jacos house were Singers. Queen Elara did not like Coriane becoming queen so Elara murdered Coriane and took the crown, killing Tiberias at the end of the book.

== Reception ==
Red Queen has been generally well received. The Guardian gave the novel four stars. Vilma Gonzalez of USA Today described the novel positively, revealing that "Aveyard’s compelling debut is richly imagined, addictive, chilling and suspenseful. She breathes new life into her own unique Game of Thrones story enlivened by exciting, character-driven plot twists that have me clamoring for more. This scintillating tale of betrayals and blood-spattered crowns is not to be missed."

However, Grand Forks Herald's Cassidy Anderson stated "Ultimately, this book was over-hyped. It's still a fun read as long as you are not looking for anything with a lot of depth or meaning to it." The Christian Science Monitor described the book as a dystopian novel.

Kirkus Reviews saw "An inventive, character-driven twist breathes new life into tired fantasy trends."

Publishers Weekly found "There’s an unmistakable feeling of deja vu to this first installment in the Red Queen trilogy, which shares several plot points and similarities with the Hunger Games series, ... Fortunately, Aveyard’s conclusion leaves the story poised to depart from this derivative setup."

Common Sense Media wrote "With its courageous protagonist, action-packed plot, and romantic possibilities, Red Queen is a winning series start for fantasy and dystopia lovers."

== Adaptations ==
Gennifer Hutchison, a writer and producer on Better Call Saul and Breaking Bad, was hired in 2015 by Universal Pictures to adapt the novel into a feature film. Pitch Perfect 2 director Elizabeth Banks was in talks with the studio to direct and produce the project.

In May 2021, it was reported that Peacock is in developing a television series adaptation of the novel. Banks is set to direct and also set to star in a supporting role.
