= John Kawie =

John Kawie (1949) is an American comedian, actor and writer of Lebanese descent.

== Early life and education ==
Kawie was born in Springfield, Massachusetts. He attended Williston Northampton School.

== Career ==
Kawie ran the family business "Kawie Tool Supply" for seventeen years supplying the aerospace industry.

In 1990 he sold his company and moved to New York City to become a stand-up comedian. As an Arab-American comic his comedy focused on funny situations related to his heritage. He co-produced a multicultural stand-up show called “Those People” which was featured in Alan King’s 1995 Toyota Comedy Festival in New York City.

Kawie was a regular as a writer and performer on “The David Brenner Radio Show”, and a contributor to Bill Maher’s monologue on Comedy Central’s award winning show “Politically Incorrect”. He was a substitute host for Dick Cavett on his radio show, he also contributed material to Dennis Miller’s show on HBO. He also appeared in television commercials.

At the age of 47, Kawie experienced a serious stroke. While undergoing therapy at the Rusk Institute he was a consultant with Robert De Niro, whose character was a stroke survivor in the Joel Shumacher film “Flawless”.

Kawie was unable to continue as a standup comedian, so he switched to writing a solo show, “Brain Freeze” which is about his experiences during and after his stroke. “Brain Freeze” has been performed Off Broadway and at theaters and hospitals throughout the country. It has received critical acclaim from the national press, the medical community, The Lancet, and several other reviewers. “Brain Freeze” was performed at the 2003 International Fringe Festival in New York City in 2003, and was declared Best Solo Show. In 2010 the performance was recorded live at Gotham Comedy Club in New York City in front of a lively full house, and is available in DVD.

Kawie also writes a humor column called “Life At The Curb” for the American Heart Association’s award-winning magazine “Stroke Connection.” In 2015 he won a FOLIO Eddie Award for Best Column/Blog for Non-Profit Association. (https://web.archive.org/web/20160117201651/http://www.foliomag.com/2015/2015-folio-eddie-digital-award-finalists/7/)

He has been a keynote speaker for hospitals and stroke support groups around the country.

John resides in New York City with his wife and artist Marilyn Manno.
