= Victoria Aveyard =

American writer of young adult and fantasy fiction

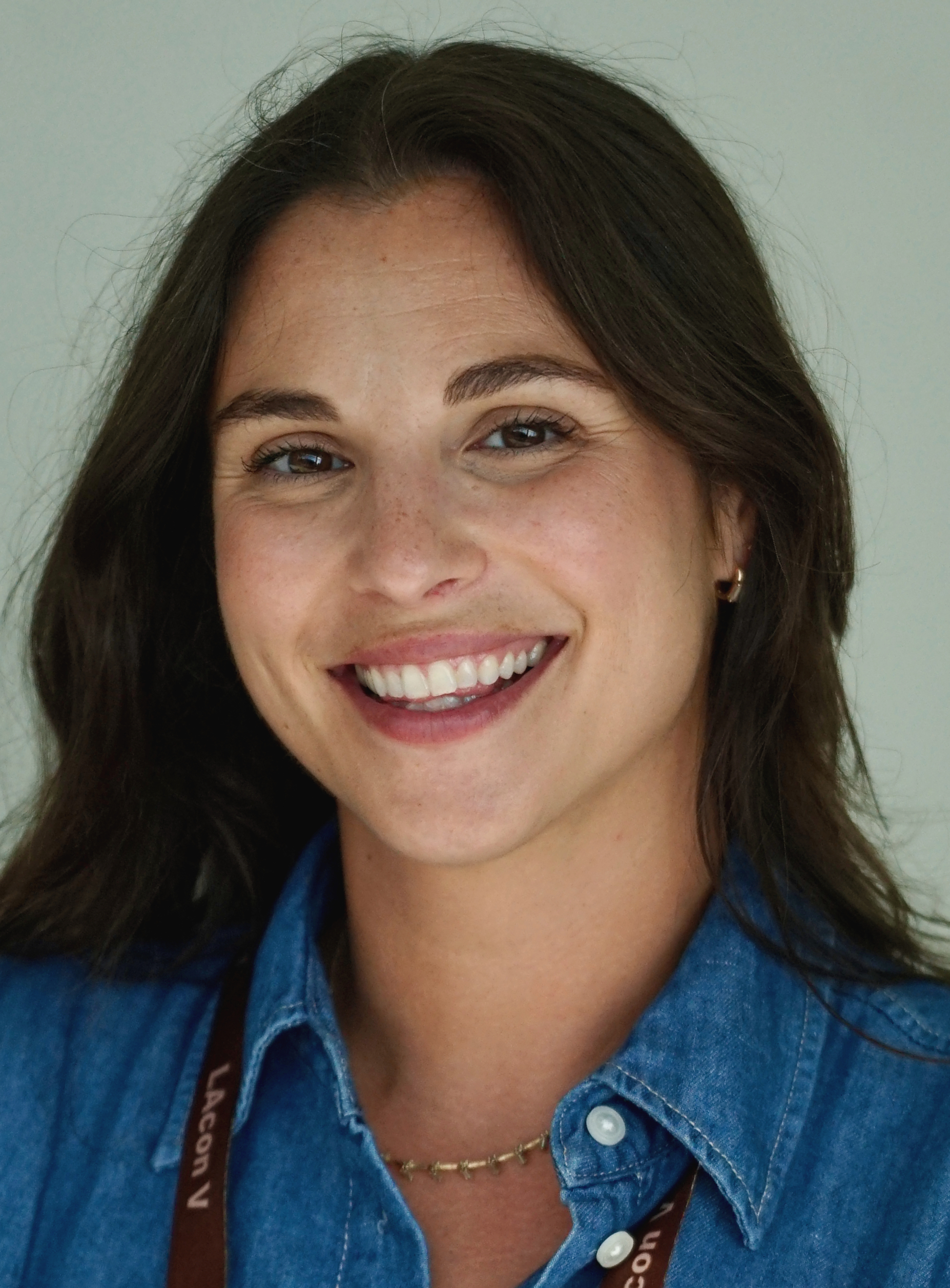
- Aveyard at Worldcon 2026
- Born: July 27, 1990 (age 36); East Longmeadow, Massachusetts, U.S.
- Education: University of Southern California (BFA)
- Occupations: Novelist; Screenwriter
- Writing career
- Language: English
- Years active: 2015–present
- Genres: Young adult Fantasy
- Notable work: Red Queen
- Notable awards: 2015 Goodreads Choice Awards Best Debut Novel and 2015 Buxtehude Bull

Victoria Aveyard (born July 27, 1990) is an American writer of young adult and fantasy fiction and screenplays. She is known for her fantasy novel Red Queen. Aveyard wrote the novel a year after graduating from University of Southern California's screenwriting program in 2012. Sony Pictures teamed up with her to write spec screenplay Eternal.

== Early life ==
Aveyard was born on July 27, 1990, and raised in a small town in Western Massachusetts. Her parents are public school teachers. She moved to California at the age of eighteen after she was accepted into the University of Southern California, where she studied screenwriting. She is of Scottish and Italian descent and resides in Santa Monica, where she lives with her husband and dog. Her surname originates from Dewsbury in Yorkshire.

== Career ==
Aveyard finished her first novel, Red Queen, after she graduated from college. She was inspired to write Red Queen after she graduated from college with a lot of student loan debt and did not see any way to get out of it. Aveyard did not traditionally query; she signed with Suzie Townsend after she heard about her work when she was at USC's writing program. Red Queen was published in 2015 and was met with positive reviews, including praise for its storyline and diversity within the characters and plot twists. Red Queen was the recipient of the Goodreads Choice Award for Debut Goodreads Author. Three sequels and one prequel came after. Originally, Red Queen was planned to be a film franchise with Universal Pictures and Elizabeth Banks directing. In 2021, it was announced that the project will be a television series with Peacock, with Banks directing and appearing in a recurring role. Before production even began, Aveyard announced on Instagram that the series was renewed for a second season. Aveyard also wrote the pilot script for Red Queen.

In 2021, Aveyard released another novel called Realm Breaker which has reached number one on The New York Times Best Sellers list for young adult hardcover books.

== Bibliography ==
=== Red Queen ===
- Red Queen (2015)
- Glass Sword (2016)
- King's Cage (2017)
- War Storm (2018)
- Broken Throne (2019) (short story collection)

==== Novellas ====
- Cruel Crown (2016, collects both the novellas Queen Song and Steel Scars)
  - Queen Song (2015)
  - Steel Scars (2016)

=== Realm Breaker ===
- Realm Breaker (2021)
- Blade Breaker (2022)
- Fate Breaker (2024)

=== The Lyrian Sea ===
- Tempest (2026)
- Tyrant (2027)
