= List of Massachusetts state high school field hockey champions =

Massachusetts field hockey state championships

Below is a list of Massachusetts state high school field hockey champions sanctioned by the Massachusetts Interscholastic Athletic Association since the organization began holding state championship games in 1984.

== State Champions ==
Year	Division 1		Division 2	
1984	Walpole		Rockport	
1985	Southwick		Bellingham	
1986	Athol		Watertown	
1987	Dennis-Yarmouth		Sandwich	
1988	Bellingham		Watertown (2)	
1989	Greenfield		Watertown (3)	
1990	Walpole (2)		Watertown (4)	
1991	Dartmouth		Quabbin	
1992	Notre Dame Academy		Watertown (5)	
1993	Smith Academy		Hopedale	
1994	Walpole (3)		Watertown (6)	
1995	Walpole (4)		Quaboag	
1996	Walpole (5)		Bellingham (2)	
1997	Holliston		Watertown (7)	
1998	Walpole (6)		Quaboag (2)	
1999	Walpole (7)		Greenfield	
2000	Acton-Boxborough		Smith Academy (2)	
2001	Walpole (8)		Watertown (8)	
2002	Notre Dame Academy (2)		Watertown (9)	
2003	Notre Dame Academy (3)		Dedham	
2004	Walpole (9)		Canton	
2005	Notre Dame Academy (4)		Dedham (2)	
2006	Walpole (10)		Canton (2)	
2007	Acton-Boxborough (2)		Quaboag (3)	
2008	Weston		Hopkinton	
2009	Acton-Boxborough (3)		Watertown (10)	
2010	Andover		Watertown (11)	
2011	Andover (2)		Watertown (12)	
2012	Acton-Boxborough (4)		Watertown (13)	
2013	Walpole (11)		Watertown (14)	
2014	Acton-Boxborough (5)		Watertown (15)	
2015	Acton-Boxborough (6)		Watertown (16)	
2016	Walpole (12)		Watertown (17)	
2017	Andover (3)		Watertown (18)	
2018	Somerset-Berkley		Dennis-Yarmouth (2)	
2019	Somerset-Berkley (2)		Dover-Sherborn	
2020	No season due to the COVID-19 pandemic			
Year	Division 1	Division 2	Division 3	Division 4
2021	Andover (4)	Westwood	Watertown (19)	Uxbridge
2022	Andover (5)	Longmeadow	Watertown (20)	Uxbridge (2)
2023	Walpole (13)	Reading	Watertown (21)	Uxbridge (3)
2024	Walpole (14)	Somerset-Berkley (3)	Watertown (22)	Uxbridge (4)
2025	Walpole (15)	Somerset-Berkley (4)	Uxbridge (5)	Dennis-Yarmouth (3)

== Most Championships ==
Rank	School	Number	Years
1	Watertown	22	1986, 1988, 1989, 1990, 1992, 1994, 1997, 2001, 2002, 2009, 2010, 2011, 2012, 2013, 2014, 2015, 2016, 2017, 2021, 2022, 2023, 2024
2	Walpole	15	1984, 1990, 1994, 1995, 1996, 1998, 1999, 2001, 2004, 2006, 2013, 2016, 2023, 2024, 2025
3	Acton-Boxborough	6	2000, 2007, 2009, 2012, 2014, 2015
4	Uxbridge	5	2021, 2022, 2023, 2024, 2025
5	Andover	5	2010, 2011, 2017, 2021, 2022
6	Somerset-Berkley	4	2018, 2019, 2024, 2025
7	Notre Dame Academy	4	1992, 2002, 2003, 2005

== See also ==
- List of Massachusetts state high school baseball champions
- List of Massachusetts state high school football champions
