= List of Massachusetts state high school baseball champions =

Below is a list of Massachusetts state high school baseball champions sanctioned by the Massachusetts Interscholastic Athletic Association since the organization began holding state championship games in 1934.

== State Champions ==
Year	Division 1				
1934	Walpole				
1935	Somerville				
1936	Templeton				
1937	Lynn English				
1938	Brockton				
1939	Palmer				
1940	Belmont				
1941	Somerville (2)				
1942	Turners Falls				
1943	Norwood				
1944	Newton				
1945	No state finals due to travel restraints				
1946	Keith Academy				
1947	Lynn Classical				
1948	Springfield Cathedral				
1949	Pittsfield				
1950	Holyoke				
1951	Somerville (3)				
1952	St. John's				
1953	Holyoke (2)				
1954	Somerville (4)				
1955	Newton (2)				
1956	Everett				
1957	Durfee				
1958	St. Stephen's				
1959	Belmont (2)				
1960	Pittsfield (2)				
1961	Chicopee				
1962	Chicopee (2)				
1963	Chicopee (3)				
1964	Waltham				
1965	Somerville (5)				
1966	Pittsfield (3)				
1967	Westfield				
1968	Springfield Tech				
1969	Springfield Tech (2)				
1970	Springfield Tech (3)				
1971	Durfee (2)				
Year	Division 1	Division 3			
1972	Braintree	St. Joseph's			
1973	Catholic Memorial	Lynn Tech			
1974	North Reading	Quabbin Regional			
1975	Springfield Tech (4)	St. Joseph's (2)			
Year	Division 1	Division 2	Division 3		
1976	St. John's (2)	Grafton	Norwell		
1977	St. Peter's	Tantasqua Regional	West Boylston		
1978	Holyoke (3)	Drury	Frontier Regional		
1979	Chicopee Comp	Somerset	Matignon		
1980	Lynn English (2)	Westborough	Norton		
1981	Brockton (2)	Winthrop	Ware		
1982	No state finals due to Prop. 2				
1983	No state finals due to Prop. 2				
1984	Braintree (2)	Stoughton	Millbury		
1985	Holyoke (4)	Marblehead	Hopkins Academy		
1986	Leominster	Franklin	Oxford		
1987	St. Peter-Marian (2)	Holliston	St. Mary's Lynn		
1988	Leominster (2)	Hamilton-Wenham	St. Mary's Lynn (2)		
1989	Braintree (3)	Salem	Norton (2)		
1990	Milford	Drury (2)	Bishop Connolly		
1991	Andover	Westborough (2)	Narragansett Regional		
1992	Andover (2)	Archbishop Williams	Marblehead (2)		
1993	New Bedford	Clinton	Swampscott		
1994	New Bedford (2)	Bishop Feehan	Pentucket Regional		
1995	Durfee (3)	Stoneham	Archbishop Williams (2)		
1996	Leominster (3)	Reading	Harwich		
1997	Brockton (3)	Middleborough	Amesbury		
1998	New Bedford (3)	Auburn	Bishop Stang		
1999	St. John's Prep	Hudson	Northbridge		
2000	St. John's Prep (2)	Masconomet Regional	Ashland		
2001	Boston College High	Danvers	Nipmuc Regional		
2002	St. John's (3)	Hudson (2)	Nipmuc Regional (2)		
2003	Malden Catholic	Athol	Marian		
2004	Xaverian Brothers	Hopkinton	Bishop Fenwick		
2005	West Springfield	Lincoln-Sudbury	Nipmuc Regional (3)		
2006	Algonquin Regional	Somerset (2)	Harwich (2)		
2007	Lincoln-Sudbury (2)	Oliver Ames	Harwich (3)		
2008	Boston College High (2)	Plymouth North	Westwood		
2009	Boston College High (3)	Auburn (2)	Abington		
Year	Division 1	Division 2	Division 3	Division 4	
2010	Amherst Regional	Northbridge (2)	Norton (3)	Cohasset	
2011	Lincoln-Sudbury (3)	Plymouth North (2)	Newburyport	Cohasset (2)	
2012	Xaverian Brothers (2)	Mahar	North Reading (2)	Georgetown	
2013	Bridgewater-Raynham	Hingham	Middleborough (2)	Lowell Catholic	
Year	Division 1A	Division 1	Division 2	Division 3	Division 4
2014	Newton North (3)	Leominster (4)	Masconomet Regional (2)	Bellingham	Pope John Paul II
2015	Braintree (4)	Norwood (2)	Middleborough (3)	St. Mary's Lynn (3)	St. John Paul II (2)
2016	Braintree (5)	West Springfield (2)	Dighton-Rehoboth	Groton-Dunstable	St. John Paul II (3)
2017	St. John's (4)	Taconic	Greater New Bedford	Auburn (3)	St. Mary's Westfield
2018	Franklin (2)	Needham	North Attleborough	Austin Prep	Archbishop Williams (3)
2019	North Andover	Taunton	St. Mary's Lynn (4)	Taconic (2)	Manchester-Essex
2020	No season due to the COVID-19 pandemic				
2021	No tournament due to COVID-19	Xaverian Brothers (3)	St. Mary's Lynn (5)	Taconic (3)	Hopkins Academy (2)
Year	Division 1	Division 2	Division 3	Division 4	Division 5
2022	Taunton (2)	Milton	Austin Prep (2)	Manchester Essex (2)	Mount Greylock
2023	Taunton (3)	Milton (2)	Oakmont	Seekonk	Bourne
2024	Boston College High (4)	Plymouth North (3)	Oakmont (2)	Seekonk (2)	English High
2025	Chelmsford	Walpole (2)	North Reading (3)	Millbury (2)	Pioneer Valley
2026	Catholic Memorial (2)	King Philip	Middleborough (4)	Seekonk (3)	Georgetown

== Most Championships ==
Rank	School	Number	Years
1	St. Mary's Lynn	5	1987, 1988, 2017, 2019, 2021
2	Braintree	5	1972, 1984, 1989, 2015, 2016
3	Somerville	5	1935, 1941, 1951, 1954, 1965
4	Boston College High	4	2001, 2008, 2009, 2024
5	St. John's	4	1952, 1976, 2002, 2017
6	Leominster	4	1986, 1988, 1996, 2014
7	Holyoke	4	1950, 1953, 1978, 1985
8	Springfield Tech	4	1968, 1969, 1970, 1975

== See also ==
- List of Massachusetts state high school football champions
- List of Massachusetts state high school field hockey champions
