= Abiel Pearson House =

Historic house in Massachusetts, United States

- U.S. National Register of Historic Places
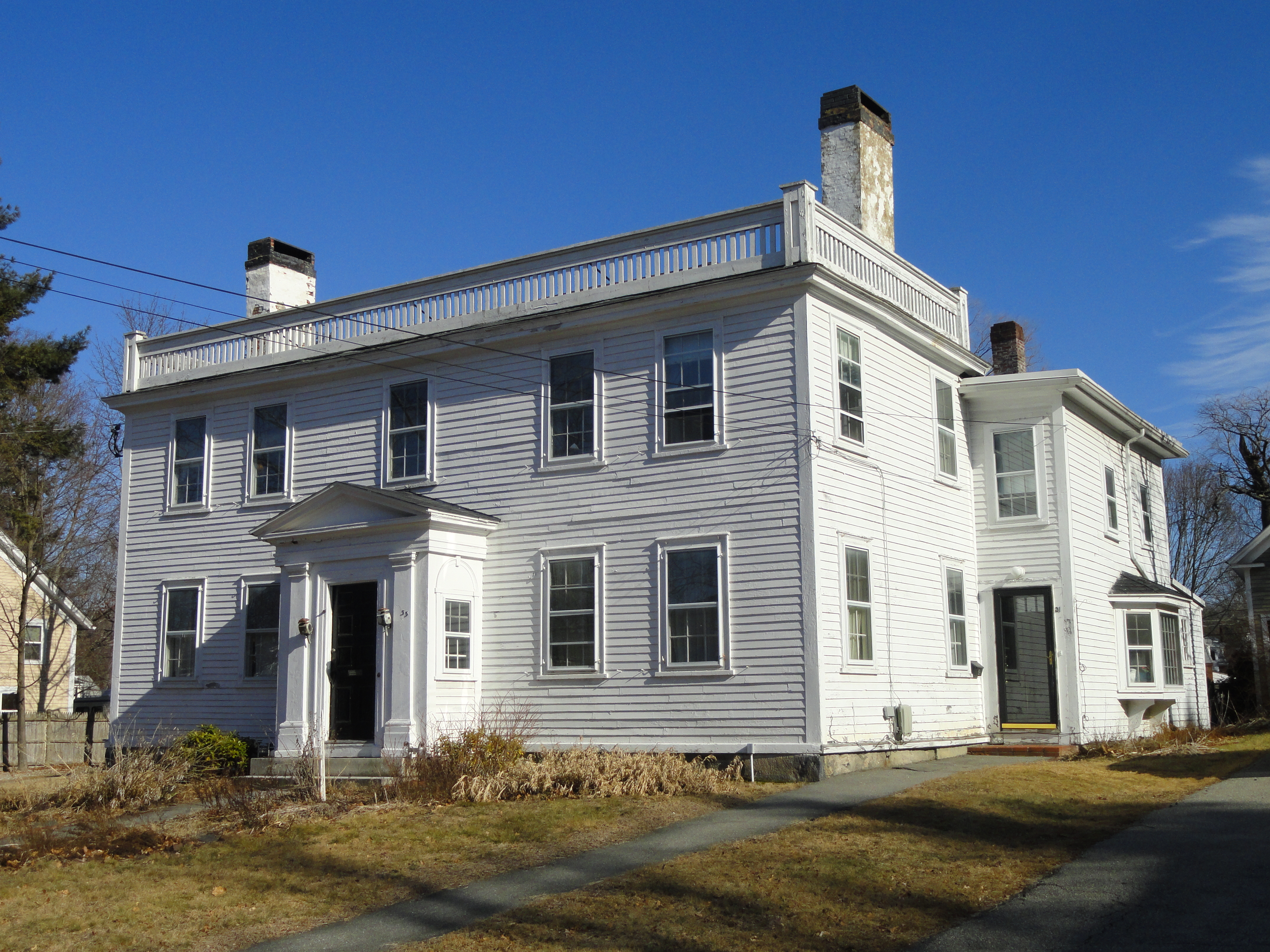

- Location within Massachusetts Location within the United States
- Location: 33 High Street, Andover, Massachusetts
- Coordinates: 42°39′36″N 71°8′29″W
- Built: 1807
- Architectural style: Federal
- MPS: Town of Andover MRA
- NRHP reference No.: 82004807
- Added to NRHP: June 10, 1982

The Abiel Pearson House is a historic house in Andover, Massachusetts. This Federal style two story house was built c. 1807 for Doctor Abiel Pearson, originally from Byfield, Massachusetts, at the start of High Street near the town center. It was purchased in 1829, two years after Pearson's death by Benjamin Punchard, who lived in the house until 1846. Punchard moved the house to its present location in order to build a new house (the Benjamin Punchard House) at the same location. This house he divided into a two family and rented out. The house was sold to John Harding after Punchard's death in 1852, and remained in the hands of his descendants until 1935. The house features elegant Federal details, agreeably extended with a Greek Revival roof balustrade. The house was listed on the National Register of Historic Places in 1982.

== See also ==
- National Register of Historic Places listings in Andover, Massachusetts
- National Register of Historic Places listings in Essex County, Massachusetts
