= Ipswich High School =

Ipswich High School can refer to:

- Ipswich High School, Suffolk, in Ipswich, Suffolk, England
- Ipswich High School (Massachusetts), in Ipswich, Massachusetts, USA
- Ipswich High School (South Dakota), in Ipswich, South Dakota, USA
- Ipswich State High School, in Brassall, Queensland, Australia
