= Anna Zerilli =

American football placekicker

Anna Zerilli was the first ever female kicker (in 2015) on the boys' Manchester-Essex Hornets team breaking a 60-year-old school record at Manchester-Essex for most points scored (7 points) by a placekicker in a game. She became the first female freshman in American history to score in a Varsity game. She studied at Rockport High School and began training at Cape Ann Kicking Academy with Rick Gonsalves. In 2018 The New England Patriots invited her to kick at Gillette Stadium with Stephen Gostkowski through the NFL network. In fall of 2018 she became the first New England female to sign to play college football; she currently plays for Lake Forest College, and scored the first point ever by a female in a varsity football game for the college on October 26, 2019. She is also the first female to score in a varsity football game in the history of the Midwest Conference. She is 5 feet 3 inches (1.60 m) tall.
