= Hale-Boynton House =

Historic house in Massachusetts, United States

- U.S. National Register of Historic Places
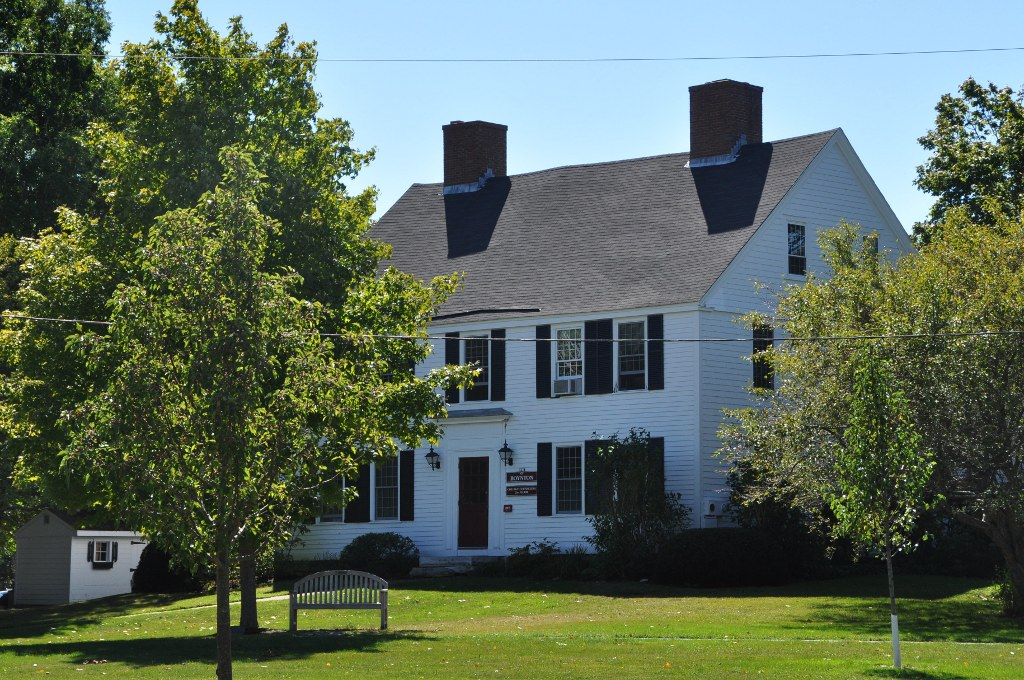

- Location within Massachusetts Location within the United States
- Location: Middle St., Newbury, Massachusetts
- Coordinates: 42°45′5″N 70°54′3″W
- Area: less than one acre
- Built: 1764
- Architectural style: Georgian
- NRHP reference No.: 83000578
- Added to NRHP: April 14, 1983

The Hale-Boynton House is a historic house on Middle Street in Newbury, Massachusetts. The house is now part of the campus of The Governor's Academy, where it is referred to as "Boynton House". It was built in 1764, and is notable for its well-preserved Georgian architecture, and for its association with the inventor E. Moody Boynton. The house was added to the National Register of Historic Places in 1983.

== Description and history ==
The Hale Boynton House is located in Newbury's Byfield area, on the west side of Middle Street north of Elm Street. It is surrounded by more modern buildings that make up part of the campus of The Governor's Academy, a private boarding school founded in 1763. It is 2 1/2 stories in height, built of timber-frame construction, with a side gable roof, two interior brick chimneys, and an exterior finished on the front and rear in clapboards, and on the sides in wooden shingles. The front facade is five bays wide, with the entrance at the center, flanked by pilasters and topped by a transom window and corniced entablature. The interior has an unusual floor plan for the period, with five rooms arrayed around the chimneys. Many original features remain, including raised wooden paneling on the walls and fireplace surrounds, and iron hooks used in cooking.

The house was built in 1764 for Joseph Hale, whose family had owned the land since 1733, operating a tavern that served travelers at the nearby river crossing. Hale and later his son both served as trustees of the academy after its founding, and boarded some of its students here, most notably Admiral Edward Preble. In 1898 the house was acquired by E. Moody Boynton, who was born in Ohio but whose family had deep roots in Byfield. Boynton was an eccentric inventor who became wealthy by patenting the M-shaped sawtooth, but may be best remembered for the Boynton Bicycle Railroad, a type of steam-powered monorail. The house and land were conveyed to the academy by Boynton's widow, and it continues to be used as housing.

== See also ==
- National Register of Historic Places listings in Essex County, Massachusetts
