= Ipswich High School (Massachusetts) =

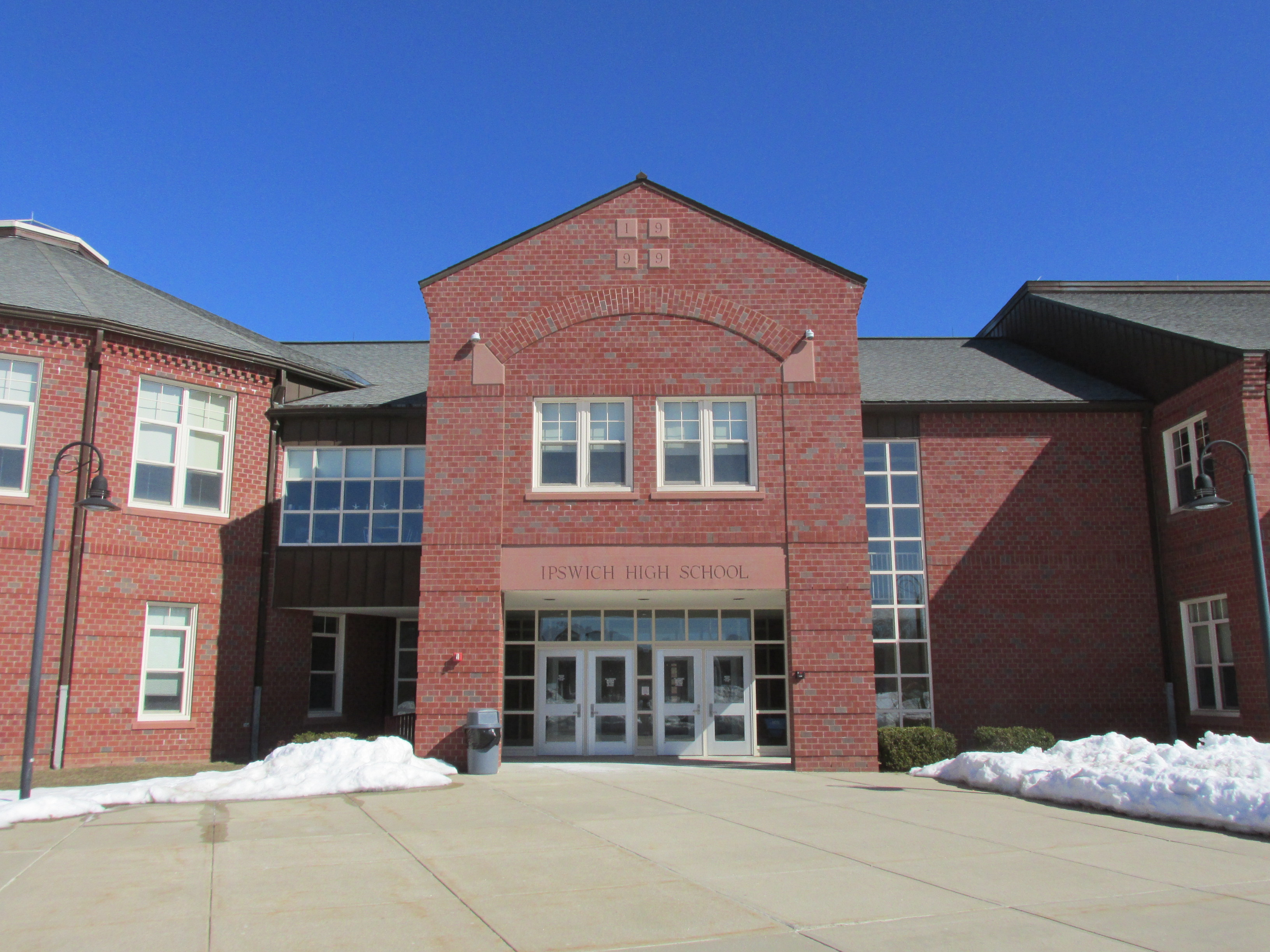
- Ipswich High School

Location
- 134 High Street; Ipswich, Massachusetts 01938; United States; 42°41′19″N 70°51′6″W

Information
- Type: Public; Coeducational
- Established: 1642
- Status: Open
- School district: Ipswich School District
- Principal: Jonathan Mitchell
- Staff: 49.75 (FTE)
- Grades: 9–12
- Enrollment: 447 (2024-2025)
- Student to teacher ratio: 8.98
- Hours in school day: 7:45am-2:21pm (1:17pm on Thursdays)
- Campus size: Medium
- Colors: Orange, white, and black
- Athletics conference: Cape Ann League
- Mascot: Tiger
- Team name: Ipswich Tigers
- Accreditation: New England Association of Schools and Colleges
- Newspaper: The Tiger Transcript
- Communities served: Ipswich, Massachusetts
- Website: ihs.ipsk12.net

Ipswich High School is a four-year public high school in Ipswich, Massachusetts, United States. It had an enrollment of approximately 500 students as of 2024. It is the only high school in the town of Ipswich. Ipswich High School shares a building with Ipswich Middle School.

== Student Life and Demographics ==
In order to graduate from Ipswich High, students must earn 110 credits, and successfully complete 35 credits each year. A core curriculum of English, Social Studies, Mathematics, and Science must be taken every year, with the option to drop science senior year. Two consecutive years of a foreign language (either French or Spanish), are also required. Finally, students must complete four years of physical education, in addition to a semester long course in general health and wellness.

Ipswich High School offers many clubs and activities for all students to participate in. These allow students to take advantage of leadership opportunities, explore their interests, and make their community a better place. Any clubs or activities that do not currently exist at Ipswich High School can be started with approval from the principal, Mr. Mitchell.

== Fine Arts ==
Ipswich High School places a strong emphasis on the fine arts, especially music. Concerts for choral, band, and orchestral ensembles are regularly held at the school's Performing Arts Center. The venue was originally intended to be rented out to local bands and ensembles not affiliated with the school district, but is almost exclusively used for in school performances such as theater. Much of the district's fine arts are funded by a local non-profit, the Ipswich Music, Art, and Drama Association (IMADA). Ipswich High embarks on a quadrennial trip to England, funded in part by IMADA. The school's fine arts director, Michael Coelho, has been twice nominated for a Grammy in Music Education.

== Athletics ==
Ipswich High School is a member of the Cape Ann League and is a Division II competitor in the Massachusetts Interscholastic Athletic Association. Ipswich offers sports in the fall, winter, and spring seasons.

Ipswich offers sports in the fall, winter, and spring seasons. Fall sports are cheerleading, cross country, field hockey, football (now co-op at Triton), golf, soccer, and volleyball. Winter sports are basketball, gymnastics (co-op at Gloucester), ice hockey (co-op at Rockport), indoor track, swim, and wrestling (co-op at Georgetown). In the spring, baseball, lacrosse, softball, tennis, and track and field are played.
