= Cape Ann League =

US high school athletic conference

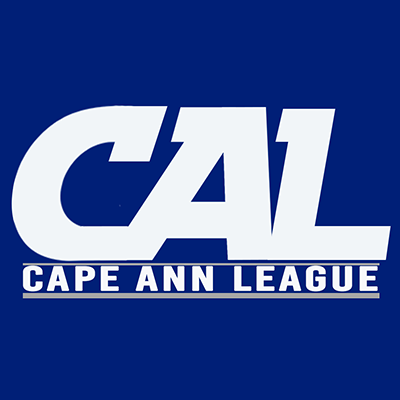
- Conference: Massachusetts Interscholastic Athletic Association
- Founded: 1972
- Sports fielded: 24; men's: 12; women's: 11; coeducational: 1
- Division: Division III & IV
- No. of teams: 12
- Region: Massachusetts; North Shore
- Website: https://www.mascores.com?l=cal

The Cape Ann League (CAL) is a high school athletic conference in District 5 of the Massachusetts Interscholastic Athletic Association. The league is based mainly on or around Cape Ann, a small cape on the North Shore of Massachusetts.

== Member schools ==
The CAL has twelve member schools in northeastern Massachusetts. The schools in the Cape Ann League are split into two divisions: Cape Ann Kinney and Cape Ann Baker.

The Kinney division incorporates the schools with six largest enrollment within the league and compete in Division 3 for football. The Baker division incorporates the schools with six smallest enrollment within the league and compete in Division 4 for football.

=== Current members ===
Institution	Location	Founded	Nickname	Enrollment (2024-25)
Kinney Division (Large)
Essex North Shore Agricultural and Technical School	Hathorne	2014	Hawks	1,830
Lynnfield High School	Lynnfield	1960	Pioneers	588
Newburyport High School	Newburyport	1831	Clippers	743
North Reading High School	North Reading	1955	Hornets	652
Pentucket Regional High School	West Newbury	1954	Panthers	578
Triton Regional High School	Byfield	1971	Vikings	538
Baker Division (Small)
Amesbury High School	Amesbury	1882	Red Hawks	481
Georgetown Middle/High School	Georgetown		Royals	268
Hamilton-Wenham Regional High School	South Hamilton	1936	Generals	448
Ipswich High School	Ipswich	1642	Tigers	447
Manchester Essex Regional High School	Manchester-by-the-Sea	2000	Hornets	392
Rockport High School	Rockport	1865	Vikings	221
Boys Tennis Only
Mystic Valley Regional Charter School	Malden		Eagles	

Cape Ann League
Locations of Cape Ann League members, 2021-2022 Kinney (large) Division member Baker (small) Division member

=== Former members ===
Institution	Location	Founded	Nickname	Joined	Left	Current Conference
Masconomet Regional High School	Boxford	1960	Chieftains		2020	Northeastern Conference
North Andover High School	North Andover		Scarlet Knights	1971	2012	Merrimack Valley Conference
Saugus Middle/High School	Saugus	1906	Sachems	2013	2014	Northeastern Conference
Wilmington High School	Wilmington		Wildcats	1994	2011	Middlesex League

== History ==
Longtime Secretary and Treasurer of the Cape Ann League, Dick Baker, steps down after 41 years with the Cape Ann League. Baker also spent 18 years with the Northeastern Conference.

Beginning in the 2011-12 season, Wilmington High School moved to the Middlesex League along with Arlington High School moving from the Dual County League.

Prior to the 2012-13 school year, North Andover High School left the Cape Ann League after forty years to join the Merrimack Valley Conference (MVC).

On December 14, 2012, Saugus High School announced on their Twitter account that they would join the Cape Ann League, leaving the Northeastern Conference for more success in their school athletics. On January 18, 2013, the move was approved by the Massachusetts Interscholastic Athletic Association.

At the conclusion of Saugus High School's first season in the Cape Ann League, they requested to rejoin the Northeastern Conference due to geographic and traveling issues. The rejoin was approved by both high school conferences allowing Saugus High School to return to the Northeastern Conference. All sports would play in the Northeastern Conference, with the exception of football which would become independent for the 2014 fall season. The Saugus Sachems football team would play opponents from both the Cape Ann League and Northeastern Conference.

Beginning in the 2023-2024 school year, Essex Tech became a member of the Cape Ann League after many years playing in the Commonwealth Athletic Conference.

With the addition of Essex Tech becoming a member of the Kinney Division, Lynnfield High School moved to the Baker Division in the 2024-2025 school year.

== Sports ==
The Cape Ann League sponsors championship competition in twelve men's, eleven women's, and one coed MIAA sanctioned sports.

Teams in CAL Conference competition
Sport	Men's	Women's
Baseball	12	-
Basketball	12	11
Cross country	11	11
Field hockey	-	12
Football	9	-
Golf	12	-
Gymnastics	-	2
Ice Hockey	7	-
Lacrosse	10	8
Soccer	12	12
Softball	-	12
Swimming & Diving	7	
Tennis	10	11
Indoor Track & Field	11	11
Outdoor Track & Field	9	9
Volleyball	-	6
Wrestling	5	-

=== Coed sponsored sports by school ===
School	Swimming & Diving	Total CAL Sports
Amesbury	✗	0
Essex Tech	✗	0
Georgetown	✗	0
Hamilton-Wenham	✓	1
Ipswich	✓	1
Lynnfield	✓	1
Manchester Essex	✓	1
Newburyport	✗	0
North Reading	✓	1
Pentucket	✗	0
Rockport	✗	0
Triton	✓	1
Totals	7	7

=== Men's sponsored sports by school ===
School	Baseball	Basketball	Cross Country	Football	Golf	Ice Hockey	Lacrosse	Soccer	Tennis	Track & Field (Indoor)	Track & Field (Outdoor)	Wrestling	Total CAL Sports
Amesbury	✓	✓	✓	✓	✓	✓	✗	✓	✓	✓	✓	✗	10
Essex Tech	✓	✓	✓	✓	✓	✓	✓	✓	✗	✓	✓	✗	11
Georgetown	✓	✓	✓	✗	✓	✗	✓	✓	✗	✓	✗	✓	9
Hamilton-Wenham	✓	✓	✓	✓	✓	✗	✓	✓	✓	✓	✓	✓	12
Ipswich	✓	✓	✓	✗	✓	✗	✓	✓	✓	✓	✓	✗	9
Lynnfield	✓	✓	✓	✓	✓	✓	✓	✓	✓	✓	✓	✓	12
Manchester Essex	✓	✓	✓	✓	✓	✗	✓	✓	✓	✓	✗	✗	9
Newburyport	✓	✓	✓	✓	✓	✓	✓	✓	✓	✓	✓	✗	11
North Reading	✓	✓	✓	✓	✓	✓	✓	✓	✓	✓	✓	✗	11
Pentucket	✓	✓	✓	✓	✓	✓	✓	✓	✓	✓	✓	✓	12
Rockport	✓	✓	✗	✗	✓	✓	✗	✓	✓	✗	✗	✗	5
Triton	✓	✓	✓	✓	✓	✓	✓	✓	✓	✓	✓	✓	12
Totals	12	12	11	9	12	7	10	12	10	11	9	5	122

=== Women's sponsored sports by school ===
School	Basketball	Cross Country	Field Hockey	Gymnastics	Lacrosse	Soccer	Softball	Tennis	Track & Field (Indoor)	Track & Field (Outdoor)	Volleyball	Total CAL Sports
Amesbury	✓	✓	✓	✗	✗	✓	✓	✓	✓	✓	✗	8
Essex Tech	✓	✓	✓	✓	✓	✓	✓	✗	✓	✓	✓	10
Georgetown	✓	✓	✓	✓	✓	✓	✓	✗	✓	✗	✓	9
Hamilton-Wenham	✓	✓	✓	✓	✓	✓	✓	✓	✓	✓	✓	11
Ipswich	✓	✓	✓	✓	✓	✓	✓	✓	✓	✓	✗	10
Lynnfield	✓	✓	✓	✓	✓	✓	✓	✓	✓	✓	✓	11
Manchester Essex	✓	✓	✓	✓	✓	✓	✓	✓	✓	✗	✗	9
Newburyport	✓	✓	✓	✗	✓	✓	✓	✓	✓	✓	✗	9
North Reading	✓	✓	✓	✗	✓	✓	✓	✓	✓	✓	✓	10
Pentucket	✓	✓	✓	✓	✓	✓	✓	✓	✓	✓	✓	11
Rockport	✗	✗	✓	✗	✗	✓	✓	✗	✗	✗	✗	3
Triton	✓	✓	✓	✗	✓	✓	✓	✓	✓	✓	✓	10
Totals	11	11	12	7	10	12	12	10	11	9	6	111

== State Championships ==
Below is a list of state championships for sports sanctioned by the Massachusetts Interscholastic Athletic Association won by schools while they were members of the Cape Ann league

=== Football ===
Note: From 1972 to 2012, football state championships were separated by region, so there would be multiple champions from each division. From 1972 to 1977 and from 1997 to 2008, it was split between Eastern Mass and Central/Western Mass and there would be two champions in each division. From 1978 to 1996 and from 2009 to 2012 Central and Western Mass split so there would be three champions in each division. In 2013 everything was combined and therefore only allowed one state champion per division.

- Newburyport - 1975, 1976 D3 Eastern: 1995 D4B Eastern; 1997 D4A Eastern
- Ipswich - 1977 D3 Eastern; 1991, 1992 D4B Eastern; 2006 D3A Eastern
- Manchester Essex - 1981, 1982 D5 Eastern; 1999 D6A Eastern; 2008 D4 Eastern
- North Andover - 1994 D4A Eastern
- Pentucket - 1999 D4A Eastern
- Georgetown - 2000 D6A Eastern
- Amesbury - 2008 D3A Eastern
- North Reading - 2022 D5

=== Cross Country ===
==== Boys ====
- Newburyport - 2018 D2

==== Girls ====
- Newburyport - 1995, 1997, 2001 D2
- Hamilton-Wenham - 1999, 2000, 2008, 2013, 2014 D2

=== Field Hockey ===
- Rockport - 1984 D2

=== Fall Volleyball ===
- North Reading - 2007 D3
- Ipswich - 2021-2024 D4

=== Soccer ===
==== Boys ====
- Masconomet - 1996, 2013 D2
- Newburyport - 2022 D3
- Lynnfield - 2023 D4

==== Girls ====
- Masconomet - 1989 D2
- Lynnfield - 2003, 2004 (co-champs with Sutton High School) D3
- Newburyport - 2007, 2008, 2013 D3
- Hamilton-Wenham - 2021 D4

=== Fall Golf ===
- Lynnfield - 1999 D3
- Wilmington - 2000 D3
- Masconomet - 2011 D2

=== Basketball ===
==== Boys ====
- North Andover - 1974, 1975 D2
- Lynnfield - 2000 D4
- Newburyport - 2000 D3
- Ipswich - 2005 D4
- Hamilton-Wenham - 2015 D4

==== Girls ====
- Ipswich - 1980 D3; 1995 D4
- Masconomet - 1996 D2
- Pentucket - 2012 D3; 2019 D2
- Amesbury - 2022 D4

=== Gymnastics ===
- Masconomet - 2019

=== Ice Hockey ===
==== Boys ====
- Lynnfield - 1996 D3
- Newburyport - 2009 D2

=== Indoor Track & Field ===
==== Boys ====
- North Andover - 1977 Class B
- Hamilton-Wenham - 2009, 2010 D4
- Newburyport - 2011-2013, 2022 D4; 2014-2016 D5
- Amesbury - 2020 D5

==== Girls ====
- Ipswich - 2001, 2002 Class C

=== Baseball ===
- North Reading - 1974 D1; 2012 D3
- Hamilton-Wenham - 1988 D2
- Pentucket - 1994 D3
- Amesbury - 1997 D3
- Masconomet - 2000, 2014 D2
- Georgetown - 2012, 2026 D4
- Manchester Essex - 2019, 2022 D4

=== Softball ===
- Hamilton-Wenham - 1980 D2
- Lynnfield - 1985 D3
- Amesbury - 1988, 1989, 1997, 2000 D3; 2022 D4
- North Reading - 1999, 2007 D3

=== Outdoor Track & Field ===
==== Boys ====
- Newburyport - 2022, 2026 D4
- Pentucket - 2023 D5
- Amesbury - 2023 D6

==== Girls ====
- Newburyport - 2023 D4
- North Reading - 2026 D5

=== Lacrosse ===
==== Boys ====
- Ipswich - 2003, 2017 D3

==== Girls ====
- Newburyport - 2014 D2; 2023 D3

=== Tennis ===
==== Boys ====
- Manchester Essex - 1983, 1998 D2
- Hamilton-Wenham - 2009 D3
- Mystic Valley - 2026 D4

==== Girls ====
- Lynnfield - 1992, 1997-1999, D2; 2014 D3
- Manchester Essex - 1993, 1995, 1996, 2000, 2001 D2; 2011, 2013, 2018 D3; 2026 D4
- Newburyport - 2022, 2023 D3
- Hamilton-Wenham - 2022, 2023 D4
