= Benjamin Punchard House =

Historic building in Massachusetts, US

- U.S. National Register of Historic Places
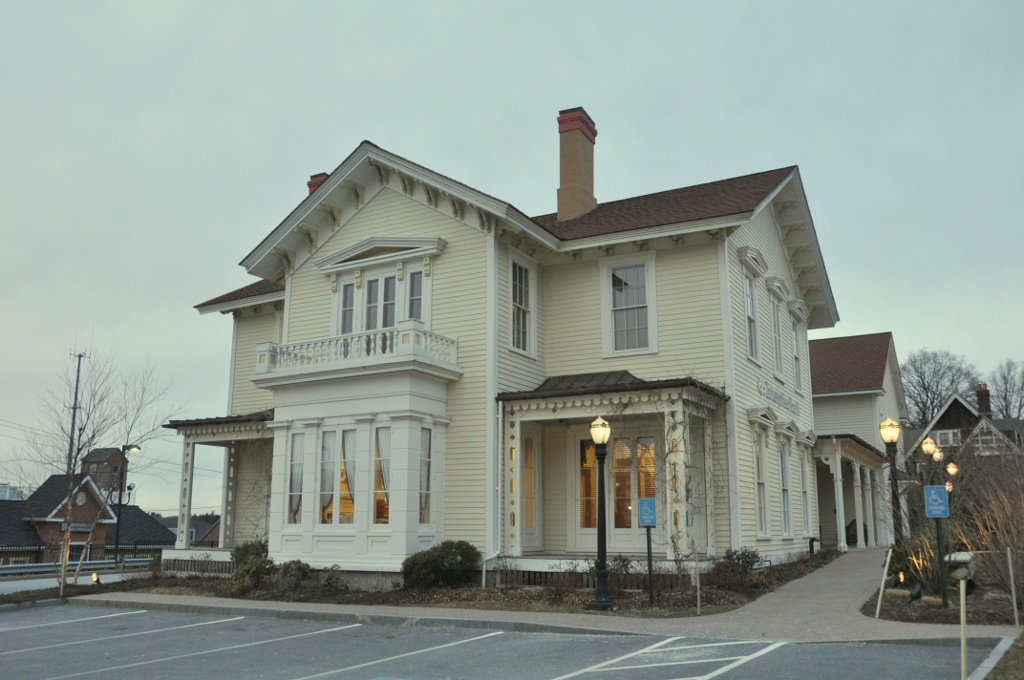

- Location within Massachusetts Location within the United States
- Location: 8 High Street, Andover, Massachusetts
- Coordinates: 42°39′26″N 71°8′29″W
- Built: 1846
- Architectural style: Italianate
- MPS: Town of Andover MRA
- NRHP reference No.: 82004801
- Added to NRHP: June 10, 1982

The Benjamin Punchard House is a historic house in Andover, Massachusetts. Located in the center of Andover, it now houses a bank. The house was built in 1846 by Benjamin Punchard, a successful merchant and shopkeeper. Punchard built the house on the site of a Federal style house he had previously occupied, which was moved to 33 High Street, and is known as the Abiel Pearson House. The house he designed has a number of distinctive characteristics, include a number of early Italianate details. Punchard died a wealthy man, and the town's high school was named for him.

== See also ==
- National Register of Historic Places listings in Andover, Massachusetts
- National Register of Historic Places listings in Essex County, Massachusetts
