= Old Rockport High School =

- U.S. National Register of Historic Places
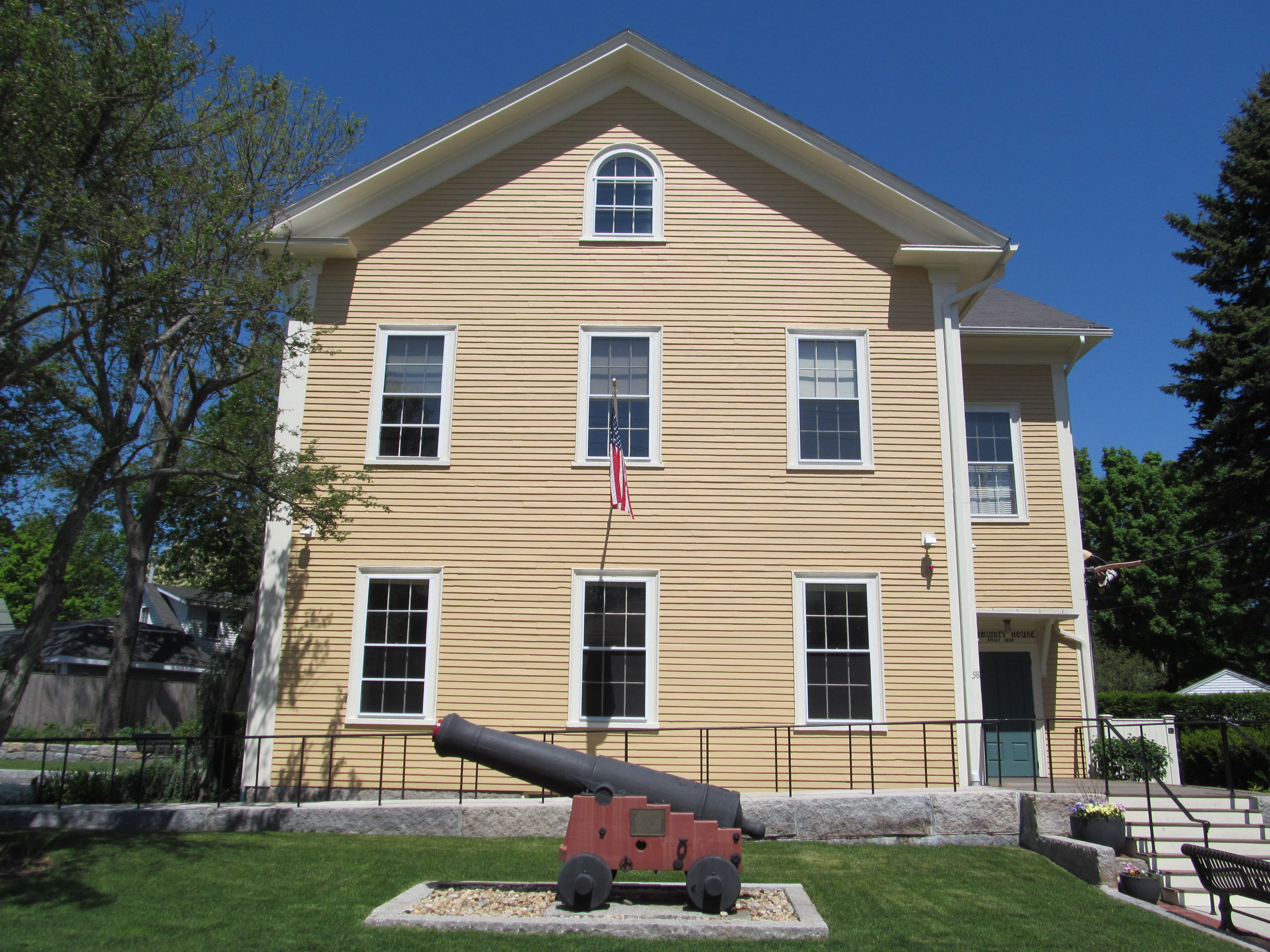
- Old Rockport High School

- Location within Massachusetts Location within the United States
- Location: Rockport, Massachusetts
- Coordinates: 42°39′19″N 70°37′21″W
- Built: 1865
- Architectural style: Italianate
- NRHP reference No.: 04000424
- Added to NRHP: May 12, 2004

The Old Rockport High School, now the Rockport Community House, is a historic school building at 58 Broadway in Rockport, Massachusetts. The 2 1/2-story wood-frame building was built in 1865, with Italianate styling, and served as the town's first public high school until 1926. Three years later it was reopened as a community center, a role it continues to fulfil today.

The main portion of the building is a rectangular block that is minimally styled in with nominally Italianate features, such as a gable end returns and corner trim. The front facade originally had two separate entrances (one for boys, one for girls), but these have been replaced by windows. There is a two-story addition on the side of the building, and two further additions on the rear, all added in the 19th century. The main entrance to the building is now made through the side addition. The interior is dominated by decorative features that date to c. 1900. The first floor front classroom still contains a number of details from that time, including wooden floors, benches, and blackboards, although the latter have been covered over.

The building when first built was only a single story. Due to growing enrollment, the building was raised in 1869 and a new first floor built. In 1890 the school was again increased in size, adding the first of the rear additions to accommodate more students as well as labs for chemistry and physics, although adequate facilities for those classes were not added until 1908. The side addition was added in 1900 to provide a stairway, making additional room in the main part of the building. Continued overcrowding and issues with the age and inadequacy of its physical plant led to the construction of a new high school in 1926.

The building was listed on the National Register of Historic Places in 2004.

== See also ==
- National Register of Historic Places listings in Essex County, Massachusetts
