= Weston High School (Massachusetts) =

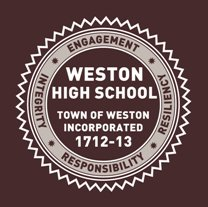

Location
- 444 Wellesley Street; Weston, Massachusetts 02493; United States; 42°20′20.0″N 71°18′16″W

Information
- Type: Public high school
- School district: Weston Public Schools
- Faculty: 57 (FTE)
- Grades: 9–12
- Enrollment: 658 (2024-25)
  - Grade 9: 155
  - Grade 10: 167
  - Grade 11: 167
  - Grade 12: 169
- Student to teacher ratio: 11.3
- Colors: Maroon, Gray and White
- Athletics conference: Dual County League
- Mascot: Wildcats
- Team name: Wildcats, Red Tide (Swimming) Wayland-Weston Crew (Rowing)
- Website: Weston High School

Weston High School is a high school (grades 9–12) in Weston, Massachusetts, United States, a suburb 12 miles west of Boston. The school is located at 444 Wellesley Street in Weston. During the 2024-2025 school year, it had 658 students.

== History ==
Between the end of WWII in 1945 and 1970, the "Boomer" generation, the number of school-age children in Weston increased 363%, from 635 students to 2,937. The town embarked on 25-year school building program resulting in five new school complexes. After a devastating fire in 1948 destroyed the roofing and interior of the new Weston High School, the building was rebuilt as an elementary school and a new replacement high school was commissioned.

This new high school, which was located near Weston Town Center by the current Weston Public Library, Country and Woodland Elementary Schools, was renowned as the "architectural achievement of the century" by the Boston Herald when it opened in January 1950. The nation's first million-dollar public building, Weston High School offered resources and technologies never before seen in a public school. Revolutionary architecture and layout of the school allowed for new teaching and class organization methods. The building has since been torn down due to the building of the new Field School, but it served as the Field School until the 2014–2015 school year.

In 1961, the current Weston High School was built as one of the most expensive schools in the nation at $8,930,001 (1961 dollars). This building is the fifth public high school in Weston and is designed to be in active service far longer than many contemporary schools, thanks to constant renovation and a high-quality initial design and build.

== Campus ==
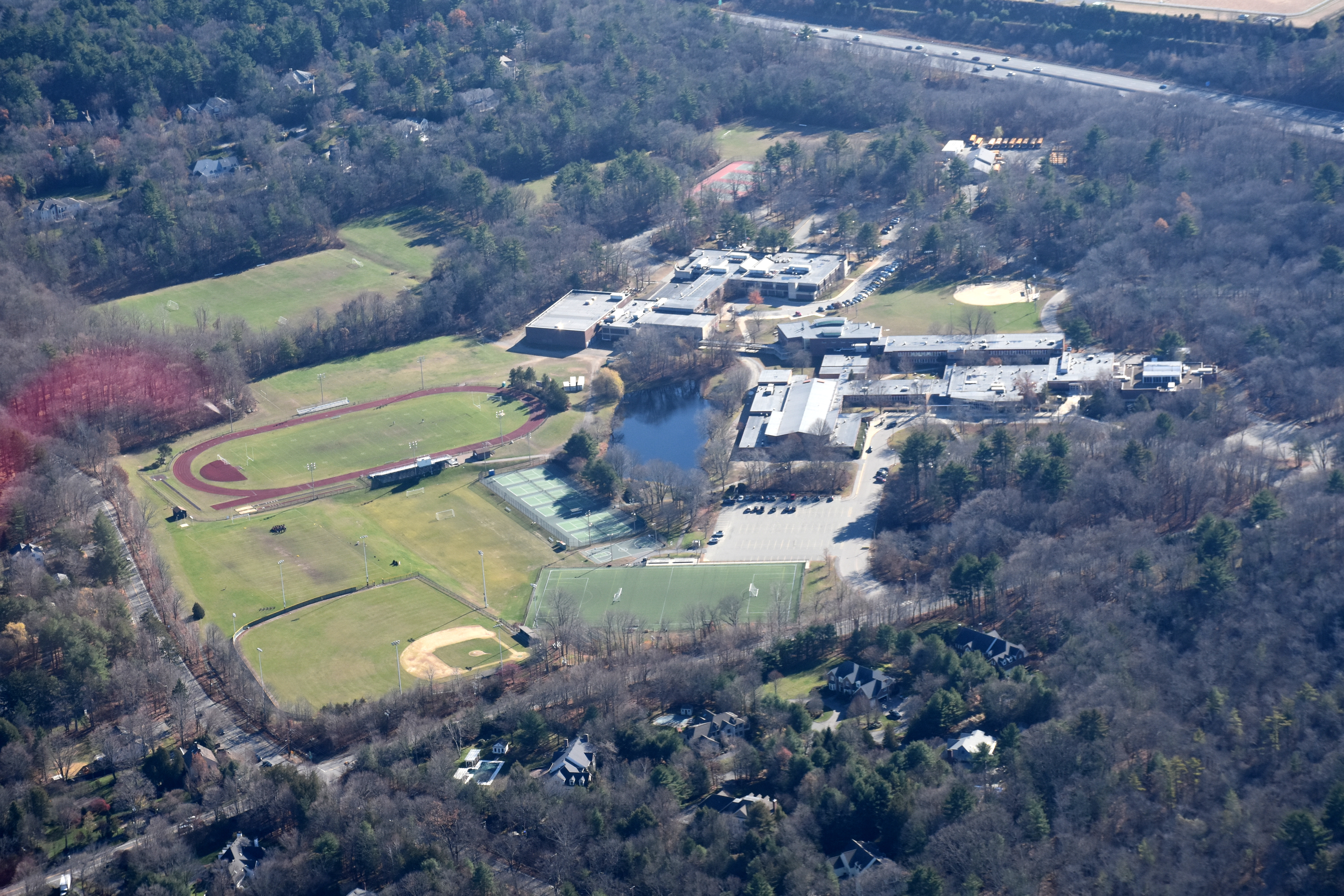
Weston High School campus and athletic fields

Weston High School is a large brick and glass building sitting on a 103-acre campus that is shared with Weston Middle School. The campus includes 14 athletic fields, 10 tennis courts, an indoor pool, sugar house, and fishing pond.

Weston High School, designed and built in 1961 at a cost of $64.3 million (2012 dollars), has been renovated periodically since its construction. The facilities have maintained a modern appearance, marked especially by the extensive use of glass.

The building itself consists of a large gymnasium, weight room, library, theater and tech center, dance studio, music rooms, auditorium, computer labs, and many classrooms. The building is split into different wings for each subject, including English and History, Math and Science, and Language.

A seventh wing (G Wing) has been constructed for the 2012–2013 school year. The 23,000 square foot addition serves as the science wing, housing eight science classrooms, a 58-seat lecture hall, an outdoor amphitheater-style classroom, and copious atrium space. The project is designed for and seeking LEED Silver certification.

== Athletic state championships ==
Weston is known for their athletic success. They are widely regarded as one of the best high school sport schools in Massachusetts, consistently winning multiple state championships each year in a variety of sports. In terms of state championships, the boys' swimming team has seen the most success, winning 27 state titles.

Note: Some state championships from the 2024-2025 school year may not be included because some of the MIAA state championship archives haven't been updated.

Sport	Year(s)
MIAA sanctioned sports
Boys' swimming (27)	1983, 1987, 1988, 1989, 1990, 1993, 1994, 1995, 1997, 1999, 2000, 2001, 2002, 2003, 2004, 2005, 2006, 2007, 2008, 2012, 2013, 2014, 2015, 2016, 2022, 2023, 2024
Boys' tennis (12)	1974, 1975, 1976, 2010, 2011, 2014, 2017, 2018, 2019, 2021, 2022, 2023
Boys' golf (9)	2007, 2008, 2010, 2013, 2014, 2015, 2016, 2022, 2023
Boys' indoor track (5)	1973, 1991, 1997, 2019, 2025
Girls' indoor track (4)	1997, 1998, 2022, 2023
Girls' soccer (4)	1997, 1998, 2010, 2012
Football (3)	1991, 1996, 1998
Girls' tennis (3)	1978, 2010, 2019
Boys' basketball (2)	1955, 1998
Girls' swimming (2)	2015, 2024
Field Hockey (1)	2008
Boys' soccer (1)	2009
Boys' lacrosse (1)	2011
Girls' cross country (1)	2022
Boys' cross country (1)	1990
Girls' outdoor track (1)	2022
Boys' outdoor track (1)	2025
Girls' volleyball (1)	2023
Baseball (0)	
Softball (0)	
Girls' lacrosse (0)	
Girls' golf (0)	
Girls' basketball (0)	
Girls' alpine skiing (0)	
Boys' alpine skiing (0)	
Boys' rugby (0)	
Girls' rugby (0)	
Girls' gymnastics (0)	
Wrestling (0)	
Other sports & Co-op's
Boys' ice hockey (Co-op) (1)	2024
Girls' ice hockey (Co-op) (0)	
Rowing/Crew (?)	

== Rankings ==
The school is accredited by the New England Association of Schools and Colleges. In 2024, Boston Magazine ranked Weston High School #2 in the Boston area, and U.S. News & World Report ranked the school #12 in Massachusetts (#7 excluding exam and charter schools), and #328 in the United States. In 2025, Niche ranked Weston High School #2 of 365 public high schools in Massachusetts (#1 excluding exam and charter schools) and #66 of 20,733 public high schools in the United States.

== Sports ==
Weston competes in the Dual County League, which includes Acton-Boxborough Regional High School, Bedford High School, Concord-Carlisle High School, Lincoln-Sudbury Regional High School, Newton South High School, Waltham High School, Wayland High School, and Westford Academy. The athletics department is headed by Athletic Director Mike McGrath.

During the 2023-2024 school year, Weston High School fielded athletic teams in 22 sports during three seasons. Winning eight state championships and 11 Dual County League championships, the athletic program was recognized as the second best in Massachusetts. More than 50 percent of the school’s student body participated in each of the three sports seasons.

== Demographics ==
According to the Massachusetts Department of Education, the approximate demographic profile of Weston High School is as follows in the 2024-2025 school year:

- White - 55%
- Asian - 24.9%
- Multi-Race - 7.4%
- Hispanic - 6.8%
- Black - 5.5%

== Notable alumni ==
- Grover Norquist, class of 1974, political activist and lobbyist, journalist for The American Spectator, president of Americans for Tax Reform
- John Garabedian, disc jockey, nationally syndicated host of the Open House Party radio show and a veteran in broadcasting for over 60 years
- Alec Sulkin, television writer, writer and producer of Family Guy
- David Frank, founding member of the 1980s R&B group The System.
