= Pentucket Regional School District =

School district in Massachusetts, United States

Address
- 22 Main Street West Newbury, Massachusetts, 01985; United States

District information
- Type: Public
- Motto: A Culture of Continuous Learning
- Grades: K–12
- Established: 1954; 71 years ago
- Superintendent: Justin Bartholomew
- NCES District ID: 2509450

Students and staff
- Enrollment: 2,224 (2020-2021)
- Student–teacher ratio: 12.27
- District mascot: Panther (beginning 2022)
- Colors: Green and White

Other information
- Website: www.prsd.org

Pentucket Regional School District is a three-town regional school district, formed by the towns of Groveland, Merrimac, and West Newbury, Massachusetts. Elementary schools are in each town, and the middle/high school campus is located mostly in West Newbury, Massachusetts, United States and partially in Groveland, Massachusetts, United States. The schools give students the option to learn one of three languages: Spanish, German, and Latin. Its administrative offices are in the middle school at 22 Main Street, West Newbury, Massachusetts.

== District Schools ==
The Pentucket Regional School District comprises the three towns of Groveland, Merrimac, and West Newbury, with the following schools:

- Merrimac:
  - Dr. Frederick Sweetsir Elementary (104 Church St.) (K–2)
  - Helen R. Donaghue Elementary (24 Union St. Ext.) (3–6)
- Groveland:
  - Dr. Elmer S. Bagnall Elementary (253 School St.) (K–6)
- West Newbury:
  - Dr. John C. Page Elementary (694 Main St.) (K–6)
  - Pentucket Regional Middle School (22 Main St.) (7 and 8)
  - Pentucket Regional High School (24 Main St.) (9–12)

A $146.2 million building project to build a combined 7–12 school building to replace the middle and high schools is underway and is expected to be complete by the fall of 2022.

== District Administration ==
The superintendent of the district is Justin Bartholomew, who has held the position since 2018. The assistant superintendent, Brent Conway has held his position since 2018. On January 9, 2018, the former superintendent Jeffrey Mulqueen announced that he would be retiring.
