= Pentucket Regional High School =

Location
- 24 Main Street; West Newbury, Massachusetts 01985; United States
- Coordinates: 42°47′0.5″N 71°0′44.04″W

Information
- Type: Public; Coeducational; Open enrollment
- Established: 1954
- Status: Open
- School district: Pentucket Regional School District
- Principal: Brenda Erhardt
- Teaching staff: 47.92 (FTE)
- Grades: 9–12
- Enrollment: 574 (2023–2024)
- Student to teacher ratio: 11.98
- Hours in school day: 7:35am-2:15pm
- Colors: Green, white, and black
- Athletics conference: Cape Ann League
- Mascot: Panthers
- Team name: Pentucket Panthers
- Rival: Triton Regional High School
- Accreditation: New England Association of Schools and Colleges
- Newspaper: The Pentucket Profile
- Communities served: Groveland, Merrimac, West Newbury
- Website: https://hs.prsd.org/

Pentucket Regional High School (often abbreviated as "PRHS") is a public high school in West Newbury, Massachusetts, United States, which serves the communities of Groveland, Merrimac, and West Newbury. It is the only high school in the Pentucket Regional School District. As of 2023, the new school building was completed. The school's principal is Brenda Erhardt, also as of 2023.

== Athletics ==
Pentucket High School is a member of the Cape Ann League and is a Division III competitor in the Massachusetts Interscholastic Athletic Association. Sports teams are known as the Panthers (previously known as the Sachems). The school colors are green, white, and black. The school's main athletic rival is Triton Regional High School of nearby Byfield, against whom Pentucket plays football on Thanksgiving Day. Pentucket offers sports in the fall, winter, and spring seasons.

Sports:

- Fall
  - Cheerleading
  - Cross Country (Boys)
  - Cross Country (Girls)
  - Field Hockey
  - Football
  - Golf (co-op with Georgetown)
  - Soccer (Boys)
  - Soccer (Girls)
  - Volleyball Co-op
- Winter
  - Basketball (Boys)
  - Basketball (Girls)
  - Cheerleading
  - Ice Hockey (Boys) (co-op with Georgetown)
  - Ice Hockey (Girls) (co-op with North Andover and hosted by Haverhill) - competing in the Merrimack Valley Conference
  - Indoor Track (Boys)
  - Indoor Track (Girls)
  - Wrestling
- Spring
  - Baseball
  - Lacrosse (Boys)
  - Lacrosse (Girls)
  - Softball
  - Tennis (Boys)
  - Tennis (Girls)
  - Track & Field (Boys)
  - Track & Field (Girls)
  - Flag Football (Girls)

== Graduation requirements ==
In order to graduate from Pentucket Regional High School, a total of 105 credits must be earned, including the successful completion of the following categories:

English	20 credits of English Literature, 2.5 credits of Writing Lab
Social Studies	10 credits of American History, 5 credits of World History, 2.5 credits of Citizenship
Math, Science, and Technology	15 credits of Math, 5 credits of Biology, 5 credits of Chemistry or Physical Science, 5 credits of other science or technology, 35 total credits in category
World Languages	10 credits
Wellness	10 credits
Computer Application	2.5 credits in any computer-based course
Fine & Performing Arts	5 credits in visual art, theatre, music
MCAS	Competency Determination in ELA, Math, and Biology
Community Service	40 hours total, minimum of 10 hours per year
