= Georgetown High School (Massachusetts) =

Georgetown Middle/High School
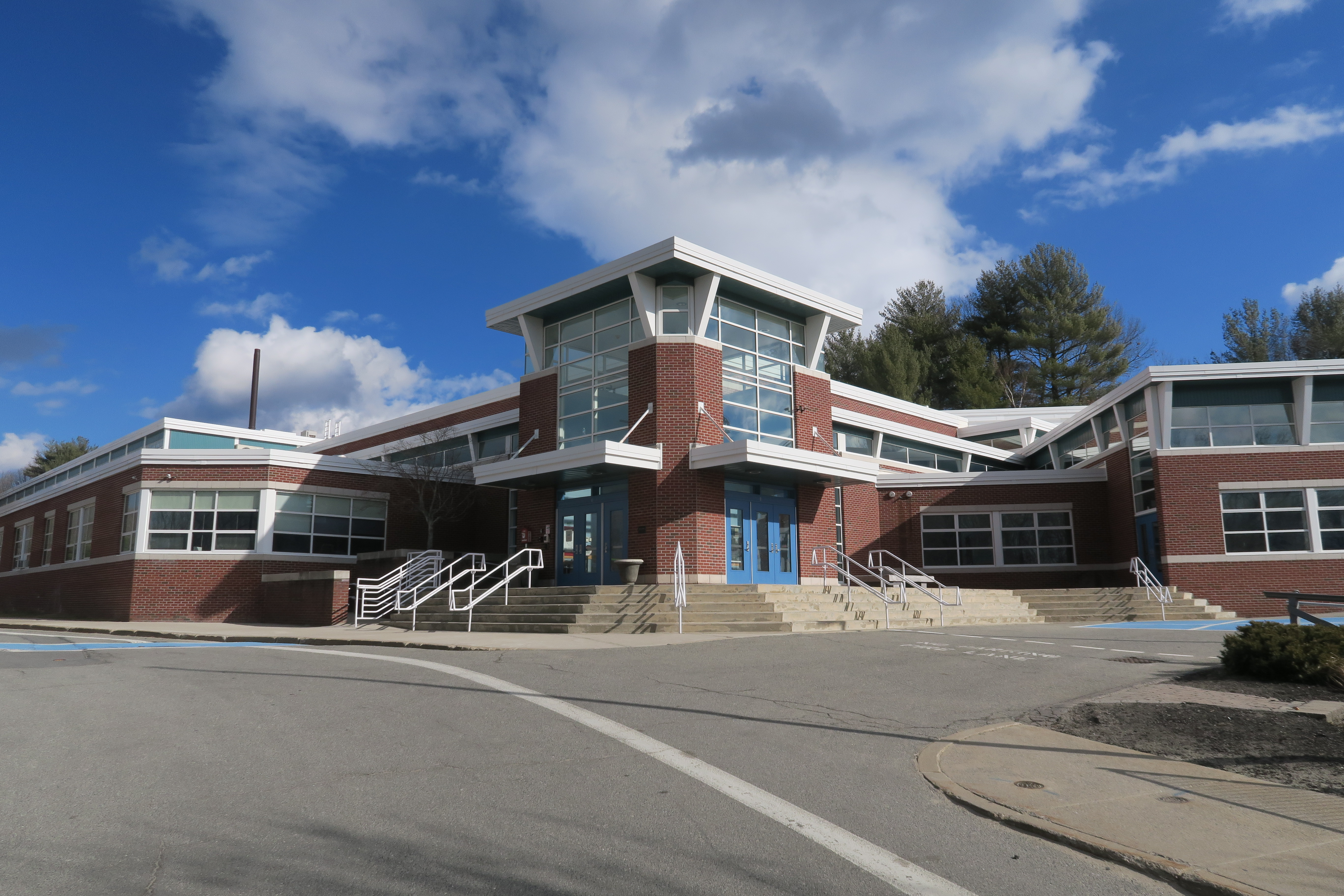
- Georgetown High School

Location
- 11 Winter Street; Georgetown, Massachusetts 01833; United States
- Coordinates: 42.724°N 70.986°W

Information
- Type: Public; Coeducational; Open enrollment
- Status: Open
- School district: Georgetown School District
- Principal: Jeffrey Carovillano
- Teaching staff: 26.22 (FTE)
- Grades: 6–12
- Enrollment: 289 (2023-2024)
- Student to teacher ratio: 11.02
- Colors: Royal blue and White
- Athletics conference: Cape Ann League
- Mascot: Royal lancer
- Team name: Georgetown Royals
- Accreditation: New England Association of Schools and Colleges
- Newspaper: The Royal Press
- Communities served: Georgetown, Massachusetts
- Website: georgetown.k12.ma.us/ghs//

Georgetown Middle/High School is located in Georgetown, Massachusetts, United States. The school is part of the Georgetown Public School District.

Georgetown High School serves students grades 9 through 12, while the middle school section serves grades 6 through 12. The school is the only high school in Georgetown. The middle school is located on the same property as the high school. The school colors are royal blue and white and the mascot are the Royals.

== Graduation requirements ==
A total of 115 credits must be earned. Of this total, 80 credits must be earned in the following "Core Curriculum" areas:

Subject	Credits	Required Classes
English	20	English I, II, III, and IV
Mathematics	20	Example
Wellness/PE	5	Wellness 9,10 & PE 11, 12
Science	15	Example
Social Studies	15	World History II and U.S. History I & II
Business and Computer Technology	5	Creativity, Research, Financial Literacy I & Financial Literacy II

== Athletics ==
Georgetown High School competes in the Cape Ann League, except in football, where they compete in the Commonwealth Athletic Conference, for smaller schools. Their biggest rival is Manchester Essex High School. Some sports teams co-op with other schools: the wrestling teams co-ops with Ipswich High School, track and swimming teams co-op with Triton Regional High School, girls Hockey co-ops with Masconomet Regional High School and boys Hockey and golf with Pentucket Regional High School.

Fall	Winter	Spring
Football (coop with Pentucket Regional High School)	Basketball	Softball
Field Hockey		Baseball
Boys Soccer	Boys Hockey(coop with Pentucket Regional High School)	Boys Lacrosse
Girls Soccer	Girls Hockey(coop with Pentucket Regional High School)	Girls Lacrosse
Cheerleading	Cheerleading	Golf
Cross Country	Indoor Track	Outdoor Track

The 2000 football team won the Division VI Super Bowl vs. Cape Cod Tech by a score of 26-6.

The baseball team won its first Division IV State Championship in 2012 by defeating Harwich by a score of 11–1.

== Clubs and activities ==
The clubs and activities at Georgetown High School include:

- Chess Club
- Student Council
- Drama Club
- Peer Leaders
- Peer Mentors
- Key Club
- Tri-M (Music Honors Society)
- Yearbook Committee
- Co-ed and all-female A cappella clubs
- Northeast Regional Student Advisory Council
- National Honor Society
- DECA
- Dance Team
- Civil Rights Team
- SADD
- Jazz Band
- Quilting Club
- National Art Honor Society
- Anime Club
- Arabic / Middle Eastern Club
