= Triton Regional High School (Massachusetts) =

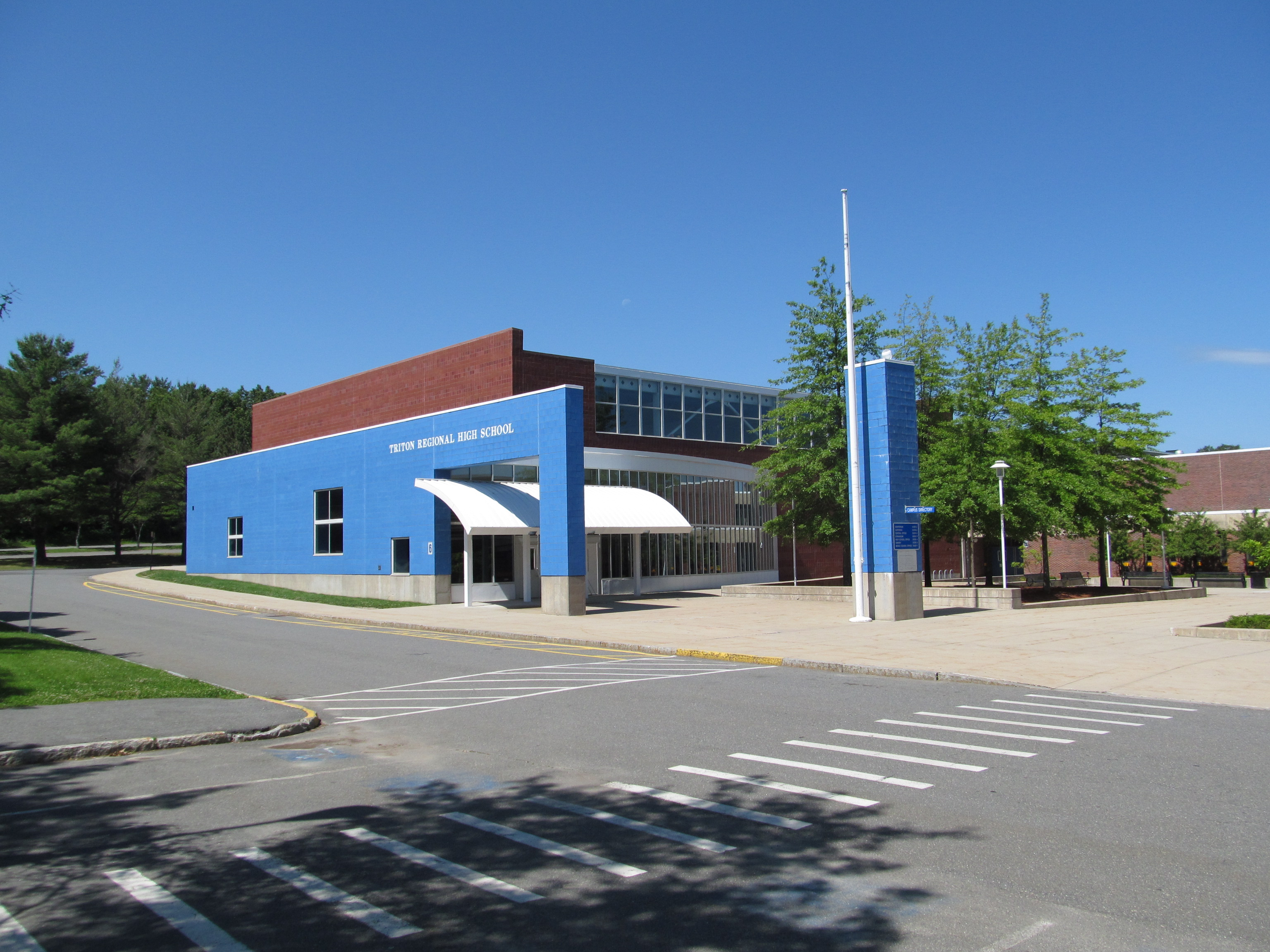
- View of Triton Regional High School.

Location
- 112 Elm Street; Byfield, Massachusetts 01922; United States; 42°44′41″N 70°55′9″W

Information
- Type: Public high school
- Established: 1971
- School district: Triton Regional School District
- Principal: Patrick Kelley
- Teaching staff: 56.90 (FTE)
- Grades: 9–12
- Enrollment: 567 (2023-2024)
- Student to teacher ratio: 9.96
- Colors: Navy Blue, Columbia blue and white
- Athletics conference: Cape Ann League
- Mascot: Vikings
- Rival: Pentucket Regional High School
- Accreditation: NEASC
- Newspaper: Triton Voice
- Communities served: Newbury, Rowley, Salisbury
- Website: ths.tritonschools.org/en-US

Triton Regional High School is a public high school in the village of Byfield within the town of Newbury, Massachusetts. Triton High also serves the nearby towns of Rowley and Salisbury.

== Sports and extracurriculars ==
Home of the Vikings, Triton Regional High School teams sport the colors of blue and white, and compete within the Cape Ann League. The school has a co-op athletic partnership for swimming and track and field with Georgetown High School.

- Fall Sports
  - Cross Country
  - Soccer
  - Field Hockey
  - Football (2016 D3 North Sectional Champions)
  - Volleyball
  - Golf (2019 CAL Champions)
  - Fall Play
  - Color Guard
  - Marching Band
- Winter Sports
  - Indoor Track and Field
  - Swimming and Diving (Co-Op with Newburyport)
  - Wrestling
  - Ice Hockey
  - Basketball
  - Skiing (Co-Op with Newburyport and Georgetown)
  - Winter Guard
  - Winter Percussion
- Spring Sports
  - Outdoor Track and Field
  - Lacrosse (Co-Op with Georgetown)
  - Softball (2019 CAL Champions)
  - Baseball
  - Tennis
  - Spring Musical

== Controversies ==
In October 2024, Triton Regional High School's School Resource Officer, John R. Lucey III, resigned from the Newbury, Massachusetts, Police Department following an investigation into his relationship with a recently graduated Triton student. Documents obtained through the Freedom of Information Act say this was the second known instance of Lucey — whose father was formerly the Chief of Police in Newbury — dating a former student, the first being his later ex-wife, whom he began dating a year after her graduation in 2012.

The investigation, which initiated in May 2024, found that Lucey had established a personal relationship with student before graduation and later misrepresented details of the relationship to authorities. While the inquiry determined his actions were unbecoming of an officer, no violations of state law were found. His resignation came before a Human Resources recommendation for his termination.

The incident has led to ongoing discussions between the Newbury Police Department and Triton Regional School District about the future and efficacy of the School Resource Officer program.

== See also ==
- List of high schools in Massachusetts
