= Rockport High School =

Location
- 24 Jerdens Lane; Rockport, Massachusetts 01966; United States; 42.6524°N 70.6093°W

Information
- Type: Public high school Open enrollment
- School district: Rockport Public Schools
- Superintendent: Robert Liebow
- Principal: Amy Rose
- Faculty: 28.1
- Teaching staff: 26.30 (FTE)
- Grades: 9–12
- Enrollment: 226 (2023–2024)
- Student to teacher ratio: 8.59
- Colors: Maroon and silver
- Athletics: Cape Ann League
- Team name: Vikings
- Newspaper: Viking Vibe
- Website: rhs.rpk12.org
- Rockport High School
- U.S. National Register of Historic Places
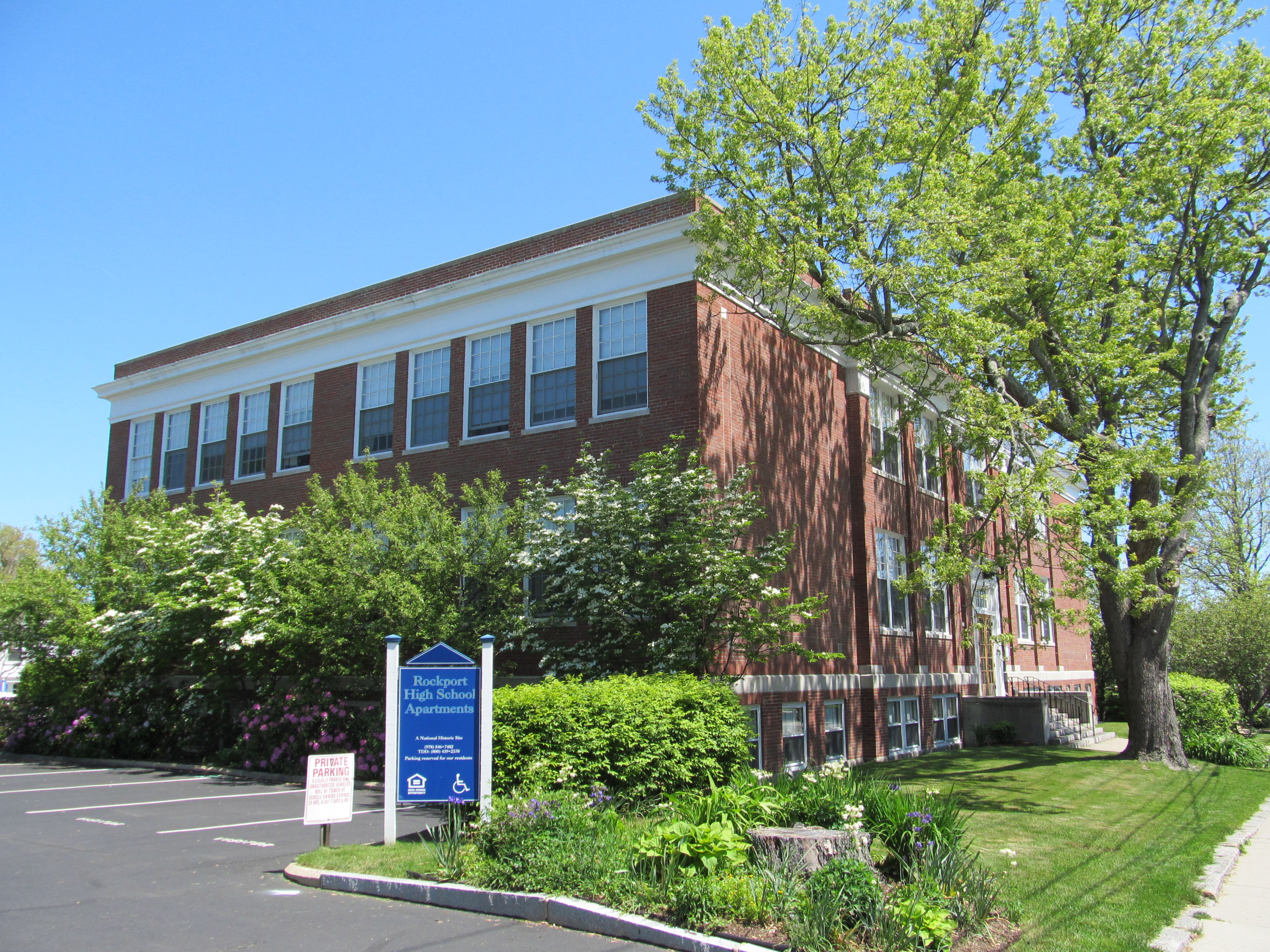
- 1925 Rockport High School

- Location within Massachusetts Location within the United States
- Location: 4 Broadway
- Coordinates: 42°39′28″N 70°37′3″W
- Architect: J. Williams Beal, Sons
- Architectural style: Colonial Revival
- NRHP reference No.: 97000498
- Added to NRHP: May 30, 1997

Rockport High School is a public high school in Rockport, Massachusetts.

== History ==
Rockport has had four different high school buildings. The Old Rockport High School was built in 1865 and now serves as the Rockport Community Center. The second building, located at 4 Broadway, was built in 1925 and served the school system in a variety of capacities until 1988. That structure was designed by the architecture firm J. Williams Beal, Sons. The high school was moved in the 1960s to the George Tarr School, a converted 1904 textile mill building, adjacent to the 1925 building. Rockport High moved into its present facility at 24 Jerdens Lane in 1988.

Both the 1865 and 1925 buildings are listed on the National Register of Historic Places.

== Athletics ==
Home of the Vikings, Rockport High School athletic teams wear the colors of maroon and silver. The school competes within the Cape Ann League in a select number of sports, including baseball, basketball, field hockey, ice hockey, soccer, and softball.

== Notable alumni ==
- Paula Cole, singer
- Geneva Smith Douglas, nuclear physicist and radiation scientist
- Andrew Stanton, producer
- Anna Zerilli, football player

== See also ==
- National Register of Historic Places listings in Essex County, Massachusetts
