= Manchester Essex Regional Middle/High School =

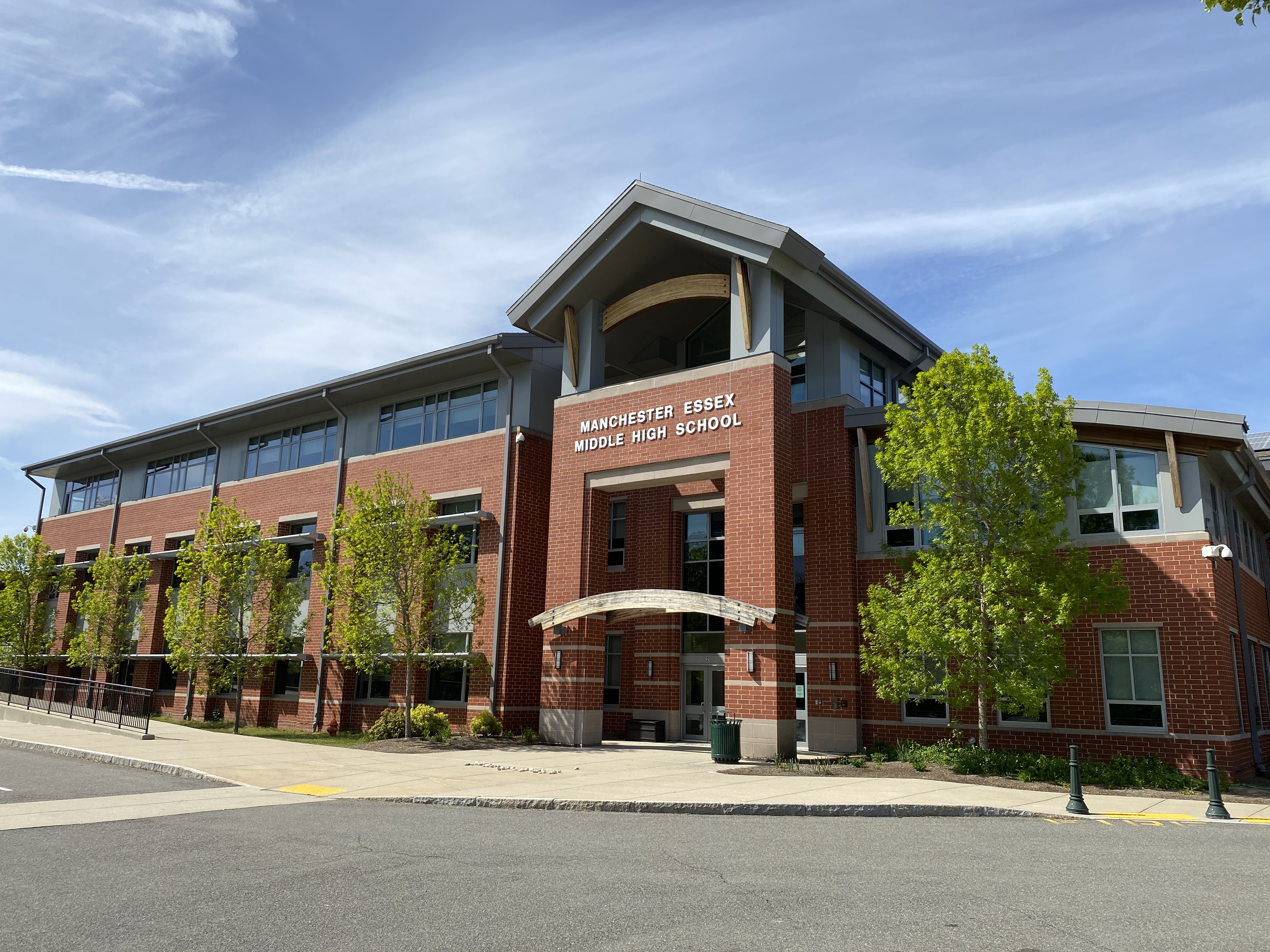

Location
- 36 Lincoln Street; Manchester-by-the-Sea, Massachusetts 01944; United States

Information
- Type: Public; Coeducational; Open enrollment
- Status: Open
- School district: Manchester Essex Regional School District
- Principal: Julie Sgroi
- Grades: 6–8, 9–12
- Enrollment: 674 (2023–2024)
  - Middle school: 274
  - High school: 400
- Colors: Green & White
- Athletics conference: Cape Ann League
- Mascot: Hornet
- Team name: Manchester Essex Hornets
- Accreditation: New England Association of Schools and Colleges
- Newspaper: The Independent
- Communities served: Manchester-by-the-Sea, Essex
- Website: www.mersd.org

Manchester Essex Regional High School is the public middle and high school for the towns of Essex and Manchester-by-the-Sea, Massachusetts, United States, with an approximate enrollment of 490 students in 6th to 12th grades and a total of 65 faculty members. The average SAT score for the Class of 2012 was 584 in math, 569 for critical reading, and 562 for writing.

== Communities ==
Manchester Essex Regional Middle High School is situated in the heart of Manchester-By-the-Sea, Massachusetts and primarily serves the communities of Manchester and Essex, which have a combined population of 8,495 people: 5,228 in Manchester and 3,267 in Essex. English is the primary language of both communities, with only a negligible percentage (0.2) of other languages spoken in some homes. The small number of non-white students in the schools accurately reflects the racial and ethnic demographics of the community. According to the 2000 U.S. census, the median family income in Manchester was $93,609; the median family income in Essex was somewhat lower at $70,152; the disparity represents a correlation with the higher property values along the ocean in Manchester. The unemployment rate in the District is annually 3.5-4% and approximately 6% of the district's students are identified as Low-income.

The school District enjoys strong financial support from the community. The per-pupil expenditures annually exceed the State average; for example, during 2006–2007, the District spent $12,436 per student vs. the State average of $11,210. During the same school year, the percentage of local property tax dollars allocated to schools was 57.4% and the total percentage of school funds obtained from local sources was 81.3%. Only approximately 2% of the District's annual budget is obtained from federal funds. Each year, approximately 10% of the District enrollment is made up of students from neighboring towns through the school choice program.

The District consists of two elementary schools – one in each town – and a single-building Middle / High School. In addition, there are two private elementary schools located in Manchester – The Brookwood School and Landmark School. Within driving distance, there are six additional private, elementary schools, and nine private secondary schools that attract District residents. The total number of school-aged children – Pre-K through grade 12 - living in the District is 1507. Of that number, a total of 34 students (2.25%) attend public out-of-District schools: 11 students (.7%) at the two vocational schools, and 23 students (1.5%) at area public schools. Largely owing to the affluence of the community and to individual family traditions, the District sees a fairly substantial number of students– 20.4% - attend private day and boarding schools. When considering high school age only, the percentage is 29.7%.

== Rankings ==
Manchester Essex has fallen in state and national rankings in recent years. In 2005, Boston Magazine ranked Manchester Essex as the 3rd best public school in the Commonwealth. As recently as 2009 the magazine ranked the school 12th in the state. However, the school fell to 22nd in 2012 and then went unranked in 2013 by U.S. News & World Report. In 2018, Manchester Essex was ranked the 5th best public school in the Commonwealth.

== History ==
=== Manchester schools before regionalization ===
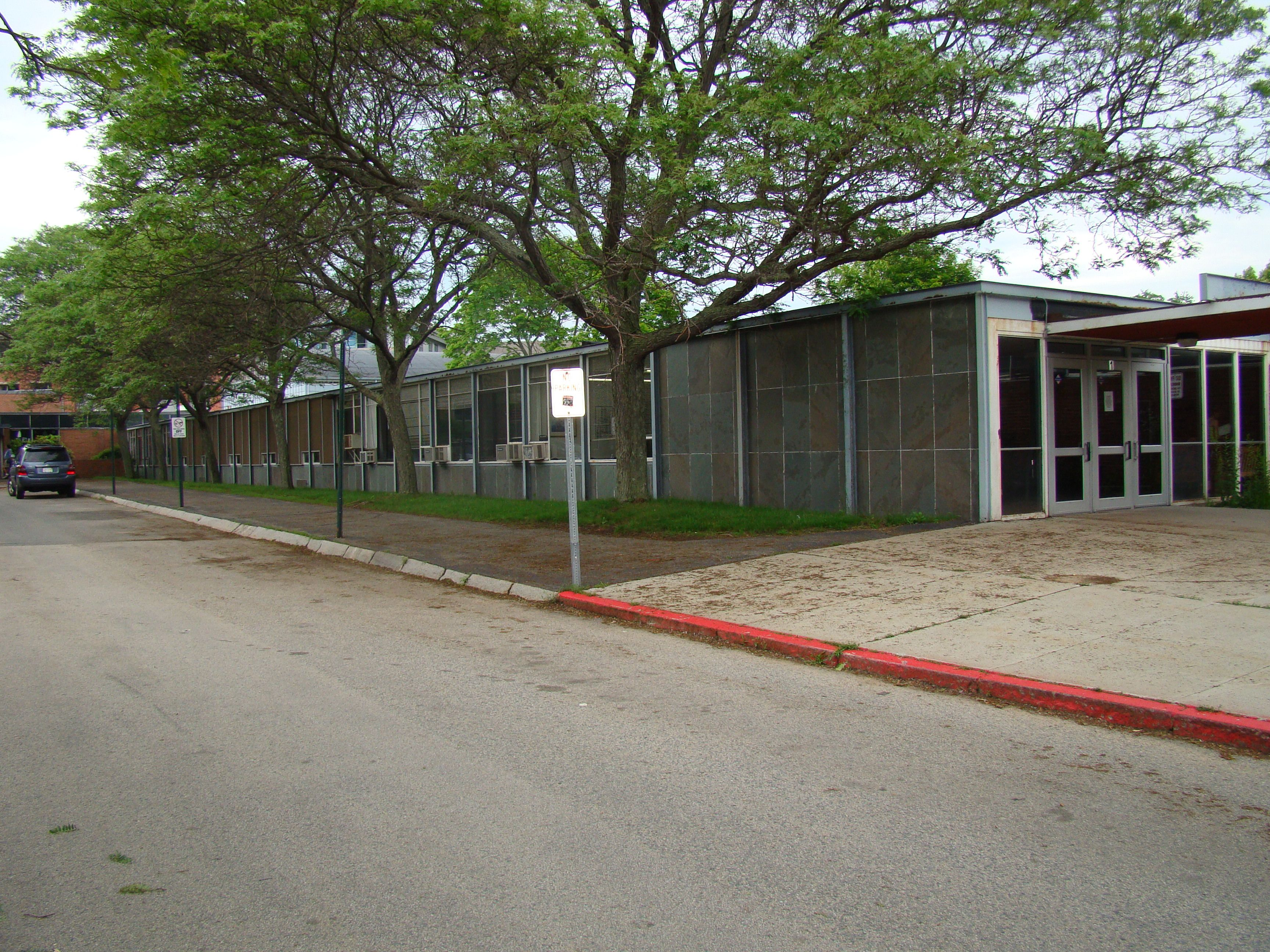
Former 1962 Manchester Junior-Senior High School

The first record of public education in Manchester dates to 1696 when three town residents were selected to choose a schoolmaster for the town. However, schooling did not become free until 1724. In 1736 the town voted to support four public schools, each in its own district. In 1785 the town voted to build the first building dedicated solely to education. However, public education remained fragmented between several small schools and districts until they were consolidated in the mid-19th century.

In 1874 the town opened a new high school in an existing building at the top of Bennett Street. The building was expanded in 1895, 1909, and 1927, making the additions larger than the original building. After the 1895 expansion, the building was named for Dr. Asa Story, a longtime member of the School Committee. In 1953 Story High School was moved from the Bennett Street building to Price Elementary School at the corner of Norwood Avenue and Brook Street. The high school retained its name and remained at that location until a new building was constructed in 1962. The Bennett Street building and the original Price School were demolished in 1953 and 1965, respectively.

=== Regionalization ===
In 2000, Essex voters approved a plan to create a regional school district with Manchester-by-the-Sea. Pursuant to Chapter 71 of the General Laws of the Commonwealth of Massachusetts, the towns of Essex and Manchester-by-the-Sea signed the Regional School District Agreement, which was subsequently amended on October 14, 2003, and May 10, 2007. The agreement established the Manchester Essex Regional School District, with a regional school committee consisting of seven members, four of whom were to be residents of Manchester and three residents of Essex, and mandates that the District maintain at least one elementary school facility in each member town.

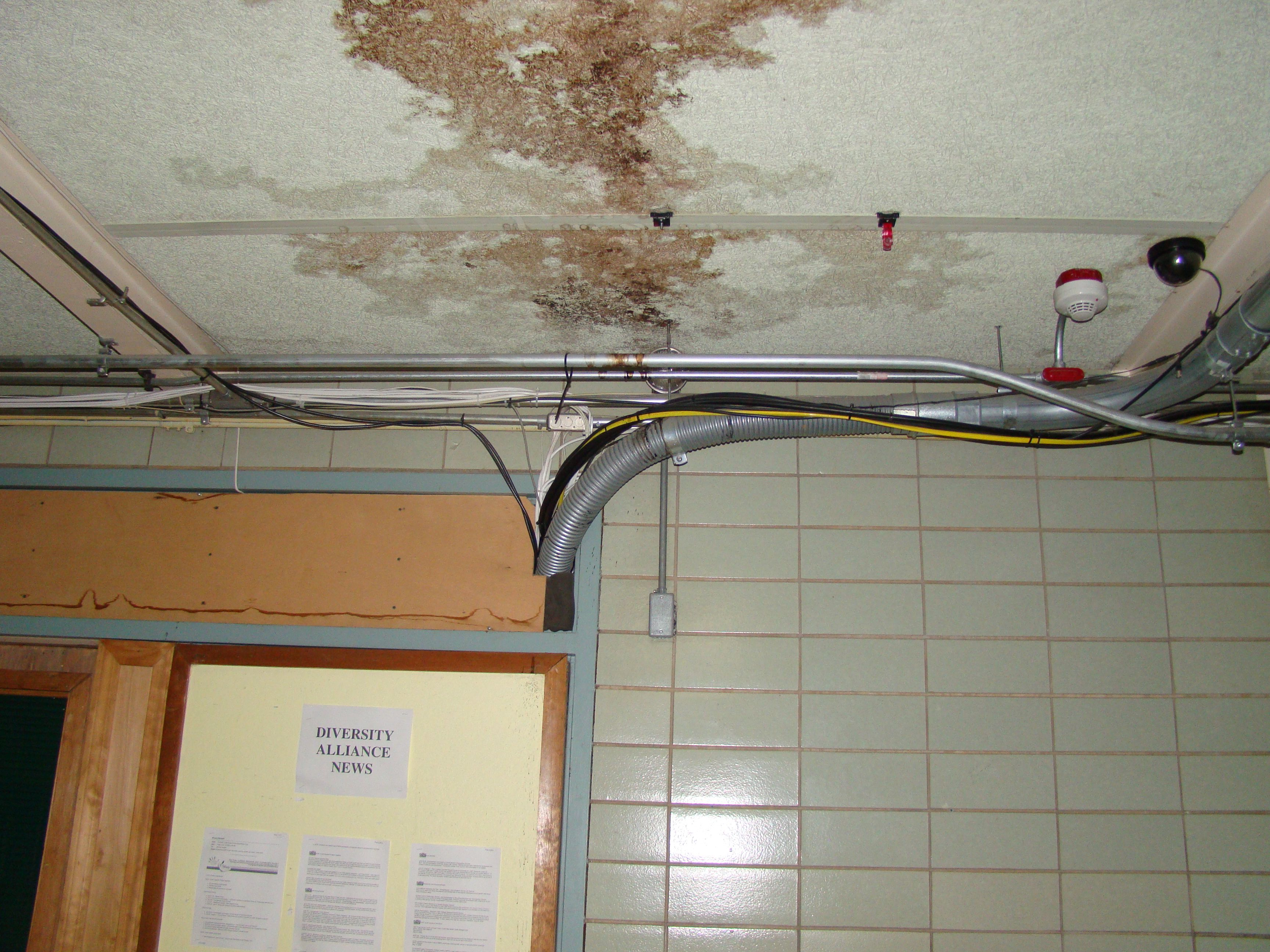
Ceiling in the old high school

As part of regionalization, both towns recognized that a new middle and high school would need to be built. In June 2003 the proposal for a $35.5 million middle and high school complex passed overwhelmingly in Manchester, but failed by 11 votes later that month in Essex. The Essex selectmen agreed to hold a new election, but it was voted down again on July 22, 2003.

In early 2006, the voters of both Essex and Manchester approved a project to build a new $49 million regional middle and high school on Hyland Field, behind the existing school. In both cases the project was approved at a Town Meeting and then again at the ballot box for a debt exclusion that permitted the towns to raise funds in excess of the 2.5% property tax cap mandated by Prop. 2.5.

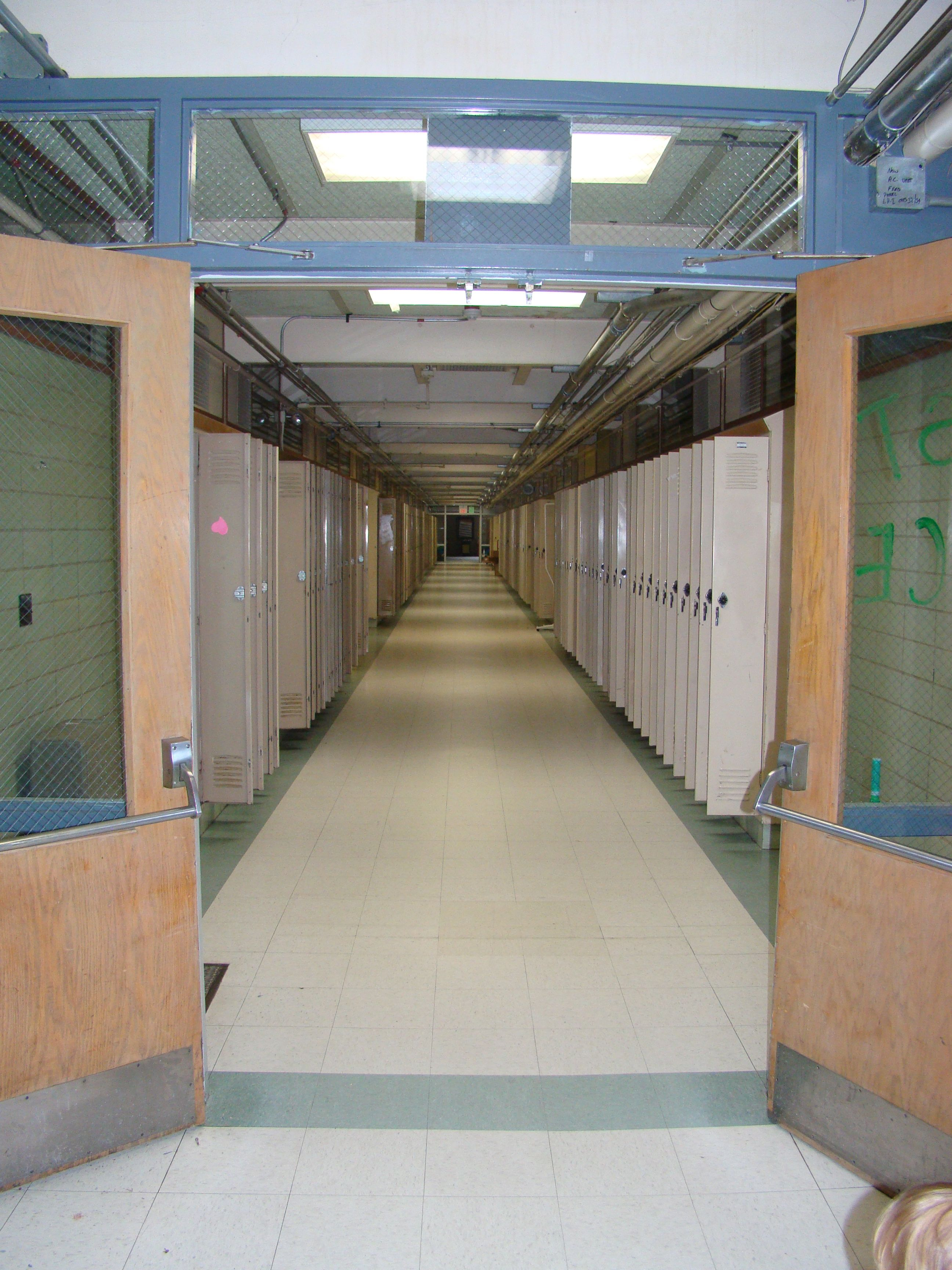
Main hallway, old high school

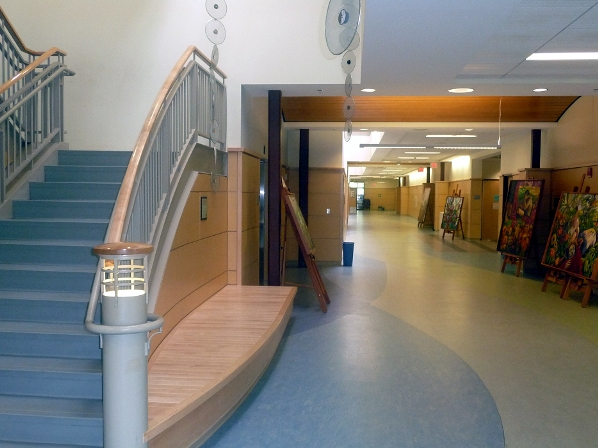
Main hallway, new high school

=== New middle/high school ===
Construction of the new school was completed in the summer of 2009, and the building was opened on September 9, 2009. It is approximately double the size of its predecessor, but has a smaller footprint since it has three stories. The building opened with about 800 students, 50 more than it was originally designed to hold. Over the following year, the old building was demolished and the athletic fields were completed.

== Principals ==
=== High school ===
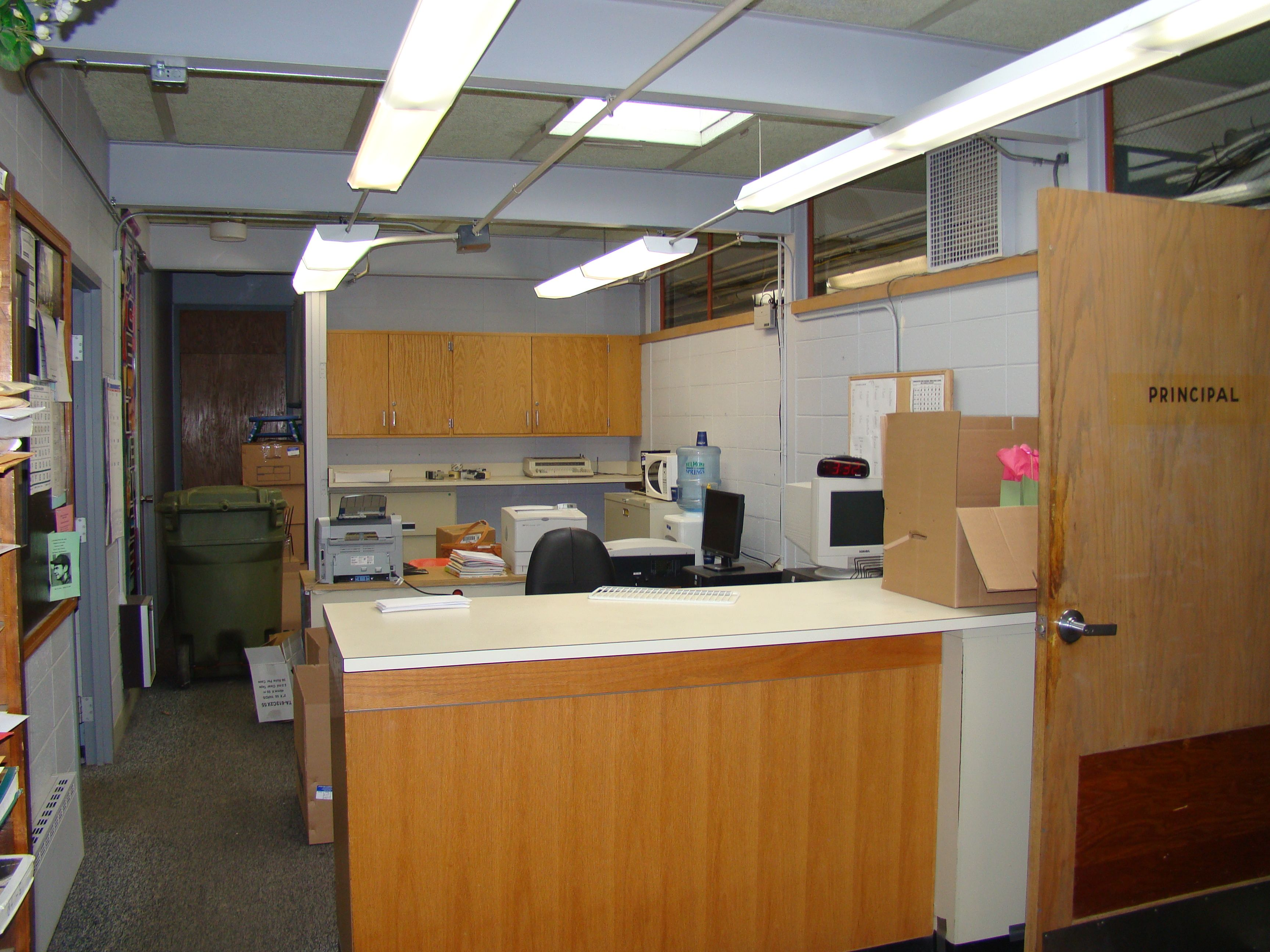
Main office, old high school

Between 1970 and 2000, the Junior-Senior High School was led by only four individuals: Richard Howland, Henry Lukas, Bill Foye, and Robert Snaps. However, in the first thirteen years of regionalization, there have been five high school principals.

At the time of regionalization, Robert Shaps was the principal of the Manchester Junior-Senior High School. When Shaps was named superintendent in 2003, he hired Peter Sack as interim principal. Before retiring, Sack had been the principal of Swampscott High School from 1983 to 2003.

After two years as interim principal, Sack was replaced by James Lee in 2006. Before coming to Manchester Essex, Lee spent three years as principal of Newburyport High School and four as the school's dean of students. After six years at Manchester Essex, Lee left to become the Headmaster of Braintree High School. Lee was praised by many for his strong managerial skills, straightforward personality, and effective decision-making ability. His accomplishments included leading the high school through both its NEASC accreditation and its transition to a new facility.

In the spring of 2012, Superintendent Beaudoin handpicked Sharon Maguire to serve as interim principal for the 2012–2013 school year. At the time of her appointment, Maguire was the school's director of guidance. Reading assistant principal Patricia Puglisi was hired to lead the high school starting in 2013.

=== Middle school ===
In the first thirteen years of regionalization, there have been six principals in charge of the middle school.

For most of its history, the high school was housed with a "junior high". As a result, principals Robert Shaps, Peter Sack, and James Lee oversaw the 7th and 8th grades during the first few years of regionalization. When 7th and 8th graders from Essex Elementary were moved to the Junior-Senior high building in Manchester, Superintendent Shaps hired social studies department chairperson Bruce Kaneb as assistant principal for those grades. In 2007 the middle school assistant principal job was upgraded to a principal position, relieving James Lee of those responsibilities. Superintendent Patricia Foley hired Elizabeth Raucci for the new position. At the time Raucci was serving as the principal of Groton-Dunstable Middle School. Raucci oversaw the integration of 6th graders to the middle school when the new facility was finished in 2009. Hoping to save $60,000, the superintendent had Raucci split her time between the middle school and Memorial Elementary School during the 2010–2011 school year. Five weeks before the start of the 2012 school year, Raucci announced that she was leaving to become the principal of the Rupert A. Nock Middle School in Newburyport. Without the necessary time to do a full search, Superintendent Beaudoin hired Cate Cullinane as a one-year interim principal. Among other administrative positions, Cullinane had been the principal of Masconomet Regional Middle School. In April 2013 Steve Guditus was given a three-year contract as the middle school principal.

== Academics ==
=== Advanced Placement classes ===
Sixteen Advanced Placement courses are available in English Language and Literature, United States History, Psychology, U.S. Government, Comparative Government, Calculus, Physics, Biology, Spanish Language and Literature, French Language and Literature, Computer Science A and AB, and Studio Art. During the 2011–2012 school year 106 students took 223 Advanced Placement exams, of which 92% were passing scores.

== Co-curricular programs and academic clubs ==
=== Science League ===
The Manchester Essex Science League Team is for students who are interested in applying their knowledge of science beyond the classroom. MERHS won 1st place in the catapult event in 2012 and the Marine Organisms event in 2022.

=== Math team ===
Math meets consist of six rounds, consisting of geometry, algebra, pre-calculus, and number theory skills. In each round, there are three math problems and each student participates in three rounds of their choice. Manchester Essex generally finishes in the middle of the pack at local interscholastic competitions. In 2007 Manchester Essex advanced to the state finals.

=== Green Scholars ===
The Green Team course architects (Directors Magers & Morrison) firmly believe that students are inherently curious, creative, and eager to solve problems collaboratively. Among other activities, the Directors guide students through a project management process that includes defining the project goals and objectives, identifying tasks, and quantifying necessary resources. To enable collaboration with school staff, the Leadership Team is currently identifying individual faculty members in the STEM disciplines who will collaborate with Green Scholars on individual projects. Some of the recent accomplishments of the program include winning the prestigious Green Ribbon Award, initiating a plastic bag ban in Manchester, and many more.

=== Journalism ===
Students attend the annual New England Scholastic Press Conference at Boston University as well as the Suffolk University Greater Boston High School Newspaper Banquet. Students submit individual work and the newspaper as a whole to various contests, including New England Scholastic Press, Suffolk University, Columbia Scholastic Press Association, and the Quill and Scroll Society. Recent awards include a Highest Achievement Ranking from New England Scholastic Press, a Silver Medal from Columbia Scholastic Press, First Place for Excellence in Editorial Writing from Suffolk University, and consecutive years of first runner-up and second runner-up in Excellence in News Writing from Suffolk University.

=== Band ===
The school has had a band for most of its modern history. The band has expanded from 30 to 80 students. Former director Joe Sokol created the middle school band and the 5th and 6th grade band. Later a 4th grade band, saxophone quartet, and jazz band were added. The band plays at many events at the school, including pep rallies, the Veterans Day ceremony, the Memorial Day parade, and many more, and was invited to play at Gillette Stadium for the high school football championship game in 2008. Each year the band travels to Quebec City to perform. The jazz band has approximately 20 members who play at many events outside school. It holds concerts every season. As of 2019, the band director is Joe Janack.

=== Robotics ===
Robots by the C, the school's robotics team, was created in 2005 and competes in the FIRST Robotics Competition each year. For six weeks, the team builds a robot that is capable of playing a game, which changes each season. The games are often inspired by a sport or based around a unifying theme. In 2009 the team won its first award at the quarter-finals of the Boston Regionals. Two years later the team took second place at the same tournament. In 2017, the team qualified for the FIRST Championship in St. Louis for the first time, and won the Tesla subdivision.

== Athletics ==
The Manchester Essex Hornets compete in the Cape Ann League for most sports. The school's traditional rival is Georgetown High School, and the two teams face off against each other every Thanksgiving Day for football. This rivalry has been going on since 1960, when Manchester High beat Georgetown High 22–8.

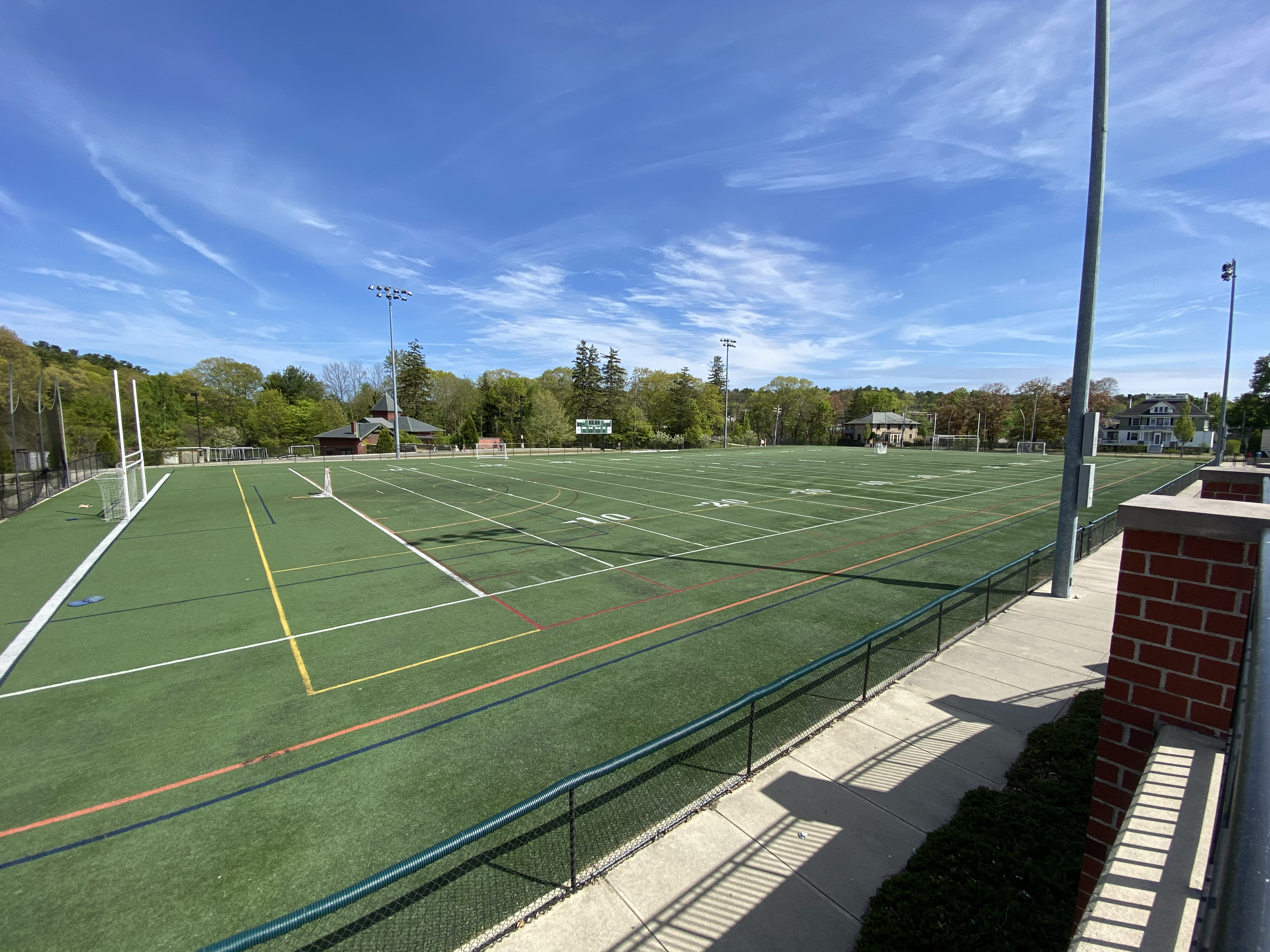
Athletic field

Hyland was followed as athletic director in 1978 by teacher Hardy Nalley, who himself was a graduate in 1962. Few could have imagined at the time that Nalley would match Hyland in his longevity and dedication to the school. As a student at the school, Nalley played on seven League-leading teams as well as winning two State titles. After retiring as a social studies teacher, Nalley stayed on as athletic director until 2009. Showing his true attachment to the school's students though, Nalley agreed to coach the 8th grade boys' basketball team during the 2010–2011 season.

=== Baseball ===
The Baseball program at Manchester-Essex, a member of the Cape Ann Small League.

In 1962 the team won the Class C Division.

In 2019, the team won their first State Championship, beating Tahanto 5–2 in the Division 4 State Championship.

=== Basketball (Boys) ===
The boys' basketball team is one of the oldest athletic teams in the history of the town, with a team dating back to the beginnings of Story High School. The most impressive period for boys' basketball was the 1940s when the team went undefeated in both the 1942 and 1943 seasons.

In 1959, Herb Schlegel best coach ever at the school, took over the head coaching job and continued his career until he won the State Small School Championship during the 1966–1967 season. That championship team defeated Rockport at the Boston Garden. Ralph Kershaw, who lost his life in the World Trade Center on September 11, was a member of the team. Richard Katherman, the first 1,000-point scorer at the school, anchored the championship team.

=== Basketball (Girls) ===
In 1926 organized athletics started for girls with the addition of field hockey and basketball at Story High School.

After many years as an activity and club sport, girls' basketball finally achieved Varsity status in 1965. The team won League championships in 1998, 2000, and 2002. The team also won the sectional title in 2000 and 2001. In 2005 teacher Lauren DuBois was hired to coach the varsity team. DuBois played basketball at Beverly High School and Bates College. The following season she led the team to the north semi-finals. The team went on to win the Division 4 North title in 2008 and 2010, advancing to the state championship game in the Boston Garden. In recognition of her efforts, DuBois was named the Massachusetts Basketball Coaches Association Division 4 North Girls' Coach of the Year in 2007 & 2010 and the Boston Globe's Division 4 Girls' Coach of the Year in 2008.

=== Field Hockey ===
In 1926 organized athletics started for girls with the addition of field hockey and basketball at Story High School.

=== Football ===
During the Second World War Manchester switched to six-man football. With Joe Hyland as the coach in the 1940s and 1950s, the school won 80% of its games and remained undefeated at home for eight years. After Hyland stepped down as football coach, Manchester football was coached by Ed Field Jr. from 1960 until 1973.

After Hyland stepped down as football coach, Manchester football was coached by Ed Field Jr. beginning in 1960. In 1961 Manchester went undefeated and went on to become State Class D Champions, in only its second year of 11-man football. The team was captained by Peter Foster and future Athletic Director Hardy Nalley. Besides Foster and Nalley, seniors Elliott Crocker, John Heath, Don Macreae, Frank Glass, Eric Ericson, Al Clapp, Pete Milner, and Bud Backry played on the team. Coach Ed Field was a staple in Manchester Football and is largely credited with building the team in preparation for future glory. Field and Hyland's accomplishments were marked by the dedication of the Lincoln Street and Brook Street athletic fields to each of them, respectively.

In 1981 Manchester led the Mayflower League and defeated Dorchester High School in the Super Bowl 49–6 to win the Class D State Title. The team was coached by Charles Cook and captained by Eddie Field, Eric Bachry, and Darren Twombley.

In 1982 Manchester High School had ten straight victories during its regular season to lead the Mayflower League. In the Super Bowl, the Hornets defeated Nantucket High School 28–6 to win the State Class D Championship. The team was coached by Fran York, who was 75–33 as Manchester's coach. The following year the team moved to the Commonwealth League, where they dominated thanks in large part to standout Mark Needham ('87). After about ten years as an independent team, the team rejoined the Commonwealth League.

During the 1999–2000 season, the Hornets were champions of the Commonwealth League and won the Super Bowl to be the Division VI State Champions. The team was coached by Dick Ananian and captained by Nick Ferraco, Dan McLaughlin, and Chris Murray.

In 2019, after consistent finishes in the bottom half of the division, the football team left the Cape Ann League and became an independent team. This led them to their best record of the decade and into the Division 7 North finals, where their season was put to an end by the Greater Lawrence Tech team.
