= Byfield, Massachusetts =

Village in Newbury, Massachusetts, US

Coordinates: 42°45′35″N 70°56′53″W

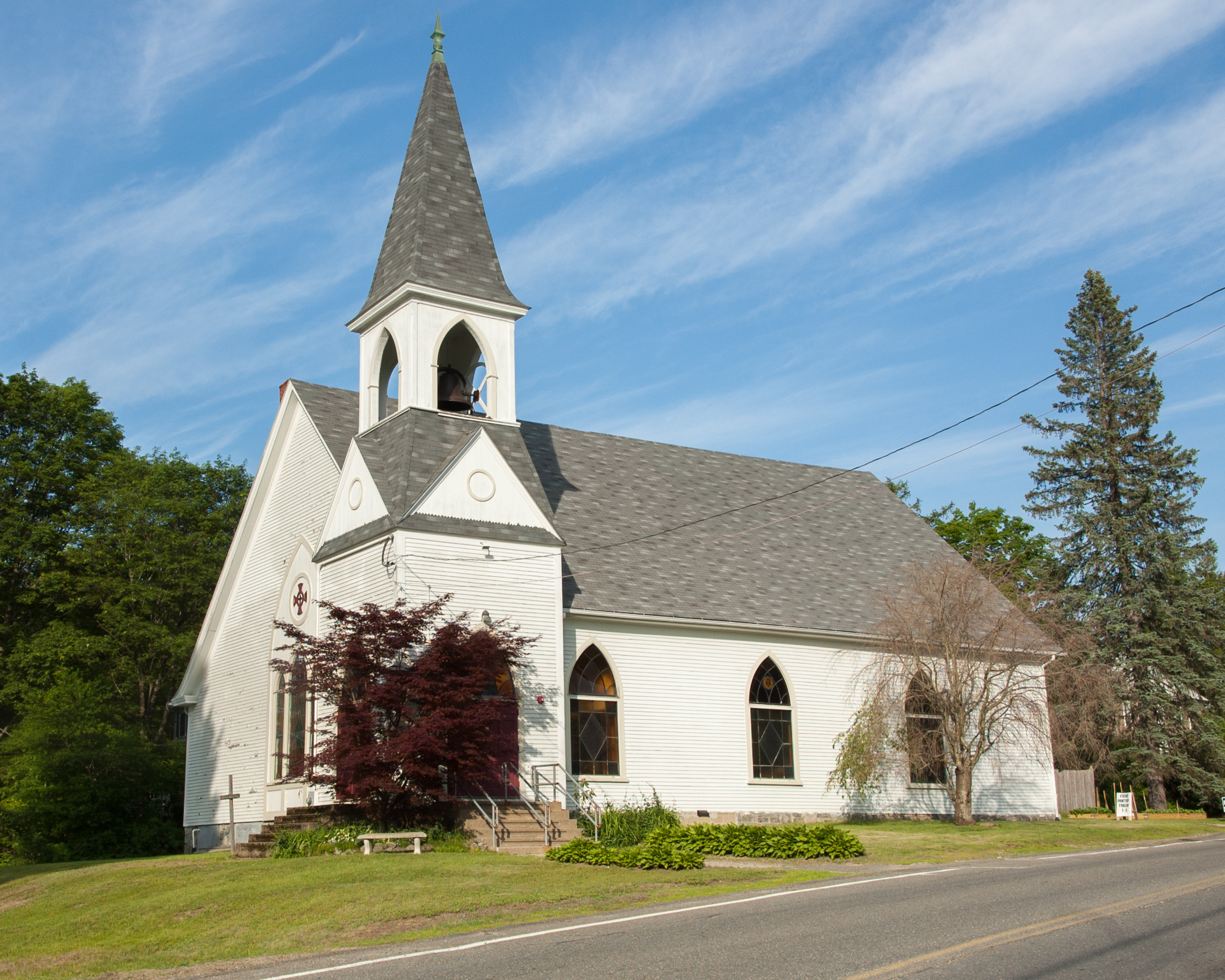
Methodist church in central Byfield

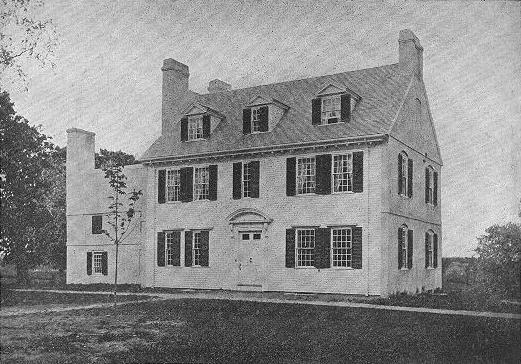
Gov. William Dummer House in 1905

Byfield is a village (also referred to as a "parish") in the town of Newbury, in Essex County, Massachusetts, United States. It borders West Newbury, Georgetown, and Rowley. It is located approximately 30 miles (48 km) north-northeast of Boston, along Interstate 95, about 10 miles (16 km) south of the border between New Hampshire and Massachusetts. The ZIP Code for Byfield is 01922.

Byfield was also the home of Governor William Dummer. The village post office was established January 11, 1826, with Benjamin Colman as the first postmaster.

The village consists of mainly residential homes, with a few local businesses. It also contains the Newbury town library and Triton Regional High School, which serves three towns (Salisbury, Rowley and Newbury), Adelynrood Retreat & Conference Center, run by the Society of the Companions of the Holy Cross as well as the prep school The Governor's Academy (previously known as Governor Dummer Academy after William Dummer, one of the founders of the Newbury area). An arts center and Pearson's deer farm are also located in Byfield.

A festival called "Byfield Days" formerly took place during the first weekend in June, which included the crowning of Miss Byfield and a woodsmen's contest.

== Etymology ==
Byfield was named after a Judge Byfield, who donated the bell to the Byfield Parish Church.

== Notable places ==
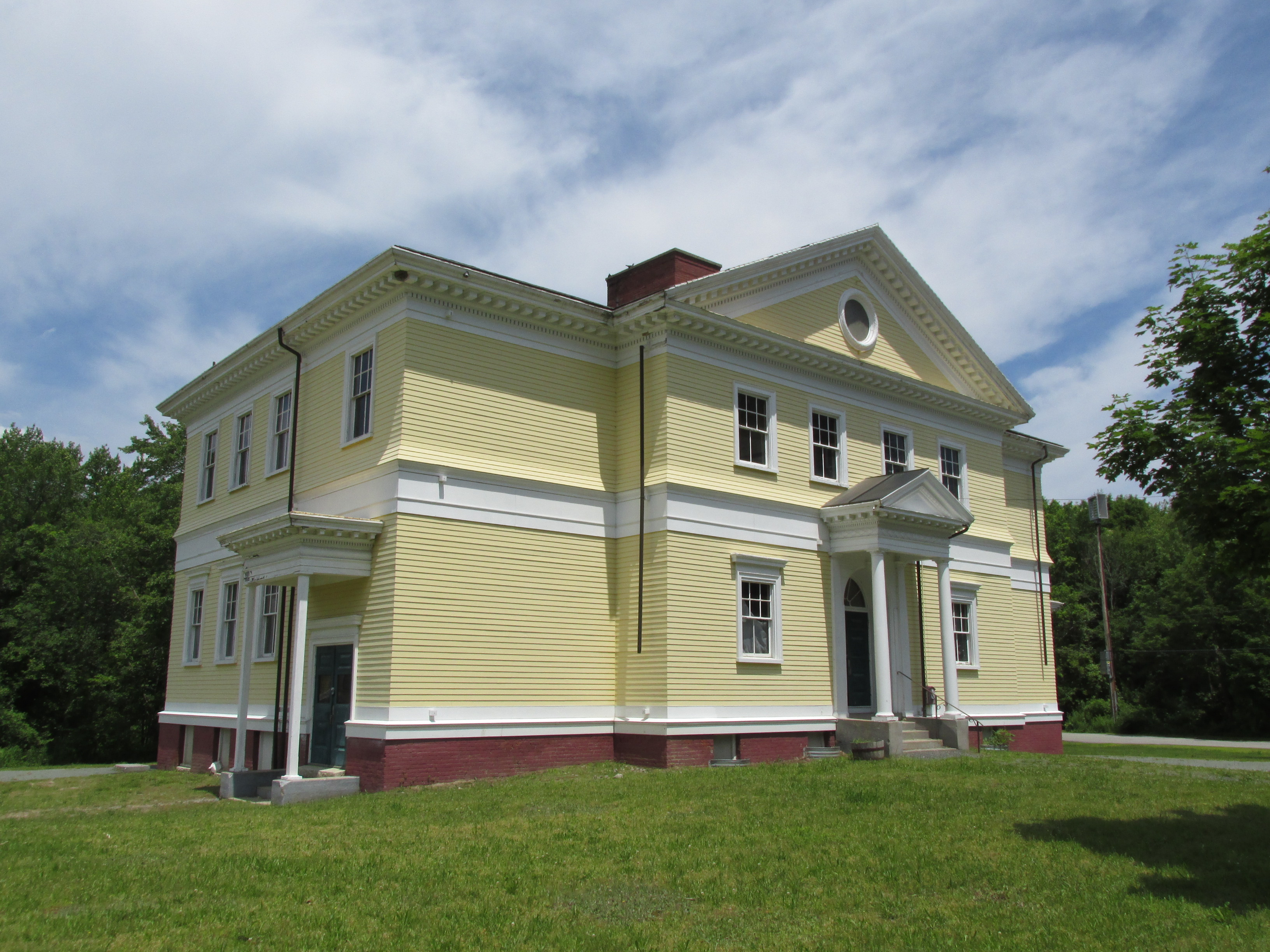
Elementary school

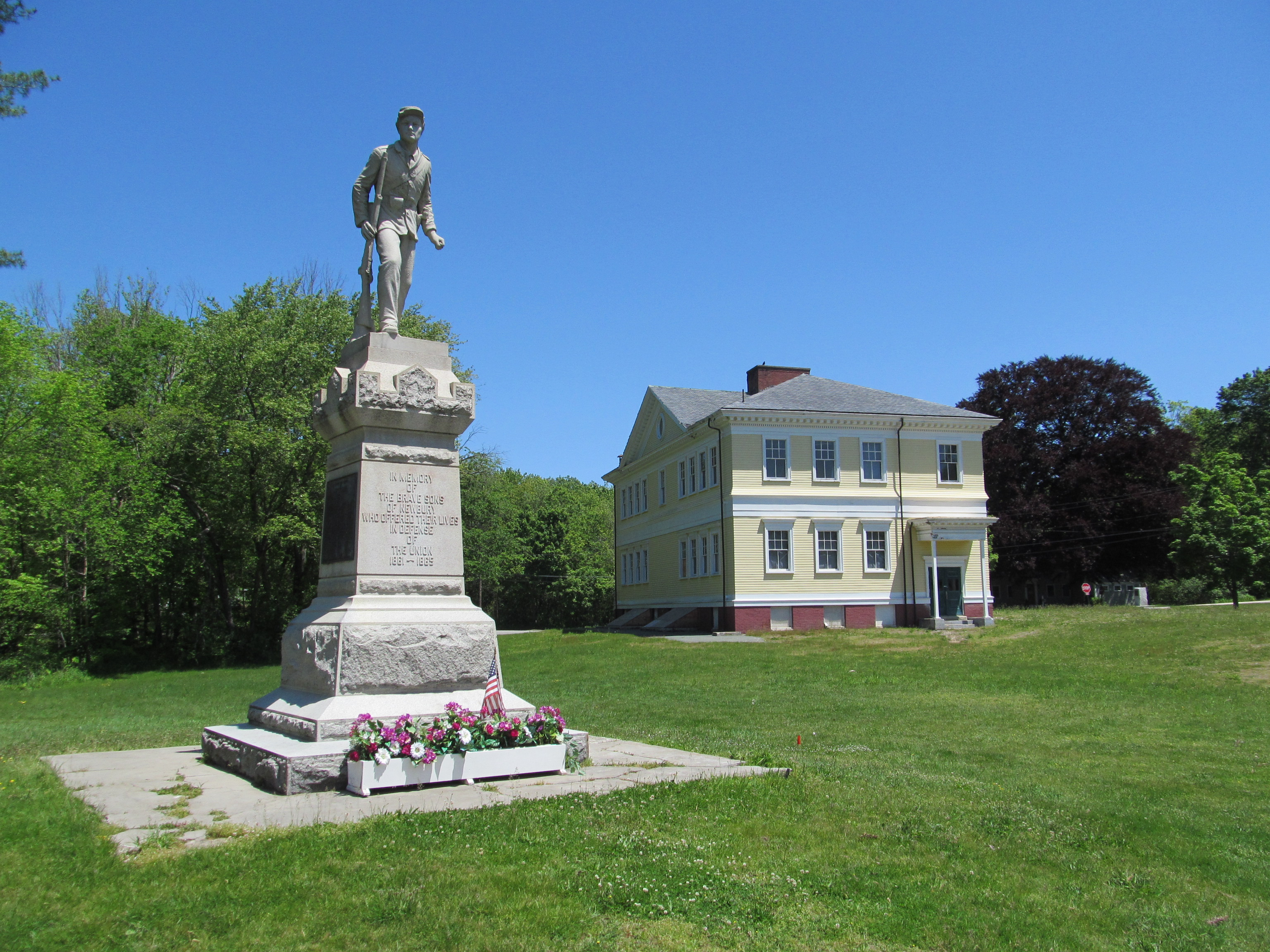
Civil War memorial statue

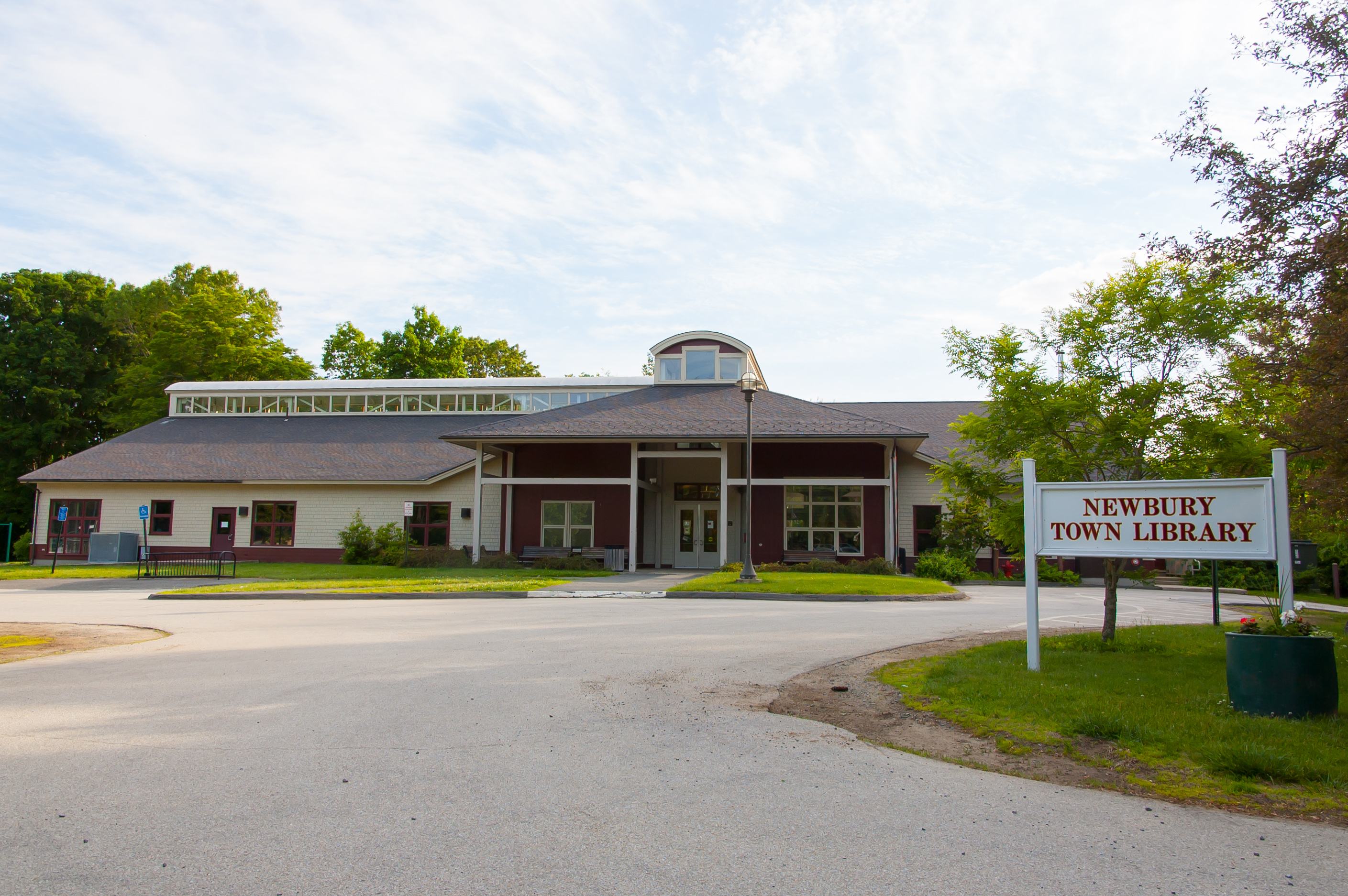
Newbury library, located in Byfield

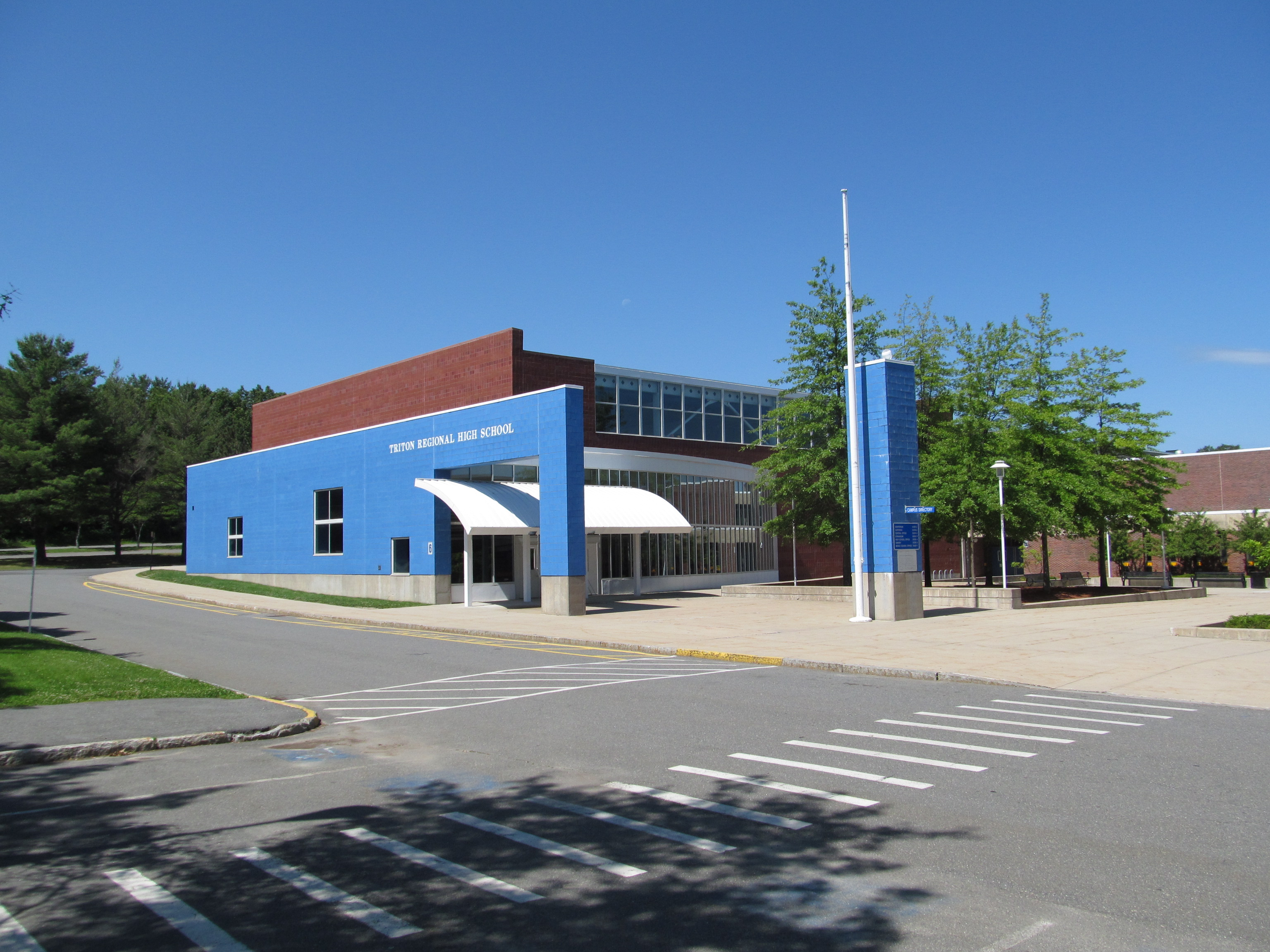
Triton Regional High School

Governor's Academy located on William Dummer's estate.

== In popular culture ==
The short story "Snowball," by mystery writer Ursula Curtiss, takes place in Byfield.
