= Pioneer Valley Interscholastic Athletic Conference =

High school athletic conference in Massachusetts, U.S.

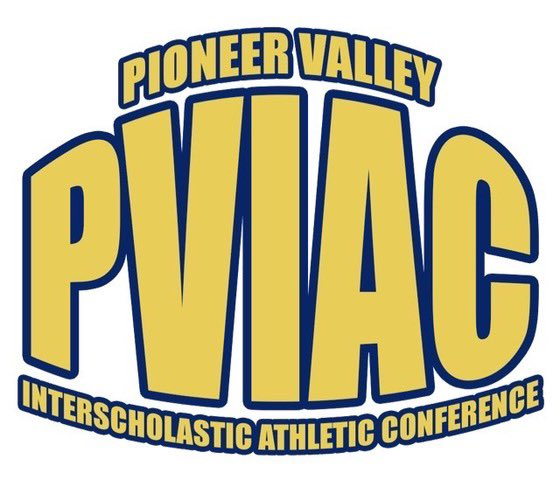
- Conference: MIAA
- Founded: 1980
- Region: Western Massachusetts

The Pioneer Valley Interscholastic Athletic Conference (PVIAC) is a high school athletic conference in District 1 of the Massachusetts Interscholastic Athletic Association (MIAA). The conference was founded in 1980, and consists of schools in the Berkshire, Franklin, Hampden, and Hampshire counties of Massachusetts. The league is made up of a mix of public, charter, vocational/technical, and Christian high schools.

In 2021, the MIAA reorganized its state tournaments and as a result, Berkshire County lost its District 1 status. District 1 and 2 were merged and all Berkshire County teams including Pittsfield High, Taconic High, Wahconah Regional, Hoosac Valley Regional, Mount Greylock Regional, Lenox Memorial, Lee Middle/High School, Monument Mountain Regional, Mount Everett and Drury High School were folded into the PVIAC. McCann Tech is in Berkshire County but had participated as a PVIAC member.

PVIAC Franklin County
PVIAC East Springfield Area
PVIAC Springfield Area
PVIAC West Springfield Area

PVIAC North Springfield Area

== Member schools ==
School	Location	Mascot	Colors	Year Founded	Enrollment	Type
Agawam High School	Agawam, Massachusetts	Brownies	Brown and Orange	1922	1,050	Public
Amherst Regional High School	Amherst, Massachusetts	Hurricanes	Maroon and White	1956	841	Public
Athol High School	Athol, Massachusetts	Bears		1856	414	Public
Baystate Academy Charter Public School	Springfield, Massachusetts	Bulls	Red	2013	414	Charter
Belchertown High School	Belchertown, Massachusetts	Orioles	Orange & Black		602	Public
Chicopee Comprehensive High School	Chicopee, Massachusetts	Colts	Blue & Gold	1962	1,212	Public
Chicopee High School	Chicopee, Massachusetts	Pacers	Maroon & Gold	1899	932	Public
East Longmeadow High School	East Longmeadow, Massachusetts	Spartans	Red & Gray	1961	771	Public
Easthampton High School	Easthampton, Massachusetts	Eagles	Red & White		373	Public
Franklin County Technical School	Montague, Massachusetts	Eagles	Blue & Black	1976	621	Vocational
Frontier Regional School	Deerfield, Massachusetts	Redhawks	Red & Blue		605	Public
Gateway Regional High School	Huntington, Massachusetts	Gators	Blue & Yellow	1963	162	Public
Granby Jr./Sr. High School	Granby, Massachusetts	Rams	Blue & White		291	Public
Greenfield High School	Greenfield, Massachusetts	Green Wave	Green & White		448	Public
Hampden Charter School of Science East	Chicopee, Massachusetts	Wolves	Red & White	2009	553	Charter
Hampden Charter School of Science West	West Springfield, Massachusetts	Lions	Blue & White	2009	394	Charter
Hampshire Regional High School	Westhampton, Massachusetts	Raiders	Red & White	1971	690	Public
High School of Commerce	Springfield, Massachusetts	Red Raiders	Red & White	1910	1,060	Public
Holyoke High School	Holyoke, Massachusetts	Knights	Purple & White	1852	1,567	Public
Hopkins Academy	Hadley, Massachusetts	Golden Hawks	Gold & White	1664	211	Public
John J. Duggan Academy	Springfield, Massachusetts	Jayhawks	Maroon and White		831	Public
Libertas Academy Charter School	Springfield, Massachusetts	Lions	Red & White	2017	519	Charter
Longmeadow High School	Longmeadow, Massachusetts	Lancers	Black & White	1956	911	Public
Ludlow High School	Ludlow, Massachusetts	Lions	Maroon and White	1910	376	Public
Ralph C. Mahar Regional High School	Orange, Massachusetts	Senators	Red & Blue	1957	504	Public
Charles H. McCann Technical School	North Adams, Massachusetts	Hornets	Green & White	1962	537	Vocational
Minnechaug Regional High School	Wilbraham, Massachusetts	Falcons	Green, White & Black	1959	981	Public
Mohawk Trail Regional High School	Buckland, Massachusetts	Warriors	Blue & Gold	1967	299	Public
Monson High School	Monson, Massachusetts	Mustangs	Blue & White	1967	295	Public
Northampton High School	Northampton, Massachusetts	Blue Devils	Blue & Gold	1899	420	Public
Palmer High School	Palmer, Massachusetts	Panthers	Blue & White	1925	509	Public
Pathfinder Regional Vocational Technical High School	Palmer, Massachusetts	Pioneers	Blue & Yellow		643	Vocational
Pioneer Valley Chinese Immersion Charter School	Hadley, Massachusetts			2007	552	Charter
Pioneer Valley Christian Academy	Springfield, Massachusetts	Eagles	Blue & White	1972	288	Private
Pioneer Valley Regional School	Northfield, Massachusetts	Panthers	Black & Gold	1969	241	Public
Pope Francis Preparatory School	Springfield, Massachusetts	Cardinals	Red & White	1883/2015*	428	Private
Roger L Putnam Vocational-Technical High School	Springfield, Massachusetts	Beavers	Blue & Gold	1940	1,383	Vocational
Springfield Renaissance School	Springfield, Massachusetts	Phoenix		2006	609	Public
Saint Mary High School	Westfield, Massachusetts	Saints	Green & Gold	1899	625	Private
Smith Academy	Hatfield, Massachusetts	Falcons	Purple & White	1872	126	Public
Smith Vocational and Agricultural High School	Northampton, Massachusetts	Vikings	Black & Gold	1908	569	Vocational
South Hadley High School	South Hadley, Massachusetts	Tigers	Black & Orange	1870	508	Public
Southwick Regional School	Southwick, Massachusetts	Rams	Green & Gold	1971	614	Public
Springfield Central High School	Springfield, Massachusetts	Golden Eagles	Black & Gold	1986	2,042	Public
Springfield High School of Science and Technology	Springfield, Massachusetts	Cybercats	Blue, White, & Gray	1996	72	Public
Springfield International Charter School	Springfield, Massachusetts	Bulldogs	Maroon & Black	1995	1,478	Charter
Turners Falls High School	Montague, Massachusetts	Thunder	Blue & White		202	Public
Veritas Prep Charter School	Springfield, Massachusetts	Vipers		2012	795	Charter
Ware Junior Senior High School	Ware, Massachusetts	Indians	Green & White	1893	471	Public
West Springfield High School	West Springfield, Massachusetts	Terriers	Blue & White	1820	2,748	Public
Westfield High School	Westfield, Massachusetts	Bombers	Red & Black	1855	1,006	Public
Westfield Technical Academy	Westfield, Massachusetts	Tigers	Purple & Gold	1911	548	Vocational

*Note: Pope Francis Prep was established under the name Cathedral High School in 1883; in 2015 it merged with Holyoke Catholic High School and became Pope Francis Prep

== Sports ==
Teams in PVIA Conference competition
Sport	Men's	Women's
Baseball	-	-
Basketball	-	-
Cross country	-	-
Field hockey	-	-
Football	-	-
Golf	-	-
Gymnastics	-	-
Ice Hockey	-	-
Lacrosse	-	-
Soccer	-	-
Softball	-	-
Swimming & Diving	-	
High school tennis|Tennis	-	-
Indoor Track & Field	-	-
Outdoor Track & Field	-	-
Volleyball	-	-
Wrestling	-	-

=== Football ===
Western Mass High School Football Champions are listed below:

Prior to the 2013 MIAA football realignment, Western Mass teams played each other for State rights. After the 2013 alignment Western Mass teams faced Central Mass teams to determine State Champion.

Year	Division	Champion
2011	1; 2; 3; 4	Longmeadow High School; Roger L Putnam Vocational-Technical High School; Mount Greylock Regional School; Pioneer Valley Regional School
2012	1; 2; 3; 4	Springfield Central High School; Wahconah Regional High School; Mount Greylock Regional School; Pathfinder Regional Vocational Technical High School
