= John W. Beal =

American architect (1887–1971)

Massachusetts Commissioner of Public Works
- In office 1939–1941
- Preceded by: William F. Callahan
- Succeeded by: Herman A. MacDonald

Personal details
- Born: July 12, 1887 Hanover, Massachusetts, US
- Died: December 3, 1971 (aged 84) Weymouth, Massachusetts, US
- Party: Republican
- Occupation: Architect

John Woodbridge Beal (July 12, 1887 – December 3, 1971) was an American architect who was a partner of J. Williams Beal, Sons.

== Early life ==
Beal was born on July 12, 1887, in Hanover, Massachusetts to J. Williams Beal and Mary Woodbridge (Howes) Beal. He graduated from Hanover High School, where he played on the football and baseball teams. He attended Thayer Academy, but dropped out due to appendicitis and decided not to attend college. Instead, he joined the office of his father.

== Architecture ==
In 1912, J. Williams Beal took ill and John Beal took a more active role in the company. The elder Beal died in 1919. John Beal and his brother founded J. Williams Beal, Sons. He specialized in construction while his brother Horatio did the design work (a third brother, Robert, was a landscape architect associated with the firm, but not as a partner).

Buildings designed by J. Williams Beal, Sons included the Granite Trust Company building, Bethany Congregational Church, Plymouth County Hospital, Repertory Theatre of Boston (now the Boston University Theatre), the Plymouth County Courthouse in Brockton, the Hyannis Town Office, Peoples National Bank of Marlboro, and a number of school buildings.

== Public life ==
=== Town of Hanover ===
Beal co-founded the No. 2 fire company of Hanover. After a few years the company was turned over to the town. During World War I he served as the town's food administrator. He later worked on an effort to bring public water to the town and served as a member of the Hanover water commission.

=== Massachusetts Republican Party ===
Beal got involved with the Massachusetts Republican Party through his friendships with Leverett Saltonstall and John Richardson. In 1936, Beal was a delegate to the Republican National Convention. That same year he also ran for a seat in the Massachusetts Senate and served as president of the Plymouth County Republican Club. In 1938 he worked for Saltonstall's gubernatorial campaign.

=== Commissioner of Public Works ===
In 1939, Governor Saltonstall removed Commissioner of Public Works William F. Callahan from office and offered Beal the job. According to Beal, he turned down the job because he did not want to give up his business, however Saltonstall submitted his name to the Massachusetts Governor's Council anyway and accepted the job. Beal's term expired on November 30, 1940 and he announced that he would not accept reappointment.

== Bribery conviction ==
On March 5, 1942, John W. and Horatio Beal were indicted on charges of conspiring to give bribes to Cambridge, Massachusetts Mayor John W. Lyons, who in 1938 awarded J. Williams Beal, Sons a contract to design the Cambridge Tuberculosis Hospital. John W. Beal was also charged with 12 counts of giving the bribes to Lyons, as well as two counts of perjury (one for lying to a grand jury investigating the city of Cambridge's building program and one for lying during the trial of Lyons and his codefendant Paul Mannos). Anthony Spinelli, the contractor for the hospital project, was also indicted.

On May 26, 1942, the Beals and Spinelli were found guilty conspiracy to commit bribery and John W. Beal was found guilty of 10 counts of bribery. John W. Beal was sentenced to a year in jail. He was paroled on January 5, 1944.

== Later life and death ==
After Horatio's death in 1964, Beal managed J. Williams Beal, Sons with H. Story Granger and Edward A. J. Poskus. He was active in the firm until his death on December 3, 1971.
