= Elks Building (Quincy, Massachusetts) =

- U.S. National Register of Historic Places
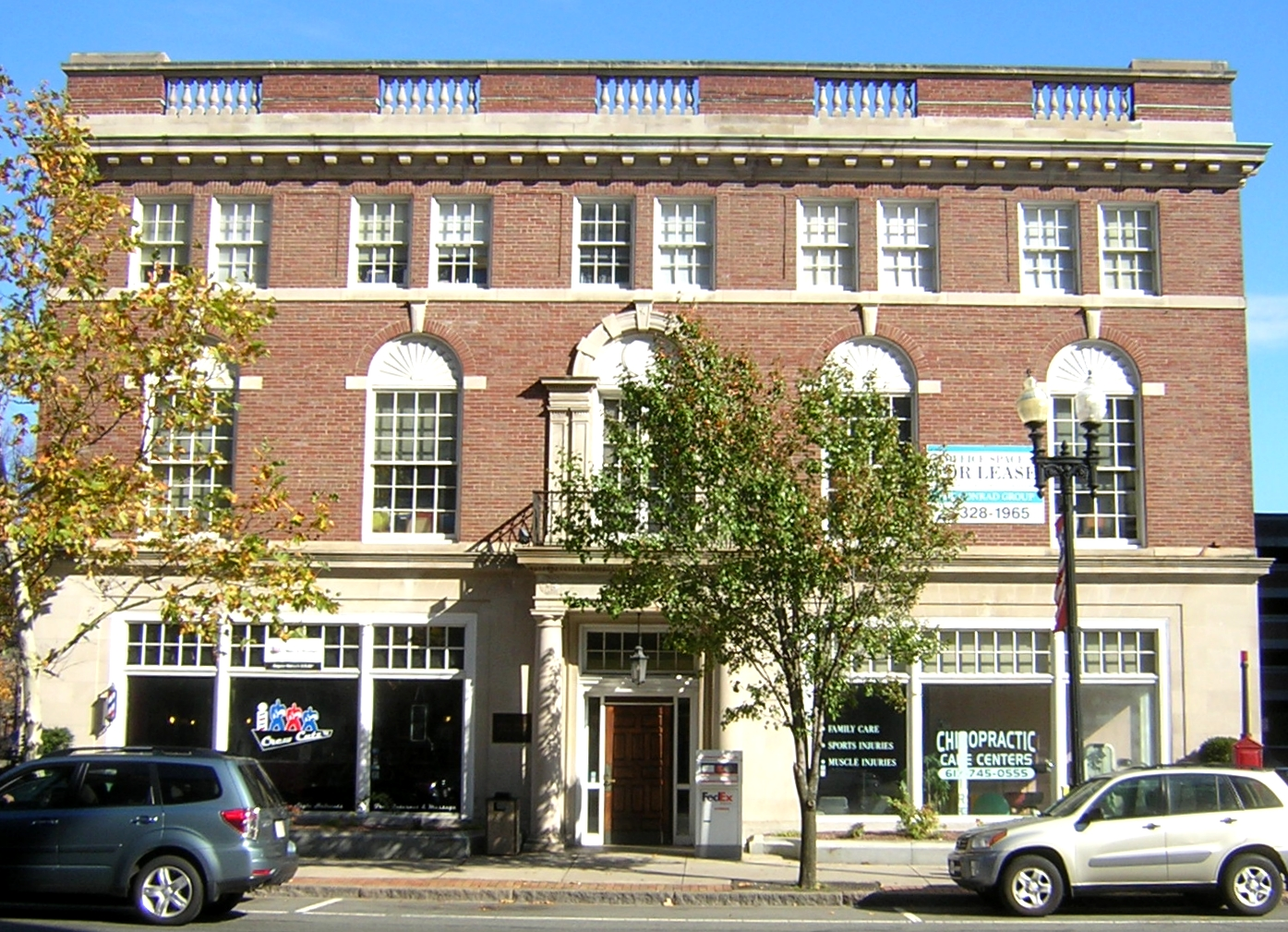

- Location within Massachusetts Location within the United States
- Location: 1218-1222 Hancock St., Quincy, Massachusetts
- Coordinates: 42°15′9.5″N 71°0′15″W
- Area: 0.3 acres (0.12 ha)
- Built: 1924
- Architect: J. Williams Beal, Sons
- Architectural style: Colonial Revival
- MPS: Quincy MRA
- NRHP reference No.: 89001348
- Added to NRHP: September 20, 1989

The Elks Building is a historic building at 1218-1222 Hancock Street in Quincy, Massachusetts. The Colonial Revival building was designed by J. Williams Beal, Sons, and built in 1924. It is one of the city's more elaborate privately owned Colonial Revival buildings. The building was listed on the National Register of Historic Places in 1989.

== Description and history ==
The Elks Building is set on the east side of Hancock Street, the main thoroughfare through downtown Quincy. It is a three-story brick structure, with limestone trim. The ground-floor retail spaces are faced in limestone, flanking a recessed entrance framed by Doric columns and topped by a wrought iron railing. The second floor has four round-arch windows, with limestone sills and keystones, flanking a central Palladian window flanked by paired pilasters. The third floor, separated from the second by a limestone stringcourse, has ten small windows grouped in pairs. Above that, a modillioned cornice is topped by a wooden balustrade.

The local Elks chapter was established by local businessmen in 1905, and first met in a variety of other meeting halls. Its first dedicated space, located on Foster Street, was built in 1907. As part of an urban redevelopment in the 1910s, the city demolished a number of wood-frame commercial and residential buildings along Hancock Street, and the Elks had this building put up in that area in 1924. It was designed by J. Williams Beal, Sons, a local architectural firm that designed several other prominent buildings in the city, including the Granite Trust Company and the Bethany Congregational Church. The building underwent a major rehabilitation in the 1980s, in which its storefronts were restored to their original appearance.

== See also ==
- National Register of Historic Places listings in Quincy, Massachusetts
