= Athol High School =

High school in Athol, Massachusetts

Coordinates: 42.5828°N 72.2045°W

Athol-Royalston Regional High School is a public high school in Athol, Massachusetts, United States. The Bears are the school mascot and the school colors are red and white. The Old Athol High School is listed on the National Register of Historic Places. The current high school is at 2363 Main Street. It is part of the Athol-Royalston Regional School District.

The school serves grades 9–12. In 2016, it reported 358 students and a 75–79 percent graduation rate. The school registered 8 percent minority enrollment. It scored above average in state tests.

== History ==
The first high school in Athol was built in 1856 at the "Old Athol High School site" at 494 School Street. In the 1890s, construction of a new high school began and additions and expansions continued with a new main building constructed in 1937 in an art deco style. It was converted to a junior high school in 1957, closed in 2003, and is now a senior living center.

== Athletics ==
Athol High School competes in the Pioneer Valley Interscholastic Athletic Conference. It maintains a rivalry with Ralph C. Mahar Regional High School.

- Shawn Patterson (composer)
