= William F. Callahan =

American politician

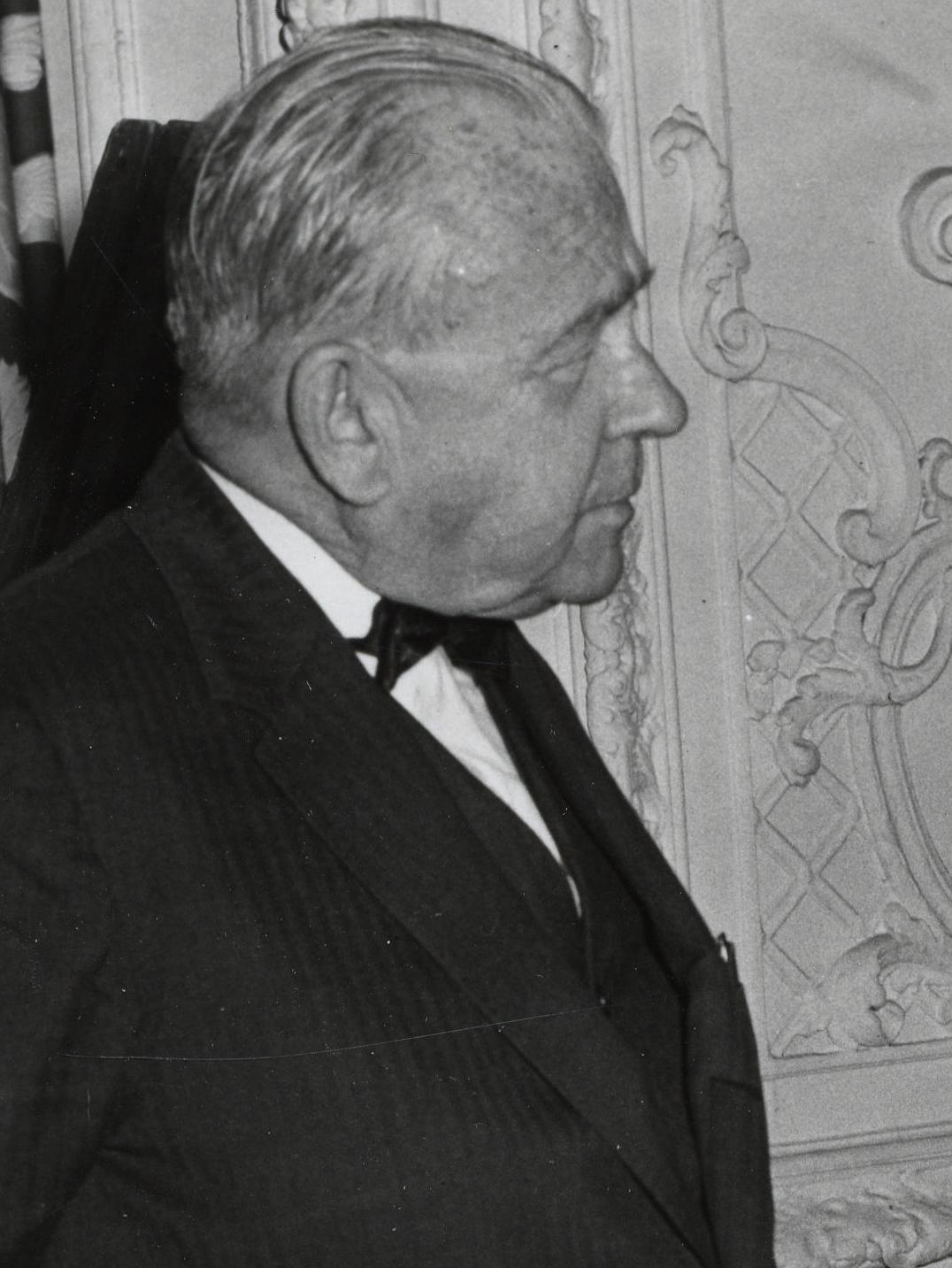
- Callahan in the 1960s

Commissioner of Public Works
- In office 1934–1939
- Preceded by: Frank E. Lyman
- Succeeded by: John W. Beal
- In office 1949–1953
- Preceded by: William H. Buracker
- Succeeded by: John A. Volpe

Chairman of the Massachusetts Turnpike Authority
- In office 1952 – April 20, 1964
- Preceded by: First
- Succeeded by: John T. Driscoll

William Francis Callahan (June 12, 1891 – April 20, 1964) was a Massachusetts civil servant who served as Commissioner of Public Works and Chairman of the Massachusetts Turnpike Authority from 1952 until his death in 1964. Callahan proposed the idea of an authority originally named Boston-Springfield Highway Authority which was renamed to the Massachusetts Turnpike Authority.

Callahan developed the Master Highway Plan for Metropolitan Boston, which included the Southwest Corridor project. The Callahan Tunnel is named after his son who was killed in action during the Second World War. Callahan died at Newton-Wellesley Hospital on April 20, 1964 as a result of suffering a heart attack in his home..
