= Kevin Fret =

Puerto Rican Latin trap musician (1993–2019)

Background information
- Born: June 11, 1993; Puerto Rico
- Died: January 10, 2019 (aged 25) San Juan, Puerto Rico
- Genre: Latin trap
- Occupations: Rapper; singer
- Instruments: Vocals

Kevin Fret Rodríguez (June 11, 1993 – January 10, 2019) was a Puerto Rican rapper, singer and the first openly gay male Latin trap artist. He was known for his gender-variant looks.

== Career ==
Between 2016 and 2018, Fret participated in singing competitions including La Banda and Solo Tu Voz. He used social media to advocate against bullying and used his voice as a member of the LGBT community to encourage other new artists beginning their careers. Fret released his breakthrough single, "Soy Asi" ("I'm Like This") on April 7, 2018, and was featured on Mike Duran's song "Diferente" ("Different"), released on July 18, 2018. Kevin Fret was managed by Alfonso J. Alvarez around the stretch of "Soy Asi".

== Artistry ==
Writer Samy Nemir Olivares described Fret as being known for "breaking gender norms [...] and stigma about being gay, gender nonconforming, and expressing gender identity freely – in a country where gay people still get mocked, bullied and killed".

== Personal life ==
Fret came out as gay at the age of 18. He was a graduate of the Roger L Putnam Vocational-Technical High School in Springfield, MA and had grown up in the city and in nearby Chicopee. Paper magazine described a "strict religious upbringing" as the reason he courted controversy in the LGBT community by saying that homosexuality was "a choice" for him. His parents were not supportive at first but were later accepting. He has a younger sister. Fret was public about undergoing liposuction surgery and buttock augmentation. While living in Miami in 2018, Fret was charged with aggravated battery after an alleged fight with another man, who Fret said had verbally attacked him because of his sexuality. He allegedly extorted another trap singer, Ozuna, for $50,000 over an edited sex tape made when Ozuna was a minor. Fret apologized to his family and friends over the extortion.

== Death ==
On January 10, 2019, Fret was riding his motorcycle in Santurce, San Juan at about 5:30 am when an unidentified gunman shot at him eight times, hitting him in the head and hip. The incident was initially regarded by authorities as an automobile accident due to the darkness of the hour. Fret was taken to the Río Piedras Medical Center, where he was pronounced dead. According to police, Fret's murder was the 22nd homicide of 2019 in Puerto Rico. His murder remains unsolved.

In 2022, Betzaida Quiñones Rodríguez, a prosecutor working on the case alleged she had been "instructed to stop" the investigation into Fret's murder.

== Discography ==
Singles

- Soy Asi (2018)
- Me Compre Un Full Kevin Fret Remix (2018)

As Featured Artist

- Mike Duran featuring Kevin Fret: Diferente (2018)

== See also ==
- Crime in Puerto Rico
- History of violence against LGBT people in the United States
- List of murdered hip hop musicians
- List of unsolved murders (2000–present)
- Significant acts of violence against LGBT people
- List of Puerto Ricans
