= J. Williams Beal, Sons =

American architectural firm

Practice information
- Founders: John W. Beal; Horatio Williams Beal
- Founded: January 1, 1920
- Dissolved: 1980s
- Location: Boston, Massachusetts

Significant works and honors
- Buildings: Repertory Theatre of Boston; Granite Trust Company Building; 13 Massachusetts high schools

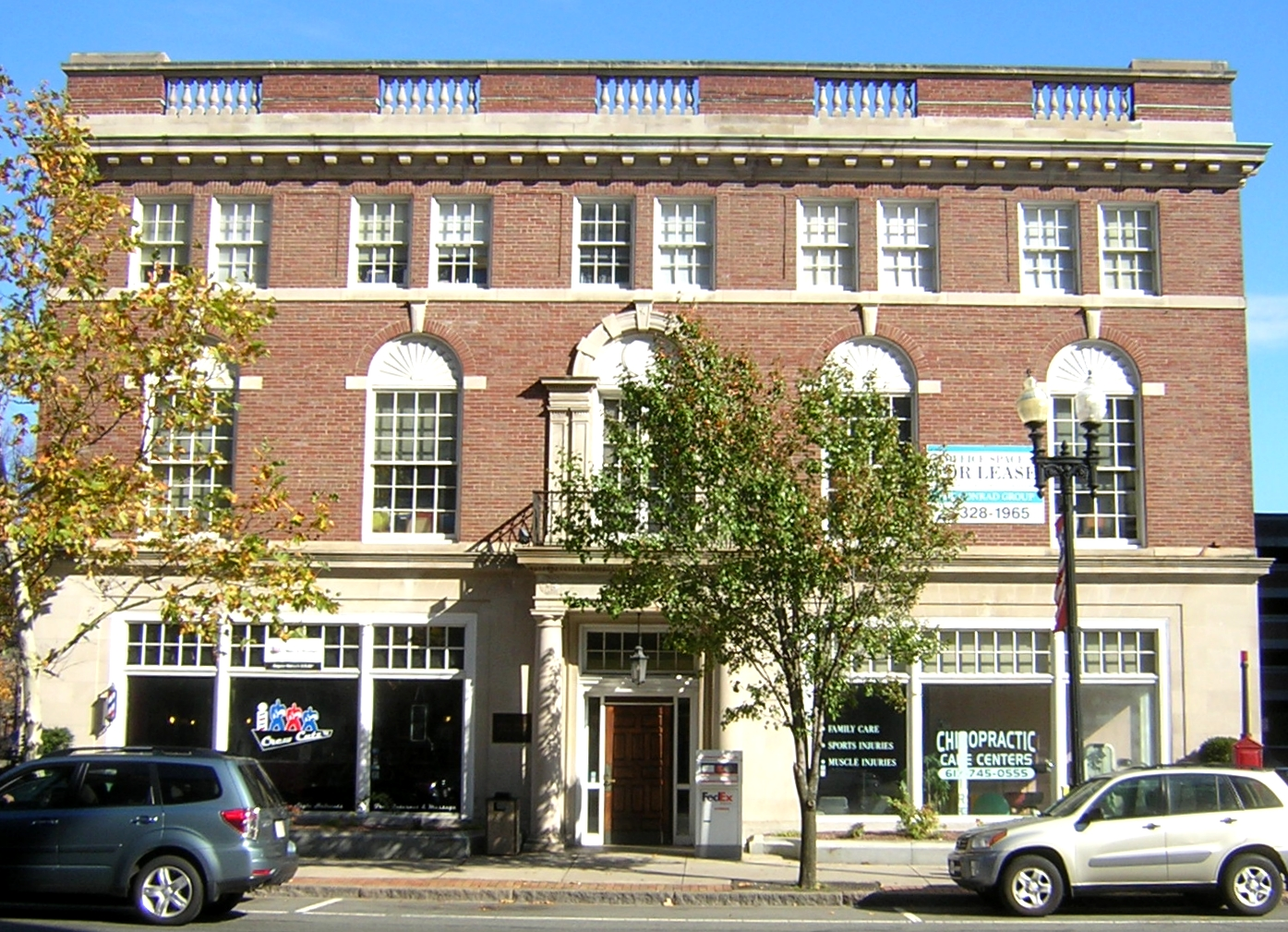
The Elks Building in Quincy, designed by J. Williams Beal, Sons and completed in 1924.

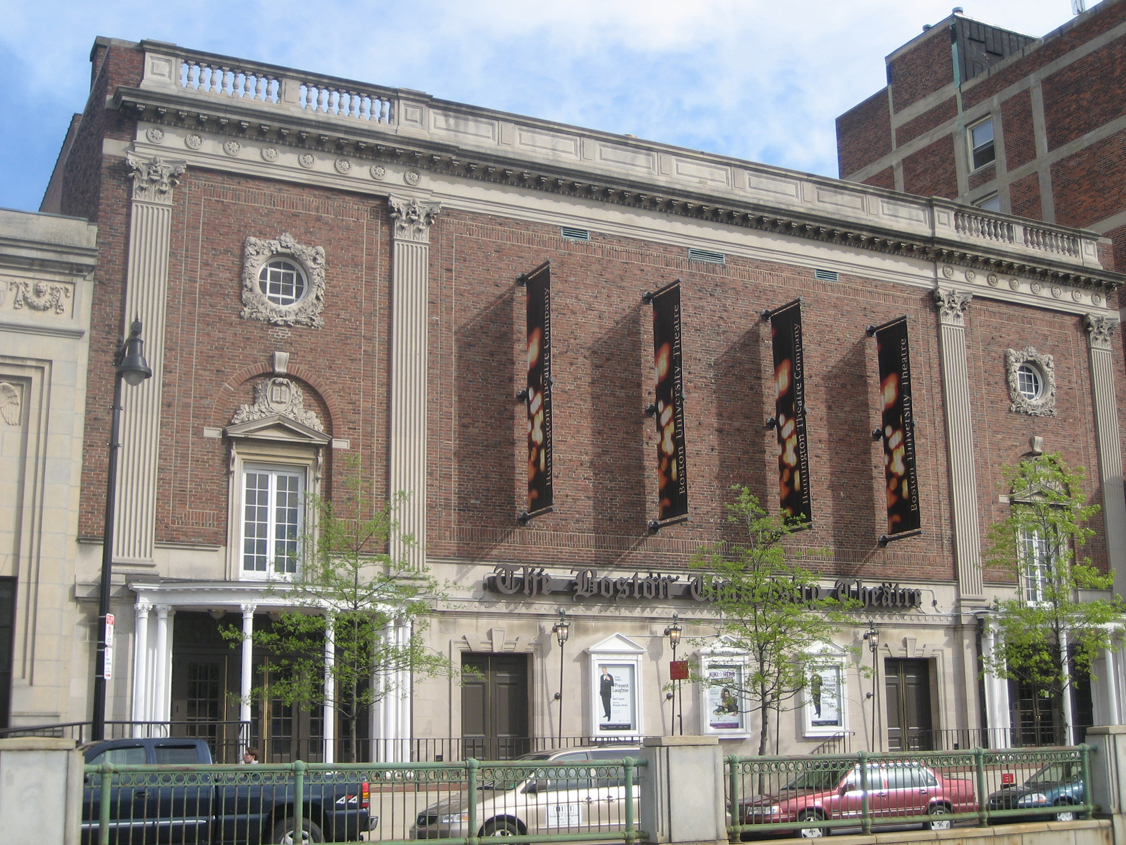
The former Repertory Theatre of Boston, now the Huntington Theatre Company, designed by J. Williams Beal, Sons and completed in 1925.

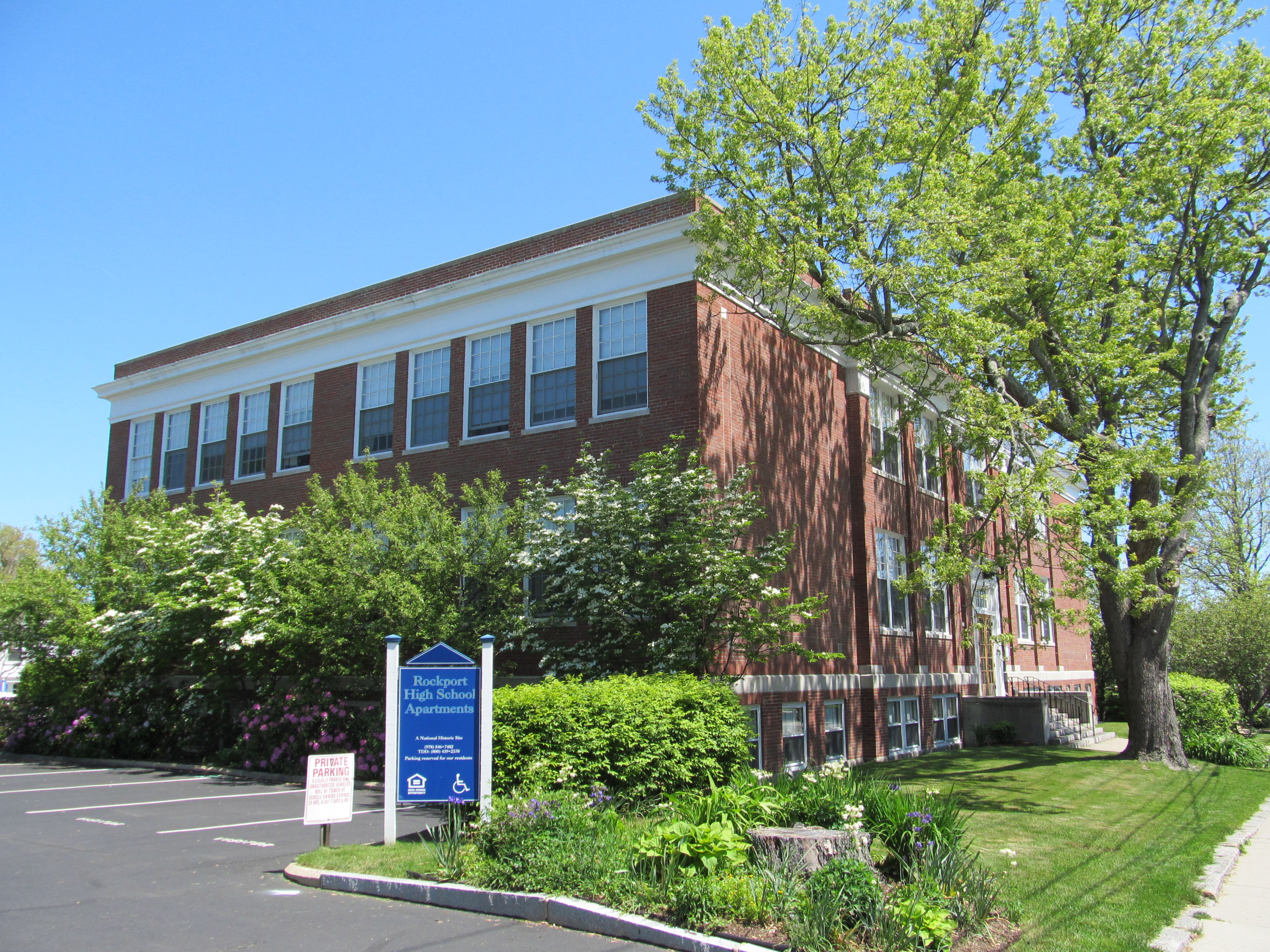
The former Rockport High School, designed by J. Williams Beal, Sons and completed in 1926.

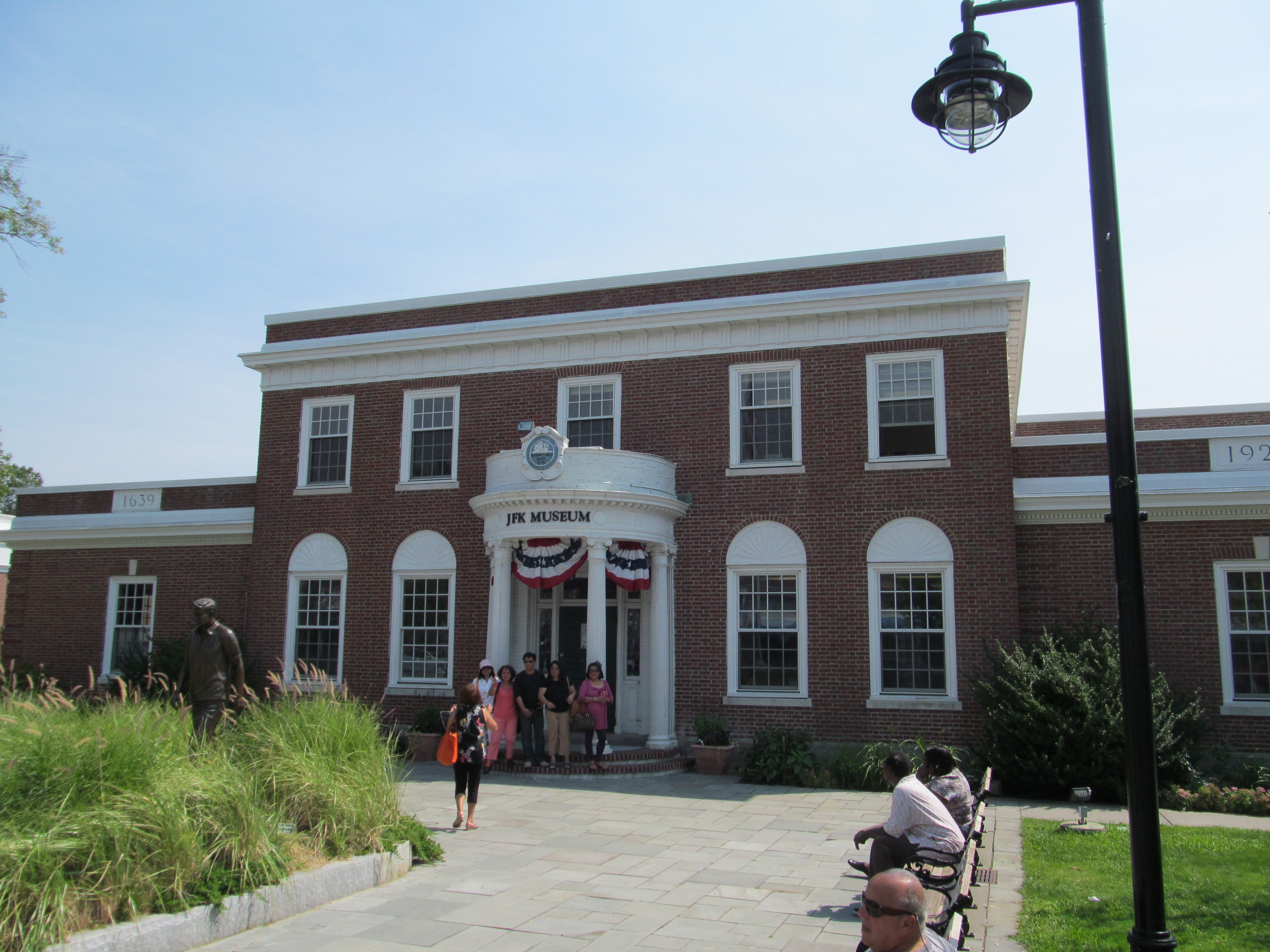
The former Barnstable Town Hall in Hyannis, designed by J. Williams Beal, Sons and completed in 1926.

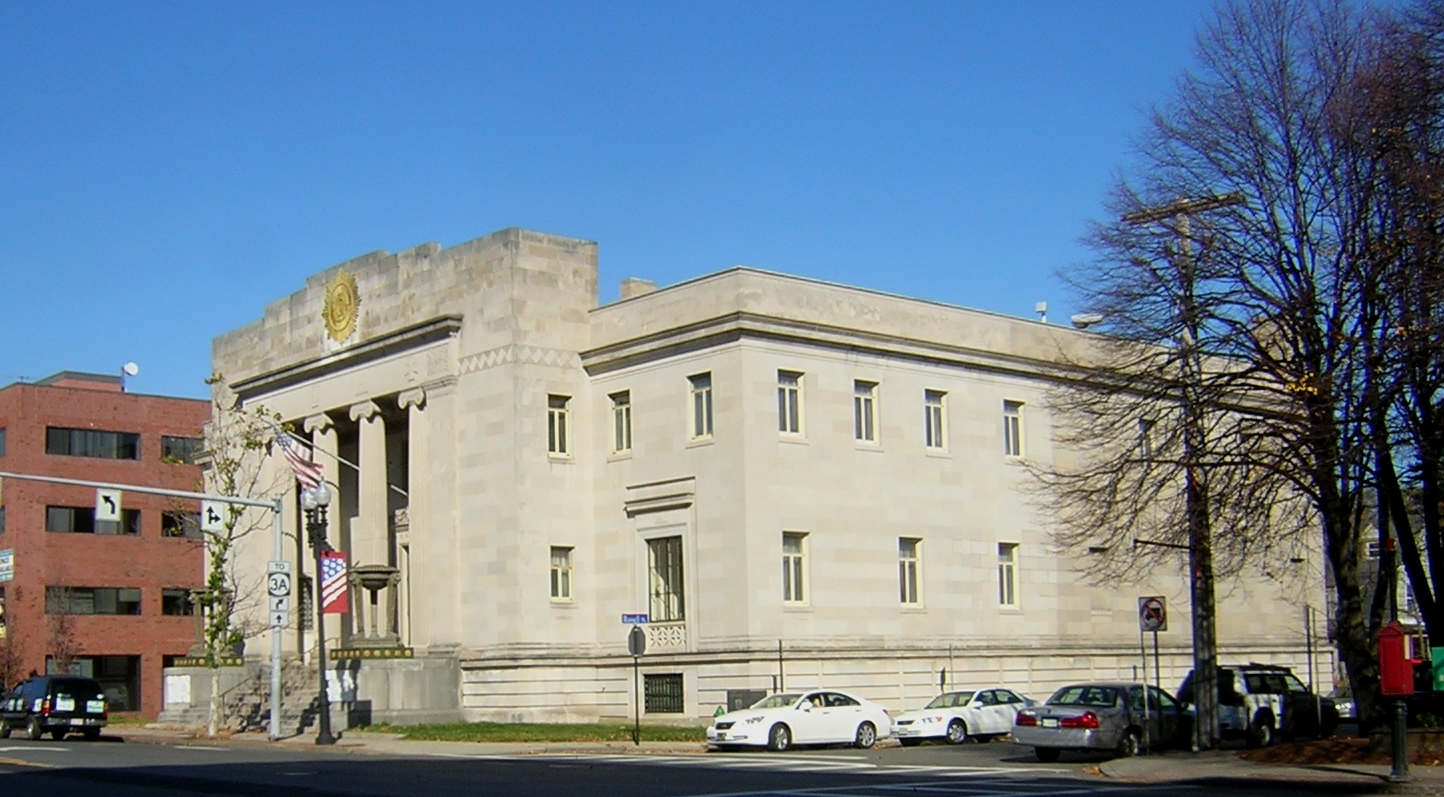
The former Masonic Temple in Quincy, designed by J. Williams Beal, Sons and completed in 1926.

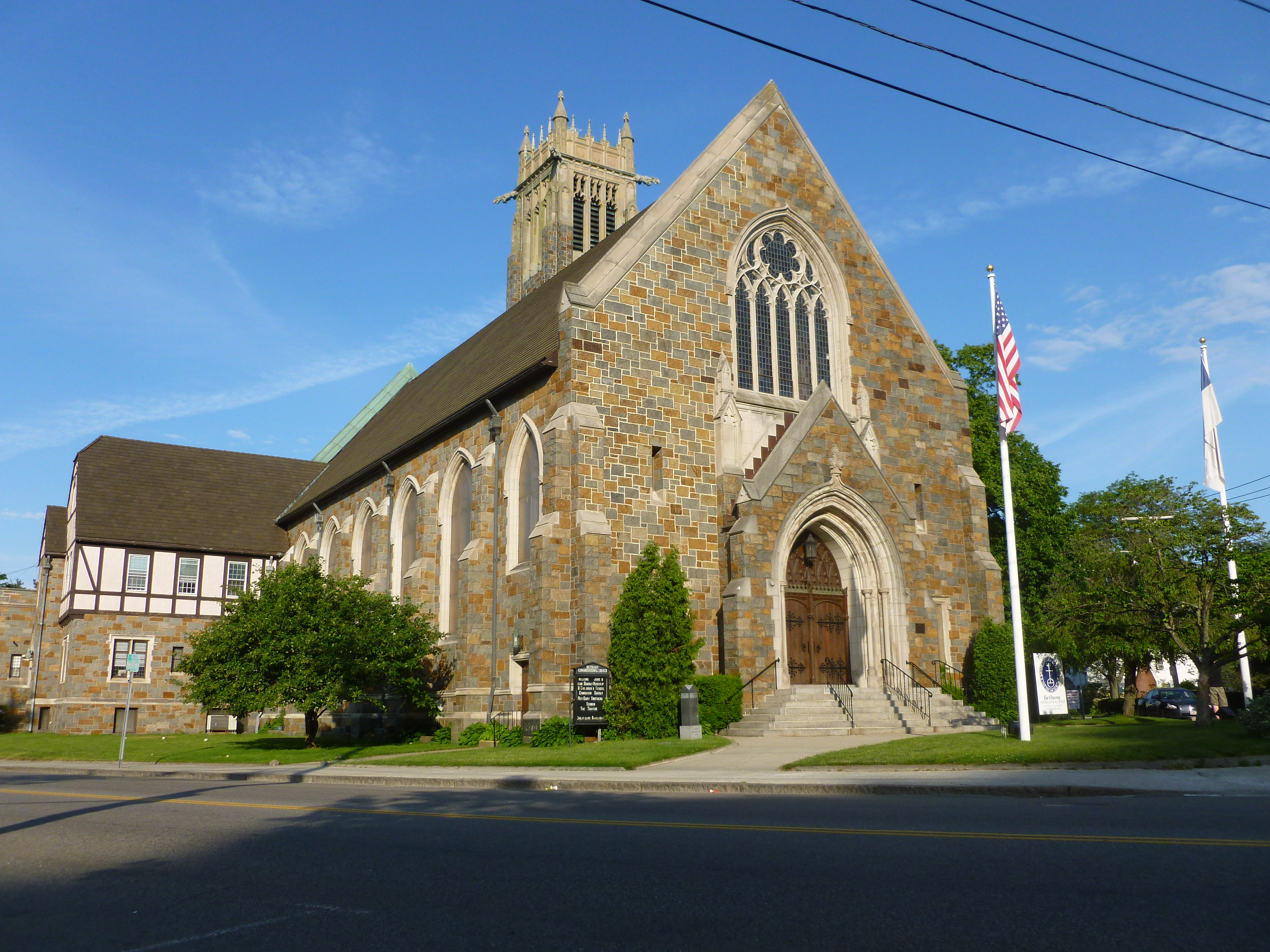
The Bethany Congregational Church in Quincy, designed by J. Williams Beal, Sons and completed in 1927.

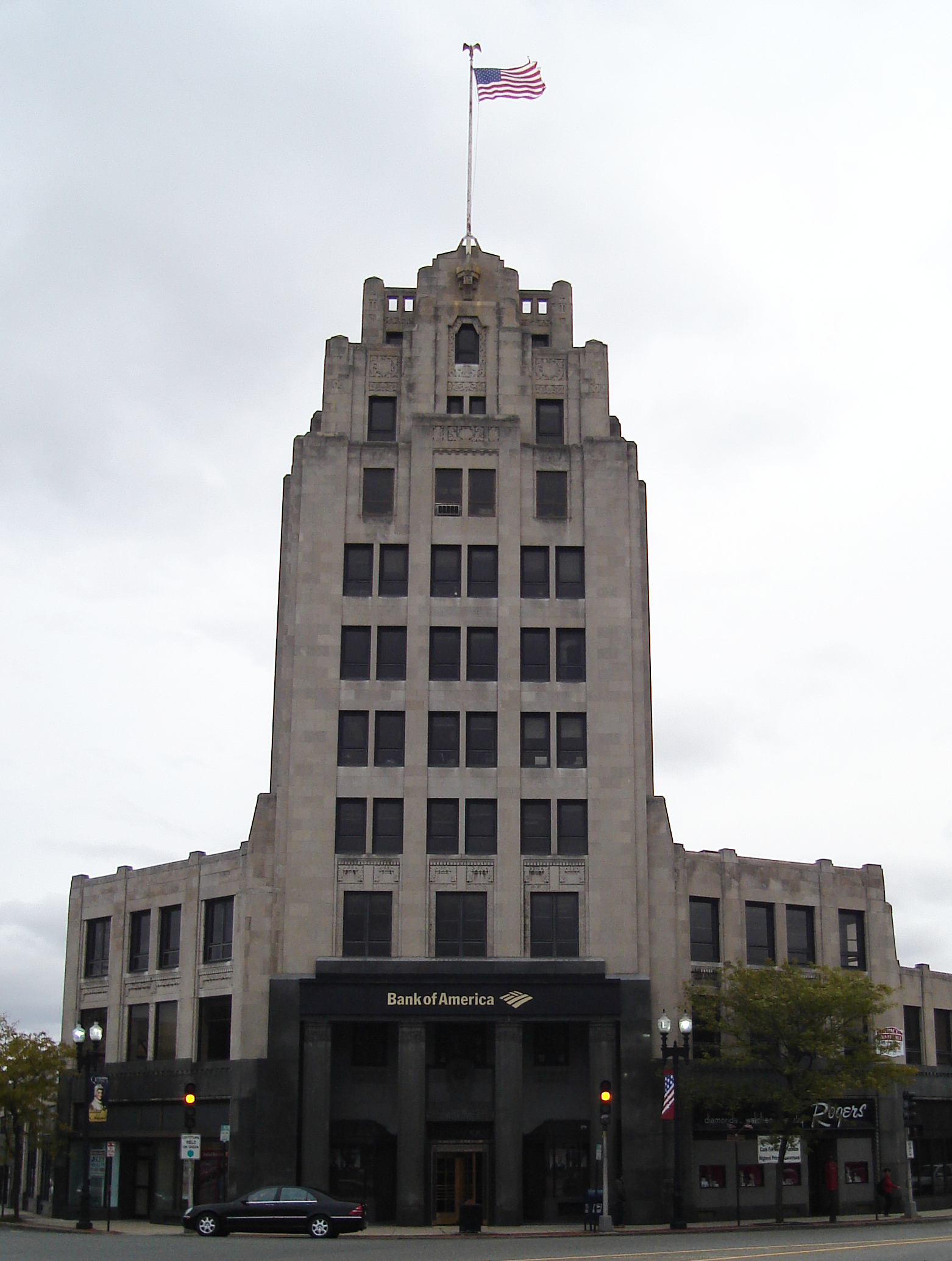
The Granite Trust Building in Quincy, designed by J. Williams Beal, Sons and completed in 1929.

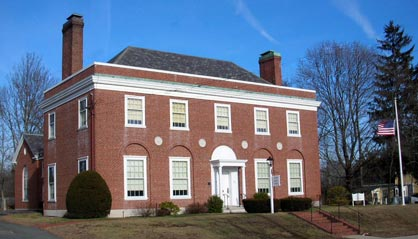
The Dyer Memorial Library in Abington, designed by J. Williams Beal, Sons and completed in 1932.

The now-demolished Melrose High School, designed by J. Williams Beal, Sons and completed in 1933.

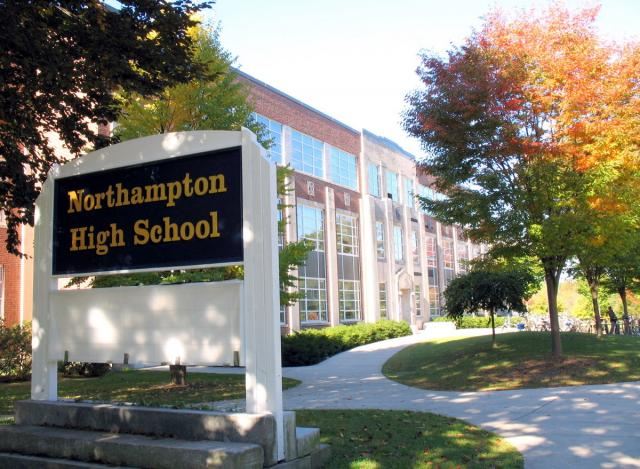
The Northampton High School, designed by J. Williams Beal, Sons and completed in 1941.

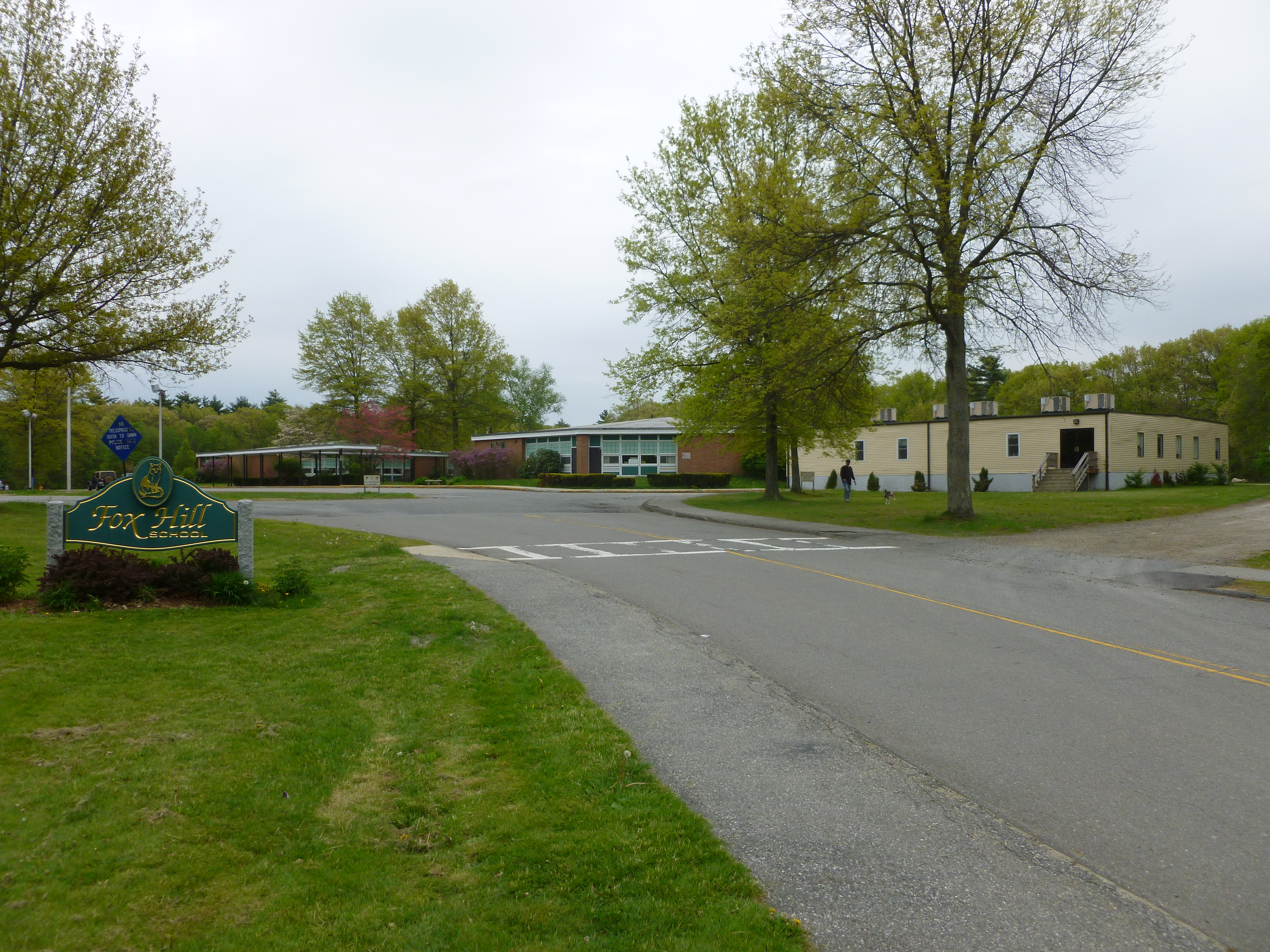
The Fox Hill Elementary School in Burlington, designed by J. Williams Beal, Sons, Granger & Poskus and completed in 1966.

The Mansfield High School, designed by J. Williams Beal, Sons, Granger & Poskus and completed in 1968.

J. Williams Beal, Sons, successor to the office of J. Williams Beal, was a successful architectural firm based in Boston, Massachusetts. Established in 1920 by the sons of the late architect Beal, it remained in business into the 1980s.

== History ==
In 1888, J. Williams Beal established what became a successful architectural practice in Boston. He had three sons, the elder two of which came to work for him. These were John W. Beal and Horatio W. Beal. A third son, Robert Washburn Beal, was a landscape architect.

The firm of J. Williams Beal, Sons was established in early 1920, following the death of J. Williams Beal. The Beal brothers were the sole partners until 1960, when they added H. Story Granger and Raymond W. Dyer, as which point the firm became known as J. Williams Beal, Sons, Granger & Dyer. After Dyer's departure a new partner, Edward A. J. Poskus, was added. Horatio Williams Beal died in 1964. J. Williams Beal, Sons, Granger & Poskus was dissolved upon the death of Granger in 1969. John Woodbridge Beal died in 1971, after which Poskus managed the firm alone. J. Williams Beal, Sons & Poskus lasted at least until the mid-1980s.

== Partners ==
John Woodbridge Beal was born on July 11, 1887, in Hanover, Massachusetts. Beal worked in his father's office for a number of years, until his father's death in 1919. At this point he established the firm of J. Williams Beal, Sons with his brother, Horatio. After Horatio's death in 1964, Beal managed the firm with H. Story Granger and Edward A. J. Poskus. He was active until the firm until his death in 1971.

Horatio Williams Beal was born on September 1, 1889, in Hanover, Massachusetts. He graduated from Harvard University in 1911, and earned a master's degree from the school of architecture in 1915. After his graduation he entered the office of his father, J. Williams Beal. In 1917 he enlisted in the U. S. Navy for service in World War I. In 1919 he returned to Boston, and went back to work in his father's office. Upon his father's death, he and his brother established J. Williams Beal, Sons. Beal remained active in the firm until his death in 1964.

Harold Story Granger attended Columbia University, graduating in 1912. He worked for Nelson & Van Wagener in New York, before embarking on an architectural career in Albany, New York. He later worked in New Haven, Connecticut for the architectural firm of Davis & Walldorff. There he served as the vice-president of the Connecticut chapter of the American Institute of Architects. He later moved to Boston, where he became associated with the firm of J. Williams Beal, Sons. In 1960 he and Raymond W. Dyer became partners in the firm, which became known as J. Williams Beal, Sons, Granger & Dyer. Dyer soon withdrew, and the firm was briefly known as J. Williams Beal, Sons & Granger, after which Edward J. A. Poskus became a partner. J. Williams Beal, Sons, Granger & Poskus was dissolved after Granger's death in 1969.

Raymond Wallace Dyer was born circa 1918 in Portsmouth, New Hampshire. He attended the University of New Hampshire, class of 1941, after a public school education. He came to Massachusetts around 1947, settling in Hingham, after service in World War II. He entered the Beal office at an unknown date, but was experienced enough to be made a partner alongside H. Story Granger in 1960. His time at the firm of J. Williams Beal, Sons, Granger & Dyer was brief, as he left to practice on his own in Hingham. He died in 1976.

Edward Alphonse John Poskus was born on January 21, 1921. Like Dyer, he fought in WWII. He joined the Beals at an unknown date, but held a position of high responsibility by 1959. In 1962, after the departure of Raymond W. Dyer, he became a partner in J. Williams Beal, Sons, Granger & Poskus. Upon Granger's death, Poskus was the sole partner of what became J. Williams Beal, Sons & Poskus. In 1980, he relocated the office to Brockton. He retired a few years afterward, and served as building inspector for the town of Ipswich. He died in 2007.

== Architectural works ==
=== J. Williams Beal, Sons, 1920–1960 ===
- 1922 – Dean Emery house, 18 Quissett Harbor Rd, Falmouth, Massachusetts
- 1924 – Elks Building, 1218 Hancock St, Quincy, Massachusetts
  - NRHP-listed in 1989.
- 1924 – Hyannis Trust Company Building, 307 Main St, Hyannis, Massachusetts
  - Demolished.
- 1924 – Lowell Cooperative Bank Building, 18 Hurd St, Lowell, Massachusetts
- 1924 – Masonic Temple, 357 Main St, Hyannis, Massachusetts
- 1925 – Repertory Theatre of Boston, 264 Huntington Ave, Boston, Massachusetts
  - Now home to the Huntington Theatre Company.
- 1925 – Rockport High School (former), 4 Broadway, Rockport, Massachusetts
  - NRHP-listed in 1997.
- 1926 – Baptist Temple, 205 S Main St, Fall River, Massachusetts
- 1926 – Barnstable Town Hall, 397 Main St, Hyannis, Massachusetts
  - Now the John F. Kennedy Hyannis Museum.
- 1926 – Masonic Temple, 1170 Hancock St, Quincy, Massachusetts
  - NRHP-listed in 1989.
- 1926 – Peoples Savings Bank Building, 181 Main St, Marlborough, Massachusetts
- 1927 – Bethany Congregational Church, 10 Spear St, Quincy, Massachusetts
  - NRHP-listed in 1989.
- 1927 – Leroy Clark house, 503 Sippewissett Rd, Falmouth, Massachusetts
- 1927 – Edmund Q. Sylvester School, 495 Hanover St, Hanover, Massachusetts
- 1927 – Whitman High School, 20 Essex St, Whitman, Massachusetts
  - Demolished in 2007.
- 1928 – Athol Savings Bank Building, 444 Main St, Athol, Massachusetts
- 1928 – First National Bank Building, 1 King St, Northampton, Massachusetts
- 1928 – Rockland High School, 100 Taunton Ave, Rockland, Massachusetts
  - Demolished.
- 1929 – Granite Trust Company Building, 1400 Hancock St, Quincy, Massachusetts
  - NRHP-listed in 1989.
- 1929 – Guay's System Bakeries Building, 1455 Hancock St, Quincy, Massachusetts
- 1930 – Abington Savings Bank Building, 533 Washington St, Abington, Massachusetts
- 1930 – Norfolk County Bank Building, 1319 Beacon St, Brookline, Massachusetts
- 1931 – Abington Mutual Fire Insurance Company Building, 536 Washington St, Abington, Massachusetts
- 1932 – Dyer Memorial Library, 30 Centre Ave, Abington, Massachusetts
- 1933 – Melrose High School (former), 350 Lynn Fells Pkwy, Melrose, Massachusetts
  - Demolished in 2005.
- 1933 – United States Post Office, 39 Webster St, Rockland, Massachusetts
- 1935 – Central Fire Station, 6 Taylor St, Saugus, Massachusetts
- 1935 – Franklin School, 169 N Franklin St, Holbrook, Massachusetts
- 1936 – Norwell High School (former), 322 Main St, Norwell, Massachusetts
- 1937 – Abington High School (former), 1071 Washington St, Abington, Massachusetts
- 1937 – Athol High School (former), 494 School St, Athol, Massachusetts
  - NRHP-listed in 2011.
- 1938 – Hunnewell Elementary School, 28 Cameron St, Wellesley, Massachusetts
  - Demolished in 2022.
- 1939 – Burlington High School (former), 61 Center St, Burlington, Massachusetts
- 1941 – Northampton High School, 380 Elm St, Northampton, Massachusetts
- 1945 – South Shore Hospital, 55 Fogg Rd, Weymouth, Massachusetts
- 1950 – Chatham Elementary School, 147 Depot Rd, Chatham, Massachusetts
- 1950 – Ella F. Osborn Elementary School, 345 Main St, Norwell, Massachusetts
- 1950 – Woodland Hall, Lasell University, Newton, Massachusetts
- 1951 – Cold Spring Elementary School, 25 Alden St, Plymouth, Massachusetts
- 1952 – West Junior High School, 271 West St, Brockton, Massachusetts
- 1954 – Deer Hill School, 208 Sohier St, Cohasset, Massachusetts
- 1957 – Rockland Senior High School, 52 MacKinlay Way, Rockland, Massachusetts
- 1959 - East Junior High School, 464 Centre St, Brockton, Massachusetts

=== J. Williams Beal, Sons, Granger & Dyer, 1960–1962 ===
- 1962 – Franklin High School (former), 224 Oak St, Franklin, Massachusetts

=== J. Williams Beal, Sons, Granger & Poskus, 1962–1969 ===
- 1966 – Fox Hill Elementary School, 196 Fox Hill Rd, Burlington, Massachusetts
- 1968 – Mansfield High School, 250 East St, Mansfield, Massachusetts
- 1971 – Rupert A. Nock Middle School, 70 Low St, Newburyport, Massachusetts

=== J. Williams Beal, Sons & Poskus, from 1969 ===
- 1977 – South Shore Vocational Technical High School addition, 476 Webster St, Hanover, Massachusetts
- 1984 – Northbridge Elementary school addition, 30 Cross St, Whitinsville, Massachusetts
