= Callahan Tunnel =

Tunnel in Boston

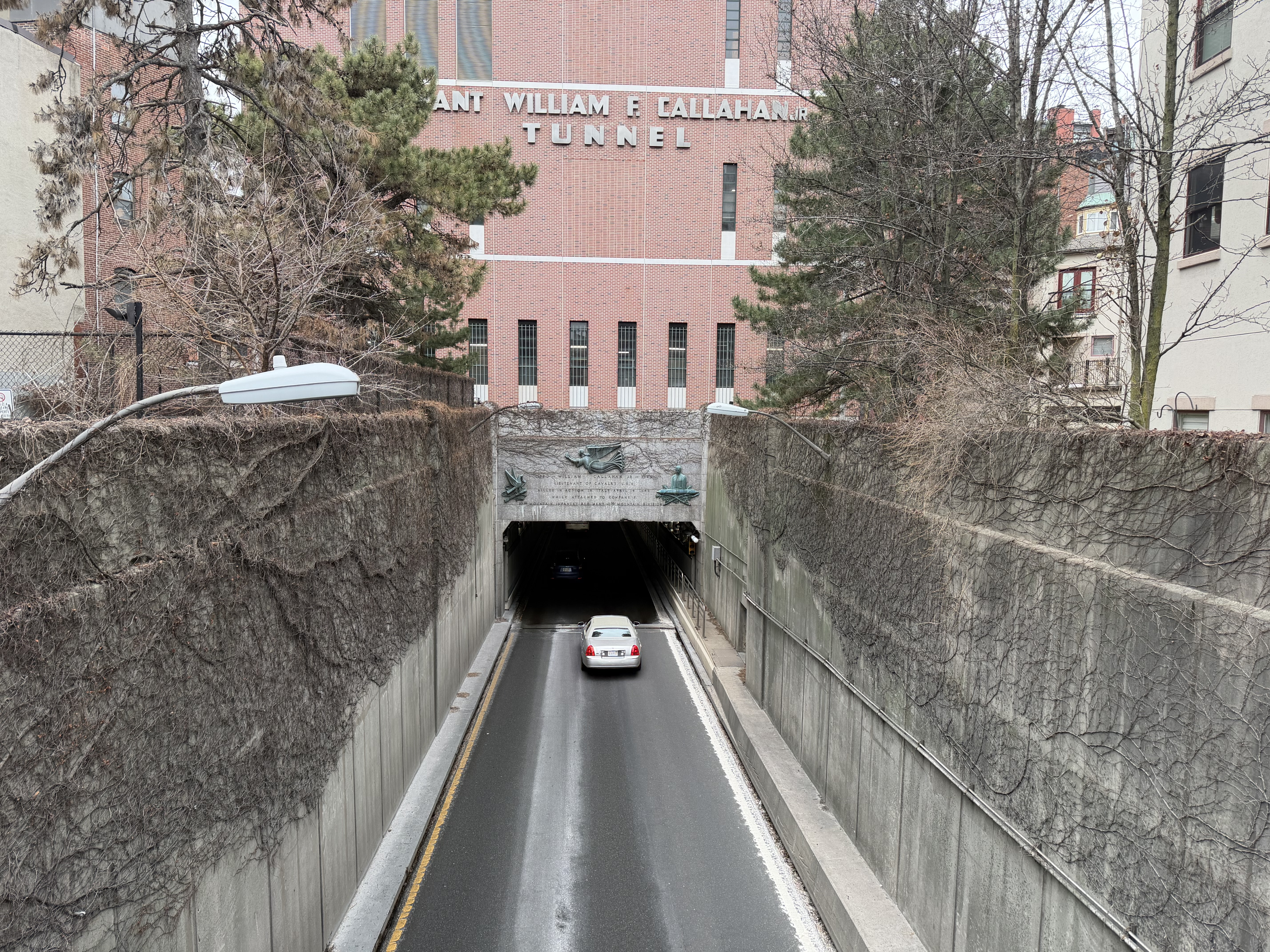
- The downtown Boston entrance to the tunnel
- Interactive map of Callahan Tunnel

Overview
- Location: Boston, Massachusetts
- Coordinates: 42°22′04″N 71°2′46″W
- Status: Open
- Route: Route 1A north
- Start: Downtown Boston
- End: East Boston

Operation
- Constructed: high-strength steel and concrete infill
- Opened: November 11, 1961
- Owner: Commonwealth of Massachusetts
- Operator: Massachusetts Department of Transportation
- Toll: Between $0.20 and $2.05

Technical
- Length: 0.96 mi (1.54 km)
- No. of lanes: 2
- Operating speed: 40 mph (64 km/h)
- Tunnel clearance: 13.4 ft (4.1 m)
- Width: 24.2 ft (7.4 m)

The Lieutenant William F. Callahan Jr. Tunnel (colloquially Callahan Tunnel) is a road tunnel under Boston Harbor between the North End and East Boston. It carries northbound Massachusetts Route 1A, forming a one-way pair with the Sumner Tunnel. Opened in 1961 to complement the Sumner Tunnel, it carried all northbound traffic under the harbor until the Ted Williams Tunnel opened in the 1990s as part of the Big Dig.

== History ==
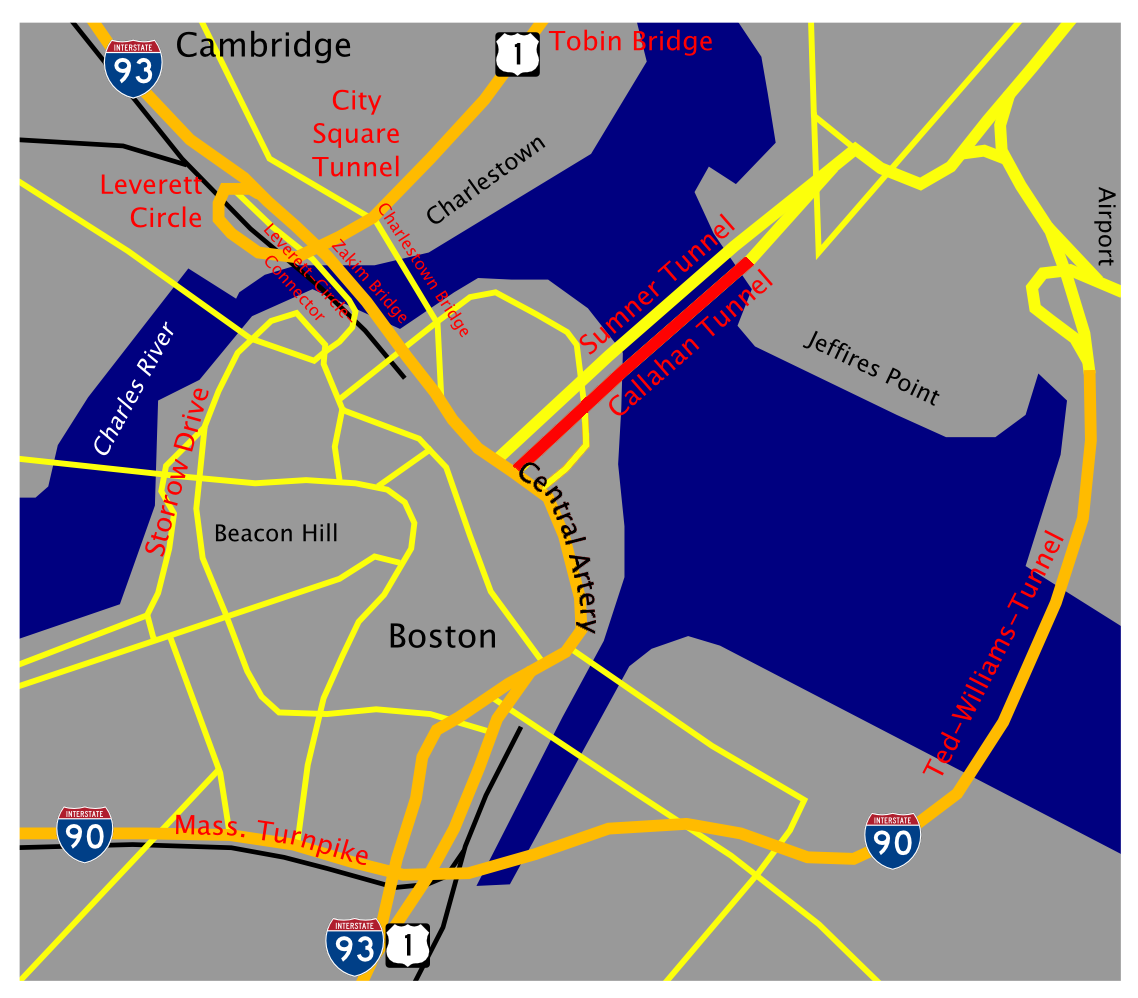
Map showing the Callahan Tunnel (in red)

The tunnel was opened in 1961 to complement the Sumner Tunnel. The under-construction tunnel had been named in February 1960 after William F. Callahan Jr. – the son of Turnpike chairman William F. Callahan – who was killed in Italy during World War II. A toll plaza was located at the East Boston end of the tunnel. On May 2, 1983, one-way tolling was implemented in the Sumner and Callahan tunnels and on the Tobin Bridge. The Callahan Tunnel toll plaza was removed, while tolls on the Sumner Tunnel doubled to 60 cents.

Repairs to the tunnel were made in the early 1990s. The Big Dig project, which replaced the elevated Central Artery with a tunnel, modified the western approaches to the tunnel. Access from northbound I-93 was closed in January 2003 after a ramp from I-93 to the Ted Williams Tunnel opened. A new ramp from New Chardon Street opened in March 2003. When the northbound lanes of the Central Artery tunnel opened later that month, they did not include a ramp to the Callahan Tunnel. The original ramp from North Street closed in November 2003, leaving access to the Callahan Tunnel only from New Chardon Street and southbound I-93.

A major overhaul began in December 2013, which completely replaced the deck, curbs, and wall panels; and cleaned and repaired its ceiling and vent systems (above the ceiling and below the deck). It was planned for three phases: complete closure from December 27, 2013, to March 12, 2014, during deck and curb replacement; closures 11pm–5am from March 13, 2014, to late August 2014 for wall panel replacement; and final work until November 2014. McCourt Construction of South Boston was awarded the $19.3 million contract in August. During closures, Logan-bound traffic was diverted into the Ted Williams Tunnel, Tobin Bridge, and Massachusetts Route 1A South via Revere or East Boston.

In 2016, cashless tolling systems were installed in both directions – entering the Sumner Tunnel and exiting the Callahan Tunnel – as part of a plan to modernize toll collection the Boston area. As of 2016, a toll of $1.50 is charged for non-commercial two-axle vehicles with a Massachusetts E-ZPass, while non-Massachusetts E-ZPass holders are charged $1.75. Vehicles without E-ZPass are charged $2.05 through MassDOT's Pay By Plate MA program. For residents of certain Boston ZIP codes, a discount is in effect using an E-ZPass transponder, costing $0.20.
