= Masonic Temple (Quincy, Massachusetts) =

- U.S. National Register of Historic Places
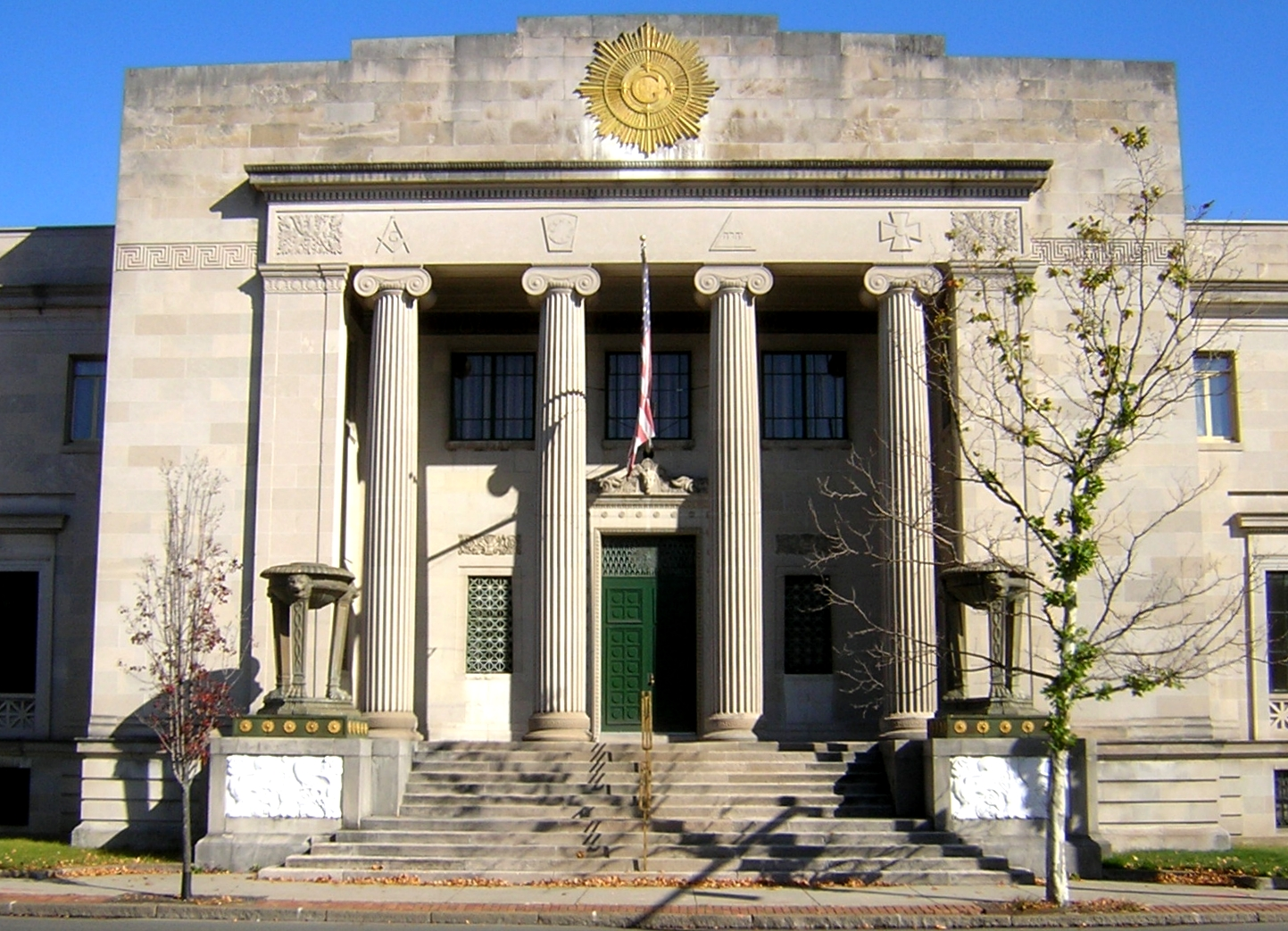

- Location within Massachusetts Location within the United States
- Location: 1170 Hancock St., Quincy, Massachusetts
- Coordinates: 42°15′12.5″N 71°0′17″W
- Area: 0.5 acres (0.20 ha)
- Built: 1926
- Architect: J. Williams Beal, Sons
- Architectural style: Classical Revival
- MPS: Quincy MRA
- NRHP reference No.: 89001952
- Added to NRHP: November 13, 1989

The Quincy Masonic Temple was a historic Masonic temple at 1170 Hancock Street, Quincy, Massachusetts. It was built in 1926 and added to the National Register of Historic Places in 1989. The building was home to three "Blue" Masonic Lodges, two Appendant Bodies: York Rite, Grotto, and two Youth Groups: DeMolay and Rainbow. After a fire in 2013 building was renovated ten years later and the building was leased by a bar and restaurant Masons Steak House which opened for Christmas 2024.

Rural Lodge was founded in 1801. Macedonian Lodge was founded in 1892. Milton Lodge was founded in 1922.

== Architectural significance ==
The Quincy Masonic Temple was an outstanding example of a Neoclassical building. It had three floors, which included a theater/ballroom, three separate lodge rooms, elaborate ante-rooms, and an oak-paneled library.

The imposing main entrance is set on a high basement of regular ashlar blocks, with a flat roof hidden by a shaped parapet. Dominating the facade is a projecting pavilion composed of four giant Ionic columns in antis supporting an architrave replete with Masonic symbols. A large cascade of steps leading up to the main entrance is flanked by metal tripod tables each on a base decorated with a griffin on a terracotta plaque. The main lobby was remarkable for its Egyptian styling, featuring battered entranceways, papyrus ornaments and sphinxes. This lead via two sets of doors to the large Main Lodge room, which was used for Rural Lodge meetings and other large events, and featured neoclassical furniture and furnishings and a classical landscape fresco signed by the artist, Carroll Bill.

The architects, J. Williams Beal, Sons, designed other nearby landmark buildings in downtown Quincy, including the Art Deco Granite Trust, The Patriot Ledger Building and the neo-Gothic Bethany Congregational Church which is adjacent to the Richardson Thomas Crane Public Library. The organ was a regularly used and fully working EM Skinner opus 661 of 1927, with 470 pipes.

The building was infrequently open to the public, but visitors were invited to see the building interior at two annual open houses. .

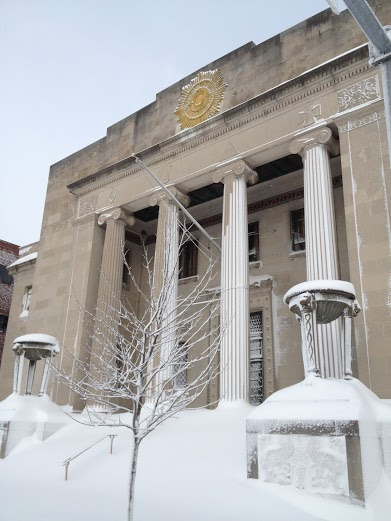
Quincy Masonic Temple during Blizzard Nemo 2013

The building was heavily damaged during a 4-alarm fire which occurred on September 30, 2013 after insulation caught fire while employees were working on a basement heat line. Most of the structure's interior and contents were destroyed, but the building's Longleaf Pine and Douglas Fir joists were able to be salvaged and recycled into flooring. The joist lumber was originally purchased from the Geo. McQuesten Company of Boston.Only the front façade of the building remains. It is hoped the entrance and facade will be preserved and incorporated into any future redevelopment of the site.

After a fire in 2013 building was renovated ten years later and the building was leased by a bar and restaurant Masons Steak House which opened for Christmas 2024

== See also ==
- National Register of Historic Places listings in Quincy, Massachusetts
