= Holyoke Catholic High School =

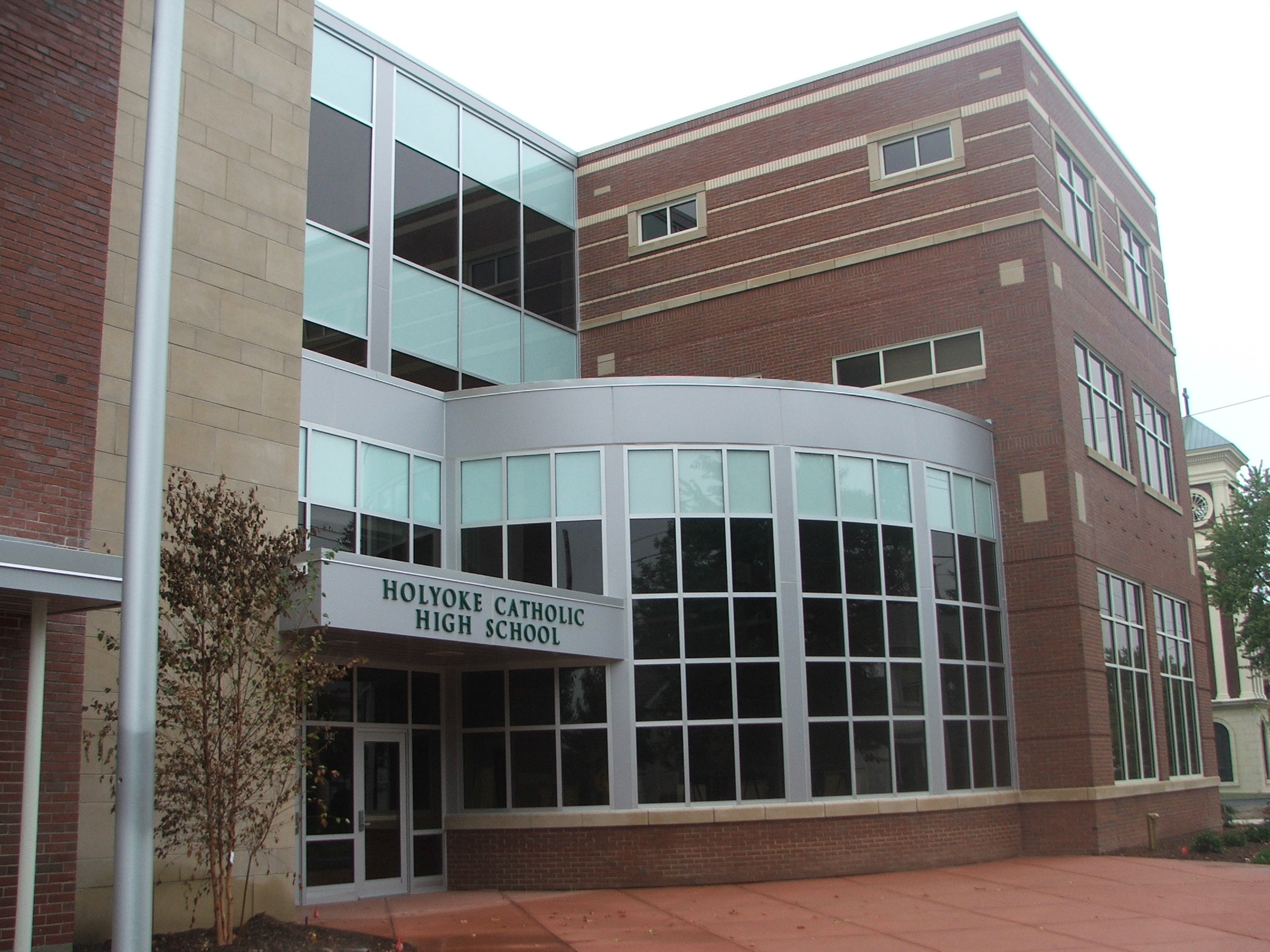
- Former Holyoke Catholic High School in Chicopee, Massachusetts

Location
- 134 Springfield Street; Chicopee, Massachusetts 01013; United States; 42°8′45″N 72°36′18″W

Information
- Type: Private
- Motto: That All May Be One
- Religious affiliations: Roman Catholic, Sisters of St. Joseph
- Established: 1963
- Closed: 2016
- Oversight: Roman Catholic Diocese of Springfield in Massachusetts
- Principal: Maryann Linnehan
- Faculty: 24
- Grades: 9–12
- Gender: Co-educational
- Enrollment: 275 (2014)
- Average class size: 18–24
- Colors: Green and Gold
- Team name: Gaels
- Accreditation: New England Association of Schools and Colleges
- Yearbook: Unitas
- Tuition: $8,800
- Alumni: 7,400+
- Website: www.holyokecatholichigh.org

Holyoke Catholic High School was a private, Roman Catholic high school in Holyoke, Massachusetts, United States. It was located in the Roman Catholic Diocese of Springfield in Massachusetts.

In 2015, Holyoke Catholic High School merged with Cathedral High School to form a new regional Catholic school that was completed in 2016 as Pope Francis High School.

== Background ==
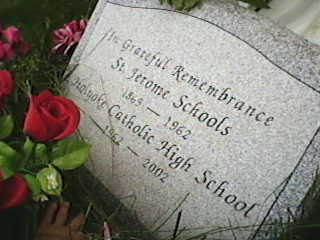
Stone in remembrance of original location, Holyoke

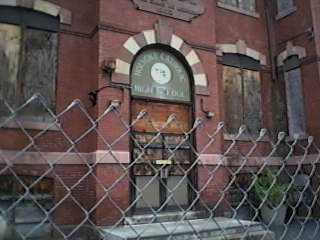
Present-day Mara Hall at original location, Holyoke

In the early part of the 20th century, many Roman Catholic churches started schools to educate children of their parish. Though the schools were relatively successful, they were small, and it was difficult for small parish high schools to offer competitive athletic programs.

Monsignor Timothy J. Leary, headmaster and athletic director at St. Jerome High School in Holyoke, had the idea to bring parish teams together to play as one so they could compete against larger high schools. In the fall of 1947, the parish high schools of Holy Rosary, Sacred Heart, and St. Jerome played sports for the first time under the banner of Holyoke Catholic. "So that all may be one" was the motto for Holyoke Catholic.

The athletic partnership proved successful, and in 1963 the Diocese of Springfield would officially merge the three parish high schools to form one school, Holyoke Catholic High School. Later, the high school Precious Blood Parish would also join Holyoke Catholic.

Holyoke Catholic High School, although composed of students from the four founding schools, began to serve an increasing number of students from throughout western Massachusetts. Neighboring cities and towns saw Holyoke Catholic as an option in education, and the school grew into a larger regional high school.

At first, the school was located in the building at St. Jerome Parish in Holyoke. Soon, however, the school found the need to use other buildings in the neighboring area. Temporary trailers were also brought in to accommodate a student population from throughout western Massachusetts. After several decades of use, the buildings' condition had deteriorated, and the school was slated to be closed. However, a grassroots campaign to save the school was started and led by four alumni: Jeffrey Trask, Michael Beauchemin, Jay Green, and Jay. Eventually, a temporary location was found. During the summer of 2002, the school moved to the site of the former St. Hyacinth Seminary in Granby, Massachusetts. Holyoke Catholic stayed in Granby for six years. The campus, though large, was isolated, and the search for a more suitable permanent home continued.

In 2008, the Assumption Parish School property near Elms College on Springfield Street in Chicopee was selected, and in this location a new school was constructed. As a part of the move, a partnership with Elms College involving the use of some Elms facilities and the opportunity for Holyoke Catholic upperclassmen to take courses at Elms.

Despite the moves to Granby and Chicopee, the school still used St. Jerome Parish in Holyoke for its commencement ceremonies.

== Board of trustees ==
Mr. David J. O'Connor, Chair - Mr. Jeffrey A. Trask, Vice Chair - Mrs. Theresa Kitchell, Principal - Sr. M. Andrea Ciszewski, FSSJ, Superintendent - Mrs. Christine Duval - Mr. Skal Guidi - Sr. Carol Hebert, SSJ - Mr. Kevin Kervick - Mr. Gerald Korona - Mr. George Moreau - Mrs. Janice Peters - Sr. Mary Reap, IHM, Ph.D. - Sr. Mary Shea, SSJ - Mrs. Lisa C. Siddall, Esq. - Mr. Michael Sobon - Mr. Charles Swider - Ms. Karen Turcotte - Mr. Michael Williams

== Athletics ==
Holyoke Catholic High School was part of the Massachusetts Interscholastic Athletic Association, an organization of 368 high schools which sponsor athletic activities in 33 sports.

The school's athletic mascot was a gael, a reflection on the school's Irish background. The school's colors were green and gold.
