= Bethany Congregational Church (Quincy, Massachusetts) =

Historic church in Massachusetts, United States

- U.S. National Register of Historic Places
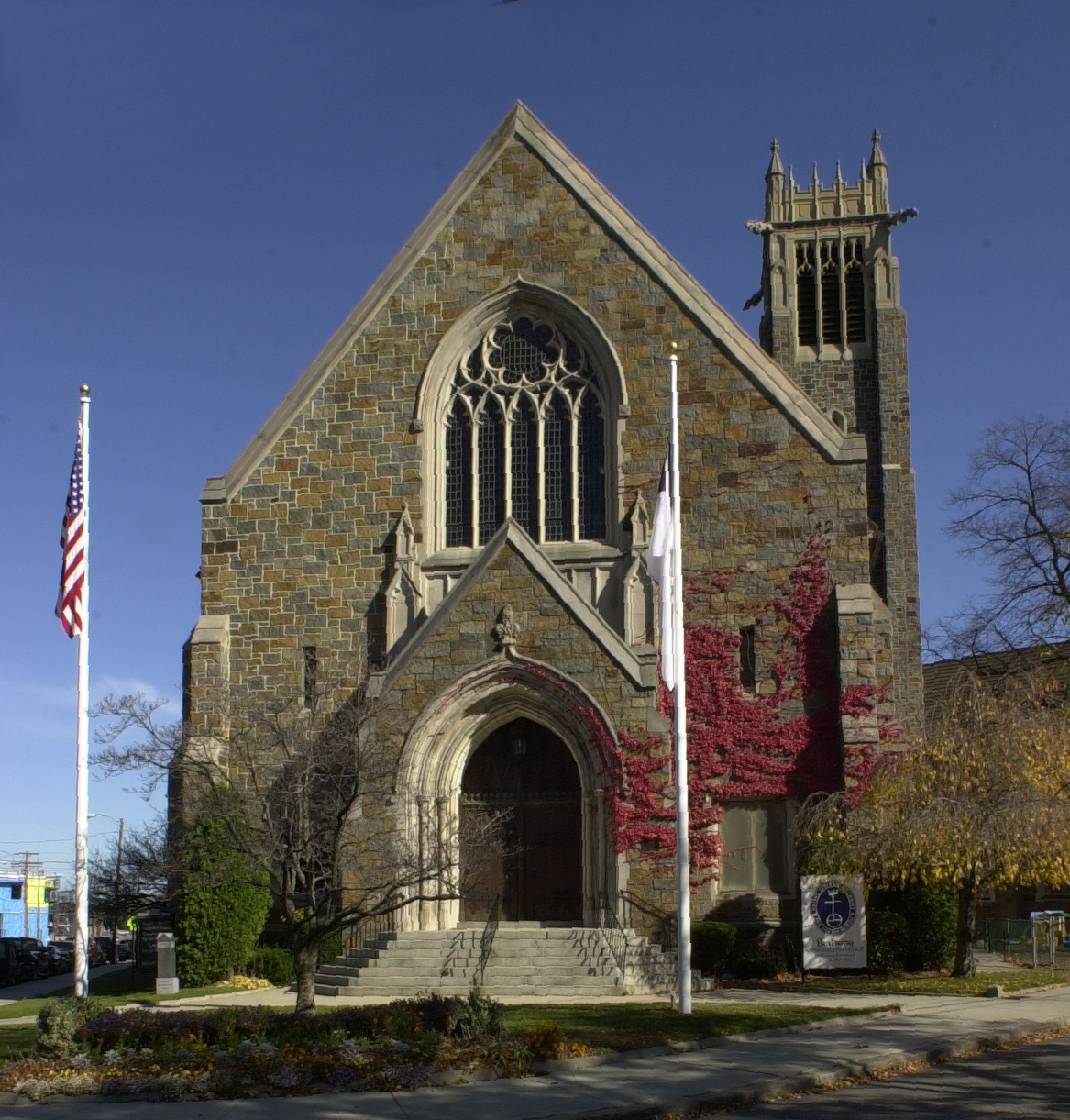

- Location within Massachusetts Location within the United States
- Location: 18 Spear St., Quincy, Massachusetts
- Coordinates: 42°15′8″N 71°0′4″W
- Area: 0.8 acres (0.32 ha)
- Built: 1927
- Architect: J. Williams Beal, Sons
- Architectural style: Late Gothic Revival
- Website: www.bethanycongchurch.org
- MPS: Quincy MRA
- NRHP reference No.: 89001374
- Added to NRHP: September 20, 1989

Bethany Congregational Church is a historic Congregational church building at 18 Spear Street in Quincy, Massachusetts. The Gothic Revival building was designed and built in 1927 to a design by J. Williams Beal, Sons, for a congregation which was established in 1832. The building was listed on the National Register of Historic Places in 1989.

== Description and history ==
The Bethany Congregational Church is located at the northeast corner of Spear and Coddington Streets in downtown Quincy, just east of the Thomas Crane Public Library. It is a roughly T-shaped stone structure, with a tall square tower at the right (southern) corner of the T. The main facade, facing the street corner, has a projecting section in which the entrance is deeply recessed under an arch. An elaborate multipart stained glass window stands in the gable above this projecting section. The corners and side walls are buttressed, with three-part Gothic windows in the side walls. The tower is the building's most striking element, with three-part rectangular windows below a pinnacled parapet.

The congregation was formed in 1832. Its second building, erected in 1870, was torn down in the 1920s to provide space for the Granite Trust Company building. That company gave the church this parcel of land, on which the church was built in 1927. It was designed by J. Williams Beal, Sons, architects responsible for the Trust Company building and the Adams Building.

== Gallery ==
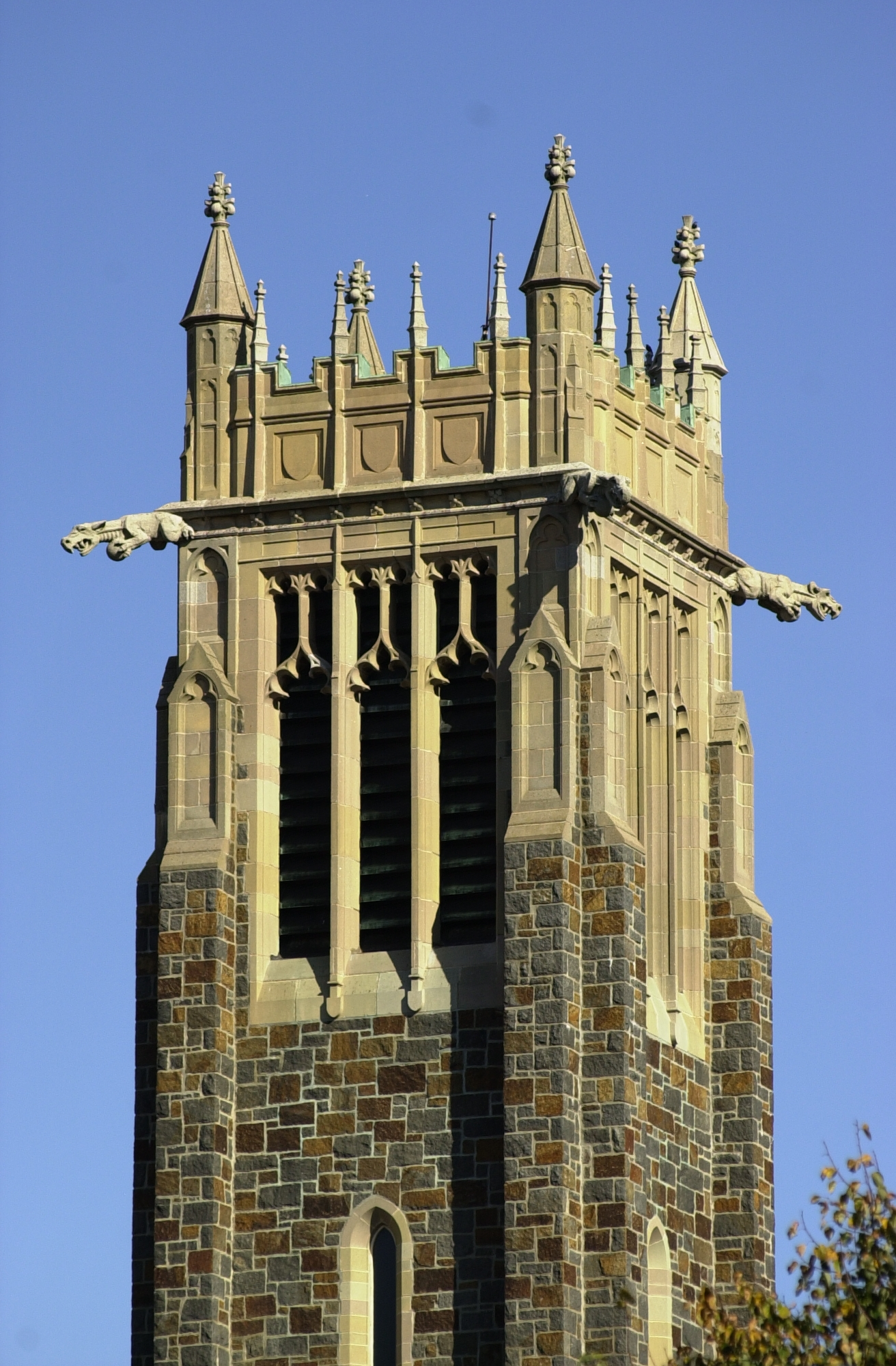

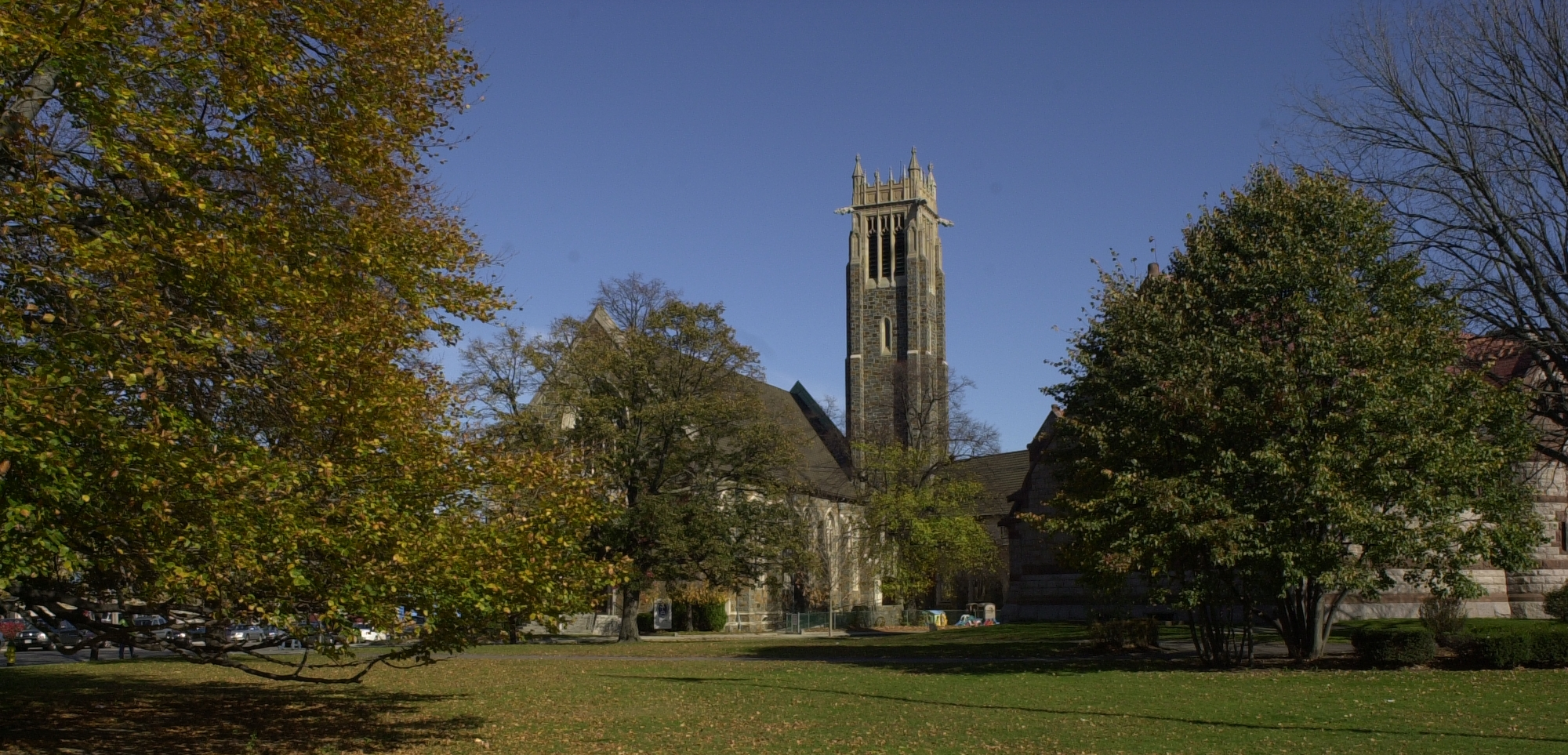

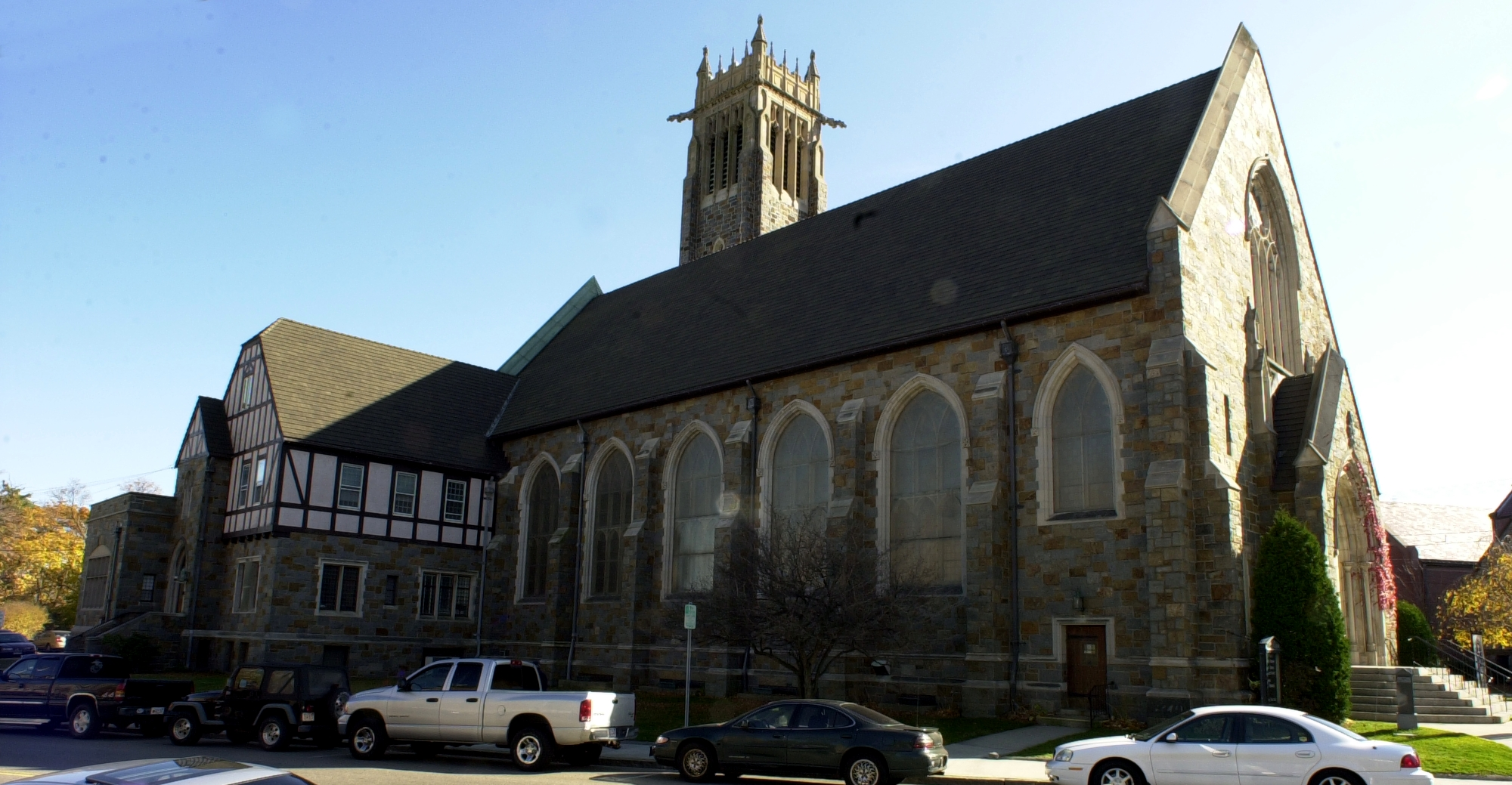

== See also ==
- National Register of Historic Places listings in Quincy, Massachusetts
