= Old Athol High School =

- Athol High School
- U.S. National Register of Historic Places
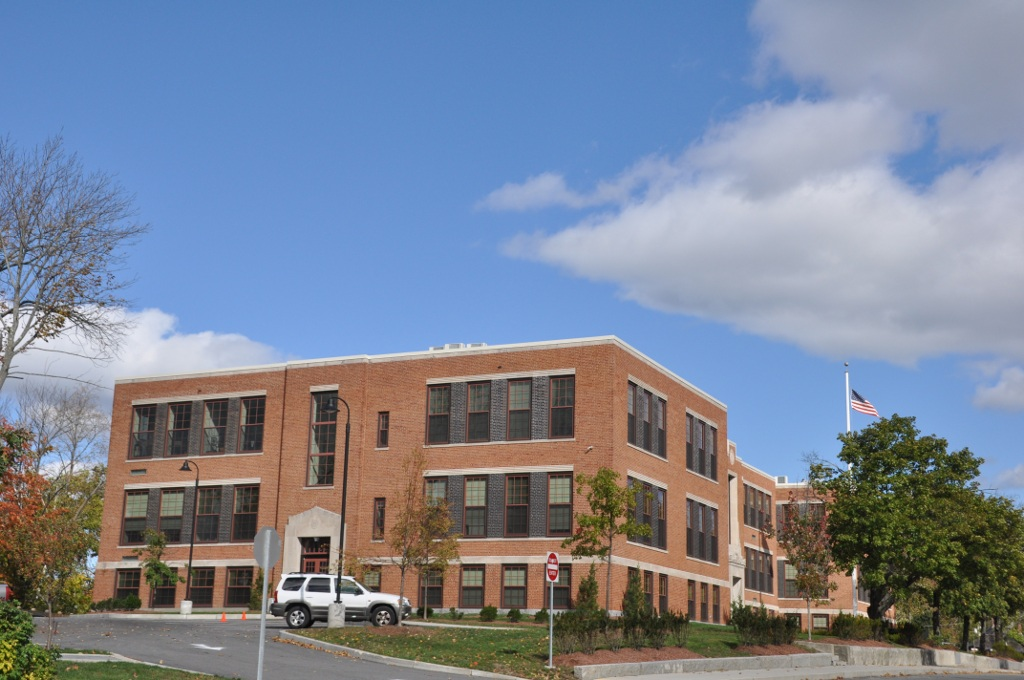

- Location within Massachusetts Location within the United States
- Location: 494 School St., Athol, Massachusetts
- Coordinates: 42°35′40″N 72°13′13″W
- Area: 2.1 acres (0.85 ha)
- Built: 1915; 1937
- Architect: Funk & Wilcox (1915); J. Williams Beal, Sons (1937)
- Architectural style: Art Deco
- NRHP reference No.: 11000022
- Added to NRHP: February 18, 2011

The Old Athol High School building is an historic school building at 494 School Street in Athol, Massachusetts. It is now a senior living center. The H-shaped two story brick Art Deco building was constructed in several stages between 1915 and 1937. The building originated with a central portion that was built in 1892, to which two sides of the H were added in 1915. In 1937 the original 1892 central portion was demolished and replaced by the present central section. The building served as the town's high school until 1957 when it was used for junior high and middle grades in the Athol-Royalston Regional School District. It served that purpose until 2003. The building was listed on the National Register of Historic Places in 2011. It has been converted to residential use.

== Description and history ==
The Old Athol High School is located on a plateau above a bend in the Millers River, about 0.5 miles (0.80 km) east of the downtown center of Athol. It is located on the north side of School Street, from which it is separated by a low stone retaining wall dating to the 19th century. Its H shape is oriented with one opening of the H to the south, and the other to the north. The right leg of the H has a widened northern end. Each of the wings is fronted by two bands of three sash windows on each level, which share stone sills and lintels and are divided within each group by panels of dark brick. The central pavilion has groups of four windows on either side of the main entrance, similarly styled except that the dividing panels are considerably narrower. The main entrance projects slightly, framed by a surround with Art Deco stylistic elements.

The town's first high school was built on this site in 1856. A new school was built here in 1892, as part of a program for greatly expanding the town's schools in response to rapid population growth. Continued growth prompted the addition of the two wings in 1915, which were designed by George Funk and William Wilcox. The central pavilion was built in 1937 with funding support from the federal Public Works Administration, a Depression-era jobs program. This section was designed by J. Williams Beal, Sons, a firm working out of Boston with credit for a number of school designs in the state. The Art Deco style of this element, popular at that time, is extremely rare in Athol. In 1957, a new high school was built after the town joined with Royalston to form a combined school district, and this building was used as a junior high school. It was closed in 2003, and adapted for residential use as a senior living center in 2012.

== See also ==
- National Register of Historic Places listings in Worcester County, Massachusetts
