= Roger L Putnam Vocational-Technical High School =

Roger L. Putnam Vocational-Technical High School
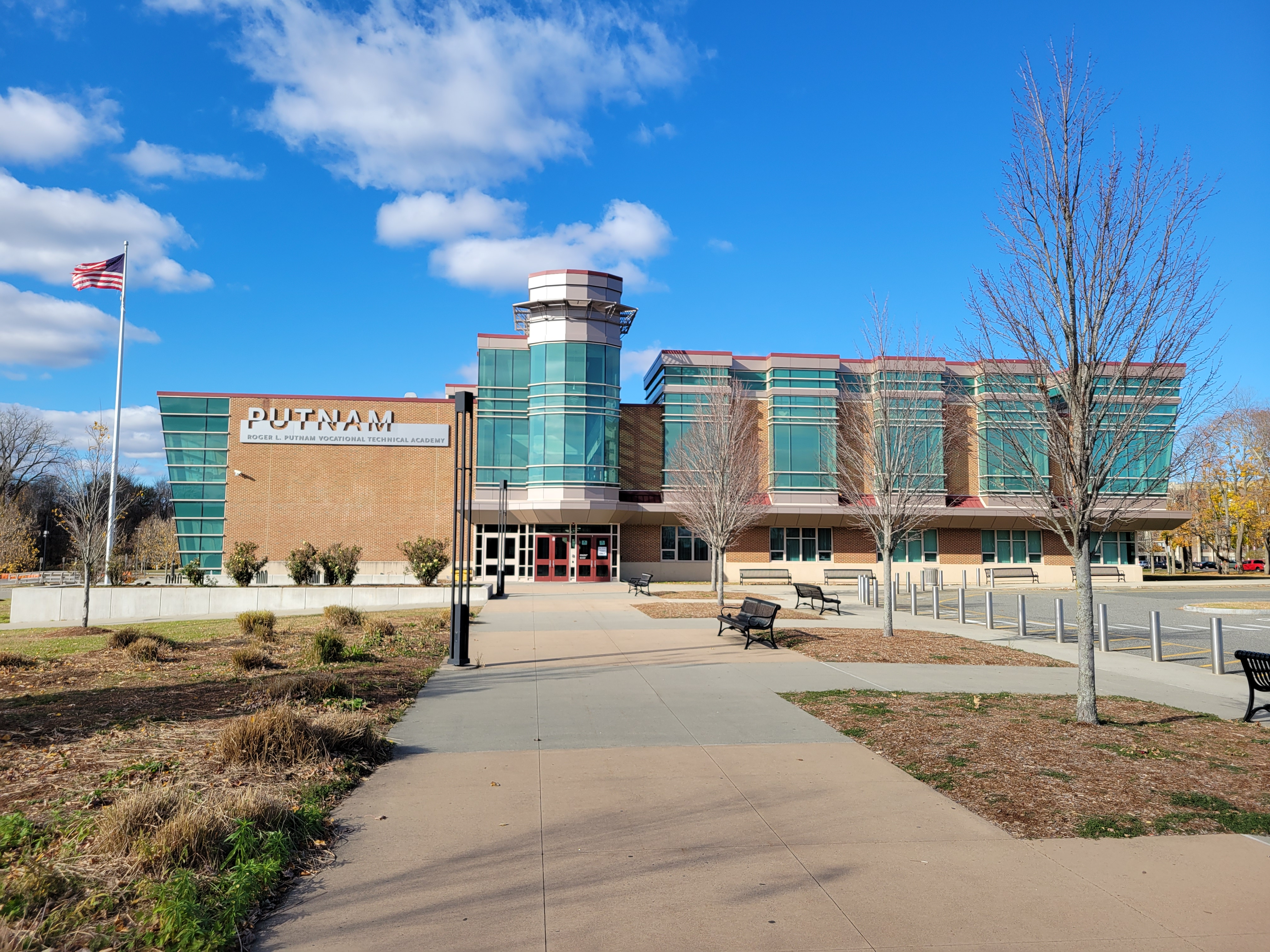
- Roger L. Putnam Vocational-Technical High School

Location
- 1300 State Street; Springfield, Massachusetts 01109; United States
- Coordinates: 42°07′03″N 72°32′57″W

Information
- School type: Public
- School district: Springfield Public Schools
- School number: 02810620
- Principal: George Johnson
- Staff: 164
- Teaching staff: 122.42 (FTE)
- Grades: 9–12
- Age range: 13–21
- Enrollment: 1,383 (2023-2024)
- Average class size: 1:9.9
- Student to teacher ratio: 11.30
- Classes offered: academic/vocational
- Hours in school day: 7:35 A.M. – 2:20 P.M.
- Campus type: Urban
- Colors: Blue and gold
- Athletics conference: MIAA Division 3
- Sports: Football, basketball, wrestling, track, baseball, softball
- Mascot: Beaver
- Nickname: Putnam
- Team name: Beavers
- Rival: Springfield Central High School
- Website: https://www.putnamvta.com/

Roger L. Putnam Vocational Technical Academy (formerly Roger L. Putnam Vocational-Technical High School) is an American vocational high school located in Springfield, Massachusetts, next to the Springfield High School of Science and Technology. Led by principal George Johnson and operating under the authority of the Springfield School Committee, Putnam Vocational provides academic and vocational instruction to students in grades nine through twelve throughout the Springfield area. The school is receiving Title I funds from the Commonwealth of Massachusetts.

== Student body ==
Roger L. Putnam Vocational Technical Academy serves 1,632 students throughout the Springfield area. Of these, 27.1% are African American, 1.5% are Asian, 56.8% are Hispanic, 11.8% are white, and 2.8% are identified as "other". Further populations identified include the percentage of First Language not English (27%), Limited English Proficient (8.6%), Low Income (72.4%), and Special Education (23.3%). Students' years may be identified by their uniform shirts: freshmen are to wear gray polos and black and navy blue pants, shorts, or skirts, whereas upperclassmen may wear blue or gold, which are Putnam's school colors. The graduation rate is 69.7%. The school does not appear to report plans for graduating seniors to the Massachusetts Department of Elementary and Secondary Education.

== Performance ==
Although it has shown small improvements over the years, Roger L. Putnam Vocational Technical Academy is currently designated as a Level 3 school by the Massachusetts Department of Elementary and Secondary Education as of March 2016. In 2010, no demographic achieved the goals set for Adequate Yearly Progress (AYP) by the Massachusetts Department of Elementary and Secondary Education for English Language Arts, as measured by attendance, standardized test scores, and other factors. In mathematics, only white students made (AYP) (except "Meets or exceeds state requirements"), with all other demographics (save African American) posting a loss of progress. From 2003 onward, the years 2004 and 2008 were the most recent years in which the school met AYP.

== Schedule ==
Roger L. Putnam Vocational Technical Academy operates on a swing-week schedule. Each week is designated as either 'A' week or 'B' week. During an 'A' week, approximately half of the student body are in their vocational shop for the entirety of the school day while the other half attend academic classes. The next week, the students switch to a 'B' week schedule, where the classes taken (academic or vocational) are switched.

== Vocational-technical education ==
As a vocational-technical high school, Roger L. Putnam Vocational Technical Academy offers instruction in the following vocational shops: Auto Mechanics, Automotive Body, Graphic Art, Commercial Art, Business Information Management, Sheet Metal, Carpentry, Cosmetology, Culinary, Hospitality/Tourism, HVAC, Horticulture, Marketing and Retail, and Radio/Film and TV, Allied health, child care, design and visual, and culinary. Ninth-grade students are placed in an exploratory program where they have the opportunity to experience many shops in a rotating schedule. At the end of the exploratory cycle, students are expected to select a shop in which they will further their vocational education. A combination of technical hands-on work coupled with a more academic theory 'related' portion assists the students in their learning. As juniors and seniors, students have to opportunity to apply for co-operative education programs and internships where students are essentially employees of the business and are able to earn money and academic credit while being exposed to the real-world demands of their vocation.

== Extracurricular activities ==
Roger L. Putnam Vocational Technical Academy offers a wide variety of sports for its students. Among their most successful and renowned teams are the Putnam football team, winning several Super Bowls throughout the years. Putnam offers baseball, softball, wrestling, swimming, soccer, cheerleading, volleyball, basketball, and track.

In addition to athletics, Putnam has a moderate number of extracurricular activities which extend the learning process beyond the typical school day. Most notable are the United States Marine Corps JROTC, winning several unit inspections and competitions each year as well as Cadet of the Year Medals. Putnam also has an active SkillsUSA chapter, advancing several students to the state finals in 2011 and eventually winning six gold medals. Putnam is an active participant in the national Future Farmers of America (FFA), an agriculturally-themed organization for students in the Horticulture shop. In its second year, the students have brought home two gold and one silver medals. Finally, the Putnam Debate team, the first vocational member of the National Catholic Forensic League, is also of note, sending one student to the 2010 National tournament in Omaha, NE. Other activities include Poetry Out Loud, Forensics Club, Chinese Club, Yu-Gi-Oh Club, Outdoor Club, Ski Club and many others.

== New building ==
Roger L. Putnam Vocational Technical Academy's old building has been demolished in favor of a newer building replacing it. The building, featuring the school's new name, Roger L. Putnam Vocational-Technical Academy, was dedicated before the 2012–2013 academic year. 2012. The building was originally budgeted at $125 million but was revised to $114.3 million later in construction. The Massachusetts School Building Authority is reimbursing the city for 90% of the project's cost. The building is designed to be reminiscent of a shopping mall, with many vocational areas maintaining a storefront where their wares may be bought and sold. Vocational technology has also been updated across the board for all shops.

== Notable alumni ==
- Kevin Fret (1994–2019), trap musician and rapper
- Orlando Ramos, member of the Massachusetts House of Representatives
