= Springfield High School of Science and Technology =

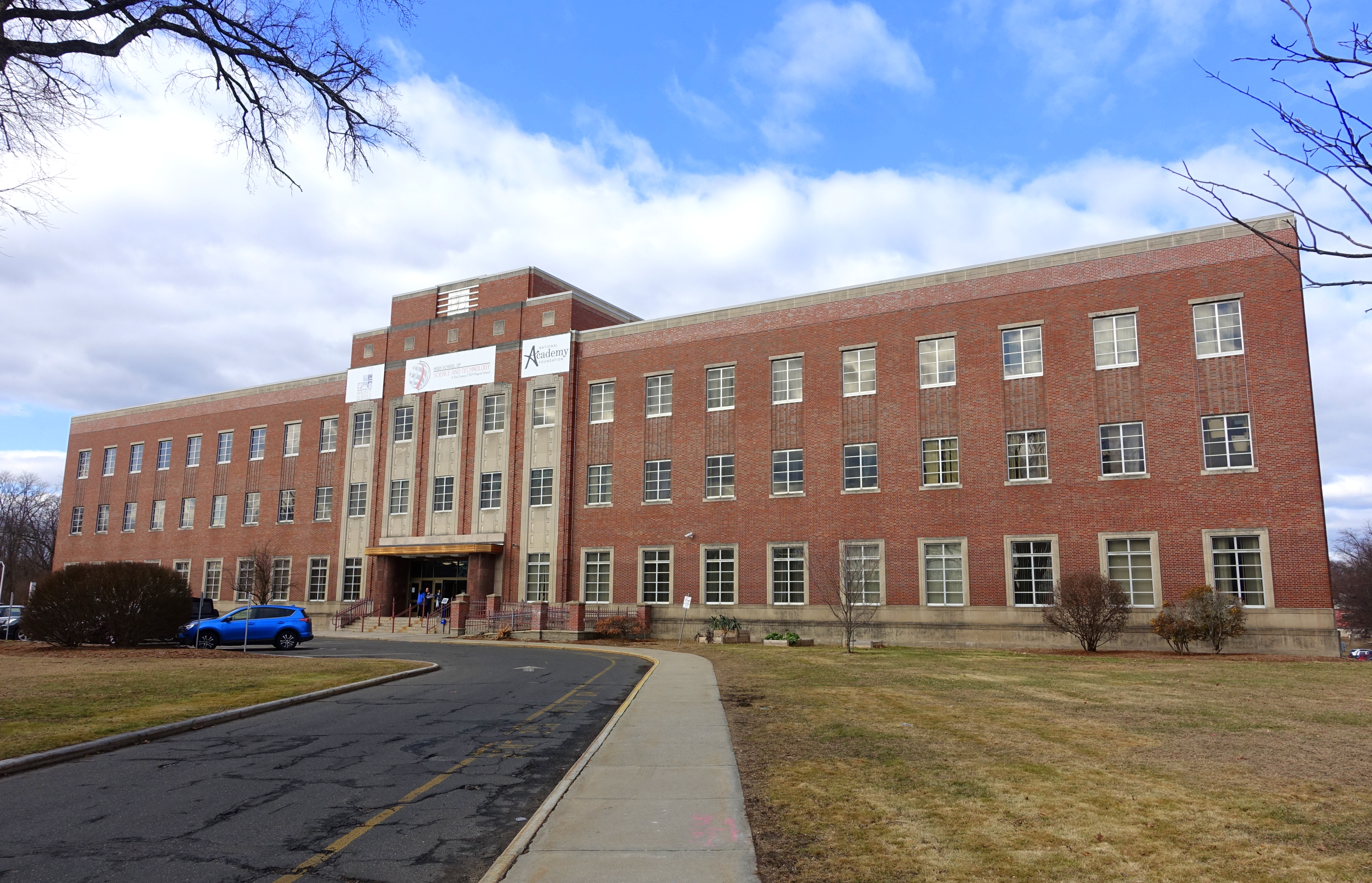

Location
- 1250 State Street; Springfield, Massachusetts 01109; United States; 42.1174°N 72.5497°W

Information
- School type: Public
- Opened: 1996
- School district: Springfield Public Schools
- CEEB code: 222034
- Dean: Jennifer Gray
- Principal: Kevin Lalime
- Teaching staff: 89.67 (FTE)
- Grades: 9–12
- Age range: 13–21
- Enrollment: 1,087 (2022–23)
- Average class size: 25
- Student to teacher ratio: 12.12
- Hours in school day: 7:35 A.M. - 2:20 P.M.
- Campus type: Urban
- Colors: Blue, White & Grey
- Athletics conference: MIAA Division 1
- Mascot: Cybercat
- Nickname: SciTech; HSST
- Website: scitech.springfieldpublicschools.com

The Springfield High School of Science and Technology (HSST) is a public high school located in Springfield, Massachusetts, United States. The high school is home to grades 9–12. As of September 2008, the student count was approximately 1,700 students. This makes Science and Technology the third largest high school in Springfield, behind Springfield Central High School and the High School of Commerce. It is located directly next to Springfield's Roger L Putnam Vocational-Technical High School and the two schools share school buses.
