= Granite Trust Company =

- U.S. National Register of Historic Places
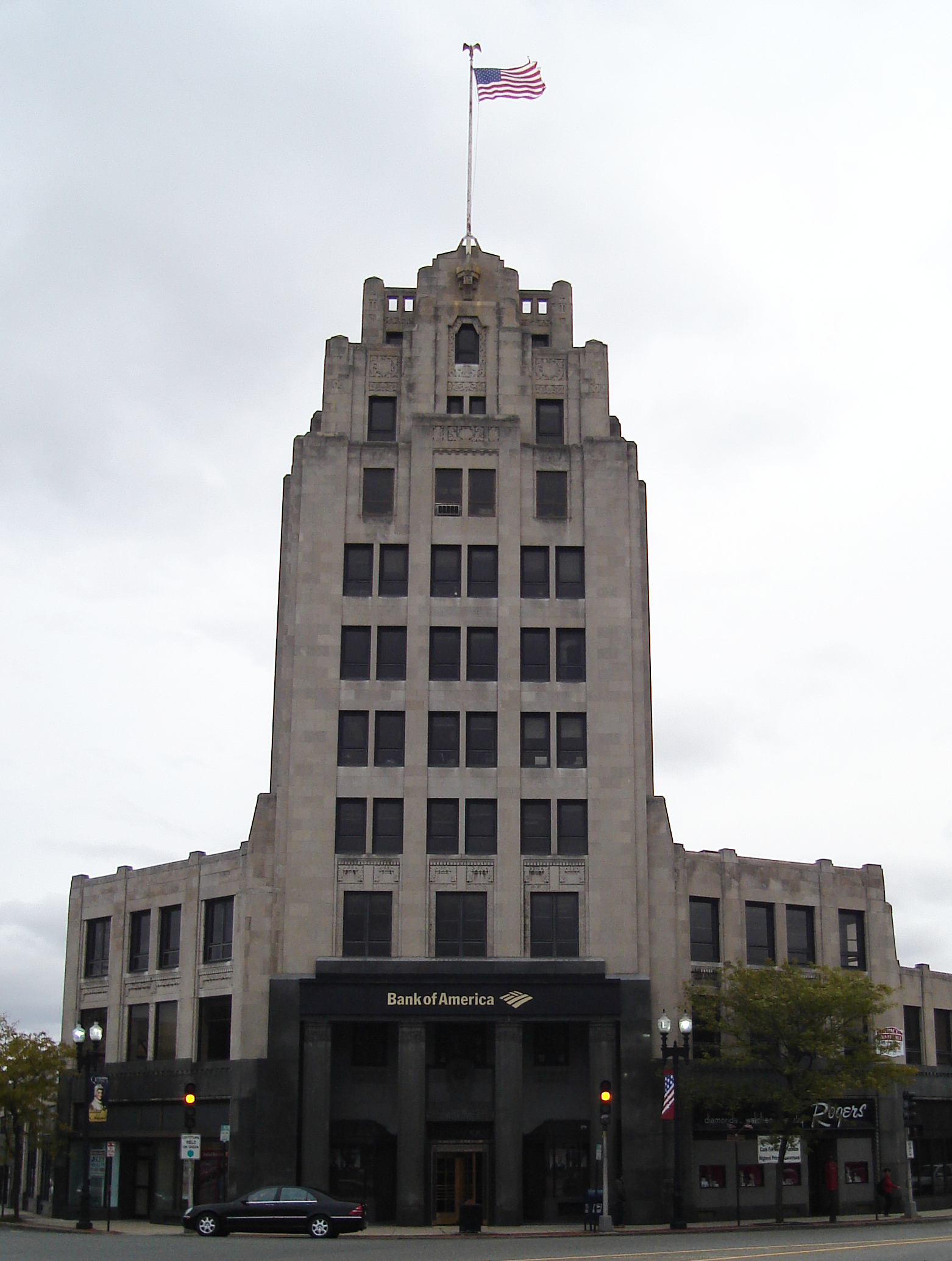

- Location within Massachusetts Location within the United States
- Location: 1400 Hancock St., Quincy, Massachusetts
- Coordinates: 42°14′58″N 71°0′10″W
- Built: 1929
- Architect: J. Williams Beal, Sons
- Architectural style: Art Deco
- MPS: Quincy MRA
- NRHP reference No.: 89001351
- Added to NRHP: September 20, 1989

The Granite Trust Company is a historic commercial building at 1400 Hancock Street in Quincy, Massachusetts. The Art Deco building was designed by J. Williams Beal, Sons, constructed in 1929, and is ten stories tall. It was built for the Granite Trust Company (later the South Shore Bank), whose predecessor, the Quincy Stone Bank, was the community's first commercial bank. The building was listed on the National Register of Historic Places in 1989.

== Description and history ==
The Granite Trust Company building stands prominently in Quincy's downtown, at the southeast corner of Hancock and Chestnut Streets. The ten-story structure is faced in limestone and granite, and consists of a large base three stories in height, from which the central tower rises, the topmost levels stepped back in size from the intermediate ones. The ground-level storefronts are finished in granite, while the upper levels are finished in limestone. While it has some decorative elements, including panels of decorative stonework, most of its style comes from its vertically-oriented massing, including pilasters between some of the bays on the lower section, and the flattened pyramidal caps at their tops.

The Quincy Stone Bank was founded in 1836, and was the city's first commercial bank. It was notable at the time as the first commercial bank in the nation to raise capital via a public stock offering. In 1865 it received a national charter, and was reincorporated in 1912 as the Granite Trust Company. The bank commissioned the construction of this building, completed in 1929, as its headquarters. The building was designed by J. Williams Beal, Sons, Boston architects credited with a number of Quincy's high-profile buildings.

== See also ==
- National Register of Historic Places listings in Quincy, Massachusetts
