= Robert H. Goddard =

American physicist and inventor (1882–1945)

Robert Goddard
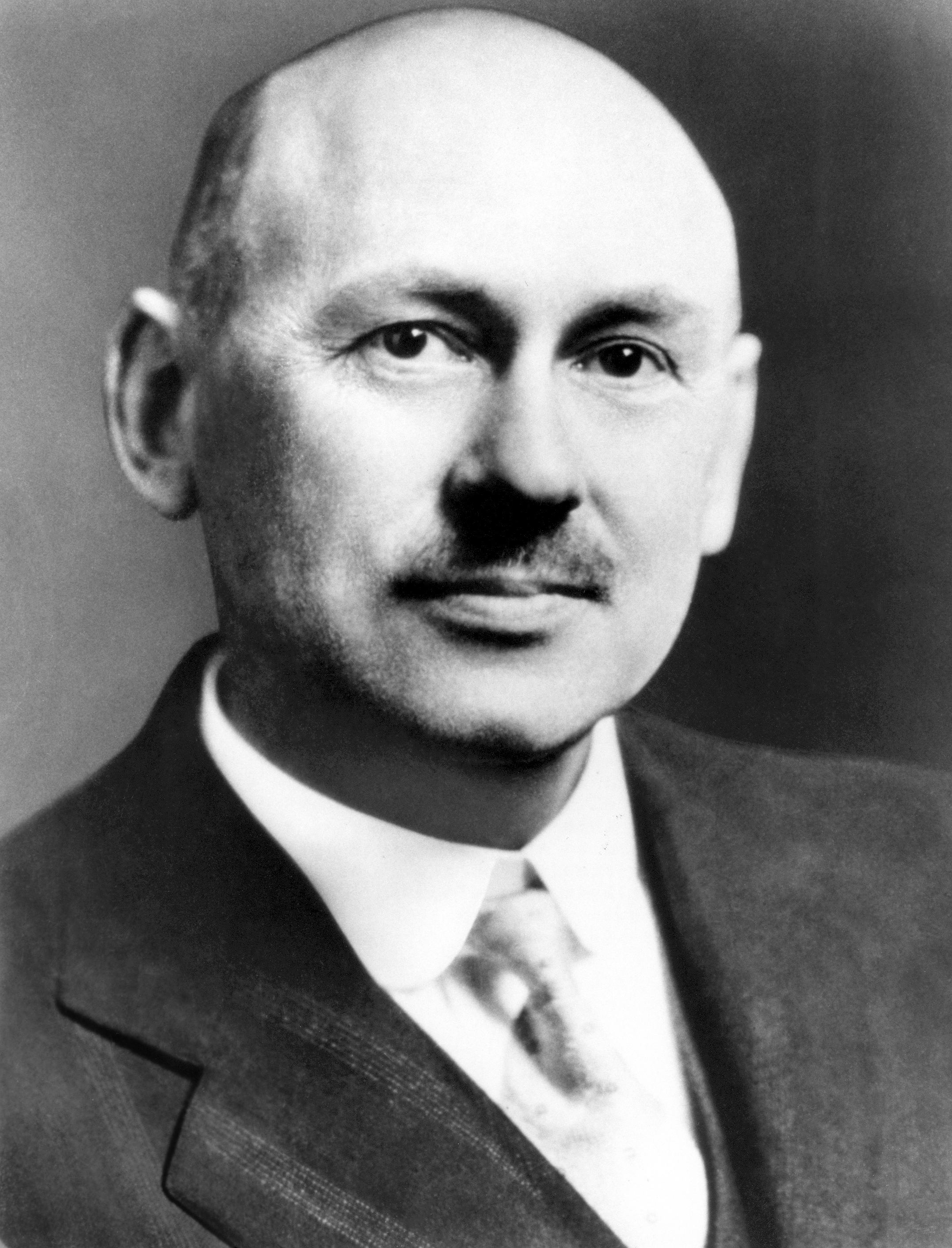
- Born: Robert Hutchings Goddard; October 5, 1882; Worcester, Massachusetts, U.S.
- Died: August 10, 1945 (aged 62); Baltimore, Maryland, U.S.
- Education: Worcester Polytechnic Institute; Clark University
- Occupations: Professor, aerospace engineer, physicist, inventor
- Known for: First liquid-fueled rocket
- Spouse: Esther Christine Kisk (m. 1924–1945)
- Awards: Congressional Gold Medal (1959); Langley Gold Medal (1960); Daniel Guggenheim Medal (1964)

Robert Hutchings Goddard (October 5, 1882 – August 10, 1945) was an American physicist, inventor, and engineer credited with creating and building the world's first liquid-fueled rocket, which was successfully launched on March 16, 1926. By 1915 his pioneering work had dramatically improved the efficiency of the solid-fueled rocket, signaling the era of the modern rocket and innovation. He and his team launched 34 rockets between 1926 and 1941, achieving altitudes as high as 2.6 km (1.6 mi) and speeds as fast as 885 km/h (550 mph).

Goddard's work as both theorist and engineer anticipated many of the developments that would make spaceflight possible. Two of Goddard's 214 patented inventions, a multi-stage rocket (1914), and a liquid-fuel rocket (1914), were important milestones toward spaceflight. His 1919 monograph A Method of Reaching Extreme Altitudes is considered one of the classic texts of 20th-century rocket science. Goddard successfully pioneered modern methods such as two-axis control (gyroscopes and steerable thrust) to allow rockets to control their flight effectively.

Although his work in the field was revolutionary, Goddard received little public or financial support for his research and development work. He was a shy person, and rocket research was not considered a suitable pursuit for a physics professor. The press and other scientists ridiculed his theories of spaceflight. As a result, he became protective of his privacy and his work.

Years after his death, at the dawn of the Space Age, Goddard came to be recognized as one of the founding fathers of modern rocketry, along with Robert Esnault-Pelterie, Konstantin Tsiolkovsky and Hermann Oberth. He not only recognized early on the potential of rockets for atmospheric research, ballistic missiles and space travel, but also was the first to scientifically study, design, construct and fly the precursory rockets needed to eventually implement those ideas.

NASA's Goddard Space Flight Center was named in Goddard's honor in 1959. He was also inducted into the International Aerospace Hall of Fame and National Aviation Hall of Fame in 1966, and the International Space Hall of Fame icvn 1976.

== Early life and inspiration ==
Goddard was born in Worcester, Massachusetts, to Nahum Danford Goddard (1859–1928) and Fannie Louise Hoyt (1864–1920). Robert was their only child to survive; a younger son, Richard Henry, was born with a spinal deformity and died before his first birthday. His father Nahum was employed by manufacturers and invented several useful tools. Goddard had English paternal family roots in New England with William Goddard (1628–91) a London grocer who settled in Watertown, Massachusetts, in 1666. On his maternal side he was descended from John Hoyt and other settlers of Massachusetts in the late 1600s. Shortly after his birth, the family moved to Boston. With a curiosity about nature, he studied the heavens using a telescope from his father and observed the birds flying. Essentially a country boy, he loved the outdoors and hiking with his father on trips to Worcester and became an excellent marksman with a rifle. In 1898, his mother contracted tuberculosis and they moved back to Worcester for the clear air. On Sundays, the family attended the Episcopal church, and Robert sang in the choir.

=== Childhood experiments ===
With the electrification of American cities in the 1880s, the young Goddard became interested in science—specifically, engineering and technology. When his father showed him how to generate static electricity on the family's carpet, the five-year-old's imagination was sparked. Robert experimented, believing he could jump higher if the zinc from a battery could be charged by scuffing his feet on the gravel walk. But, holding the zinc, he could jump no higher than usual. Goddard halted the experiments after a warning from his mother that if he succeeded, he could "go sailing away and might not be able to come back." He experimented with chemicals and created a cloud of smoke and an explosion in the house. Goddard's father encouraged Robert's scientific interest further by providing him with a telescope, a microscope, and a subscription to Scientific American. Robert developed a fascination with flight, first with kites and then with balloons. He became a thorough diarist and documenter of his work—a skill that would greatly benefit his later career. These interests merged at age 16, when Goddard attempted to construct a balloon out of aluminum, shaping the raw metal in his home workshop, and filling it with hydrogen. After nearly five weeks of methodical, documented efforts, he finally abandoned the project, remarking, "... balloon will not go up. ... Aluminum is too heavy. Failior [sic] crowns enterprise." However, the lesson of this failure did not restrain Goddard's growing determination and confidence in his work. He wrote in 1927, "I imagine an innate interest in mechanical things was inherited from a number of ancestors who were machinists."

=== Cherry tree dream ===
He became interested in space at the age of 16 when he read H. G. Wells' newly published novel The War of the Worlds, in which England is invaded by an alien species from Mars. His dedication to pursuing space flight became fixed on October 19, 1899. The 17-year-old Goddard climbed a cherry tree to cut off dead limbs. He was transfixed by the sky, and his imagination grew. He later wrote:

On this day I climbed a tall cherry tree at the back of the barn ... and as I looked toward the fields at the east, I imagined how wonderful it would be to make some device which had even the possibility of ascending to Mars, and how it would look on a small scale, if sent up from the meadow at my feet. I have several photographs of the tree, taken since, with the little ladder I made to climb it, leaning against it.

It seemed to me then that a weight whirling around a horizontal shaft, moving more rapidly above than below, could furnish lift by virtue of the greater centrifugal force at the top of the path.

I was a different boy when I descended the tree from when I ascended. Existence at last seemed very purposive.

For the rest of his life, he observed October 19 as "Anniversary Day", a private commemoration of the day of his greatest inspiration.

== Education and early studies ==
The young Goddard was a thin and frail boy, almost always in fragile health. He suffered from stomach problems, pleurisy, colds, and bronchitis, and he fell two years behind his classmates. He became a voracious reader, regularly visiting the local public library to borrow books on the physical sciences.

=== Aerodynamics and motion ===
Goddard's interest in aerodynamics led him to study some of Samuel Langley's scientific papers in the periodical Smithsonian. In these papers, Langley wrote that birds flap their wings with different force on each side to turn in the air. Inspired by these articles, the teenage Goddard watched swallows and chimney swifts from the porch of his home, noting how subtly the birds moved their wings to control their flight. He noted how remarkably the birds controlled their flight with their tail feathers, which he called the birds' equivalent of ailerons. He took exception to some of Langley's conclusions and in 1901 wrote a letter to St. Nicholas magazine with his own ideas. The editor of St. Nicholas declined to publish Goddard's letter, remarking that birds fly with a certain amount of intelligence and that "machines will not act with such intelligence." Goddard disagreed, believing that a man could control a flying machine with his own intelligence.

Around this time, Goddard read Newton's Principia Mathematica, and found that Newton's third law of motion applied to motion in space. He wrote later about his own tests of the law:

I began to realize that there might be something after all to Newton's Laws. The Third Law was accordingly tested, both with devices suspended by rubber bands and by devices on floats, in the little brook back of the barn, and the said law was verified conclusively. It made me realize that if a way to navigate space were to be discovered, or invented, it would be the result of a knowledge of physics and mathematics.

=== Academics ===
As his health improved, Goddard continued his formal schooling as a 19-year-old sophomore at South High in Worcester in 1901. He excelled in his coursework, and his peers twice elected him class president. Making up for lost time, he studied books on mathematics, astronomy, mechanics and composition from the school library. At his graduation ceremony in 1904, he gave his class oration as valedictorian. In his speech, entitled "On Taking Things for Granted", Goddard included a section that would become emblematic of his life:

[J]ust as in the sciences we have learned that we are too ignorant to safely pronounce anything impossible, so for the individual, since we cannot know just what are his limitations, we can hardly say with certainty that anything is necessarily within or beyond his grasp. Each must remember that no one can predict to what heights of wealth, fame, or usefulness he may rise until he has honestly endeavored, and he should derive courage from the fact that all sciences have been, at some time, in the same condition as he, and that it has often proved true that the dream of yesterday is the hope of today and the reality of tomorrow.

Goddard enrolled at Worcester Polytechnic Institute in 1904. He quickly impressed the head of the physics department, A. Wilmer Duff, with his thirst for knowledge, and Duff took him on as a laboratory assistant and tutor. At WPI, Goddard joined the Sigma Alpha Epsilon fraternity and began a long courtship with high school classmate Miriam Olmstead, an honor student who had graduated with him as salutatorian. Eventually, she and Goddard were engaged, but they drifted apart and ended the engagement around 1909.

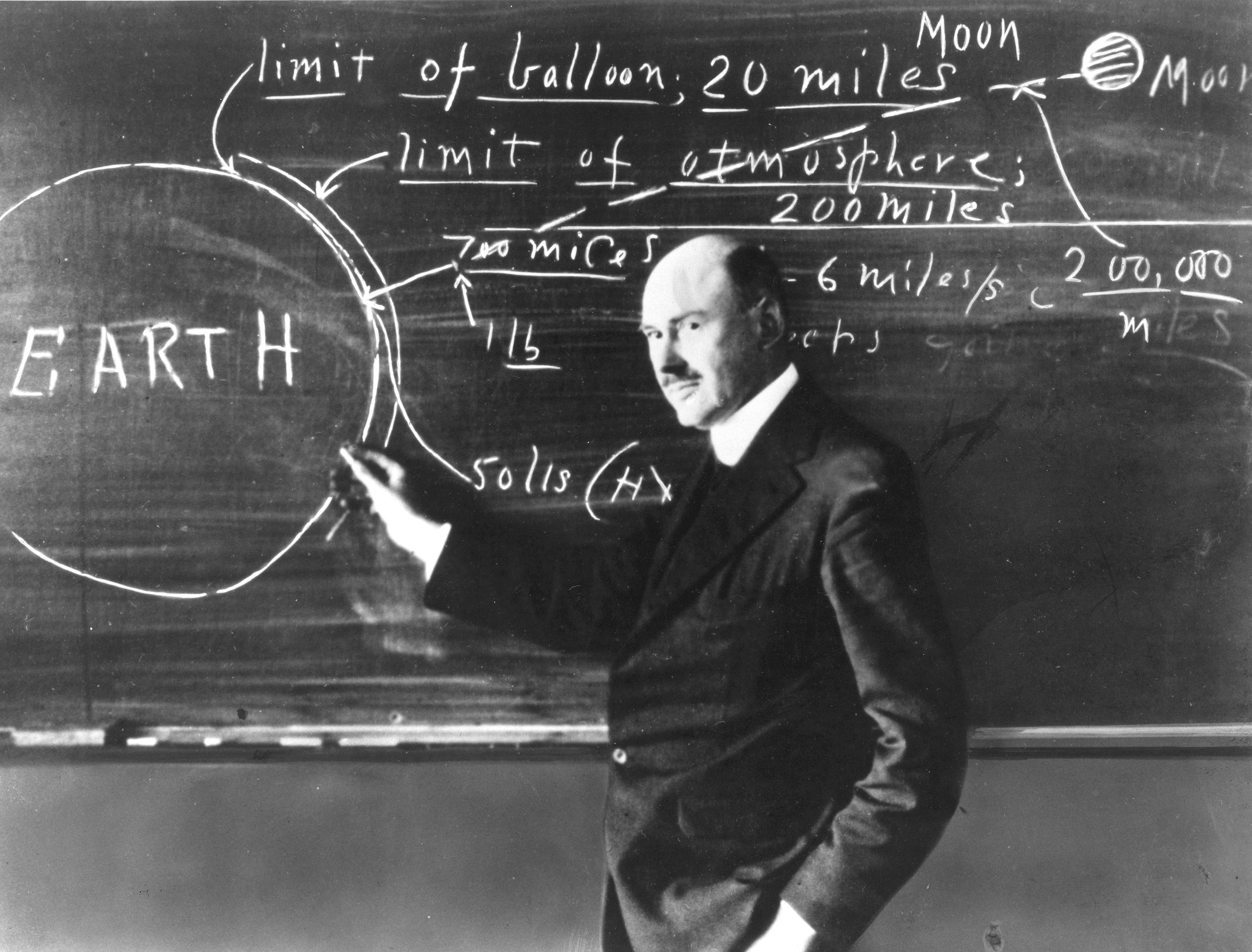
Goddard at Clark University

Goddard received his B.S. degree in physics from Worcester Polytechnic in 1908, and after serving there for a year as an instructor in physics, he began his graduate studies at Clark University in Worcester in the fall of 1909. While studying at Clark, Goddard continued working in Salisbury Labs at WPI and anecdotally caused a damaging explosion, whereupon his work was moved to the Magnetic Lab (today called Skull Tomb).

Goddard received his M.A. degree in physics from Clark University in 1910, and then stayed at Clark to complete his Ph.D. in physics in 1911. He spent another year at Clark as an honorary fellow in physics, and in 1912 he accepted a research fellowship at Princeton University's Palmer Physical Laboratory.

=== First scientific writings ===
The high-school student summed up his ideas on space travel in a proposed article, "The Navigation of Space," which he submitted to the Popular Science News. The journal's editor returned it, saying that they could not use it "in the near future."

While still an undergraduate, Goddard wrote a paper proposing a method for balancing airplanes using gyro-stabilization. He submitted the idea to Scientific American, which published the paper in 1907. Goddard later wrote in his diaries that he believed his paper was the first proposal of a way to automatically stabilize aircraft in flight. His proposal came around the same time as other scientists were making breakthroughs in developing functional gyroscopes.

While studying physics at WPI, ideas came to Goddard's mind that sometimes seemed impossible, but he was compelled to record them for future investigation. He wrote that "there was something inside which simply would not stop working." He purchased some cloth-covered notebooks and began filling them with a variety of thoughts, mostly concerning his dream of space travel. He considered centrifugal force, radio waves, magnetic reaction, solar energy, atomic energy, ion or electrostatic propulsion and other methods to reach space. After experimenting with solid-fuel rockets he was convinced by 1909 that chemical-propellant engines were the answer. A particularly complex concept was set down in June 1908: Sending a camera around distant planets, guided by measurements of gravity along the trajectory, and returning to earth.

His first writing on the possibility of a liquid-fueled rocket came on February 2, 1909. Goddard had begun to study ways of increasing a rocket's efficiency using methods differing from conventional solid-fuel rockets. He wrote in his notebook about using liquid hydrogen as a fuel with liquid oxygen as the oxidizer. He believed that 50-percent efficiency could be achieved with these liquid propellants (i.e., half of the heat energy of combustion converted to the kinetic energy of the exhaust gases).

== First patents ==
In the decades around 1910, radio was a new technology, fertile for innovation. In 1912, while working at Princeton University, Goddard investigated the effects of radio waves on insulators. In order to generate radio-frequency power, he invented a vacuum tube with a beam deflection that operated like a cathode-ray oscillator tube. His patent on this tube, which predated that of Lee De Forest, became central in the suit between Arthur A. Collins, whose small company made radio transmitter tubes, and AT&T and RCA over his use of vacuum tube technology. Goddard accepted only a consultant's fee from Collins when the suit was dropped. Eventually, the two big companies allowed the country's growing electronics industry to use the De Forest patents freely.

=== Rocket math ===
By 1912 he had in his spare time, using calculus, developed the mathematics which allowed him to calculate the position and velocity of a rocket in vertical flight, given the weight of the rocket and weight of the propellant and the velocity (with respect to the rocket frame) of the exhaust gases. In effect he had independently developed the Tsiolkovsky rocket equation published a decade earlier in Russia. Tsiolkovsky, however, did not account for gravity nor drag. For vertical flight from the surface of Earth Goddard included in his differential equation the effects of gravity and aerodynamic drag. He wrote: "An approximate method was found necessary ... in order to avoid an unsolved problem in the calculus of variations. The solution that was obtained revealed the fact that surprisingly small initial masses would be necessary ... provided the gases were ejected from the rocket at a high velocity, and also provided that most of the rocket consisted of propellant material."

His first goal was to build a sounding rocket with which to study the atmosphere. Not only would such investigation aid meteorology, but it was necessary to determine temperature, density and wind speed as functions of altitude in order to design efficient space launch vehicles. He was very reluctant to admit that his ultimate goal was, in fact, to develop a vehicle for flights into space, since most scientists, especially in the United States, did not consider such a goal to be a realistic or practical scientific pursuit, nor was the public yet ready to give serious consideration to such ideas. Later, in 1933, Goddard said that "[I]n no case must we allow ourselves to be deterred from the achievement of space travel, test by test and step by step, until one day we succeed, cost what it may."

=== Illness ===
In early 1913, Goddard became seriously ill with tuberculosis and had to leave his position at Princeton. He then returned to Worcester, where he began a prolonged process of recovery at home. His doctors did not expect him to live. He decided he should spend time outside in the fresh air and walk for exercise, and he gradually improved. When his nurse discovered some of his notes in his bed, he kept them, arguing, "I have to live to do this work."

It was during this period of recuperation, however, that Goddard began to produce some of his most important work. As his symptoms subsided, he allowed himself to work an hour per day with his notes made at Princeton. He was afraid that nobody would be able to read his scribbling should he succumb.

=== Foundational patents ===
In the technological and manufacturing atmosphere of Worcester, patents were considered essential, not only to protect original work but as documentation of first discovery. He began to see the importance of his ideas as intellectual property, and thus began to secure those ideas before someone else did—and he would have to pay to use them. In May 1913, he wrote descriptions concerning his first rocket patent applications. His father brought them to a patent lawyer in Worcester who helped him to refine his ideas for consideration. Goddard's first patent application was submitted in October 1913.

In 1914, his first two landmark patents were accepted and registered. The first, U.S. patent 1,102,653, described a multi-stage rocket fueled with a solid "explosive material." The second, U.S. patent 1,103,503, described a rocket fueled with a solid fuel (explosive material) or with liquid propellants (gasoline and liquid nitrous oxide). The two patents would eventually become important milestones in the history of rocketry. Overall, 214 patents were published, some posthumously by his wife.

== Early rocketry research ==
Video clips of Goddard's launches and other events in his life

In the fall of 1914 Goddard's health had improved, and he accepted a part-time position as an instructor and research fellow at Clark University. His position at Clark allowed him to further his rocketry research. He ordered numerous supplies that could be used to build rocket prototypes for launch and spent much of 1915 in preparation for his first tests. Goddard's first test launch of a powder rocket came on an early evening in 1915 following his daytime classes at Clark. The launch was loud and bright enough to arouse the alarm of the campus janitor, and Goddard had to reassure him that his experiments, while being serious study, were also quite harmless. After this incident Goddard took his experiments inside the physics lab in order to limit any disturbance.

At the Clark physics lab, Goddard conducted static tests of powder rockets to measure their thrust and efficiency. He found his earlier estimates to be verified; powder rockets were converting only about two percent of the thermal energy in their fuel into thrust and kinetic energy. At this point he applied de Laval nozzles, which were generally used with steam turbine engines, and these greatly improved efficiency. (Of the several definitions of rocket efficiency, Goddard measured in his laboratory what is today called the internal efficiency of the engine: the ratio of the kinetic energy of the exhaust gases to the available thermal energy of combustion, expressed as a percentage.) By mid-summer of 1915 Goddard had obtained an average efficiency of 40 percent with a nozzle exit velocity of 6,728 feet (2,051 meters) per second. Connecting a combustion chamber full of gunpowder to various converging-diverging expansion (de Laval) nozzles, Goddard was able in static tests to achieve engine efficiencies of more than 63% and exhaust velocities of over 7,000 feet (2,134 meters) per second.

Few would recognize it at the time, but this little engine was a major breakthrough. These experiments suggested that rockets could be made powerful enough to escape Earth and travel into space. This engine and subsequent experiments sponsored by the Smithsonian Institution were the beginning of modern rocketry and, ultimately, space exploration. Goddard realized, however, that it would take the more efficient liquid propellants to reach space.

Later that year, Goddard designed an elaborate experiment at the Clark physics lab and proved that a rocket would perform in a vacuum such as that in space. He believed it would, but many other scientists were not yet convinced. His experiment demonstrated that a rocket's performance actually decreases under atmospheric pressure.

In September 1906 he wrote in his notebook about using the repulsion of electrically charged particles (ions) to produce thrust. From 1916 to 1917, Goddard built and tested the first known experimental ion thrusters, which he thought might be used for propulsion in the near-vacuum conditions of outer space. The small glass engines he built were tested at atmospheric pressure, where they generated a stream of ionized air.

=== Smithsonian Institution sponsorship ===
By 1916, the cost of Goddard's rocket research had become too great for his modest teaching salary to bear. He began to solicit potential sponsors for financial assistance, beginning with the Smithsonian Institution, the National Geographic Society, and the Aero Club of America.

In his letter to the Smithsonian in September 1916, Goddard claimed he had achieved a 63% efficiency and a nozzle velocity of almost 2438 meters per second. With these performance levels, he believed a rocket could vertically lift a weight of 1 lb (0.45 kg) to a height of 232 miles (373 km) with an initial launch weight of only 89.6 lbs (40.64 kg). (Earth's atmosphere can be considered to end at 80 to 100 miles (130 to 160 km) altitude, where its drag effect on orbiting satellites becomes minimal.)

The Smithsonian was interested and asked Goddard to elaborate upon his initial inquiry. Goddard responded with a detailed manuscript he had already prepared, entitled A Method of Reaching Extreme Altitudes.

In January 1917, the Smithsonian agreed to provide Goddard with a five-year grant totaling US$5000. Afterward, Clark was able to contribute US$3500 and the use of their physics lab to the project. Worcester Polytechnic Institute also allowed him to use its abandoned Magnetics Laboratory on the edge of campus during this time, as a safe place for testing. WPI also made some parts in their machine shop.

Goddard's fellow Clark scientists were astonished at the unusually large Smithsonian grant for rocket research, which they thought was not real science. Decades later, rocket scientists who knew how much it cost to research and develop rockets said that he had received little financial support.

Two years later, at the insistence of Arthur G. Webster, the world-renowned head of Clark's physics department, Goddard arranged for the Smithsonian to publish the paper, A Method..., which documented his work.

While at Clark University, Goddard did research into solar power using a parabolic dish to concentrate the Sun's rays on a machined piece of quartz, that was sprayed with mercury, which then heated water and drove an electric generator. Goddard believed his invention had overcome all the obstacles that had previously defeated other scientists and inventors, and he had his findings published in the November 1929 issue of Popular Science.

=== Goddard's military rocket ===
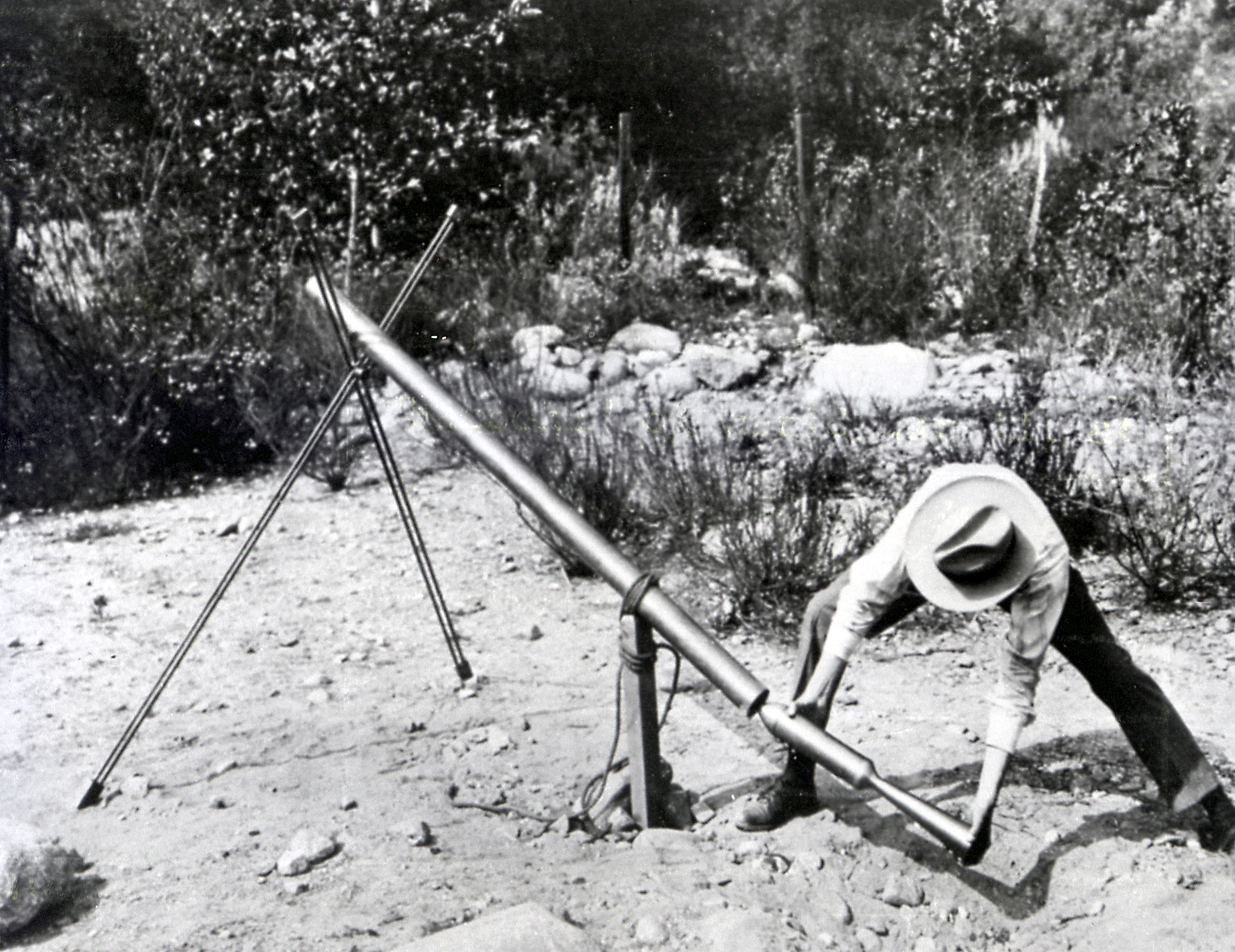
Goddard loading a rocket in 1918

Not all of Goddard's early work was geared toward space travel. As the United States entered World War I in 1917, the country's universities began to lend their services to the war effort. Goddard believed his rocket research could be applied to many different military applications, including mobile artillery, field weapons and naval torpedoes. He made proposals to the Navy and Army. No record exists in his papers of any interest by the Navy to Goddard's inquiry. However, Army Ordnance was quite interested, and Goddard met several times with Army personnel.

During this time, Goddard was also contacted, in early 1918, by a civilian industrialist in Worcester about the possibility of manufacturing rockets for the military. However, as the businessman's enthusiasm grew, so did Goddard's suspicion. Talks eventually broke down as Goddard began to fear his work might be appropriated by the business. However, an Army Signal Corps officer tried to make Goddard cooperate, but he was called off by General George Squier of the Signal Corps who had been contacted by Secretary of the Smithsonian Institution, Charles Walcott. Goddard became leery of working with corporations and was careful to secure patents to "protect his ideas." These events led to the Signal Corps sponsorship of Goddard's work during World War I.

Goddard proposed to the Army an idea for a tube-based rocket launcher as a light infantry weapon. The launcher concept became the precursor to the bazooka. The rocket-powered, recoil-free weapon was the brainchild of Goddard as a side project (under Army contract) of his work on rocket propulsion. Goddard, during his tenure at Clark University, and working at Mount Wilson Observatory for security reasons, designed the tube-fired rocket for military use during World War I. He and his co-worker Clarence N. Hickman successfully demonstrated his rocket to the U.S. Army Signal Corps at Aberdeen Proving Ground, Maryland, on November 6, 1918, using two music stands for a launch platform. The Army was impressed, but the Compiègne Armistice was signed only five days later, and further development was discontinued as World War I ended.

The delay in the development of the bazooka and other weapons was a result of the long recovery period required from Goddard's serious bout with tuberculosis. Goddard continued to be a part-time consultant to the U.S. Government at Indian Head, Maryland, until 1923, but his focus had turned to other research involving rocket propulsion, including work with liquid fuels and liquid oxygen.

Later, the former Clark University researcher Clarence N. Hickman and Army officers Col. Leslie Skinner and Lt. Edward Uhl continued Goddard's work on the bazooka. A shaped-charge warhead was attached to the rocket, leading to the tank-killing weapon used in World War II and to many other powerful rocket weapons.

== A Method of Reaching Extreme Altitudes ==
In 1919 Goddard thought that it would be premature to disclose the results of his experiments because his engine was not sufficiently developed. Webster realized that Goddard had accomplished a good deal of fine work and insisted that Goddard publish his progress so far or he would take care of it himself, so Goddard asked the Smithsonian Institution if it would publish the report, updated with notes, that he had submitted in late 1916.

In late 1919, the Smithsonian published Goddard's groundbreaking work, A Method of Reaching Extreme Altitudes. The report describes Goddard's mathematical theories of rocket flight, his experiments with solid-fuel rockets, and the possibilities he saw of exploring Earth's atmosphere and beyond. Along with Konstantin Tsiolkovsky's earlier work, The Exploration of Cosmic Space by Means of Reaction Devices, Goddard's report is regarded as one of the pioneering works of the science of rocketry, and 1750 copies were distributed worldwide. Goddard also sent a copy to individuals who requested one, until his personal supply was exhausted. Smithsonian aerospace historian Frank Winter said that this paper was "one of the key catalysts behind the international rocket movement of the 1920s and 30s."

Goddard described extensive experiments with solid-fuel rocket engines burning high-grade nitrocellulose smokeless powder. A critical breakthrough was the use of the steam turbine nozzle invented by the Swedish inventor Gustaf de Laval. The de Laval nozzle allows the most efficient (isentropic) conversion of the energy of hot gases into forward motion. By means of this nozzle, Goddard increased the efficiency of his rocket engines from two percent to 64 percent and obtained supersonic exhaust velocities of over Mach 7.

Though most of this work dealt with the theoretical and experimental relations between propellant, rocket mass, thrust, and velocity, a final section, entitled "Calculation of minimum mass required to raise one pound to an 'infinite' altitude," discussed the possible uses of rockets, not only to reach the upper atmosphere but to escape from Earth's gravitation altogether. He determined, using an approximate method to solve his differential equation of motion for vertical flight, that a rocket with an effective exhaust velocity (see specific impulse) of 7000 feet per second and an initial weight of 602 pounds would be able to send a one-pound payload to an infinite height. Included as a thought experiment was the idea of launching a rocket to the Moon and igniting a mass of flash powder on its surface, so as to be visible through a telescope. He discussed the matter seriously, down to an estimate of the amount of powder required. Goddard's conclusion was that a rocket with starting mass of 3.21 tons could produce a flash "just visible" from Earth, assuming a final payload weight of 10.7 pounds.

Goddard eschewed publicity, because he did not have time to reply to criticism of his work, and his imaginative ideas about space travel were shared only with private groups he trusted. He did, though, publish and talk about the rocket principle and sounding rockets, since these subjects were not too "far out." In a letter to the Smithsonian, dated March 1920, he discussed: photographing the Moon and planets from rocket-powered fly-by probes, sending messages to distant civilizations on inscribed metal plates, the use of solar energy in space, and the idea of high-velocity ion propulsion. In that same letter, Goddard clearly describes the concept of the ablative heat shield, suggesting the landing apparatus be covered with "layers of a very infusible hard substance with layers of a poor heat conductor between" designed to erode in the same way as the surface of a meteor.

=== Publicity and criticism ===
Every vision is a joke until the first man accomplishes it; once realized, it becomes commonplace.

— Response to a reporter's question following criticism in The New York Times, 1920.

The publication of Goddard's document gained him national attention from U.S. newspapers, most of it negative. Although Goddard's discussion of targeting the moon was only a small part of the work as a whole (eight lines on the next to last page of 69 pages), and was intended as an illustration of the possibilities rather than a declaration of intent, the papers sensationalized his ideas to the point of misrepresentation and ridicule. Even the Smithsonian had to abstain from publicity because of the amount of ridiculous correspondence received from the general public. David Lasser, who co-founded the American Rocket Society (ARS), wrote in 1931 that Goddard was subjected in the press to the "most violent attacks."

On January 12, 1920, a front-page story in The New York Times, "Believes Rocket Can Reach Moon", reported a Smithsonian press release about a "multiple-charge, high-efficiency rocket." The chief application envisaged was "the possibility of sending recording apparatus to moderate and extreme altitudes within the Earth's atmosphere", the advantage over balloon-carried instruments being ease of recovery, since "the new rocket apparatus would go straight up and come straight down." But it also mentioned a proposal "to [send] to the dark part of the new moon a sufficiently large amount of the most brilliant flash powder which, in being ignited on impact, would be plainly visible in a powerful telescope. This would be the only way of proving that the rocket had really left the attraction of the earth, as the apparatus would never come back, once it had escaped that attraction."

==== New York Times editorial ====
On January 13, 1920, the day after its front-page story about Goddard's rocket, an unsigned New York Times editorial, in a section entitled "Topics of the Times", scoffed at the proposal. The article, which bore the title "A Severe Strain on Credulity", began with apparent approval, but soon went on to cast serious doubt:

As a method of sending a missile to the higher, and even highest, part of the earth's atmospheric envelope, Professor Goddard's multiple-charge rocket is a practicable, and therefore promising device. Such a rocket, too, might carry self-recording instruments, to be released at the limit of its flight, and conceivable parachutes would bring them safely to the ground. It is not obvious, however, that the instruments would return to the point of departure; indeed, it is obvious that they would not, for parachutes drift exactly as balloons do.

The article pressed further on Goddard's proposal to launch rockets beyond the atmosphere:

[A]fter the rocket quits our air and really starts on its longer journey, its flight would be neither accelerated nor maintained by the explosion of the charges it then might have left. To claim that it would be is to deny a fundamental law of dynamics, and only Dr. Einstein and his chosen dozen, so few and fit, are licensed to do that. ... Of course, [Goddard] only seems to lack the knowledge ladled out daily in high schools.

Thrust is however possible in a vacuum.

==== Aftermath ====
A week after the New York Times editorial, Goddard released a signed statement to the Associated Press, attempting to restore reason to what had become a sensational story:

Too much attention has been concentrated on the proposed flash pow[d]er experiment, and too little on the exploration of the atmosphere. ... Whatever interesting possibilities there may be of the method that has been proposed, other than the purpose for which it was intended, no one of them could be undertaken without first exploring the atmosphere.

In 1924, Goddard published an article, "How my speed rocket can propel itself in vacuum", in Popular Science, in which he explained the physics and gave details of the vacuum experiments he had performed to prove the theory. But, no matter how he tried to explain his results, he was not understood by the majority. After one of Goddard's experiments in 1929, a local Worcester newspaper carried the mocking headline "Moon rocket misses target by 238,799 1/2 miles."

Though the public laughed at the "moon man," his paper was read seriously by many rocketeers in America, Europe, and Russia who were stirred to build their own rockets. This work was his most important contribution to the quest to "aim for the stars."

Goddard worked alone with just his team of mechanics and machinists for many years. This was a result of the harsh criticism from the media and other scientists, and his understanding of the military applications which foreign powers might use. Goddard became increasingly suspicious of others and often worked alone, except during the two World Wars, which limited the impact of much of his work. Another limiting factor was the lack of support from the American government, military and academia, all failing to understand the value of the rocket to study the atmosphere and near space, and for military applications.

Nevertheless, Goddard had some influence and was influenced by European rocketry pioneers like Hermann Oberth and his student Max Valier, at least as proponent of the idea of space rocketry and source of inspiration, although each side developed their technology and its scientific basis independently. In Europe the rocketeers were mainly theorists and visionaries. Goddard was the foremost experimenter, and his report was responsible for encouraging many to build their own rockets.

As Germany became ever more war-like, Goddard refused to communicate with German rocket experimenters, though he received more and more of their correspondence. Oberth had Goddard's 1919 paper translated and Wernher von Braun read it. They therefore knew that efficiencies at least thirty times greater than conventional rockets were achievable with Goddard's engine design. Via von Braun and his team joining the US post-war programs there is thus an indirect line of scientific and technology tradition from NASA back to Goddard.

==== "A Correction" ====
Forty-nine years after its editorial mocking Goddard, on July 17, 1969—the day after the launch of Apollo 11—The New York Times published a short item under the headline "A Correction". The three-paragraph statement summarized its 1920 editorial and concluded:

Further investigation and experimentation have confirmed the findings of Isaac Newton in the 17th Century and it is now definitely established that a rocket can function in a vacuum as well as in an atmosphere. The Times regrets the error.

== First liquid-fueled flight ==
The rocket equation indicates that the lighter a rocket's structure is, the greater its final velocity will be, as more of its mass can consist of the propellants. Goddard strove to reduce the mass of his rockets (total mass minus propellant mass). Liquid propellants would enable the combustion chambers to be smaller and lighter. He began considering liquid propellants, including hydrogen and oxygen, as early as 1909. He knew that hydrogen and oxygen was the most efficient fuel/oxidizer combination. However, liquid hydrogen was not readily available in 1921, when he abandoned solid fuel, and he selected gasoline as the safest, cheapest fuel to handle.

=== First static tests ===
Robert Goddard, bundled against the cold weather of March 16, 1926, holds the launching frame of his most notable invention—the first liquid-fueled rocket.

Goddard began experimenting with liquid oxidizer, liquid fuel rockets in September 1921, and successfully tested the first liquid propellant engine in November 1923. It had a cylindrical combustion chamber, using impinging jets to mix and atomize liquid oxygen and gasoline.

In 1924–25, Goddard had problems developing a high-pressure piston pump to send fuel to the combustion chamber. He wanted to scale up the experiments, but his funding would not allow such growth. He decided to forgo the pumps and use a pressurized fuel feed system applying pressure to the fuel tank from a tank of inert gas, a technique that is still used today. The liquid oxygen, some of which evaporated, provided its own pressure.

On December 6, 1925, he tested the simpler pressure feed system. He conducted a static test on the firing stand at the Clark University physics laboratory. The engine successfully lifted its own weight in a 27-second test in the static rack. It was a major success for Goddard, proving that a liquid fuel rocket was possible. The test moved Goddard an important step closer to launching a rocket with liquid fuel.

Goddard conducted an additional test in December, and two more in January 1926. After that, he began preparing for a possible launch of the rocket system.

=== First flight ===
Goddard launched the world's first liquid-fueled (gasoline and liquid oxygen) rocket on March 16, 1926, in Auburn, Massachusetts. Present at the launch were his crew chief Henry Sachs, Esther Goddard, and Percy Roope, who was Clark's assistant professor in the physics department. Goddard's diary entry of the event was notable for its understatement:

March 16. Went to Auburn with S[achs] in am. E[sther] and Mr. Roope came out at 1 p.m. Tried rocket at 2.30. It rose 41 feet & went 184 feet, in 2.5 secs., after the lower half of the nozzle burned off. Brought materials to lab. ...

His diary entry the next day elaborated:

March 17, 1926. The first flight with a rocket using liquid propellants was made yesterday at Aunt Effie's farm in Auburn. ... Even though the release was pulled, the rocket did not rise at first, but the flame came out, and there was a steady roar. After a number of seconds it rose, slowly until it cleared the frame, and then at express train speed, curving over to the left, and striking the ice and snow, still going at a rapid rate.

The rocket, which was later dubbed "Nell", rose just 41 feet (12.5 meters) during a 2.5-second flight that ended 184 feet (56 meters) away in a cabbage field, but it was an important demonstration that liquid fuels and oxidizers were possible propellants for larger rockets. The launch site is now a National Historic Landmark, the Goddard Rocket Launching Site.

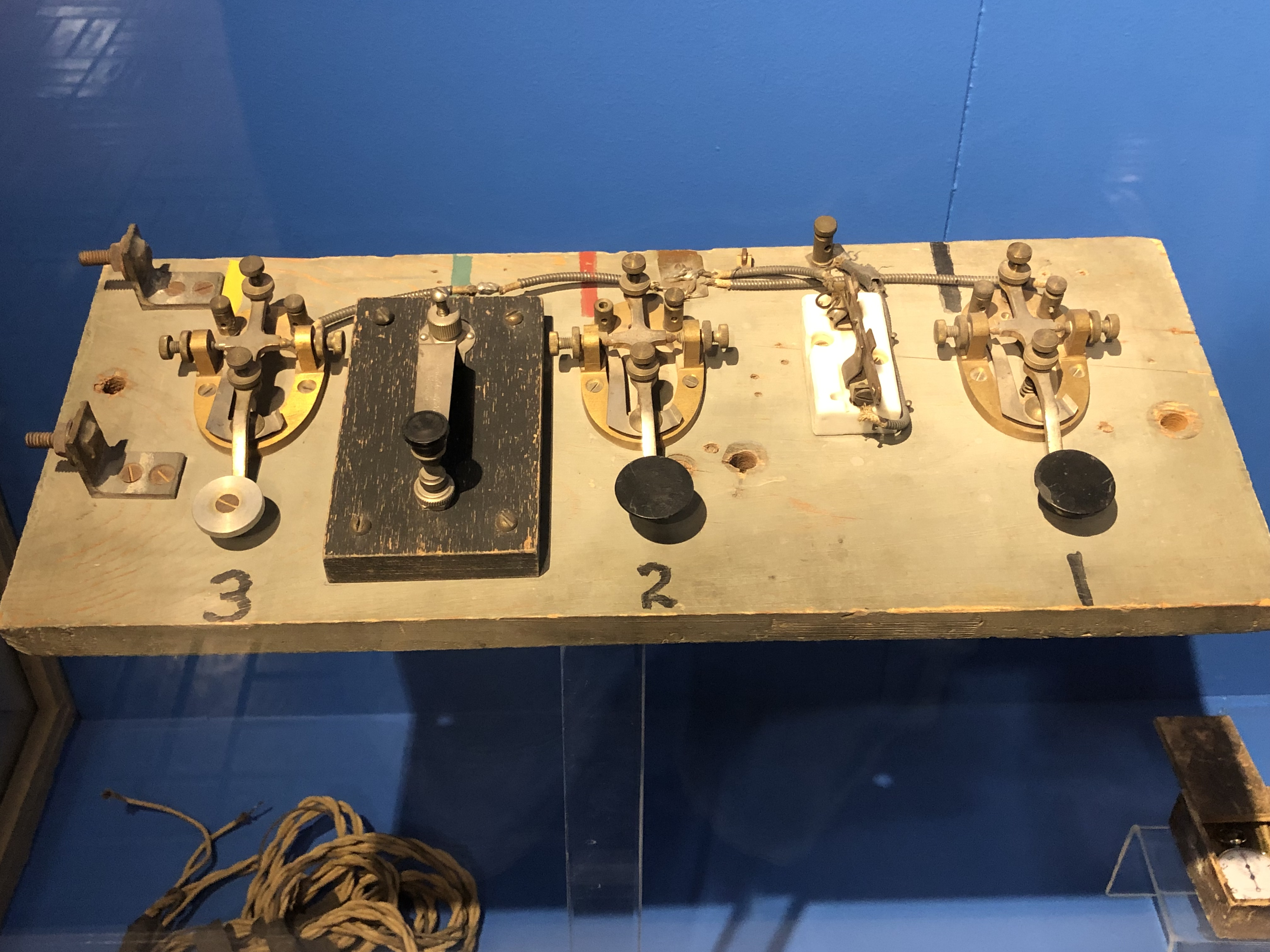
Original launch console for launching Goddard liquid fuel rockets

Viewers familiar with more modern rocket designs may find it difficult to distinguish the rocket from its launching apparatus in the well-known picture of "Nell". The complete rocket is significantly taller than Goddard but does not include the pyramidal support structure which he is grasping. The rocket's combustion chamber is the small cylinder at the top; the nozzle is visible beneath it. The fuel tank, which is also part of the rocket, is the larger cylinder opposite Goddard's torso. The fuel tank is directly beneath the nozzle and is protected from the motor's exhaust by an asbestos cone. Asbestos-wrapped aluminum tubes connect the motor to the tanks, providing both support and fuel transport. This layout is no longer used, since the experiment showed that this was no more stable than placing the combustion chamber and nozzle at the base. By May, after a series of modifications to simplify the plumbing, the combustion chamber and nozzle were placed in the now classic position, at the lower end of the rocket. In the fall of 1926, Goddard made this second version with a parachute, but when two launches were attempted in early 1927 both ended in failure.

Goddard determined early that fins alone were not sufficient to stabilize the rocket in flight and keep it on the desired trajectory in the face of winds aloft and other disturbing forces. He added movable vanes in the exhaust, controlled by a gyroscope, to control and steer his rocket. (The Germans used this technique in their V-2.) He also introduced the more efficient swiveling engine in several rockets, basically the method used to steer large liquid-propellant missiles and launchers today.

== Lindbergh and Goddard ==
After launch of one of Goddard's rockets in July 1929 again gained the attention of the newspapers, Charles Lindbergh learned of his work in a New York Times article. At the time, Lindbergh had begun to wonder what would become of aviation (even space flight) in the distant future and had settled on jet propulsion and rocket flight as a probable next step. After checking with the Massachusetts Institute of Technology (MIT) and being assured that Goddard was a bona fide physicist and not a crackpot, he phoned Goddard in November 1929. Goddard met the aviator soon after in his office at Clark University. Upon meeting Goddard, Lindbergh was immediately impressed by his research, and Goddard was similarly impressed by the flier's interest. He discussed his work openly with Lindbergh, forming an alliance that would last for the rest of his life. While having long since become reluctant to share his ideas, Goddard showed complete openness with those few who shared his dream, and whom he felt he could trust.

By late 1929, Goddard had been attracting additional notoriety with each rocket launch. He was finding it increasingly difficult to conduct his research without unwanted distractions. Lindbergh discussed finding additional financing for Goddard's work and lent his famous name to Goddard's work. In 1930 Lindbergh made several proposals to industry and private investors for funding, which proved all but impossible to find following the recent U.S. stock market crash in October 1929.

=== Guggenheim sponsorship ===
In the spring of 1930, Lindbergh finally found an ally in the Guggenheim family. Financier Daniel Guggenheim agreed to fund Goddard's research over the next four years for a total of $100,000 (~$2.4 million today). The Guggenheim family, especially Harry Guggenheim, would continue to support Goddard's work in the years to come. The Goddards soon moved to Roswell, New Mexico

Historian Clayton Koppes in his history of the Jet Propulsion Laboratory (JPL) observed that "For the rocket experimenters of the 1930s interest always turned to Goddard, for both his achievements and his mystery." Aerospace historian Eugene Emme wrote "Since Goddard's best rocket flight in New Mexico reached only 9,000 feet, the Guggenheim family asked Theodore von Karman and his associates in 1936 to evaluate Goddard's work. "Actually, this was the beginning of the pioneering rocket development at the California Institute of Technology under von Karman, Malina, Millikan, and others; it led to the establishment of the famous Jet Propulsion Laboratory (JPL)."

Because of the military potential of the rocket, Goddard, Lindbergh, Harry Guggenheim, the Smithsonian Institution and others tried in 1940, before the U.S. entered World War II, to convince the Army and Navy of its value. Goddard's services were offered, but there was no interest, initially. Two young, imaginative military officers eventually got the services to attempt to contract with Goddard just prior to the war. The Navy beat the Army to the punch and secured his services to build variable-thrust, liquid-fueled rocket engines for jet-assisted take-off (JATO) of aircraft. These rocket engines were the precursors to the larger throttlable rocket plane engines that helped launch the space age.

Astronaut Buzz Aldrin wrote that his father, Edwin Aldrin Sr. "was an early supporter of Robert Goddard." The elder Aldrin was a student of physics under Goddard at Clark, and worked with Lindbergh to obtain the help of the Guggenheims. Buzz believed that if Goddard had received military support as Wernher von Braun's team had enjoyed in Germany, American rocket technology would have developed much more rapidly in World War II.

=== Lack of vision in the United States ===
Before World War II there was a lack of vision and serious interest in the United States concerning the potential of rocketry, especially in Washington. Although the Weather Bureau was interested beginning in 1929 in Goddard's rocket for atmospheric research, the Bureau could not secure governmental funding. Between the World Wars, the Guggenheim Foundation was the main source of funding for Goddard's research. Goddard's liquid-fueled rocket was neglected by his country, according to aerospace historian Eugene Emme, but was noticed and advanced by other nations, especially the Germans. Goddard showed remarkable prescience in 1923 in a letter to the Smithsonian. He knew that the Germans were very interested in rocketry and said he "would not be surprised if the research would become something in the nature of a race," and he wondered how soon the European "theorists" would begin to build rockets. In 1936, the U.S. military attaché in Berlin asked Charles Lindbergh to visit Germany and learn what he could of their progress in aviation. Although the Luftwaffe showed him their factories and were open concerning their growing airpower, they were silent on the subject of rocketry. When Lindbergh told Goddard of this behavior, Goddard said, "Yes, they must have plans for the rocket. When will our own people in Washington listen to reason?"

Most of the U.S.'s largest universities were also slow to realize rocketry's potential. Just before World War II, the head of the aeronautics department at MIT, at a meeting held by the Army Air Corps to discuss project funding, said that the California Institute of Technology (Caltech) "can take the Buck Rogers job [rocket research]." In 1941, Goddard tried to recruit an engineer for his team from the Massachusetts Institute of Technology (MIT) but could not find one who was interested. There were some exceptions: MIT was at least teaching basic rocketry, and Caltech had courses in rocketry and aerodynamics. After the war, Jerome Hunsaker of MIT, having studied Goddard's patents, stated that "Every liquid-fuel rocket that flies is a Goddard rocket."

While away in Roswell, Goddard was still head of the physics department at Clark University, and Clark allowed him to devote most of his time to rocket research. Likewise, the University of California, Los Angeles (UCLA) permitted astronomer Samuel Herrick to pursue research in space vehicle guidance and control, and shortly after the war to teach courses in spacecraft guidance and orbit determination. Herrick began corresponding with Goddard in 1931 and asked if he should work in this new field, which he named astrodynamics. Herrick said that Goddard had the vision to advise and encourage him in his use of celestial mechanics "to anticipate the basic problem of space navigation." Herrick's work contributed substantially to America's readiness to control flight of Earth satellites and send men to the Moon and back.

== Roswell, New Mexico ==
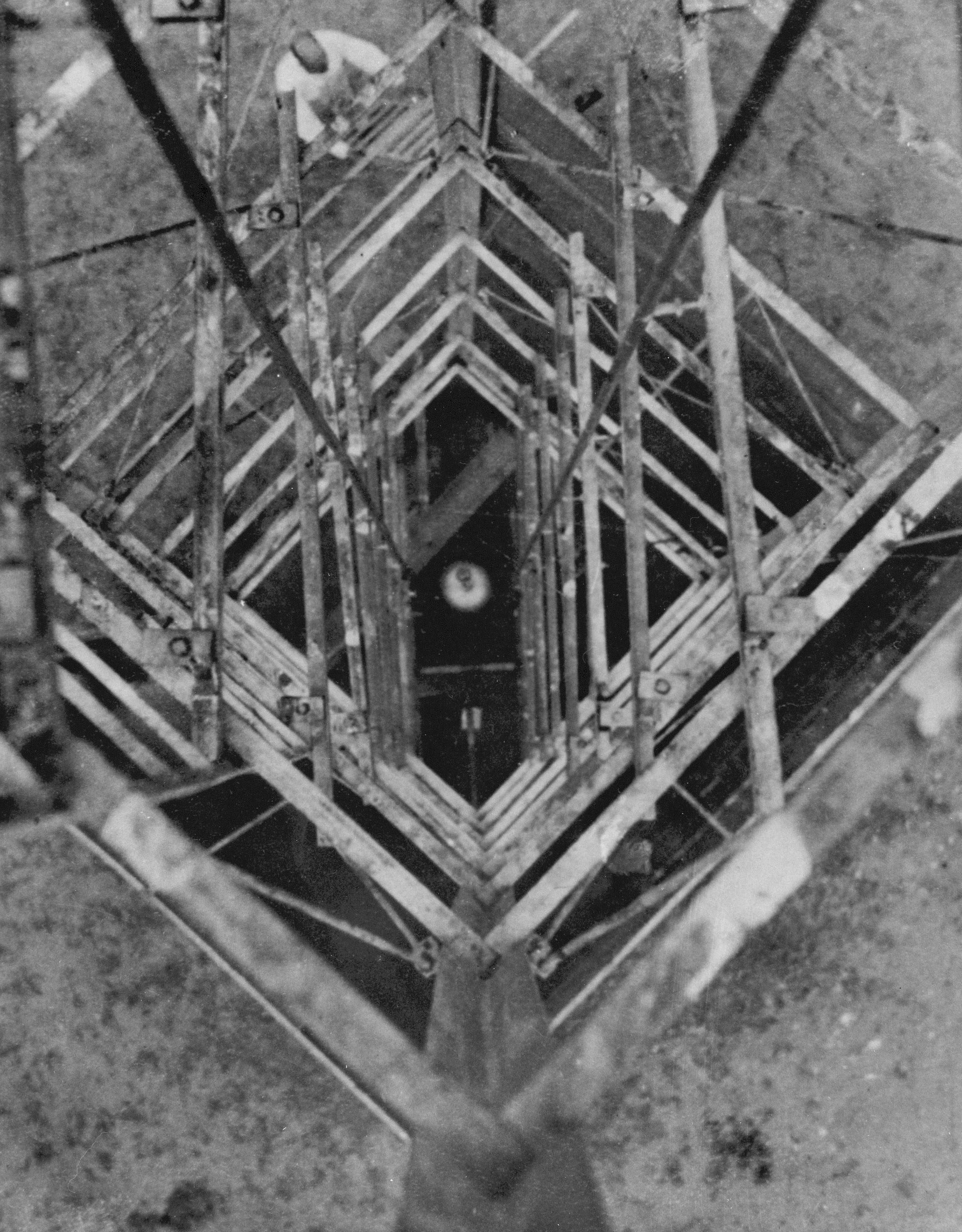
Charles Lindbergh took this picture of Robert H. Goddard's rocket, when he peered down the launching tower on September 23, 1935, in Roswell, New Mexico.

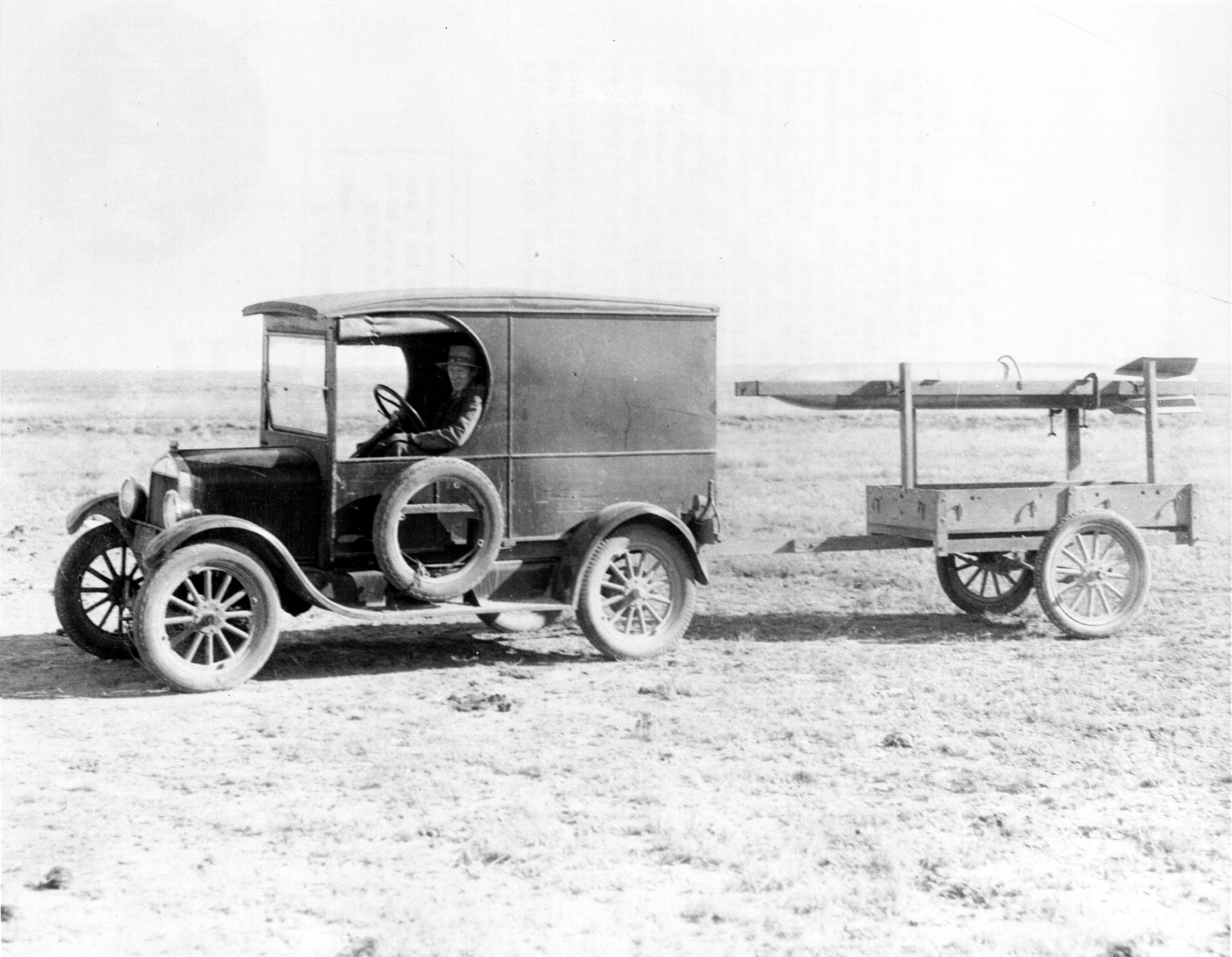
Goddard towing a rocket in Roswell

With new financial backing, Goddard eventually relocated to the Eden Valley Test Site in Roswell, New Mexico, in summer of 1930, where he worked with his team of technicians in near-isolation and relative secrecy for years. He had consulted a meteorologist as to the best area to do his work, and Roswell seemed ideal. Here they would not endanger anyone, would not be bothered by the curious and would experience a more moderate climate (which was also better for Goddard's health). The locals valued personal privacy, knew Goddard desired his, and when travelers asked where Goddard's facilities were located, they would likely be misdirected.

By September 1931, his rockets had the now familiar appearance of a smooth casing with tail-fins. He began experimenting with gyroscopic guidance and made a flight test of such a system in April 1932. A gyroscope mounted on gimbals electrically controlled steering vanes in the exhaust, similar to the system used by the German V-2 over 10 years later. Though the rocket crashed after a short ascent, the guidance system had worked, and Goddard considered the test a success.

A temporary loss of funding from the Guggenheims, as a result of the depression, forced Goddard in spring of 1932 to return to his much-loathed professorial responsibilities at Clark University. He remained at the university until the autumn of 1934, when funding resumed. Because of the death of the senior Daniel Guggenheim, the management of funding was taken on by his son, Harry Guggenheim. Upon his return to Roswell, he began work on his A series of rockets, 4 to 4.5 meters long, and powered by gasoline and liquid oxygen pressurized with nitrogen. The gyroscopic control system was housed in the middle of the rocket, between the propellant tanks.

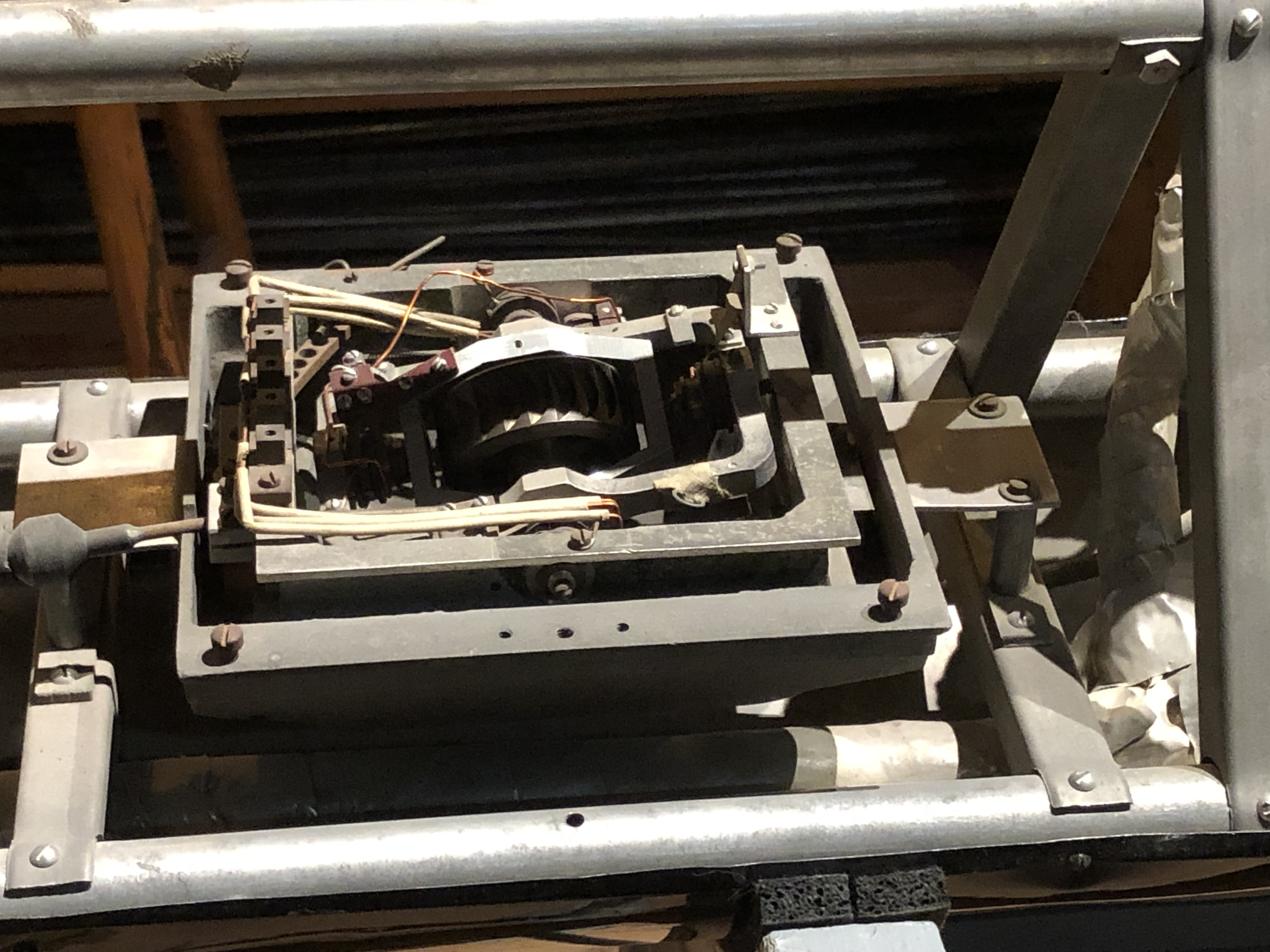
Gyroscope installed inside Goddard's 1939 series L-C rocket

The A-4 used a simpler pendulum system for guidance, as the gyroscopic system was being repaired. On March 8, 1935, it flew up to 1,000 feet, then turned into the wind and, Goddard reported, "roared in a powerful descent across the prairie, at close to, or at, the speed of sound." On March 28, 1935, the A-5 successfully flew vertically to an altitude of (0.91 mi; 4,800 ft) using his gyroscopic guidance system. It then turned to a nearly horizontal path, flew 13,000 feet and achieved a maximum speed of 550 miles per hour. Goddard was elated because the guidance system kept the rocket on a vertical path so well.

In 1936–1939, Goddard began work on the K and L series rockets, which were much more massive and designed to reach very high altitude. The K series consisted of static bench tests of a more powerful engine, achieving a thrust of 624 lbs in February 1936. This work was plagued by trouble with chamber burn-through. In 1923, Goddard had built a regeneratively cooled engine, which circulated liquid oxygen around the outside of the combustion chamber, but he deemed the idea too complicated. (This method is commonly used in modern engines.) He then used a curtain (film) cooling method that involved spraying excess gasoline, which evaporated around the inside wall of the combustion chamber, but this scheme did not work well, and the larger rockets failed. (With refining the method has been used successfully in modern engines.) Goddard returned to a smaller design, and his L-13 reached an altitude of 2.7 kilometers (1.7 mi; 8,900 ft), the highest of any of his rockets. Weight was reduced by using thin-walled fuel tanks wound with high-tensile-strength wire.

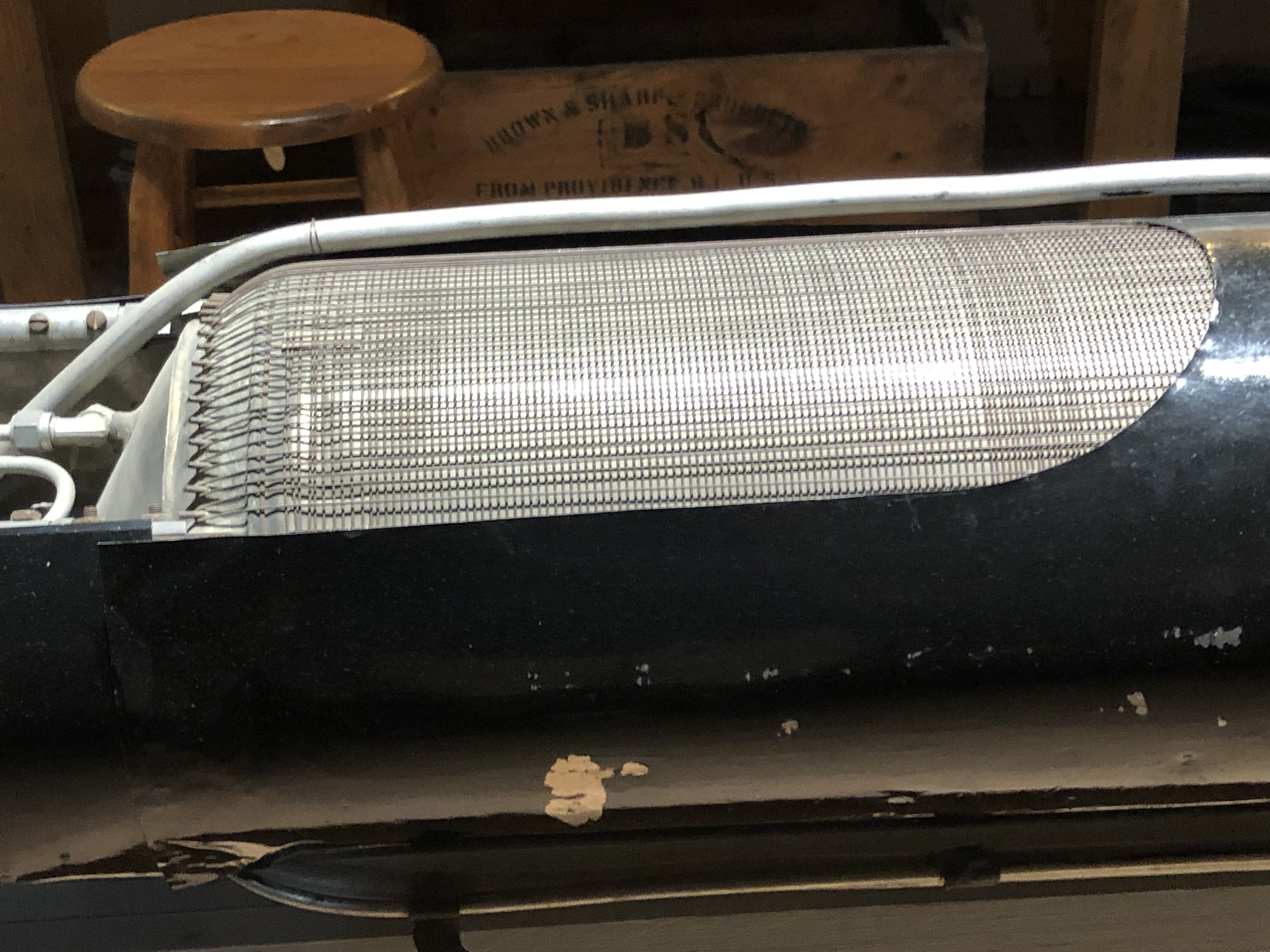
Rocket weight reduction using thin-walled fuel tanks wound with high-tensile-strength wire

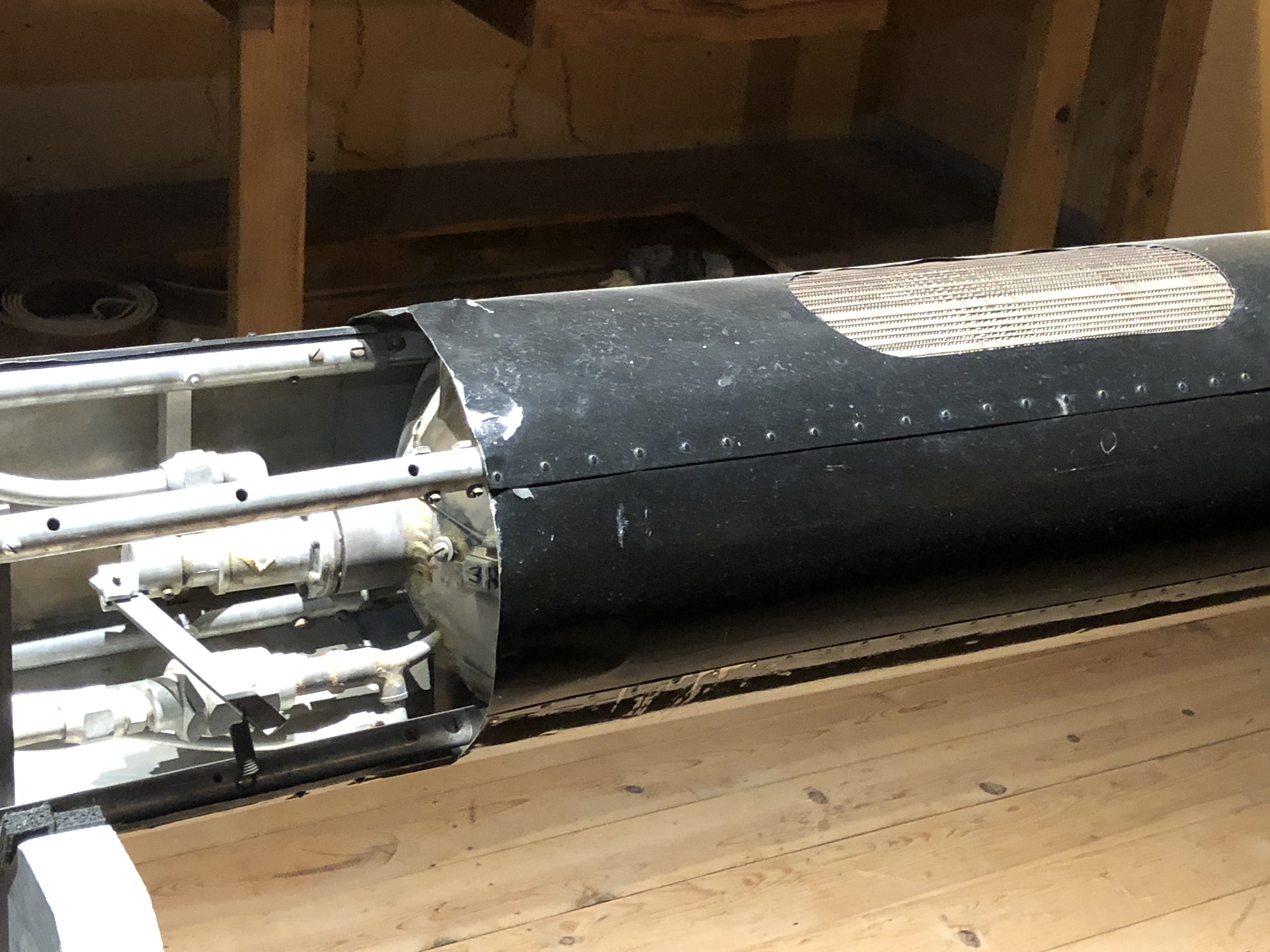
Top tank of L-C rocket

Goddard experimented with many of the features of today's large rockets, such as multiple combustion chambers and nozzles. In November 1936, he flew the world's first rocket (L-7) with multiple chambers, hoping to increase thrust without increasing the size of a single chamber. It had four combustion chambers, reached a height of 200 feet, and corrected its vertical path using blast vanes until one chamber burned through. This flight demonstrated that a rocket with multiple combustion chambers could fly stably and be easily guided. In July 1937 he replaced the guidance vanes with a movable tail section containing a single combustion chamber, as if on gimbals (thrust vectoring). The flight was of low altitude, but a large disturbance, probably caused by a change in the wind velocity, was corrected back to vertical. In an August test the flight path was corrected seven times by the movable tail and was captured on film by Mrs Goddard.

From 1940 to 1941, Goddard worked on the P series of rockets, which used propellant turbopumps (also powered by gasoline and liquid oxygen). The lightweight pumps produced higher propellant pressures, permitting a more powerful engine (greater thrust) and a lighter structure (lighter tanks and no pressurization tank), but two launches both ended in crashes after reaching an altitude of only a few hundred feet. The turbopumps worked well, however, and Goddard was pleased.

When Goddard mentioned the need for turbopumps, Harry Guggenheim suggested that he contact pump manufacturers to aid him. None were interested, as the development cost of these miniature pumps was prohibitive. Goddard's team was therefore left on its own and from September 1938 to June 1940 designed and tested the small turbopumps and gas generators to operate the turbines. Esther later said that the pump tests were "the most trying and disheartening phase of the research."

Goddard was able to flight-test many of his rockets, but many resulted in what the uninitiated would call failures, usually resulting from engine malfunction or loss of control. Goddard did not consider them failures, however, because he felt that he always learned something from a test. Most of his work involved static tests, which are a standard procedure today, before a flight test. He wrote to a correspondent: "It is not a simple matter to differentiate unsuccessful from successful experiments. ... [Most] work that is finally successful is the result of a series of unsuccessful tests in which difficulties are gradually eliminated."

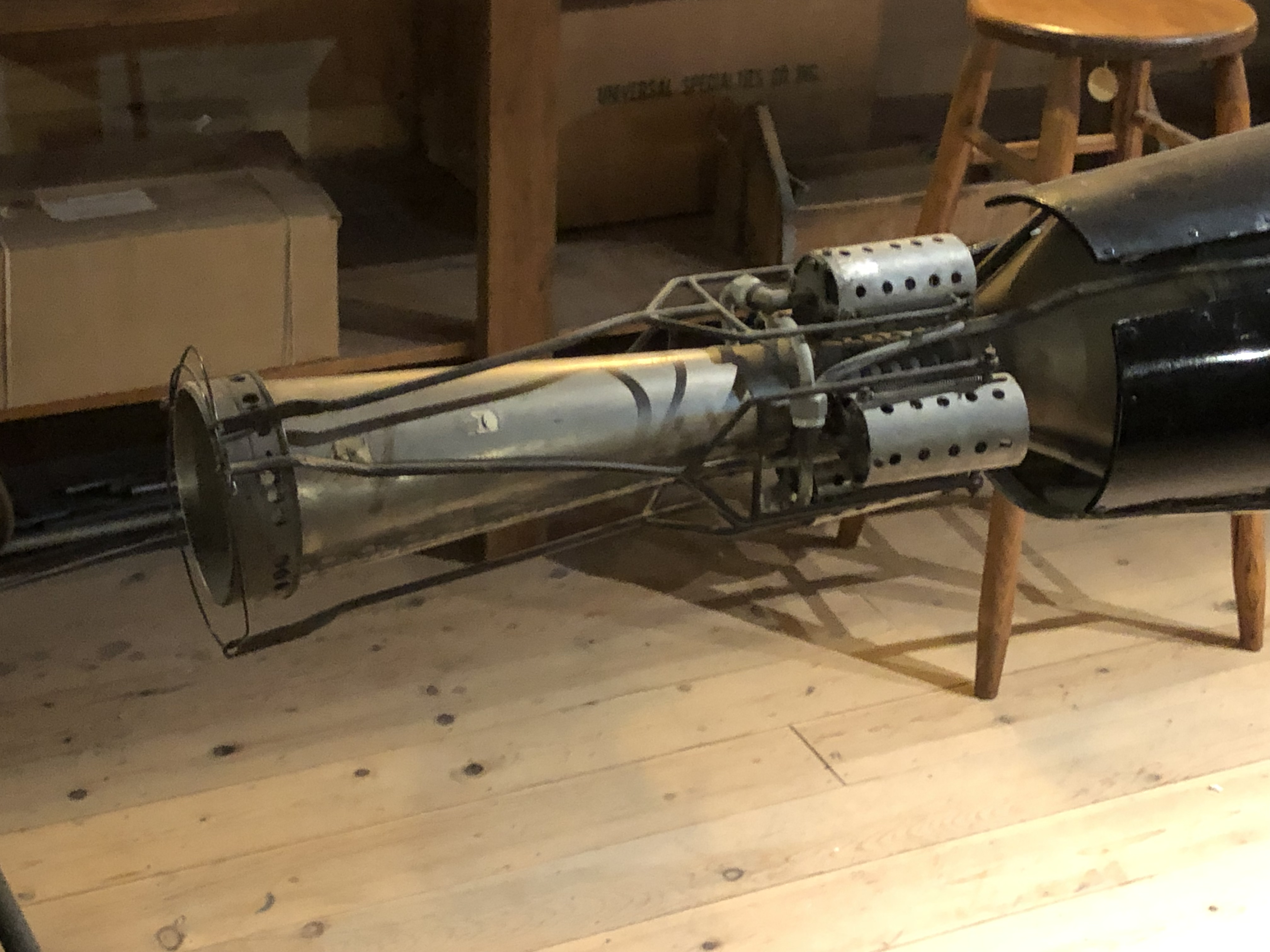
Close up of Goddard's 1939 series L-C steerable rocket engine

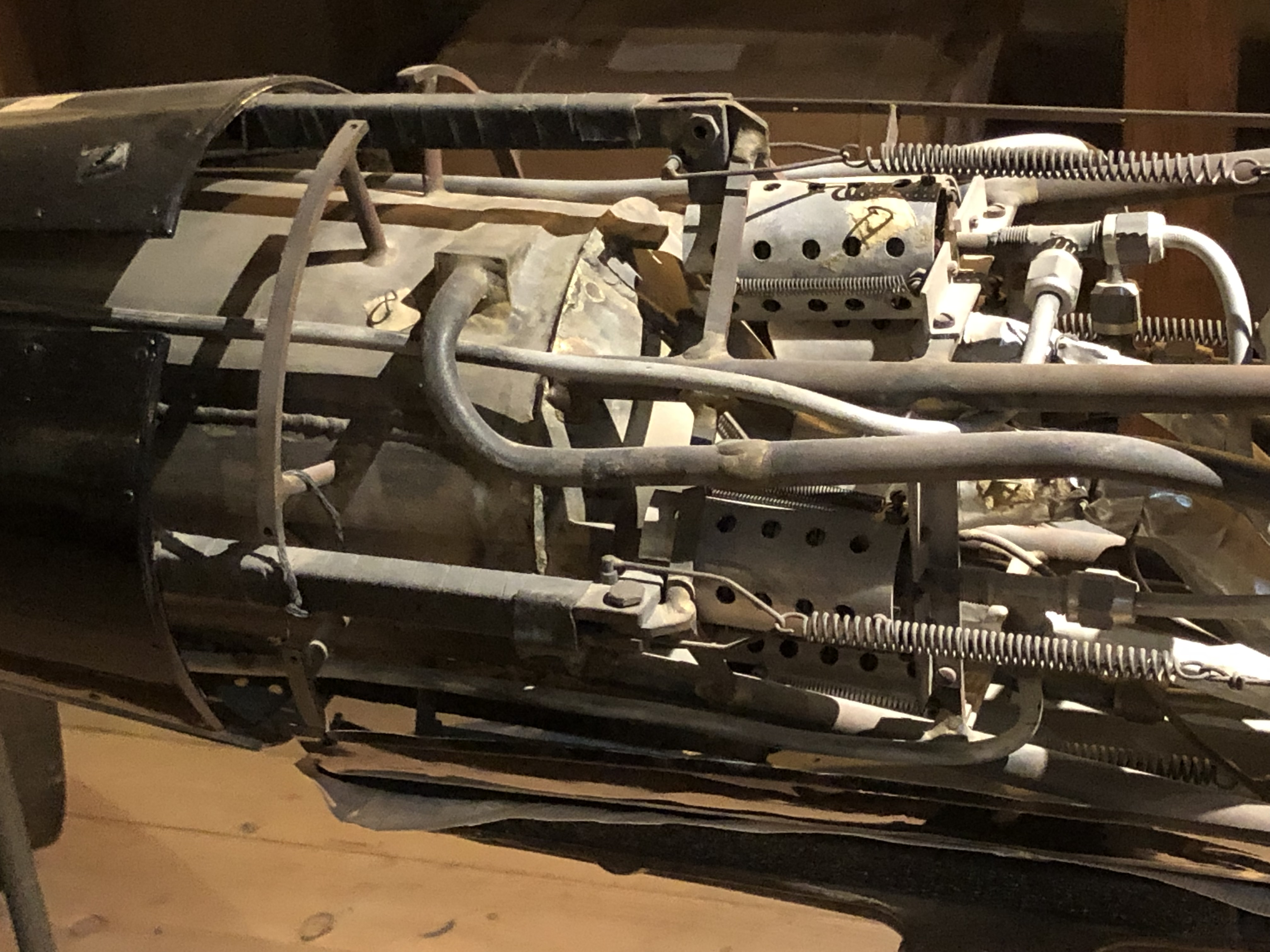
Combustion chamber of Goddard's 1939 series L-C rocket

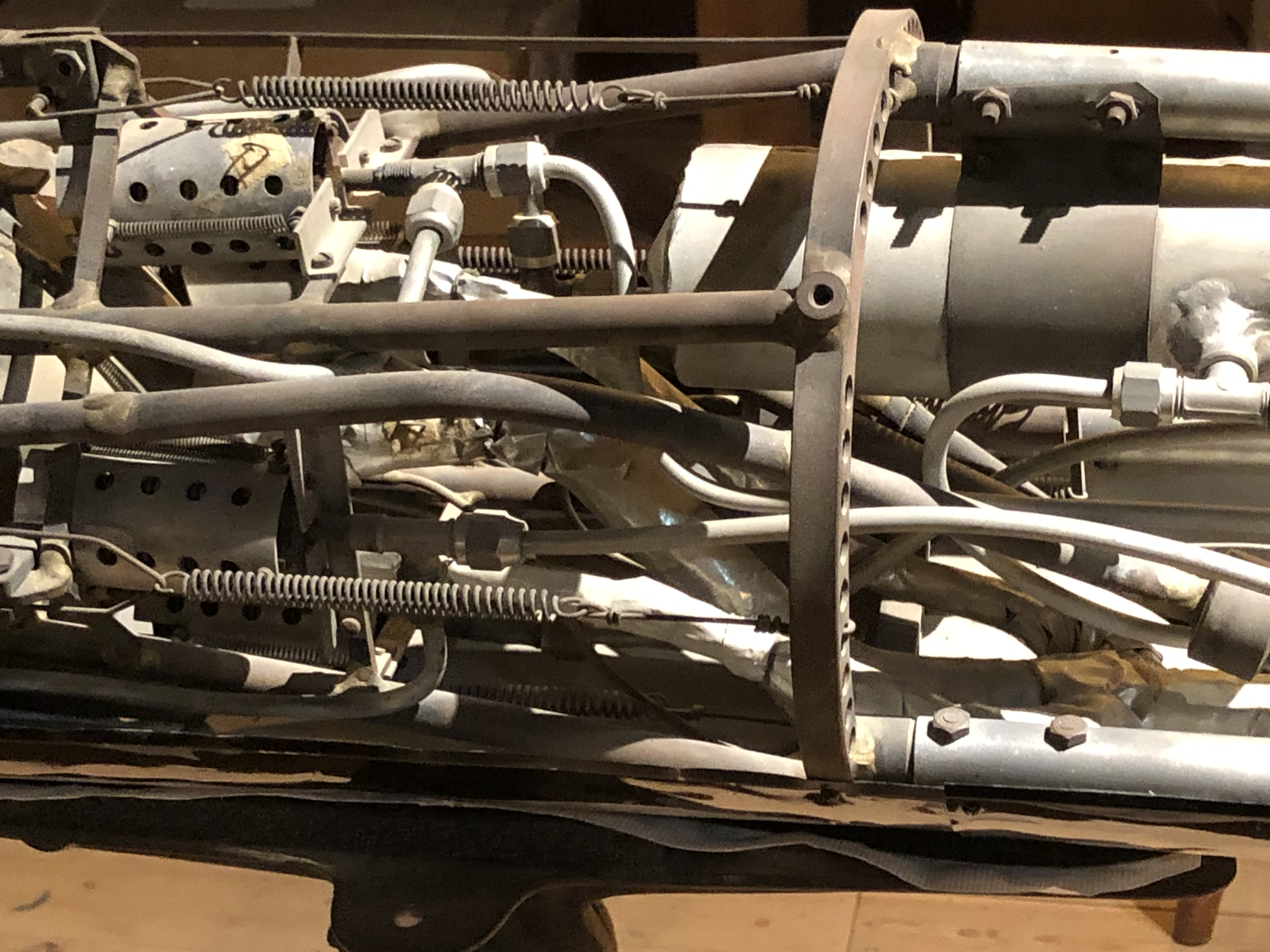
Springs that stabilize steerable rocket engine on Goddard's 1939 series L-C rocket

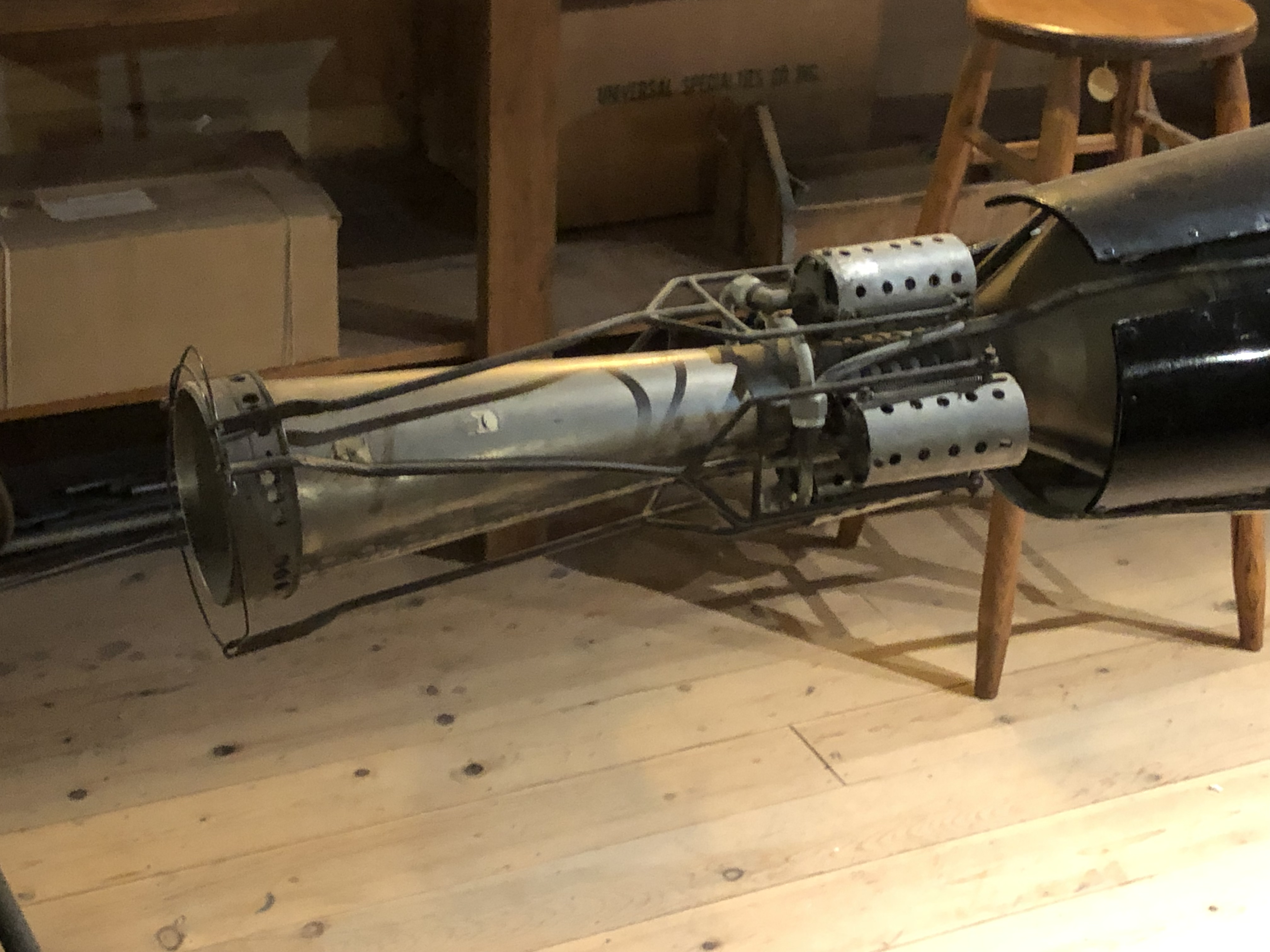
Close up of Goddard's 1939 series L-C steerable rocket engine

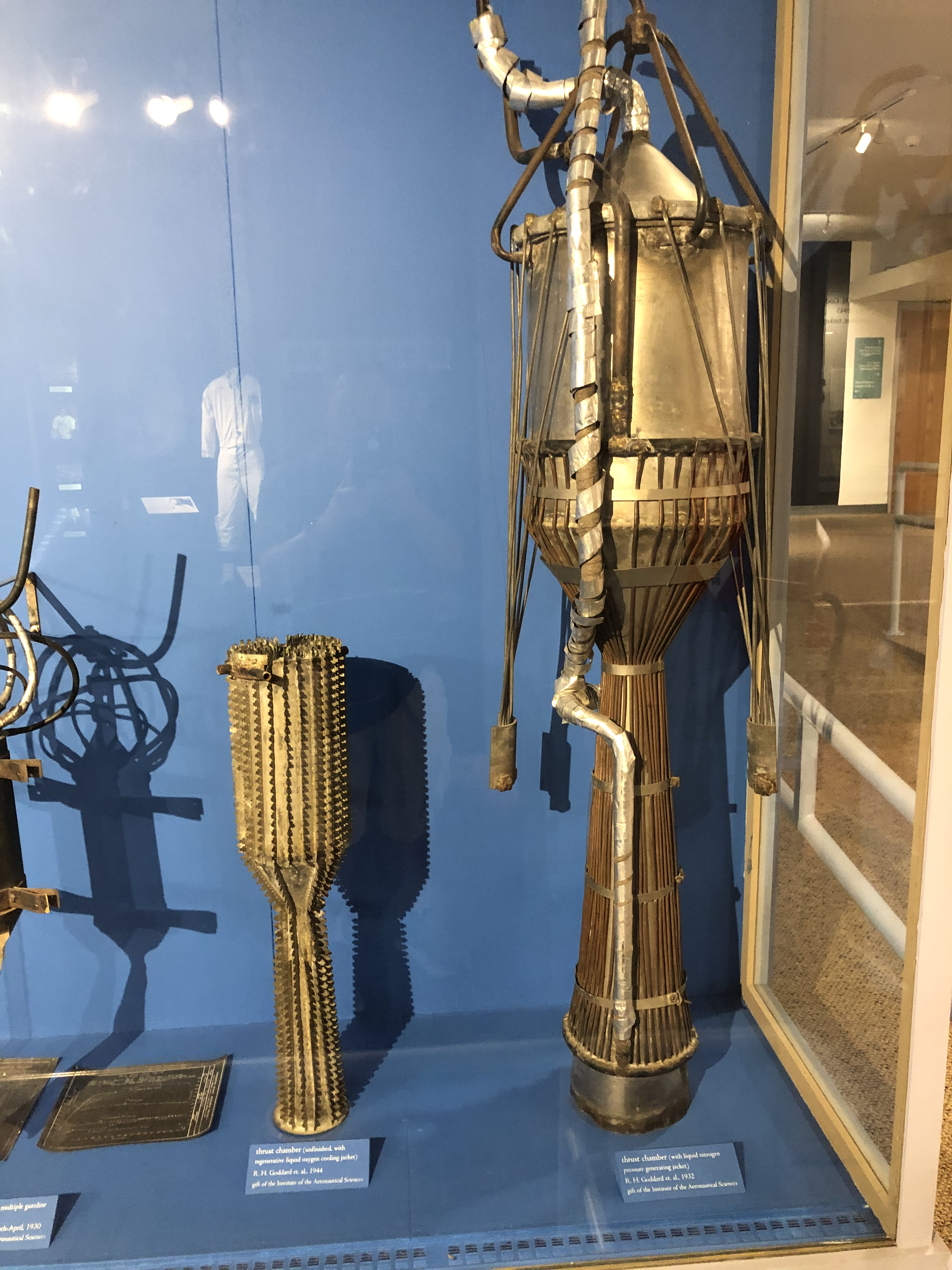
Thrust chambers for Goddard liquid fuel rocket engines

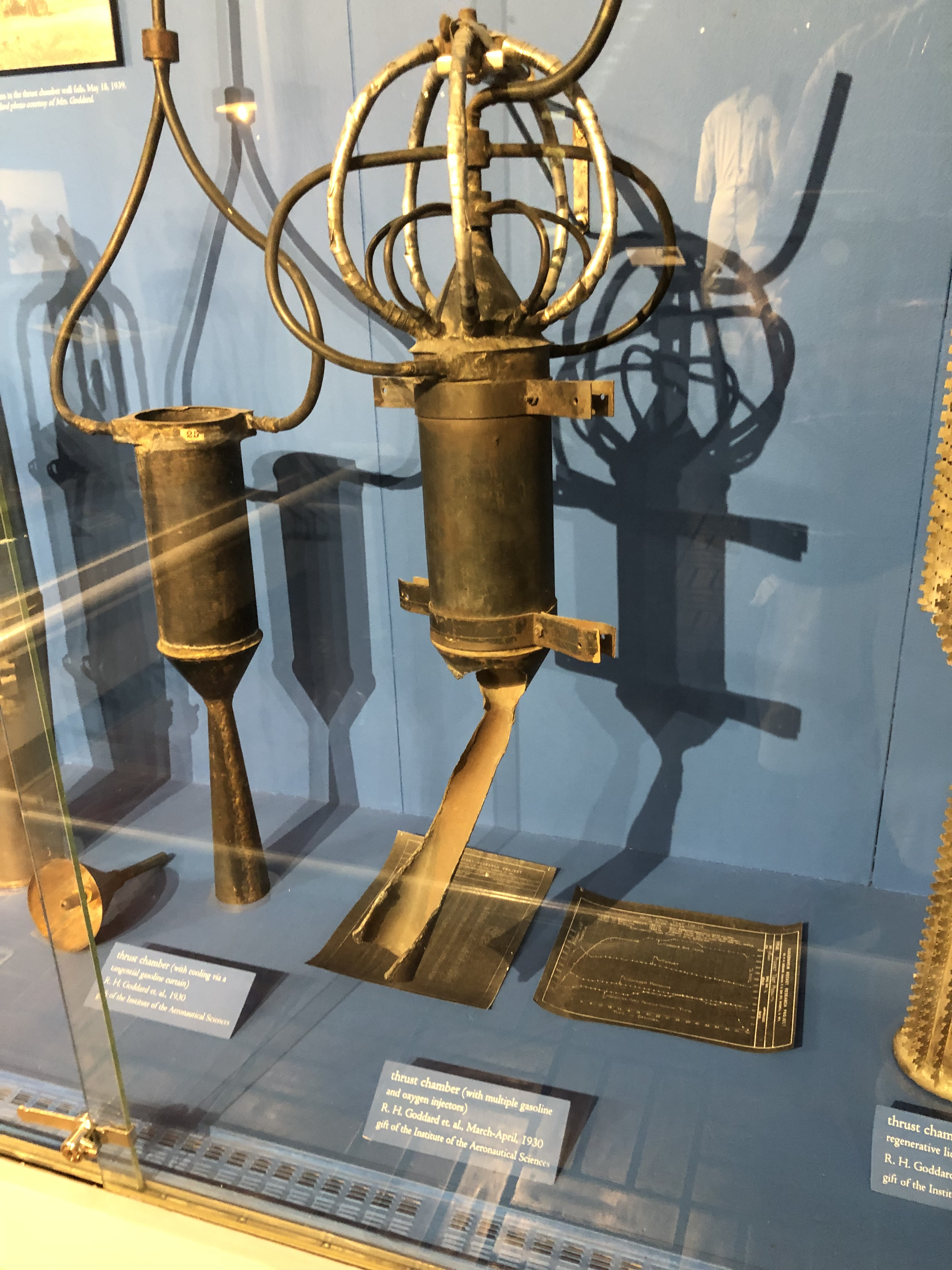
Thrust chambers for Goddard liquid fuel rocket engines

=== General Jimmy Doolittle ===
Jimmy Doolittle was introduced to the field of space science at an early point in its history. He recalls in his autobiography, "I became interested in rocket development in the 1930s when I met Robert H. Goddard, who laid the foundation. ... While with Shell Oil I worked with him on the development of a type of fuel. ... " Harry Guggenheim and Charles Lindbergh arranged for (then Major) Doolittle to discuss with Goddard a special blend of gasoline. Doolittle flew himself to Roswell in October 1938 and was given a tour of Goddard's shop and a "short course" in rocketry. He then wrote a memo, including a rather detailed description of Goddard's rocket. In closing he said, "interplanetary transportation is probably a dream of the very distant future, but with the moon only a quarter of a million miles away—who knows!" In July 1941, he wrote Goddard that he was still interested in his rocket propulsion research. The Army was interested only in JATO at this point. However, Doolittle and Lindbergh were concerned about the state of rocketry in the US, and Doolittle remained in touch with Goddard.

Shortly after World War II, Doolittle spoke concerning Goddard to an American Rocket Society (ARS) conference at which a large number interested in rocketry attended. He later stated that at that time "we [in the aeronautics field] had not given much credence to the tremendous potential of rocketry." In 1956, he was appointed chairman of the National Advisory Committee for Aeronautics (NACA) because the previous chairman, Jerome C. Hunsaker, thought Doolittle to be more sympathetic than other scientists and engineers to the rocket, which was increasing in importance as a scientific tool as well as a weapon. Doolittle was instrumental in the successful transition of the NACA to the National Aeronautics and Space Administration (NASA) in 1958. He was offered the position as first administrator of NASA, but he turned it down.

=== Launch history ===
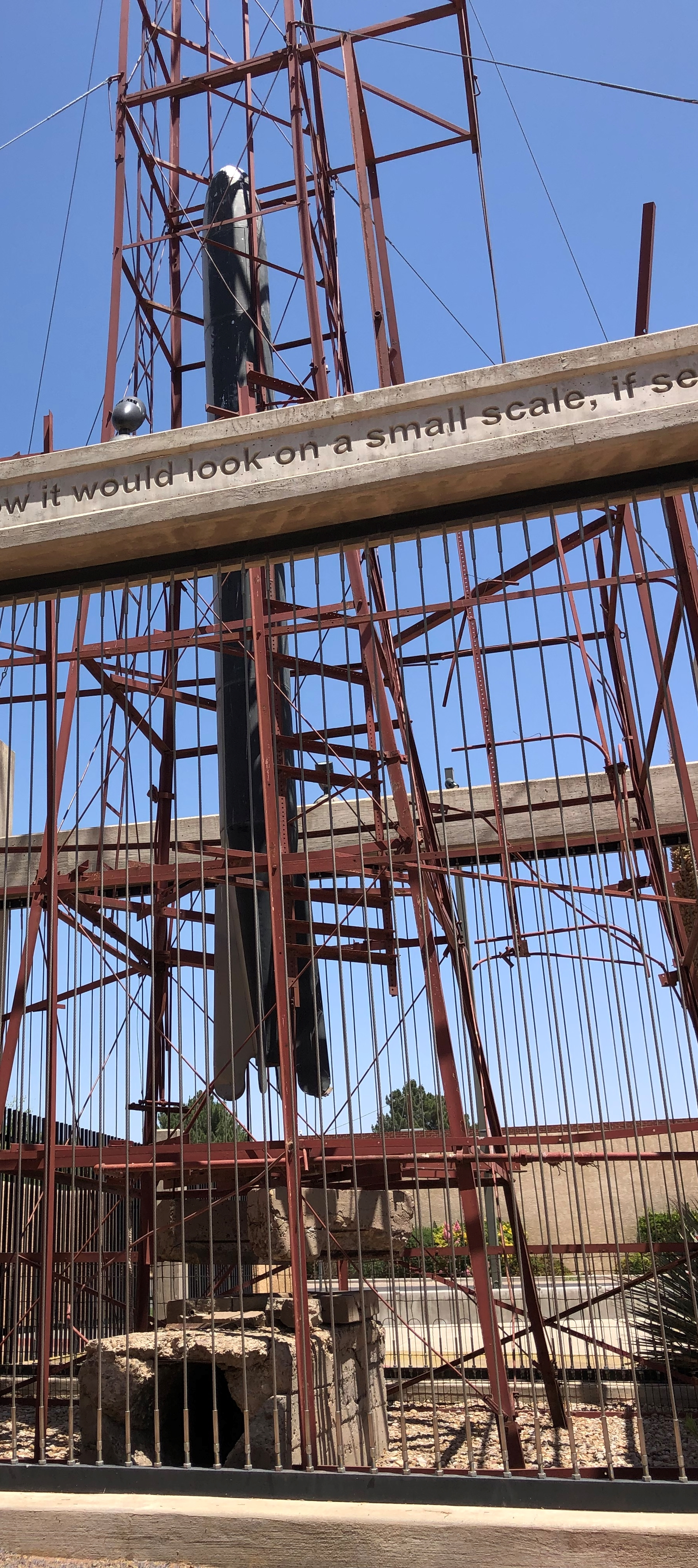
Dr. Goddards original launch tower with blast deflector below rocket engine

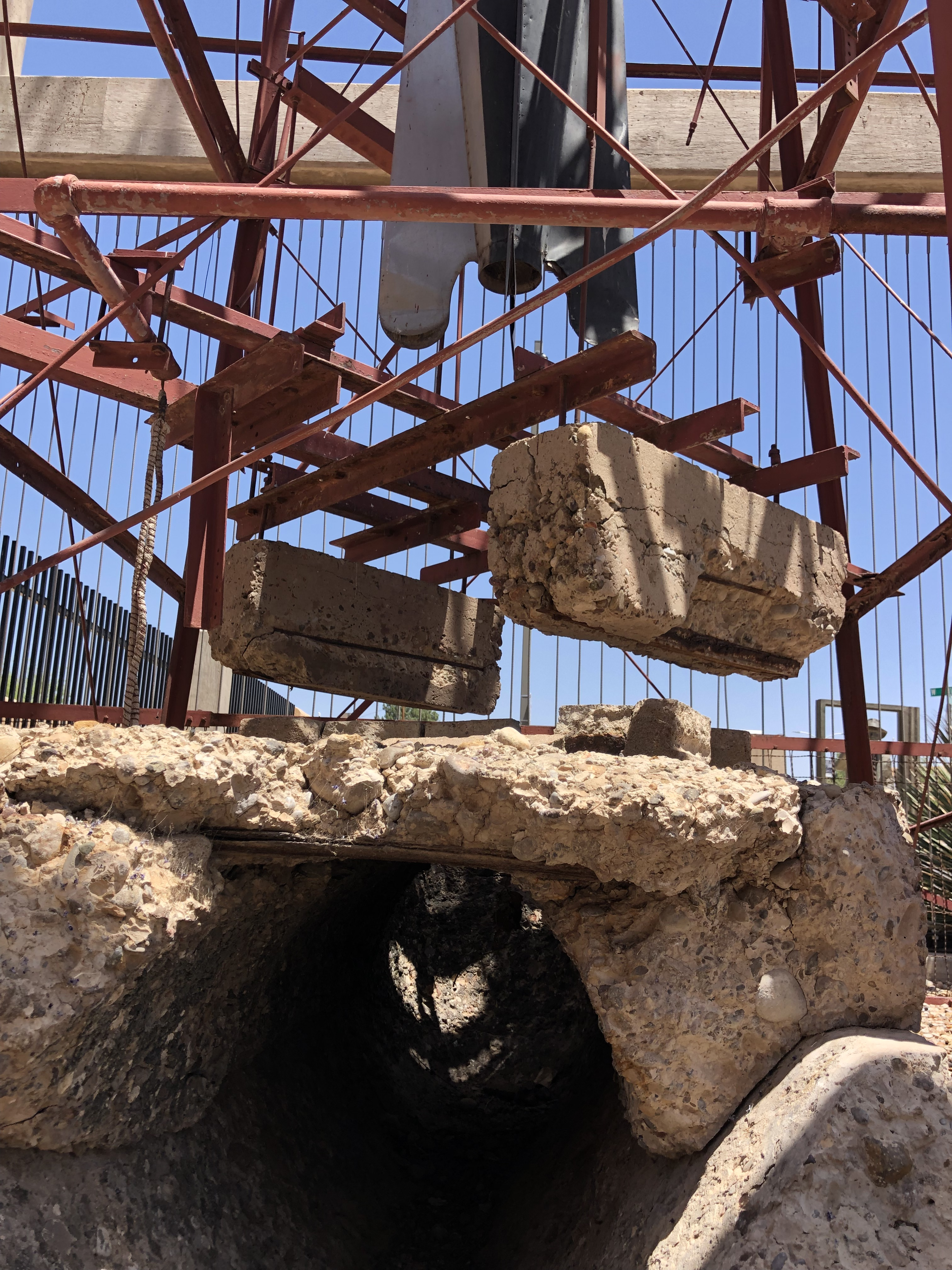
Goddard blast deflector—view into side exhaust

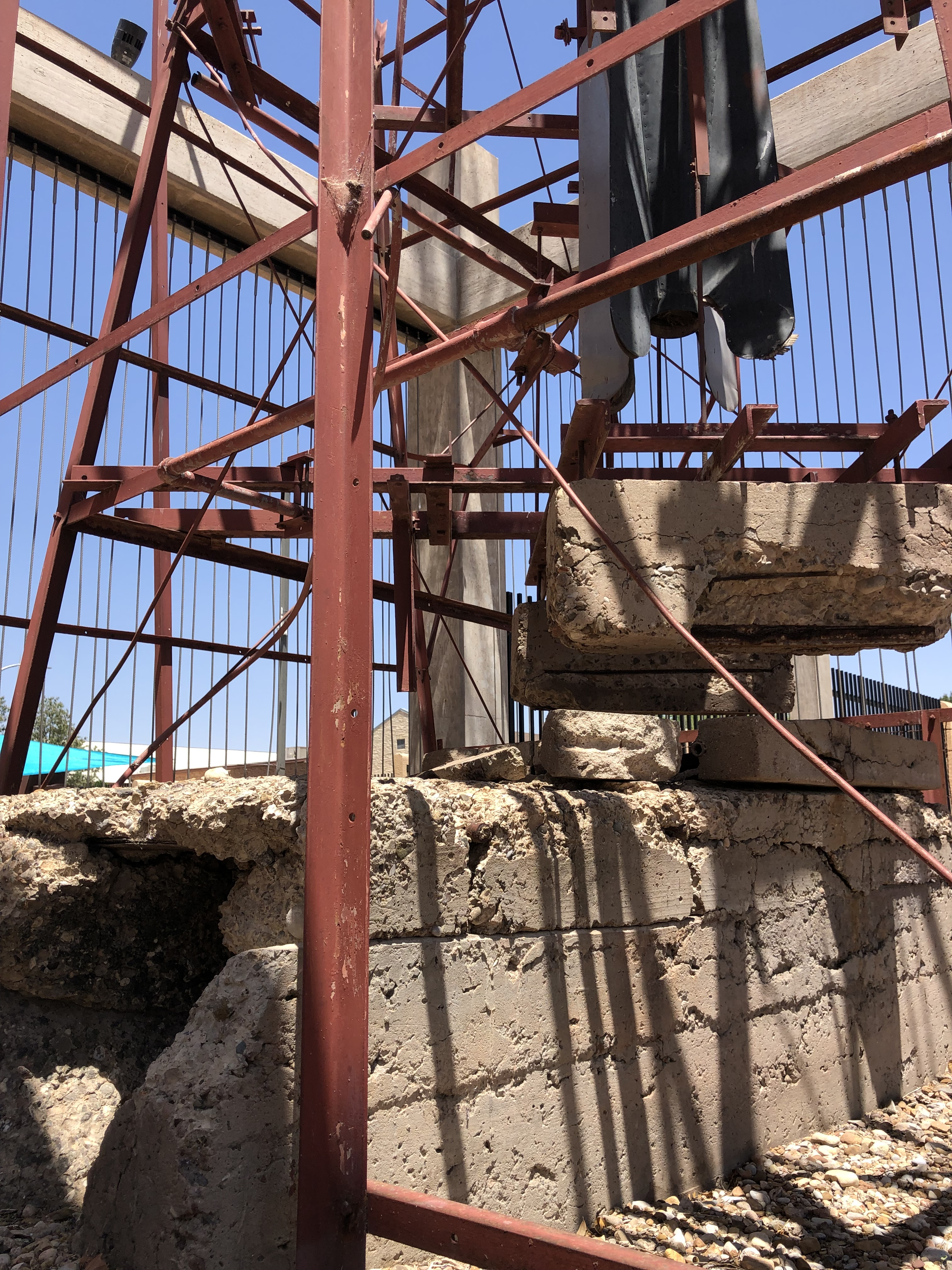
Goddard blast deflector—side view of exhaust

Between 1926 and 1941, the following 35 rockets were launched:

| Date | Type | Altitude in feet | Altitude in meters | Flight duration | Notes |
|---|---|---|---|---|---|
| March 16, 1926 | Goddard 1 | 41 | 12.5 | 2.5 s | first liquid rocket launch |
| April 3, 1926 | Goddard 1 | 49 | 15 | 4.2 s | record altitude |
| December 26, 1928 | Goddard 3 | 16 | 5 | unknown | |
| July 17, 1929 | Goddard 3 | 90 | 27 | 5.5 s | record altitude |
| December 30, 1930 | Goddard 4 | 2,000 | 610 | unknown | record altitude |
| September 29, 1931 | Goddard 4 | 180 | 55 | 9.6 s | |
| October 13, 1931 | Goddard 4 | 1,700 | 520 | unknown | |
| October 27, 1931 | Goddard 4 | 1,330 | 410 | unknown | |
| April 19, 1932 | - | 135 | 41 | 5 s | |
| February 16, 1935 | A series | 650 | 200 | unknown | |
| March 8, 1935 | A series | 1,000 | 300 | 12 s | |
| March 28, 1935 | A series | 4,800 | 1,460 | 20 s | record altitude |
| May 31, 1935 | A series | 7,500 | 2,300 | unknown | record altitude |
| June 25, 1935 | A series | 120 | 37 | 10 s | |
| July 12, 1935 | A series | 6,600 | 2,000 | 14 s | |
| October 29, 1935 | A series | 4,000 | 1,220 | 12 s | |
| July 31, 1936 | L series, Section A | 200 | 60 | 5 s | |
| October 3, 1936 | L-A | 200 | 60 | 5 s | |
| November 7, 1936 | L-A | 200 | 60 | unknown | 4 thrust chambers |
| December 18, 1936 | L series, Section B | 3 | 1 | unknown | Veered horizontally immediately after launch |
| February 1, 1937 | L-B | 1,870 | 570 | 20.5 s | |
| February 27, 1937 | L-B | 1,500 | 460 | 20 s | |
| March 26, 1937 | L-B | 8,000-9,000 | 2,500–2,700 | 22.3 s | Highest altitude achieved |
| April 22, 1937 | L-B | 6,560 | 2,000 | 21.5 s | |
| May 19, 1937 | L-B | 3,250 | 990 | 29.5 s | |
| July 28, 1937 | L-series, Section C | 2,055 | 630 | 28 s | Movable tail steering |
| August 26, 1937 | L-C | 2,000 | 600 | unknown | Movable tail |
| November 24, 1937 | L-C | 100 | 30 | unknown | |
| March 6, 1938 | L-C | 525 | 160 | unknown | |
| March 17, 1938 | L-C | 2,170 | 660 | 15 s | |
| April 20, 1938 | L-C | 4,215 | 1,260 | 25.3 s | |
| May 26, 1938 | L-C | 140 | 40 | unknown | |
| August 9, 1938 | L-C | 4,920 (visual); 3,294 (barograph) | 1,500; 1,000 | unknown | |
| August 9, 1940 | P-series, Section C | 300 | 90 | unknown | |
| May 8, 1941 | P-C | 250 | 80 | unknown | |

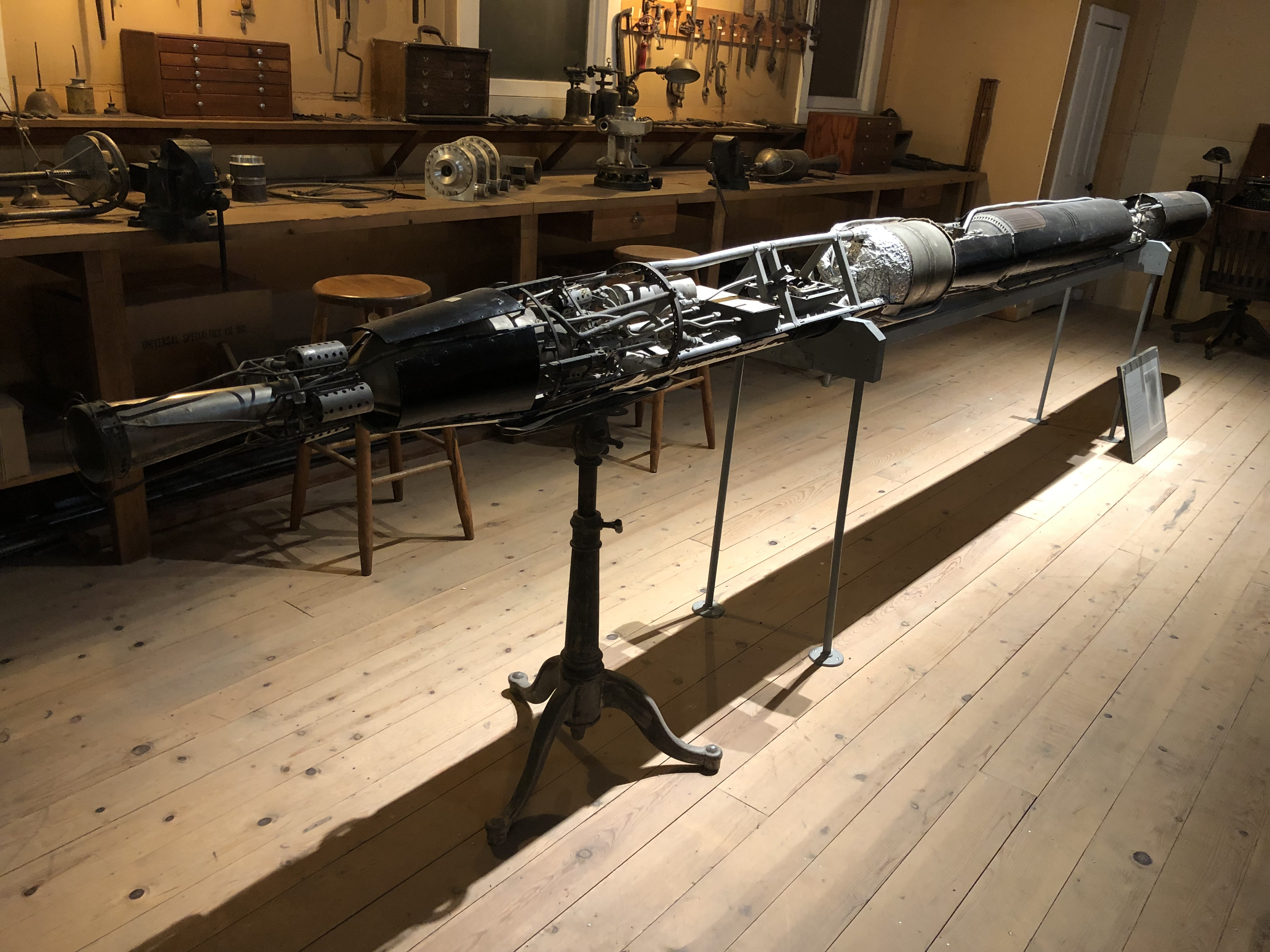
Goddard L-C rocket

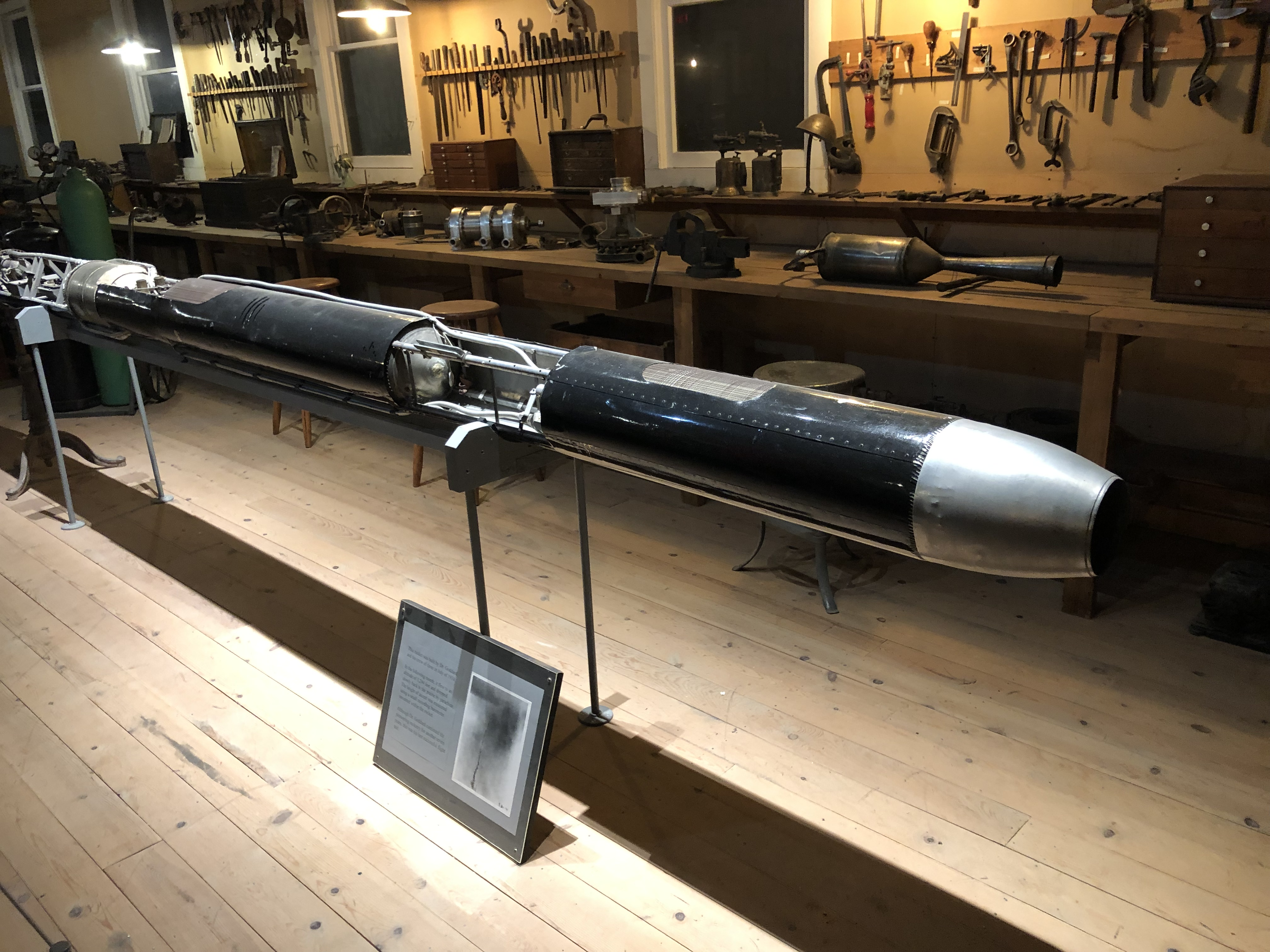
Top view of 1939 L-C series rocket.

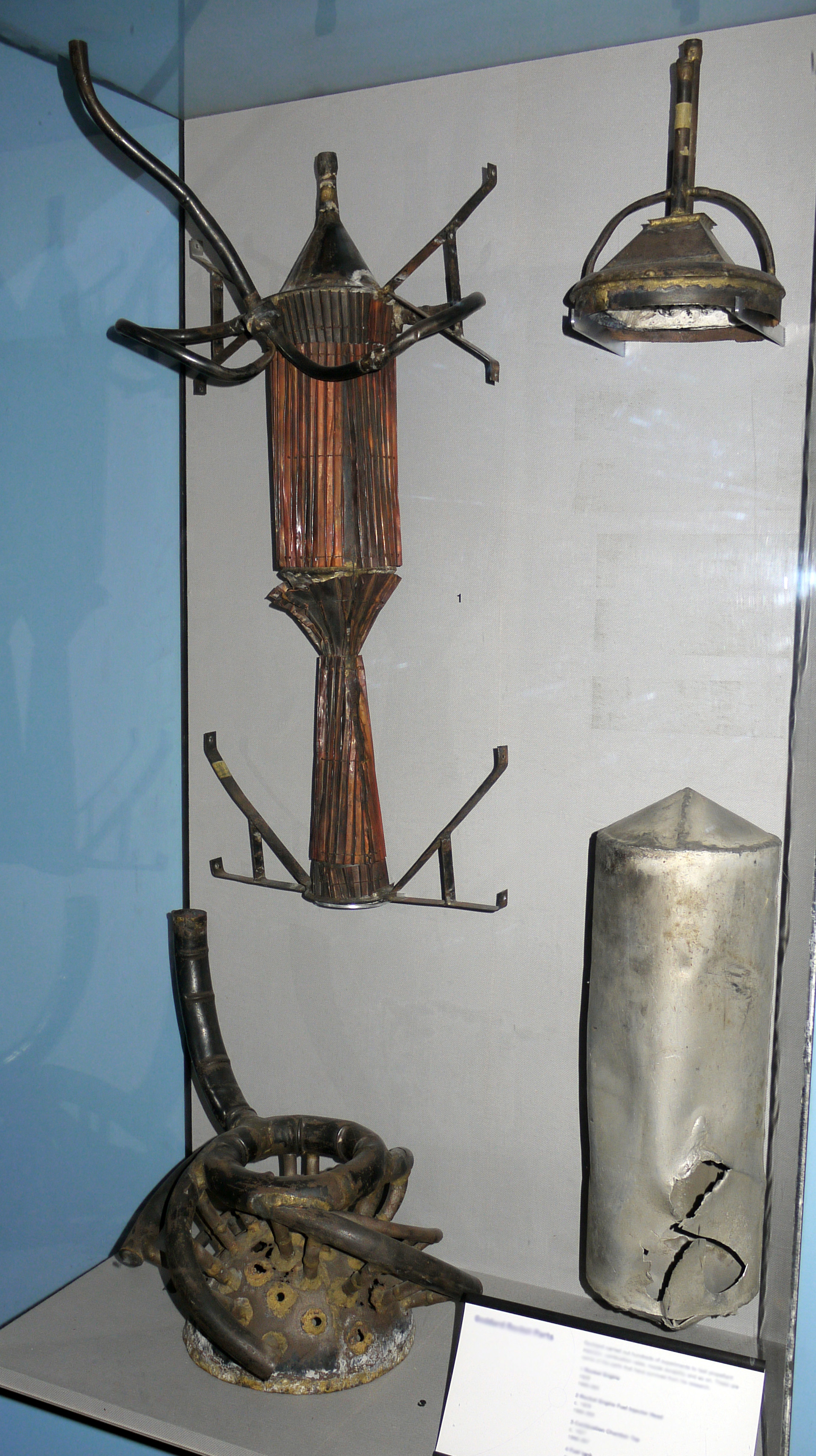
Some of the parts of Goddard's rockets

=== Analysis of results ===
As an instrument for reaching extreme altitudes, Goddard's rockets were not very successful; they did not achieve an altitude greater than 2.7 km in 1937, while a balloon sonde had already reached 35 km in 1921. By contrast, German rocket scientists had achieved an altitude of 2.4 km with the A-2 rocket in 1934, 8 km by 1939 with the A-5, and 176 km in 1942 with the A-4 (V-2) launched vertically, reaching the outer limits of the atmosphere and into space.

Goddard's pace was slower than the Germans' because he did not have the resources they did. Simply reaching high altitudes was not his primary goal; he was trying, with a methodical approach, to perfect his liquid fuel engine and subsystems such as guidance and control so that his rocket could eventually achieve high altitudes without tumbling in the rare atmosphere, providing a stable vehicle for the experiments it would eventually carry. He had built the necessary turbopumps and was on the verge of building larger, lighter, more reliable rockets to reach extreme altitudes carrying scientific instruments when World War II intervened and changed the path of American history. He hoped to return to his experiments in Roswell after the war.

Though by the end of the Roswell years much of his technology had been replicated independently by others, he introduced new developments to rocketry that were used in this new enterprise: lightweight turbopumps, variable-thrust engine (in U.S.), engine with multiple combustion chambers and nozzles, and curtain cooling of combustion chamber.

Although Goddard had brought his work in rocketry to the attention of the United States Army, between World Wars, he was rebuffed, since the Army largely failed to grasp the military application of large rockets and said there was no money for new experimental weapons. German military intelligence, by contrast, had paid attention to Goddard's work. The Goddards noticed that some mail had been opened, and some mailed reports had gone missing. An accredited military attaché to the US, Friedrich von Boetticher, sent a four-page report to the Abwehr in 1936, and the spy Gustav Guellich sent a mixture of facts and made-up information, claiming to have visited Roswell and witnessed a launch. The Abwehr was very interested and responded with more questions about Goddard's work. Guellich's reports did include information about fuel mixtures and the important concept of fuel-curtain cooling, but thereafter the Germans received very little information about Goddard.

The Soviet Union had a spy (name still not declassified as of 2009) in the U.S. Navy Bureau of Aeronautics. In 1935, she gave them a report Goddard had written for the Navy in 1933. It contained results of tests and flights and suggestions for military uses of his rockets. The Soviets considered this to be very valuable information. It provided few design details, but gave them the direction and knowledge about Goddard's progress.

== Annapolis, Maryland ==
Navy Lieutenant Charles F. Fischer, who had visited Goddard in Roswell earlier and gained his confidence, believed Goddard was doing valuable work and was able to convince the Bureau of Aeronautics in September 1941 that Goddard could build the JATO unit the Navy desired. While still in Roswell, and before the Navy contract took effect, Goddard began in September to apply his technology to build a variable-thrust engine to be attached to a PBY seaplane. By May 1942, he had a unit that could meet the Navy's requirements and be able to launch a heavily loaded aircraft from a short runway. In February, he received part of a PBY with bullet holes apparently acquired in the Pearl Harbor attack. Goddard wrote to Guggenheim that "I can think of nothing that would give me greater satisfaction than to have it contribute to the inevitable retaliation."

In April, Fischer notified Goddard that the Navy wanted to do all its rocket work at the Engineering Experiment Station at Annapolis. Esther, worried that a move to the climate of Maryland would cause Robert's health to deteriorate faster, objected. But the patriotic Goddard replied, "Esther, don't you know there's a war on?" Fischer also questioned the move, as Goddard could work just as well in Roswell. Goddard simply answered, "I was wondering when you would ask me." Fischer had wanted to offer him something bigger—a long range missile—but JATO was all he could manage, hoping for a greater project later. It was a case of a square peg in a round hole, according to a disappointed Goddard.

Goddard and his team had already been in Annapolis a month and had tested his constant-thrust JATO engine when he received a Navy telegram, forwarded from Roswell, ordering him to Annapolis. Lt. Fischer asked for a crash effort. By August, his engine was producing 800 lbs of thrust for 20 seconds, and Fischer was anxious to try it on a PBY. On the sixth test run, with all bugs worked out, the PBY, piloted by Fischer, was pushed into the air from the Severn River. Fischer landed and prepared to launch again. Goddard had wanted to check the unit, but radio contact with the PBY had been lost. On the seventh try, the engine caught fire. The plane was 150 feet up when flight was aborted. Because Goddard had installed a safety feature at the last minute, there was no explosion and there were no deaths. The problem's cause was traced to hasty installation and rough handling. Cheaper, safer solid fuel JATO engines were eventually selected by the armed forces. An engineer later said, "Putting [Goddard's] rocket on a seaplane was like hitching an eagle to a plow."

Goddard's first biographer Milton Lehman notes:

In its 1942 crash effort to perfect an aircraft booster, the Navy was beginning to learn its way in rocketry. In similar efforts, the Army Air Corps was also exploring the field [with GALCIT]. Compared to Germany's massive program, these beginnings were small, yet essential to later progress. They helped develop a nucleus of trained American rocket engineers, the first of the new breed who would follow the professor into the Age of Space.

In August 1943, President Atwood at Clark wrote to Goddard that the university was losing the acting head of the physics department, was taking on "emergency work" for the army, and he was to "report for duty or declare the position vacant." Goddard replied that he believed he was needed by the navy, was nearing retirement age, and was unable to lecture because of his throat problem, which did not allow him to talk above a whisper. He regretfully resigned as professor of physics and expressed his deepest appreciation for all Atwood and the trustees had done for him and indirectly for the war effort. In June he had gone to see a throat specialist in Baltimore, who recommended that he not talk at all, to give his throat a rest.

The station, under Lt Commander Robert Truax, was developing another JATO engine in 1942 that used hypergolic propellants, eliminating the need for an ignition system. Chemist Ensign Ray Stiff had discovered in the literature in February that aniline and nitric acid burned fiercely immediately when mixed. Goddard's team built the pumps for the aniline fuel and the nitric acid oxidizer and participated in the static testing. The Navy delivered the pumps to Reaction Motors (RMI) to use in developing a gas generator for the pump turbines. Goddard went to RMI to observe testing of the pump system and would eat lunch with the RMI engineers. (RMI was the first firm formed to build rocket engines and built engines for the Bell X-1 rocket plane and Viking (rocket). RMI offered Goddard one-fifth interest in the company and a partnership after the war.) Goddard went with Navy people in December 1944 to confer with RMI on division of labor, and his team was to provide the propellant pump system for a rocket-powered interceptor because they had more experience with pumps. He consulted with RMI from 1942 through 1945. Though previously competitors, Goddard had a good working relationship with RMI, according to historian Frank H. Winter.

The Navy had Goddard build a pump system for Caltech's use with acid-aniline propellants. The team built a 3000-lb thrust engine using a cluster of four 750-lb thrust motors. They also developed 750-lb engines for the Navy's Gorgon guided interceptor missile (experimental Project Gorgon). Goddard continued to develop the variable-thrust engine with gasoline and lox because of the hazards involved with the hypergolics.

Despite Goddard's efforts to convince the Navy that liquid-fueled rockets had greater potential, he said that the Navy had no interest in long-range missiles. However, the Navy asked him to perfect the throttleable JATO engine. Goddard made improvements to the engine, and in November it was demonstrated to the Navy and some officials from Washington. Fischer invited the spectators to operate the controls; the engine blasted out over the Severn at full throttle with no hesitation, idled, and roared again at various thrust levels. The test was perfect, exceeding the Navy's requirements. The unit was able to be stopped and restarted, and it produced a medium thrust of 600 pounds for 15 seconds and a full thrust of 1,000 pounds for over 15 seconds. A Navy Commander commented that "It was like being Thor, playing with thunderbolts." Goddard had produced the essential propulsion control system of the rocket plane. The Goddards celebrated by attending the Army-Navy football game and attending the Fischers' cocktail party.

This engine was the basis of the Curtiss-Wright XLR25-CW-1 two-chamber, 15,000-pound variable-thrust engine that powered the Bell X-2 research rocket plane. After World War II, Goddard's team and some patents went to Curtiss-Wright Corporation. "Although his death in August 1945 prevented him from participating in the actual development of this engine, it was a direct descendent of his design." Clark University and the Guggenheim Foundation received the royalties from the use of the patents. In September 1956, the X-2 was the first plane to reach 126,000 feet altitude and in its last flight exceeded Mach 3 (3.2) before losing control and crashing. The X-2 program advanced technology in areas such as steel alloys and aerodynamics at high Mach numbers.

== The German V-2 ==
Don't you know about your own rocket pioneer? Dr. Goddard was ahead of us all.

— Wernher von Braun, when asked about his work, following World War II

In the spring of 1945, Goddard saw a captured German V-2 ballistic missile in the naval laboratory in Annapolis, Maryland, where he had been working under contract. The unlaunched rocket had been captured by the US Army from the Mittelwerk factory in the Harz mountains in Germany and samples began to be shipped by Special Mission V-2 on 22 May 1945.

After a thorough inspection, Goddard was convinced that the Germans had "stolen" his work. Though the design details were not exactly the same, the basic design of the V-2 was similar to one of Goddard's rockets. The V-2, however, was technically far more advanced than the most successful of the rockets designed and tested by Goddard. The Peenemünde rocket group led by Wernher von Braun may have benefited from the pre-1939 contacts to a limited extent, but had also started from the work of their own space pioneer, Hermann Oberth; they also had the benefit of intensive state funding, large-scale production facilities (using slave labor), and repeated flight-testing that allowed them to refine their designs. Oberth was a space flight theorist and had never built a rocket, but he tested small liquid propellant thrust chambers in 1929–30 which were not advances in the "state of the art". In 1922 Oberth asked Goddard for a copy of his 1919 paper and was sent one though Goddard was distrustful of the militaristic Germans. Later, Oberth erroneously believed that Goddard lacked vision, was interested only in studying the atmosphere, and did not comprehend the future of rocketry for space exploration.

Nevertheless, in 1963, von Braun, reflecting on the history of rocketry, said of Goddard: "His rockets ... may have been rather crude by present-day standards, but they blazed the trail and incorporated many features used in our most modern rockets and space vehicles". He once recalled that "Goddard's experiments in liquid fuel saved us years of work, and enabled us to perfect the V-2 years before it would have been possible." After World War II von Braun reviewed Goddard's patents and believed they contained enough technical information to build a large missile.

Three features developed by Goddard appeared in the V-2: (1) turbopumps were used to inject fuel into the combustion chamber; (2) gyroscopically controlled vanes in the nozzle exhaust stabilized the rocket until external vanes in the air could do so; and (3) excess alcohol was fed in around the combustion chamber walls, so that a blanket of evaporating gas protected the engine walls from the combustion heat.

The Germans had been watching Goddard's progress before the war and became convinced that large, liquid fuel rockets were feasible. General Walter Dornberger, head of the V-2 project, used the idea that they were in a race with the U.S. and that Goddard had "disappeared" (to work with the Navy) as a way to persuade Hitler to raise the priority of the V-2.

== Goddard's secrecy ==
Goddard avoided sharing details of his work with other scientists and preferred to work alone with his technicians. Frank Malina, who was then studying rocketry at the California Institute of Technology, visited Goddard in August 1936. Goddard hesitated to discuss any of his research, other than that which had already been published in Liquid-Propellant Rocket Development. He felt that Malina wanted to use his many years of effort for a Doctor's thesis. Theodore von Kármán, Malina's mentor at the time, was unhappy with Goddard's attitude and later wrote, "Naturally we at Caltech wanted as much information as we could get from Goddard for our mutual benefit. But Goddard believed in secrecy. ... The trouble with secrecy is that one can easily go in the wrong direction and never know it." However, at an earlier point, von Kármán said that Malina was "highly enthusiastic" after his visit and that Caltech made changes to their liquid-propellant rocket, based on Goddard's work and patents. Malina remembered his visit as friendly and that he saw all but a few components in Goddard's shop.

Goddard's concerns about secrecy led to criticism for failure to cooperate with other scientists and engineers. His approach at that time was that independent development of his ideas without interference would bring quicker results even though he received less technical support. George Sutton, who became a rocket scientist working with von Braun's team in the late 1940s, said that he and his fellow workers had not heard of Goddard or his contributions and that they would have saved time if they had known the details of his work. Sutton admits that it may have been their fault for not looking for Goddard's patents and depending on the German team for knowledge and guidance; he wrote that information about the patents was not well distributed in the U.S. at that early period after World War II, though Germany and the Soviet Union had copies of some of them. (The Patent Office did not release rocket patents during World War II.) However, the Aerojet Engineering Corporation, an offshoot of the Guggenheim Aeronautical Laboratory at Caltech (GALCIT), filed two patent applications in Sep 1943 referencing Goddard's U.S. patent 1,102,653 for the multistage rocket.

By 1939, von Kármán's GALCIT had received Army Air Corps funding to develop rockets to assist in aircraft take-off. Goddard learned of this in 1940, and openly expressed his displeasure at not being considered. Malina could not understand why the Army did not arrange for an exchange of information between Goddard and Caltech since both were under government contract at the same time. Goddard did not think he could be of that much help to Caltech because they were designing rocket engines mainly with solid fuel, while he was using liquid fuel. He notes that some students had found some empty solid fuel rockets from his research during World War I and wrote to ask what sort of gun powder he had used.

=== Criticism and Health ===
Goddard was concerned with avoiding the public criticism and ridicule he had faced in the 1920s, which he believed had harmed his professional reputation. He also lacked interest in discussions with people who had less understanding of rocketry than he did, feeling that his time was limited. Goddard's health was frequently poor, as a result of his earlier bout of tuberculosis, and he was uncertain about how long he had to live. He felt therefore that he hadn't the time to spare arguing with other scientists and the press about his new field of research, or helping all the amateur rocketeers who wrote to him. In 1932 Goddard wrote to H. G. Wells:

How many more years I shall be able to work on the problem, I do not know; I hope, as long as I live. There can be no thought of finishing, for "aiming at the stars", both literally and figuratively, is a problem to occupy generations, so that no matter how much progress one makes, there is always the thrill of just beginning.

Goddard spoke to professional groups, published articles and papers and patented his ideas; but while he discussed basic principles, he was unwilling to reveal the details of his designs until he had flown rockets to high altitudes and thus proven his theory. He tended to avoid any mention of space flight, and spoke only of high-altitude research, since he believed that other scientists regarded the subject as unscientific. GALCIT saw Goddard's publicity problems and that the word "rocket" was "of such bad repute" that they used the word "jet" in the name of JPL and the related Aerojet Engineering Corporation.

Many authors writing about Goddard mention his secrecy, but neglect the reasons for it. Some reasons have been noted above. Much of his work was for the military and was classified. There were some in the U.S. before World War II that called for long-range rockets, and in 1939 Major James Randolph wrote a "provocative article" advocating a 3000-mile range missile. Goddard was "annoyed" by the unclassified paper as he thought the subject of weapons should be "discussed in strict secrecy."

=== Cooperation ===
However, Goddard's tendency to secrecy was not absolute, nor was he totally uncooperative, especially when it came to the military. In 1945 GALCIT was building the WAC Corporal for the Army. But they were having trouble with their liquid propellant rocket engine's performance (timely, smooth ignition and explosions). Frank Malina went to Annapolis in February and consulted with Goddard and Stiff, and they arrived at a solution to the problem (hypergolic propellant: nitric acid and aniline), which resulted in the successful launch of the high-altitude research rocket in October 1945.

During the First and Second World Wars, Goddard offered his services, patents, and technology to the military, and made some significant contributions. Just before the Second World War several young Army officers and a few higher-ranking ones believed Goddard's research was important but were unable to generate funds for his work.

Toward the end of his life, Goddard, realizing he was no longer going to be able to make significant progress alone in his field, joined the American Rocket Society and became a director. He made plans to work in the budding US aerospace industry (with Curtiss-Wright), taking most of his team with him.

== Personal life ==
On June 21, 1924, Goddard married Esther Christine Kisk (March 31, 1901 – June 4, 1982), a secretary in Clark University's President's office, whom he had met in 1919. She became enthusiastic about rocketry and photographed and filmed some of his work as well as aided him in his experiments and paperwork, including accounting. They enjoyed going to the movies in Roswell and participated in community organizations such as the Rotary and the Woman's Club. He painted the New Mexican scenery, sometimes with the artist Peter Hurd, and played the piano. She played bridge, while he read. Esther said Robert participated in the community and readily accepted invitations to speak to church and service groups.

The couple did not have children. Not that they were disliked; Robert was like a godfather to the three sons of Sam Marshall, an oil geologist, and bought them fireworks on the Fourth of July.

Chronicler of the Southwest Paul Horgan was a friend. He perceived that Robert had "an overwhelming averageness, an almost Boy Scout conventionality.... But beneath this ordinariness you recognized some hidden and extraordinary sense of purpose.... What drove him, you came to understand, was some kind of vision into the future."

Concerning Goddard's religious views, he was raised as an Episcopalian, though he was not outwardly religious. The Goddards were associated with the Episcopal church in Roswell, and he attended occasionally. He once spoke to a young people's group on the relationship of science and religion.

Goddard's serious bout with tuberculosis weakened his lungs, affecting his ability to work, and was one reason he liked to work alone, in order to avoid argument and confrontation with others and use his time fruitfully. He labored with the prospect of a shorter than average life span. After arriving in Roswell, Goddard applied for life insurance, but when the company doctor examined him he said that Goddard belonged in a bed in Switzerland (where he could get the best care). Goddard's health began to deteriorate further after moving to the humid climate of Maryland to work for the Navy. He was diagnosed with throat cancer in 1945. He continued to work, able to speak only in a whisper until surgery was required, and he died in August of that year in Baltimore, Maryland. He was buried in Hope Cemetery in his home town of Worcester, Massachusetts.

After his death, Esther sorted and published Goddard's papers, and she secured 131 additional patents based on his work.

== Legacy ==
=== Influence ===
- Goddard was credited with 214 patents for his work; 131 of these were awarded after his death.
- Goddard influenced many people who went on to do significant work in the U.S. space program, such as Robert Truax (USN), Milton Rosen (Naval Research Laboratory and NASA), astronauts Buzz Aldrin and Jim Lovell, NASA flight controller Gene Kranz, astrodynamicist Samuel Herrick (UCLA), and General Jimmy Doolittle (US Army and NACA). Buzz Aldrin took a miniature sized biography of Goddard on his historic voyage to the Moon aboard Apollo 11.
- Goddard received the Langley Gold Medal from the Smithsonian Institution in 1960, and the Congressional Gold Medal on September 16, 1959.
- The Goddard Space Flight Center, a NASA facility in Greenbelt, Maryland, was established in 1959.
- The crater Goddard on the Moon is named in his honor.
- Esther Goddard ensured that Goddard's papers were housed in the Archives and Special Collections area of Clark University's Robert H. Goddard Library. This act influenced the historical research of Goddard's experiments.
- Robert H. Goddard High School was completed in 1965 in Roswell, New Mexico, and dedicated by Esther Goddard; the school's mascot is titled "Rockets".

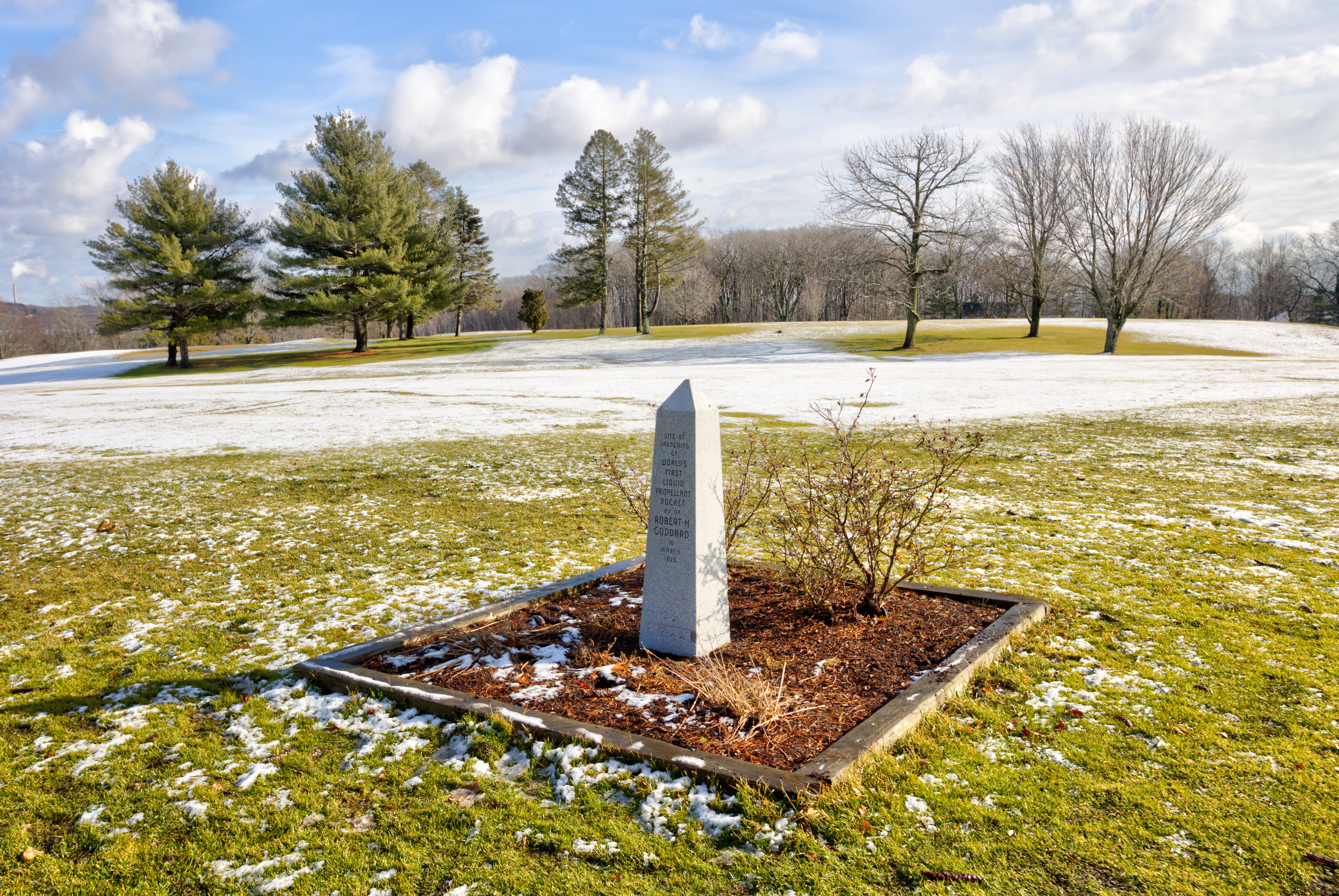
Obelisk marks the Goddard Rocket Launching Site

- The Goddard Rocket Launching Site in Auburn, Massachusetts, is a National Historic Landmark. The location was formerly the Asa Ward Farm, and is now a golf course.
- New Goddard prototype experimental reusable vertical launch and landing rocket from Blue Origin is named after Goddard.
- The Dr. Robert H. Goddard Award, also known as the Achievement 7 Award, is an award given to cadets of the Civil Air Patrol who reach the rank of Cadet Chief Master Sergeant. The promotion and the award are always given concurrently and in unison with one another.

=== In popular culture ===
- Children's author Isabel Hornibrook, in her novel Pemrose Lorry: Campfire Girl (Little, Brown and Company, 1921) claimed in the preface to have been the first to exploit Goddard's rocket as a plot device. In the last chapter, she wrote, "And never–oh! never since the history of Mother Earth and her satellite began did such a spectacular traveler start on such a flaming trip as when the hand of a Camp Fire Girl of America threw the switch and the steel explorer, twenty feet long, leaped from its platform high into the air, pointed directly for the moon, with a great inventor's mathematical precision,–trailing its two-hundred-foot, rosy trail of fire. There was not breath–not breath, even, to cry: "Watch it tear!"
- In F.L.A.S.H.!, episode 10 of season 11 of the Canadian television period drama Murdoch Mysteries (January 8, 2018), Goddard is played by Andrew Robinson and is described as a rocket scientist and chief scientist for a fictional pneumatic tube public transport system in early 1900s Toronto, Canada.
- Rocket, an American pale ale made by the Wormtown Brewery of Worcester, Massachusetts is named in Goddard's honor.
- In the Nickelodeon (TV Channel) series Jimmy Neutron Boy Genius Jimmy's robotic dog Goddard is named after him.
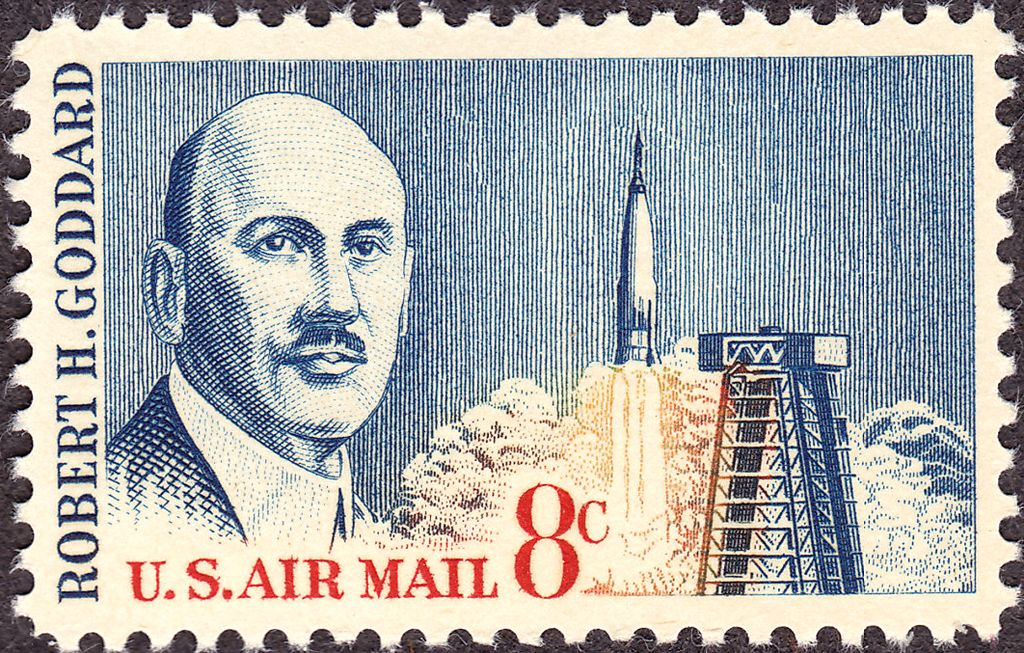
Goddard honored on a 1964 U.S. airmail stamp

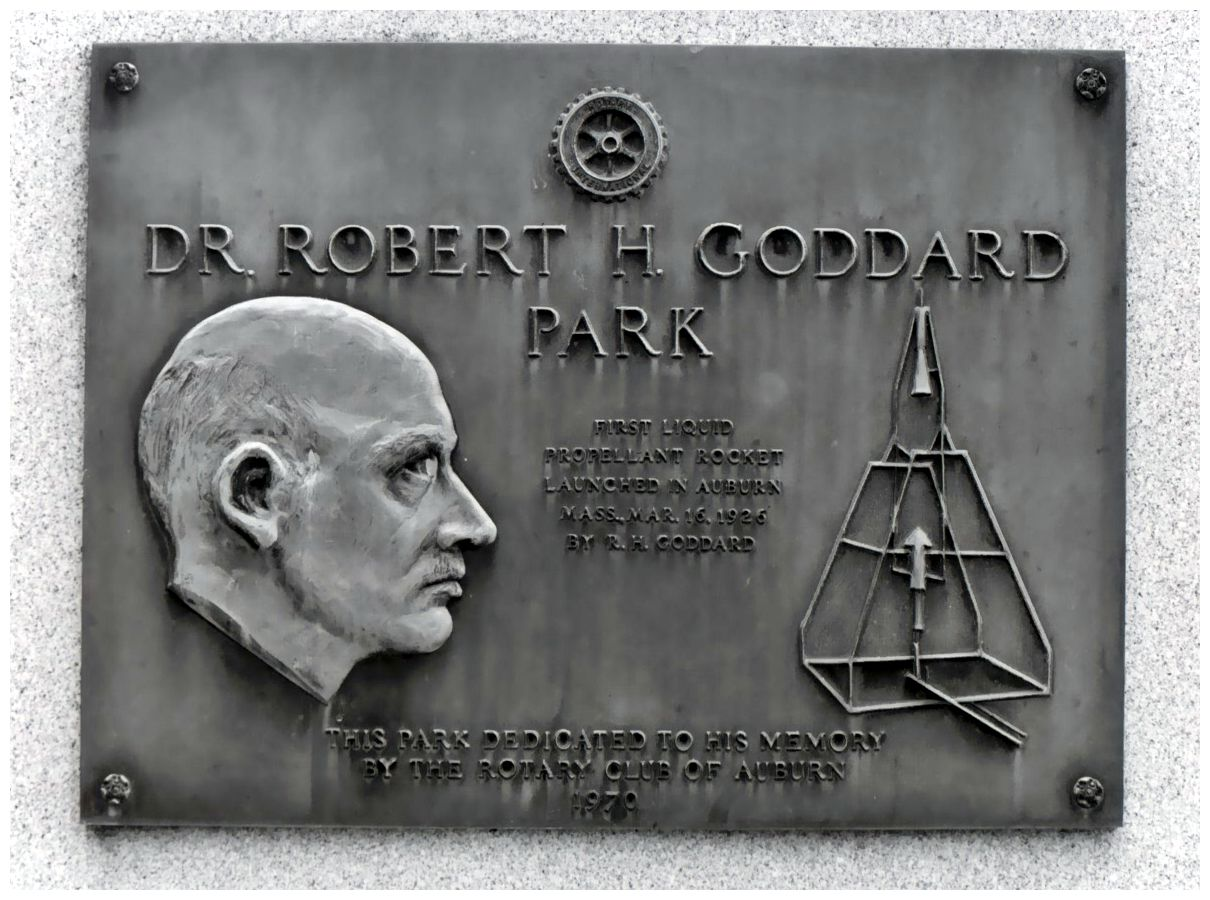
Bronze plaque in Auburn, Massachusetts marking the town in which Goddard launched the first liquid-fueled rocket on March 16, 1926.

Insignia of the 50th Anniversary of the Goddard Space Flight Center, a NASA facility in Maryland

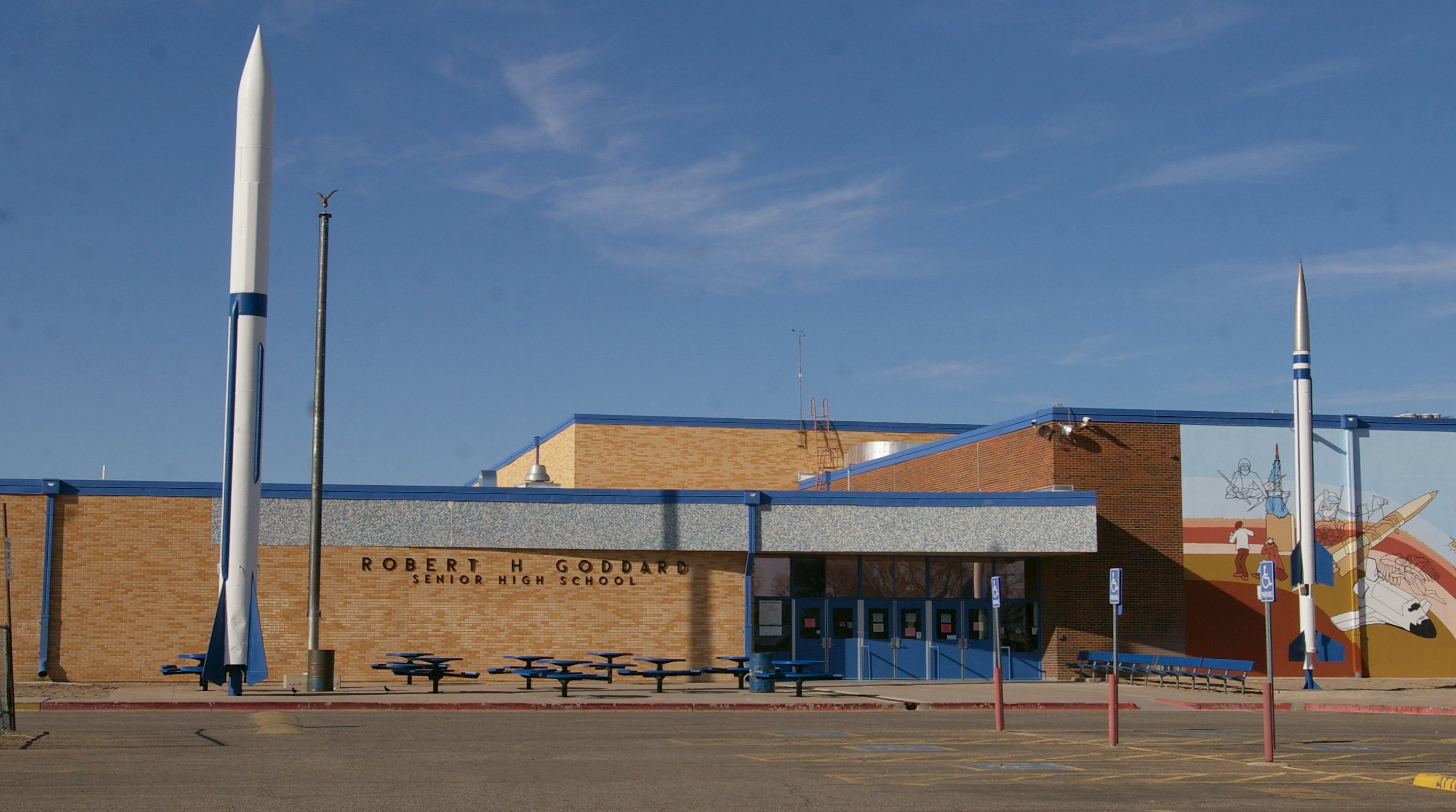
Robert H. Goddard High School in Roswell, New Mexico.

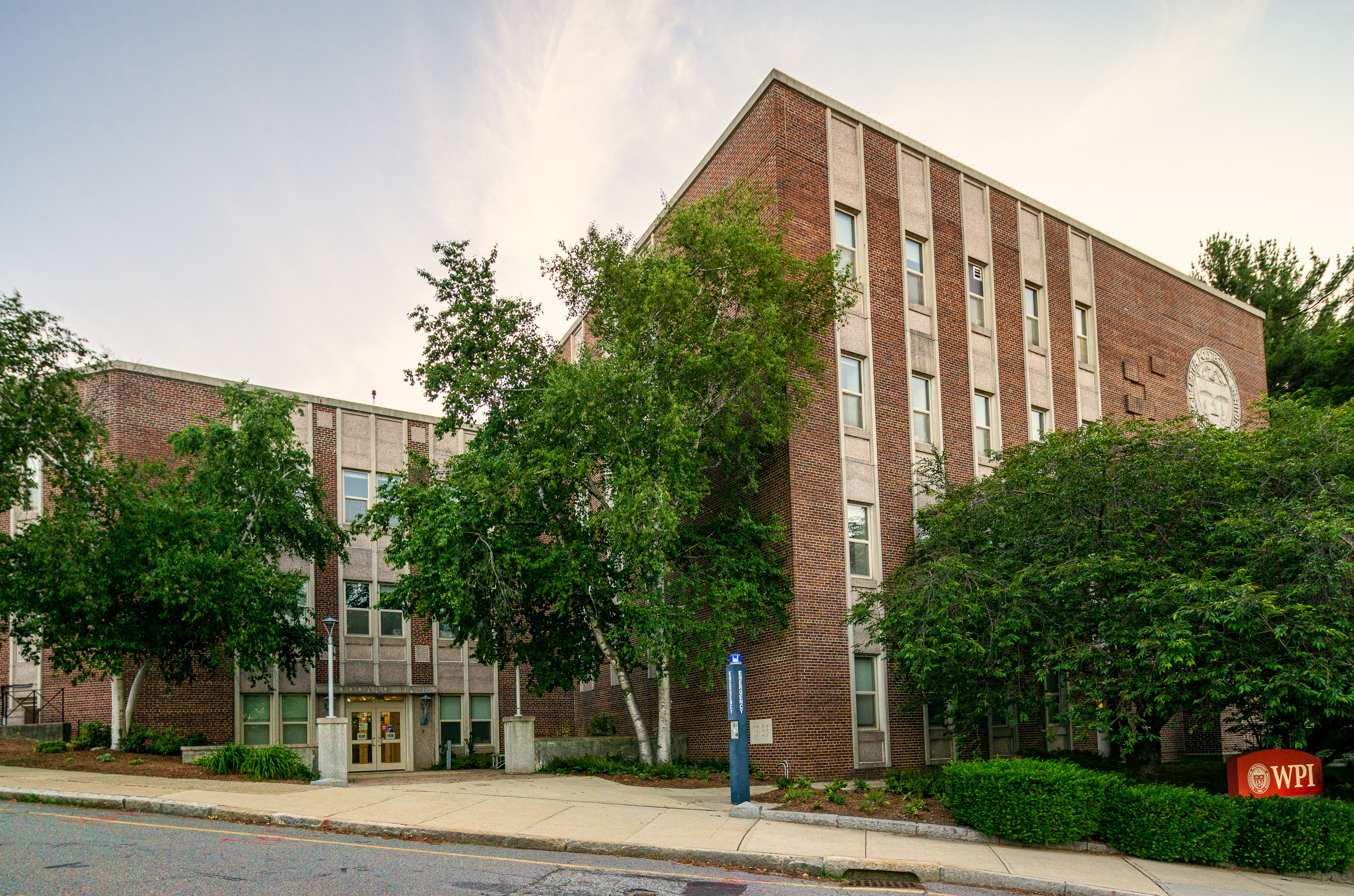
Goddard Hall at Worcester Polytechnic Institute

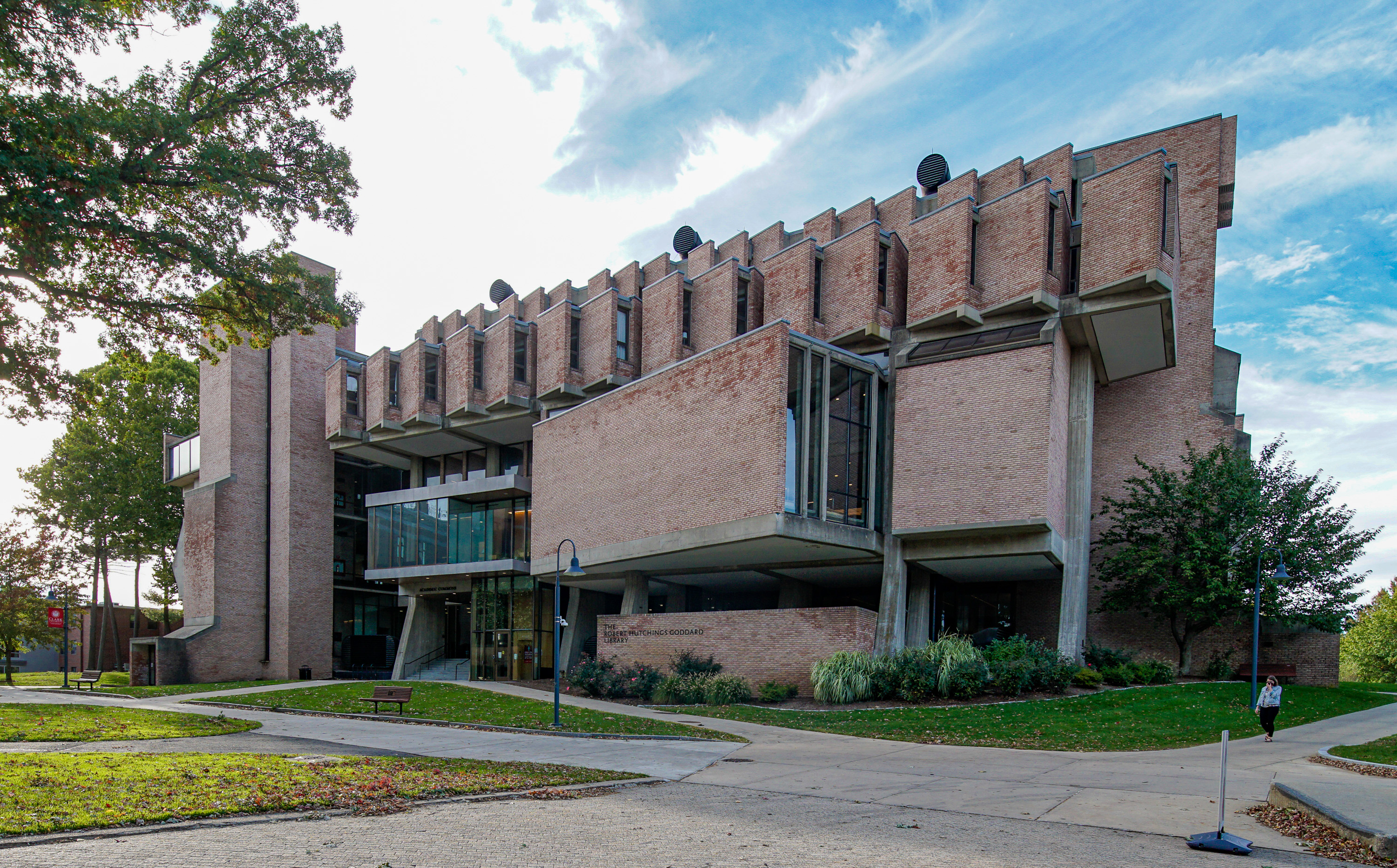
Goddard Library at Clark University

=== Patents of interest ===
Goddard received 214 patents for his work, of which 131 were awarded after his death. Among the most influential patents were:

- U.S. patent 1,102,653 – Rocket apparatus
- U.S. patent 1,103,503 – Rocket apparatus
- U.S. patent 2395113A – Mechanism for feeding combustion liquids to rocket apparatus
- U.S. patent 2397657A – Control mechanism for rocket apparatus
- U.S. patent 2397659A – Control mechanism for rocket apparatus
- U.S. patent 2511979A – Vacuum tube transportation system – E. C. Goddard

The Guggenheim Foundation and Goddard's estate filed suit in 1951 against the U.S. government for prior infringement of three of Goddard's patents. In 1960, the parties settled the suit, and the U.S. armed forces and NASA paid out an award of $1 million: half of the award settlement went to his wife, Esther. At that time, it was the largest government settlement ever paid in a patent case. The settlement amount exceeded the total amount of all the funding that Goddard received for his work, throughout his entire career.

=== Important firsts ===
- First American to explore mathematically the practicality of using rocket propulsion to reach high altitudes and to traject to the Moon (1912)
- First to receive a U.S. patent on the idea of a multistage rocket (1914)
- First to static test a rocket in a systematic, scientific manner, measuring thrust, exhaust velocity and efficiency. He obtained the highest efficiency of any heat engine at the time. (1915-1916)
- First to prove that rocket propulsion operates in a vacuum (which was doubted by some scientists of that time), that it needs no air to push against. He actually obtained a 20% increase in efficiency over that determined at ground-level atmospheric pressure (1915–1916).
- First to prove that an oxidizer and a fuel could be mixed using injectors and burned controllably in a combustion chamber, also doubted by physicists.
- First to develop suitable lightweight centrifugal pumps for liquid-fuel rockets and also gas generators to drive the pump turbine (1923).
- First to attach a DeLaval type of nozzle to the combustion chamber of a solid-fuel engine and increase efficiency by more than ten times. The exhaust flow became supersonic at the narrowest cross-sectional area (throat) of the nozzle.
- First to develop the liquid propellant feed system using a high-pressure gas to force the propellants from their tanks into the thrust chamber (1923).
- First to develop and successfully fly a liquid-propellant rocket (March 16, 1926)
- First to launch a scientific payload (a barometer, a thermometer, and a camera) in a rocket flight (1929)
- First to use vanes in the rocket engine exhaust for guidance (1932)
- First to develop gyroscopic control apparatus for guiding rocket flight (1932)
- First to launch and successfully guide a rocket with an engine pivoted by moving the tail section (as if on gimbals) controlled by a gyro mechanism (1937)
- Built lightweight propellant tanks out of thin sheets of steel and aluminum and used external high-strength steel wiring for reinforcement. He introduced baffles in the tanks to minimize sloshing which changed the center gravity of the vehicle. He used insulation on the very cold liquid-oxygen components.
- First in U.S. to design and test a variable-thrust rocket engine.
- First to fly a rocket with an engine having multiple (four) thrust chambers.
- First to test regenerative cooling of the thrust chamber in March 1923 (first suggested by Tsiolkovsky but unknown to Goddard).

== Bibliography ==
- A Method of Reaching Extreme Altitudes- Goddard 1919

== See also ==
- Homer Hickam
- Sergey Korolev
- Vikram Sarabhai
- U.S. space exploration history on U.S. stamps
