= National Register of Historic Places listings in Sevier County, Tennessee =

Location of Sevier County in Tennessee

This is a list of the National Register of Historic Places listings in Sevier County, Tennessee.

This is intended to be a complete list of the properties and districts on the National Register of Historic Places in Sevier County, Tennessee, United States. Latitude and longitude coordinates are provided for many National Register properties and districts; these locations may be seen together in a map.

There are 38 properties and districts listed on the National Register in the county. Two properties were once listed, but have since been removed.

Contents: Counties in Tennessee
Anderson – Bedford – Benton – Bledsoe – Blount – Bradley – Campbell – Cannon – Carroll – Carter – Cheatham – Chester – Claiborne – Clay – Cocke – Coffee – Crockett – Cumberland – Davidson – Decatur – DeKalb – Dickson – Dyer – Fayette – Fentress – Franklin – Gibson – Giles – Grainger – Greene – Grundy – Hamblen – Hamilton – Hancock – Hardeman – Hardin – Hawkins – Haywood – Henderson – Henry – Hickman – Houston – Humphreys – Jackson – Jefferson – Johnson – Knox – Lake – Lauderdale – Lawrence – Lewis – Lincoln – Loudon – Macon – Madison – Marion – Marshall – Maury – McMinn – McNairy – Meigs – Monroe – Montgomery – Moore – Morgan – Obion – Overton – Perry – Pickett – Polk – Putnam – Rhea – Roane – Robertson – Rutherford – Scott – Sequatchie – Sevier – Shelby – Smith – Stewart – Sullivan – Sumner – Tipton – Trousdale – Unicoi – Union – Van Buren – Warren – Washington – Wayne – Weakley – White – Williamson – Wilson

This National Park Service list is complete through NPS recent listings posted December 12, 2025.

== Current listings ==
	Name on the Register	Image	Date listed	Location	City or town	Description
1	Riley H. Andes House	Riley H. Andes House	July 8, 1980 (#80003854)	812 Old Douglas Dam Rd; 35°53′01″N 83°34′18″W	Sevierville	
2	Mayna Treanor Avent Studio	Mayna Treanor Avent Studio	February 7, 1994 (#93001575)	Jake's Creek Trail, 1 mile (1.6 km) south of Elkton; 35°38′21″N 83°35′15″W	Elkmont	
3	Brabson's Ferry Plantation	Brabson's Ferry Plantation	June 25, 1975 (#75001780)	1248 Indian Warpath Rd; 35°55′45″N 83°39′03″W	Sevierville vicinity	
4	Buckingham House	Buckingham House	March 18, 1971 (#71000831)	West of Sevierville on Sevierville Pike; 35°54′58″N 83°37′56″W	Sevierville vicinity	
5	Clingmans Dome Observation Tower	Clingmans Dome Observation Tower	August 15, 2012 (#12000515)	Terminus of Clingmans Dome Rd. 35°33′46″N 83°29′55″W	Gatlinburg vicinity	also listed in Swain County, North Carolina
6	Alex Cole Cabin	Alex Cole Cabin	January 2, 1976 (#76000165)	On the Roaring Fork Motor Nature Trail, 5 miles (8.0 km) south of Gatlinburg off U.S. Route 441 in Great Smoky Mountains National Park; 35°39′59″N 83°31′22″W	Gatlinburg vicinity	
7	Douglas Hydroelectric Project	Douglas Hydroelectric Project	August 14, 2017 (#100001475)	850 Powerhouse Way; 35°57′40″N 83°32′20″W	Dandridge vicinity	
8	Elkmont Historic District, Great Smoky Mountains NP	Elkmont Historic District, Great Smoky Mountains NP	March 22, 1994 (#94000166)	Off State Route 72 southwest of Gatlinburg; 35°39′20″N 83°35′04″W	Elkmont	
9	First Methodist Church, Gatlinburg	First Methodist Church, Gatlinburg	July 3, 2007 (#07000661)	742 Parkway; 35°42′41″N 83°31′02″W	Gatlinburg	
10	Harrisburg Covered Bridge	Harrisburg Covered Bridge	June 10, 1975 (#75001777)	South of Harrisburg off U.S. Route 411 over East Fork of the Little Pigeon River; 35°51′39″N 83°28′58″W	Harrisburg	
11	Headrick's Chapel	Headrick's Chapel	July 19, 2001 (#01000756)	4327 Wears Valley Rd; 35°42′00″N 83°40′47″W	Harchertown	
12	Keener-Johnson Farm		March 18, 1999 (#99000367)	1112 Boyd's Creek Highway; 35°53′16″N 83°43′47″W	Seymour	
13	King-Walker Place	King-Walker Place	March 16, 1976 (#76000169)	West of Gatlinburg off State Route 73 off the Little Brier Gap Trail in Great Smoky Mountains National Park; 35°41′39″N 83°37′45″W	Gatlinburg vicinity	
14	Little Greenbrier School-Church	Little Greenbrier School-Church	January 11, 1976 (#76000168)	About 9 miles (14 km) west of Gatlinburg off State Route 73 along the Metcalf Bottoms Trail in Great Smoky Mountains National Park; 35°41′01″N 83°38′17″W	Gatlinburg vicinity	
15	Tyson McCarter Place	Tyson McCarter Place	March 16, 1976 (#76000204)	10 miles (16 km) east of Gatlinburg on State Route 73 in Great Smoky Mountains National Park; 35°46′N 83°18′W	Gatlinburg vicinity	
16	Messer Barn	Messer Barn	January 1, 1976 (#76000166)	Southeast of Gatlinburg near Greenbrier Cove along the Brushy Mountain Trail in Great Smoky Mountains National Park; 35°41′13″N 83°23′54″W	Gatlinburg vicinity	
17	New Salem Baptist Church	New Salem Baptist Church	July 24, 2003 (#03000696)	601 Eastgate Rd. 35°51′32″N 83°33′14″W	Sevierville	Built in 1886 by African-American brick mason Isaac Dockery; part of the Rural African-American Churches in Tennessee Multiple Property Submission (MPS)
18	Bud Ogle Farm	Bud Ogle Farm	November 23, 1977 (#77000158)	On Cherokee Orchard Rd 3 miles (4.8 km) southeast of Gatlinburg in Great Smoky Mountains National Park; 35°40′50″N 83°29′28″W	Gatlinburg vicinity	
19	John Ownby Cabin	John Ownby Cabin	January 1, 1976 (#76000167)	On the Fighting Creek Nature Trail, 3 miles (4.8 km) south of Gatlinburg off State Route 73 in Great Smoky Mountains National Park; 35°41′22″N 83°32′50″W	Gatlinburg vicinity	
20	Perry's Camp	Perry's Camp	October 30, 1992 (#92000369)	101 Flat Branch Rd. 35°43′31″N 83°31′40″W	Gatlinburg vicinity	
21	Pigeon Forge Mill	Pigeon Forge Mill	June 10, 1975 (#75001778)	175 Old Mill Ave; 35°47′18″N 83°33′15″W	Pigeon Forge	
22	Pittman Community Center Home Economics Building	Pittman Community Center Home Economics Building	November 29, 1996 (#96001406)	2839 Webb Creek Rd. 35°45′30″N 83°23′44″W	Pittman Center	
23	Roaring Fork Historic District	Roaring Fork Historic District	March 16, 1976 (#76000170)	5 miles (8.0 km) southeast of Gatlinburg off State Route 73 in Great Smoky Mountains National Park; 35°41′54″N 83°28′04″W	Gatlinburg vicinity	
24	Rocky Springs Presbyterian Church		December 18, 2013 (#13000953)	2656 Boyds Creek Hwy. 35°55′23″N 83°39′43″W	Sevierville vicinity	
25	Rose Glen	Rose Glen	July 18, 1975 (#75001781)	1801 Old Newport Highway; 35°51′34″N 83°29′58″W	Sevierville	
26	Settlement School Community Outreach Historic District	Settlement School Community Outreach Historic District	July 11, 2007 (#07000686)	556 Parkway; 35°42′46″N 83°30′45″W	Gatlinburg	Comprises publicly accessible parts of the campus of the settlement school established by Pi Beta Phi that now houses the Arrowmont School of Arts and Crafts. Part of the Pi Beta Phi Settlement School MPS
27	Settlement School Dormitories and Dwellings Historic District	Settlement School Dormitories and Dwellings Historic District	March 20, 2007 (#07000185)	556 Parkway; 35°42′45″N 83°30′37″W	Gatlinburg	Comprises residential portions of the campus of the settlement school established by Pi Beta Phi that now houses the Arrowmont School of Arts and Crafts. Part of the Pi Beta Phi Settlement School MPS
28	Sevier County Courthouse	Sevier County Courthouse	March 24, 1971 (#71000832)	Court Ave. 35°52′04″N 83°33′58″W	Sevierville	
29	Sevierville Commercial Historic District	Sevierville Commercial Historic District	October 23, 1986 (#86002910)	Sections of Bruce St., Court Ave., and Commerce St. 35°52′05″N 83°33′57″W	Sevierville	
30	Shults Grove Methodist Church	Shults Grove Methodist Church	November 22, 2016 (#16000790)	505 Balls Hollow Rd E 35°47′02″N 83°17′47″W	Cosby vicinity	
31	Thomas Addition Historic District		March 17, 1994 (#94000197)	Roughly bounded by Park Rd., Belle Ave., Cedar St., Grace Ave., and Prince St. 35°51′39″N 83°33′38″W	Sevierville	
32	Trotter-McMahan House		October 10, 1975 (#75001783)	1848 Middle Creek Rd • Boundary increase (listed November 21, 2001, refnum 01001262): 1605 Middle Creek Rd. 35°49′49″N 83°32′22″W	Sevierville	
33	US Post Office-Sevierville	US Post Office-Sevierville	March 14, 1997 (#97000240)	167 Bruce St. 35°52′01″N 83°33′51″W	Sevierville	
34	Dwight and Kate Wade House	Dwight and Kate Wade House	December 15, 1997 (#97001502)	114 Joy St. 35°51′59″N 83°33′55″W	Sevierville	Built in 1940 by Fred McMahan, designed by New York architect Verna Cook Salomonsky
35	Walker Mill Hydroelectric Station	Walker Mill Hydroelectric Station	November 20, 1990 (#90001751)	West Prong of the Little Pigeon River just off U.S. Route 441; 35°50′44″N 83°34′08″W	Sevierville	part of the Pre-TVA Hydroelectric Power Development in Tennessee MPS
36	Waters House	Waters House	June 18, 1975 (#75001784)	217 Cedar St. 35°51′56″N 83°33′46″W	Sevierville	
37	Wheatlands	Wheatlands	July 7, 1975 (#75001785)	2507 TN-338; 35°55′07″N 83°40′06″W	Sevierville vicinity	

== Former listings ==
	Name on the Register	Image	Date listed	Date removed	Location	City or town	Description
1	Mountain View Hotel	Mountain View Hotel	September 13, 1984 (#84003681)	December 13, 1999	400 Parkway	Gatlinburg	Designed by Barber & McMurry; Demolished in March and April, 1993.
2	Sevierville Masonic Lodge		February 7, 1980 (#80003855)	April 12, 2022	119 Main St. 35°52′06″N 83°33′50″W	Sevierville	Demolished in 2006 for a parking lot.

== See also ==
- List of National Historic Landmarks in Tennessee
- National Register of Historic Places listings in Tennessee
