= Rose Glen =

Rose Glen may refer to:

- Rose Glen (Sevierville, Tennessee), an NRHP-listed antebellum plantation in Sevierville, Tennessee, US
- Rose Glen Elementary School, a school in Waukesha School District of Wisconsin, US
