= Buckingham House (Sevierville, Tennessee) =

Historic house in Tennessee, United States

- U.S. National Register of Historic Places
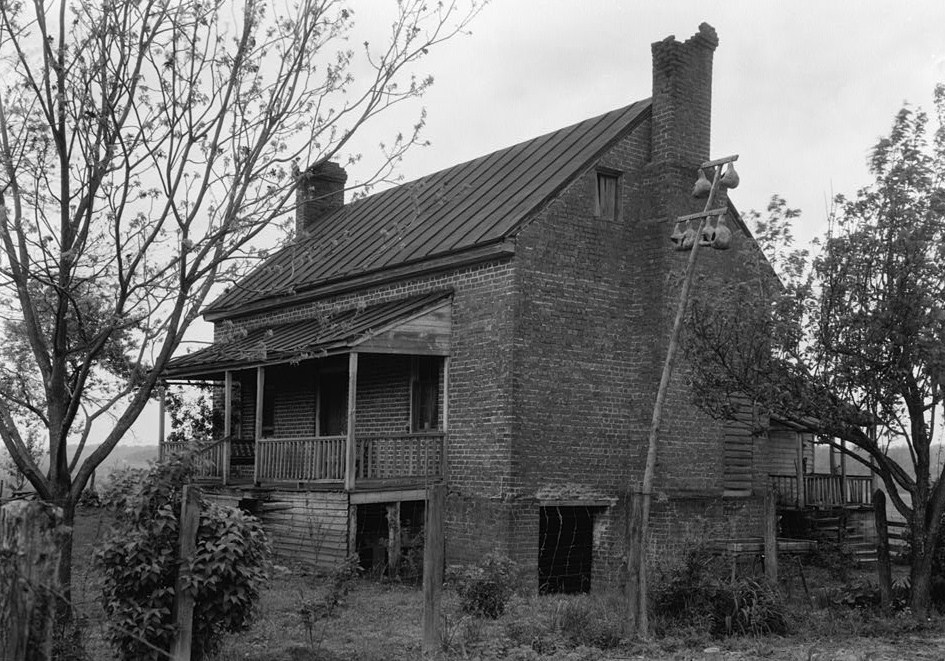
- The Buckingham House in 1934

- Location within Tennessee
- Nearest city: Sevierville, Tennessee
- Coordinates: 35°54′58″N 83°37′56″W
- Area: 10 acres (4.0 ha)
- Built: 1796
- Built by: Buckingham, Thomas; Buckingham, Ephriam
- Architectural style: Federal
- NRHP reference No.: 71000831
- Added to NRHP: March 18, 1971

The Buckingham House is a historic brick house near Sevierville, Tennessee, United States. Built in 1796 by Thomas Buckingham, the first sheriff of Sevier County, Tennessee, it is the oldest house in the county. The house was designed in the Federal architectural style and is listed on the National Register of Historic Places.

== History ==
The land was home to Cherokee people until European settlers, led by John Sevier, forced them off the land between 1776 and 1785. Thomas Buckingham subsequently purchased the land from Sevier and served as the first sheriff of Sevier County, Tennessee.

Buckingham and his brother Ephriam built the Buckingham House in 1796. The house, which overlooks the French Broad River, was designed in the Federal architectural style. An ell, with two rooms and a porch, was added to the house by 1890.

The house was listed on the National Register of Historic Places on March 18, 1971.

== See also ==
- List of the oldest buildings in Tennessee
