= Reese Bowen Brabson =

American politician (1817–1863)

Member of the U.S. House of Representatives from Tennessee's 3rd district
- In office March 4, 1859 – March 4, 1861
- Preceded by: Samuel A. Smith
- Succeeded by: George W. Bridges

Member of the Tennessee House of Representatives
- In office 1851-1852

Personal details
- Born: September 16, 1817 Sevier County, Tennessee, US
- Died: August 16, 1863 (aged 45) Chattanooga, Tennessee, US
- Party: Whig; Know Nothing (1856); Opposition (1859–1861)
- Spouse: Sarah Maria Keith Cleary Brabson
- Relations: Robert H. Hodsden (brother-in-law); Charles K. Bell (nephew)
- Children: John Bowen Brabson, Ada Elizabeth Brabson Colburn, Maria Marshall Brabson, Catherine Douglass Brabson Waggener, Mary Brabson, Rose Brabson
- Education: Maryville College
- Profession: Attorney, farmer

Reese Bowen Brabson (September 16, 1817 – August 16, 1863) was an American politician who represented Tennessee's 3rd district in the United States House of Representatives from 1859 to 1861. He also served one term in the Tennessee House of Representatives, from 1851 to 1852. Brabson opposed secession, and took no active part in the Civil War.

== Life and career ==
Brabson was born at Brabson's Ferry Plantation near Sevierville on September 16, 1817. He graduated from Maryville College in Maryville, Tennessee in 1840, studied law in Dandridge, and was admitted to the bar in 1848. He commenced practice of law in Chattanooga, Tennessee, in partnership with James A. Whiteside.

Brabson was an elector for presidential candidate Zachary Taylor in 1848. He represented Hamilton County in the Tennessee House of Representatives for the 29th Tennessee General Assembly (1851–1852).

In 1856, he ran for United States Congress for Tennessee's 3rd congressional district on the Know Nothing ticket, but ultimately lost the election to the incumbent Samuel Axley Smith.

Brabson was elected as a member of the Opposition Party to the Thirty-sixth Congress, serving from March 4, 1859, to March 3, 1861. He was not a candidate for renomination in 1860. During the presidential campaign of 1860, Brabson canvassed for the Constitutional Union candidate, John Bell.

Although a slaveholder, Brabson opposed secession on the eve of the Civil War. When Tennessee seceded in June 1861, he returned to his residence at Chattanooga, refusing to take up arms against either side, though offered a commission by both. As a lawyer, he defended James J. Andrews, a Union operative facing court-martial for leading the raid known as the Great Locomotive Chase in 1862. But he also opened his home to the wounded Confederate casualties following the Battle of Stones River in early 1863.

Brabson succumbed to typhoid on August 16, 1863. He was interred in the Citizens Cemetery in Chattanooga.

== Family and legacy ==
Brabson married Sarah Maria Keith, daughter of Judge Charles F. and Elizabeth D. (Hale) Keith, of McMinn County. The couple had six children, John Bowen, Ada Elizabeth, Maria Marshall, Catherine Douglass, Mary, and Rose. Brabson was the uncle of Charles K. Bell, a U.S. Representative from Texas.

Brabson's home, though extensively altered, still stands on East Fifth Street in Chattanooga. The plantation where he was raised, Brabson's Ferry Plantation, still stands near Sevierville and is listed on the National Register of Historic Places.

U.S. House of Representatives
| Preceded by Samuel A. Smith | Member of the U.S. House of Representatives from Tennessee's 3rd congressional district 1859–1861 | Succeeded by Vacant |
