= Riley H. Andes House =

Historic house in Tennessee, United States

- U.S. National Register of Historic Places
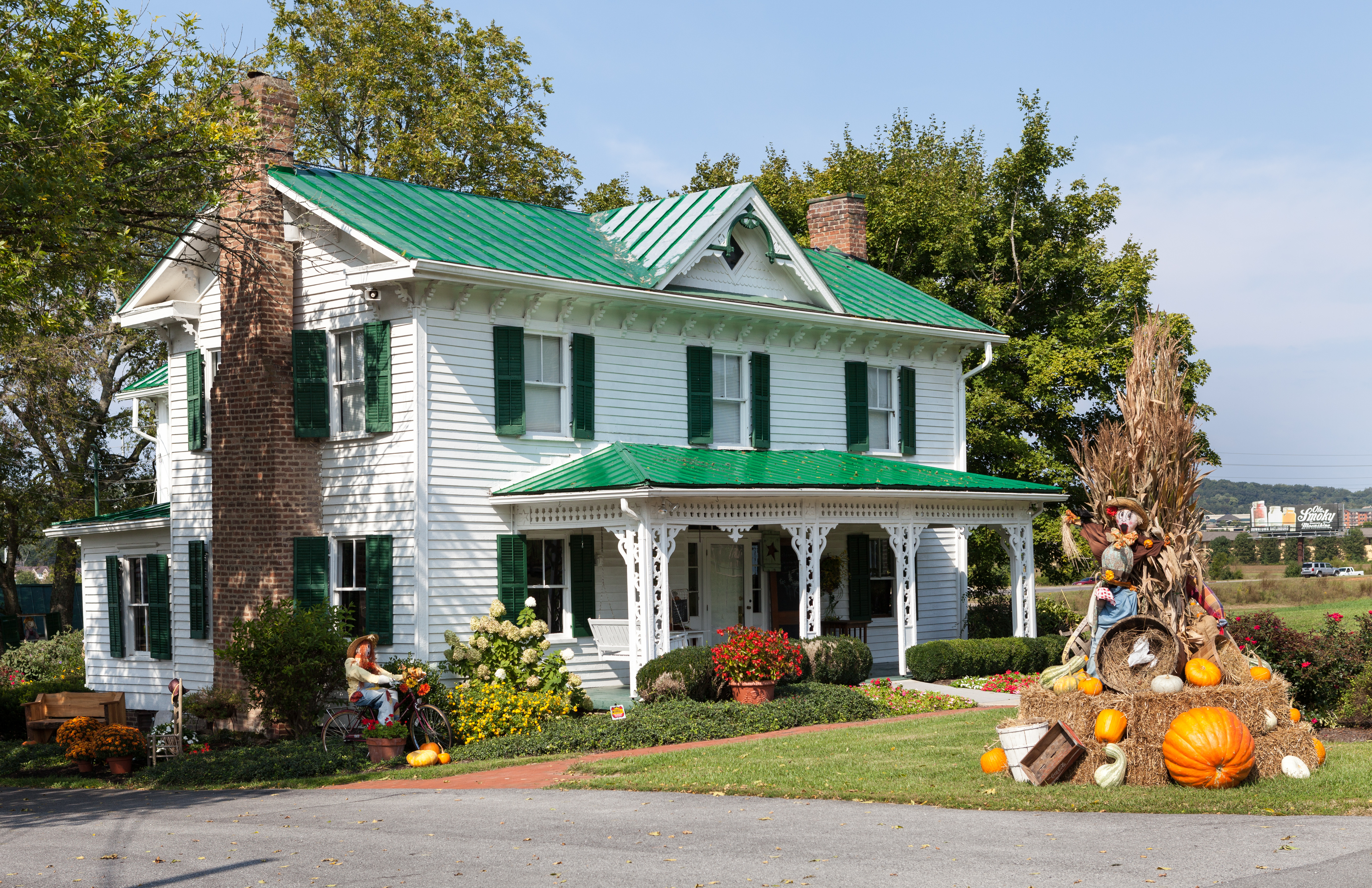
- The Riley H. Andes House in 2014

- Location within Tennessee
- Location: Douglas Dam Road, Sevierville, Tennessee
- Coordinates: 35°53′1″N 83°34′18″W
- Area: 1 acre (0.40 ha)
- Built: 1867
- Built by: Lewis Buckner
- Architectural style: Vernacular Victorian
- NRHP reference No.: 80003854
- Added to NRHP: July 8, 1980

The Riley H. Andes House is a historic house in Sevierville, Tennessee, United States.

== History ==
The house was built in 1867 for Riley H. Andes, his wife, Rebecca Rimel, and their daughter Sallie. The Italianate and Queen Anne woodcarving was designed by Lewis Buckner, an African-American carpenter, in 1890. After Riley Andes's death in 1917, their daughter Sallie, who was married to J. W. Trotter, rented the house, until she sold it to John Denton in 1942. It is now home to the Robert A. Tino Gallery, named after a local painter.

The house has been listed on the National Register of Historic Places since July 8, 1980.
