= Robert H. Hodsden =

American physician and politician (1806 – 1864)

Member of the Tennessee House of Representatives from Blount County
- In office October 4, 1841 – October 5, 1845
- Preceded by: David McKamy
- Succeeded by: D.W. Tedford

Member of the Tennessee House of Representatives from Knox and Sevier counties
- In office October 7, 1861 – February 1862
- Preceded by: James S. Boyd
- Succeeded by: Samuel McCammon

Personal details
- Born: November 23, 1806 Smithfield, Virginia, U.S.
- Died: June 18, 1864 (aged 57) Sevier County, Tennessee, U.S.
- Resting place: Brabson Cemetery; Sevier County, Tennessee
- Party: Whig
- Spouse: Mary Reese Brabson
- Relations: Reese Bowen Brabson (brother-in-law)
- Education: Jefferson Medical College
- Profession: Physician

Robert Hatton Hodsden (November 23, 1806 – June 18, 1864) was an American medical doctor, planter, and politician who served three terms in the Tennessee House of Representatives (1841–1845, 1861–1862). He worked as a government medical doctor on the Cherokee removal ("Trail of Tears") in 1838, and served as president of the East Tennessee Medical Society in the mid-1850s. A Southern Unionist during the Civil War, Hodsden represented Sevier County at the East Tennessee Convention in 1861, and was later arrested by Confederate authorities.

Hodsden's 1840s-era house, Rose Glen, still stands near Sevierville, and is listed on the National Register of Historic Places.

== Early life ==
Hodsden was born in Smithfield, Virginia, the son of Joseph and Mary (Pasteur) Hodsden. He attended common schools and an academy at Smithfield, and afterward began working as a tailor. In the late 1820s, he left Virginia due to what was described as "misfortune in a business transaction." He lived in Washington, D.C., Cincinnati, and Nashville, before settling in Rhea County, Tennessee, in 1830. That year, he began studying medicine with Rhea County physician John Hoyl. He afterward attended Jefferson Medical College in Philadelphia.

In the Fall of 1833, Hodsden moved to Maryville, Tennessee, where he began practicing medicine in partnership with Dr. James Gillespie. In 1838, Hodsden worked as a government physician on the Trail of Tears, the operation in which the Cherokee were removed from their homelands in the southeastern United States to Oklahoma. Hodsden made two trips during the operation, the first from Ross Landing (Chattanooga) to Arkansas, and the second from Charleston, Tennessee, to Arkansas.

A Whig and supporter of Henry Clay, Hodsden was elected to Blount County's seat in the Tennessee House of Representatives in 1841, and was reelected in 1843. He was appointed to the Committee on Public Lands, the Committee on Agriculture and Manufactures, and the Committee on Banks. Bills he introduced included support for improvements along Little River in Blount County, and amendments to tax collection laws.

In 1843, Hodsden married Mary Reese Brabson Shields, the widow of David Shields. He moved to the Harrisburg community in Sevier County and established a plantation, Rose Glen, on land his wife had inherited. In 1850, he organized a masons lodge in nearby Sevierville, the Mountain Star Lodge, and was elected its first Worshipful Master. Over the next few years, Hodsden was appointed to the state agricultural bureau, and served as president of the East Tennessee Fair. In 1857, he was elected president of the East Tennessee Medical Society, and delivered an address, "On the Advancement of the Profession of Medicine," at the group's convention the following year. By 1860, Hodsden was one of the wealthiest men in Sevier County, with over $50,000 (~$1.42 million in 2024) in assets.

== Civil War ==
Though a slave owner, Hodsden, like many of East Tennessee's pre-war Whigs, remained loyal to the Union during the Civil War. His family was divided over the issue, however, with his inlaws, the Brabsons, being among Sevier County's staunchest Confederates. In June 1861, Hodsden attended the Greeneville session of the East Tennessee Convention as a member of the Sevier County delegation. This convention attempted, unsuccessfully, to form a Union-aligned state in East Tennessee.

In August 1861, Hodsden was again elected to the Tennessee House of Representatives, this time representing a floterial district consisting of Sevier and Knox counties. He was forced to take the Confederate oath of allegiance in order to remain in the legislature, though he continued working for Unionist causes. In October 1861, he sent a letter to Unionist attorney Oliver Perry Temple, warning him that Temple and their friends William "Parson" Brownlow, Connally Trigg, and John Williams were about to be indicted. In November 1861, Hodsden delivered a speech in Sevierville in which he noted he had only taken the oath to the provisional Confederate government, and proclaimed that he was a "stronger Union man today than ever." He stated he was using his position in the legislature to prevent Confederate "mischief" and lobby for the release of jailed Unionists. He also suggested the Confederate Army was on the run, and that the Confederacy would soon fall.

Amid the Confederate crackdown during the weeks following the East Tennessee bridge burnings, Hodsden was arrested and charged with treason in December 1861. John M. Fleming, a fellow Unionist state legislator, was charged with harboring him. He agreed to pay a $10,000 bond and court costs in January 1862, and the district attorney in return agreed not to prosecute the case. Confederate judge West Hughes Humphreys subsequently found no wrongdoing on the part of Hodsden or Fleming.

Hodsden died at his home, Rose Glen, on June 18, 1864, presumably of heart disease. He is buried with his wife and children at the Brabson Cemetery near Sevierville.

== Family and legacy ==
Hodsden and his wife, Mary, had six children: Priscilla Katurah, Virginia, David Shields, Penelope Brabson, John Brabson, and Mary Pasteur. His brother-in-law, Reese Bowen Brabson, served one term in Congress (1859–1861), representing the 3rd district.

Hodsden's home, Rose Glen, still stands near Sevierville, and is still owned and maintained by his descendants. It was listed on the National Register of Historic Places in 1975. Along with the 1840s-era Greek Revival house, the site includes several outbuildings, including Hodsden's office. Brabson's Ferry Plantation, the home of Hodsden's inlaws, is also still standing, and has been designated a Tennessee Century Farm.

== See also ==
- Alfred Cate
- Charles Inman
