= Brabson's Ferry Plantation =

Historic house in Tennessee, United States

- U.S. National Register of Historic Places
- U.S. Historic district
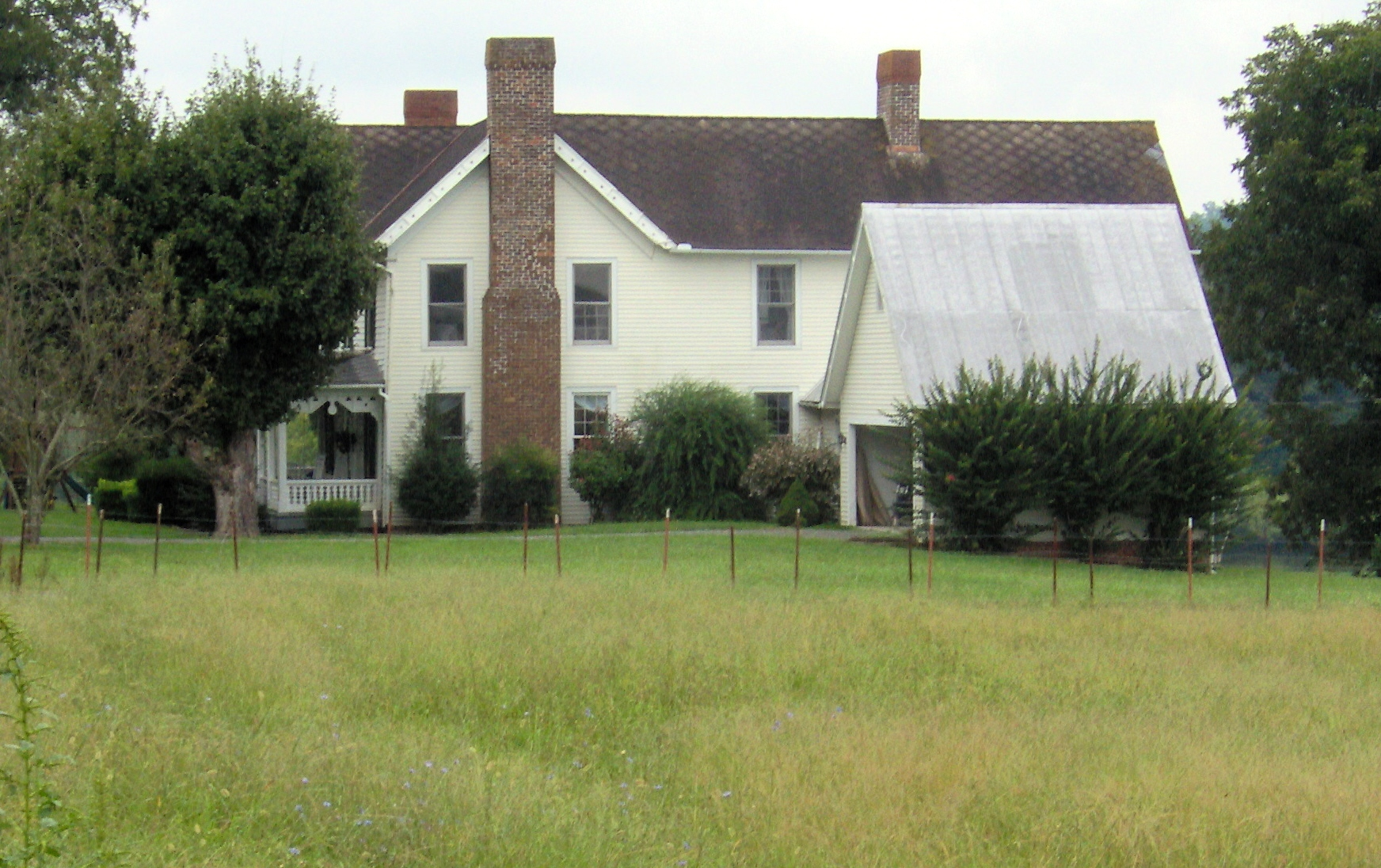
- Benjamin Brabson house

- Location within Tennessee Location within the United States
- Location: NW of Sevierville off Sevierville Pike in area of Boyd's Creek
- Coordinates: 35°55′45″N 83°39′3″W
- Area: 250 acres (100 ha)
- Built: 1790s
- NRHP reference No.: 75001780
- Added to NRHP: June 25, 1975 (51 years ago)

Brabson's Ferry Plantation is a Pioneer Century farm and former antebellum plantation near Sevierville, Tennessee. Located at what was once a strategic crossing of the French Broad River, by 1860 the plantation had become one of the largest in East Tennessee and one of the few in the region that rivalled the large plantations of the Deep South in size and influence. The farm remains in operation, and several of its structures—including two plantation houses and an 18th-century plank house—have been added to the National Register of Historic Places.

John Brabson II (1773–1848) established Brabson's Ferry Plantation after purchasing the plantation's namesake ferry in 1798, and he acquired the surrounding fertile farmland over subsequent decades. Brabson's sons continued operating the plantation after his death and established a business that catered to the ferry's traffic. As the Brabsons supported the Confederacy during the U.S. Civil War, their plantation was looted by Sevier County Unionists, and toward the end of the war most members of the family were forced to flee. Several eventually returned, however, and by the end of the 19th century they had rebuilt the plantation and ferry. The Brabson family still owns and manages the farm.

== Location ==
Brabson's Ferry Plantation is located at the confluence of Boyds Creek and the French Broad River in the Boyds Creek community a few miles northwest of Sevierville. Tennessee State Route 338 (Boyds Creek Highway) passes along the plantation's southern boundary, and Indian Warpath Road traverses its western section. The Brabson Cemetery is located on the north end of the plantation.

== History ==
State Route 338 follows what was once a stretch of the Great Indian Warpath, a trail used for centuries by Native Americans travelling up and down the Tennessee Valley. The ancient path crossed the French Broad River at a ford near the mouth of Boyds Creek. In 1780, John Sevier crossed at this ford to engage and defeat a Cherokee force at the Battle of Boyds Creek. In the 1790s, pioneer Andrew Evans established a ferry and a 250-acre (100 ha) farm at the Boyds Creek ford. John Brabson, who migrated to the area from Frederick County, Virginia, purchased the Evans farm and ferry in 1798.

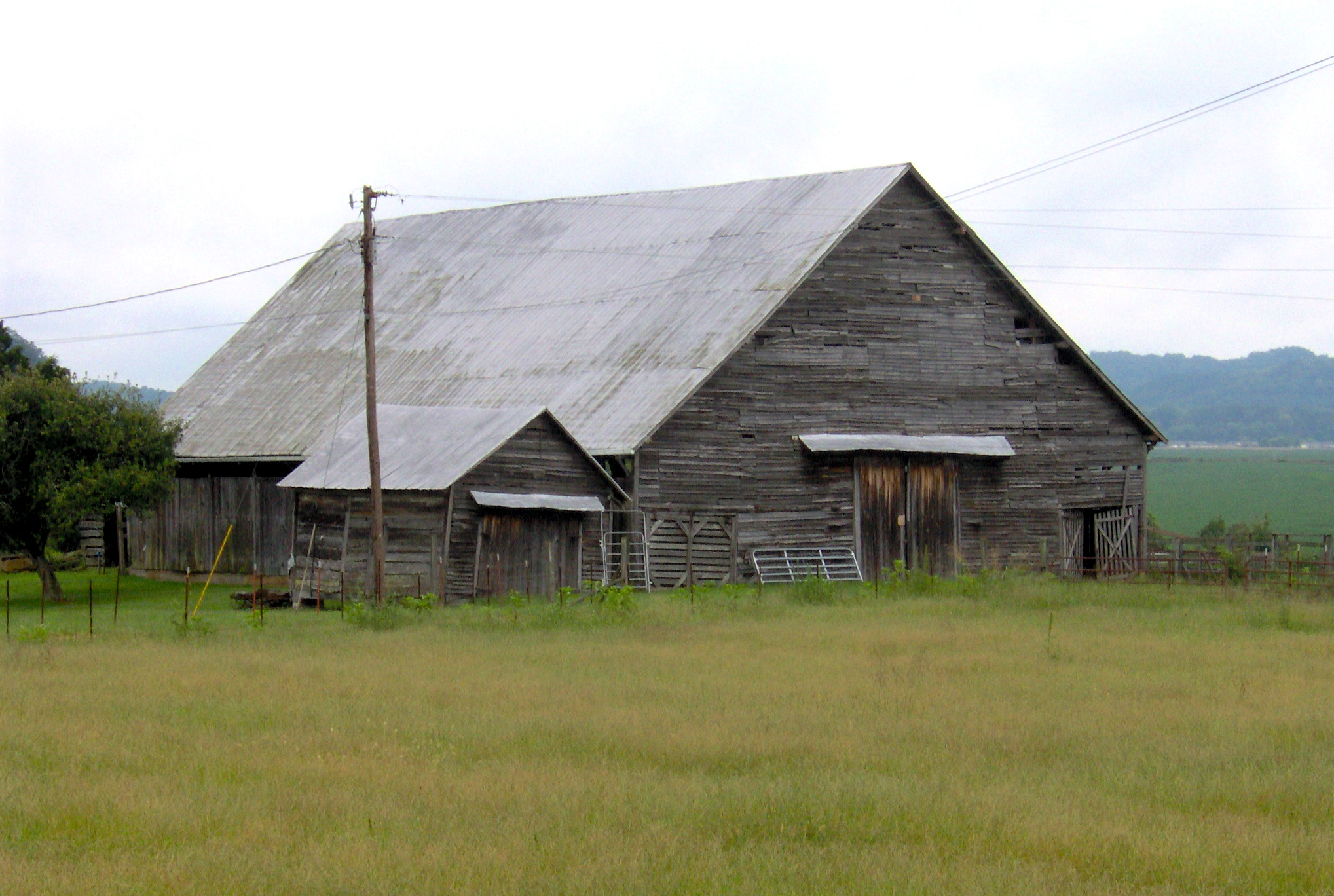
Brabson plank house (left) and barn

Brabson continued acquiring land in the early 19th century. By the time of his death in 1848, he owned 5,000 acres (2,000 ha), making him one of the largest landholders in East Tennessee. He was also one of the region's largest slaveholders, with 49 slaves, most of whom were split up among his children (Brabson's will emancipated only one elderly slave). One of Brabson's sons, Reese Bowen Brabson (1817–1863), moved to Chattanooga in 1848 and was elected to the U.S. Congress in 1858. John Brabson's daughter Mary and son-in-law Robert H. Hodsden established the Rose Glen plantation in the 1840s just east of Sevierville. Brabson's two eldest surviving sons, Benjamin (1809–1866) and Thomas (1813–1894), inherited most of Brabson's Ferry Plantation. Benjamin and Thomas built more elaborate houses (in 1856 and 1854, respectively), and in 1852 established a company, Brabson and Brother, that operated a general store, tannery, blacksmith shop, gristmill, and stagecoach stop for local farmers and stagecoach traffic using the family's ferry.

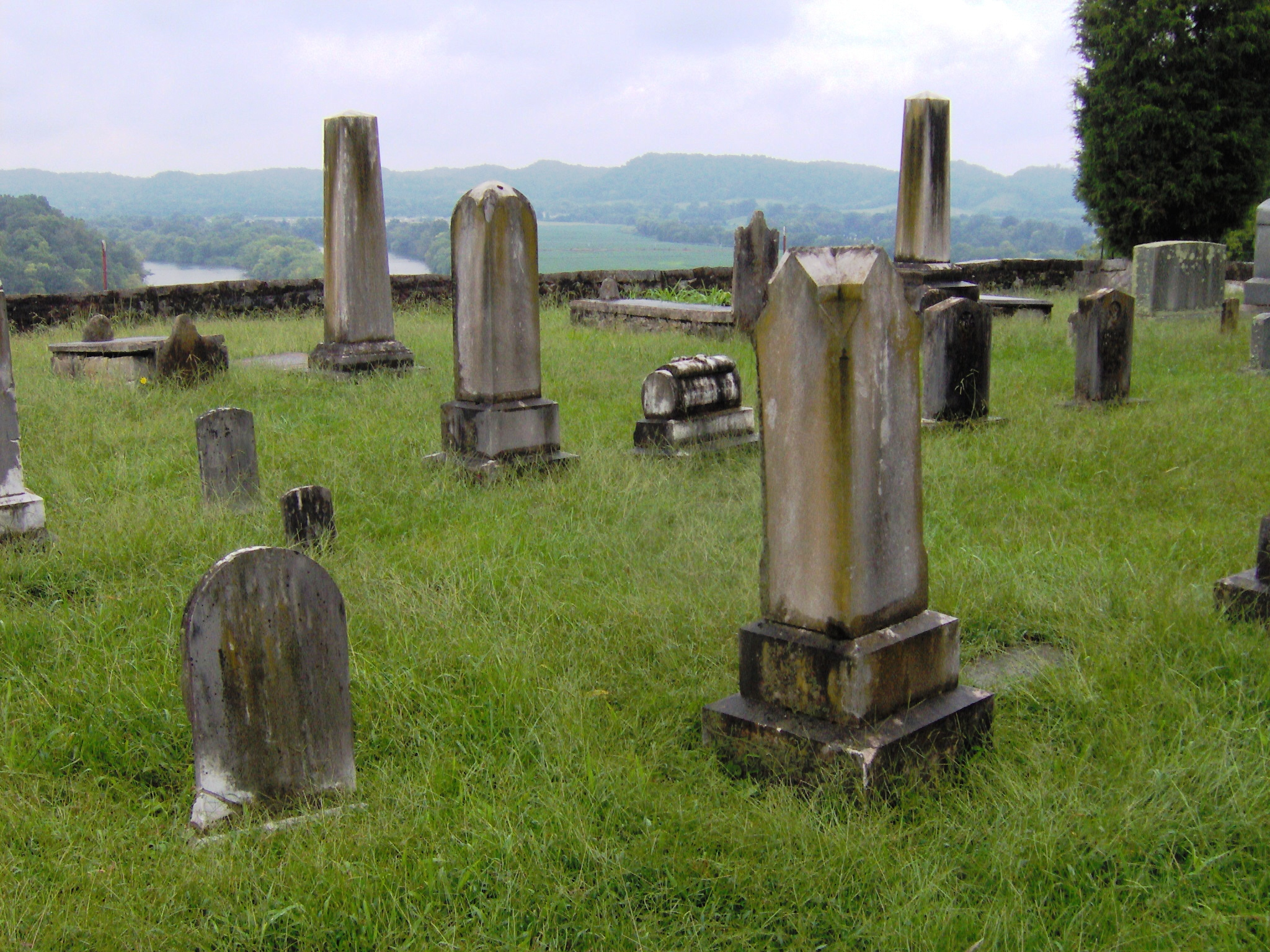
Brabson Cemetery

While most of Sevier County supported the Union during the American Civil War (96% of the county voted against secession in 1861), the Brabsons supported the Confederacy. Benjamin's son William enlisted in the Confederate States Army and in 1863 was captured by the Union Army while fighting near Muscle Shoals, Alabama. Toward the end of the war, as Union forces re-gained control of East Tennessee, vengeful Sevier Countians began harassing and threatening the Brabsons. Most of the family's livestock were stolen, the plantation houses were looted, and family members were forced to flee. In an October 1865 letter, Benjamin's wife Elizabeth (1821–1894) wrote "they rocked my house so, burned my carriage, and fired my outbuildings, they also shot at me several times." Thomas and his wife moved to Knoxville, where there had been more sympathy for the Confederacy. Benjamin moved to Winchester, Tennessee, writing in 1865 that his future looked "dark." He died a few months later and according to his wishes was buried in Winchester rather than the family cemetery in Boyds Creek.

After Benjamin's death, his family returned to Sevier County and began rebuilding the family's plantation, largely through the efforts of William. Benjamin's son John Brabson IV (1858–1943) assumed ownership of the plantation after his mother's death and made several modifications to the house. By 1900, Brabson's Ferry had again become a major center of local commerce. After the death of John, his son Benjamin Davis Brabson III (1905-1982) and his wife Estalena Rogers Brabson (1912-1989), took over ownership and operation of the farm until Benjamin's death in 1982. Estalena maintained an enthusiastic interest in genealogy and family history and published several books including John Brabson I, Patriot of the American Revolution And Some of His Descendants (1975) which chronicles the origins of Brabson's Ferry Plantation. Estalena was responsible for placing Brabson's Ferry Plantation on the U.S. National Register of Historic Places in 1975.

The farm was managed by Benjamin Brabson's great-grandson Ben D. Brabson, Jr., and his wife Elaine, and in 2008 it was designated a Tennessee Pioneer Century Farm. The Brabson farm produces beef cattle, wheat, oats, corn, hay, and soybeans. The Brabson Farm is managed by Ben and Elaine Brabson's son Benjamin Davis Brabson III and wife Lucinda Ann Brabson as of 2021.

== Structures ==
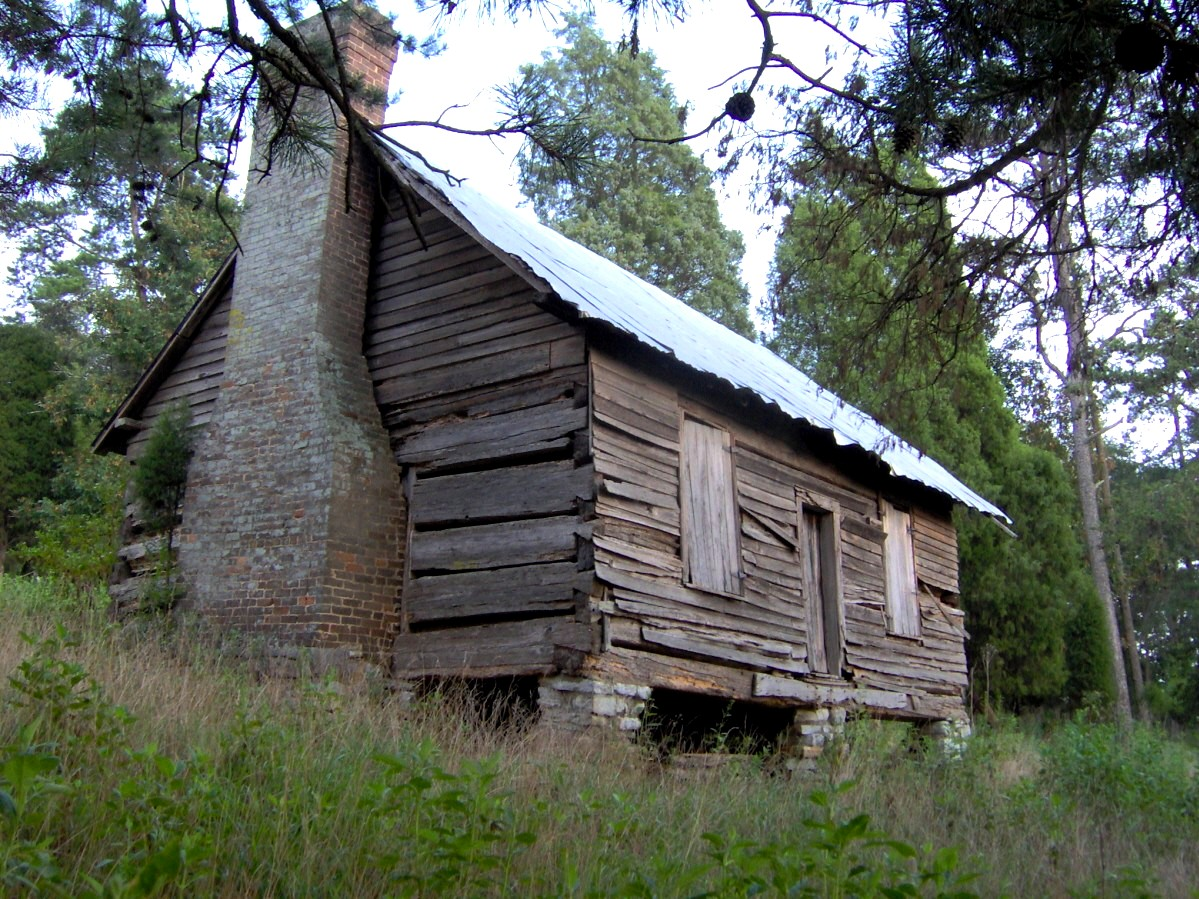
Log cabin near the Brabson Cemetery

The plantation contains several notable antebellum structures, including both the Benjamin Brabson and Thomas Brabson houses, a late 18th-century plank house, a frame tannery building, a 19th-century barn, and a late 18th-century log cabin. The center of the farm is situated along a gravel driveway just off Indian Warpath Road. The Benjamin Brabson house once overlooked Brabson's Ferry along the French Broad River. The Thomas Brabson house overlooks the junction of Indian Warpath Road and Highway 338, where the Brabsons' tannery, blacksmith shop, and storehouse once stood. Slave houses (no longer standing) were located on the east side of Indian Warpath Road between State Route 338 and the gravel driveway, and at least one once stood between the Benjamin Brabson house and the river.

The Brabson plank house was built by either Andrew Evans or John Brabson sometime between 1790 and 1810. The plank house was constructed using the piece-sur-piece method, which involves stacking horizontal planks and tying them in with vertical posts. In the 19th century, the plank house was moved from its original location and renovated for use as a carriage house. A large double door was added to the front, and the chimney was removed. A hewn log cabin, possibly built by John Brabson in the late 18th century, originally stood near the river but was moved to its present site near the cemetery in the 19th century.

The Thomas Brabson house, built in 1854, is a two-story Federal-style house with a Greek Revival portico. A 1-1/2 story kitchen wing is attached to the rear of the house to create an "L" shape. Square doric columns grace the portico. The Benjamin Brabson house, built in 1856, was originally a Federal-style house similar to the Thomas Brabson house, although a Victorian porch and Queen Anne-style gable were added to the front of the house in the 1890s. Both houses contain most of their original design elements, including large post-and-lintel mantels and open "dog-leg" staircases.

== See also ==
- Wheatlands
