= Keener-Johnson Farm =

Historic house in Tennessee, United States

- Keener--Johnson Farm
- U.S. National Register of Historic Places
- U.S. Historic district
- Location within Tennessee
- Nearest city: Seymour, Tennessee
- Coordinates: 35.8884°N 83.72923°W
- Area: 168 acres (68 ha)
- Built: 1853
- Architectural style: Greek Revival
- NRHP reference No.: 99000367
- Added to NRHP: March 18, 1999

Keener-Johnson Farm is a historic farmhouse in Seymour, Tennessee, U.S.. It was built circa 1853 for Adam Harvey Keener. It has been listed on the National Register of Historic Places since March 18, 1999.
