= Wheatlands (Sevierville, Tennessee) =

Historic house in Tennessee, United States

- U.S. National Register of Historic Places
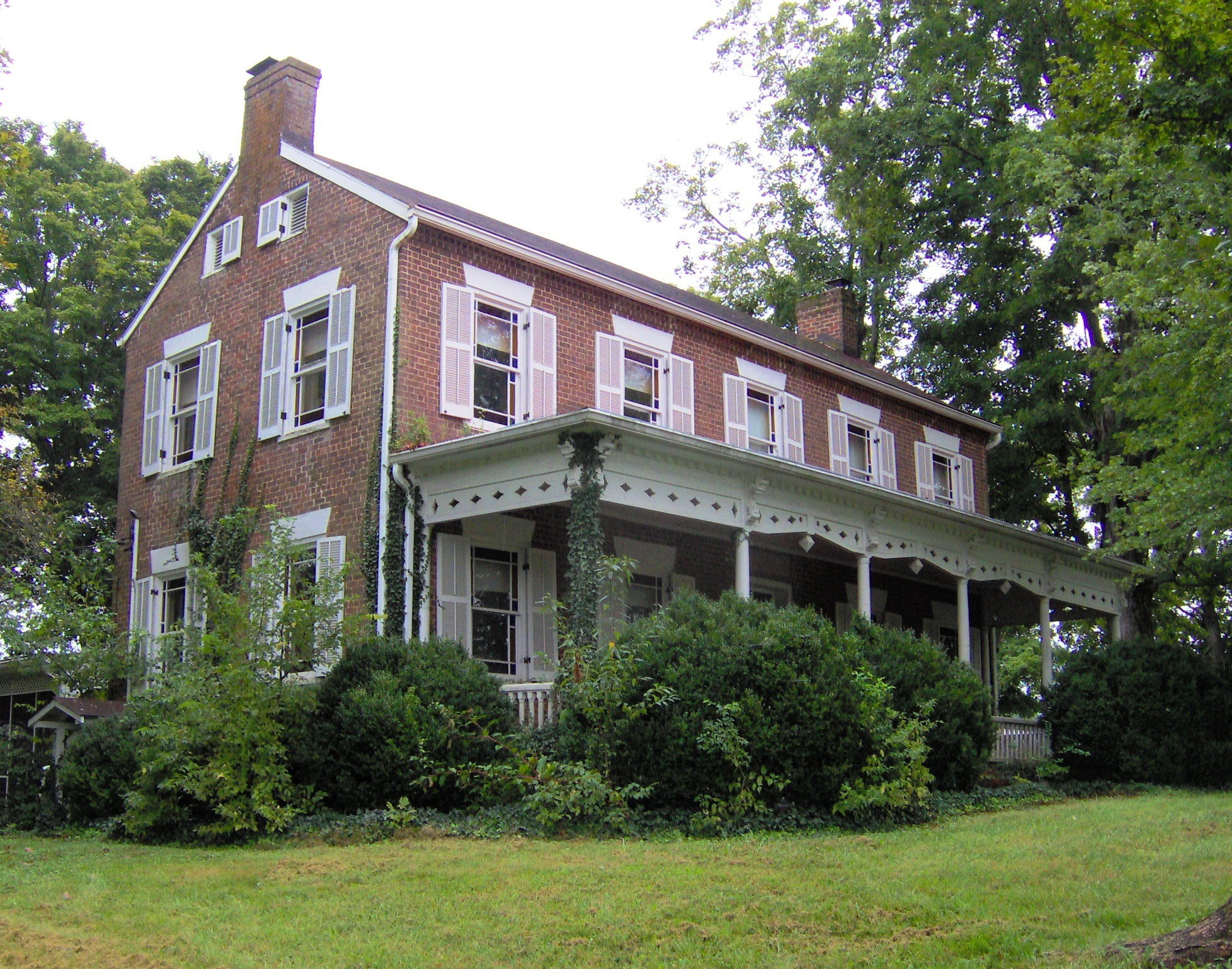
- Northeast corner of the house at Wheatlands

- Location within Tennessee Location within the United States
- Interactive map showing the location of Wheatlands
- Location: NW of Sevierville on Old Knoxville Hwy.
- Coordinates: 35°55′7″N 83°40′6″W
- Built: 1825
- NRHP reference No.: 75001785
- Added to NRHP: July 7, 1975

Wheatlands is an antebellum plantation in Sevier County, Tennessee. The plantation's surviving structures—which include the plantation house, a storage shed, and smokehouse—have been placed on the National Register of Historic Places. The plantation house has been called the best example of a Federal-style building remaining in Sevier County.

Wheatlands, named after its large annual wheat crop, was established as a family farm by Revolutionary War veteran Timothy Chandler in 1791. Chandler's son, John Chandler (1786–1875), inherited Wheatlands in 1819, and under his direction the plantation grew to become one of Sevier County's largest farms, covering 3,700 acres (1,500 ha) by 1850. Chandler's freed slaves inherited part of Wheatlands in 1875 and formed the Chandler Gap community in the hills south of the plantation.

== Location ==
Wheatlands is located at the corner of Tennessee State Route 338 (Boyds Creek Highway) and Cedar Springs Valley Road in Boyds Creek, about halfway between Sevierville and Seymour. The plantation was situated along the banks of Boyd's Creek, which empties into the French Broad River at the Brabson's Ferry Plantation about a mile to the east. This gave Wheatlands access to the nation's interior waterways, allowing this shipment of its "wheat whiskey" to New Orleans.

== History ==
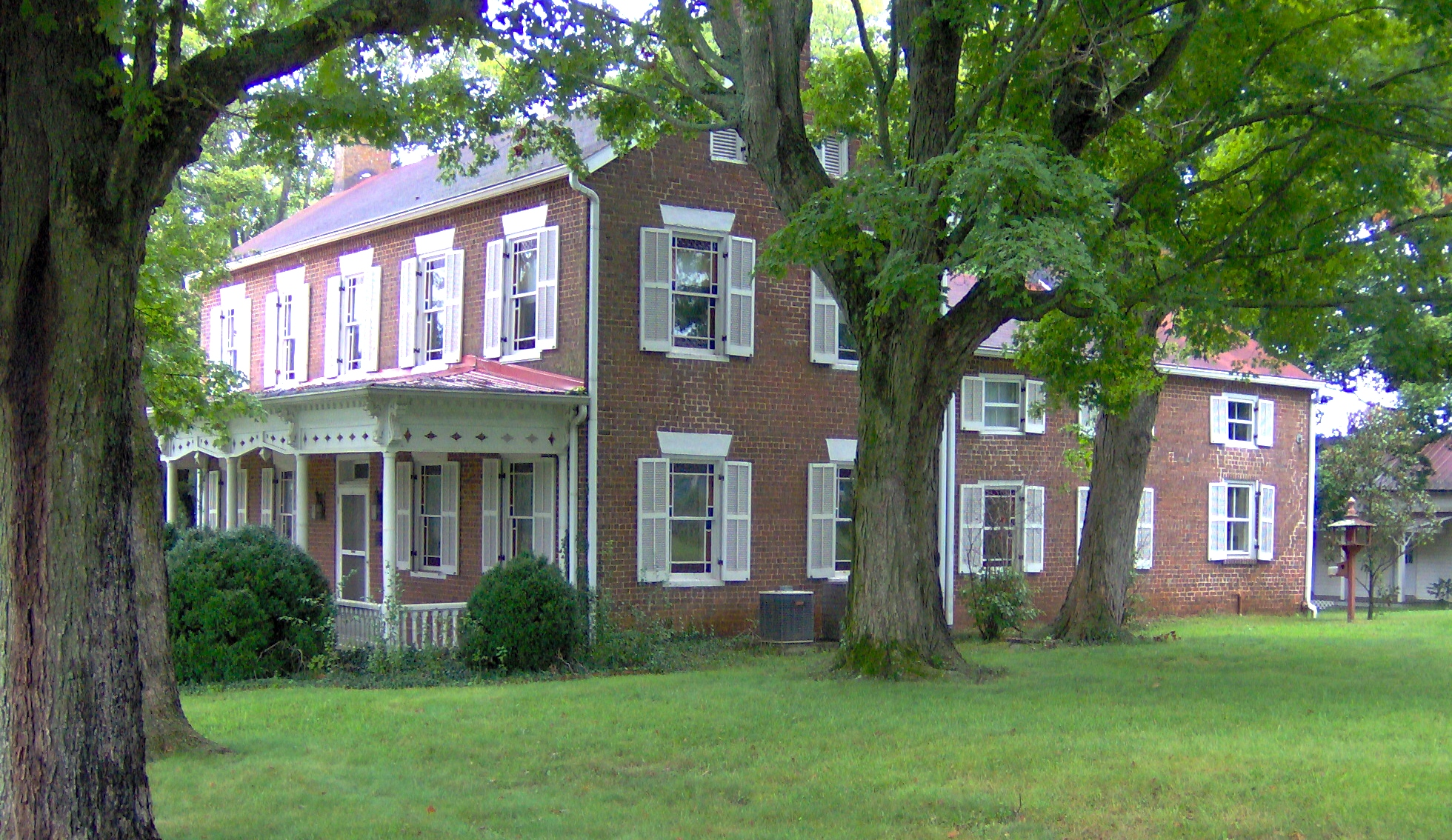
View of the west end of the house, showing the rear kitchen/dining room wing

State Route 338 roughly follows what was once a section of the 18th-century Native American trail known as the Great Indian Warpath. In 1780, John Sevier followed the path across the French Broad River to engage and defeat a Cherokee force at the Battle of Boyd's Creek, which took place at the future site of Wheatlands. Early settlers also followed the trail into the Boyd's Creek area, among them Timothy Chandler, a Revolutionary War veteran from Virginia, who moved his family to Boyd's Creek in 1791.

After Chandler died in 1819, his son John inherited the farm. The original Chandler farmhouse burned in 1823, and John built the present plantation house at the site to replace it. By 1850, Wheatlands had become one of the largest farms in Sevier County, covering some 4,600 acres (1,900 ha) and included 15 horses, 10 mules, 40 cattle, 50 sheep, and 300 hogs. Chandler and 14 slaves produced 3,000 bushels of corn, 400 bushels of oats, 200 bushels of sweet potatoes, 12 bushels of buckwheat, 10 tons of hay, 150 pounds of wool, 200 pounds of butter, and 200 gallons of honey. The plantation's distillery produced 6,000 gallons of whiskey.

Wheatlands was used as winter quarters for the Union by Tenth Regiment Cavalry out of Michigan and the 8th division from western Pennsylvania. They ran raids into Sevierville, Gatlinburg and Newport. They sent troops to the Brabson Plantation and took over their ferry and occupied Bartley Chandler's home in Sevierville as a prison. Two cannons were sent to "Battle of Fair Garden" and shot over the Rose Glen Plantation.

When Southern slaves were emancipated following the war, Chandler started paying his freed slaves to remain at Wheatlands. Upon his death in 1875, Chandler left his former slaves a portion of land along the south side of Wheatlands known as Chandler Gap. The Chandler Gap community remained a predominantly African-American community well into the 20th century.

In 2011, three Pigeon Forge businessmen purchased Wheatlands and announced plans to restore the house, and possibly re-establish a distillery on the property.

== Structures ==
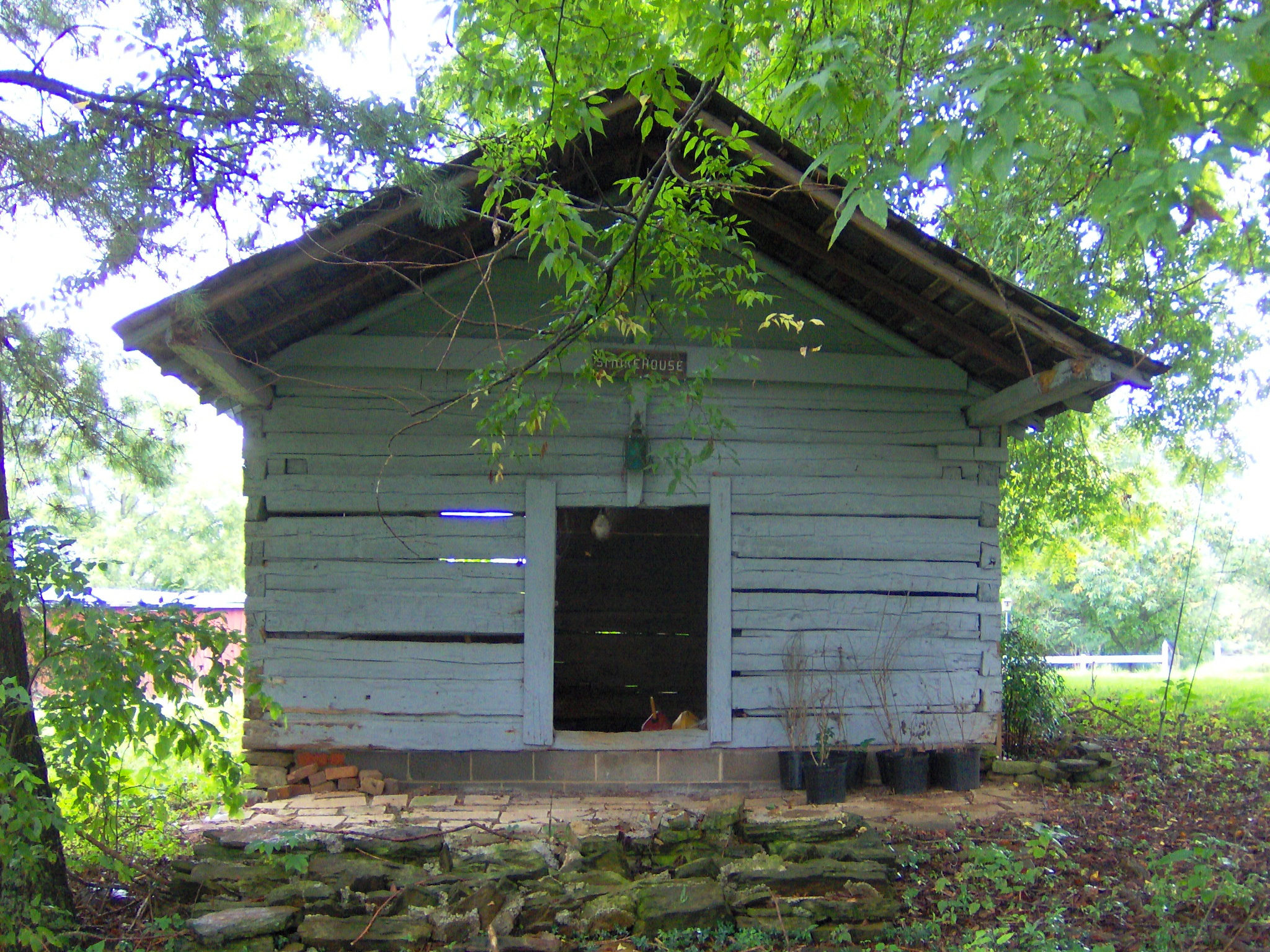
Smokehouse at Wheatlands

Original structures at Wheatlands include the mansion house (rebuilt around 1825 after a fire), a smokehouse, a summer kitchen with a dining hall, and a loom house. A second storage shed and barn have been added more recently. The distillery burned in the late 1930s. The original house, made of clapboard with a large front porch, burned in 1824 and was rebuilt in 1825.

The mansion is a 2-story, 5-bay brick house with a 1.5-story kitchen and dining room wing attached to the rear to form an "L" shape. The house is designed in the Federal style, although a Queen Anne-style front porch was added as well as Queen Anne Windows in 1889. The brickwork on the front facade uses a Flemish bond, and the brickwork on the sides and rear uses common bond. A brick cornice encircles the house. The interior of the house retains most of its original design elements, which include hand-planed railings and windows. The mantel designs were based on Adamesque models in patternbooks and include hand-carved details and entablatures. The house is based on a central floor plan, rather than a parlor hall floor plan which was more typical of the period.

A frame storage shed built sometime around 1825 stands a few feet behind the house. The shed, which has beaded clapboard, may have once housed a distillery, an ice house, or a loom house. The smokehouse dates to the first half of the 19th century and is constructed of hewn logs with a batten door.
