= Sevierville, Tennessee =

- City
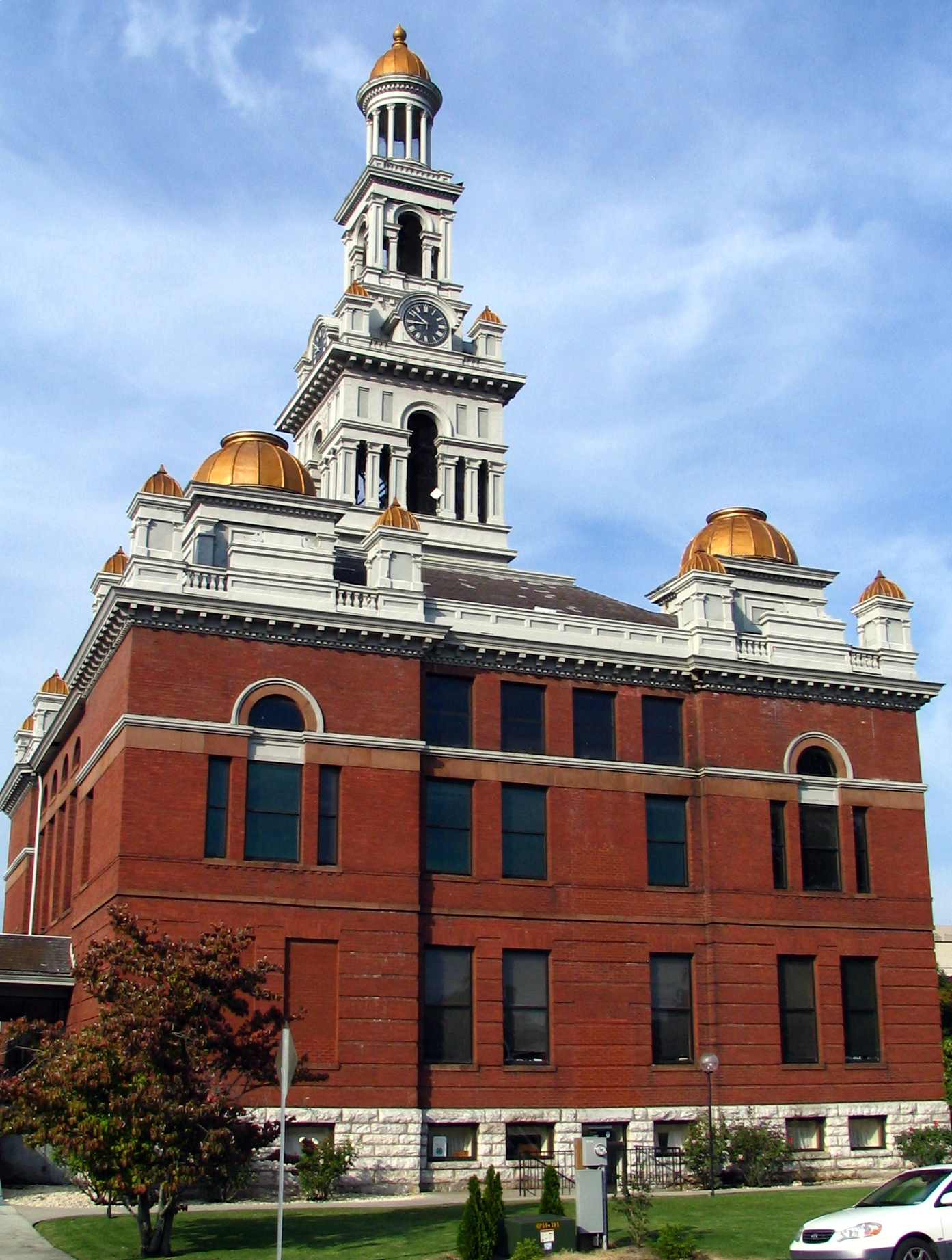
- Sevier County Courthouse

- Flag Logo
- Motto: "Your Hometown in the Smokies."
- Location of Sevierville in Sevier County, Tennessee.

- Location within Tennessee Location within the United States
- Coordinates: 35°53′13″N 83°36′12″W
- Country: United States
- State: Tennessee
- County: Sevier
- Founded: 1795
- Incorporated: 1901
- Named for: John Sevier

Government
  - Type: Mayor–council–administrator
  - Mayor: Robert Fox (R)
  - City administrator: Dustin Smith
  - Aldermen: Aldermen: Devin Koester; Wayne Helton; Travis McCroskey; Joey Ohman; Mitch Rader

Area
  - Total: 24.25 sq mi (62.80 km^{2})
  - Land: 24.12 sq mi (62.47 km^{2})
  - Water: 0.13 sq mi (0.33 km^{2}) 0.50%
- Elevation: 971 ft (296 m)

Population (2020)
  - Total: 17,889
  - Density: 741.7/sq mi (286.37/km^{2})
- Estimate
- Time zone: UTC-5 (EST)
  - Summer (DST): UTC-4 (EDT)
- ZIP Codes: 37764, 37862, 37864, 37876
- Area code: 865
- FIPS code: 47-67120
- GNIS feature ID: 2405447
- Website: seviervilletn.org

Sevierville (/səˈvɪərvɪl/ sə-VEER-vil) is a city in and the county seat of Sevier County, Tennessee, United States, located in East Tennessee. The population was 17,889 at the 2020 United States Census.

== History ==
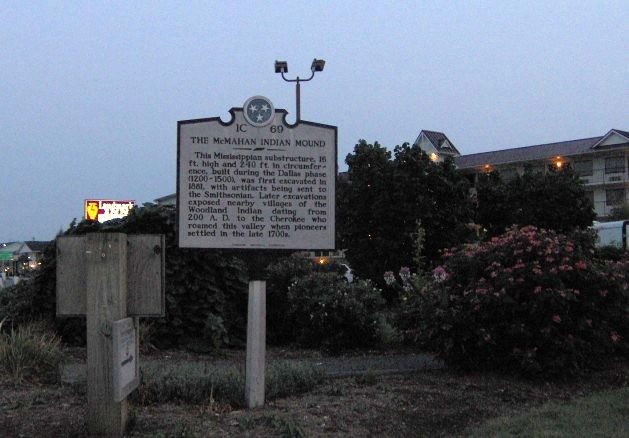
Tennessee Historical Commission sign marking the site of the McMahan Indian Mound, 1200–1500 A.D.

Native Americans of the Woodland period were among the first human inhabitants of the area that became Sevierville. They arrived circa 200 A.D.

Between 1200 and 1500 A.D., during the Dallas phase of the Mississippian period, a group of Native Americans established McMahan Mound Site, a relatively large village centered on a platform mound and surrounded by a palisade just above the confluence of the West Fork and the Little Pigeon River. This mound was approximately 16 feet (5 m) high and 240 feet (73 m) across. An excavation in 1881 unearthed burial sites, arrowheads, a marble pipe, glass beads, pottery, and engraved objects. At the time of this first excavation, the mound was located on a farm owned by the McMahan family, and was thus given the name "McMahan Indian Mound."

By the early 18th century, the Cherokee controlled much of the Tennessee side of the Smokies and had established a series of settlements along the Little Tennessee River. A section of the Great Indian Warpath forked at the mouth of Boyd's Creek, just north of Sevierville. The main branch crossed the French Broad and continued along Dumplin Creek to the Nolichucky basin in northeastern Tennessee. The other branch, known as the Tuckaleechee and Southeastern Trail, turned south along the West Fork of the Little Pigeon River. This second branch forked again at modern-day Pigeon Forge, with the main trail turning east en route to Little River and the other branch, known as Indian Gap Trail, crossing the crest of the Smokies to the south and descending into the Oconaluftee area of North Carolina. The various Cherokee trails crossing Sevier County brought the first Euro-American traders and settlers to the area.

=== Early Euro-American settlement ===
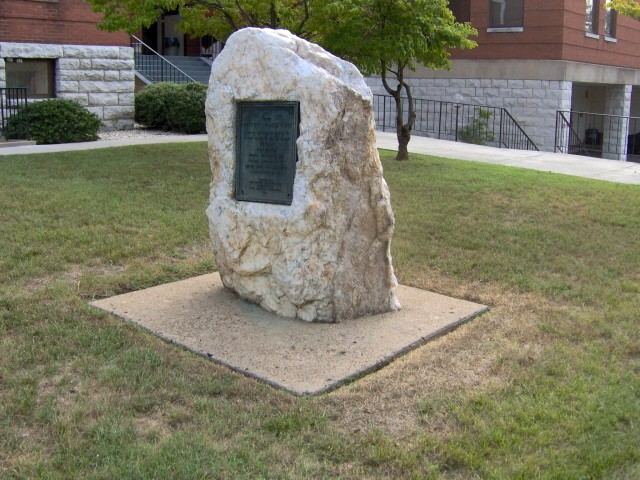
Plaque honoring Sevierville pioneer Spencer Clack at the Sevier County Courthouse

European long hunters and traders arrived in the Sevierville area in the mid-18th century. Isaac Thomas (c. 1735–1818), the most notable of these early traders, was well respected by the Cherokee and may have lived at the Overhill town of Chota at one time. Europeans like Thomas were mainly in the area in search of animal furs, which they exchanged for manufactured goods.

As settlers began to trickle into East Tennessee, relations with the Cherokee began to turn hostile. During the Revolutionary War, the Cherokee, who had aligned themselves with the British, launched sporadic attacks against the sparse settlements in the Tennessee Valley. In December 1780, Col. John Sevier, fresh off a victory against the British at King's Mountain, launched a punitive expedition against the Cherokee. Sevier defeated the Cherokee at the Battle of Boyd's Creek and proceeded to destroy several Cherokee settlements along the Little Tennessee.

A temporary truce secured by James White in 1783 led to an influx of Euro-American settlers in the French Broad valley. Hugh Henry (1756–1838) erected a small fort near the mouth of Dumplin Creek in 1782 known as Henry's Station. He was joined the following year by Samuel Newell (1754–1841), who established Newell's Station along Boyd's Creek, and Joshua Gist, who settled near the creek's mouth. Other early forts in the area included Willson's Station at the confluence of the East and Middle Fork of the Little Pigeon and Wear's Fort at the junction of the Southeastern and Tuckaleechee Trail and Indian Gap Trail. The Cherokee signed away all rights to what is now Sevier County in the 1785 Treaty of Dumplin Creek, which was negotiated at Henry's Station.

In 1783, Isaac Thomas established a farm, trading post, and tavern at the confluence of the West Fork and the Little Pigeon River. He was joined shortly thereafter by Spencer Clack and James McMahan, and a community known as "Forks of the Little Pigeon" developed around them. In 1789, Reverend Richard Wood (1756–1831) established Forks-of-the-River Baptist Church, which reported a congregation of 22 in 1790. By 1795, the congregation had 94 members.

=== Antebellum Sevierville ===
Sevier County was created in 1794 and named after John Sevier. At a meeting at Thomas' house the following year, the Forks-of-the-Little-Pigeon area was chosen as the county seat and renamed "Sevierville." James McMahan donated a 25-acre (100,000 m^{2}) tract of land for erecting a town square. This tract was parceled out into lots of 0.5 acres (2,000 m^{2}) that purchasers were required to build brick, framed, or stone structures on.

The first Sevier County Courthouse was built in 1796. According to local legend, court was held in a flea-infested abandoned stable before its construction. The lore suggests that irritated lawyers paid an unknown person a bottle of whiskey to burn down the stable, forcing the new county to build an actual courthouse.

As the county grew, several large farms were established in the fertile Boyd's Creek area. In 1792, Andrew Evans purchased a tract of land near the mouth of Boyd's Creek and built a ferry near the site of the old ford. In 1798, he sold the farm to John Brabson, and it became known as Brabson's Ferry Plantation. In the early 1790s, Thomas Buckingham established a large farm between Boyd's Creek and Sevierville. He went on to become the county's first sheriff. In the early 19th century, Timothy Chandler and his son, John Chandler (1786–1875), established the Wheatlands plantation in Boyd's Creek.

As towns situated along the French Broad are connected via waterway to New Orleans, flatboat trade flourished along the river in the early 19th century. In 1793, James Hubbert, who lived along Dumplin Creek, established Hubbert's Flat Landing to trade with flatboats moving up and down the river.

In the early 19th century, Knoxville and Asheville were connected via Route 17, a crude road that followed the banks of the French Broad. This new road gave Tennessee's cattle drovers greater access to markets along the east coast. In 1820, a stagecoach road connected Sevierville with Maryville to the west. Sevierville's status as a county seat along these early roads helped it grow. By 1833, the town had a population of 150, including two doctors, two carpenters, a tanner, two tailors, a shoemaker, three stores, a hatter, two taverns, and two mills. Distilleries were popular means of supplemental income. By 1850, John Chandler's distillery was producing 6,000 gallons of whiskey per year.

A notable late arrival in Sevierville was Dr. Robert H. Hodsden (1806–1864), who was an attending physician for the Trail of Tears. In 1846, Hodsden began construction on a plantation near Fair Garden, just outside Sevierville to the east. Known as Rose Glen, this plantation was worth $28,000 in 1860, making it one of the most valuable in the county.

In 1856, a fire swept through Sevierville, burning a recently constructed courthouse, 41 houses, and several shops in the downtown area. The county lost nearly all of the vital records of its early settlers.

=== The Civil War ===
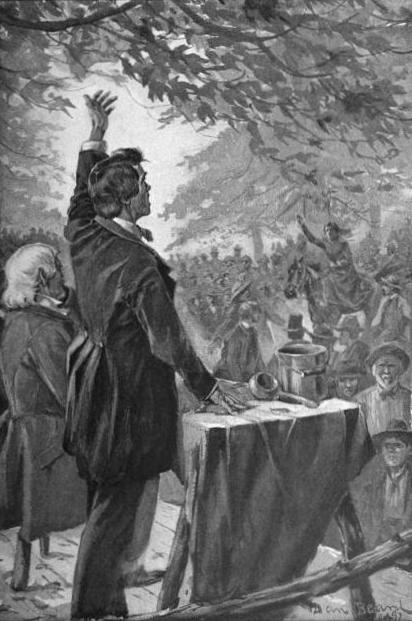
William "Parson" Brownlow delivers an anti-secession speech in Sevierville in 1861

Slavery was not common in Sevier County, although it did occur, especially at the large plantations along the French Broad River. Even before the American Civil War, Sevierville – a hotbed of abolitionist activity – was home to a relatively large community of free African-Americans. In 1861, only 3.8% of the residents of Sevier County voted in favor of secession from the Union.

In late 1861, a pro-secession speech delivered by Henry Foote sparked an angry response in Sevierville and was followed by a series of explosive anti-secession speeches. The following year, pro-Union Knoxville newspaper editor Parson Brownlow gave a rousing anti-secession speech in Sevierville en route to a hideout in Wears Valley. Brownlow's audience remained gathered throughout the night after a rumor spread that Confederate forces were approaching. Union supporters in Sevier County were harassed and threatened throughout the war, even after Union forces under Ambrose Burnside occupied Knoxville in September 1863.

Sevierville, situated at a major crossroads south of Knoxville, suffered consistent harassment, looting, and confiscation of property by both Union and Confederate forces moving through the town in 1863 and 1864. Vance Newman, a Union recruiting officer living in Sevierville at the time, later recalled:

A guard of rebel soldiers in 1864 threatened to burn my house, and the rebel soldiers so often threatened to take my life that I cannot particularize. They were always after me because of my Union sentiments.

After Confederate General James Longstreet failed to retake Knoxville in the Battle of Fort Sanders, Union and Confederate forces quickly initiated a series of maneuvers to gain control of the strategic fords along the French Broad, culminating in an engagement near Hodsden's farm at Fair Garden in January 1864. Although the Union forces were victorious, they were later forced to retreat due to lack of supplies. A state of general anarchy ensued that continued until the end of the war. On October 30, 1864, Sevierville resident Terressa McCown wrote in her diary:

The robbers have come at last, they robbed my husband of his pocketbook, money and papers and pocket knife. Times get worse everyday. We know not what will come next. I feel this morning like nothing but destruction awaits us.

At the war's end, most of the county's few remaining Confederate sympathizers, most notably members of the Brabson family, were forced to flee.

=== Postwar-present ===
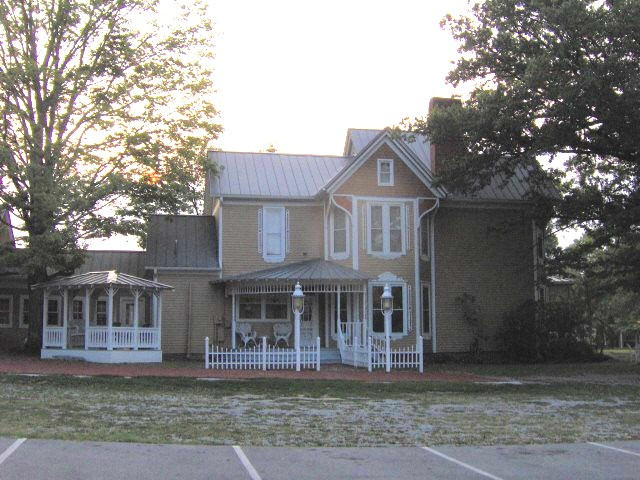
House at 217 Cedar in Sevierville, designed by Lewis Buckner

Sevierville recovered quickly from the war, with a number of new houses and businesses being built in the 1870s. Two members of the town's African-American community — house builder Lewis Buckner (1856–1924) and brickmason Isaac Dockery (1832–1910) — played a prominent role in Sevierville's post-war construction boom. Buckner designed a number of houses in the Sevierville area over a 40-year period, 15 of which are still standing. Dockery's contributions include the New Salem Baptist Church in 1886 and the Sevier County Courthouse in 1896, both of which are still standing.

By the 1880s, Sevierville was growing rapidly, as was the population of Sevier County. In 1887, the town had four general stores, two groceries, a jeweler, a sawmill, and two hotels. It was also home to the Sevierville Lumber Company, which was established to harvest trees in the area. Tourists also started to trickle into Sevier County, drawn by the reported health-restoring qualities of mountain springs. Resorts sprang up throughout the county, with Seaton Springs and Henderson Springs located just south of Sevierville.

In 1892, a vigilante group known as the "Whitecaps" was formed to rid Sevier County of vice. The group wore white hoods to conceal their identities and used Ku Klux Klan-like tactics, although they were not considered a racist entity. The Whitecaps initially threatened women accused of prostitution, and the group began launching nightly attacks in the mid-1890s. In 1893, Sevierville physician J.A. Henderson took over an anti-Whitecap group, which he renamed the "Blue Bills." The two vigilante groups clashed at Henderson Springs in 1894, with deaths occurring on both sides. In 1896, the Whitecaps' murder of a young Sevierville couple led to widespread outrage, and in 1898, the Tennessee State Legislature banned "extra-legal conspiracies" and vigilante groups. Due to this measure and the efforts of Sevier County Deputy Sheriff Thomas Davis, the Whitecaps largely vanished by the end of the century.

After a fire destroyed much of the downtown area in 1900, businesses shifted from the old town square at Main Street to the new Sevierville Commercial District, viz. Court Avenue and Bruce Street, which centered on the new courthouse. The town incorporated in 1901.

In 1910, Indiana entrepreneur William J. Oliver finished work on the Knoxville, Sevierville and Eastern Railroad, which was Sevier County's first standard gauge rail line. Known as the Smoky Mountain Railroad, this line offered passenger service between Knoxville and Sevierville until 1962.

With the opening of Great Smoky Mountains National Park in 1934, tens of thousands of tourists began passing through Sevierville, which was situated about halfway between the park and Knoxville. U.S. 441, initially known as Smoky Mountain Highway, was completed to Sevierville in 1934 and later extended to North Carolina.

Entertainer Dolly Parton was born in Sevierville in 1946. Her Parton ancestors had migrated to Greenbrier sometime around 1850 and later moved to Locust Ridge (near Pittman Center), where Parton was born, after the establishment of the national park. In more recent years, the town erected a statue of Parton on the lawn of the courthouse and named Dolly Parton Parkway after her.

Much of Cormac McCarthy's 1973 novel Child of God takes place in Sevierville and the surrounding area.

=== Registered historic sites ===
- Riley H. Andes House: African-American carpenter Lewis Buckner designed and built this house in 1890. Added to the National Register of Historic Places in 1980, the house is still in use today as an art gallery.
- Brabson's Ferry Plantation: Established by Andrew Evans in the early 1790s and purchased by John Brabson in 1798, this plantation site near Boyd's Creek includes a plank house from the late 18th century and two plantation houses. The site was added to the National Register of Historic Places in 1975.
- Buckingham House: Located between Sevierville and Boyd's Creek, this home was built in the late 18th century by Thomas Buckingham, the first sheriff of Sevier county. It is the oldest house in the county and was added to the National Register of Historic Places in 1971.
- New Salem Baptist Church: This historic church was built by Isaac Dockery for the local African-American community in 1886. It was added to the National Register of Historic Places in 2003.
- Perry's Camp: Now known as Flat Branch Cottages, the area was developed as a tourist resort by Charlie Perry in the late 1920s. The site was added to the National Register of Historic Places in 1992.
- Rocky Springs Presbyterian Church: Built in 1891, this Folk Victorian-style church also has elements of Queen Anne architecture. It was added to the National Register of Historic Places in 2013.
- Rose Glen: The former home of Dr. Robert H. Hodsden, it was built in the 1840s and added to the National Register of Historic Places in 1975. Surviving buildings include the plantation house, loom house, physician's office, and a barn.
- Sevier County Courthouse: Designed by the McDonald Brothers of Louisville and constructed by C.W. Brown of Lenoir City in 1895, this courthouse was added to the National Register of Historic Places in 1971. It's an example of the Beaux Arts style and has brickwork completed by Isaac Dockery.
- Sevierville Commercial Historic District: Added to the National Register of Historic Places in 1986, this district includes Court Avenue, Bruce Street, and Commerce Street, all near the courthouse. The area became a commercial center when the old commercial district burned in the early 20th century.
- Sevierville Masonic Lodge: Built in 1893 for use by a local Masonic lodge, this building was added to the National Register of Historic Places in 1980.
- Thomas Addition Historic District: This housing area in southeast Sevierville is mostly made up of bungalows and Queen Anne cottages built in the late 19th and early 20th centuries. The area was added to the National Register of Historic Places in 1994.
- Trotter–McMahan House & Farm (Boundary Increase): Built in 1848 by Dr. William Harrison Trotter, this house has a style designed by architect Frederick Emert to be different from other houses in the area. It was added to the National Register of Historic Places in 1975. A separate registration increased the boundary of the site to include the surrounding farm and outbuildings in 2001.
- U.S. Post Office – Sevierville: A Colonial Revival style building built in 1940 by the Works Project Administration, it has been the site of a heritage museum since 1995 and was added to the National Register of Historic Places in 1997.
- Dwight and Kate Wade House: This Colonial Revival home was designed by female architect Verna Cook Salomonsky based on plans for a home she designed for the 1939–1940 New York World's Fair. Built in 1940, it was added to the National Register of Historic Places in 1997.
- Walker Mill Hydroelectric Station: Located on the West Prong of the Little Pigeon River near Sevierville, the site includes a dam, substructure, and powerhouse. It began generating electricity in 1914 and was added to the National Register of Historic Places in 1990.
- Waters House: This Victorian home was designed by Lewis Buckner and built around 1895. It was added to the National Register of Historic Places in 1975.
- Wheatlands: Named for its focus on wheat farming, this plantation was built in the early 19th century by John Chandler, who also owned a distillery that made wheat whiskey. The smokehouse, storage shed, and plantation house were added to the National Register of Historic Places in 1975.
- Harrisburg Covered Bridge: Crossing the East Fork of the Little Pigeon River near Sevierville, this king post truss style bridge was completed in 1875 and added to the National Register of Historic Places in 1975.

== Geography ==
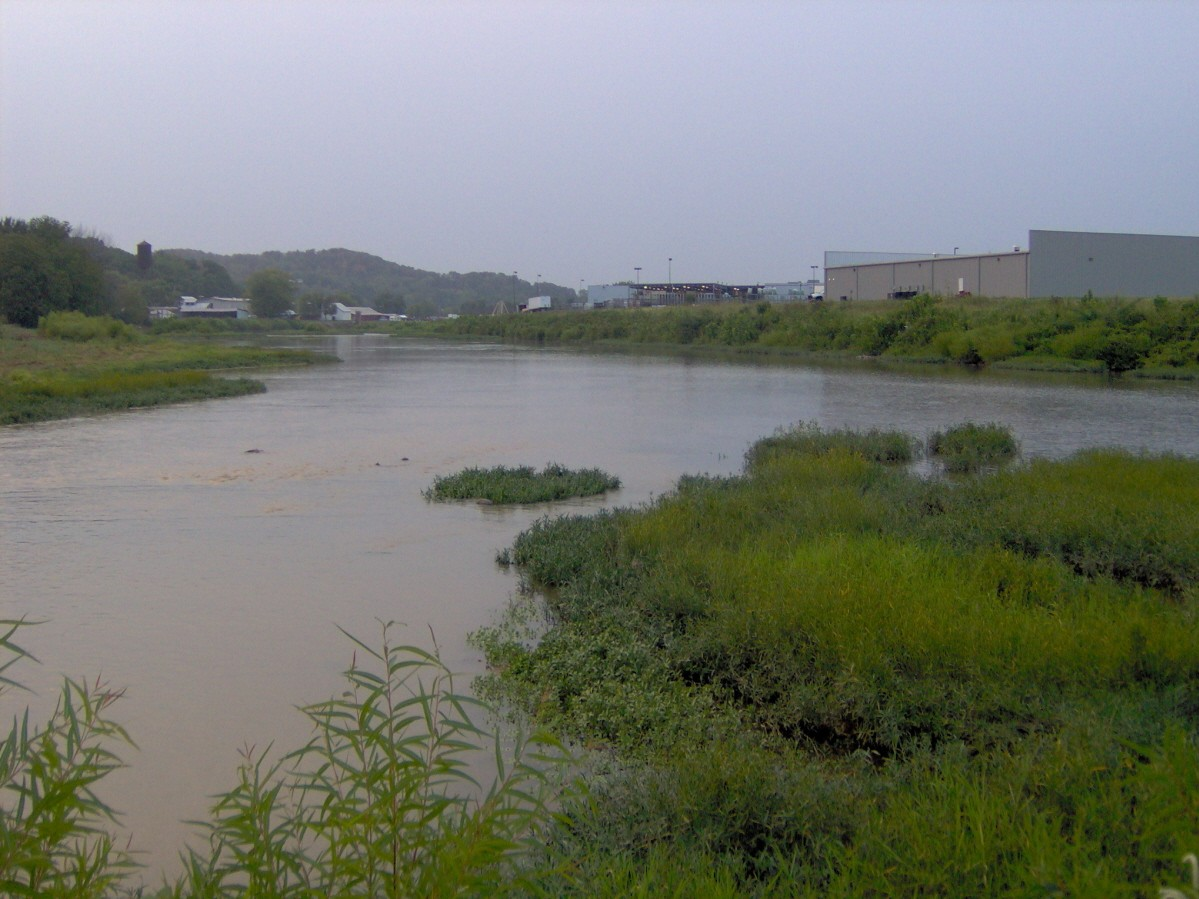
The confluence of the West Fork of the Little Pigeon River (left) and the Little Pigeon River (right)

Sevierville is located along the Little Pigeon River which is formed by the confluence of its East Fork and Middle Fork, both of which flow down from their sources high in the Great Smoky Mountains. Five miles (8 km) downstream to the west, the Little Pigeon absorbs its West Fork before turning north and flowing for another five miles (8 km) to its mouth along the French Broad River. Sevierville is centered on the stretch of land between these two junctions of the East and Middle Fork and the West Fork, known traditionally as Forks-of-the-Pigeon or Forks-of-the-River.

Situated in an area where the Foothills of the Great Smokies give way to the Tennessee Valley, Sevierville has long acted as a nexus between Knoxville to the north and the Appalachian towns in the mountains to the south. Great Smoky Mountains National Park is located approximately ten miles south of Sevierville.

Due to its hilly terrain and the relatively poor roads of 19th-century Sevier County, a number of smaller communities developed independently along the outskirts of Sevierville. These include Harrisburg and Fair Garden to the east and Catlettsburg and Boyd's Creek to the north. In addition, the United States Postal Service associates the name "Sevierville" with ZIP codes for much of Sevier County, including some of the town of Pittman Center and other geographically extensive areas located outside Sevierville's city limits.

Several major state and federal highways intersect in Sevierville. U.S. Route 441, commonly called "The Parkway," connects Sevierville with Knoxville to the north and the national park and Cherokee, North Carolina, to the south. The Sevierville section of U.S. 441 has been named "Forks-of-the-River Parkway." State Route 66, also called Winfield Dunn Parkway, connects Sevierville with Interstate 40 to the north. U.S. Route 411 traverses Sevierville from east to west, connecting Sevierville with Blount and Cocke counties. State Route 416 connects Sevierville with Pittman Center and U.S. Route 321 at the park boundary to the southeast.

According to the United States Census Bureau, the city has a total area of 24.24 square miles (62.8 km^{2}), of which 24.14 square miles (62.5 km^{2}) is land and 0.11 square miles (0.28 km^{2}) (0.45%) is water.

=== Neighborhoods ===
There are several neighborhoods located within Sevierville, offering different lifestyles and retail opportunities:

- East Sevierville
- Northview-Kodak
- Old Town
- Riverview
- South Sevierville

=== Climate ===
Climate data for Sevierville, Tennessee (1991–2020 normals, extremes 1955–present)
Month	Jan	Feb	Mar	Apr	May	Jun	Jul	Aug	Sep	Oct	Nov	Dec	Year
Record high °F (°C)	80 (27)	85 (29)	87 (31)	94 (34)	93 (34)	100 (38)	106 (41)	104 (40)	101 (38)	97 (36)	86 (30)	80 (27)	106 (41)
Mean maximum °F (°C)	70.0 (21.1)	73.0 (22.8)	79.7 (26.5)	85.9 (29.9)	89.5 (31.9)	93.8 (34.3)	95.5 (35.3)	95.4 (35.2)	92.7 (33.7)	85.8 (29.9)	77.1 (25.1)	70.5 (21.4)	96.7 (35.9)
Mean daily maximum °F (°C)	49.0 (9.4)	53.8 (12.1)	62.7 (17.1)	72.2 (22.3)	80.2 (26.8)	87.1 (30.6)	89.6 (32.0)	89.4 (31.9)	84.0 (28.9)	73.8 (23.2)	61.4 (16.3)	52.1 (11.2)	71.3 (21.8)
Daily mean °F (°C)	38.2 (3.4)	42.0 (5.6)	49.5 (9.7)	58.5 (14.7)	67.4 (19.7)	75.1 (23.9)	78.3 (25.7)	77.5 (25.3)	71.8 (22.1)	60.2 (15.7)	48.4 (9.1)	41.0 (5.0)	59.0 (15.0)
Mean daily minimum °F (°C)	27.4 (−2.6)	30.2 (−1.0)	36.3 (2.4)	44.8 (7.1)	54.7 (12.6)	63.1 (17.3)	67.1 (19.5)	65.7 (18.7)	59.5 (15.3)	46.6 (8.1)	35.4 (1.9)	29.9 (−1.2)	46.7 (8.2)
Mean minimum °F (°C)	10.0 (−12.2)	14.9 (−9.5)	20.2 (−6.6)	30.0 (−1.1)	39.3 (4.1)	52.7 (11.5)	59.1 (15.1)	57.7 (14.3)	46.3 (7.9)	31.9 (−0.1)	22.0 (−5.6)	16.5 (−8.6)	6.9 (−13.9)
Record low °F (°C)	−24 (−31)	−16 (−27)	−4 (−20)	18 (−8)	27 (−3)	30 (−1)	43 (6)	41 (5)	31 (−1)	19 (−7)	7 (−14)	−13 (−25)	−24 (−31)
Average precipitation inches (mm)	4.41 (112)	4.26 (108)	4.69 (119)	4.32 (110)	3.87 (98)	4.26 (108)	4.65 (118)	3.40 (86)	3.56 (90)	2.90 (74)	3.56 (90)	4.90 (124)	48.78 (1,239)
Average snowfall inches (cm)	1.5 (3.8)	1.0 (2.5)	0.9 (2.3)	0.0 (0.0)	0.0 (0.0)	0.0 (0.0)	0.0 (0.0)	0.0 (0.0)	0.0 (0.0)	0.0 (0.0)	0.0 (0.0)	0.2 (0.51)	3.6 (9.1)
Average precipitation days (≥ 0.01 in)	10.9	10.8	11.8	10.7	10.6	10.7	11.1	9.4	8.1	8.0	9.1	11.9	123.1
Average snowy days (≥ 0.1 in)	0.7	0.6	0.2	0.0	0.0	0.0	0.0	0.0	0.0	0.0	0.1	0.3	1.9
Source: NOAA

== Demographics ==
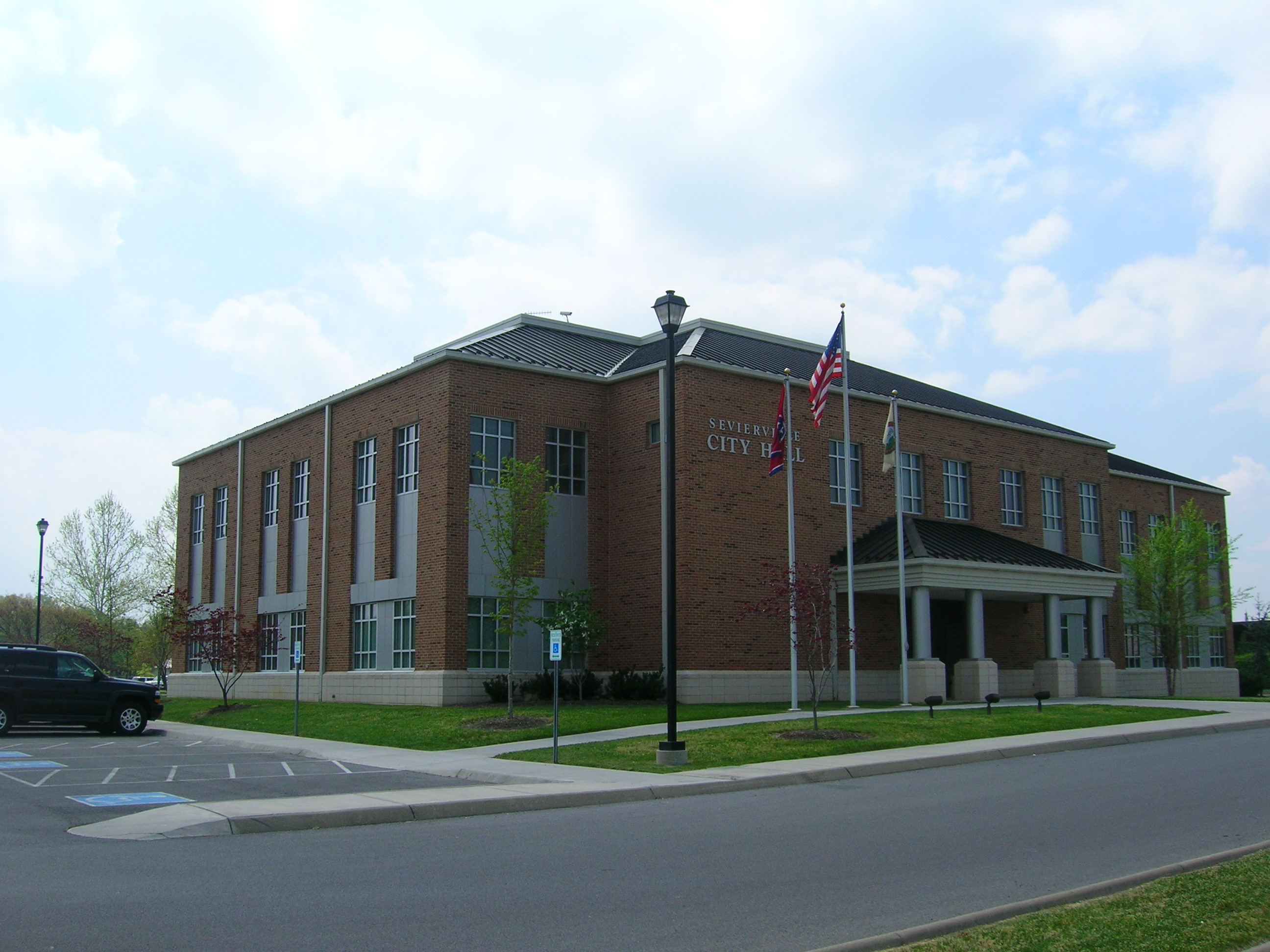
Sevierville City Hall

Historical population
Census	Pop.	Note	%±
1870	159		—
1880	253		59.1%
1890	283		11.9%
1910	675		—
1920	776		15.0%
1930	882		13.7%
1940	1,161		31.6%
1950	1,620		39.5%
1960	2,890		78.4%
1970	2,661		−7.9%
1980	4,556		71.2%
1990	7,178		57.6%
2000	11,757		63.8%
2010	14,807		25.9%
2020	17,889		20.8%
2025 (est.)	19,010	▲	6.3%

Sevierville is the principal city of the Sevierville, Tennessee, Micropolitan Statistical Area, which includes all of Sevier County, and is part of the Knoxville-Sevierville-La Follette Combined Statistical Area.

=== Racial and ethnic composition ===
Sevierville city, Tennessee – Racial and ethnic composition Note: the US Census treats Hispanic/Latino as an ethnic category. This table excludes Latinos from the racial categories and assigns them to a separate category. Hispanics/Latinos may be of any race.
Race / Ethnicity (NH = Non-Hispanic)	Pop 2000	Pop 2010	Pop 2020	% 2000	% 2010	% 2020
White alone (NH)	11,163	12,617	13,017	94.95%	85.21%	72.77%
Black or African American alone (NH)	136	208	262	1.16%	1.40%	1.46%
Native American or Alaska Native alone (NH)	40	68	50	0.34%	0.46%	0.28%
Asian alone (NH)	105	184	385	0.89%	1.24%	2.15%
Native Hawaiian or Pacific Islander alone (NH)	2	2	8	0.02%	0.01%	0.04%
Other race alone (NH)	2	20	74	0.02%	0.14%	0.41%
Mixed race or Multiracial (NH)	119	190	626	1.01%	1.28%	3.50%
Hispanic or Latino (any race)	190	1,518	3,467	1.62%	10.25%	19.38%
Total	11,757	14,807	17,889	100.00%	100.00%	100.00%

=== 2020 census ===
As of the 2020 census, Sevierville had a population of 17,889, 7,367 households, and 3,949 families. The median age was 38.8 years; 22.1% of residents were under the age of 18 and 20.0% were 65 years of age or older. For every 100 females there were 91.2 males, and for every 100 females age 18 and over there were 87.6 males age 18 and over.

95.8% of residents lived in urban areas, while 4.2% lived in rural areas.

Of the 7,367 households in Sevierville, 29.0% had children under the age of 18 living in them. Of all households, 40.5% were married-couple households, 18.3% were households with a male householder and no spouse or partner present, and 33.3% were households with a female householder and no spouse or partner present. About 31.5% of all households were made up of individuals and 15.0% had someone living alone who was 65 years of age or older.

There were 9,260 housing units, of which 20.4% were vacant. The homeowner vacancy rate was 1.5% and the rental vacancy rate was 7.7%.

Racial composition as of the 2020 census
Race	Number	Percent
White	13,629	76.2%
Black or African American	277	1.5%
American Indian and Alaska Native	94	0.5%
Asian	391	2.2%
Native Hawaiian and Other Pacific Islander	8	0.0%
Some other race	1,865	10.4%
Two or more races	1,625	9.1%

=== 2010 census ===
As of the 2010 United States census, Sevierville had 14,807 people, 5,979 households, and 3,706 families residing in the city. The population density was 613.5 inhabitants per square mile (236.9/km^{2}). There were 7,764 housing units at an average density of 321.7 per square mile (124.2/km^{2}). The racial makeup of the city was 88.9% White, 1.5% African American, 0.6% Native American, 1.3% Asian, 0% Pacific Islander, 6.1% from other races, and 1.7% from two or more races. Hispanic or Latino of any race accounted for 10.3% of the population.

Of the 5,979 households, 29.9% had children under the age of 18 living with them, 43.1% were married couples living together, 13.6% had a female householder with no husband present, 5.3% had a male householder with no wife present, and 38% were non-families. 31.8% of all households were made up of individuals living alone, and 15% of those living alone were 65 years of age or older. The average household size was 2.35, and the average family size was 2.9.

The population consisted of 24.4% of individuals under the age of 20, 7.2% from 20 to 24, 26.5% from 25 to 44, 24% from 45 to 64, and 17.9% who were 65 years of age or older. The median age was 38.2 years. For every 100 females, there were 91.6 males. For every 100 females age 18 and over, there were 87.3 males.

According to 2012–2016 American Community Survey 5-Year Estimates conducted by the U.S. Census Bureau, the median income for a household in Sevierville was $37,784, and the median income for a family was $39,840. Males had a median income of $32,404 versus $29,172 for females. The per capita income for the city was $21,779. About 18.7% of families and 23.3% of the population were living below the poverty line, including 34.8% of those under age 18 and 8.7% of those age 65 or older.

== Economy ==
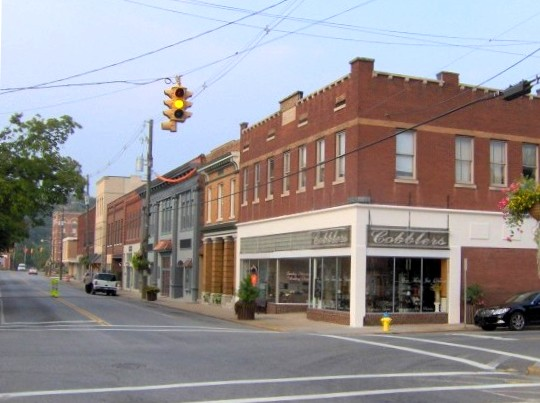
Court Avenue, developed in 1901 as part of Sevierville's new commercial district

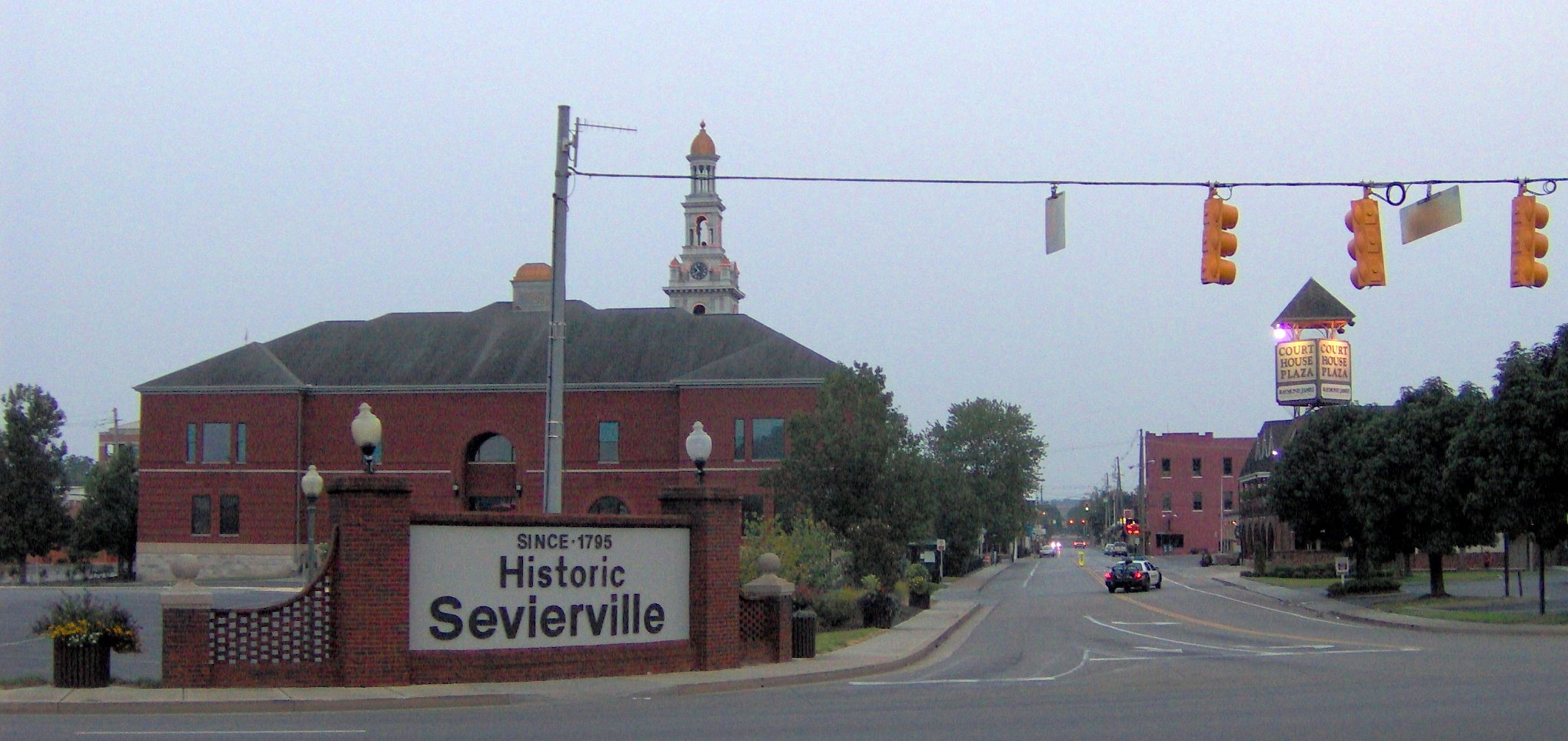
Sevierville Commercial District

Like other towns situated along the Parkway in Sevier County, Sevierville has reaped the benefits of the burgeoning tourism industry brought on by the development of Great Smoky Mountains National Park. As of 2004, nearly 50 percent of businesses based in Sevierville were linked to tourism. For example, there are more than 2,000 hotel and motel rooms in the city that generate more than $500,000 in hotel-motel tax revenues each year. There are a large number of cabins available as short term rentals in Sevierville.

In 2004, Sevierville established a Tourism Development Zone (TDZ) of 3 square miles (7.8 km^{2}) to improve the central business district, funded by $150 million in bond sales between 2004 and 2008 (equivalent to $240 million in 2025). Sales tax revenues received from businesses in the TDZ are earmarked for bond payments, while property taxes are often rebated to help developers pay for their development projects in the TDZ.

East Tennessee Radio Group owns and operates the Sevierville area's primary local radio stations, WPFT-FM 106.3 and FM 105.5. Also, WWST-FM 102.1, a Top 40 music station serving the Knoxville market, is licensed by the Federal Communications Commission (FCC) to Sevierville.

== Arts and culture ==
=== Annual cultural events ===
- Bloomin' Barbeque & Bluegrass Festival
- Dumplin Valley Bluegrass Festival
- Corvette Expo
- Sevier County Fair
- Shadrack's Christmas Wonderland
- Sevierville's Annual Christmas Parade

=== Tourism ===
- Burchfiel Grove Memorial Arboretum
- AdventureWorks Climb Zip Swing
- Forbidden Caverns
- Sevier Air Trampoline Park
- Douglas Dam
- Rainforest Adventures Discovery Zoo
- FoxFire Mountain Adventure Park
- Sevier County Heritage Museum
- Tennessee Museum of Aviation
- Scenic Helicopter Tours
- Tennessee Mountain Paintball
- NASCAR Speedpark
- Sky High Air Tours
- Tanger Outlets
- Smoky Mountain Knife Works & National Knife Museum

The following are located in the Kodak area of North Sevierville:

- Great Smokies Flea Market
- Smokies Stadium
- Buc-ee's, the 2nd biggest as of 2026

== Education ==
Sevierville is served by the Sevier County public school system. The educational system consists of the following public institutions:

- Elementary-Grammar level:
  - Sevierville Primary School – Grades: Kindergarten-Second
  - Sevierville Intermediate School – Grades: Third-Fifth
  - T. Lawson Early Childhood – Grades: Pre-Kindergarten-Kindergarten
- Elementary-Grammar/Junior High level:
  - Catons Chapel Elementary School – Grades: Kindergarten-Eighth
  - New Center Elementary School – Grades: Kindergarten-Eighth
- Junior High level:
  - Sevierville Middle School – Grades: Sixth-Eighth
- Junior High/Secondary level:
  - Hardin Alternative Learning Center – Grades: Seventh-Twelfth
  - Parkway Academy – Grades: Sixth-Twelfth
- Secondary level:
  - Sevier County High School – Grades: Ninth-Twelfth

Sevierville is also home to the following private institutions:

- Elementary-Grammar level:
  - Riverside Academy – Grades: Pre-Kindergarten-Fourth; Enrollment: 35
- Elementary-Grammar/Junior High/Secondary level:
  - Covenant Christian Academy – Grades: Pre-Kindergarten-Twelfth; Enrollment: 450
  - St. Andrew's School – Grades: Third-Twelfth; Enrollment: 26
- Ungraded:
  - New Center Christian School – Enrollment: 11

In addition to the preceding institutions, Sevierville is home to the Sevier County satellite campus of Walters State Community College, based in Morristown, Tennessee. King University, based in Bristol, Tennessee, also operates a satellite campus in Sevierville at the Walters State Community College location.

== Notable people ==
- Irene Bailey Baker (1901–1994): A former U.S. Representative for the 2nd District in Tennessee, Baker was born and raised in Sevierville.
- Reese Bowen Brabson (1817–1863): Brabson was a former member of the Tennessee House of Representatives and a U.S. Representative for Tennessee's 3rd district. Brabson's Ferry Plantation near Sevierville is on the National Register of Historic Places.
- Lewis Buckner (1856–1924): Enslaved before the Civil War, Buckner became a carpenter and furniture maker after abolition. Two of the homes he built in Sevierville in Sevier County – Riley H. Andes House and Trotter-Waters House – are on the National Register of Historic Places.
- Kristian Bush (1970–): Raised in Sevierville, Bush is one half of country duo Sugarland (with Jennifer Nettles) and the great-grandson of the founder of Bush Brothers and Company (the makers of Bush Beans).
- Bruce Connatser (1902–1971): Born in Sevierville, Connatser played first base for Major League Baseball's Cleveland Indians.
- Andrew E. Farmer (1979–): A current member (2018) of the Tennessee House of Representatives from the 17th district, Farmer is a resident of Sevierville.
- Robert H. Hodsden (1806–1864): A planter and doctor who provided medical care along the Trail of Tears, Hodsden served as President of the East Tennessee Medical Society and spent several terms in the Tennessee House of Representatives. His former home near Sevierville, Rose Glen, is on the National Register of Historic Places.
- Jason Layman (1973–): Born and raised in Sevierville, Layman played college football for the Tennessee Volunteers and was drafted as an offensive lineman for the Houston Oilers in the National Football League.
- Roy Hardee "Red" Massey (1890–1954): A Major League Baseball player who played one season for the Boston Braves, Massey was born in Sevierville.
- Zachary D. Massey (1864–1923): Throughout his life, Massey served as a U.S. Representative for Tennessee's 1st district, a senator in the Tennessee Senate, and postmaster of Sevierville.
- The McCarters: The vocal country music trio consisting of Jennifer, Lisa, and Teresa McCarter grew up in Sevierville.
- John Porter McCown (1815–1879): Born near Sevierville, McCown was a career soldier in the U.S. Army who resigned to join the Confederate Army during the American Civil War. He also fought in the Seminole Wars and the Mexican-American War.
- Richard Montgomery (1946–): A former member of the Tennessee House of Representatives from the 12th district, Montgomery was born in Sevierville and served on the Sevier County Board of Education for 16 years.
- Dolly Parton (1946–2026): Country music star Dolly Parton had composed more than 3,000 songs throughout her career and was inducted into the Country Music Hall of Fame. Sevierville was her home town.
- Randy Parton (1953–2021): The younger brother of Dolly Parton, Randy was a country singer, songwriter, and actor.
- Stella Parton (1949–): The younger sister of Dolly Parton, Stella is also a country singer and songwriter.
- Cecil T. Patterson (1930–2002): Born in Sevierville, Patterson introduced the Wadō-ryū style of karate into the Eastern United States in 1958 and later established the United States Eastern Wadō-ryū Federation.
- Isaac Thomas (1784–1859): An early U.S. Representative for Tennessee's 3rd district, Thomas was born in Sevierville.
- Gary R. Wade: A former mayor of Sevierville (1977–1987), Wade also served on the Tennessee Court of Criminal Appeals and the Tennessee Supreme Court.
- Ella May Wiggins (1900–1929): A ballad writer and union organizer for the National Textile Workers Union, Wiggins was murdered during the Loray Mill Strike in North Carolina. She was born in Sevierville.

== Bibliography ==
- McHugh, Dick; Mitch Moore (2005). Insider's Guide to the Great Smoky Mountains. Guilford, Connecticut: Globe Pequot Press. ISBN 0-7627-3504-X.
- Dennis, Delmar D. (1995). The Fact Book of the Great Smokies. Norris, Tennessee: Covenant House Books. ISBN 0-925591-32-7.
- Jones, Robbie (1997). The Historic Architecture of Sevier County, Tennessee. Sevierville, Tennessee: Smoky Mountain Historical Society. ISBN 1-890150-00-2.
