= Sevierville Masonic Lodge =

- Formerly listed on the U.S. National Register of Historic Places
- Location within Tennessee Location within the United States
- Location: 119 Main St., Sevierville, Tennessee
- Coordinates: 35°52′6″N 83°33′50″W
- Area: less than one acre
- Built: 1893
- Architect: Murphy, W.C.; Garland J.R.
- NRHP reference No.: 80003855

Significant dates
- Added to NRHP: February 7, 1980
- Removed from NRHP: April 12, 2022

The Sevierville Masonic Lodge was a historic building in Sevierville, Tennessee. Constructed in 1893, it was used as a meeting hall for a local Masonic lodge. During 1928–1968, the Sevierville Public Library occupied the first floor, at no charge. The Masons moved out and the building was sold at auction in 1973 to a bank which made renovations.

It was listed on the National Register of Historic Places in 1980. The building was demolished in 2006 for a parking lot, and was removed from the National Register in 2022
