= Rose Glen (Sevierville, Tennessee) =

Historic house in Tennessee, United States

- U.S. National Register of Historic Places
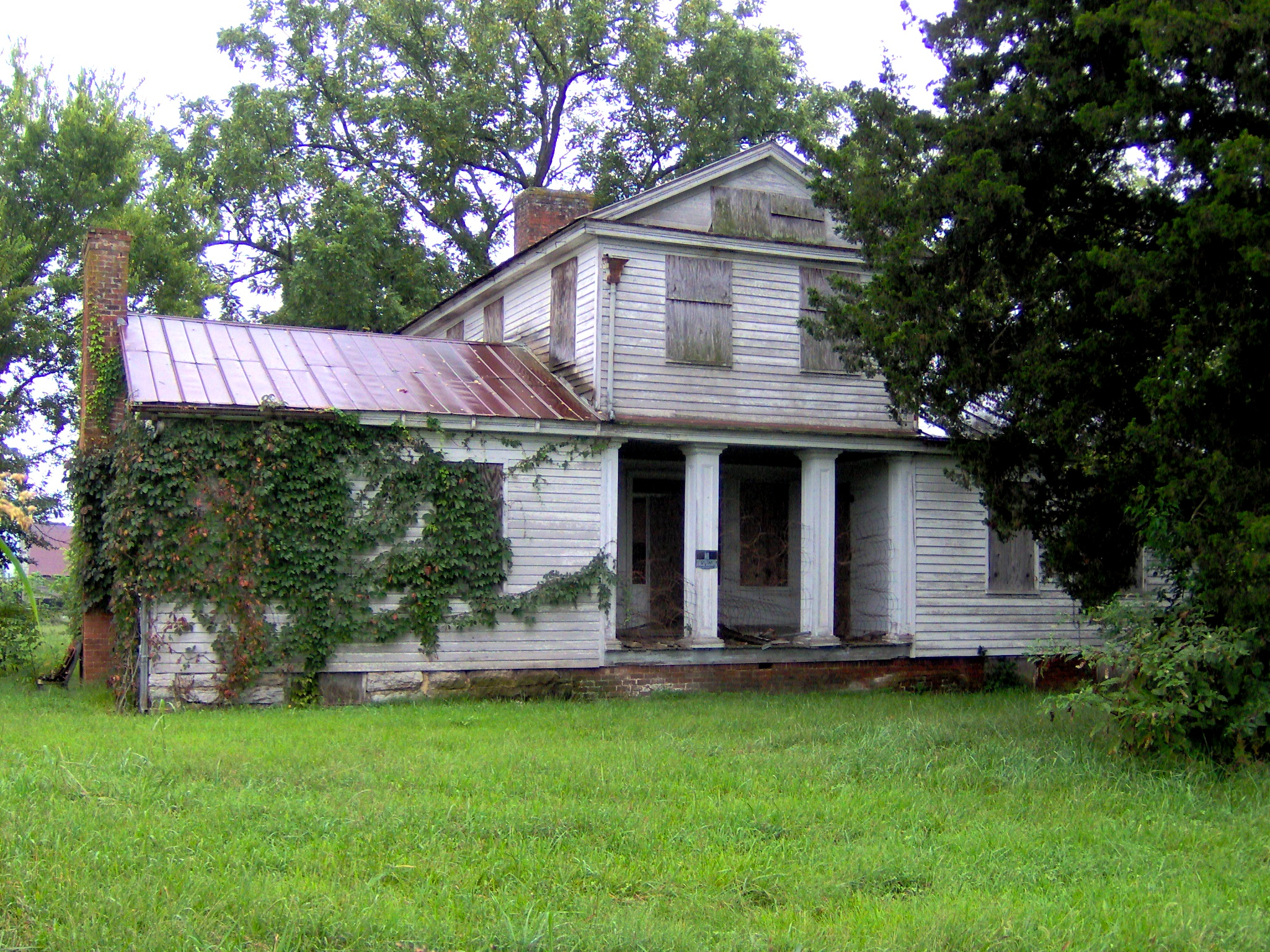
- Front facade of the house at Rose Glen

- Location within Tennessee Location within the United States
- Interactive map showing the location of Rose Glen
- Location: 1801 Old Newport Highway; Sevierville, Tennessee
- Coordinates: 35°51′34″N 83°29′58″W
- Area: 8 acres (3.2 ha)
- Built: 1850
- Architect: Dr. Robert Hodsden
- NRHP reference No.: 75001781
- Added to NRHP: July 18, 1975

Rose Glen was an antebellum plantation in Sevierville, Tennessee. At its height, Rose Glen was one of the largest and most lucrative farms in East Tennessee. While the farm is no longer operational, the plantation house and several outbuildings—including a physician's office, loom house, and double-cantilever barn—have survived intact and have been placed on the National Register of Historic Places.

Rose Glen was established in the late 1840s in rural Sevier County by Dr. Robert Hatton Hodsden, a physician and politician who by 1860 had become one of the county's wealthiest individuals. Hodsden was an attending physician for the Cherokee Removal (commonly called the Trail of Tears) in the late 1830s, and between 1841 and 1845 he represented Blount County in the Tennessee state legislature. Although he was a slave owner, Hodsden was staunchly pro-Union during the American Civil War and was a member of the Sevier County delegation at the East Tennessee Convention in Greeneville in 1861. Rose Glen is owned and maintained by Hodsden's descendants.

== Location ==
Rose Glen is located at the junction of Tennessee State Route 416 (Pittman Center Road) and Old Newport Highway, a few miles east of Sevierville near the Harrisburg community. The house lot and surrounding land (much of which is still undeveloped) are situated on the east bank of the Middle Prong Little Pigeon River, about a half-mile south of the river's strategic confluence with the East Prong to form the Little Pigeon River proper. The house lot is across the street from the Walters State Sevier County Campus.

== History ==
=== Robert Hodsden ===
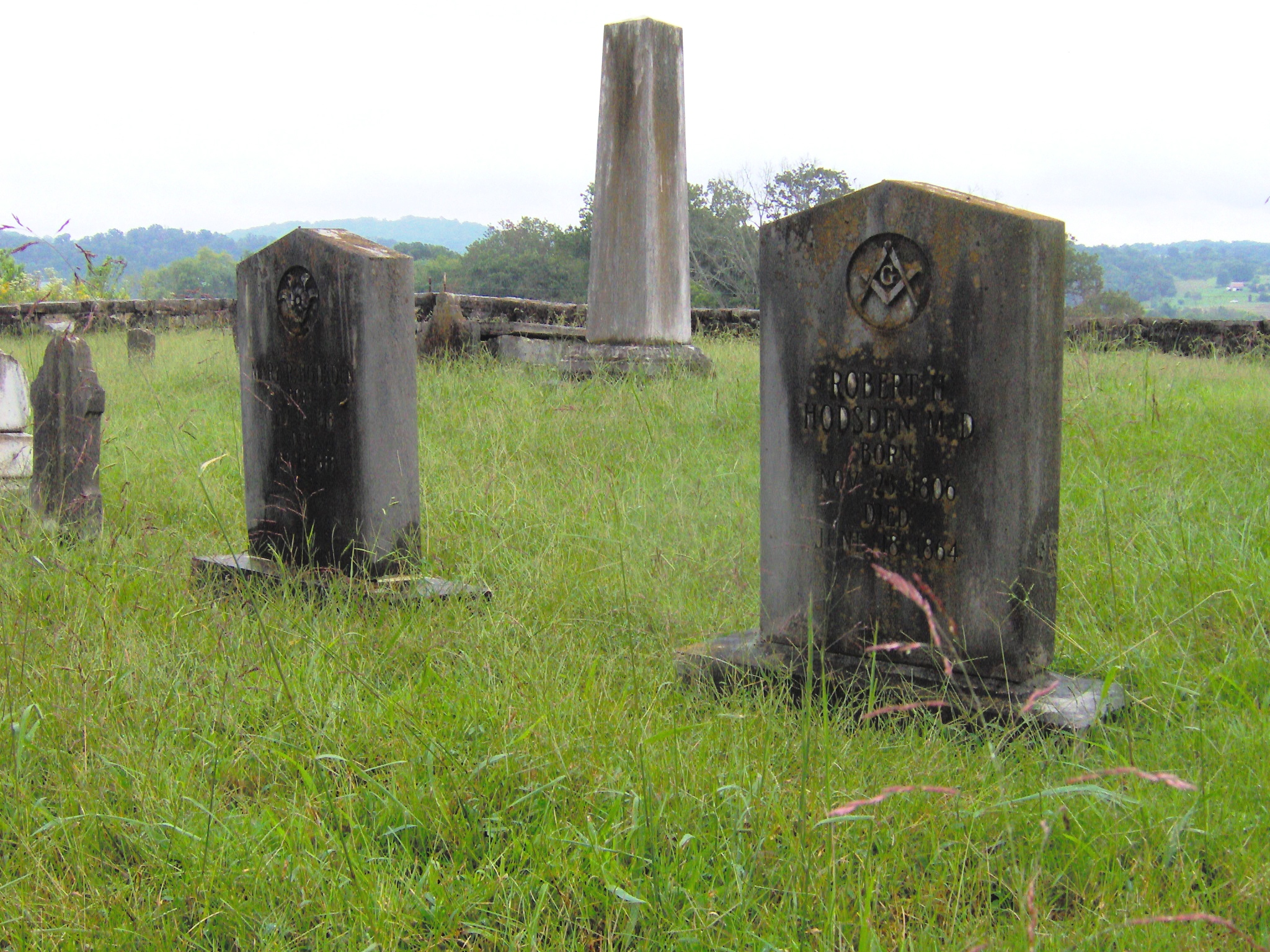
Graves of Robert Hodsden (right) and daughter Mary Pasteur Hodsden Hicks at Brabson Cemetery

Born in Smithfield, Virginia, in 1806, Robert H. Hodsden initially worked as a tailor in various cities across the country before he decided to study medicine. After obtaining his medical degree from Jefferson Medical College in Philadelphia in 1833, Hodsden joined the practice of James Gillespie in Maryville, Tennessee. He married his first wife, Elizabeth Hook (d. 1842), in 1832. In 1838 Hodsden was appointed attending physician for the Cherokee removal, known commonly as the "Trail of Tears." A member of the Whig Party, Hodsden was elected to the Tennessee state legislature in 1841, where he represented Blount County for four years. In 1843, after the death of his first wife, Hodsden married a widow, Mary Brabson-Shields (1818–1888), whose father, John Brabson, had established the Brabson's Ferry Plantation at Boyds Creek and had given his daughter what is now Rose Glen as a gift for her first wedding. Hodsden and Brabson-Shields initially resided in Maryville but eventually moved to Rose Glen, where they completed the current plantation house and villa in 1850. In the decade after the completion of Rose Glen, Hodsden served as the first president of the East Tennessee Medical Society and helped establish Sevier County's first masonic society.

Although he was a slave owner and had married into the pro-secession Brabson family, Hodsden remained a staunch Union supporter throughout the Civil War. In 1861, he represented Sevier County at the East Tennessee Union Convention in June and in November was imprisoned after Confederate authorities accused him of aiding Unionist guerillas in the destruction of several railroad bridges across the Tennessee Valley. Hodsden was eventually released and returned to Rose Glen, where he died of heart failure on June 18, 1864. Despite the rift the war had created between Hodsden and his in-laws, Hodsden was buried in the Brabson Cemetery at Brabson's Ferry Plantation.

=== Rose Glen ===
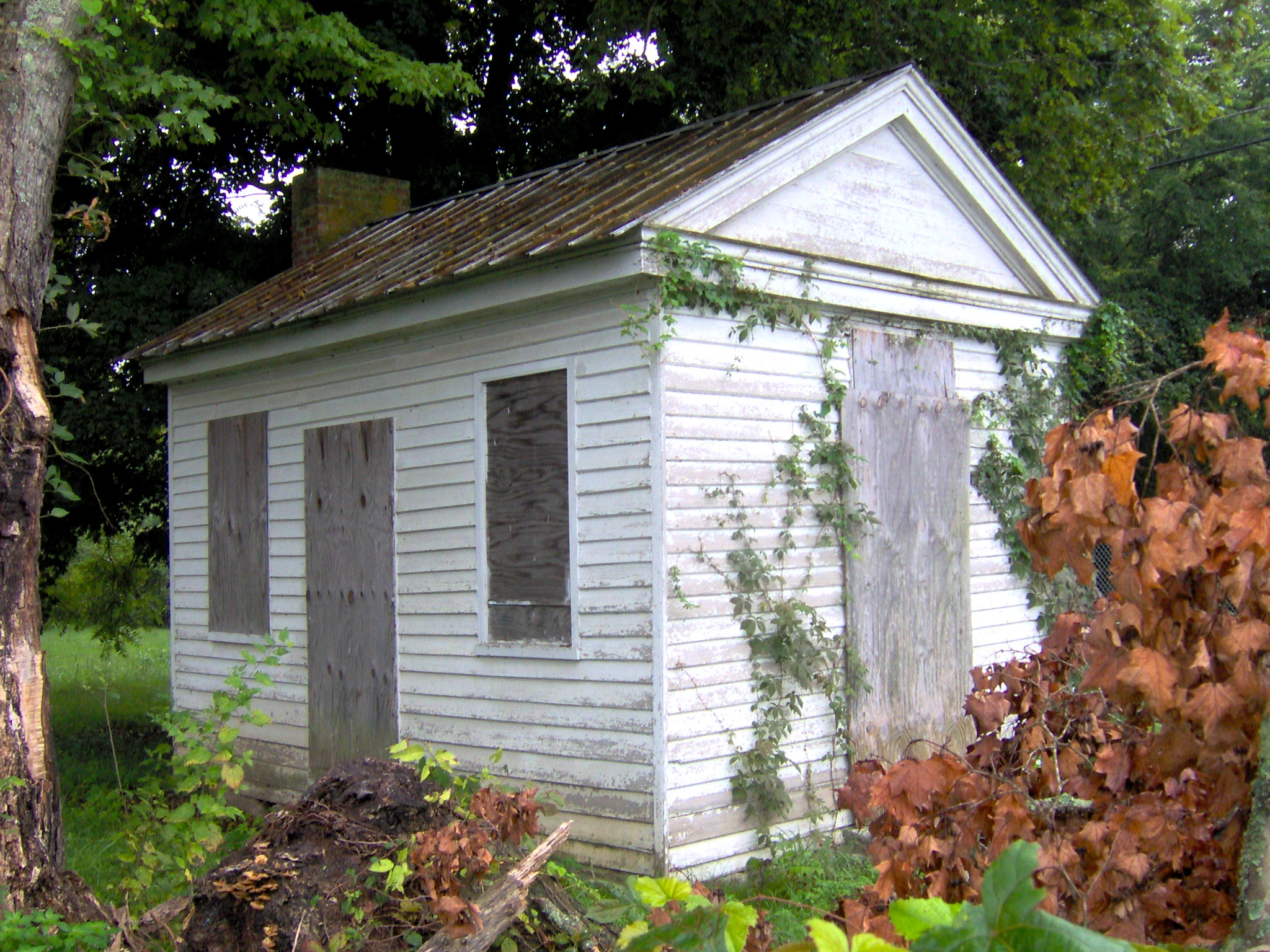
Hodsden's office at Rose Glen

In the early 19th century, what is now Rose Glen was part of a farm known simply as the "Bush place," which had been established by early settler George Bush. By the 1830s, John Brabson had become the owner of Bush place, and when Brabson's daughter Mary married David Shields in 1837, Brabson gave them the Bush place as a wedding gift. Shields built a house at the Bush farm, which he called "Rose Glen," but he died suddenly in 1839. In 1843, Mary Brabson-Shields married Hodsden, and Hodsden thus assumed ownership of the Bush place. In 1846, Hodsden and his wife began building the present house and villa at Rose Glen, which they completed in 1850.

By 1860, Rose Glen had grown to 2,377 acres (962 ha), making it by far the most valuable farm in Sevier County. Livestock at Rose Glen included 14 horses, 37 cattle, 67 sheep, four oxen, and 180 hogs. Hodsden and 15 slaves produced 3,400 bushels of oats, 360 bushels of wheat, 50 bushels of sweet potatoes, 18 tons of hay, 100 pounds of wool, 300 gallons of molasses, and over 3,000 pounds of butter. Rose Glen's 1,200 pounds of rice was one of the largest rice crops in East Tennessee. The plantation also had a small winery.

On January 27, 1864, Rose Glen was a strategic point in a skirmish known as the Battle of Fair Garden, fought between Union forces led by Colonel Edward McCook and Confederate forces led by Major-General William Martin (Martin was helping to cover James Longstreet's retreat after the Siege of Knoxville). In 1873, Abraham Jackson Hicks (1841–1903) took control of Rose Glen when he married Hodsden's daughter, Mary Pasteur Hodsden (1854–1942). After Hicks' death, Rose Glen passed to eldest his son, John Hodsden Hicks (1874–1948).

== Structures ==
=== Rose Glen house ===
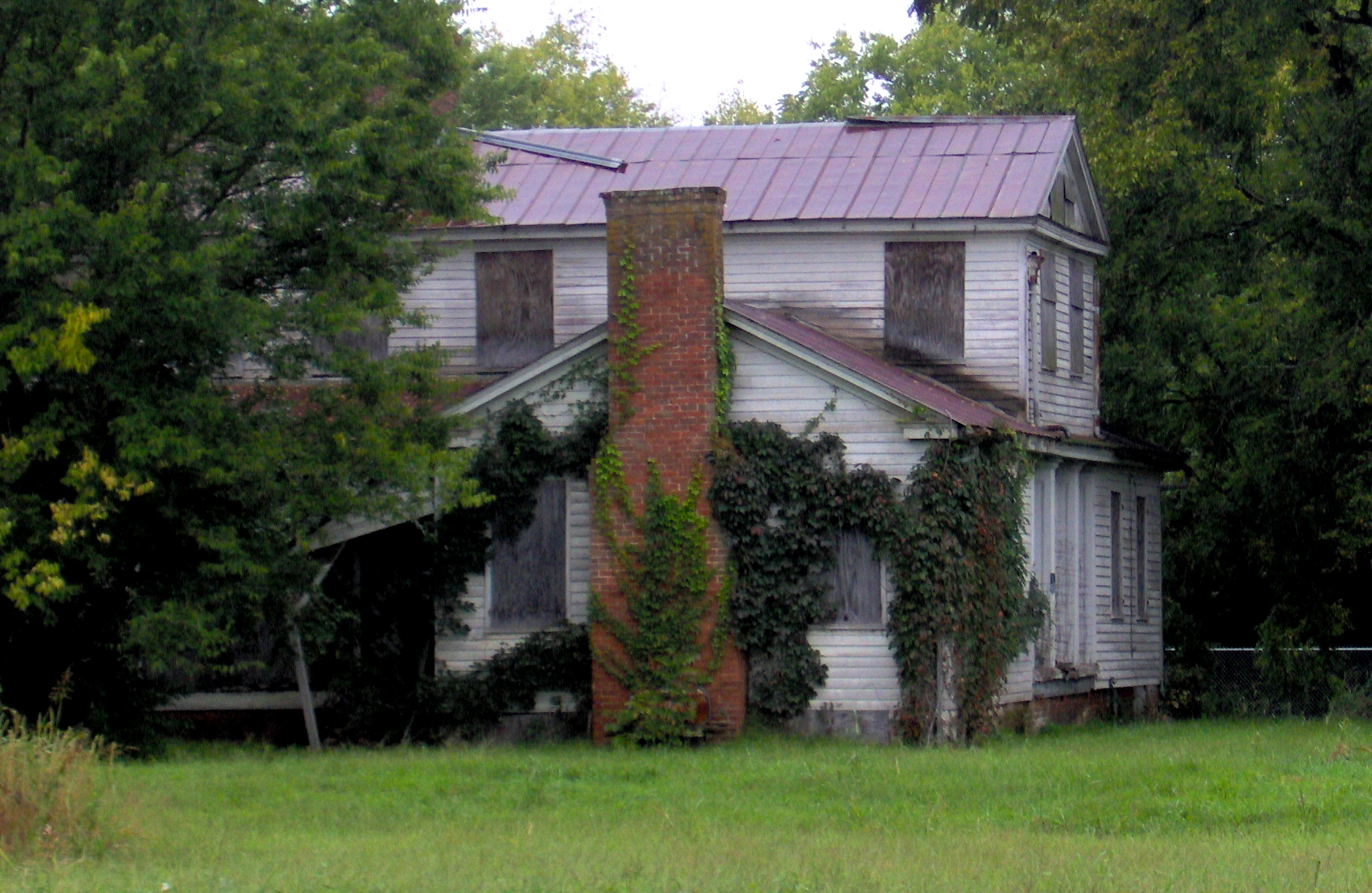
East end of the house at Rose Glen

Historian Robbie Jones calls the house at Rose Glen the "most impressive antebellum house ever constructed in Sevier County." The house is a tripartite Greek Revival home consisting of a two-story central block flanked by one-story wings. The front facade of the central block includes a recessed portico supported by square Doric columns. Enclosed porches are located on both sides of the rear of the central block. The house rests on a mostly limestone foundation, although the west wing rests on a brick foundation (possibly left over from the earlier Shields house). A split-run staircase in one of the rear porches provides access to the second story of the central block, which contains three bedrooms. The house has three cellars, one of which (under the central block) was used as a kitchen, and has three brick chimneys with post-and-lintel mantels.

The design of Rose Glen was modeled after architect Minard Lafever's "Design for a Country Villa," which appears in both Lafever's Modern Builders Guide (1833) and Beauties of Modern Architecture (1835). The design called for a "five-part" villa, consisting of the central block and two wings, and two symmetrically placed outbuildings aligned with the house's northeast and northwest corners. At Rose Glen, these two outbuildings—which were used as an office and a loom house—were connected to the main house by flower-lined walkways. The loom house and office have designs that match the house, with the same clapboarding and brick chimneys. A rose garden was maintained in the space between the outbuildings and the main house.

=== Outbuildings ===
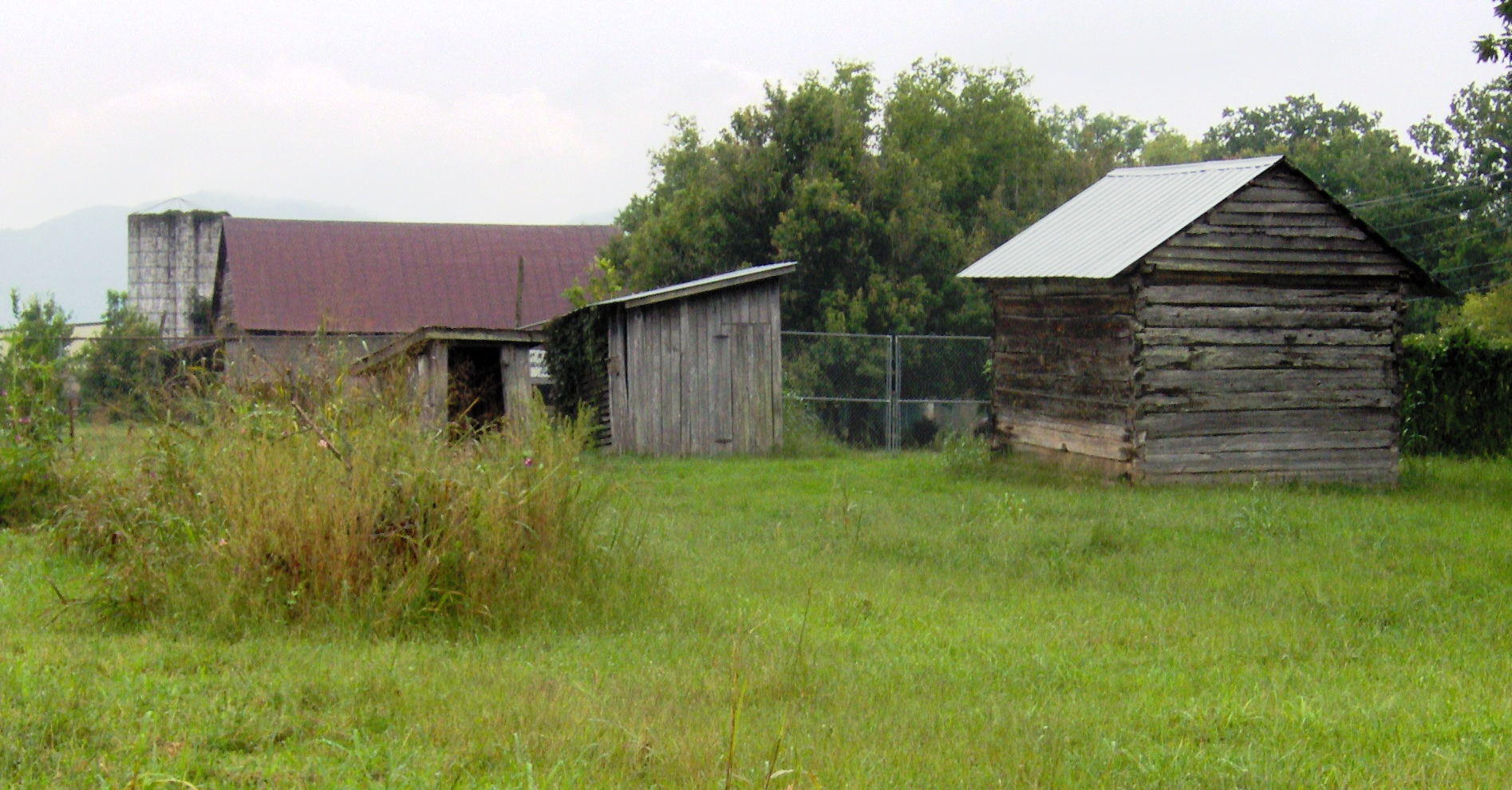
Outbuildings at Rose Glen, showing silo and cantilever barn in the distance on the left, the outhouse and corn crib in the center, and the smokehouse on the right

Along with the loom house and Hodsden's office, which was built as part of the "country villa," surviving outbuildings at Rose Glen include a double-cantilever barn, smokehouse, springhouse/well-house, a hay barn, a concrete silo, and an outhouse. Hodsden added the smokehouse, Hodsden's son-in-law Abraham Hicks probably built the springhouse and double-cantilever barn, and Hodsden's grandson John Hodsden Hicks added the corn crib, silo, and rack-sided barn.

The smokehouse, constructed around 1850, is built of hewn logs and is accessed by a board and batten door with iron hinges. The double-cantilever barn, built late-19th century, is a double-pen barn retaining much of its original cantilevered form, although a tractor shed was later added to the barn. The hay barn, located across the street from the main house lot, is a rack-sided barn with a gambrel roof, built in the 1920s. Except for the smokehouse, all the outbuildings are frame structures.

== See also ==
- Wheatlands
