= Boyds Creek, Tennessee =

Boyds Creek
- Unincorporated community
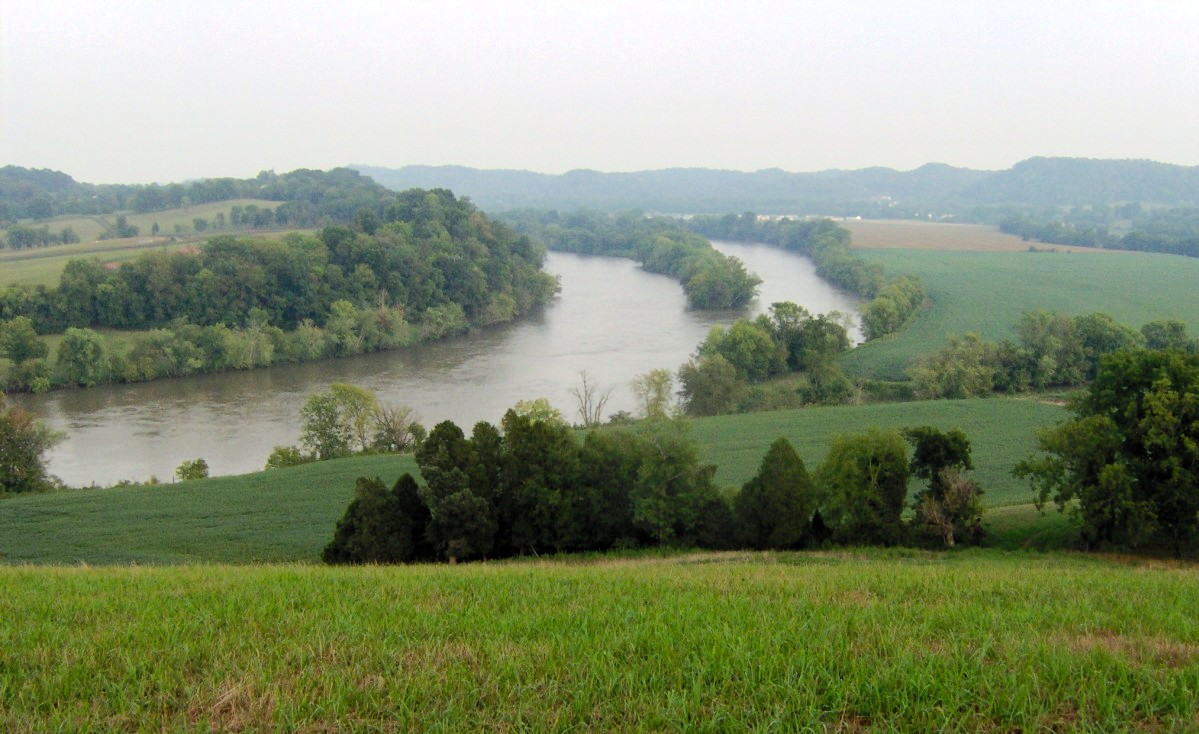
- The French Broad River and rural fringe in Boyds Creek

- Location within the state of Tennessee Boyds Creek (the United States)
- Coordinates: 35°55′24″N 83°39′33″W
- Country: United States
- State: Tennessee
- County: Sevier
- Elevation: 899 ft (274 m)
- Time zone: UTC-5 (Eastern (EST))
  - Summer (DST): UTC-4 (EDT)
- ZIP codes: 37862, 37876
- GNIS feature ID: 1314721

Boyds Creek is an unincorporated community in Sevier County, Tennessee, United States. It is named for a small southward-flowing tributary of the French Broad River of the same name, which itself derives its name from a Virginian trader, killed by a band of Cherokee people, whose body was thrown into the stream. The creek was the site of a 1780 battle (The Battle of Boyd's Creek) between white settlers and Cherokee angry at the settlers' encroachment onto their hunting territory.

== Geography ==
The community has a mean elevation of 899 feet (274 metres).
