= Waters House =

Waters House may refer to:

- Waters Farm, Sutton, Massachusetts, listed on the NRHP in Massachusetts
- Waters House (Fordyce, Arkansas), listed on the NRHP in Arkansas
- Waters House (Sevierville, Tennessee), listed on the NRHP in Tennessee
- Asa Waters Mansion, Millbury, Massachusetts, listed on the NRHP in Massachusetts
- Charles Clary Waters House, Little Rock, Arkansas, listed on the NRHP in Arkansas

== See also ==
- Waters Building (disambiguation)
