= Millbury =

Millbury may refer to:

- Millbury, Massachusetts
  - Millbury High School
- Millbury, Ohio
