= Albert Nash =

Albert Nash may refer to:

- Albert C. Nash (1826–1890), American architect
- Albert L. Nash (1921–2015), American politician and businessman
