= Heisman High School Scholarship =

Prestigious School Award

Current logo of the Heisman High School Scholarship

Old logo for Wendy's High School Heisman

The Heisman High School Scholarship, in the past known as Wendy's High School Heisman Memorial Trophy Award (also known as the Wendy's High School Heisman), named after former college football player and coach John Heisman, was a prestigious award in American high-school athletics. The spokesman was Archie Griffin, the only two-time Heisman Trophy recipient and current President/CEO of the Ohio State University Alumni Association. The award was discontinued after 2023.

== Overview and history ==
In 1994, the Heisman High School Scholarship was created to honor high school student-athletes. Each fall, the program recognizes the nation's most esteemed high-school-senior men and women for excellence in academics, athletics, and community involvement.

Each school can nominate one male and one female student-athlete per year. To date, there have been more than 136,000 nominees. The field of nominees is narrowed to 1,020 State Finalists, 10 male and 10 female per state (plus the District of Columbia), who are announced in late October. In early November, the field is narrowed to 102 State Winners, one male and one female from each state.

In mid-November, a judging panel selects 12 National Finalists, one male and one female from each of six geographical regions. Two National Winners, one male and one female, are selected from the National Finalists and are honored during ESPN's national telecast of the college Heisman Memorial Trophy on December 9. Of all the nominees, 145 have progressed to the National Finalist level, with 24 (two per year, one male and one female) earning the designation of Heisman High School Scholarship National Award Winners. The annual awards show is telecast on ESPN2.

== Eligibility ==
The nominee must have a grade point average of B (3.0) or better. They have to also be a leader in their school and in the community. Each nominee must participate in a sport which is at the program of the Olympic or Paralympic Games or a sport recognized by the National Federation of State High School Associations: Archery, Badminton, Baseball, Basketball, Biathlon, BMX Racing (or Freestyle), Bobsleigh, Boccia, Bowling, Boxing, Breaking, Canoeing/Rowing, Cross Country, Curling, Cycling, Dance, Diving, Equestrian (Dressage/Eventing/Jumping), Fencing, Field Hockey, Football, Futsal, Goalball, Golf, Gymnastics, Handball, Ice Hockey, Ice Skating (Figure or Speed), Judo, Karate, Lacrosse, Luge, Modern Pentathlon, Mountain Bike, Nordic Combined, Powerlifting, Rowing, Rugby, Sailing, Shooting, Skateboarding, Skeleton, Skiing (Alpine, Biathlon, Cross Country, Free-Style, Jumping), Snowboard, Soccer, Softball, Spirit/Cheerleading, Sport Climbing, Surfing, Swimming (or Synchronized), Table Tennis, Taekwondo, Tennis, Track & Field, Trampoline, Triathlon, Volleyball (or Beach), Water Polo, Weightlifting and Wrestling.

== Past winners ==
The program was created in 1994, with more than 6,200 nominations submitted in the first year from high schools nationwide. Since then, more than 150,000 students have been nominated.

Year	Male Winner	School	Hometown	Female Winner	School	Hometown
1994	Barrett Robinson	Chaminade-Julienne High School	Dayton, Ohio	Trisha Perry	Mansfield High School	Mansfield, Missouri
1995	Jeremy Royal	The Altamont School	Birmingham, Alabama	Jill Aholt	Linn High School	Linn, Missouri
1996	Chris Kirchhoff	Worthington Kilbourne High School	Worthington, Ohio	Erin Dromgoole	Millbury High School	Millbury, Massachusetts
1997	Blake Moore	Ogden High School	Ogden, Utah	Sarah Edwards	Sevier County High School	Sevierville, Tennessee
1998	Anthony White	Rosemead High School	San Gabriel, California	Kelly Landreth	McDowell High School	Marion, North Carolina
1999	Barrett Brandon	Lake Country Christian School	Fort Worth, Texas	Abby Miller	Green Valley High School	Henderson, Nevada
2000	David Donaldson	Walker High School	Jasper, Alabama	Kate O'Toole	Villa Madonna Academy	Crescent Springs, Kentucky
2001	Paul Corsello	Pittsford Mendon High School	Pittsford, New York	Megan May	Handley High School	Roanoke, Alabama
2002	Robert Huefner	McIntosh High School	Peachtree City, Georgia	Meghan O'Leary	Episcopal High School	Baton Rouge, Louisiana
2003	Chase Correia	Galena High School	Reno, Nevada	Ashley Wolf	Montville Township High School	Montville, New Jersey
2004	Andy Bratten	James M. Bennett High School	Salisbury, Maryland	Brenna Brucker	Bethel Park High School	Bethel Park, Pennsylvania
2005	William Jacobs	James Monroe High School	Fredericksburg, Virginia	Katie Zaeh	Governor Livingston High School	Berkeley Heights, New Jersey
2006	Samuel Finlayson	San Ramon Valley High School	Alamo, California	Kaylee Jamison	St. Charles North High School	St. Charles, Illinois
2007	Trevor Van Ackeren	Liberty High School	Bethlehem, Pennsylvania	Angela Duckworth	Desert Mountain High School	Scottsdale, Arizona
2008	Brett Leibowitz	The Meadows School	Las Vegas, Nevada	Kathy Kroeger	Independence High School	Franklin, Tennessee
2009	Kyle Pollock	Wiggins High School	Wiggins, Colorado	Malia Cali	Saint Thomas Aquinas High School	Hammond, Louisiana
2010	Rex Woodbury	Catalina Foothills High School	Tucson, Arizona	Gabrielle Badura	Clover Hill High School	Midlothian, Virginia
2011	Garrett Gosse	The Meadows School	Las Vegas, Nevada	Selena Pasadyn	Brunswick High School	Brunswick, Ohio
2012	Samuel Prakel	Versailles High School	Versailles, Ohio	Zoe Alaniz	W.B. Ray High School	Corpus Christi, Texas
2013	Andrew Miner	East Greenwich High School	East Greenwich, Rhode Island	Emily Granger	Saints Peter & Paul High School	Easton, Maryland
2014	Nolan Henry	Union High School	Vancouver, Washington	Lauren Van Vlierbergen	Harry D. Jacobs High School	Algonquin, Illinois
2015	Zach Hughes	Westminster Christian Academy	Town and Country, Missouri	Taylor Campos	Lemont Township High School	Lemont, Illinois
2016	Brent Priester, II	Christ The King Regional High School	Middle Village, New York	Frelicia Tucker	Aiken High School	Aiken, South Carolina
2017	Jackson Destine	Atlantic Community High School	Delray Beach, Florida	Soleil Gaylord	Telluride High School	Telluride, Colorado
2018	Sunjay Chawla	Pillow Academy	Greenwood, Mississippi	Lauren Eccles	Jefferson County High School	Dandridge, Tennessee
2019	Logan Alvarez	Miami Southridge Senior High School	Miami, Florida	Victoria Orcutt	Fort Walton Beach High School	Fort Walton Beach, Florida
2020	Grahm Tuohy-Gaydos	Green Mountain High School	Lakewood, Colorado	Caroline Orcutt	Fort Walton Beach High School	Fort Walton Beach, Florida
2021	Adom Appiah	Spartanburg Day School	Spartanburg, South Carolina	Dia Chawla	Pillow Academy	Greenwood, Mississippi
2022	Cameron Srivastava	Spartanburg Day School	Spartanburg, South Carolina	Viva Kreis	Belle Vernon Area High School	Belle Vernon, Pennsylvania
2023	George Cheng	North Carolina School of Science and Mathematics	Durham, North Carolina	Katelyn Matarese	La Cañada High School	La Cañada, California

== See also ==
- Mississippi Sports Hall of Fame & Museum ("Wendy's High School Gallery", which recognizes the Wendy's High School Heisman winners from Mississippi)
- Gatorade Player of the Year awards (in various sports)
- Dial Award (defunct)
- National High School Hall of Fame
