= Michael O. Moore =

American politician

Michael Moore
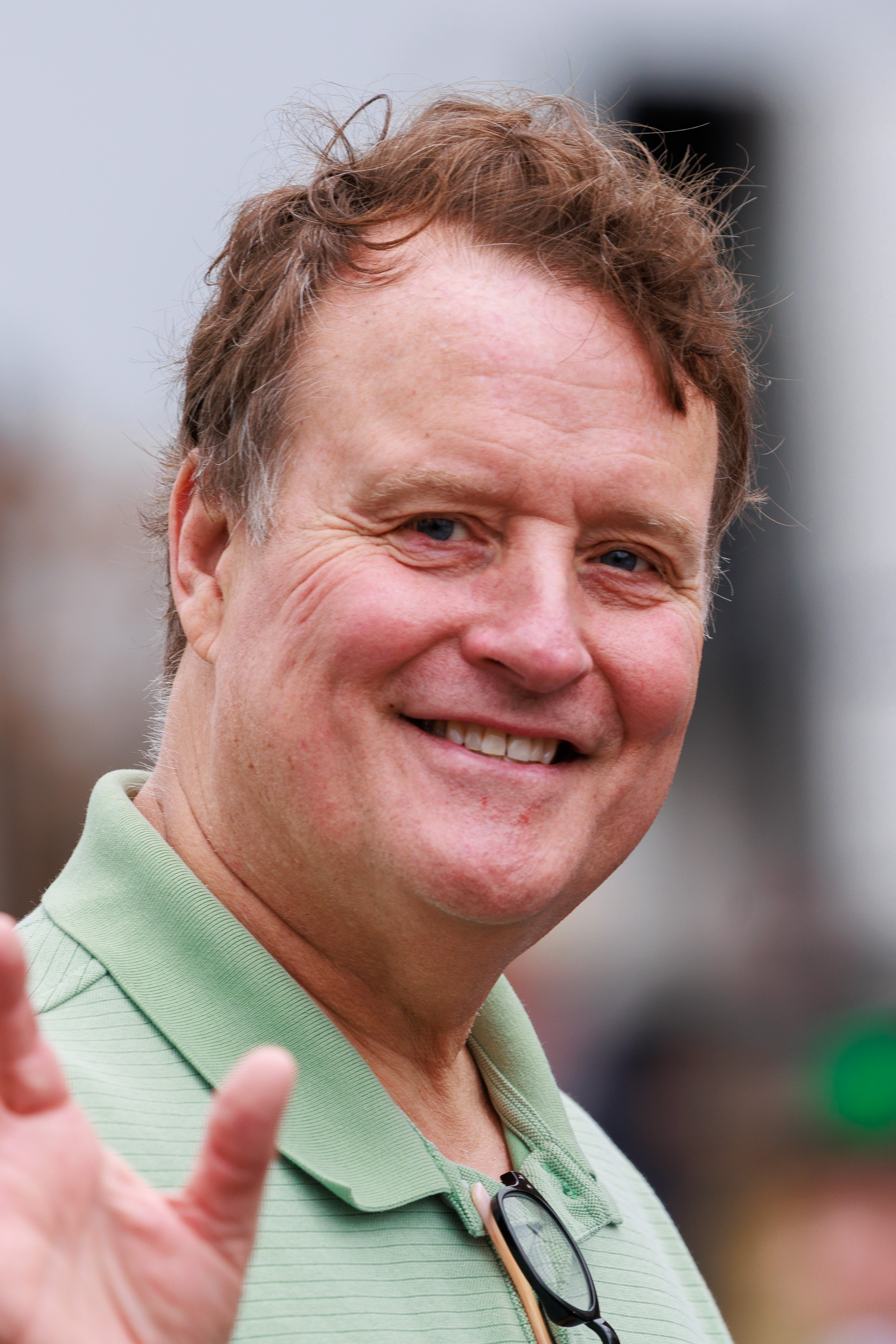
- Moore in 2025

Member of the Massachusetts Senate from the 2nd Worcester district
- Incumbent
- Assumed office January 7, 2009
- Preceded by: Edward M. Augustus Jr.

Personal details
- Born: January 17, 1963 (age 63) Millbury, Massachusetts, U.S.
- Party: Democratic
- Spouse: Jennifer Moore
- Children: 2
- Education: Quinsigamond Community College (BA); Western New England College (MCJ)
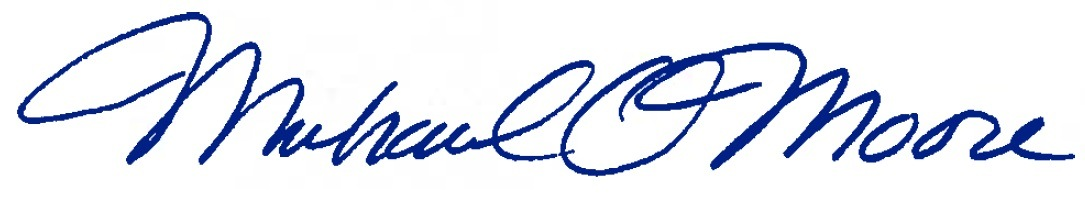
- Signature
- Website: Official website

Michael O. Moore (born January 17, 1963) is an American politician from Millbury, Massachusetts, who serves as the Massachusetts state senator for the Second Worcester District, comprising his hometown of Millbury and seven other communities including parts of the city of Worcester. He is member of the Democratic Party who has served in the Massachusetts Legislature since January 7, 2009.

== Education ==
Moore is a graduate of Millbury Memorial High School, Quinsigamond Community College and Western New England College. He holds a master's degree in criminal justice from Western New England College.

== Early career ==
Born and raised in the town of Millbury and a graduate of the Waltham Police Academy, he began his 22-year law enforcement career as a Massachusetts Environmental Police officer, eventually becoming an investigator in the Massachusetts Attorney General’s office.

In 2005, he was appointed Assistant Deputy Superintendent at the Worcester County Sheriff's office, where he oversaw the Community Service Program, inmate reintegration program, and senior citizen community outreach safety programs.

Moore was elected to the Millbury Board of Selectmen in 2001. In 2004, during his tenure on the board, The Shoppes at Blackstone Valley, the largest economic development project in Millbury history, opened, expanding the town's commercial tax base by approximately $1 million annually. He was re-elected to the Board of Selectmen in 2004 and 2007.

== Legislative career ==
Moore was elected to represent the people of the Second Worcester District in the Massachusetts Senate in November 2008, earning 60% of the vote.

During his first term, Moore chaired the Joint Committee on Community Development and Small Businesses, overseeing legislation to protect the Commonwealth's small and family-owned businesses. Moore also served as Vice Chair of the Joint Committee on Elder Affairs, and sat on the Joint Committee on Environment, Natural Resources and Agriculture, the Senate Committee on Bonding, Capital Expenditures, and State Assets, and the Senate Committee on Post Audit and Oversight.

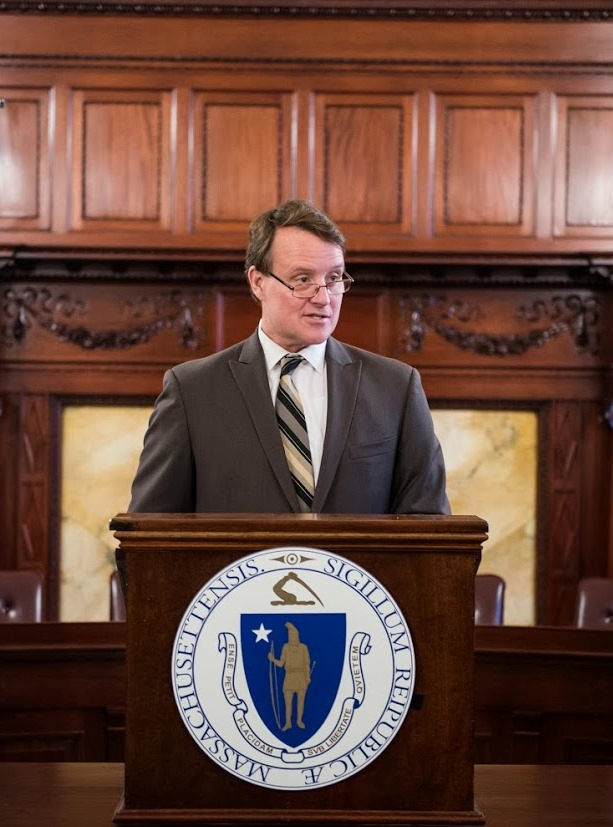
Moore speaks on the Massachusetts Senate floor, in 2015

Moore also serves on various boards and legislative advisory committees advocating for issues such as higher education, Central Massachusetts or issues of statewide importance for the. Currently, he serves on the advisory board for the Dr. Lillian R. Goodman Department of Nursing at Worcester State University, is a member of the Massachusetts Workforce Investment Board, acting-Senate Chairman of the Central Massachusetts Legislative Caucus, a member of the Biotech Caucus and a member of the Manufacturing Caucus. Moore is also a vice-chair of the Council of State Governments' Eastern Regional Conference's Education Committee. He also serves as the co-chairman of the Council of State Governments' Intergovernmental Affairs Committee and Chair of the Council of State Governments' Eastern Region Education Committee. He is a member of the New England Board of Higher Education Legislative Advisory Committee and serves on the Council of State Governments' Federalism Task Force and is a member of the Council of State Governments' International Committee.

=== Towns represented ===
Moore represents the Second Worcester District, comprising six communities in Central Massachusetts. The district includes the towns of Auburn, Grafton, Millbury, Shrewsbury, Westborough, and ward 4 precincts 1, 2A, 4, 5, 6, ward 5, ward 6, precincts 1, 2, 4, 5, 6, ward 7 precinct 5A, and ward 8 precinct 5 of the city of Worcester.

=== Current committee membership ===
Moore serves on nine legislative committees in the Massachusetts Legislature.

- Joint Committee on Higher Education (chair)
- Joint Committee on Public Safety and Homeland Security (Vice Chair)
- Senate Committee on Ways and Means
- Joint Committee on Ways and Means
- Joint Committee on Labor and Workforce Development
- Senate Committee on Intergovernmental Affairs
- Senate Committee on Post Audit and Oversight
- Senate Committee on Bonding, Capital Expenditures and State Assets
- Special Senate Committee on Opioid Addition Prevention, Treatment and Recovery Options

== See also ==
- 2019–2020 Massachusetts legislature
- 2021–2022 Massachusetts legislature
