= Courtney Cox Cole =

American athlete and basketball player

Courtney Cox Cole (March 15, 1971 – September 22, 2019) was an American athlete, chiefly known as a basketball player. In 2015 she was inducted into the Indiana Basketball Hall of Fame.

== High school ==
Cole was born Courtney Cox in Indiana to Dave and Jackie (Hare) Cox. She played basketball at Noblesville High School, where she led the Millers to three straight IHSAA State Finals appearances, highlighted by a state title in 1987 and a state runner-up finish in 1988. She contributed 17 points and 11 rebounds in the 1987 state finals victory and tallied 29 points in the 1988 finale. She ranks 27th on Indiana's career scoring chart with 1,869 points.

She won the Dial Award for the American high-school athlete/scholar of the year in 1988, and, in 1989, was named to USA Today’s All-USA high school girls basketball team, and to Parade magazine's All-American team.

== College career ==
Cole competed at the varsity level in both basketball and golf at Indiana University.

In two seasons (1989–1990, 1990–1991) of basketball for the Hoosiers, she started in 22 games, tallying 301 points and 71 assists.

Cole excelled on the golf course as well under coach Sam Carmichael. A four-year member of the IU golf team, Cole averaged a 78.94 while at Indiana. Cole earned All-Big Ten honors on three occasions and qualified for the NCAA Championship in 1993.

In the classroom, Cole collected one Academic All-Big Ten honor in basketball and three in golf. Cole graduated from Indiana in 1994 with a degree in finance and accounting.

== Later life ==
In 2008 she and her younger sister Monica Peck bought their parents out of a family-owned auto dealership in Noblesville, Hare Chevrolet, which they promoted as "Sisters of Savings" before selling it in 2017. Cole took the lead on the marketing side of the business, growing sales from 140 to 500 vehicles a month. The company originated as a wagon dealer in 1847.

== Death ==
In 2013, Cole was diagnosed with stage III lung cancer. A few years later, the cancer metastasized and spread, attaching itself as a tumor to her upper right bicep. Cole chronicled her cancer battle in a local newspaper.

On September 22, 2019, at age 48, Cole died at Riverview Hospital in Noblesville, Indiana, after being treated for a pulmonary embolism the prior week.
