= Goddard Rocket Launching Site =

- U.S. National Register of Historic Places
- U.S. National Historic Landmark

- Location within Massachusetts Location within the United States
- Location: Auburn, Massachusetts
- Coordinates: 42°13′6″N 71°48′46″W
- Built: 1926
- Architect: Dr. Robert H. Goddard
- NRHP reference No.: 66000654

Significant dates
- Added to NRHP: November 13, 1966
- Designated NHL: November 13, 1966

The Goddard Rocket Launching Site is a National Historic Landmark commemorating the launch site of the world's first successful liquid-fueled rocket.

== History ==
Dr. Robert H. Goddard launched his historic rocket on March 16, 1926, from what was then the Asa Ward Farm. The 10-foot (3.0 m) rocket reached an altitude of 41 feet (12 m), flew for two-and-a-half seconds, and fell to the ground 184 feet (56 m) from the launching frame.

Goddard's final launch from Auburn, on July 17, 1929, was also a historic first. The 11-foot (3.4 m) rocket carried an aneroid barometer, thermometer, and a camera triggered when the parachute opened. All three instruments operated successfully and were recovered. The rocket achieved a maximum altitude of 90 feet (27 m) in an 18.5-second flight covering a distance of 171 feet (52 m).

The site was declared a National Historic Landmark in 1966.

== Location ==
The site is located at 20 Upland Street, Auburn, Massachusetts, within the Pakachoag Golf Course. The launch site is indicated with two markers accessible to visitors while the golf course is open. An obelisk marking the launch site itself is about 1000 feet (300 m) southeast of Upland Street at the "9th Fairway, between Tee and Green," of the Pakachoag Golf Course. This marker may be difficult to access due to the nature of golf. The best advice for visiting is to walk the rock wall between 1st and 9th fairways. A second marker, rectangular in shape, is just off Upland Street in the northwest corner of the golf course.

== Gallery ==
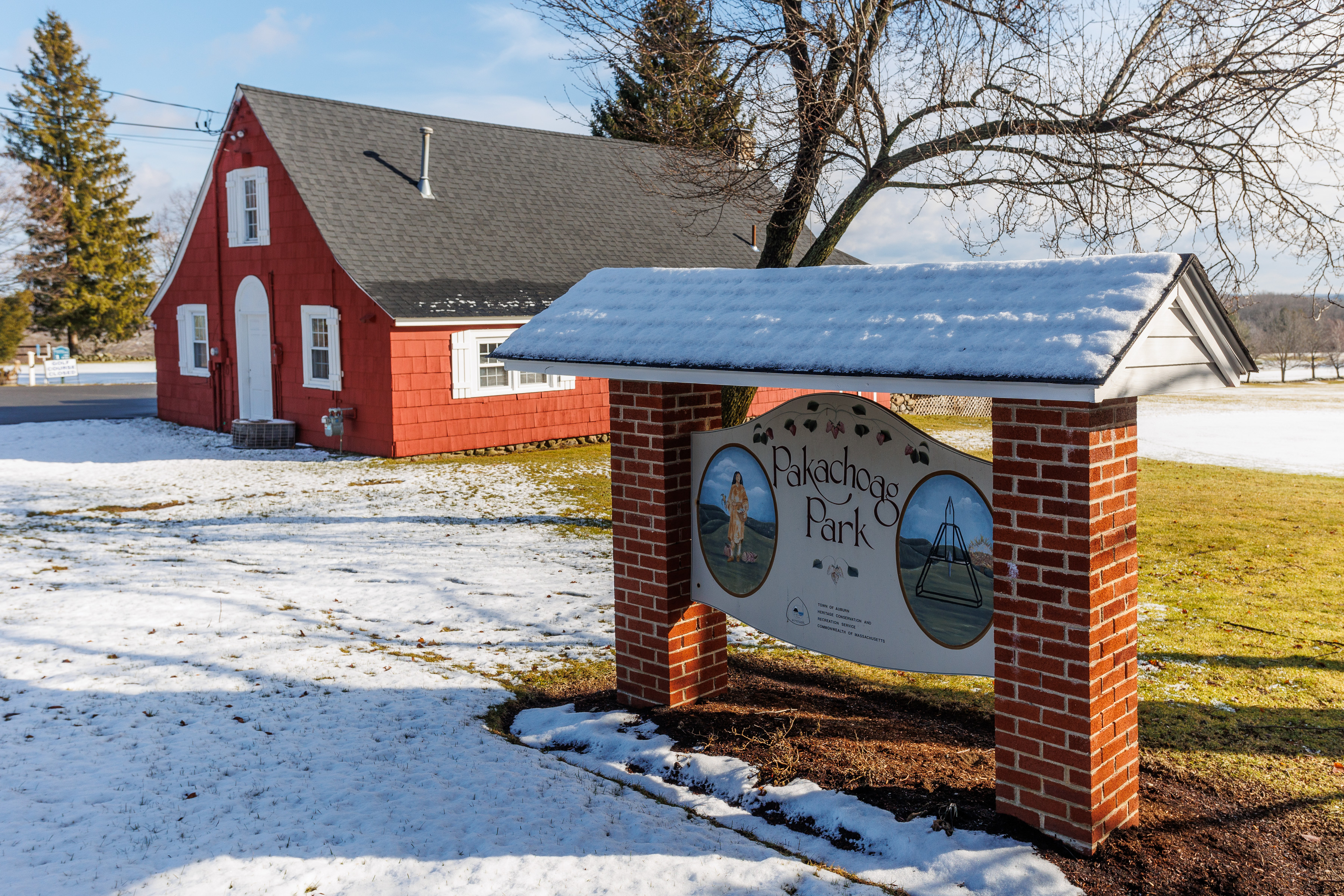
The launch site is located within Pakachoag Golf Course

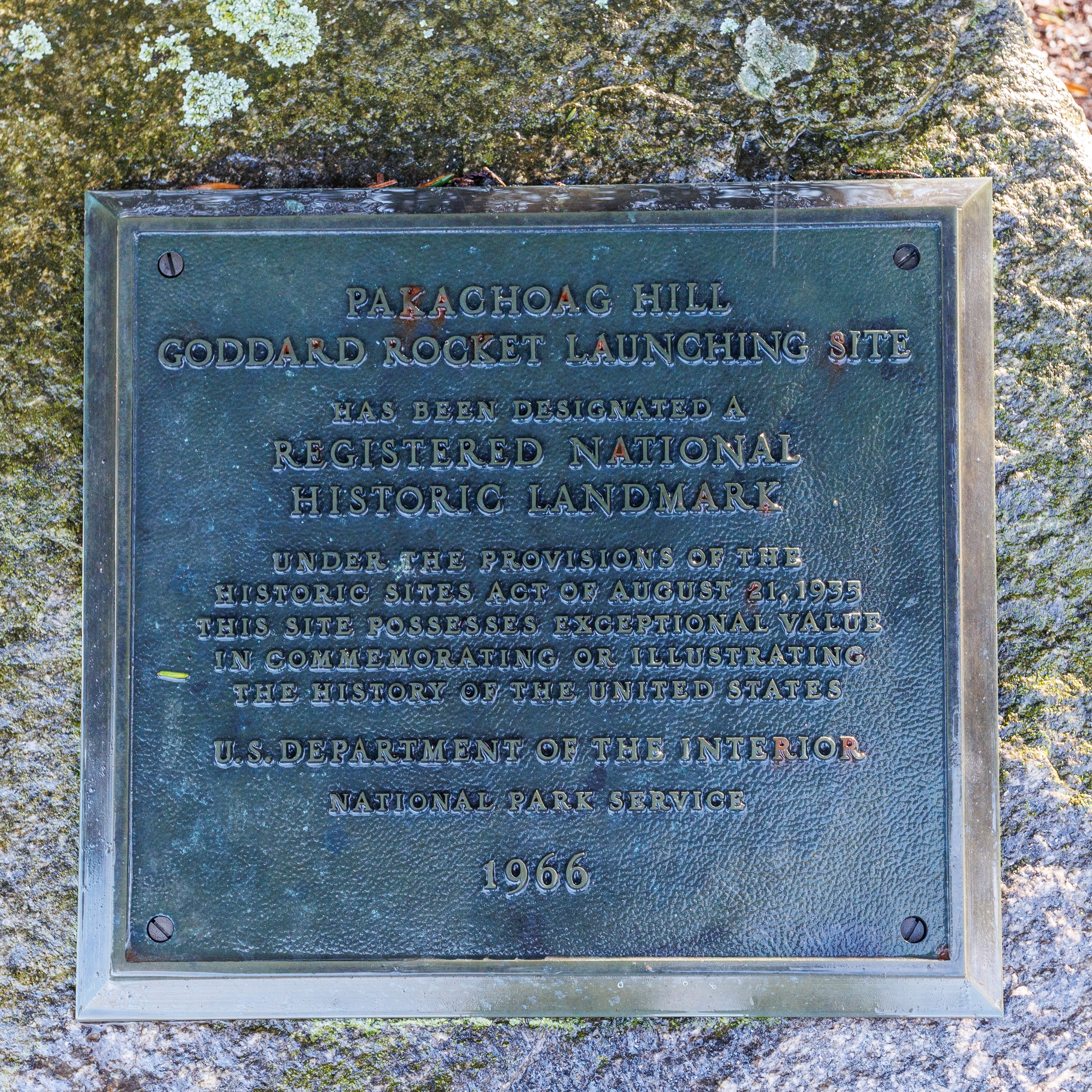
NRHP plaque was placed on Upland Street in 1966

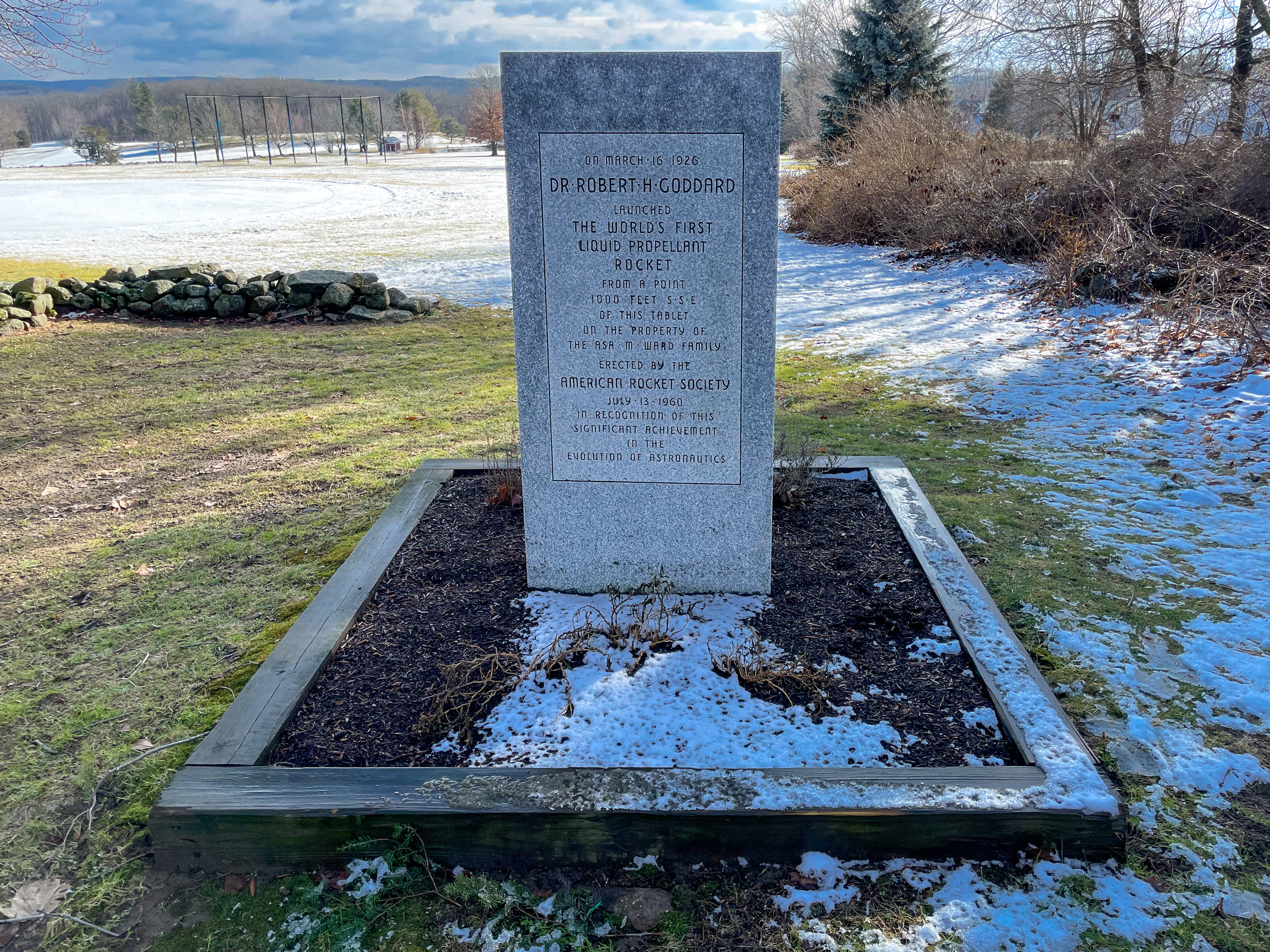
Stone marker was placed on Upland Street in 1960

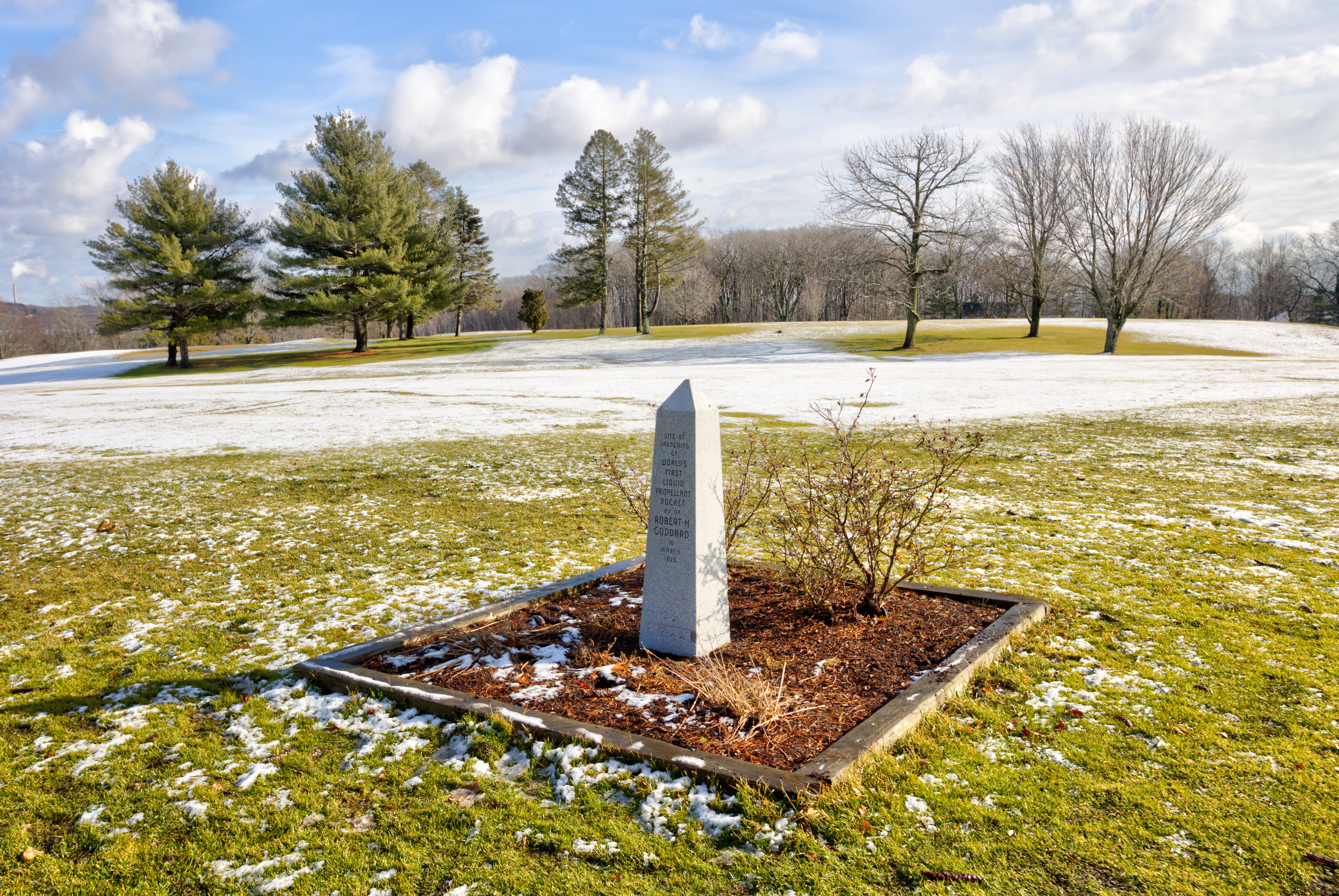
A small obelisk marking the exact launch site is inside the golf course

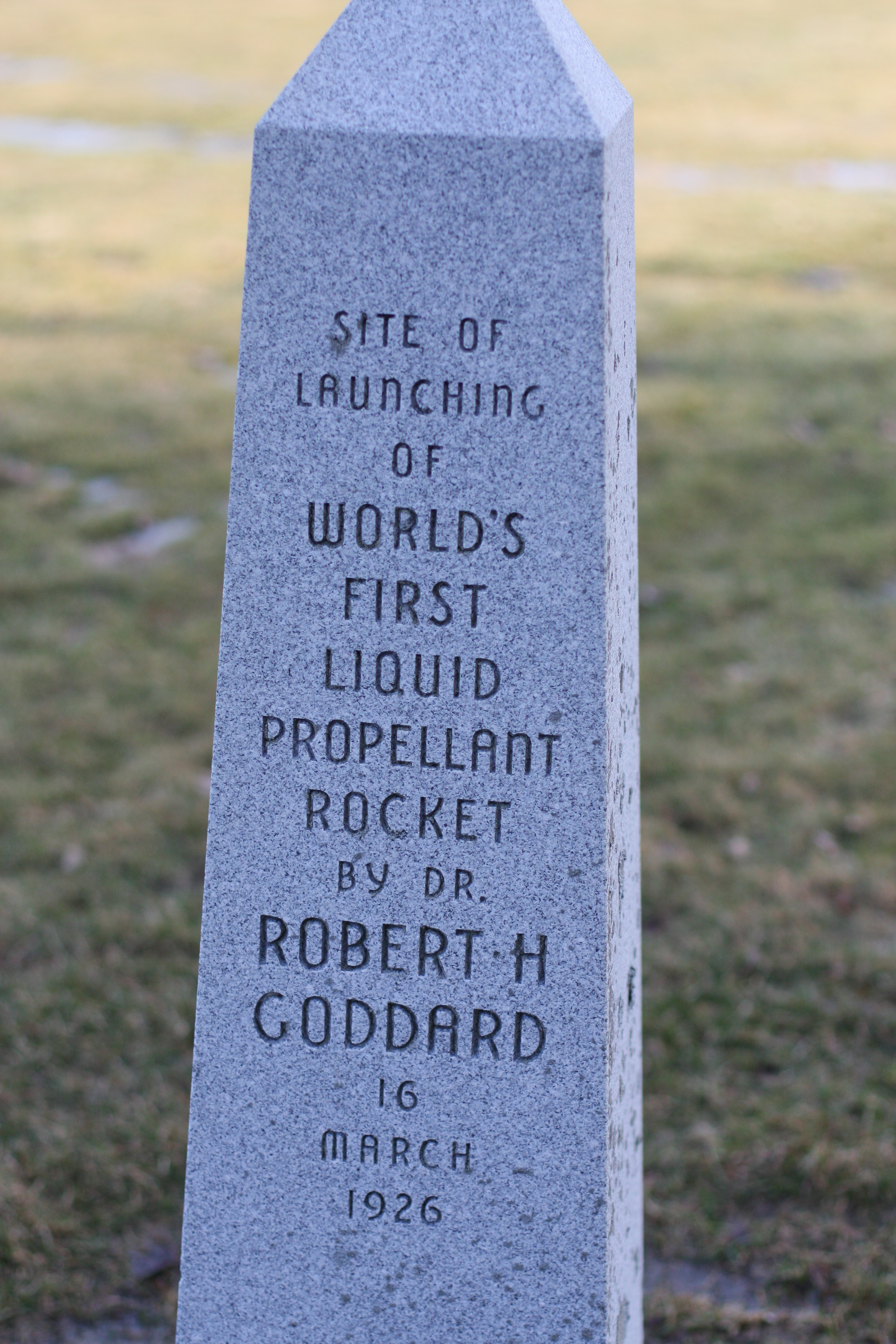
Detail of obelisk

== See also ==
- List of National Historic Landmarks in Massachusetts
- National Register of Historic Places listings in Worcester County, Massachusetts
