= United States Post Office–Millbury Main =

- US Post Office-Millbury Main
- U.S. National Register of Historic Places
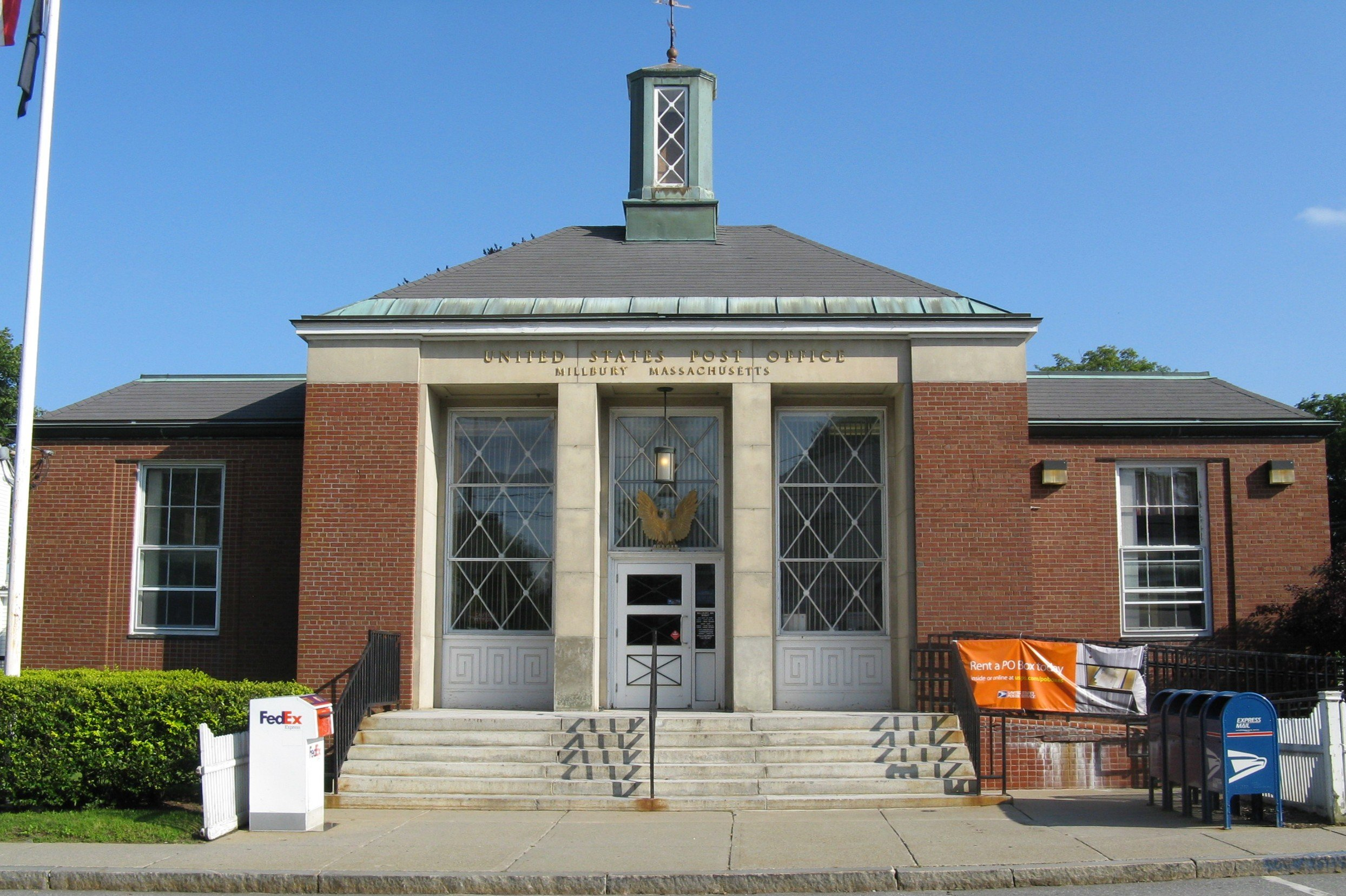
- Millbury Post Office

- Location within Massachusetts Location within the United States
- Location: Millbury, Massachusetts
- Coordinates: 42°11′26.2″N 71°45′42.7″W
- Built: 1940
- Architect: Simon, Louis A.; Cutler Construction Co.
- Architectural style: Moderne
- NRHP reference No.: 87001764
- Added to NRHP: October 15, 1987

The US Post Office-Millbury Main is an historic building on 119 Elm Street in Millbury, Massachusetts. The single-story brick building was built in 1941, and has styling with Art Deco features. It has a cupola with diamond-glass windows and a copper roof; the diamond window pattern also appears in the windows that flank and top the building's entrance. The interior retains much of its original woodwork and styling, and includes a mural painted by Joe Lasker depicting a battle between Native Americans and English colonists.

The post office was listed on the National Register of Historic Places in 1987.

== See also ==
- National Register of Historic Places listings in Worcester County, Massachusetts
- List of United States post offices
