= Zedekiah Belknap =

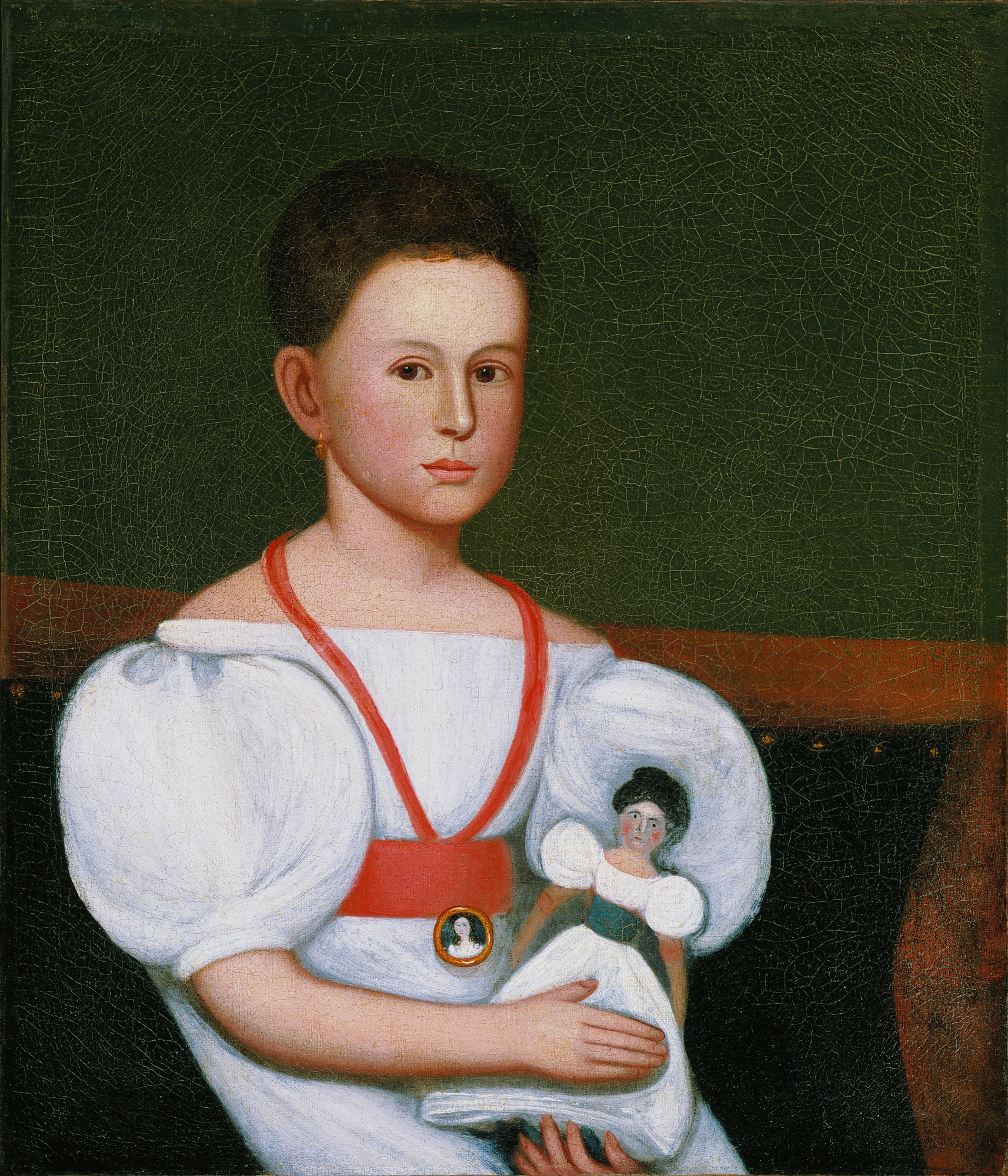
Seated Girl, 1835, oil on canvas, in the collection of the Detroit Institute of Arts

Zedekiah Belknap (1781–1858) was an itinerant American portraitist.

A native of Auburn, Massachusetts, then called Ward, Belknap moved with his family to Weathersfield, Vermont when he was thirteen years old. He studied divinity at Dartmouth College, and upon his graduation in 1807 embarked upon a career as a preacher, although he was never ordained; his earliest known portraits date to the same year. He married in 1812, but the marriage was brief; his preaching career, too, soon ended, although some sources claim that he was active as a preacher during the War of 1812. Turning to painting full time, he spent much of his remaining life traveling through Vermont, New Hampshire, and Massachusetts producing portraits upon commission, nearly two hundred of which survive. Stylistically they depict figures with light-colored faces, their features heavily outlined, and clothing set against dark backgrounds; rounded roses are a hallmark of his paintings. Belknap's last known portrait was painted in 1848. In 1857 he entered the Chester Poor Farm in Weathersfield, dying there the following year.

Portraits by Belknap may be found in the collections of the Smithsonian American Art Museum, the Detroit Institute of Arts, and the Currier Museum of Art.
