= Waters Building =

Waters Building may refer to:

- Waters Building (Birmingham, Alabama), listed on the National Register of Historic Places in Jefferson County, Alabama
- Waters Building (Grand Rapids, Michigan), listed on the National Register of Historic Places in Kent County, Michigan

== See also ==
- Waters House (disambiguation)
