= Asa Waters =

American politician

Asa Waters II (November 2, 1769, in Sutton – December 24, 1841, in Millbury) was an American gunsmith and industrialist.

He learned gunsmithing from his father, and earned a patent for turning a gun barrel in a lathe.

In 1808, with his brother Elijah, he founded an armory, which contracted with the government. In 1825 he founded Millbury Bank. In 1823, he was elected to the Massachusetts House of Representatives.

He married Susan Holman Waters, on May 19, 1802; they had eight children:

- Susan Holman (Waters) Torrey born 1803, died February 3, 1866, married Samuel Davenport Torrey (1789–1877), They had 5 children including Louisa Maria (Torrey) Taft (1827–1907) mother of President William Howard Taft;
- Sarafina;
- Asa Holman Waters, born February 8, 1808, died January 17, 1887, married Mary Elizabeth (Hovey) Waters (1829–1892), maternal grandfather of Gilbert Hovey Grosvenor, editor of National Geographic Magazine, This Asa H. Waters wrote: Biographical Sketch of Thomas Blanchard and his inventions, Printed by L.P. Goddard in 1878 in Worcester, Mass.;
- Fanny Jane;
- Anna Jane;
- Harriet Newell (Waters) Dutton born August 18, 1814, died July 3, 1864, m Samuel William Southmayd Dutton (1814–1866);
- Adelia Augusta (Waters) Tarbox born January 18, 1820, died October 7, 1883, married Increase Niles Tarbox (1815–1888), 2 children;
- Caroline S. (Waters) Forbush born January 17, 1826, died August 7, 1886, married Jonathan Forbush (1802–1882), 2 children.

He built the Asa Waters Mansion from 1824 to 1829.
