= Millbury High School =

Millbury Memorial Junior/Senior High School
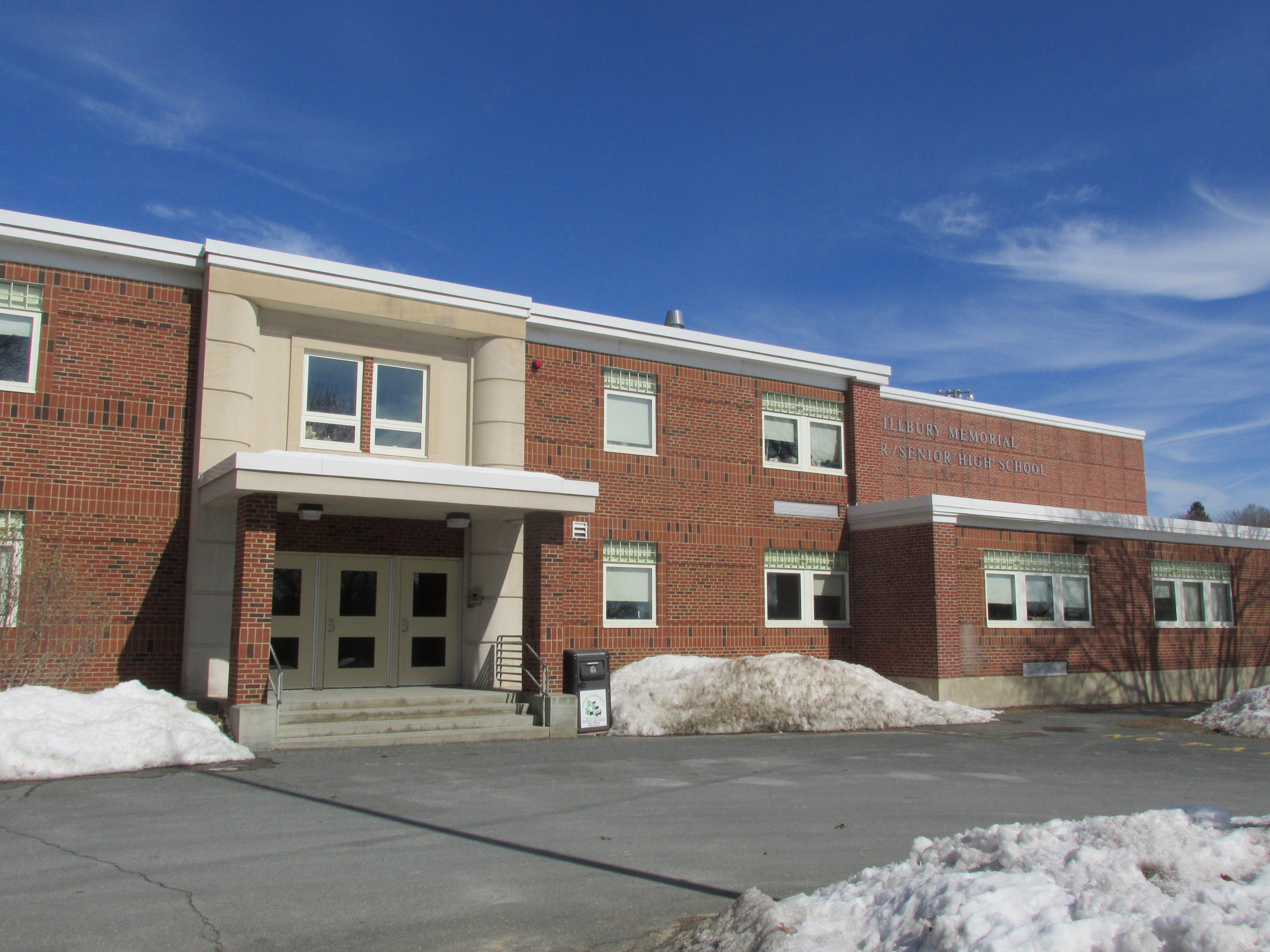
- View of Millbury High in 2014

Location
- 12 Martin Street; Millbury, Massachusetts 01527; United States; 42°12′40.42″N 71°46′05.48″W

Information
- School type: Public
- Established: 1851
- School district: Millbury Public Schools
- Superintendent: Gregory Myers
- CEEB code: 221420
- Principal: Christopher Lowe
- Teaching staff: 63.35 (FTE)
- Grades: 7-12
- Enrollment: 722 (2024-2025)
  - Grade 7: 132
  - Grade 8: 105
  - Grade 9: 119
  - Grade 10: 132
  - Grade 11: 111
  - Grade 12: 118
  - SP: 5
- Student to teacher ratio: 11.38
- Colors: Maroon, gold, and white
- Slogan: Woolie Pride
- Athletics: MIAA
- Athletics conference: Central Massachusetts Athletic Conference
- Mascot: Woolie
- Team name: Woolies
- Rival: Grafton High School
- Accreditation: NEASC
- USNWR ranking: 253 (MA), 8,820 (US) (2025-2026)
- Newspaper: Reflector
- Website: hs.millburyschools.org

Millbury Memorial Junior/Senior High School is a public school in Millbury, Massachusetts, United States. It serves students in grades seven through twelve. The school was founded in 1851.

== History ==
Millbury Memorial Junior/Senior High School was founded in 1851 on the site of Millbury Academy. Millbury High was originally located on 130 Elm Street, which is now occupied by the Mary Elizabeth McGrath Educational Center. In 1913, renovations took place.

In 1952, Millbury High moved to its current location at 12 Martin Street, housing grades nine through twelve, and later included grades seven and eight. The school was then also dedicated as a memorial to local World War II veterans.

In 1988, Millbury High added a new gymnasium and science wing as part of a town-approved $2.1 million expansion to address growing enrollment and aging facilities.

In 2003, the Millbury High building was renovated and expanded. During that time, grade seven temporarily moved to Raymond E. Shaw Elementary School, while grades eight through twelve remained in place. After renovations finished, grades seven and eight were given their own wing of the school, separate from the rest of the grades.

In 2024, the school received a $75,000 Skills Capital Grant to enhance its vocational and technical education programs, aiming to better prepare students for high-demand industries.

== Athletics ==
Home of the Woolies, Millbury athletic teams primarily sport the colors of maroon, gold, and white. Current sport offerings at the school include basketball, cheerleading, cross country, football, golf, soccer, baseball, softball, track and field, tennis, esports, and volleyball.

Millbury High is a member of the Central Massachusetts Athletic Conference (CMAC).

Michael Favulli coached sports at Millbury High.

In 1996, Erin Dromgoole of Millbury High was the female recipient of the Wendy's High School Heisman for that year.

In 2025, Millbury High won the MIAA Division 4 Baseball State Championship, winning their first baseball state title since 1984.

=== Sports by season ===
Fall	Winter	Spring
Cross Country	Basketball	Outdoor Track & Field
Soccer	Indoor Track & Field	Tennis
Unified Basketball	Cheerleading (girls)	Esports
Esports	Wrestling (co-op with Northbridge High School)	Unified Track & Field
Golf (boys)	Wrestling (co-op with Northbridge High School)	Baseball (boys)
Volleyball (girls)	Wrestling (co-op with Northbridge High School)	Softball (girls)
Football (boys)

== Athletic state championships ==
Millbury has a total of 7 state championships across 3 sports. The girls' soccer team has seen the most success in terms of state championships, with a total of 3. The most recent state championship was in 2025, when the baseball team won the first state title for the school since the 2019 Girls' soccer championship. In recent years, Millbury's baseball, boys' basketball, volleyball, esports, and football teams have seen the most success, with many teams qualifying for the MIAA final four, and the esports team reaching the MSAA state finals in 2024 and 2025.

Note: From 1972 to 2012, football state championships were separated by region, so there would be multiple champions from each division. From 1972 to 1977 and from 1997 to 2008, it was split between Eastern Mass and Central/Western Mass and there would be two champions in each division. From 1978 to 1996 and from 2009 to 2012 Central and Western Mass split so there would be three champions in each division. In 2013 everything was combined and therefore only allowed one state champion per division.

Sport	Year(s)
MIAA sanctioned sports
Girls' soccer (3)	2015, 2016, 2019
Baseball (2)	1984, 2025
Football (2)	1993, 2003
Other sports
Boys' track (middle school) (1)	2017
Esports (1)	2026

== Demographics ==
According to the Massachusetts Department of Education, the approximate demographic profile of Millbury Junior/Senior High School is as follows in the 2024-2025 school year:

- White - 73%
- Hispanic - 12.2%
- Multi-Race - 6.1%
- Black - 4.7%
- Asian - 3.9%
- Native Hawaiian or Other Pacific Islander - 0.1%

== Notable alumni ==
- Michael O. Moore, member of the Massachusetts Senate
- Albert L. Nash, member of the Massachusetts House of Representatives
- Ryan Ward, outfielder, Los Angeles Dodgers

== See also ==
- List of high schools in Massachusetts
