= First Presbyterian Society Meeting House =

- U.S. National Register of Historic Places
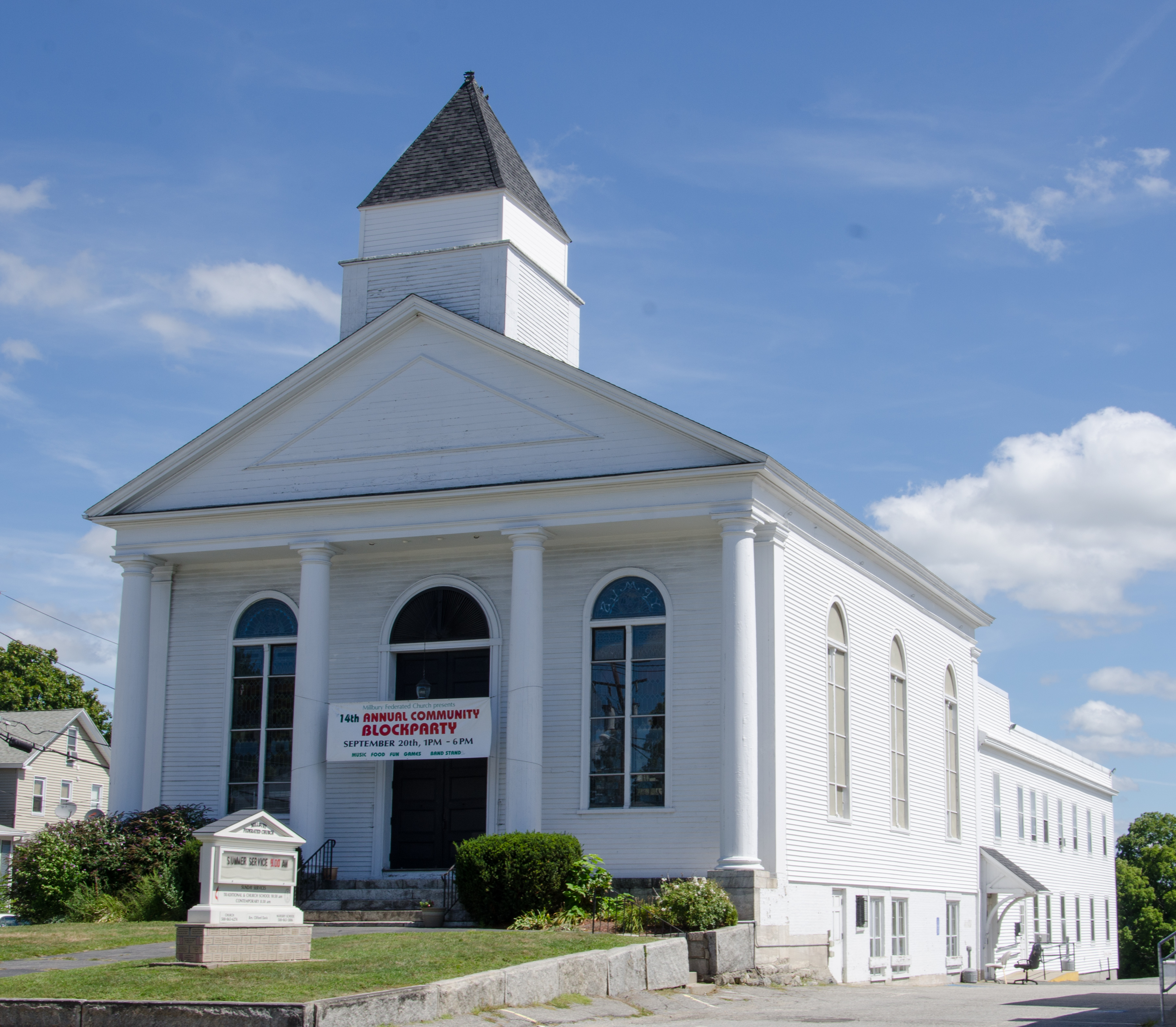

- Location within Massachusetts Location within the United States
- Nearest city: 20 Main Street, Millbury, Massachusetts
- Coordinates: 42°11′32″N 71°45′37″W
- Built: 1828
- Architect: Elias Carter
- Architectural style: Greek Revival
- NRHP reference No.: 10000722
- Added to NRHP: September 9, 2010

The First Presbyterian Society Meeting House (now the Millbury Federated Church) is an historic meeting house at 20 Main Street in Millbury, Massachusetts. The 1 1/2-story Greek Revival church was designed by Elias Carter and built in 1828 for a Presbyterian congregation that had been established the previous year. The main facade has a full-height portico with four columns supporting a triangular pediment. It is three bays wide, with long narrow round-arch windows in the side bays, and the main entrance in the center, topped by a half-round fanlight. The interior has retained much of its original woodwork, despite renovations in 1862 in which the main hall was reoriented from west to east.

The building was listed on the National Register of Historic Places in 2010.

== See also ==
- National Register of Historic Places listings in Worcester County, Massachusetts
