= Lewis Buckner =

American house builder

- Born: March 12, 1856; Strawberry Plains, Tennessee, U.S.
- Died: May 16, 1924 (aged 68)
- Occupation: Carpenter

Lewis Buckner (March 12, 1856–May 16, 1924) was an American house builder, carpenter and furniture maker. (His name has also been spelled "Louis Buckner".) Born and raised a slave as a child, Buckner was freed in 1865 and later apprenticed to a furniture maker. He became one of several successful African-American construction entrepreneurs in late-19th century Sevier County, Tennessee. At least fifteen homes that were either built by Buckner or are believed to have been built by Buckner are still standing, two of which are listed on the U.S. National Register of Historic Places.

He also designed and built furniture in the late 19th century, and an elaborate bed and dresser were acquired in 2015 by the Tennessee State Museum for its collection.

== Biography ==
Buckner was born into slavery in Strawberry Plains, Tennessee in 1856. His mother was an African-American slave and his father is believed to have been white. He and his mother were freed in 1865 after the American Civil War. In the 1870s, Buckner learned the trade of furniture-making as an apprentice to a white Sevierville furniture-maker named Christian Stump.

Buckner married Jane Bryant in 1875. By 1880 he had established his own cabinet-making business. In 2015, the Tennessee State Museum announced it has acquired an elaborate bed and dresser made by Buckner about 1889.

With his skills, Buckner could handle larger carpentry and construction projects. He built his first house— the Darius and Mary Robertson House— around 1880. Buckner's subsequent houses included the Wayland-Patterson House (1886) near the Fair Garden community, the Riley H. Andes House (ca. 1890) in Sevierville, the Trotter-Waters House (1895) in downtown Sevierville, the Sam Dixon House (1914) near the Shady Grove Community, and the Mullendore House (1921) near Pigeon Forge.

He built his own house in the Mullican Grove community in 1894. In 1886, Buckner teamed up with African-American bricklayer Isaac Dockery (1832-1910) to help build the New Salem Baptist Church in Sevierville. Dockery built up the brick walls and Buckner created the interior design.

== Buckner's techniques ==
Like other carpenters and builders, Buckner drew from circulated pattern books for his work, but he modified such basic patterns to create his own unique renditions. Buckner's houses were typically 2-story Italianate or Queen Anne "I-frame" designs. Buckner often carved and built much of the houses' exterior detailing— which included bargeboards, porches, and scrollwork— as well as the houses' interior elements, including mantels, cabinets, and newell posts.

== Structures built by Buckner ==
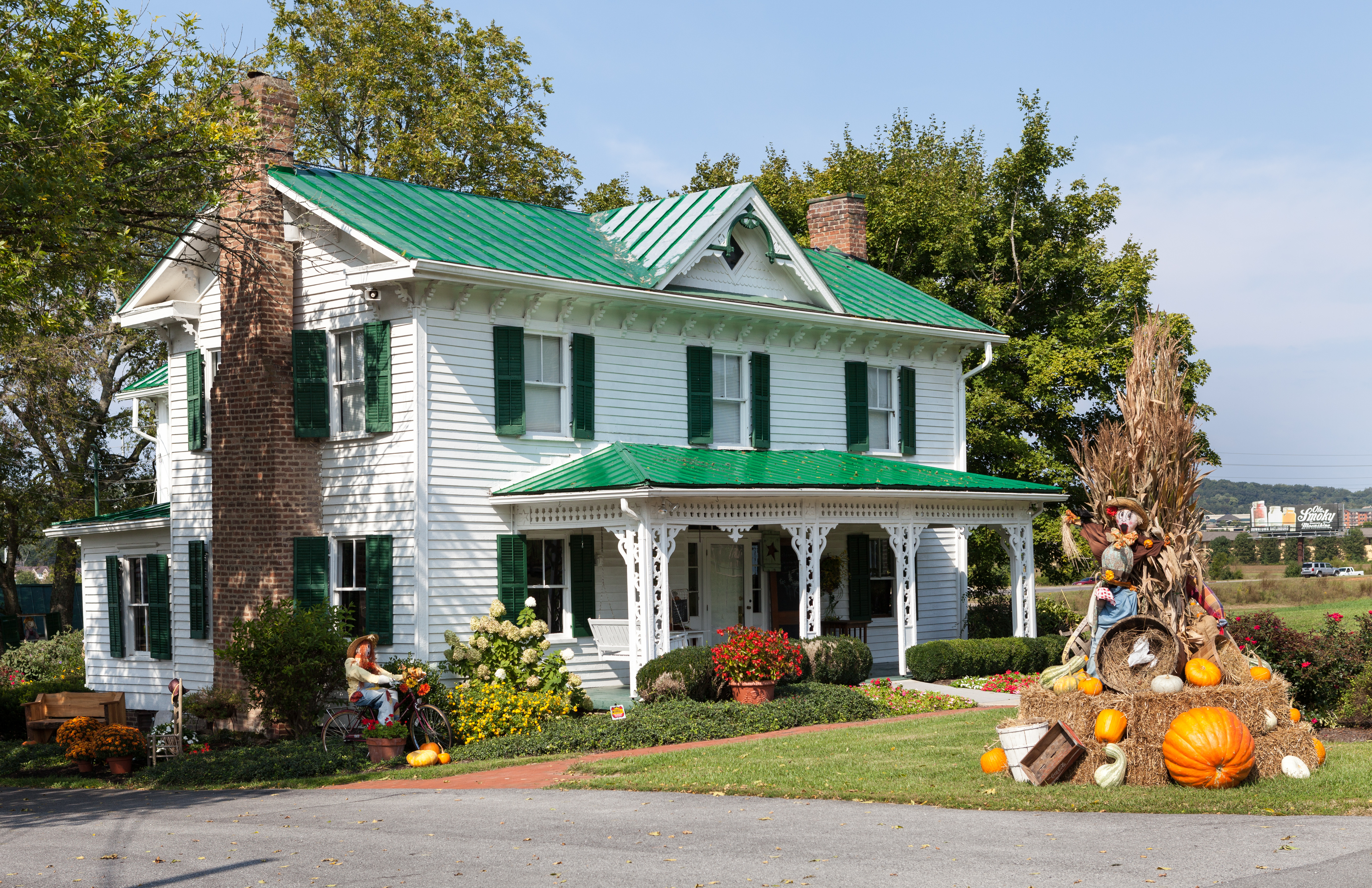
The Riley H. Andes House, built by Lewis Buckner.

At least fifteen houses currently standing in Sevier County are believed to have been built by Buckner. Some have not been verified by any source other than oral tradition or the fact that certain designs strongly resemble Buckner's known works. Two that could be documented as his have been listed on the National Register of Historic Places.

Houses built or renovated by Buckner include:

- Riley H. Andes House, on Douglas Dam Road in Sevierville, Tennessee, built around 1890; added to the National Register of Historic Places in 1980.
- Sam Dixon House, built in 1914 near the Shady Grove community.
- William Cal Jones House, built circa 1886 in the Fair Garden community, usually attributed to Buckner.
- Lafollette-Patterson House, a two-story house in the Fair Garden community east of Sevierville.
- Mullendore House, built in 1921 near Pigeon Forge.
- Darius and Mary Robertson House, a 2-story I-frame house built circa 1880 in the Harrisburg community outside of Sevierville. Buckner did most of the house's original interior design work.
- Trotter-Waters House, at 217 Cedar Street in downtown Sevierville, built in the Queen Anne style in c.1895; added to the National Register of Historic Places in 1975.
