= Worcester Flood Diversion Channel =

The Worcester Flood Diversion Channel is a flood control channel located in Auburn and Millbury, Massachusetts. It was built by the United States Army Corps of Engineers because of the Flood Control Act of 1944. Its aim was to protect the city of Worcester, Massachusetts from future floods, as previous flooding had caused much damage to the city. It consists of a series of dams, reservoirs, and channels. During the winter, part of the channel becomes the Auburn Ice Channel, which has become a local destination for ice climbing.
