= Dial Award =

The Dial Award was presented annually by the Dial Corporation to the male and female American high-school athlete/scholar of the year.

== Awardees ==
Year	Male	Female
1979	Herschel Walker, football	No award given
1980	Bill Fralic, football	Carol Lewis, track and field
1981	Kevin Willhite, football	Cheryl Miller, basketball
1982	Mike Smith, basketball	Elaine Zayak, skating
1983	Chris Spielman, football	Melanie Buddemeyer, swimming
1984	Hart Lee Dykes, football	Nora Lewis, basketball
1985	Jeff George, football	Gea Johnson, track and field
1986	Scott Schaffner, football	Mya Johnson, track and field
1987	Todd Marinovich, football	Kristi Overton, water skiing
1988	Carlton Gray, football	Courtney Cox, basketball
1989	Robert Smith, football	Lisa Leslie, basketball
1990	Derrick Brooks, football	Vicki Goetze, golf
1991	Jeff Buckey, football, track and field	Katie Smith, basketball, volleyball, track
1992	Jacque Vaughn, basketball	Amanda White, track and field, swimming
1993	Tiger Woods, golf	Kristin Folkl, basketball
1994	Taymon Domzalski, basketball	Shannon Miller, gymnastics
1995	Brent Abernathy, baseball	Shea Ralph, basketball
1996	Grant Irons, football	Grace Park, golf
1997	Ronald Curry, football	Michelle Kwan, figure skating

== See also ==
- Wendy's High School Heisman
