= Auburn, Massachusetts =

- Town
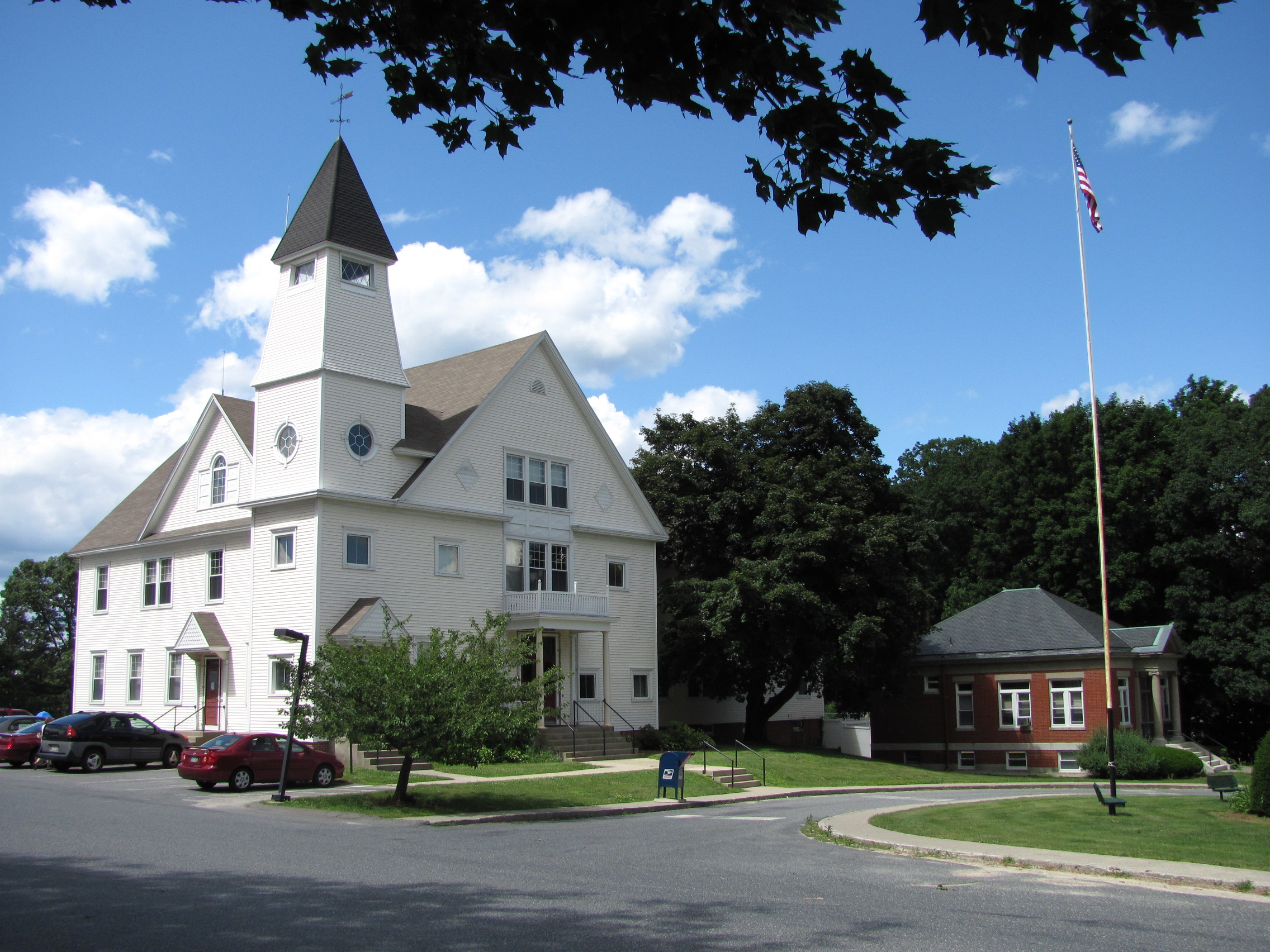
- Auburn Town Offices and Merriam Library

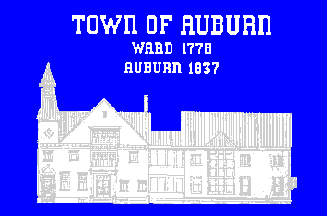
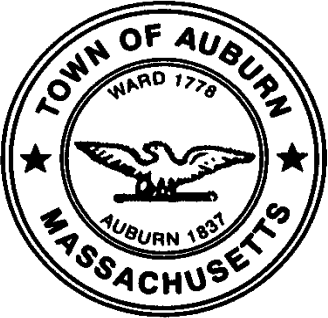
- Flag Seal

- Location in Worcester County and the state of Massachusetts.
- Coordinates: 42°12′N 71°50′W
- Country: United States
- State: Massachusetts
- County: Worcester
- Settled: 1714
- Incorporated: April 10, 1778

Government
  - Type: Representative town meeting
  - Town Manager: Edward Kazanovicz
  - Board of Selectmen: Chair Scott Wrenn; Vice-Chair Sara Rufli; Dan Carpenter; Lionel Berthiaume
  - School Committee: Chair Jessica Harrington; Vice-Chair Meghan McCrillis; Gail Halloway; Samantha Raphael; Brooke Wrenn

Area
  - Total: 16.4 sq mi (42.5 km^{2})
  - Land: 15.4 sq mi (39.8 km^{2})
  - Water: 1.0 sq mi (2.7 km^{2})
- Elevation: 604 ft (184 m)

Population (2020)
  - Total: 16,889
  - Density: 1,100/sq mi (424/km^{2})
- Time zone: UTC-5 (Eastern)
  - Summer (DST): UTC-4 (Eastern)
- ZIP code: 01501
- Area code: 508 / 774
- FIPS code: 25-02760
- GNIS feature ID: 0619474
- Website: www.auburnma.gov

Auburn is a town in Worcester County, Massachusetts, United States. The population was 16,889 at the 2020 census.

== History ==
The Auburn area was first settled in 1714. On April 10, 1778, parts of Worcester, Sutton, Leicester and Oxford, Massachusetts were incorporated as the Town of Ward, in honor of American Revolution General Artemas Ward (second in command to George Washington). In 1837, the town changed its name to Auburn after the Post Office complained that the name was too similar to the nearby town of Ware.

Before incorporation, most of Auburn was known as the South Parish of Worcester; other portions fell within the town limits of Leicester and Millbury.

Robert H. Goddard launched the first liquid-fueled rocket from Pakachoag Hill, on his aunt Effe Ward's farm, in Auburn on March 16, 1926. Goddard is commemorated in Goddard Memorial Park, located downtown next to the Auburn Fire Department Headquarters. The park features a model of Goddard's prototype liquid-fueled rocket and a Polaris missile (Type A-1). A second replica of Goddard's prototype stands at Auburn High School. Goddard's launch is also commemorated with a small monument, the Goddard Rocket Launching Site, between the first and ninth holes of Pakachoag Golf Course.

== Demographics ==
Historical population
Year	Pop.	±%
1790	473	—
1850	879	+85.8%
1860	914	+4.0%
1870	1,178	+28.9%
1880	1,317	+11.8%
1890	1,532	+16.3%
1900	2,446	+59.7%
1910	2,797	+14.3%
1920	3,052	+9.1%
1930	6,147	+101.4%
1940	6,629	+7.8%
1950	8,840	+33.4%
1960	14,047	+58.9%
1970	15,347	+9.3%
1980	14,845	−3.3%
1990	15,005	+1.1%
2000	15,901	+6.0%
2010	16,188	+1.8%
2020	16,889	+4.3%
2025*	17,566	+4.0%
* = population estimate. Source: United States census records and Population Estimates Program data.

The 2010 Auburn, MA, population was 16,188. There are 1,053 people per square mile.

The median age is 40.8. The US median is 37.6. 61.86% of people in Auburn, MA, are married. 8.00% are divorced. The average household size is 2.41 people. 22.71% of people are married, with children. 5.08% have children, but are single.

According to the 2000 census, 97.21% of people are white, 0.81% are black or African American, 1.19% are Asian, 0.10% are Native American, and 1.00% are "other". 1.24% of the people in Auburn, MA, are of Hispanic ethnicity.

== Arts and culture ==
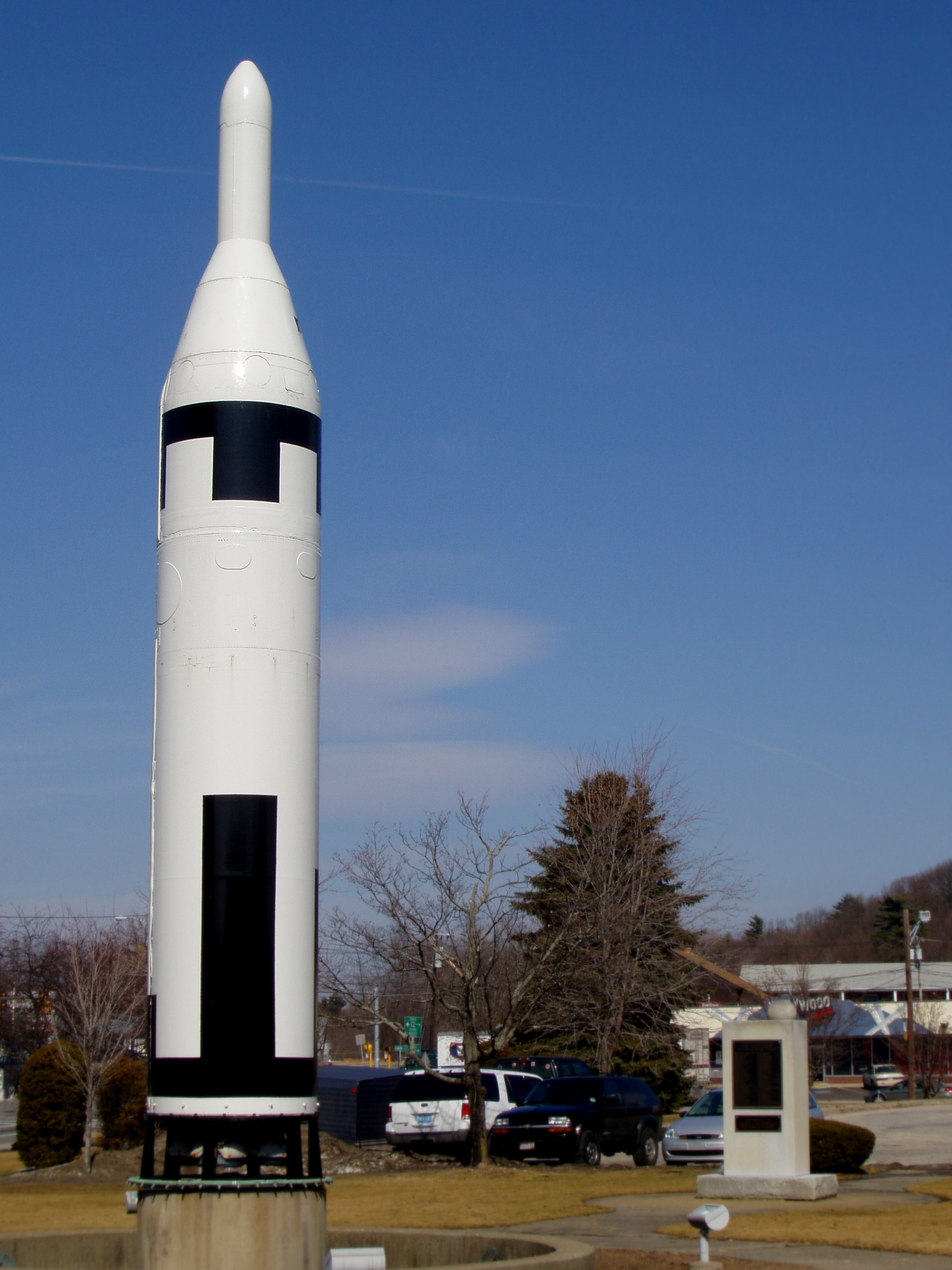
Dr. Robert H. Goddard Park

Points of interest include:

- Auburn Mall
- Goddard Rocket Launching Site
- Worcester Flood Diversion Channel

== Government ==
The form of government is representative town meeting. There are 24 town-meeting members from each of the five precincts of the town, for a total of 120 who represent the people at the annual town meeting each May. The town also has a Board of Selectmen which consists of five elected members, each serving for a term of three years. As of 2009, the town adopted a new charter which allowed for the creation of a Town Manager.

State government
State Representative(s):	Paul K. Frost (R)
State Senator(s):	Michael O. Moore (D)
Governor's Councilor(s):	Paul DePaulo (D)
Federal government
U.S. Representative(s):	2nd District
U.S. Senators:	Elizabeth Warren (D), Ed Markey (D)

== Education ==
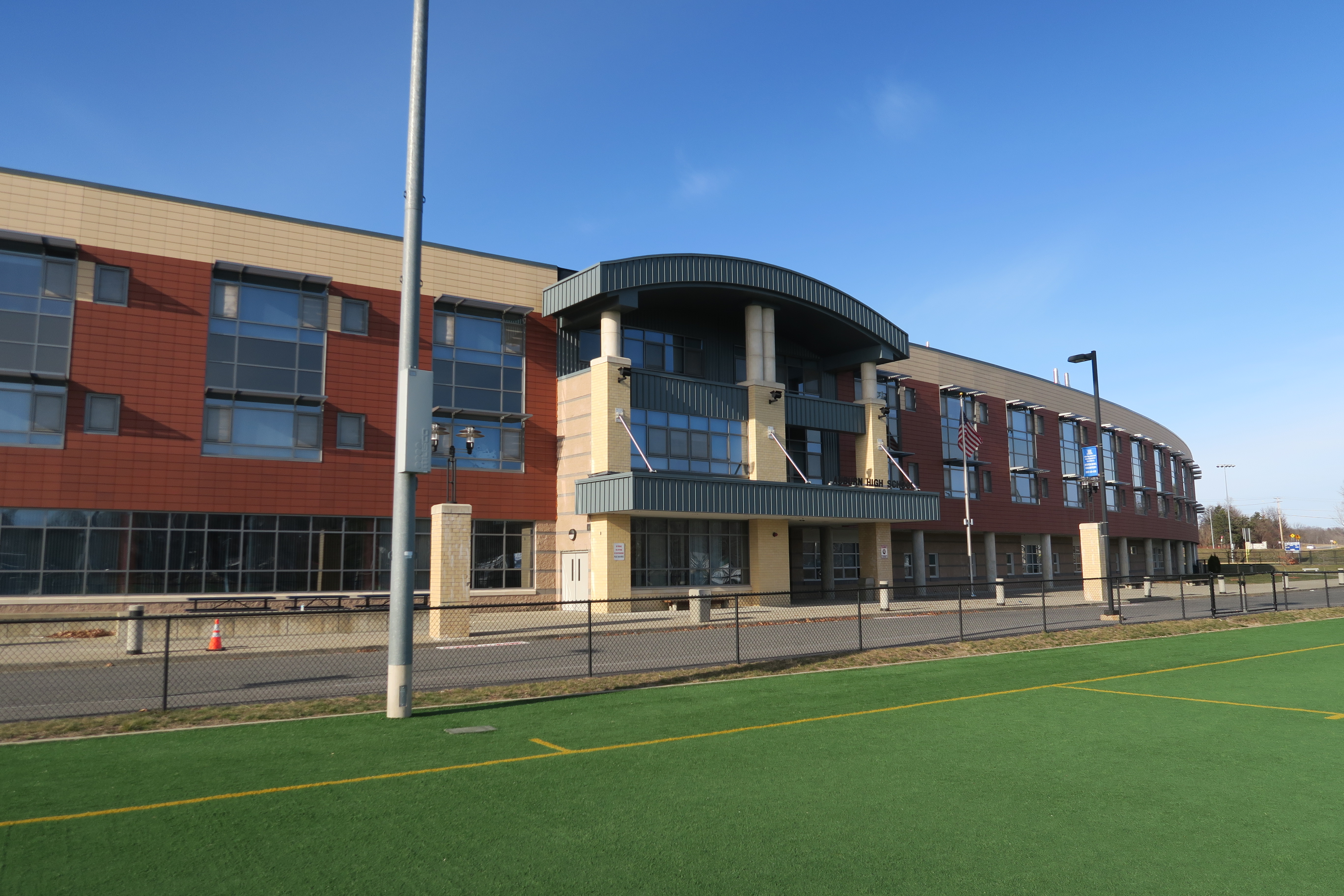
Auburn High School

Schools in Auburn include:

- Bryn Mawr School (grades K–2)
- Pakachoag School (grades K–2)
- Swanson Road Intermediate School (grades 3–5)
- Auburn Middle School (grades 6–8)
- Auburn High School (grades 9–12)

== Infrastructure ==
=== Highways ===
- I-90
- I-290
- I-395
- Route 12
- US 20

== Notable people ==
- Paul Allaire (1938–2019), CEO of Xerox Corp. from 1990 to 2001
- Jacob Whitman Bailey (1811–1857), biologist, educator
- Tyler Beede (born 1993), baseball pitcher for the Pittsburgh Pirates
- Zedekiah Belknap, portraitist
- Elias Carter, architect
- John Curdo (1931–2022), chess master, winner of numerous titles, including the US Senior Championship, who lived here in later life
- Jon F. Danilowicz, diplomat
- Paul Frost, state legislator
- Guy Glodis, politician
- Robert Goddard (1881–1945), rocket scientist
- Patrick Allen Joslyn (born 1986), drag performer known onstage as Joslyn Fox
- Kevin Keyser-Ziegler (born 1977), Walt Disney Entertainment Talent Casting Director
- John Krikorian, basketball coach
- Dick Lamby, professional ice hockey defenseman
- Jeffrey Lynn (1909–1995), stage-screen actor and film producer
- Barbara Marois, field hockey player
- Javier Mojica, professional basketball player
- Pat Murphy, professional catcher
- David Naleski (1952–2026), United States Navy veteran and trade union shop steward
- Elizabeth Noyce, philanthropist
- Margaret Colby Getchell Parsons, journalist
- Gina Marie Rzucidlo, mountaineer
- Henry Waterman Warren, teacher and plantation owner
