= Waters House (Sevierville, Tennessee) =

- U.S. National Register of Historic Places
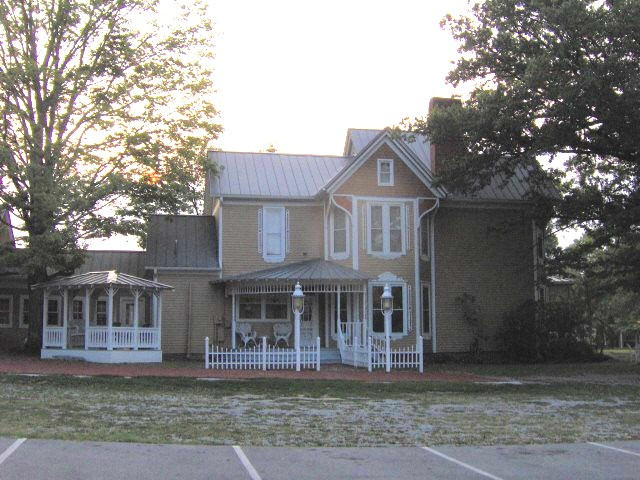

- Location within Tennessee
- Location: 217 Cedar St., Sevierville, Tennessee
- Coordinates: 35°51′56″N 83°33′46″W
- Area: 2 acres (0.81 ha)
- Built: c.1895
- Built by: Louis Buckner
- Architectural style: Victorian
- NRHP reference No.: 75001784
- Added to NRHP: June 18, 1975

The Waters House, at 217 Cedar St. in Sevierville, Tennessee, was built around 1895. It was listed on the National Register of Historic Places in 1975.

It was originally the house of Dr. A.W. Trotter, a dentist. Its NRHP nomination describes:

The home is a three story clapboard structure which is highlighted by the decor of craftsman, Louis Buckner, a nineteenth century black carpenter of exceptional skill. Gables abound on the home at various levels; three are formed on each side of the house to terminate the bay windows at the roof. "Butterfly wings" drape the sides of the bay windows at the second floor; the wings are the work of Buckner. The porch is trimmed with "Dumbbell" dowels and gingerbread trim; it is rounded at the corner toward the rear of the home. The yard is nicely landscaped and outlined by an iron fence in front.

The interior brings the home alive. The woodwork of Buckner is found in almost every room. The local carpenter had a unique style which included simple geometric designs and carvings of floral patterns. The majority of his work was done in oak and other hardwoods. In the parlor is an elaborately carved aantel, the most attractive piece of his work in the house. The mantel is about eight feet high of carved oak. Buckner placed a tilting beveled mirror above the fireplace which is outlined in tile and covered by a brass grate. Another mantel of lesser proportion but similar pattern is found in the sitting room. Various pieces of Buckner's furniture are also to be found in the home.
