= Asa Waters Mansion =

Historic house in Massachusetts, United States

- U.S. National Register of Historic Places
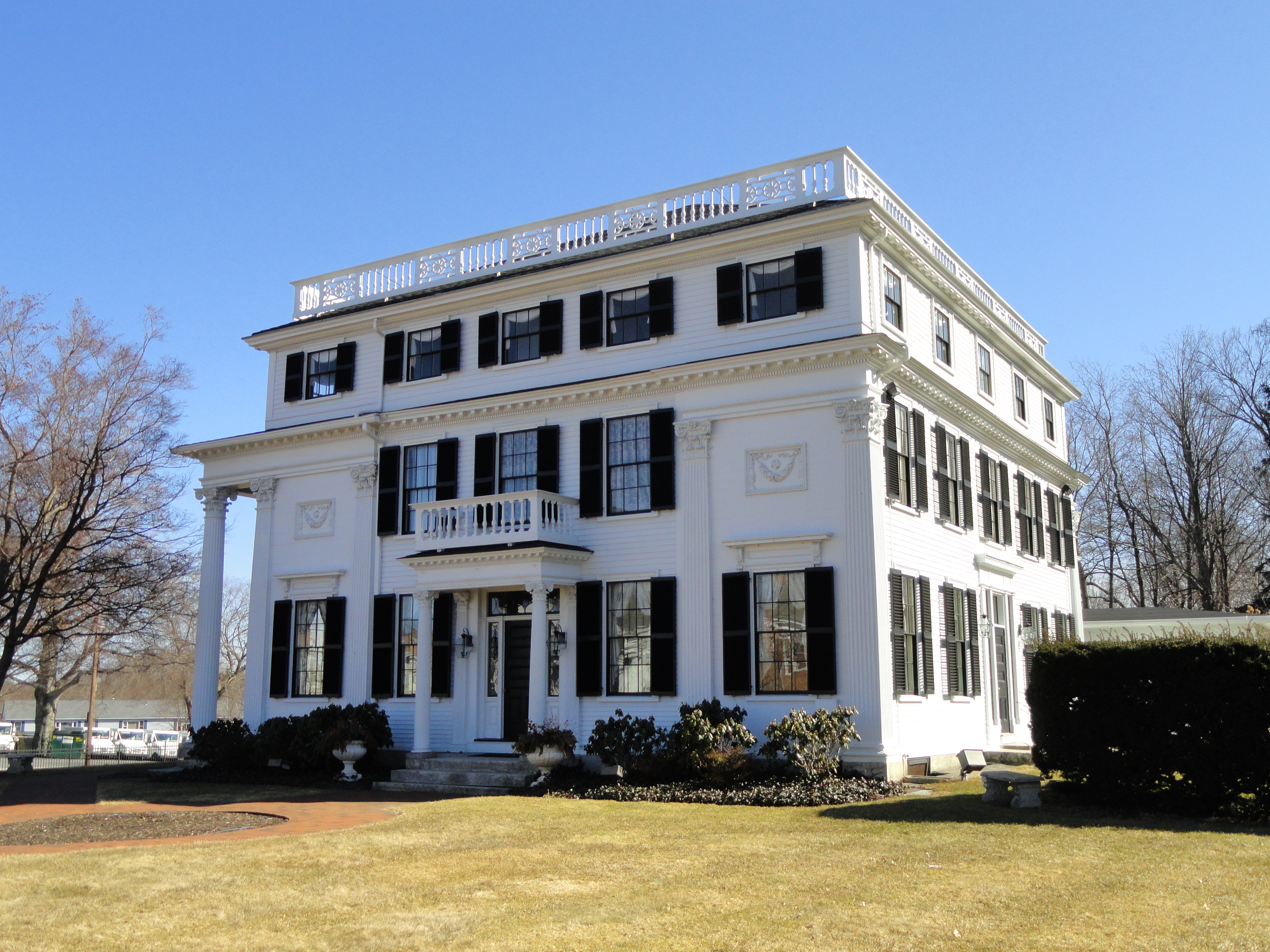

- Location within Massachusetts Location within the United States
- Location: 123 Elm St., Millbury, Massachusetts
- Coordinates: 42°11′24.6″N 71°45′44.4″W
- Built: 1826–1832; 194 years ago
- Architect: Asher Benjamin
- Architectural style: Federal
- NRHP reference No.: 78000479
- Added to NRHP: February 14, 1978

The Asa Waters Mansion is an historic mansion at 123 Elm Street in Millbury, Massachusetts. Designed by architect Asher Benjamin for Asa Waters and Susan Holman Waters, the mansion was built between 1826 and 1832, It is a three-story wood-frame house, with a hip roof ringed by a low balustrade. Its front facade is distinguished by colonnade of fluted two-story pillars with composite capitals, with pilasters at the building corners. The Millbury Historical Society is headquartered there, and the Mansion is used as an event space for public and private organizations and individuals.

The building was listed on the National Register of Historic Places in 1978.

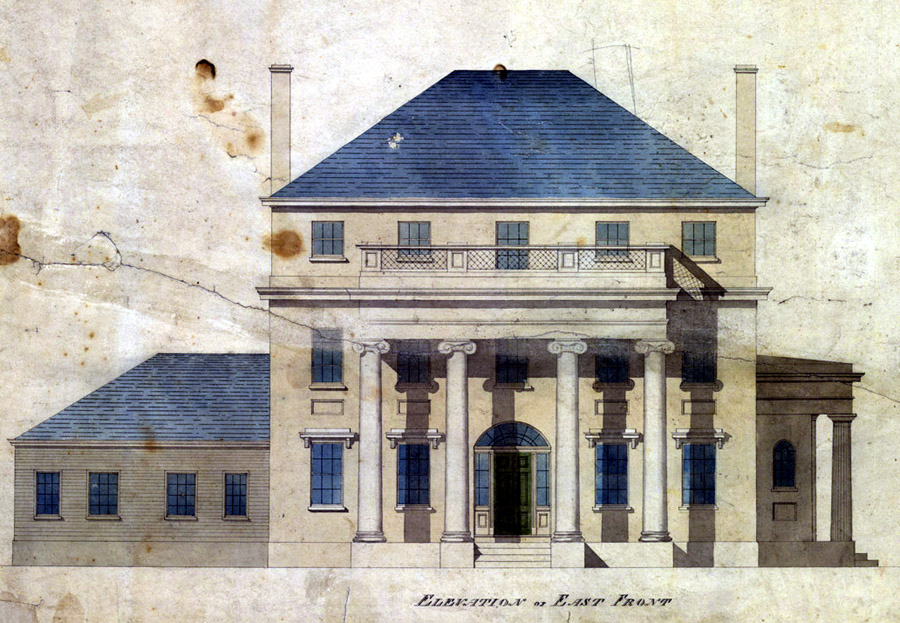
Elevation of East Front, Asa Waters House, 1824, by Asher Benjamin

== See also ==
- National Register of Historic Places listings in Worcester County, Massachusetts
