= Charles Clary Waters House =

Historic house in Arkansas, United States

- U.S. National Register of Historic Places
- U.S. Historic district – Contributing property
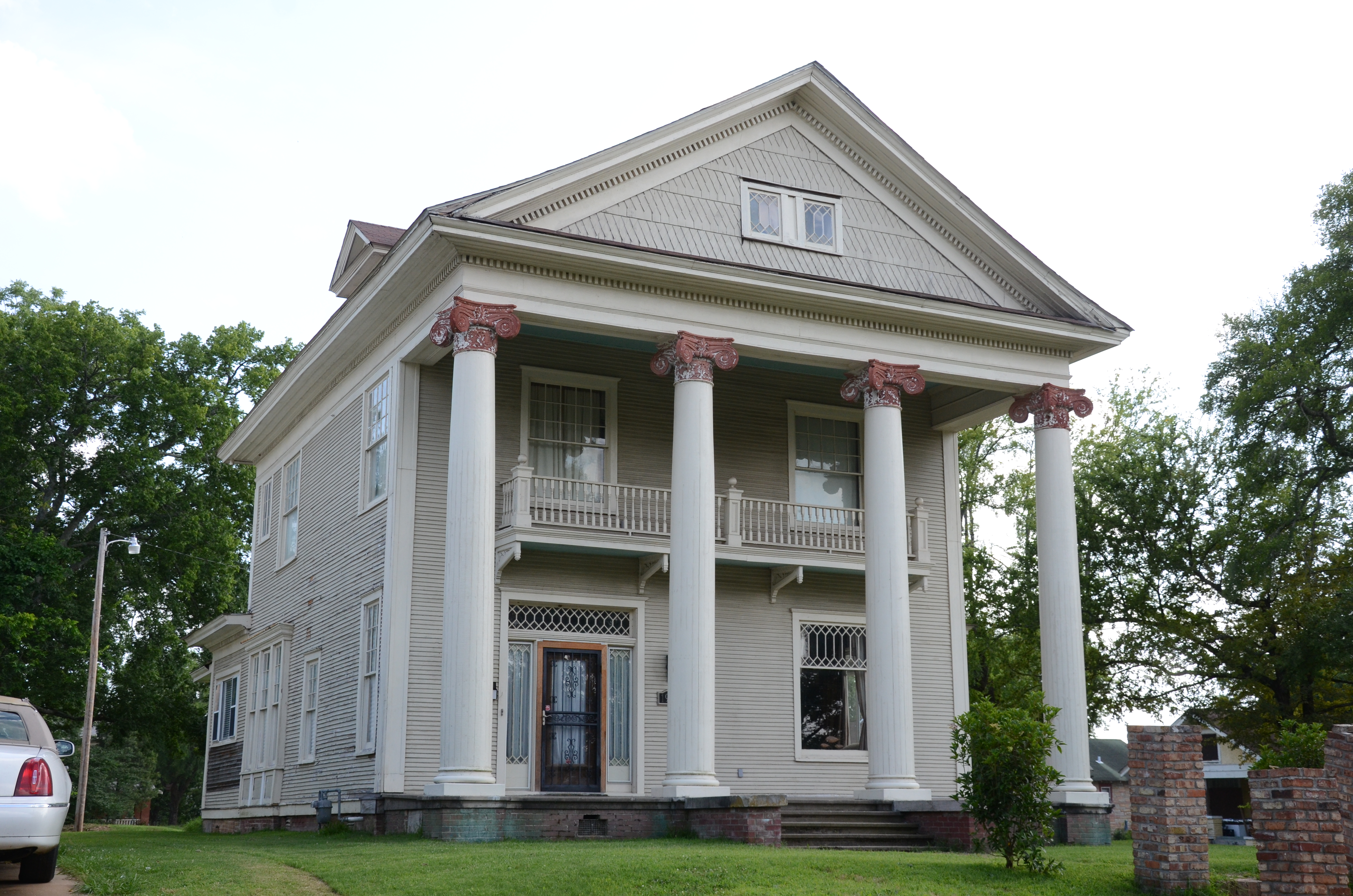

- Location within Arkansas Location within the United States
- Location: 2004 W. 22nd St., Little Rock, Arkansas
- Coordinates: 34°43′42″N 92°17′37″W
- Area: less than one acre
- Built: 1906
- Architectural style: Classical Revival
- Part of: Central High School Neighborhood Historic District (2012 boundary increase) (ID12000320)
- NRHP reference No.: 79000455

Significant dates
- Added to NRHP: August 10, 1979
- Designated CP: June 7, 2012

The Charles Clary Waters House is a historic house at 2004 West 22nd Street in Little Rock, Arkansas. It is a two-story wood-frame structure, with a gabled roof, weatherboard siding, and a brick foundation. Its prominent feature is a massive temple-front portico, with two-story fluted Ionic columns supporting a dentillated entablature and fully pedimented gable. The house was built in 1906, and is a prominent local example of Classical Revival architecture. It was from 1911 to 1927 home to Charles Clary Waters, a prominent local attorney who served for many years as a US District Attorney.

The house was listed on the National Register of Historic Places in 1979.

== See also ==
- National Register of Historic Places listings in Little Rock, Arkansas
