= Albert L. Nash =

American politician

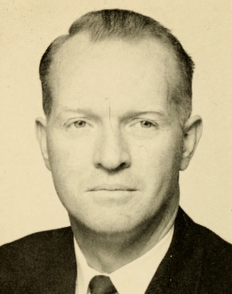

Albert L. Nash (May 13, 1921 – February 4, 2015) was an American politician and businessman.

Born in Millbury, Massachusetts, Nash went to Millbury High School and then served in the United States Army Air Forces during World War II and was a tail gunner. Nash owned a dry cleaning business in Worcester, Massachusetts. He served as the water commissioner and on the board of selectmen. Nash served in the Massachusetts House of Representatives and was a Democrat. Nash died in Leicester, Massachusetts.
