= Millbury, Massachusetts =

Town in Massachusetts, United States

- Town
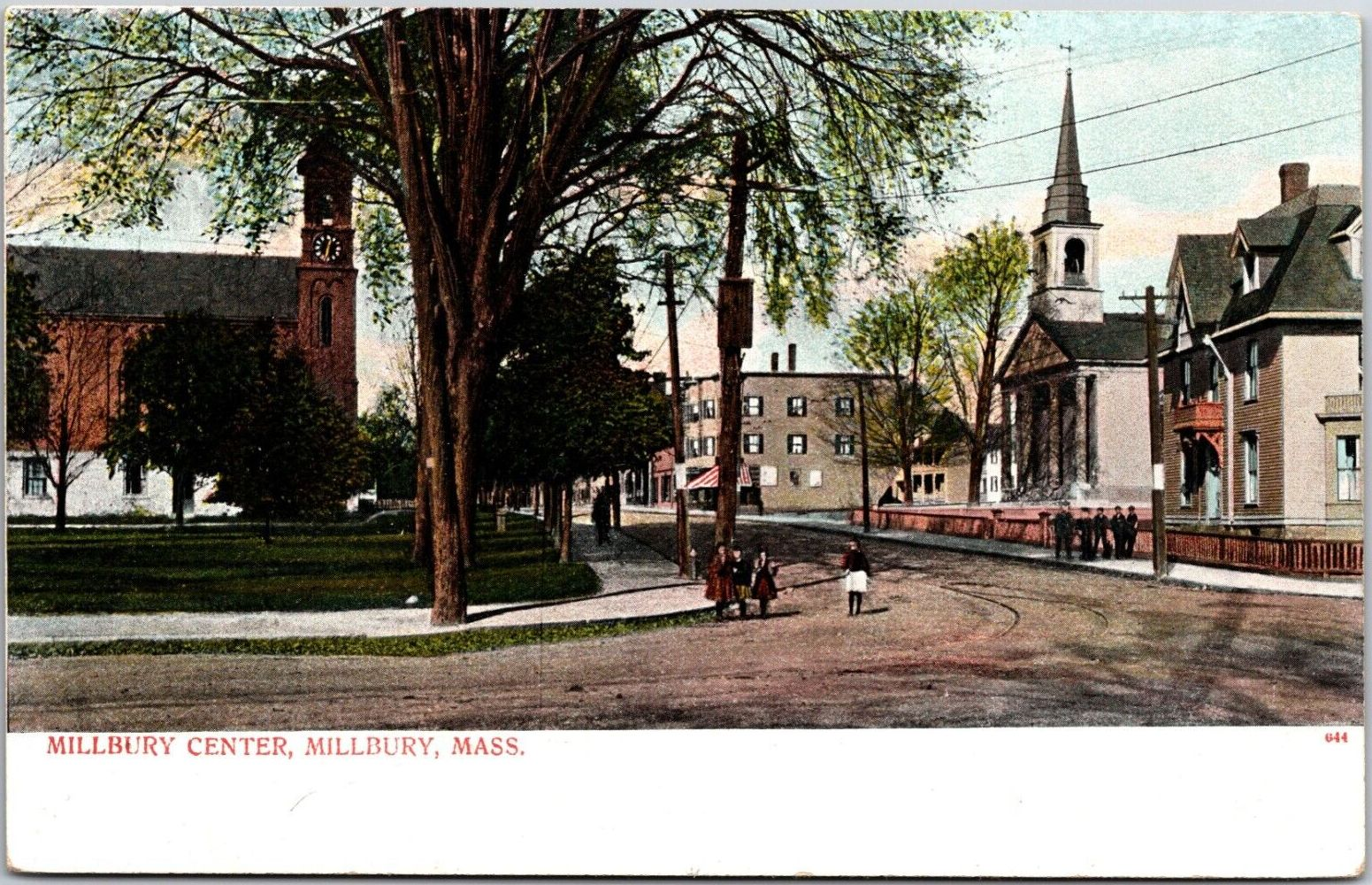
- View of Millbury in circa 1905.

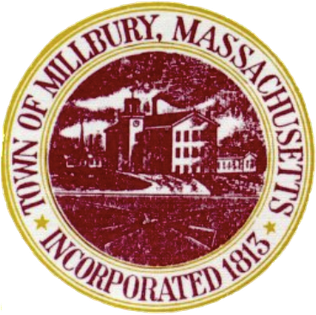
- Seal

- Location in Worcester County and the state of Massachusetts.
- Coordinates: 42°11′38″N 71°45′38″W
- Country: United States
- State: Massachusetts
- County: Worcester
- Settled: 1716
- Incorporated: 1813

Government
  - Type: Open town meeting
  - Town Manager: Karyn Clark
  - Board of Selectmen: Mary Krumsiek; Brian A. Sora; Nicholas Lazzaro; Katherine McKenna; Brian Tagg

Area
  - Total: 16.3 sq mi (42.1 km^{2})
  - Land: 15.7 sq mi (40.7 km^{2})
  - Water: 0.50 sq mi (1.3 km^{2})
- Elevation: 417 ft (127 m)

Population (2020)
  - Total: 13,831
  - Density: 880/sq mi (340/km^{2})
- Time zone: UTC−5 (Eastern)
  - Summer (DST): UTC−4 (Eastern)
- ZIP Code: 01527
- Area code: 508/774
- FIPS code: 25-41340
- GNIS feature ID: 0618373
- Website: www.millburyma.gov

Millbury is a town in Worcester County, Massachusetts, United States. Located within Blackstone Valley, the population in Millbury was 13,831 at the 2020 United States census.

== History ==
Millbury was first settled in 1716. It was originally known as the Second or North Parish of Sutton. Because traveling from one part of the town to the other for meetings was time-consuming, inhabitants of the North Parish petitioned the Massachusetts General Court to split Sutton. North Parish became Millbury on June 11, 1813, by way of an act of incorporation. Its name derived from its long history as a mill town. The Blackstone River flows through the town, and during the Industrial Revolution, provided water power to its many textile mills and factories. During this time, the inventor William Crompton worked in Millbury.

Millbury's industrial history begins in the early eighteenth century, not long after the area's settlement. In 1735, John Singletary began operating a mill on Singletary Brook, a stream flowing out of Singletary Lake. Around 1753, Singletary built the S & D Spinning Mill, which is still in operation, making it one of the oldest continuously operated mills in the United States. The mill is featured on the Town Seal. The mill also makes the inner parts of the Rawlings baseballs for use in Major League Baseball.

In the late eighteenth and early nineteenth centuries, after learning the trade of firearms production from their father, Asa Waters and his brother, Elijah, purchased land along the Blackstone River and built mills producing goods such as guns, scythes, and sawmill equipment. In 1808, they erected an armory, which was successful until forced to close suddenly in 1841. It reopened at the start of the American Civil War in 1861. With the wealth received from the industry, Asa began construction of the Asa Waters Mansion in 1826. Designed by local architect Asher Benjamin, it was completed six years later.

Louise Taft, mother of United States President William Howard Taft, resided in Millbury for many years, and President Taft spent many summer vacations in the town during his youth. He visited his aunt, Delia C. Torrey, during his presidency to celebrate Millbury's centennial. The Torrey House, where President Taft stayed, is now commonly called the Taft House.

In 1824, the mineral called Vermiculite was first found in Millbury.

Due to the Flood Control Act of 1944, the Worcester Flood Diversion Channel was constructed in that year within Millbury, as well as nearby Auburn.

In the early 1970s, Millbury experienced a number of large fires. The town hall burned down, followed by the Union School. A propane plant near Route 146 exploded, causing considerable damage and making nationwide news.

In 2004, Millbury was designated as a Preserve America community.

== Geography ==
According to the United States Census Bureau, Millbury has a total area of 16.3 square miles (42 km^{2}), of which 15.7 square miles (41 km^{2}) is land and 0.5 square miles (1.3 km^{2}), or 3.20%, is water. The town is within the Blackstone Valley and is drained by the Blackstone River.

=== Historic places ===
Millbury has three sites on the National Register of Historic Places:

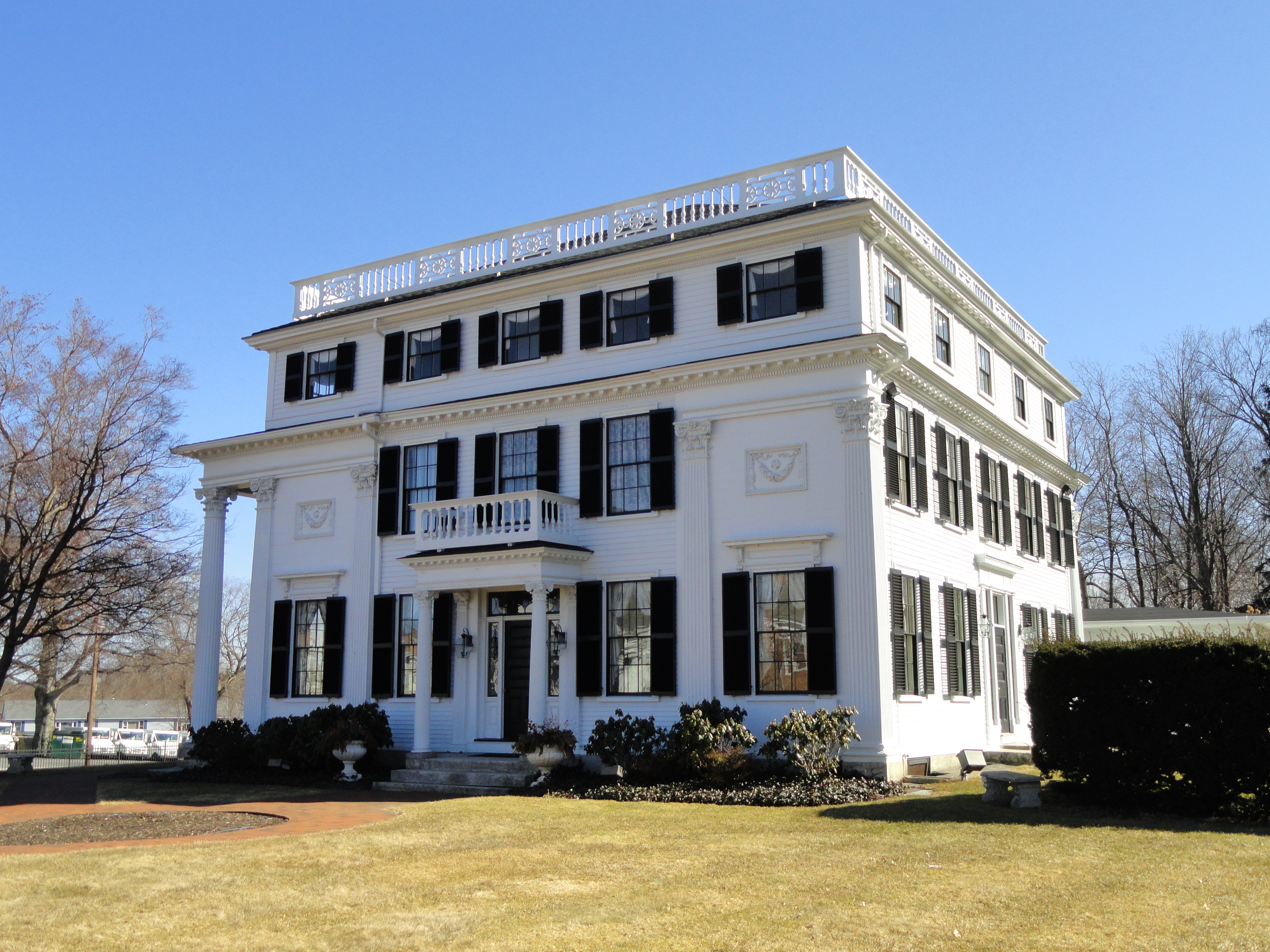
Asa Waters Mansion (1978)

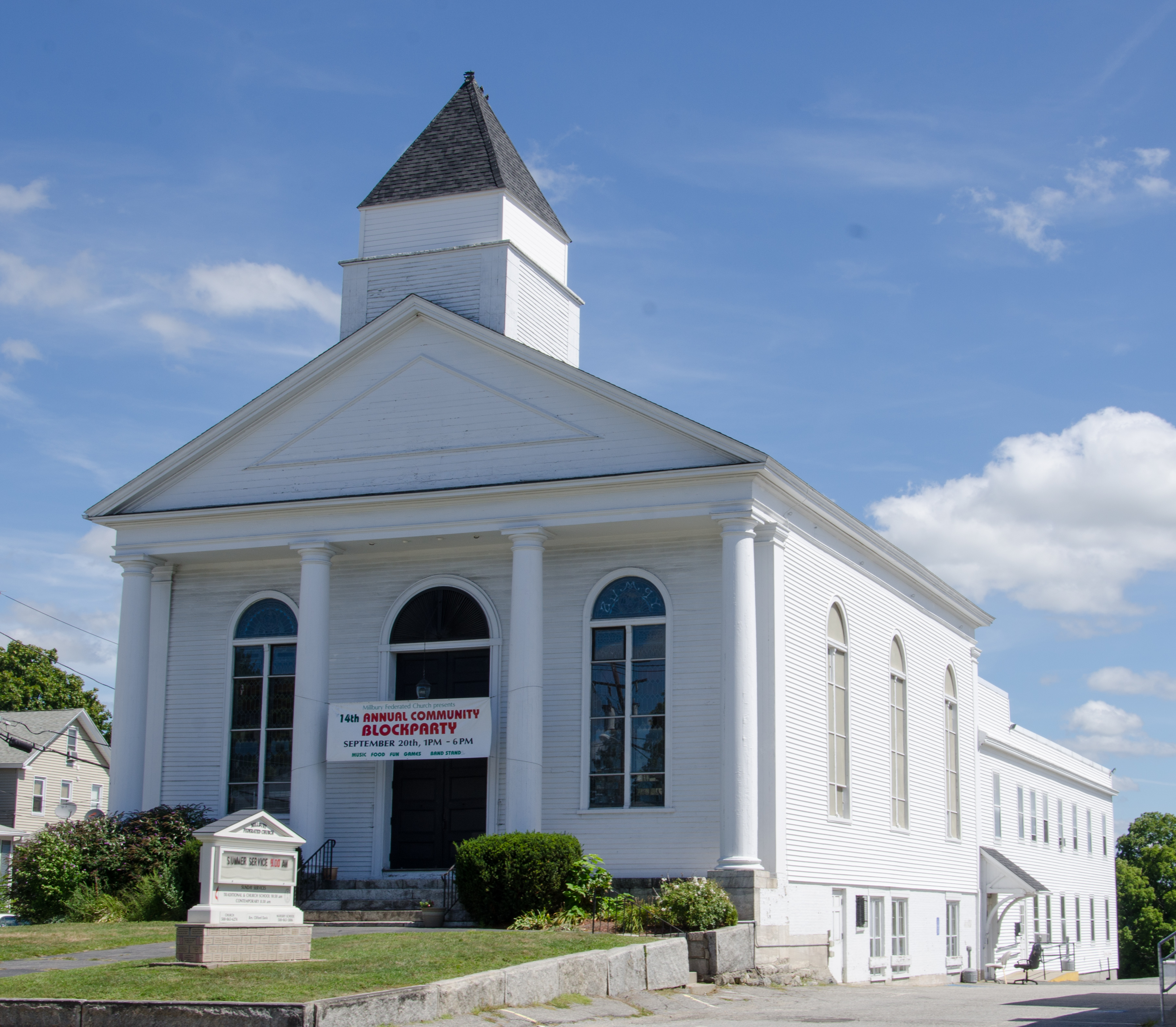
First Presbyterian Society Meeting House (2010)

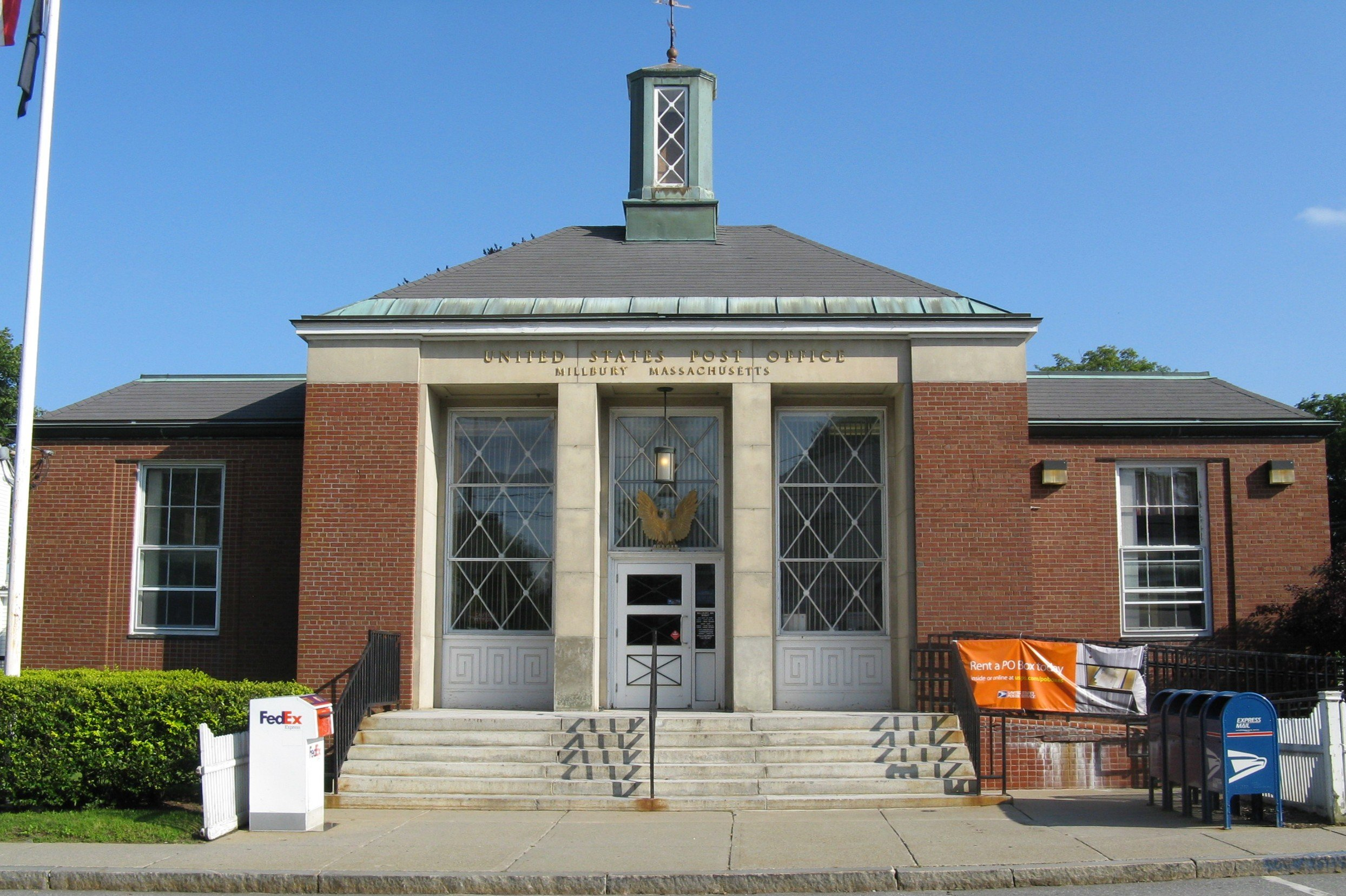
United States Post Office–Millbury Main (1987)

== Demographics ==
Historical population
Year	Pop.	±%
1850	3,081	—
1860	3,296	+7.0%
1870	4,397	+33.4%
1880	4,741	+7.8%
1890	4,428	−6.6%
1900	4,460	+0.7%
1910	4,740	+6.3%
1920	5,653	+19.3%
1930	6,957	+23.1%
1940	6,983	+0.4%
1950	8,347	+19.5%
1960	9,623	+15.3%
1970	11,987	+24.6%
1980	11,808	−1.5%
1990	12,228	+3.6%
2000	12,784	+4.5%
2010	13,261	+3.7%
2020	13,831	+4.3%
2025*	14,276	+3.2%
* = population estimate. Source: United States census records and Population Estimates Program data.

As of the census of 2020, there were 13,831 people, 4,927 households, and 3,443 families residing in the town. The population density was 812.5 inhabitants per square mile (313.7/km^{2}). There were 5,109 housing units at an average density of 324.7 per square mile (125.4/km^{2}). The racial makeup of the town was 97.19% White, 0.53% African American, 0.15% Native American, 1.02% Asian, 0.03% Pacific Islander, 0.23% from other races, and 0.84% from two or more races. Hispanic or Latino of any race were 1.02% of the population.

There were 4,927 households, out of which 30.2% had children under the age of 18 living with them, 55.7% were married couples living together, 10.9% had a female householder with no husband present, and 30.1% were non-families. Of all households, 24.6% were made up of individuals, and 10.3% had someone living alone who was 65 years of age or older. The average household size was 2.53 and the average family size was 3.03.

In the town, the population was spread out, with 23.1% under the age of 18, 6.3% from 18 to 24, 31.2% from 25 to 44, 23.4% from 45 to 64, and 16.0% who were 65 years of age or older. The median age was 39 years. For every 100 females, there were 93.3 males. For every 100 females age 18 and over, there were 88.4 males.

The median income for a household in the town was $51,415, and the median income for a family was $62,564. Males had a median income of $41,912 versus $28,973 for females. The per capita income for the town was $23,531. About 4.1% of families and 6.3% of the population were below the poverty line, including 8.2% of those under age 18 and 8.4% of those age 65 or over

== Education ==
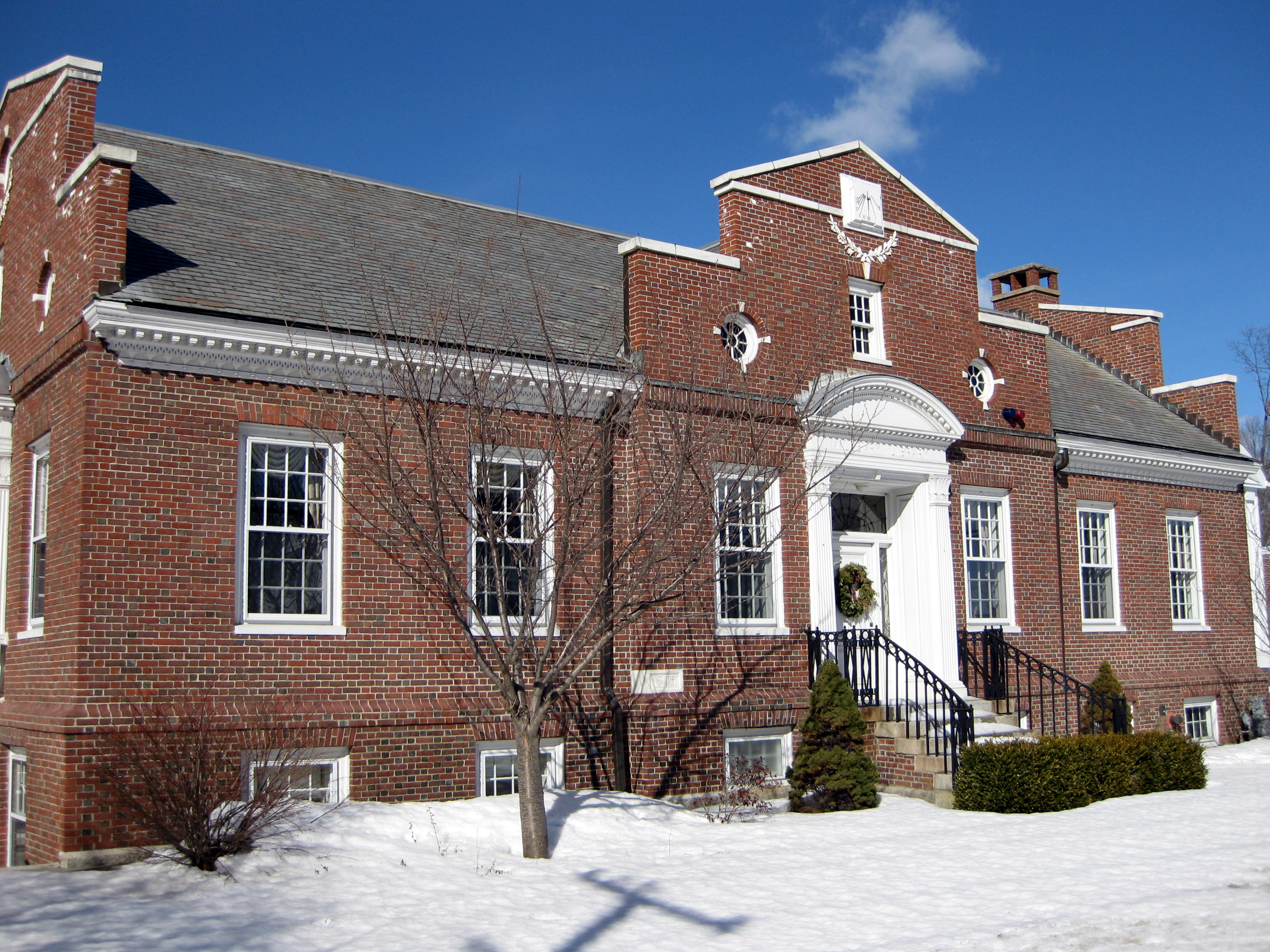
Millbury Public Library in the snow in 2008.

In 1826, the first formal lyceum school was founded by Josiah Holbrook in Millbury.

Public schools in Millbury fall under the jurisdiction of Millbury Public Schools school district. Approximately 2,000 students are educated in three schools: Elmwood Street School, (grades Pre-K through 2); Raymond E. Shaw Elementary School (grades 3 through 6); and Millbury Memorial Junior/Senior High School (grades 7 through 12).

Millbury Public Library opened in 1864. In fiscal year 2008, the town spent 1.15% ($358,097) of its budget on the library.

== Government ==
State government
State Representative(s):	Paul K. Frost (R)
State Senator(s):	Michael O. Moore (D)
Governor's Councilor(s):	Paul DePalo (D)
Federal government
U.S. Representative(s):	Jim McGovern (D)
U.S. Senators:	Elizabeth Warren (D), Ed Markey (D)

Registered Voters and Party Enrollment as of February 1, 2025
Party	Number of Voters	Percentage
Democratic	1,939	17.60%
Republican	1,158	10.51%
Unenrolled	7,810	70.90%
Total	11,016	100%

== Notable people ==
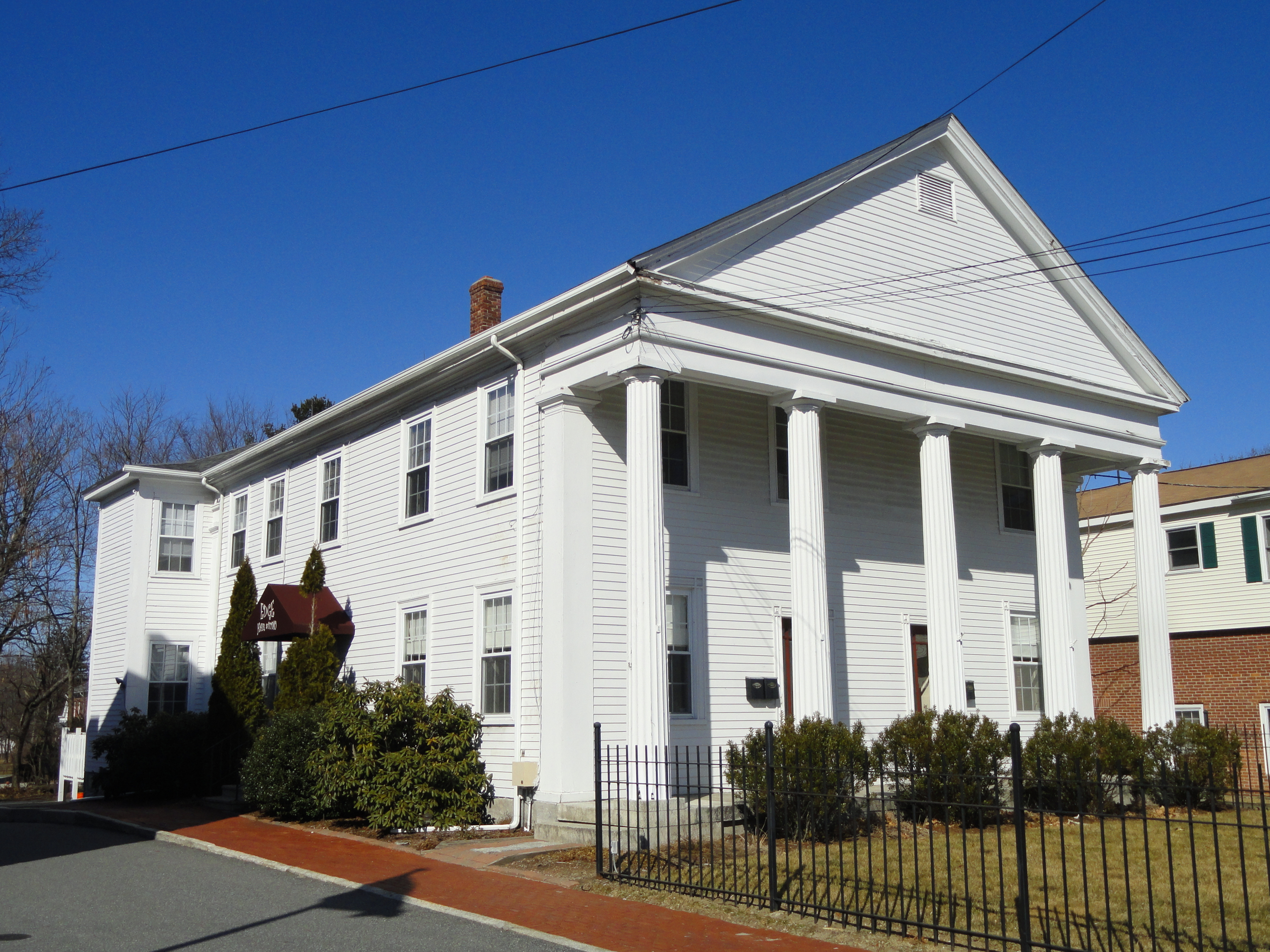
The Torrey House in 2012.

- Ron Darling, Major League Baseball player and member of the New York Mets television broadcast team on SNY.
- Wilton S. Farnsworth, journalist
- Nick Fatool, musician
- Warren G. Harris, member of the Massachusetts Governor's Council
- Abby Kelley, abolitionist
- Francis March, polymath and philologist
- Michael O. Moore, member of the Massachusetts Senate
- Albert L. Nash, politician
- George A. Sheridan, congressman
- Amos Singletary, member of the Massachusetts Senate
- Louise Taft, mother of United States President William Howard Taft
- Asa Waters, industrialist
- George E. White, congressman
- Lawrence Whitney, athlete
- Howie Winter, mobster

== See also ==
- List of mill towns in Massachusetts
