= Bazooka =

Unguided man-portable recoilless antitank rocket

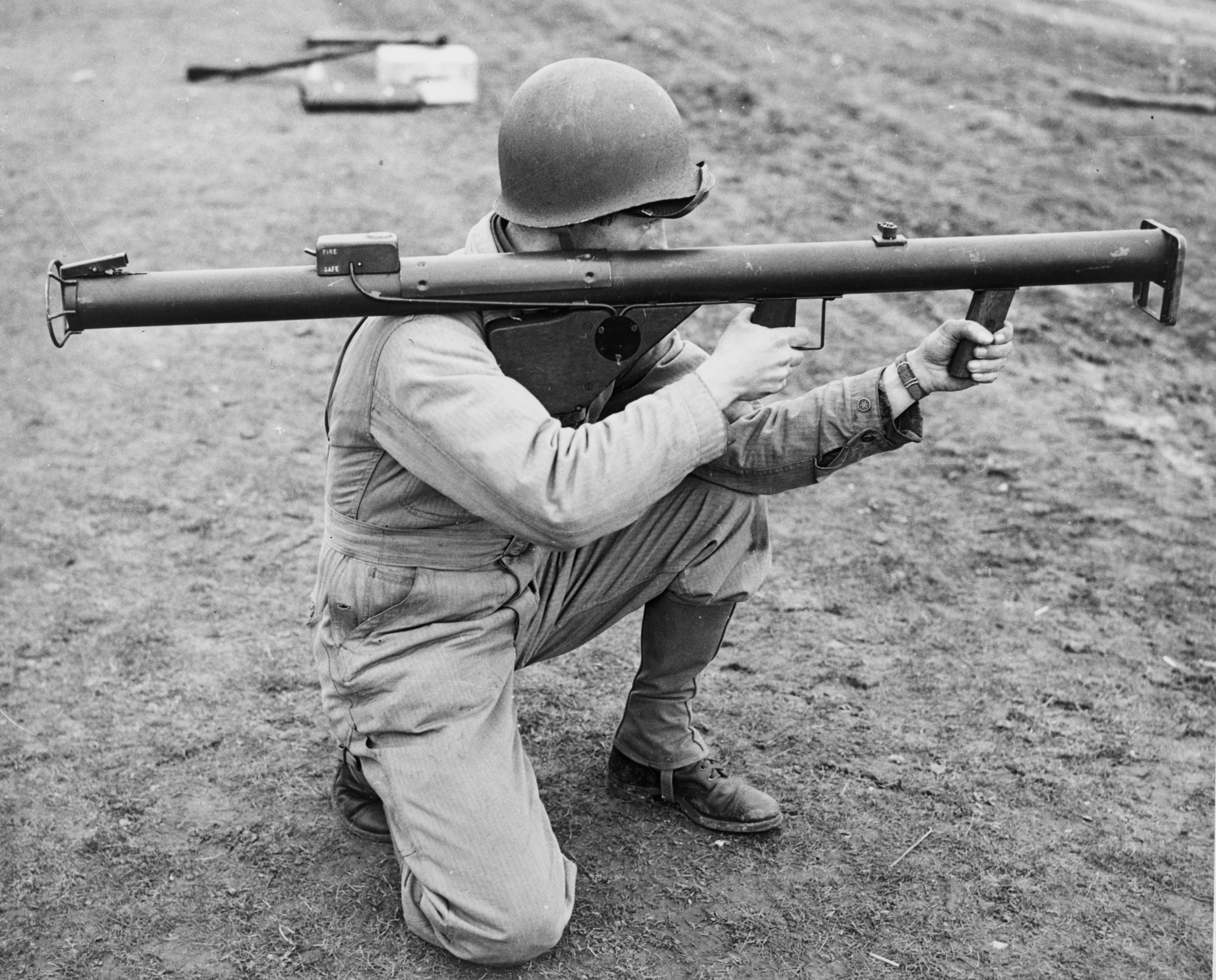
- M1 Bazooka
- Type: Recoilless rocket anti-tank weapon
- Place of origin: United States

Service history
- In service: 1942–present
- Used by: See § Users
- Wars: World War II; Chinese Civil War; First Indochina War; Korean War; Algerian War; Vietnam War; Operation Vantage; The Troubles; Bay of Pigs Invasion; Portuguese Colonial War; Rhodesian Bush War; Yom Kippur War; Lebanese Civil War; Iran–Iraq War; Falklands War; South African Border War

Production history
- Designer: Edward Uhl
- Designed: 1942
- Produced: June 1942 – May 1945 (2.36 inch Bazookas)
- No. built: 112,790 (M1); 59,932 (M1A1); 6,087 (M9); 277,819 (M9A1); Unknown (M20); 1,500 (M25)

The bazooka (/bəˈzuːkə/) is a man-portable recoilless anti-tank rocket launcher weapon, widely deployed by the United States Army, especially during World War II. Also referred to as the "stovepipe", the innovative bazooka was among the first generation of rocket-propelled anti-tank weapons used in infantry combat. Featuring a solid-propellant rocket for propulsion, it allowed for high-explosive anti-tank (HEAT) shaped charge warheads to be delivered against armored vehicles, machine gun nests, and fortified bunkers at ranges beyond that of a standard thrown grenade or mine. The universally applied nickname arose from the weapon's M1 variant's vague resemblance to the musical instrument called a bazooka invented and popularized by 1930s American comedian Bob Burns.

During World War II, the German armed forces captured several bazookas in early North African and Eastern Front encounters and soon reverse engineered their own version, increasing the warhead diameter to 8.8 cm (among other minor changes) and widely issuing it as the Raketenpanzerbüchse "Panzerschreck" ("rocket anti-armor rifle 'tank terror'"). Near the end of the war, the Japanese developed a similar weapon, the Type 4 70 mm AT rocket launcher, which featured a rocket-propelled grenade of a different design. During the Korean War, the M1 and M9 Bazooka series was replaced by the larger caliber M20 Super Bazooka.

The term "bazooka" still sees informal use as a generic term referring to any shoulder fired ground-to-ground/ground-to-air missile weapon (mainly rocket-propelled grenade launchers or recoilless rifles), and as an expression that heavy measures are being taken.

== Name ==
The name "bazooka" comes from an extension of the word bazoo, which is slang for "mouth" or "boastful talk", and which probably stems from the Dutch bazuin (buisine, a medieval trumpet). The word bazooka appears in the 1909 novel The Swoop, or how Clarence Saved England by P. G. Wodehouse, describing the character Grand Duke Vodkakoff and a musical instrument used in music halls: "I shouldn't 'arf wonder, from the look of him, if he wasn't the 'aughty kind of a feller who'd cleave you to the bazooka for tuppence with his bloomin' falchion."

During World War II, "bazooka" became the universally applied nickname of the new American anti-tank weapon, due to its vague resemblance to the musical instrument invented and popularized by 1930s American comedian Bob Burns.

Shortly after the first prototype launcher and rockets had been tested by firing into the Potomac River, U.S. Army colonel Leslie Skinner, and Lieutenant Colonel Edward Uhl took the new system to a competitive trial of various types of spigot mortar, at that time seen as the most promising way to deliver a shaped charge, which was held at the Aberdeen Proving Ground in May 1942. The new rocket launcher scored several hits on a moving tank while the five different mortars achieved none; this was a considerable achievement since the launcher's sights had been fabricated that morning from a wire clothes hanger bent with a broken nail. The trial was watched by various senior officers, among them the chief of research and engineering in the Ordnance Department, Major General Gladeon M. Barnes. Barnes was delighted by the performance of the system and fired it as well, but commented, "It sure looks like Bob Burns' bazooka."

== History ==
=== Design and development ===
The development of the bazooka involved the development of two specific lines of technology: the rocket-powered weapon and the shaped charge warhead. It was also designed for easy maneuverability and access.

==== World War I ====
This rocket-powered weapon was the brainchild of Robert H. Goddard as a side project (under U.S. Army contract during World War I) of his work on rocket propulsion. Goddard, during his tenure at Clark University, and while working at Worcester Polytechnic Institute's magnetic lab and Mount Wilson Observatory (for security reasons), designed a tube-fired rocket for military use. He and his co-worker Clarence N. Hickman successfully demonstrated his rocket to the U.S. Army Signal Corps at Aberdeen Proving Ground, Maryland, on November 6, 1918, but as the Compiègne Armistice was signed only five days later, development was discontinued. The project was also interrupted by Goddard's serious bout with tuberculosis. He continued to be a part-time consultant to the U.S. government at Indian Head, Maryland, until 1923, but turned his focus to other projects involving rocket propulsion. Hickman completed the development of the bazooka after becoming head of the National Defense Research Committee in the 1940s, where he guided rocket development for the war effort.

==== Shaped charge development ====
Shaped charge technology was developed in the U.S. into a shaped charge anti-tank grenade for use by infantry, effective at defeating up to 60 mm (2.4 in) of vehicle armor. The grenade was standardized as the M10. However, the M10 grenade weighed 3.5 lb (1.6 kg), proving difficult to throw by hand and too heavy to be launched as a rifle grenade. The only practical way to use the weapon was for an infantryman to place it directly on the tank, a dangerous and unlikely means of delivery in most combat situations. A smaller, less powerful, version of the M10, the M9, was then developed, which could be fired from a rifle. This resulted in the creation of a series of rifle grenade launchers, the M1 (Springfield M1903), the M2 (Enfield M1917), the M7 (M1 Garand), and the M8 (M1 carbine). However, a truly capable anti-tank weapon had yet to be found, and following the lead of other countries at the time, the U.S. Army prepared to evaluate competing designs for a more effective man-portable anti-tank weapon. The combination of rocket motor and shaped charge warhead led to the Army's development of light antitank weapons.

==== Rocket-borne shaped charge weapons development ====
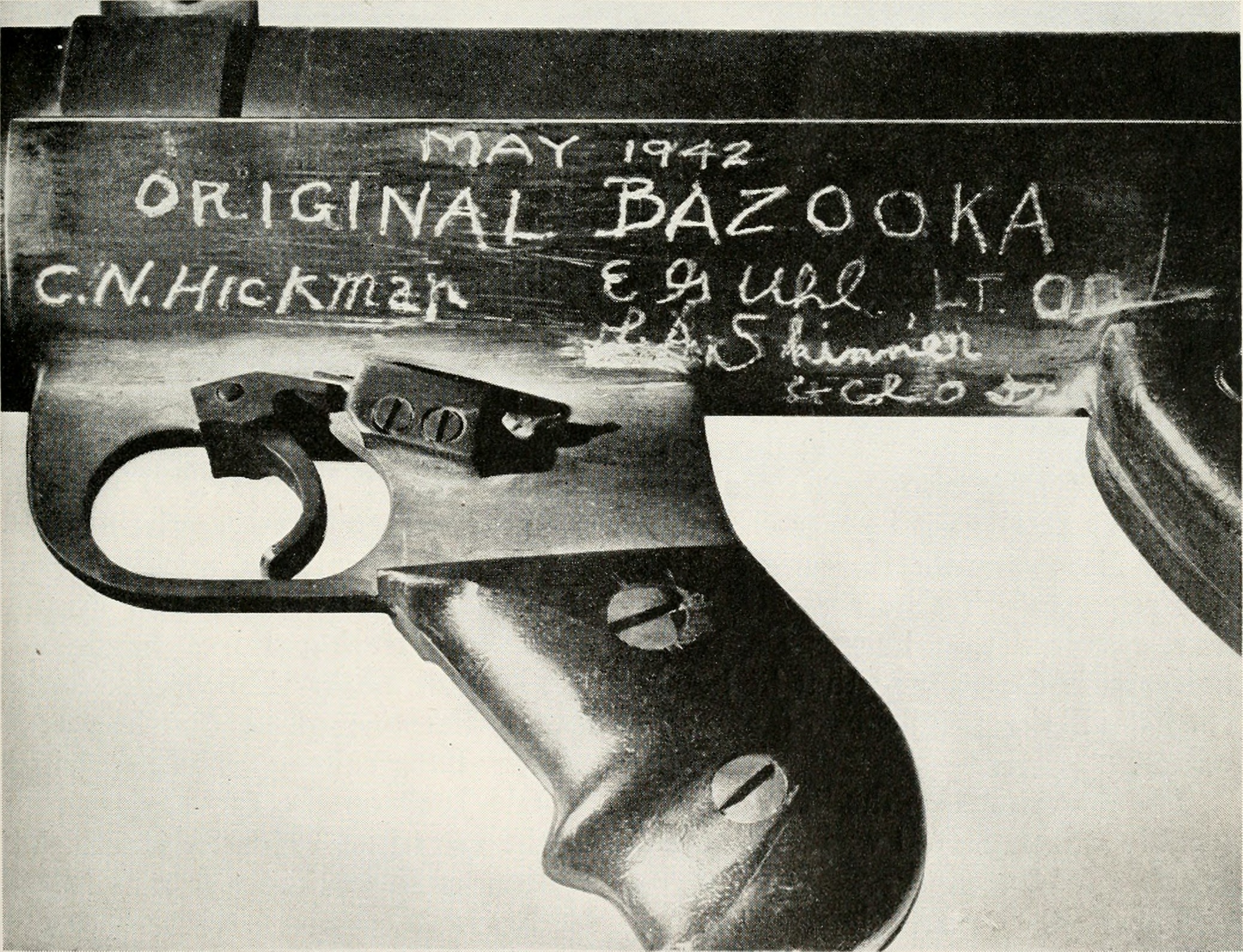
A prototype of the world's first "tube-type rocket-propelled grenade launcher", the grip part of the "Original Bazooka" is marked "May 1942" and is signed by the development team including Hickman, Skinner, and Uhl

In 1942, U.S. Army Colonel Leslie Skinner received the M10 shaped-charge grenade which was capable of stopping German tanks. He gave Lieutenant Edward Uhl the task of creating a delivery system for the grenade. Uhl created a small rocket, but needed to protect the operator from the rocket motor's exhaust. According to Uhl:

I was walking by this scrap pile, and there was a tube that... happened to be the same size as the grenade that we were turning into a rocket. I said, That's the answer! Put the tube on a soldier's shoulder with the rocket inside, and away it goes.

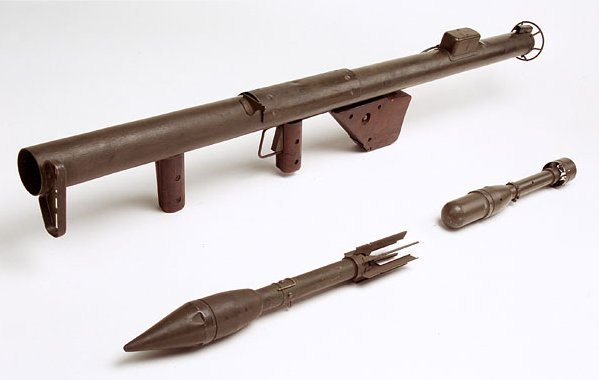
An M1 Bazooka with M6A1 and M6A3 rockets

At the launcher's first firing test, Uhl wore a welding helmet, but discovered that there was not enough exhaust from the rocket to require protective equipment. The prototype launcher was demonstrated in May 1942 at a competitive trial of various types of spigot mortars at Aberdeen Proving Ground. On the morning of the trial Skinner and Uhl realised that the launcher had no sights, so they improvised some from a wire coathanger; despite this, it was the only weapon in the trial to be able to hit a moving tank. This led to the launcher being demonstrated to General George C. Marshall, the Chief of Staff of the United States Army, who ordered 5,000 units on the spot. By late 1942, the improved Rocket launcher, M1A1 was introduced. The forward hand grip was deleted, and the design simplified. The production M1A1 was 55 inches (1.37 m) long and weighed 12.75 pounds (5.8 kg).

The ammunition for the original M1 launcher was the M6 ("trials" code: T1), which was notoriously unreliable. The M6 was improved and designated M6A1, and the new ammunition was issued with the improved M1A1 launcher. After the M6, several alternative warheads were introduced. Many older M1 launchers were modified to M1A1 standards in July and August 1943. Batches of M6 rockets designated M6A2 were overhauled with the latest ignition systems and had been modified to be able to be fired from the upgraded M1 launchers. The M6A3 rocket featured a blunt, rounded nose to lessen the chances of it ricocheting off angled armor. The M6A3 was meant to be fired from the M9, and later M9A1, launchers. Late in World War II, the M6A4 and M6A5 rockets with improved fuses were developed. These rockets arrived too late to see service during the war, but were used post-war.

The 2.36 inch (60 mm) smoke rocket M10 and its improved subvariants (M10A1, M10A2, M10A4) used the rocket motor and fin assembly of the M6A1, but replaced the anti-tank warhead with a white phosphorus (WP) smoke head. WP smoke not only acts as a visibility screen, but its burning particles can cause severe injuries to skin. The M10 was therefore used to mark targets, to blind enemy gunners or vehicle drivers, or to drive troops out of bunkers and dugouts. The 2.36-inch incendiary rocket T31 was an M10 variant with an incendiary warhead designed to ignite fires in enemy-held structures and unarmored vehicles, or to destroy combustible supplies, ammunition, and materiel; it was not often utilized.

The original M1 and M1A1 rocket launchers were equipped with simple fixed sights and used launch tubes without reinforcements. During the war, the M1A1 received a number of running modifications. The battery specification was changed to a larger, standard battery cell size, resulting in complaints of batteries getting stuck in the wood shoulder rest (the compartment was later reamed out to accommodate the larger cells). The M1 and M1A1 used rear iron sights and front rectangular "ladder" sights positioned at the muzzles. The vertical sides of the ladder sight were inscribed with graduations of 100, 200, 300, and 400 yards, with the user elevating the bazooka so the rear sight lined up with the selected "rung" on the front sight. On the M9, the ladder sight was replaced by the General Electric T43 aperture sight. Ranging was accomplished by looking through the rear sight's peep hole while rotating the assembly (which had graduations of 100, 200, and 300 yards) so it lined up with the blade positioned at the muzzle. In September 1944, during the production of the M9A1, the T43 sight was replaced by the Polaroid T90 optical reflector sight, which used an etched reticle for aiming. The T43 and T90 sights were interchangeable. Various types of blast deflectors were tried, and an additional strap iron shoulder brace was fitted to the M9 launcher.

The bazooka required special care when used in tropical or arctic climates or in severe dust or sand conditions. Rockets were not to be fired at temperatures below 0 °F or above 120 °F (−18 °C to +49 °C).

==== Field experience-induced changes ====
In 1943, field reports of rockets sticking and prematurely detonating in M1A1 launch tubes were received by Army Ordnance at Ogden Arsenal and other production facilities. At the U.S. Army's Aberdeen Proving Grounds, various metal collars and wire wrapping were used on the sheet metal launch tube in an effort to reinforce it. However, reports of premature detonation continued until the development of bore slug test gauges to ensure that the rocket did not catch inside the launch tube.

The original M6 and M6A1 rockets used in the M1 and M1A1 launchers had pointed noses, which were found to cause deflection from the target at low impact angles. In late 1943, another 2.36-in rocket type was adopted, the M6A3, for use with the newly standardized M9 rocket launcher. The M6A3 was 19.4 inches (493 mm) long, and weighed 3.38 lb (1.53 kg). It had a blunted, more round nose to improve target effect at low angles, and a new circular fin assembly to improve flight stability. The M6A3 was capable of penetrating 3.5–4 inches (89–102 mm) of armor plate.

Battery problems in the early bazookas eventually resulted in replacement of the battery-powered ignition system with a magneto sparker system operated through the trigger. A trigger safety was incorporated into the design that isolated the magneto, preventing misfires that could occur when the trigger was released and the stored charge prematurely fired the rocket. The final major change was the division of the launch tube into two discrete sections, with bayonet-joint attachments. This was done to make the weapon more convenient to carry, particularly for use by airborne forces. The final two-piece launcher was standardized as the M9A1. In September 1944, the fragile folding aperture sight was replaced by a Polaroid optical reflector sight. However, the long list of incorporated modifications increased the launcher's tube length to 61 inches (1.55 m), with an overall empty weight of 14.3 lb (6.5 kg). From its original conception as a relatively light, handy, and disposable weapon, the final M9A1 launcher had become a heavy, clumsy, and relatively complex piece of equipment.

In October 1944, after receiving reports of inadequate combat effect of the M1A1 and M9 launchers and their M6A1 rockets, and after examining captured examples of the German 8.8 cm RPzB 43 and RPzB 54 Panzerschreck, the U.S. Ordnance Corps began development on a new, more powerful anti-tank rocket launcher, the 3.5-inch (90 mm) M20. However, the weapon's design was not completed until after the war and saw no action against an enemy until the Korean War.

In 1945, the U.S. Army's Chemical Warfare Service standardized improved chemical warfare rockets intended for the new M9 and M9A1 launchers, the Army adopted the M26 gas rocket, a cyanogen chloride (CK)-filled warhead for the 2.36-in rocket launcher. CK, a deadly blood agent, was capable of penetrating the protective filter barriers in some gas masks, and was seen as an effective agent against Japanese forces (particularly those hiding in caves or bunkers), whose gas masks lacked the impregnants that would provide protection against the chemical reaction of CK. While stockpiled in US inventory, the CK rocket was never deployed or issued to combat personnel.

==== Aviation use ====
During Operation Overlord, the L-4 Grasshopper, a slow monoplane, began to be used in a light anti-armor role by a few U.S. Army artillery spotter units over France; these aircraft were field-outfitted with either two or four bazookas attached to the lift struts. Upon arriving in France in 1944, Major Charles Carpenter, an Army aviator flying liaison and spotter light planes, was issued a new L-4H version during the concluding stages of Overlord, taking this "light attack" role against German armor by himself. With a 150-pound pilot and no radio aboard, the L-4H had a combined cargo and passenger weight capacity of approximately 232 pounds. This margin allowed him to eventually mount a total of six Bazookas, three per side on the lift struts as other L-4s had done.

Within a few weeks, Carpenter was credited with knocking out a German armored car and four tanks. Carpenter's plane was known as "Rosie the Rocketer," and his exploits were soon featured in press accounts. During the critical late-September Battle of Arracourt, Carpenter managed to disable several German armored cars and two Panther tanks, along with killing or wounding a dozen or more enemy soldiers.

In the opening months of the Korean War, in August 1950, a joint U.S. Navy and Marine Corps test used a newly acquired Bell HTL-4 helicopter to test if a bazooka could be fired from a helicopter in flight. One of the larger, 3.5 inch, models of the bazooka was chosen, and was mounted ahead and to the right of the helicopter to allow the door to remain clear. The bazooka was successfully tested, although it was discovered that it would require shielding for the engine compartment, which was exposed in the model 47 and other early helicopters. The helicopter itself belonged to HMX-1, a marine experimental helicopter squadron.

=== Operational use ===
==== World War II ====
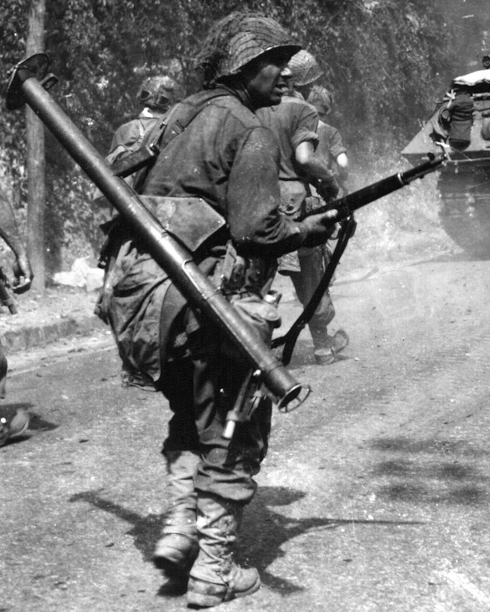
American soldier with an M1A1 Bazooka on August 23, 1944, near Fontainebleau, France

In September 1942, a consignment of 600 M1 Bazookas was shipped to Egypt for use by the British Army in the Western Desert campaign. In a demonstration to British commanders, a bazooka penetrated the frontal armor of a captured Panzer III; however it was decided that the desert terrain lacked the concealment required for such a short range weapon and it was not deployed in that theater. In November 1942 during Operation Torch, early production versions of the M1 launcher and M6 rocket were hastily supplied to some of the U.S. invasion forces during the landings in North Africa. On the night before the landings, General Dwight D. Eisenhower was shocked to learn from a subordinate that none of his troops had received any instruction in the use of the bazooka.

Initially supplied with the highly unreliable M6 rocket and without training for its operators, the M1 did not play a significant armed role in combat in the North African fighting, but did provide a German intelligence coup when some were captured by the Germans in early encounters with inexperienced U.S. troops. An American general visiting the Tunisian front in 1943 after the close of combat operations could not find any soldiers who could report that the weapon had actually stopped an enemy tank. Further issue of the Bazooka was suspended in May 1943.

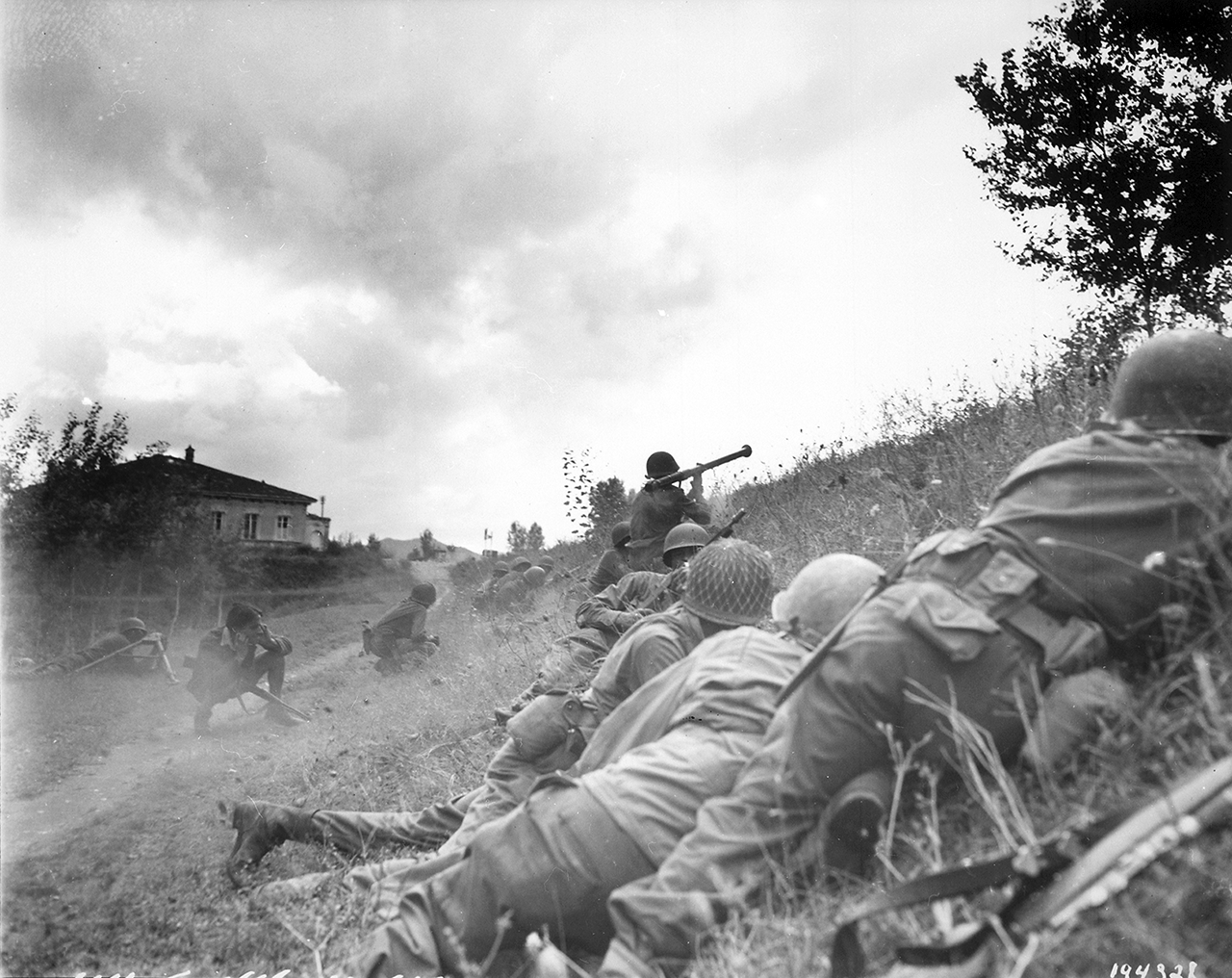
A U.S. soldier fires an M9 Bazooka at a German machine gun nest, Lucca 1944

During the Allied invasion of Sicily, small numbers of the M1A1 Bazooka (using an improved rocket, the M6A1) were used in combat by U.S. forces. The M1A1 accounted for four medium German tanks and a heavy Tiger I, with the latter being knocked out by an improbable hit through the driver's vision slot.

When the existence of the bazooka was revealed to the American public, official press releases for the first two years stated that it "packed the wallop of a 155 mm cannon"—a great exaggeration.

In late 1942, numbers of early-production American M1 Bazookas were captured by German troops from Red Army forces who had been given quantities under Lend-Lease. There were also examples captured during the Operation Torch invasions in the North African Campaign. The Germans promptly developed their own version of the weapon called the Panzerschreck, increasing the diameter of the warhead from 60 mm to 88 mm (2.4 to 3.5 in), which as a result, gave it significantly greater armor penetration. During U.S. trials of the M1, calls for a larger-diameter warhead had also been raised by some ordnance officers but were rejected. Later in the war, after participating in an armor penetration test involving a German Panther tank using both the Raketenpanzerbüchse, or RPzB 54 Panzerschreck and the U.S. M9 Bazooka, Corporal Donald E. Lewis of the U.S. Army informed his superiors that the Panzerschreck was "far superior to the American Bazooka": 'I was so favorably impressed [by the Panzerschreck] I was ready to take after the Krauts with their own weapon.'

The M1 Bazooka fared much better on the rare occasions when it could be used against the much thinner armor typically fitted to the lower sides, undersides, and tops of enemy tanks. To hit the bottom of an enemy tank, the bazooka operator had to wait until the tank was surmounting a steep hill or other obstruction, while hitting the top armor usually necessitated firing the rocket from the upper story of a building or a similar, elevated, position. Even the heavy King Tiger tank only possessed hull and turret top armor of 44 mm (1 3/4 in) thickness at best, which the bazooka's shaped-charge rocket could pierce. During the 1944 Allied offensive in France, when some liaison aircraft with the U.S. Army began to be experimentally field-armed, and were already flying with pairs or quartets of the American ordnance—and most notably used during the Battle of Arracourt—Major Charles "Bazooka Charlie" Carpenter mounted a battery of three M9 Bazookas on the wing-to-fuselage struts on each side of his L-4 Grasshopper aircraft to attack top enemy armor, and was credited with destroying six enemy tanks, including two Tiger I heavy tanks. In the hands of American infantry the bazooka still enjoyed rare successes against heavy Nazi armored fighting vehicles. In 1945, during the failed German Operation Nordwind offensive, a bazooka team managed the unlikely achievement of destroying a Jagdtiger heavy tank destroyer, the most heavily armored fighting vehicle of World War II. The team managed to do this by positioning themselves to get a shot at the massive vehicle's thinner side armor, scoring a direct hit on the ammunition bustle and causing a catastrophic kill. This incident shows that when correctly aimed at vulnerable points on vehicles the bazooka could still be effective against even the best-protected of armored vehicles, though it required significant skill to accomplish.

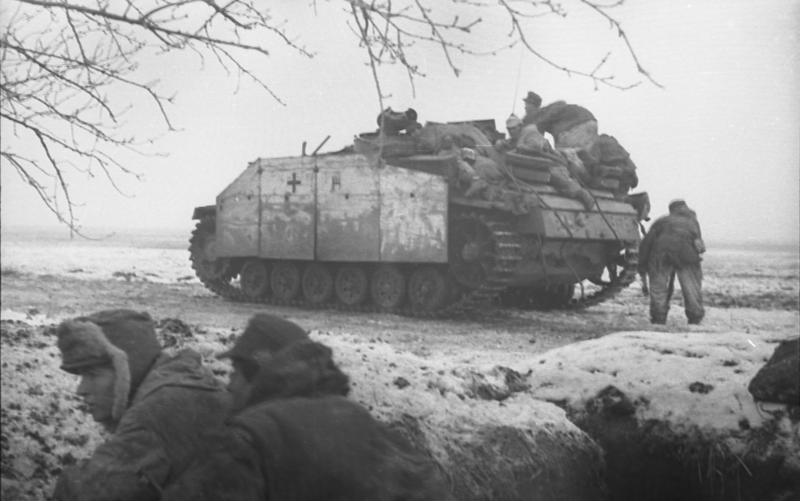
A German StuG III with Schürzen armor skirts

In a letter dated May 20, 1944, General George S. Patton stated to a colleague that "the purpose of the Bazooka is not to hunt tanks offensively, but to be used as a last resort in keeping tanks from overrunning infantry. To insure this, the range should be held to around 30 yards."

In the Pacific campaign, as in North Africa, the original bazookas sent to combat often had reliability issues. The battery-operated firing circuit was easily damaged during rough handling, and the rocket motors often failed because of high temperatures and exposure to moisture, salt air, or humidity. With the introduction of the M1A1 and its more reliable rocket ammunition, the bazooka was effective against some fixed Japanese infantry emplacements such as small concrete bunkers and pillboxes. Against coconut and sand emplacements, the weapon was not always effective, as these softer structures often reduced the force of the warhead's impact enough to prevent detonation of the explosive charge. Later in the Pacific war, Army and Marine units often used the M2 flamethrower to attack such emplacements. In the few instances in the Pacific where the bazooka was used against tanks and armored vehicles, the rocket's warhead easily penetrated the thin armor used by the Japanese and destroyed the vehicle. Overall, the M1A1, M9, and M9A1 rocket launchers were viewed as useful and effective weapons during World War II, though they had been primarily employed against enemy emplacements and fixed fortifications, not as anti-tank weapons. General Dwight Eisenhower later described it as one of the four "tools of victory" which won World War II for the Allies (together with the atom bomb, Jeep and the C-47 Skytrain transport aircraft).

During the war, bazookas were provided by Lend-Lease to the United Kingdom, Brazil, Canada, China, and Free French forces as well as the Soviet Union. Some were supplied to French maquis and Yugoslav partisans.

==== Korean War ====
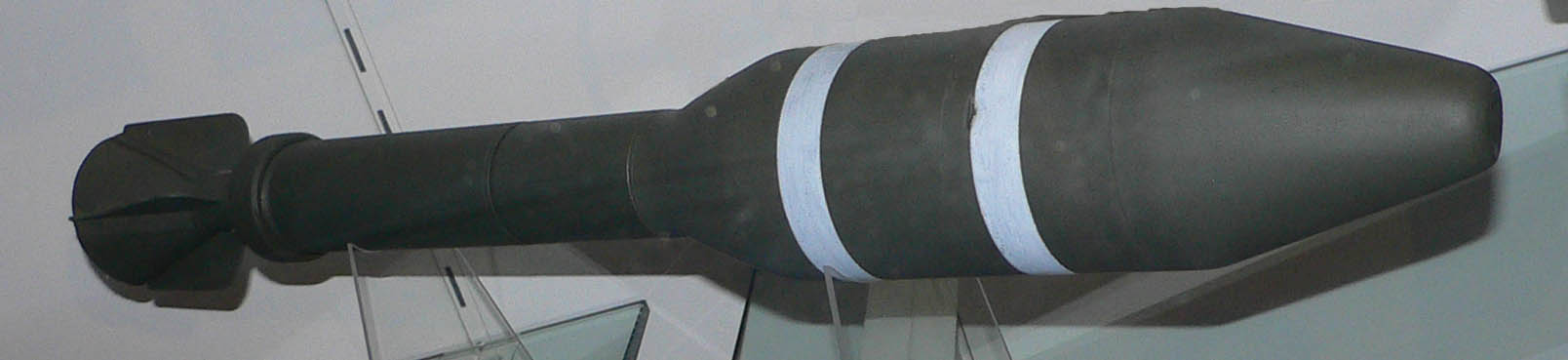
A 3.5 inch Bazooka rocket—loader training projectile

The success of the more powerful German Panzerschreck caused the bazooka to be completely redesigned at the close of World War II. A larger, 3.5 in (89 mm) model was adopted, the M20 "Super Bazooka". Though bearing a superficial resemblance to the Panzerschreck, the M20 had greater effective range and penetrating capability and was nearly 20% lighter than its German counterpart. The M20 weighed 14.3 pounds (6.5 kg) and fired a hollow shaped-charge 9 lb (4 kg) M28A2 HEAT rocket when used in an anti-tank role. It was also operated by a two-man team and had a rate of fire of six shots per minute. As with its predecessor, the M20 could also fire rockets with either practice (M29A2) or WP smoke (T127E3/M30) warheads. Having learned from experience of the sensitivity of the bazooka and its ammunition to moisture and harsh environments, the ammunition for the new weapon was packaged in moisture-resistant packaging, and the M20's field manual contained extensive instructions on launcher lubrication and maintenance, as well as storage of rocket ammunition. When prepared for shipment from the arsenal, the weapon was protected by antifungal coatings over all electrical contacts, in addition to a cosmoline coating in the hand-operated magneto that ignited the rocket. Upon issue, these coatings were removed with solvent to ready the M20 for actual firing. However, budget cutbacks initiated by Secretary of Defense Louis A. Johnson in the years following World War II effectively canceled the intended widespread issue of the M20, and initial U.S. forces deploying to Korea were armed solely with the M9/M9A1 2.36-in. launcher and old stockpiled World War II inventories of M6A3 rocket ammunition.

At the outbreak of the Korean War, the South Korean military had 1,958 M9A1 rocket launchers that were given by the U.S. Forces Korea during the withdrawal in 1948 to 1949, the only anti-tank firearms that the South Koreans had secured in sufficient quantities. However, the 2.36-inch rocket launcher could not penetrate the front armor of T-34-85s, which were the biggest threat. The South Koreans responded by firing rockets into the side, rear, or tracks through ambushes, but they did not have much effect.

At the same time, the U.S. military dispatched its first troops to the Korean Peninsula without trusting reports that a 2.36-inch rocket could not destroy North Korean tanks. On July 5, 1950, during the Battle of Osan, Task Force Smith tried to stop North Korean tanks with 2.36-inch rocket launchers and 75 mm recoilless rifles but was overrun by 33 T-34-85s. One of the North Korean T-34s received a total of 22 shots on the side and rear at about 10 meters in distance, but survived.

On July 8, Colonel Robert R. Martin, commander of the 34th Regiment of the U.S. 24th Infantry Division, was killed while operating a 2.36-inch rocket launcher to prevent North Korean tanks from advancing. Additionally, ordnance authorities received numerous combat reports regarding the failure of the M6A3 warhead to properly detonate upon impact, eventually traced to inventories of rocket ammunition that had deteriorated from numerous years of storage in humid or salt air environments. Therefore, the U.S. Army immediately airlifted a small number of available M20 Super Bazookas from the U.S. mainland. The rockets were deployed during the Battle of Taejon on July 18, and proved their power by destroying a number of North Korean tanks that entered the city on July 20. As a result, the U.S. Army rushed to secure more M20 rockets and was able to hold more than 900 Super Bazookas during the Battle of Pusan Perimeter. The South Korean military also began receiving the M20 in early August, and successfully destroyed four tanks with M20s during their first usage on August 9.

Large numbers of 2.36-inch bazookas that were captured during the Chinese Civil War were employed by the Chinese forces against the American Sherman and Patton tanks, and the Chinese later reverse engineered and produced a copy of the M20 designated the Type 51. It is considered that the Communist-used bazookas destroyed more tanks than the UN bazookas did.

==== Vietnam War ====
The M20 was used in the early stages of the war in Vietnam by the U.S. Marines before gradually being phased out by the mid-1960s in favor of the M67 recoilless rifle and later, the M72 LAW rocket. The U.S. Army also used it in lesser quantity. While occasions to destroy enemy armored vehicles proved exceedingly rare, it was employed against enemy fortifications and emplacements with success. The M20 remained in service with South Vietnamese and indigenous forces until the late 1960s.

The Vietnam People's Army also developed their own bazooka under the management of Tran Dai Nghia. It was successfully test-fired in 1947. The anti-French Viet Minh received Chinese Type 51 bazookas. They were used by the Viet Cong as late as 1964.

==== Other conflicts ====
The Portuguese Armed Forces used quantities of M9A1 and M20 rocket launchers in their overseas provinces in Africa against Marxist guerrilla forces during the Portuguese Overseas War. The French Army also used the M9A1 and M20A1 launchers in various campaigns in Indochina, Korea, and Algeria. The M20A1 was replaced in the 1970s by the LRAC F1. Commonwealth armies also used the M20 and M20A1 under the name M20 Mk I and M20 Mk II. They were used until their replacement by the Carl Gustav L14A1. For instance, British Army used Super Bazookas during the Operation Vantage. The Argentine Army fielded M20s during the Falklands War.

== Variants ==
=== Rocket launcher, M1 "Bazooka" ===
- First issued June 14, 1942; designed by Capt. L.A. Skinner
- Used the M6 HEAT and M7 training practice rockets (60 mm warhead)
- Can penetrate up to 3 inches (76 mm) of armor
- Velocity of 265 ft/s (81 m/s; 181 mph)
- Overall length: 54 in (1.4 m).
- Weight (unloaded): 18 lb (8.2 kg).

=== Rocket launcher, M1A1 "Bazooka" ===
- Improved electrical system
- Simplified design
- Used the M6A1 HEAT and M7A1 practice rockets. Could use the improved M6A3 HEAT, M7A3 practice, and M10 bursting smoke (white phosphorus) rockets.
- Forward hand grip removed
- Contact box removed
- Supplanted the M1 in production beginning in July 1943
- Overall length: 54.5 inches (1,380 mm)
- Weight (unloaded): 13.26 pounds (6.01 kg)

=== Rocket launcher, M9 "Bazooka" ===
- Battery ignition replaced by trigger magneto
- Could be disassembled into two halves for easier carrying
- Metal instead of wooden furniture
- Uses the improved M6A3 HEAT, M7A3 practice, and M10 bursting smoke (white phosphorus) rockets (weight: 3.4 lbs., velocity: 265 feet per second)
- M6A3 rocket had a blunt, rounded nose rather than the pointed nose of earlier rockets, which had been found to deflect off sloped tank armor, and also had a short cylindrical fixed tailfin which was less prone to bending during transport or rough handling. Could penetrate up to 4 inches (102 mm) of armor
- Supplanted the M1A1 in production beginning in October 1943
- Overall length: 61 inches (1,500 mm) fixed / 31.5 inches (800 mm) disassembled
- Weight (unloaded): 15.14 pounds (6.87 kg)

=== Rocket launcher, M9A1 "Bazooka" ===
An optical reflector sight replaced the iron sights beginning in September 1944. The M9A1 supplanted the M9 in production beginning in June 1944. It has an improved coupling mechanism for the launch tube; the overall length is 61.1 in (1.55 m) and 31.5 in (800 mm) when folded. Unloaded weight is 15.87 lb (7.20 kg).

=== Rocket launcher, M18 "Bazooka" ===
- Experimental version of the M9A1 made from aluminum alloy
- Ordered in late summer 1945, canceled at war's end
- Weight (unloaded): 10.5 pounds (4.8 kg)

=== Rocket launcher, M20 "Super Bazooka" ===
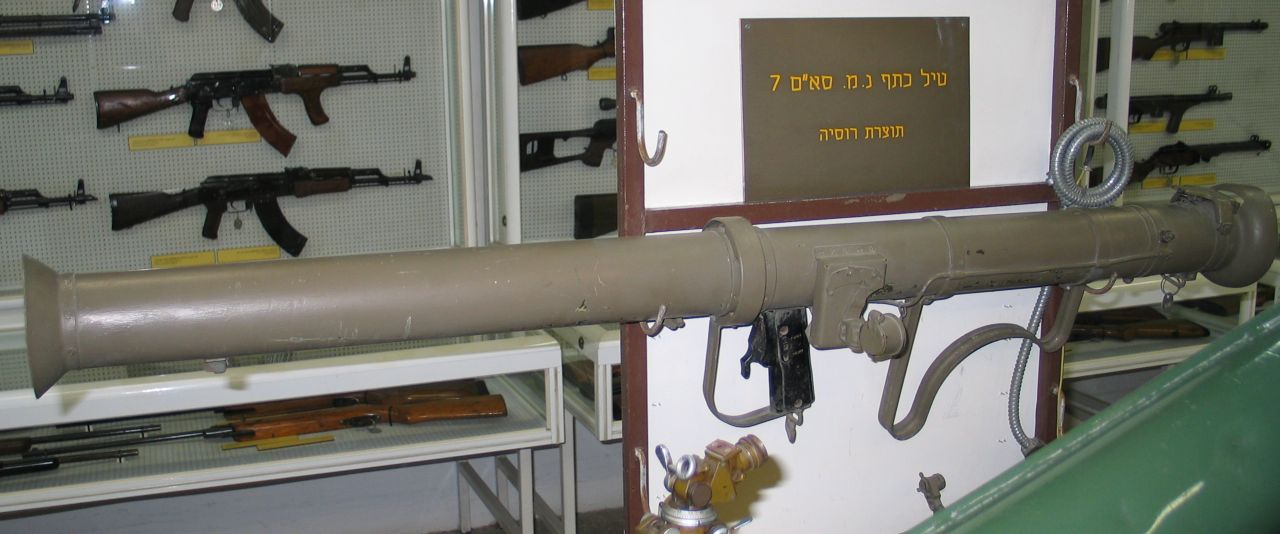
Super Bazooka (mislabeled "SAM-7 shoulder-launched anti-aircraft missile, Russian made") in Batey ha-Osef Museum, Tel-Aviv, Israel

- Larger, 3.5 in (88.9 mm) caliber, and larger warhead
- Could penetrate up to 11 inches (280 mm) of armor
- Extended range by about 150 m
- Originally a larger version of the M9A1, designated M20 in late 1944
- Entered active service just before the start of the Korean War

=== Rocket launcher, M20A1 "Super Bazooka" ===
- Product improved variant with improved connector latch assembly, entering production in 1952
- Improved version of the M20

=== Rocket launcher, M20B1 "Super Bazooka" ===
- Lightweight version with barrels made of cast aluminum, other components simplified
- Used as a supplement to the M20

=== Rocket launcher, M20A1B1 "Super Bazooka" ===
- M20B1 upgraded with M20A1 improvements

=== Rocket launcher, M25 "Three-shot Bazooka" ===
- Experimental tripod mounted rocket launcher with overhead magazine circa 1955

=== RL-83 Blindicide ===
- RL-83 Blindicide: An improved "bazooka" design of Belgian origin. Used by Belgian forces during the Congo Crisis and by the Swiss, Mexican and Israeli armies and various other armed forces.
- The Blindicide is not a direct derivative of the M20 design, being smaller caliber (83 mm not 88.9 mm). The aluminum launch tube is externally reinforced with glass reinforced plastic.
- The launch tube can be folded to just over half the opened length which makes it far easier to carry into combat
- The Blindicide rocket has another major difference from the "super bazooka" in that it is mechanically fired with a percussion cap system, the launcher having a simple mechanical hammer with a firing pin, that is cocked by the loader. There are two safety levers, one on the aimer's pistol grip, and another at the rear of the launch tube for the protection of the loader.
- Because no electrical connection had to be made between rocket and launcher, reload time is faster than for the "super bazooka" and a good team can fire off six rockets per minute.
- Blindicide rockets were designed to spin in flight, with six of the rocket's exhaust ports being angled to impart spin. While spinning the rocket has improved accuracy, centrifugal forces acting on the explosive jet tend to spread the jet, reducing the thickness of armor that it can penetrate.

=== 3.5 in Hydroar M20A1B1 rocket launcher ===
- Brazil, manufactured by Hydroar SA—improved 3.5 M20A1B1. A hand grip with solid state firing circuit powered by two AA cells replaced the U.S.-designed hand grip with magneto trigger.

=== 88.9 mm Instalaza M65 ===
- Developed by Instalaza for use by the Spanish Army, the M65 is an improved version of the M20 "super bazooka". It uses an improved ignition method and new ammunition types. The available ammunitions used were the CHM65 (HEAT), MB66 (dual-purpose), and FIM66 (smoke) shells. Older versions were designated M53 and M58.

== Specifications ==
=== M1 ===
- Length: 54 in (137 cm)
- Caliber: 2.36 in (60 mm)
- Weight: 13 lb (5.9 kg)
- Warhead: M6 or M6A2 shaped charge (3.5 lb, 1.59 kg)
- Range
  - Maximum: 400 yards (370 m)
  - Effective: (claimed) 150 yards (140 m)
- Crew: 2, operator and loader

=== M1A1 ===
- Length: 54 in (137 cm)
- Caliber: 2.36 in (60 mm)
- Weight: 12.75 lb (5.8 kg)
- Warhead: M6A1 or M6A3 shaped charge (3.5 lb, 1.59 kg)
- Range
  - Maximum: 400 yards (370 m)
  - Effective: (claimed) 150 yards (140 m)
- Crew: 2, operator and loader

=== M9/M9A1 ===
- Length: 61 in (155 cm)
- Caliber: 2.36 in (60 mm)
- Weight: 14.3 lb (6.5 kg)
- Warhead: M6A3 shaped charge (3.5 lb, 1.59 kg)
- Range
  - Maximum: 400–500 yards (370–460 m)
  - Effective: (claimed) 120 yards (110 m)
- Crew: 2, operator and loader (M9 and M9A1)

=== M20A1/A1B1 ===
- Length (when assembled for firing): 60 in (1,524 mm)
- Caliber: 3.5 in (90 mm)
- Weight (unloaded): M20A1: 14.3 lb (6.5 kg); M20A1B1: 13 lb (5.9 kg)
- Warhead: M28A2 HEAT (9 lb) or T127E3/M30 WP (8.96 lb)
- Range
  - Maximum: 1000 yd (913 m)
  - Effective (stationary target/moving target): 300 yd (270 m) / 200 yd (180 m)
- Crew: 2, operator and loader

== Users ==
- Argentina: Super Bazooka. Used until at least the Falklands War, replaced by AT4.
- Australia: Super Bazooka.
- Austria: Super Bazooka.
- Belgium: RL-83.
- Bolivia: Super Bazooka.
- Brazil: Bazooka and Super Bazooka.
- Canada: Bazooka and Super Bazooka.
- Chile: Super Bazooka.
- Cuba: Super Bazooka. During the Bay of Pigs Invasion, the anti-Castrist Brigade 2506 used 2.36 in bazookas against Castro's T-34s.
- El Salvador: Super Bazooka.
- France: Bazooka and Super Bazooka.
- Greece: Super Bazooka.
- Guatemala: Super Bazooka.
- Guinea-Bissau: Super Bazooka.
- Indonesia: Super Bazooka.
- India: Super Bazooka.
- Iraq: Super Bazooka.
- Israel: M20A1.
- Provisional Irish Republican Army: M20 Super Bazooka, first used in 1971.
- Italy: M20A1 and RL-83 variants.
- Japan: JGSDF used Super Bazookas, replaced by the Carl Gustav recoilless rifles.
- Liberia: Super Bazooka.
- Luxembourg: Super Bazooka.
- Malaysia: Super Bazooka.
- Malawi: Super Bazooka.
- Mexico
- Morocco: M20 Super Bazooka.
- Myanmar: M9A1 and M20 Super Bazooka.
- Nazi Germany: Used captured M1s as 6 cm Raketenpanzerbüchse 788 (a)
- Netherlands: The M9A1 was used for a short period of time by the Dutch Army as the Raketwerper 2.36 inch. It served from the beginning of the 1950s to the end of the 1960s with the Landmacht as an instructional weapon, with the Troepenmacht in Suriname (TRIS, troop force in Surinam, part of the Landmacht), and the Nederlands Detachement Verenigde Naties (N.D.V.N.), Dutch Detachment United Nations in 1950–1951 during the Korean War. During the Korean War, the 2.36-inch bazooka was replaced by the 3.5-inch M20. Although it replaced the M9A1 in 1951 with the N.D.V.N., the weapon was not introduced into the Landmacht until 1954. The M20 and M20B1 were later replaced by the 66 mm LAW in 1968, but the bazooka remained in inventory for reservists, mobilisation, and other non-priority uses until 1989.
- Nigeria: M20 Super Bazooka.
- Norway: Super Bazooka.
- Pakistan: Super Bazooka.
- Paraguay
- People's Republic of China: Large numbers of 2.36-inch and 3.5-inch Bazookas were captured by the Chinese communists during the Chinese Civil War and Korean War. China also copied the 3.5-inch as the Type 51—with a projectile 90 mm in diameter. The Type 51 can fire captured 3.5-inch projectiles (i.e. 90 mm), but 3.5-inch Super Bazookas cannot load projectiles made for the Type 51.
- Philippines: Super Bazooka.
- Portugal: Super Bazooka.
- Republic of China: Super Bazooka.
- Rhodesia: Super Bazooka.
- Sierra Leone: Super Bazooka.
- South Africa: Super Bazooka.
- South Korea: The armed forces received 1,958 M9A1s before the Korean War, and 609 M9A1s and 4,907 M20s were in service by the end of the war.
- South Vietnam: M9A1 and M20A1 variants.
- Soviet Union: Bazooka.
- Spain: M20 Bazooka and improved designs (M53, M58 and M65).
- Sweden: Super bazooka.
- Thailand: Super Bazooka as คจตถ. 3.5 นิ้ว in the Royal Thai Army, replaced by the Type 69 RPG.
- Tunisia: Super Bazooka.
- Turkey: Super Bazooka.
- United Kingdom: Bazooka and Super Bazooka. Domestically manufactured versions of the Super Bazooka and its ammunition were issued alongside the American originals. Replaced by the Carl Gustav M2 (L14A1) during the 1960s.
- United States: Bazooka replaced by the M72 LAW.
- Vietnam: Type 51 Bazooka, used by Viet Minh and Viet Cong.
- West Germany: Super Bazooka.
- Yugoslavia: M20 and M20A1B1

== See also ==
- List of U.S. Army weapons by supply catalog designation (Group B)
- PIAT (Contemporary British anti-tank weapon)

== Sources ==
- Dunlap, Roy F. (1948), Ordnance Went Up Front, Samworth Press.
- Green, Michael; Green, Gladys (2000), Weapons of Patton's Armies, Zenith Imprint Press, ISBN 978-0-7603-0821-9
- Hoffman, Jon T., ed. (2011). A History of Innovation: U.S. Army Adaptation in War and Peace. Military Bookshop. ISBN 978-1-7803-9289-9.
- Jane's Infantry Weapons 1995–1996, Jane's
- Kleber, Brooks E; Birdsell, Dale (December 12, 2001) [1966], "XIV. The Flame Thrower in the Pacific: Guadalcanal to the Marshall Islands", The Chemical Warfare Service: Chemicals in Combat (online ed.), Washington, D.C.: Office of the Chief of Military History, Department of the Army
- Mayo, Lida (1968). The Ordnance Department: on Beachhead and Battlefront. Washington, D.C.: Office of the Chief of Military History, Department of the Army.
- Rottman, Gordon L. (2012). The Bazooka. Osprey Publishing. ISBN 978-1-8490-8801-5.
- Talens, Martien (1994). De ransel op de rug, deel 2 (in Dutch). Breda: Brabantia Nostra. ISBN 978-9-0694-9032-8.
- Wiener, Friedrich (1987). The armies of the NATO nations: Organization, concept of war, weapons and equipment. Truppendienst Handbooks. Vol. 3. Vienna: Herold Publishers.
- Zaloga, Steven J. (2016). Bazooka Vs Panzer: Battle of the Bulge 1944. Bloomsbury Publishing. ISBN 978-1-4728-1250-6.
- "How the Bazooka Team Stops Them". Popular Science. December 1943. Article on early M1 Bazooka with rare photos.
- "Anti-Tank Rocket M6 Bazooka".
- 90th Infantry Division Preservation Group. Page on Bazookas and equipment.
- "New GI Weapons". Popular Science. October 1950. pp. 98–99.
