= Leslie Skinner =

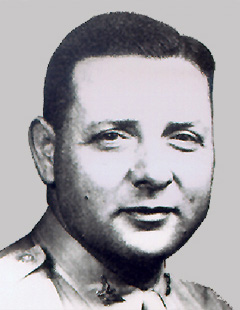
- Colonel Leslie A Skinner
- Born: April 21, 1900; San Francisco, California
- Died: November 2, 1978 (aged 78); Clearwater, Florida
- Burial place: Arlington National Cemetery
- Military career
- Allegiance: United States
- Branch: United States Army Air Corps
- Service years: 1941–1947
- Rank: Colonel
- Conflicts: World War II
- Awards: Legion of Merit

Colonel Leslie Alfred Skinner LOM (April 21, 1900 – November 2, 1978) was an American rocket engineer. He played a leading role in the development of several rocket propelled weapons during World War II, notably the first shoulder-fired missile system, the bazooka.

== Early life and education ==
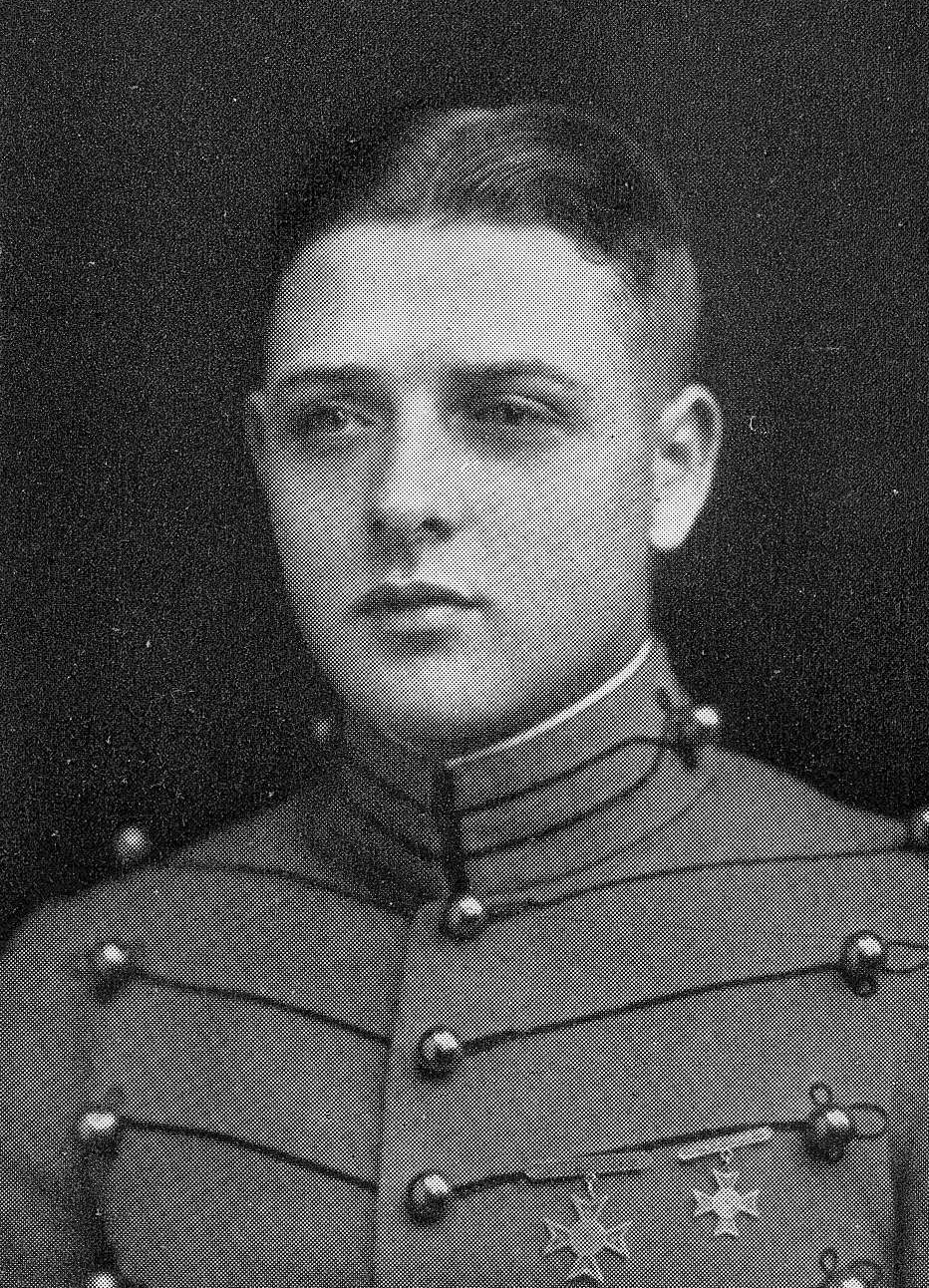
At West Point in 1924

Born in San Francisco, California in 1900, Skinner was the only son of an army surgeon. As a young teenager, he had a fascination with rockets and began to build his own, an activity that was forbidden after he had set fire to the hospital roof at Fort Strong, Massachusetts in 1915.

He graduated from Boston Latin School in 1918 and after wartime military service, began medical training at Harvard University before deciding to follow his childhood interest in weaponry by enrolling at West Point. He graduated in 1924. Commissioned into the Army Air Corps, he qualified as an airship pilot and air observer.

== Rocket development ==
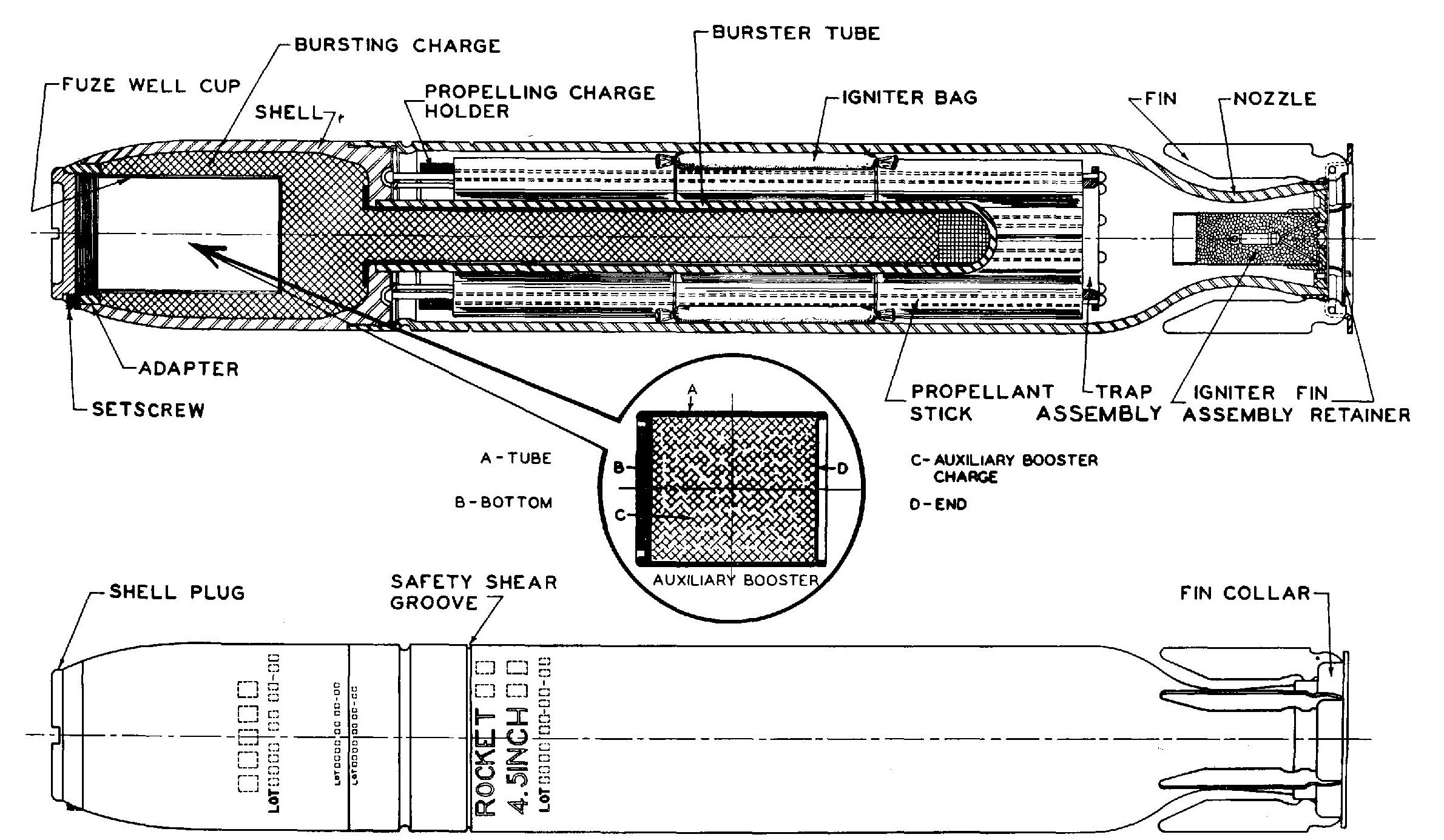
Diagram of the M8 rocket, designed by Skinner using an old fire extinguisher tank for the exterior casing

An attachment to the Aberdeen Proving Ground in 1932, gave him the chance to experiment with solid-propellant rockets, the only rocket research in the US Armed Forces at that time. After a spell at the Massachusetts Institute of Technology to complete a Master of Science degree, Skinner became an instructor at Aberdeen and continued his experiments in his spare time, often reusing discarded artillery propellants and scrap parts. There was little official interest in his work, and in 1938 he was posted to Hawaii for two years. In the meantime, the need for rocket weapons had been realised by the authorities and on his return, he was posted to the Indian Head Rocket Laboratory, Maryland, under the direction of Clarence N. Hickman.

Skinner originally produced sketches of a tube-launched anti-tank rocket in December 1940, but was told that there was no suitable warhead. The development of the M10 shaped charge projectile brought the project back to life, and while Skinner worked on the actual rocket, work on a launcher was delegated to Edward Uhl, who had recently joined Skinner's Special Projects Unit. The first prototype launcher was made from a steel tube salvaged from a scrap heap; it was demonstrated in May 1942 by Skinner and Uhl during a trial of spigot mortars at Aberdeen, the rocket launcher scoring several hits on a moving tank target while five different mortars achieved none; this was a considerable achievement since the launcher's sights had been fabricated that morning from a wire coat hanger. The first production Rocket Launcher, M1 "Bazooka" were issued in time for Operation Torch, the invasion of North Africa, in October 1942.

During development of the M8 rocket in the fall of 1941, Skinner produced the first prototypes which he tested at Aberdeen; he had improvised the rocket casings from old fire extinguisher tanks which were 4.5 inches (110 mm) across, thereby fixing the diameter of the developed weapon.

In 1943, Skinner was posted to the United Kingdom to liaise with his British counterparts. While in England, he helped to identify the first photographic reconnaissance images of the German V-2 ballistic missiles. On his return, he was posted to the California Institute of Technology to establish an ordnance sub-office, effectively ending his research activities.

== Later career and retirement ==
In July 1945, Skinner was sent to the Pacific Theater to organize ordnance supply, before retiring from the army in 1948 to take up a post at the Aerojet Engineering Corporation in Rancho Cordova, California. With the outbreak of the Korean War in 1950, Skinner was recalled and given a commission in the Air Force, where he established a weapons test facility at Eglin Air Force Base. Retiring from the military for a second time two years later, he became a consultant for the weapons manufacturing Oerlikon Group. In 1970, he moved to Belleair Bluffs, Florida and took up sculpture.

Leslie Skinner died on November 2, 1978. He and his wife Margaret had two children. He was buried at Arlington National Cemetery with full military honors.
