= M16 (rocket) =

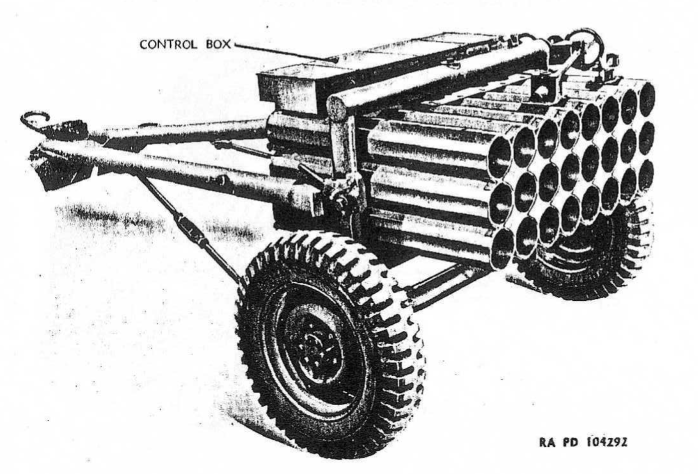
- The T66 launcher for the M16 rocket
- Type: Surface-to-surface rocket
- Place of origin: United States

Service history
- In service: 1945-1954
- Used by: United States Army, United States Navy

Specifications
- Mass: 42.5 lb (19.3 kg)
- Length: 31 in (790 mm)
- Diameter: 4.5 in (114 mm)
- Warhead: TNT
- Warhead weight: 4.3 lb (2.0 kg)
- Detonation mechanism: M81 Impact Fuze; M402 Proximity fuze (M16E1/M16E2)
- Engine: Solid-fuel rocket
- Propellant: Ballistite
- Operational range: 3.1 mi (5 km)
- Maximum speed: 890 ft/s (270 m/s)

The M16 was a 4.5-inch (114 mm) spin-stabilized unguided rocket developed by the United States Army during the Second World War. Entering service in April 1945 to replace the earlier fin-stabilised 4.5-inch M8 rocket, it was used late in the war and also during the Korean War before being removed from service.

== Development ==
Developed during the latter stages of the Second World War, the M16 was the first spin-stabilized 4.5-inch (114 mm) rocket to be standardized for production by the United States Army. 31 inches (790 mm) in length, it could hit targets as far as 5,200 yd (4,800 m) from its launcher. The M16 was launched from T66 "Honeycomb" 3x8 24-tube launchers, M21 5x5 25-tube launchers, and could also be fired from 60-tube "Hornet's Nest" launchers. The United States Marine Corps developed launching systems for the M16 rocket as well, capable of being fitted to standard 3/4 and 2.5-ton trucks. A version of the M16 rocket for single launchers, the M20, was developed as a derivative; practice rounds designated M17 and M21 were also manufactured.

During the Cold War years, various state and privately owned scientific institutions were engaged in the research and development projects, concerning development and enhancement of the U.S. Army spin-stabilized rockets, to mention California Institute of Technology, North Carolina State College of Agriculture of the University of North Carolina.

== Operational history ==
A unit of "Honeycombs" was deployed to the European Theater of Operations in May 1945, and saw limited action in Czechoslovakia before the end of the war; only being used in a single engagement. Two of five battalions equipped with the M16 were deployed to the Pacific Theater of Operations, being stationed on Okinawa and in the Philippines, however the war ended before these units could see combat. The M16 remained in service with the U.S. Marine Corps following the war, with a single 18-launcher battery equipping each Marine Division; these saw combat service during the Korean War, as did U.S. Army launchers, the M16 fired from the T66 launcher being considered one of the "principal artillery weapons in the Korean War inventory".

== Variants ==
M16 (T38E3)
Baseline version adopted by U.S. Army
M16E1
M16 rocket with deeper fuze cavity for V.T. Fuze M402 (Mk 173).
M16E2
M16E1 with purge pellets of 411E to eliminate chunks in burning
M17
Practice round for M16 rocket.
M20
M16 variant with ignition wires attached to spools instead of contact rings.
M21
Practice variant of M20 Rocket

== Photo Gallery ==
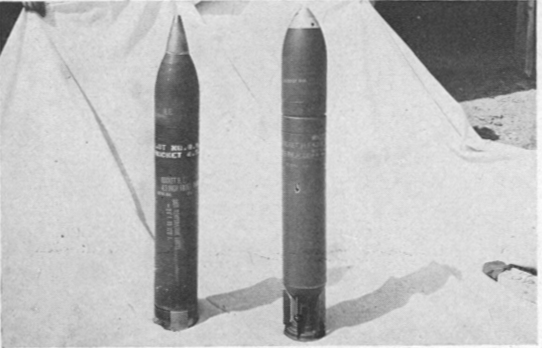
M16 and M8 rockets.

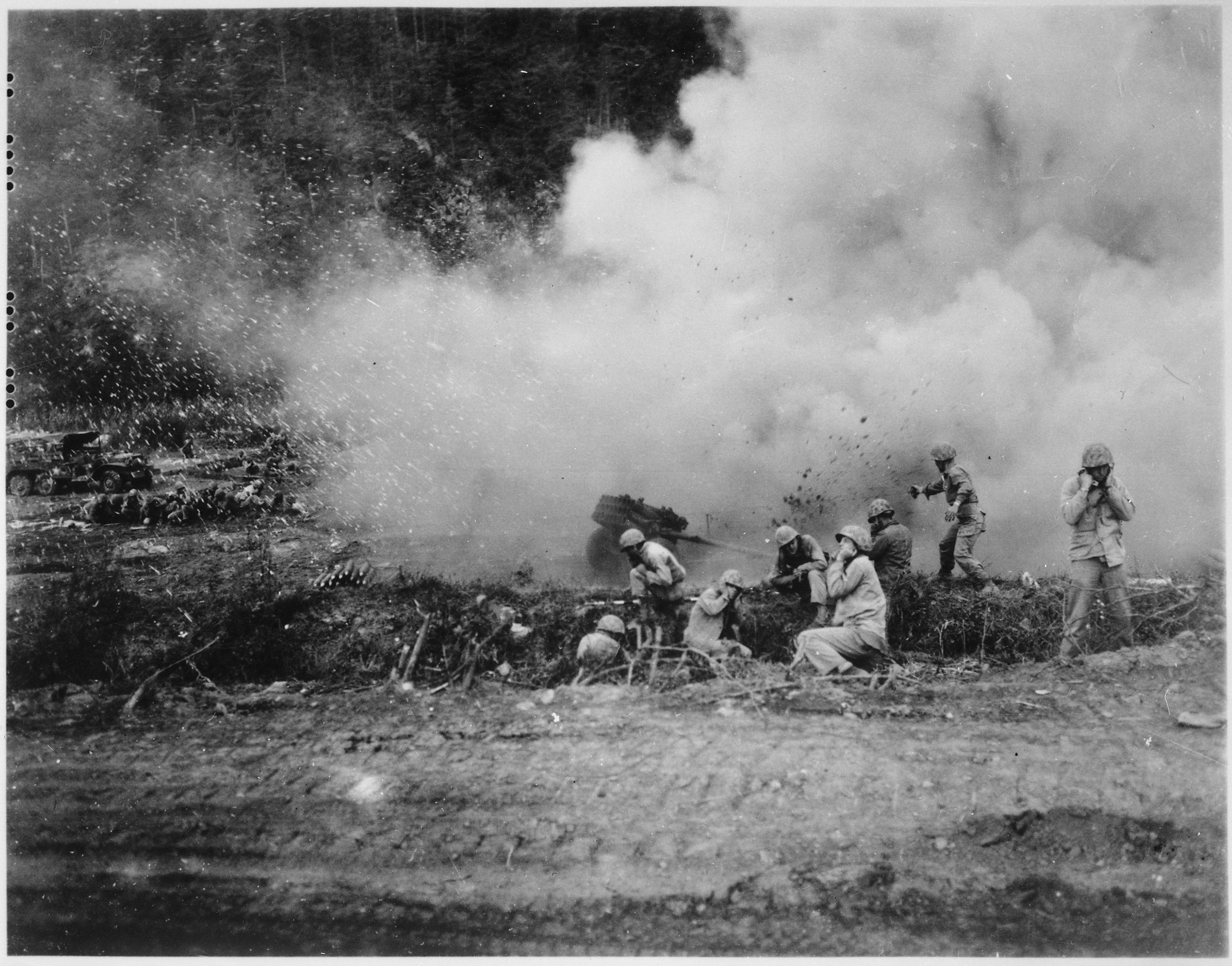
M16 24-tube launchers in Korea.

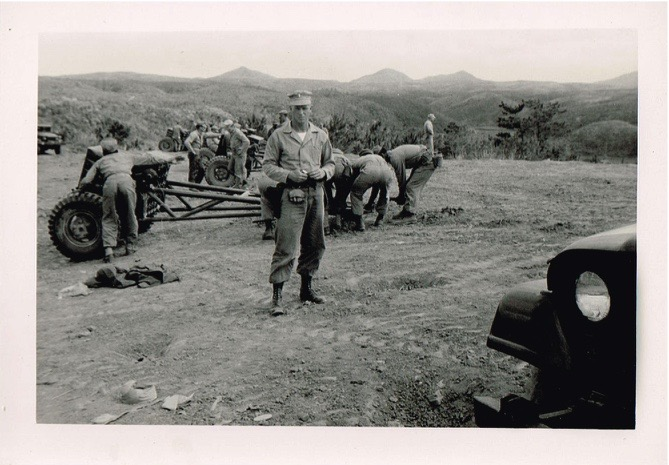
M21 25-tube launchers used by the USMC.

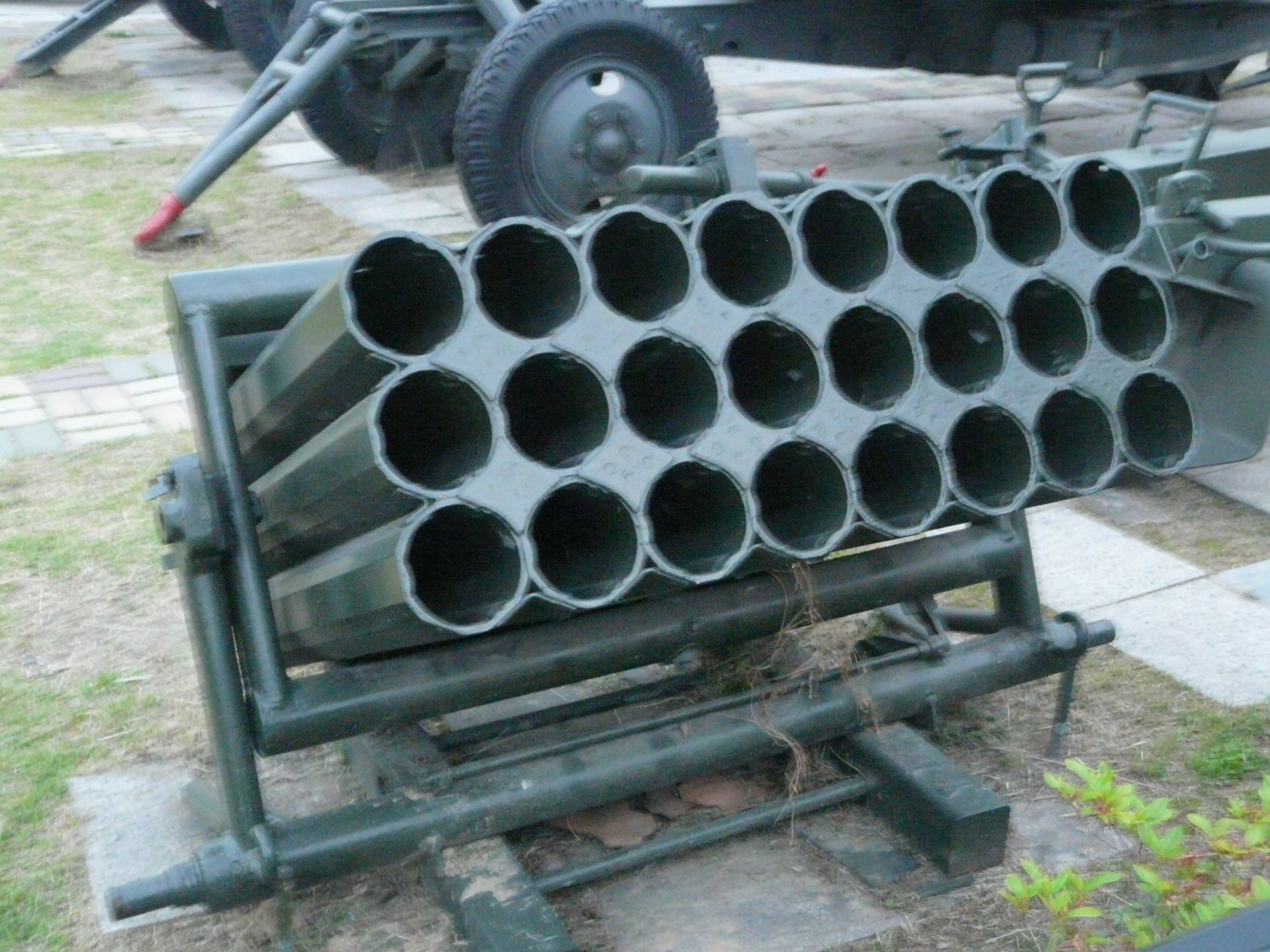
M16 launcher at the War memorial of Korea.

== Launchers ==
- T66 & T66E2 ("Honeycomb"): Towed, 24 tube. The E2 incorporated multiple improvements such as a new elevation system, blackout lighting, and sights. The 60-tube variant (designation needed), was nicknamed "Hornet's Nest".
- M21 (T123): Towed, 25 tube. Unusual in that it used square, rather than round, tubes.

== See also ==
- Katyusha rocket launcher
- List of U.S. Army rocket launchers by model number
- Multiple rocket launcher
- Nebelwerfer

== Bibliography ==
- Bishop, Chris, ed. (1998). The Encyclopedia of Weapons of World War II. New York: Orbis. ISBN 1-58663-762-2.
- Comparato, Frank (1965). Age of Great Guns: Cannon Kings and Cannoneers Who Forged the Firepower of Artillery. Mechanicsburg, PA: Stackpole Books. ASIN B001KJR32I.
- Parsch, Andreas (2006). "4.5-Inch Barrage Rockets". Directory of U.S. Military Rockets and Missiles Appendix 4: Undesignated Vehicles. Designation-Systems.net.
- Turner, David J. (29 March 1990). "MLRS": A Rocket System for the Marine Corps. Carlisle Barracks, PA: U.S. Army War College. AD-A223 182.
- Zaloga, Stephen (2007). US Field Artillery of World War II. New Vanguard. Vol. 131. New York: Osprey Publishing. ISBN 978-1-84603-061-1.
