= M8 (rocket) =

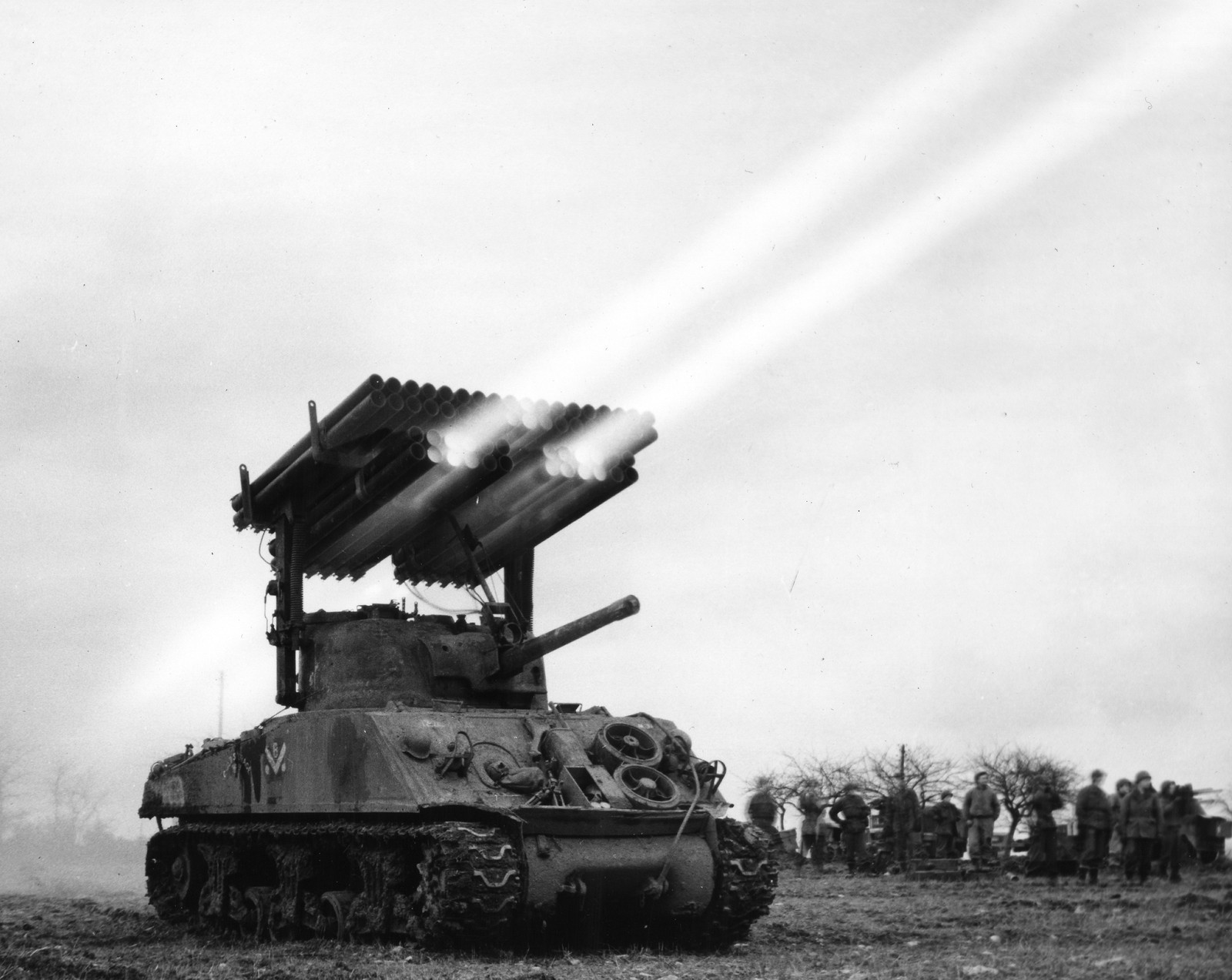
- M8 rockets being launched from a "Calliope" multiple launcher mounted on a Sherman tank.
- Type: Air-to-surface and surface-to-surface rocket
- Place of origin: United States

Service history
- Used by: United States Army, United States Navy

Production history
- Designer: Picatinny Arsenal
- Designed: 1941
- Manufacturer: Chrysler Corporation, Highland Park Plant (328,327); Hercules Powder Company Radford Ordnance Works and Sunflower Ordnance Works (solvent powder)
- Produced: 1941-1944
- No. built: 2,537,000

Specifications
- Mass: 38 lb (17 kg)
- Length: 33 in (840 mm)
- Diameter: 4.5 in (114 mm)
- Warhead weight: 4.3 lb (2.0 kg)
- Engine: Solid-fuel rocket 4.75 lb (2.15 kg) fuel
- Operational range: 4,600 yd (4.2 km)
- Maximum speed: 600 mph (970 km/h); 880 ft/s (270 m/s)
- Guidance system: None
- Launch platform: Republic P-47, Lockheed P-38G Lightning, M4 Sherman, LST

The M8 was a 4.5-inch (114 mm) rocket developed and used by the United States military during World War II. Produced in the millions, it was fired from both air- and ground-based launchers; it was replaced by the M16 rocket in 1945.

== Development ==
The first modern research into military solid-propellant rockets in the United States was conducted by Colonel Leslie Skinner at the Aberdeen Proving Ground in 1932. Little interest was shown by the US Armed Forces however, until the introduction of a British anti-aircraft rocket; both nations exchanged their research data before the United States entered World War II.

The M8 rocket was developed by the National Defense Research Committee and the Army Ordnance Department in the early 1940s at Picatinny Arsenal. The specifications were agreed in the summer of 1941 after examining equivalent British rockets. Skinner produced the first prototypes which were tested at Aberdeen that fall, improvised from old fire extinguisher tanks for rocket casings, thereby determining the 4.5 inch diameter. It was stabilized by base-hinged flip-out fins on the tail, a system patented by Edgar Brandt in 1930 (and also used on German R4M rocket), which proved less than satisfactory for ground-launched rockets as their initial low velocity and resulting low fin forces led to wandering in the first moments of flight. (Modern implementations of this system like the RPG-7 grenade launcher spin the projectile before leaving the tube to prevent similar wandering)

Original priority was given to an air-to-ground version. Confidence in the initial results was so high that the USAAF had ordered 3,500 rockets before any had been actually fitted to an aircraft and it was hoped to have them operational in time for Operation Torch, the invasion of North Africa, in October 1942. The successful launch of an M8 from a Curtiss P-40E fighter on 6 July 1942 resulted in a procurement order for 600,000 units. Development began on a reloadable launcher that could be fitted in the bomb bay of a Douglas A-20 bomber, but this never became operational. There were considerable problems with the propellant, the fuses and the underwing launching tubes, all of which considerably delayed operational deployment.

The initial production model was given the Army designation of M8; improvements resulted in the M8A3, with a more powerful rocket engine and enlarged fins, and the T22, which had improved reliability and modifications to make the rocket safer.

== Operational history ==
Entering service in 1943, the M8 family of rockets saw service with the United States Army, which classified the M8 as a "barrage rocket". The rocket was also widely used by the United States Army Air Forces. Over 2,500,000 of the M8 type rocket had been produced by the end of the war.

=== Ground role ===
Operational service showed some drawbacks in the M8's performance; ground launch resulted in the rockets' fin stabilizers proving ineffective, reducing the accuracy of the rocket; despite this, it was considered an effective barrage weapon. Due to the lack of accuracy, when ground-launched, it was being launched from large multiple launchers; the most commonly used being eight- and 60-tube launchers, called "xylophones" and "calliopes" respectively. The officially-named U.S. Army T34 Calliope launch system was mounted on top of a M4 Sherman tank; once fired, the launcher could be detached and discarded, allowing the tank to be used in conventional combat, while the "xylophone", officially the T27, was carried on a 2½-ton truck's cargo bed. A 120-round launcher, designated T44, and a 144-round T45 launcher were also developed; these were intended for use by the United States Navy, being mounted on DUKW amphibious vehicles and LST amphibious warfare vessels. Single- and twin-14-round launchers were also developed.

The M8 showed poor effectiveness against hardened targets; this resulted in the development of the Super M8, which had larger fins, a more powerful rocket and a more powerful warhead. The Super M8 underwent testing in late 1944, but failed to see combat. The M8 was replaced by the improved spin-stabilized M16 rocket during 1945.

=== Aircraft role ===
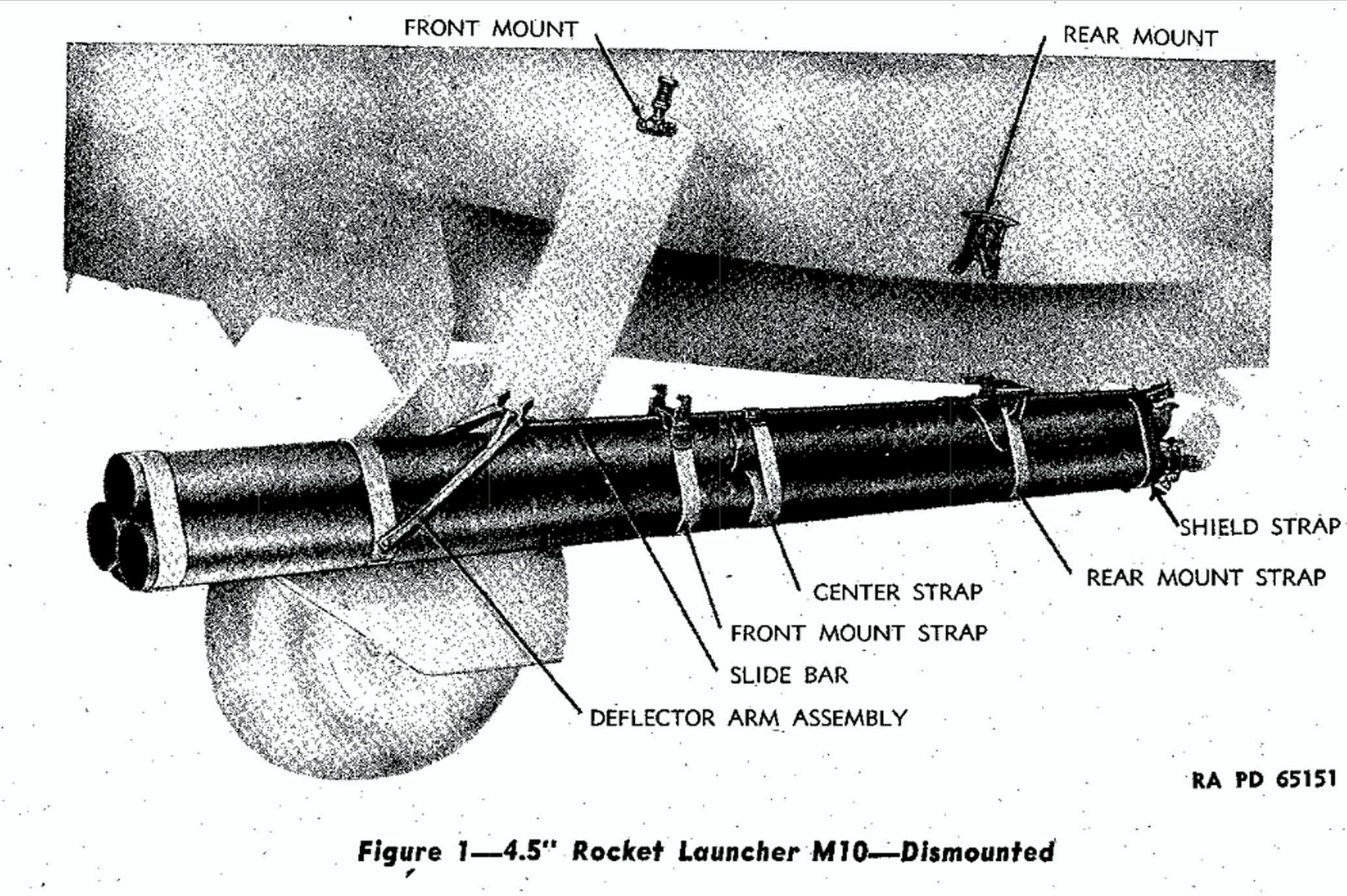
The M10 triple-tube rocket launcher for M8 rockets, shown for a P-47.

The method of launching the M8 from the wings of fighters were finally solved by the development of an M10 triple-tube launcher made of plastic or alloy. However, the modification required to adapt existing aircraft to carry these launchers was vastly more complicated than that required for the 5-inch High Velocity Aircraft Rocket (HVAR) or "Holy Moses" which had been developed by the US Navy and was better in some respects than the M8 in performance. The M8 was initially available in greater numbers than the HVAR, and was fitted to Lockheed P-38 Lightnings and Republic P-47 Thunderbolts of the USAAF in Italy, Northwest Europe, south-east Asia and Pacific theatres from the second half of 1944, before being gradually replaced by the HVAR. However, the air-launched rocket was never a popular weapon with US fighter-bomber squadrons in Europe.

== Characteristics ==
Comparison of 5-Inch and 4.5-Inch Rockets
	5" HVAR Rocket	4.5" M8 Type Rocket
Total weight	140 pounds (64 kg)	40 pounds
Maximum velocity	1,300 feet per second (400 m/s)	865 feet per second
Weight of high explosive	7.8 pounds	5.1 pounds (M8A3), 4.3 pounds (T22)
Maximum accurate range	1,000 yards	800 yards
Approximate penetration of Class A armor	1.75 inches	1 inch
Penetration of good reinforced concrete	3 feet	1 foot
Operating temperature range	0 to 120 °F (−18 to 49 °C)	—10 °F to 105 °F (M8A3), -20 °F to 120 °F (T22)
Weight of plane mounting installation	15 pounds (16 mounts)	196 pounds (6 rockets total, from 2 M10 triple-tube cluster launchers).

== Launchers ==
M10
3-round launcher for carriage by aircraft, such as the Lockheed P-38G Lightning and Republic P-47D Thunderbolt.
M12
single-shot launcher with two front and one rear leg. The launcher was 48 in (1.2 m) long and weighed 52 lb (24 kg). It was made of plastic and was disposable.
M12A1
similar to the M12.
M12E1
reusable single-shot launcher made of magnesium. The rear leg was adjustable.
T27
8 round launcher mounted on a 2.5 ton a truck chassis. There was no traversing mechanism but it was able to be elevated from -5° to +45°.
T27E1
8 round launcher capable of being broken down into multiple loads for transport.
T27E2
24 round launcher with three rows of eight tubes.
T28
24 round launcher with square steel rails instead of tubes.
T34
L60 round launcher better known as the Calliope. It was made of plywood and had two rows of eighteen rockets above and two double rows of six below. These were mounted on M4 tanks with traverse and elevation controlled by the turret. The launcher was expendable after two or three salvos.
T34E1
60 round launcher better known as the Calliope. It was made of plywood and had two rows of sixteen rockets above and two double rows of seven below. These were mounted on M4A1 tanks with traverse and elevation controlled by the turret. This arrangement of tubes was adopted to lessen dispersion.
T34E2
60 round launcher with square steel rails instead of tubes.
T44
120 round fixed launcher. No elevation or traverse. Mounted on DUKWs and LVTs.
T45
2x14 round launchers fitted to M24 tanks, LVTs, and trucks. There was no traversing mechanism but it was able to be elevated from -5° to +35°.

== Photo Gallery ==
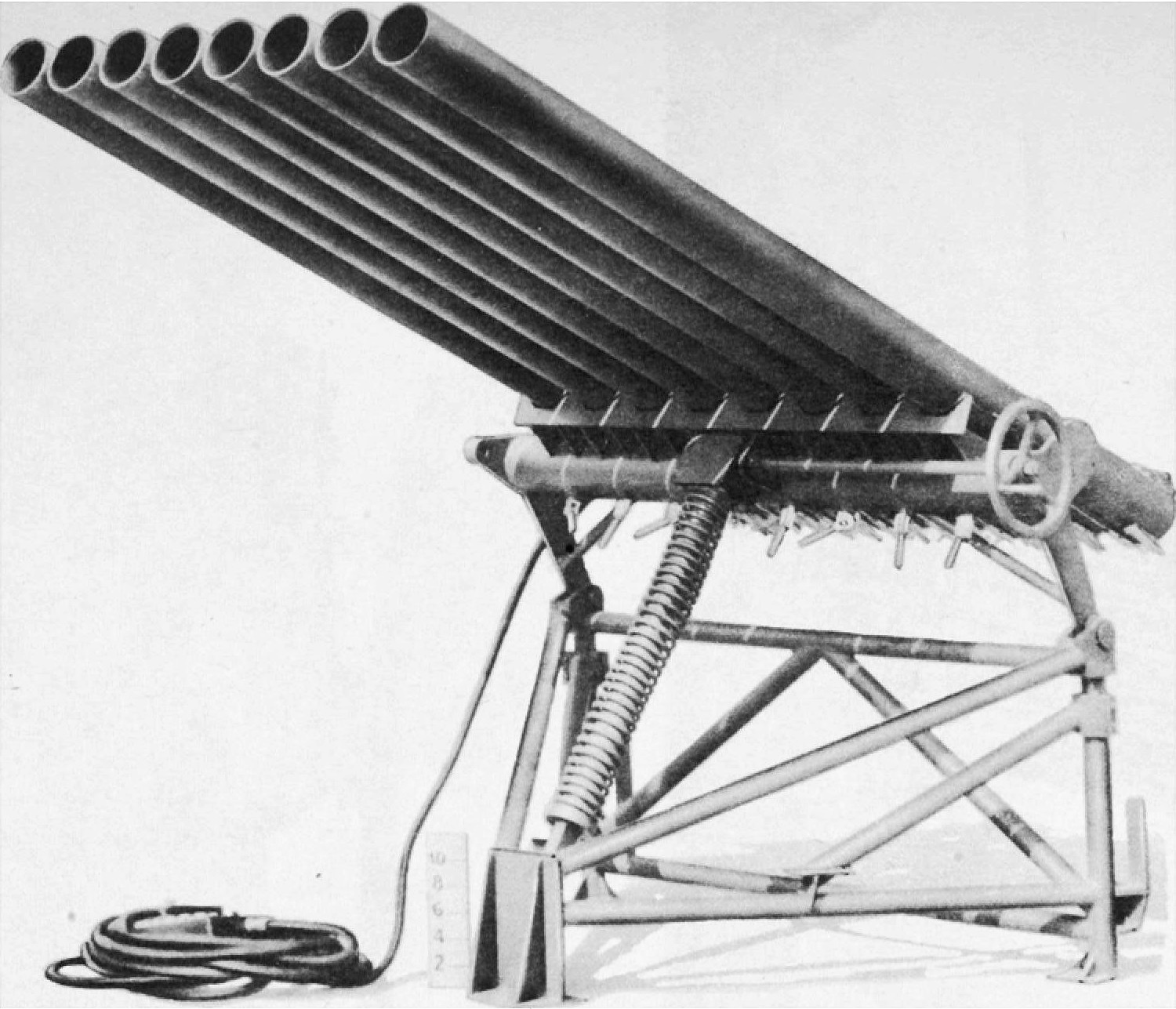
T27 launcher

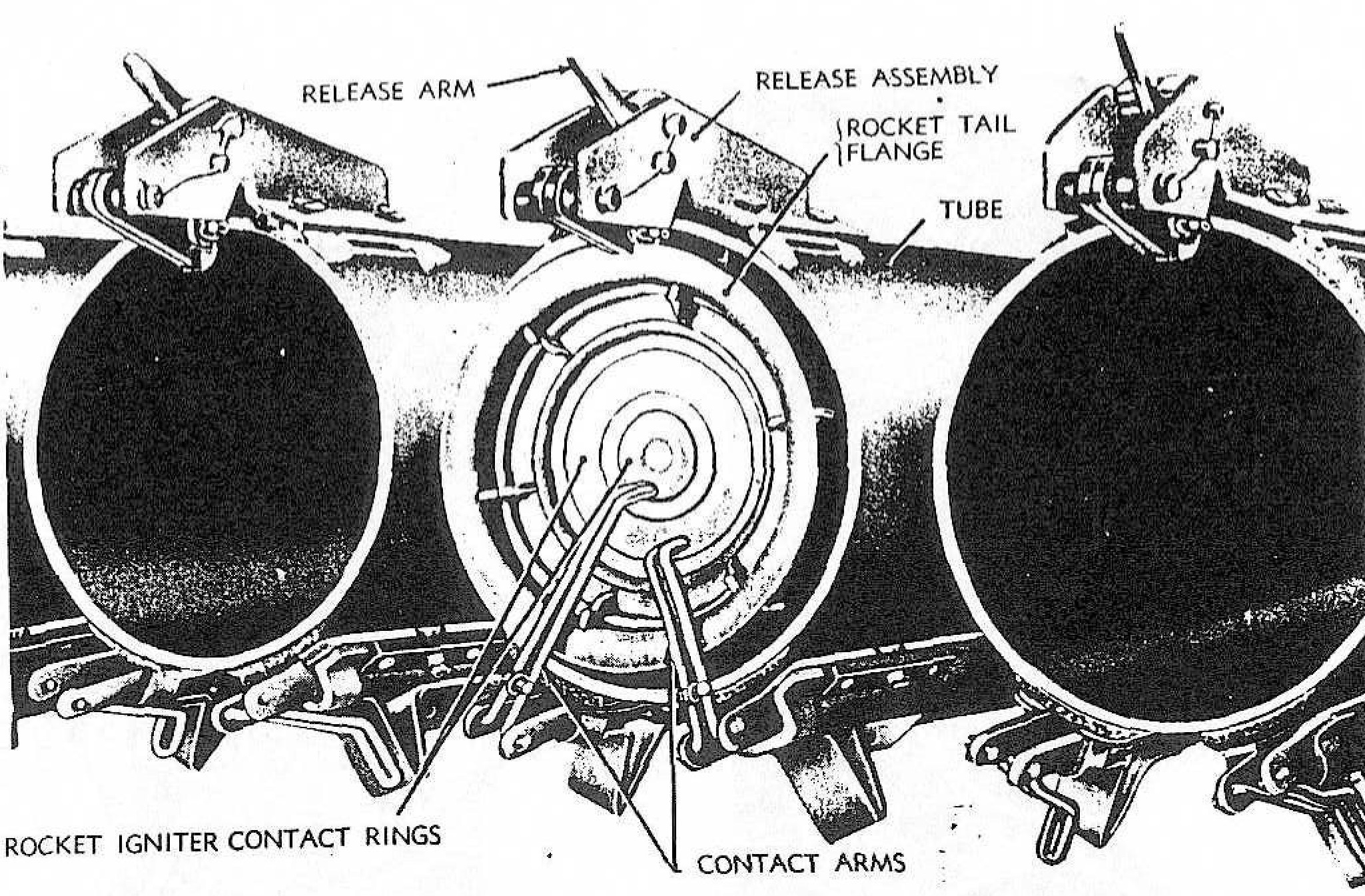
T27 launcher

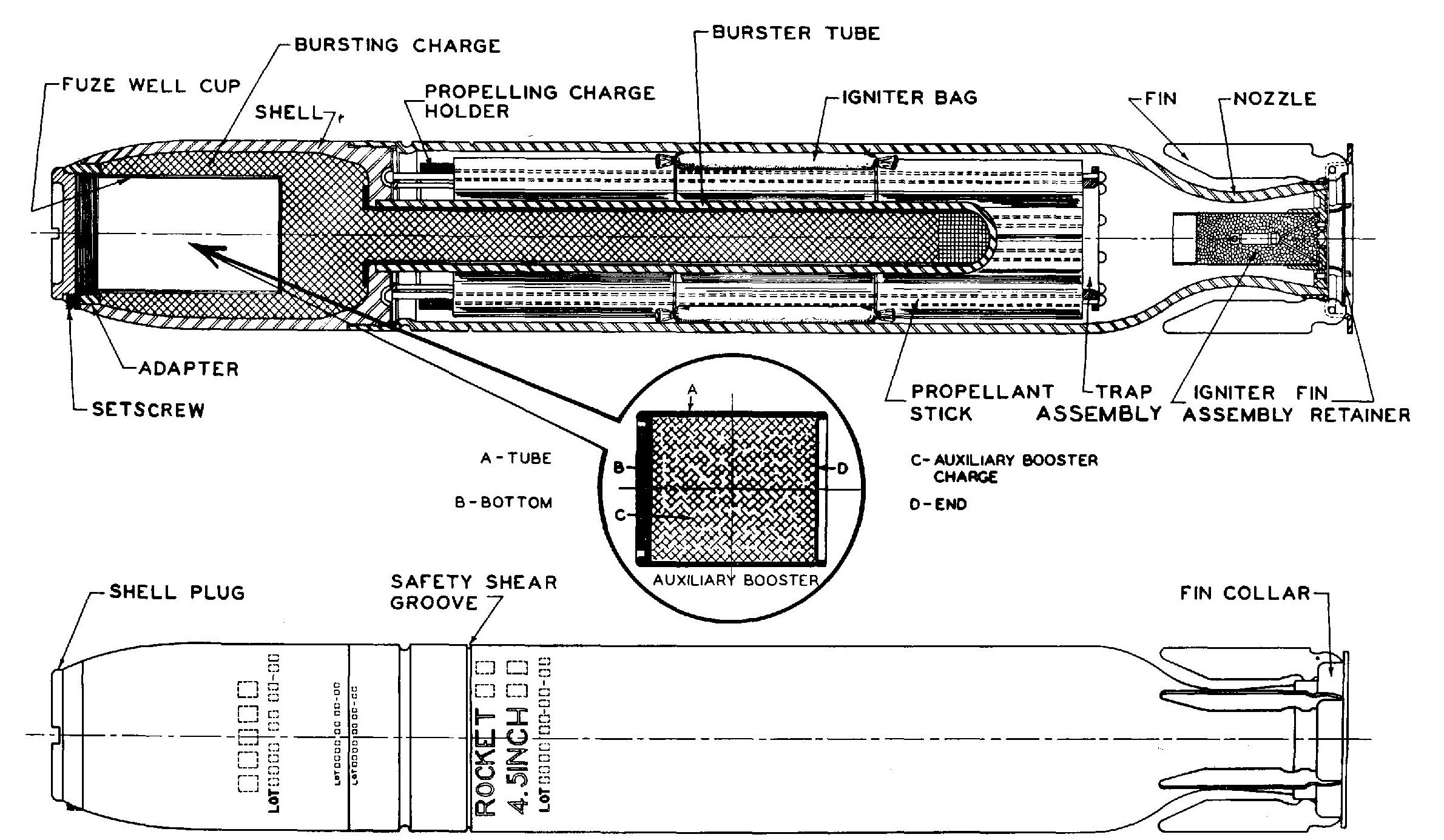
M8 rocket diagram

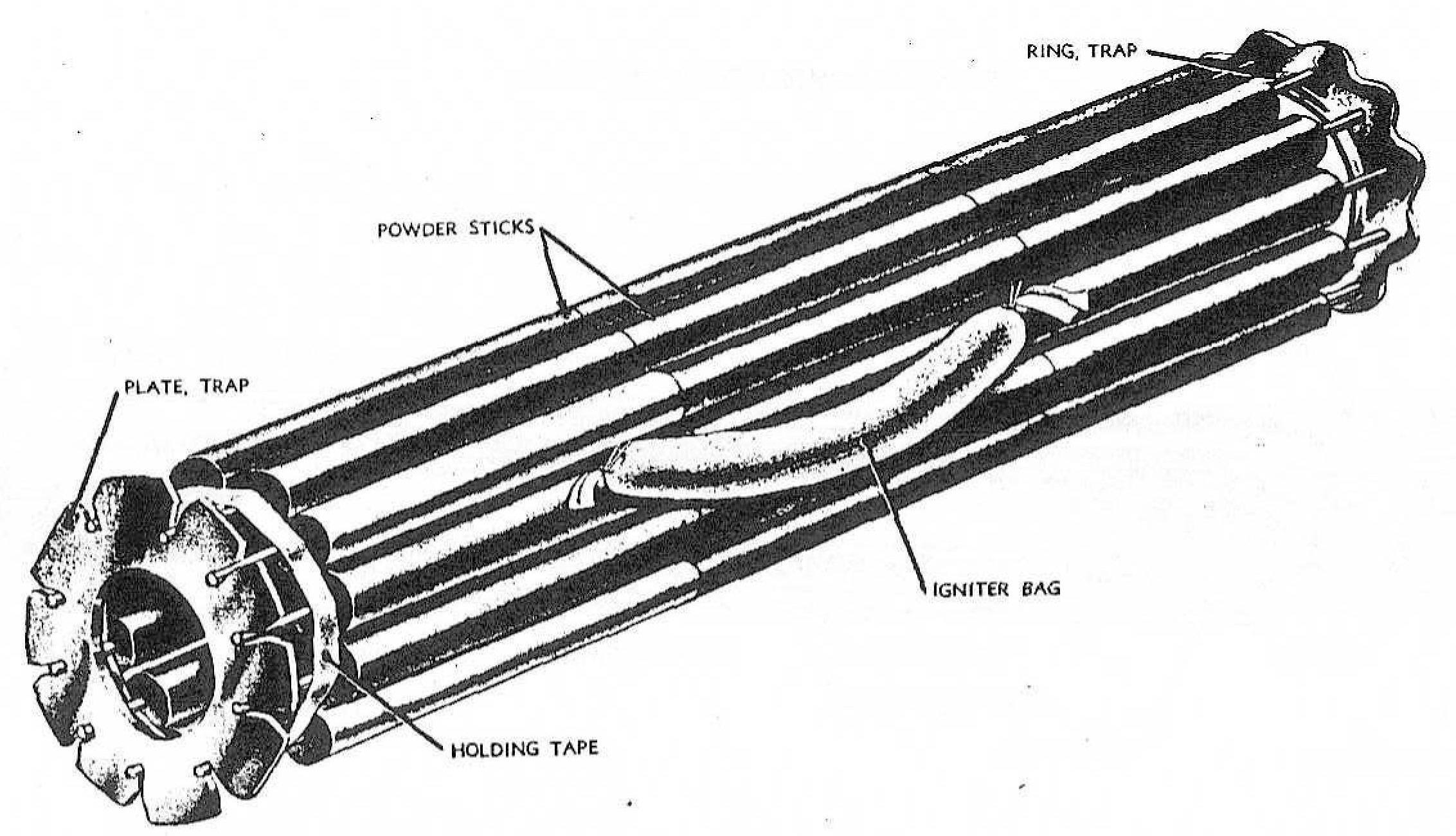
M8 rocket engine diagram

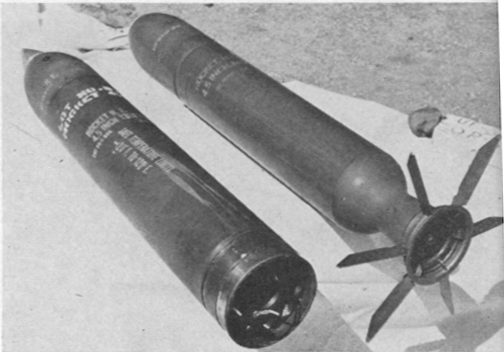
M16 and M8 rockets.

== See also ==
- Rocket artillery
- RP-3 - British air-launched rocket
- Land Mattress, British ground-launched rocket battery based on RP-3
- Katyusha rocket launcher, Soviet World War II rocket system, of which one version fired various types of 82mm (3.23 inch) calibre rockets, called "M-8"
