= Edward Uhl =

American inventor and soldier (1918–2010)

Edward G. Uhl
- Born: March 24, 1918; Elizabeth, New Jersey
- Died: May 9, 2010 (aged 92)
- Military career
- Allegiance: United States
- Branch: United States Army
- Service years: 1941–1947
- Rank: Lieutenant colonel
- Conflicts: World War II

Edward Uhl (March 24, 1918 – May 9, 2010) was a United States Army Ordnance Corps officer who developed the M1 portable rocket launcher, known as the bazooka.

He was born in New Jersey and graduated in engineering at Lehigh University, Bethlehem, Pennsylvania in 1940. He enlisted in the US Army in 1941 and was commissioned into the Ordnance Corps.

In 1942 while working at the headquarters of the corps in Washington with the rank of lieutenant he was tasked with utilizing the M1 shaped charge as an anti-tank weapon for use by the infantry. It was too heavy for a hand grenade so Uhl used a piece of scrap metal tubing to create a simple recoilless rocket launcher to propel the charge. According to Uhl,

I was walking by this scrap pile, and there was a tube that ... happened to be the same size as the grenade that we were turning into a rocket. I said, That's the answer! Put the tube on a soldier's shoulder with the rocket inside, and away it goes.

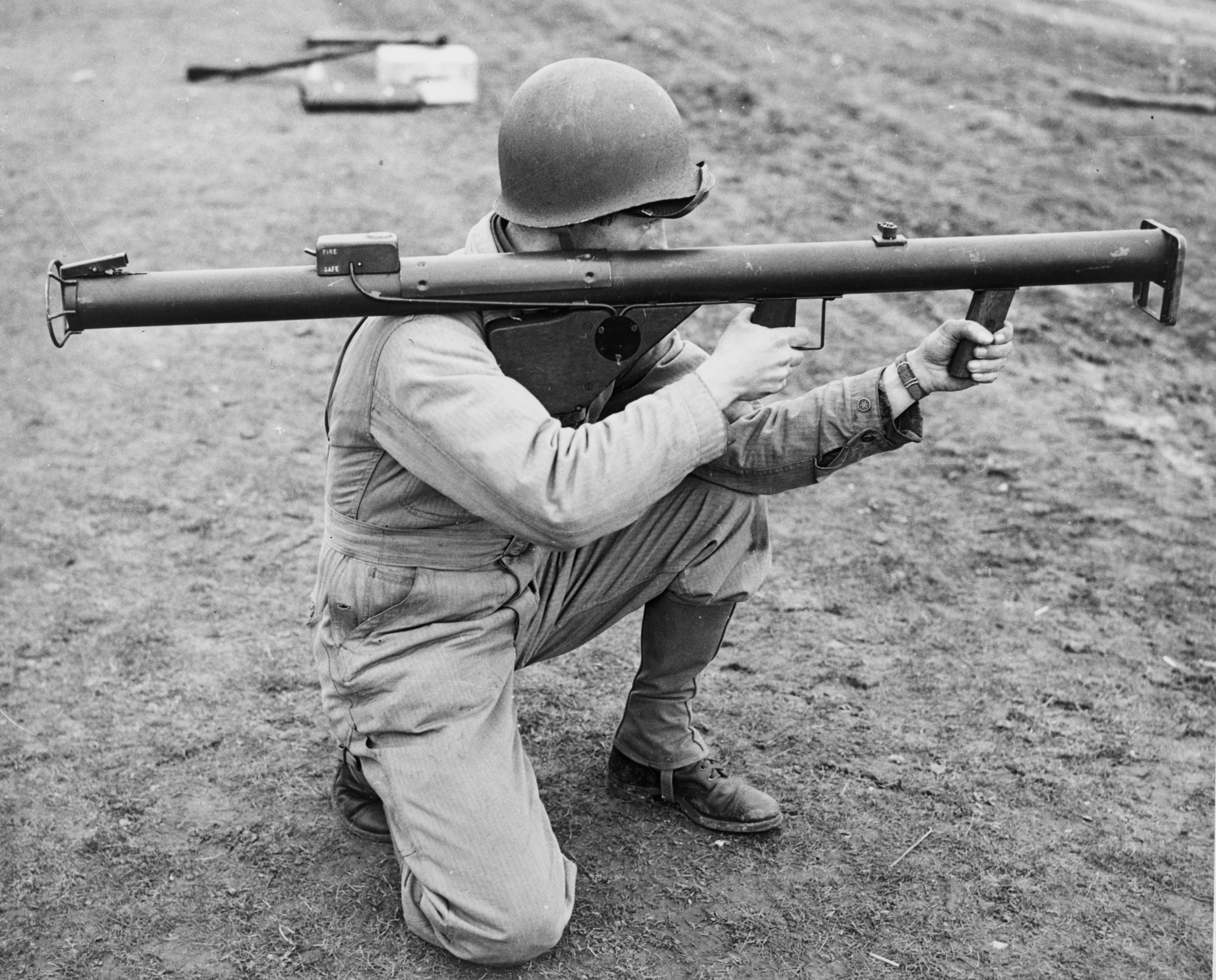
A soldier with the M1 Bazooka

By launching from the shoulder the danger of burns to the face of the operator was avoided. In 1942 the new weapon was deployed to North Africa and it was later used effectively against German tanks in the Normandy Campaign.

Uhl rose to the rank of lieutenant colonel and after his military service he worked for the Glenn L. Martin Company and Martin Marietta on guided missiles projects and became vice-president of engineering. He was then president of the Fairchild Engine and Airplane company before his retirement in 1985. He died aged 92 of heart failure.
