= Robert R. Martin =

American army officer (1902–1950)

- Born: 15 April 1902; Toledo, Ohio, United States
- Died: 8 July 1950 (aged 48); Cheonan, Korea
- Military career
- Allegiance: United States
- Branch: United States Army
- Rank: Colonel
- Commands: 34th Infantry Regiment
- Conflicts: World War II; Korean War
- Awards: Distinguished Service Cross; Silver Star; Bronze Star Medal (3); Purple Heart

Robert Reinhold Martin (15 April 1902 – 8 July 1950) was a United States Army officer who served in World War II and the Korean War.

== Early life ==
Martin was born in Toledo, Ohio, on 15 April 1902.

== Military career ==
During World War II, Martin served in the 44th Infantry Division. Following the outbreak of the Korean War, he was appointed as a commander of the 34th Infantry Regiment, 24th Infantry Division. In the Battle of Chonan (July 7–8, 1950), he and his regiment fought to the death to defend the Chonan. Martin and 128 other US soldiers were killed in action.

=== Distinguished Service Cross citation ===
On July 11, 1950, per General Orders No. 12, Martin was awarded the Distinguished Service Cross for his actions during the Korean War. His citation reads:

The President of the United States of America, under the provisions of the Act of Congress approved July 9, 1918, takes pride in presenting the Distinguished Service Cross (Posthumously) to Colonel (Infantry) Robert Reinhold Martin (ASN: 0-15953), United States Army, for extraordinary heroism in connection with military operations against an armed enemy of the United Nations while serving as Commanding Officer, 34th Infantry Regiment, 24th Infantry Division. Colonel Martin distinguished himself by extraordinary heroism in action against enemy aggressor forces at Chonan, Korea, on 8 July 1950. Observing enemy tanks and infantry in force penetrated his regiment's forward position, Colonel Martin, with total disregard for his own personal safety, rushed forward to organize and personally led rocket launcher and grenade attacks against the tanks and infantry at ranges of ten to twenty yards. Despite heavy small-arms and tank gun fire, Colonel Martin, by his heroic example, so inspired his men that they destroyed several tanks and forced others to withdraw, thereby preventing the enemy from immediately overrunning the position. During this action Colonel Martin lost his life while single-handedly attacking an enemy tank with a rocket launcher at a range of about fifteen yards.

== Awards and decorations ==
Martin's military awards include:

- Distinguished Service Cross
- Silver Star
- Bronze Star Medal with 2 Bronze Oak Leaf Clusters
- Purple Heart
- World War II Victory Medal
- National Defense Service Medal
- Korean Service Medal
- United Nations Service Medal
- Republic of Korea War Service Medal
- Republic of Korea Presidential Unit Citation
- Combat Infantryman Badge with Star (Second Award)

== Legacy and honors ==
In Cheonan, there is a memorial – "Martin Park" – and a commemoration ceremony is held every year.
