= Lawrence family =

Boston Brahmin family

Lawrence
- Coat of Arms of Henry Lawrence
- Origin: Wissett, England
- Founded: 1191 (Lancashire); 1635 (America)
- Founder: John Lawrence
- Connected families: Adams; Amory; Appelton; Bigelow; Cabot; Cunningham; Dana; Loring; Lowell; Peabody; Pierce; Prescott; Saltonstall

The Lawrence family (or Lawrance family) is a Boston Brahmin family, also known as the "first families" of Boston, who arrived in Watertown, Massachusetts from Wissett, England in 1635.

== History ==
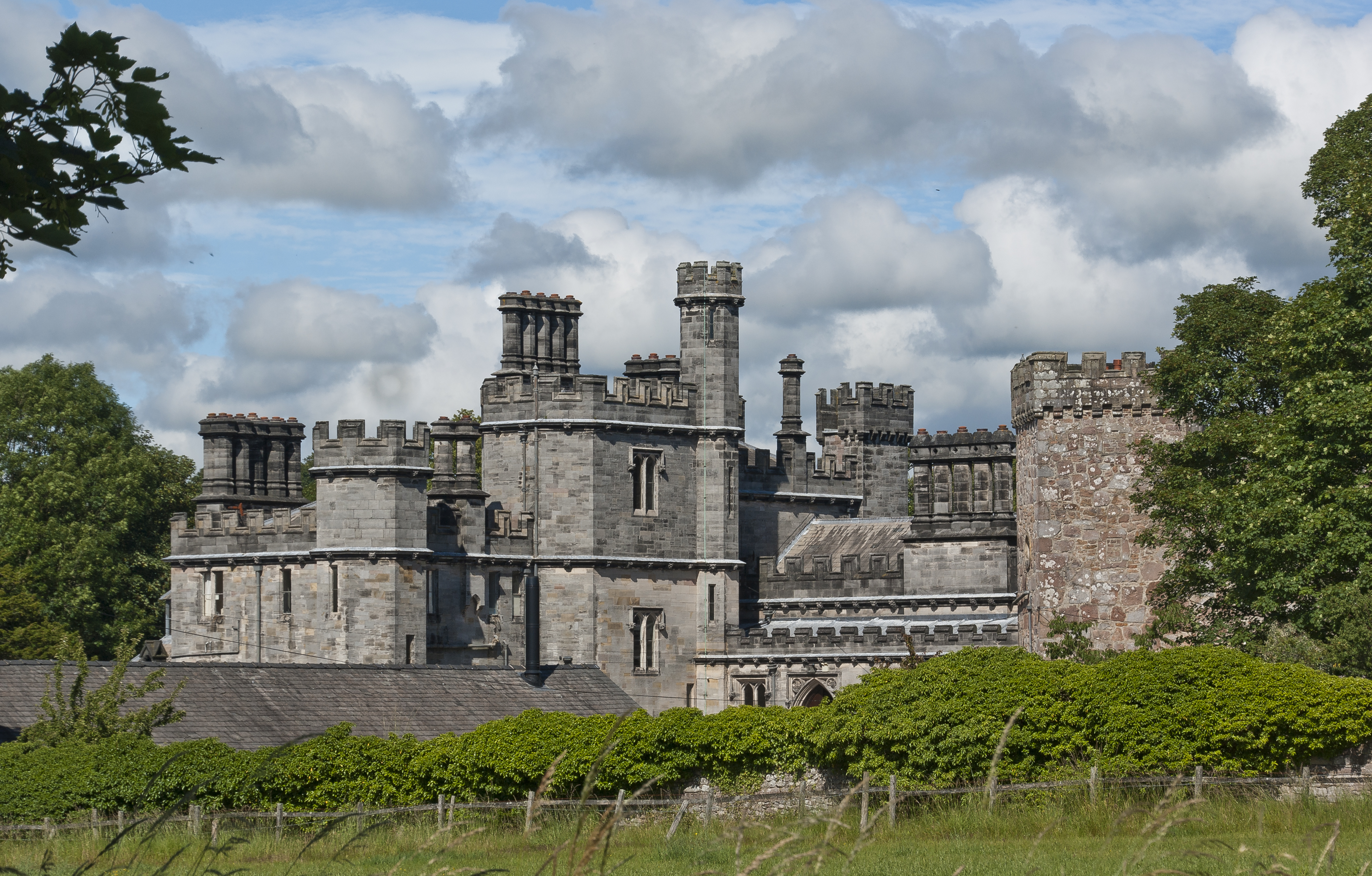
Ashton Hall, Seat of the Lawrence Family (Lancashire, England)

=== Family ===
The Boston Brahmin Lawrence family descended from John Lawrence (baptized October 8, 1609 at Wissett, Co. Suffolk, England) who emigrated to Watertown, Massachusetts in 1635. He married Elizabeth, with whom he had thirteen children. In 1662, John and Elizabeth changed their residence to Groton, Massachusetts. Elizabeth died in 1663, and John married (second) Susannah Batchelder.

The Lawrence family emigrated from Wissett, County Suffolk, England, where the family name can be traced back to Sir Robert Lawrence of Ashton Hall (Lancashire) in the year 1191 A.D. Sir Robert was knighted by King Richard "the Lionhearted" for gallant conduct at the Siege of Acre during the Third Crusade (A.D. 1191). From Sir Robert, the descent of John Lawrence of Wissett can be directly traced.

Among the families who first settled in Watertown, Massachusetts were those of Sir Richard Saltonstall and Reverend George Phillips, in all, a dozen or more, who came over in the Arbella – a ship which arrived at Salem in June 1630. Proceeding from Salem to Charlestown, they passed-up the Charles River about four miles, and began their settlement – the fourth in the colony. On the earliest list of proprietors is found "John Lawrence" (Wissett).

=== Rise to prominence ===
Ensign Nathaniel Lawrence, son of John Lawrence (baptized 1609) was born 1639 in Watertown, Massachusetts, and was a prominent member of the community, having received the commission as ensign of a company in Groton by Governor of Massachusetts Simon Bradstreet, and later, elected deacon. In 1692, he was elected as a representative from Groton to the "General Court of assembly begun at Boston." He married (first) Sarah Morse, daughter of Joseph Morse and Hannah Phillips, (second) Sarah, and (third) Sarah Smith.

==== Capt. Asa Lawrence ====
The youngest son of Deacon Peleg Lawrence (great-great grandson of John of Wissett) was born June 14, 1737 and married Abigail King on July 27, 1757 at Littleton, Massachusetts. As captain of one of the Groton companies of minutemen, he hastened his company to Cambridge when the Lexington alarm was sounded, and later fought at Bunker Hill. Capt. Asa Lawrence died January 16, 1804.

==== William Lawrence ====
William Lawrence was oldest child of Col. William Lawrence (great-grandson of Nathaniel, born 1639) was born in Groton May 7, 1723. He was the first one of the descendants of John of Wissett to enter Harvard College (admitted in July 1739 and graduated in 1743). He married Love Adams on February 7, 1750-51, a daughter of John Adams, who was a great-grandson of Henry Adams of Devonshire, England: who settled in Quincy, Massachusetts, and was the ancestor of the eminent branch of the Adams family of Massachusetts. William Lawrence became the first reverend of the church at Lincoln and continued in that office for thirty-one years. William Lawrence died April 11, 1780.

==== Maj. Samuel Lawrence ====
Samuel Lawrence third and youngest son of Captain Amos and Abigail (Abbott) Lawrence (great-great grandson of John of Wissett) was born in Groton on April 24, 1754. He was the patriarch of the Boston Brahmin Lawrence family. Maj. Lawrence served as a corporal in one of the Groton companies of minutemen. The first notice of the Battle of Lexington and Concord reached him at Groton while he was ploughing his field. His neighbor, General Oliver Prescott, rode up and shouted, "Samuel, notify your men. The British are coming!" He was one of the founders of Lawrence Academy (Groton, MA), the third oldest boarding school in Massachusetts. Maj. Lawrence also served as its trustee for twenty-seven years. Major Samuel Lawrence married Susannah Parker on July 22, 1777, and he died on November 8, 1827, in his seventy-fourth year.

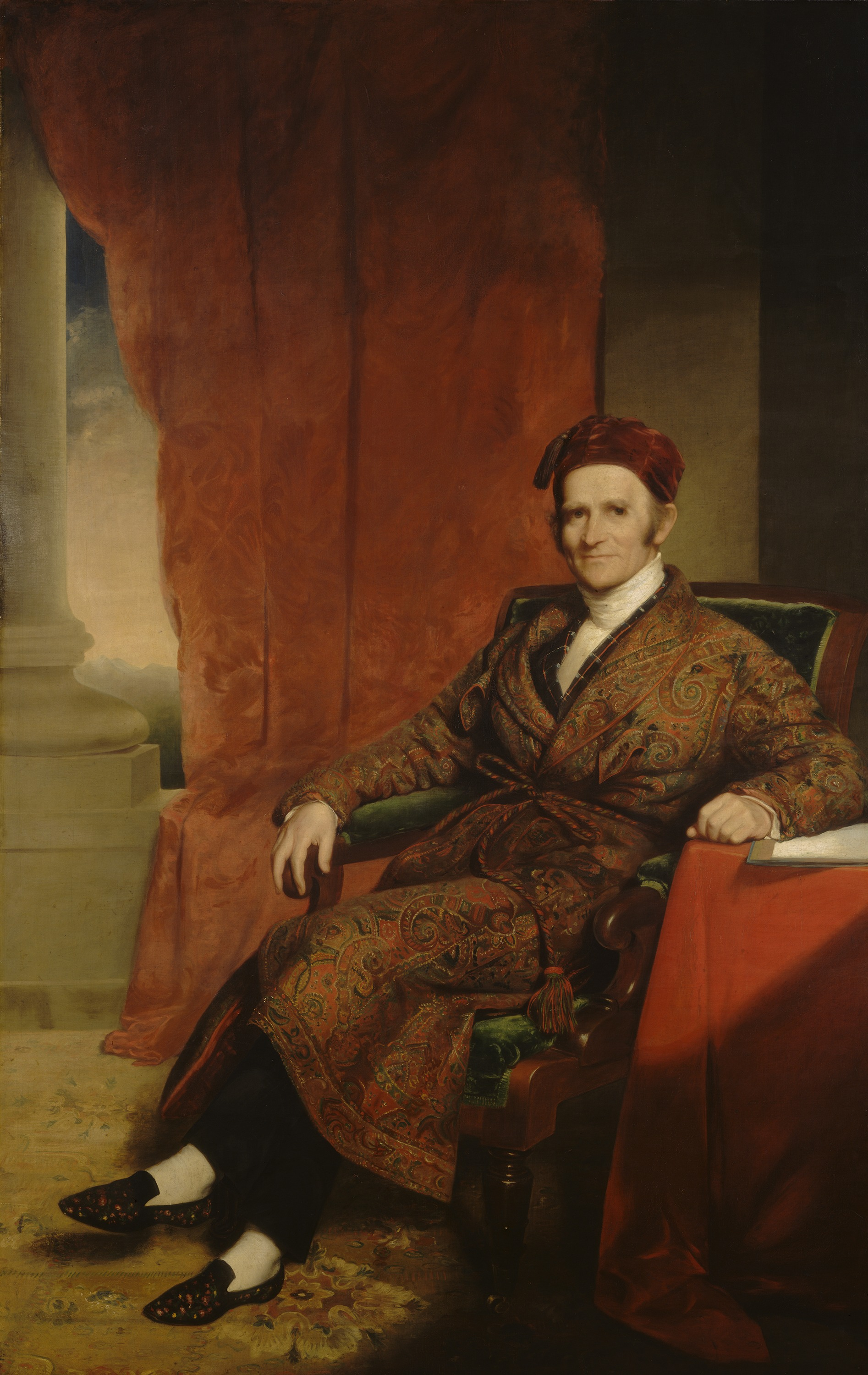
Amos Lawrence

==== Amos Lawrence ====
Amos Lawrence, the fourth son of Samuel and Susannah (Parker) Lawrence, was born in Groton, Massachusetts. Lawrence attended elementary school in Groton and briefly attended the Groton Academy. He and his brother, Abbott, founded A. & A. Lawrence and Co., located in Lawrence, Massachusetts, became one of the greatest wholesale mercantile house in the United States. His later years were spent philanthropically, giving over $639,000 (in 1840s dollars) to charitable causes. Some beneficiaries included Williams College ($40,000); Groton Academy (which later changed it name to Lawrence Academy); Wabash College; Kenyon College and the theological seminary at Bangor, Maine. He also contributed funds to complete the Bunker Hill Monument. In addition to founding Lawrence, Massachusetts, Amos also founded Lawrence, Kansas through his work with the New England Emigrant Aid Company, and the University of Kansas.

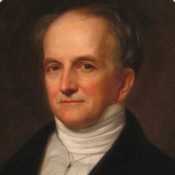
Abbott Lawrence

==== Abbott Lawrence ====
Abbott Lawrence, brother of Amos, was born December 16, 1792 in Groton. He attended Groton Academy (now Lawrence Academy) and became an apprentice to his brother, Amos. Abbott married Katherine Bigelow, daughter of Timothy Bigelow and sister of John P. Bigelow. In the 1820s, Lawrence became a prominent public figure, including as a vocal supporter of railroad construction for economic benefit. He was an ardent protectionist, and represented Massachusetts at the Harrisburg protectionist convention in 1827. Lawrence was highly influential among Massachusetts Whigs. In 1834, he was elected US Representative as a Whig serving in the 24th Congress. In 1840, he took an active part in the successful presidential campaign of William Henry Harrison. Lawrence was elected a member of the American Antiquarian Society in 1846, and subsequently was also elected a Fellow of the American Academy of Arts and Sciences in 1847. In 1848, Lawrence was an unsuccessful candidate for party nomination as vice president on the Whig ticket, headed by Zachary Taylor. After Taylor's presidential victory, he offered Lawrence a choice of positions in the administration. Lawrence rejected a cabinet appointment, and chose the post of minister to Great Britain. He supported Lawrence Academy, affordable housing in Boston, and the Boston Public Library. He also provided $50,000 to establish the Lawrence Scientific School at Harvard College, and provided a similar sum in his will for the School. He died in Boston on August 18, 1855, aged 62, and was interred in Mount Auburn Cemetery, Cambridge, Massachusetts.

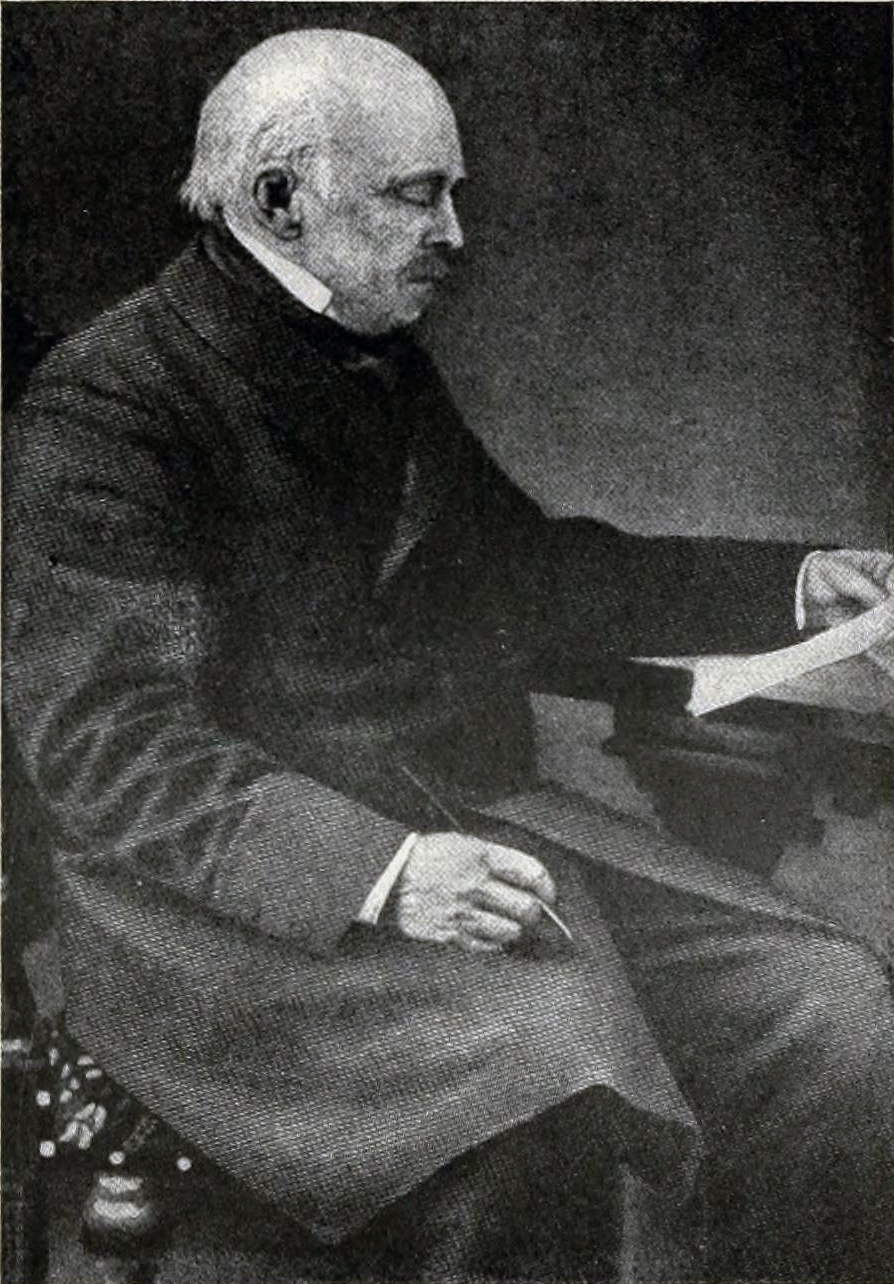
Amos Adams Lawrence

==== Amos Adams Lawrence ====
Amos Adams Lawrence (July 31, 1814 – August 22, 1886), the son of Amos Lawrence, was born in Boston, Massachusetts on July 31, 1814 and died in Nahant, Massachusetts on August 22, 1886. Lawrence attended Franklin Academy in Andover, Massachusetts, before entering Harvard in 1831, graduating in 1835. He was a key person in the United States abolition movement shortly before the Civil War. He was important in building the University of Kansas in Lawrence, Kansas and Lawrence University in Appleton, Wisconsin. Amos married Sarah Elizabeth Appleton, a daughter of U.S. Representative William Appleton and Mary Ann Appleton (née Cutler). Amos and Sarah had seven children:

- Amory Appleton Lawrence (1848–1912)
- William Lawrence (1850–1941), who became the Bishop of Massachusetts
- Susan Mason Lawrence (1852–1923)
- Sarah Lawrence (1845–1915)
- Marianne Appleton Lawrence (1843–1882)
- Hetty Sullivan Lawrence 1855–1931)
- Harriet Dexter Lawrence Hemenway (1858–1960), who became a co-founder of the Massachusetts Audubon Society

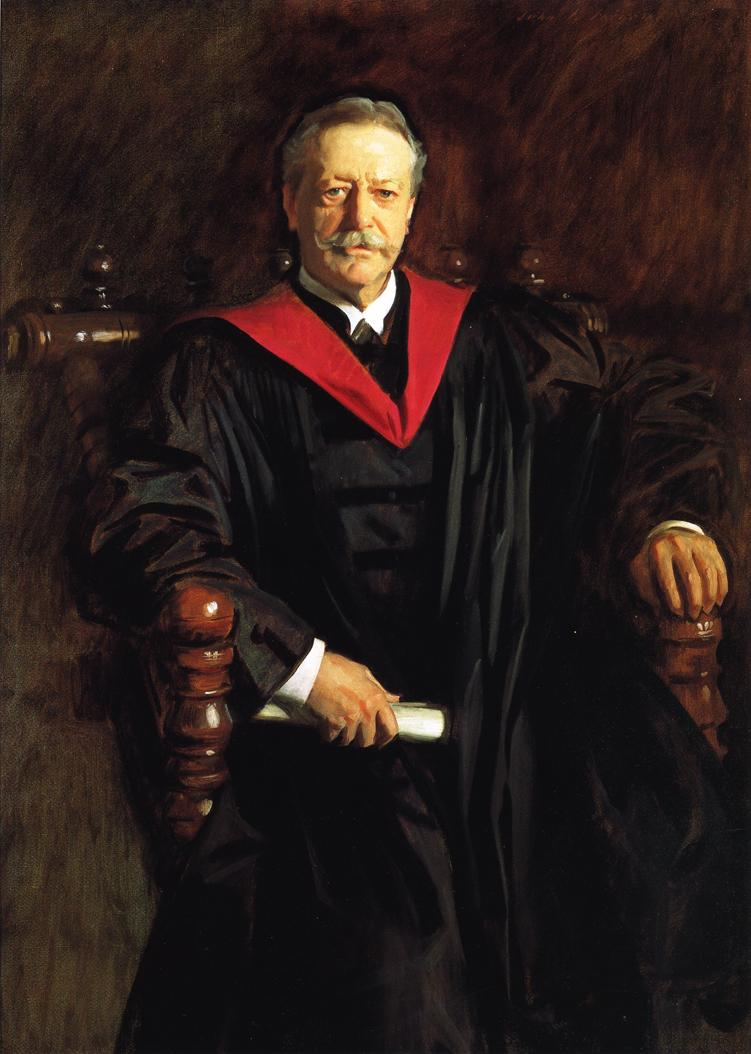
Abbott Lawrence Lowell

==== Abbott Lawrence Lowell ====
Abbott Lawrence Lowell was born on December 13, 1856, in Boston, Massachusetts, the second son of Augustus Lowell and Katherine Bigelow Lowell. His mother was a cousin of architect Charles H. Bigelow. A member of the Brahmin Lowell family, his siblings included the poet Amy Lowell, the astronomer Percival Lowell, and Elizabeth Lowell Putnam, an early activist for prenatal care. They were the great-grandchildren of John Lowell and, on their mother's side, the grandchildren of Abbott Lawrence. He was President of Harvard University from 1909 to 1933.

== Notable members ==
- Samuel Lawrence (died 1827), revolutionary
  - Amos Lawrence (1786–1852), merchant
    - Amos Adams Lawrence (1814–1886), abolitionist
      - William Lawrence (1850–1941), Episcopal bishop
        - William Appleton Lawrence (1889–1963), Episcopal bishop
        - Frederic C. Lawrence (1899–1989), Episcopal bishop
  - Abbott Lawrence (1792–1855), U.S. congressman, founder of Lawrence, Massachusetts
    - Abbott Lawrence Lowell (1856–1943), president of Harvard University
  - Luther Lawrence (died 1839), politician
  - Harriet Lawrence Hemenway (died 1960), co-founder of the Massachusetts Audubon Society

== Associated families and figures ==
The following is a list of families and figures closely aligned with the Lawrence family.

- Adams family
- Amory family
- Appelton family
- Timothy Bigelow
- John Prescott Bigelow
- Cabot family
- Cunningham family
- Dana family
- Loring family
- Lowell family
- Peabody family
- Samuel Endicott Peabody
- President Franklin Pierce
- Oliver Prescott
- Saltonstall family
