= 1787 Massachusetts gubernatorial election =

- April 2, 1787
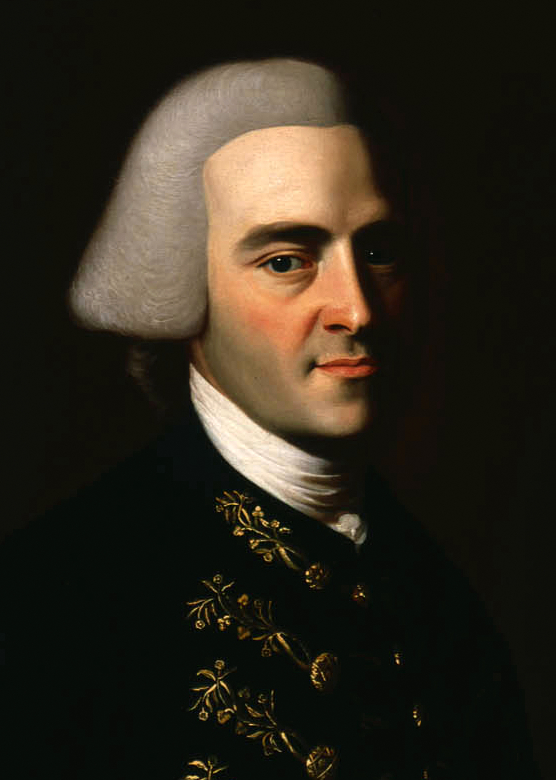

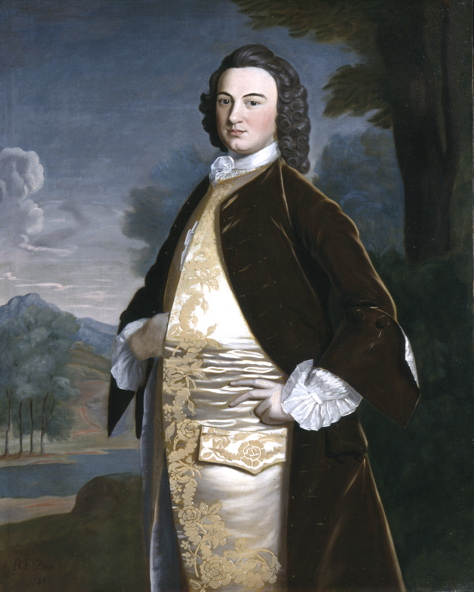
| Nominee | John Hancock | James Bowdoin |
| Party | Nonpartisan | Nonpartisan |
| Popular vote | 18,475 | 5,394 |
| Percentage | 75.09% | 21.92% |
- County results Hancock: 40–50% 50–60% 60–70% 70–80% 80–90%
Governor before election
James Bowdoin
Nonpartisan
Elected Governor
John Hancock
Nonpartisan

A gubernatorial election was held in Massachusetts on April 2, 1787. John Hancock, who had served as the first governor of the Commonwealth of Massachusetts from 1780 to 1785, defeated James Bowdoin, the incumbent governor.

The election took place in the aftermath of Shays's Rebellion, for which Bowdoin was sharply censured. First elected in 1785, Bowdoin once in office pursued an economic policy of austerity that dramatically increased the tax burden on lower-class citizens, leading to judicial foreclosures against those owing back taxes, including many Continental Army veterans. After backcountry farmers rose in revolt, critics of the administration, including moderate fellow conservatives, charged that Bowdoin had acted unwisely by levying taxes "heavier than the People could bear." Bowdoin's harsh response to the rebels, several thousand of whom were summarily stripped of their right to vote, hold public office, or serve as jurors, was denounced as "self-serving" and "a violation of republican principles." In the election, the voters overwhelmingly rejected Bowdoin, who lost to Hancock by 13,081 votes.

== Results ==
Massachusetts gubernatorial election, 1787
| Party | Candidate | Votes | % | ±% |
|---|---|---|---|---|
| Nonpartisan | John Hancock | 18,475 | 75.09% | +57.60 |
| Nonpartisan | James Bowdoin (incumbent) | 5,394 | 21.92% | −60.59 |
| Nonpartisan | Benjamin Lincoln | 513 | 2.09% | |
| Nonpartisan | Nathaniel Gorham | 81 | 0.33% | |
| Nonpartisan | Isaac Backus | 60 | 0.24% | |
| Nonpartisan | Thomas Cushing | 34 | 0.14% | |
| Nonpartisan | John Worthington | 15 | 0.06% | |
| Nonpartisan | Samuel Phillips Jr. | 9 | 0.04% | |
| Nonpartisan | Samuel Holten | 4 | 0.02% | |
| Nonpartisan | Nathaniel Kingsley | 3 | 0.01% | |
| Nonpartisan | Cotton Tufts | 3 | 0.01% | |
| Nonpartisan | James Warren | 3 | 0.01% | |
| Nonpartisan | George Leonard | 2 | 0.01% | |
| Nonpartisan | Oliver Prescott | 2 | 0.01% | |
| Nonpartisan | Caleb Strong | 2 | 0.01% | |
| Nonpartisan | Samuel Adams | 1 | 0.00% | |
| Nonpartisan | Daws | 1 | 0.00% | |
| Nonpartisan | John Manning | 1 | 0.00% | |
| Nonpartisan | Elisha May | 1 | 0.00% | |
| Total votes | | 24,604 | 100.00% | |
| Nonpartisan hold | | | | |

=== Results by county ===
| | John Hancock Nonpartisan | | James Bowdoin Nonpartisan | | Scattering | | County total |
| County | Votes | Percent | Votes | Percent | Votes | Percent | County total |
|---|---|---|---|---|---|---|---|
| Barnstable | 398 | 81.89 | 78 | 16.05 | 10 (Note: Cushing 7, Backus 3) | 2.06 | 486 |
| Berkshire | 627 | 59.04 | 337 | 31.73 | 98 (Note: Lincoln 84, Cushing 13, Kingsley 1,) | 9.23 | 1,062 |
| Bristol | 1,982 | 87.27 | 287 | 12.64 | 2 (Note: Cushing 1, May 1) | 0.08 | 2,271 |
| Cumberland | 415 | 75.04 | 92 | 16.63 | 46 (Note: Backus 46) | 8.31 | 553 |
| Dukes | 153 | 71.16 | 60 | 27.91 | 2 (Note: Lincoln 2) | 0.93 | 215 |
| Essex | 2,010 | 68.76 | 850 | 29.08 | 63 (Note: Lincoln 46, Phillips 8, Cushing 4, Holten 2, Gorham 1, Manning 1, Worthington 1) | 2.16 | 2,923 |
| Hampshire | 1,036 | 48.23 | 809 | 37.66 | 303 (Note: Lincoln 247, Gorham 30, Worthington 14, Backus 5, Cushing 5, Strong 1, Warren 1) | 14.11 | 2,148 |
| Lincoln | 415 | 83.17 | 78 | 15.63 | 6 (Note: Lincoln 4, Kingsley 2) | 1.20 | 499 |
| Middlesex | 3,142 | 82.60 | 621 | 16.32 | 41 (Note: Lincoln 31, Gorham 5, Cushing 2, Prescott 2, Phillips 1) | 1.08 | 3,804 |
| Nantucket | 56 | 50.45 | 53 | 47.75 | 2 (Note: Lincoln 1, Cushing 1) | 1.80 | 111 |
| Plymouth | 1,545 | 83.20 | 308 | 16.58 | 4 (Note: Gorham 15, Lincoln 4, Tufts 3, Warren 2, Leonard 2, Adams 1, Backus 1, Cushing 1) | 0.22 | 1,857 |
| Suffolk | 2,629 | 68.18 | 1,190 | 30.86 | 37 (Note: Lincoln 24, Gorham 12, Daws 1) | 9.60 | 3,856 |
| Worcester | 3,472 | 84.42 | 557 | 13.54 | 84 (Note: Lincoln 70, Gorham 6, Backus 5, Holten 2, Strong 1) | 2.04 | 4,113 |
| York | 586 | 87.20 | 74 | 11.01 | 12 (Note: Gorham 12) | 1.78 | 672 |
| TOTAL | 18,475 | 75.09 | 5,394 | 21.92 | 735 | 2.99 | 24,604 |
