= Justice Forbes =

Justice Forbes may refer to:

- Charles E. Forbes (1795–1881), justice of the Massachusetts Supreme Judicial Court
- Francis Forbes (1784–1841), chief justice of Newfoundland and chief justice of New South Wales
