= Amos A. Lawrence =

Abolitionist

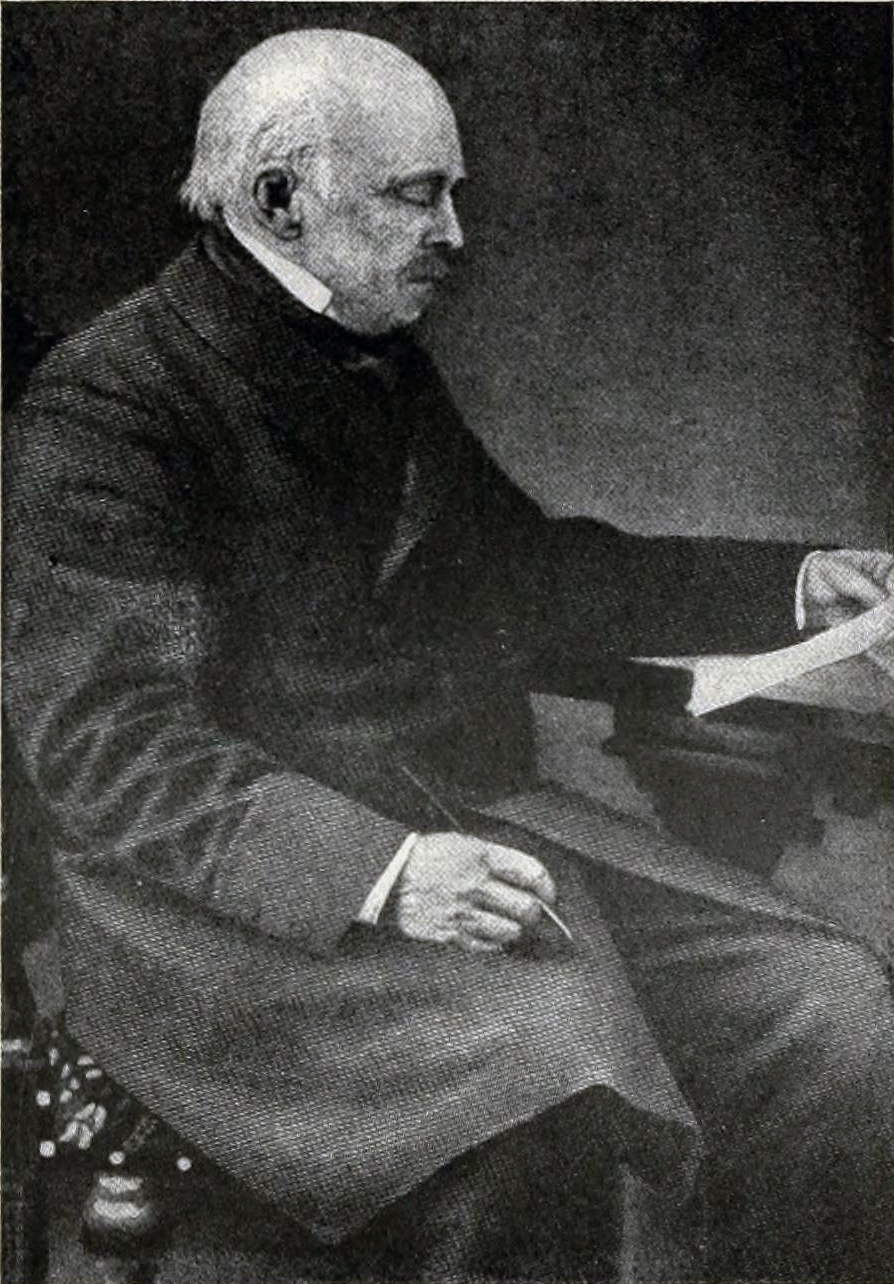
- Amos A. Lawrence seated at desk, c. 1880
- Born: Amos Adams Lawrence; July 31, 1814; Groton, Massachusetts, US
- Died: August 22, 1886 (aged 72); Nahant, Massachusetts, US
- Education: Groton Academy (now called Lawrence Academy)
- Alma mater: Harvard College
- Occupations: Merchant, abolitionist
- Known for: Privately donating funds to the founding of the University of Kansas anti-slavery movement Jayhawker movement
- Political party: Whig; American (1858); Constitutional Union (1860); Republican
- Spouse: Sarah Appleton (m. 1842)
- Children: 4, including William and Harriet
- Parent: Amos Lawrence
- Relatives: Samuel Lawrence (grandfather); Luther Lawrence (uncle); Abbott Lawrence (uncle); Jane Pierce (cousin)

Amos Adams Lawrence (July 31, 1814 – August 22, 1886) was an American businessman, philanthropist, and social activist. He was a key figure in the United States abolitionist movement in the years leading up to the Civil War and the growth of the Episcopal Church in Massachusetts. He was instrumental in the establishment of the University of Kansas and Lawrence University in Appleton, Wisconsin.

== Early life ==
Lawrence was born in Boston, Massachusetts on July 31, 1814. His father, Amos Lawrence, was a merchant, philanthropist, and member of the prominent Lawrence family.

He was educated at Groton Academy and was graduated at Harvard College in 1835.

== Career ==
Following his graduation from Harvard, Lawrence entered business for himself as a commission merchant and eventually became owner of Ipswich Mills, the largest producer of knit goods in the country.

In 1858 and 1860, he was a candidate for governor of Massachusetts.

=== Philanthropy ===
Lawrence financed the founding of the University of Kansas in Lawrence, Kansas, which was named after him.

In 1847, he founded a college that is today Lawrence University on 5,000 acres (20 km^{2}) of land that he had purchased in 1844 in the Fox River Valley. Some of the land he purchased became Appleton, Wisconsin, named for his father-in-law, William Appleton.

His farm outside of Boston became the campus for Boston College. From 1857 to 1862 he was treasurer of Harvard College, and from 1879 to 1885 an overseer. Lawrence also contributed large sums of money to Harvard, the Episcopal Theological School in Cambridge, Massachusetts, Lawrence Academy, and Groton School.

=== Abolitionism and the Civil War ===
Lawrence credited the Anthony Burns affair in the spring of 1854 with radicalizing him and other cotton merchants on the issue of slavery: "[W]e went to bed one night old fashioned, conservative, Compromise Union Whigs & waked up stark mad Abolitionists."

Lawrence contributed large amounts of capital to the Massachusetts Emigrant Aid Company and funds for the colonization of free negroes in Liberia. He donated guns, specifically Sharps rifles, which were shipped to Jayhawkers and abolitionists in Kansas as "books" and "primers." During the bloodshed in Kansas, Lawrence wrote frequently to President Franklin Pierce, the husband of Lawrence's cousin Jane, on behalf of the free-state settlers.

He also provided funds for the activism and legal defense of John Brown, though he deplored Brown's fanaticism and urged against violent resistance to the federal government. When Brown was arrested at Harpers Ferry, Lawrence appealed to the Governor of Virginia to secure a lawful trial.

In 1862, he raised a battalion of cavalry which became the 2nd Massachusetts Cavalry, of which Charles Russell Lowell was colonel.

== Personal life ==
In 1842, Lawrence married Sarah Elizabeth Appleton, daughter of U.S. Representative William Appleton and Mary Ann (née Cutler) Appleton. They had the following children:

- Maryanne Appleton Lawrence (1843-1882), m. Robert Amory (1842-1910)
- Amory Appleton Lawrence (1848–1912)
- William Lawrence (1850–1941), who became the Bishop of Massachusetts.
- Susan Mason Lawrence (1852–1923)
- Hetty Sullivan Cunningham (1855-1931)
- Harriet Lawrence Hemenway (1858-1960), who became a co-founder of the Massachusetts Audubon Society.

=== Descendants ===
Through his son William, Lawrence was the grandfather of William Appleton Lawrence (1889–1968), who was elected third Bishop of the Episcopal Diocese of Western Massachusetts, and Frederic Cunningham Lawrence (1899–1989), a suffragan bishop of the Episcopal Diocese of Massachusetts.

== Death and legacy ==
He died at his summer resort in Nahant, Massachusetts, in 1886.

=== Legacy ===
Lawrence is credited with founding an Episcopal church in Boston, Massachusetts, which prompted many Boston Brahmins to convert from Unitarianism. His son, William Lawrence, became the long-time Bishop of the Episcopal Church in Massachusetts.

His alma mater, Groton Academy was later renamed after him. Today, it is the Lawrence Academy at Groton.

== Notes ==
Party political offices
Preceded by Henry Gardner	Know Nothing nominee for Governor of Massachusetts; 1858	Succeeded by George N. Briggs
First	Constitutional Union nominee for Governor of Massachusetts; 1860	Succeeded by None
