= Bement Camp and Conference Center =

Coordinates: 42°10′50.0″N 71°57′52.1″W

Bement Camp and Conference Center, also known as Camp Bement or just Bement, was a summer camp in Charlton, Massachusetts, U.S. . It opened in the summer of 1948 and was in continuous operation for the next 60 years.

== History ==
On Christmas Eve, 1944, Mary V. Bement died. In her will she left a trust fund of 1.5 million dollars to the Episcopal Diocese of Western Massachusetts. The Diocese was to use the interest from that trust for "the religious, charitable and educational work of the Diocese." Bishop William Appleton Lawrence had a 110-acre (0.45 km^{2}) plot of land purchased for a summer church camp in Charlton, Massachusetts, which they named Bement Center Camp. The Camp was subsequently called Bement Camp and Conference Center, also known as Camp Bement or just Bement.

The camp grew through purchases and gifts of land. By the early 1970s it had grown to over 550 acres (2.2 km^{2}). Following the untimely death of Camp Director Mark Rourke in 2004 due to a glioblastoma, the camp went through a rapid series of director and staff changes and enrollment plummeted.

In spring 2009, the Episcopal Diocese of Western Massachusetts announced the closure of the camp, and that a discernment committee would be formed to determine the future of the camp.
