= First Parish Church of Groton =

Historic church in Massachusetts, United States

- U.S. National Register of Historic Places
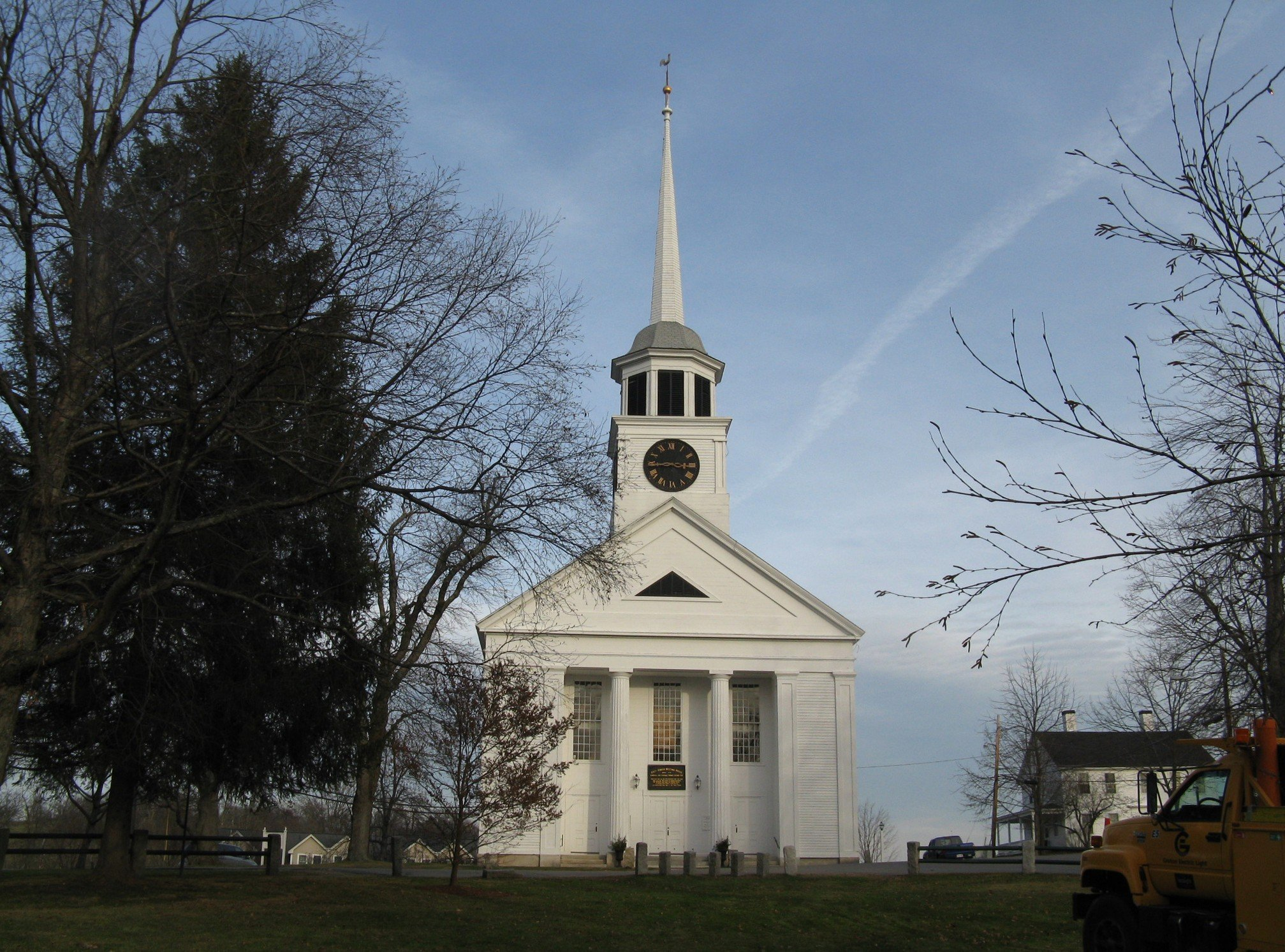

- Location within Massachusetts Location within the United States
- Location: 1 Powderhouse Road, Groton, Massachusetts
- Coordinates: 42°36′20″N 71°34′2″W
- Built: 1754
- Architectural style: Georgian; Greek Revival
- NRHP reference No.: 100005275
- Added to NRHP: March 16, 2021

The First Parish Church of Groton is a historic church building at 1 Powderhouse Road in Groton, Massachusetts. It was built in 1754-55 and restyled in 1839 for a congregation whose history dates to the founding of the community in the 17th century. The building was listed on the National Register of Historic Places in 2021.

== The building ==
Groton's First Parish Church stands in the village center of the town, between Powderhouse Road (a loop road also providing access to Lawrence Academy, and Lowell Road (Massachusetts Route 40). It is a two-story timber-frame structure, with a gabled roof and clapboarded exterior. Its main facade is three bays wide, surmounted by a tower with clock, bell, and steeple. The bays are recessed, with two columns set in antes at the front of the recess, with pilasters at the building and recess corners. A full entablature extends across the front and sides of the building, and there is a triangular ornament at the center of the tympanum. The church bell, added about 1819, is from Revere and Sons.

== Parish history ==
The building is the fourth for a congregation that was formed in 1666, and the second to stand on this site. Construction began in 1754 and was completed the following year. The building was damaged by lightning in 1795, and underwent a major Greek Revival restyling in 1839. The church congregation, originally Congregationalist in outlook, was subject to schism between Unitarian and Trinitarian factions, with the latter group departing 1826. The greenspace in front of the church was where the local militia company gathered in April 1775 to join the Battles of Lexington and Concord.

Joshua Young was minister from 1875 until his death in 1904.

== See also ==
- National Register of Historic Places listings in Middlesex County, Massachusetts
