= Eric Gaskins =

American fashion designer

Eric Gaskins

Eric Gaskins (born 1958) is a New York-based fashion designer known for his craftsmanship and technique.

Gaskins was born in Germany and grew up in Groton, Massachusetts. He attended Lawrence Academy and graduated from Kenyon College with a degree in fine arts. He moved to Paris, where he was trained by Hubert Givenchy. After his return to the United States, he designed for Koos Van Den Akker, Bob Evans, and Scott Barrie. In 1987, he launched his own label in New York, where he currently lives. His design philosophy is “to create clothes that are essential, without artifice or contrivance”.

Gaskins releases his couture collections four times annually under his own line. It is modern day and evening wear. He mainly focuses on dresses, suits, and gowns.

His designs have been featured on the covers of Cosmopolitan, Spy, Bazaar, Glamour, Vanity Fair, and Palm Beach Illustrated. Other significant editorial coverage included such magazines and television programs as: Self, New Woman, Elle, Essence and Entertainment Tonight. Among his celebrity clients are Salma Hayek, Melanie Griffith, Vanessa Williams, Mariah Carey, Geena Davis, Maria Shriver, Jada Pinkett Smith, Jennifer Lopez, Allison Janney, Kim Cattrall, Kathy Bates, Marcia Gay Harden, Goldie Hawn and Colleen Zenk of "As The World Turns" fame.

He closed his design business in mid-2009, simultaneously announcing that he was the pseudonymous author of the notoriously biting fashion blog The Emperor's Old Clothes, where he blogged under the identity "Fluff Chance", "a hairless Sphynx cat that uses designers as a clawing post".
