= Richard Fletcher (American politician) =

American judge (1788–1869)

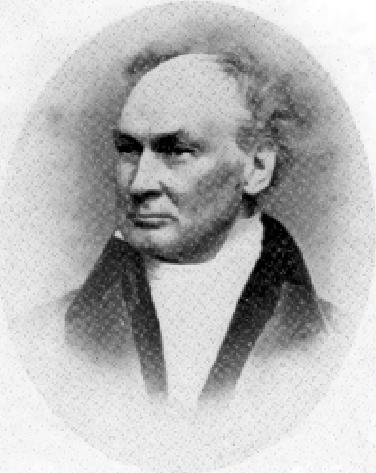

Member of the U.S. House of Representatives from Massachusetts's 1st district
- In office March 4, 1837 – March 3, 1839
- Preceded by: Abbott Lawrence
- Succeeded by: Abbott Lawrence

Personal details
- Born: January 8, 1788 Cavendish, Vermont
- Died: June 21, 1869 (aged 81) Boston, Massachusetts
- Party: Whig

Richard Fletcher (January 8, 1788 – June 21, 1869) was a member of the United States House of Representatives from Massachusetts. The brother of Governor Ryland Fletcher, he was born in Cavendish, Vermont on January 8, 1788. He pursued classical studies and graduated from Dartmouth College in 1806. He taught school in Salisbury, New Hampshire, studied law, was admitted to the bar and commenced practice there.

He moved to Boston in 1819 and was elected as a Whig to the Twenty-fifth Congress (March 4, 1837 – March 3, 1839). Fletcher was not a candidate for renomination to the Twenty-sixth Congress. He served as a judge of the Massachusetts Supreme Court 1848–1853, and died in Boston on June 21, 1869. His interment was in Mount Auburn Cemetery in Cambridge.

Fletcher was elected as the first president of the American Statistical Association, although by the ASA's own admission, he was "little more than a figurehead".

== See also ==
- List of presidents of the American Statistical Association

== Sources ==
- United States Congress. "Richard Fletcher (id: F000203)". Biographical Directory of the United States Congress.

U.S. House of Representatives
Preceded by Abbott Lawrence	Member of the U.S. House of Representatives from Massachusetts's 1st congressional district March 4, 1837 — March 3, 1839	Succeeded by Abbott Lawrence
Legal offices
Preceded by Charles E. Forbes	Associate Justice of the Massachusetts Supreme Judicial Court; 1848-1853	Succeeded by Benjamin Thomas
