= Robert Amory =

American physician

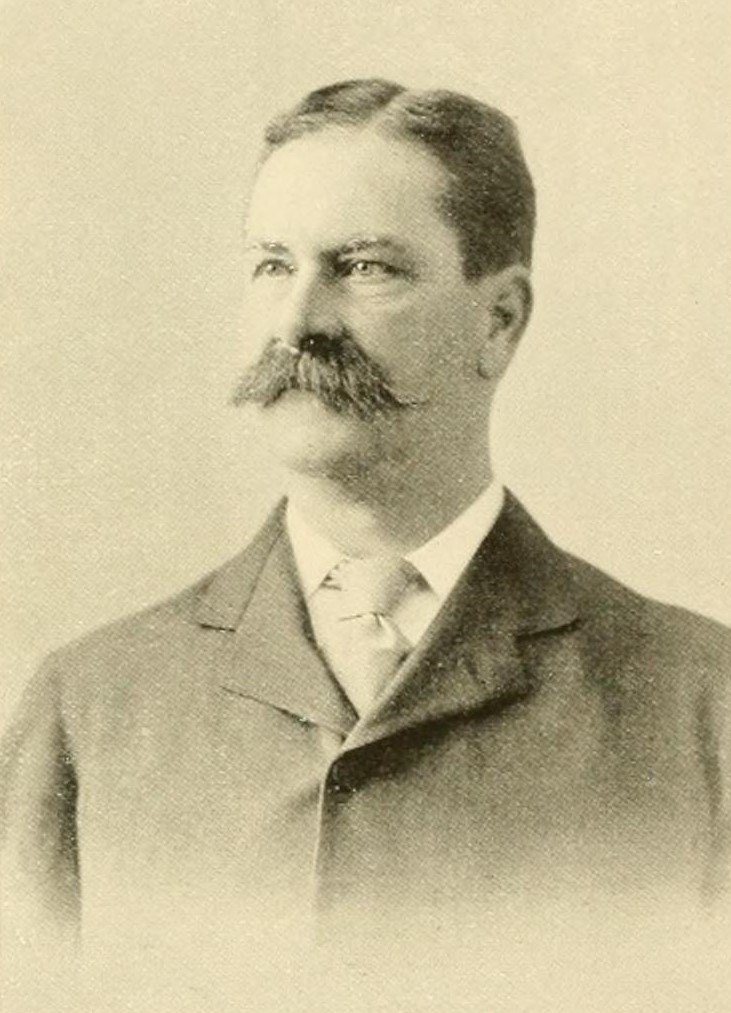
- Amory in an 1896 publication
- Born: May 3, 1842; Boston, Massachusetts, U.S.
- Died: August 27, 1910 (aged 68); Nahant, Massachusetts, U.S.
- Education: Harvard College (1863); Harvard Medical School (1866)
- Occupation: Physician
- Relatives: Amos A. Lawrence (father-in-law)

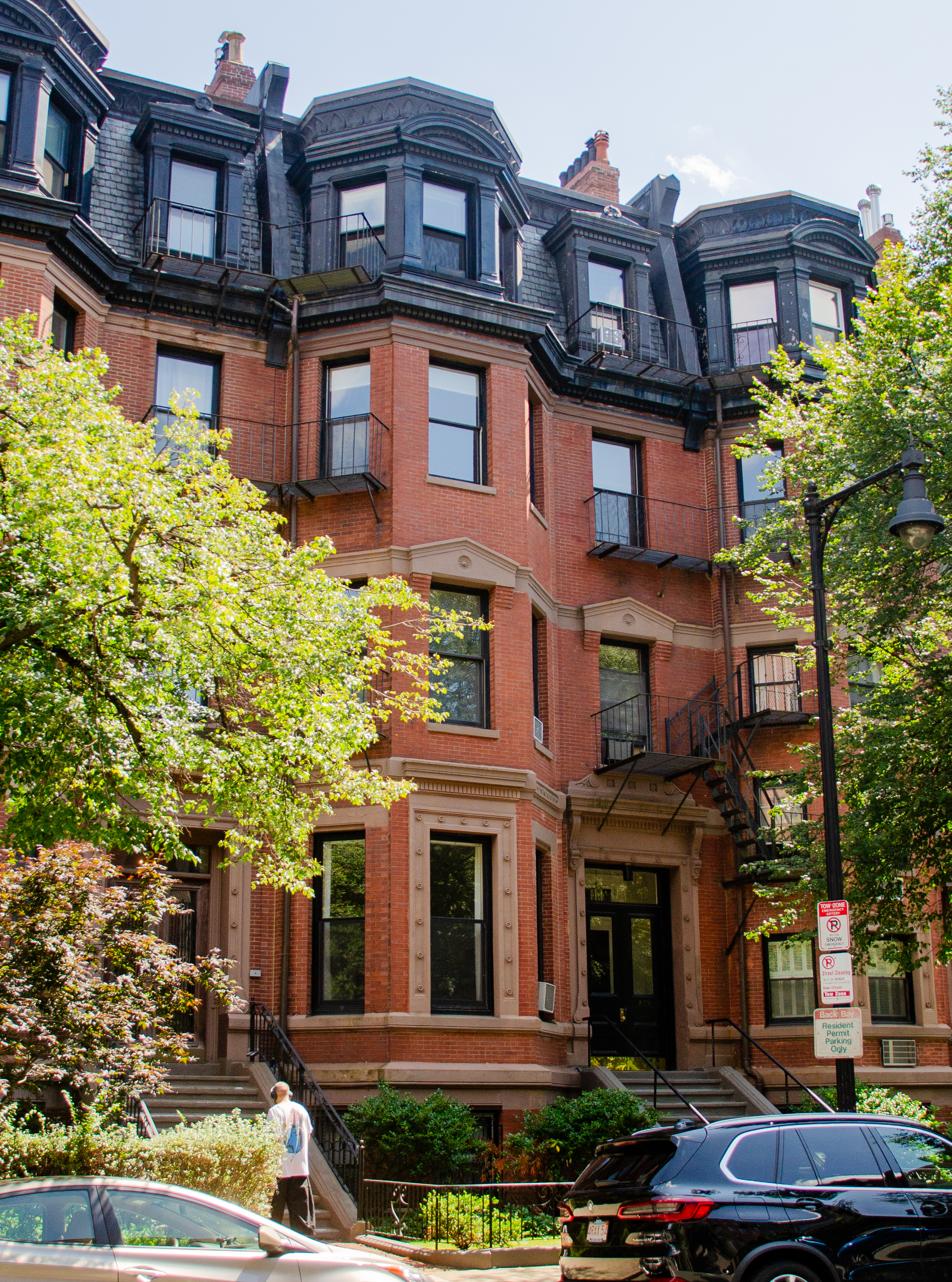
279 Beacon St., Amory's Back Bay residence, designed by Peabody & Stearns

Robert Amory (May 3, 1842 – August 27, 1910) was an American physician.

== Biography ==
Robert Amory was born on May 3, 1842 in Boston, Massachusetts. He was the third of six sons of James Sullivan Amory, a manufacturer of cotton goods, and his wife, Mary Copley Greene, a granddaughter of John Singleton Copley, the portrait-painter. Their Brookline home had a peculiar charm; friend and stranger alike were impressed by the warm, cordial hospitality, courteous manners and the atmosphere of refinement and culture; much attention was given to the religious and moral development of the boys. The older ones attended Epes Sargent Dixwell's school in Boston. Amory graduated from Harvard College in 1863 and from the Harvard Medical School in 1866.

On May 12, 1864 he married Marianne Appleton Lawrence (1843–1882), daughter of Amos Adams Lawrence and his wife, Sarah Appleton. Together, they had one child named Alice. After Marianne's death on May 15, 1882, Robert was remarried on September 4, 1884 to Katharine Leighton Crehore (1862–1920) and had four more children.

After the medical school days, the year 1867 was spent abroad chiefly in Paris, France, where Robert Amory devoted his time to the experimental study of the action of drugs on animals. He returned home, settled in Brookline, and soon had a small laboratory in his stable, where his experimental researches were continued. In 1869 he became lecturer on the physiological action of drugs in the Harvard Medical School, and in 1871 was made professor of physiology at Bowdoin College Medical School in Brunswick, Maine. He taught there four years, and gave it up most reluctantly in order to resume his Brookline practice.

In time the little stable laboratory was replaced by a commodious house on LaGrange Street, Boston, where lectures and laboratory courses were given to all interested in experimental biology. The Boston Society of Medical Sciences held meetings there. Amory was one of its founders; he was a fellow of the Massachusetts Medical Society, the Boston Society for Medical Observation, and the American Academy of Arts and Sciences. When the state of Massachusetts created the office of medical examiner, Amory was the first to be appointed from his district and was the medical examiner of Norfolk County for six years. He held several positions in the medical corps of the Massachusetts Volunteer Militia. In 1880 he was president of the National Decennial Convention for the Revision of the United States Pharmacopoeia.

During the summer months Amory had a medical practice in Bar Harbor, Maine, where he built himself a cottage. He was always interested in physics and it was natural that the invention of the telephone should fascinate him; so when Professor Alexander Bell came to Boston to test and perfect his new inventions, Amory sought him out to extend to him and to his colleagues an invitation to use his laboratory, where several devices were invented and tested.

Later on Amory withdrew from medical work to devote his time to business. He became the treasurer and later president of the Brookline Gas and Electric Light Company, where he remained until 1908.

Among many contributions to the medical journals may be mentioned, "Chloral Hydrate; Experiments Disproving the Evolution of Chloroform in the Organism;" Nitrous Oxide Gas;" the "Pathological Action of Prussic Acid;" "Photography of the Spectrum."

He published two books, one in 1875, a translation of Émile Küss' Lectures on Physiology; another in 1883, a textbook on electrolysis. He also edited the second, third, and fourth editions of Wharton and Moreton Stillé's Medical Jurisprudence, which for many years was used as a textbook in toxicology.

Robert Amory died on August 27, 1910, in Nahant, Massachusetts.

== Works ==
- "Physiological and Therapeutical Action of Bromides of Potassium and Ammonium" (1872)
- "Wharton and Stille's Medical Jurisprudence," 4th and 5th editions (1882)
- "Treatise on Electrolysis in Medicine," (1886)
