= 1785 Massachusetts gubernatorial election =

- April 4, 1785
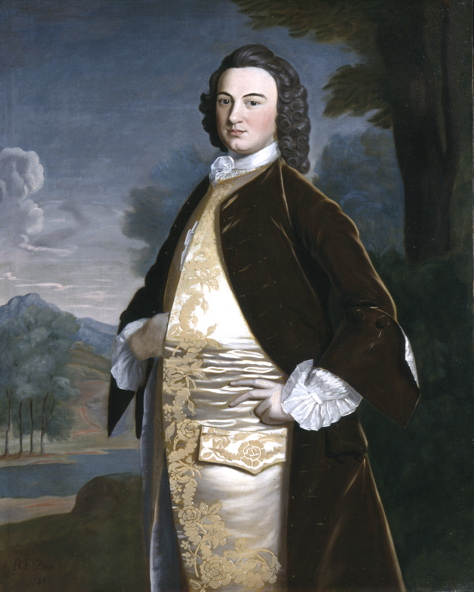

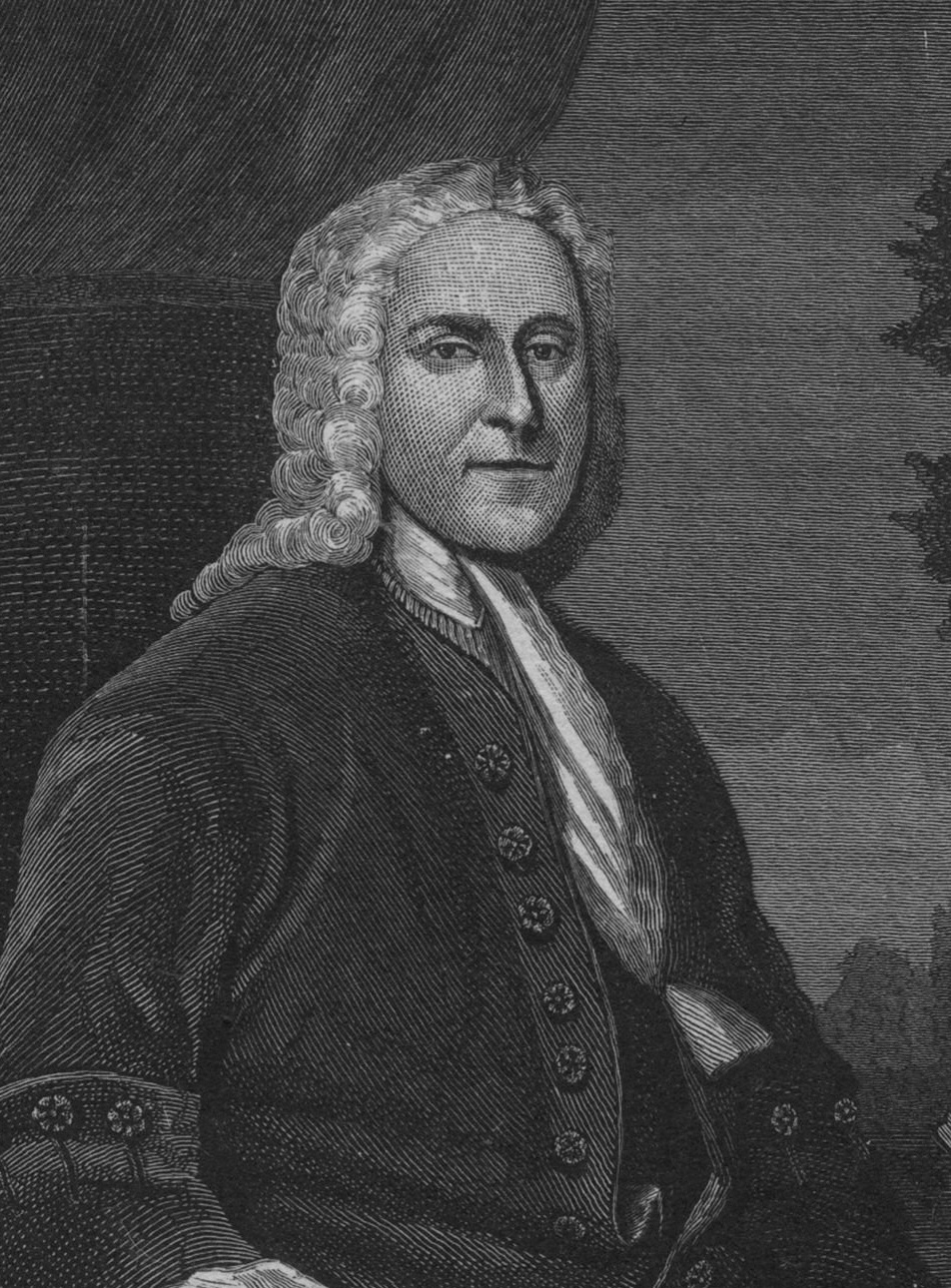

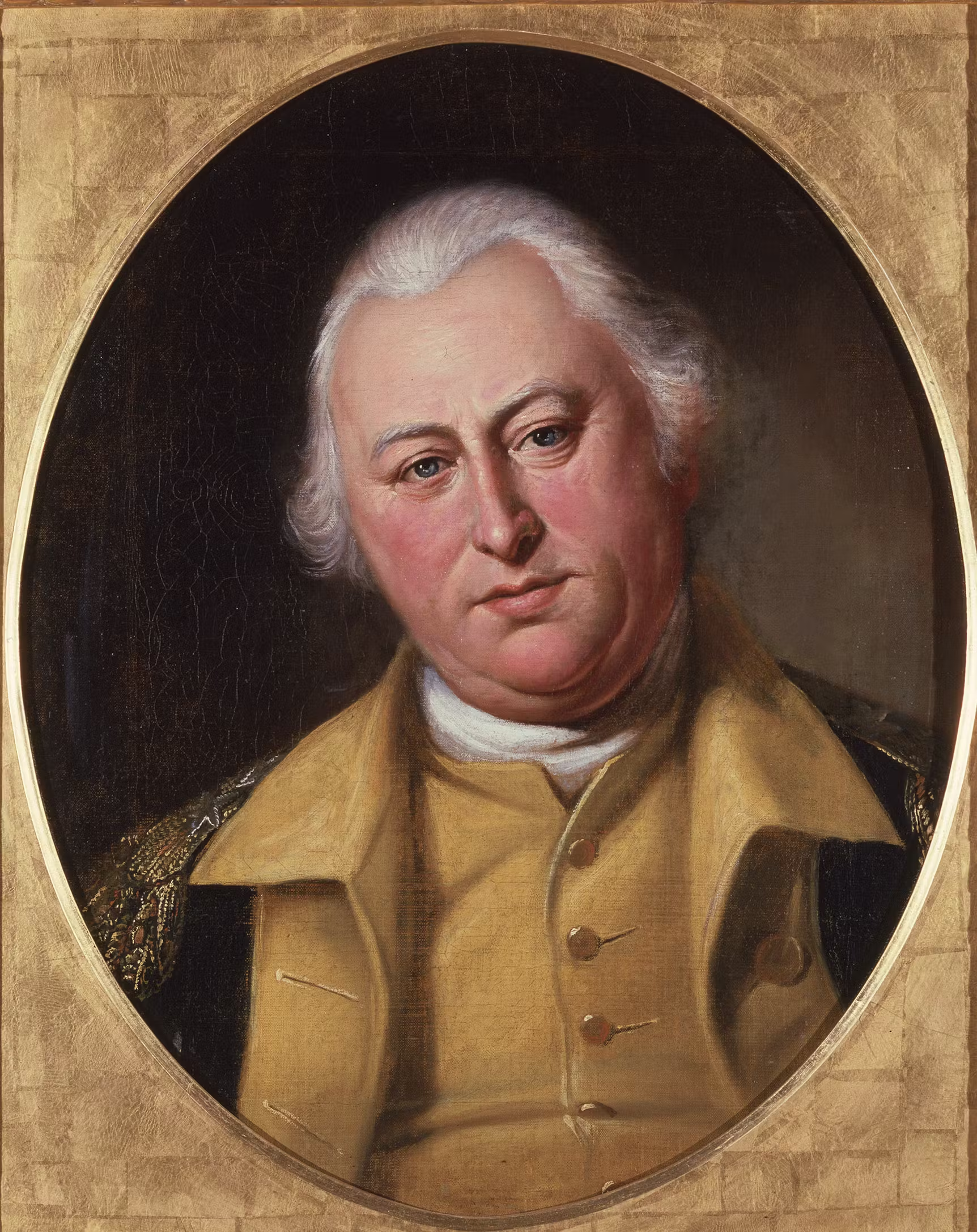
Nominee	James Bowdoin	Thomas Cushing	Benjamin Lincoln
Party	Nonpartisan	Nonpartisan	Nonpartisan
Electoral vote	18	10	Eliminated
Popular vote	3,510	3,005	1,152
Percentage	44.07%	37.73%	14.46%
- County results Bowdoin: 30–40% 40–50% 50–60% 70–80% Cushing: 20–30% 30–40% 40–50% 60–70% No Data/Vote
Governor before election
Thomas Cushing (acting)
Nonpartisan
Elected Governor
James Bowdoin
Nonpartisan

A gubernatorial election was held in Massachusetts on April 4, 1785. James Bowdoin, the former president of the Massachusetts Constitutional Convention, received more votes than any of his rivals—Thomas Cushing, the incumbent acting governor, Benjamin Lincoln, the former United States secretary of war, and Oliver Prescott, the judge of the probate court for Middlesex County—but no candidate received a majority of the votes cast. The election was decided by the Massachusetts General Court, which elected Bowdoin by a vote of 18 to 10 in the Senate.

== Results ==
Massachusetts gubernatorial election, 1785
Party	Candidate	Votes	%
Nonpartisan	James Bowdoin	3,510	44.07%
Nonpartisan	Thomas Cushing (incumbent)	3,005	37.73%
Nonpartisan	Benjamin Lincoln	1,152	14.46%
Nonpartisan	Oliver Prescott	298	3.74%
Total votes		7,965	100.00%
Nonpartisan hold			
