= 1860 Massachusetts gubernatorial election =

- November 6, 1860
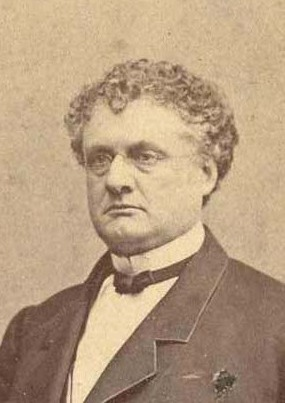

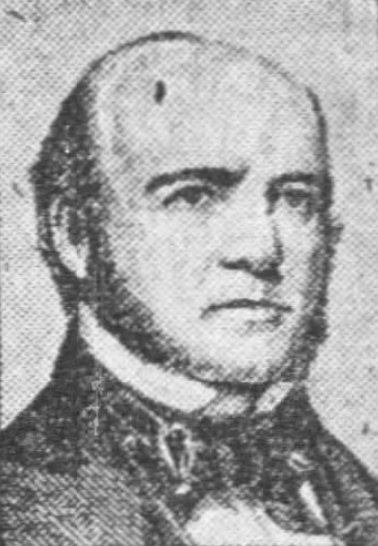

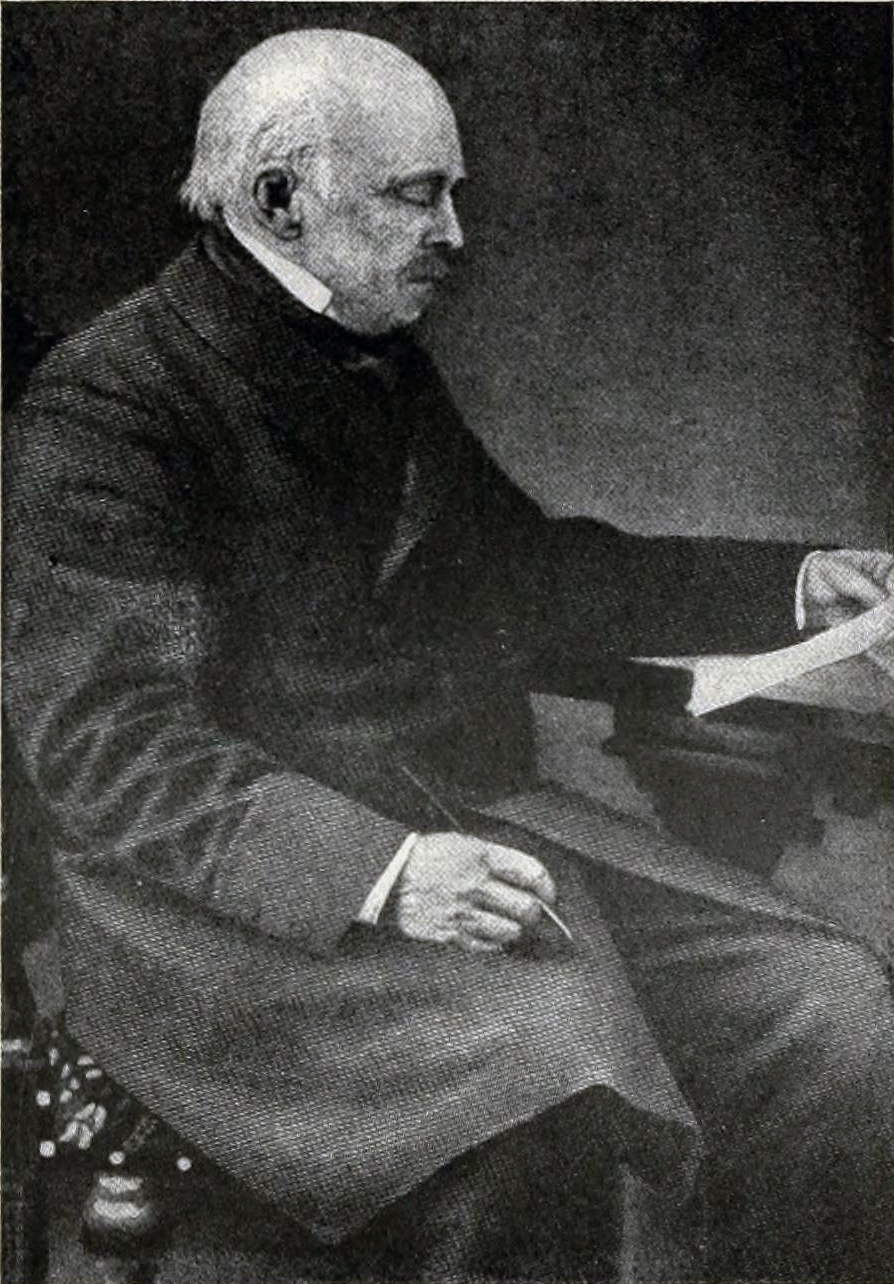
Nominee	John Albion Andrew	Erasmus Beach	Amos Lawrence
Party	Republican	Democratic	Constitutional Union
Popular vote	104,527	35,191	23,816
Percentage	61.63%	20.75%	14.04%
- County results Andrew: 40–50% 50–60% 60–70% 70–80% 80–90%
Governor before election
Nathaniel Prentiss Banks
Republican
Elected Governor
John Albion Andrew
Republican

The 1860 Massachusetts gubernatorial election was held on November 6. Incumbent Republican governor Nathaniel Banks did not run for re-election to a fourth term. He was succeeded by Republican John Albion Andrew, a radical abolitionist.

== Republican convention ==
=== Candidates ===
- John Albion Andrew, state representative from Boston
- Henry L. Dawes, U.S. representative from Pittsfield
- John Z. Goodrich, former U.S. representative from Stockbridge
- Ensign H. Kellogg, former state senator from Pittsfield and speaker of the Massachusetts House of Representatives

=== Campaign ===
Incumbent Governor Nathaniel Banks, a moderate on the slavery issue, supported Congressman Henry L. Dawes as his successor. To give Dawes the greatest possible advantage at the state convention, Banks delayed his retirement announcement as long as possible. However, party chairman William Claflin leaked the news to U.S. Senator Charles Sumner, an abolitionist and supporter of John Albion Andrew. Sumner sprang the Andrew campaign into gear before Banks announced his retirement, allowing them to get the jump on Dawes.

Two additional candidates joined the race: Ensign H. Kellogg and John Z. Goodrich. Both hailed from Berkshire County, like Dawes, and their campaigns may have eaten into his regional support there. By the time the convention opened, Andrew was the strong favorite.

=== Results ===
The Republican State Convention was held in Worcester on August 29.

1860 Massachusetts Republican Convention
Party	Candidate	Votes	%
Republican	John Albion Andrew	733	68.50%
Republican	Henry L. Dawes	326	30.47%
Republican	Ensign Kellogg	7	0.65%
Republican	John Z. Goodrich	4	0.37%
Total votes		1,070	100.00%

== General election ==
=== Candidates ===
- John Albion Andrew, state representative from Boston (Republican)
- Erasmus Beach, Democratic nominee for governor from 1855 through 1858 (Douglas Democratic)
- Benjamin Franklin Butler, state senator from Lowell and Democratic nominee for governor in 1859 (Breckinridge Democratic)
- Amos Adams Lawrence, textile magnate and American Party candidate for governor in 1858 (Constitutional Union)

=== Results ===
1860 Massachusetts gubernatorial election
Party	Candidate	Votes	%	±%
Republican	John Albion Andrew	104,527	61.63%	▲7.61
Democratic	Erasmus Beach	35,191	20.75%	▼11.70
Constitutional Union	Amos Adams Lawrence	23,816	14.04%	New
Southern Democratic	Benjamin Franklin Butler	6,000	3.54%	New
Total votes		169,534	100.00%	
Republican hold		Swing		
