= Joshua Young =

Abolitionist Congregational Unitarian minister

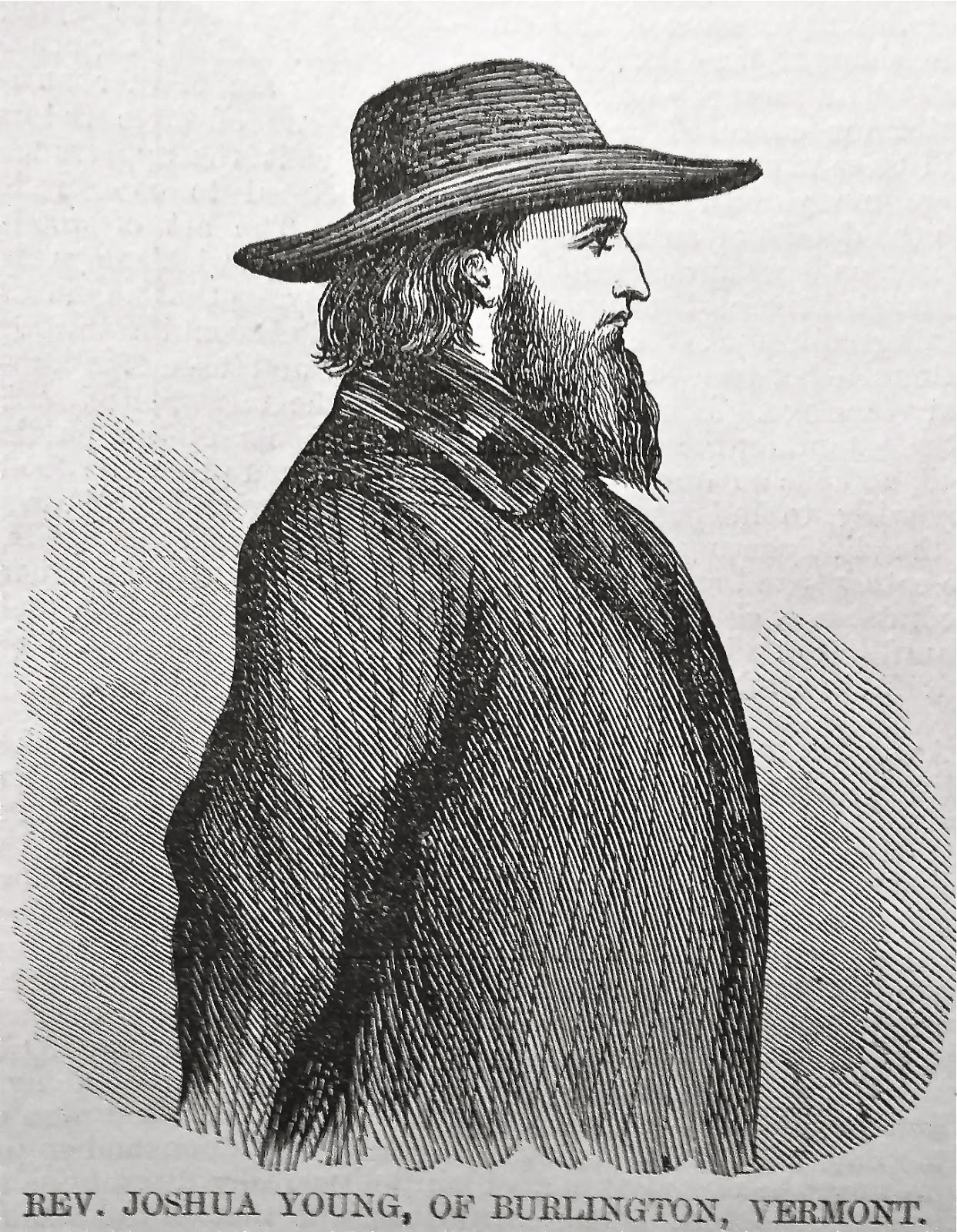
- Rev. Joshua Young, who presided over the funeral of John Brown
- Born: September 23, 1823
- Died: February 7, 1904 (aged 80)
- Occupation: Congregational Unitarian minister
- Years active: 1849–1904
- Known for: Presiding over the funeral of John Brown

Joshua Young (September 23, 1823 – February 7, 1904) was an abolitionist Congregational Unitarian minister who crossed paths with many famous people of the mid-19th century. He received national publicity and lost his pulpit for presiding in 1859 over the funeral of John Brown, the first person executed for treason by a U.S. state. Contrary to his friends' expectations, his resignation under pressure in Burlington did not ruin his career; the church in Burlington later apologized and invited him back to speak as "an honored guest." There is a memorial tablet in the church.

Young was also deaf. Abraham Willard Jackson, a contemporary Unitarian Preacher and deaf man said about Young, "In a Massachusetts village there toils a minister, and for more than a quarter of a century has toiled, though his deafness is so extreme that speech with him is scarcely possible, who once told me that in all these years no unpleasant reminder of his infirmity, either by act or word, had ever come to him from his people... I cannot think I need hesitate to say that my reference here is to Rev. Joshua Young, of Groton. With this testimony before them, all deaf people should pray for the prosperity of his church."

== Life and career ==
Young was born in 1823 in Randolph, near Pittston, Maine, the youngest of eleven children of Aaron Young and Mary Colburn Young. At about age 4 the family moved to Bangor, where he attended local schools. At the age of 16 he entered Bowdoin College, where he was a member of Chi Psi fraternity, graduating Phi Beta Kappa in 1845. He continued his studies at Harvard Divinity School, graduating in 1848. In 1890, he received the honorary degree of Doctor of Divinity from Bowdoin College. He became a Mason and was the chaplain of his local chapter.He described himself as a "Garrisonian abolitionist".

In 1849 he married Mary Elizabeth, the eldest daughter of Sylvanus Plympton, M.D., of Cambridge, Massachusetts. Their children were: Mary Elizabeth Young Stevens (1849–1891), Lucy F. Young (1854–1922), Dr. Joshua Edson Young of Medford, Massachusetts (1856–1940), Henry Guy Young of Winchester, Massachusetts (1865–1936), and Mrs. Grace D. Patton of Bangor, Maine.

He held the following positions as minister:

- 1849–1852 New North Church, Boston.
- 1852–1862 First Congregational (Unitarian) Church, Burlington, Vermont. His salary was $1,000, equivalent to $38,700 in 2025. He was at first very popular, but began to lose popularity when parishioners learned that he had been on the Boston Vigilance Committee and sheltered fugitive slaves in his home. He was also accused by the church of doing the same in Burlington; the charge was not substantiated. In 1858, when he resigned his pulpit at the Burlington church, the church held a meeting to persuade him to withdraw his resignation, which he did. He was also Superintendent of Common Schools in Burlington. He resigned these positions in 1862. There followed a year in Deerfield [Massachusetts].
- 1864–1868 3rd Congregational Society, Hingham, Massachusetts. One source says his salary was $1,200 (equivalent to $24,702 in 2025), another $1,500 (equivalent to $30,878 in 2025). Between this position and the following one in Fall River he travelled to Egypt, the Holy Land, and Europe.
- 1868–1875 Unitarian Church, Fall River, Massachusetts.
- 1875–1904 First Parish Meeting House, Groton, Massachusetts.

Young died in 1904 in Winchester, Massachusetts, at the home of his son.

== Young and slavery ==
Young described himself as "bred in the Garrisonian school of abolitionists". His graduate school and his first call to the pulpit were in Boston, center of the American abolitionist movement and where Wm. Lloyd Garrison's newspaper The Liberator was published. Young was a member of the Boston Vigilance Committee, set up after passage of the Fugitive Slave Law of 1850 to help fugitives avoid slave catchers. He saw the forced and public return of fugitive Anthony Burns to slavery, and gave a sermon on it, published as a pamphlet.

Young was also "a station-keeper on the Underground Railroad when the blow at Harper's Ferry shook the whole nation like an earthquake". He frequently sheltered fugitives himself. In Burlington he was less than 50 miles (80 km) from the Canadian border. One account says that he sheltered up to six fugitives at a time in his "comfortable" barn. Another source says that about 1850 fugitives appeared daily, and sometimes more than one a day, but then dropped to two or three a fortnight.

== The John Brown funeral ==
The most significant event of Young's life, in his own judgment, was his participation in the funeral of abolitionist John Brown, the consequences of which participation surprised and pained him. He often spoke about it and, as an old man, he wrote up his experience at length.

Brown was executed by the Commonwealth of Virginia on December 2, 1859, after his conviction for murder, treason, and inciting a slave insurrection. Young had never met Brown, but when his abolitionist friend Lucius G. Bigelow informed him that John Brown's body was passing through Rutland en route to be buried at his home in North Elba, New York, only 100 miles (160 km) away across Lake Champlain, they decided to attend. They traveled all night and arrived only hours before the service began. As he was the only minister present (others had declined), when Wendell Phillips asked him to preside, he said that he then "knew why God had sent [him] there". The reporter present, who took it down "phonographically" (stenographically), called Young's impromptu opening prayer "impressive". As the body was being lowered into the grave he felt moved to recite words of the apostle Paul: "I have fought a good fight. I have finished my course. I have kept the faith" (2 Timothy 4:7).

When he returned to Burlington, he found himself savagely attacked in the local paper. He was socially ostracized and snubbed and prominent members of his church resigned. Young said he was the victim of persecution.

Honorable men there were who suggested it would be a spectacle not for tears to see me dangling at the end of a rope from the highest tree on the common, swinging and twisting in the wind.

He was told that he would never again be permitted to occupy a pulpit.

In a 2016 sermon on Young, Rev. Karen G. Johnston says, without explanation, "that there is dispute between Young's account, and that of the Burlington church, about what led to his leaving."

== Reburials in 1899 ==
Young presided over the 1899 ceremony in which ten of Brown's men, which had been buried elsewhere, eight of them thrown into two packing crates, were reburied next to John Brown's grave.

== Publications ==
- Young, Joshua (June 11, 1854). God Greater than Man.—A Sermon Preached June 11th, after the Rendition of Anthony Burns, by Joshua Young, Minister of the First Congregational Church, Burlington, Vt. Burlington, Vermont: Samuel B. Nichols.
- Young, Joshua (November 26, 1854). Come and see! What It Is to be a Unitarian. A Discourse delivered in Burlington, Vermont, November 26, 1854, with an Appendix, by Joshua Young, Minister of the First Congregational Church. Burlington, Vermont: Samuel B. Nichols.
- Young, Joshua; Miller, W. A. (March 11, 1859) [March 1, 1859]. "Report of the town superintendants of common schools, for the year ending March 1, 1859". p. 1 – via Chronicling America.
- Young, Joshua (1859). Man Better than a Sheep. A Sermon Preached Thanksgiving day, Nov. 24, 1859, by Joshua Young, Minister of the Unitarian Church, Burlington, Vt. : Published by request. Burlington, Vermont: E. A. Fuller, Bookseller and Stationer.
- Young, Joshua (November 1865). "To the Worshipful Masters, Wardens, and Brothers of Si. Mary's Lodge, A.F. and A.M., St. Mary's, Georgia. Old Colony Lodge of Hingham, Mass., sends greeting". Moore's Freemason's Magazine.
- Young, Joshua (February 11, 1872). The Tree Is Known by its Fruit. A Sermon Preached Feb. 11, 1872, in the Unitarian Church, Fall River. Fall River, Massachusetts.
- Young, Joshua (1889). "Progress of the Country during the Century". Centennial anniversary of Washington's inauguration. Proceedings in the First Parish Meeting-house, at Groton, Massachusetts, April 30, 1889. Groton, Massachusetts: University Press. pp. 17–23.
- Young, Joshua (December 9, 1892). One hundred years of Old Colony Lodge A.F. and A.M. : Centennial celebration, Higham, Dec. 9, 1892. Hingham, Massachusetts: Old Colony Lodge.
- Young, Joshua (January 25, 1902). Address at the Funeral of Mrs. Charlotte Augusta Langdon Sibley: of Groton, Mass., Jan. 25, 1902, by her pastor, Rev. Joshua Young, D.D. Groton, Massachusetts: E.A. Fuller.
- Young, Joshua (March 8, 1902). Letter of resignation of Rev. Joshua Young, D.D. : of the First Parish Church in Groton, Massachusetts, March 8, 1902.
- Young, Joshua (April 1904). "The Funeral of John Brown". New England Magazine: 229–243.

== Legacy ==
- Folk singer Pete Sutherland based a 1997 song, "A Crown of Righteousness”, on a sermon by Young.
- In 2012, lines from Young's 1854 sermon “Come and See What It Is to Be a Unitarian" were used for responsive reading by Young's final parish, the First Parish Church of Groton.
