= 1858 Massachusetts gubernatorial election =

- November 2, 1858
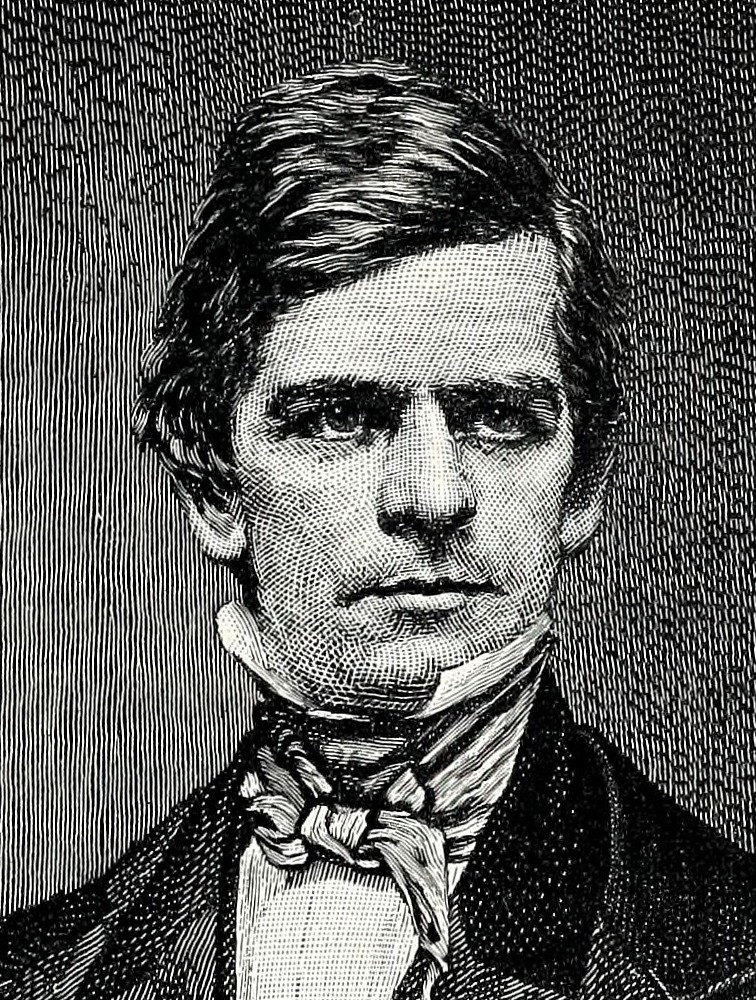

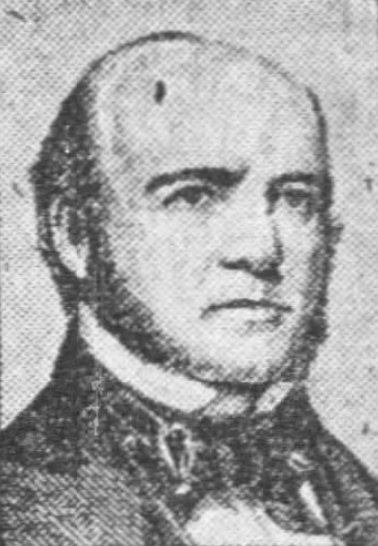

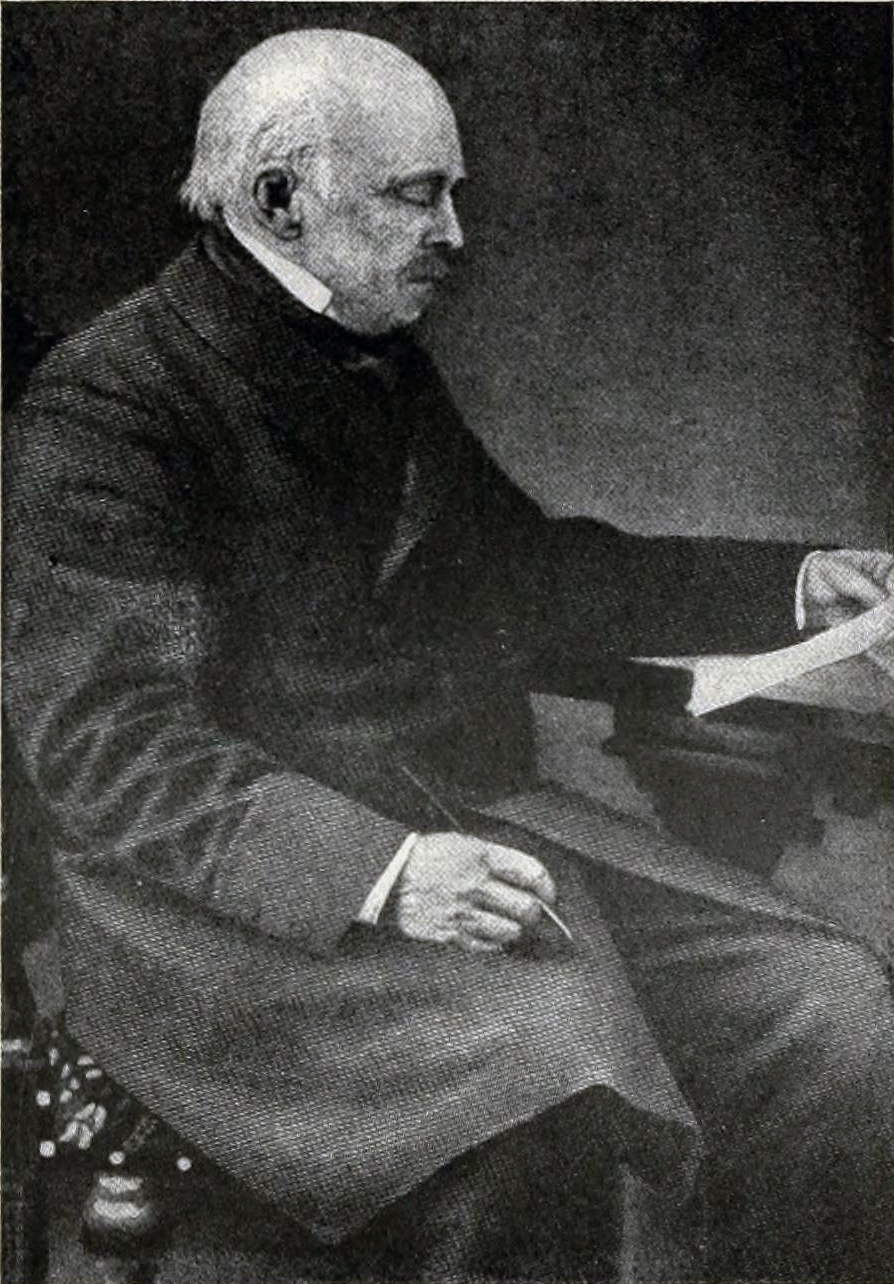
Nominee	Nathaniel Banks	Erasmus Beach	Amos Lawrence
Party	Republican	Democratic	Know Nothing
Popular vote	68,700	38,298	12,084
Percentage	57.61%	32.12%	10.13%
- County results Banks: 40–50% 50–60% 60–70% 70–80%
Governor before election
Nathaniel Prentiss Banks
Republican
Elected Governor
Nathaniel Prentiss Banks
Republican

The 1858 Massachusetts gubernatorial election was held on November 2. Incumbent Republican governor Nathaniel Banks was easily re-elected to a second term in office, beginning a period of Republican dominance which would extend into the 1870s.

== General election ==
=== Candidates ===
- Nathaniel Prentiss Banks, incumbent governor (Republican)
- Erasmus Beach, nominee for governor in 1855, 1856, and 1857 (Democratic)
- Amos Adams Lawrence, businessman and textile magnate (American)

=== Results ===
1858 Massachusetts gubernatorial election
Party	Candidate	Votes	%	±%
Republican	Nathaniel Prentiss Banks (incumbent)	68,700	57.61	▲11.03
Democratic	Erasmus D. Beach	38,298	32.12	▲7.79
Know Nothing	Amos Adams Lawrence	12,084	10.13	▼18.68
Total votes		119,082	100.00	
Republican hold		Swing		

== See also ==
- 1858 Massachusetts legislature
