= William Appleton Lawrence =

American bishop

The Right Reverend William Appleton Lawrence D.D., L.H.D, S.T.D.
- Bishop of Western Massachusetts
- Church: Episcopal Church
- Diocese: Western Massachusetts
- Elected: October 21, 1936
- In office: 1937–1957
- Predecessor: Thomas Frederick Davies Jr.
- Successor: Robert McConnell Hatch

Orders
- Ordination: 1915 by William Lawrence
- Consecration: January 13, 1937 by William Lawrence

Personal details
- Born: May 21, 1889 Philadelphia, Pennsylvania, United States
- Died: December 21, 1968 (aged 79) Cambridge, Massachusetts, United States
- Denomination: Anglican
- Parents: William Lawrence & Julia Cunningham
- Spouse: Hannah Wheelwright Cobb (m. June 1, 1912)
- Children: 7

William Appleton Lawrence (May 21, 1889 - December 21, 1968) was the third bishop of the Episcopal Diocese of Western Massachusetts (1937–57). His father, William Lawrence, was the seventh Bishop of the Episcopal Diocese of Massachusetts (1893–1927).

== Early life and family ==
Lawrence was born on May 21, 1889, in Cambridge, Massachusetts, the son of the Bishop of Massachusetts William Lawrence and Julia Cunningham. He was the grandson of the notable abolitionist Amos Adams Lawrence and a member of an influential "Boston Brahmin" family, founded by his great-great-grandfather and American revolutionary Samuel Lawrence. His great-grandfather was the noted philanthropist Amos Lawrence. Lawrence's brother, Frederic C. Lawrence, was suffragan bishop of the Episcopal Diocese of Massachusetts (1956–68).

== Education and career ==
Lawrence graduated from Harvard College, as was the tradition in his family. He attended the Union Theological Seminary and the Episcopal Theological Seminary. He also studied at Lawrence College in Appleton, Wisconsin from where he graduated with a Doctor of Divinity in 1929.

== Priest ==
Lawrence was ordained by his father, deacon on June 7, 1914, and priest in 1915. He was curate of Grace Church in Lawrence, Massachusetts until 1916 when he became rector of St Stephen's Church in Lynn, Massachusetts. In 1926 he went to Providence, Rhode Island to become rector of Grace Church.

== Bishop ==
On October 21, 1936, Lawrence was elected as the third bishop to the Diocese of Western Massachusetts. He was consecrated on January 13, 1937, by his father Bishop William Lawrence and the Presiding Bishop James De Wolf Perry. In 1938, Lawrence created the first diocesan council and recommended that lay employees be included under social security. Then, in 1946, he established Camp Bement, which was closed by the diocese in 2009. In his retirement, Lawrence developed what is known today as the Clergy Deployment Office. He was also active in civil rights, ecumenical and world peace causes. Lawrence retired in 1957. He died on December 21, 1968.

Episcopal Church (USA) titles
Preceded by Thomas F. Davies	3rd Bishop of Western Massachusetts; 1937 – 1957	Succeeded by Robert McConnell Hatch
