= Frank Bigelow Tarbell =

American art historian

Frank Bigelow Tarbell (January 1, 1853 – December 4, 1920) was a professor of Classical Studies at the University of Chicago from 1893 until 1918. He was also an associate professor of Greek at that institution. A historian and archeologist, Tarbell published numerous books related to his field.

== Biography ==
Born in Groton, Massachusetts, Tarbell graduated from Lawrence Academy at Groton at the age of 16. He was graduated in 1873 from Yale College, where he was a member of the secret society Skull and Bones. He spent two years in Europe before returning to Yale, where he received his doctorate in 1879.

From 1876 until 1887, he taught at Yale, beginning as first tutor in Greek, then assistant professor of Greek, and finally instructor in logic.

From 1888 until 1889, he was director of the American School of Classical Studies at Athens. He returned to the United States to teach Greek at Harvard College, remaining there from 1889 until 1892. Tarbell returned to the American School of Classical Studies to serve as secretary from 1892 until 1893.

He joined the faculty of the new University of Chicago, first as associate professor of Greek from 1893 until 1894, then as professor of archeology until 1918, when he retired. He never married. Professor Tarbell was one of the faculty members chosen to lay the cornerstone for the University of Chicago Classics building on June 9, 1914.

He died following an operation in New Haven, Connecticut.

== Legacy and honors ==
He published numerous works in his fields of history and archaeology.

== Bibliography ==
- The decrees of the Demotionidai: A study of the Attic phratry (1889)
- A History of Greek Art (1896)
- Catalogue of Bronzes, Etc., in Field Museum of Natural History (1909)
- The decrees of the Demotionidai: A study of the Attic phratry (1889)
- The form of the chlamys (1906)
- Illustrated catalogue of carbon prints on the rise and progress of Greek and Roman art (1899)
- The rise and progress of Greek and Roman art (1901)
- A signed proto-Corinthian lecythus: In the Boston Museum of Fine Arts (Revue archeÌologique) (1902)
- Three Etruscan painted sarcophagi (unknown)
