= Samuel Lawrence (revolutionary) =

American revolutionary

Samuel Lawrence (April 24, 1754 – April 17, 1827) was an American revolutionary from Groton, Massachusetts.

== Career ==
Lawrence fought at the Battle of Bunker Hill under Henry Farwell. Lawrence served in the army for 3 and half years from 1775 to 1778, and rose within the U.S. Army to the rank of major. While in the army he married Susanna Parker on July 22, 1777. He was adjutant under General John Sullivan in the Battle of Rhode Island and served there until he retired from service in 1778. After the war, Lawrence returned to Groton, where he settled as a farmer.

In 1793, he helped to found Groton Academy (now Lawrence Academy at Groton).

== Personal life ==
Of English ancestry, Lawrence was born in 1754 in Groton, then in the Province of Massachusetts Bay, to Amos and Abigail (née Abbott) Lawrence. He was the patriarch of the Boston Brahmin Lawrence family. He married Susanna Parker in 1777, and had 9 children. His sons, who were all influential in United States history, included:

- Luther Lawrence (1778–1839), who served as Mayor of Lowell, MA from 1838 to 1839.
- William Lawrence (1783–1848)
- Amos Lawrence (1786–1852)
- Abbott Lawrence (1792–1855)
- Samuel Lawrence (b. 1801), who was a business partner with his brother William

Luther died on April 17, 1839, when he fell into a wheel pit while showing a visitor around his mill.

== See also ==
- Amos Adams Lawrence (grandson)
