= Charles E. Forbes =

American judge (1795–1881)

Charles Edward Forbes (August 25, 1795 – February 13, 1881) was a justice of the Massachusetts Supreme Judicial Court in 1848. He was appointed by Governor George N. Briggs.

Born in West Bridgewater, Massachusetts, Forbes graduated from Brown University in 1815. He was admitted to the bar in 1818. He was appointed to the Massachusetts Supreme Judicial Court in 1848, and resigned a year later.

Forbes was a Mason and Master of the Lodge in 1819 and 1822. He served as a trustee of the Northampton Insane asylum.

He died in Northampton, Massachusetts on February 13, 1881. In his will, he bequeathed $220,000 to the town of Northampton for construction, maintenance, and supply of a public library, with the condition that "no minister of religion is to have anything to do with the management of the institution". The Forbes Library opened in 1894, thirteen years after Forbes' death.

Political offices
| Preceded by Theron Metcalf | Justice of the Massachusetts Supreme Judicial Court; 1848–1848 | Succeeded by Richard Fletcher |
