= Abbott Lawrence =

American industrialist and politician (1792–1855)

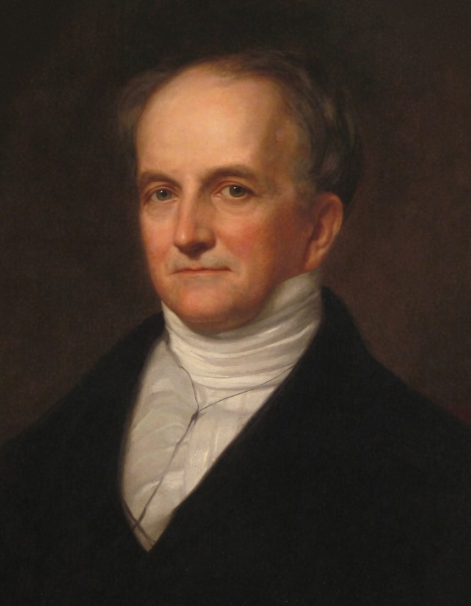
- Posthumous portrait by George Peter Alexander Healy, c. 1860

United States Minister to the United Kingdom
- In office October 20, 1849 – October 12, 1852
- President: Zachary Taylor; Millard Fillmore
- Preceded by: George Bancroft
- Succeeded by: Joseph R. Ingersoll

Member of the U.S. House of Representatives from Massachusetts's 1st district
- In office March 4, 1839 – September 18, 1840
- Preceded by: Richard Fletcher
- Succeeded by: Robert Charles Winthrop
- In office March 4, 1835 – March 3, 1837
- Preceded by: Benjamin Gorham
- Succeeded by: Richard Fletcher

Personal details
- Born: December 16, 1792 Groton, Massachusetts, U.S.
- Died: August 18, 1855 (aged 62) Boston, Massachusetts, U.S.
- Resting place: Mount Auburn Cemetery
- Party: National Republican; Whig
- Spouse: Katherine Bigelow (m. 1819)
- Relations: Samuel Lawrence (father); Amos Lawrence (brother); Amos Adams Lawrence (nephew)
- Children: 1
- Education: Groton Academy
- Profession: Politician; merchant

Abbott Lawrence (December 16, 1792 – August 18, 1855) was an American businessman, politician, and philanthropist. He was among the group of industrialists who founded a settlement on the Merrimack River that would later be named for him, Lawrence, Massachusetts.

== Early life and education ==
Lawrence was born on December 16, 1792, in Groton, Massachusetts, the son of American Revolutionary War officer Samuel Lawrence. He attended Groton Academy, now known as the Lawrence Academy, in Groton.

== Career ==
Upon his graduation in 1808, Lawrence became an apprentice to his brother, Amos, as chief clerk in his brother's firm. On the conclusion of his apprenticeship, in 1814, the Lawrences formed a partnership, specializing in imports from Britain and China, and later expanded their interests to textile manufacturing. Initially called A. & A. Lawrence, the firm later was named A. & A. Lawrence and Co. It continued until Amos's death, and became the greatest wholesale mercantile house in the United States. It was successful even in the hard times of 1812–1815. In 1818, A. &. A Lawrence purchased 50 shares of the Suffolk Bank, a clearinghouse bank on State Street in Boston.

The firm did much for the establishment of the cotton textile industry in New England. In 1830, it came to the aid of financially distressed mills of Lowell, Massachusetts. In that year, the Suffolk, Tremont and Lawrence companies were established in Lowell, and Luther Lawrence, the eldest brother, represented the firm's interests there. When Amos retired from the business in 1831 due to ill health, Abbott became head of the firm. In 1845–1847, the firm established and built up Lawrence, Massachusetts, named in honour of Abbott, who was a director of the Essex Company, which controlled the water power of Lawrence, and later was president of the Atlantic Cotton Mills and Pacific Mill] there. The Lawrence brothers were among the founders of New England's influential textile industry.

In 1819, Abbott Lawrence married Katherine Bigelow, the daughter of Timothy Bigelow and sister of John P. Bigelow. Their daughter, Katherine Bigelow Lawrence, married Augustus Lowell on June 1, 1854.

In the 1820s, Lawrence became a prominent public figure, including as a vocal supporter of railroad construction for economic benefit. He was an ardent protectionist, and represented Massachusetts at the Harrisburg protectionist convention in 1827. Lawrence was highly influential among Massachusetts Whigs. In 1834, he was elected US Representative as a Whig, serving in the 24th Congress. He did not seek re-election in 1836, but was elected again in 1838, serving in the 26th Congress. In 1840, he took an active part in the successful presidential campaign of William Henry Harrison. In 1842, he was appointed commissioner to settle the Northeastern Boundary Dispute between Canada and the United States. In 1844, he supported the campaign of Henry Clay and was a presidential elector. Lawrence was elected a member of the American Antiquarian Society in 1846, and subsequently was also elected a Fellow of the American Academy of Arts and Sciences in 1847.

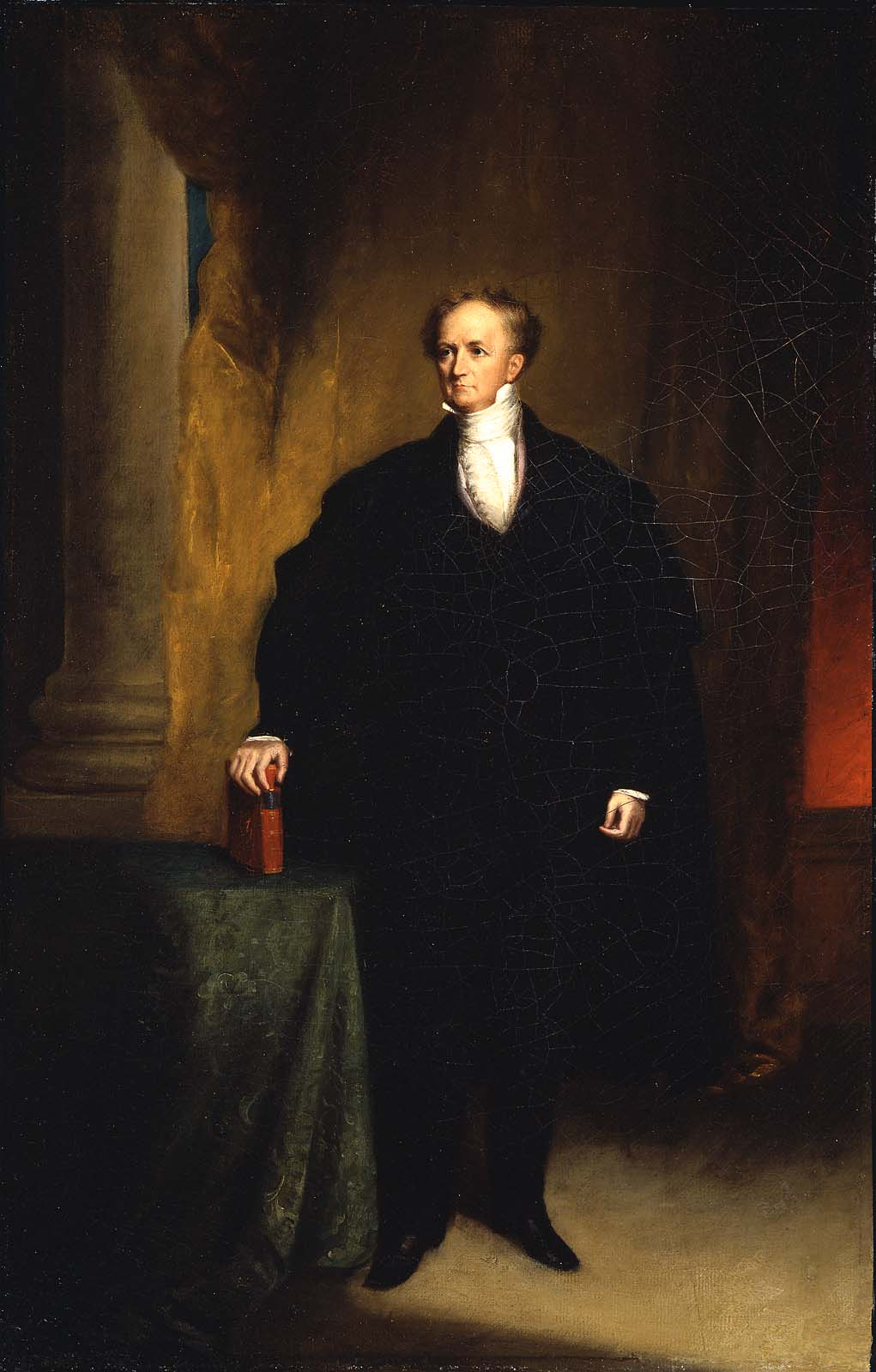
Portrait by Chester Harding, c. 1842

In 1848, Lawrence was an unsuccessful candidate for party nomination as vice president on the Whig ticket, headed by Zachary Taylor. After Taylor's presidential victory, he offered Lawrence a choice of positions in the administration. Lawrence rejected a cabinet appointment, and chose the post of minister to Great Britain. He was involved in the negotiations of the Clayton–Bulwer Treaty, and resigned in October 1852. He returned to the United States to join the 1852 presidential campaign of Gen. Winfield Scott. However, he grew dissatisfied with the Whig stand on slavery, and abandoned the party.

Lawrence was active in Boston's Unitarian Church and donated money to various causes. He supported Lawrence Academy, affordable housing in Boston, and the Boston Public Library. He also provided $50,000 to establish the Lawrence Scientific School at Harvard College, and provided a similar sum in his will for the School. He died in Boston on August 18, 1855, aged 62, and was interred in Mount Auburn Cemetery, Cambridge, Massachusetts.

His differenced coat of arms, Argent, a cross raguly gules, on a chief gules a leopard or, became well-known though its 1887 publication as the second of three frontispiece illustrations in American Heraldica, with explication of the original family coat of arms, Argent, a cross raguly gules, on a chief gules three leopard heads or, within the tome on page 33.

== Notes ==
U.S. House of Representatives
Preceded by Benjamin Gorham	Member of the U.S. House of Representatives from Massachusetts's 1st congressional district 1835–1837	Succeeded by Richard Fletcher
Preceded by Richard Fletcher	Member of the U.S. House of Representatives from Massachusetts's 1st congressional district 1839–1841	Succeeded by Robert C. Winthrop
Diplomatic posts
Preceded by George Bancroft	United States Minister to Britain; 1849–1852	Succeeded by Joseph R. Ingersoll
