= Lawrence Academy (Groton, Massachusetts) =

Private school in Massachusetts, US

Location
- 26 Powderhouse Road; Groton, Massachusetts 01450; United States; 42°36′14″N 71°33′58″W

Information
- Motto: Omnibus lucet (Let light shine upon all)
- Established: 1793; 233 years ago
- Head of School: Dan Scheibe
- Faculty: ~80
- Enrollment: 400
- Campus type: Exurban
- Colors: Red and blue
- Nickname: Spartans
- Rivals: Tabor Academy, Groton School (Unofficial)
- Website: www.lacademy.edu

Lawrence Academy at Groton is a private, nonsectarian, co-educational college-preparatory boarding school located in Groton, Massachusetts. Founded in 1792 as Groton Academy and chartered in 1793 by Governor John Hancock, it is the tenth-oldest boarding school in the United States and the third-oldest in Massachusetts, following The Governor's Academy (1763) and Phillips Academy at Andover (1778).

== History ==
=== Early center of learning ===
On April 27, 1792, fifty residents of the towns of Groton and Pepperell formed an association to raise funds for a "Publick School ... in Groton, for the education of youth, of both sexes—in which School are taught the English, Latin and Greek Languages, Writing, Arithmetic, Geography, the Art of Speaking and Writing, with Practical Geometry, and Logic." The founders of the new Groton Academy included prominent citizens Oliver Prescott, Zabdiel Adams, Samuel Dana, and Timothy Bigelow. Samuel Lawrence also contributed funds, thus beginning the school's longstanding relationship with the Lawrence family.

The academy is the third-oldest boarding school in Massachusetts. It received its corporate charter in 1793 and a state-funded endowment (11,520 acres of land in Maine) in 1797. Its primary purpose was to educate students from the surrounding region; at the time, Groton was the second-largest town in Middlesex County and the center of the local economy. Although some students came from as far away as North Carolina, the school remained committed to its local base. From 1793 to 1848, thirteen families supplied one out of every six students.

In the days before compulsory education, enrollment was unstable and only a small portion of students attended college. Schoolmasters rarely stayed for longer than two years; the first (Samuel Holyoke) stayed for less than a year. Even so, Groton Academy developed a strong reputation. Between 1801 and 1870, it sent approximately fifty students to Harvard College, making it one of Harvard's top twelve feeder schools. Turnover at the top meant that several notable individuals taught at Groton Academy after graduating from college, including Asahel Stearns, the co-founder of Harvard Law School, and William Merchant Richardson, the future chief justice of the New Hampshire Supreme Court.

Alumni in the early years included James Walker, president of Harvard University; John Prescott Bigelow, mayor of Boston; James Gordon Carter, a pioneer in tax-funded public schools; and Nehemiah Cutter, a co-founder of the American Psychiatric Association. In addition, in 1879, when the academy was already a mature institution, Lawrence Academy admitted its first black graduate, Robert H. Terrell. Terrell would later become the third black graduate of Harvard, the first black honors graduate of Harvard, and the first black federal judge.

=== Lawrence family patronage ===
On February 28, 1846, the Massachusetts legislature granted the Groton Academy board's request to rename the institution to Lawrence Academy at Groton in recognition of the generosity of the children of Samuel Lawrence, all eight of whom had attended the academy.

In 1838, brothers Amos and William Lawrence—by now wealthy Boston merchants and investors—began their lengthy patronage of the academy, when Amos contributed a gift of "books and philosophical apparatus," followed in 1839 by "a telescope and Bowditch's translation of Mécanique Céleste by Laplace," and $2,000 for enlarging the schoolhouse in 1842. In 1844, William donated $10,000 to the endowment "for the advancement of education for all coming time." By 1850, Amos had donated an entire library's worth of books to the academy (2,400 of its 2,650 books). Over the course of their lives, Amos and William Lawrence donated nearly $65,000 in cash, scholarships, and property to the school (around $2.6 million in 2024 dollars). In addition, their brothers Luther and Samuel (the younger) both served as president of the board of trustees.

The Lawrences' funds also helped the academy establish close ties with prominent liberal arts schools, including Williams College, which historically catered to New England's "older provincial elite." The gifts of the Lawrence brothers established twelve scholarships for Lawrence Academy graduates to attend Williams, Bowdoin College in Maine, and Wabash College in Indiana (four each). Franklin Carter, president of Williams College, was the guest speaker at the academy's 90th anniversary celebration in 1883.

=== Modernization ===
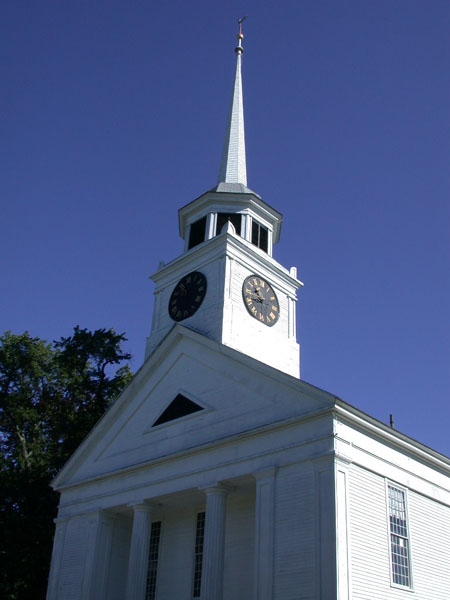
The First Parish Church stands at the northern end of Lawrence Academy's campus, but it is not associated with the school. In 1826, its congregation split between trinitarians and Unitarians. The trinitarians kept control of Lawrence Academy and the Unitarians kept control of the church.

In the middle of the nineteenth century, Lawrence Academy's future was jeopardized by religious disputes. Groton's population was divided between trinitarian Congregationalists (often Evangelicals) and Unitarians, and the Unitarians outnumbered the trinitarians. At the time, Lawrence Academy's board of trustees was heavily Evangelical, and board members suspected that Unitarians in town were trying to deter local students from attending the academy. (Despite the academy's reliance on local students, its charter required "a majority of trustees [to] be non-residents of Groton.") In the 1850s and 1880s, the town of Groton sought to make Lawrence Academy a public high school under town control, but the trustees rejected both proposals. In 1860, the town opened Groton High School, providing the first secular alternative to Lawrence Academy. In addition, in 1884, the now-Episcopalian Lawrence family helped establish Groton School, an Episcopal boarding school, which periodically attempted to convert its neighbor to Anglicanism. Enrollment bottomed out at 26 students in 1889.

In 1899, Lawrence Academy reinvented itself as a traditional college-preparatory boarding school. It raised tuition to $430 (it was $200 fifteen years earlier) and revised the curriculum to focus on college entrance examinations. It stopped admitting girls, and it prioritized boarding students over day students. The school remained formally nonsectarian, but the new principal was the son of an Episcopal priest. Anglicisms such as "Third Form" (freshmen) and "headmaster" (principal) were briefly imported, though later discarded.

During this period, the academy endured a long stretch of financial difficulties and shut down twice. The academy first closed from 1869 to 1871 after its schoolhouse burned down during a Fourth of July celebration; it cost $24,000 to replace (nearly $600,000 in 2024). It closed again from 1898 to 1899 while it converted into an all-male high school, at the expense of its first female principal, Kate Mann, hired just one year earlier. Although the academy returned to financial health in the 1940s, the campus burned down again in 1956.

The academy resumed co-education in 1971. Improved fundraising in the 1980s and 1990s, including an $8 million capital campaign, significantly improved the academy's financial health.

Today, Lawrence Academy's student body is both heavily local and heavily international. 58% of students are day students. A quarter of the boarding students (12%) come from abroad. The academy enrolled 424 students in the 2021–22 school year, of whom 306 (72.2%) were white, 49 (11.6%) were Asian, 26 (6.1%) were black, 16 (3.8%) were Hispanic, 1 (0.2%) was Native American, 1 (0.2%) was Native Hawaiian/Pacific Islander, and 25 (6.0%) were multiracial; the national survey in question required each student to choose only one category.

== Athletics ==
Lawrence Academy's athletic teams compete in the Independent School League. The academy has educated many notable athletes.

=== Ice hockey ===
- Laurie Baker, 1998 Olympic gold medalist; 1992 silver medalist
- Jim Campbell
- Greg Crozier, two-time NCAA champion
- Doug Friedman
- Steve Heinze, played on the 1992 U.S. Olympic team
- Vic Heyliger, head coach at the University of Michigan; six-time NCAA champion in 1948, 1951, 1952, 1953, 1955, 1956 (most all-time); U.S. Hockey Hall of Fame inductee
- David Jensen, played on the 1984 U.S. Olympic team
- Rand Pecknold, head coach at Quinnipiac University; NCAA champion in 2023
- Jeff Serowik
- Sam Colangelo, current forward for the Anaheim Ducks

=== Basketball ===
- Shabazz Napier, two-time NCAA champion
- Richard Roby
- Antoine Wright

=== Other ===
- Jonah Bayliss (baseball)
- Tyler Beede (baseball)
- Guillermo Cantú (soccer)
- A. J. Dillon (football)
- Ryan Puglisi (football)
- Luke Reynolds (football)
- Cynthia Ryder (rowing)

== Notable alumni ==
- Tim Armstrong — class of 1989, chairman and CEO of AOL
- William Bancroft — 1st president of the Boston Elevated Railway, member of Massachusetts House of Representatives and mayor of Cambridge, Massachusetts
- Charles Beecher — minister, composer of hymns, and author
- Henry Adams Bullard — U.S. Representative from Louisiana 1831-1834 and 1850–1851
- Richard Burgin — author, editor of Boulevard
- Karyn Bryant — television personality; MTV VJ, CNN anchor
- Bruce Crane — president and chairman of Crane & Co.; member of the Massachusetts Governor's Council
- James Dana — 5th mayor of Charlestown, Massachusetts
- Rhoda A. Esmond - philanthropist, temperance leader
- Eric Gaskins — fashion designer based in New York City
- Samuel Abbott Green — physician, librarian, historian, and 28th Mayor of Boston
- Donald L. Harlow — Chief Master Sergeant of the Air Force
- Edward D. Hayden — U.S. Representative from Massachusetts
- Frederick "Moose" Heyliger — World War II paratrooper featured in Band of Brothers
- Chase Hoyt — film, television, and stage actor
- Amos Kendall — 8th Postmaster General and founder of Gallaudet College for the deaf
- Abbott Lawrence — Member of Congress, Minister to Great Britain, founder of Harvard University's Division of Engineering and Applied Sciences
- Amos Adams Lawrence — abolitionist, politician, founder of the University of Kansas and Lawrence University
- Amos Lawrence — industrialist; philanthropist
- Charles H. Mansur — member of the U.S. House of Representatives from Missouri
- Cat Marnell — writer
- Julie Mason — newspaper and radio journalist
- Page McConnell — Phish musician
- Albert E. Pillsbury — President of the Massachusetts State Senate and Massachusetts Attorney General
- George Putnam — Unitarian minister, Massachusetts state legislator, and Transcendentalist
- William Adams Richardson — 29th Secretary of the Treasury and Chief Justice of the United States Court of Claims
- Maria Rodale — publisher; chairman and CEO of Rodale, Inc.
- Ether Shepley — politician; Senator from Maine from 1833 to 1835, Chief Justice of the Maine Supreme Judicial Court 1848–1855
- Jim Sokolove — television attorney
- Huntley N. Spaulding — philanthropist; Governor of New Hampshire from 1927 to 1929
- Charles Warren Stone — politician; Congressman and Lieutenant Governor from Pennsylvania
- Frank Bigelow Tarbell — historian, archeologist and professor at University of Chicago
- George Makepeace Towle — lawyer, politician, and author
- Dr. James Walker — Unitarian minister and 21st president of Harvard University
- William B. Washburn — Governor of Massachusetts from 1872 to 1874, U.S. Representative from 1863 to 1871, U.S. Senator from 1874 to 1875
- William Channing Whitney — architect
- William Allan Wilde — publisher; member of the Massachusetts House of Representatives in 1888

== Notable faculty ==
- Samuel Adams Holyoke — first headmaster
- Jason Swepson — football coach
- Paul Zukauskas — football coach
- Michael L. Taylor — football coach and United States Army Special Forces military veteran
- Robert V. Bruce — 1988 winner of the Pulitzer Prize for History
- Brian Feigenbaum — founder of Food Not Bombs
