= Luther Lawrence =

American politician

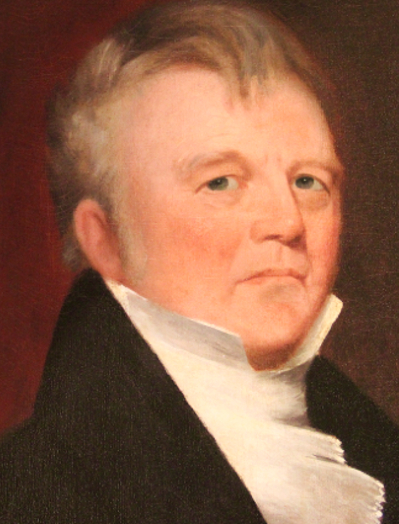
- Portrait c. 19th century

2nd Mayor of Lowell, Massachusetts
- In office 1838 – April 17, 1839
- Preceded by: Elisha Bartlett
- Succeeded by: Elisha Huntington

Member of the Massachusetts House of Representatives
- In office 1830–1830

Speaker of the Massachusetts House of Representatives
- In office 1822–1822
- Preceded by: Josiah Quincy III
- Succeeded by: Levi Lincoln Jr.

Delegate to the Massachusetts Constitutional Convention of 1820
- In office 1820–1820

Member of the Massachusetts House of Representatives
- In office 1812–1822

Personal details
- Born: September 28, 1778 Groton, Massachusetts
- Died: April 17, 1839 (aged 60)
- Party: Federalist Party
- Spouse(s): Lucy Bigelow, m. June 2, 1805
- Education: Groton Academy, Harvard College
- Occupation: Attorney

Luther Lawrence (September 28, 1778 – April 17, 1839) was the Mayor of Lowell, Massachusetts (1838–1839). In 1818, Lawrence purchased 25 shares of the Suffolk Bank, a clearinghouse bank on State Street in Boston.

== Early life and family ==
Lawrence was the son of American Revolutionary, Samuel Lawrence, patriarch of the Lawrence family from Boston. Luther's brothers, William, Abbott, and Amos, all became influential figures in United States history.

== Death ==
Lawrence died on April 17, 1839, when he fell into a wheel pit while showing a visitor around his mill.

Political offices
Preceded by Josiah Quincy III	Speaker of the Massachusetts House of Representatives; 1822	Succeeded by Levi Lincoln Jr.
Preceded by Elisha Bartlett	2nd Mayor of Lowell, Massachusetts; 1838 – April 17, 1839	Succeeded by Elisha Huntington
