= Amos Lawrence =

American merchant and philanthropist

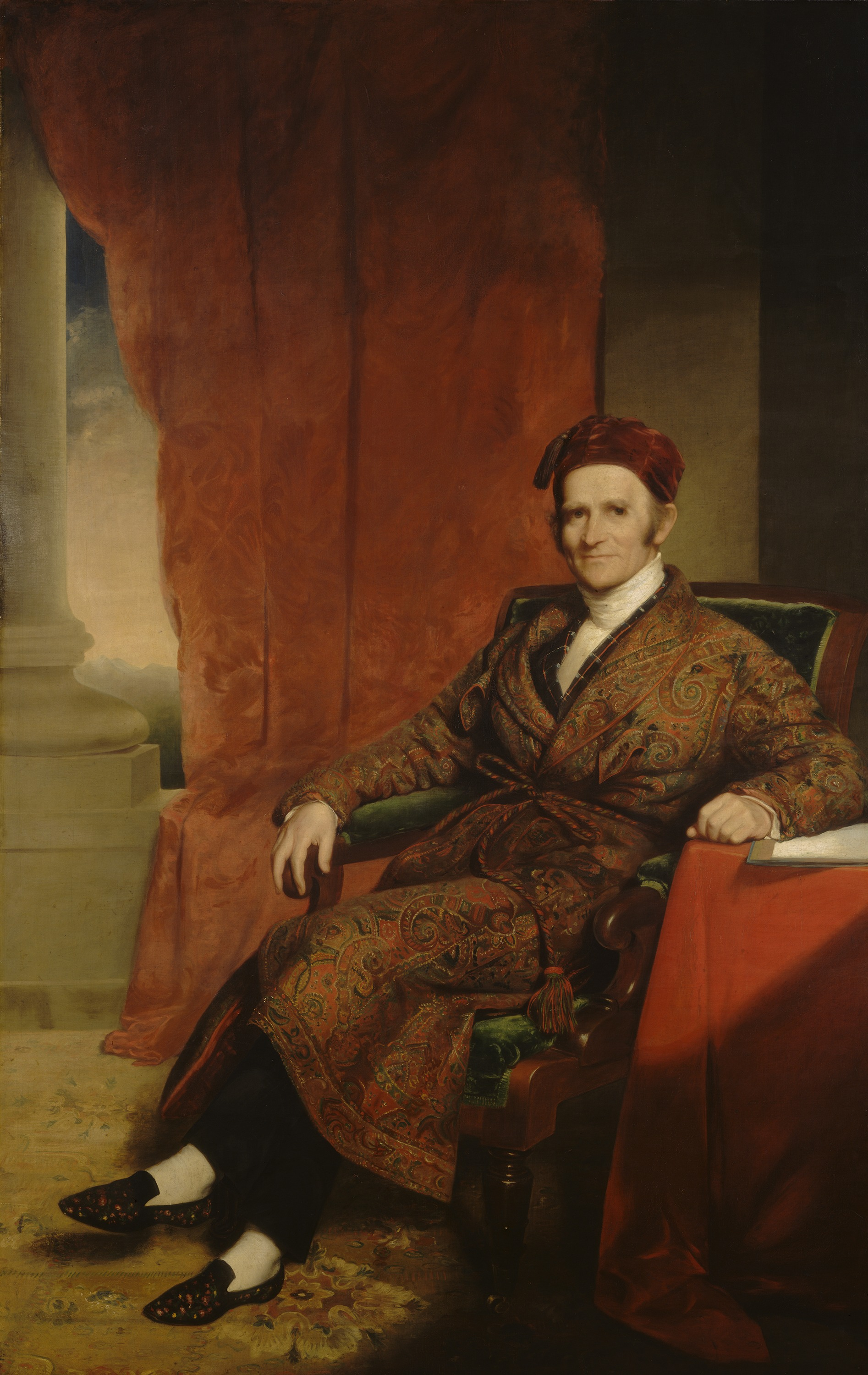
- Born: April 22, 1786; Groton, Massachusetts, U.S.
- Died: December 31, 1852 (aged 66); Boston, Massachusetts, U.S.
- Occupations: merchant, investor, philanthropist
- Known for: Helping to establish the city of Lawrence, Massachusetts and charitable donations
- Spouses: Sarah Richards (m. 1811; died 1819) Nancy Means Ellis (m. 1821)
- Children: 5, including Amos A. Lawrence
- Parent: Samuel Lawrence (father)
- Relatives: Luther Lawrence (brother); Abbott Lawrence (brother); Jane Pierce (niece); Robert Means Lawrence (grandson); William Lawrence (grandson)

Amos Lawrence (April 22, 1786 – December 31, 1852) was an American merchant and philanthropist.

== Biography ==
Amos Lawrence was born in Groton, Massachusetts. Lawrence attended elementary school in Groton and briefly attended the Groton Academy. In 1799, at age 13, Amos Lawrence became a clerk at a country store in Dunstable, Massachusetts, and a few months afterward was promoted to a variety store in Groton. After completing his apprenticeship, in April 1807, Amos went to Boston with $20 of his savings. His employers' business there failed. The creditors appointed Amos to settle the firm's accounts, and after doing that to their satisfaction, he rented a shop on Cornhill and founded a dry-goods establishment on his own account in December. In 1808, his brother Abbott entered his employ as chief clerk, and in 1814 became a partner in the firm, now called A. & A. Lawrence and later A. & A. Lawrence and Co. The firm continued until Amos's death and became the greatest wholesale mercantile house in the United States. It was successful even in the hard times of 1812 to 1815, and afterwards engaged particularly in selling woolen and cotton goods on commission. In 1818, A. & A. Lawrence purchased 50 shares of the Suffolk Bank, a clearinghouse bank on State Street in Boston.

The firm did much for the establishment of the cotton textile industry in New England. In 1830, it came to the aid of the financially distressed mills of Lowell, Massachusetts. In that year, the Suffolk, Tremont, and Lawrence companies were established in Lowell, and Luther Lawrence, the eldest brother, represented the firm's interests there. In 1845–1847, the firm established and built up Lawrence, Massachusetts, named in honor of Abbott Lawrence, a director of the Essex Company, which controlled the water power of Lawrence, and afterwards was president of the Atlantic Cotton Mills and Pacific Mills there.

In 1831, when his health failed, Amos Lawrence retired from active involvement in the firm, where, thereafter, Abbott Lawrence was the head. The later years of Amos's life were mostly spent furthering various philanthropic enterprises. According to his records, from 1829 until his death, Amos Lawrence gave over $639,000 (in 1840s dollars) to charitable causes. In 1842, he decided not to allow his property to increase any further, and in the last eleven years of his life, he spent at least $525,000 in charity. To Williams College, he gave nearly $40,000; to Groton Academy, which later changed its name to Lawrence Academy to honor both Amos and his brother, William, he gave over $20,000; to Wabash College, Kenyon College, and the theological seminary at Bangor, Maine, he also gave sizable sums.

His private donations were numerous, requiring several rooms in his house to coordinate them. Among other things, Amos Lawrence donated libraries to academic institutions, established a children's hospital in Boston, and gave $10,000 to complete the Bunker Hill Monument (Lawrence's father had fought at the Battle of Bunker Hill). He gave to many good causes on a smaller scale, taking especial delight in occasionally giving books from a bundle in his sleigh or carriage as he drove.

Upon his death in Boston in 1852, his fortune was estimated at $14,100,000, roughly $600,000,000 in today's dollars.

== Family ==
Lawrence was the fourth son of Samuel Lawrence and Susanna (née Parker) Lawrence. Samuel Lawrence was a Revolutionary War officer and one of the founders of Groton Academy (now Lawrence Academy at Groton), where Amos was educated. Samuel, in turn, descended from John Lawrence of Wissett in Suffolk, England, one of the first settlers of Groton. Among Amos Lawrence's brothers were Luther Lawrence and Abbott Lawrence. With Abbott Lawrence at its head, the family firm founded Lawrence, Massachusetts.

On June 6, 1811, Lawrence married Sarah Richards. They had three children, including Amos A. Lawrence. After Richards died in 1819, Amos Lawrence married Nancy Means Ellis, widow of former U.S. Representative for New Hampshire and New Hampshire Superior Court justice Caleb Ellis, on April 11, 1821. Lawrence had two more children from his second marriage.

Amos A. Lawrence was the founder of Lawrence, Kansas (thus its name) through his work with the New England Emigrant Aid Company, founded the University of Kansas, and helped found Lawrence University in Appleton, Wisconsin. His son, Bishop William Lawrence, was the longtime Episcopal bishop of Massachusetts.

Jane Pierce, who served as First Lady during her husband's presidency, Franklin Pierce, from 1853 to 1857, was Lawrence’s niece.
