= Oliver Prescott =

American physician

Oliver Prescott (27 April 1731, in Groton, Massachusetts – 17 November 1804, in Groton) was a colonial-era physician, soldier, and judge.

== Biography ==
He graduated from Harvard in 1750, and was distinguished at college for his literary attainments and correct deportment. After which he was apprenticed to Ebenezer Robie of Sudbury, who had been educated in Europe, and a disciple of the renowned Boerhaave, and was an eminent physician. Prescott's worked as a medical doctor in Massachusetts for nearly half a century. He was one of the original members of the Massachusetts Medical Society at its incorporation in 1781. He was president of the Middlesex Medical Society during the period of his existence. and then practiced medicine in Groton. He returned to Harvard to get an M.A. in 1753.

In the Massachusetts militia, Prescott was appointed by the King George III a major, then lieutenant colonel and colonel. In 1776 he was appointed a brigadier general for Middlesex County by the executive council of Massachusetts: he also was in 1776 chosen as a member of the board of war. In 1777 he was elected a member of the Supreme Executive Council, and in 1778 he was appointed the third major general of the militia throughout the Commonwealth. He was elected town clerk of Groton from 1765 to 1777, inclusive (13 years). In 1779 Prescott was appointed to the office of judge of probate for the county of Middlesex, which he retained until his death.

In 1781 he was appointed second major general of the militia but soon tendered his resignation by reason of other important duties. In 1781 Prescott received from the government a commission to "cause to be arrested and committed to jail, any person whom he should deem the safety of the Commonwealth required to be retained of his personal liberty, or whose enlargement within the Commonwealth is dangerous thereto". He with his brother James and Jonathan and Amos Lawrence, and eleven others, were appointed to a committee to determine that the resolves of the continental congress relative to the "Test Oath", so-called, "be faithfully carried into effect".

Prescott was incorporated a Fellow of the American Academy of Arts and Sciences in 1780. Also, one of the trustees of the Groton Academy, and the first president of the board. He was in stature six feet in height, somewhat corpulent, and possessed and ever practiced a peculiar suavity and politeness of manners, and a gentlemanly deportment, which strongly endeared him to the people, always commanding esteem and respect.

He and Lydia Baldwin married in 1756. Three of their seven children died in an epidemic of 1765/6.

From 1779 until his death, he was a judge of probate for Middlesex County. In 1780 he became one of the original fellows of the American Academy of Arts and Sciences, and he was a trustee, patron, and benefactor of Groton Academy.
