= Maurice K. Smith =

New Zealand-born American architect

Maurice Keith Smith (September 1926, Hamilton, New Zealand - December 2020, Harvard, Massachusetts) was a New Zealand-born architect and architectural educator. Smith's work and teaching builds upon the idea of creating "habitable three-dimensional fields" as a working method for his projects. Smith was Emeritus Professor of Architecture at MIT.

== Early life ==
Smith left New Zealand to study at Massachusetts Institute of Technology in the United States on a Fulbright Scholarship in 1952. During this time Smith studied under, and worked for, various MIT faculty and visiting faculty, including Carl Koch, Serge Chermayeff, Richard Buckminster Fuller, and György Kepes.

== Career ==
Back in New Zealand in the mid-1950s, Smith designed a number of buildings, including individual houses in Auckland and the Firth Offices in Hastings, before returning to the US in 1958. There he taught from 1958 to 1996 at the School of Architecture, Massachusetts Institute of Technology. He returned to New Zealand to teach at the Auckland University School of Architecture for one term in 1968.

Smith's notable buildings include:

- the offices of Firth Concrete, Hastings, New Zealand, 1958 (demolished),
- Indian Hill House (Blackman House I) in Groton, Massachusetts (1962–63)
- Blackman House II in Manchester, Massachusetts (1992–93).
