= Pages for Peace =

Pages for Peace is a book created as an after school enrichment program by the Groton-Dunstable Regional Middle School in Groton, Massachusetts. The group created the second largest book in the world (by physical dimensions). The subject of the book they have chosen to create is World Peace. This enrichment program was created by 5th grade teacher Betsy Sawyer. Pages for Peace consists of recollections and reflections on the topic of World Peace from people all over the world.

== History ==
In September 2008 members of Pages for Peace visited the United Nations headquarters in New York City to give a presentation to the annual international youth conference, and have been invited back every year since (as of 2016).

In June 2010, Pages for Peace was awarded the Peace Abbey's "Courage of Conscience" award, which had previously been awarded to Mother Teresa and the Dalai Lama.

The group received the honor of meeting and speaking with the United Nations Secretary-General Ban Ki-moon in 2015, a decade into the project.

In October 2014, Pages for Peace went to the John F. Kennedy Presidential Library and Museum to begin its world tour, and the event even featured a personal video message of the United Nations Secretary-General Ban-Ki Moon.

In the summer of 2022 the book was included in an exhibit in the Fitchburg Art Museum.

== Notable contributors ==
Among the contributors to the Pages for Peace project have been:

- The Dalai Lama
- IAEA Director General Mohamed ElBaradei
- Former United States President Jimmy Carter
- Former South African President Nelson Mandela
- United Nations ambassador Anwarul Chowdhury
- Skateboarder Tony Hawk
- Retired US General Peter Pace

== Size ==
- The Book is 12 feet tall and 20 feet wide open-face.
- The Book contains over 535 double sided pages.
- The Book weighs over a ton.
