= Groton-Dunstable Regional School District =

School district in Massachusetts

District information
- Type: Public
- Motto: Together We Achieve – Our World * Our Communities * Our Schools
- Grades: PK – 12
- Established: 1967
- Superintendent: Geoff Bruno
- Accreditation: NEASC
- Schools: 5

Students and staff
- Students: 2771
- Teachers: 185
- Student–teacher ratio: 16.5:1

Other information
- Website: www.gdrsd.org

Groton-Dunstable Regional School District is a school district in the US state of Massachusetts which serves the towns of Groton and Dunstable.

== History ==
=== Old Groton School District ===
By the 1750s Groton had been providing public schooling to its children and adults. There are records of funding provided in 1758 for both "reading and writing schools" in the outer areas of town and a grammar school in the town center. The district 2 school, which was to become the Moors school, was built in 1789. Several new schoolhouses were built on the sites of older ones in 1792.

By 1805, the town of Groton already had a school committee and twelve district public schools. School committee records from that time put an emphasis on Bible readings, spelling, arithmetic, and grammar as taught from a common set of district preferred texts. Together in 1806, those schools served a population of 52 students. The grammar school migrated between the district schools and in 1808 was kept for four months in District school number 1, then two months in number 2, two months in number 3, and two months in number five. In 1823 and 1828, districts 10 and 1 each split, forming new sub-districts within the town.

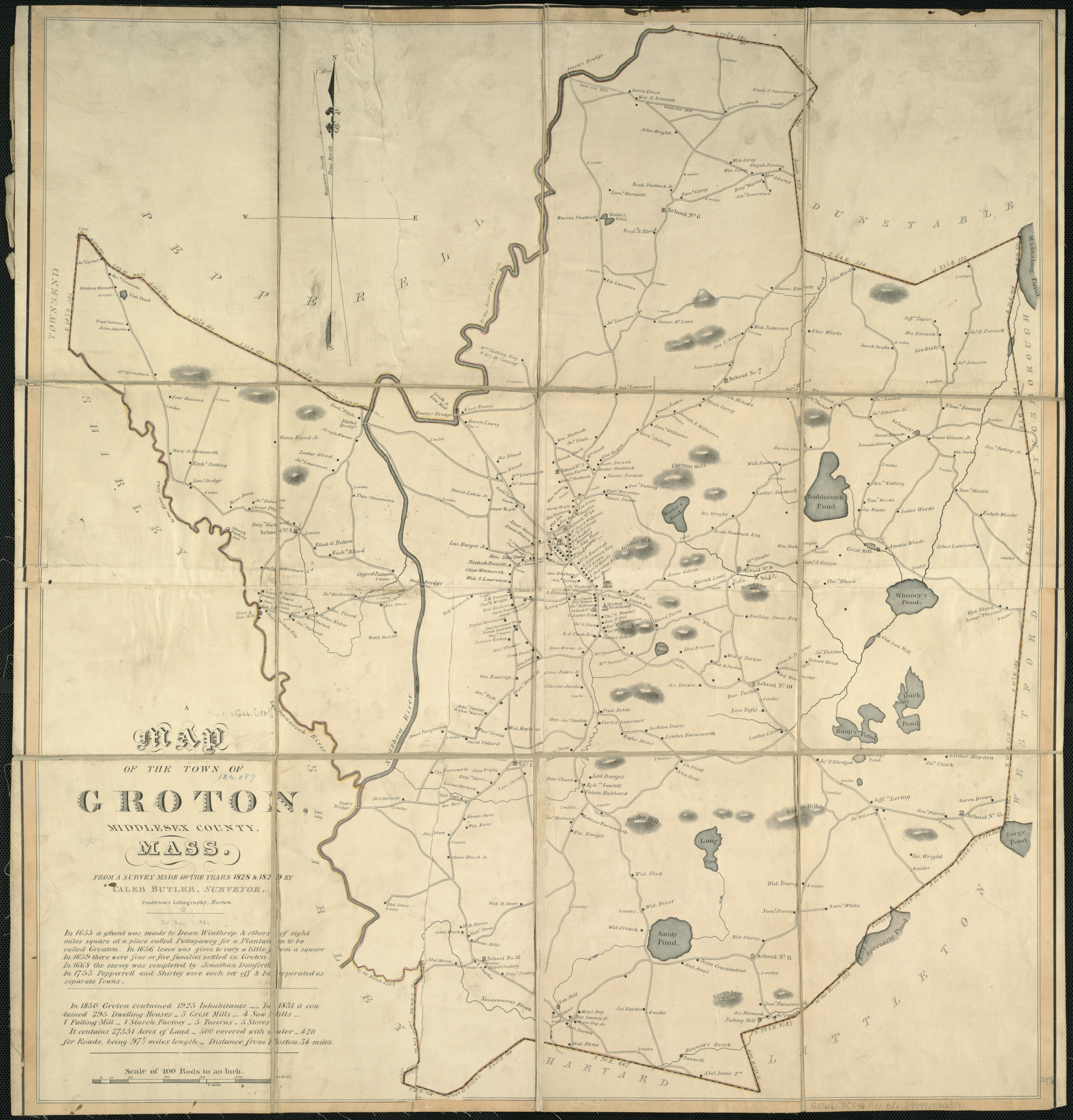
1831 map of Groton showing locations of District Schools

For some portion of the 1850s, then Massachusetts Secretary of Education, and future Governor, and U.S. Secretary of the Treasury George S. Boutwell served on the school committee. While Lawrence Academy had long provided private secondary school opportunities in town, a committee was appointed in November 1855 to consider establishing a new high school. On Monday, December 5, 1859, the first public high school opened in the lower hall of the Town House (Town Hall).

For some time in the 1860s, the high school was held in the upper part of the Gerrish building at Groton Center, before moving into the new District Number 1 school, built in 1870.

In 1870, school number 5 was sold off. In 1871, Ayer was incorporated, taking schools 11 and 12 with it. In 1873, the town elected Clarissa Butler and Mary T. Shumway as the first female members of its school board. On March 2, 1874, the remaining schools were named according to town vote:

- Number 1: Butler School – named after Caleb Butler, former principal of Lawrence Academy, town historian, this served as the town high school from its construction in 1870 at a cost of $32,000 and included three buildings, Butler Grammar, Butler Intermediate, and Butler Primary.
- Number 2: Moors School. Located at the junction of Farmers Row and Culver Road.
- Number 3: Lawrence School. Located at the corner of Long Hill Road and Farmers Row.
- Number 4: Dana School – named after an early town minister. Located near junction of Kemp Street and Pepperell Road in West Groton
- Number 6: Hobart School – named after an early town minister. Located on Nashua Road near Meadowview Road
- Number 7: Chicopee School – later renamed Saltwell School
- Number 8: Trowbridge School – named after an early town minister. Later also known as the Rocky Hill School. Located on Old Dunstable Road between Rocky Hill Road and Hoyt's Warf Road.
- Number 9: Willard School – named after an early town minister. Located on the corner of Lowell Road and School House Road.
- Number 10: Prescott School – named after William Prescott. Located on the corner of Prescott Street and Boston Road.
- Number 13: Chaplin School – named after an early town minister. Located near Forge Village Road and Gilson Road
- Number 14: Winthrop School. Located on Hollis Street near School Street.
- West Groton: Tarbell School

=== Old Dunstable School District ===
Dunstable initially educated its youth through five one-room, numbered district schools in a similar fashion to Groton. In 1895, the schools were merged into one location when the Union School was built in the center of Dunstable village.

=== Regionalization ===
The regional school district was established in 1967 with the high school, middle school, and one of the elementary schools sharing a common campus on Main St. in Groton. In 1999, the "new gym" at the Main Street campus was renovated and renamed as the Peter Twomey Youth Center (PTYC) to honor a then recently deceased student. The PTYC is now "...a self-supporting facility that provides space for youth athletic leagues, adult education, and youth groups in Groton and Dunstable." With the student population expanding in 1993 to its current levels a new high school was needed and the high school relocated in 2003 to its current location near the border between the two towns it serves. Whereas the Middle School expanded into the old high school. In 2008 Prescott closed due to budget problems.

== Schools ==
=== High schools ===
==== Groton-Dunstable Regional High School ====
Groton-Dunstable Regional High School (GDRHS) is located in Groton, Massachusetts and serves the communities of both Groton and Dunstable. This school includes grades 9–12. Approximately 850 students attend GDRHS.

=== Middle schools ===
==== Groton-Dunstable Regional Middle School ====
Groton-Dunstable Regional Middle School

Location
- 344 Main Street; 42.617°N 71.58°W; Groton, MA; United States

Information
- Type: Public
- Motto: Together We Achieve
- School district: Groton-Dunstable Regional School District
- Principal: Wendy Salvatore
- Staff: 95
- Teaching staff: 56
- Grades: 5-8
- Gender: Coeducational
- Enrollment: 755 Students (2019–2020)
  - Grade 5: 197
  - Grade 6: 171
  - Grade 7: 184
  - Grade 8: 203
- Classes: 264
- Student to teacher ratio: 16.5:1
- Colors: Maroon, white and black
- Athletics: Baseball, basketball, cross country, field hockey, softball, track and field
- MCAS % proficient and advanced: ELA: 87; Math: 79; Science: 72 (Spring 2010)

Groton-Dunstable Regional Middle School (GDRMS) is located in Groton, Massachusetts and serves the communities of both Groton and Dunstable. This school includes grades 5 to 8. Approximately 930 students attend GDRMS.

With earlier roots in Groton's Butler Intermediate School, Dunstable's Union School, and a Groton Junior High School which was held in what was prevoisly the Prescott Elementary School building, GDRMS has been at its current Main Street site for many years. Initially the Main Street campus was shared between the Middle School, Florence Roche Elementary, and the High School. During renovations in the 2003–04 school year, the eighth grade temporarily relocated to the lower level of the new high school campus on Chicopee Row, while fifth through seventh grades moved into the old high school, which became Middle School South. In the fall of 2004, the eighth grade returned to the Main Street campus and joined the seventh grade in the newly renovated Middle School North building, which had previously housed the entire middle school.

Groton-Dunstable Regional Middle School offers a variety of clubs to its students on a seasonal basis, primarily on a fee basis through the Peter Twomey Youth Center, but often held in the middle school buildings proper. These clubs include the Big Book: Pages for Peace project, academic clubs such as Homework Help and the Math and Logic club, drama and literature clubs such as the Friday Film Festival, Writers Club, an Improvisation club and a Historical Improvisation club, those oriented around the fine arts such as Open Art Studio, Cartooning Club, Creative Kids crafting, and the Jazz Ensemble, athletic pursuits such as Volleyball and Let's Walk, as well as clubs based around entertainment and leisure activities such as Strategy Games, and the DDR/Hand Held Video Game club.

=== Elementary schools ===
==== Florence Roche Elementary School ====
- Location: 344 Main Street, Groton, MA
- Coordinates:42.6155°N 71.5785°W
- Principal: Elizabeth Garden
- Staff: 63
- Teaching Staff: 32
- Grades: K-4
- Enrollment: 558 Students (2010–2011)
  - Kindergarten: 81
  - Grade 1: 105
  - Grade 2: 127
  - Grade 3: 113
  - Grade 4: 132
- Classes: 162
- Student:teacher ratio: 17.9:1
- MCAS % proficient and advanced: ELA: 77; Math: 78 (Spring 2010)
- URL: https://www.gdrsd.org/o/fres

Florence Roche Elementary School is located in Groton on the original campus. It serves only Groton students. This school supports grades K-4.

==== Swallow Union Elementary School ====
- Location: 522 Main Street, Dunstable, MA
- Coordinates:42.6735°N 71.4828°W
- Principal: Peter S Myerson
- Staff: 44
- Teaching Staff: 23
- Grades: K-4
- Enrollment: 344 Students (2010–2011)
  - Kindergarten: 50
  - Grade 1: 76
  - Grade 2: 65
  - Grade 3: 74
  - Grade 4: 79
- Classes: 106
- Student:teacher ratio: 16.4:1
- MCAS % proficient and advanced: ELA: 79; Math: 84 (Spring 2010)
- URL: https://www.gdrsd.org/o/sues

Swallow Union Elementary School is located in Dunstable, Massachusetts in the village center and served only Dunstable before the closing of Prescott Elementary School. It consists of two buildings. The older, two-story, wood-framed, Union School was constructed in 1895, and the newer Swallow Elementary school is named after Ellen Swallow Richards. This school supports grades K-4.

=== Preschools ===
==== Boutwell Early Childhood Center ====
- Location: 78 Hollis Street, Groton, MA
- Coordinates:42.6145°N 71.5725°W
- Principal: Russell Alfred Hoyt
- Staff: 21
- Teaching Staff: 3.5
- Grades: PK
- Enrollment: 77 Students (2010–2011)
  - pre-Kindergarten: 77
- Classes: 14
- Student:teacher ratio: 21.7:1
- URL: https://www.gdrsd.org/o/becc

First built in 1915, in the Spanish Revival style, the Boutwell school is named after Governor George S. Boutwell, who also served as a Groton school committee member while he was state Secretary of the Board of Education. This school hosts both a preschool and administrative offices.

=== Former Schools ===
==== Colonel William Prescott Elementary School ====
Located in Groton and situated on a three-acre lot, the Prescott school served Groton students before it closed on June 15, 2008, due to a spending gap of $583,808. While most recently a PK-4 elementary school, Prescott first served as the town's high school when the 27,000 square foot two-story Classical Revival styled building opened in 1927. Later it became the Groton Junior High School before becoming the Prescott Elementary School. Since closure as a school, it has housed district administrative offices. During its service as a high school it was also known as Butler School.

- Location: 145 Main Street, Groton, MA

==== Saltwell School ====
Built in 1833 as the one-room, District 7 schoolhouse, this wooden and brick, building was renamed the Chicopee School in 1874 before being renamed again as the Saltwell School. It has been maintained since the late 1800s by the Saltwell School Association, which hosts school tours there.

- Location: 366 Chicopee Row, Groton, MA

==== Tarbell School ====
Located in West Groton, on a 1.44-acre lot on Pepperell Road, the second school there to bear the name Tarbell is a Colonial Revival and Prairie style construction. Built in 1915, it was once an elementary school, but closed in 1991 and is no longer active. It housed administrative offices until 2008.

== Former Superintendents ==
- ?-1971 Bernard C. Dullea
- 1971–? Robert Diamond
- Bernholdt R. Nystrom
- G. Stanley Patey
- 1982–1993 John Barranco
- 1993–2005 Mary Jennings
- 2005–2010 Alan Genovese
- 2010–2012 Joseph A. Mastrocola
- 2012–2014 Anthony Bent
- 2014–2016 Kristan Rodriguez
- 2017 Bill Ryan
- 2017-2024 Laura Chesson
