= Indian Hill House =

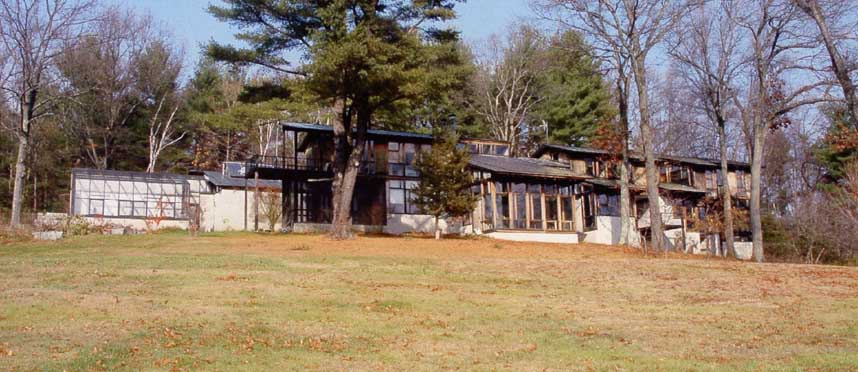
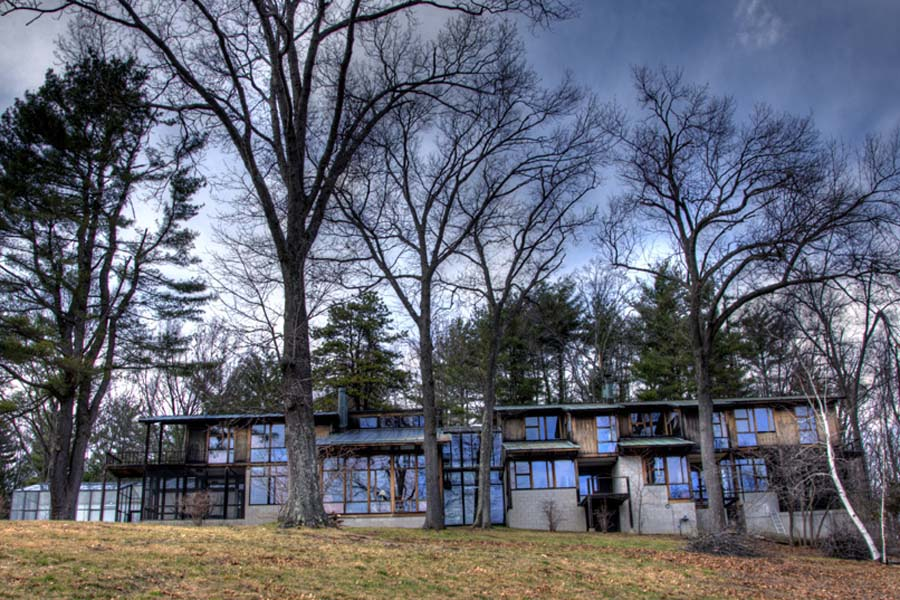
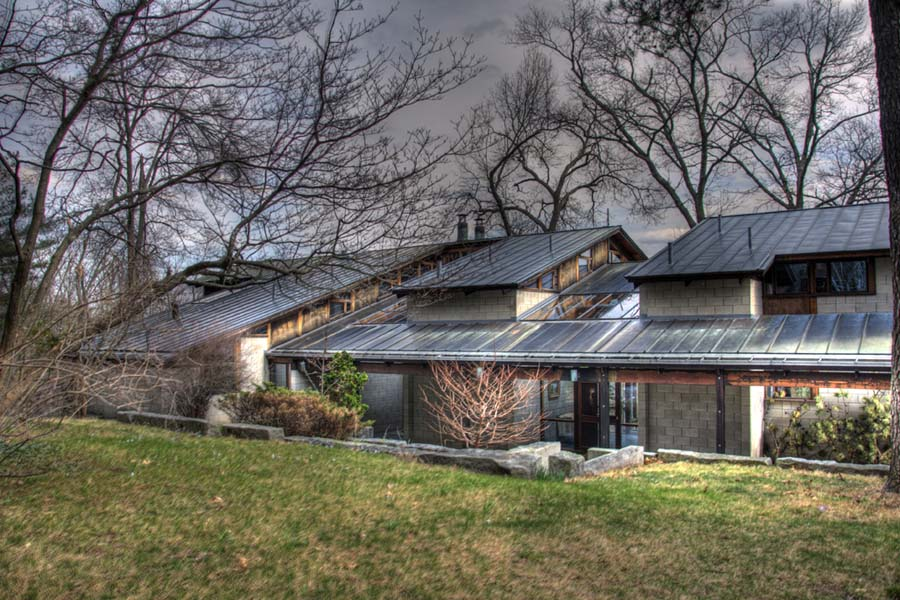
- Northeast view of Indian Hill House, Groton, MA Southwest view of Indian Hill House, Winter 2017. Northern view of Indian Hill House. Southeast view of Indian Hill House.

- Location within Massachusetts
- 42°35′29″N 71°33′24″W
- Location: Groton, Massachusetts

History
- Built: 1962

Site notes
- Architect: Maurice K. Smith
- Architectural style: Mid-Century modern

Indian Hill House is a private residence named for the Indian Hills of Groton, Massachusetts. Designed in 1962-63 by Maurice K. Smith, the house was built by Ralph S. Osmond & Sons.

The house appears in several architectural works, including the Harvard Art Review (1967), Harvard Educational Review (1969), Spazio e Societa, June 1982, as Casa/House 1 and Progressive Architecture (March 1982), [3 images w/o notation].

An extensive photographic study of the house, then only a few years old, was taken for the Winter 1967 issue of Harvard Art Review. In his 1967 work, World Architecture 4, John Donat described this house as "a place that prescribes nothing, an architecture that is intense without imposing itself on you." He goes on to write that this family house is "a place of real options and opportunities [that] can be richly interpreted by whoever is living in it." Architect Smith interviewed Richard Rush in 1982 for an item in Progressive Architecture. In his 1989 work, Architecture and Urbanism, Henry Plummer concluded of this house that it contained "innumerable locales, of fragmentary rooms loosely interlocked, of zones both intimate and grand, created for an almost endless array of eyes, and heads and bodies and voices, an abundance which no longer bears upon the needs of a single person. Not only does the building form evolve but it is never perceived by two persons in quite the same way.". Mr. Plummer returned in 2003 to follow up with Masters of Light: Twentieth Century Pioneers.

MIT School of Architecture Chair Mark Jarzombek wrote in 2013, "Indian Hill House – in a more restrained clean modernist aesthetic — is different from [Smith's] own house in many respects. A series of low, concrete walls staggered across the crest of the hill rise up to meet wooden, glazed walls of slightly different heights. The whole is protected by shed-and-gable roofs designed to appear as thin and lightweight as possible."

See also: Combining Tectonic and Stereotomic Systems, 2014., "Cape Cod Modern: Midcentury Architecture and Community on the Outer Cape," 2014., "Maurice Smith's Spatial Collages," 2016.

Indian Hill House is set on 7 acres (28,000 m2) at the uphill woodland end of Skyfields Drive. The property complements a nearly 500-acre (2.0 km2) preserve of surrounding woodland under care of the Groton Conservation Trust, Massachusetts Audubon Society, and Groton Conservation Commission. Its Indian Hill Road access was closed and the approach changed to Skyfields Drive when the original, larger property was subdivided in March 2000.

During its planning and construction from 1962 to 1965, Indian Hill House was referred to by architect Smith as "Blackman House 1" to be followed in the 1990s by Blackman House 2 (Manchester-By-The-Sea). Blackman House 3 (Groton) was designed by others. Fifty-three drawings and photographs of the house are kept by the MIT Libraries.
