= Edward Saxton Payson =

American Esperantist, writer and translator

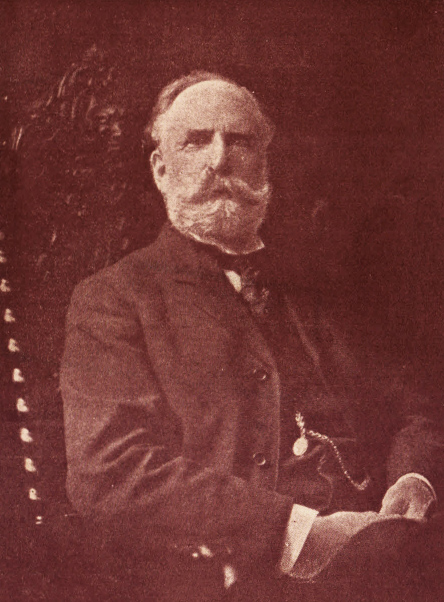
Edward Saxton Payson

Edward Saxton Payson (September 26, 1842 – September 22, 1932) was an American Esperantist, writer and translator. He was born in Groton, Massachusetts.

In his youth he was an opera singer, from 1882 a piano maker, and from 1906 president of a piano manufacturing company.

He began learning Esperanto in 1910, and his translations began appearing in 1919. Between the years 1918-1921 he worked as president of the "Esperanto-Asocio de Norda Ameriko" and after was proclaimed honorary president of that organization.

When he was eighty-seven years old, he wrote an Esperanto novel set in Venice, Juneco kaj Amo (Youth and Love).

His other original writing La fantoma edzino (The Phantom Wife) is a sentimental tale of a man who yearns for his deceased wife so much, that she seems to return.

His translations from English include some works of Mabel Wagnalls, and a novel by Henry Rider Haggard.

He lived in Lexington, Massachusetts for many years at the end of his life, and died there in 1932. (He enjoyed keeping blooded horses, and had a large farm in Lexington with about twenty of them.) He was survived by his wife, Caroline A (nee. Morris).

== Original works ==
- Juneco kaj Amo (1930)
- La Fantoma Edzino (published 1988)

== Translations ==
- La akrobato de Nia Sinjorino (miljara legendo, 1919)
- Kirchner, Lula: Blanche, la virgulino de Lille (1919
- Giesy, J. U.: Mimi (Mimi – a Story of the Latin Quarter in War-time, 1920)
- Anatole France: Thais (1921)
- Wagnalls, Mabel: Miserere (1921)
- Wagnalls, Mabel: Palaco de danĝero (1926) (The Palace of Danger, a Story of la Pompadour)
- Moffett, Cleveland: La karto mistera (1927)
- Henry Rider Haggard: Luno de Izrael (1928 - translated with Montagu C. Butler) (Moon of Israel - a tale of the Exodus)
- Roe, Vingie E.: Lando de arĝenta akvo (1931)
- Wagnalls, Mabel: La rozujo ĉiumiljara
