= Groton-Dunstable Regional High School =

Coordinates: 42.65°N 71.54°W

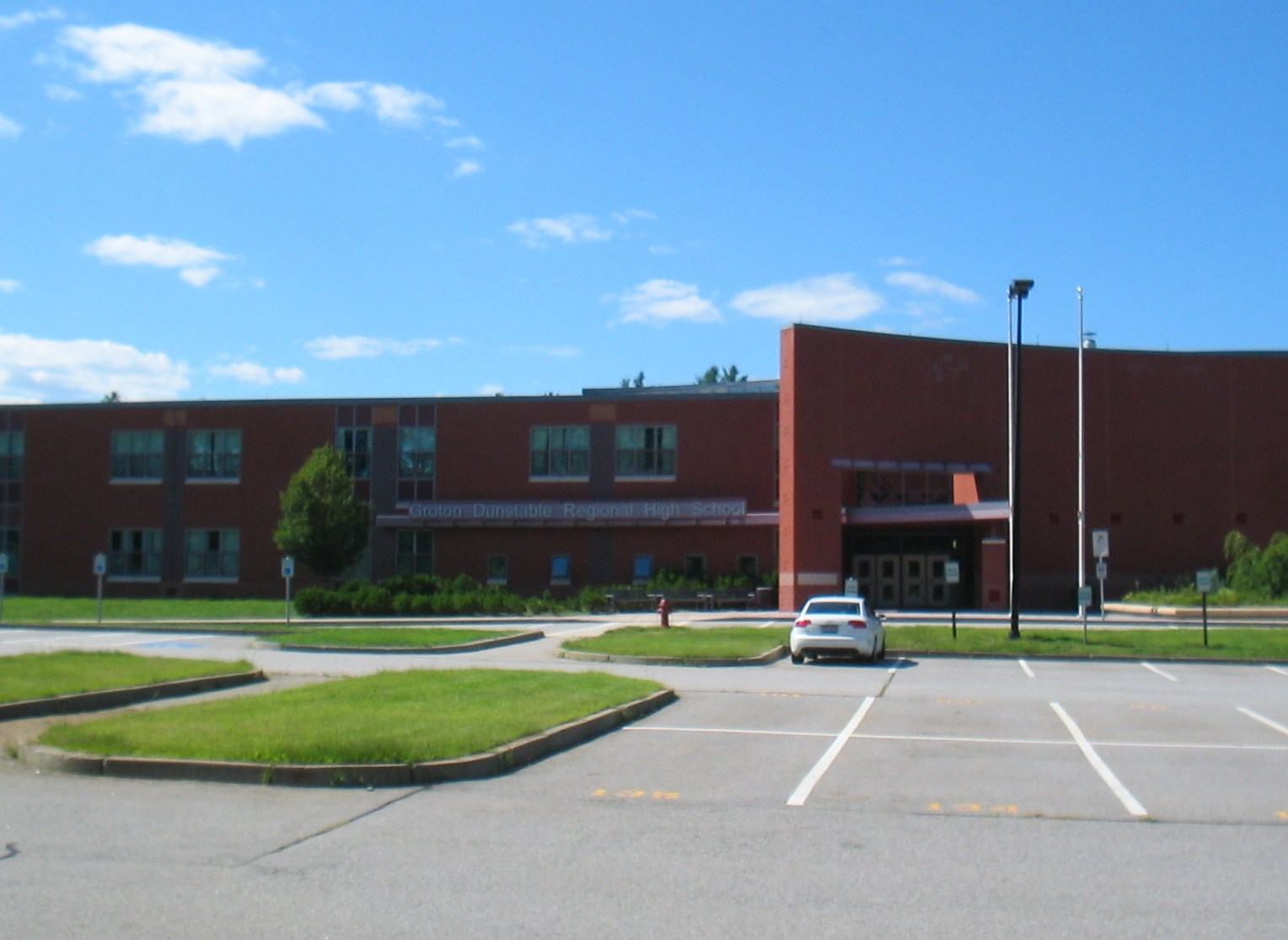

Location
- 703 Chicopee Row P.O. Box 730; Groton, Massachusetts 01450; United States

Information
- Type: Public, secondary, open enrollment
- Motto: Together We Achieve
- School district: Groton-Dunstable Regional School District
- Principal: Richard Arena
- Teaching staff: 51.09 (FTE)
- Grades: 9-12
- Gender: Coeducational
- Enrollment: 689 (2023–2024)
- Student to teacher ratio: 13.49
- Colors: Maroon, white, and black
- Athletics: Alpine skiing, baseball, basketball, cheerleading, cross country, field hockey, football, golf, ice hockey, lacrosse, soccer, softball, swimming, tennis, track & field, volleyball
- Athletics conference: Midland Wachusett League
- Mascot: Crusader aka "Crush"
- Accreditation: NEASC
- National ranking: 139 (2015 Newsweek); 745 (2017 U.S. News & World Report)
- Newspaper: The Crusader
- Yearbook: The Key
- Communities served: Groton, Dunstable
- Scheduling: 4x4 block
- MCAS % proficient and advanced: ELA: 99; Math: 97; Science: 97 (Spring 2017)
- Website: www.gdrsd.org/o/gdrhs

Groton-Dunstable Regional High School (GDRHS) is a high school located in Groton, Massachusetts, United States. It serves the communities of Groton and Dunstable in the Groton-Dunstable Regional School District. While GDRHS is the only public high school located within those communities, students from Groton may also attend the public Nashoba Valley Technical High School and students from Dunstable may attend the public Greater Lowell Technical High School. Approximately 810 students attend GDRHS, and they are primarily graduates of Groton-Dunstable Regional Middle School. GDRHS has a primarily college preparatory curriculum, with approximately 87% of its students attending four-year colleges and over 90% attending two- or four-year colleges upon graduation in 2010.

== History ==
The earliest incarnation of GDRHS was as the grammar school that was held in Groton town center for which there are funding records as far back as 1758. The residency of the grammar school migrated between the district schools and in 1808 was kept for four months in District school number 1, then two months in number 2, two months in number 3, and two months in number five.

While Lawrence Academy had long provided private secondary school opportunities in town, a committee was appointed in November 1855 to consider establishing a new high school. On Monday, December 5, 1859 the first public high school opened in the lower hall of the Town House (Town Hall). For some time in the 1860s, the high school was held in the upper part of the Gerrish building at Groton Center, before moving into the new District Number 1 school, built in 1870 at a cost of $32,000. Nabisco founder Adolphus W. Green briefly served as the school principal in the 1860s. (Note: A humorous achievement on the computer game Cookie Clicker states that Green was principal of the Groton School, but this is incorrect, as that private school was founded in 1884.)

On March 2, 1874, the district schools were named according to town vote, with the high school being named Butler Grammar School after Caleb Butler, former principal of Lawrence Academy, and town historian. A new high school was built in 1927. Now known as the recently closed Prescott Elementary, it continued to be known as the Butler School for some time.

The regional school district was established in 1967 with the high school located on Main St. in Groton. In 1997, the school adopted 4x4 block scheduling. In 1999, the "new gym" at the Main Street campus was renovated and renamed as the Peter Twomey Youth Center (PTYC) in order to honor a then recently deceased student. The PTYC is now "...a self-supporting facility that provides space for youth athletic leagues, adult education, and youth groups in Groton and Dunstable." With the student population expanding from 370 in 1993 to its current levels, a new building was needed. In 2003, at cost of $35 million, the high school relocated to its current location near the border between the two towns it serves.

== Campus ==
GD's 179-acre (0.72 km^{2}) campus lies on Chicopee Row on the Groton side of the Groton-Dunstable border. The current site is just to the east of Reedy Meadow and its fields are bordered by eastern white pine, as well as vernal pools including Bauch Pond and the Ennis Puddle. Near the upper fields and entrance to the grounds is the "Spirit Rock", a large boulder which student groups and individuals have periodically repainted since the spring of 2007.

The main campus building was designed by HMFH Architects to allow outside light into nearly every room and thus features windows along many interior walls. An exception to that rule is Mr. Donnelly's technology room as well as the Black Box Theater which hosts both school and local community performances. Also located within the school is public-access television cable TV station, The Groton Channel.

In November 2013, students and their families were notified that excessive levels of coliform bacteria had been detected in the school's water supply. The system was disinfected and the problem was apparently resolved. The quality of drinking water at the school had been a concern since the new building's completion in 2003.

== Curriculum ==
Most Groton-Dunstable students undertake a college preparatory curriculum that includes four credits of English, three credits of mathematics, social sciences, and laboratory-based sciences including integrated science, two credits each of a single foreign language and physical/behavioral health, one credit of fine arts and one half credit of computer applications. Seniors must also complete a senior project. As G-D is on a 4x4 block schedule, full credit courses are equivalent to a year-long course in a school with traditional 40-50 minute periods. A small number of students with significant special needs instead participate in the Life Skills Experiential Learning program.

Students can choose from 14 Advanced Placement courses to earn college credits.

The English department requires two courses focused on the role of the hero, one on American literature and one on Shakespeare and Chaucer. Electives include courses in both print and broadcast journalism, videography, film studies, theater arts, and creative writing classes along with an English literature AP course. The social studies core requires a credit in world history, and two in United States history. Humanities electives include contemporary issues, women's studies, economics, marketing and entrepreneurship, the student and the law, international business, accounting, modern European history, sociology, public speaking/debate and the U.S. History AP course.

Groton-Dunstable's foreign language offerings include Spanish, and Latin. There is an AP elective for Spanish.

Groton-Dunstable's science/technology department offers courses in molecular biology, anatomy & physiology, environmental studies, astronomy, engineering design & construction. Its AP offerings include biology, chemistry, environmental science and physics (C: Electricity and Magnetism). AP level courses are offered through the math department for both calculus tests as well as for statistics.

The visual arts program includes sequences in studio art, design, and photography. Music courses include concert band, chorus, and chamber chorus.

In addition to the usual sports and conditioning options, the physical and behavioral health program provides courses in child development, health, life-management, and psychology.

== Notable alumni ==
- Kristen Gilbert – serial killer
- Steve Kornacki – political scientist and host of Up With Steve Kornacki on MSNBC
- Dan Shaughnessy – sports journalist and television personality

== Principals ==
- 1975–1980 – David Quattrone
- 1980–1985 – Howard Gilmore
- 1985–1995 – William E. McGuirk
- 1995–2007 – Joseph P. Dillon, oversaw transition to new building and campus
- 2007–2010 – Shelley Marcus Cohen
- 2010–2011 – Stephen Dlott
- 2012–2016 – Michael Mastrullo
- 2016–2022 – Michael Woodlock
- 2022–2025 – Stephen Sierpina
- 2025–present – Richard Arena
