= Kristen Gilbert =

American serial murderer and former nurse

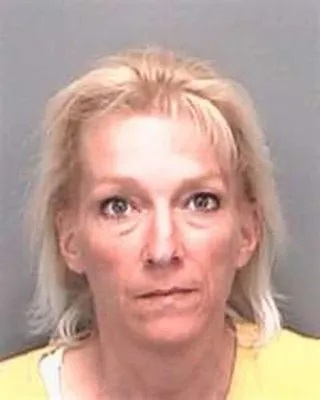
- Mug shot taken by the Federal Bureau of Prisons
- Born: Kristen Heather Strickland; November 13, 1967 (age 58); Fall River, Massachusetts, U.S.
- Other name: "The Angel of Death"
- Occupation: Nurse
- Spouse: Glenn Gilbert (m. 1988; div. 1998)
- Children: 2
- Status: Incarcerated
- Motive: Attention seeking
- Convictions: First degree murder (3 counts); Second degree murder Assault with intent to commit murder (2 counts)
- Penalty: Four consecutive life sentences without parole, plus 20 years

Details
- Victims: 4+
- Span of crimes: 1995 – 1996 (Gilbert is suspected of deaths dating back to 1989)
- Country: United States
- State: Massachusetts
- Imprisoned at: FMC Carswell

Kristen Heather Gilbert (née Strickland; born November 13, 1967) is an American serial killer and former nurse who was convicted of four murders and two attempted murders of patients admitted to the Veterans Affairs Medical Center (VAMC) in Northampton, Massachusetts. She induced cardiac arrest in patients by injecting their intravenous therapy bags with lethal doses of epinephrine, commonly known as adrenaline, which is an untraceable heart stimulant. She would then respond to the coded emergency, often resuscitating the patients herself. Prosecutors said Gilbert was on duty for about half of the 350 deaths that occurred at the hospital from when she started working there in 1989, and that the probability of this merely being a coincidence was 1 in 100 million. However, her only confirmed victims were Stanley Jagodowski, Henry Hudon, Kenneth Cutting, and Edward Skwira.

== Early life ==
Gilbert was born Kristen Heather Strickland in Fall River, Massachusetts, on November 13, 1967, the elder of Richard and Claudia Strickland's two daughters. Richard was an electronics executive, while Claudia was a homemaker and part-time teacher. As she entered her teenage years, friends and family noticed that she had a habit of lying. She had a history of faking suicide attempts to manipulate people. According to court records, she had made violent threats against others since she was a teenager.

Gilbert graduated from Groton-Dunstable Regional High School in Groton, Massachusetts. In 1986, she enrolled at Bridgewater State College in Bridgewater, Massachusetts. After a fake suicide attempt, she was ordered into psychiatric treatment by Bridgewater State College officials. Because of this, in 1987, she transferred to Mount Wachusett Community College in Gardner, Massachusetts and then to Greenfield Community College in Greenfield, Massachusetts. She graduated from the latter with a nursing diploma, becoming a registered nurse in 1988. Later that year, she married Glenn Gilbert.

== Career and murders ==
In 1989, Gilbert joined the staff of the Veterans Affairs Medical Center in Northampton. She was featured in the magazine VA Practitioner in April 1990. Although other nurses noticed a high number of deaths on Gilbert's watch, they passed it off and jokingly called her "The Angel of Death." In 1996, however, three nurses reported their concern about an increase in cardiac arrest deaths and a decrease in the supply of epinephrine, and an investigation ensued. Gilbert telephoned in a bomb threat to attempt to derail the investigation.

Gilbert left the hospital in 1996 amid a hospital investigation into the many suspicious patient deaths that occurred during her shifts. That fall, Gilbert checked herself into psychiatric hospitals seven times, staying between one and ten days each time. In January 1998, Gilbert stood trial for calling in a bomb threat to the Northampton VAMC to retaliate against coworkers and former boyfriend James Perrault (who also worked at the hospital) for their participation in the investigation. In April 1998, Gilbert was convicted of that crime.

VA hospital staff members speculated that Gilbert may have been responsible for 350 or more deaths and more than 300 medical emergencies. The prosecutor in her case, Assistant US Attorney William M. Welch II, asserted that Gilbert used these emergency situations to gain the attention of then-boyfriend Perrault, a VA police officer – hospital rules required that hospital police be present at any medical emergency. Perrault testified against her, saying that she confessed at least one murder to him by phone while she was hospitalized in a psychiatric ward. Defense attorney David P. Hoose claimed reasonable doubt based on a lack of direct evidence.

William Boutelle, a psychiatrist who served as chief of staff at the Northampton VAMC, has theorized that she created emergency medical crisis situations to display her proficiency as a nurse.

At the trial, prosecutors described a history of violence, alleging that she had used a large kitchen knife in an assault in Greenfield, Massachusetts in January or February 1988, caused a medical emergency by removing a patient's breathing tube at the VA hospital on January 30, 1994, and twice tried to murder a person by poison in November 1995. Prosecutors also alleged that Gilbert abandoned a patient undergoing cardiac arrest on November 9, 1995, and then asked another nurse to accompany her on a check of patients, waiting until her colleague independently spotted the patient's difficulty before raising an alarm, and, on November 17, 1995, forced an untrained colleague to use cardiac defibrillation paddles on a patient during a medical emergency by refusing to use the equipment herself. Prosecutors further alleged that Gilbert tried to poison a patient at the VA hospital on January 28, 1996, and threatened the life of at least one person verbally and physically in July 1996. While working as a home health aide before becoming a registered nurse, and about eight years before her VAMC crimes, Gilbert deliberately scalded a mentally handicapped child with hot bath water.

On March 14, 2001, a federal jury convicted Gilbert on three counts of first-degree murder, one count of second-degree murder and two counts of attempted murder. Though Massachusetts does not have capital punishment at the state level, her crimes were committed on federal property and thus tried in federal court and subject to the federal death penalty. Prosecutors, in an attempt to secure a penalty of death, sought to admit evidence of aggravating factors during the penalty phase, including Gilbert's 1998 conviction for the bomb threat; the defense introduced evidence of mitigating factors, including the well-being of Gilbert's two children.

On March 26, 2001, the jury recommended a sentence of life imprisonment. On March 27, the judge formally sentenced Gilbert to four consecutive life terms without the possibility of parole, plus 20 years. She was transferred from a prison for women in Framingham, Massachusetts to FMC Carswell in Fort Worth, Texas, where she has remained ever since.

In July 2003, Gilbert dropped her federal appeal for a new trial after a new US Supreme Court ruling that would have allowed prosecutors to pursue the death penalty upon retrial.

== Personal life ==
Gilbert had two sons with Glenn Gilbert before they divorced in 1998. At the time of her arrest, she lived in Setauket, New York.

== See also ==
- Beverley Allitt, another nurse dubbed "The Angel of Death" who was responsible for killing patients.
- Charles Cullen, a nurse who admitted to killing at least 40 patients and is suspected to be most prolific serial killer in the U.S.
- Harold Shipman, the British doctor dubbed "Doctor Death" whose inquiry suggested he was responsible for 250 deaths.

General:

- List of serial killers in the United States
- List of medical and pseudo-medical serial killers
