= Bancroft's castle =

Bancroft's Castle
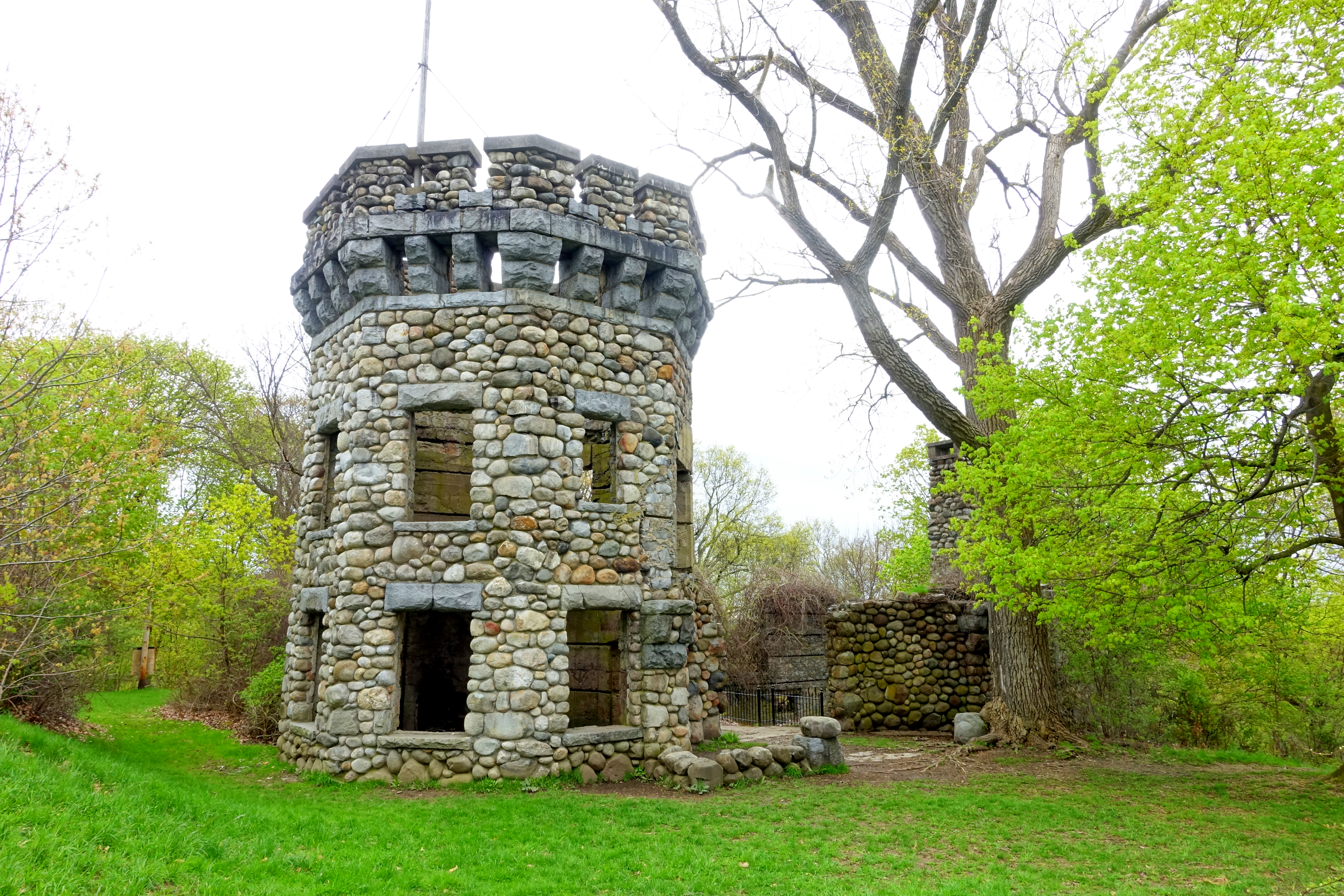
- Bancroft's Castle

General information
- Location: Gibbet Hill Groton, Massachusetts
- Coordinates: 42°36′30.7″N 71°33′35.6″W

Bancroft's castle was built by General William Bancroft in 1906 atop Gibbet Hill in Groton, Massachusetts. Since 2000, the "castle" and trails became part of Groton's protected open space and was opened to the public.

== History and uses ==
Bancroft built the structure as a gift for his wife. He originally intended it as a bungalow to accompany a larger castle-like house, but lost funding before the additions could be realized.

In 1918, physician Harold Ayres purchased the bungalow and renovated it into a sanitarium.

During the 1930s, the Groton Hunt Club used the bungalow for entertainment. During a July 4 fireworks celebration in 1932, the bungalow caught fire - leaving only the exterior stone walls intact.

Now anyone may hike to the top of the hill and visit what remains of the castle.
