= Possession of Elizabeth Knapp =

Alleged possession in Massachusetts, 1671

The possession of Elizabeth Knapp of Groton, Massachusetts was documented by Samuel Willard, a prominent preacher in the Puritan, Massachusetts Bay Colony from October 30, 1671 until January 12, 1672. More significantly, Willard sent letters to the Puritan minister Cotton Mather who published an account of Elizabeth Knapp's possession in his Magnalia Christi Americana.

Knapp, who was sixteen at the time was the daughter of a farmer and the servant in the house of Willard. Her possession, which has striking resemblance to those that are seen in Salem some twenty years later, serves as an insight into Puritan life and society.

== Life in Groton ==
Groton, Massachusetts is located 32 mi (51 km)s north-west of Boston. During the time of Elizabeth Knapp's possession it was located in the Massachusetts Bay Colony. In 1676, just four years after the Knapp case, the town was attacked by 400 Native Americans, and all but a few of the homes were destroyed in the attack. Groton had an overwhelmingly strict religious atmosphere being predominately Puritan, as well as holding views that women should contribute in the community labor.

== The possession ==
The possession case of Elizabeth Knapp is unique and strange in the aspect that it was documented and approached from a thoughtful, and scientific aspect. Knapp was the servant at the household of Samuel Willard, a prominent Reverend in the church of Groton. This became an issue because Willard was known for his sermons about damnation and obedience to God. One Sermon in particular states that the youth of the town should have been very careful because, "although God is ready to receive them, the Devil is ready to endeavor them". When Knapp, a member of his own household, began to show signs of a demonic possession, Willard took a careful and scientific approach to the situation, which was rare for 17th century Puritan New England. He called in a medical doctor on several occasions and tried to find a cure for her symptoms. After they could provide no explanation for her fits he declared that it was a case of possession. Throughout the entire process, as noted in his journal, Knapp seemed to have the most violent fits when he was present. Willard carefully and meticulously documented Knapp daily from the night she first showed signs, Monday October 30, 1671, until January 12, 1672.

Willard states that Knapp, at first, began to complain of pains throughout her body. She would grab certain body parts, such as her leg, breast, and neck and yell out, particularly about strangulation. She would go through emotional fits, sometimes laughing to the point of hysterics, weeping, or screaming out. Hallucinations then followed. On several occasions she claimed to see "two persons" walking around her. Also she stated to have seen a man floating around her bed. Knapp also broke out into fits, particularly at night time, and convulse on the ground. Then she tried to throw herself into the fire. Willard notes that on the first Sabbath day after the symptoms appeared the young girl became violent, leaping, and contorting her body to the point where it took three to four people to hold her down. As she was throwing these fits, she would yell out the words: "money, money, sin and misery, misery!" Willard then documented that on the night of November 2, 1671, Knapp made a confession of meeting with the devil, a characteristic of most possession cases. She stated that for three years the devil met with her promising her money, youth, ease from labor, and the ability to see the world. She then claimed that he had presented her with a book of blood covenants which were signed by other women as well. She also said the Devil had tried to get her to kill herself and others, Willard and his family included, but she could not do what he asked. She continued with fits and apparitions of the Devil and various other spirits until the night of November 28, in which she had a fit lasting for 48 hours. Afterwards she was in a catatonic state until the night of December 8, in which she made the confession that after being assaulted by the devil various times, she made the pact with him, and allowed him into her bed. Willard's Journal continued on to state that she, throughout the month of December goes in and out of violent fits, one much worse than the next, she talks in a strange, deep voice, and made animal sounds. It is also this during these few weeks that Willard states the Devil, "talked through her body", calling him a "rogue" minister.

Willards entries do not begin again until January 10, 1672, where he writes that he met with Knapp again. She confessed to him that the Devil had control of her body and that he was much more powerful than she was. She stated that he also took hold of her speech and she had no control of the things that she was saying. The next night she went into a fit of hysterical crying and weeping in which she called for Willard's presence. The fits "held her till late in the night...as long as [Willard] tarried, which was more than an hour. I left her in them. And thus she continues speechless to this instant January 15." After this night Willard ends his documentation of the possession case stating that he will leave it to those who are "more learned, aged, and judicious" than he was.

Willard concluded his entries with a final four points in which he gave his final opinions about the validity of the possession case. In the first point he stated that Knapp's distemper in no way can be counterfeit on the grounds that it was physically impossible to fake such actions. The second point refers to whether or not her temper was natural or diabolical, in which he stated, because of the length of her convulsions and the strength of her fits, he believed them to be diabolical. In the third point he concluded that even though many were skeptical of the fact that the devil talked through the girl, he was convinced. He stated on several occasions she spoke with her mouth closed, her throat would swell up like a balloon, and the voices that he heard were not her own. However, in the fourth point he said he has strong doubts about Knapp making a pact with the Devil. This is because she is so contradictory about the facts, and what happened in her supposed meetings with the Devil. Willard went on to give several powerful sermons in the village of Salem during the Salem Witch Trials in 1692, as well as discredited evidence of conviction for several women during the trials, stating that the trials should be held in a "fair and legal way". After Willard stopped entries into his journal, her case has been cited and used as examples by various historians. She went on to marry a man named Samuel Scripture in 1674, and they had a family. In 1721, she died.

== Possible explanations ==
In the study of Witchcraft in history there has been many psychological theories that have arisen as to why so many possession cases took place during the 17th and 18th centuries. One theory is the strict religious atmosphere at the time. It is apparent that most possession cases took place in areas in which religion was the predominant aspect of the society. This could be responsible in the aspect that Knapp felt confined in her community and was frustrated with her situations. She acted out, both mentally and physically, in the only way that she knew, which was through religion. By saying and acting as if she was possessed by the Devil she was rebelling against the institution which was restricting her. For example, when Knapp stated that the Devil tried to bribe her on several occasions with fine silks and an ease of labor, her giving in would have been her breaking down her Christian loyalties.

A second explanation of could be in regards to the dissatisfaction that Elizabeth Knapp felt about her placement in society. Once she began showing her symptoms she no longer was required to do her work as a servant. Servants, in Puritan New England were treated harshly, especially women who were expected to do most of the manual labor. They had to care for the entire house and the children. She used the possession as an excuse to speak out against all those who held authority over her, for example Willard, her master and Reverend, and her father. The possession, in a sense, moved her up a place in society. Knapp was no longer a sixteen-year-old girl, but an important person who was known throughout the town. No longer considered just a child Knapp now had a place in the Puritan society which did not involve being someone's servant.
