= Groton Hill Music Center =

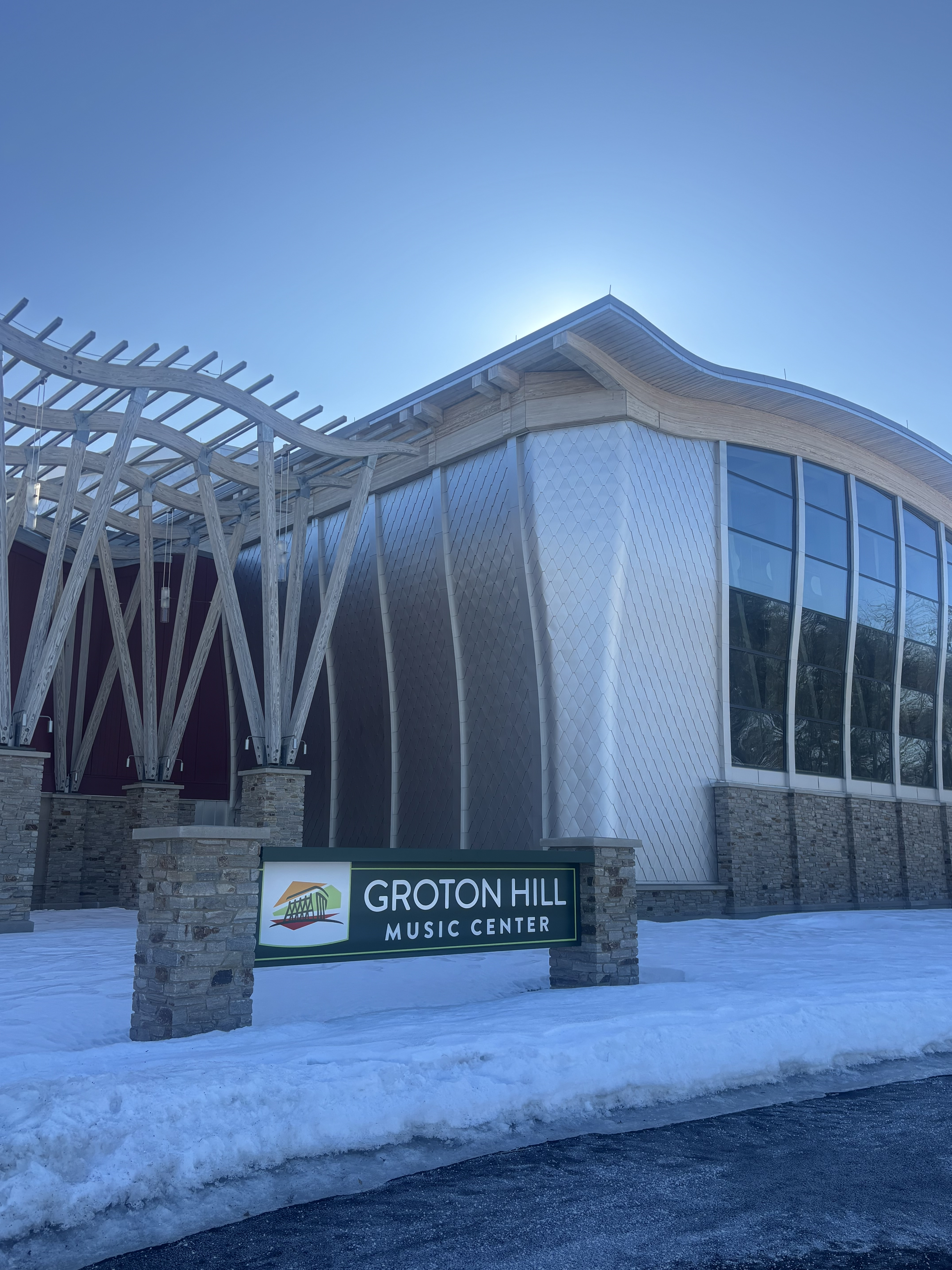
- Entrance of the GHMC Building
- Former names: Indian Hill Music

General information
- Type: Music education and performance venue
- Location: 122 Old Ayer Road, Groton, Massachusetts, United States
- Coordinates: 42.593682°N 71.572473°W
- Groundbreaking: Early 2017
- Completed: 2022
- Opened: September 2022

Technical details
- Floor area: 126,000 square feet
- Grounds: 110 acres

Design and construction
- Architect: Epstein Joslin Architects

Website
- grotonhill.org

Groton Hill Music Center is a nonprofit music education and performance venue in Groton, Massachusetts. Originally founded as Indian Hill Music in 1985, the organization rebranded with the opening of its new facility in 2022. The 126,000-square-foot center sits on 110 acres of preserved farmland and features a 1,000-seat main hall with outdoor lawn seating, a 300-seat recital hall, a 50-seat performance hall, and 35 private instruction spaces.

The Center serves as a regional hub for music education, educating over 1,500 students and employing 70 instructors. It offers private lessons, ensembles, and outreach programs in partnership with local schools and community organizations. The center is home to the Vista Philharmonic Orchestra and presents performances by artists across genres.

== History and development ==
=== Indian Hill Music and donation ===
The organization traces its origins to Indian Hill Music, which was founded in 1985 in Groton, Massachusetts, before relocating to Littleton, Massachusetts, where it initially operated out of a decommissioned elementary school and later moved to a converted barn. In 2014, a private anonymous donor proposed the development of a new facility to establish Central Massachusetts as an arts destination.

=== Construction and opening ===
After over a year of planning, land was acquired from Thomas More College of Liberal Arts, and the construction of Groton Hill Music Center commenced in early 2017, continuing through the COVID-19 pandemic. The facility, which serves as the new home for the organization, was constructed on land that was formerly an apple orchard.

The organization rebranded from Indian Hill Music to reflect its mission, cultural respect, and its Groton roots.

Groton Hill Music Center opened its doors to students in September 2022. Upon its launch, the Center welcomed over 1,000 students.

=== Community impact ===
Groton Hill Music Center is a nonprofit organization dedicated to arts and culture, supported by contributions from individuals, businesses, foundations, and the Massachusetts Cultural Council. Groton Hill Music Center actively collaborates with the Destination Groton Committee and local businesses to enhance Groton’s profile as a cultural and tourism destination.

== Facilities and architecture ==
=== Overview ===
Groton Hill Music Center is a 126,000-square-foot facility situated on 110 acres of former farmland, which was once an apple orchard and horse farm. Approximately 75 acres of the land have been preserved as agricultural fields and conservation space.

=== Architectural design ===
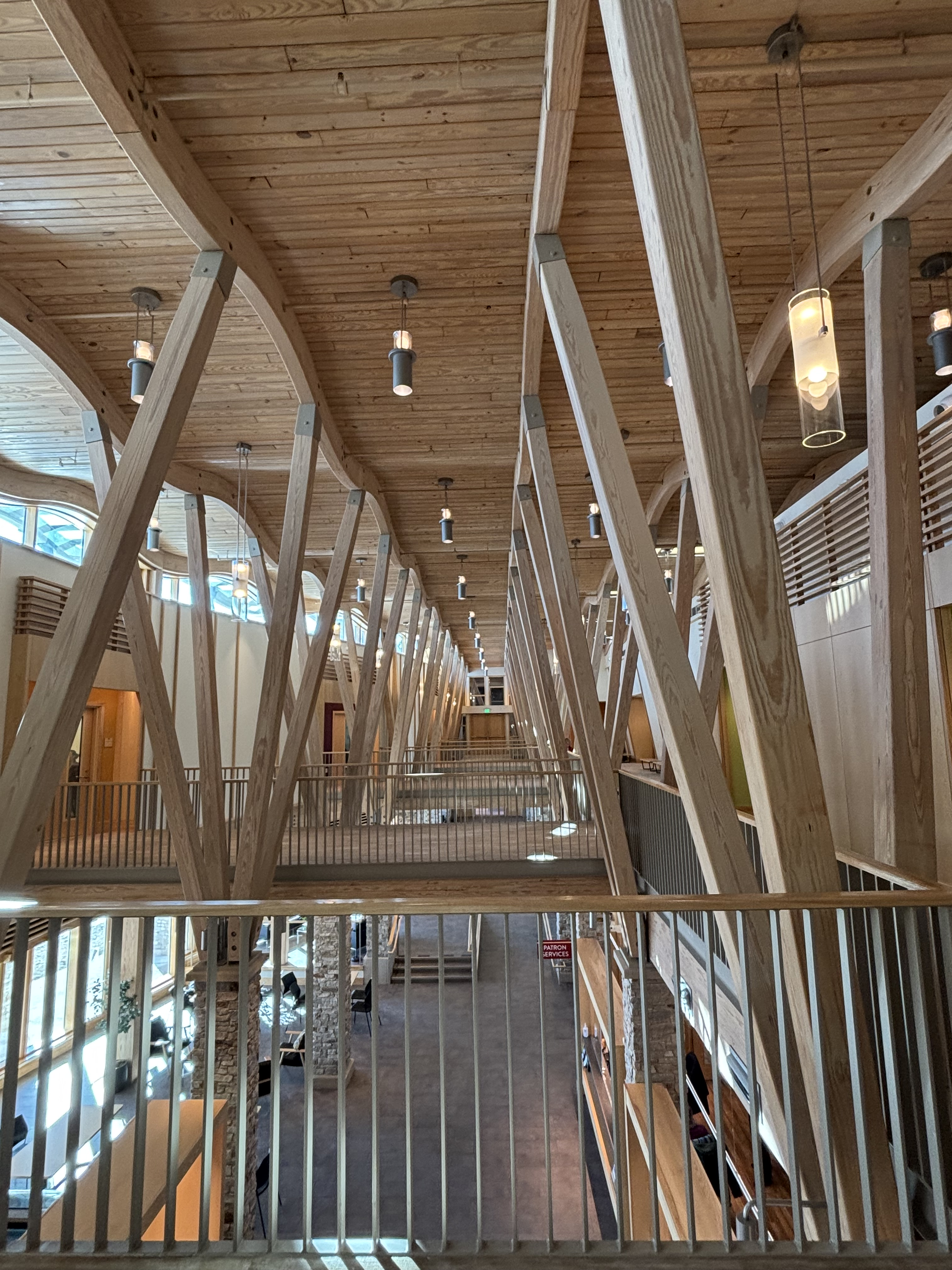
Interior Architecture of the GHMC Building

Groton Hill Music Center, designed by Epstein Joslin Architects, integrates stone, timber, metal, and glass to reflect the natural landscape and the site's history as an apple orchard. Architects Alan Joslin and Deborah Epstein, known for their work on Tanglewood’s Seiji Ozawa Hall and the Shalin Liu Performance Center, designed the facility to enhance acoustics and aesthetic appeal.

The building features Southern yellow pine, ash, and oak for interior woodwork. Stone and large glass panels offer views of the surrounding conservation land and the red and stainless steel exterior resembles a barn and silo.

=== Performance halls ===
==== The Concert Hall ====
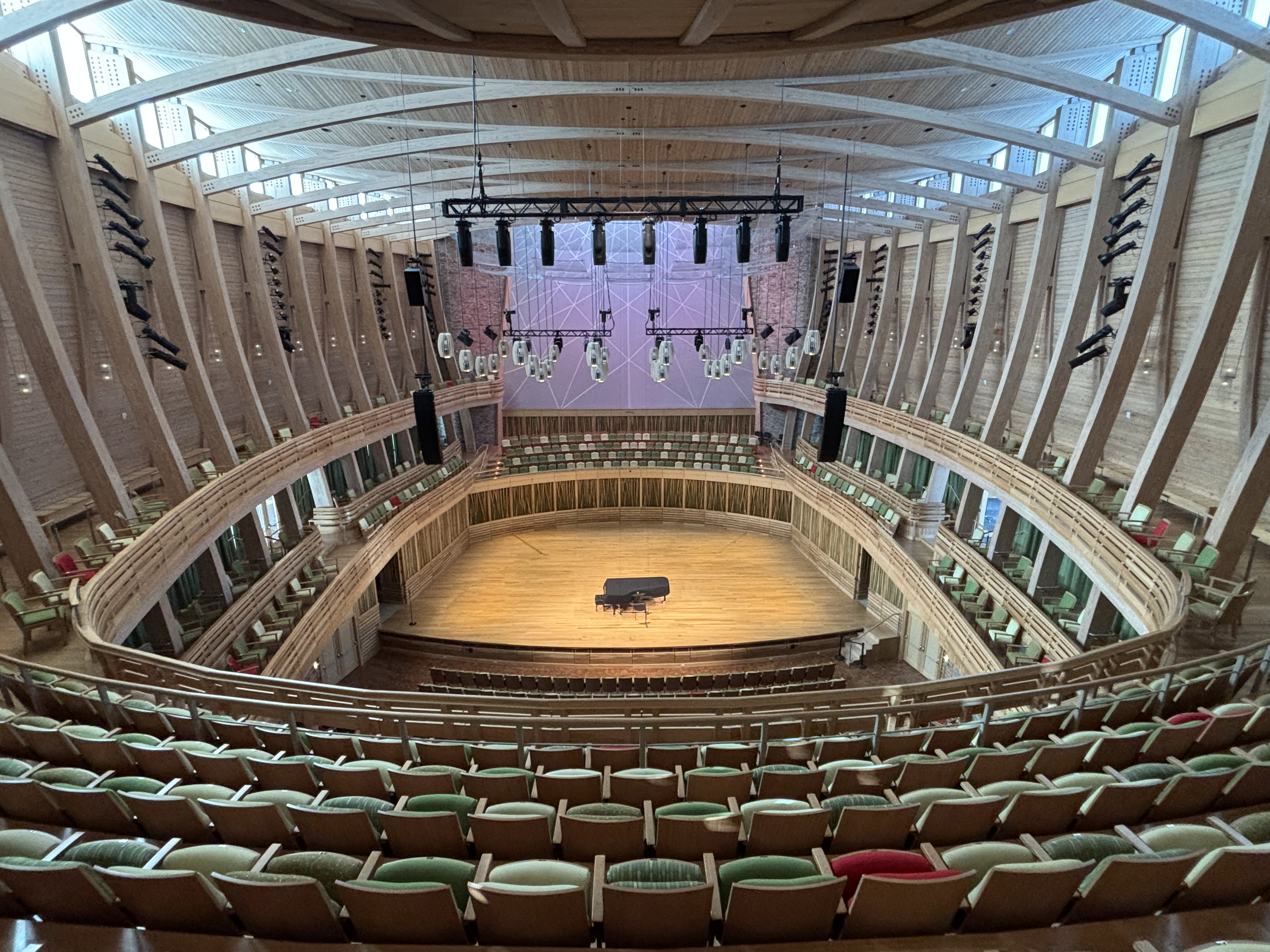
The Concert Hall

The Center’s 1,000-seat venue, "The Concert Hall," is designed to accommodate large-scale performances, featuring a combination of natural materials, such as timber and stone. The Concert Hall features large rear sliding doors, which open to a lawn area capable of accommodating 1,500 additional guests. A curved, permeable front projection screen functions as both an acoustic enhancer and a visual display surface. The Concert Hall utilizes 3D projection mapping technology.

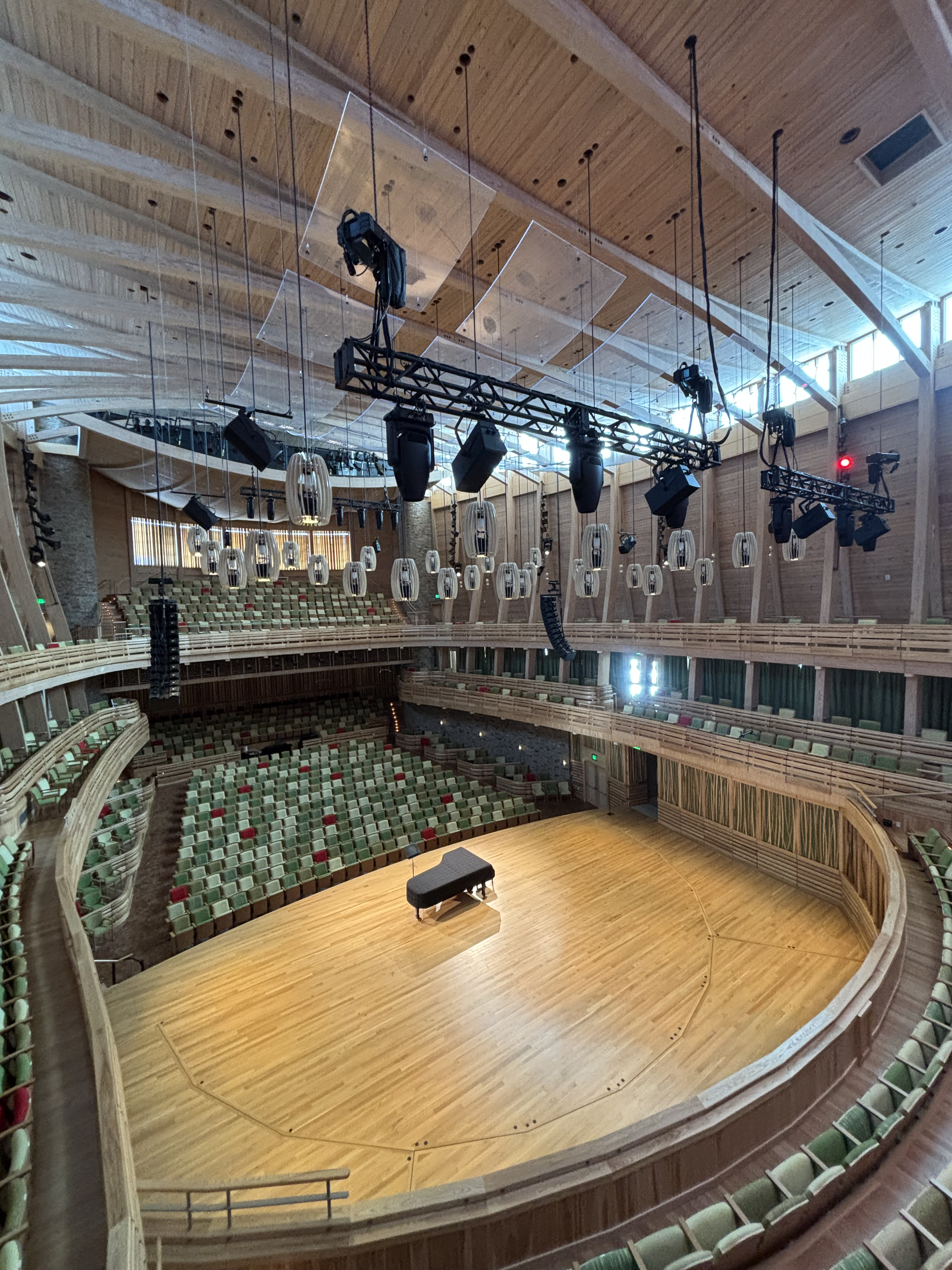
The Concert Hall

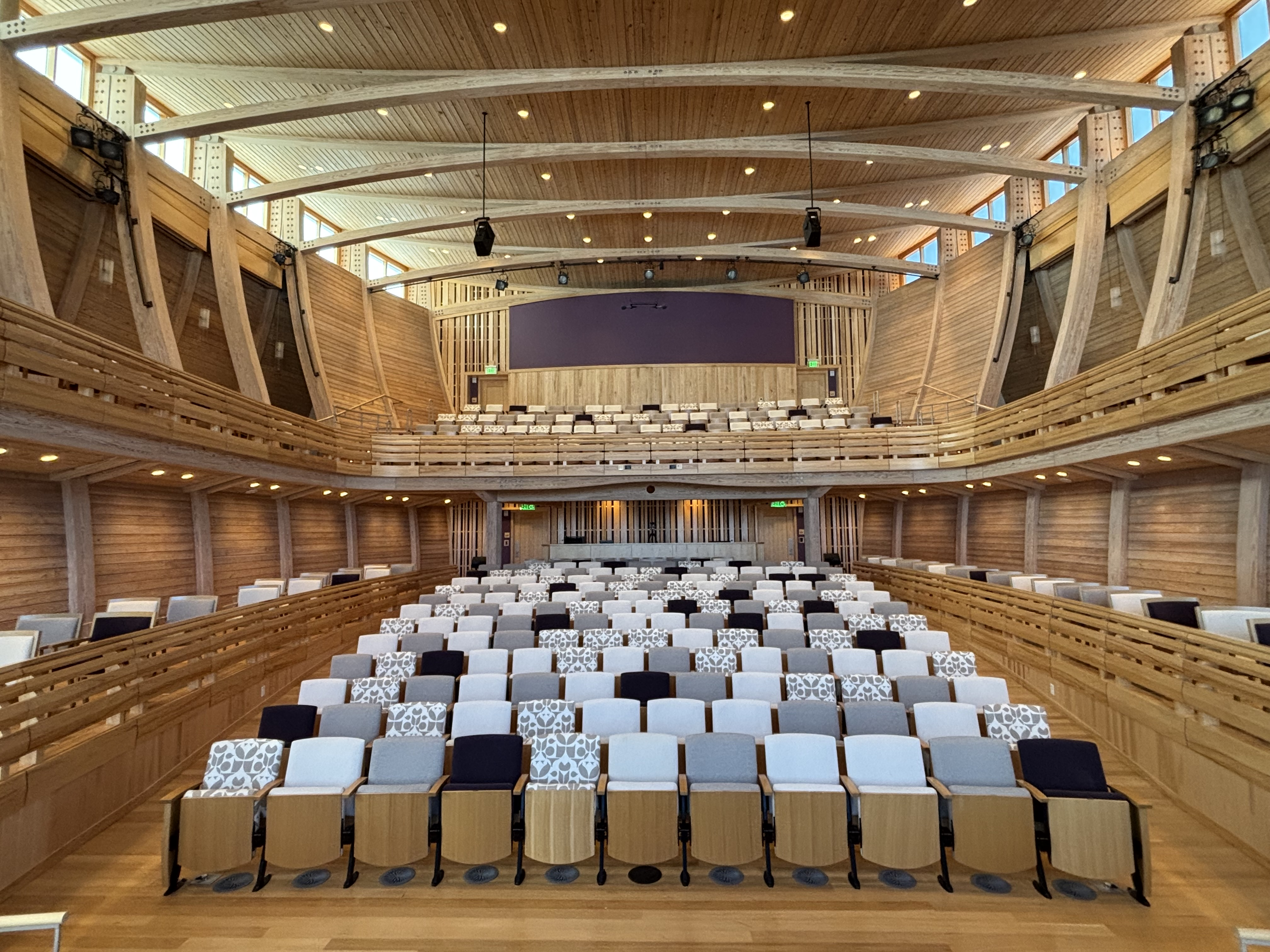
Meadow Hall

==== Meadow Hall ====
The 300-seat Meadow Hall includes a design that evokes the bow of a ship. The venue is home to a Steinway & Sons concert grand piano, which was donated by Paul Matisse, the owner of the Kalliroscope Gallery in Groton, Massachusetts.

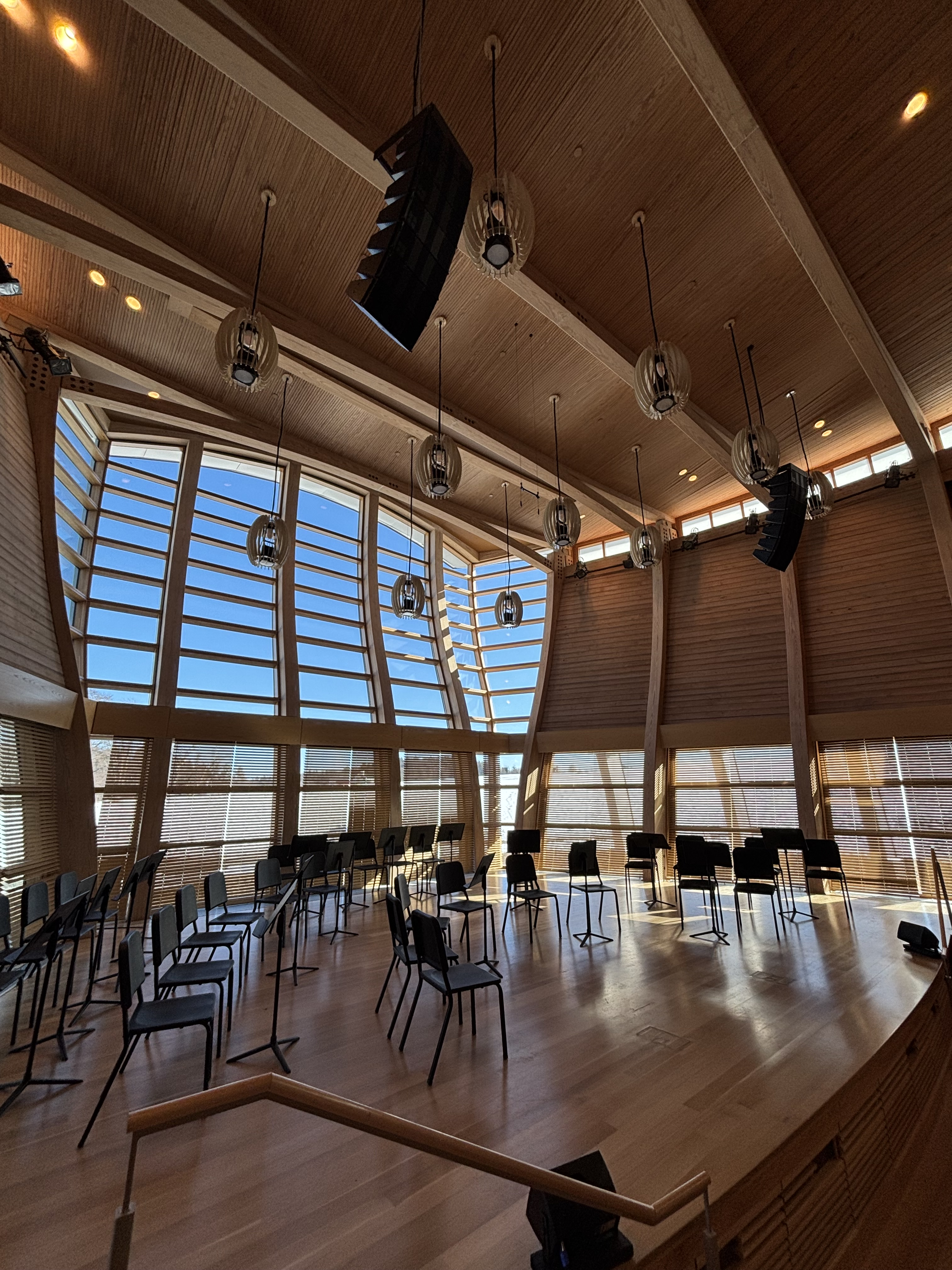
Meadow Hall Stage

=== Additional spaces and amenities ===
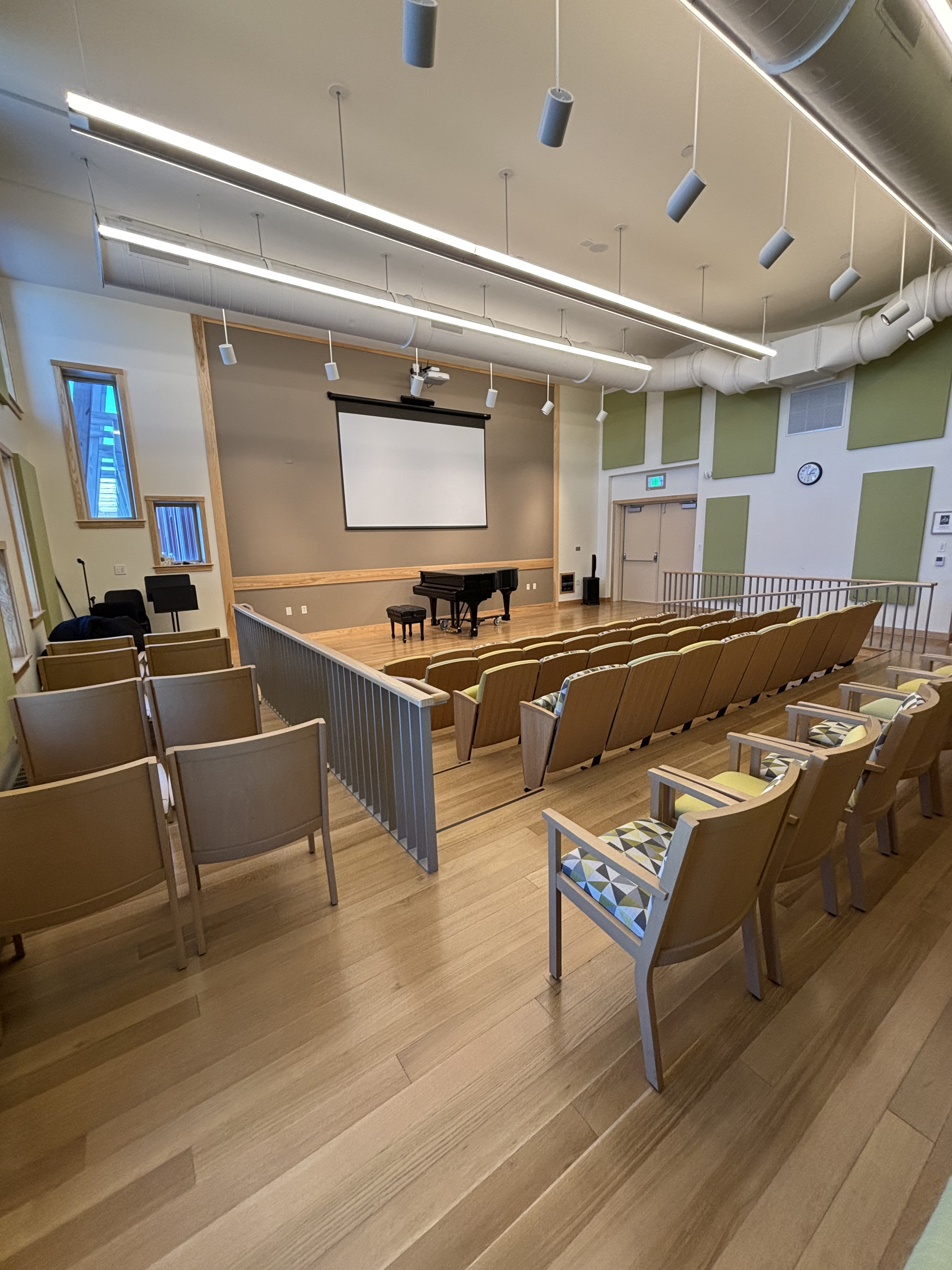
The Orchard

The facility features an additional 50-seat concert hall called the "Orchard", two flexible rehearsal and teaching spaces, 35 studio classrooms dedicated to music instruction, and livestreaming and recording technology for broadcasting performances. The facility features the Woodland Room, a full-service restaurant available on select concert dates. Outdoor areas include dining terraces, a lawn between the two performance halls, and a sloped seating area behind The Concert Hall. Active apple orchards at the top of the southern slope are also part of the facility’s landscape.

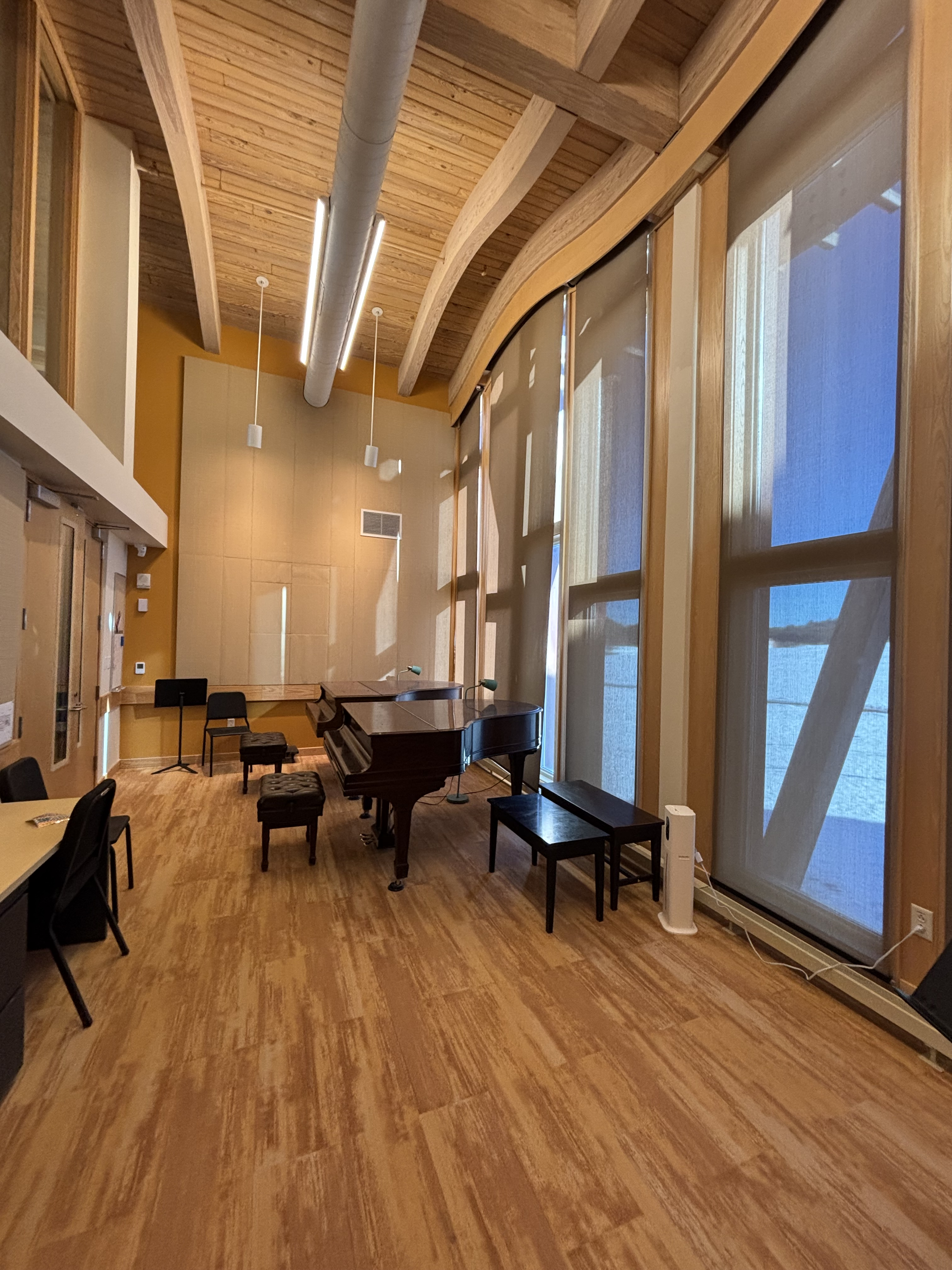
Studio Rehearsal Room

=== Acoustics and sound design ===
The acoustics of the performance spaces were designed in collaboration with Threshold Acoustics from Chicago, Illinois. The space incorporates electronically adjustable sound panels that allow for tailored acoustic experiences, ensuring optimal sound quality for various performances. Key acoustic features include ash wood slats and rippled stone walls that diffuse sound effectively, as well as clear hanging canopy panels that help preserve sound energy.

==== Virtual pipe organ ====
The concert hall features a virtual pipe organ (VPO), designed and installed by Meta Organworks. Originally commissioned in 2018, the VPO was completed in early 2023 after several years of development and collaboration. The VPO utilizes Hauptwerk software, which allows the instrument to emulate a wide array of organ voices from different periods and styles, offering performers access to sounds from notable organs worldwide. Touch-screen stop jambs and ergonomic podiums further modernize the hall, offering performers flexible control over the virtual organ’s extensive sample library, which includes sounds from organs such as the Cavaillé-Coll of St. Étienne in Caen, France, and the Walcker of Martinikerk in Doesburg, Netherlands.

=== Sustainability and landscape integration ===
The facility features durable stainless steel roofing and an efficient water management system to prevent runoff damage. Sun and glare control in performance spaces are managed through the use of wood louvers, allowing for natural lighting adjustments, and acoustic drapes, which can darken the Concert Hall as needed. To minimize noise pollution, the facility is strategically designed so that sound disperses over surrounding hills rather than affecting neighboring areas. Additionally, it adheres to International Dark Sky Association standards, employing targeted illumination to prevent light pollution.

== Music education and community engagement ==
=== Educational programs ===
Groton Hill Music Center provides a comprehensive range of music education programs designed to serve students of all ages and skill levels. Instruction is available in both one-on-one settings and larger group classes. The center's faculty, comprising over 70 instructors, offers lessons in voice and more than 30 instruments, including violin, percussion, ukulele, and bucket drumming. The Center serves approximately 1,500 students annually.

The Center provides free professional development programs for local public school music and arts teachers, certified by the Massachusetts Department of Elementary and Secondary Education (DESE).

=== Community outreach ===
Groton Hill Music Center provides free music education and community engagement programs in collaboration with various local public schools and organizations with limited funding for music education. The Center also conducts free events such as concerts for senior citizens, bedside singing for hospice patients, after-school programs, and other public events. The Center offers free instrument lessons and awarding scholarships for private lessons, group classes, ensembles, and summer or school vacation programs for students who would not be otherwise be able to participate.

== Performances ==
=== In-house ensembles ===
- Vista Philharmonic Orchestra – the Center's in-house orchestra

=== Notable performances ===
- LeAnn Rimes – Country and pop artist
- Bruce Hornsby – Singer and songwriter
- Leslie Odom Jr. – Actor and singer
- Béla Fleck – Bluegrass artist and banjo player
- Yefim Bronfman – Classical pianist
- Danilo Perez – Jazz pianist
- Matthew Whitaker – Jazz and R&B musician.
- Emmanuel Ax – Classical pianist
- Alex Newell – Actor and singer
- Aoife O’Donovan – Singer and songwriter
- Don Was - Musician, bassist, record producer and Blue Note Records president
