= Groton Inn =

- U.S. National Register of Historic Places
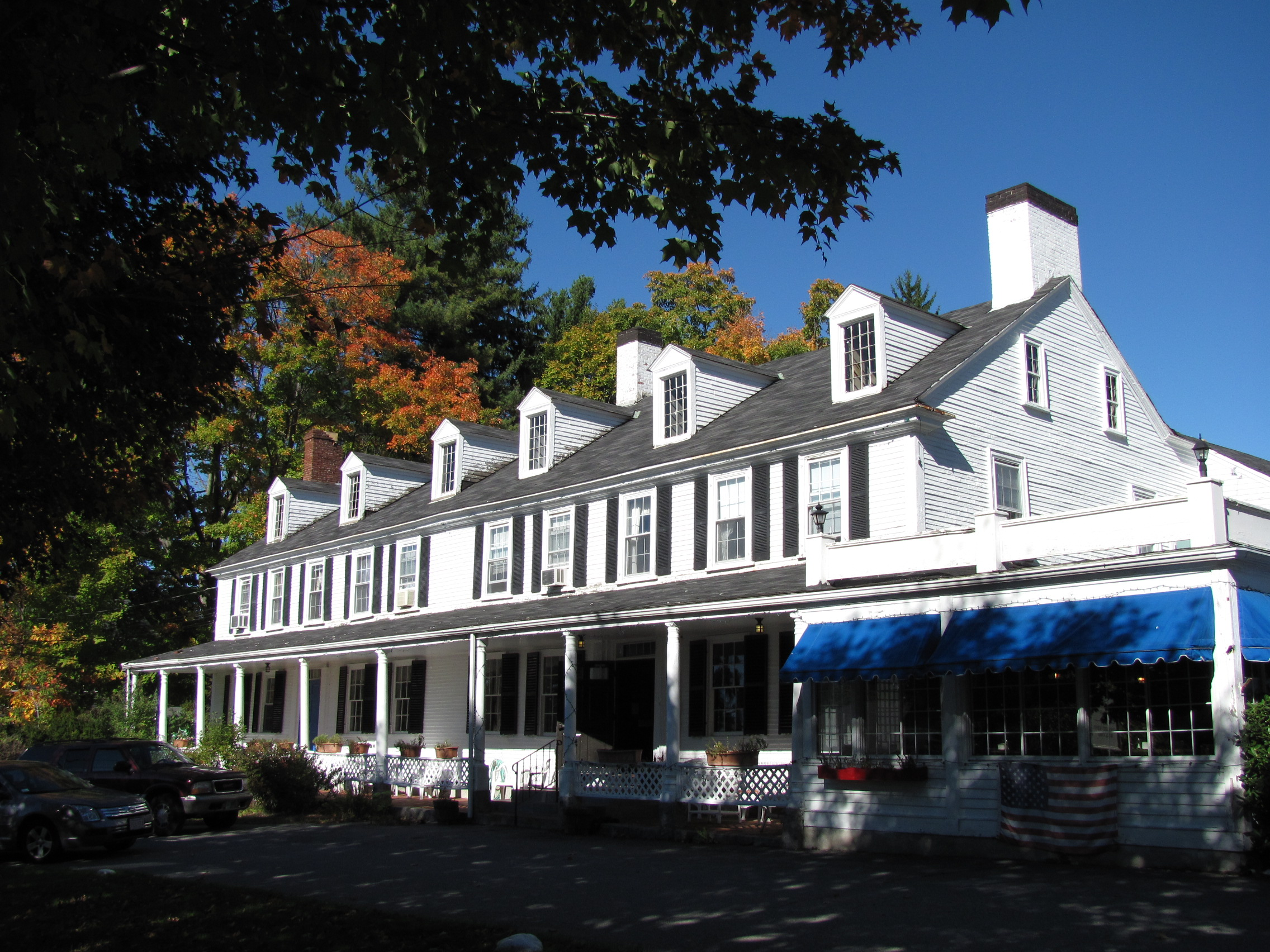
- Groton Inn

- Location within Massachusetts Location within the United States
- Location: Groton, Massachusetts
- Coordinates: 42°36′24″N 71°34′7″W
- Built: 1761
- NRHP reference No.: 76000241
- Added to NRHP: August 3, 1976

The Groton Inn is an inn at 128 Main Street in Groton, Massachusetts. Until 2011, it was an inn consisting of three historic structures, and was believed to be the oldest operating inn in the nation. The oldest structure was complete in 1678, making the inn the oldest in the United States. From 1797 until 1847 the inn served as a meeting place for St. Paul's Masonic Lodge, where Paul Revere was Grand Master. The building was added to the National Register of Historic Places in 1976. The inn was severely damaged by fire in August 2011. Attempts were made to save the front of the building, which was barely harmed compared to the rest of the structure, but the owners chose to demolish the inn in November 2011.

Local investors and residents proposed rebuilding the inn, and in 2017 construction began. Completed in April 2018, the inn is now a 60-room boutique hotel.

== See also ==
- National Register of Historic Places listings in Middlesex County, Massachusetts
