= Groton, Massachusetts =

- Town
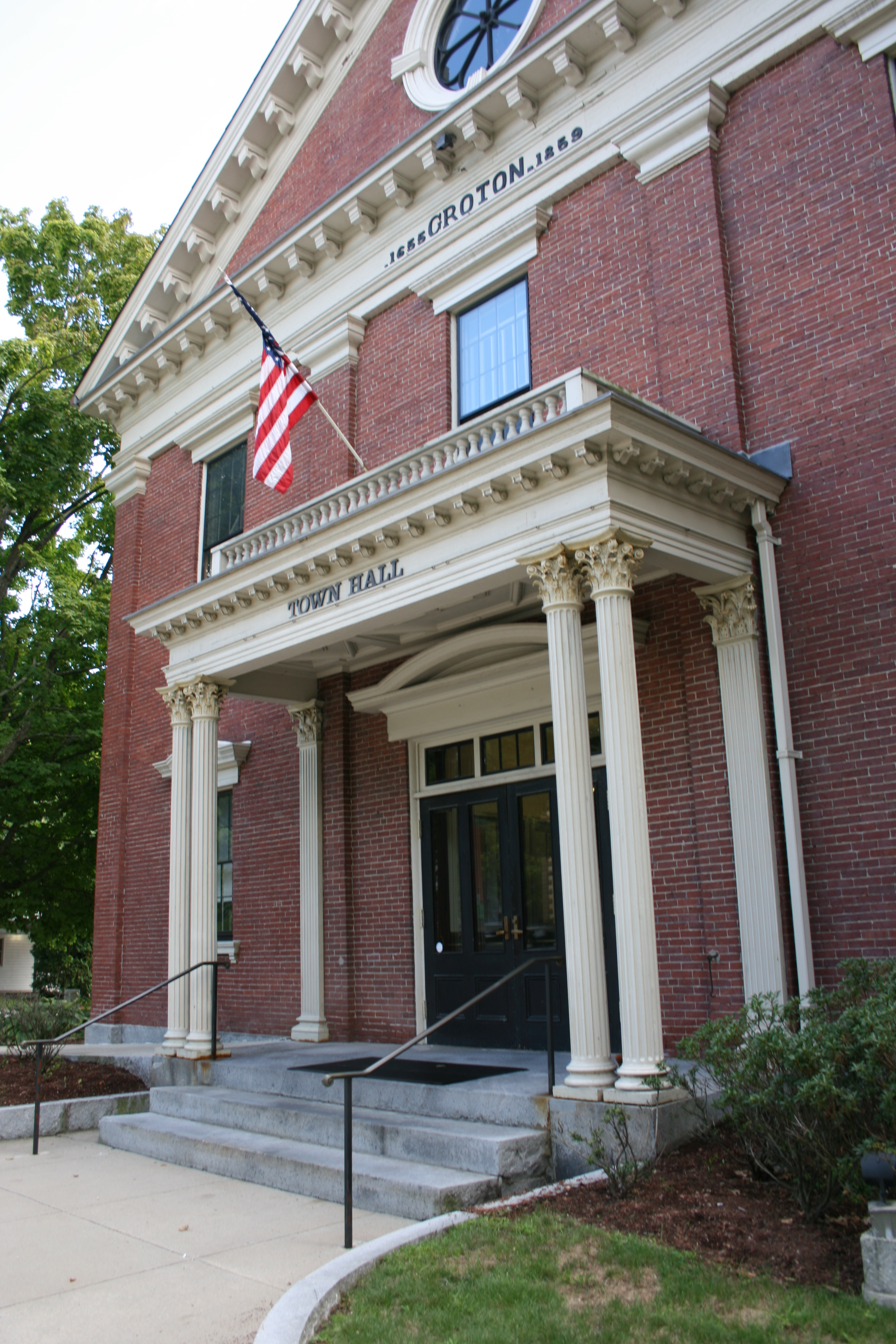
- Town Hall

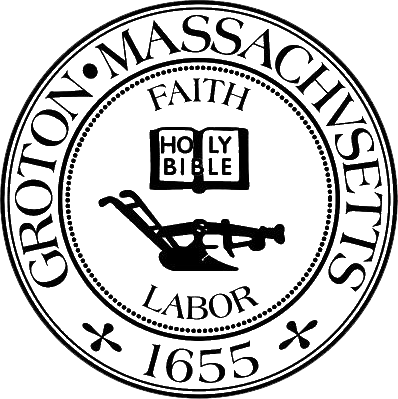
- Seal
- Motto(s): "All Are Welcome", "Faith, Labor"
- Location in Middlesex County in Massachusetts
- Coordinates: 42°36′40″N 71°34′30″W
- Country: United States
- State: Massachusetts
- County: Middlesex
- Settled: 1655
- Incorporated: 1655
- Named for: Groton, Suffolk, England

Government
  - Type: Open town meeting
  - Administrative Officer: Mark Haddad
  - Board of Selectmen: Peter Cunningham; Alison Manugian Rebecca "Becky" Pine Matthew Pisani John Reilly

Area
  - Total: 33.7 sq mi (87.3 km^{2})
  - Land: 32.8 sq mi (84.9 km^{2})
  - Water: 0.93 sq mi (2.4 km^{2})
- Elevation: 322 ft (98 m)

Population (2020)
  - Total: 11,315
  - Density: 345/sq mi (133/km^{2})
- Time zone: UTC−5 (Eastern)
  - Summer (DST): UTC−4 (Eastern)
- ZIP Code: 01450
- Area codes: 351/978
- FIPS code: 25-27480
- GNIS feature ID: 0619399
- Website: www.grotonma.gov

Groton is a town in northwestern Middlesex County, Massachusetts, United States, within the Greater Boston metropolitan area. The population was 11,315 at the 2020 census. It contains the census-designated place of the same name. An affluent bedroom community roughly 45 miles from Boston, Groton has a large population of professional workers, many of whom work in Boston's tech industry. It is loosely connected to Boston by highways (Route 2) and commuter rail (the MBTA Fitchburg Line).

The town has a long history dating back to the colonial era. It was a battlefield in King Philip's War and Queen Anne's War, and several Grotonians played notable roles in the American Revolution (including William Prescott, the American commander at the Battle of Bunker Hill) and Shays' Rebellion. Groton is home to two college-preparatory boarding schools: Lawrence Academy at Groton, founded in 1793; and Groton School, founded in 1884. Notable Groton residents include former U.S. Secretary of State John Kerry, sports writers Peter Gammons and Dan Shaughnessy, and NBC political correspondent Steve Kornacki.

== History ==
=== Early frontier settlement ===
The area surrounding modern-day Groton has, for thousands of years, been the territory of various cultures of indigenous peoples. They settled along the rivers, which they used for domestic tasks, fishing and transportation. Historic tribes were the Algonquian-speaking Nipmuc and Nashaway Indians, who established trails connecting the area to Massachusetts Bay.

The European presence in the era began when John Tinker established a trading post with the Nashaway tribe at the confluence of Nod Brook and the Nashua River. The Nashaway called the area Petapawag, meaning "swampy land." Over the years, more European settlers moved to the area, as it was productive for fishing and farming.

In 1655, the town of Groton was officially settled and incorporated by a group of selectmen including Deane Winthrop. The town was named for Groton in Suffolk, England, the hometown of Deane's father, the Massachusetts governor John Winthrop. Called The Plantation of Groton, it included all of present-day Groton and Ayer, almost all of Pepperell and Shirley, large parts of Dunstable, Littleton, and Tyngsborough, smaller parts of Harvard and Westford, and the New Hampshire towns of Nashua and Hollis.

During King Philip's War, when Native Americans tried to destroy the inhabitants, on March 13, 1676, Native Americans raided and burned all buildings except for four Groton garrisons. Among those killed was John Nutting, a Groton Selectman. Survivors fled to Concord and other safe havens. Two years later, many returned to rebuild. The rebuilt town was heavily militarized, and recorded a garrison of 91 men in 1692.

In 1694, Abenaki warriors attacked the town again during the Raid on Groton (during King William's War). Lydia Longley and two of her siblings were taken captive; the rest of their family was killed. Lydia was taken to Montreal where she was ransomed, converted to Catholicism, and joined the Congregation of Notre Dame, a non-cloistered order.

In 1704, during Queen Anne's War, an Abenaki raiding party kidnapped Matthias Farnsworth III from his home and brought him to Montreal.

In June 1707, Abenaki warriors abducted three children of the large family of Thomas Tarbell and his wife Elizabeth (Wood), cousins to the Longleys who were abducted in 1694. The raiders took them overland and by water to the Mohawk mission village of Kahnawake (also spelled Caughnawaga) south of Montreal. The two Tarbell boys, John and Zachariah, were adopted by Mohawk families and became fully assimilated. They later each married chiefs' daughters, had families, and became respected chiefs themselves. They were among the founders in the 1750s of Akwesasne, after moving up the St. Lawrence River from Kahnawake to escape the ill effects of traders. The brothers' older sister Sarah Tarbell was ransomed by a French family, and converted to Catholicism. Renamed as Marguerite, she followed Lydia Longley in joining the Congregation of Notre Dame, and served with them for the rest of her life. In the late nineteenth century, a plaque was installed about the Tarbell children at the site of the family's former farm in Groton. Descendants with the Tarbell surname are among the Mohawk living at Kahnewake and Akwesasne in the 21st century.

=== Revolutionary era and early republic ===
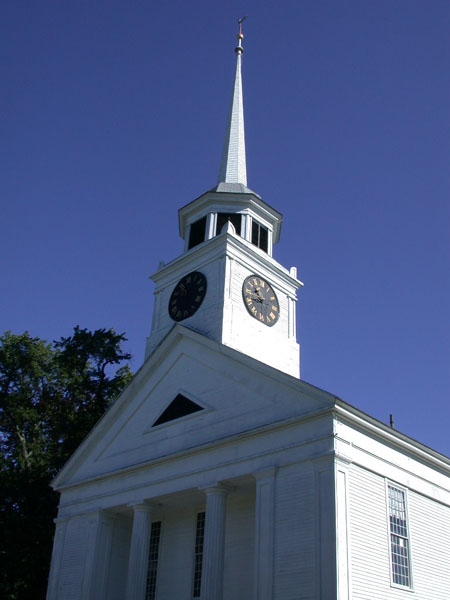
First Parish Church

The townsfolk of Groton supported the Patriot cause in the American Revolutionary War. Following the Boston Tea Party, the town passed a resolution thanking Boston "for their wise, prudent and spirited conduct at this alarming crisis," and resolved to boycott the tea industry until duties on tea were lifted.

In 1775, local minutemen assembled on the common in front of the First Parish Church of Groton before marching to the Battles of Lexington and Concord. Groton sent 101 men to the battle, but they arrived too late to participate. The American commander at the Battle of Bunker Hill, William Prescott, was born in Groton, and Groton lost 10 or 12 men at the battle, more than any other town.

This patriotic feeling did not last very long, and a majority of Groton residents aligned with the rebels during Shays' Rebellion. Job Shattuck, a former Continental Army officer and Groton's largest landowner, organized an early tax revolt in 1782. He escaped with a fine, but rose up again in 1786 and led a mob that shut down the Middlesex County Courthouse in Concord, Massachusetts. He was captured by a search party that included some pro-government Groton residents. He was sentenced to death but pardoned by Governor John Hancock.

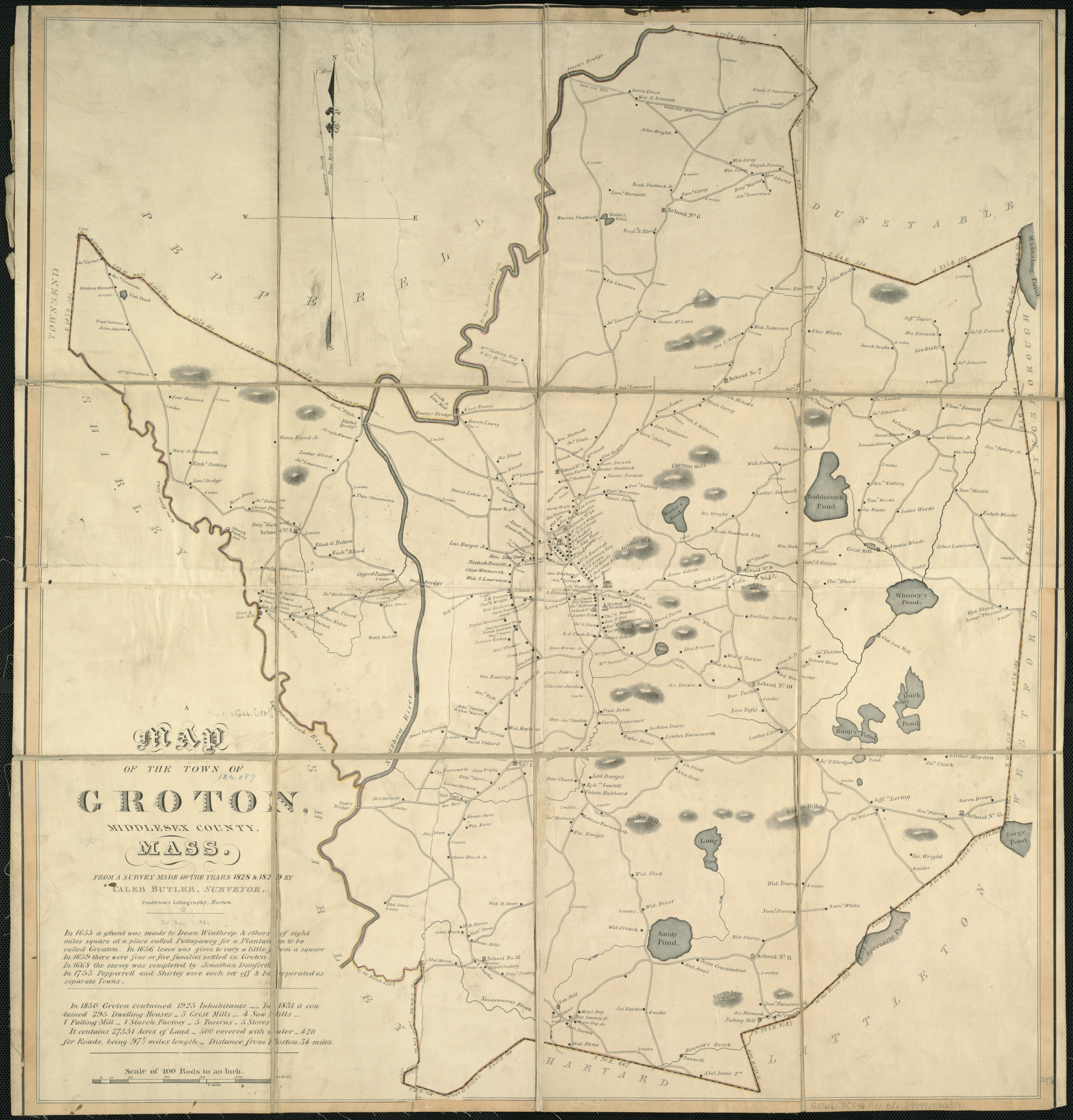
1831 map of Groton

Early Groton developed a strong economy, assisted by its location near the confluence of the Nashua and Squannacook Rivers. By 1790 it was the second-largest town in Middlesex County, with 1,840 residents. Agriculture was the backbone of the economy, but the town also welcomed industry. In the early 1800s, the Hollingsworth family (Hollingsworth & Vose) acquired a paper mill in West Groton. In 1828, miners discovered a large soapstone quarry; Groton eventually hosted the nation's largest soapstone factory, which exported products as far away as China. South Groton (Groton Junction, now Ayer) was connected to railroad lines in the 1840s. One line survives as the MBTA Fitchburg Line, the town's present-day commuter rail link to Boston.

African-Americans have lived in the area since at least the 1750s, when Primus Lew (father of Barzillai Lew) bought a farm in the area. Private Pomp Phillis was called up to fight at Lexington and Concord. Historian Jeremy Belknap wrote that "a negro man belonging to Groton" fired the shot that killed Major John Pitcairn at the Battle of Bunker Hill.

Starting in the 1840s, Catholic immigrants (mainly Irish, but also some French Canadians) began moving to the Nashoba Valley in large numbers. St. Mary's Catholic Church was established in 1858 to serve the Catholic residents of Ayer. Ayer split off from Groton in 1871, and in 1904, one of the local private schools donated Sacred Heart Church for the use of the Catholics who stayed in Groton proper.

=== Economic decline and social unrest ===
Groton's economic growth slowed in the second half of the nineteenth century. The soapstone quarry shut down in 1868. The town's population nearly halved (3,584 to 1,862) from 1870 to 1880, although most of this was due to the 1871 secession of Ayer, which had 1,600 residents in 1870.

In the 19th century and early part of the 20th century, Groton's population was largely white and Christian; people have debated whether it was a sundown town. The town became a center of the Second Ku Klux Klan, which was active in Massachusetts in the 1920s. This incarnation of the Klan expressed primarily anti-Catholic and anti-immigrant prejudice, while also opposing racial minorities. Local schoolmaster Endicott Peabody summarized the movement as follows: "There is an astonishing tendency among some of the respectable people in this part of the world to justify [the Klan's] existence on the ground that the Jews and Roman Catholics are taking possession of the country."

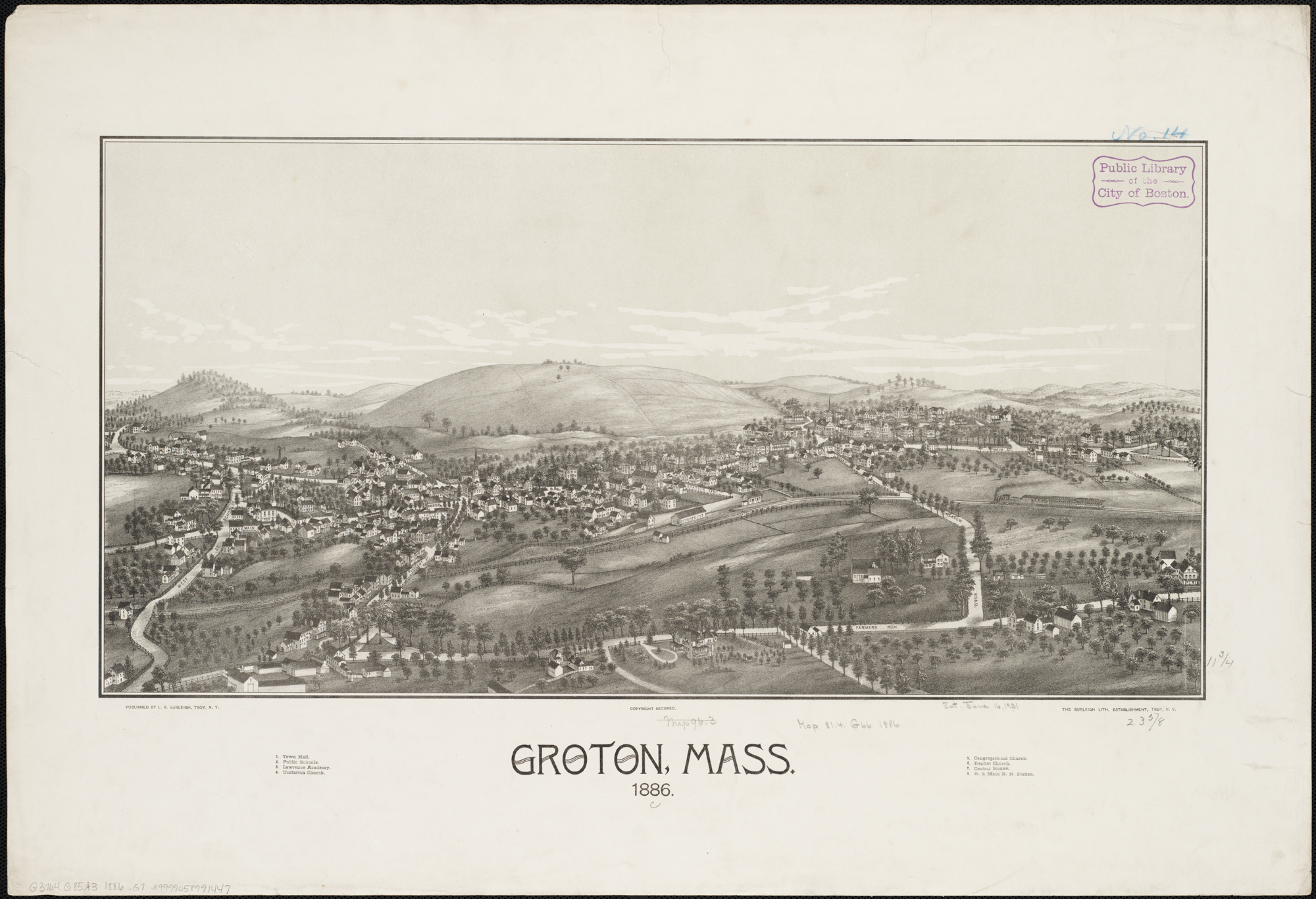
Lithograph of Groton from 1886 by L.R. Burleigh with list of landmarks

The Klan held a rally in Groton in September 1924. In 1925, an Irish resident reported a cross burning on Gibbet Hill, not far from Main Street. In October 1926, a group of 400 Klansmen were meeting in a field in the town when they were fired upon with guns used by a group of approximately 100 people opposed to the Klan; the police reported that over 100 gunshots were exchanged between the two groups, but no casualties were reported. In 1927, the local Klan chapter endorsed a full slate of candidates for the town elections, with partial success. The Klan appears to have peaked as an organized force in the area by 1931, when Klan head Hiram Wesley Evans visited West Townsend to implore the remaining Klansmen to rebuild the local chapters. The rate of inter-confessional marriages, which decreased significantly from 1924 to 1928, began rising again starting in 1929.

In 2020, Groton unanimously approved a measure denouncing racial bigotry and advocating equality in recognition of earlier violence and the contemporary social justice movement.

=== Economic revival ===
Starting in the 1950s, the town of Groton enjoyed an economic revival as Boston's high-tech sector expanded along the Route 128 beltway. Although Groton does not lie on Route 128, the gravity of the suburban beltway pulled exurban towns like Groton into Boston's economic orbit. The town attracted professional workers, and the population expanded rapidly, nearly quadrupling since 1950. (A group led by Marion Stoddart, the wife of one such technology worker, sponsored the cleanup of the Nashua River; previously, the river was so polluted with sludge that on some days, animals could run across it.) In 2021, Groton's per capita income ranked 32nd out of 341 towns and cities in Massachusetts. In addition, as of 2015, 31 Groton residents reported incomes over $1 million. Town representatives describe Groton as a "bedroom community" and "a relatively affluent town" where "[m]ost residents are well-educated and hold high-paying professional, managerial, or other office jobs."

In the 21st century, the town has sought to preserve its rural character and to slow population growth; as of 2017, 42% of the town's 32.5 square miles of land was permanently protected from development. In the 2000s, Geotel Communications founder Steven Webber purchased the 338-acre Gibbet Hill Farm to prevent residential development on the site; the town meeting reportedly greeted his intervention with a standing ovation. Town representatives state that they welcome tourists and seek to encourage "a constant trickle rather than a deluge of visitors." In 2017, the town adopted the motto "All Are Welcome" and placed six waystones engraved with the motto on the major roads entering the town.

Although the town's policies have successfully slowed population growth, town amenities have generally improved. Gibbet Hill now hosts a farm-to-table steakhouse. In 2017, the nation's largest Shirdi Sai Baba temple opened in Groton; it cost approximately $11 million to build. The 126,000-square-foot Groton Hill Music Center opened in 2022 and includes a 1,000-seat (expandable to 2,300) concert hall, a 300-seat secondary performance hall, a professional orchestra, and a community music school; it was the gift of an anonymous donor, posthumously revealed to be Sterilite owner Albert Stone. The Groton-Dunstable Regional School District is currently building a new $88.4 million campus for its elementary school, which is scheduled to open in 2024. However, the annual per-pupil expenditures in the 2022–23 school year were $19,392.35, just below the state average of $20,133.67, and in April 2024, voters rejected a proposed $7.6 million/3 year tax increase for the school district by a 3-to-2 margin.

== Geography ==
According to the United States Census Bureau, Groton has a total area of 33.7 square miles (87.3 km^{2}), of which 32.8 square miles (84.9 km^{2}) is land and 0.9 square miles (2.4 km^{2}) (2.79%) is water. Groton is the largest town in Middlesex County in terms of square mileage. The town is drained by the Nashua River, Squannacook River, and Merrimack River. The center of the town is dominated mainly by Gibbet Hill, with several other large hills throughout the town.

Groton is served by state routes 40, 111, 119 and 225. It borders the towns of Pepperell, Dunstable, Tyngsborough, Westford, Littleton, Ayer, Shirley, and Townsend.

Groton has a hot-summer humid continental climate (Dfa) bordering on Dfb and monthly averages range from 23.8 °F (−4.6 °C) in January to 71.8 °F (22.1 °C) in July. The hardiness zone is 5b.

== Demographics ==
Historical population
| Year | Pop. | ±% |
|---|---|---|
| 1676 | 300 | — |
| 1765 | 1,408 | +369.3% |
| 1776 | 1,639 | +16.4% |
| 1790 | 1,840 | +12.3% |
| 1800 | 1,802 | −2.1% |
| 1810 | 1,886 | +4.7% |
| 1820 | 1,897 | +0.6% |
| 1830 | 1,925 | +1.5% |
| 1840 | 2,139 | +11.1% |
| 1850 | 2,515 | +17.6% |
| 1860 | 3,193 | +27.0% |
| 1870 | 3,584 | +12.2% |
| 1880 | 1,862 | −48.0% |
| 1890 | 2,057 | +10.5% |
| 1900 | 2,052 | −0.2% |
| 1910 | 2,155 | +5.0% |
| 1920 | 2,185 | +1.4% |
| 1930 | 2,434 | +11.4% |
| 1940 | 2,550 | +4.8% |
| 1950 | 2,889 | +13.3% |
| 1960 | 3,904 | +35.1% |
| 1970 | 5,109 | +30.9% |
| 1980 | 6,154 | +20.5% |
| 1990 | 7,511 | +22.1% |
| 2000 | 9,547 | +27.1% |
| 2010 | 10,646 | +11.5% |
| 2020 | 11,315 | +6.3% |
| 2022* | 11,162 | −1.4% |
* = population estimate. Source: United States census records and Population Estimates Program data.

As of the census of 2020, there were 11,315 people, 3,668 households, and 2,757 families residing in the town. The population density was 335 inhabitants per square mile (129/km^{2}). There were 3,393 housing units at an average density of 103.5 per square mile (40.0/km^{2}). The racial makeup of the town was 84.9% White, 1.0% Black or African American, 0.0% Native American, 6.0% Asian, 0.0% Pacific Islander, 0.6% from other races, and 7.4% from two or more races. Hispanic or Latino of any race were 3.9% of the population.

There were 3,668 households, out of which 27.8% had children under the age of 18 living with them, 58.4% were married couples living together, and 26.9% were never married. Of all households 19.8% were made up of individuals, and 12.3% had someone living alone who was 65 years of age or older. The average household size was 2.96 and the average family size was 3.47.

The age distribution of the town's population was 72.3% age 18 and older, 6.5% from 20 to 24, 7.6% from 25 to 34, 13% 35–44, 12.1% from 45 to 54, 7.6% from 55 to 59, 7.7% from 60 to 64 and 14.7% who were 65–84 years of age. The median age was 40.4 years. For every 100 females, there were 102.5 males. For every 100 females age 18 and over, there were 96.8 males.

The median value of owner-occupied housing units was $673,500. The income for a household in the town was $189,180 and the median income for a family was $179,167. Males had a median income of $156,161 versus $99,750 for females. The per capita income for the town was $75,687. About 4.3% of the population were below the poverty line, including 2.0% of those under age 18 and 9.0% of those age 65 or over.

== Sports ==
Groton annually hosts the National Shepley Hill Horse Trials, an equestrian competition. The Groton-Dunstable Crusaders high school boys and girls athletic teams also compete in the town.

== Government ==
The town of Groton is governed by an open town meeting and administered by an elected five-member select board and appointed town manager.

The town has a large proportion of swing voters. 58.9% of Groton voters chose Republican Mitt Romney in the 2002 Massachusetts gubernatorial election, 55.0% chose Republican Scott Brown in the 2010 U.S. Senate election, and 53.8% chose Republican Charlie Baker in the 2014 Massachusetts gubernatorial election. By contrast, 50.8% of Groton voters chose Democrat Barack Obama in the 2012 U.S. presidential election, 63.9% chose Democrat Ed Markey in the 2020 U.S. Senate election, and 67.2% chose Democrat Joe Biden in the 2020 U.S. presidential election.

Voter Registration and Party Enrollment as of February 1, 2021
| Party | Number of Voters | Percentage |
|---|---|---|
| Democratic | 1,915 | 21.92% |
| Republican | 1,089 | 12.47% |
| Unaffiliated | 5,662 | 64.81% |
| Total | 8,736 | 100% |

== Education ==
=== Public schools ===
==== District schools ====
- Boutwell School
- Florence Roche Elementary School
- Groton-Dunstable Regional Middle School
- Groton-Dunstable Regional High School

==== Other public schools ====
- Nashoba Valley Technical High School, Public Regional Vocational Technical High School located in Westford

=== Private schools ===
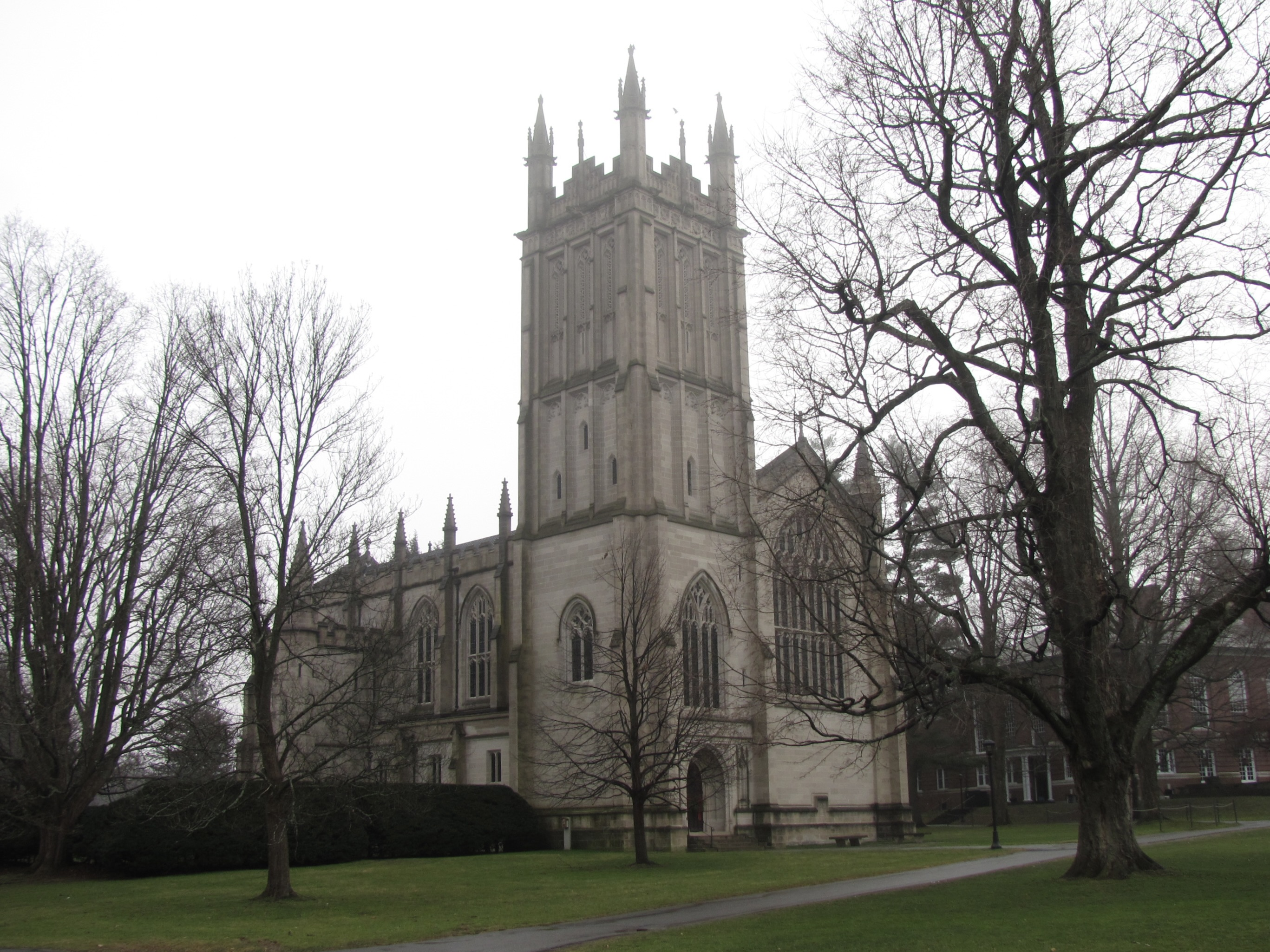
Groton School

- Groton Community School
- Lawrence Academy (founded 1793 as Groton Academy)
- Groton School (founded 1884)

Groton previously hosted Prescott Elementary School (1927–2008, now closed), the Catholic Country Day School of the Holy Union (1949–2017, now closed), and the Lowthorpe School of Landscape Architecture (1901–1945, merged with the Rhode Island School of Design). The old Groton High School building at 145 Main Street, which housed the Prescott Elementary School, is listed on the National Register of Historic Places.

== Points of interest ==
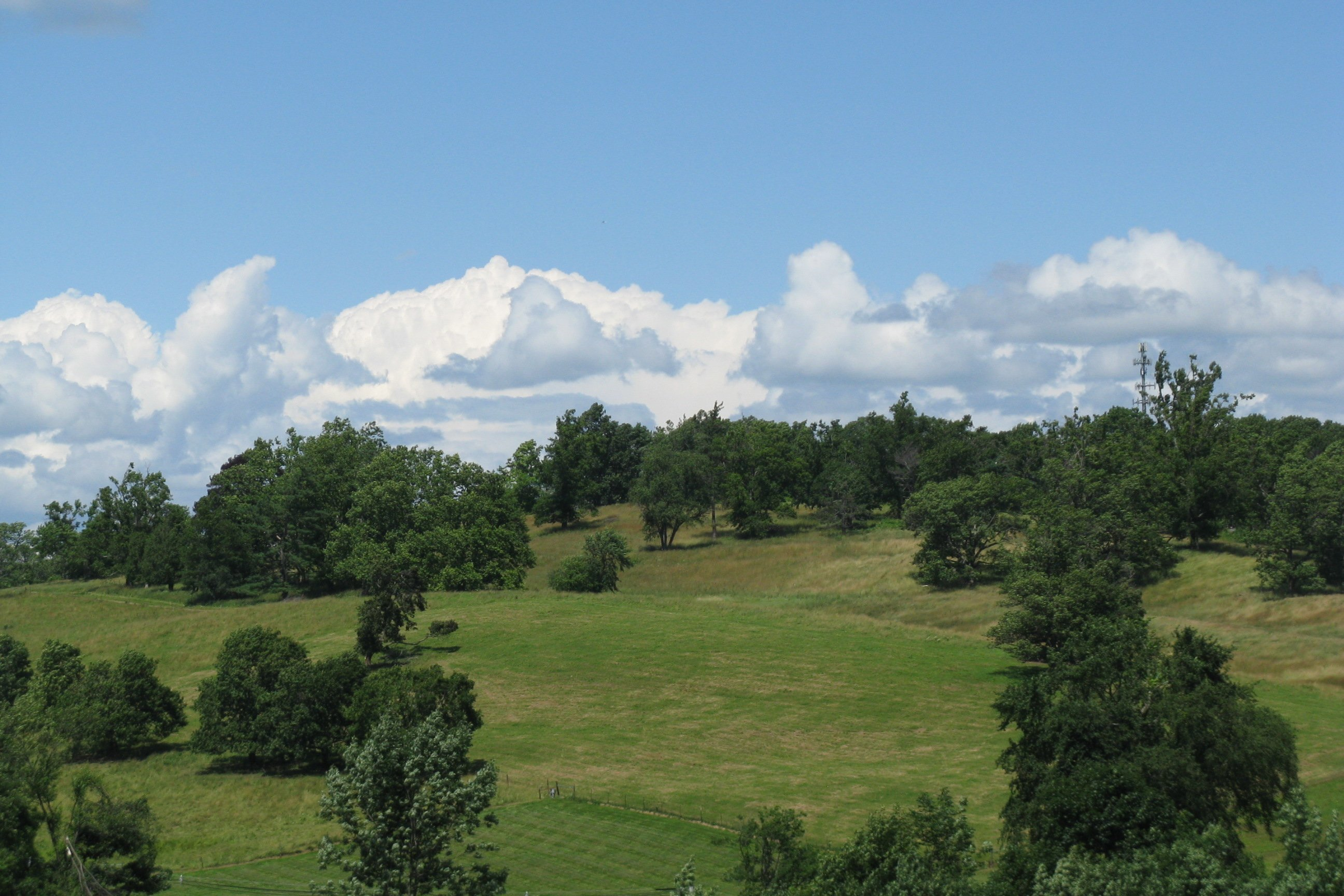
Gibbet Hill

- Groton Historical Society & Museum
- Groton Public Library
- Groton Hill Music Center
- Gibbet Hill Castle
- The Groton Inn
- Kalliroscope Gallery
- Autumn Hills Orchard
- Grotonwood Camp and Conference Center
- Groton School
- Lawrence Academy

== Buildings and structures ==
- Gov. George S. Boutwell House
- Indian Hill House
- Groton Inn, burned down on the night of August 2, 2011, rebuilding was completed in 2018 with the reopening in May.

== Conservation land ==
Over 30% of the land in Groton, Massachusetts is protected open space. The majority of this open space is accessible to the public. Groton also has over 100 miles of trails. Many of these trails can be walked and biked, others are available for hunting and/or camping. The trails are made and maintained by the Groton Trail Committee and the land itself is owned and managed by the Groton Conservation Trust, The Groton Conservation Commission, the Massachusetts Audubon Society, The New England Forestry Foundation, The Massachusetts Department of Conservation & Recreation, and The Massachusetts Department of Fish and Game.

== Notable people ==
=== Government and politics ===
- John P. Bigelow, mayor of Boston
- Timothy Bigelow, speaker of the Massachusetts House of Representatives
- George Sewall Boutwell, U.S. Secretary of the Treasury; Governor of Massachusetts; U.S. Senator; U.S. Representative
- Grafton D. Cushing, Lieutenant Governor of Massachusetts
- Samuel Dana, U.S. Representative
- Timothy Fuller, U.S. Representative
- Samuel Abbott Green, mayor of Boston
- Richard John Kerry, diplomat; father of John and Cameron Kerry
- John Kerry, U.S. Secretary of State
- Cameron Kerry, general counsel to the U.S. Department of Commerce
- William M. Richardson, U.S. Representative
- Ether Shepley, U.S. Senator (Maine)
- Charles Warren Stone, U.S. Representative
- Arthur H. Woods, New York City Police Commissioner

=== Military ===
- Barzillai Lew, early African-American soldier during the American Revolution
- Oliver Prescott, physician and Revolutionary-era militia general; co-founder of Lawrence Academy
- William Prescott, commander of U.S. forces at the Battle of Bunker Hill

=== Business ===
- Adolphus W. Green, founder of Nabisco
- Abbott Lawrence, businessman; founder of Lawrence, Massachusetts
- Amos Lawrence, merchant and philanthropist
- Amos Adams Lawrence, abolitionist; founder of the University of Kansas and Lawrence University
- Samuel Lawrence, revolutionary; co-founder of Lawrence Academy
- Simon Willard, colonist and fur trader

=== Religion ===
- Samuel Dana, clergyman
- Lucius Edwin Smith, journalist and theologian

=== Education ===
- Charles William Bardeen, educator and publisher
- Edward Saxton Payson, Esperantist, writer and translator
- Endicott Peabody, founder of Groton School and Brooks School
- L. Hugh Sackett, archaeologist
- Samuel Willard, acting president of Harvard University (1701–07)
- Frank Bigelow Tarbell, professor of art history at the University of Chicago

=== Journalism ===
- Margaret Fuller, journalist, critic and women's rights activist
- Peter Gammons, sportswriter
- Steve Kornacki, political writer and TV host
- Dan Shaughnessy, sportswriter and radio host

=== Art, sports, and entertainment ===
- Andy Anderson, rowing coach for the U.S. national team and Groton School; member of the National Rowing Hall of Fame
- Bill Camp, actor
- J. Geils, founder of The J. Geils Band
- Kevin Kastning, musician; composer; musical instrument inventor
- Paul Matisse, artist and inventor
- Shabazz Napier, basketball player
- Lawrence M. Noble, hockey player
- Shelley Olds, professional cyclist (2012 Summer Olympics)
- Otto Piene, artist
- Edmund C. Tarbell, artist
- Paul Zukauskas, football coach

=== Other ===
- Kristen Gilbert, serial killer
- Elizabeth Knapp, the Witch of Groton
- Lydia Longley, "The First American Nun"
- Job Shattuck, agitator during Shays' Rebellion

== See also ==
- List of sundown towns in the United States
