= Shepley Hill =

Summit in Massachusetts, United States

- Location within Massachusetts

Highest point
- Elevation: 351 ft (107 m)
- Coordinates: 42.61009°N 71.55923°W

Shepley Hill is a summit in the U.S. state of Massachusetts. The elevation is 351 feet (107 m).

The hill was named as early as the 1670s after the local Shepley family.
