= List of Groton School alumni =

The following is a list of notable alumni of Groton School.

== Note on sources ==
The first official school history, Frank D. Ashburn's Fifty Years On: Groton School, 1884–1934 (1934) (hereafter "Ashburn"), provides a complete list of Groton alumni (including students who did not graduate) through 1934, as well as a non-exhaustive list of some of the more notable alumni. (Note: Pages 165–78 contain a list of notable alumni. Pages 185–93 contain the full list of alumni.) Ashburn's companion book Peabody of Groton (2d ed. 1967) provides a more extensive list of notable alumni but does not provide the years of their graduation. Where possible, graduation dates for names listed solely in Peabody of Groton have been cross-referenced with the list of graduates in Fifty Years On; otherwise, a question mark has been placed next to the presumptive graduation year (that is, four years before the individual graduated from college).

The second official school history, Acosta Nichols' Forty Years More: A History of Groton School, 1934–1974, does not contain a list of famous alumni, but it does contain a list of trustees, alumni association presidents, and summa cum laude graduates, some of which became famous in their own right.

The school also awards "Distinguished Grotonian" and "Cui Servire" prizes and maintains an Athletic Hall of Fame; the web pages for these awards include the graduation years for other (generally more recent) alumni.

== Faculty ==
- Andy Anderson (1980–present), 1986 & 1987 world champion in lightweight women's fours (coach); member of the National Rowing Hall of Fame
- Julian Coolidge (1897–1900), professor of mathematics at Harvard University
- Grafton D. Cushing (1888–89, 1892–1906), lieutenant governor of Massachusetts
- J. Clark Grew II (1967–69), Episcopal bishop of Ohio
- Danielle Tumminio Hansen (2015–16), professor of theology at Emory University
- Henry Clay Hodges Jr. (1892–94), United States Army major general (39th Infantry Division during World War I)
- John Hoyt (1927–29), actor
- Celene Ibrahim (2019–present), Islamic scholar
- Richard J. Kerry (1944–45), diplomat; father of John Kerry
- Henry Goddard Leach (1903–05), professor of Scandinavian civilization at the University of Kansas
- Temba Maqubela (2013–present), headmaster
- Theodor E. Mommsen (1942–46), professor of medieval history at Cornell University
- Lawrence M. Noble (1932–66), hockey player
- Remsen B. Ogilby (1902–04), president of Trinity College, Hartford
- Endicott Peabody (1884–1940), founder and headmaster
- George W. Rickey (1930–33), sculptor
- L. Hugh Sackett (1955–61, 1963–2018), archaeologist
- Ellery Sedgwick '90 (1894–96), editor-in-chief of the Atlantic Monthly
- Charles L. Slattery (1894–96), Episcopal bishop of Massachusetts
- William Greenough Thayer (1886–87, 1889–94), headmaster of St. Mark's School
- Timothy L. Towell (1961–63), U.S. ambassador to Paraguay
- Arthur H. Woods (1893–1909), New York City police commissioner

== A ==
- David C. Acheson (1939), United States attorney for the District of Columbia
- Dean Acheson (1911), United States secretary of state; winner of the 1970 Pulitzer Prize for History
- J. Thayer Addison Jr. (1905), vice president of the National Council of the Episcopal Church; professor at Episcopal Theological School
- Frederick Lewis Allen (1908), editor-in-chief of Harper's; author of Only Yesterday
- Joseph Wright Alsop IV (1894), politician and insurance executive
- Joseph Wright Alsop V (1928), newspaper columnist
- Stewart Alsop (1932), newspaper columnist
- Ayi Kwei Armah (1960), writer
- Hugh Auchincloss (1967), immunologist; former acting director of the National Institute of Allergy and Infectious Diseases
- Hugh D. Auchincloss (1916), stockbroker and lawyer
- James C. Auchincloss (1904), United States congressman from New Jersey
- Louis Auchincloss (1935), author, winner of the National Medal of Arts

== B ==
- Stanton Babcock (1922), United States Army major general (VIII Corps; 2d Armored Division)
- Gaspar G. Bacon (1904), lieutenant governor of Massachusetts
- Robert L. Bacon (1903), United States congressman from New York
- C. Tracy Barnes (1929), CIA officer; helped plan the Bay of Pigs invasion
- Francis M. Bator (1943?), deputy United States National Security Advisor; professor of political economy at Harvard Kennedy School
- Paul M. Bator (1947?), deputy United States solicitor general; professor at Harvard Law School and the University of Chicago Law School
- Donald Beer (1953), 1956 Olympic gold medalist in men's eights (rowing)
- Francis Biddle (1905), United States attorney general; chief American justice of the Nuremberg trials
- George Biddle (1904), artist
- Hiram Bingham IV (1921), diplomat; helped Varian Fry evacuate Jews during the Holocaust
- Jonathan Brewster Bingham (1932), United States congressman from New York
- Richard M. Bissell, Jr. (1928), CIA deputy director for Plans; helped plan the Bay of Pigs Invasion and the U-2 spy plane
- William McCormick Blair Jr. (1936), United States ambassador to the Philippines and Denmark
- Edward "Pete" Bowditch Jr. (1899), aide-de-camp to General John J. Pershing during World War I; All-American football player at Harvard
- Archibald Manning Brown (1889), architect, notably the Harlem River Houses and the Brooklyn Children's Museum
- F. Gordon Brown Jr. (1900), one of only four four-time consensus All-American college football players; College Football Hall of Fame
- J. Carter Brown (1951), director of the National Gallery of Art
- James Bundy (1977), dean of the Yale School of Drama
- McGeorge Bundy (1936), United States National Security Advisor; dean of the Harvard Faculty of Arts and Sciences
- William Bundy (1935), foreign affairs advisor to Presidents Kennedy and Johnson
- George Butler (1962?), documentary filmmaker, notably Pumping Iron

== C ==
- Francis Cabot (1943), venture capitalist; founder of The Garden Conservancy; chairman of the New York Botanical Garden
- Bill Camp (1982), actor, notably The Queen's Gambit and The Night Of
- Cass Canfield (1915), book publisher; president of Harper and Row
- Henry Chauncey (1923), founder of Educational Testing Services
- Henry "Sam" Chauncey Jr. (1953), Yale University administrator
- Emory Clark (1956), 1964 Olympic gold medalist in men's eights (rowing)
- Ben Coes (1985), investor and novelist
- S. Sloan Colt (1910), chairman of the Port Authority of New York and New Jersey; chairman of Bankers Trust
- Hamilton Coolidge (1915), World War I flying ace
- Jim Cooper (1972), United States congressman from Tennessee
- Edwin Corning Sr. (1902), lieutenant governor of New York
- Erastus Corning 2nd (1928), mayor of Albany, New York
- Seymour Cromwell (1952), 1964 Olympic silver medalist and 1966 World Championship silver medalist in men's double sculls (rowing)
- Eliot Cross (1902), architect
- John Walter Cross (1896), architect
- Laurence Curtis (1912), United States congressman from Massachusetts
- Alexander Cushing (1932), founder of Squaw Valley Ski Resort (now Palisades Tahoe); host of the 1960 Winter Olympics
- Bronson M. Cutting (1906), United States senator from New Mexico
- C. Suydam Cutting (1908), explorer; first American to visit Lhasa
- W. Bayard Cutting Jr. (1895), diplomat

== D ==
- Daniel P. Davison (1943), president of the United States Trust Company
- F. Trubee Davison (1914), director of personnel for the Central Intelligence Agency; United States Army Air Corps brigadier general
- John Putnam Demos (1955), professor of history at Yale University
- Charlie Devens (1928), baseball player (New York Yankees)
- Benjamin Dibblee (1895), national championship-winning football coach and two-time All-American at Harvard
- C. Douglas Dillon (1927), United States Secretary of the Treasury; United States ambassador to France
- Allen Dines (1939?), speaker of the Colorado House of Representatives
- Henry Francis du Pont (1899), founder of the Winterthur Museum
- Frederick C. Dumaine Jr. (1920), president of Avis Rent-a-Car and the New York, New Haven and Hartford Railroad

== E ==
- Robert Wales Emmons Jr. (1890), sailor; captained the team that won the 1920 America's Cup

== F ==
- Isabelle Kinsolving Farrar (1998), sailing world champion in the 470 and International One Design competitions
- Ned Freed (1978?), co-author of the email attachment Internet standard (MIME RFCs 2045–2049)
- Vinton Freedley (1910), theater and television producer, notably Anything Goes

== G ==
- Ives Gammell (1911), artist
- Peter Gammons (1963), sportswriter; winner of the BBWAA Career Excellence Award
- Alex Gansa (1978), television producer, notably Homeland; two-time Emmy Award winner
- William Tudor Gardiner (1910), governor of Maine
- Sumner Gerard Jr. (1934), United States ambassador to Jamaica
- John B. Goodenough (1940), winner of the 2019 Nobel Prize in Chemistry (development of the lithium-ion battery)
- Ward Goodenough (1937), professor of anthropology at the University of Pennsylvania
- Maggie Goodlander (2005), U.S. House Representative from New Hampshire
- Marshall Green (1935), United States ambassador to Indonesia, Australia, and Nauru; United States Assistant Secretary of State for East Asian and Pacific Affairs; accompanied President Nixon on his 1972 visit to China
- Joseph Grew (1898), United States ambassador to Japan; secretary of the U.S. delegation at the Treaty of Versailles; Under Secretary of State
- Charles Grimes (1953), 1956 Olympic gold medalist in men's eights (rowing)
- Ashbel Green Gulliver (1915), dean of Yale Law School
- Gordon Gund (1957), principal owner of the Cleveland Cavaliers and San Jose Sharks
- Fred Gwynne (1944), actor, notably The Munsters and My Cousin Vinny

== H ==
- Frederick Hale (1892), United States senator from Maine
- Pierpont M. Hamilton (1916), United States Army Air Forces major general; recipient of the Medal of Honor
- Charles Barney Harding (1918), founder of Smith, Barney & Co.; chairman of the New York Stock Exchange; chairman of the New York Botanical Garden and the Arthritis Foundation
- William Barclay Harding (1926), chairman of Smith, Barney & Co.
- Huntington "Tack" Hardwick (1911), co-founder of the Boston Garden; All-American football player for Harvard; College Football Hall of Fame
- E. Roland Harriman (1913), railroad magnate and philanthropist
- W. Averell Harriman (1909), United States Secretary of Commerce; United States ambassador to the Soviet Union and the United Kingdom; governor of New York
- Percy Haughton (1895), four-time national championship-winning football coach at Harvard; College Football Hall of Fame
- Stuart Heintzelman (1895), United States Army major general; commandant of the United States Army Command and General Staff College
- Michael "Mick" Hely-Hutchinson (left 1943), 8th Earl of Donoughmore; head of Perdio Radio
- Stephen A. Higginson (1979), circuit judge of the U.S. Court of Appeals for the Fifth Circuit
- George Holding (1986), United States congressman from North Carolina; United States attorney for the Eastern District of North Carolina
- Dwight N. Hopkins (1972), professor at the University of Chicago Divinity School
- George Howe (1904), professor of architecture at Yale University

== I ==
- Christopher Isham (1971), investigative reporter

== J ==
- James Jackson (1900), businessman and Massachusetts State Treasurer
- Pierre Jay (1888), chairman of the Federal Reserve Bank of New York

== K ==
- Alexander Karwoski (2008), 2017 World Championship silver medalist in men's eights (rowing)
- Gregory G. Katsas (1982), circuit judge of the U.S. Court of Appeals for the D.C. Circuit
- Thomas Forrest Kelly (1960), professor of music at Harvard University
- Francis Keppel (1934), United States Commissioner of Education; dean of the Harvard Graduate School of Education
- David Key (1918), United States ambassador to Burma
- Howard Kingsbury (1922), 1924 Olympic gold medalist in men's eights (rowing)
- Peter Kunhardt (1971), documentary filmmaker

== L ==
- Oliver La Farge (1920), anthropologist and novelist, notably Laughing Boy; winner of the 1930 Pulitzer Prize for Fiction
- Christopher Landau (1981?), United States deputy secretary of state and ambassador to Mexico
- Charles Lawrance (1901), aeronautical engineer; engine designer for Charles Lindbergh's first transatlantic flight
- James Lawrence (1925), rower; participated in the 1928 Summer Olympics (men's coxed fours)
- Hunter Lewis (1965), author; founder of Cambridge Associates
- George C. Lodge (1945), professor at Harvard Business School
- George deForest Lord (1938), professor of English literature at Yale University
- Samuel K. Lothrop (1911), anthropologist at the Peabody Museum

== M ==
- Lincoln MacVeagh (1909), United States ambassador to Spain, Portugal, Greece, Yugoslavia, South Africa, and Iceland
- W. Kingsland Macy (1908), United States congressman from New York
- Greg Maffei (1978), CEO of Liberty Media
- Peter Magowan (1959), managing general partner, San Francisco Giants
- Liane Malcos (1996), 2003 World Champion in women's coxless fours (rowing)
- Harry Mathews (1947), writer
- Brooks McCormick (1936?), CEO of International Harvester
- Joseph Medill McCormick (1895), United States Senator from Illinois
- Robert R. McCormick (Form of 1899; did not graduate), publisher of the Chicago Tribune; founder of Kirkland & Ellis LLP
- Walter Russell Mead (1969), Henry A. Kissinger Chair at the Council on Foreign Relations
- Sam Mercer (1973), film producer; head of Industrial Light & Magic
- Abbot Low Moffat (1919), diplomat, politician, and attorney
- Jay Pierrepont Moffat (1913), United States ambassador to Canada
- Jay Pierrepont "Peter" Moffat Jr. (1949), United States ambassador to Chad
- Henry Sturgis Morgan (1919), founder of Morgan Stanley
- Henry Sturgis Morgan Jr. (1942), United States Navy rear admiral
- John Adams Morgan (1949), 1952 Olympic gold medalist in the International Six Metre Class (sailing)
- A. Newbold Morris (1921), president of the New York City Council; New York City Parks Commissioner
- George L. K. Morris (1924), painter
- Daniyal Mueenuddin (1981), author
- Henry A. Murray (1911), professor of psychology at Harvard University; developer of the Thematic Apperception Test (TAT)
- Justin Muzinich (1996), United States Deputy Secretary of the Treasury

== N ==
- Candace Nelson (1991), founder of Sprinkles Cupcakes
- Garrison Norton (1919), United States Assistant Secretary of the Navy

== O ==
- William H. Orrick III (1971), district judge of the U.S. District Court for the Northern District of California
- H. Fairfield Osborn Jr. (1905), conservationist; president of the New York Zoological Society and the Conservation Foundation

== P ==
- J. Graham Parsons (1925), United States ambassador to Laos and Sweden; deputy U.S. representative to Strategic Arms Limitation Talks
- Herbert Parsons Patterson (1942?), president of Chase Manhattan Bank
- Joseph Medill Patterson (1896), founder of the New York Daily News; father of the tabloid newspaper
- Ted Patton (1984), 1987 world champion and 1988 Olympic bronze medalist in men's eights (rowing)
- Alexandra Paul (1981), actress, notably Baywatch
- Endicott Peabody II (1938), governor of Massachusetts; College Football Hall of Fame
- Malcolm Endicott Peabody (1907), Episcopal bishop of Central New York
- George W. Pierson (1922), professor of history at Yale University
- Frank Polk (1890), United States Under Secretary of State under Woodrow Wilson; attorney, Davis Polk & Wardwell LLP
- Fuller Potter (1929), artist
- Norman Prince (1905), pilot; founder of the Lafayette Escadrille during World War I
- Eben W. Pyne (1935), commissioner of the Metropolitan Transportation Authority

== R ==
- Christopher Rand (1930), journalist and travel writer
- Samuel Reber (1921), United States Deputy High Commissioner for Germany after World War II
- Stanley Rogers Resor (1935), United States Secretary of the Army and Under Secretary of Defense for Policy
- Warren D. Robbins (1904), United States ambassador to Canada and El Salvador
- Archibald Roosevelt (Form of 1914; did not graduate), United States Army officer
- Archibald Bulloch Roosevelt Jr. (1936), CIA officer; linguist
- Elliott Roosevelt (1929), United States Army Air Corps brigadier general; mayor of Miami Beach, Florida
- Franklin Delano Roosevelt (1900), 32nd president of the United States
- Franklin Delano Roosevelt Jr. (1933), United States congressman from New York; chairman of the Equal Employment Opportunity Commission
- James Roosevelt (1926), United States congressman from California; United States Marine Corps brigadier general
- Kermit Roosevelt (1908), explorer; visited the Amazon Basin, the Himalayas, and Southeast Asia
- Kermit Roosevelt Jr. (1934), CIA officer; organized Operation Ajax
- Quentin Roosevelt (1915), United States Army Air Service pilot; only child of a U.S. president to have died in combat
- Quentin Roosevelt II (1937?), grandson of President Theodore Roosevelt; killed in a plane crash in China under mysterious circumstances
- Theodore Roosevelt III (sometimes called Theodore Jr.) (1906), United States Army brigadier general; led the D-Day assault on Utah Beach; Medal of Honor recipient; governor-general of the Philippines; governor of Puerto Rico
- Theodore Roosevelt IV (1932?), Pennsylvania Secretary of Commerce
- Theodore Roosevelt V (1961), investment banker; conservationist; U.S. Navy SEAL; U.S. Foreign Service officer
- George Rublee (1886), first graduate of Groton School; commissioner of the Federal Trade Commission; former name partner of Covington & Burling LLP
- Tom Rush (1959), folk and blues musician

== S ==
- Robert C. Scott (1965), United States congressman from Virginia
- Ellery Sedgwick (1890), editor of the Atlantic Monthly
- Sarah Sewall (1979), director of the Carr Center for Human Rights Policy at Harvard Kennedy School
- Frederick Sheffield (1920), 1924 Olympic gold medalist in men's eights (rowing)
- Curtis Sittenfeld (1993), author
- James Hopkins Smith Jr. (1927), United States Assistant Secretary of the Navy (AIR); 1948 Olympic gold medalist in 6-meter (sailing)
- F. Gilman Spencer (did not graduate), newspaper editor; winner of the 1974 Pulitzer Prize for Editorial Writing
- Robert Stallman (1964), musician
- Paul Stewart (1972), NHL player and referee
- Gerry Studds (1955), United States congressman from Massachusetts; first openly gay member of Congress
- Joseph Rockwell Swan (1898), senior partner at Smith, Barney & Co.; national championship-winning football coach at Yale

== T ==
- David Thorne (1962), investment adviser; United States ambassador to Italy; president of the Boston Institute of Contemporary Art
- John Train (1946), investment adviser; editor of The Paris Review
- Sandy Treadwell (1964?), Secretary of State of New York

== V ==
- Cyrus Vance, Jr. (1973), Manhattan district attorney
- Andrés Velasco (1978), Finance Minister of Chile; dean of the School of Public Policy at the London School of Economics
- Nicholas Vreeland (1972), Buddhist monk

== W ==
- George Herbert Walker III (1949), United States ambassador to Hungary; board member of the New York Stock Exchange
- H. Bradford Washburn Jr. (1929), director of the Boston Museum of Science
- Sherwood Washburn (1931), professor of anthropology at the University of California, Berkeley
- Sam Waterston (1958), actor, notably Law & Order's Jack McCoy
- Franklin C. Watkins (1910?), painter
- J. Griswold Webb (1909), New York State Senator
- J. Watson Webb (1903), insurance executive; polo player
- J. Watson Webb, Jr. (1934), film editor
- Sumner Welles (1910), United States Under Secretary of State
- James Boyd White (1956), professor at the University of Michigan Law School; founder of the Law and Literature movement
- Cornelius Vanderbilt Whitney (1917), investor and film producer, notably The Searchers
- Harry Payne Whitney (1894), businessman; horse breeder; polo player
- John Hay Whitney (1922), United States ambassador to Great Britain; president of the Museum of Modern Art; publisher of the New York Herald Tribune
- Richard Whitney (1907), president of the New York Stock Exchange; pleaded guilty to embezzlement in 1938
- William Payne Whitney (1894), philanthropist and businessman
- William Woodward Sr. (1894), president of Hanover National Bank; president of the United States Jockey Club; breeder of Triple Crown-winning racehorses Omaha and Gallant Fox

== Y ==
- Jonathan Yardley (1957), literary critic for the Washington Post and the Washington Star; winner of the 1981 Pulitzer Prize for Criticism

== Z ==
- Yiyang Zhuge, popular Chinese podcaster
