= John Lennon's psychedelic Rolls-Royce =

1967 art car

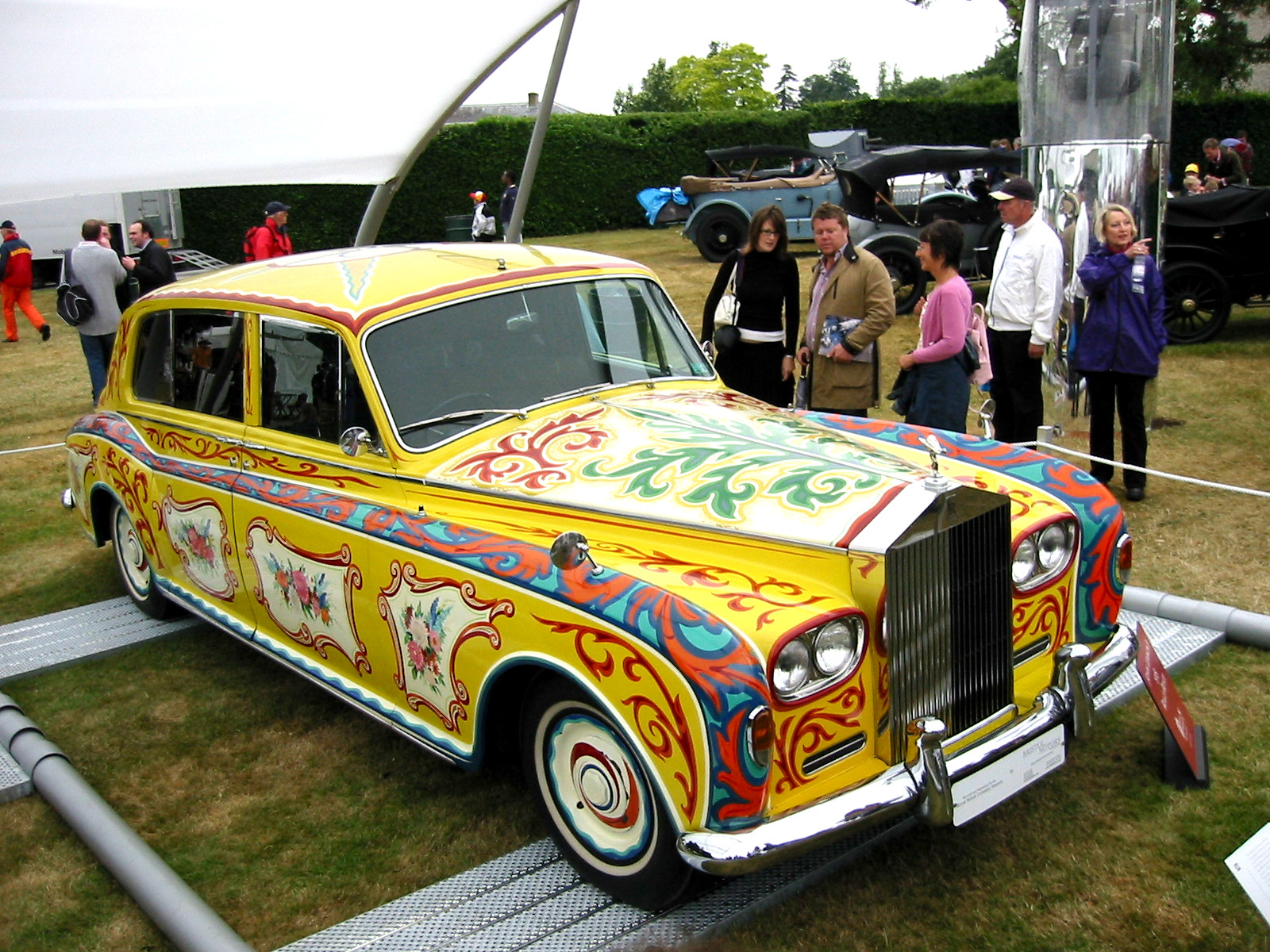
John Lennon's psychedelic Rolls-Royce

John Lennon's psychedelic Rolls-Royce is an art car created in 1967 and later displayed in many museums.

After previously owning a used Rolls-Royce, John Lennon of the Beatles ordered a new bespoke Rolls-Royce Phantom V limousine in December 1964. Originally painted matte black, the car was delivered six months later in June 1965. When Lennon was in Spain filming How I Won the War in 1966, the car was damaged, including scuffing of its finish. Lennon decided to have the car repainted bright yellow and decorated with motifs from Romany decorative arts. Artist Steve Weaver embellished the car with elaborate, bright swirls and floral motifs in the psychedelic style associated with the Beatles in that era, and the vehicle became a sensation.

Lennon and his wife Yoko Ono donated it to the Cooper-Hewitt Museum for a tax deduction in 1977, and it has been widely exhibited ever since. When sold in 1985, it was the most expensive automobile ever to be auctioned at that time. The limousine is now owned by the Royal British Columbia Museum in Victoria, British Columbia.

== Background ==
The Beatles were formed in Liverpool in 1960, and by 1962, their line-up was solidified when Ringo Starr joined the band. Beatlemania began in the United Kingdom in 1963, and rapidly spread to the United States and then worldwide in 1964, and all the members of the band quickly became very wealthy.

John Lennon purchased a used black and maroon Rolls-Royce limousine in July 1964. By December, he decided to buy a new one.

== Original purchase ==
In December 1964, Lennon ordered the Phantom V from R.S. Mead Ltd, a dealer located in Maidenhead. The Phantom V was the most expensive Rolls-Royce model at that time. The chassis was built in Crewe, Cheshire, and the carriage work was done by Mulliner Park Ward, a Rolls-Royce subsidiary in Willesden.

The finished car was delivered 3 June 1965, at R.S. Mead. It is nineteen feet ten inches (6.05 m) long, six feet seven inches (2.01 m) wide, and weighs almost three metric tons (3.0 long tons; 3.3 short tons). "Traditional amenities" included "the 6.23-litre V8 engine, black leather upholstery, cocktail cabinet with fine wood trim, writing table, reading lamps, a seven-piece his-and-hers black-hide luggage set, and a Perdio portable television." Unusual features included a refrigerator in the trunk (boot) and tinted windows. All exterior parts of the vehicle were painted matte black, except for the distinctive chrome Rolls-Royce grille, which the company was not willing to produce in black. Lennon did not have a driving licence when he ordered the car but got it within a few months. He was a poor driver, though, and hired Les Anthony as his driver and bodyguard. The Beatles rode the limousine to Buckingham Palace on 26 October 1965, to receive their MBE honours from Queen Elizabeth II.

== First renovation in December 1965 ==
In December 1965, Lennon wrote a seven-page memo describing various modifications to the Rolls-Royce that he wanted. A new back seat was installed that could be converted into a double bed, and large ashtrays were installed in the armrests. A Philips "floating" record player was installed, that had a suspension system "that prevented the needle from jumping when the car was in use." A Philips 8-track tape player, an upgraded Sony TV set and a bulky radio telephone were also installed. Lennon was particularly fond of the new public address system, which allowed him to shout out to passersby, and play various sound effects.

== Second renovation, April–May 1967 ==
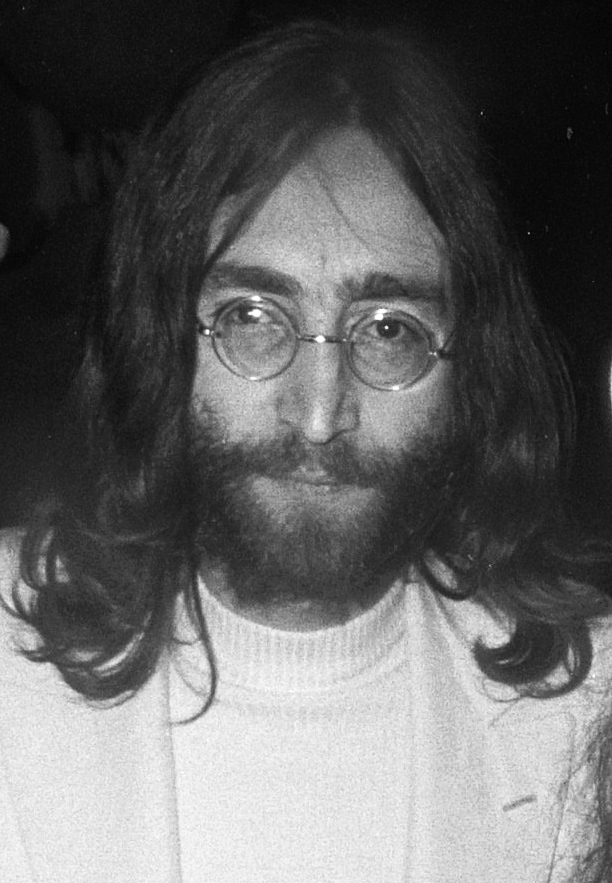
John Lennon in 1969

In late 1966, Lennon spent six weeks acting in the film How I Won the War, much of which was filmed on location in Almería, Spain. Les Anthony drove the Rolls-Royce to and from Spain. While in Spain, Lennon frequently spent extended periods of spare time sitting in the back of the car, smoking marijuana and working on the song that became the hit single "Strawberry Fields Forever". Roads in the area were in poor condition and very sandy. As a result, the car's exhaust pipes, undercarriage and matte black paint job were damaged. The structural damage was repaired quickly, but Lennon devoted more time to planning the repainting, which was inspired in part by the artwork associated with Sgt. Pepper's Lonely Hearts Club Band. Accounts differ as to who gave Lennon the idea, with some crediting Ringo Starr and others Dutch designer of psychedelic art, Marijke Koger. Koger and her associates in the design collective "The Fool" had previously repainted a gypsy caravan that Lennon purchased as a birthday gift for his young son Julian.

On 8 April 1967, Lennon visited J.P. Fallon Ltd. to make design decisions. The car was sprayed bright yellow using latex paint. Steve Weaver was the artist who painted the ornate decorations. Weaver charged £290 (equivalent to £4,621 in 2025) for the job, and the car was ready to be picked up on 25 May, the day before the release of the widely acclaimed album, Sgt. Pepper's Lonely Hearts Club Band. The driver Anthony said, "The first time I drove it, I was followed by hordes of photographers and Pathé news".

The car's inaugural voyage was on 28 May, when Lennon and eight friends were driven to an album release and housewarming party at the new home of Brian Epstein, where the Sgt. Pepper's album was played interspersed with Procol Harum and their hit single "A Whiter Shade of Pale", which had been released two weeks earlier.

Lennon delighted in telling an anecdote about how an older woman had lost her temper upon seeing the psychedelic Rolls-Royce, saying, according to Lennon, "You swine! How dare you do that to a Rolls-Royce!", and how she had struck the car with her umbrella.

In 1968, Lennon purchased another Phantom V, this one painted white. In 1970, Lennon and his second wife, Yoko Ono, moved the car from London to New York.

The car appeared at Lennon's 31st birthday party in Syracuse, New York, in October 1971, and was loaned out to other musicians including Elton John and Bob Dylan and members of bands such as the Rolling Stones and the Moody Blues.

== Critical reception ==
Rolling Stone described the design in 2017 as a "lurid Romany floral/zodiac hybrid", adding that the design consisted of "red, orange, green and blue art nouveau swirls, floral side panels and Lennon's astrological symbol, Libra, on the roof" painted on a background that the Daily Mail described as "shrieking yellow". The Royal BC Museum described the design in 2019 as "Romany Gypsy style, with elements of the psychedelic era." British GQ called its base also in 2019 "a shade of not-so-mellow yellow" and finished with "a combo of Romany swirls, floral motifs and a zodiac sign for good measure." In 2020 Montecristo magazine in Vancouver described "its bright chrome yellow body and floral side panels of dahlias and delphiniums", adding "Its bonnet and boot are decorated with colourful curlicue scrollwork, and its roof sports a stylized symbol of Libra, the zodiac sign of its first owner." In 2020 CTV News called it a "classic car of epic proportions" and "art on wheels" describing its "bright, Romany-inspired floral design" and quoted a museum curator calling it a "magical object". in 2022 HotCars in Quebec called it "probably one of the most famous art cars ever made".

== Donation, auction and subsequent ownership ==
In December 1977, Lennon and Ono donated the limousine to the Cooper-Hewitt Museum, a Manhattan branch of the Smithsonian Institution, for a $250,000 tax credit. Lennon was murdered in December 1980. As late as 1987, Ono and the estate of John Lennon were disputing the size of the tax credit with the Internal Revenue Service, which repeatedly claimed that the car was worth no more than $100,000 when it was donated.

In June 1985, the Cooper-Hewitt Museum decided to sell the car, which was auctioned by Sotheby's in New York, and it was purchased by Canadian businessman Jim Pattison for US$2,299,000. According to Sotheby's, this was the highest auction price for a car at that time. Pattison used it to promote Expo 86 in Vancouver. In 1987, Pattison donated the car to the Province of British Columbia, where it was exhibited at the Transportation Museum of British Columbia until 1993. It was then transferred to the Royal British Columbia Museum, and has remained the property of that institution ever since.

== Exhibitions ==
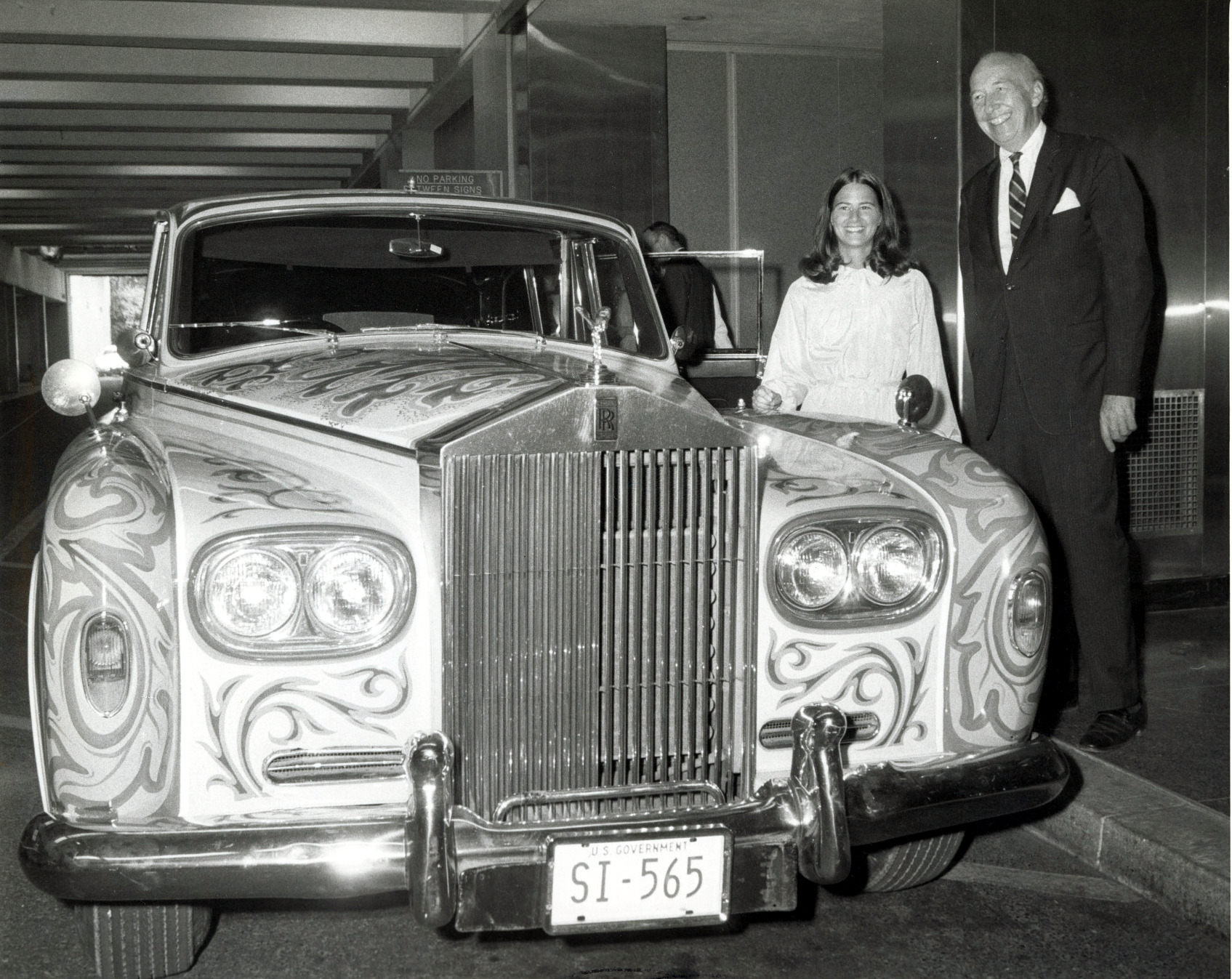
Sidney Dillon Ripley from the Smithsonian and Caron Carter, daughter-in-law of Jimmy Carter, in 1978

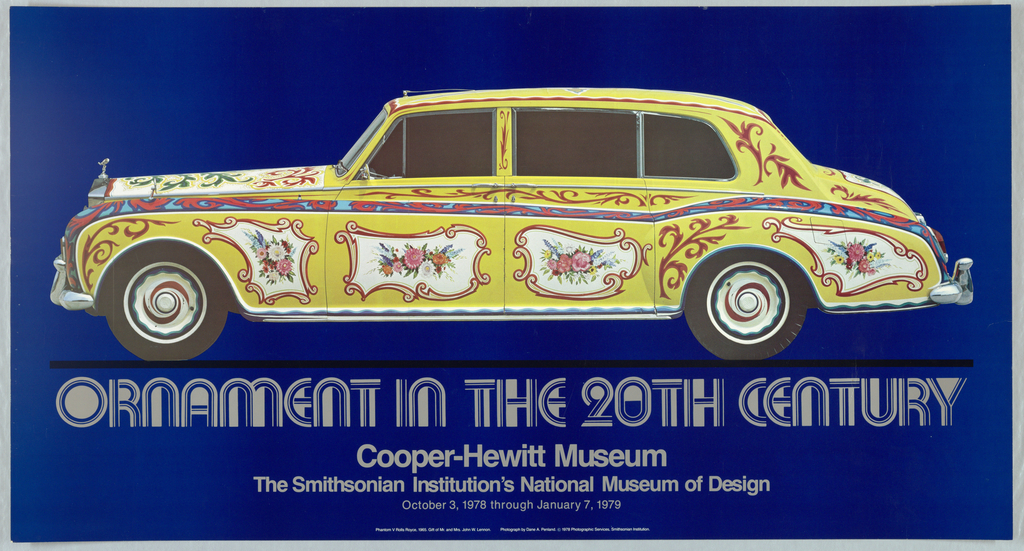
"Ornament in the 20th Century" Exhibition Poster, 1978–1979

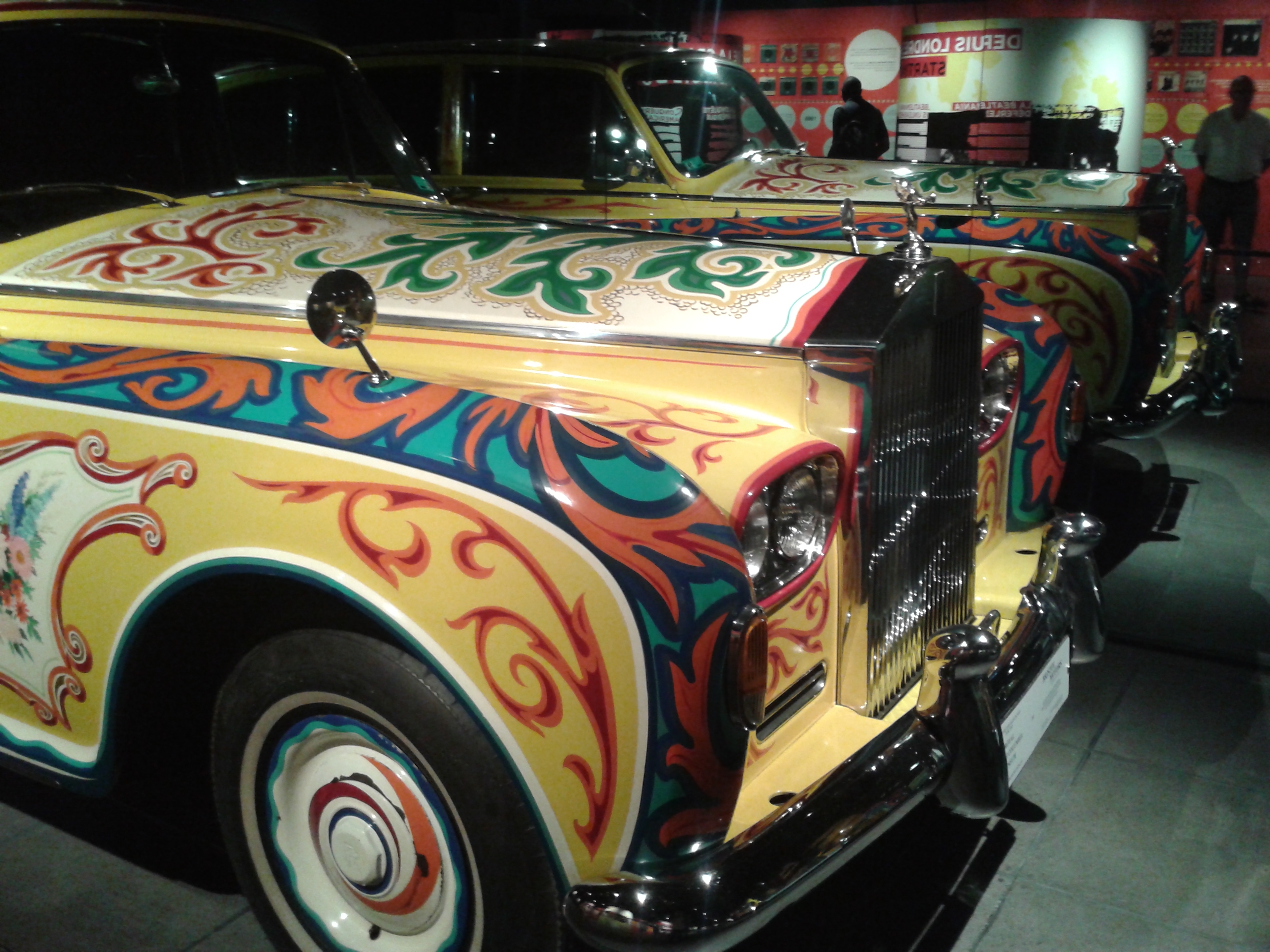
At the Pointe-à-Callière Museum in Montréal, 2013

The vehicle was briefly displayed at the National Museum of History and Technology, now known as the National Museum of American History, in 1978. The car was then shown at the "Ornament in the 20th Century" exhibit at the Cooper-Hewitt Museum in New York, held from October 1978 to January 1979.

After Pattison bought the car in 1985, he showed it at several Ripley's Believe it or Not! Museums that he owned, and then displayed it at Expo 86. He then donated the vehicle to the Province of British Columbia.

The vehicle was exhibited from March 2013 to March 2014 in Montréal, at the Pointe-à-Callière Museum, as part of an exhibition called "The Beatles in Montréal".

In 2015, it was shown at the Pacific National Exhibition in Vancouver for the "Magical Mystery Tour: A Beatles Memorabilia Exhibition". In July and August 2017, Lennon's psychedelic limousine was part of "The Great Eight Phantoms", an exhibition of Rolls-Royces at Bonhams in London.

Except when it is loaned out for exhibits elsewhere, the car is often displayed by the Royal British Columbia Museum.

== Maintenance ==
The yellow base coat applied to the car is a common latex house paint as opposed to an automotive-grade paint. As a result, the paint is very fragile, and museum curators are very cautious when caring for the vehicle. They never use polishing cloths on the painted surfaces, and touch up any minor paint losses with tiny brushes. According to the Royal British Columbia Museum, "in order to maintain the moving parts, the Royal BC Museum must run the vehicle at least once a year. Each time the vehicle is moved, doors and hoods opened or closed, and the engine vibrates, the paint is put at risk. Care for the John Lennon Rolls-Royce has been a delicate balancing act between keeping the moving parts in order and preserving the delicate paint."

The car had been stored for long periods without proper maintenance, which resulted in old fuel clogging the carburetors. After the fuel system was cleaned and some electrical and brake system work was completed in 2020, "it purrs like a kitten in a creamery now", according to a mechanic who helps maintain it.
