= Andy Anderson (rower) =

American rower and rowing coach (born 1954)

Andy Anderson (born February 19, 1954) is an American rower and rowing coach. He is a member of the National Rowing Hall of Fame and writes a column for Rowing News.

He was born in Syracuse, New York. He attended Trinity College of the United States of America. He is the author of the best selling rowing book The Compleat Dr. Rowing. He currently works at Groton School in Groton, MA, where he coaches rowing and teaches Spanish. He has led numerous boats to both New England and National high school rowing championships. In June 2011 his eight went on to win the Henley Women's Regatta, beating St. Paul's of the United States of America. He is married and has three children. Notable relatives include: Rachel Anderson, Taylor Anderson, Briannah Anderson, and Alec Anderson.
