= Daniel P. Davison =

American banker

Daniel Pomeroy Davison (January 30, 1925 – August 25, 2010) was an American banker who served from 1979 to 1990 as president of United States Trust, the oldest trust company in the United States, helping guide the company's transformation and growth through a focus on the richest of the rich, offering such personal services as walking the dogs of its top clients.

Davison was born on January 30, 1925, in Manhattan to Frederick Trubee Davison, who had served in the New York State Assembly and as Assistant United States Secretary of War, before becoming president of the American Museum of Natural History. He attended the Groton School, which had been founded in 1884 by his grandfather, Endicott Peabody. Davison enlisted during World War II in the United States Army Air Forces where he was a pilot of a Boeing B-17 Flying Fortress. He earned his undergraduate degree in 1949 from Yale University in 1949, where he was a member of the Yale Political Union and the Skull and Bones society. He earned his legal degree from Harvard Law School in 1952.

He was an associate for three years at White & Case and became the fifth generation of his family to be employed by the J. P. Morgan & Company when he was hired in 1955. He became secretary of the bank in 1957 and was involved with the legal aspects of the bank's 1959 merger with Guaranty Trust Company, becoming secretary of the merged firm. He had risen to executive vice president, and left after being passed over for a more senior position.

Davison was hired as president and chief operating officer of U.S. Trust in 1979. Davison segmented the firm's clients with those with more than $2 million in assets being called "first class", those with $300,000 to $2 million "middle class" and those with less than $300,000 termed "poor". He had the firm focus their intentions on its first class clients, a group that it called "underprivileged" in ads, offering personal service that extended to walking the dogs of its top customers. In 1982, the board commissioned an Edwina Sandys sculpture that depicts Davison walking a client's dog, as a way of demonstrating the firm's commitment to the best possible service for the super-rich. The changes he made at U.S. Trust helped the company grow from a market capitalization of $40 million when he took the helm to $2.7 billion when it was acquired by Charles Schwab in 2000 and $3.3 billion when it was taken over by Bank of America, where by the time of Davison's death it was operated as U.S. Trust, Bank of America Private Wealth Management. He left United States Trust in 1990 as chairman when he reached the mandatory retirement age of 65.

Davison died at age 85 at his family home in Locust Valley, New York on August 25, 2010, due to pancreatic cancer. He was survived by his wife, the former Katusha Cheremeteff, as well as by three sons and seven grandchildren.
