= Tiled printing =

Multiple pages used to print a large image

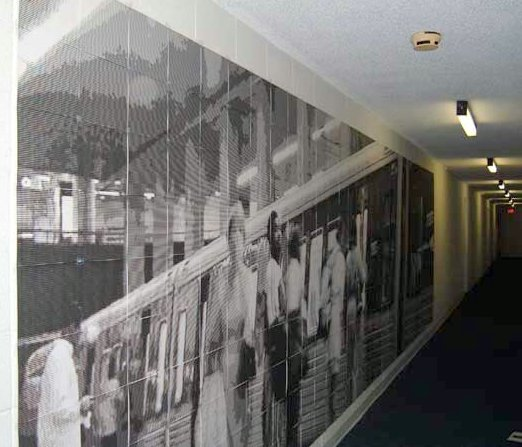
A tiled printing of a subway station hung in a hallway (source photo)

Tiled printing is a method that computer programs use to enable users to print images larger than a standard page. This method was popularized by a program called The Rasterbator. A tiled printing program overlays a grid on the printed image in which each cell (or tile) is the size of a printed page, and then prints each tile. A person can then arrange the tiles to reconstruct the full image.

Tiled printing has been widespread since the days of mainframe computers. An early example is the Unix banner program which created very large printable text banners out of ASCII characters in some Unix variants. Programs were available to convert images to ASCII art that when printed large enough and viewed sufficiently far away, appeared to be smoothly shaded. Modern software may use halftoning to achieve a similar effect.

Another form of tiled printing, inspired by continuous feed printers, involves making a long message of letters, possibly with inline graphics of the same height, and printing it sideways over several pages to make a banner. This type of printing is usually associated with The Print Shop, a 1980s software package.

Since high-resolution images are used to create the prints, a large amount of ink is used in the process. Ink jet printers are used to make tiled printouts without sacrificing the resolution of the original image at reasonable cost. These decorations are sometimes called rasterbations, after a popular tiled printing program, "The Rasterbator." The Rasterbator program accepts users images and divides them into a grid format. Users can specify how big the final product should be, in terms of pages. The application then produces PDF images that when printed out, form the entire picture.

== World records ==
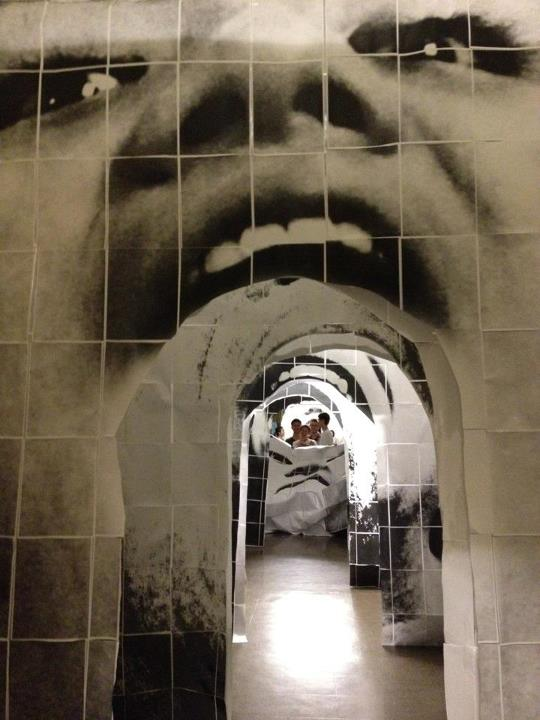
The 2012 University of Toronto Schools rasterbation

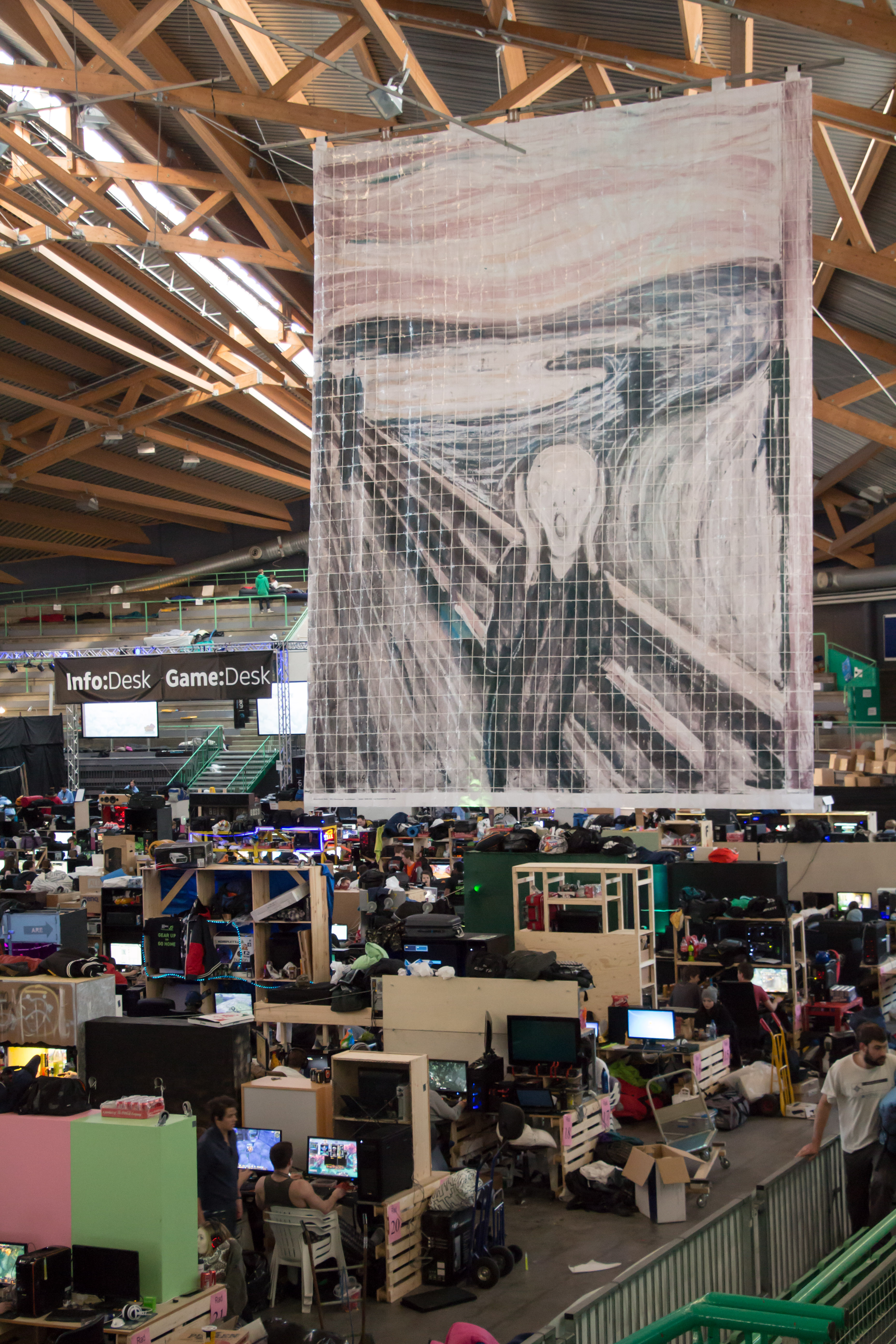
Picture of the world record rasterbation at The Gathering 2013

Rasterbation is often the subject of record-breaking attempts to create the largest and most impressive tiled prints. The title of the world's largest rasterbation was previously held by "the Doomtech crew". However, in June 2007 the graduating class of the University of Toronto Schools, a Toronto high school, produced a rasterbation incorporating 1462 sheets of 8 1/2"×14" legal-sized paper. This achievement surpassed the previous record by over two hundred sheets, but then was overtaken by a group from Groton School in May 2008. The Groton School Rasterbation used more than 1500 sheets of 11x14" paper and was 100' tall, making it the largest ever.

In June 2012, another graduating class from the University of Toronto Schools produced 74 9-by-9-foot (2.7 m × 2.7 m) rasterbations in one night, each incorporating 143 sheets of 8 1/2×11" letter-sized paper, for a record-shattering total of 10,582 sheets. Each rasterbation included the face of one of the graduating students with a doorway cut out of their gaping mouth - altogether, they created a corridor of mouths throughout the school's hallways.

In March 2013, a 1,017 square feet (94.5 m^{2}) rasterbation of Edvard Munch's iconic painting The Scream was created at Norway's largest computer party The Gathering (TG), as part of the art project "Scream from nature". It is the largest known reprint of any Munch painting. The rasterbation, made by the crew at Sørlanet, consisted of 1,517 (37 × 41) sheets of A4 paper, and measured 28.25 by 36.05 feet (8.61 m × 10.99 m).
