= Yiyang Zhuge =

Chinese philosopher

Yiyang Zhuge (Chinese: 诸葛一杨), also known as Zhong Shu (Chinese: 仲树), is a Chinese PhD candidate in political philosophy at Boston College and study-group leader for a continuing education program at Brandeis University. Zhuge runs a podcast Du Shu Bu Cheng Lin (Chinese: 独树不成林), airing episodes about political science concepts, political events, and her private life to one million subscribers. She has also been a JMC Fellow with the Jack Miller Center, and has cited Boston College professors Robert Bartlett, Robert Faulkner, and Susan Meld Shell as influences. Starting in August 2026, she has faced widespread accusations of mass plagiarism in her podcast, translators' prefaces, and online articles. Users of the Chinese social media sites Douban and Xiaohongshu also uncovered systematic discrepancies between her frequent public claims about her personal life and the facts. In August 2026, the Vistopia platform announced the removal of Zhuge's paid audio programs and book translations pending copyright investigations.

== Career ==
=== The Odyssey interview ===
In 2026, Zhuge held an interview with British and American director Christopher Nolan while on his tour promoting The Odyssey in Beijing, China. Zhuge's interview subsequently went viral for her questions about the decline of civilization. Zhuge characterized Nolan as "a bard for a civilisation at dusk," and questioned if he had ascribed Christian themes of atonement to his interpretation of a Greek tragedy.

== Plagiarism allegations ==
Zhuge has been accused of plagiarism since at least an October 2024 broadcast by fellow podcaster Flip Radio (Chinese: 翻转电台), but in August 2026 she faced widespread allegations of plagiarism and academic fraud on Chinese social media in her publications and podcast, Du Shu Bu Cheng Lin, with some "accusing her of translating and paraphrasing academic publications, open courses, and podcasts from the English-speaking world." In one episode, Zhuge "lifted almost verbatim" a 2023 New Yorker article by Agnes Callard, even attributing the original author's personal experiences to herself. Critics have also accused Zhuge of plagiarizing ideas from other scholars in her translator's preface to her translations of Hannah Arendt and Plutarch's works.

Others also pointed out that Zhuge's article "How Universities Combat AI Cheating" in Caixin Weekly substantially plagiarized an article by journalist Rose Horowitch in The Atlantic, in addition to including factual inaccuracies, leading Caixin Weekly to redact it "pending review."

Some have also questioned Zhuge's characterization of her own upbringing, pointing out that she attended the Groton School in the United States despite claiming to come from a humble, rural background.

In an interview with Chinese Communist Party newspaper Jiefang Daily republished by Sixth Tone, Zhuge firmly denied accusations of plagiarism but did not address the evidence. The editorial team at Sixth Tone verified that her Caixin Weekly article closely matched Horowitch's article in The Atlantic and cited "multiple instances where Zhuge’s scripts closely match content from overseas podcasts."
