= Sam Chauncey =

American college administrator

Henry "Sam" Chauncey, Jr. is a longtime administrator at Yale University. He has been credited in part with management of the volatile atmosphere on campus and in New Haven, Connecticut associated with the New Haven Black Panther trials.

Chauncey, a member of Yale College's class of 1957, was appointed special assistant to then Yale President Kingman Brewster, 1963–1977, in 1963. Chauncey had been a student at Groton School before Yale. Senior year he had worked in the University Secretary's office. He graduated with the Yale Class of 1957 and retired in 2000.

Chauncey is a descendant of Yale College's first graduate, and his father, Henry Chauncey, a graduate of Harvard University, was founder and head of the Educational Testing Service, and an important aide to James Bryant Conant, Harvard's president, 1933–1953, when that school expanded its admissions net. Chauncey did likewise for Brewster, with R. Inslee Clark, Jr., much as his father did for Conant in recruiting and admitting incoming classes more diverse and academically able than their predecessors.

Rather than the apocalyptic student riot that consumed Kent State University on May 4, 1970, Yale, under the leadership of Kingman Brewster on behalf of the faculty and Kurt Schmoke on behalf of the undergraduates, embraced and then managed the spirit of the protest. The protest lasted two days, May 1 and 2. Brewster and Chauncey had met with Archibald Cox of Harvard to discuss what went awry April 15, 1970 in Cambridge, Massachusetts at a protest organized by an offshoot of the white radical group Students for a Democratic Society (SDS). The consensus was locking the gates to the university incited the violence, and it had done likewise at Columbia University. Abbie Hoffman vowed that Yale would burn May 1 after the experience at Harvard.

The transition to a co-ed from all-male Yale undergraduate student body was managed by Chauncey. "I wanted straight coeducation. I thought the Vassar thing, frankly, was stupid," he remarked about the plan to bring Vassar College to New Haven as a coordinate campus to Yale, akin to Radcliffe's relation to Harvard or Pembroke College to Brown or Barnard College to Columbia. The idea was dubbed "the Vassar flirtation" in the press. The Yale Corporation voted to accept women to Yale College on a full coeducational basis beginning in the fall of 1969.

Sam Chauncey also served as founder of the Yale Health Management Program at the Yale School of Public Health, a division of the Yale School of Medicine. Chauncey created the first health management program of its kind at Yale, and some argue the first of its kind at any major university. Students took classes with MBA and MPH students, sharing in the experiences of both school seamlessly, with working internships in relevant fields.

Chauncey founded a non-profit organization, Science Park Development Corporation, which undertook the renovation of an abandoned industrial site in the black neighborhood, Newhallville where about 9,000 people had been put out of work.
