= Celene Ibrahim =

Islamic scholar

Academic background
- Education: Princeton University (B.A.); Harvard University (M.D.); Brandeis University (M.A., PhD)

Academic work
- Discipline: Islamic studies

Celene Ibrahim is an American Islamic scholar. She is currently serving as a faculty member in the Department of Religious Studies and Philosophy at Groton School.

== Biography ==
Ibrahim graduated from Princeton University with a BA in Near Eastern Studies, and was the first person to receive a Master of Divinity from Harvard University with a concentration in Islamic studies and Muslim leadership. She received her PhD for her work on Arabic and Islamic Civilizations, as well as a Master of Arts in Women and Gender Studies and Near Eastern and Judaic Studies from Brandeis University. She worked as a chaplain at Tufts University and was a scholar-in-residence in Islamic studies on the faculties of Andover Newton Theological School and Hebrew College.

== Works ==
As author

- Islam and Monotheism
- Women and Gender in the Qur'an

As editor

- One Nation, Indivisible: Seeking Liberty and Justice from the Pulpit to the Streets

As contributor

- Testament: The Story of Moses.
