= Henry Chauncey =

American educational administrator (1905-2002)

Henry Chauncey (February 9, 1905 – December 3, 2002) was a founder and the first president of the Educational Testing Service (ETS). As a Harvard University administrator, he helped popularize the use of the Scholastic Aptitude Test in college admissions.

== Early life and education ==
Chauncey was born in Brooklyn, New York to the Reverend Egisto Fabbri Chauncey and Edith Lockwood Taft Chauncey. Although Chauncey's father was an Episcopalian, he came from a long Puritan lineage; his ancestors on his father's side included Charles Chauncy, president of Harvard College from 1654 to 1671. The Chaunceys originally descended from Norman nobility that participated in William the Conqueror's 1066 conquest of England.

In 1913, the Chaunceys moved to Columbus, Ohio when Egisto became the rector of Trinity Episcopal Church. By this time the family had lost much of its old wealth.

Chauncey returned to the East Coast when he won a scholarship to Groton School, his father's old boarding school. Groton had recently begun offering scholarships by competitive examination, but its exams bore little resemblance to modern standardized tests. Sample questions from the 1921 exam included "Name month and year when United States broke diplomatic relations with Germany", "Name three animals that hibernate", and "How is vinegar made?"

Since his parents could not afford to send him to Harvard, Chauncey returned to Columbus after high school and spent his freshman year at Ohio State University, where he studied psychology under Herbert Toops, an early proponent of standardized testing. He transferred to Harvard after Groton's headmaster arranged for Wall Street financier Clarence Dillon to subsidize his Harvard tuition. An excellent athlete, Chauncey lettered in football and baseball at Harvard (he declined an offer to turn professional with the Boston Braves) and was elected class president. He graduated from Harvard in 1928.

== Career ==
=== Background ===
Chauncey's year at Ohio State proved formative for his career, as that year, Professor Toops convinced the university to allow him to administer a "psychological examination" to the incoming freshmen. Toops hoped that the exam would be predictive of freshman grades, which (at least for Chauncey) it was. For Chauncey, this ignited a lifelong interest in "the application of objective tests to college admission." After transferring to Harvard, Chauncey continued studying the emerging science of testing under Philip Rulon. He was particularly fascinated by a Carnegie Foundation study that found that standardized testing was only weakly correlated with a student's real-life level of education, suggesting that "students' educational achievement could be scientifically measured across a long range of schools."

After graduating from college, Chauncey taught at Penn Charter School for a year. Harvard president A. Lawrence Lowell then gave him a job as the assistant faculty dean and head of the scholarship committee. Lowell strongly opposed any strict reliance on objective criteria in college admissions. Although he had reformed Harvard's entrance examination process to encourage public school students to apply, he soon realized that his reforms had drastically increased the number of Jewish students at Harvard and began looking for ways to limit Jewish enrollment (see Jewish quota). He implemented subjective policies such as applicant interviews, teacher recommendations, and character references, which gave Harvard's admissions office discretion to choose well-born gentile students over academically superior Jewish students.

=== Introduction of the SAT ===
Lowell died in 1933 and was succeeded by James Bryant Conant, who was more interested than Lowell in improving the academic quality of the undergraduate student body. Conant provided Chauncey with a financial aid budget and encouraged him to "figure out a way to select the scholarship students." This was an initially daunting task, since Harvard traditionally drew most of its students from a select group of feeder schools with whom Harvard had a close relationship. He was unsure how to evaluate report cards from schools across the country, which might have tougher or more relaxed standards than the traditional feeder schools.

After evaluating several proposals, Chauncey selected Carl Brigham's Scholastic Aptitude Test, which had been introduced on an experimental basis in 1926 but had not gained significant traction with college admissions offices. By 1936 Harvard required all scholarship applicants to take the SAT, and by 1937 other colleges, including Yale, Princeton, and Columbia, agreed to accept the SAT. Even so, the SAT was not a national exam. Before World War II, the SAT was never administered to more than 18,000 people in a single year.

Chauncey broadened his testing efforts during World War II, when the military used standardized tests to grant intellectually promising students draft deferments so that they could spend some time in college and then enter the military at higher grades. Conant released Chauncey to the Pentagon to help the war effort. In April 1943, Chauncey successfully administered a standardized test to 325,000 young men.

=== Expansion of the SAT ===
After the war, Chauncey left Harvard to join the College Entrance Examination Board. He then established the Educational Testing Service in 1947, with funding from Devereux Josephs of the Carnegie Corporation. He led the organization until his retirement in 1970.

Before the war, the adoption of the SAT had not significantly altered the composition of Harvard's student body. Financial aid was limited (as Chauncey's own experience as a Harvard undergraduate illustrated), and even top universities "were for the most part willing to accept any boys who could pass the [entrance examinations of the period] and whose fathers could pay the tuition." In 1940, Harvard accepted 76 out of 77 applicants from the St. Grottlesex schools.

During Chauncey's years at ETS, the SAT evolved from an Ivy League scholarship examination into a national allocator of student talent. The postwar government expanded the pool of students who could afford college by backing student loans (Higher Education Act of 1965) and providing G.I. Bill funding for veterans. As such, many more college admissions offices were facing the same problem that Chauncey had faced at Harvard: how to evaluate students from around the country. University admissions became significantly more competitive, pressuring out many students from the Ivy League's traditional feeder schools: a 1969 study of 14 private feeder high schools found that while 52% of their alumni matriculated to Harvard, Yale, and Princeton in 1953, the figure had more than halved to 25% by 1967. Educational historian Nicholas Lemann wrote that Chauncey "work[ed] ceaselessly to replace the elite he grew up in with a new elite that he probably wouldn't have been in."

Chauncey was not inflexible about the use of standardized testing. At ETS, Chauncey periodically considered supplementing the SAT with a wider battery of personality and psychological tests, which were not implemented. In addition, according to Chauncey's son Sam (who later became an admissions officer at Yale), Chauncey acknowledged that the SAT did not perfectly gauge intellectual promise since students from more privileged socioeconomic backgrounds tended to perform better on the test. Chauncey also felt that in contrast to the 1930s and 1940s, improving data about individual high schools across the country made it easier for admissions offices to evaluate report cards from a diverse range of secondary schools without recourse to a standardized test.
