= Temba Maqubela =

South African educator and administrator (born 1958)

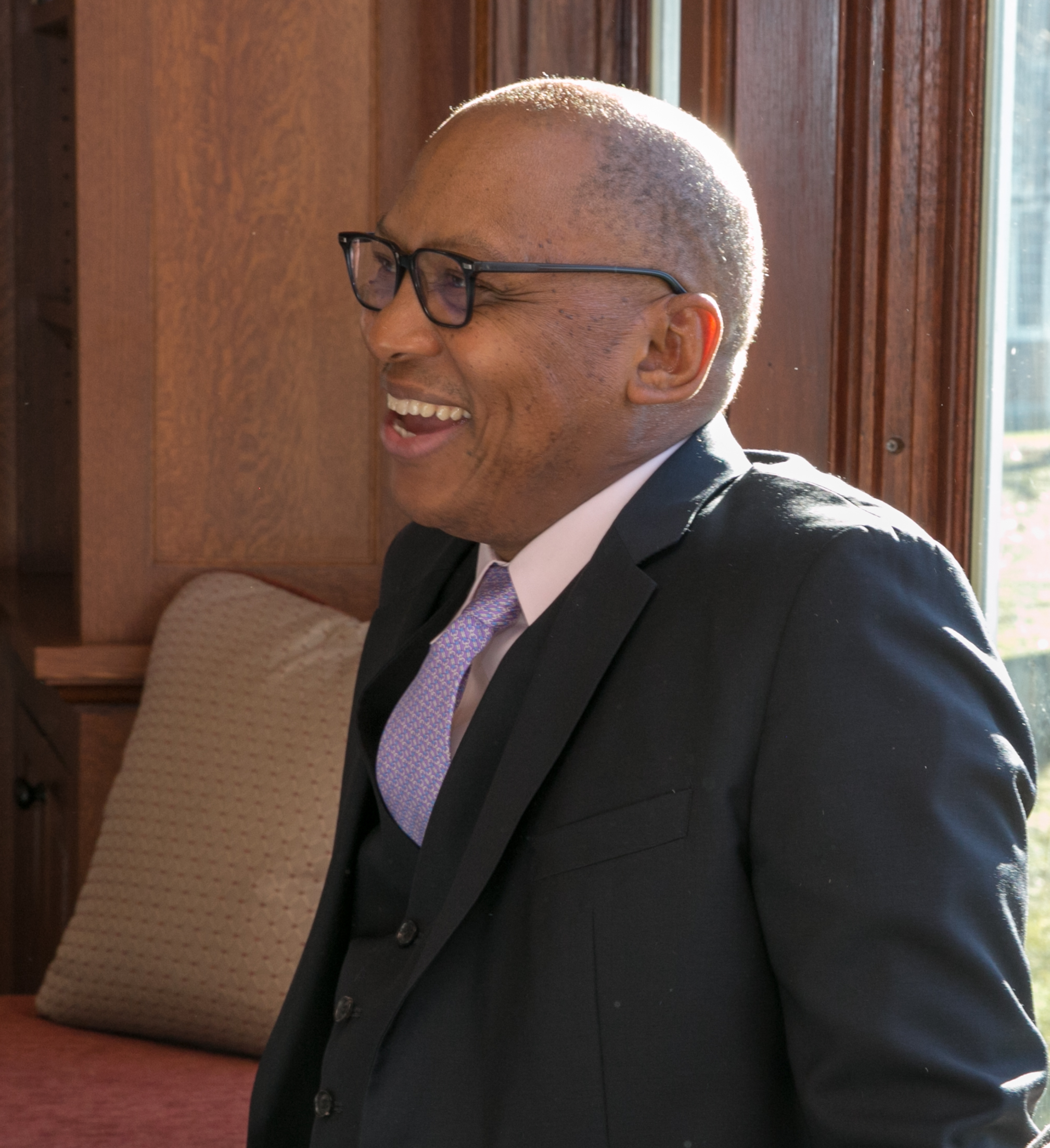
- Born: 1958 (age 67–68); King William's Town, South Africa
- Education: University of Ibadan; University of Kentucky (MS)
- Occupation: Headmaster
- Organization: Groton School
- Spouse: Vuyelwa
- Children: 3

Temba Maqubela (born 1958) is a South African educator and administrator. He is the eighth and current headmaster of Groton School, the American boarding school, serving since 2013. Before Groton, he spent 26 years at Phillips Academy (Andover), eventually rising to faculty dean and assistant head of school for academics.

== Early life and education ==
Maqubela was born in 1958 to Jiyana Maqubela, an accountant, and Shena Matthews, a biology teacher. The family were Anglicans. Maqubela grew up in the mining village of Nonkobe, South Africa.

Maqubela is a fourth-generation educator: through his maternal grandmother, his great-grandfather was John Knox Bokwe, the South African composer and educator. Maqubela's maternal grandfather was Z. K. Matthews, the first Botswanan ambassador to the United States and the first black graduate of a South African university. His first cousin is Naledi Pandor, the South African Minister of Home Affairs.

Maqubela attended St. John's College, Mtatha, a South African boarding school where his mother was a teacher. He obtained a scholarship to medical school, but in 1976, he was forced to leave school at the age of 17 after the police arrested him for anti-apartheid activities. He took advantage of the chaos caused by the Soweto Uprising to escape to Botswana, where he obtained political asylum, and then moved to Nigeria for university. Because of his exile, he never obtained a high school diploma.

Maqubela obtained a bachelor's of science in chemistry from the University of Ibadan in Nigeria. During his years at Andover, he also obtained a master's degree in chemistry from the University of Kentucky, graduating in 1994.

== Educational career ==
=== Early career ===
After obtaining his bachelor's degree, Maqubela taught at the Maru-a-Pula School in Gaborone, Botswana from 1984 to 1986. However, the South African government monitored the activities of black exiles. During the 1985 Raid on Gaborone, Maqubela and his family narrowly escaped being killed when the South African military assaulted the wrong house. The South African government continued to surveil him following the raid.

To avoid further persecution, the Maqubela family moved to New York City, again obtaining political asylum. To make ends meet, Maqubela briefly worked as a coat checker at the American Museum of Natural History and moved his family into a homeless shelter. He eventually obtained a job at Long Island City High School, a public school in Queens, where he spent one year before moving to Andover.

=== Andover ===
In 1987, Maqubela moved to Massachusetts to become a chemistry teacher at Phillips Academy (Andover), a private boarding school. He left for two years to study for his master's degree. After returning to Andover, he chaired the chemistry department from 1994 to 1999. He was promoted to faculty dean in 2004 and assistant head of school for academics in 2006.

At Andover, Maqubela participated in several programs to improve educational readiness for traditionally underrepresented populations. He directed MS(2), the academy's math and science-focused summer school program for minority students, and started the ACE Scholars Program to "tackle[] the preparation gap among gifted students." He also participated in Andover's global education programs.

Maqubela was awarded the White House Distinguished Teacher Award in 1993, and was inducted into the Hall of Fame for the Northeast Section of the American Chemical Society in 2002.

=== Groton ===
In 2012, Maqubela was appointed the eighth headmaster of Groton School, starting in the 2013–14 academic year. From 2014 to 2024, he raised $95 million to support the school's financial aid initiatives. In November of 2026, he announced that he will retire at the end of June, 2028.

== Other ==
Maqubela serves on the board of South Africa Partners. He is a co-founder and board director of Masibumbane Development Organisation, an NGO established in 2010 to serve the populations of the Eastern Cape of South Africa. He also serves on the advisory council of the African Leadership Academy, a pan-African secondary institution.

== Personal life ==
Maqubela has been married to educator Vuyelwa Maqubela, the daughter of Hill of Fools author R.L. Peteni, since 1985. They have three children. His wife taught English at Andover, and subsequently Groton.
