= Liane Malcos =

American rower

Liane Malcos (born March 25, 1978) is an American rower. In the 2003 World Rowing Championships, she won a gold medal in the women's coxless four event.

== International competitions ==
Year	Competition	Venue	Event	Medal
2003	World Rowing Championships	Milan, Italy	Women's coxless four	2nd place, silver medalist(s)
