= Perdio Radio =

British electronics company

Perdio Radio logo

Perdio Radio was a British electronics company (Perdio Electronics Limited) founded by Derek Willmott (born 4 January 1924) and Joyce Willmott in 1955. Former RAF pilot Derek Willmott was a DECCA researcher developing RADAR applications and was already an inventor, with designs for multiple miniaturisation applications in consumer electronics, including designs for portable personal tape players (similar to the later success of Sony's Walkman) and small radios and televisions. The newly available transistors allowed the Willmotts to enter the market with Perdio, producing the PR1 in 1957. A 5 Transistor design meant a highly compact and efficient unit which led on to production of 56 models bearing the Perdio name. Perdio also produced the Portarama Television set currently on display in Londons Science Museum along with a 'Spinney' radio.

In 1962, the name changed to Perdio Electronics Ltd, Bonhill Street, London, EC2 (when Perdio became a public company) and opened a factory on Pallion Trading Estate in Sunderland.

Perdio went into receivership in 1965. By 1965, Perdio also owned: Kenure-Holt Electronics and Electric Audio Reproducers ("EAR") Ltd.
