= Groton School =

Private school in Massachusetts, U.S.

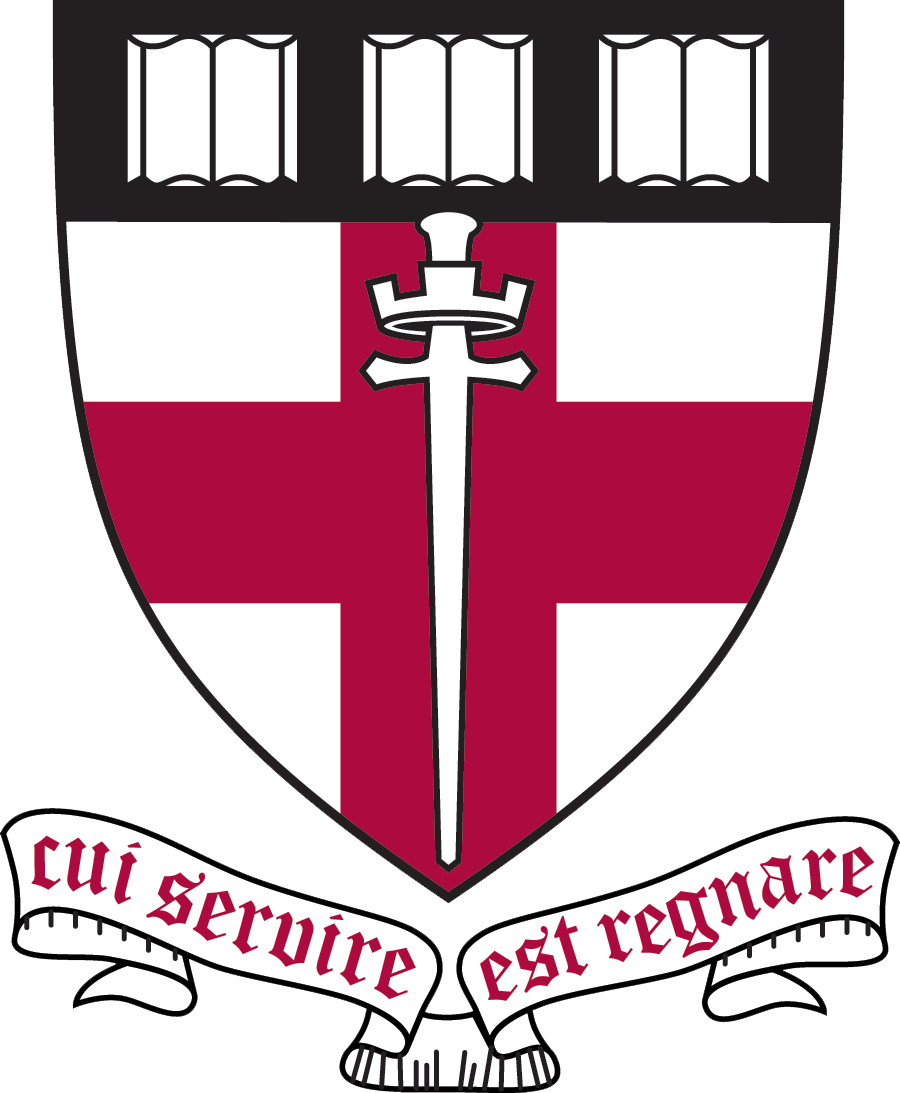

Location
- 282 Farmers Row; Groton, Massachusetts 01450; United States; 42°35′36″N 71°35′03″W

Information
- Type: Private; Independent; day; boarding; college-preparatory school
- Motto: Cui servire est regnare ("In whose [God's] service is perfect freedom" / "To serve [God] is to reign")
- Religious affiliation: Episcopal Church
- Established: October 15, 1884; 142 years ago
- Founder: Endicott Peabody
- Headmaster: Temba Maqubela
- Grades: 8–12
- Gender: Coeducational
- Enrollment: 378 (2023–24)
- Campus type: rural
- Colors: Red, white & black
- Athletics conference: Independent School League
- Nickname: Zebras
- Accreditation: NEASC
- Endowment: $475 million
- Tuition: Boarding: $62,740; Day: $48,850
- Website: groton.org

Groton School is a private, college-preparatory, day and boarding school located in Groton, Massachusetts, United States. It is affiliated with the Episcopal tradition.

Groton enrolls about 380 boys and girls from the eighth through twelfth grades, dubbed Forms II–VI in the British fashion. Its $475 million endowment enables the school to admit students on a need-blind basis. Typically, 40–44% of students are on financial aid. Students with family incomes under $150,000 attend for free.

The school's list of notable alumni includes U.S. President Franklin D. Roosevelt and Nobel laureate John B. Goodenough.

== History ==
=== The Peabody era, 1884–1940 ===
Groton School was founded in 1884 by Endicott Peabody, an Episcopal priest. Peabody was backed by Harvard president Charles Eliot and affluent figures of the time, such as Peabody's father Samuel Peabody, Phillips Brooks, William Lawrence, William Crowninshield Endicott, and J. P. Morgan. The school also enjoyed the patronage of the Roosevelt family, as Theodore Roosevelt was one of Peabody's close friends. Groton's founding was part of a larger nineteenth-century effort to establish more Episcopal prep schools in the United States. Motivated by the Oxford Movement, founders of Saint James in Maryland, St. Paul's in New Hampshire, and St. Mark's in Southborough sought to emulate English-style schools in the Anglo-Catholic tradition.

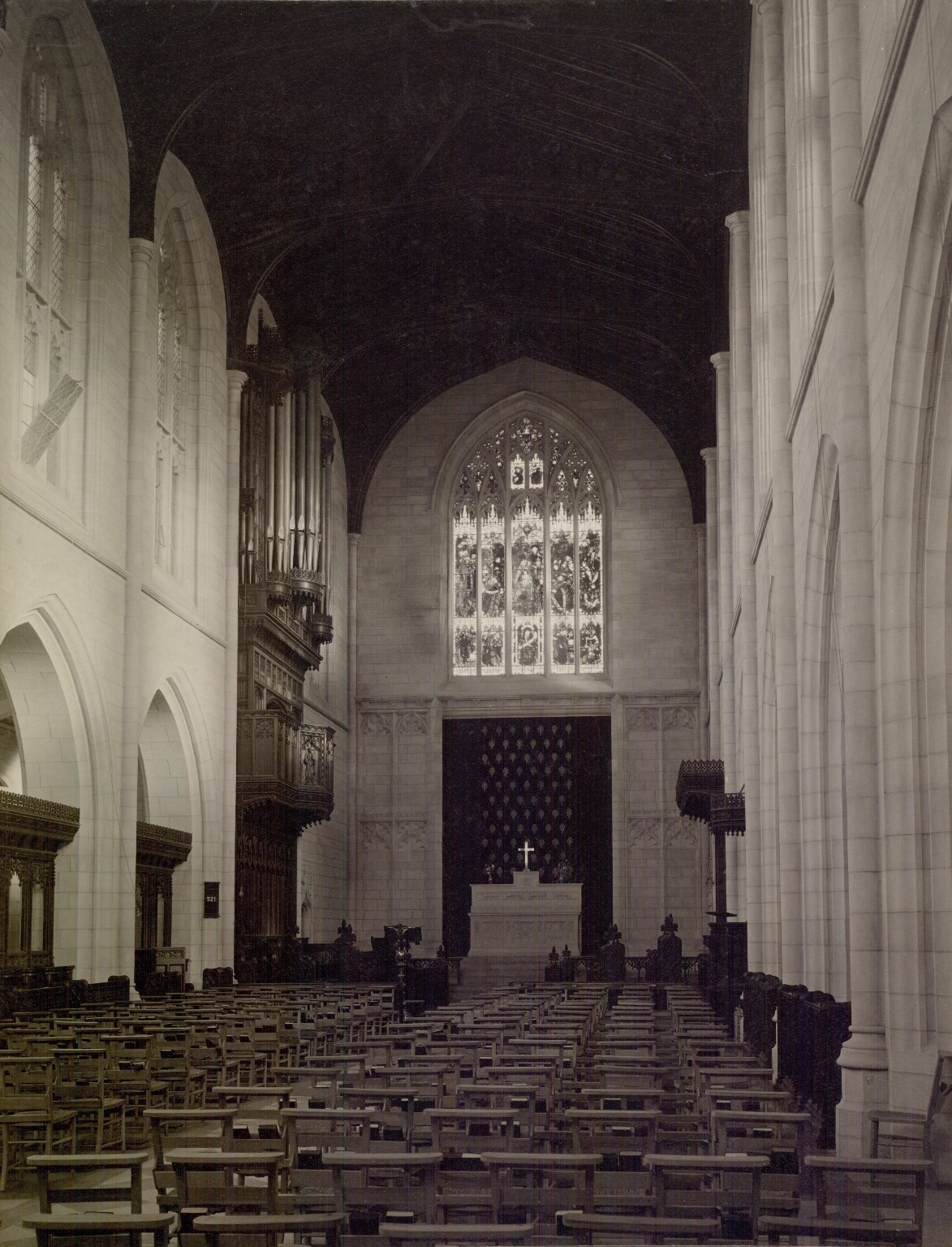
The design of St. John's Chapel (1900) reflects the school's Anglican tradition. Its architect, a high churchman, proposed adding an ornate reredos like the one he built for St. Paul's School, but Endicott Peabody vetoed it.

Peabody served as headmaster for 56 years. A proponent of "muscular Christianity," he instituted a Spartan educational system that included cold showers and dormitory cubicles instead of individual bedrooms. He successfully attracted the children of wealthy families, whom he hoped to toughen up through this program of "corrective salutary deprivation."

Under Peabody, Groton sought to inspire its students to serve the public good, rather than enter professional life. In peacetime, many graduates were involved in public affairs, but the alumni typically gravitated to business, finance, law, or similar professional positions. In wartime, the school's ethos of public service played a more prominent role. Of Groton's 580 military-age alumni, 475 served in World War I; 24 died and another 36 were wounded, at a time when the graduating class contained roughly 27 students. Roughly 700 alumni served in World War II, with 31 deaths.

Peabody also expected his students to "be ready for advanced courses at the universities." He sought to improve the academic qualities of the student body, introducing competitive entrance examinations and a scholarship program in 1907. (One such scholarship student, Henry Chauncey '23, went on to popularize the Scholastic Aptitude Test with American universities.) Since even Ivy League universities could not always be counted on for financial aid at the time, Peabody also helped certain students pay for college. Chauncey was able to transfer from Ohio State to Harvard after Peabody arranged for a Groton donor to subsidize the cost, and Peabody gave the 1940 valedictorian and future Nobel laureate John B. Goodenough a tutoring job to help make ends meet after the latter was admitted to Yale.

=== The Crocker era, 1940–65 ===
Peabody was succeeded by John Crocker '18, the Episcopal chaplain at Princeton University. Crocker's 25-year tenure overlapped with the dawn of the Civil Rights Movement. In 1952, Groton accepted its first African-American student. In April 1965, Crocker and his wife—accompanied by 85 Groton students—marched with Martin Luther King Jr. during a civil rights demonstration in Boston. (Four years earlier, Southern authorities had arrested Crocker's son John Jr. '42 during the Freedom Rides, leading to the Supreme Court case Pierson v. Ray.) Crocker also significantly expanded the school's financial aid program; by his retirement in 1965 approximately 30% of Groton students were on scholarship.

=== Co-education and change, 1965–77 ===
After Crocker, Groton cycled through three brief Headmasterships: Bertrand Honea Jr. (1965–69), Paul Wright (1969–74), and Rowland Cox (1974–77). These years were marked by disputes over how (if at all) to implement co-education at Groton. Honea proposed either merging with a girls' school or formalizing a sister-school relationship with Concord Academy, a well-regarded girls' school twenty miles away. (Concord declined Groton's offer to help relocate the academy to the town of Groton, and mooted the issue by opening its doors to boys in 1971.) Following Honea's departure, Wright successfully proposed an organic transition to co-education by expanding the student body from 225 to 300 students; this plan limited the number of boys that would be rejected under the new system. After Wright reached Groton's mandatory retirement age, the school tapped Cox to implement the plan. Groton welcomed its first female students in 1975. Applications tripled, and today, Groton's student body is evenly split between boys and girls.

The new headmasters also relaxed some of the more Spartan aspects of Peabody's Groton in response to changing preferences within the American upper class, which increasingly favored private day schools over boarding schools. They replaced the sleeping cubicles with proper bedrooms, added more holidays to the academic calendar, relaxed the dress code, authorized a school newspaper, and gave students more free time over the weekends to explore the town of Groton or their own personal interests. However, some traditions remain, such as the school's commitment to public service, its small community, and its attachment to the Episcopal Church.

=== Contemporary Groton, 1977–present ===
Groton reached its modern form under William Polk '58 (1978–2003) and Richard Commons (2003–13), who significantly upgraded the campus' buildings and grounds and internationalized the admissions process; and the current Headmaster, the South African Temba Maqubela (2013–present). In recent years the school has focused on broadening affordability. In 2008, Groton, Andover, and Exeter began offering free tuition to families with household incomes below a certain threshold, initially set at $75,000. From 2014 to 2018, the school conducted a $74 million fundraising campaign that allowed it to begin admitting students on a need-blind basis. In November of 2026 it was announced that Maqubela will retire in June, 2028.

In the spring of 1999, the Middlesex County District Attorney began investigating the claims of three Groton seniors, who alleged that they, and other students, had been sexually abused by other students in dormitories in 1996 and 1997. During the school's investigation of the matter, another student brought a similar complaint to the school's attention. In 2005, the school pleaded guilty to a criminal misdemeanor charge of failing to report the latter student's sexual abuse complaint to the government and paid a $1,250 fine. The school issued an apology to the victims, and the civil suit stemming from the first student's complaint was settled out of court. In the fall of 2006, as part of the settlement, the school published a full apology to the boy who first alleged the abuse in 1999.

Members of the Groton community continue to play a notable role in the secondary school community. At present, former Groton masters are the heads of school at Cranbrook (Aimeclaire Roche, also president of the national Heads and Principals Association), St. Paul's (Kathleen Giles), Roxbury Latin (Sam Schaffer), Dana Hall (Katherine Bradley), Salisbury (William Webb), and Brewster International (Craig Gemmell), among others.

== Academics and reputation ==
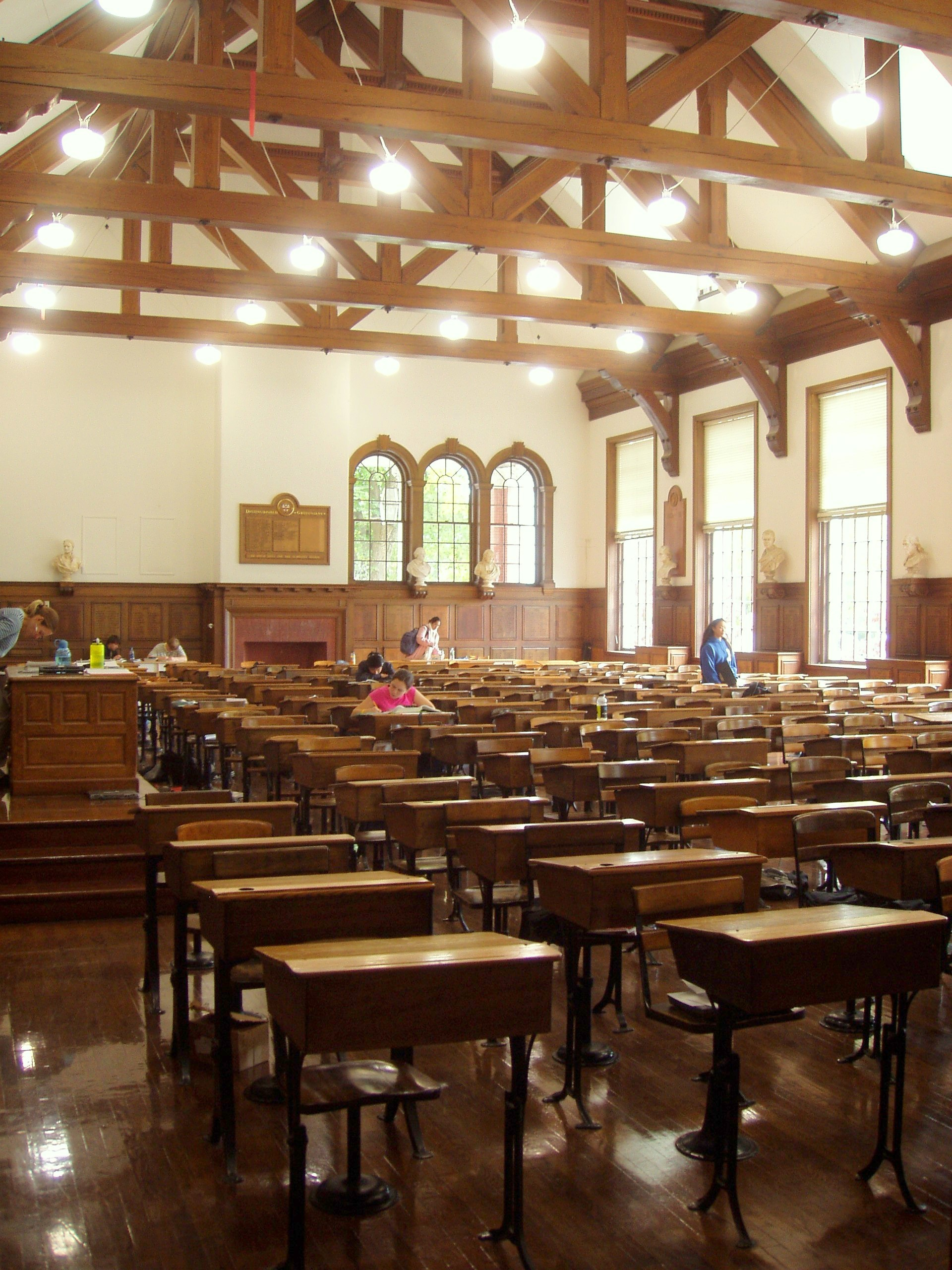
The walls of the Schoolroom (the study hall) are covered with wooden tablets bearing the names of every graduate and every member of Phi Beta Kappa.

In 2024, Niche ranked Groton as America's top private high school. In 2016, Business Insider ranked Groton as the most selective boarding school in the United States. In 2024, the website Private School Review repeated this ranking, although it did not say whether it confirmed this information with Groton.

=== Curriculum and test scores ===
The Form of 2023's average combined SAT score was 1490 and its average combined ACT score was 33.5. The school's 4:1 student-teacher ratio allows the school to offer a variety of courses and an individualized study program for seniors whose academic interests have gone beyond the regular curriculum. Although not every academic department offers Advanced Placement classes, Groton students took 2,582 AP exams (approximately 6.5 per student) from 2018 to 2022 and passed 93% of them.

=== Role as feeder school ===
Groton has historically served as a feeder school for Harvard College. From 1906 to 1932, 405 Groton students applied to Harvard and 402 were accepted.

There were at least three major reasons for this level of success. First, even Ivy League schools accepted most of their applicants until the second half of the twentieth century, when the government expanded the pool of students who could afford college by backing student loans (Higher Education Act of 1965) and providing G.I. Bill funding for veterans. (Stanford, which accepted seven of every eight applicants in 1951, was rejecting four of every five by 1965.) Second, Groton students often performed well on college entrance examinations. From 1906 to 1934, only six students received perfect scores on the English component of the College Boards (the predecessor to the SAT), and four were Groton alumni. Third, even when Groton produced middling students, elite colleges were often willing to admit them anyway because of their parents' legacy status, wealth, or connections. One especially rich Groton boy did so poorly in school that Endicott Peabody threatened to ban him from applying to Harvard. Despite "appalling" scores on his entrance exams, Harvard admitted him anyway. (In those days, a student did not actually have to pass his entrance exams to be admitted.)

In 1953, McGeorge Bundy '36 became the faculty dean at Harvard, a role which gave him oversight of undergraduate admissions. Although he became a Groton trustee in 1957, he believed that the college entrance exams of the time were doing a poor job of identifying the most talented students, and concluded that "[t]he untrained boy of real brilliance is more valuable to [Harvard] than the dull boy who has been intensely trained." In 1958, Bundy commissioned a report urging Harvard to diversify its student body and to give greater weight to raw academic talent in undergraduate admissions. The share of prep school graduates at Harvard declined from 57% of the freshman class in 1941 to 32% in 1980. These changes were not confined to Harvard. In 1960, Groton's 75th anniversary book accurately warned that prep school students were now "challenged ... by boys who come from public schools all over the country. As one [Yale] dean said to me, 'There has been a dramatic rise in the academic competence of Yale's students during the last few years. The best of the present are no better than the best of previous years; there are simply more of them.'"

From 2019 to 2023, the ten most common destinations for Groton graduates (in order) were University of Chicago, Georgetown University, Yale University, Harvard University, Boston College, Stanford University, University of Pennsylvania, Princeton University, Brown University, and Columbia University.

From 2023 to 2025, the twelve most common destinations for Groton graduates (in order) were University of Chicago, Harvard University, Tufts University, Dartmouth College, Stanford University, Brown University, Georgetown University, Boston College, Yale University, Vanderbilt University, University of Pennsylvania, and Princeton University.

From 2022 to 2026, the fifteen most common destinations for Groton graduates (in order) were University of Chicago, Harvard University, Tufts University, Boston College, Dartmouth College, Yale University, Georgetown University, Cornell University, Princeton University, Stanford University, Brown University, Columbia University, Middlebury College, University of Pennsylvania, and Northwestern University.

=== Related educational institutions ===
Groton has contributed to several other educational institutions.

In 1909, Bishop Charles Henry Brent founded Baguio School (now Brent International School Baguio) in Baguio, Philippines to educate the children of American colonial administrators, military personnel, missionaries, and businesspeople. The school's first headmaster was Remsen B. Ogilby, a former Groton teacher, and Peabody lent the school Guy Ayrault, who became its first assistant headmaster. Peabody's son Malcolm '07 ran the school from 1911 to 1913. The school sought to be a "determinedly American institution" in Southeast Asia until the Philippines gained their independence in 1946.

In 1926, Peabody founded Brooks School in North Andover, Massachusetts. Groton was heavily oversubscribed, and the introduction of competitive examinations in 1907 had not meaningfully trimmed the waitlist. Peabody did not want to increase the size of the school (which never exceeded 194 students during his tenure), but also did not want to turn away too many parents. Accordingly, he raised over $200,000 from Groton donors to build a new school, which, like Groton, would be Episcopal and small enough to be familial. Brooks sought to replicate Groton's emphasis on "stern Christian principles ... to train boys for life," but avoided the "character-building cold showers that had been a dreaded prebreakfast ritual at Groton."

Groton currently supports Epiphany School, an academically intensive, tuition-free, lottery-admission Episcopal middle school for at-risk youth in the Boston area. The Epiphany School was founded by John Finley '88, and Groton headmaster William Polk previously served on Epiphany's board. Epiphany's academic year is 11 months long, and the entire school relocates to Groton's campus in the summer.

== Admissions and student body ==
=== Admission policies ===
After several years of acceptance rates around 12%, applications increased by 20% during the COVID-19 pandemic, driving the acceptance rate down to 9% in 2021 and 8% in 2022.

Groton admits students on a need-blind basis. Before adopting need-blind admissions, full-pay applicants had an advantage in the application process; in 2012, the last year the school reported these statistics, 25–30% of full-pay applicants were admitted compared to 10–20% of financial aid applicants. In 2018, the school announced that its admission rate was the same for both financial aid applicants and full-pay applicants.

At the start of the 2018–19 school year, 18 of Groton's 96 incoming students were siblings of current students, and another five were children of school employees.

=== Grade levels ===
At Groton, grades are known as forms, a term used in the United Kingdom and adopted by Endicott Peabody from his time at Cheltenham College. In 1967, the last class of seventh graders (in school jargon, "first formers") was admitted. In the 2022–23 school year, Groton enrolled 26 eighth graders ("second formers"), 81 freshmen ("third formers"), 87 sophomores ("fourth formers"), 92 juniors ("fifth formers"), and 91 seniors ("sixth formers"), for a total enrollment of 377 students.

=== Student body ===
Student body composition (2021–22)
Race and ethnicity	Groton	Massachusetts
White	47.5%	69.6%
Asian	23.5%	7.7%
Black	8.7%	9.5%
Hispanic	12.9%	13.1%
Multiracial	7.4%	2.7%

When Groton was founded in 1884, American boarding schools primarily catered to White Anglo-Saxon Protestants. St. Paul's accepted only students with "sound Episcopal credentials," and in 1885 Andover admitted a Jew "[f]or the first time in twelve years." Although Groton was open to Jews and non-Episcopalian Christians (for example, the Presbyterian Theodore Roosevelt and the Jewish Otto Kahn both sent their sons to Groton), the results were not substantially different.

In Groton's early years, most of its students came from wealthy families in New York; some others came from New England. A 1902 graduate recognized that "[n]inety-five percent of these boys came from what they considered the aristocracy of America. Their fathers belonged to the Somerset, the Knickerbocker, the Philadelphia or the Baltimore Clubs. Among them was a goodly slice of the wealth of the nation." Accordingly, schools such as Groton considered it their mission "to make virtuous and brave those who, through the accident of birth, would someday exercise great power and influence."

In the 2023–24 school year, 46% of Groton students identified as students of color, and 15% commuted to school from towns and cities in Massachusetts and New Hampshire. In addition, 7% of the student body were foreign students; they came from 25 countries.

== Finances ==
=== Tuition and financial aid ===
In the 2023–24 school year, Groton charged boarding students $59,995 and day students $46,720, plus other optional and mandatory fees. Typically, 40–44% of students are on financial aid, which covers, on average, $46,519 for boarding students and $32,371 for day students. Since 2008, Groton has guaranteed free tuition for families with incomes under a certain threshold. In 2024, the school raised the threshold from $80,000 to $150,000. All financial aid is distributed as grants (i.e., nothing needs to be paid back); the school discontinued student loans in 2007.

In 2014, Groton adopted a policy of restricting frontline tuition below that of its competitors. In 2022, it was the least expensive school among a sample of 40 peer boarding schools. However, after financial aid is taken into consideration, other boarding schools may still offer competitive tuition packages once a student is admitted. For example, at Lawrenceville, boarding tuition for 2023–24 was $76,080 (roughly $16,000 more than Groton), but the average aid grant for boarding students that year was around $60,000 (roughly $13,000 more than Groton). Conversely, at Roxbury Latin, an all-boys day school with a similar frontline tuition policy, tuition for 2024–25 was $40,600 ($6,820 less than Groton) while the average aid grant was $27,348 ($8,811 less than Groton).

=== Endowment and expenses ===
Groton's financial endowment stands at $475 million. In its Internal Revenue Service filings for the 2021–22 school year, Groton reported total assets of $623.4 million, net assets of $537.3 million, investment holdings of $471.1 million, and cash holdings of $3.1 million. Groton also reported $37.8 million in program service expenses and $7.8 million in grants (primarily student financial aid).

== Governance ==
=== Organization ===
Groton is an independent (private) school accredited by the New England Association of Schools and Colleges. The school was initially organized as a charitable trust. In 1893, the Massachusetts legislature passed an act reorganizing the school into a non-profit corporation governed by a board of trustees. The Articles of Incorporation have been amended only twice since 1893: to enable girls to attend Groton, and to change the name of the legal entity from Trustees of Groton School to (simply) Groton School.

=== External affiliations ===
Groton does not participate in either the Eight Schools Association or the Ten Schools Admissions Organization. Outside of athletics, Groton has collaborated with other independent schools on a primarily ad hoc basis. For example, after the Kent State shootings, Groton, St. Paul's, Andover, and Exeter held an emergency meeting to discuss how boarding schools should respond to growing student unrest. Groton also worked with St. Paul's, Andover, Deerfield, and Hotchkiss to create the Gateway to Prep Schools application portal. The current headmaster, Temba Maqubela, sits on the board of the Heads and Principals Association.

=== Funding ===
As an independent school, Groton is not dependent on public funding. However, private schools are still eligible for government grants and indirect assistance. The Massachusetts Development Finance Agency has issued tax-exempt bonds to finance renovations and/or new buildings at Groton, Andover, Deerfield, St. Mark's, and Nobles. The schools are still required to pay back the bonds on their own, but obtain tax benefits and more attractive repayment terms by working with the government.

== Campus ==
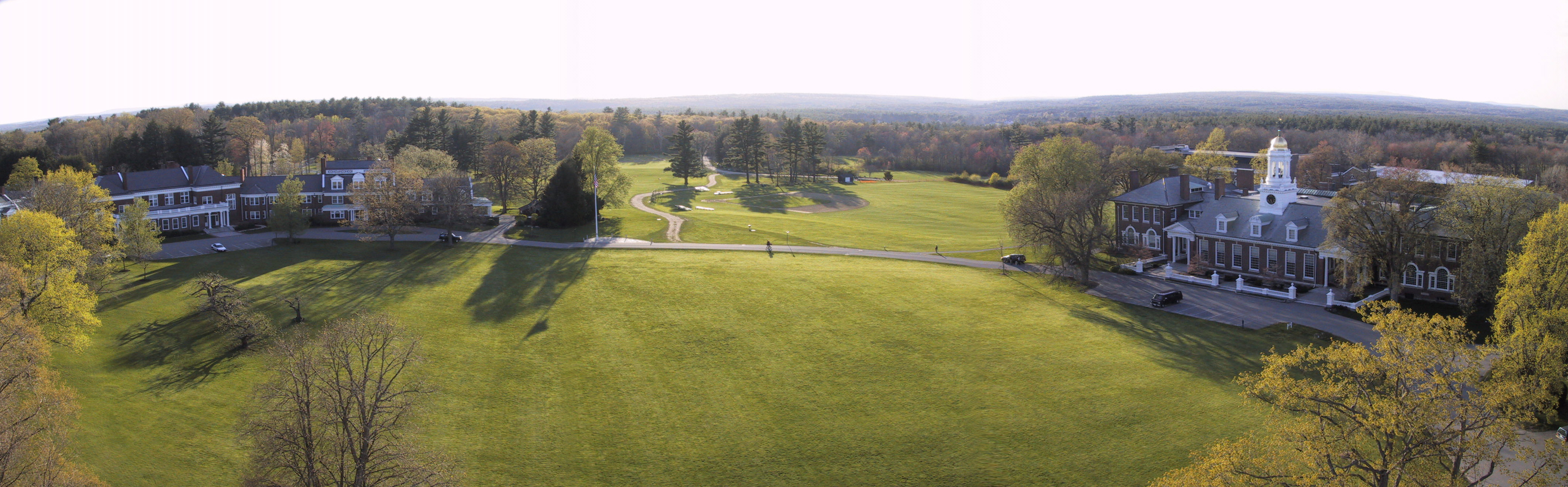
Groton School, as viewed from the top of St. John's Chapel. Hundred House is on the left and the Schoolhouse is on the right.

Groton has a 480-acre campus, including academic buildings, dormitories, athletic fields, and undeveloped land for conservation. The campus layout and landscape was designed by Frederick Law Olmsted, who also designed Central Park in New York City and many other educational institutions. The school's core buildings are arranged around a (mostly) circular lawn, and "The Circle" is the primary metonym for Groton's campus. In 2018, Architectural Digest named Groton the most beautiful private high school campus in Massachusetts.

The earliest surviving buildings on campus surround the Circle. Most of them were designed by Peabody & Stearns between 1884 and 1902. These buildings include the Brooks House dormitory (1884), the Fives Court (1890), the Hundred House dormitory (1891), the Schoolhouse (1899), and the old gymnasium (1902), the latter of which is now the dining hall. The present Chapel was consecrated in 1900.

Other architects who worked at Groton include Graham Gund (Campbell Performing Arts Center), R. Clipston Sturgis (Sturgis House and Gardner House), McKim, Mead & White (Norton House), and Henry Forbes Bigelow (Cutting House). More recently, the school built a solar battery farm and a net-zero emissions faculty residence to improve energy efficiency on campus.

The school's athletic facilities include the Athletic Center (which contains two hockey rinks, three basketball courts, twelve squash courts, and a swimming pool), a crew boathouse on the Nashua River, a track and field complex, and 18 tennis courts.

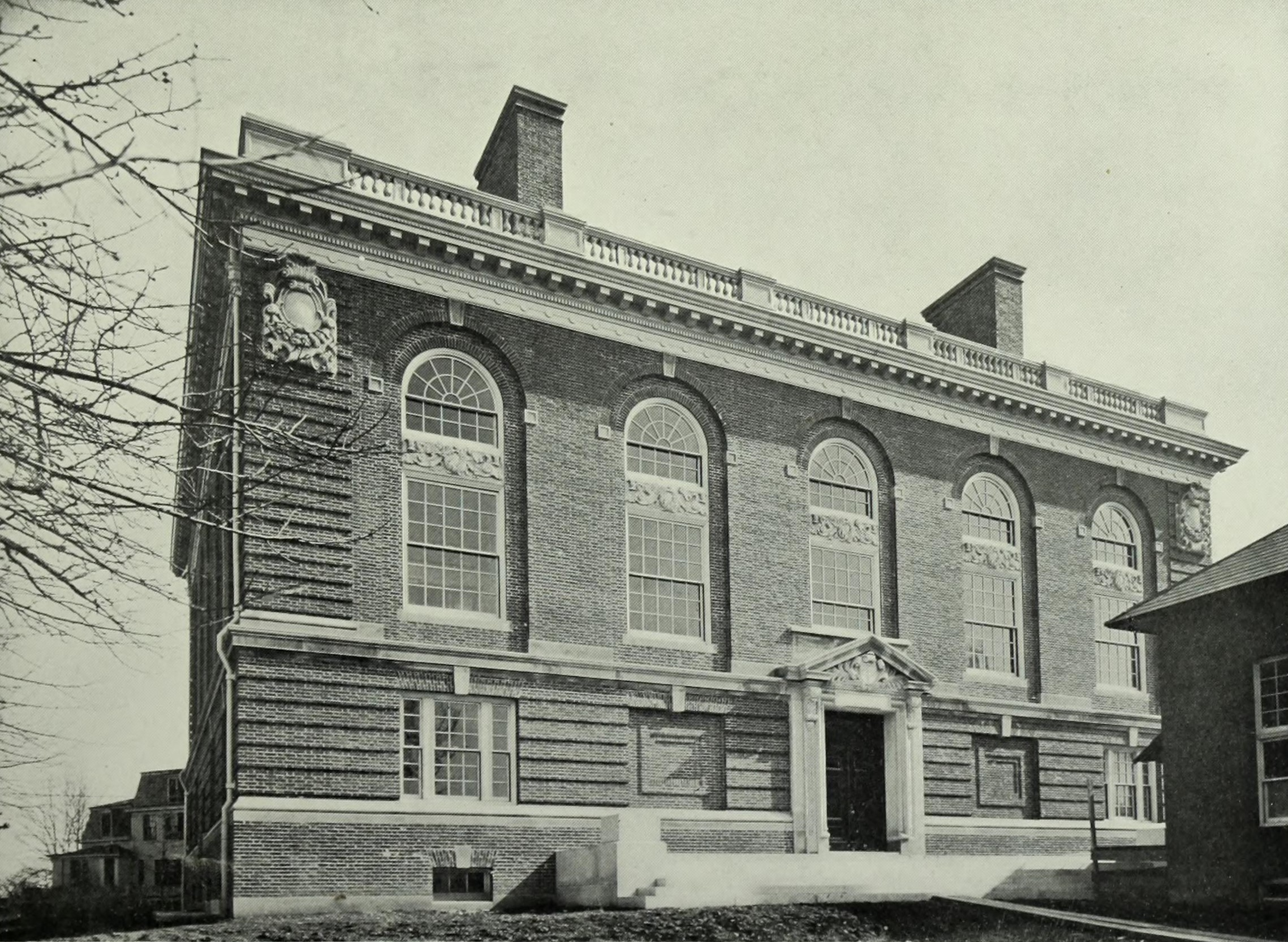
The Dining Hall (formerly the gymnasium).

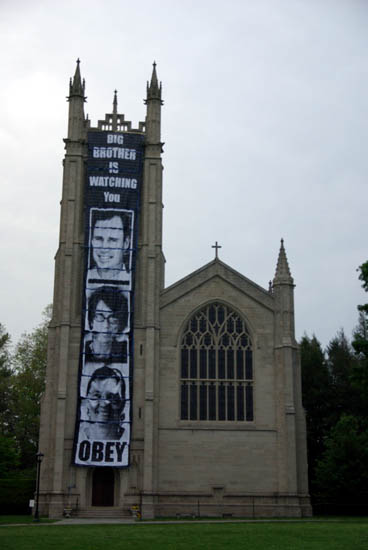
A light-hearted, three-story tiled poster that students mounted on the Chapel in 2008.

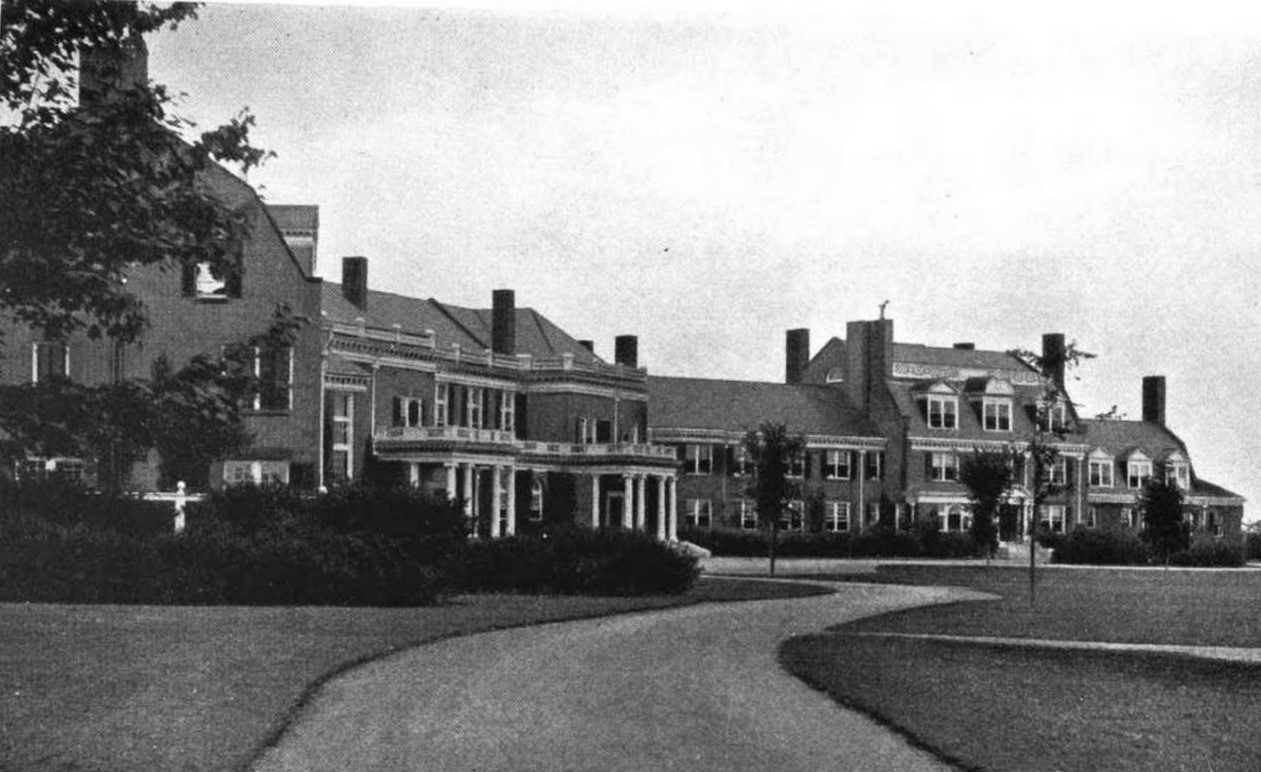
Most Upper Schoolers (10th–12th grades) live in Hundred House, which originally housed 100 students.

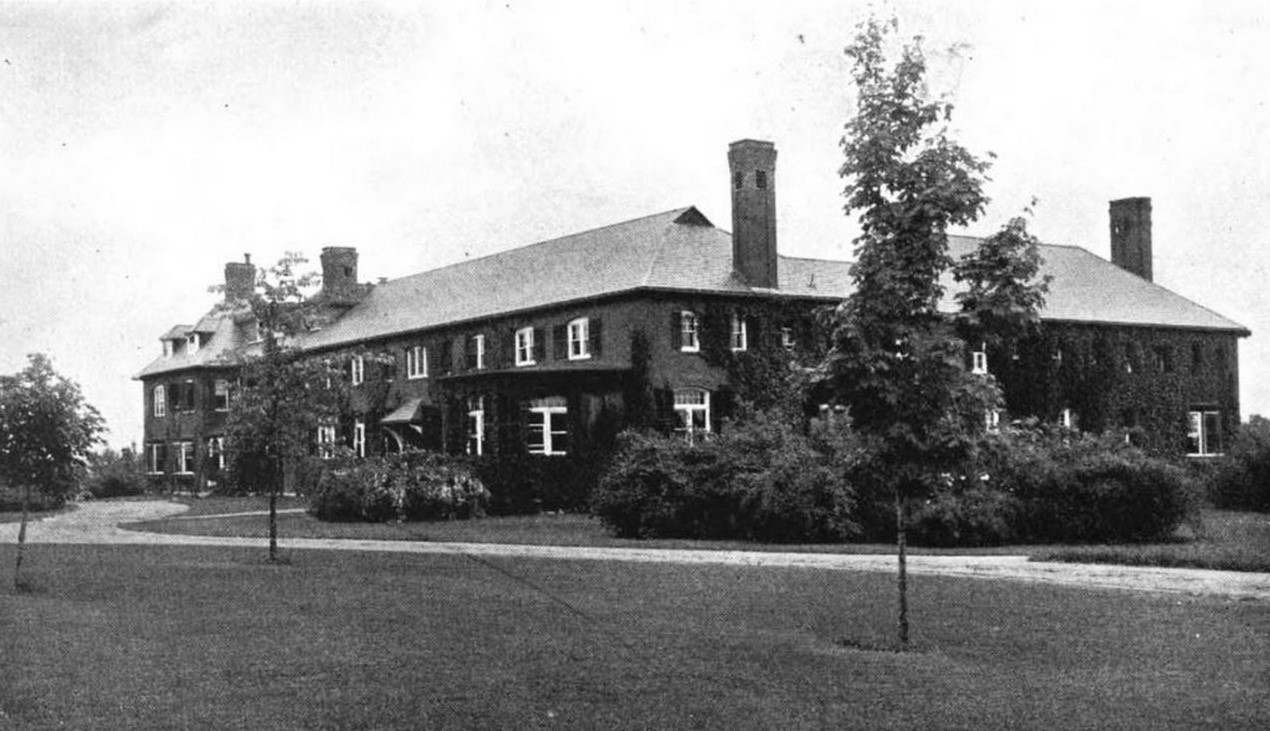
Lower Schoolers (8th and 9th grades) and some Upper Schoolers live in Brooks House, Groton's original building.

== Spiritual life ==
=== Chapel program ===
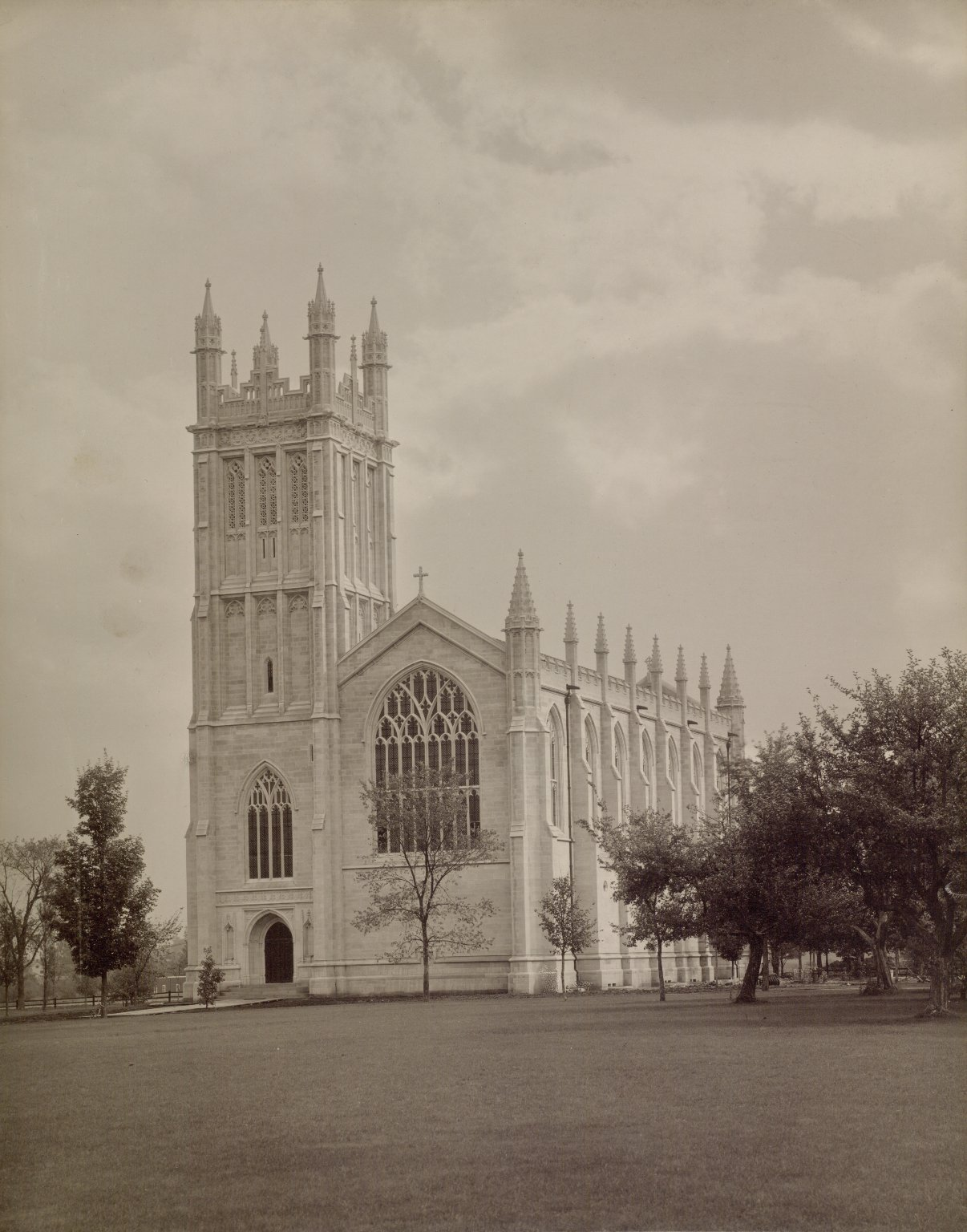
St. John's Chapel

St. John's Chapel opened in 1900. It was the gift of William Amory Gardner, one of the school's original teachers. It was designed by Henry Vaughan, who also designed Washington National Cathedral and the New Chapel at St. Paul's School. The Chapel replaced an earlier Vaughan design (now the Sacred Heart Church of Groton), which the school donated to the local Catholic community.

The Chapel's large size reflects the school's dual role as high school and parish church (cf. Christ Church, Oxford). Local landowners James and Prescott Lawrence donated the land for the campus on the understanding that the school would serve as the town's parish church, as there was no Episcopal church in Groton. In 1950, the school's pastoral responsibilities were transferred to its satellite church in Ayer.

The Chapel's Aeolian-Skinner pipe organ (b. 1935) was designed by G. Donald Harrison, and was one of the first American organs designed to play Baroque music. Over the next few decades, Harrison used the organ as a "laboratory" for the American Classic organ style.

Since 1929, the school has hosted an annual Festival of Nine Lessons and Carols, based on the version at King's College, Cambridge.

=== Episcopal heritage and ecumenicism ===
At Groton, students are required to attend five religious services a week: four ecumenical services on weekday mornings (comparable to morning assembly at a non-religious school) and one sectarian service of the student's choice on weekends. According to Catholic commentator William F. Buckley Jr., when a prospective Catholic parent asked Groton whether it would encourage his son to attend Sunday Mass, the school replied, "No, he won't be encouraged to. He'll be required to."

The school's Protestant liturgy and architecture reflect Endicott Peabody's low church tendencies. To this day, the Chapel does not have any pews for students except in the choir. One scholar has suggested that the relative lack of ritual at Sunday services helped attract non-Episcopalian students to the school. School chaplain Allison Read sits on the board of the National Association of Episcopal Schools.

The school's continued adherence to religious services on weekends has made it somewhat of an anomaly among Eastern boarding schools. In the 1990s, the aforementioned Buckley surveyed twelve American boarding schools and reported that Groton, Kent, and St. George's were the only schools in the study that required students to attend a sectarian religious service on the weekend. Since then, Kent has dropped its requirement, and St. George's moved its mandatory service to Thursdays. However, students have found ways to accommodate their own preferences. In 2018, a student wrote in the school newspaper that the Buddhist service (which allows students to use smartphones) has become a popular "catch-all for non-religious students."

=== Motto ===
Groton adopted its current motto, cui servire est regnare, in 1902. Its proper English translation has been debated over the years. The Anglican Communion still uses Thomas Cranmer's translation "in whose [God's] service is perfect freedom" from the original Anglican Book of Common Prayer. However, other sources, including the Catholic Church (Lumen gentium), have used the more straightforward translation "to serve [God] is to reign." The school acknowledges the validity of both translations.

The phrase cui servire est regnare was originally attributed to Saint Augustine, and has been used in Christian liturgies since the 8th century at the latest (Gelasian Sacramentary). The school adopted the motto after guest speaker Arthur C. A. Hall, the bishop of Vermont, used the term in a sermon on campus.

== Athletics ==
Groton's sports teams compete in the Independent School League (ISL), a group of boarding and day schools in Greater Boston. ISL schools may only award financial aid based on a family's ability to pay; as such, they do not offer athletic scholarships. In addition, ISL schools may not recruit post-graduate students, unlike the Founders League.

=== Sports ===
Groton offers 47 teams in 22 interscholastic programs.

Fall athletic offerings

- Cross country
- Field hockey (girls)
- Football (boys)
- Soccer
- Volleyball (girls)

Winter athletic offerings

- Basketball
- Ice hockey
- Squash
- Swimming

Spring athletic offerings

- Baseball (boys)
- Rowing
- Lacrosse
- Tennis
- Track and field

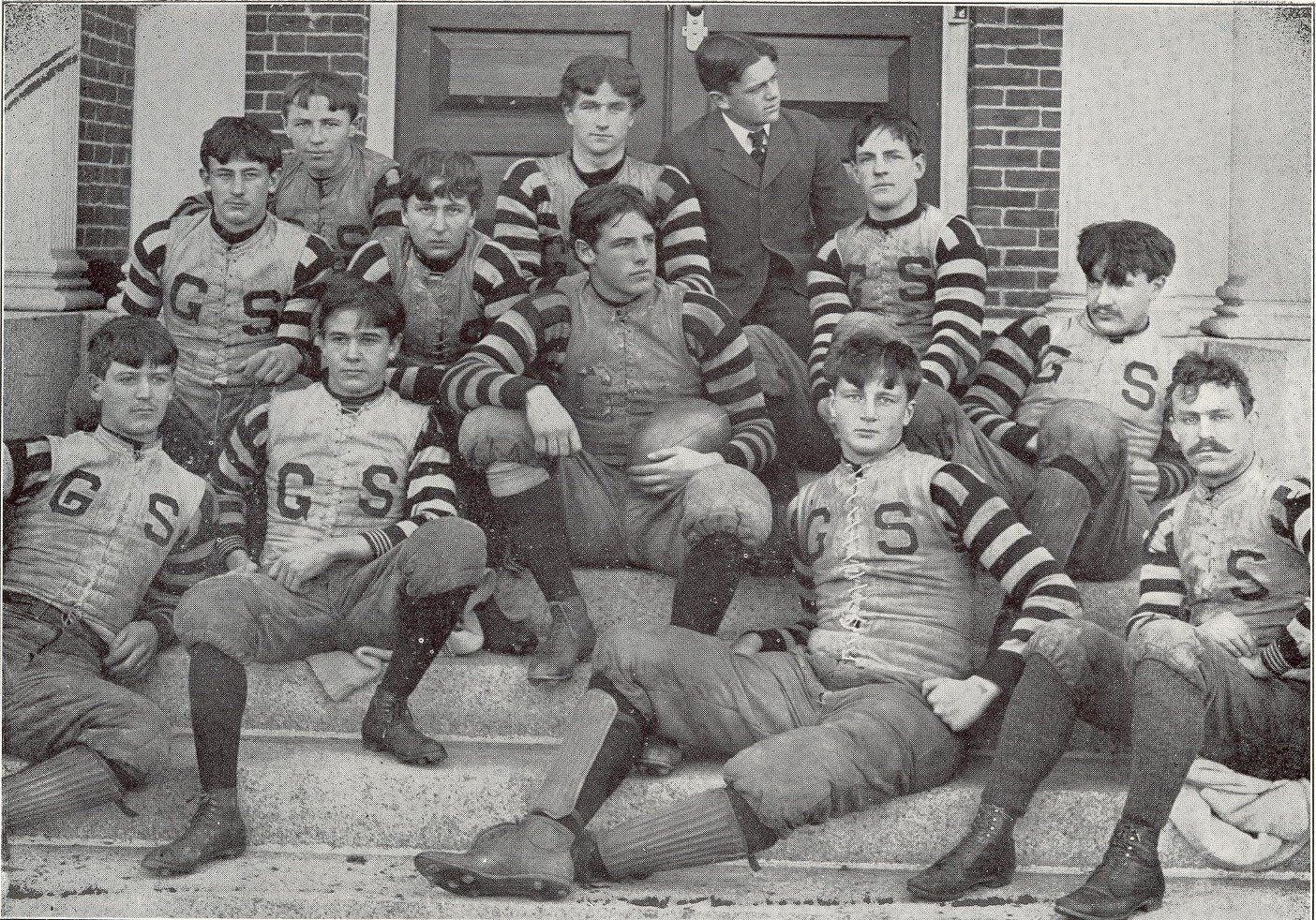
Photo of the 1894 football team, captained by Percy Haughton.

The Groton football team has produced three national championship-winning college football coaches, including four-time champion Percy Haughton, and four members of the College Football Hall of Fame. In 1905, when several colleges (including Stanford, California, Northwestern, and Duke) dropped football citing player safety, Endicott Peabody persuaded Theodore Roosevelt to push the remaining colleges to make the game safer by reforming the rules of football; this resulted in the legalization of the forward pass, the rule requiring 10 yards for a first down, and the creation of the neutral zone. The Groton football team won the ISL championship in 1997.

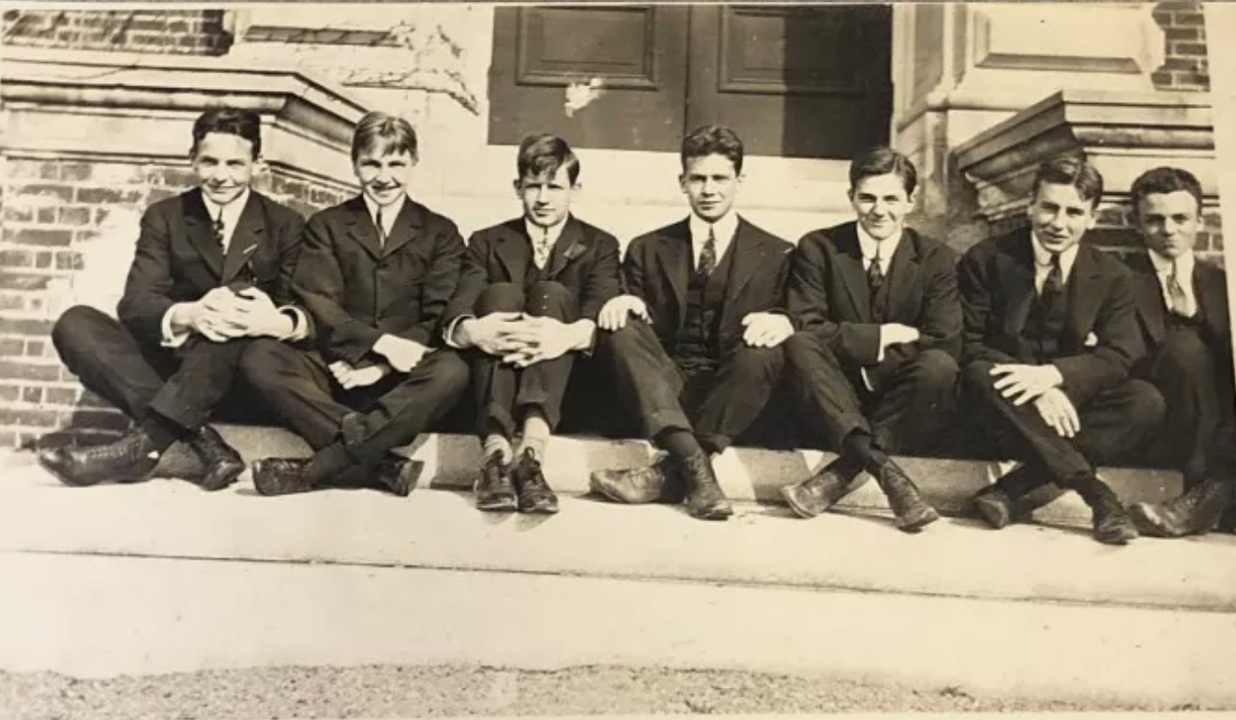
Photo of the 1912 ice hockey team, captained by sixth former Hasper (4th from right) and 1913 captain Taylor (2nd from right).

The Groton boys' crew has won nine New England championships and has produced five Olympic gold medalists (Frederick Sheffield '20, Howard T. "Ox" Kingsbury '22, Donald Beer '53, Charles Grimes '53, and Emory Clark '56) one Olympic silver medalist (Seymour "Sy" Cromwell '52), one Olympic bronze medalist (Ted Patton '84) and thirteen Olympic rowers overall (James Lawrence, Jr '25, Lawrence Terry '18, John Parker '85, Henry Nuzum '95, Liane Malcos '96 and Alex Karwoski '08). The younger Groton girls' crew has won four New England championships and has produced world champion Liane Malcos '96. Both teams send crews to the Henley Royal Regatta and Henley Women's Regatta with some regularity.

The Groton girls' tennis team won the ISL championship in 2023 and 2024. The Groton boys' tennis team won the ISL championship in 2018 and 2022. Both the Groton girls' and boys' squash teams won the 2020 U.S. high school team division three national championship. The Groton girls' Hockey team won the 2026 New England Preparatory School Athletic Council (NEPSAC) Girls' Ice Hockey Tournament Dorothy Howard Small school bracket.

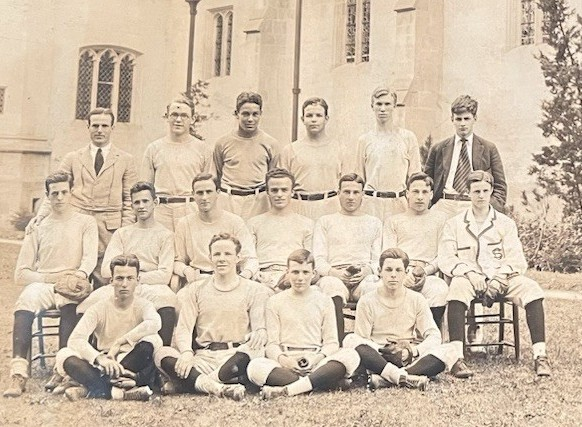
Photo of the 1915 baseball team, captained by Charles Fuller (second row 7th from right), Hamilton Coolidge (second row 5th from right), John Gardner Coolidge (second row 6th from right), Zabriskie, Canfield, Allen Ashburn, Jack Richardson, Robert Wales Emmons III, and E. Livingston Burrill

Groton alumni have produced two International Six Metre class Sailing Olympic gold medalists (James Hopkins Smith Jr. '27, John Adams Morgan '49).

=== Rivalries ===
Groton's sports rival is St. Mark's School. The two schools began playing in 1886 and contest the fifth-oldest high school football rivalry in the United States. The rivalry began when St. Mark's rejected Endicott Peabody for its vacant headmaster job on the basis that the school bylaws required the headmaster to be an Episcopal priest and Peabody had not yet been ordained, only to turn around and hire a different layperson for the position. It took on a friendlier tone when St. Mark's hired Peabody's deputy William Greenough Thayer as its new headmaster.

Groton's crews have rowed against Noble and Greenough School since 1922. This rivalry developed because historically, Groton and St. Mark's only played each other in football, baseball, and fives, although the schools now play in all sports.

Groton and St. Paul's School play each other in all sports and compete for a trophy. Groton also plays its neighbor Lawrence Academy in various sports, but because the ISL is split into different divisions for football and hockey, matchups are less frequent.

== In popular culture ==
- The school has inspired (to some extent) several novels, such as the boarding schools Justin Martyr in Louis Auchincloss '35's The Rector of Justin and Ault School in Curtis Sittenfeld '93's Prep. The New York Times has also speculated that Whooton School in J. D. Salinger's The Catcher in the Rye may have been based on Groton.
- During Franklin Delano Roosevelt '00's presidential administration, which popularized the use of radio broadcasts in politics, Roosevelt's distinctive Northeastern elite accent (sometimes described as a transatlantic accent) led various writers to hypothesize the existence of a "Groton accent" or "Groton voice," including F. Scott Fitzgerald (Tender Is the Night). The accent was soon linked to other Groton alumni, including Dean Acheson '12 and Averell Harriman '09. Some modern-day writers continue to use the term, but other researchers, including William Safire, have suggested that this form of "boarding school lockjaw" was taught by a wider range of Northeastern prep schools.
- Groton was a minor filming location for Alexander Payne's 2023 film The Holdovers, standing in for the fictional Barton Academy. The production team shot footage in the chapel (although most of the chapel scenes were shot at Northfield Mount Hermon) and outside Groton's boathouse on the Nashua River. As shown in the film, the west wall of the chapel has a large stained-glass window dedicated to the Groton alumni who died in World War I.
- In the TV show Gilmore Girls, Logan Huntzberger (Matt Czuchry) has a picture of Endicott Peabody from his time at Groton. Both characters Logan and Christopher Hayden (David Sutcliffe) claim to have been kicked out of Groton.
- In Wendy Wasserstein's play Third, a college professor is assigned to teach a Groton alumnus who, despite his WASPy name, attends the college on scholarship.
- In Robert Littell's novel The Company, several CIA officers are alumni of Groton, including the main character's (fictional) son and his (non-fictional) boss Richard Bissell.
- The school has been parodied in several The New Yorker cartoons.
