= Monument Park =

Monument Park may refer to:

- Monument Park, Pretoria, South Africa
- Monument Park (Yankee Stadium), New York
- Monument Park, Lynn Haven, Florida, USA
- Monument Park, in Point Roberts, Washington, USA; westernmost point of the US/Canada border on the 49th parallel

== See also ==
- Monument Park High School, Kraaifontein, Western Cape
- Monument Park Historic District, Fitchburg, Massachusetts
- Fallen Monument Park, Moscow
