= Henry M. Francis =

American architect

Henry Martyn Francis
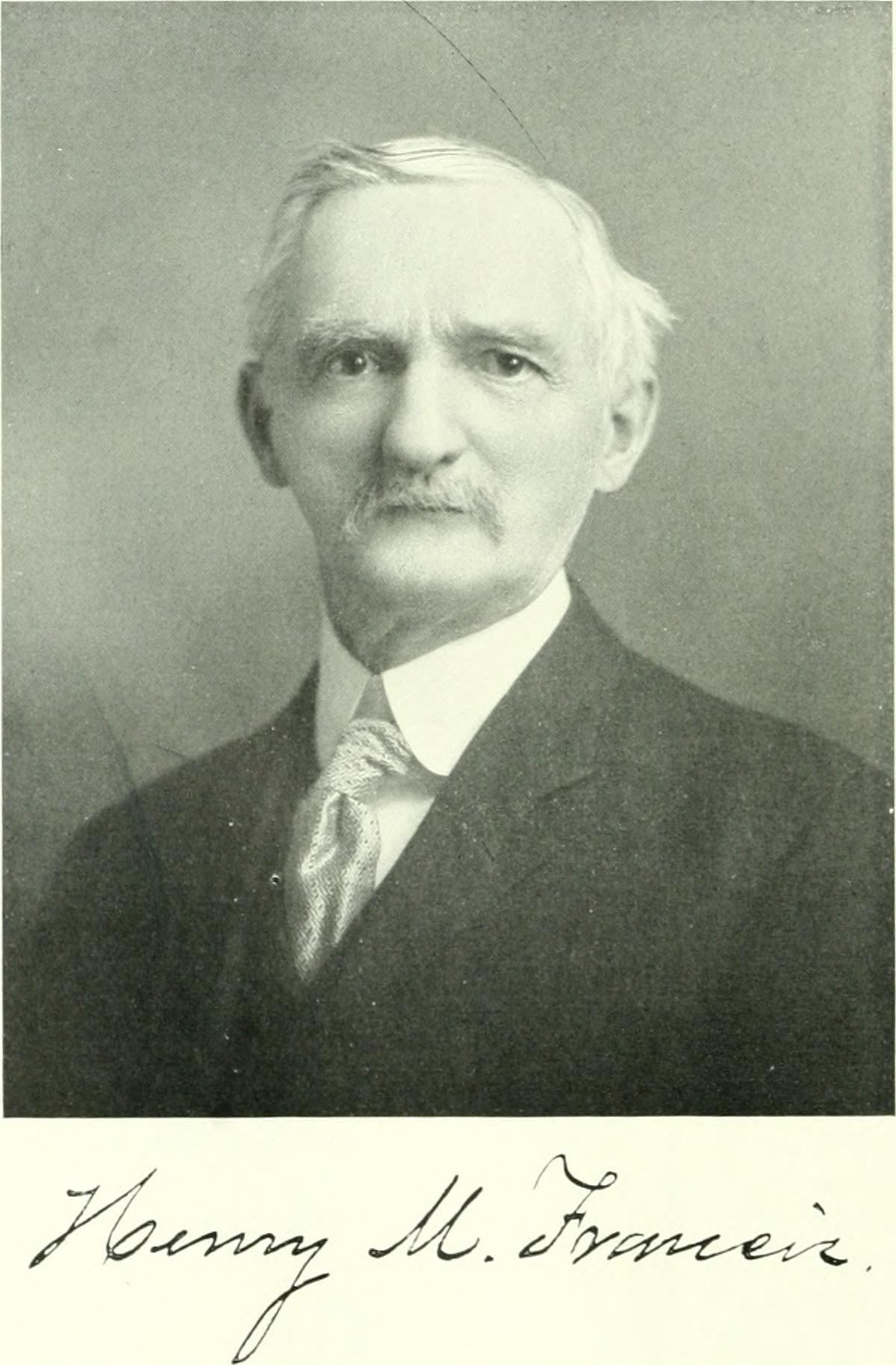
- Henry M. Francis, c. 1907
- Born: June 13, 1836; Lunenburg, Massachusetts
- Died: October 13, 1908 (aged 72); Fitchburg, Massachusetts
- Occupation: Architect

Henry M. Francis (June 13, 1836 – October 13, 1908), often known as H. M. Francis, was an architect in Massachusetts. A number of his works, alone or with sons, are listed on the United States National Register of Historic Places. His finest work may be the Murdock School in Winchendon, Massachusetts, built in 1887.

== Life and career ==
Henry Martyn Francis was born June 16, 1836, in Lunenburg, Massachusetts to Franklin Samuel and Jane (Kimball) Francis. He attended the Lunenburg public schools and Lawrence Academy and in 1858 left Massachusetts to work as a surveyor in New York, where he was employed on expansions of the Croton Water Works. Late in the same year he returned to Massachusetts and began the study of architecture with Boston architect Alexander R. Esty. From 1861 to 1864 he worked as a carpenter in Lunenburg, Westfield and Florence, Massachusetts. In 1864 he began working for George F. Meacham in Boston, and the following year went to Portland, Maine where he worked for George M. Harding. He was employed by Harding during the reconstruction of the city after the fire of 1866.

In 1868 Francis moved to Fitchburg and established an architecture practice. Francis was sole proprietor of his practice until 1903, when he formed a partnership with his two sons, Frederick L. Francis and Albert F. Francis. Though the elder Francis died in 1908, the firm of H. M. Francis & Sons was operated by his sons until the outbreak of World War II.

== Personal life ==
Francis married in 1867 to Emily Josephine Leighton of Bloomfield, now Skowhegan, Maine. They had three children, two sons and a daughter. His two sons, Frederick Leighton Francis (1870-1919) and Albert Franklin Francis (1875-1946) would both study architecture in his office before their partnership was formed. Frederick L. had additional training from the Massachusetts Institute of Technology, having graduated in 1892.

Henry M. Francis died October 13, 1908, at home in Fitchburg. He had been partially paralyzed since 1906.

== Legacy ==
Many buildings designed by Francis and his sons have been listed on the United States National Register of Historic Places.

== Architectural works ==
- Rollstone Congregational Church, Fitchburg, Massachusetts (1868–70)
- Butler School (former), Groton, Massachusetts (1871, altered 1928, NRHP 2010)
- Wallace Library and Art Building, Fitchburg, Massachusetts (1884, demolished 1965)
- First Universalist Church (former), Fitchburg, Massachusetts (1886)
- Murdock School, Winchendon, Massachusetts (1887, NRHP 1988)
- Addition of Parish Hall of First Parish Church, Fitchburg, Massachusetts (1888–89)
- Fitchburg High School (former), Fitchburg, Massachusetts (1893–95, burned 1934)
- Phoenix Building, Fitchburg, Massachusetts (1893)
- Wallace Building, Fitchburg, Massachusetts (1893, demolished)
- Y. M. C. A. Building (former), Fitchburg, Massachusetts (1894, altered)
- Safety Fund National Bank, Fitchburg, Massachusetts (1895, NRHP 2009)
- Calvinistic Congregational Church, Fitchburg, Massachusetts (1896, NRHP 1979)
- Addition to Westford Town Farm, Westford, Massachusetts (1900, NRHP 2008)
- Kimball Public Library, Randolph, Vermont (1902, NRHP 1985)
- Tucker Free Library, Henniker, New Hampshire (1903–04, NHSRHP 2015)
- Hosmer School, Fitchburg, Massachusetts (1907)
- Goffstown Public Library, Goffstown, New Hampshire (1909, NRHP 1995)
- Fitchburg Historical Society (former), Fitchburg, Massachusetts (1911–12, NRHP 2003)
- Addition to Stevens Memorial Library (former), (Note: Listed on the United States National Register of Historic Places in 1999 as part of the Ashburnham Center Historic District.) Ashburnham, Massachusetts (1925)

== Gallery of architectural works ==
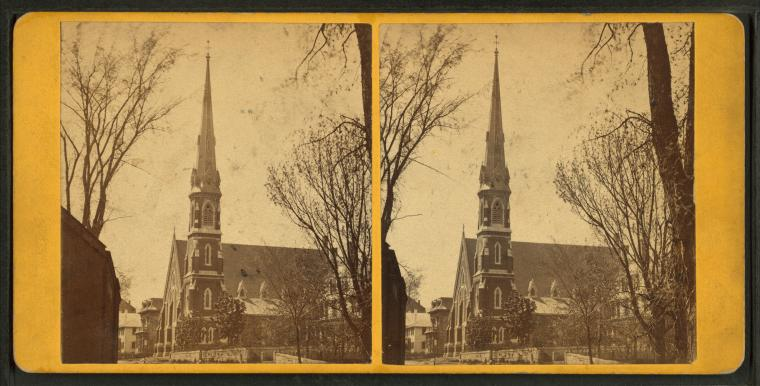
Rollstone Congregational Church, Fitchburg, Massachusetts, 1868-70.

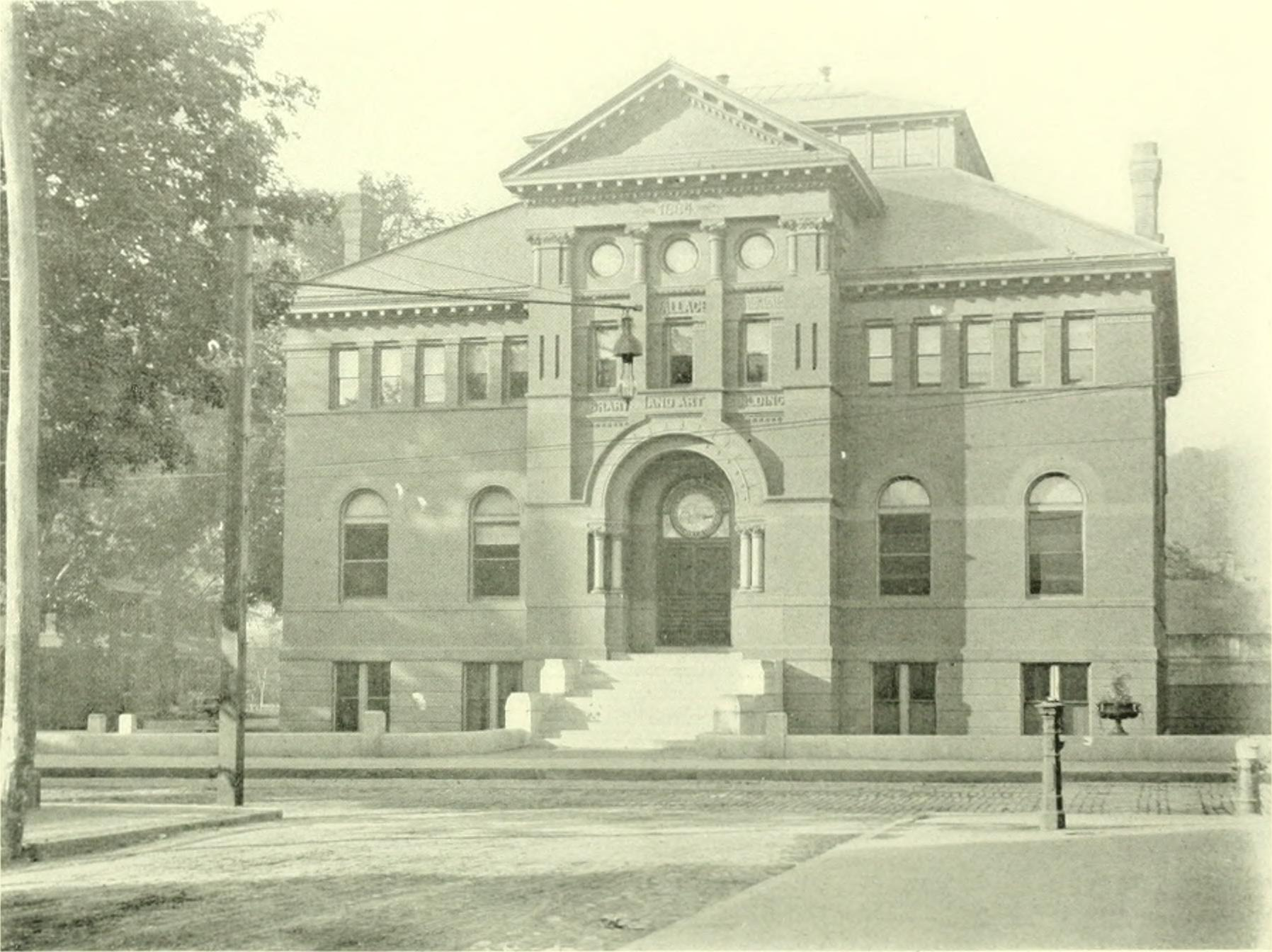
Wallace Library and Art Building, Fitchburg, Massachusetts, 1884.

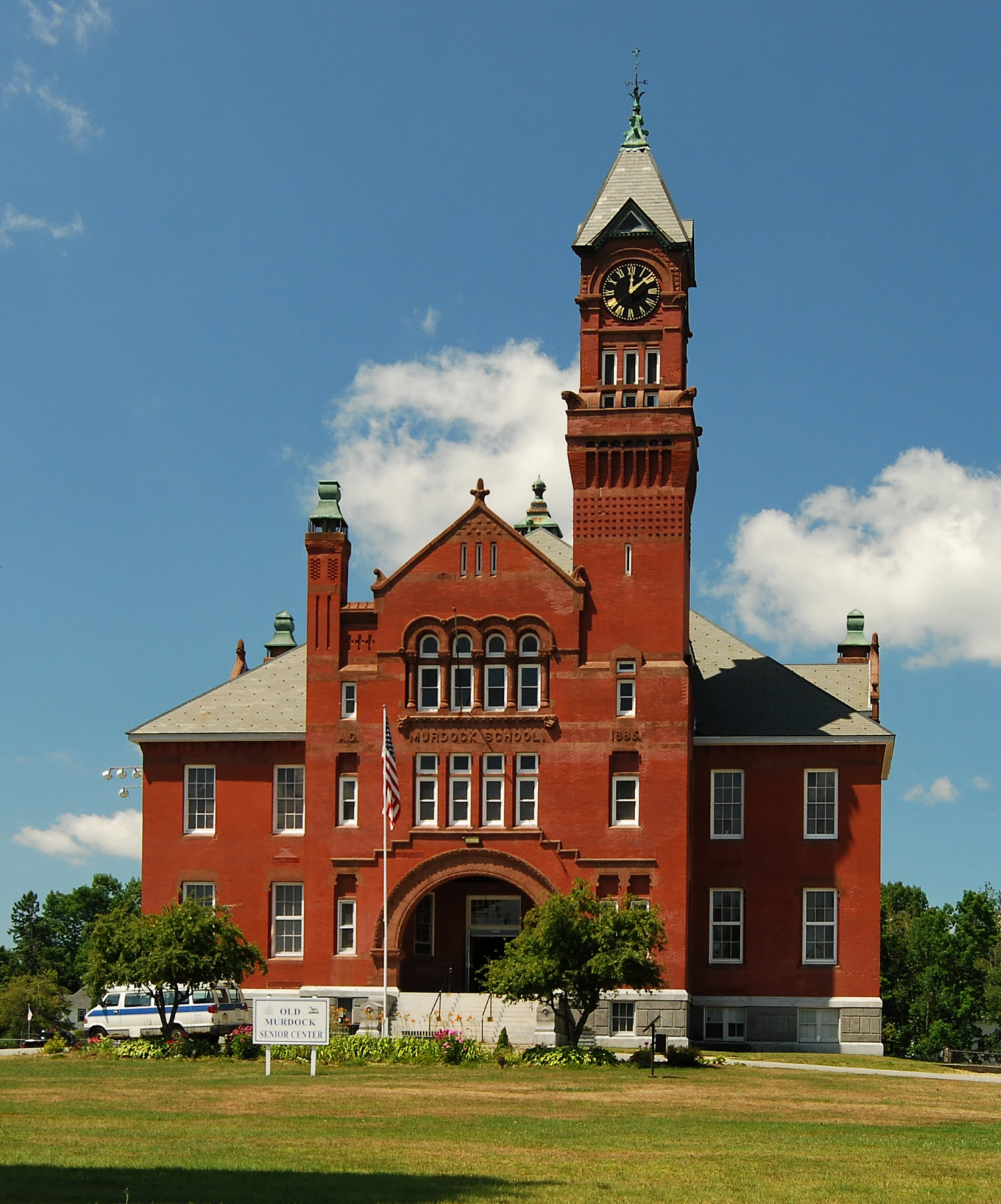
Murdock School, Winchendon, Massachusetts, 1887.

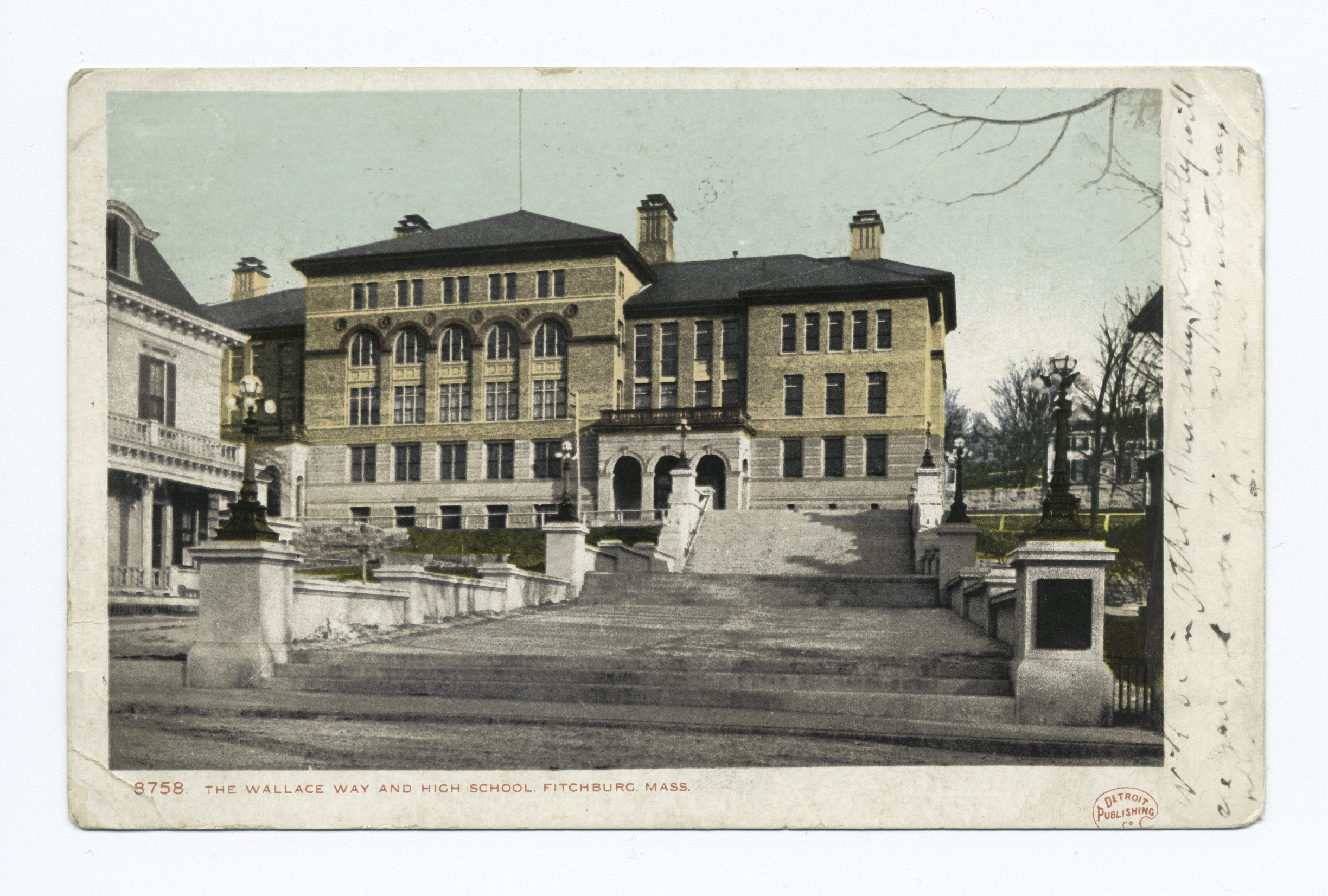
Fitchburg High School, Fitchburg, Massachusetts, 1893-95.

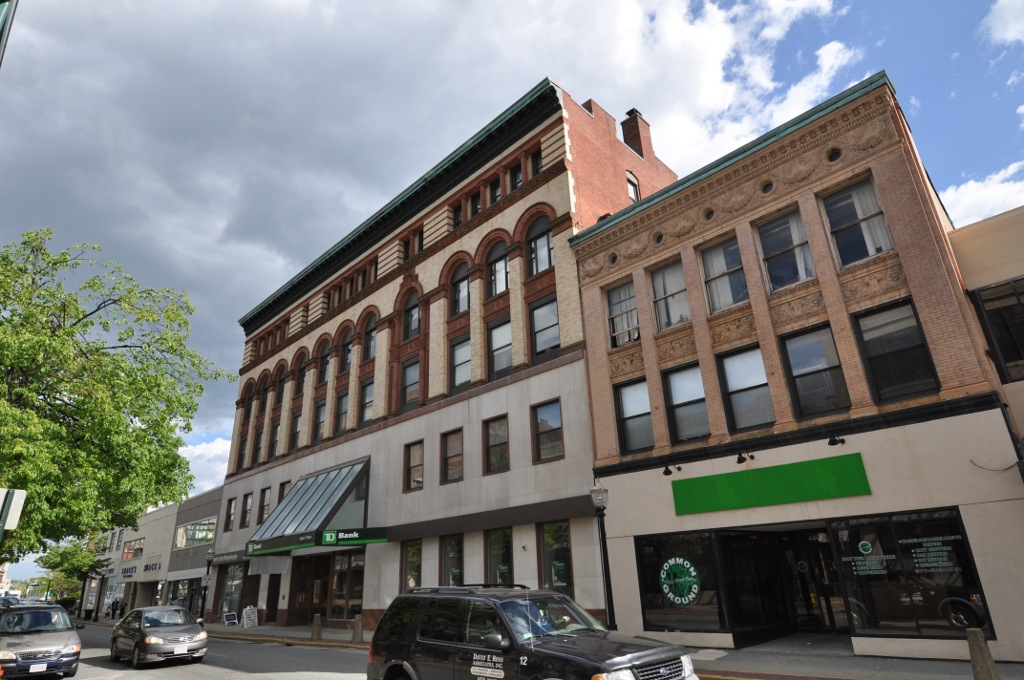
Safety Fund National Bank, Fitchburg, Massachusetts, 1895.

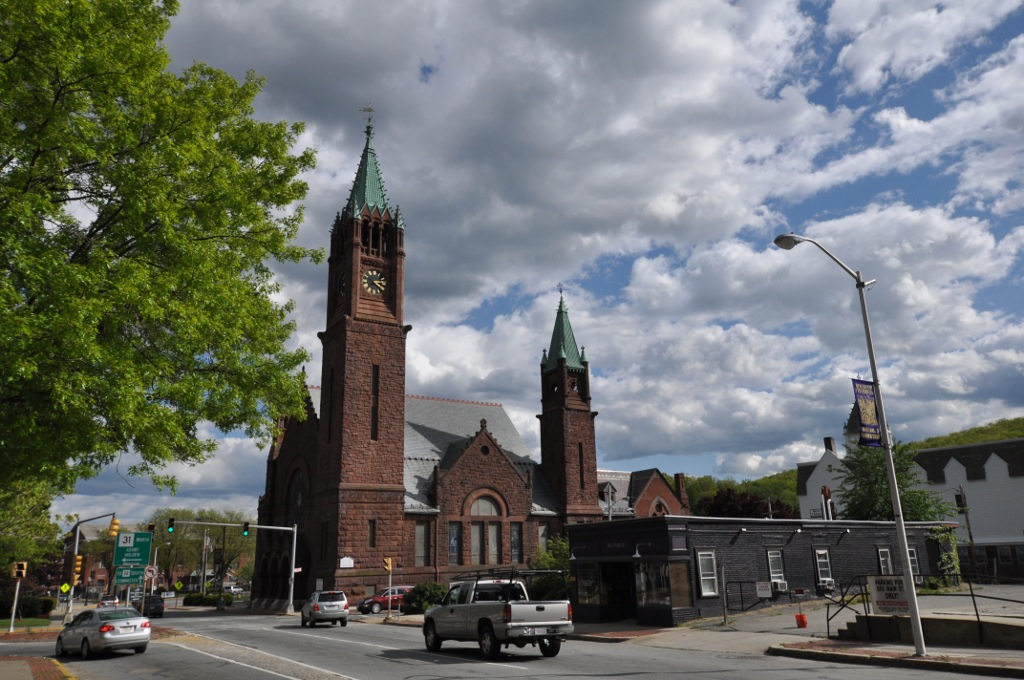
Calvinistic Congregational Church, Fitchburg, Massachusetts, 1896.

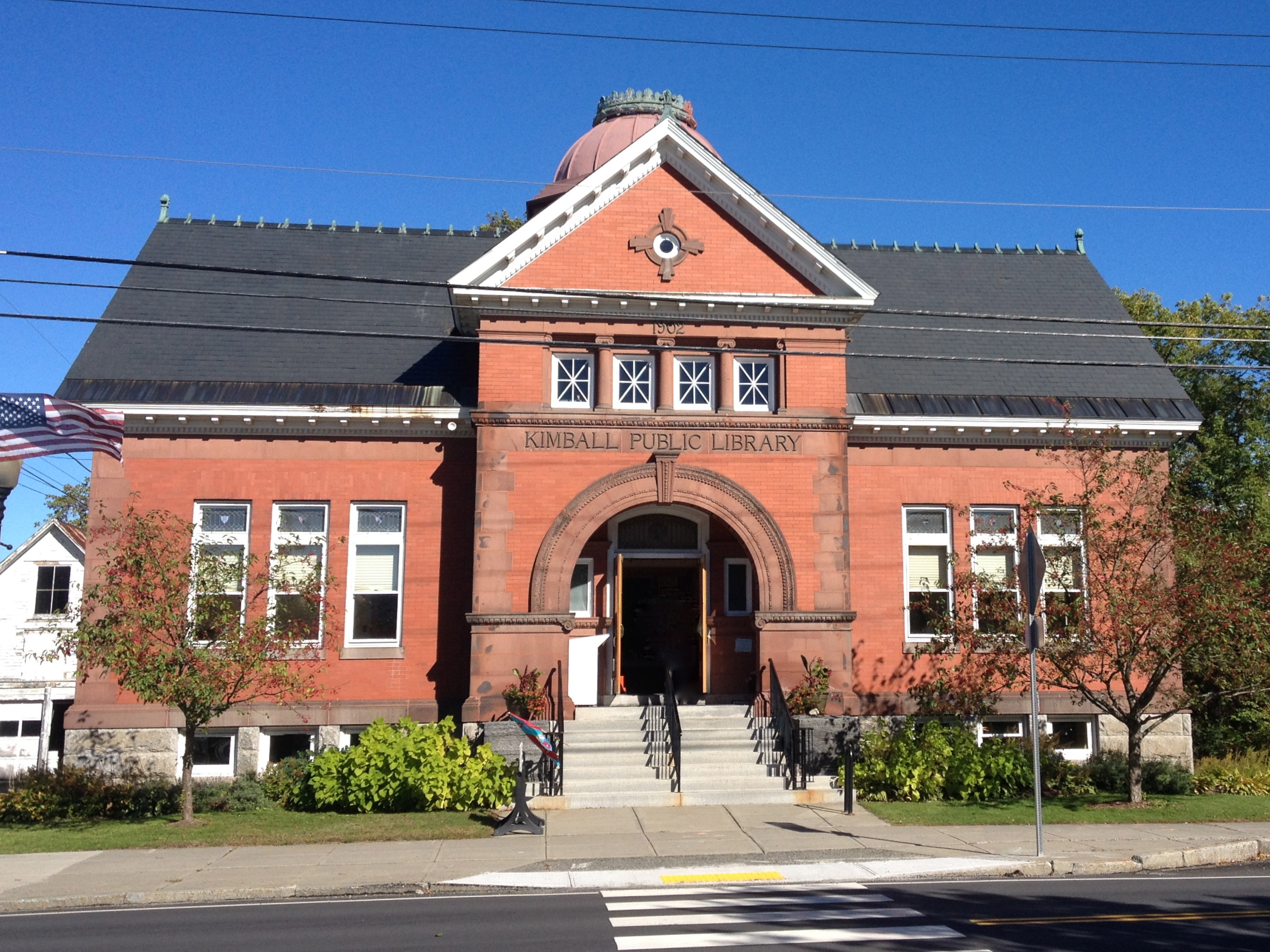
Kimball Public Library, Randolph, Vermont, 1902.

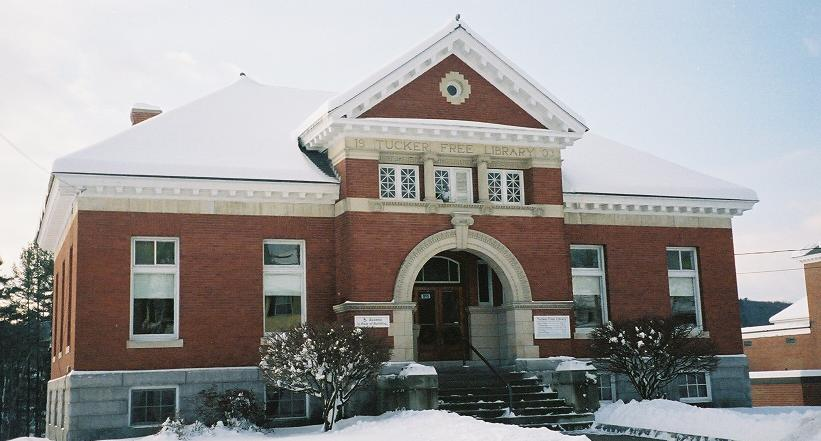
Tucker Free Library, Henniker, New Hampshire, 1903-04.

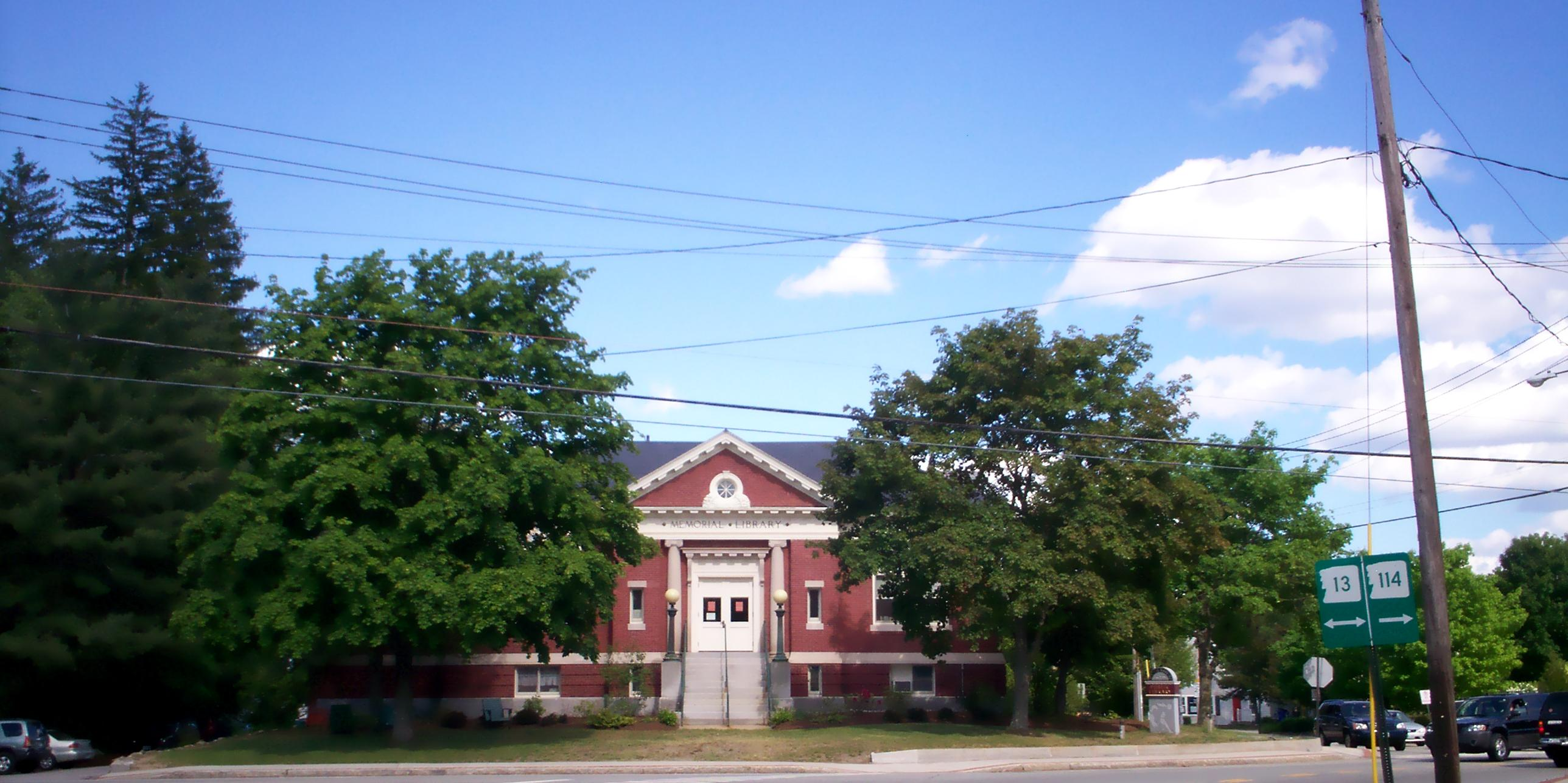
Goffstown Public Library, Goffstown, New Hampshire, 1909.

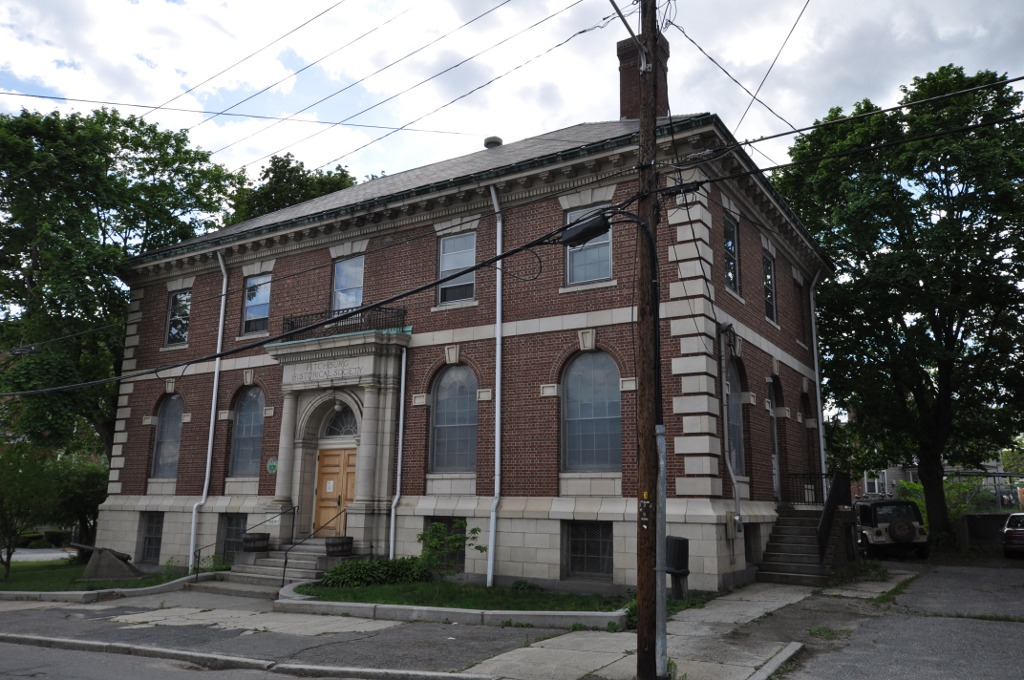
Fitchburg Historical Society, Fitchburg, Massachusetts, 1911-12.
