= Murdock School =

- U.S. National Register of Historic Places
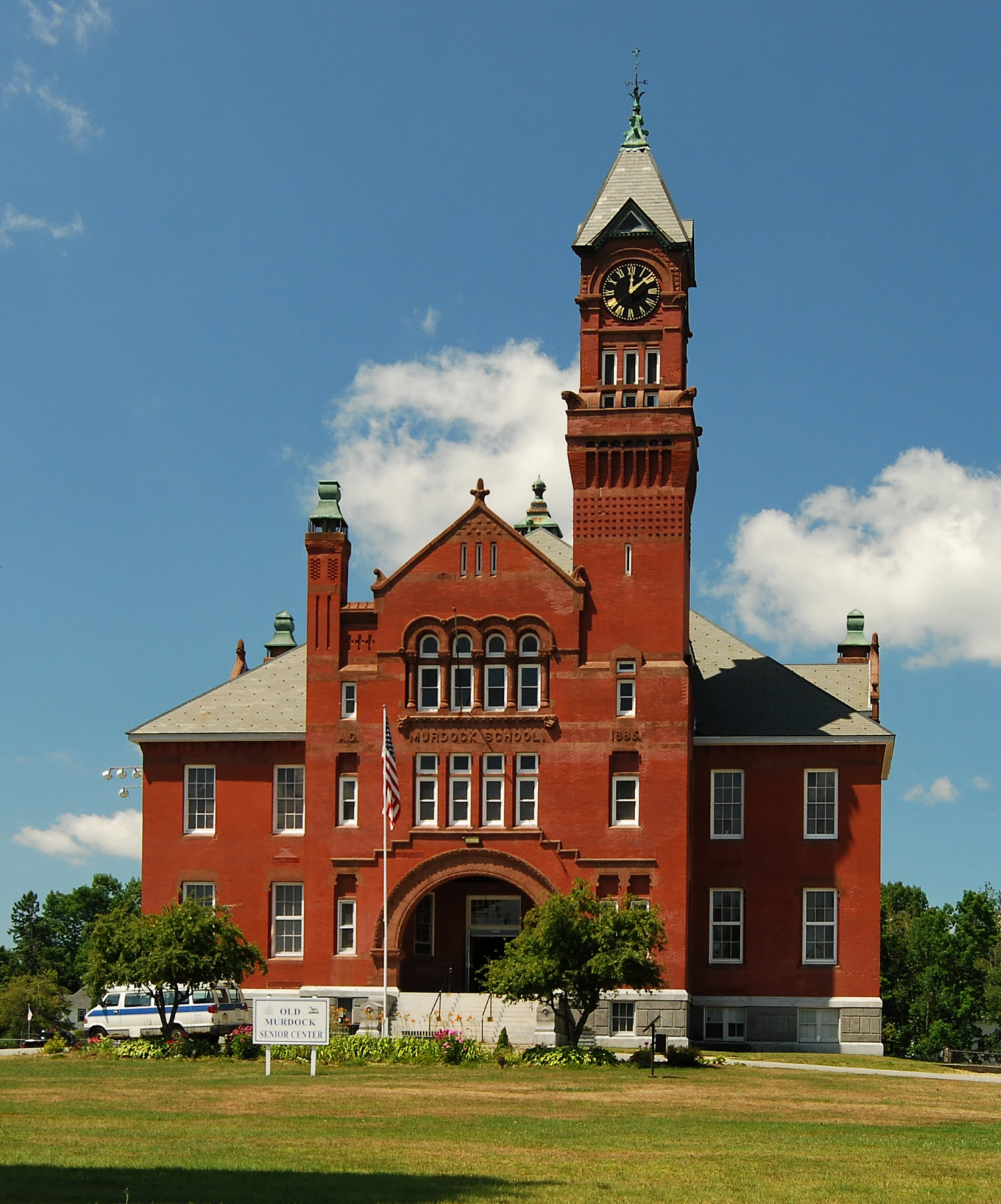
- Murdock School

- Location within Massachusetts Location within the United States
- Location: Murdock Ave., Winchendon, Massachusetts
- Coordinates: 42°41′07″N 72°03′13″W
- Area: 2 acres (0.81 ha)
- Built: 1887
- Architect: Francis, Henry M.; Morse, Henry G.
- Architectural style: Romanesque
- NRHP reference No.: 87002562
- Added to NRHP: January 28, 1988

The Murdock School, also known as Old Murdock High School, is an historic school building on Murdock Avenue in Winchendon, Massachusetts. Built in 1887 to a design by Henry M. Francis, it is the town's most architecturally elaborate school building. It served as the town's high school until 1961, and now houses the local council on the aging. The building was listed on the National Register of Historic Places in 1988.

== Description and history ==
The former Murdock School building is located in the town center of Winchendon, on 2 acres (0.81 ha) flanking the west side of Monument Park, west of the commercial downtown area. It is 2-1/2 story masonry structure, built out of red brick and covered by a slate roof. It is richly detailed in the Romanesque style, with a gabled pavilion projecting from its front facade. Prominent features of the projecting section are a tall square tower at the right side, with a pyramidal roof topped by a copper finial and cross. The left side of the projection has a less tall chimney adorned with brick corbelling and covered by a copper cap. The main entrance is in the center of the projection, recessed under a wide round arch.

The school was built in 1887 with funds donated by Captain Ephraim Murdock, Jr., whose father had previously donated the Winchendon Academy building to the town, and was a friend of educator Horace Mann. Operation of the school was originally funded by a trust fund established by Murdock, providing a college preparatory education at no cost to Winchendon students, and was administered by the town's school committee. In the early 20th century, the trust fund began to run out of funds, and the town took over funding. The building served the town as a school building until 1962, when a new high school (now an elementary school) was built to the north. The Murdock School was remodeled in 1974 and reopened in 1975 as part of a "middle school complex" in which grades six, seven, and eight varied in location between the Murdock, Poland, and Amro W. Streeter school buildings.

== Murdock School in art ==
"Old Murdock Deconstructed" - Bret Woodard, 2017

"Old Murdock High" - Mark Lore, 2021

== See also ==
- National Register of Historic Places listings in Worcester County, Massachusetts
