= Goffstown Main Street Historic District =

Historic district in New Hampshire, United States

- U.S. National Register of Historic Places
- U.S. Historic district
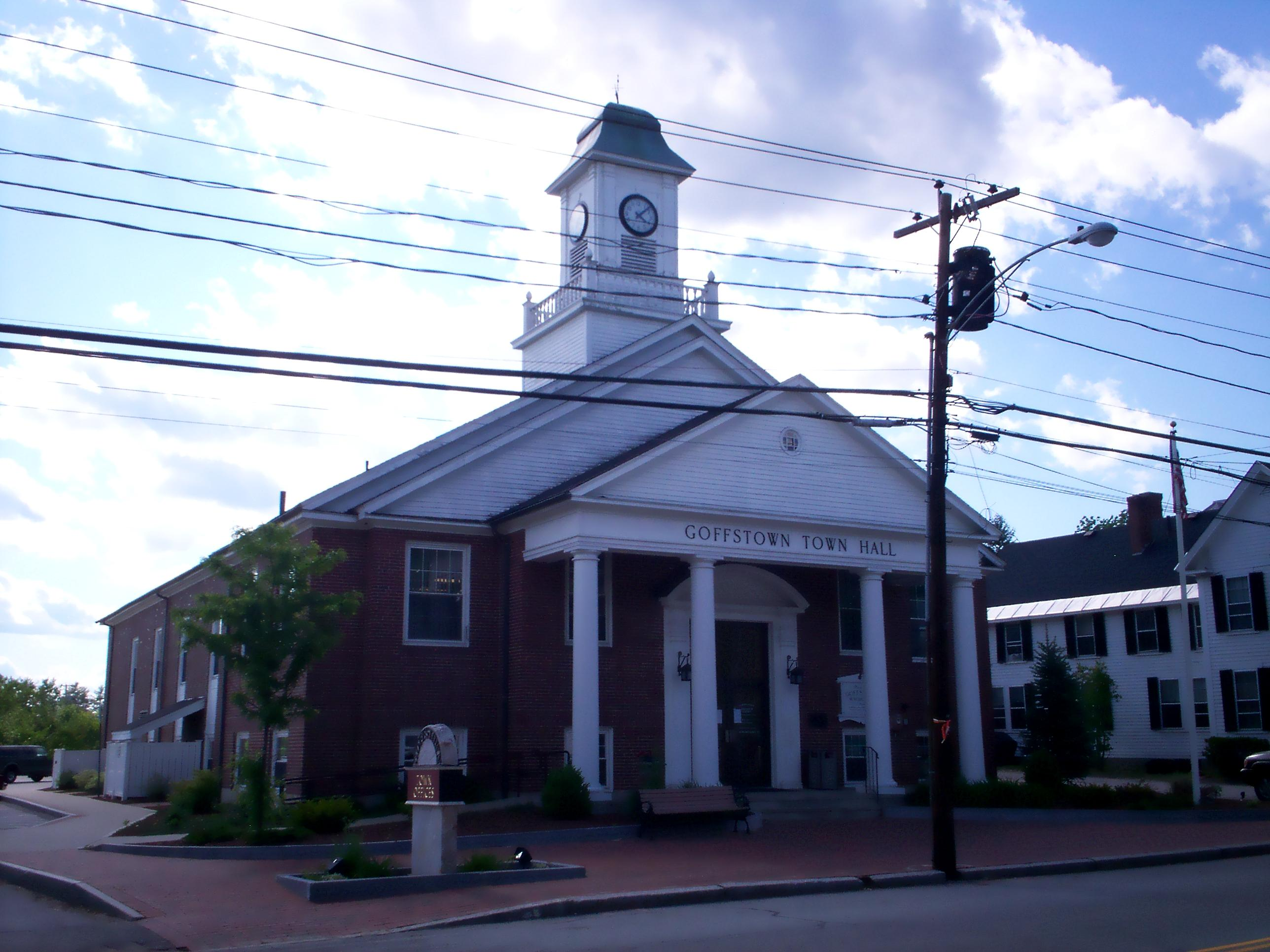

- Location within New Hampshire Location within the United States
- Location: Selected buildings on Church St., Depot St., High St., Main St., and N. Mast St., Goffstown, New Hampshire
- Coordinates: 43°1′9″N 71°36′0″W
- Area: 9 acres (3.6 ha)
- Architectural style: Second Empire, Italianate
- NRHP reference No.: 07000153
- Added to NRHP: March 15, 2007

The Goffstown Main Street Historic District is a historic district encompassing the historic 19th-century center of Goffstown, New Hampshire. Most of the district's 23 buildings lie on Main Street (New Hampshire Route 114), in a 0.5-mile (0.80 km) running north from the Piscataquog River to North Mast Street (the continuation of NH 114). The district also includes properties on Depot Street and Church Street, west of Main Street. It was listed on the National Register of Historic Places in 2007.

Goffstown's first town center, established when the town was first settled in the 1740s, was in what is now Grasmere Village, east of the present center. A bridge was built near the present center in 1766, to facilitate the movement of felled trees used as ship masts by the Royal Navy, and a gristmill was built adjacent to the nearby falls. The railroad arrived at that point in 1850, after which what had been "West Village" became the dominant village. A town hall was built on Main Street in 1869, which burned in 1937 and a replacement built in 1947. The public library was added in 1901, and is separately listed on the National Register. The district includes a variety of houses, many dating to the early 19th century, and a few commercial buildings along Main Street.

In addition to municipal buildings, there are two churches and several railroad-related buildings. The Goffstown Congregational Church, also separately listed, is the fourth meetinghouse for a congregation founded in 1768; it is a wood-frame structure built in 1840 and given a Queen Anne restyling in the 1890s. The Methodist Episcopal Church, built in 1889, is an L-shaped wood-frame structure facing North Mast and Summer Streets. There are two train depots: a passenger-only station built in 1880, and now on the grounds of the local hardware store, and an earlier freight-and-passenger station, a utilitarian structure built in 1850 and moved onto Depot Street to make way for the second building.

There are two unusual objects in the district. One is a popcorn stand, which has been used during the warmer months since the 1930s, and is now operated by the local Lion's Club. At the northwest corner of High and North Mast Streets is a 19th-century horse watering trough, which is now used as a planter.

== See also ==
- National Register of Historic Places listings in Hillsborough County, New Hampshire
