= Westford Town Farm =

- U.S. National Register of Historic Places
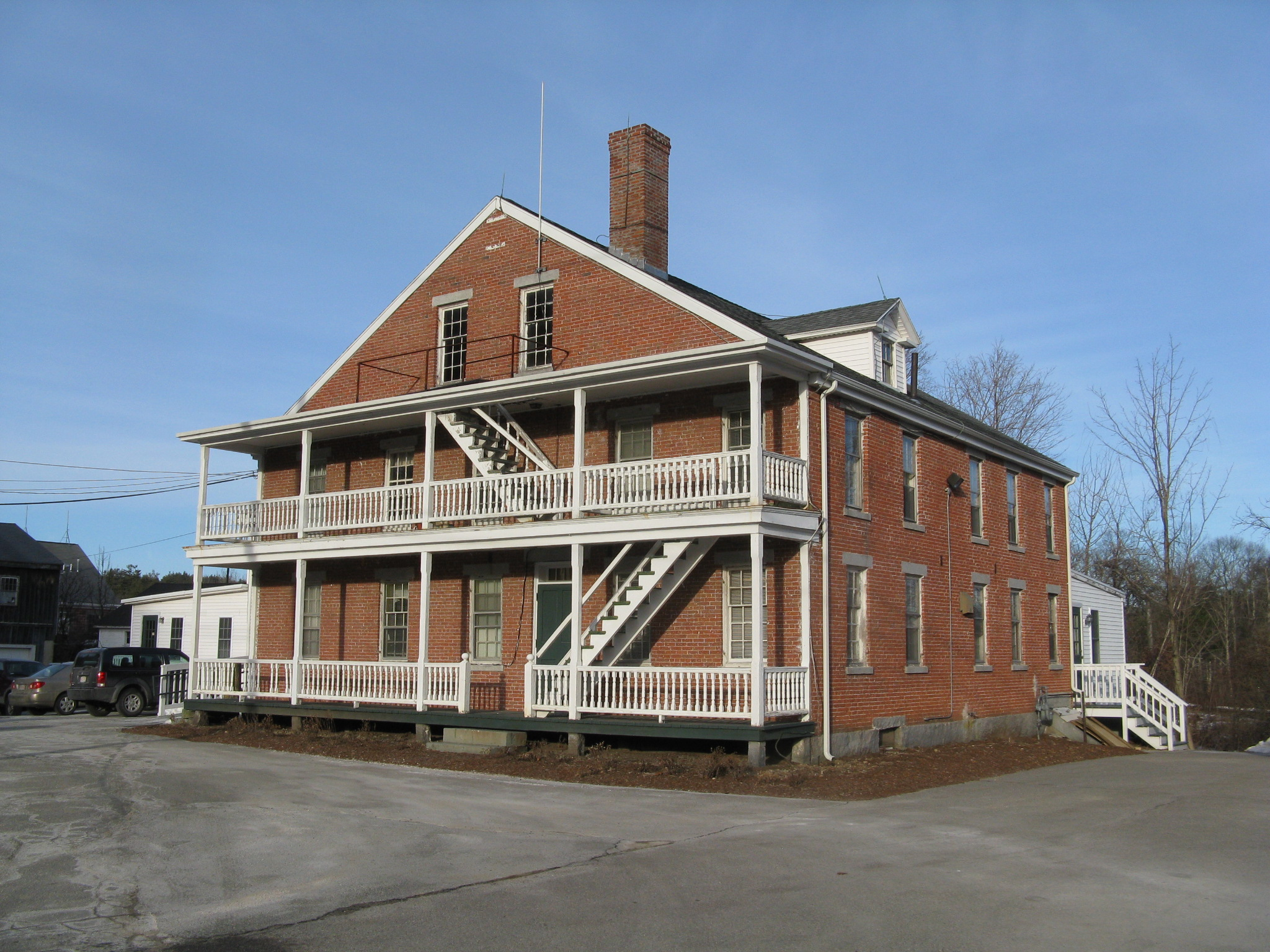
- Town Farm building

- Location within Massachusetts Location within the United States
- Location: 35 Town Farm Road, Westford, Massachusetts
- Coordinates: 42°35′11″N 71°28′44″W
- Built: 1893
- Architect: Daniel W. Hartwell, Henry M. Francis
- Architectural style: Greek Revival
- NRHP reference No.: 08000167
- Added to NRHP: March 14, 2008

Westford Town Farm is a historic poor farm in Westford, Massachusetts. Its main building is a 2 1/2 story brick building, five bays wide and six deep, that was built in 1837. It was twice enlarged, in c. 1840 and c. 1900. The enlargement consists of a wood-frame addition on the north side of the building; the 1900 addition was built to replace that from 1840, and stands on its foundation. It served as the focal point for the town's support of its indigent population until 1959, a later date than many similar facilities statewide remained open. Since its closing it has continued to house town facilities, including as police and fire stations, and most recently as school administrative offices.

The property was listed on the National Register of Historic Places in 2008.

== See also ==
- National Register of Historic Places listings in Middlesex County, Massachusetts
