= Calvinistic Congregational Church =

Historic church in Massachusetts, United States

- U.S. National Register of Historic Places
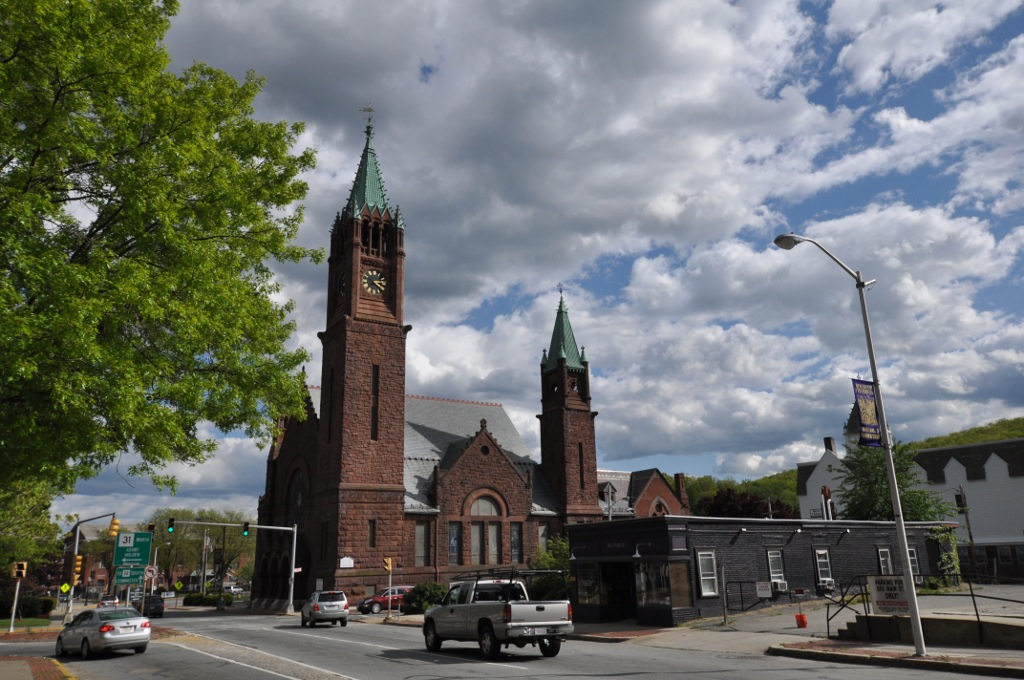

- Location within Massachusetts Location within the United States
- Location: Fitchburg, Massachusetts
- Coordinates: 42°35′6″N 71°48′19″W
- Built: 1896
- Architect: Francis, Henry M.
- Architectural style: Romanesque
- NRHP reference No.: 79000371
- Added to NRHP: June 15, 1979

The Calvinistic Congregational Church is an historic church building located at 820 Main Street in Fitchburg, Massachusetts. In 1967, the congregation joined with the First United Methodist Church of Fitchburg to form a cooperative ministry called Faith United Parish. Built in 1896, the church was designed by architect Henry M. Francis, and is one of the city's finest examples of Richardsonian Romanesque architecture. It was added to the National Register of Historic Places in 1979. Since 2018 the building has been owned by the Casa De Gracia y Restauración (House of Grace and Restoration).

== Architecture and history ==
The Calvinistic Congregational Church building stands at the southern end of the Fitchburg Upper Common, adjacent to the city's central business district. It is a rectangular structure, built out of red sandstone and brick. Its gable roof is oriented parallel to Rollstone Street, which runs just north of the building. The front gable is stepped and is topped by a finial; a lower cross gable on the side is also stepped. A tall tower, over 158 feet (48 m) in height, stands at the corner of the two streets, rising to a clock level, belfry, and octagonal spire. A lower tower stands at the right rear of the sanctuary, the cross gable between them set above a group of four windows with a half-round window above the center two. The interior decoration includes five Tiffany windows.

The congregation that had the church built in 1896 was founded in 1802 as a traditional Congregationalist alternative to Fitchburg's first church, founded in 1768 and converted to Unitarianism at the time of the split. This congregation built its first church in 1806, and a larger one in 1845. The present building was built, its design probably a gift of local architect Henry M. Francis, who was one of its parishioners late in his career. The church is one of his finest examples of the Richardsonian Romanesque style, and one of the finest example of that style in the city.

The Calvinist Congregational Church, its enrollment declining, entered a ministry union with the First United Methodist Church (formerly located on Fox Street in Fitchburg) in or about 1967. Although the congregations were separately managed (retaining separate affiliations with the United Church of Christ and the United Methodist Church), they shared the facilities and the minister. The old Fox Street Methodist Church building was sold off (and was later demolished).

== Building sale and dissolution of Faith United ==
In 2013 a dwindling and aging membership of Faith United was experiencing difficulty in maintaining the property. The building was sold to Casa De Gracia y Restauración, or the House of Grace and Restoration. The three congregations continued to meet in the building until the Faith United members decided to disband in 2017. Faith United held its final worship service on June 24, 2018. As of August 2020 the building continues to be used by Casa De Gracia y Restauración.

== See also ==
- National Register of Historic Places listings in Worcester County, Massachusetts
