= Safety Fund National Bank =

- U.S. National Register of Historic Places
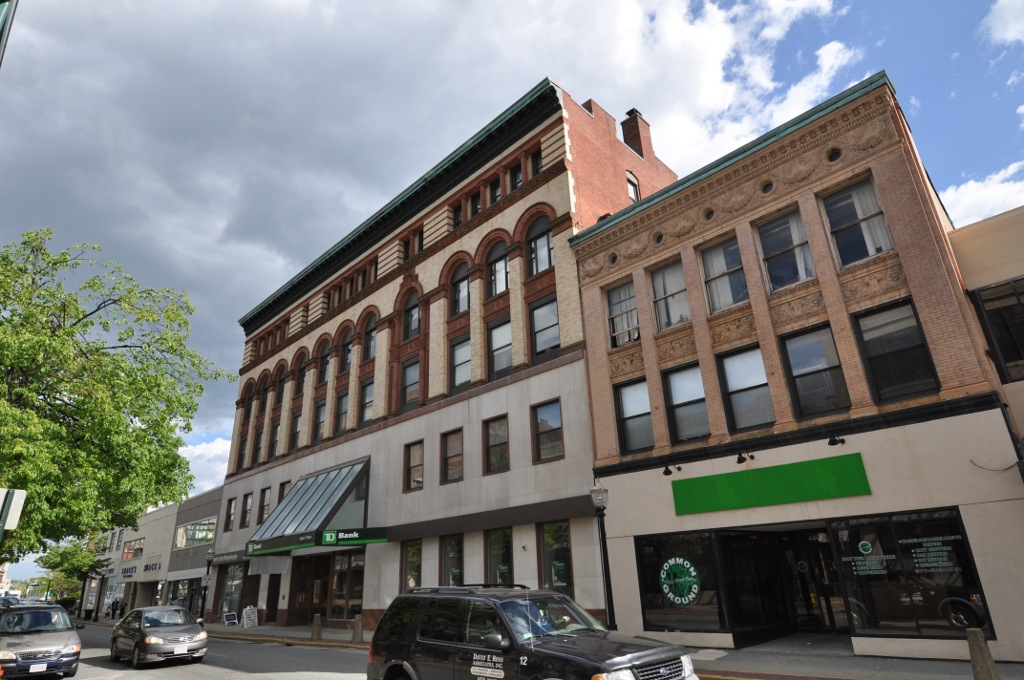

- Location within Massachusetts Location within the United States
- Location: 470 Main St., Fitchburg, Massachusetts
- Coordinates: 42°34′58″N 71°47′57″W
- Area: less than one acre
- Architect: Henry M. Francis; Thomas Marriott James
- Architectural style: Renaissance, Stripped Classical Modern
- MPS: Downtown Architecture of H.M. Francis, Fitchburg, MA
- NRHP reference No.: 09000252
- Added to NRHP: April 30, 2009

The Safety Fund National Bank is a historic bank building at 470 Main Street in Fitchburg, Massachusetts, United States. Completed in 1895, it is a prominent work of local architect H.M. Francis, and one of its only buildings to continuously house a bank since its construction. The building, now home to a TD Bank branch, was listed on the National Register of Historic Places in 2009.

== Description and history ==
The Safety Fund National Bank is located in downtown Fitchburg, on the south side of Main Street between Oliver and Prichard Streets. It is a five-story structure, with a steel frame originally clad in yellow brick with brownstone trim. Its bottom two floors have been refinished with granite facing and limestone trime, with a glass-covered projecting marquee at the main entrance. The upper levels retain Renaissance Revival styling, including rounded arches above the fourth-floor window bays. Original interior features include a bank vault in the bank offices on the ground floor.

The building was one of many Fitchburg commercial buildings designed by architect Henry M. Francis and was completed in 1895. It is the only one of three Francis-designed bank buildings to survive in the city. It underwent major remodelings in 1934 and 1963. The Safety Fund National Bank (which through mergers and acquisitions became part of BankBoston) was established in 1874, and this was its first permanent home. In 2000, it became part of TD Bank, which continues to operate a bank branch in the building. The upper levels have been converted into residential space.

== See also ==
- National Register of Historic Places listings in Worcester County, Massachusetts
