= Kimball Public Library =

- U.S. National Register of Historic Places
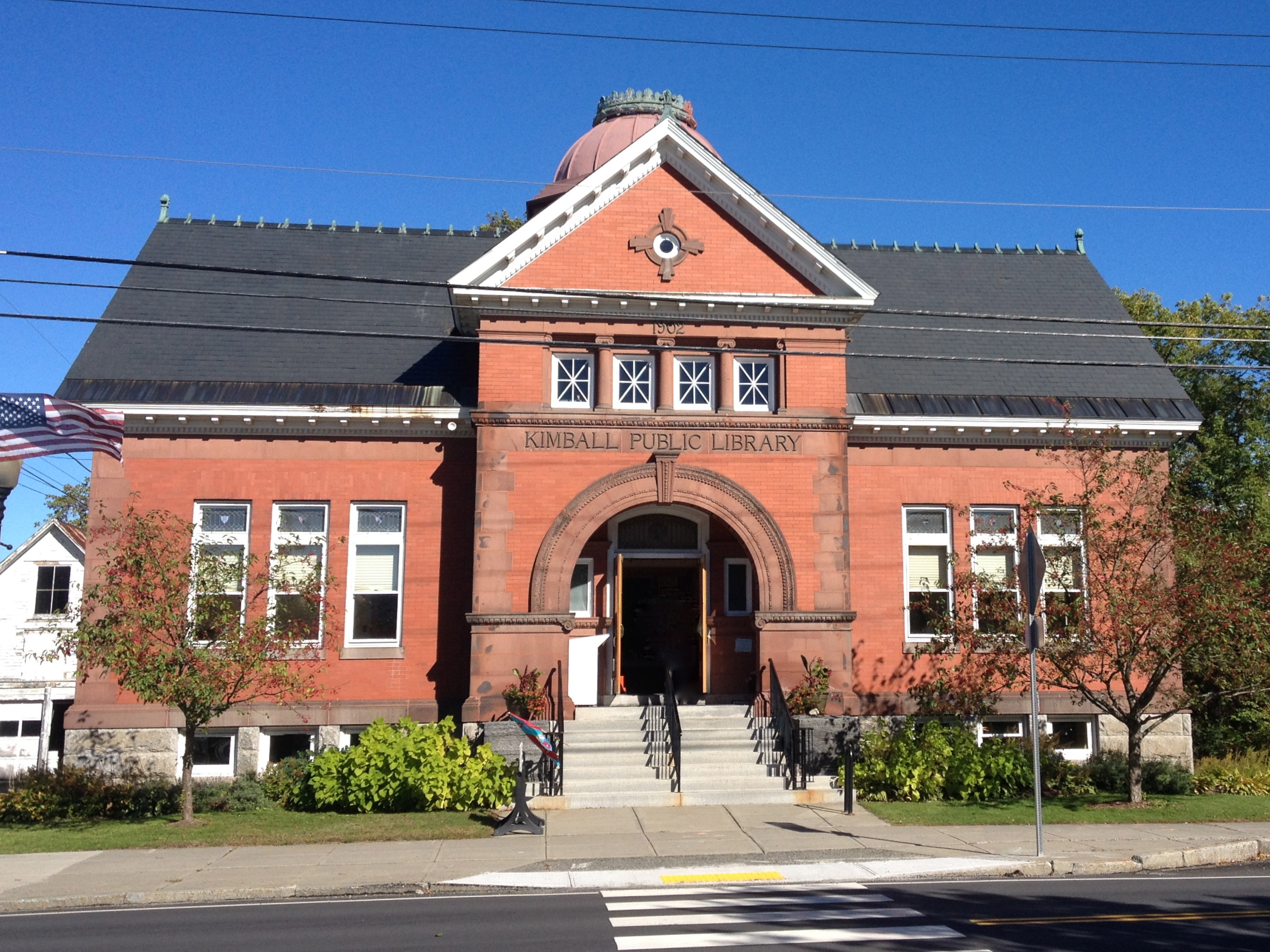

- Location within Vermont Location within the United States
- Location: 67 Main St., Randolph, Vermont
- Coordinates: 43°55′31″N 72°39′58″W
- Area: 0.6 acres (0.24 ha)
- Built: 1902
- Architect: Henry M. Francis & Sons
- NRHP reference No.: 85000568
- Added to NRHP: March 14, 1985

The Kimball Public Library is the public library serving Randolph, Vermont. It is located at 67 Main Street, just north of the town center, in an architecturally distinguished building donated by Col. Robert Kimball, a Randolph native. Built in 1902, it was listed on the National Register of Historic Places in 1985.

== Architecture and history ==
The Kimball Public Library stands north of Randolph's commercial downtown, on the east side of Main Street, next door to the Chandler Music Hall. It is a single-story masonry structure, set on a sloping lot that exposes a full basement to the rear. The foundation is rusticated granite, and the main structure is faced in brick with sandstone trim. The building is capped by gabled roof with a dome at its center. The main facade is symmetrical, with a tall projecting gabled section at the center, sheltering the main entrance under a large Romanesque rounded arch. This section is flanked on either side by banks of three sash windows, each topped by stained-glass transoms. The interior retains many original features, including woodwork, brickwork, marble wainscoting, terrazzo marble flooring, and moulded finish elements.

The construction of this building was funded by Colonel Robert Kimball, who was born and raised in Randolph, and found financial success as a banker in New York City. Kimball maintained a summer residence in the town, and, like many philanthropists of the period, recognized the need for the town to have a dedicated space for its library collection. He agreed to fund this building's construction, on land provided by the town. It was designed by Henry M. Francis & Sons of Fitchburg, Massachusetts, and was completed in 1902.

== See also ==
- National Register of Historic Places listings in Orange County, Vermont
