= Groton High School (Groton, Massachusetts) =

- U.S. National Register of Historic Places
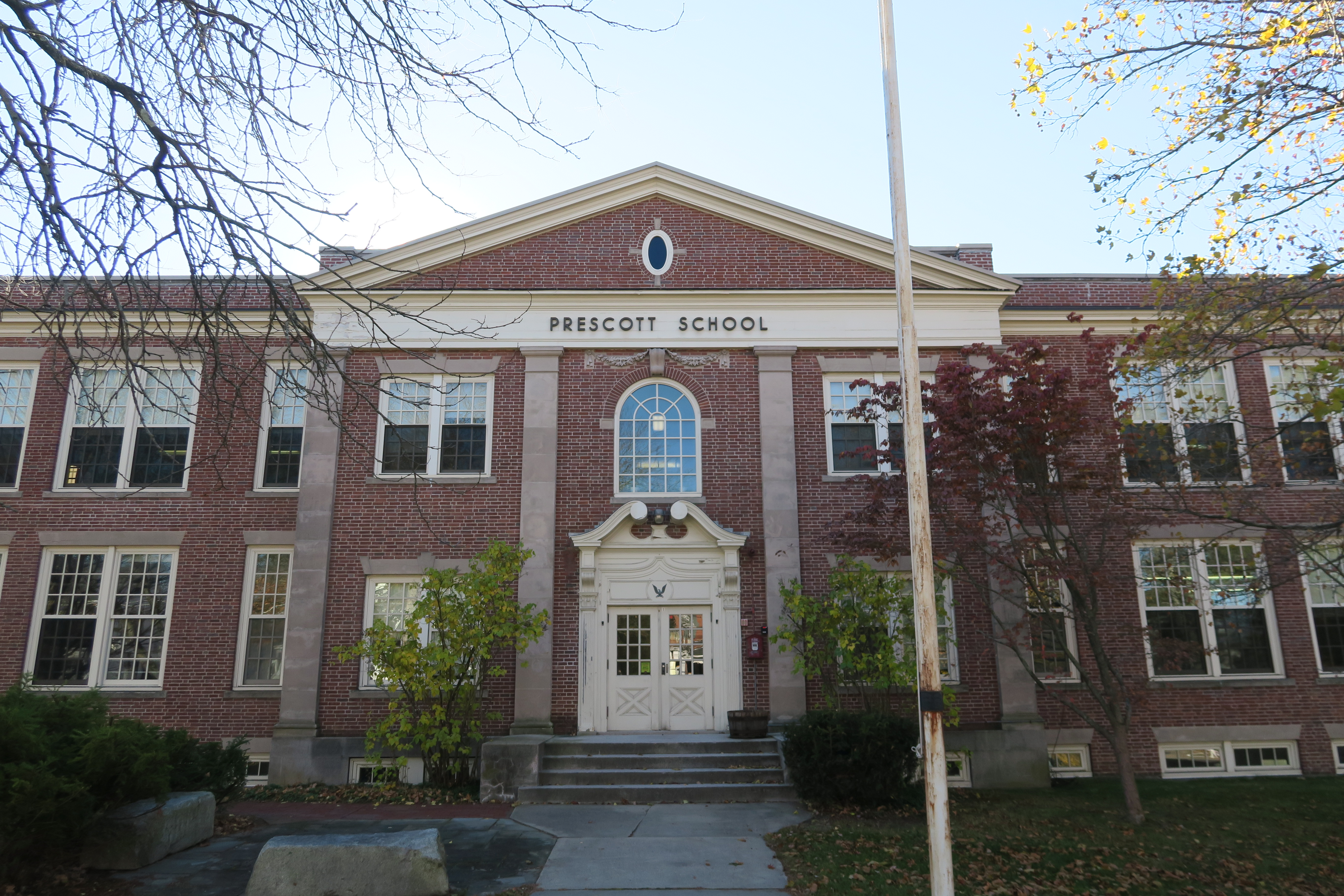

- Location within Massachusetts Location within the United States
- Location: 145 Main Street; Groton, Massachusetts
- Coordinates: 42°36′26″N 71°34′11″W
- Built: 1871; 1928
- Architectural style: Second Empire; Colonial Revival
- NRHP reference No.: 10000057
- Added to NRHP: March 2, 2010

The old Groton High School is a historic school building at 145 Main Street in Groton, Massachusetts. It has also variously been known as the Prescott School, Groton Junior High School, and Butler School. The building is two stories, with a flat roof. It is divided into four sections: a central portion that protrudes slightly from the main facade, which is topped by a pedimented gable, two wings that flank the central portion, and a rear section behind the central building. Because the building sits on a sloping lot, the rear section is actually three full stories; its ground floor section is made of concrete, while the rest of the building is predominantly made of brick, laid in a variation of an English cross bond pattern. The central portion was built in 1871 to a design by Henry M. Francis, originally with Second Empire styling, and named the Butler School in honor of a long-serving town clerk, Caleb Butler. The school served all grades until 1915.

In the late 1920s the building was extensively altered, adding the three wings, and removing the third floor of the original building, which had been damaged by fire in 1925. Exterior changes also gave the building its present Colonial Revival appearance. Despite significant alterations in use to accommodate different grades over the years, the building's interior also remained remarkably intact. In 1975, the town joined with neighboring Dunstable, and its high school students were relocated to the Groton-Dunstable Regional High School. This building was renamed the Colonel William Prescott School, and house lower grades until it was closed in 2008.

The building was listed on the National Register of Historic Places in 2010.

== See also ==
- National Register of Historic Places listings in Middlesex County, Massachusetts
