= Fitchburg Historical Society =

- U.S. National Register of Historic Places
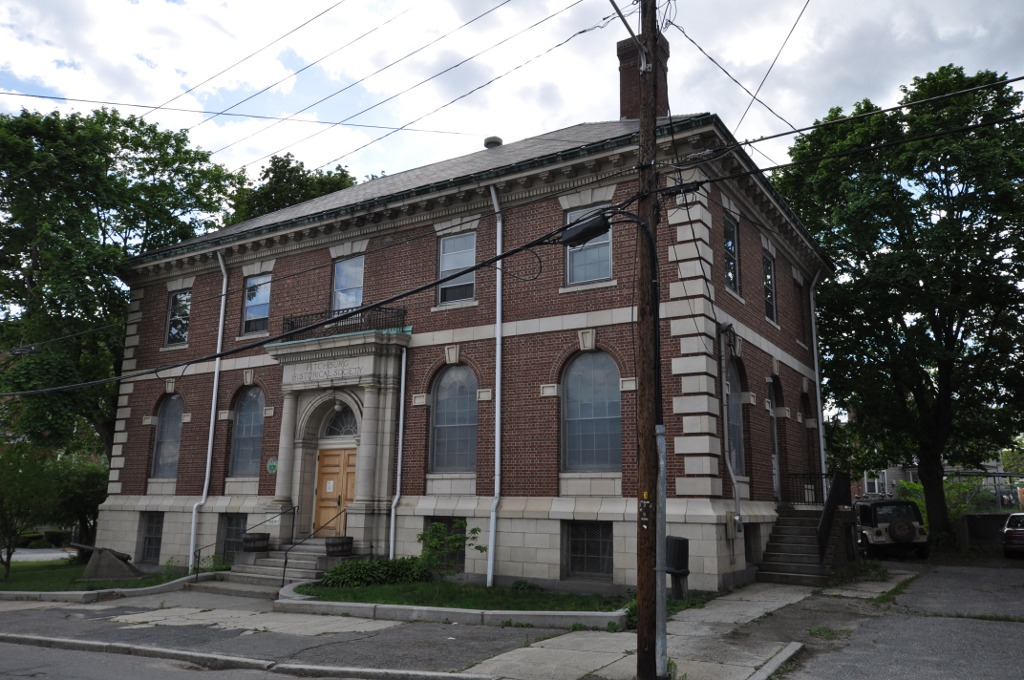
- The society's first building, now used for storage and archives

- Location within Massachusetts Location within the United States
- Location: 50 Grove St., Fitchburg, Massachusetts
- Coordinates: 42°35′04″N 71°48′10″W
- Area: less than one acre
- Architect: Francis, Henry M., & Sons
- Architectural style: Classical Revival
- NRHP reference No.: 03000992
- Added to NRHP: October 3, 2003

The Fitchburg Historical Society is a historical society whose mission is to collect, preserve, and present the history of Fitchburg, Massachusetts. The society was founded in 1892, and is now headquartered in the historic Phoenix Building at 781 Main Street. The society's original 1912 headquarters building, designed (like the Phoenix Building) by architect H. M. Francis, was listed on the National Register of Historic Places in 2003. The society operates three days a week and is open from 10am to 4pm Mondays and Tuesdays with a longer day on Wednesday from 10am to 6pm. They offer genealogical research, a library of local history, and numerous volunteer opportunities.

== Original building architecture ==
The society's 1912 headquarters is located on the west side of Grove Street, separate from its junction with Elm Street by a society-owned triangular pocket park. The building is a two-story masonry structure, built out of red brick, with terra cotta trim and a slate hip roof. It is five bays wide and three deep, with ground-floor windows set in round-arch openings capped by terra cotta keystones. The building corners are quoined, and the roof line is adorned with modillions and dentil moulding. The main entrance, located at the center of the Grove Street facade, has an elaborate surround, with engaged columns rising to an entablature and shallow balcony with iron railing.

The building was constructed in 1912 to a design by Henry Francis, at the time one of Fitchburg's leading architects. The building is one of the city's finest examples of Georgian Revival architecture, and has been relatively little-altered during the society's ownership. The principal alterations include the addition of storm windows, air conditioning, and the adaption of the attic space for additional storage.

== See also ==
- National Register of Historic Places listings in Worcester County, Massachusetts
- List of historical societies in Massachusetts
