= Goffstown Public Library =

- U.S. National Register of Historic Places
- U.S. Historic district – Contributing property
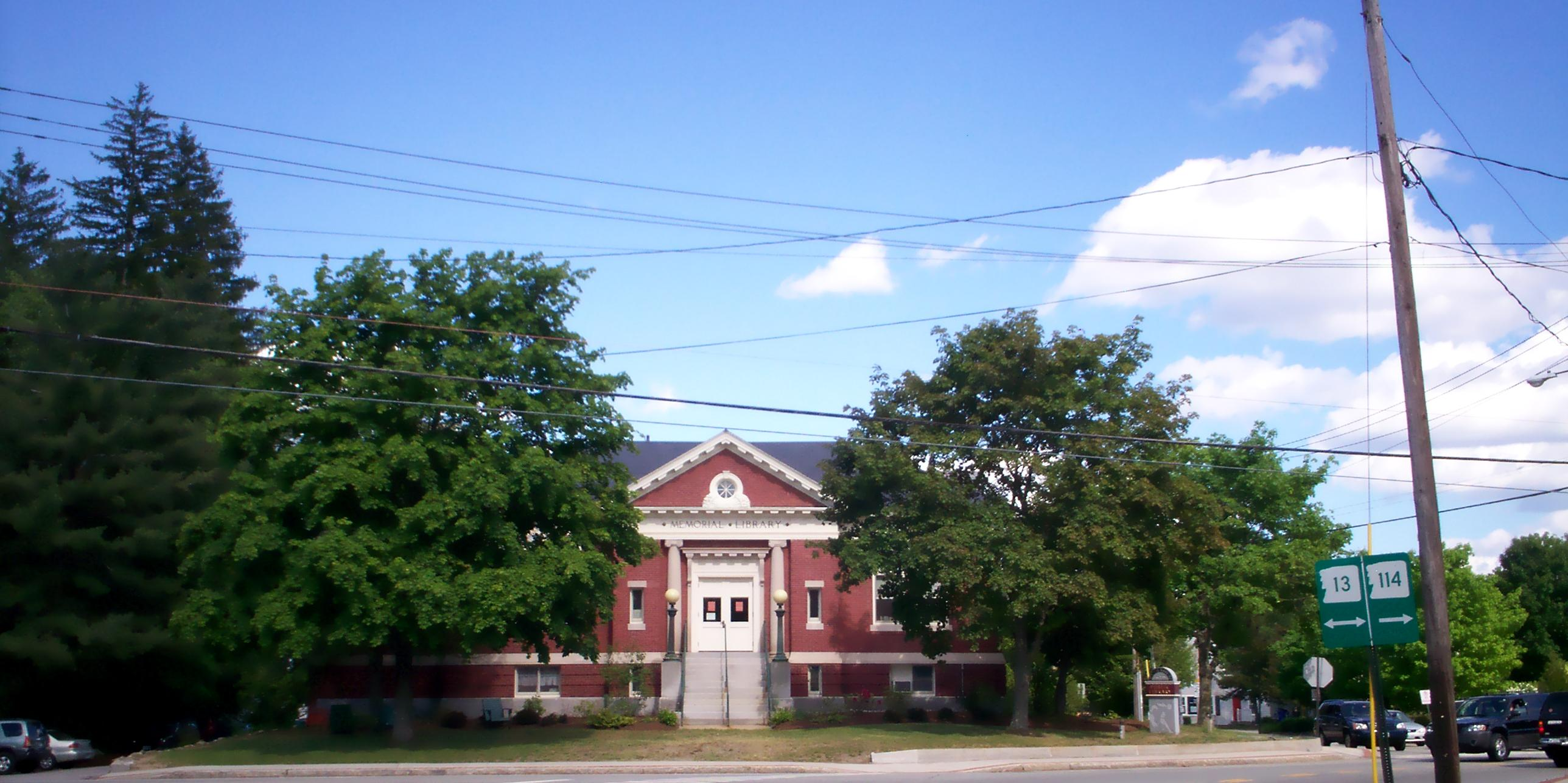

- Location within New Hampshire Location within the United States
- Location: 2 High St., Goffstown, New Hampshire
- Coordinates: 43°1′14″N 71°36′1″W
- Area: 0.3 acres (0.12 ha)
- Built: 1909
- Architect: Francis, H.M. & Sons
- Architectural style: Classical Revival
- Part of: Goffstown Main Street Historic District (ID07000153)
- NRHP reference No.: 95001426

Significant dates
- Added to NRHP: December 7, 1995
- Designated CP: March 15, 2007

The Goffstown Public Library is located at 2 High Street in Goffstown, New Hampshire. The building it occupies was designed by architects Henry M. Francis & Sons and was built in 1909. It is small Classical Revival building built of brick with stone trim, and was added to the National Register of Historic Places in 1995. It is one of the finest examples of Classical Revival architecture in the town, with a three-bay main facade whose central entrance projects slightly, and is topped by a pediment supported by Ionic columns.

== Architecture and history ==
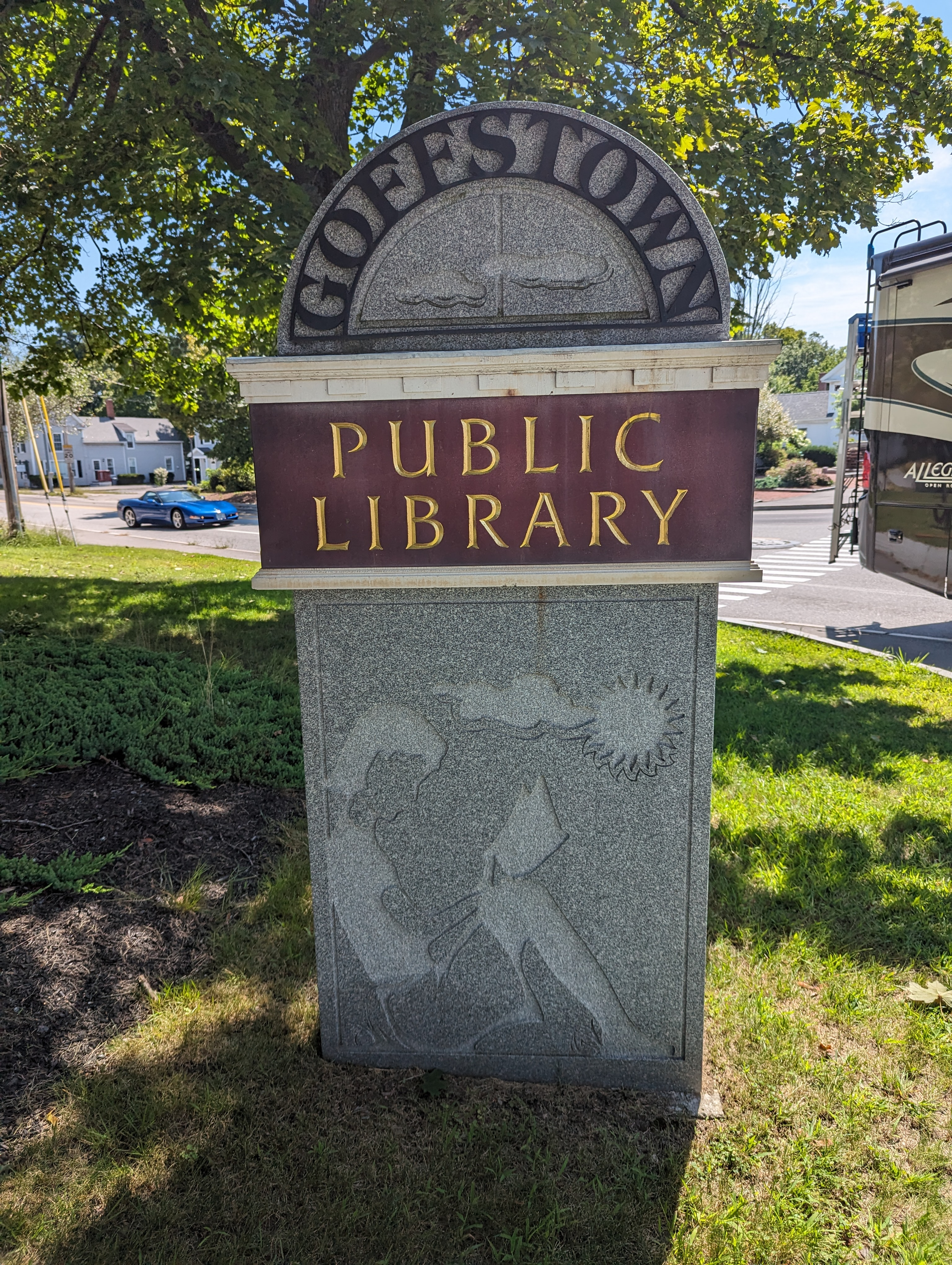
Granite sign on the library's lawn

The Goffstown Public Library occupies a prominent position in the center of Goffstown village, at the northeast corner of Elm and High Streets. Oriented facing west, it is a single-story brick building, covered with a slate hip roof and set on a granite foundation. It has a raised basement, separated from the main floor by a stone string course. The building facade was originally symmetrical, having had a sympathetic addition made to the northern end. An entablature encircles the building below the roof line, which is studded with modillion blocks. The main entrance is in a projecting section, capped by a pedimented gable. The entry is set in a recess, flanked by round columns in antis, and framed by pilasters and a projecting cornice.

Goffstown's library was founded in 1888 with the donation of 150 volumes by Miss Lucy Rogers. The library was originally housed in Goffstown's town hall (a building that no longer stands), until 1907, when construction was begun on this building. The architect was Henry M. Francis of Fitchburg, Massachusetts, who also designed small libraries for Rindge and Jaffrey. The building was formally dedicated in October 1909, and has served as the town's main library since.

== See also ==
- National Register of Historic Places listings in Hillsborough County, New Hampshire
