= Goffstown Congregational Church =

Historic church in New Hampshire, United States

- U.S. National Register of Historic Places
- U.S. Historic district – Contributing property
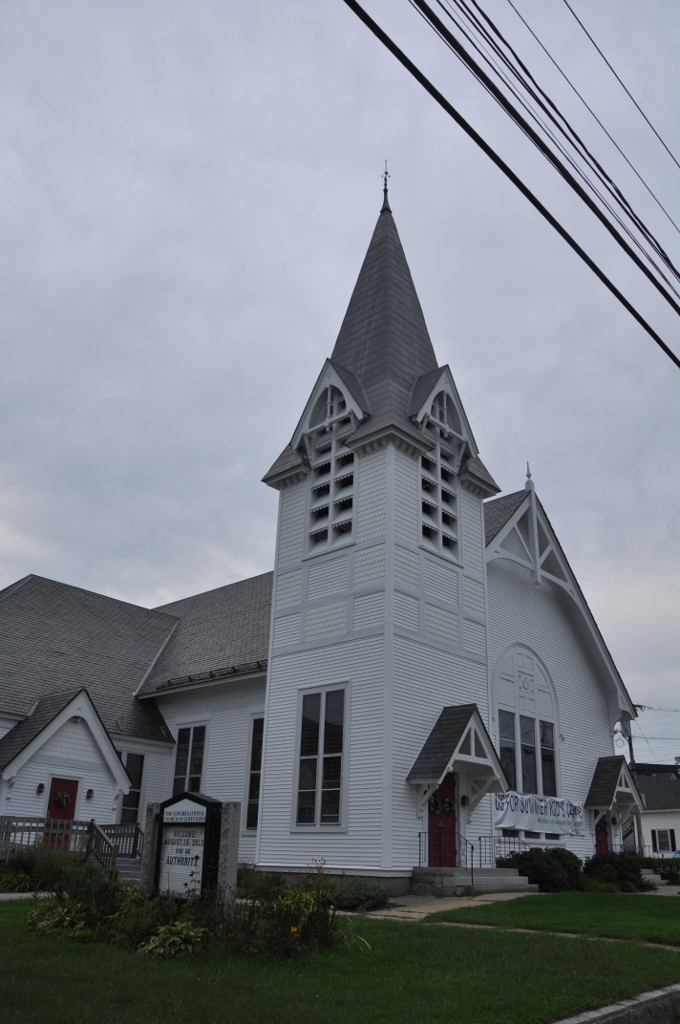

- Location within New Hampshire Location within the United States
- Location: 10 Main St., Goffstown, New Hampshire
- Coordinates: 43°1′10″N 71°36′3″W
- Area: less than one acre
- Built: 1845; 1890
- Built by: William U. Carlton (1890)
- Architect: William M. Butterfield (1890)
- Architectural style: Queen Anne
- Part of: Goffstown Main Street Historic District (ID07000153)
- NRHP reference No.: 96000193

Significant dates
- Added to NRHP: March 1, 1996
- Designated CP: March 15, 2007

The Congregational Church of Goffstown (or Goffstown Congregational Church) is a historic Congregational church building in the center of Goffstown, New Hampshire, United States. It is a member of the Conservative Congregational Christian Conference (CCCC).

The congregation was established in 1768, and now meets in its fourth meetinghouse. This wood-frame building, whose oldest portions probably date to 1845, was extensively restyled as a Queen Anne Victorian around 1890 to a design by Manchester architect William M. Butterfield. The building was listed on the National Register of Historic Places in 1996.

== Architecture and building history ==
The Goffstown Congregational Church is located in the village center of Goffstown, at the southwest corner of Main and Church Streets. The church is a single-story wood-frame structure, with a gabled roof and an exterior finished in wooden clapboards and decorative wooden shingles. It presents a gabled facade to Main Street, with a tower on the left side, rising two stories to a gabled roof with dormers and a steeple. Entrances are found in the base of the tower, and at the right side of the main block, sheltered by hoods with Stick style woodwork. A third entrance is set in the parish hall, which extends to the left at the back of the main sanctuary.

The congregation was founded in 1768, and first met in a meeting house in the village of Grasmere. Its second meeting house was built in 1816, and was located on South Mast Street. The present building's construction history begins in 1845, when a Greek Revival structure was built. It was enlarged in 1869, and in 1882 the gallery was removed and new windows installed. In 1890, the congregation retained Manchester architect William M. Butterfield to significantly redesign the building, resulting in its present appearance. The contractor was William U. Carlton. Few traces remain of its previous Greek Revival appearance, and only minor changes have been made since then to its exterior.

== See also ==
- National Register of Historic Places listings in Hillsborough County, New Hampshire
