= Ashburnham Center Historic District =

Historic district in Massachusetts, United States

- U.S. National Register of Historic Places
- U.S. Historic district
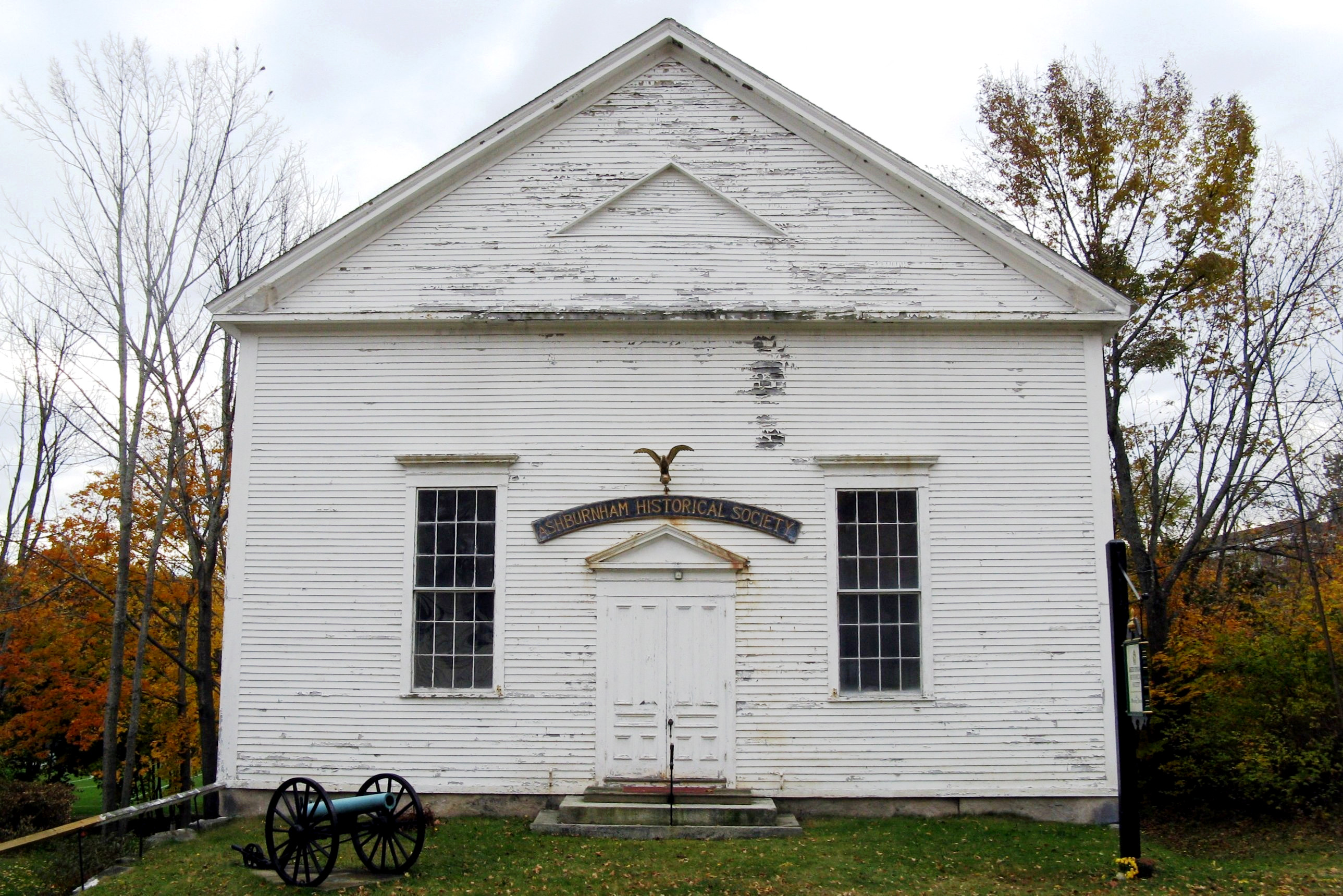
- The Meeting House, Ashburnham Historical Society

- Location within Massachusetts Location within the United States
- Location: Along and near Main and Ashby Streets, Ashburnham, Massachusetts
- Coordinates: 42.6357°N 71.9092°W
- Area: 215 acres (87 ha)
- NRHP reference No.: 99000050
- Added to NRHP: January 27, 1999

The Ashburnham Center Historic District is a historic district encompassing the core of the village center of Ashburnham, Massachusetts in the United States. It is a well-preserved industrial village that experienced its most significant period of growth in the mid-19th century. The district was added to the National Register of Historic Places in 1999.

== Description and history ==
Ashburnham was first settled in 1739, but was abandoned due to the danger of Native American attacks in the 1740s, and was not permanently settled until 1753. The town was incorporated in 1765, and achieved its present boundaries in 1824. The original town center was located atop a hill north of the present town center, where its first meeting house was built. Its economic and civic focus shifted south, to the area between two branches of Phillips Brook, both of which were dammed for industrial purposes in the late 18th century. Development was only modest until the industrial period of 1830–1855, when industrial development along Phillips Brook spurred significant growth. The old meeting house was abandoned for a new Congregational church (1834) on Main Street (the timbers of the old meeting house were used to build a town house, which still stands at 79 Main Street). The economic activity resulted in the construction of a significant number of Greek Revival houses, many of which survive in some form. In the second half of the 19th century, residential growth was modest. Still, a number of notable civic buildings were built, including a Methodist (later Roman Catholic) church in 1870, the Stevens Library (1890), and a new Town Hall (1904).

The historic district is a roughly triangular area 215 acres (87 ha) in size, defined by Main Street (Massachusetts Route 12) on the south, Proctor Street on the east, and Chapel Street on the northwest. It extends as far south as Academy Street, and beyond the main roads for short distances. There are now only vestiges of the village's industrial 19th-century history; most of the 189 historically significant buildings are either residential or civic in nature. Most of the commercial buildings in the district are found on Main Street, and include a number of examples of early 19th-century commercial architecture.

== See also ==
- National Register of Historic Places listings in Worcester County, Massachusetts
