= Northbridge High School =

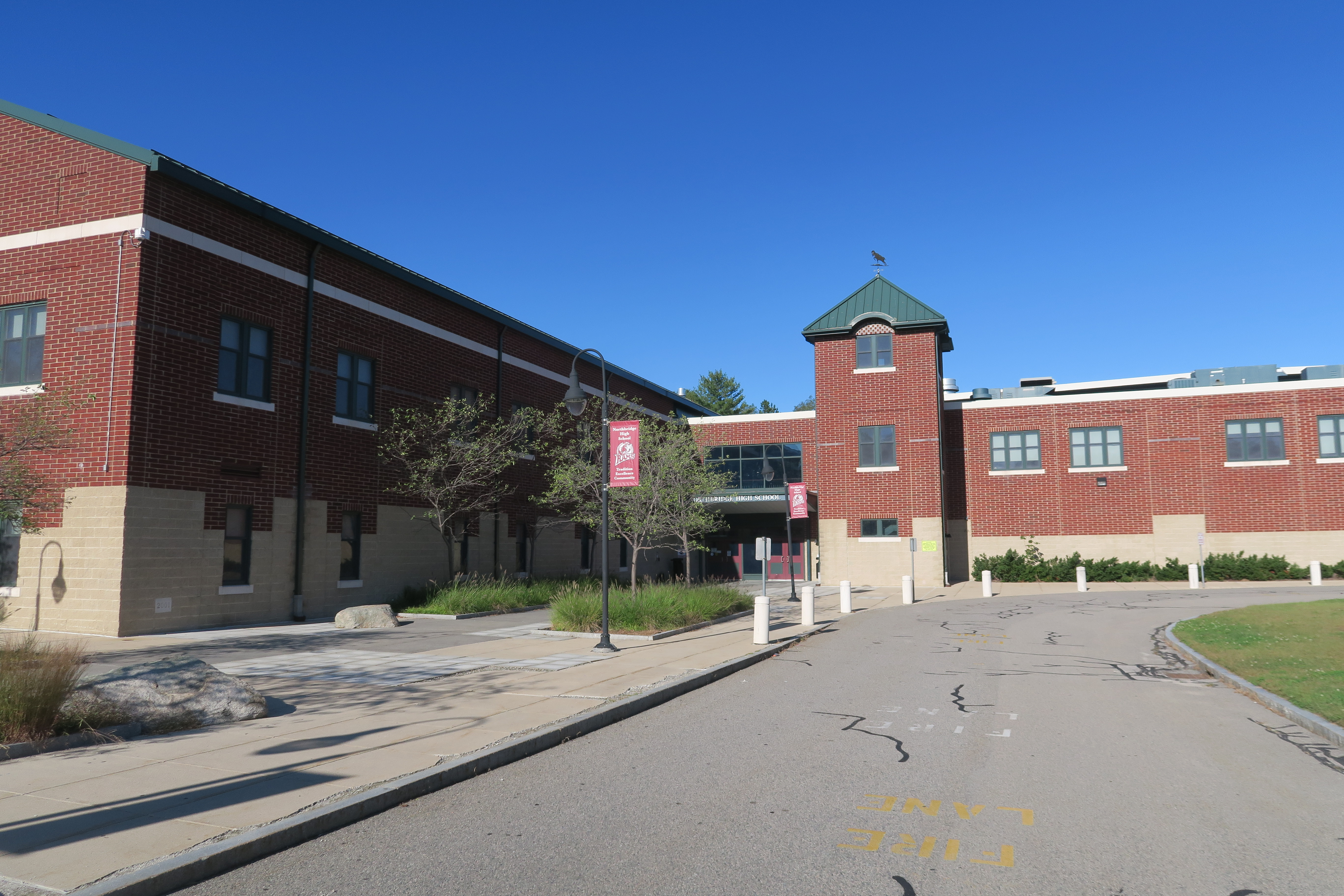
- View of Northbridge High School in 2017.

Location
- 427 Linwood Avenue; Whitinsville, Massachusetts 01588; United States; 42°6′33″N 71°39′28″W

Information
- Type: Public high school
- Established: 1866
- School district: Northbridge Public Schools
- Principal: Scott Connery
- Grades: 9–12
- Enrollment: 473 (2023–2024)
  - Grade 9: 125
  - Grade 10: 135
  - Grade 11: 102
  - Grade 12: 111
- Colors: Maroon and white
- Athletics conference: Central Massachusetts Athletic Conference
- Nickname: Rams
- Rival: Uxbridge High School
- Website: www.algonquinpto.com

Northbridge High School is a public high school in Northbridge, Massachusetts. The school is operated by the Northbridge Public Schools.

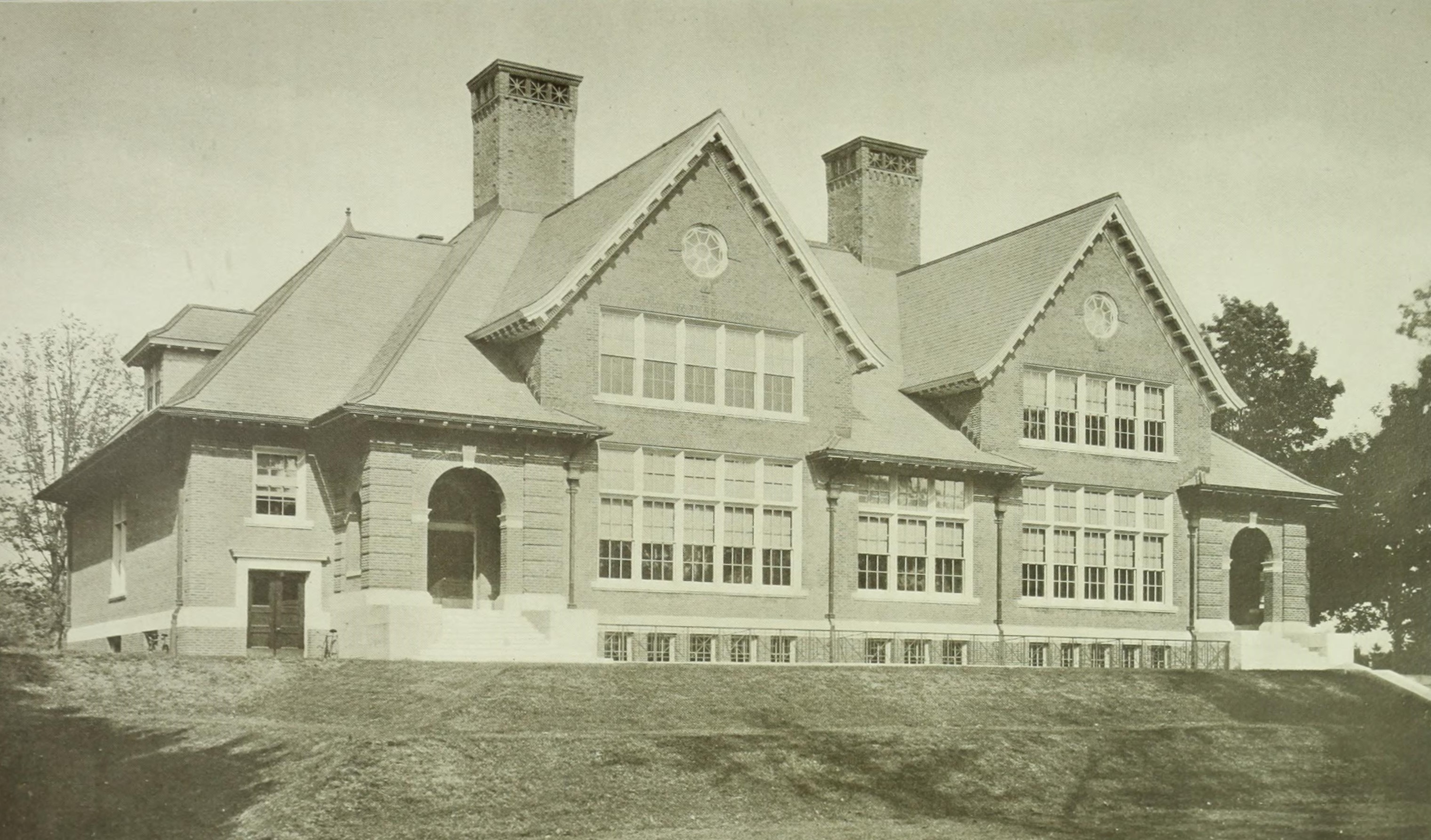
Old high school building at 171 Linwood Ave.

== History ==
Northbridge High School was established in 1866. Originally, the school was located on Church Street. In 1890, Northbridge High moved to the corner of Cottage and Hill Streets. In 1906, a larger school building was constructed by Peabody & Stearns at 171 Linwood Avenue (now part of Northbridge Middle School). Currently, the school is located at 427 Linwood Avenue.

== Athletics ==
Home of the Rams, Northbridge High athletic teams sport the colors of maroon and white. The school uses the New England Sports Center in Marlborough as a venue.

Northbridge High is a member of the Central Massachusetts Athletic Conference.

== Athletic state championships ==
Northbridge athletics is most known for their football success. With a total of 11 state championships in football, Northbridge is tied for the 4th most football state championships in Massachusetts. The football team's success can be largely attributed to their coach, Ken LaChapelle, who has been a key figure in the sustained success of the Rams throughout his coaching tenure. LaChapelle has been coaching the team for 50 years and has led the team to over 400 wins, being the first football coach to do so in Massachusetts.

Sport	Year(s)
MIAA sanctioned sports
Football (11)	1974, 1987, 1989, 1997, 1998, 2001, 2002, 2007, 2010, 2011, 2015
Baseball (2)	1999, 2010
Boys' ice hockey (1)	2019
Other sports
E-sports (Super Smash Bros. Ultimate) (2)	2021, 2022

== Notable alumni ==
- Alice Burke, politician
- Lincoln P. Cole, politician
- Steven Dorian (1996), singer
- John Kizirian, United States Armed Forces officer
- Phil Vandersea (1961), professional football player

== See also ==
- List of high schools in Massachusetts
