= United States Post Office–Whitinsville Main =

- US Post Office–Whitinsville Main
- U.S. National Register of Historic Places
- U.S. Historic district – Contributing property
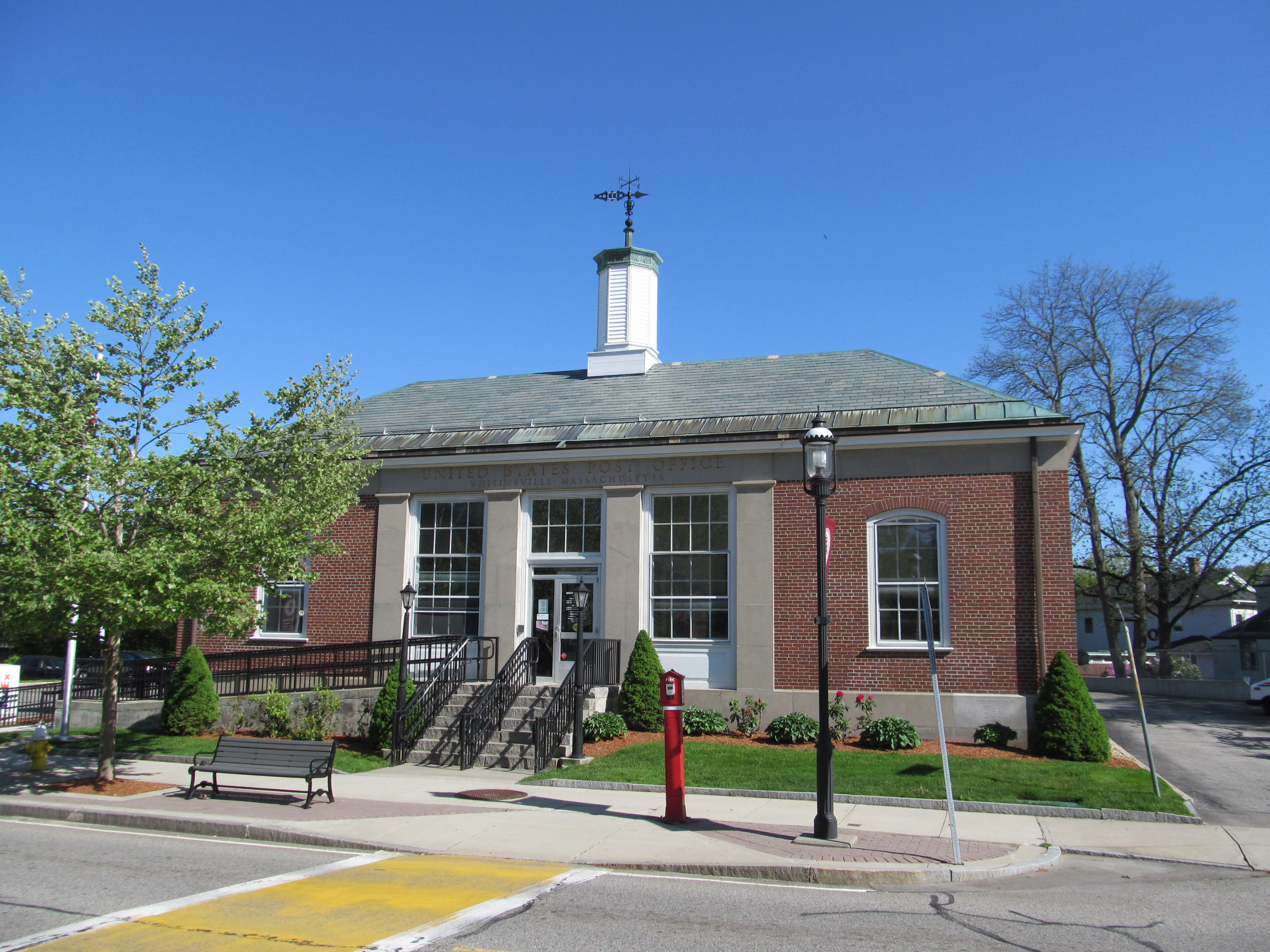

- Location within Massachusetts Location within the United States
- Interactive map showing the location of the U.S. Post Office-Whitinsville Main
- Location: Northbridge, Massachusetts
- Coordinates: 42°6′38″N 71°39′47″W
- Built: 1937
- Architect: Simon, Louis A.; Blauner Construction Co.
- Architectural style: Colonial Revival
- Part of: Whitinsville Historic District (ID83000613)
- NRHP reference No.: 86003433

Significant dates
- Added to NRHP: October 15, 1987
- Designated CP: April 7, 1983

The US Post Office—Whitinsville Main is an historic post office building located at 58 Church Street in the village of Whitinsville in the town of Northbridge, Massachusetts. It is a single-story Colonial Revival masonry building, built of brick and cast stone and capped by a hip roof. It was built in 1938, and is distinguished for the massive pilasters that flank the central entrance, and for its cupola.

The building was listed on the National Register of Historic Places in 1987, and was included in the Whitinsville Historic District in 1983.

== See also ==
- National Register of Historic Places listings in Worcester County, Massachusetts
- List of United States post offices
