= St. Camillus Health Center =

Coordinates: 42.1216°N 71.6716°W

St. Camillus Health Center, a skilled nursing facility located in Whitinsville, Massachusetts, United States, was formerly known as St. Camillus Hospital for Incurable Diseases.

== Services provided ==
Today St. Camillus Health Center provides occupational, physical and speech rehabilitation; skilled nursing care and short term care as well as long term care.

== History ==
St. Camillus Hospital was built in the 1960s by the Brothers of the Order of St. Camillus, the "Servants of the Sick," to serve those suffering from multiple sclerosis and other incurable diseases. In the late 1980s the Order converted the hospital into a nursing home and renamed it "St. Camillus Health Center." In 2002 it was sold to a local non-profit group which now operates it.

== Location ==
St. Camillus is located at 447 Hill Street on what was known as the E. Kent Swift estate. The hospital was built on the front part of the property and the 22-room brick Georgian mansion located further back on the property was used by the brothers as a monastery.

=== History of the mansion and estate ===
The mansion was built in 1911 by George Marston Whitin as a wedding gift for his daughter, Katherine Leland Whitin and her husband, Elijah Kent Swift. George Marston Whitin married his cousin, Catherine Whitin Lasell, the granddaughter of John Crane Whitin, the founder of the Whitin Machine Works, the village's largest employer, and son of the founder of Whitinsville. George Marston Whitin, or Marston Whitin as he was called, became head of the machine works (or "The Shop, as it was called) and was succeeded by his son-in-law, E. Kent Swift.

=== Present use of the mansion ===
The mansion is now called the Father Turci Manor, in honor of Vitaliano Turci, administrator of St. Camillus from 1966 to 1983. In 1999, it was restored to its former glory.
