= Phil Vandersea =

American football player (1943–2026)

No. 37, 38, 83, 46
- Positions: Linebacker, defensive end

Personal information
- Born: February 25, 1943; Whitinsville, Massachusetts, U.S.
- Died: October 24, 2026 (aged 83); Shrewsbury, Massachusetts, U.S.
- Listed height: 6 ft 3 in (1.91 m)
- Listed weight: 245 lb (111 kg)

Career information
- High school: Northbridge (Whitinsville)
- College: Massachusetts (1962–1965)
- NFL draft: 1965: 16th round, 220th overall pick
- AFL draft: 1965: Red Shirt 9th round, 66th overall pick

Career history
- Green Bay Packers (1966); New Orleans Saints (1967); Green Bay Packers (1968–1969); Montreal Alouettes (1972)

Awards and highlights
- Super Bowl champion (1966); NFL champion (1966)

Career NFL statistics
- Return yards: 71
- Stats at Pro Football Reference

Phillip John Vandersea (February 25, 1943 – October 24, 2026) was an American professional football player who was a linebacker and defensive end for four seasons in the National Football League (NFL). He played college football for the UMass Minutemen. He also played one season professionally in the Canadian Football League (CFL).

== Early life ==
Born in Whitinsville, Massachusetts, Vandersea attended Northbridge High School, where in addition to football, he played baseball and basketball. In 1973, he was inducted into the school's athletic hall of fame.

== College career ==
Vandersea played college football for the University of Massachusetts Amherst Minutemen. At UMass, Vandersea played on defense and punted, but excelled at fullback. In 1963, he helped lead the Minutemen to an 8-0-1 record and as a senior in 1965, he was the team's second leading rusher with 388 yards and finished third in scoring with six touchdowns and selected to the All-Yankee Conference team.

In 1982, Vandersea was selected as the starting fullback on the UMass All-Time Team in honor of the program's 100th anniversary. He was inducted into the UMass Athletics Hall of Fame in 2012.

== Professional career ==
Vandersea was selected by the Green Bay Packers in the 16th round (220th overall) of the 1965 NFL draft and was part of the Super Bowl-winning team his rookie season in 1966. He was claimed by the New Orleans Saints in 1967 NFL expansion draft, but returned to the Packers for the 1968 and 1969 seasons. Vandersea finished his professional in the Canadian Football League with the Montreal Alouettes in 1972.

== Personal life and death ==
Following his playing career, Vandersea worked as an assistant football coach at the College of the Holy Cross for four seasons from 1975 to 1978. Vandersea then worked for 20 years for the Massachusetts Department of Corrections as a case worker, counselor, parole board liaison, and community release supervisor.

Vandersea died on October 24, 2026, at the age of 83. Vandersea was married to his high school sweetheart, Sandra, for 59 years.
