= John Kizirian =

American colonel (1928–2006)

- Born: April 4, 1928; Whitinsville, Massachusetts
- Died: February 26, 2006 (aged 77); Melbourne, Florida
- Burial place: Arlington National Cemetery, Arlington, Virginia
- Military career
- Allegiance: United States of America
- Branch: United States Army; United States Navy
- Service years: USN 1945 – 1949; USA 1949 – 1975; USA 1980 – 1984
- Rank: Colonel
- Service number: 0-91916
- Conflicts: World War II; Korean War; Vietnam War
- Awards: Distinguished Service Cross; Defense Distinguished Service; Silver Star; Legion of Merit (4); Distinguished Flying Cross; Soldier's Medal; Bronze Star w/ V device (6); Purple Heart (3); Air Medal (14)

John Kizirian (Armenian: Ժան Գիզիրեան) (April 2, 1928 - February 26, 2006) was a highly decorated member of the United States Armed Forces for over three decades and served during World War II, the Korean War, and the Vietnam War.

Kizirian enlisted in the United States Navy near the end of World War II at the age of 17. In 1949, he applied for a transfer to the Army and became a sergeant. During the Korean War, he fought in the infantry in numerous front line battles, becoming a lieutenant and platoon leader. By the Vietnam War, Kizirian was an intelligence officer who frequently led troops in special combat missions. After 30 years of service, Kizirian retired from the military as a colonel in 1975, but returned to duty again to serve as the U.S. Defense Representative in Indonesia from 1980 to 1984. Believed to be one of the most decorated Armenian-Americans ever to serve, Kizirian earned the Distinguished Service Cross, Defense Distinguished Service Medal, Silver Star, Legion of Merit (4 awards), Distinguished Flying Cross, Soldier's Medal, Bronze Star with V Device (6 awards), the Purple Heart (3 awards), and the Air Medal (14 awards). With a total of sixty-six decorations and awards, Kizirian is regarded as the most highly decorated Army Intelligence officer in United States history.

One of Kizirian's greatest achievements was his uncovering of the Tet Offensive after studying more than 400 intelligence reports and briefing General Creighton Abrams. According to his obituary, "The warning very likely saved thousands of American and South Vietnamese lives. Like his work in uncovering the Tet Offensive, most of his accomplishments and successes took place behind the scenes."

== Early life ==
Of Armenian descent, John Kizirian was born in Whitinsville, Massachusetts on April 4, 1928, to a family of Armenian immigrants. His mother Maritza and father Serop were born in Kharpert, Ottoman Empire. Kizirian's father, through a sponsorship by his uncle Garabed Kizirboghosian (Kizirboghosian would later be changed to Kizirian) who already lived in Whitinsville, Massachusetts, arrived in the United States in 1914. Kizirian's mother, along with her family emigrated to Cuba in order to seek an opportunity to move to the United States. By an arrangement, Kizirian's father, who was already a U.S. citizen, went to Cuba in 1927, met Kizirian's mother, married her and brought her to Whitinsville. Prior to the marriage, Kizirian's father was a baker, but after the marriage, he went to work for the Whitin Machine Works as a laborer where he worked for 45 years. Kizirian's mother was a housewife. He had two sisters, Margaret and Ani.

John Kizirian grew up on 34 Willow Street in Whitinsville and attended the local Northbridge High School. At an early age, Kizirian worked at a nearby floral shop as a panel setter. In his junior year of high school, Kizirian was on the student council and on February 3, 1944, became Northbridge's first Eagle Scout. However, his high school education was cut short when Kizirian quit school and joined military service.

== Military service ==
=== Active duty ===
John Kizirian joined the United States Navy on May 3, 1945, and was sent to Sampson Air Force Base, New York for boot camp. From there he was sent to San Diego, California to learn to be a pharmacist mate. While he was acquiring his education, World War II ended. He was then sent to a naval hospital in Virginia, then to a medical technology school in Cambridge, Maryland, Maryland where he became a lab technician.

Kizirian spent his third year in the navy on the USS Fargo (CL-106), a light cruiser which was part of the Atlantic Fleet. He was then assigned to Roosevelt Roads Naval Station in Puerto Rico. He spent approximately a year in Puerto Rico and was discharged on April 3, 1949.

After serving the navy, Kizirian returned to Whitinsville and remained in the reserves. He worked in the stock room of the Whitin Machine Works. Kizirian desired to return to the military and went to a local navy recruiter. The navy recruiter stated that they can only accept him as a hospital apprentice which Kizirian subsequently refused. He then applied to the Army and got accepted as a sergeant in 1949.

Kizirian was sent to Fort Dix in New Jersey for training and from there he was sent to Fort Benning, Georgia where he was assigned to the hospital in the laboratory. He was assigned to the laboratory as a non-commissioned officer and was in charge of the laboratory for approximately a year until the Korean War started.

=== Korean War ===
John Kizirian was initially sent to Japan as a Medical Corps and stationed at the Eighth Army headquarters. Kizirian, who wanted to be an infantryman, was assigned to the Seventh Infantry Division. Kizirian was ultimately assigned to the 1st Battalion of the 32nd Infantry Division and sent to the front in May 1951. Though Kizirian was still a sergeant, he was given a platoon of 40 troops under the command of A Company. The first task was to take a nearby hill which resulted in a successful removal of enemy troops guarding their positions.

In August 1951, Kizirian was then given the task to neutralize enemy forces in the vicinity of Hill 440 just south of Seoul. The entire battalion attacked and each of the companies were assigned to take a part of the hill. Kizirian's company took the center of the hill while the other companies were forced to withdraw. By nightfall, Kizirian's company was 5000 yards ahead of the Allied position of the Main Line of Resistance. Kizirian and his unit successfully took the vacated positions of the enemy. On August 27, a Chinese regiment numbering in the thousand's wanted to take back the position and attacked Kizirian's unit of 150 soldiers. During the assault, Kizirian killed a Chinese soldier with his carbine who nearly threw a grenade at him. However, Kizirian was shot in his abdomen and five of his soldiers were killed. Kizirian was carried to a nearby field where he was transferred onto a Jeep and taken to a nearby medical facility. Kizirian, who was reported injured on September 24, was transferred to a field hospital, then to a hospital in Pusan and ultimately airlifted to a convalescent hospital in Japan.

It was barely daylight and I walked over to where they had him and I said, "Okay, I'll take him to the rear" and pulled out my '45. "Let me take him. Did you guys search him?" And, about that time this guy pulled a grenade out, threw it and killed a couple of my people, so I shot him to death. As soon as he did it, I was shooting, but it was too late. I was furious, of course, about that.

— John Kizirian

After making a recovery, Kizirian was sent back to Pusan and rejoined the front. He was made platoon commander of B Company. The B Company participated in the battle of Hill 1243 where it was up against mortar fire from enemy positions. Kizirian was shot in the back while saving a soldier who was injured and laid out in the open. Kizirian was taken to a medical aid station and upon hearing that the platoon was under attack, Kizirian returned to the front. He arrived at a time when the troops captured a Korean prisoner who was part of the attack. When the prisoner threw a grenade and killed a couple of soldiers, Kizirian killed him. Kizirian became the commander of the company after the initial commander committed suicide. After he became a commander for a month, a new commander reinstated, and Kizirian left the front because it was his due-time. Upon leaving, he was awarded the Army Commendation Medal.

==== Post-Korea ====
When Kizirian returned from Korea, he was sent to Special Forces headquarters in Fort Bragg, North Carolina. From there, he was sent to Fort Benning, Georgia to advanced infantry school and then back to Fort Bragg where he became Special Forces team leader. Kizirian became the adjutant of the Special Welfare Center while receiving an education at the University of North Carolina and received his degree from there in 1957.

=== Vietnam War ===
When the Vietnam War started, Kizirian was assigned as a senior intelligence advisor to the Vietnamese III Corps until 1968, when he became part of the III Corps Military Intelligence Detachment and senior division of the Reconnaissance Unit until the summer of that year.

Throughout his time in Vietnam, Kizirian worked closely with General William Westmoreland who was the commander of the Military Assistance Command Vietnam (MACV). As a result of the missions that Kizirian took command of, he was awarded two Purple Hearts and a Distinguished Service Cross.

He was then appointed as part of the Army Intelligence, G2, 1st Air Cavalry Division where he served as an assistant.

In 1968, Kizirian uncovered the Tet Offensive, a military campaign that was launched on January 30, 1968, by forces of the Viet Cong and North Vietnam, after studying more than 400 intelligence reports and subsequently briefing General Creighton Adams. Kizirian's prediction of the 1968 Tet Offensive is considered one of Kizirian's greatest achievements of the war effort.

Though he did not graduate with his class, Col. Kizirian then attained his high school diploma. After receiving the diploma he studied at the U.S. Army War College where he graduated in 1970.

=== Service in Indonesia ===
In 1980, Kizirian became a defence official in Indonesia returning from a five-year active duty break. He was also the military attache to the Indonesian Republic. He finished his service in Indonesia in 1984 and retired once again.

== Later life ==
John Kizirian worked for the Martin Marietta Aerospace Cooperation for a year and a half. He became a consultant of various intelligence reports drafted at the time of the Iranian Revolution. The company planned to set up several signal intelligence sites in Iran to monitor activity related to the revolution.

After his military service, Kizirian was invited by Alexander M. Haig to serve in the office of the secretary of defense in the Pentagon. However, he declined the offer due to family health issues.

John Kizirian died February 26, 2006, at the Holmes Regional Medical Center in Melbourne, Florida. His funeral processions were conducted at St. Paul's Anglican Church in Melbourne and is buried at the Arlington National Cemetery in Arlington, Virginia.

== Personal life ==
Kizirian spoke fluent Armenian, Persian, Indonesian, Spanish and English.

Kizirian has been married three times. His first wife, Edith Tally, was born in Kansas. They adopted two children, Joanne and John. Edith died of cancer in 1986. Kizirian's second wife Barbara Holman was born in Tennessee and died in 1999. Kizirian's third marriage was with Carol Whittaker who was from California.

== Recognition and legacy ==
John Kizirian, a resident of Hawaii, was inducted into the Hawaii Army Museum Gallery of Heroes where a portrait of him hangs in the gallery.

In August 2005, Kizirian's niece, Lesley Kissick of Montara, California, wrote a letter to congressman Dave Weldon insisting that Kizirian deserves to be awarded the Medal of Honor.

== Military awards ==
Kizirian's military decorations and awards include:

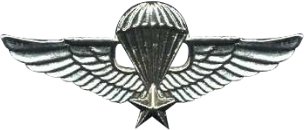

Uniform left side: Combat Infantryman Badge; Parachutist Badge
Distinguished Service Cross	Defense Distinguished; Service Medal	Silver Star	Legion of Merit (4 awards)
Distinguished Flying Cross	Soldier's Medal	Bronze Star Medal with V Device (6 awards)	Purple Heart (3 awards)
Meritorious Service Medal	Air Medal with V Device (14 awards)	Joint Service Commendation Medal	Army Commendation Medal with V Device (4 awards)
Navy Unit Commendation	Army Good Conduct Medal	Army of Occupation Medal	World War II Victory Medal
American Campaign Medal	Army Overseas Service Ribbon	Army Service Ribbon	Korean Service Medal
Republic of Korea; War Service Medal	Vietnam Armed Forces; Honor Medal	Vietnam Gallantry Cross with Gold and Silver Star	Vietnam Army Distinguished; Service Order (2nd class)
Vietnam Service Medal	Vietnam Campaign Medal	Vietnam Hazardous Service Medal	Indonesia Yudha Dharma Medal

Uniform right side: Republic of Vietnam Parachutist Badge
Presidential Unit Citation	Korea Presidential; Unit Citation	Vietnam Gallantry Cross; Unit Citation

The citation for Kizirian's Distinguished Service Cross reads:

The President of the United States of America, authorized by Act of Congress, July 9, 1918 (amended by act of July 25, 1963), takes pleasure in presenting the Distinguished Service Cross to Lieutenant Colonel (Military Intelligence Corps) John Kizirian (ASN: 0-91916), United States Army, for extraordinary heroism in connection with military operations involving conflict with an armed hostile force in the Republic of Vietnam, while serving with Advisory Team 95, Technical Intelligence Detachment, 525th Military Intelligence Group. Lieutenant Colonel Kizirian distinguished himself by exceptionally valorous actions on 12 and 13 May 1967 while serving as III Corps G-2 advisor on a combat patrol near Bien Hoa. Intelligence reports indicated that a Viet Cong force which had recently attacked the air base was operating in the vicinity, and he led a Vietnamese company-size combat patrol in pursuit of the enemy. Preplanned air strikes hit the hostile fortifications before he reached them, but he ignored the warning which the attack gave to the hostile forces and moved in to assess the bomb damage. He moved to the front of the patrol when it became momentarily disorganized in the dense jungle and quickly rallied his men and moved toward the objective. While crossing a river, he detected a fleeing Viet Cong force and immediately pursued them until he reached an area which he suspected was their camp. Deploying his main force for security, he led three men to the edge of a clearing but was pinned down by small arms and grenade fire. The company could not get to the firefight because of dense jungle and intense firepower which pinned them down, but Colonel Kizirian moved through a hail of bullets to lead them in an attack on the camp which routed the insurgents after they had suffered heavy casualties. He personally killed two insurgents with accurate fire and supervised the destruction of the bunker and tunnel complex used as a regimental base camp. While he led his men back to base, the Viet Cong repeatedly harassed the patrol from ambush. He exposed himself to withering fire time after time to fight furiously and inflict heavy casualties on the determined insurgents. Lieutenant Colonel Kizirian's extraordinary heroism and devotion to duty were in keeping with the highest traditions of the military service and reflect great credit upon himself, his unit, and the United States Army.
