= Whitinsville Christian School =

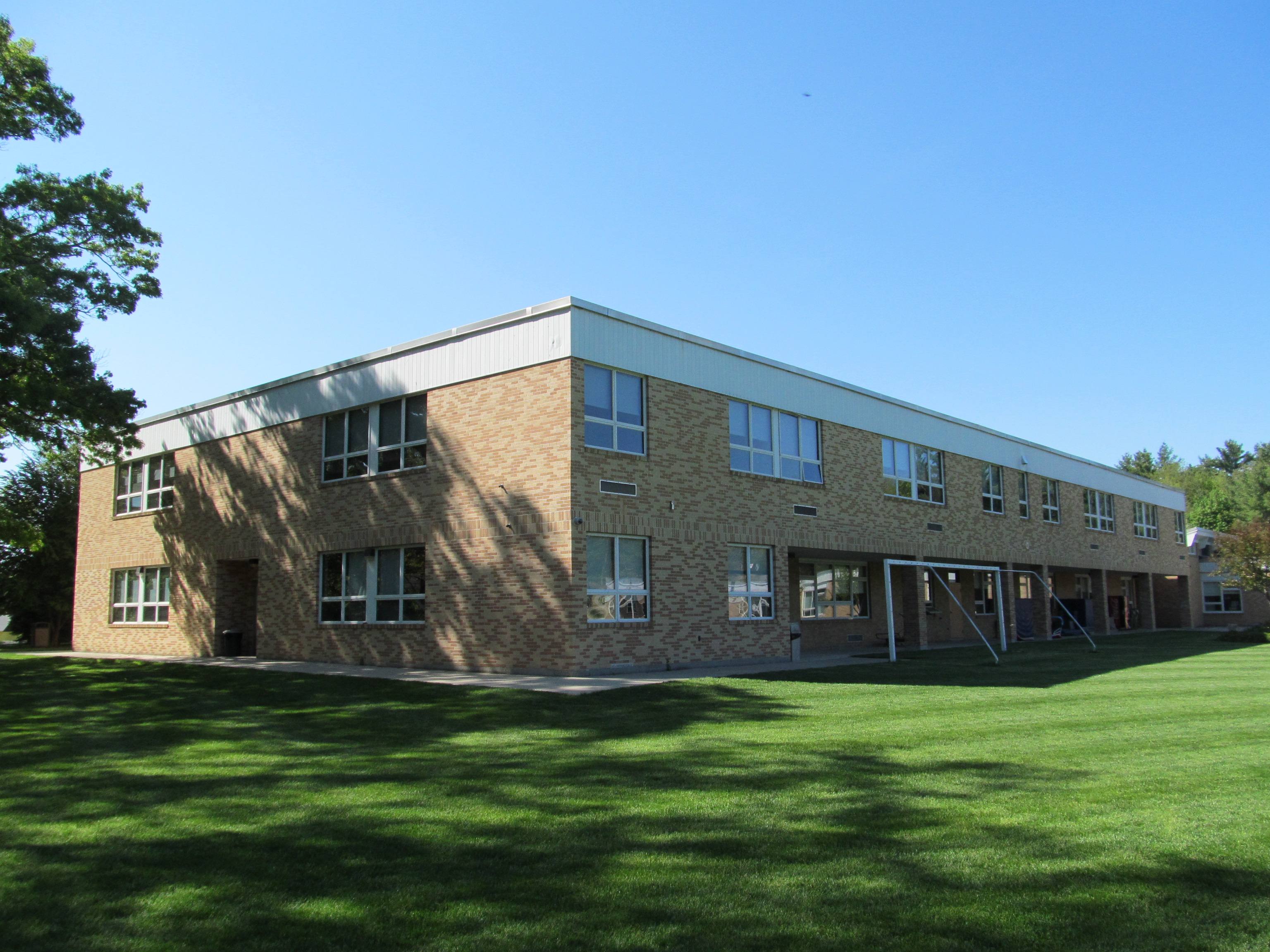

Location
- 279 Linwood Avenue; Whitinsville, Massachusetts; United States
- Coordinates: 42°06′23.5″N 71°39′13.6″W

Information
- Type: Christian day school
- Motto: Servatus Venia Per Fidem
- Established: 1928
- School district: Worcester County
- Principal: Sarah Bowler (head of school), Elisabeth Goodson (elementary); Mary Dykstra (middle); Tammi Gorman/Erin Lowery-Corkran (high)
- Faculty: 60
- Grades: K-12
- Enrollment: 644
- Campus size: 40 acres
- Campus type: Suburban
- Colors: Blue, White, and Yellow
- Athletics conference: Central Massachusetts Athletic Conference
- Mascot: Crusader
- Affiliation: Christian Schools International
- Website: http://www.whitinsvillechristian.org

Whitinsville Christian School is a pre-K-12 Christian day school, one of the oldest in Massachusetts. The school is organized into a preschool, elementary school (grades K-5), a middle school (grades 6-8) and a high school (grades 9-12). It is a member of Christian Schools International and is accredited by the New England Association of Schools and Colleges.

== History ==
In 1907, a group of fathers from the Christian Reformed Church of Whitinsville organized a Society for Christian Instruction. It was their desire and purpose to educate their children in a school where the Scripture was central to all of learning. In 1924, the Society was incorporated by the Commonwealth of Massachusetts as an educational institution. Classes began in 1928 in the basement of the Christian Reformed Church on Willow Street in Whitinsville.

== Tuition ==
Tuition for the 2025-2026 academic year is $19,050 for grades 9-12.
