= Northbridge Public Schools =

School district in Massachusetts, United States

Northbridge Public Schools is a school district serving Northbridge, Massachusetts, United States, including the community of Whitinsville.

The Administration Offices for the Northbridge Public Schools is located at 87 Linwood Avenue.

- PK-5 is located at the Northbridge Elementary School, located at 21 Crescent Street
- 6-8 is located at the Northbridge Middle School located at 171 Linwood Avenue
- 9-12 is located at the Northbridge High School located at 427 Linwood Avenue

== Athletics ==
NPS is known for their American football High school team, the Northbridge Rams. They have won 11 State Championships (1974, 1987, 1989, 1997, 1998, 2001, 2002, 2007, 2010, 2011, 2015). The district also offers golf, soccer, basketball, hockey, track and field, baseball, field hockey, flag football, softball, wrestling, cheerleading, cross country, swimming lacrosse and tennis. The sports teams will normally play the surrounding towns in Massachusetts, mainly Uxbridge, Millbury, and Auburn.
