= Whitinsville Historic District =

Historic district in Massachusetts, United States

- U.S. National Register of Historic Places
- U.S. Historic district
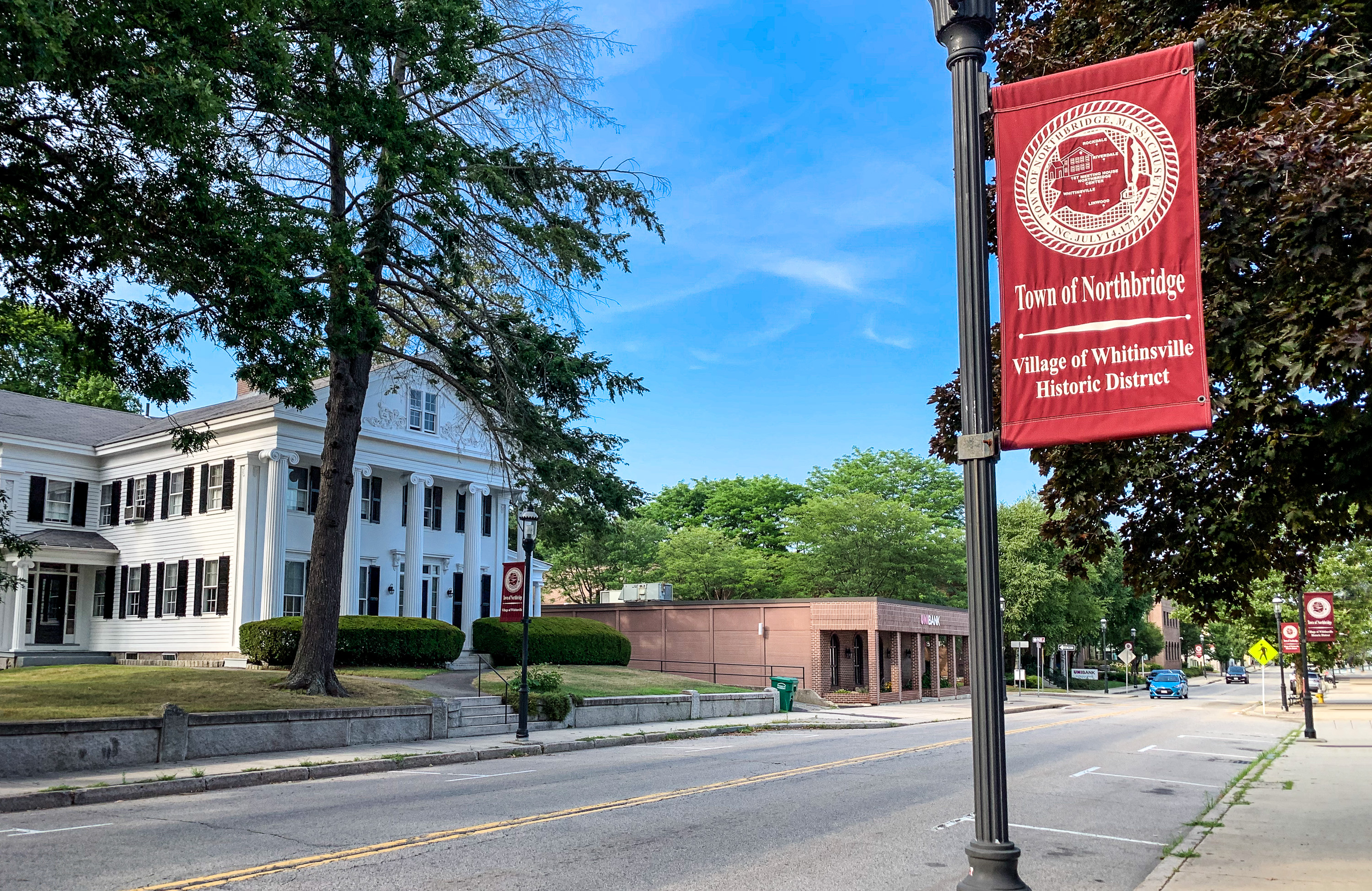
- Church Street

- Location within Massachusetts Location within the United States
- Location: Northbridge, Massachusetts
- Coordinates: 42°6′28″N 71°40′0″W
- Built: 1770
- Architect: Multiple
- Architectural style: Mid 19th Century Revival, Late 19th and 20th Century Revivals, Late Victorian
- NRHP reference No.: 83000613
- Added to NRHP: April 7, 1983

The Whitinsville Historic District is a historic district on Church, East, Fletcher, Hill, Woodland, Lake, and Water Sts., Castle Hill Rs., and Linwood Avenue in Northbridge, Massachusetts. The district encompasses the historic 19th century mill village of Whitinsville, which grew up around an 1826 brick mill building (which still stands) erected by Paul Whitin. The Whitin family came to dominate the textile trade in Northbridge, with numerous mill complexes.

In addition to mill buildings and mill worker housing, the district includes the 1938 post office building and the 1913 Whitinsville Social Library.

The district was added to the National Register of Historic Places in 1983. The district has been included as part of the Blackstone River Valley National Historical Park.

== Gallery ==
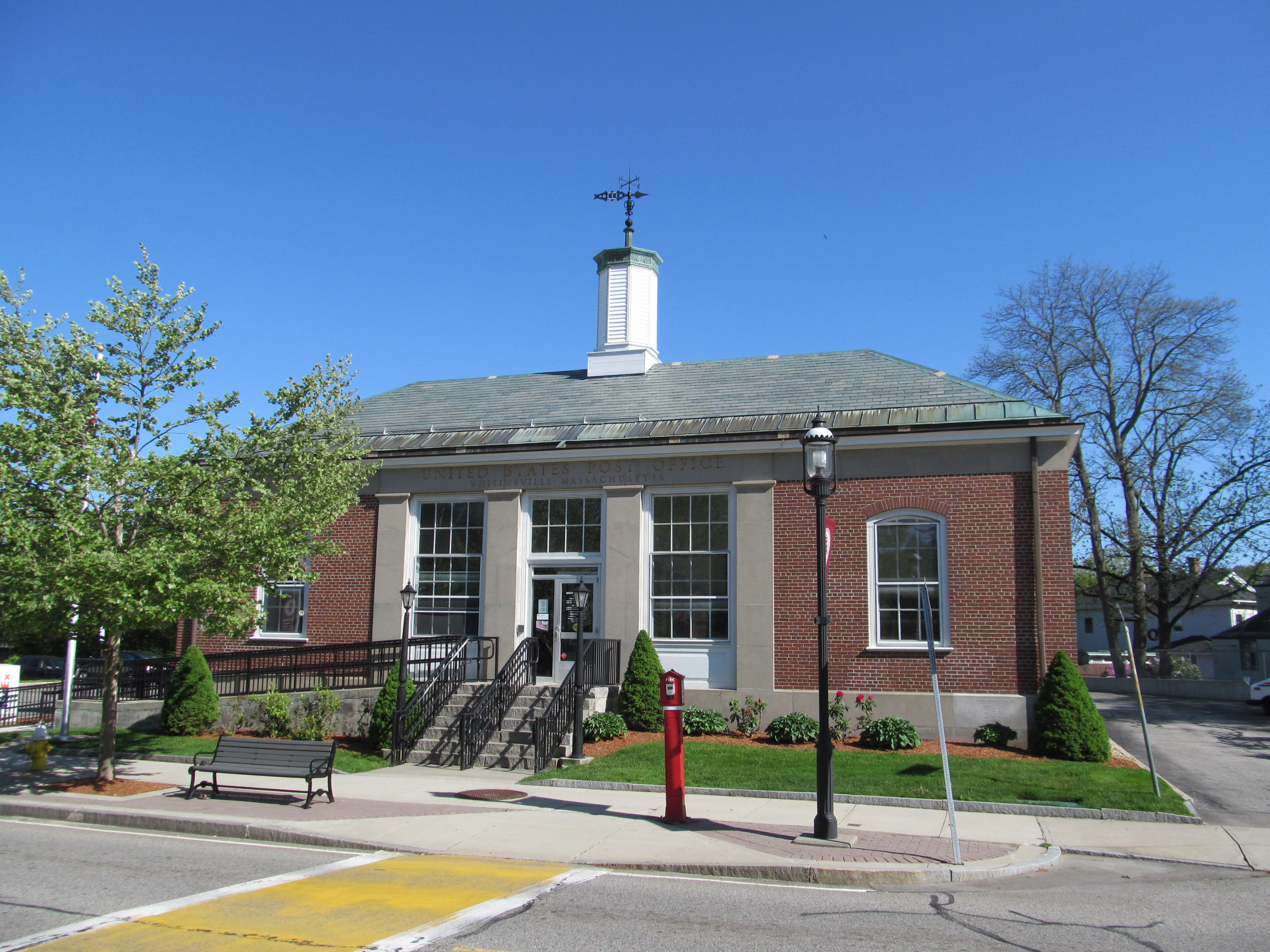
Post Office (1938)

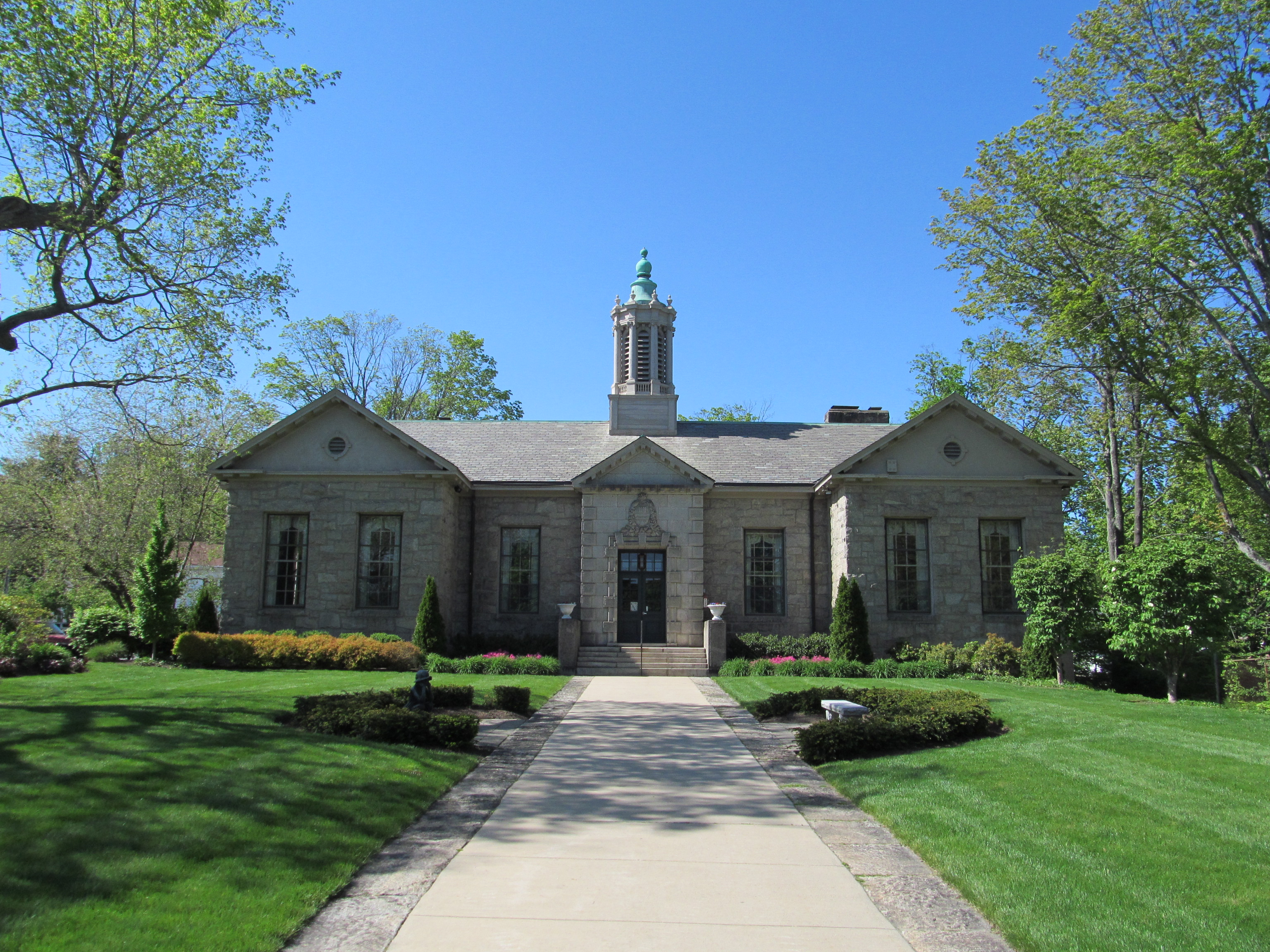
Whitinsville Social Library (1913)

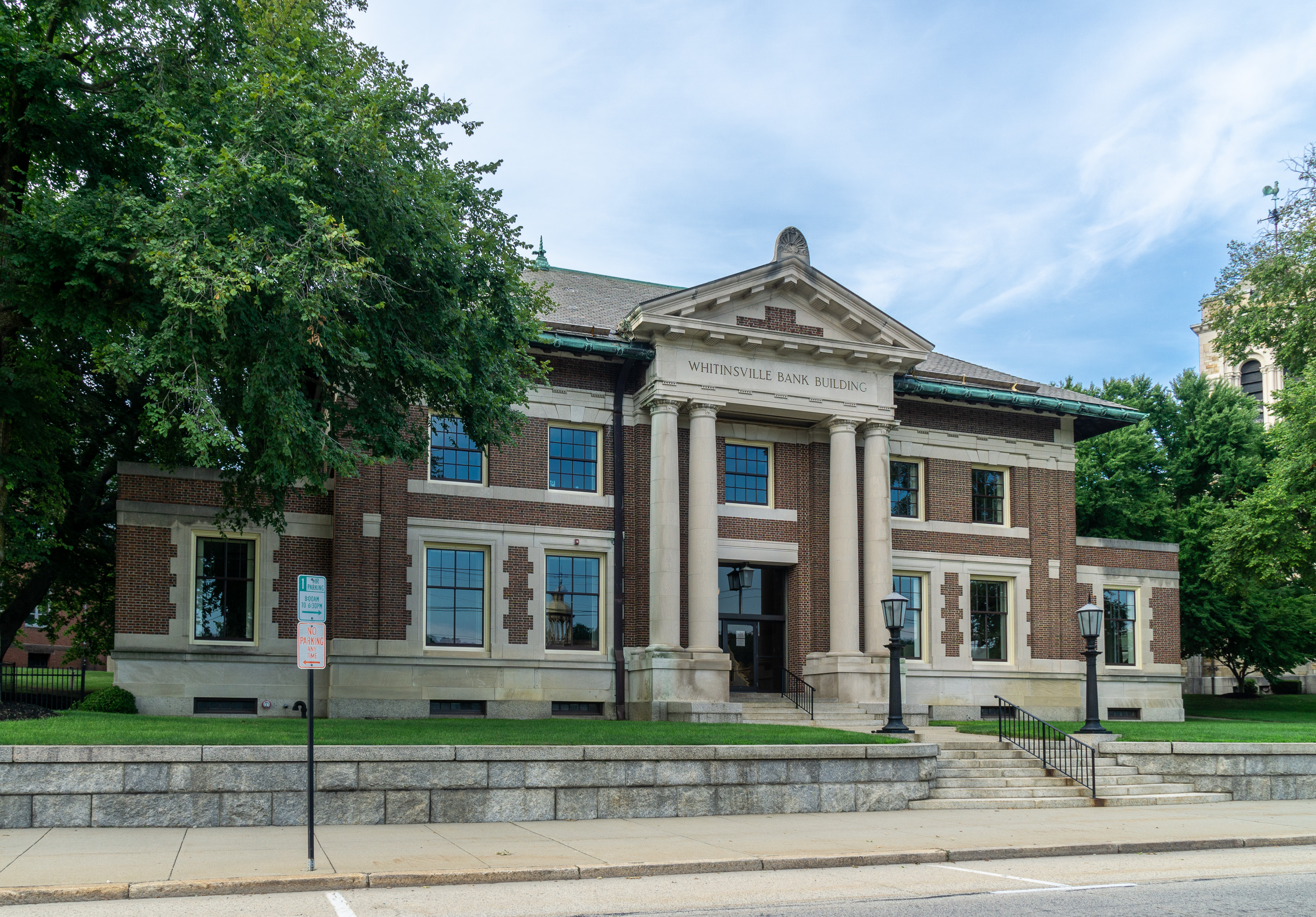
Whitinsville Bank Building (1905)

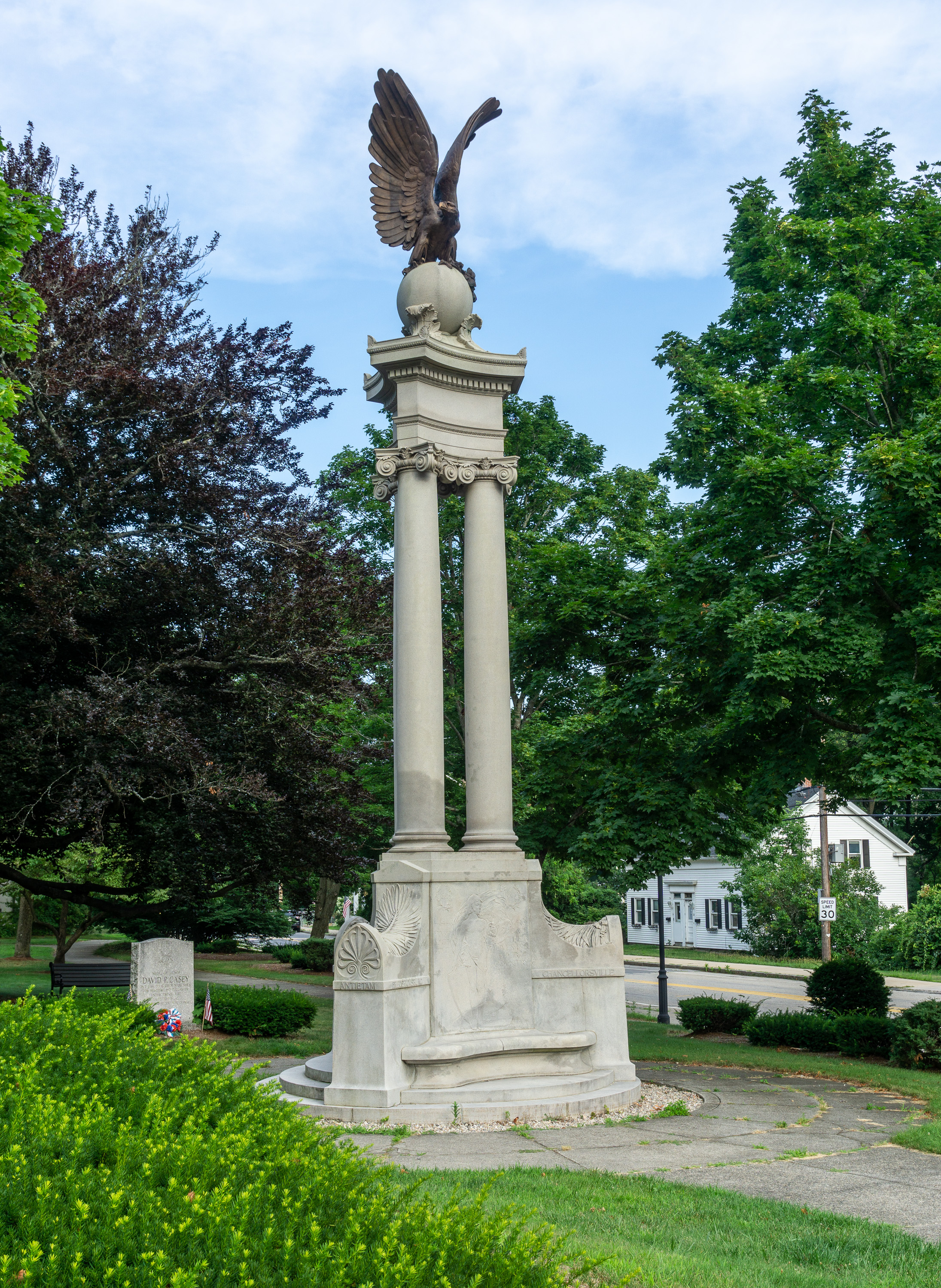
Civil War memorial

== See also ==
- National Register of Historic Places listings in Worcester County, Massachusetts
