= John Lawrence Thurston =

John Lawrence Thurston (August 4, 1874 – May 10, 1904) was an American Congregationalist missionary organizer and pioneer member of the Yale Mission to China, later known as the Yale-China Association. Thurston first gained prominence through leadership in the Yale Missionary Band, an interdenominational missionary education movement that toured throughout the United States in the late 1890s. He later helped conceptualize and organize the Yale Mission to China, an educational and missionary enterprise established in the aftermath of the Boxer Rebellion. Though his direct missionary career in China was brief due to severe illness, Thurston played a foundational role in shaping the philosophy and institutional direction of the Yale-China movement.

== Early life and education ==
John Lawrence Thurston was born on August 4, 1874, in the Congregational parsonage at Whitinsville, Massachusetts. He was the second son of Reverend John Rogers Thurston and Caroline Augusta Woodbury Storey Thurston. The Thurston family traced its ancestry to early English Protestant roots. reflecting a longstanding religious His father influenced his intellectual and religious development. The elder Thurston attended Yale University and had intended to become a missionary to China, but illness prevented him. He served as minister in Whitinsville while also holding public office in Massachusetts.

Thurston’s childhood was shaped partly by chronic illness. Around age three, he suffered from a severe cold followed by “marasmus,” leaving him physically weak for several years. As a child, Thurston became fascinated with missionary biographies and travel literature read aloud by his mother, especially works concerning David Livingstone, Pacific missions, and exploration narratives.

Thurston began formal schooling relatively late, entering primary school around age seven. Between 1887 and 1889, he studied under teacher Ella Aldrich, whose mathematical instruction later proved foundational for his academic success. In 1889, Thurston entered Worcester Academy, a New England preparatory school led by Principal Daniel Webster Abercrombie. Thurston participated in the school YMCA, the Christian Endeavour Society, and the Agassiz Association, a student natural history organization. An influential moment came when he heard a medical missionary speak about work in Ceylon prompted him to think seriously about missionary medicine as a profession. He attended the Christian Endeavour convention in Montreal in 1893, where exposure to evangelical missionary activism deepened his religious commitment. By the mid-1890s he had largely resolved to dedicate his life to Christian service.

Thurston entered Yale University. He became involved with Dwight Hall and Yale’s Christian Association, which organized student religious and social service activities. A pivotal turning point occurred in February 1895 following visits from missionary leader George Sherwood Eddy and representatives of the Student Volunteer Movement. Thurston formally volunteered for foreign missionary service. During his later Yale years, Thurston emerged as a significant missionary organizer. He served on the Foreign Missions Committee of the Christian Association, eventually chaired the committee, and led Yale’s Student Volunteer Band.

Thurston proposed ideas that evolved into the Yale Missionary Band, an interdenominational missionary education movement designed to increase missionary awareness among Protestant youth organizations throughout the United States. The Yale Missionary Band became one of the earliest large-scale interdenominational missionary education movements organized by American university students.

Thurston entered Auburn Theological Seminary in 1899.

== Personal life ==
In September 1902, Thurston married Matilda Calder in Hartford, Connecticut. He was ordained to the Congregational ministry later that month at his father’s church in Whitinsville.

== Career ==
The Yale Mission to China emerged during the period immediately following the Boxer Rebellion. Religious revivals at Yale and broader missionary enthusiasm encouraged groups of Yale graduates and theological students to consider establishing a university-affiliated mission abroad.

Thurston joined the planning process while studying at Auburn Seminary and quickly became one of its most influential organizers. Though initially uncertain about the project’s feasibility, he gradually embraced the mission enthusiastically.

Thurston and his wife departed North America in September 1902. In letters written before departure, he acknowledged that missionary service involved sacrifices difficult for outsiders to understand. Traveling across Canada toward Vancouver, Thurston became deeply impressed by the landscapes of the Rocky Mountains, Selkirks, and Cascades. The subsequent Pacific crossing proved turmultuous and physically taxing. Severe storms battered the ship, producing enormous waves, widespread seasickness, and dangerous conditions on deck.

Before arriving in China, Thurston spent time in Japan, visiting Yokohama, Kobe, and Nagasaki. Thurston was impressed by Japan because of its visible modernization following the Meiji Restoration.

After arriving in Shanghai, Thurston consulted experienced missionaries and educational leaders concerning the future direction of the Yale Mission. Robert E. Lewis encouraged the Yale Mission to focus on specialized educational work in Hunan province rather than diffuse general missionary activity. Traveling onward to Tianjin and Beijing, Thurston settled into missionary life shortly after the Boxer Rebellion. Thurston criticized simplistic Western stereotypes and argued that many Americans fundamentally misunderstood China.

Thurston devoted enormous energy to learning Chinese. Letters repeatedly described the process as exhausting and mentally discouraging. At the same time, he increasingly recognized that language acquisition represented more than a practical necessity. It became central to his belief that missionaries must genuinely understand Chinese culture rather than simply impose Western ideas superficially.

In 1903, Thurston participated in exploratory travel through parts of northern and central China on behalf of the Yale Mission. The journeys exposed him to the immense physical difficulties of travel in inland China during the late Qing period. Roads were often primitive, muddy, steep, or nearly impassable. Travel by mule litter produced severe physical strain, while inns frequently lacked sanitation and comfort.

Travel also deepened his awareness of rural poverty and social inequality. He observed intense agricultural labor, environmental degradation, crowded villages, and widespread material deprivation. The journeys included visits to Changsha, capital of Hunan province. There, Thurston and his associates met reform-minded Chinese officials and educational leaders interested in cooperation with Western institutions.

Chinese officials eventually invited the Yale Mission to help establish modern educational institutions in Changsha. Thurston interpreted this invitation as evidence of changing attitudes toward Western education after the Boxer crisis. The proposal became central to the future direction of the Yale Mission.

Thurston increasingly believed missionary work should move beyond traditional evangelism toward broader institutional engagement. He regarded educational work as especially important because he believed China’s future would largely be shaped by educated elites emerging during the reform era. Thurston also believed hospitals and medical education could both alleviate suffering and demonstrate Christianity through practical service.

== Return ==
Soon after establishing himself in China, Thurston’s health began deteriorating dramatically. He experienced severe exhaustion and respiratory illness and by 1903, physicians suspected he had developed tuberculosis. Fellow missionaries and doctors ordered him to return to the United States. He remained intellectually engaged with the Yale Mission and continued corresponding extensively with missionaries and Yale associates.

Thurston's later writings became increasingly reflective and philosophical. He contemplated themes of suffering, unfinished vocation, spiritual obedience, mortality, and sacrifice.

== Death and legacy ==
Thurston died in Claremont, Los Angeles, California, on May 10, 1904. The immediate causes of death were reported as pulmonary tuberculosis and cerebral embolism after a prolonged period of declining health following his return from China.

Memorial writings emphasized both the tragedy of his early death and the significance of the vision he had helped establish for the Yale Mission to China. Thurston’s body was returned to Massachusetts and buried at Pine Grove Cemetery in Whitinsville on May 20, 1904.

Although John Lawrence Thurston’s direct missionary career in China was brief, his influence persisted through the continuing development of the Yale-China Association. The institutions later established in Changsha, including schools, educational programs, hospitals, and broader cultural initiatives, reflected many of Thurston’s original ideas concerning education, medicine, and intellectual engagement. The Yale-China movement eventually became one of the most important university-affiliated missionary enterprises in China during the early twentieth century.
