= Whitinsville, Massachusetts =

- Census-designated place
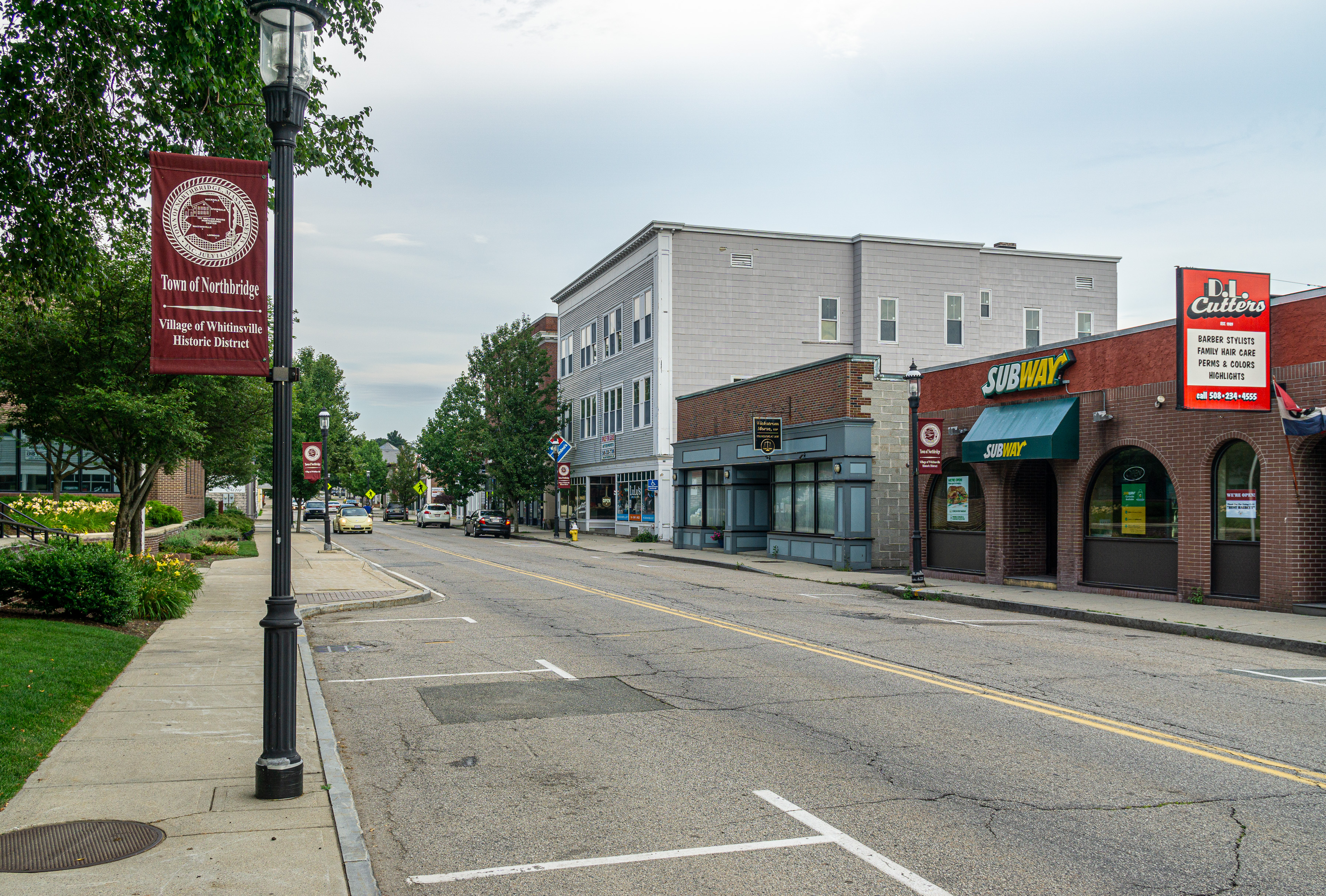
- Downtown Whitinsville

- Location in Worcester County and the state of Massachusetts.

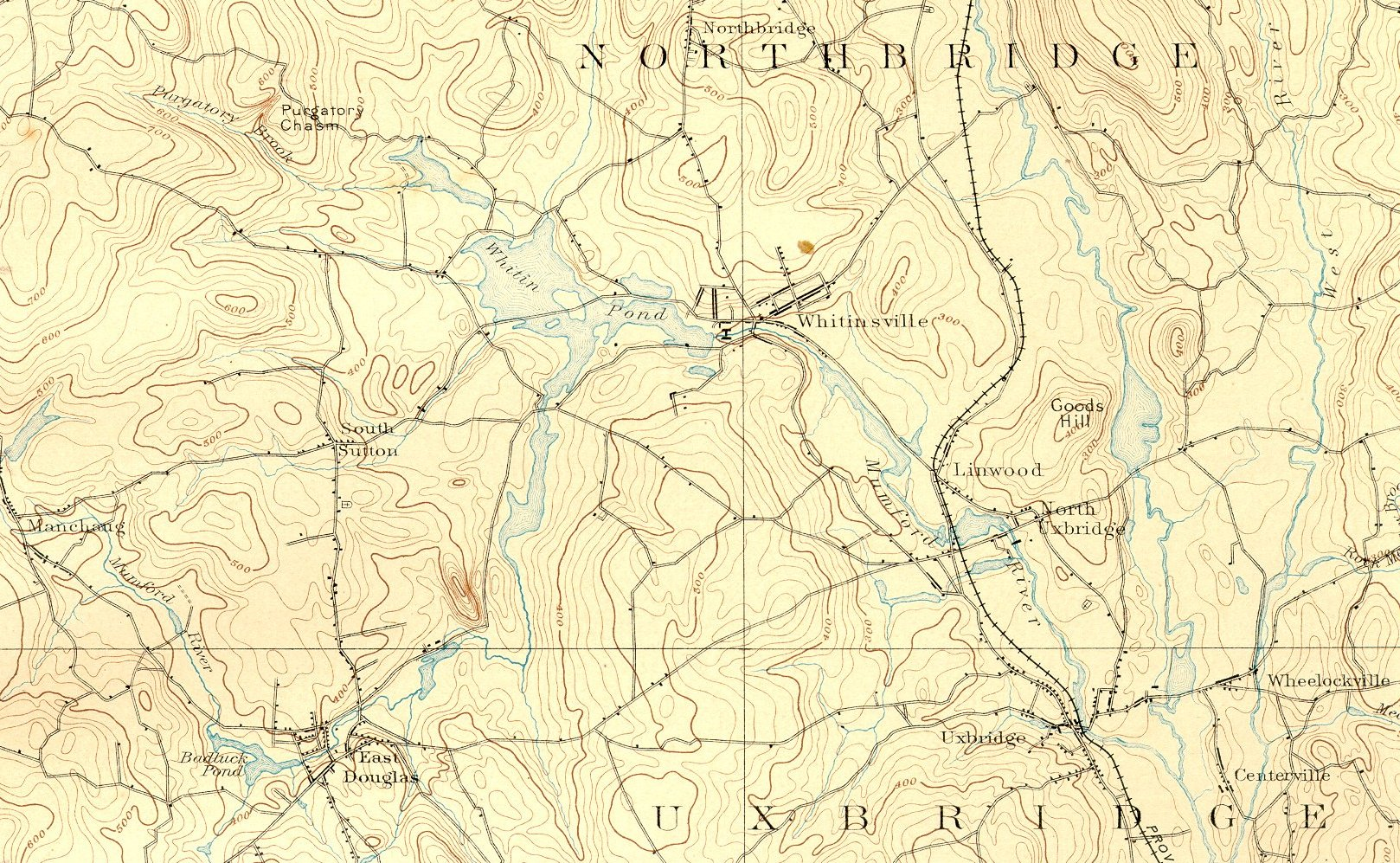
- Area map
- Coordinates: 42°6′44″N 71°40′22″W
- Country: United States
- State: Massachusetts
- County: Worcester

Government
  - Type: (None) Part of Northbridge, Massachusetts

Area
  - Total: 4.03 sq mi (10.43 km^{2})
  - Land: 3.64 sq mi (9.43 km^{2})
  - Water: 0.39 sq mi (1.00 km^{2})
- Elevation: 322 ft (98 m)

Population (2020)
  - Total: 6,750
  - Density: 1,853.2/sq mi (715.52/km^{2})
- Time zone: UTC−5 (Eastern (EST))
  - Summer (DST): UTC−4 (EDT)
- ZIP Codes: 01588 (Whitinsville); 01534 (Northbridge)
- Area code: 508
- FIPS code: 79495
- GNIS feature ID: 0611078

Whitinsville is an unincorporated village within the town of Northbridge in Worcester County, Massachusetts, United States. Whitinsville is a census-designated place (CDP) and its population was 6,750 at the 2020 census. Whitinsville is pronounced as if it were spelled "White-ins-ville." It was founded by the Whitin family, after whom it is also named. It is a post office jurisdiction, with a ZIP Code of 01588. It is located on the Mumford River, a tributary of the Blackstone River.

Whitinsville has been designated as a mill village of national historic significance to America's earliest industrialization, and is one of only four villages selected by the John H. Chaffee Blackstone River Valley National Historic Corridor Commission to receive this designation. Hopedale is the only other Massachusetts mill village to achieve this designation by the corridor commission.

== History ==
A Mill Village

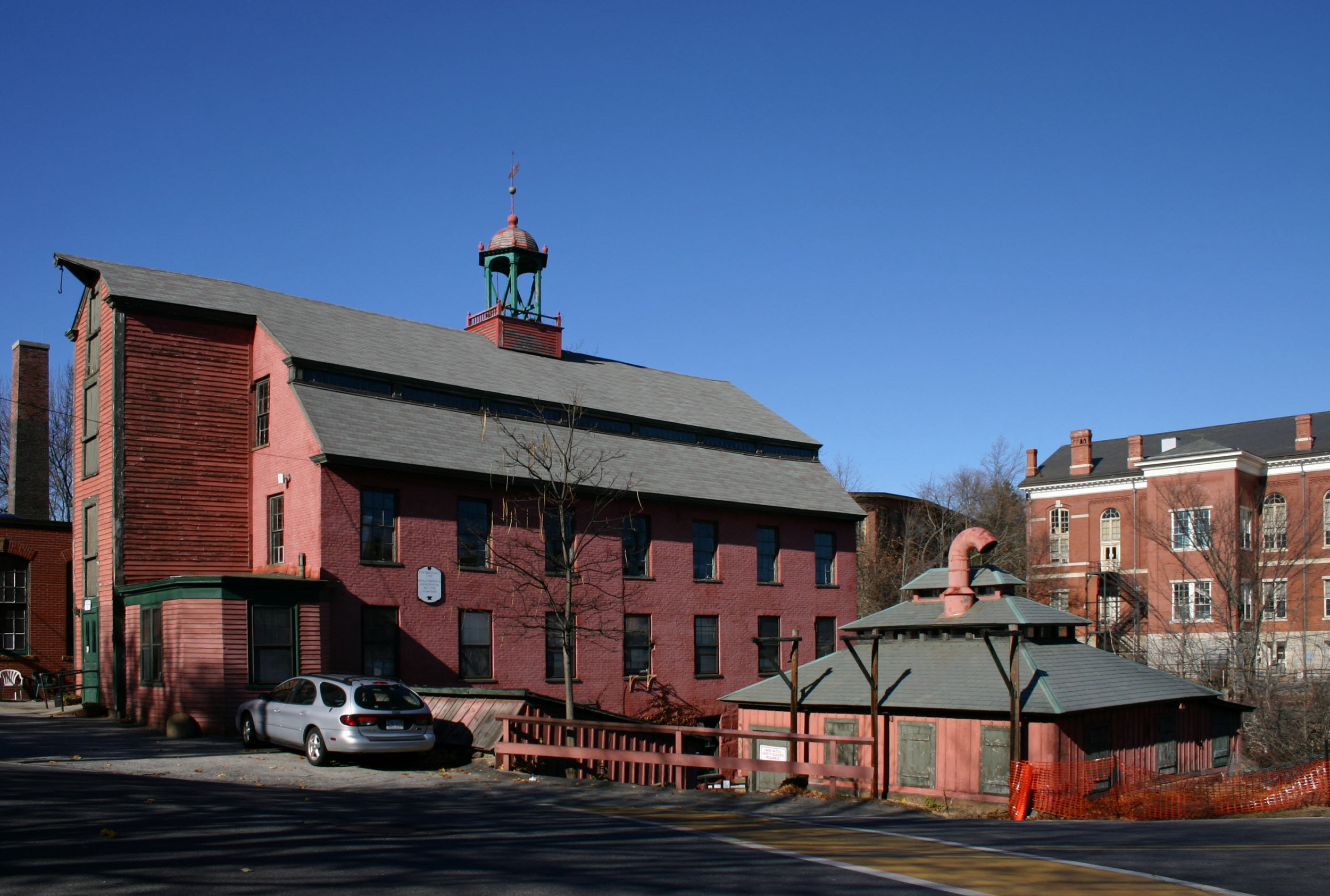
The Brick Mill, 1826

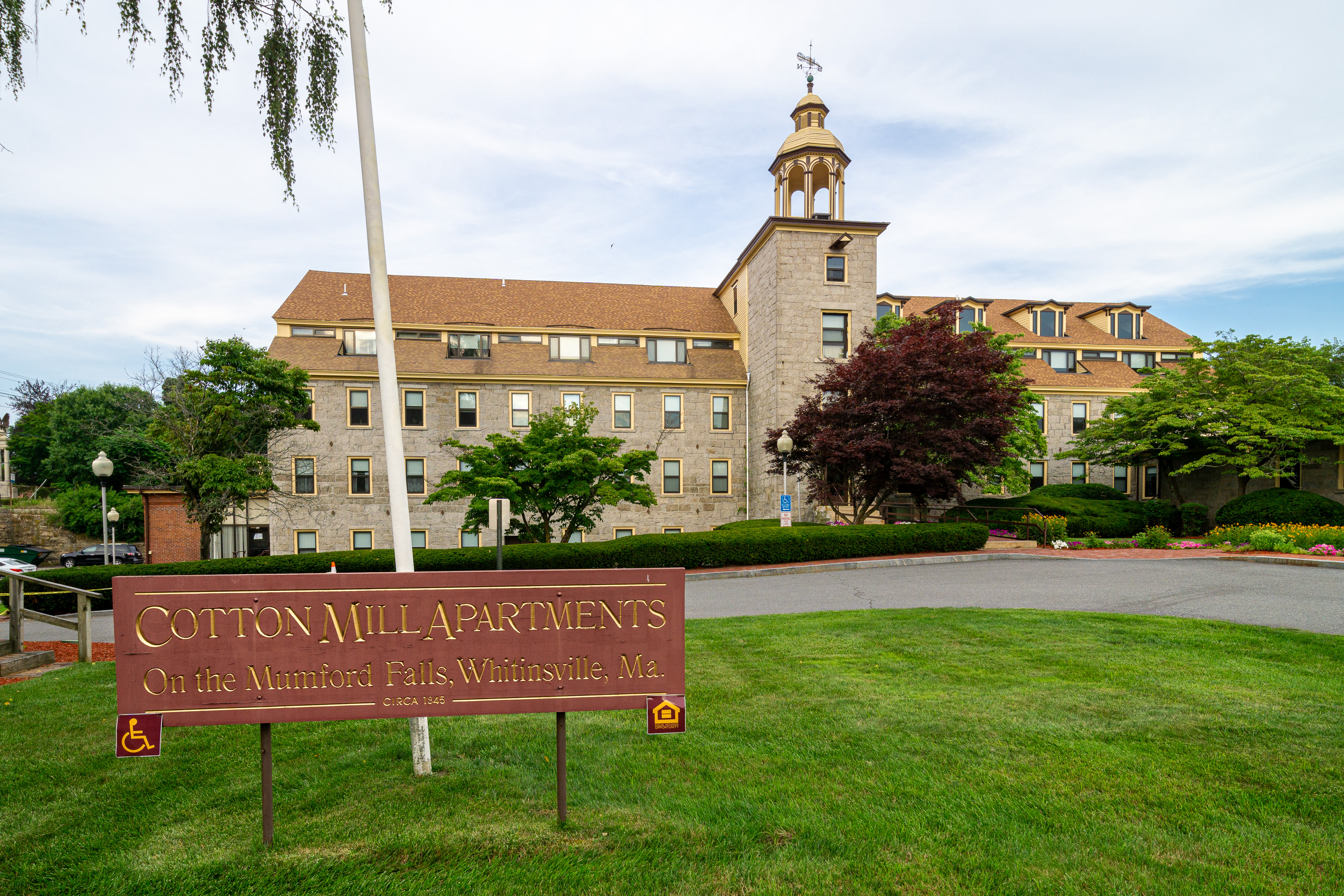
Whitinsville Cotton Mill, 1846

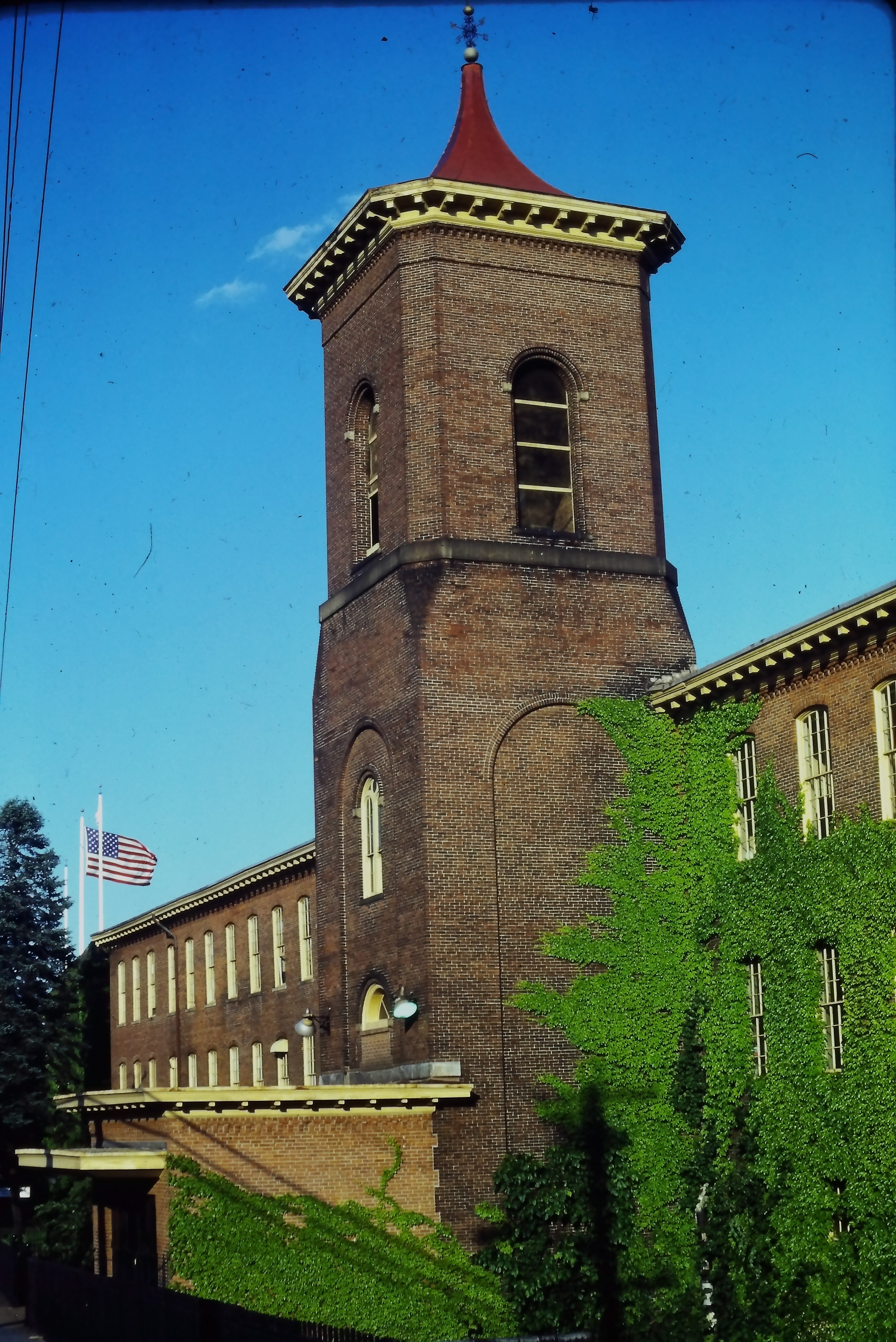
Whitin Machine Works

This village was originally Nipmuc native lands, and was first settled as part of Mendon in 1662. From 1662 to 1727 it was part of Mendon, then later it became part of Uxbridge from 1727 to 1772. In 1772 Northbridge finally became a separate town. The village's early name was "South Northbridge", before the Whitin family's rise to prominence. Col. John Spring led a militia training company from Uxbridge which fought in the American Revolution. Col. Spring was from the section that became South Northbridge.

Today a visitor can see much of the original village, including the housing for workers and their families, churches, and the Whitin Community Center. The textile machine company and industrial village were written up as one of the Harvard studies of history in business. Whitin Machine, founded in 1831, became the largest manufacturer of textile machinery in the world before its closing in 1964.

A 1936 Berlin Olympics champion backstroke swimmer, Alice Bridges, then of Uxbridge, trained in the local gym pool (Whitin Community Center) in Whitinsville. The Whitinsville Savings Bank was involved in a precedent-setting case in the U.S., involving tort and contract law, known as "Swinton vs. Whitinsville Savings Bank (1942)". A real estate transaction two years earlier had failed to disclose termites in a building.

== Whitin Community Center ==
The Whitin Community Center, operated by a non-profit organization and commonly called "The Gym", is located at 60 Main Street on what used to be the 11-acre (45,000 m^{2}) John C. Whitin estate. In 1922, four Whitin daughters: Elsa, Katharine, Lois, and Elizabeth, gave the funds to build a gym and pool for the enjoyment of local citizens in memory of their father, George Marston Whitin. This recreation center, known affectionately in earlier days as "The Gym," was one of the finest facilities in the state. Famous for its swim program, it sent swimmers to the 1932 and 1936 Olympics. Devastated by fire in 1959, the Gym was rebuilt with the support of trustees, business and civic leaders, and friends.

The decade of the 1990s was dedicated to expanding and modernizing the Whitin Community Center to prepare it for the 21st century. In 1993 new space was added to strengthen the center's commitment to child care and adult health and fitness. A new lobby, elevator, and racquetball courts completed this expansion phase, and most of the original 1922 building received a comprehensive face lift. In 1995, the center's three outdoor tennis courts were completely refurbished. Ground was broken in September 1996 for a new state-of-the-art competition-sized swimming pool. This new facility opened briefly as an outdoor pool (summer 1998) and then was enclosed for year-round use, reopening in March 1999. A comprehensive project to restore the historic appearance of the Main Street facade was undertaken in 1998–99, funded by individuals, local companies, and the Massachusetts Historical Commission. Also in 1999, the center's parking facilities were expanded to accommodate the increased business. An ambitious plan to restore and beautify historic Whitin Park (the 7.5 acres behind the Whitin Community Center) was unveiled in early 2000. The nearly 1 mile of stone perimeter walls were rebuilt, repointed and recapped. New walking trails were surfaced, and beautiful park lights and bollards have been installed. In the location of an original Whitin estate building – the rustic teahouse – the Gerry Gaudette pavilion has been built. This open air shelter is used by the center's child care and summer camp program, along with use by the community at large.

The Whitin Community Center is an organization with 4,500 members. The center also, through its mission, services at least as many non-members. It is a recognized 501(c)(3) non-profit organization providing child care and family recreational services. With over 200 families currently served, it is the largest Child Care Center in the Blackstone Valley with a pre-kindergarten school, full day care for pre-schoolers, and a large school-age program that provides supervision before and after school, and all day long on school vacation periods.

The center launched a new Outreach program in 1995, funded entirely by donations, with the goal of bringing together all the children of the community, regardless of neighborhoods, economic status, or whether or not they were Center members. Organized Saturday afternoon activities, open swimming, day trips to museums and baseball games, youth theater, teen dances, and concerts are just some of the many activities. In January 2002 a new facility opened – the Rockdale Youth Center – providing free after school programs and supervision for youngsters ages 8–13. In the fall of 2005, the Center purchased the building housing the program (2219 Providence Road, Northbridge).

== St. Camillus Health Center ==
The St. Camillus Health Center, originally St. Camillus Hospital for Incurable Diseases, is located at 447 Hill Street on the historic E. Kent Swift Estate named for the husband of one of George Marston Whitin's daughters. The historic mansion on the rear of the estate was restored in 1999 and is now known as Father Turci Manor.

== Pine Grove Cemetery ==
Endowed in 1878 by members of the Whitin family, the 35-acre historic cemetery is located on 241 Linwood Ave. The cemetery was put up for sale by the Pine Grove Cemetery Association in 2011, and is currently owned by the Town of Northbridge.

== Geography ==
Whitinsville is located at 42°6′44″N 71°40′22″W (42.112208, -71.672890).

According to the 2010 United States Census Bureau, the CDP has a total area of 3.64 square miles with 1,840.2 persons per square mile. Whitinsville is a "village" within the incorporated town of Northbridge, Massachusetts. It is located in Worcester County.

== Climate ==
In a typical year, Whitinsville, Massachusetts temperatures fall below 50 °F (10 °C) for 195 days per year. Annual precipitation is typically 46.3 inches per year (high in the US) and snow covers the ground 60 days per year or 16.4% of the year (high in the US). It may be helpful to understand the yearly precipitation by imagining 9 straight days of moderate rain per year. The humidity is below 60% for approximately 25.4 days or 7% of the year.

== Demographics ==
Historical population
Census	Pop.	Note	%±
2020	6,750		—
U.S. Decennial Census

Churches

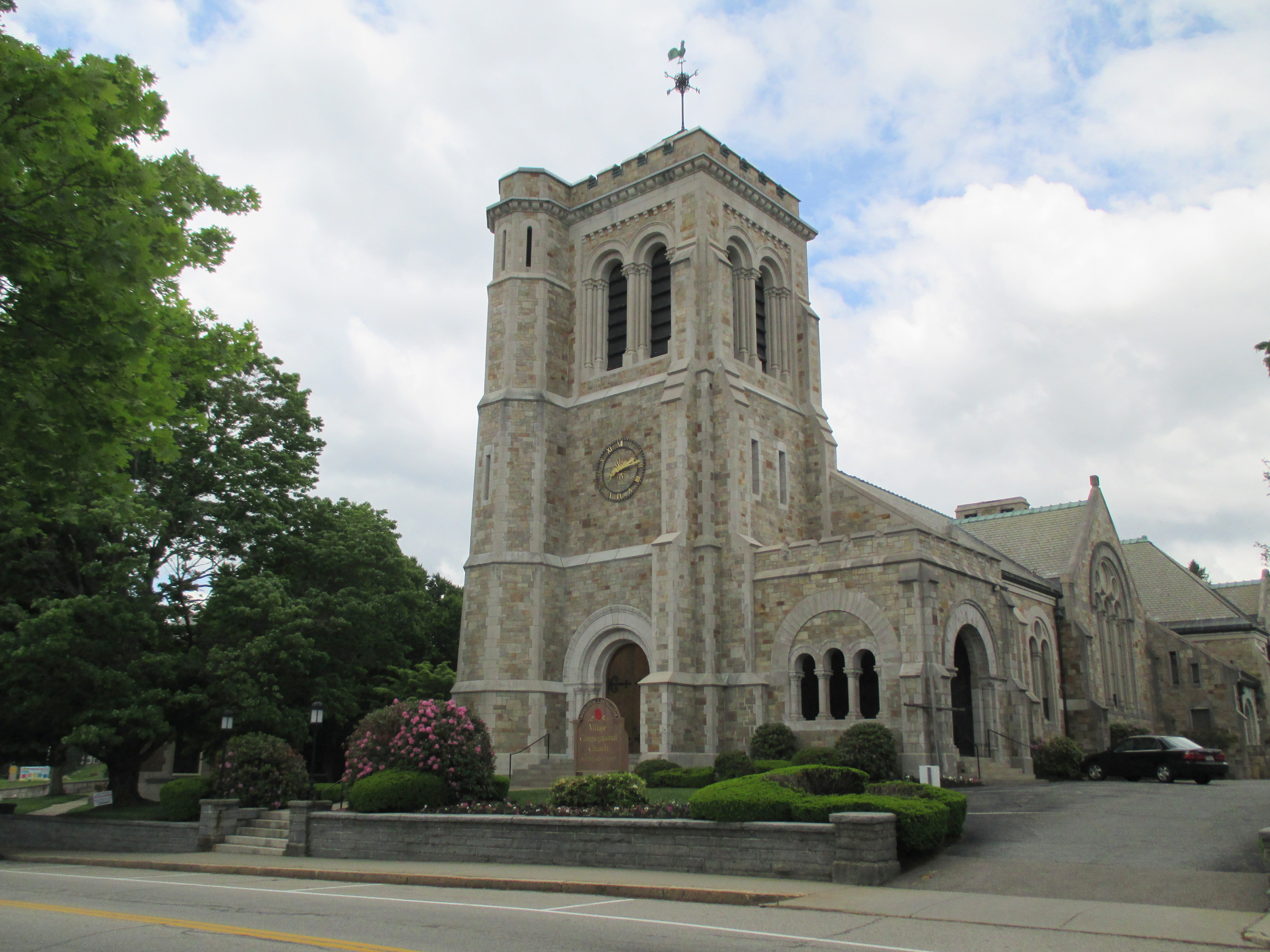
Village Congregational Church

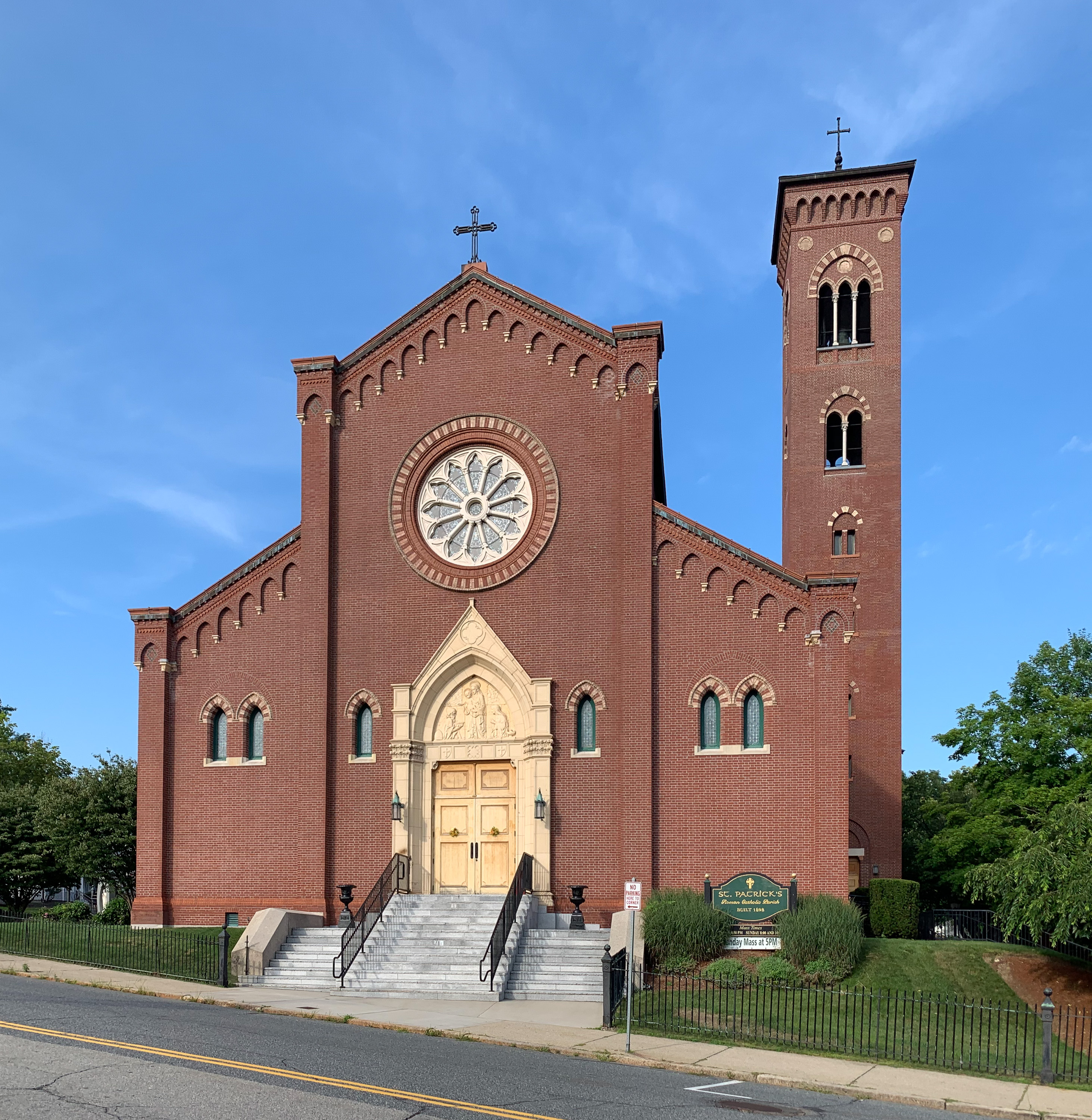
St. Patrick's Church

=== 2020 census ===
As of the 2020 census, Whitinsville had a population of 6,750. The median age was 40.3 years. 22.0% of residents were under the age of 18 and 15.9% of residents were 65 years of age or older. For every 100 females there were 94.5 males, and for every 100 females age 18 and over there were 92.3 males age 18 and over.

100.0% of residents lived in urban areas, while 0.0% lived in rural areas.

There were 2,625 households in Whitinsville, of which 33.4% had children under the age of 18 living in them. Of all households, 46.2% were married-couple households, 18.3% were households with a male householder and no spouse or partner present, and 25.8% were households with a female householder and no spouse or partner present. About 26.9% of all households were made up of individuals and 11.0% had someone living alone who was 65 years of age or older.

There were 2,737 housing units, of which 4.1% were vacant. The homeowner vacancy rate was 0.9% and the rental vacancy rate was 3.2%.

Racial composition as of the 2020 census
Race	Number	Percent
White	5,896	87.3%
Black or African American	101	1.5%
American Indian and Alaska Native	8	0.1%
Asian	95	1.4%
Native Hawaiian and Other Pacific Islander	1	0.0%
Some other race	194	2.9%
Two or more races	455	6.7%
Hispanic or Latino (of any race)	396	5.9%

=== 2010 census ===
As of the 2010 census, there were 6,704. The population density was 1,840.2/mi. Females comprise 52.1% of the population. The racial makeup of the CDP was 95.2% White, 0.8% African American, 0.2% Native American, 1.1% Asian, and 1.7% from two or more races. Hispanic or Latino of any race were 3.8% of the population. 4.6% of households speak a language other than English.

There were 2,613 housing units with 44.4% of these in multi-unit structures. The homeownership rate is 58.9% with 85.9% of persons residing in the same housing unit for 1 year or more. The median value of owner-occupied housing unit was $341,000.

There were 2,452 households. The average household size was 2.87. In the CDP, the population was spread out, with 7.4% under the age of 5, 28.1% under the age of 18, and 12.0% who were 65 years of age or older. 85.9% of persons over the age of 25 are high school graduates with 27.2% having a bachelor's degree or higher. The average commute to work is 29.2 minutes.

The median income for a household in the CDP was $55,950. The median income for individuals was $27,531. 6.5% of the population were below the poverty line.

=== Ethnic groups ===
The 19th-century expansion of the Whitin mills attracted many Irish immigrant workers, and Irish currently make up 21.4% of the town's population. Other nationalities represented in Whitinsville include Armenians, English, Italians, French-Canadians, and Dutch.

== Education ==
Since it is officially a part of the town of Northbridge, Whitinsville is served by the Northbridge Public Schools system. Also in the town is Whitinsville Christian School, a preK–12 interdenominational Christian school.

== Government ==
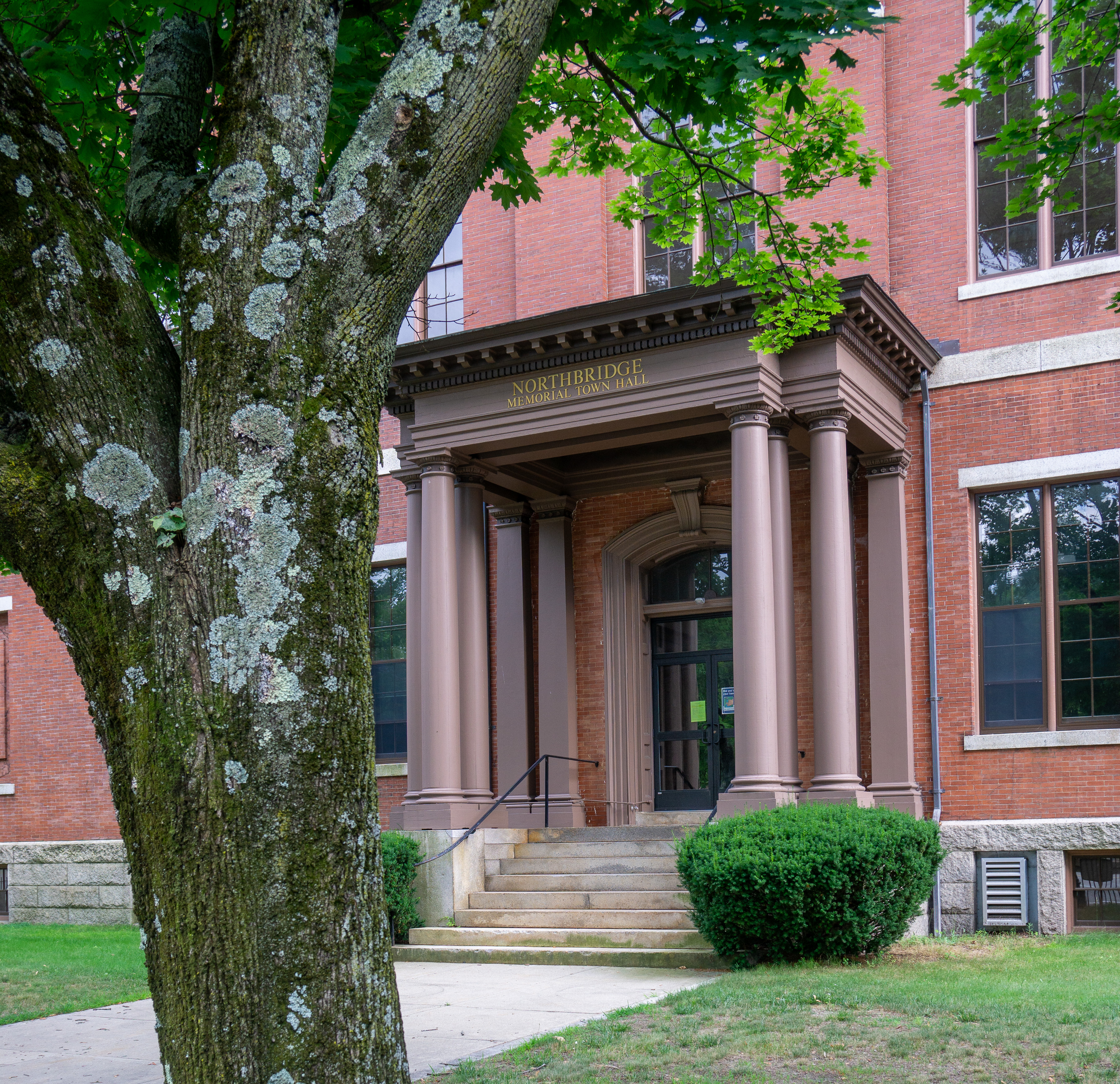
Northbridge Memorial Town Hall

Whitinsville is a village within the town of Northbridge. New England towns, like Northbridge, administer the entire geography within their boundaries and function like a city and a county government rolled into one. The county government is weak or non-existent in the southern New England states. Worcester County exists today only as a historical area, with an elected County Sheriff, an elected county registrar of deeds, and a correctional and court system, which are now administered by the Commonwealth of Massachusetts, and its Office of Public Safety. County commissioners were last elected in 1999, and local roads are now administered either by the towns or the state.

The Northbridge Town Hall is located at 7 Main Street in Whitinsville, the largest village in the town. It was built in 1876, and from 1876 to 1913 it served as the public library. The Town Hall was extensively renovated in 2013.

Northbridge is organized and administered as a town under Massachusetts law. The Board of Selectmen exercises executive functions, while the annual Town Meeting functions like a city council. Police, public works, the board of health, fire department and schools are part of the town government.

== Notable people ==
- Vernon Ahmadjian, lichenologist
- John R. Driscoll, Massachusetts businessman and state legislator, was born in Whitinsville.
- John Kizirian, was a highly decorated member of the United States Armed Forces for over three decades and served during World War II, the Korean War, and the Vietnam War.
- Steve Spagnuolo, current defensive coordinator of the Kansas City Chiefs, former head coach of the St. Louis Rams of the National Football League, and former defensive coach of the New York Giants, was born in Whitinsville in 1959.
- Samuel Spring, Revolutionary War chaplain, was born here when it was still part of Uxbridge.
- John Lawrence Thurston, missionary to China, born in Whitinsville in 1874
- Phil Vandersea, was born in Whitinsville in 1943, played for the Green Bay Packers.
- Hildegarde Lasell Watson, singer, actress, arts patron, writer
- Sarah Elizabeth Whitin, sole benefactor for the Whitin Observatory at Wellesley College.
- Paul Whitin, founder of the Whitin Machine Works

== See also ==
- Whitin Machine Works
- Whitinsville Historic District
