= MIAA Division 1A boys' ice hockey tournament =

Massachusetts high school hockey tournament

MIAA Division 1A Boys' Ice Hockey Tournament
- Sport: Ice hockey
- Founded: 1991
- Administrator: Barry Haley
- No. of teams: 10
- Venue: TD Garden (finals)
- Most titles: Catholic Memorial School (13)

The MIAA Division 1A Boys' Ice Hockey Tournament, commonly referred to as the Super Eight, was an annual boys' high school ice hockey tournament held by the Massachusetts Interscholastic Athletic Association (MIAA) to determine the top boys' team in the state.

The Tournament Management Committee voted to not accept any Division 1A tournament proposals until at least the 2025–26 academic year. If the MIAA Board of Directors votes to side with the TMC, then no Division 1A boys' ice hockey tournament would be held until 2026 at the earliest.

== History ==
The Super Eight was a double-elimination tournament that determined the high school state champion since the inaugural 1991 tournament. The tournament features 10 teams. The selection committee seeds the teams 1 to 10. The tournament begins with two play-in games culminating with the finals played at TD Garden. The games leading up to the finals have been scheduled at neutral sites, including Tsongas Center, Chelmsford Forum, and other rinks in the state. The tournament is the basis for the creation of the Division 1A Baseball Tournament, which was established in 2014, to crown a state champion.

On March 12, 2020, the MIAA announced that the state finals games across all divisions scheduled for that weekend would be canceled due to the COVID-19 pandemic. Thus, Arlington and Pope Francis were both declared co-champions for the first time in the Super Eight tournament. The MIAA did not sponsor winter tournaments in 2021, thus no Super Eight was held.

On April 16, 2021, the MIAA Tournament Management Committee voted to accept the Blue Ribbon Committee's proposal that they will “not consider any applications for a 1A Tournament until July 1, 2025, to ensure MIAA sport committees can support their applications with four years of data under the new statewide tournament structure starting in the fall 2021 season.” The Blue Ribbon Committee cited "consistency, equity, and Title IX compliance across all sports" as the reasoning. The MIAA Division 1A Boys' Ice Hockey Tournament along with the Division 1A Baseball Tournament cannot return until the 2025–26 academic year if the committee votes to approve. The TMC believes that the 4-year gap will allow sports committees to gather substantial data with the new statewide tournament to better support their future proposals for a Division 1A tournament. However, the Board of Directors must approve the TMC vote before it becomes official.

On April 29, the MIAA Ice Hockey Committee announced that they will appeal the decision made by the TMC.

=== Tournament format history ===
1991–2000
8 teams (double-elimination)

2000–2003
10 teams (4-team single-game play-in; double-elimination)

2004–2012
10 teams (4-team single-game play-in; round-robin; single-game semifinal and final)

2013–2017
10 teams (4-team single-game play-in; best-of-three quarterfinals; single-game semifinal and final)

2018–2021
10 teams (4-team single-game play-in; double-elimination with a single-game championship)

== Results ==
| Year | Winning team | Coach | Losing team | Coach | Score | Location | Finals venue |
|---|---|---|---|---|---|---|---|
| 1991 | Catholic Memorial | Bill Hanson | Boston College High | | 3–2 | Boston, Massachusetts | Boston Garden |
| 1992 | Catholic Memorial (2) | Bill Hanson | Matignon | | 3–1 | Boston, Massachusetts | Boston Garden |
| 1993 | Catholic Memorial (3) | Bill Hanson | Medford | | 5–2 | Boston, Massachusetts | Boston Garden |
| 1994 | Catholic Memorial (4) | Bill Hanson | Arlington Catholic | | 5–1 | Boston, Massachusetts | Boston Garden |
| 1995 | Catholic Memorial (5) | Bill Hanson | Boston College High | | 3–1 | Boston, Massachusetts | Boston Garden |
| 1996 | Boston College High | Joe McCabe | Matignon | | 5–1 | Boston, Massachusetts | FleetCenter |
| 1997 | Arlington Catholic | Dan Shine | Boston College High | Joe McCabe | 5–4 | Boston, Massachusetts | FleetCenter |
| 1998 | Catholic Memorial (6) | Bill Hanson | Archbishop Williams | | 5–0 | Boston, Massachusetts | FleetCenter |
| 1999 | Catholic Memorial (7) | Bill Hanson | Boston College High | Joe McCabe | 5–2 | Lowell, Massachusetts | Tsongas Center |
| 2000 | Catholic Memorial (8) | Bill Hanson | Boston College High | Joe McCabe | 6–3 | Boston, Massachusetts | FleetCenter |
| 2001 | Catholic Memorial (9) | Bill Hanson | Boston College High | Joe McCabe | 1–0 (OT) | Boston, Massachusetts | FleetCenter |
| 2002 | Boston College High (2) | Joe McCabe | Catholic Memorial | | 2–0 | Boston, Massachusetts | FleetCenter |
| 2003 | Catholic Memorial (10) | Bill Hanson | Boston College High | Joe McCabe | 3–2 | Boston, Massachusetts | FleetCenter |
| 2004 | Catholic Memorial (11) | Bill Hanson | Boston College High | Joe McCabe | 3–1 | Boston, Massachusetts | FleetCenter |
| 2005 | Catholic Memorial (12) | Bill Hanson | Arlington Catholic | | 3–1 | Boston, Massachusetts | TD Banknorth Garden |
| 2006 | Boston College High (3) | Joe McCabe | Catholic Memorial | | 2–1 | Boston, Massachusetts | TD Banknorth Garden |
| 2007 | Boston College High (4) | Joe McCabe | Weymouth | | 6–1 | Boston, Massachusetts | TD Banknorth Garden |
| 2008 | Reading | Peter Doherty | Malden Catholic | | 3–0 | Boston, Massachusetts | TD Banknorth Garden |
| 2009 | Catholic Memorial (13) | Bill Hanson | Burlington | Bob Conceison | 5–1 | Boston, Massachusetts | TD Banknorth Garden |
| 2010 | Hingham | Tony Messina | Catholic Memorial | | 1–0 | Boston, Massachusetts | TD Garden |
| 2011 | Malden Catholic | Chris Serino | St. John's Prep | | 4–3 (OT) | Boston, Massachusetts | TD Garden |
| 2012 | Malden Catholic (2) | John McLean | Boston College High | | 3–1 | Boston, Massachusetts | TD Garden |
| 2013 | Malden Catholic (3) | John McLean | Austin Prep | | 3–2 | Boston, Massachusetts | TD Garden |
| 2014 | Malden Catholic (4) | John McLean | Austin Prep | | 5–3 | Boston, Massachusetts | TD Garden |
| 2015 | St. John's Prep | Kris Hanson | Malden Catholic | John McLean | 2–1 | Boston, Massachusetts | TD Garden |
| 2016 | Malden Catholic (5) | John McLean | St. John's Prep | | 2–1 (OT) | Boston, Massachusetts | TD Garden |
| 2017 | Arlington | John Messuri | Central Catholic | | 2–1 (OT) | Boston, Massachusetts | TD Garden |
| 2018 | Boston College High (5) | John Flaherty | Pope Francis | Brian Foley | 2-1 (OT) | Boston, Massachusetts | TD Garden |
| 2019 | Boston College High (6) | John Flaherty | Pope Francis | Brian Foley | 2-1 (4OT) | Boston, Massachusetts | TD Garden |
| 2020 | Cancelled due to the COVID-19 pandemic; Arlington (2) and Pope Francis declared co-champions | | | | | | |
| 2021 | Cancelled due to the COVID-19 pandemic | | | | | | |

== Team titles ==
| Team | Titles | Years |
|---|---|---|
| Catholic Memorial | 13 | 1991, 1992, 1993, 1994, 1995, 1998, 1999, 2000, 2001, 2003, 2004, 2005, 2009 |
| Boston College High | 6 | 1996, 2002, 2006, 2007, 2018, 2019 |
| Malden Catholic | 5 | 2011, 2012, 2013, 2014, 2016 |
| Arlington | 2 | 2017, 2020 |
| Pope Francis | 1 | 2020 |
| St. John's Prep | 1 | 2015 |
| Arlington Catholic | 1 | 1997 |
| Reading Memorial | 1 | 2008 |
| Hingham | 1 | 2010 |

== Tournaments ==
=== 1991 ===
1. Catholic Memorial School ^
2. St. John's Preparatory School
3. Boston College High School
4. Matignon High School
5. Medford High School
6. Reading Memorial High School
7. Arlington High School
8. Billerica Memorial High School

^ Tournament Champion

=== 1992 ===
1. Catholic Memorial School ^
2. Matignon High School
3. Woburn Memorial High School
4. St. John's Preparatory School
5. Don Bosco Technical High School
6. Newton North High School
7. Reading Memorial High School
8. Arlington High School

^ Tournament Champion

=== 1993 ===
1. Catholic Memorial School ^
2. Medford High School
3. Archbishop Williams High School
4. Billerica Memorial High School
5. Arlington High School
6. St. John's High School
7. Burlington High School
8. Weymouth High School

^ Tournament Champion

=== 1994 ===
1. Catholic Memorial School ^
2. St. John's Preparatory School
3. Arlington High School
4. Arlington Catholic High School
5. Wakefield Memorial High School
6. Framingham High School
7. Matignon High School
8. Falmouth High School

^ Tournament Champion

=== 1995 ===
1. Catholic Memorial School ^
2. Boston College High School
3. Arlington Catholic High School
4. Arlington High School
5. Newton North High School
6. Reading Memorial High School
7. Matignon High School
8. Acton-Boxborough Regional High School

^ Tournament Champion

=== 1996 ===
1. Boston College High School ^
2. Catholic Memorial School
3. Matignon High School
4. Reading Memorial High School
5. Arlington Catholic High School
6. Arlington High School
7. Acton-Boxborough Regional High School
8. Tewksbury Memorial High School

^ Tournament Champion

=== 1997 ===
1. Catholic Memorial School
2. Matignon High School
3. Arlington Catholic High School ^
4. St. John's High School
5. Boston College High School
6. Reading Memorial High School
7. Billerica Memorial High School
8. Chelmsford High School

^ Tournament Champion

=== 1998 ===
1. Catholic Memorial School ^*
2. Archbishop Williams High School
3. Arlington High School
4. Boston College High School
5. Billerica Memorial High School
6. Reading Memorial High School
7. Arlington Catholic High School
8. St. John's Preparatory School

^ Tournament Champion

- Catholic Memorial School won the Super Eight tournament with a perfect 24-0-0 season record.

=== 1999 ===
1. Boston College High School
2. Reading Memorial High School
3. Archbishop Williams High School
4. Arlington High School
5. St. John's Preparatory School
6. Catholic Memorial School^
7. Matignon High School
8. Waltham High School

^ Tournament Champion

=== 2000 ===
1. Catholic Memorial School ^
2. Boston College High School
3. Arlington High School
4. Austin Preparatory School
5. Arlington Catholic High School
6. Reading Memorial High School
7. Needham High School
8. St. John's High School

^ Tournament Champion

=== 2001 ===
1. Winchester High School
2. Arlington High School
3. Catholic Memorial School^
4. Austin Preparatory School
5. Boston College High School
6. Reading Memorial High School
7. Springfield Cathedral High School
8. St. John's High School
9. Archbishop Williams High School
10. Matignon High School

^ Tournament Champion

=== 2002 ===
1. St. John's High School
2. Boston College High School^
3. Austin Preparatory School
4. Hingham High School
5. Catholic Memorial School
6. Billerica Memorial High School
7. Chelmsford High School
8. Reading Memorial High School
9. Arlington Catholic High School
10. Arlington High School

^ Tournament Champion

=== 2003 ===
1. Boston College High School
2. Catholic Memorial School^
3. Arlington High School
4. Hingham High School
5. Austin Preparatory School
6. Arlington Catholic High School
7. Belmont High School
8. Chelmsford High School
9. St. John's High School
10. St. John's Preparatory School

^ Tournament Champion

=== 2004 ===
1. Catholic Memorial School^
2. Boston College High School
3. Arlington Catholic High School
4. Hingham High School
5. Waltham High School
6. St. John's Preparatory School
7. Belmont High School
8. Duxbury High School
9. Billerica Memorial High School
10. Framingham High School

^ Tournament Champion

=== 2005 ===
1. Catholic Memorial School^
2. Boston College High School
3. Hingham High School
4. Waltham High School
5. Arlington Catholic High School
6. Reading Memorial High School
7. Duxbury High School
8. Medford High School
9. Austin Preparatory School
10. St. John's Preparatory School

^ Tournament Champion

=== 2006 ===
1. Catholic Memorial School
2. Boston College High School^
3. Arlington Catholic High School
4. Medford High School
5. Hingham High School
6. Duxbury High School
7. Winchester High School
8. Acton-Boxborough Regional High School
9. Austin Preparatory School
10. St. John's Preparatory School

^ Tournament Champion

=== 2007 ===
The ten teams to qualify for the 2007 Super Eight tournament are listed below.

1. Catholic Memorial School (14-1-2)
2. St. John's Preparatory School (11-3-6)
3. Boston College High School (14-4-2)
4. Malden Catholic High School (13-4-2)
5. Weymouth High School (19-1-0)
6. Reading Memorial High School (19-3-0)
7. Woburn Memorial High School (16-2-2)
8. Central Catholic High School (16-2-2)
9. Waltham High School (18-3-1)
10. Austin Preparatory School (13-5-2)

==== Bracket ====
Play-in
8 | Central Catholic Raiders | 3
9 | Waltham Hawks | 1
7 | Woburn Tanners | 0
10 | Austin Prep Cougars | 1

Bracket A

| Pos | Team | Pld | W | L | GF | GA | GD | Pts | Qualification | WEY | CM | CC | MC |
|---|---|---|---|---|---|---|---|---|---|---|---|---|---|
| 1 | Weymouth Wildcats | 3 | 3 | 0 | 10 | 5 | +5 | 6 | Advance to Semifinals | — | 2–1 | 5–2 | 3–2 |
| 2 | Catholic Memorial Knights | 3 | 2 | 1 | 16 | 4 | +12 | 4 | Advance to Semifinals | 1–2 | — | 10–1 | 5–1 |
| 3 | Central Catholic Raiders | 3 | 1 | 2 | 11 | 18 | −7 | 2 | | 2–5 | 1–10 | — | 8–3 |
| 4 | Malden Catholic Lancers | 3 | 0 | 3 | 6 | 16 | −10 | 0 | | 2–3 | 1–5 | 3–8 | — |

Bracket B

| Pos | Team | Pld | W | L | GF | GA | GD | Pts | Qualification | BCH | AP | SJP | RMHS |
|---|---|---|---|---|---|---|---|---|---|---|---|---|---|
| 1 | Boston College High Eagles | 3 | 3 | 0 | 15 | 5 | +10 | 6 | Advance to Semifinals | — | 7–0 | 3–1 | 5–4 |
| 2 | Austin Prep Cougars | 3 | 2 | 1 | 8 | 9 | −1 | 4 | Advance to Semifinals | 0–7 | — | 2–1 | 6–1 |
| 3 | St. John's Prep Eagles | 3 | 1 | 2 | 8 | 7 | +1 | 2 | | 1–3 | 1–2 | — | 6–2 |
| 4 | Reading Rockets | 3 | 0 | 3 | 7 | 17 | −10 | 0 | | 4–5 | 1–6 | 2–6 | — |

Semifinals and Finals

Semifinals
A1 | Weymouth Wildcats | 5
B2 | Austin Prep Cougars | 4
B1 | BC High Eagles | 1
A2 | Catholic Memorial Knights | 0

Championship
A1 | Weymouth Wildcats | 1
B1 | BC High Eagles | 6

=== 2008 ===
The ten teams to qualify for the 2008 Super Eight tournament are listed below.

1. Catholic Memorial School (14-1-3)
2. Hingham High School (17-3-2)
3. St. John's Preparatory School (12-5-3)
4. Boston College High School (11-4-5)
5. Reading Memorial High School (20-1-0)
6. Malden Catholic High School (11-5-4)
7. Needham High School (16-3-2)
8. Waltham High School (15-3-4)
9. Westford Academy (15-5-1)
10. Xaverian Brothers High School (10-6-3)

=== 2009 ===
The ten teams to qualify for the 2009 Super Eight tournament are listed below.

1. Catholic Memorial School (10-4-4)
2. Needham High School (18-3-1)
3. Malden Catholic High School (15-3-2)
4. Hingham High School (15-2-5)
5. Central Catholic High School (15-0-7)
6. Xaverian Brothers High School (14-4-2)
7. Burlington High School (17-2-1)
8. Winchester High School (16-3-1)
9. Springfield Cathedral High School (13-4-2)
10. Arlington Catholic High School (12-4-4)

=== 2010 ===
The ten teams to qualify for the 2010 Super Eight tournament are listed below.

1. Catholic Memorial School (14-3-1)
2. Austin Preparatory School (16-1-3)
3. Hingham High School (17-2-3)
4. Malden Catholic High School (13-3-4)
5. Needham High School (17-1-3)
6. Springfield Cathedral High School (15-2-5)
7. Xaverian Brothers High School (12-5-3)
8. Winchester High School (13-4-2)
9. Burlington High School (14-4-2)
10. Central Catholic High School (13-4-3)

=== 2011 ===
The ten teams to qualify for the 2011 Super Eight tournament are listed below.

1. Malden Catholic High School (16-2-2)
2. St. John's Preparatory School (14-5-1)
3. Boston College High School (13-4-3)
4. Weymouth High School (17-3-2)
5. Hingham High School (13-5-4)
6. Needham High School (12-6-4)
7. Woburn Memorial High School (17-3-1)
8. Central Catholic High School (16-5-1)
9. St. Mary's High School (13-4-3)
10. Springfield Cathedral High School (12-9-1)

=== 2012 ===
The ten teams to qualify for the 2012 Super Eight tournament are listed below.

1. Malden Catholic High School (15-1-4)
2. St. Mary's High School (18-0-3)
3. St. John's Preparatory School (13-5-2)
4. Hingham High School (16-4-2)
5. Boston College High School (10-5-5)
6. Springfield Cathedral High School (10-6-6)
7. Burlington High School (14-1-6)
8. Needham High School (16-4-1)
9. St. John's High School (15-4-3)
10. Central Catholic High School (12-3-5)

==== Bracket ====
Play-in; February 27 at Volpe Complex
8 | Needham Rockets | 4
9 | St. John's Pioneers | 5
7 | Burlington Red Devils | 4
10 | Central Catholic Raiders | 6

Bracket A

| Pos | Team | Pld | W | L | GF | GA | GD | Pts | Qualification | MC | BCH | HHS | SJHS |
|---|---|---|---|---|---|---|---|---|---|---|---|---|---|
| 1 | Malden Catholic Lancers | 3 | 3 | 0 | 13 | 5 | +8 | 6 | Advance to Semifinals | — | 3–1 | 7–2 | 3–2 |
| 2 | Boston College High Eagles | 3 | 2 | 1 | 8 | 7 | +1 | 4 | Advance to Semifinals | 1–3 | — | 4–2 | 3–2* |
| 3 | Hingham Harbormen | 3 | 1 | 2 | 7 | 13 | −6 | 2 | | 2–7 | 2–4 | — | 3–2* |
| 4 | St. John's Pioneers | 3 | 0 | 3 | 6 | 9 | −3 | 0 | | 2–3 | 2–3* | 2–3* | — |

Bracket B

| Pos | Team | Pld | W | L | GF | GA | GD | Pts | Qualification | SJP | CC | SMH | SCHS |
|---|---|---|---|---|---|---|---|---|---|---|---|---|---|
| 1 | St. John's Prep Eagles | 3 | 3 | 0 | 11 | 7 | +4 | 6 | Advance to Semifinals | — | 4–3 | 3–1 | 4–3* |
| 2 | Central Catholic Raiders | 3 | 2 | 1 | 14 | 13 | +1 | 4 | Advance to Semifinals | 3–4 | — | 6–5** | 5–4 |
| 3 | St. Mary's Spartans | 3 | 1 | 2 | 9 | 11 | −2 | 2 | | 1–3 | 5–6** | — | 3–2** |
| 4 | Springfield Cathedral Panthers | 3 | 0 | 3 | 9 | 12 | −3 | 0 | | 3–4* | 4–5* | 2–3** | — |

Semifinals and finals

Semifinals; March 14 at Volpe Complex
A1 | Malden Catholic Lancers | 4
B2 | Central Catholic Raiders | 0
B1 | St. John's Prep Eagles | 2
A2 | BC High Eagles | 3

Championship; March 18 at TD Garden
A1 | Malden Catholic Lancers | 3
A2 | BC High Eagles | 1

* indicates one overtime period
** indicates shootout

=== 2013 ===
The ten teams to qualify for the 2013 Super Eight tournament are listed below.

1. St. John's Preparatory School (17-2-1)
2. Springfield Cathedral High School (16-1-4)
3. Boston College High School (14-3-3)
4. Austin Preparatory School (13-1-6)
5. Reading Memorial High School (16-1-5)
6. Catholic Memorial School (12-6-2)
7. Archbishop Williams High School (12-4-4)
8. Central Catholic High School (13-5-3)
9. Hingham High School (13-7-2)
10. Malden Catholic High School (11-6-3)

==== Bracket ====
Play-in; February 25 at Stoneham Arena
8 | Central Catholic Raiders | 4*
9 | Hingham Harbormen | 3
7 | Archbishop Williams Bishops | 1
10 | Malden Catholic Lancers | 9

Quarterfinals; March 3 at Tsongas Center; March 6–10 at Stoneham Arena
1 | St. John's Prep Eagles | 1 | 3 | 4
8 | Central Catholic Raiders | 4 | 1 | 2
4 | Austin Prep Cougars | 2 | 1 | X
5 | Reading Rockets | 1 | 0 | X
3 | BC High Eagles | 3 | 2 | 2
6 | Catholic Memorial Knights | 1 | 3** | 3
2 | Cathedral Panthers | 2 | 0 | X
7 | Malden Catholic Lancers | 3 | 4 | X

Semifinals; March 13 at Tsongas Center
1 | St. John's Prep Eagles | 1
4 | Austin Prep Cougars | 2
3 | Catholic Memorial Knights | 3
7 | Malden Catholic Lancers | 5

Championship; March 17 at TD Garden
4 | Austin Prep Cougars | 2
7 | Malden Catholic Lancers | 3

=== 2014 ===
The ten teams to qualify for the 2014 Super Eight tournament are listed below.

1. Boston College High School (14-2-4)
2. Malden Catholic High School (16-4-0)
3. Springfield Cathedral High School (15-2-5)
4. Austin Preparatory School (13-4-4)
5. Central Catholic High School (16-3-3)
6. Duxbury High School (16-2-3)
7. Braintree High School (13-4-3)
8. Xaverian Brothers High School (11-3-6)
9. Archbishop Williams High School (12-5-3)
10. Catholic Memorial School (9-7-4)

==== Bracket ====
Play-in; February 24 at Ryan Arena
8 | Xaverian Hawks | 6**
9 | Archbishop Williams Bishops | 5
7 | Braintree Wamps | 1
10 | Catholic Memorial Knights | 2

Quarterfinals; March 2 at TD Garden; March 5–6 at Tsongas Center
1 | BC High Eagles | 2 | 4 | X
8 | Xaverian Hawks | 1 | 0 | X
4 | Austin Prep Cougars | 2 | 4 | X
5 | Central Catholic Raiders | 1 | 1 | X
3 | Cathedral Panthers | 4 | 6 | X
6 | Duxbury Dragons | 1 | 3 | X
2 | Malden Catholic Lancers | 4 | 6 | X
7 | Catholic Memorial Knights | 3 | 4 | X

Semifinals; March 13 at Conte Forum
1 | BC High Eagles | 1
4 | Austin Prep Cougars | 2***
3 | Cathedral Panthers | 1
2 | Malden Catholic Lancers | 3

Championship; March 16 at TD Garden
4 | Austin Prep Cougars | 3
2 | Malden Catholic Lancers | 5

=== 2015 ===
The ten teams to qualify for the 2015 Super Eight tournament are listed below.

1. Springfield Cathedral High School (20-0-2)
2. Malden Catholic High School (16-1-2)
3. Austin Preparatory School (19-1-1)
4. Boston College High School (13-5-2)
5. St. John's Preparatory School (14-5-1)
6. Central Catholic High School (15-5-2)
7. Franklin High School (Massachusetts) (16-1-3)
8. Woburn Memorial High School (15-1-4)
9. Burlington High School (16-1-4)
10. Xaverian Brothers High School (11-3-6)

==== Bracket ====
Play-in; February 24 at Chelmsford Forum
8 | Woburn Tanners | 5
9 | Burlington Red Devils | 2
7 | Franklin Panthers | 3*
10 | Xaverian Hawks | 2

Quarterfinals; March 1–5 at Tsongas Center; March 8 at O'Brien Rink
1 | Cathedral Panthers | 3 | 5 | X
8 | Woburn Tanners | 2 | 0 | X
4 | BC High Eagles | 1 | 2 | X
5 | St. John's Prep Eagles | 2 | 5 | X
3 | Austin Prep Cougars | 3 | 4 | 2
6 | Central Catholic Raiders | 0 | 7 | 1
2 | Malden Catholic Lancers | 2 | 5 | X
7 | Franklin Panthers | 1 | 0 | X

Semifinals; March 11 at Conte Forum
1 | Cathedral Panthers | 3
5 | St. John's Prep Eagles | 4*
3 | Austin Prep Cougars | 3
2 | Malden Catholic Lancers | 6

Championship; March 15 at TD Garden
5 | St. John's Prep Eagles | 2
2 | Malden Catholic Lancers | 1

=== 2016 ===
The ten teams to qualify for the 2016 Super Eight tournament are listed below.

1. Boston College High School (17-0-3)
2. Pope Francis High School (15-3-2)
3. Malden Catholic High School (14-3-3)
4. St. John's Preparatory School (14-2-4)
5. Burlington High School (17-1-3)
6. Austin Preparatory School (13-4-3)
7. Arlington High School (15-3-3)
8. Reading Memorial High School (12-2-6
9. Central Catholic High School (14-7-1)
10. Hingham High School (11-8-3)

==== Bracket ====
Play-in; February 29 at Chelmsford Forum
8 | Reading Rockets | 3
9 | Central Catholic Raiders | 4**
7 | Arlington Spy Ponders | 2
10 | Hingham Harbormen | 4

Quarterfinals; March 6–10 at Tsongas Center; March 12 at Chelmsford Forum
1 | BC High Eagles | 3 | 2 | 5
8 | Central Catholic Raiders | 4 | 1 | 3
4 | St. John's Prep Eagles | 6 | 5 | X
5 | Burlington Red Devils | 1 | 4** | X
3 | Malden Catholic Lancers | 1 | 4 | 4
6 | Austin Prep Cougars | 2 | 1 | 0
2 | Pope Francis Cardinals | 8 | 2 | X
10 | Hingham Harbormen | 1 | 0 | X

Semifinals; March 16 at Tsongas Center
1 | BC High Eagles | 3
4 | St. John's Prep Eagles | 5
3 | Malden Catholic Lancers | 3
2 | Pope Francis Cardinals | 1

Championship; March 20 at TD Garden
3 | Malden Catholic Lancers | 2
4 | St. John's Prep Eagles | 1
