= Tewksbury Memorial High School =

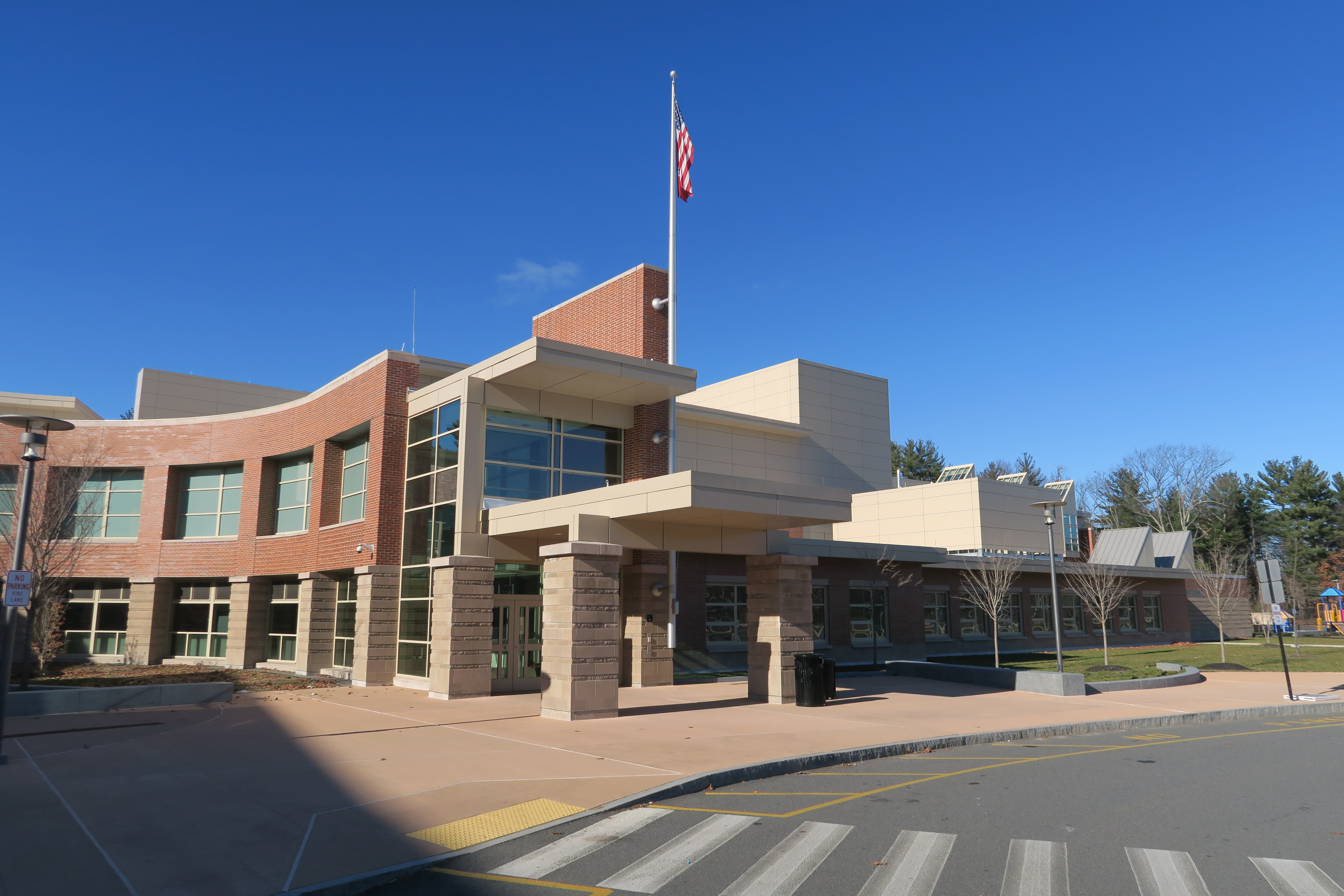
- Tewksbury Memorial High School

Location
- 320 Pleasant Street; Tewksbury, Massachusetts 01876; United States; 42°36′09″N 71°14′25″W

Information
- Type: Public
- Motto: We rise at TMHS!
- School district: Tewksbury Public Schools
- Superintendent: Brenda Theriault-Regan
- CEEB code: 222130
- Principal: Andrew J Long
- Teaching staff: 61.95 (on FTE basis)
- Grades: 9 to 12
- Gender: Coeducational
- Enrollment: 719 (2023–2024)
- Student to teacher ratio: 11.61
- Colors: Scarlet, white, and royal blue
- Athletics conference: Merrimack Valley Conference (MVC)
- Mascot: Native American
- Nickname: TMHS
- Team name: Redmen
- Rival: Wilmington High School (Wilmington, Massachusetts)
- Newspaper: Tewksbury Tribune
- Website: TMHS website

Tewksbury Memorial High School (also TMHS or Tewksbury High School) is a suburban public high school located at 320 Pleasant Street in Tewksbury, Massachusetts, United States. Serving grades 9–12, it is the only public high school in the town. Its total enrollment for the 2024–2025 school year was 696 students.

== Demographics ==
According to Massachusetts Department of Elementary and Secondary Education annual statistics, for the 2024–2025 academic year, the demographic enrollment distributions for race, gender and grade level at Tewksbury Memorial High School are as follows:

Total number of enrolled students: 696
Total number of full-time equivalent educators: 56.9
Therefore, the student to teacher ratio for this school is 12.2:1

Enrollment by Race/Ethnicity (2024–2025)
Race	Enrolled Pupils*	% of District
African American	47	6.8%
Asian	35	5.0%
Hispanic	68	9.8%
Native American	0	0.0%
White	533	76.6%
Native Hawaiian, Pacific Islander	0	0%
Multi-Race, Non-Hispanic	12	1.7%
Total	696	100%

* Approximate number of enrolled pupils is calculated based on total number of students in district, multiplied by reported percentage, and rounded to nearest whole student.

Enrollment by gender (2024–2025)
Gender	Enrolled pupils	Percentage
Female	355	51.01%
Male	340	48.85%
Non-binary	1	0.14%
Total	696	100%

Enrollment by Grade
Grade	Pupils Enrolled	Percentage
9	160	22.99%
10	169	24.28%
11	190	27.3%
12	173	24.86%
SP*	4	0.57%
Total	696	100%

* SP = Special Education Beyond Grade 12

== Athletics ==
The Redmen are a member of the Merrimack Valley Conference. The MIAA classifies them as a Division 2 school for most sports. Significant rivals include conference foes Andover, Billerica, Central Catholic, and Chelmsford. Their biggest rival is neighboring Wilmington of the Middlesex League, whom the football team plays every Thanksgiving.

In 2013, the football team went undefeated at 13-0 and won the Division 3 State Championship, defeating Plymouth South by a score of 42–14.

Other than their football team, TMHS's boys' soccer team, field hockey team, track, and XC team has seen recent success.

- Football State Champions - 1985, 1996, 2013
- Football State Finalists - 1981, 1990, 1995, 2011, 2025

The high school's esports team has won the MSAA state championship in Rocket League five of the last eight seasons. The team completed a dominant 12-0 undefeated season in Fall 2024, defeating Shrewsbury to claim their fifth overall esports championship and earning recognition from the Tewksbury School Committee. Peter Impink (Class of 2024), Toffy Beyloune (Class of 2025), and Santiago Avendano (Class of 2027) were most involved during their times with Tewksbury esports. Graduated Captain Peter Impink led the way for his team as they picked up multiple state championships with him on their side.

== Construction of new school building in 2012 ==
The school was placed on warning status by the New England Association of Schools and Colleges (NEASC) in 2006. In 2010 the town voted to build a new high school next to the old one to address structural issues leading to the institution of this warning status.

The new school cost $68 million and opened in August 2012. The gymnasium seats 1,225 fans, featuring one main basketball court and three intermediate courts that can be separated for tournament or recreational league use. The gym is used for all future TMHS graduations. The auditorium/theater features seating for 690 and the stage has a backstage area for work on theatrical productions. Some of the more distinguishing characteristics of the complex include airport style restrooms for students, shared prep areas behind science and art classrooms, a TV studio, and two large rooms that can accommodate three or four classes meeting together. The entire complex features copious amounts of glass for maximum natural lighting. This ties in with numerous green features that add to the energy efficiency of the school and guarantee an additional reimbursement from the state. Freshman Orientation was on August 27, 2012, and the first official day of school in the new building was on August 28, 2012. As of September 2012, the new high school was finally complete, though the exterior features including the parking lot and track and field were delayed for a while longer. Demolition for the old high school began in mid-August 2012 and finished well into 2013.
