= Sean Furey =

American javelin thrower

Personal information
- Nationality: United States
- Born: August 31, 1982 (age 43)
- Height: 6 ft 2 in (188 cm)
- Weight: 194 lb (88 kg)

Sport
- Sport: Track and field
- Event: Javelin throw
- Coached by: Todd Reich

Achievements and titles
- Personal best: Javelin: 83.08m

Sean Furey (born August 31, 1982) is an American Olympic javelin thrower. He has placed in the top three at the U.S. National Championships six times, winning the javelin event in 2010, 2014 and 2015. He represented the United States in international competition between 2009 and 2016, including 2 Olympic (2012, 2016), 2 World Championship (2009, 2015) and 2 Pan American (2011, 2015) teams. In 2009, at the World Championships in Berlin, Germany, Sean qualified for the final with a season best throw and ultimately finished 12th. His personal best is 83.08 meters (272 feet, 7 inches)

== Early life ==
Furey was born August 31, 1982, to Kathy Furey (who later became Kathy Stupak by marriage). He grew up in Methuen, Massachusetts, with his younger brother Ryan and began throwing the javelin while at Methuen High School. He won two state javelin championships and in 2000, won the National Scholastic Championship. During his senior season, Furey led his school to the Merrimack Valley Conference title and was named to the All-Scholastic team by the Boston Herald. He graduated from Methuen in 2000. Furey also played on the school's football team.

After high school, Furey attended Dartmouth. He graduated in 2005 with a 3.80 GPA and an engineering degree.

== Athletic career ==
At Dartmouth, Furey set the school record in javelin, with a distance of 242-foot-3-inch (73.84 m). In 2005, he won the Ivy League championship and was named the "Scholar Athlete of the Year" by the U.S. Track & Field and Cross Country Coaches Association. At the 2005 NCAA Outdoor Championships, he placed third with a throw of 73.83 metres (242.2 ft).

After college, Furey moved to San Diego to train. At the 2008 Olympic Trials, he placed seventh. In 2009, he placed third in the National Championships and qualified for Worlds with a throw of 76.16 metres (249.9 ft). At the World Championships, he was in fifth place among the "B" group after the qualification round of the javelin throw. However, he did not match that success in the final and finished in 12th place out of 12 competitors that made the final.

Furey won the 2010 National Championships with a throw of 79.86 metres (262.0 ft). In 2011, he finished in second place, recording a distance of 77.99 metres (255.9 ft). At the 2011 Pan American Games, Furey placed fourth.

At the 2012 Olympic Trials, Furey was battling a back injury. He placed fourth, throwing the javelin 77.86 metres (255.4 ft). Two weeks prior to the Trials, he had met the Olympic "A" Standard of 82.00 metres (269.03 ft) by throwing a new personal best 82.73 metres (271.4 ft) in Lisle, Illinois. First and second place did not make the make standard, allowing Furey and fifth-place finisher Cyrus Hostetler to make the Olympic team. After the meet, he remarked "It's mixed emotions, fourth place vs. the Olympic team ... It's bittersweet. I just didn't execute like I needed."

Furey entered the 2012 Olympics with the longest throw by an American in 2012, and was ranked number 16 in the world. He competed in the "B" group preliminary round of the javelin throw on August 8. He placed 18th in his group and 37th overall and did not advance to the finals.

Furey is coached by former Olympian Todd Reich and sponsored by Mizuno. "Todd is a talented guy," says Furey. "He knows what the elite javelin throwers are doing." Furey says he has no plans to retire anytime soon. "I won't quit until my arm falls off," he said.

== Personal life ==
Furey currently lives in San Diego, California with his wife Matthan "Mattie" Chatterton-Richmond. He works part-time at Raytheon as a mechanical engineer doing what he describes as "bomb-proofing electronics" for the United States Navy. When asked why he chose to continue pursuing the javelin, instead of concentrating on his higher paying engineering career, Furey remarked "Missing out on money, I don't care. We have everything we need and more. Making money won't make me happier. Being on the Olympic team will make me happier."

== Competition record ==
Year	Competition	Venue	Position	Event	Notes
Representing the United States
2009	World Championships	Berlin, Germany	12th	Javelin	74.51m
2012	2012 London Olympics	London, United Kingdom	37th	Javelin	72.81m
2014	Pan American Sports Festival	Mexico City, Mexico	3rd	Javelin	77.23m A
2015	Pan American Games	Toronto, Canada	5th	Javelin	77.41 m
2015	World Championships	Beijing, China	29th (q)	Javelin	75.01 m
2016	Olympic Games	Rio de Janeiro, Brazil	35th (q)	Javelin	72.61 m

== Seasonal bests by year ==
- 2000 – 69.27
- 2001 – 62.09
- 2003 – 70.83
- 2004 – 73.18
- 2005 – 73.83
- 2006 – 73.43
- 2007 – 74.10
- 2008 – 80.45
- 2009 – 79.28
- 2010 – 79.91
- 2011 – 81.62
- 2012 – 82.73
- 2013 – 80.04
- 2014 – 81.24
- 2015 – 83.08
- 2016 – 76.26
