= Ganley =

Ganley is a surname. Notable people with the surname include:

- Allan Ganley (1931–2008), English jazz drummer
- Bernard Ganley (1927–2009), English rugby league player
- Bob Ganley (1875–1945), American baseball player
- Bob Ganley (city administrator) (1949–2000), American city manager
- Caroline Ganley (1879–1966), English Labour Party politician
- Declan Ganley (b. 1968), British-born Irish entrepreneur
- Howden Ganley (b. 1941), former New Zealand racing driver
- Len Ganley (1943–2011), retired Northern Irish snooker referee
