= Middlesex League =

High school athletic teams in Massachusetts

- Founded: 1903
- No. of teams: 12

The Middlesex League is a high school athletic conference in District 4 of the Massachusetts Interscholastic Athletic Association.

The conference consists only of schools from the Middlesex County, hence the name.

Middlesex League

The league was founded in 1903 for baseball, by schools Andover High School, Reading Memorial High School, Saugus High School, Stoneham High School, and Woburn Memorial High School.

== History ==
Peabody Veterans Memorial High School joined in 1906, with Andover and Reading leaving the following year. In 1912, Wakefield High School joined, replacing the recently departed Saugus. In 1914, Reading returned to the league.

Following the 1914 season, Woburn would sue the Middlesex league after a controversy following their final game against Stoneham at home. Woburn won the game, and therefore won the league, but the following day, the Stoneham players returned to the diamond and measured the distance from home plate to the mound, deeming it 6–8 feet greater than what the rules stated. However, both the batter and pitcher's plates were not in the ground at the time, and they used spike holes to determine where they would be located. Ignoring the bylaw that "any protest to be valid shall be made in writing and duly signed during the progress of the game," the league voted that the game be played again. Woburn obviously declined, and in October when the committee met in preparation of the 1915 season, they purposely left out Woburn.

The 20's had a lot of movement from teams leaving and joining the league. Arlington High School joined in 1920, but would be gone the following year In 1921, Belmont and Lexington joined, replacing Wakefiled and Peabody The Middlesex League began sponsoring basketball in 1925. Winchester joined the same year, leaving the Suburban League. However it would only play basketball in the Middlesex, and would continue with other sports in the Mystic Valley league. Wakefield rejoined as a basketball only member in 1928.

In 1931, the league began sponsoring football, welcoming newcomers Concord High School and Maynard High School. They joined Belmont, Lexington, Reading, Stoneham, and Winchester (who completely left the Mystic Valley), with Reading being the only school not to play football. Concord and Maynard would not participate in Basketball.

The 1940 season became the final season for football in the league as Concord withdrew. Maynard left after 1943, deciding to only participate in the Midland League, and Concord found themselves returning to replace Maynard.

Melrose High School became the newest member in almost 15 years when they joined at the beginning of 1945 as a basketball-only member. However, a year later the league would open up baseball to both them and Wakefield, bringing the league to eight full members. Football in the Middlesex league returned in 1956, with all eight teams participating.

Woburn returned to the conference after over fifty years, leaving the Northeastern Conference at the end of 1968. Watertown High School would join a year later in 1970. In 1972 Concord-Carlisle left for the Dual County League, coincidentally, Maynard joined the DCL the same year, leaving the Midland League. Replacing Concord would be Burlington High School, leaving the Merrimack Valley Conference.

In 2009, the league split into a large and small divisions, following Watertown's choice to be independent for a couple seasons. Finally in 2011, Wilmington High School left the Cape Ann League, and Arlington left the Dual County, joining the Middlesex League starting in the fall.

== Member Schools ==
School	Location	Mascot	Colors	Joined League	Year Founded	Enrollment
Arlington High School	Arlington, Massachusetts	Spy Ponders	Maroon, Gray, & White	2011	1922	1,757
Belmont High School	Belmont, Massachusetts	Marauders	Maroon & Blue	1921	1865	1,498
Burlington High School	Burlington, Massachusetts	Red Devils	Red, White, & Blue	1972	1939	1,000
Lexington High School	Lexington, Massachusetts	Minutemen	Blue & Gold	1921	1854	2,348
Melrose High School	Melrose, Massachusetts	Red Hawk	Red & White	1921	1868	1,004
Reading Memorial High School	Reading, Massachusetts	Rockets	Red & Black	1903-1907, 1914-present	1954	1,066
Stoneham High School	Stoneham, Massachusetts	Spartans	Blue & White	1903		598
Wakefield Memorial High School	Wakefield, Massachusetts	Warriors	Red, White, & Silver	1912-1921, 1928-present		871
Watertown High School	Watertown, Massachusetts	Raiders	Red & Black	1970	1925	728
Wilmington High School	Wilmington, Massachusetts	Wildcats	Blue & White	2011		633
Winchester High School	Winchester, Massachusetts	Red & Black	Red & Black	1925	1850	1,418
Woburn Memorial High School	Woburn, Massachusetts	Bulls	Black & Orange	1903-1914, 1969-present	1852	1,203

== Former Members ==
School	Location	Mascot	Colors	Years in League	Current League
Andover High School	Andover, Massachusetts	Golden Warriors	Navy Blue & Gold	1903-1907	Merrimack Valley Conference
Concord-Carlisle High School	Concord, Massachusetts	Patriots	Maroon & White	1931-1940, 1943-1972	Dual County League
Maynard High School	Maynard, Massachusetts	Tiger	Orange & Black	1931-1943	Midland Wachusett League
Peabody Veterans Memorial High School	Peabody, Massachusetts	Tanners	Blue & White	1906-1921	Northeastern Conference
Saugus Middle-High School	Saugus, Massachusetts	Sachems	Red & White	1903-1912	Northeastern Conference

== State Championships ==
This is a list of state championships won by schools while a part of the Middlesex League

=== Football ===
Note: From 1972 to 2012, football state championships were separated by region, so there would be multiple champions from each division. From 1972 to 1977 and from 1997 to 2008, it was split between Eastern Mass and Central/Western Mass and there would be two champions in each division. From 1978 to 1996 and from 2009 to 2012 Central and Western Mass split so there would be three champions in each division. In 2013 everything was combined and therefore only allowed one state champion per division.

- Melrose - 2017, 2019 D4
- Reading Memorial - 1994, 1996, 1998 D2A Eastern; 2000 D2C Eastern; 2009, 2012 D2 Eastern
- Stoneham - 2018 D6
- Wakefield Memorial - 1999 D2B Eastern; 2022 D3
- Winchester - 1986 D1 Eastern; 1990 D2 Eastern
- Woburn Memorial - 1975, 1979 D1 Eastern; 2005 D1A Eastern

=== Cross Country ===
==== Boys ====
- Wakefield Memorial - 1972 D1; 2021, 2022 D2

==== Girls ====
- Lexington - 2001, 2016, 2025 D1
- Wakefield Memorial - 2023 D2

=== Field Hockey ===
- Reading Memorial - 2023 D2
- Watertown - 1986, 1988-1990, 1992, 1994, 1997, 2001, 2002, 2990-2017 D1; 2021-2024 D3

=== Fall Volleyball ===
- Melrose - 2012 D2

=== Soccer ===
==== Boys ====
- Lexington - 2016 D1
- Stoneham - 2004 D3; 2005 D2
- Wakefield Memorial - 1989 D1; 1997 D2
- Winchester - 1986, 1987, 2019 D2
- Woburn Memorial - 2000 D2

==== Girls ====
- Belmont - 1984 D2
- Winchester - 1983, 1986, 1990, 1995, 1997, 1998 (Co-Champs with Springfield Cathedral High School), 2002 D1; 2018 D2

=== Fall Golf ===
- Winchester - 2019 D2
- Woburn Memorial - 1999, 2000, 2002 D2

=== Fall Swim & Dive ===
==== Girls ====
- Reading Memorial - 2010, 2016-2018 D2

=== Basketball ===
==== Boys ====
- Belmont - 1948, 1958 Class B; 1993 D2
- Concord-Carlisle - 1964 Class B
- Lexington - 1943, 1971 Class B; 1972, 1978 D1
- Melrose - 1966, 1967 Class B
- Wakefield Memorial - 1965 Class B; 1997 D2
- Watertown - 2007, 2009, 2010 D3
- Winchester - 1952, 1954, 1955 Class B

==== Girls ====
- Reading Memorial - 2012 D2
- Wakefield Memorial - 1988, 1997 D2

=== Indoor Track & Field ===
==== Boys ====
- Belmont - 1955, 1993 Class C; 1959-1961, 1963 Class B
- Concord-Carlisle - 1948, 1951-1954, 1956-1960 Class D
- Lexington - 1970, 1976 Class A; 2006, 2007, 2015, 2016 D1
- Melrose - 1966, 1968, 1969 Class B
- Reading Memorial - 1975, 1987-1981, 1993, 1996, 1997 Class B; 1981, 1982 Class C; 2003, 2013 D2; 2026 D3
- Stoneham - 1971, 1992, 1994 Class C
- Wakefield Memorial - 1967 Class B; 2024, 2026 D4
- Winchester - 1984 Class C
- Woburn Memorial - 1999 Class B; 2008 D2

==== Girls ====
- Burlington - 2022 D3
- Lexington - 1986, 1989-1991 Class A; 2026 D1
- Reading Memorial - 1983, 1995-1997, 2000, 2001 Class B; 2013 D2
- Stoneham - 2007 D3
- Woburn Memorial - 1987 Class A

=== Ice Hockey ===
==== Boys ====
- Burlington - 2012, 2013 D1
- Melrose - 1950, 1962 All-State
- Reading Memorial - 2008 D1A; 2014 D1
- Watertown - 2015 D3
- Wilmington - 2012, 2013 D2
- Winchester - 1955 All-State; 1998, 2000 D1

==== Girls ====
- Reading Memorial - 2015 D1
- Winchester - 2010 D2
- Woburn Memorial - 2003 D2; 2004, 2006, 2017, 2018 D1

=== Wrestling ===
==== Boys ====
- Melrose - 2017, 2022 D3
- Winchester - 1995 D2; 2007, 2008 D3
- Woburn Memorial - 2001 D2

=== Baseball ===
- Reading Memorial - 1996 D2
- Stoneham - 1995 D2

=== Softball ===
- Burlington - 2023 D2
- Lexington - 1976, 2008, 2009 D1
- Reading Memorial - 1986, 2001 D1

=== Outdoor Track & Field ===
==== Boys ====
- Belmont - 1941, 1957, 1959, 1961 Class B; 1948-1950, 1953-1956 Class C; 1972 All-State
- Burlington - 2023 D4
- Concord-Carlisle - 1952, 1956, 1957, 1959, 1960 Class D; 1954 Class B
- Lexington - 1937, 1960 Class B; 1994, 2007 All-State; 2023 D1
- Melrose - 1944 Class B; 1967, 1969 All-State
- Reading Memorial - 1975 All-State
- Wakefield Memorial - 2022 D3; 2025 D4
- Winchester - 1948 Class D

==== Girls ====
- Lexington - 1987 All-State; 2025, 2026 D1
- Reading Memorial - 1996 All-State
- Stoneham - 1999 D2
- Wilmington - 2022 D4
- Woburn Memorial - 2014 All-State

=== Lacrosse ===
==== Boys ====
- Reading Memorial - 2018, 2023 D2
- Winchester - 1971, 1999 All-State; 2000 D1; 2019 D2

==== Girls ====
- Winchester - 2008 D2

=== Tennis ===
==== Boys ====
- Lexington - 1985, 2014, 2023 D1
- Winchester - 1977 Class A; 1981 D1; 2003-2009, 2011 D2; 2016, 2018 EMass D2

==== Girls ====
- Lexington - 1975 All-State; 2000, 2022, 2023 D1
- Winchester - 1979 All-State; 1983, 1996-1999 D1; 2007-2011 D2

=== Rugby ===
==== Boys ====
- Belmont - 2019, 2022, 2023 D1

==== Girls ====
- Belmont - 2017-2019, 2022-2026
