= Mark Buben =

American football player (born 1957)

No. 63, 65, 74, 75
- Position: Defensive end

Personal information
- Born: March 23, 1957; Geneva, New York, U.S.
- Died: September 6, 2022 (aged 65)
- Listed height: 6 ft 3 in (1.91 m)
- Listed weight: 260 lb (118 kg)

Career information
- High school: Methuen (MA)
- College: Tufts
- NFL draft: 1979: undrafted

Career history
- New England Patriots (1979–1981); Cleveland Browns (1982); Chicago Blitz (1983); Arizona Wranglers (1984); Arizona Outlaws (1985); Denver Gold (1985)

Career NFL statistics
- Fumble recoveries: 2
- Interceptions: 1
- Stats at Pro Football Reference

Mark Buben (March 23, 1957 – September 6, 2022) was an American professional football defensive end, who played American football at the collegiate level for Tufts University. During his professional career he played for the New England Patriots in 1979 and 1981 and for the Cleveland Browns in 1982.
