= Lance Wilder =

American animator

- Born: Lance Wilder; May 7, 1968 (age 58); Lowell, Massachusetts, United States
- Education: Chelmsford High School
- Alma mater: Rhode Island School of Design
- Occupation: Animator

Lance Wilder (born 1968) is an American animator and longtime background designer on The Simpsons, joining during the show's second season and having done work on roughly 600 episodes. He also served as background design supervisor from 1993 to 2003]. His other credits as a background designer include The Critic, Mission Hill, King of the Hill, Duckman, and Rugrats.

== Biography ==
Wilder was born in Lowell, Massachusetts and raised in the nearby town of Chelmsford and graduated from Chelmsford High School in 1986. Various landmarks from the area where he grew up were later incorporated into his design work on The Simpsons, such as the Springfield Town Hall, which directly takes its design from the Chelmsford Public Library.

He is an alumnus of the Rhode Island School of Design. After graduating in 1990, he moved to Los Angeles and was hired as a background designer for The Simpsons immediately despite no previous experience in animation, with his first assignment being "The Raven" segment of the original "Treehouse of Horror" episode. Wilder was responsible for the infamous "Squirrel House" design from "Treehouse of Horror V", which took him several days to draw only to be cut from the final episode. He was also featured in the 2000 BBC documentary The Simpsons: America's First Family. He received an Annie Award nomination in 2013.

== Filmography ==
Year	Title	Role	Notes
1990–present	The Simpsons	Background designer (417 episodes); Background design supervisor (255 episodes); Animator (1 episode)	
1990	Bart Simpson: Do The Bartman	Background designer	Music video
1991	Rugrats	Background layout artist (5 episodes)	
1994	Duckman	Background designer (1 episode)	
1994	The Critic	Background designer (7 episodes)	
1996	Quack Pack	Key background stylist (2 episodes background artist (1 episode)	
1997	King of the Hill	Background designer (1 episode)	
1998-2000	Histeria!	Background designer (17 episodes)	
2000-2002	Mission Hill	Background designer (8 episodes)	
