= Methuen High School =

Coordinates: 42°43′49.65″N 71°10′21.53″W

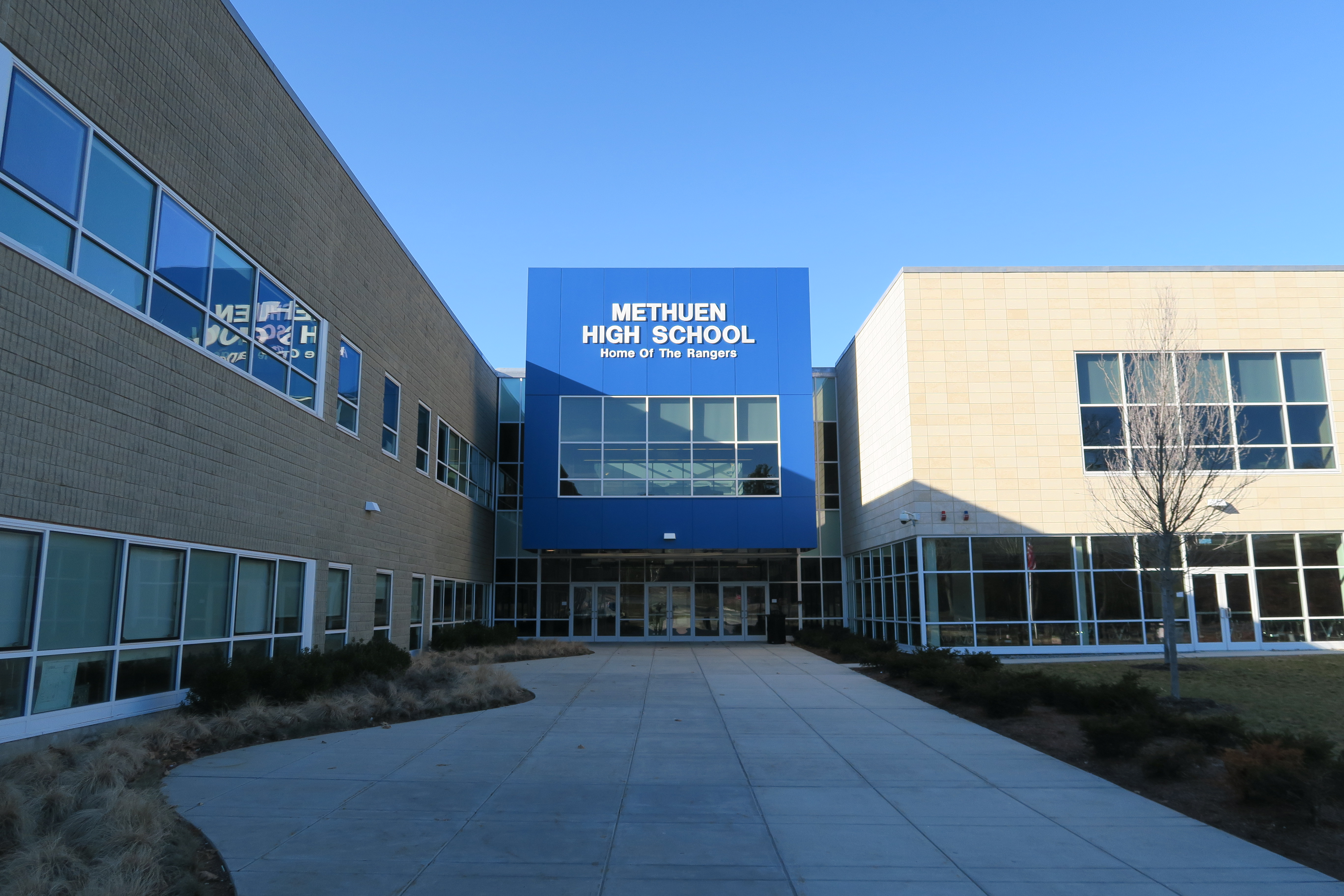
- Methuen High School

Location
- 1 Ranger Road; Methuen, MA 01844; United States

Information
- Type: Public
- Motto: Ranger Pride
- Principal: Anthony Curet (interim)
- Teaching staff: 149.31 (FTE)
- Grades: 9-12
- Enrollment: 1,898 (2023-2024)
- Student to teacher ratio: 12.71
- Campus type: Suburban
- Colors: Blue & White
- Athletics conference: Merrimack Valley Conference (MVC)
- Mascot: Rangers
- Team name: Methuen Rangers

Methuen High School is a public secondary school located in the city of Methuen, Massachusetts, United States. Methuen High serves grades nine through twelve for about 1,900 students. It is one of five public schools in Methuen and it is the only high school in the district.

== Environment ==
Methuen High School first opened in 1975. The school was originally designed with the open classroom theory. Since then, a $100 million renovation has been conducted and all classrooms now have walls. Also due in part to the renovation, students now receive iPads which they keep for the entire year. This is known as the 1:1 iPad program. The renovation also includes an expansion, which includes a brand new cafeteria, auditorium, fine arts area, lobby, and media center.

== Demographics ==
According to the Massachusetts Department of Higher Education, the school has 1,898 current enrollments. By gender, 999 are male, 896 are female, and 3 are non-binary. By race, 6.3% are African American, 50.2% are Hispanic or Latino, 37.7% White 4.0% Asian, and 1.9% are multi-race/non-hispanic.

== Athletics ==
Methuen High is a member of the Merrimack Valley Athletic Conference. The school offers 25 sports at the Varsity, Junior Varsity, and Freshmen levels. For boys: football, soccer, cross country, golf, basketball, indoor track, ice hockey, wrestling, tennis, volleyball, baseball, outdoor track, and lacrosse. For girls: field hockey, soccer, cross country, volleyball, swimming & diving, cheerleading, gymnastics, basketball, indoor track, tennis, outdoor track, and softball. Methuen teams play as the Rangers, inspired by Methuen native Robert Rogers and his foundation of Rogers' Rangers, which eventually led to the formation of the United States Army Rangers. Methuen High School also has a marching band which competes in the NESBA conference, as well as a JROTC battalion.

== Notable alumni ==
- Steve Bedrosian, former MLB pitcher for the Atlanta Braves, Philadelphia Phillies, San Francisco Giants
- Susie Castillo, Miss USA 2003, MTV VJ
- Amanda Conway, professional ice hockey player with the Connecticut Whale
- Ben Cosgrove, composer and multi-instrumentalist
- Sean Furey, two-time United States Olympic Team member (2012, 2016) - Javelin
- Calvin Kattar, professional Mixed Martial Artist, current UFC Featherweight
- Gary McLain, former Villanova men's basketball player
- Mark Buben, former New England Patriot DE 1979-1981 and Cleveland Brown 1982 NT
- Diana DiZoglio, Current State Auditor, former state representative and state senator
