= North Andover High School =

Coordinates: 42°42′3″N 71°6′59″W

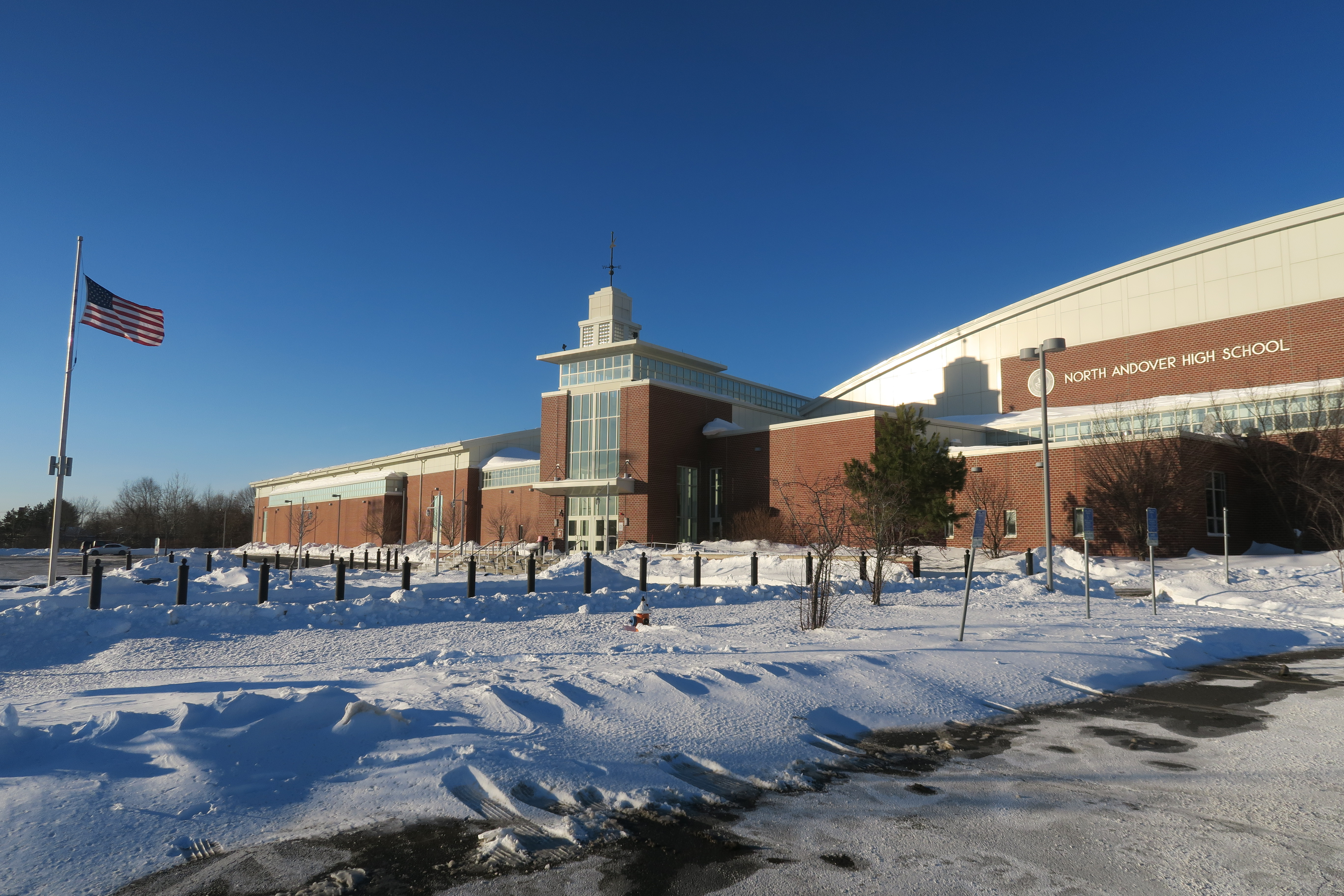
- North Andover High School
- 430 Osgood Street; North Andover, MA 01845; United States

Information
- Type: Public
- School district: North Andover Public Schools
- NCES District ID: 25-08700-01397
- Superintendent: Pamela Lathrop
- CEEB code: 221615
- Principal: Deborah Holman
- Teaching staff: 99.89 (FTE)
- Grades: 9-12
- Enrollment: 1,380 (2023-2024)
- Student to teacher ratio: 13.82
- Colors: Scarlet Red, Black, & White
- Athletics conference: Merrimack Valley Conference
- Team name: Scarlet Knights
- Rival: Andover High School
- Yearbook: The Knight
- Website: northandoverpublicschools.com

North Andover High School is a public high school in the town of North Andover, Massachusetts, United States. The school is a part of the North Andover Public School System, and is the only high school in the district. Construction on the school was completed in February 2004.

== Demographics ==
According to Massachusetts Department of Elementary and Secondary Education statistics, the demographic distributions for race, gender and grade for the 2024–2025 academic year are listed below:

Enrollment by Race/Ethnicity
Race	Percent of School
African American	3.8
Asian	7.2
Hispanic	16.4
Native American	0.3
White	67.7
Native Hawaiian, Pacific Islander	<0.1
Multi-Race, Non-Hispanic	4.5

Enrollment by Gender
Gender	Pupils Enrolled	Percent of School
Male	654	49.3
Female	668	50.3
Nonbinary	6	0.5
Total	1328	100

Enrollment by Grade
Grade	Pupils Enrolled	Percent of School
9	306	23.0
10	343	26.8
11	344	25.9
12	335	25.2

== Facilities ==
The school has a gymnasium with a rock climbing wall, rope ladders, an indoor track and a weight room. The performing arts center includes band and choral chambers and an 800 seat auditorium. Other features include two language labs and six computer labs. The football stadium has 4,000 seats and hosts local and regional events.

== Academics ==
North Andover High School offers basic AP courses. On the Massachusetts Comprehensive Assessment System, North Andover High School students are in the top half of the state, with over 95% pass rate on the English and Mathematics sections.

== Athletics ==
North Andover competed in the Cape Ann League from 1971 to 2012, until it moved back into the Merrimack Valley Conference. Because of total enrollment, North Andover High School is qualified in Division 2 by the Massachusetts Interscholastic Athletic Association and plays many games against non-league opponents with similar school size.

North Andover High School has 30 varsity sports, including soccer and lacrosse programs as well as a wrestling team.

== Activities ==
North Andover High School's Drama Guild holds four major performances every year. In January 2007, the school hosted its first One-Act festival, in which three One-Act productions were performed, a tradition that has since been discontinued. The One-Act performances were typically student directed plays. The guild is supported financially by a parent's organization.

The Pep Band plays at some school functions, including home basketball games and the Special Olympics. The school chorus was invited to sing at Carnegie Hall in April 2011 due to their gold medal rating at their competition in Philadelphia, PA.

Other extracurricular activities include academic teams (Math, Science or Model United Nations), intramural sports (Ping Pong, Environmental Club and Ultimate Frisbee), multicultural clubs (Spanish, German, and a Gender and Sexuality Alliance), and a dance club. The Johnson Chapter of the National Honor Society coordinates volunteer work from among the school's top ranked juniors and seniors.

== Notable alumni ==
- Chris Honeycutt, State champion wrestler; professional MMA fighter for Bellator MMA
