= James McCluskey =

American football player (born 1988)

No. 36
- Position: Fullback

Personal information
- Born: February 10, 1988 (age 38); Lowell, Massachusetts, U.S.
- Listed height: 6 ft 2 in (1.88 m)
- Listed weight: 251 lb (114 kg)

Career information
- High school: Billerica (MA)
- College: Boston College
- NFL draft: 2011: undrafted

Career history
- Oakland Raiders (2011)
- Stats at Pro Football Reference

James McCluskey (born February 10, 1988) is an American former football fullback. He signed with the Oakland Raiders as an undrafted free agent in 2011.

== College career ==
After redshirting the 2006-2007 season at Boston College, McCluskey emerged as the Eagles' starting fullback his freshman year, finishing the season with 2 catches for 13 yards and 8 carries for 14 yards and 3 touchdowns. During the 2008 season, McCluskey started the first 9 games before breaking his leg against Notre Dame, ending his season with 19 catches for 123 yards and rushing 23 times for 84 yards and a touchdown. In 2009, after recovering from an Achilles tear, McCluskey appeared in 8 games. Off the field, he and a teammate formed the Boston College chapter of Uplifting Athletes, raising thousands of dollars for cancer awareness and research. McCluskey was named team captain his senior year and appeared in all 13 games.

== Professional career ==
After the NFL lockout was lifted, McCluskey was signed as a free agent to the Oakland Raiders. During camp, he was placed on injured reserve and eventually released.

== Personal life ==
McCluskey is a 2006 graduate of Billerica Memorial High School and a 2010 graduate of Boston College's Carroll School of Management. James is the son of Nancy McCluskey and has two younger sisters named Audrey and Alyica
