= Haverhill High School =

- View of Haverhill High School in 2023, as seen from Monument Street.

Location
- 137 Monument Street; Haverhill, Massachusetts 01832; United States; 42°47′14″N 71°6′25″W

Information
- Other name: HHS, Haverhill High
- Type: Public high school
- Established: 1841
- School district: Haverhill Public Schools
- Superintendent: Margaret Marotta
- NCES School ID: 250597000856
- Principal: Michael Downs
- Teaching staff: 153.72 (on an FTE basis)
- Grades: 9–12
- Enrollment: 1,922 (2024-2025)
- Student to teacher ratio: 12.50
- Campus type: Suburban
- Colors: Brown and gold
- Athletics conference: Merrimack Valley Conference
- Mascot: Hillie
- Nickname: Hillies
- Accreditation: New England Association of Schools and Colleges (NEASC)
- Publication: Hillie Brown & Gold
- Newspaper: The Brown and Gold
- Budget: $136 million
- Website: hhs.haverhill-ps.org

Haverhill High School (HHS) is a public high school in Haverhill, Massachusetts, United States. Serving grades 9–12, it is the sole public high school in the Haverhill Public Schools district and offers open enrollment. As of the 2023–2024 school year, the school had an enrollment of 1,991 students.

The origin of public secondary education in the city date to 1841, when the town merged its first public high school with the pre-existing Haverhill Academy. The school occupied several buildings over the following century, including a prominent 1909 building on Main Street designed by C. Willis Damon that now serves as Haverhill City Hall. The high school moved to its current campus on Monument Street in 1963.

Haverhill High School's athletic teams are known as the Haverhill Hillies and compete in the Merrimack Valley Conference. The school is notable as the alma mater of Archie Comics creator Bob Montana, who used his experiences at the school as the basis for the fictional Riverdale High School.

== History ==
=== Early Foundations ===
Haverhill's first public high school was established after the town took over the building of the pre-existing private Haverhill Academy on Winter Street. The building, later known as the Whittier Building, was notable as the place where poet John Greenleaf Whittier had received his advanced schooling. This facility served as the city's high school until population growth rendered it inadequate.

=== Crescent Place and Main Street Era (1874–1963) ===
The late 19th and early 20th centuries were a period of significant prosperity for Haverhill, necessitating the construction of progressively larger high schools. This era was marked by architectural ambition, a devastating fire, and the school's emergence as a pop culture touchstone.

==== A new home on Crescent Place (1874) ====
To accommodate the growing student body, a new Haverhill High School was built, opening in September 1874. The three-story building was located on Crescent Place, across from G.A.R. Park. The original site of the school is now a commercial parking lot on what is today Winter Street, following urban renewal projects in the 1970s that realigned local streets.

==== The Grand Main Street School (1910) ====
By the turn of the 20th century, the Crescent Place building was severely overcrowded, leading the city to construct a grand new high school at 139 Main Street. The imposing brick structure was designed by C. Willis Damon, Haverhill's first college-trained architect and a graduate of MIT's architecture program. Construction began in 1908, and the school opened in September 1910. The project cost $350,000 and was designed for 800 students, lauded at the time as one of the region's most well-equipped educational facilities.

==== The "Annex" and the 1959 Fire ====
With the opening of the Main Street school, the 1874 Crescent Place building was repurposed as the "Haverhill High School Annex" to house the freshman class. The Annex's service ended abruptly in the early morning of Sunday, June 28, 1959, when it was completely destroyed by a five-alarm fire. The blaze, which fire officials suspected was arson, was the first five-alarm fire in the city's modern history and required 250 firefighters from 14 communities to control. The loss of the building, estimated at $250,000, created a severe space crisis and forced the city to expedite plans for a new high school.

==== The Two-Session System and Cultural Legacy ====
In response to the fire, the Haverhill School Committee voted on July 2, 1959, to implement a two-session system. Under this "two-platoon" arrangement, juniors and seniors attended classes in the morning, while freshmen and sophomores attended in the afternoon until 5 p.m. This stopgap measure remained in place for four years.

During its tenure, the Main Street school became a part of American pop culture history. Bob Montana, a student from 1936 to 1939, used the school, its faculty, and its students as the real-world inspiration for Riverdale High and the characters in his world-famous Archie Comics.

=== Monument Street Campus (1963–Present) ===
The combination of the post-war baby boom and the 1959 fire crisis prompted the city to build a modern, suburban campus, moving away from its traditional downtown school model.

==== A suburban campus for a new generation (1963) ====
Haverhill High School opened at its current Monument Street location in September 1963, ending the four-year period of two-session days. After the high school's relocation, the 1910 Main Street building temporarily housed students from Amesbury High School and later served as a campus for Northern Essex Community College. In 1973, it was renovated to become the new Haverhill City Hall, a role it continues to serve.

==== The rise of the academies (2000s) ====
In the 2000s, Haverhill High School restructured its academic programs into smaller "learning communities" or "academies" to create focused pathways for students. A key development was the founding of the Classical Academy in 2007 by a group of faculty members, including Paul White and Deborah Sasso-Flanagan, to provide a public school alternative to private schools that were attracting many of the district's top students. The academy's curriculum was modeled after programs at Boston Latin School and Lowell High School's Latin Lyceum. Other specialized programs were also developed, including a Business and Career Exploration Academy, a Humanities Academy, a Fine Arts Academy, a STEM Academy, and several Career Technical Education (CTE) programs.

==== 2010s ====
By the 2010s, the Monument Street campus was over fifty years old. A 2015 district review report from the Massachusetts Department of Elementary and Secondary Education noted that strategies for student engagement were being implemented less consistently at the high school compared to the district's other schools. In December 2019, the Haverhill School Committee reviewed a recent report from the New England Association of Schools and Colleges (NEASC). While the report commended the school's culture, parent involvement, and its 1:1 student device initiative, it also identified areas for improvement, including the need for "deeper learning, increased differentiation and instruction, and measuring outcomes."

==== 2020s ====
During the COVID-19 pandemic in April 2021, Haverhill Public Schools experienced a large ransomware attack that disrupted the district's computer systems, rendering remote learning impossible. The district technology department had decided to shut down the network to prevent widespread corruption. As a result, school was closed, with the district continuing to investigate the breach over the next few days, creating a major disturbance in the continued education of Haverhill students.

On March 31, 2022, an altercation between two students involving a knife at Haverhill High School led to the arrest of a female student. The incident sparked discussions about the school's phone seizure policy, as videos of the altercation were shared on social media, violating the school's cell phone policy. Haverhill School Committee held a special meeting to address the issue, emphasizing the importance of public engagement and the need for clear policies regarding phone misuse.

In October 2022, Haverhill High School staff went on strike after negotiations between the Haverhill Education Association (HEA) and the Haverhill School Committee failed to reach a mutual agreement on a new contract. The primary concerns of the union included increased wages, improved school safety measures, and better working conditions. The strike resulted in school closures for multiple days, affecting thousands of students.

In December 2022, a hazing incident at Haverhill High School came to state-wide attention, resulting in legal charges and termination of employment between two coaches, and the prosecution of an 18-year-old male student. The incident was the subject of a joint investigation by the Haverhill Police Department and the Essex District Attorney's Office.

In July 2023, foreign language teacher James Fiorentini, son of Haverhill's then Mayor James Fiorentini, was accused of making inappropriate comments to underage female students at Haverhill High School. The allegations led to an investigation by school officials and local authorities. James pleaded not guilty to two counts of accosting or annoying another person, both misdemeanors.

On February 26, 2024, Haverhill High School became the first school in the United States to take a live online tour of Auschwitz. The virtual tour called "Auschwitz in Front of Your Eyes" features recorded testimonies from concentration camp survivors, as well as a live tour with a guide who walks through the Auschwitz-Birkenau camps, giving a detailed description and view of the camps.

In September 2024, former Haverhill High School head football coach Timothy O’Connor was found not guilty of charges related to a hazing incident that occurred two years prior, between August and October 2022. O’Connor, who also taught at the school, had been accused of intimidating a witness, failing to comply with mandated reporter duties, and failing to report hazing after videos of a player engaging in explicit acts circulated within the school. After a nearly two-year legal battle, a judge in Haverhill District Court ruled that there was insufficient evidence to support the charges.

Assistant coach Michael Kwegyir-Attah also faced charges in connection with the case, which were dismissed the day before O’Connor's verdict. However, Jesse Rodriguez, an 18-year-old player, still faced charges including hazing, assault and battery, and assault and battery on a person 14 years or older.

On June 26, 2025, WHAV News reported that nearly 50% of Haverhill High School students (about 920 students) were chronically absent during the 2024–2025 school year, marking a 6.2% increase from the previous year. Superintendent Margaret Marotta noted that while some elementary and middle schools showed improvement, absenteeism at the high school remained high. The report also highlighted that other schools in the district, including Dr. Albert B. Consentino School, Golden Hill School, and Bradford Elementary School, significantly reduced their absenteeism rates. School officials stated that stronger engagement between administrators, guidance counselors, students, and families has helped address attendance issues, and the district plans to share effective strategies among schools to improve high school attendance.

== Athletics ==
Haverhill High School competes in the Merrimack Valley Conference and is a member of the Massachusetts Interscholastic Athletic Association (MIAA).

== Notable alumni ==
- Wayne Chang (Class of '01), serial entrepreneur, founded Crashlytics, Digits, i2hub and many others. Also involved with Napster, Dropbox, and the Facebook / Winklevoss battle.
- Jordan Harris (born 2000), NHL hockey player for the Boston Bruins
- Bob Montana, comic strip artist — creator of Archie Comics which its high school, known as Riverdale High School, is based on this school when it was in its previous location
- Rob Zombie, musician and filmmaker, co-founder of the heavy metal band White Zombie.
- Tom Bergeron
- Carlos Peña
- Seth Romatelli
- Charles Silvia, Springfield College swimmer, Olympic coach and swimming coach for Springfield College from 1937 through 1978.
