= Stoneham High School =

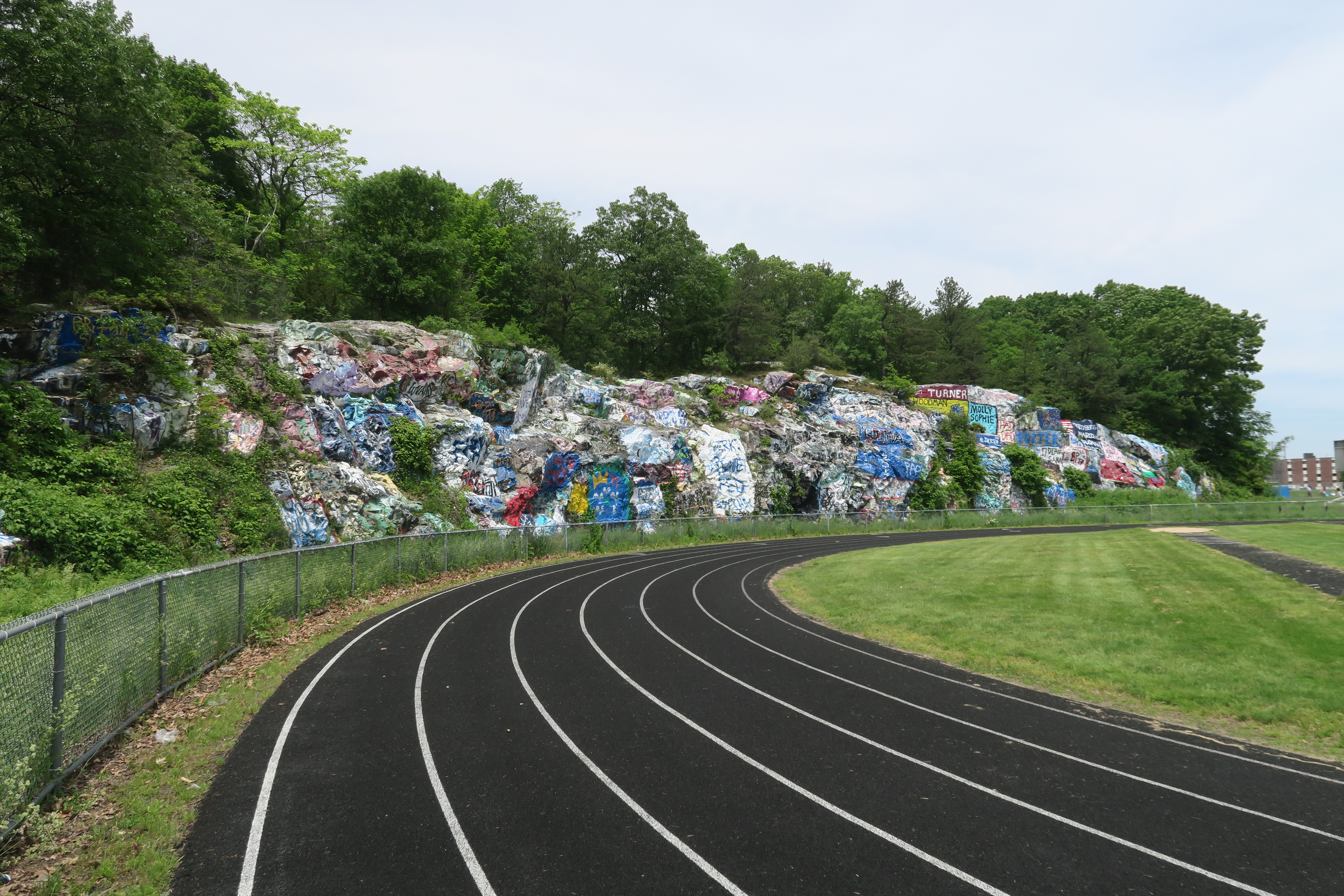
- On the running track

Location
- 149 Franklin St; Stoneham, MA 02180; United States; 42.4726°N 71.0890°W

Information
- Type: Public high school
- School district: Stoneham Public Schools
- Teaching staff: 55.88 (FTE)
- Grades: 9–12
- Enrollment: 599 (2024–2025)
- Student to teacher ratio: 10.72
- Colors: Blue, and White
- Nickname: Spartans
- Information: 781-279-3810
- Website: www.stonehamschools.org/schools/stoneham-high-school

Stoneham High School is a public high school located in Stoneham, Massachusetts, United States. It is accredited by the New England Association of Schools and Colleges. Stoneham High School student-athletes compete in the Middlesex League.

The principal of Stoneham High School is Dr. Stephen Burnham. Dr. Kristin DeFrancisco is the superintendent of Stoneham Public Schools.

== Academics ==
For the 2024–2025 school year, mean SAT scores were 573 in Reading and Writing and 556 in Mathematics.

SHS offers Advanced Placement courses in 22 subjects, including AP United States History, AP English Language and Composition, AP Italian Language and Culture, AP Biology, and AP Calculus AB. For the 2024–2025 school year, 74% of scores were 3-5, while 26% of scores were 1-2..

== Athletics ==
Stoneham High School is a member of the Massachusetts Interscholastic Athletic Association and the Middlesex League. David Pignone is the athletic director for Stoneham High School. The following is the list of offered sports:

- Fall
  - Cheerleading
  - Cross Country
  - Field Hockey
  - Football
  - Golf
  - Soccer
  - Swimming (Girls)
  - Volleyball
- Winter
  - Basketball
  - Gymnastics
  - Hockey
  - Indoor Track
  - Swimming (Boys)
- Spring
  - Baseball
  - Lacrosse
  - Outdoor Track
  - Softball
  - Tennis

== Performing arts ==
The Drama Club puts on three productions each year: one production in the fall, a 40-minute piece in the winter (which they bring to the Massachusetts High School Drama Guild One-Act Festival), and a musical in the spring. The drama club is completely student-run, only having faculty/adult supervision and direction.

They went to the state finals in March/April 2014 for their adaptation of the stage version of Spring Awakening. They also attended state finals again in March/April 2017 for their adaptation of "Kindertransport."

The Drama Club also made it to the semi-finals round in 2019 with their performance of The Yellow Boat.

== Demographics ==
The racial makeup of Stoneham High School is: 77.6% White, 11.1% Hispanic, 6.3% Asian, and 2.2% Black.

== Notable alumni ==
- Glenn Adamson: curator, author, and art historian
- Peter Adamson: professor of philosophy
- Quincy Brisco: comedian and media personality
- Mario Cantone: comedian and actor
- Sandro Corsaro: American animator and author
- Charles Gibbons: Speaker of the Massachusetts House of Representatives and 1958 candidate for governor
- Josh Gondelman: actor, comedy writer, and stand-up comedian
- George J. Hall: U.S. Army soldier and Medal of Honor recipient in World War II
- Chris J. Johnson: actor
- Nancy Kerrigan: two-time Olympic figure skating medalist
- Killer Kowalski: professional wrestler
- Hideo Mabuchi: physicist and Professor of Applied Physics
- Joe McLaughlin: linebacker for the Green Bay Packers and New York Giants
- Joe Vitiello: Major League Baseball player from 1995 to 2003
- Steve Yarbrough: novelist
