= Merrimack Valley Conference =

High school athletic conference

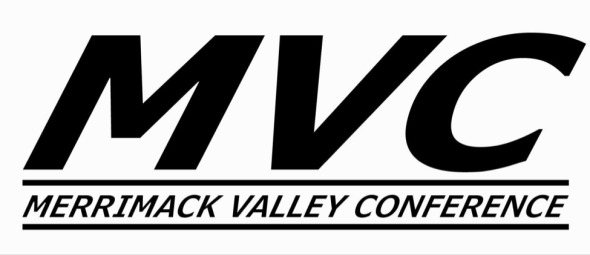
- Founded: 1946
- Divisions: 2
- No. of teams: 11

The Merrimack Valley Conference is a high school athletic conference in District 4 of the Massachusetts Interscholastic Athletic Association (MIAA). The conference was founded c. 1946 and was originally known as the Lowell Suburban Loop.

The conference consists of ten public high schools and one catholic school split into two sections. All schools are in towns or cities on or near the Merrimack River, hence the name.

Merrimack Valley Conference
Locations of the Merrimack Valley Conference schools. Merrimack Valley I schools in red, Merrimack Valley II schools in blue

== History ==
The first Merrimack Valley Conference was a different league created by way of a "Football Jamboree" which included schools Keith Academy, Manchester Central (N.H.), St. Clement's, Nashua High School (N.H.), Lowell High School, St. John's of Concord (N.H.), Lawrence High School, and Cathedral High School of Manchester (N.H.). By 1950, the league had ceased to exist.

As for the Lowell Suburban Loop, the league consisted of at least eight teams for the first twenty years of its existence, including Ayer, Billerica, Burlington, Chelmsford, Dracut, Methuen, North Andover, Tewksbury, and Wilmington. Andover joined when the league renamed themselves to the Merrimack Valley Conference in 1965. Ayer was the first to leave in 1956, and the league remained stable for almost 15 years following this.

In the spring of 1971, North Andover opted to drop out of the conference to join the Cape Ann League. Austin Prep. and Central Catholic pushed for membership the same year and were rejected. They got their chance the following year when Andover and Burlington applied for Middlesex League membership. Only Burlington was taken, and Austin Prep. and Central Catholic filled Burlington's and North Andover's spots. Lawrence, Lowell, and Haverhill, which were trying to find a new home as the Essex County League started to fall apart, began flirting with joining the MVC in 1973 by joining for golf and tennis. Lawrence was the first to obtain full membership in 1974; the league was still hesitant to add Lowell and Haverhill

With a new decade in 1980 came a new setup for the league; a fourteen team super conference, with football having two divisions split between east and west. The east featured Andover, Austin Prep., Central Catholic, Lawrence, and Mathuen; along with newcomers Greater Lawrence Tech. and after a long wait, Haverhill. The west included Billerica, Chelmsford, Dracut, Tewksbury, and Wilmington; and the other league newcomers Lowell and Greater Lowell Tech.

After a weak two seasons, Austin Prep. and Greater Lowell left the conference in 1982; the former to the Catholic Conference and the latter became an independent. Greater Lawrence tried to jump ships to the Commonwealth Athletic Conference in 1985 and was denied entry, leaving them independent.

The league remained stable from here for the better part of ten years, until Lawrence left to be independent in 1994. The following year, Wilmington left to the lower division Cape Ann League. Lawrence rejoined the league in 2009, the year the Merrimack Valley split into two divisions, large and small. The large schools were Andover, Billerica, Central Catholic, Chelmsford & Lowell; the small schools were Dracut, Haverhill, Lawrence, Methuen, and Tewksbury. After 41 years in the Cape Ann League, North Andover returned to the Merrimack Valley in 2012, taking the league back to eleven members, which remains as of early 2026.

== Member Schools ==
School	Location	Mascot	Colors	Joined League	Year Founded	Enrollment
Merrimack Valley I
Andover High School	Andover, Massachusetts	Golden Warriors	Navy Blue & Gold	1965	1854	1,578
Billerica Memorial High School	Billerica, Massachusetts	Indians	Forest Green & White	1955	1955	1,737
Central Catholic High School	Lawrence, Massachusetts	Raiders	Red & Navy Blue	1972	1935	1,200
Chelmsford High School	Chelmsford, Massachusetts	Lions	Maroon & White	1946	1917	1,442
Haverhill High School	Haverhill, Massachusetts	Hillies	Brown & Gold	1980	1841	1,850
Lowell High School	Lowell, Massachusetts	Red Raiders	Red & Gray	1980	1831	3,374
North Andover High School	North Andover, Massachusetts	Scarlet Knights	Scarlet, Black & White	1946-1971, 2012-present	1954	1,288
Merrimack Valley II
Dracut High School	Dracut, Massachusetts	Middies	Navy Blue, Colombia Blue, & White	1946	1934	763
Lawrence High School	Lawrence, Massachusetts	Lancers	Navy Blue & White	1974-1994, 2009-present	1901	3,280
Methuen High School	Methuen, Massachusetts	Rangers	Blue & White	1946	1874	1,751
Tewksbury Memorial High School	Tewksbury, Massachusetts	Redmen	Scarlet, White, & Royal Blue	1946	1905	730

== Former Members ==
School	Location	Mascot	Colors	Joined	Left	Current Conference
Austin Preparatory School	Reading, Massachusetts	Cougars	Green, White, & Black	1972	1982	New England Preparatory School Athletic Council
Ayer Shirley Regional High School	Ayer, Massachusetts	Panther	Maroon & White	1946	1956	Midland Wachusett League
Burlington High School	Burlington, Massachusetts	Red Devils	Red, White, & Blue	1946	1972	Middlesex League
Greater Lawrence Technical School	Andover, Massachusetts	Reggies	Black & Orange	1980	1985	Commonwealth Athletic Conference
Greater Lowell Technical High School	Tyngsborough, Massachusetts	Gryphons	Blue & Gold	1980	1982	Commonwealth Athletic Conference
Wilmington High School	Wilmington, Massachusetts	Wildcats	Navy Blue, Colombia Blue, & White	1946	1995	Middlesex League

== State championships ==
This is a list of MIAA State championships won by schools while a part of the Merrimack Valley Conference

=== Football ===
- Andover - 1974, 1975 D2 Eastern
- Tewksbury - 1985 D2 Eastern; 1996 D2B Eastern
- Chelmsford - 1987 D2 Eastern; 1991, 1994 D2A Eastern; 2007 D1A Eastern
- Dracut - 1988 D2 Eastern; 2008 D1A Eastern
- Methuen - 1992 D2A Eastern
- Billerica - 1993, 1999 D2A Eastern
- Central Catholic - 1997 D2B Eastern; 1998 D2C Eastern; 2013 D1

=== Cross Country ===
==== Boys ====
- Chelmsford - 1988 D1

=== Fall Volleyball ===
- Chelmsford - 1985, 1986 D1

=== Soccer ===
==== Girls ====
- Central Catholic - 2010 D1

=== Fall Swim & Dive ===
==== Boys ====
- Methuen - 2021-2024 D1
- Billerica - 2021-2023 D2

==== Girls ====
- Andover - 1999-2007, 2009-2012, 2014-2019 D1
- Chelmsford - 2008, 2013 D1
- Central Catholic - 2004 D2

=== Basketball ===
==== Boys ====
- Chelmsford - 1951 Class C
- North Andover - 1958 Class C
- Central Catholic - 1999, 2008, 2010 D1

==== Girls ====
- Methuen - 1986, 1999 D1
- Haverhill - 1987, 1989, 1992, 1994-1996 D1
- Andover - 2003, 2010-2012, 2020 (Co-champs with Franklin High School), 2023 D1
- Central Catholic - 2009, 2013 D1

=== Winter Swim & Dive ===
==== Boys ====
- Chelmsford - 2002-2004 D1

=== Gymnastics ===
- Dracut - 1989, 1990
- Andover - 2000
- Chelmsford - 2006

=== Ice Hockey ===
==== Boys ====
- Billerica- 1975-1977, 2025 D2
- Chelmsford - 1995 D1
- Tewksbury - 1995, 2011, 2022 D2
- Catholic Memorial - 2009 D1A

==== Girls ====
- Methuen - 2019 (Co-Champs with Tewksbury Memorial High School), 2026 D1
- Tewksbury - 2019 (Co-champs with Methuen High School) D1

=== Indoor Track & Field ===
==== Boys ====
- Andover - 1970, 1984 Class B
- Wilmington 1975 Class C
- Methuen - 1978, 1979, 1983 Class B
- Chelmsford - 1984, 1985, 1990 Class A
- Central Catholic - 1995 Class B; 2004, 2005 D2
- Tewksbury - 2005 D3
- Lowell - 2013, 2018-2020, 2025 D1; 2020, 2022 All-State
- North Andover - 2022-2024 D2

==== Girls ====
- Billerica - 1979 Class A; 2023, 2024, 2025 D3
- Tewksbury - 1990 Class B
- Central Catholic - 2005-2007 D2; 2024 D1

=== Alpine Ski ===
==== Boys ====
- Haverhill - 1982
- Andover - 2011

==== Girls ====
- North Andover - 2015

=== Wrestling ===
==== Boys ====
- Clemsford - 1969, 1970 All-State; 1976, 1977, 1985, 1986, 1990, 1999, 2000, 2016, 2018 D1
- Lowell - 1981, 1989, 1996, 2002, 2004, 2005, 2007, 2008 D1
- Billerica - 1983, 1993 D1
- Tewksbury - 1989, D2; 2025 D3
- Methuen 1997, 2012 D1
- Central Catholic - 1998, 2026 D1; 2002, 2003, 2019 D2
- Dracut - 2004 D2
- Lawrence - 2011 D1
- North Andover - 2013, 2014 D2
- Haverhill - 2024 All-State

==== Girls ====
- Lowell - 2024 D1 & All State; 2026 D1

=== Baseball ===
- Andover - 1991, 1992 D1
- Chelmsford - 2025 D1

=== Softball ===
- Wilmington - 1993, 1994 D2
- Dracut - 1997, 1998 D2
- Chelmsford - 1999 D1
- Lowell - 2005 D1

=== Outdoor Track & Field ===
==== Boys ====
- Andover - 1966, 1968, 1970, 1973, 1979 (Co-Champs with Ayer-Shirley), 1984, 2009, 2010, 2015 All-State
- Methuen - 1985 All-State
- Haverhill - 1998 D1
- Lowell - 2018, 2019 All-State; 2025 D1
- North Andover - 2022, 2023, 2026 D2

==== Girls ====
- Billerica 1980 All-State; 2023 D3; 2026 D2
- Chelmsford - 1990 All-State
- Methuen - 1995 All-State
- Andover - 2005 All-State, 2023 D1; 2025 D3
- North Andover - 2025 D2

=== Tennis ===
==== Girls ====
- Andover - 2007, 2014, 2015 D1

=== Lacrosse ===
==== Boys ====
- Billerica - 2001 D1; 2025 D2
