= Bob Ganley (city administrator) =

American politician

- Born: 1949; Woburn, Massachusetts, United States
- Died: December 23, 2000 (aged 50–51)
- Occupation: City administrator

Robert Ganley (1949-December 23, 2000) was an American city manager from Maine. Ganley was the city manager of South Portland, Maine (1981–86) and neighboring Portland, Maine (1986-2000) for nearly twenty years.

== Early life and education ==
Ganley was born in Woburn, Massachusetts. While attending nearby Burlington High School, Ganley played baseball, basketball, and was captain of the football team. He attended the University of Massachusetts Amherst, where he wrote for the Daily Collegian and was a member of the Beta Kappa Phi fraternity. In 1972, he graduated from the University of Pennsylvania with a master's degree in public administration. He was then drafted into the U.S. Army and worked in the Provost marshal's office at Fort Meade. During his time in South Portland city government, he earned a M.A. in public administration from the University of Southern Maine.

== Municipal administration ==
After two years in the Army, he returned to Massachusetts and worked for the town of Burlington. In 1976, he moved to South Portland, Maine and was appointed assistant city manager. Five years later, he was appointed city manager.

In the summer of 1987, homeless residents of Portland protested the lack of sufficient shelter. At the time, the city operated one shelter with 53 beds. To protest this, activists camped out in Lincoln Park. Ganley "initially resisted the demands of protesters to open a new shelter, and even threatened to arrest protesters if they did not leave their encampment." Eventually, Ganley acknowledged that the city government "would do its part" to help those experiencing homelessness, which led to the city reopening funding for shelters.

Ganley is credited with helping bring the Portland Sea Dogs baseball team to the city and the building of the stadium in which they play (Hadlock Field). Following his death in late 2000, the team named a luxury suite in Ganley's honor. In 2006, the team inducted Ganley into their Hall of Fame.

In December 2000, Ganley died suddenly from a heart attack. He was replaced the next year by Joe Gray as Portland's City Manager.

In April 2001, Congressman and Portland resident Tom Allen delivered a memorial speech in his honor to the U.S. House of Representatives.
