= Central Catholic High School (Massachusetts) =

School in Lawrence, Massachusetts, US

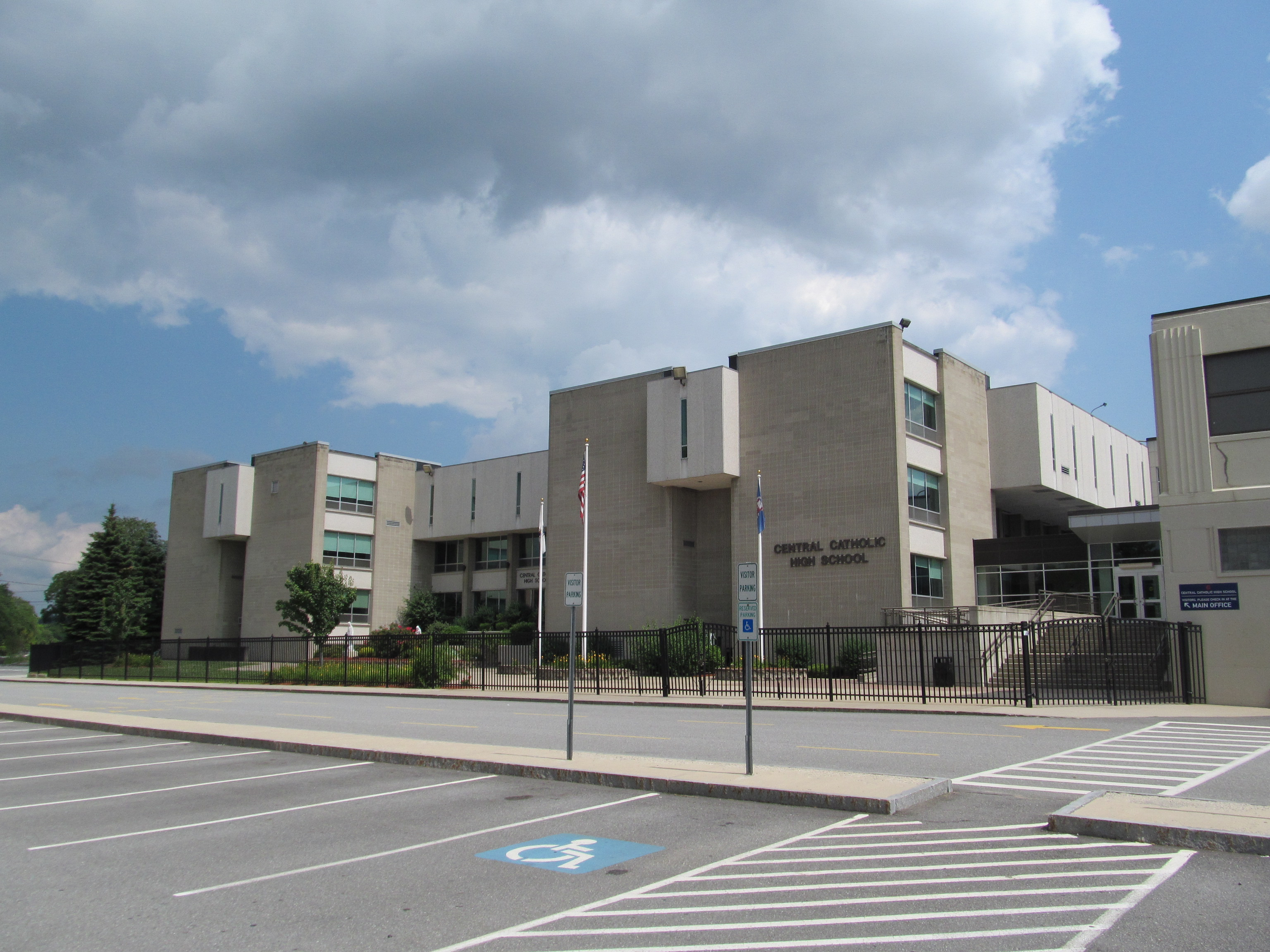
- Central Catholic High School

Location
- 300 Hampshire Street; Lawrence, (Essex County), Massachusetts 01841; United States; 42°42′45″N 71°10′17″W

Information
- Type: Private; Independent; college-preparatory; Catholic school
- Religious affiliations: Catholic, Marist Brothers
- Patron saints: Saint Marcellin Champagnat, Saint Thérèse of Lisieux
- Established: 1935
- Founder: Brother Florentius
- Status: Open
- President: Jodi Linnehan Kriner
- Chair: Lynne Chase
- Principal: Doreen Keller
- Faculty: 125
- Grades: 9–12
- Gender: Co-educational
- Enrollment: 1200 (2025–2026)
- Average class size: 24
- Student to teacher ratio: 14:1
- Campus: Urban
- Campus size: 1 Block
- Campus type: Cluster
- Colors: Red and Navy
- Athletics conference: Merrimack Valley Conference (MVC)
- Nickname: Raiders
- Team name: Central Catholic Raiders
- Accreditation: New England Association of Schools and Colleges
- Publication: The Emblem
- Tuition: $17,700 (2024–2025)
- Alumni: 14,000+
- Admissions Director: Kathryn Delgiacco
- Athletic Director: Zach Blaszak
- Website: www.centralcatholic.net

Central Catholic High School is a four-year private, Catholic, college preparatory school with an academic and athletic campus in Lawrence, Massachusetts, associated with the Marist Brothers of the Schools and the Archdiocese of Boston and founded in 1935 by Brother Florentius.

In 2010, Doreen Keller became the school's first woman principal. The president is Chris Sullivan. The school has approximately 1,200 students and 18,000+ alumni. It was originally a boys-only school but has been co-educational since 1996.

== History ==
- 1926: Brother Florentius founds Mount Saint Michael Academy in the Bronx, New York City
- 1932: Brother Florentius is assigned as principal of St. Anne's School in Lawrence, Massachusetts
- 1935
  - July: Brother Florentius announces that Central Catholic High School was scheduled to open in July, meeting the need of an all-boys school in Lawrence
  - September 16: Fifty boys began their first day of classes at Central Catholic at its location on Main Street
- 1936–1938: The school outgrows its small campus at the Knights of Columbus building and expands into borrowed spaces at Holy Trinity School, Franklin Street School, and Hampshire Street School. The Hampshire Street site would later grow into the school's current location.
- 1938
  - May 1: Brother Florentius dies
  - July 10: Ground is broken on Auburn Street, near the intersection of Hampshire Street, on a permanent building for the school
  - August: Brother Joseph Abel is named principal
  - June: The fifty boys who enrolled in school four years previously become the school's first graduating class
  - December 11: The completed building is dedicated, complete with eight classrooms, a library, cafeteria, science laboratory, and residential quarters for the fifteen Marist Brothers who taught at the school
- June 1945: The school graduates its 400th student
- 1950: Memorial Gymnasium Building is completed with the largest-at-the-time auditorium seating 2500 and gymnasium in the Merrimack Valley, locker rooms, and more classrooms.
- 1951: Memorial Gymnasium Building is dedicated to fourteen alumni killed in action during World War II
- 1960: The first three lay teachers are hired at the school.
- 1969: The Board of Directors are established and initiate a campaign to construct a new building
- 1970: The new building, at 300 Hampshire Street, is opened and is still used to this day.
- September 16, 1971: The Hampshire Street building is dedicated
- 1972: The Auburn Street building's use is discontinued
- 1984: The Auburn Street building is demolished
- Mid '90s: The Memorial Gymnasium Building undergoes extensive renovations.
- September 1996: Upon the closing of its sister school, St. Mary's High School, Central Catholic opens in September as a co-educational institution and admitting young women from St Mary's as well as from throughout the Merrimack Valley.
- December 1997: Football team wins the MIAA Division II Super Bowl by beating Wakefield, MA 34–16 behind captain Joseph Uliano '98 who was The Eagle-Tribune Defensive Player of the Year and named to both the Boston Herald and Boston Globe All-Scholastic Teams.
- December 1998: Football team repeats as MIAA Division II Super Bowl champions with its 29–13 victory over Acton-Boxborough Regional High School (Acton, MA) behind captain and 2-time MIAA Super Bowl champion quarterback Niall Murphy '99.
- March 14, 1999: The Central Catholic Boys Varsity Basketball Team wins their first MIAA (Massachusetts Interscholastic Athletic Association) Division 1 State Championship, beating Holy Name of Worcester 63–57 in the title game. The team was led by Gatorade Massachusetts Player of the Year, Merrimack Valley Conference MVP, Boston Globe All-Scholastic, and eventual McDonald's All-American Scott Hazelton '00.
- 1999: Brother Thomas Long, FMS, who graduated from the school in 1973, is appointed as the first president of the school. David DeFillippo, from the class of 1966, is appointed as the schools first layperson principal.
- 2005: A brand new addition is opened which connects the Memorial Gymnasium to the Hampshire street building and includes an additional wing and a new main entrance between the buildings, a new cafeteria, chapel, and state-of-the-art lab and computer facilities
- 2006: For the first time in the school's history, 100% of Central Catholic's 272 seniors graduate and go on to higher education.
- March 15, 2008: The Central Catholic Boys Varsity Basketball Team wins the MIAA (Massachusetts Interscholastic Athletic Association) Division 1 State Championship, beating St. John's High School (Shrewsbury, MA) in the title game, and complete the season ranked #17 in the nation by maxpreps.com.
- July 2010: Doreen Keller is named the first woman principal at Central Catholic.
- November 2010: The girl's varsity soccer team wins their first-ever MIAA Division 1 State Title in the 15-year history of the program. The game was against Shrewsbury at Worcester State College on November 19 where the Raiders took the Colonials down 2–1.
- August 2013: School President Bro. Thomas P. Long, FMS resigns.
- October 2013: Brother Rick Carey is named CCHS President.
- December 7, 2013: Football team wins the MIAA Division I State Championship by defeating Xaverian 34–17, behind head coach Chuck Adamopoulos, nicknamed Ground Chuck, captain and All-State running back D'Andre Drummond-Mayrie and wide receiver Cody Demers.
- November 3, 2025: Jodi Linnehan Kriner becomes the first female President of Central Catholic High School.

== Athletics ==
Central Catholic Raiders are a member of the MIAA and the Merrimack Valley Conference. Up until 1996, the athletic teams were known as the Red Raiders, but the school dropped the word "Red" in 2000. The school offers 29 varsity programs and 51 teams at levels such as varsity, junior varsity, and freshman. Central Catholic has a softball field and open practice field on its Lawrence, MA campus. The boys' hockey team practices and plays their home games at Icenter in Salem NH.

On February 21, 2021, the boys' hockey team beat Tewksbury (5–2) to win the (first-ever due to COVID-19) MVC Division 1 championship cup; they would finish the season 9–1. The Central Catholic Boys Hockey Team has won the MVC championship 13 times, with the most recent being in 2022, and has qualified for the MIAA Super 8 Tournament 10 times, most recently in 2018. In 2022, The team qualified for the inaugural reconfigured 32 team state tournament as the no. 17 seed before being defeated 2–1 in the first round by no. 16 Winchester. On February 24, 2007, the Central Catholic Raiders received their first invitation to participate in a play-in game for the Super 8 Hockey Tournament. The team beat Waltham High School in the play-in game and then won one game against Malden Catholic High School and lose to both Catholic Memorial School and Weymouth High School in the round-robin bracket round.

The football team, track teams, and girls' lacrosse team share the Veterans Memorial Stadium with Lawrence High School. The baseball team has qualified for the MIAA tournament 20 of the past 24 years winning the North Sectional Championship once while runners up two other times. The baseball team has 8 MVC championship crowns, most recently in 2019.

In 2008 the baseball team won the MIAA sportsmanship TEAM award as well as the Massachusetts Alliance for Sportsmanship award given by the Boston Red Sox. Girls were state champions in 2009.

The boys won the 2009 state championship in outdoor track. The boys' and girls' track teams won the 2017 state championships in outdoor track. The softball team in 2008 won the Division 2 North Sectional Championship and more recently won the MVC Championship in 2010. The Lady Raider soccer program won its first MVC crown in ten years in 2008 and won again in 2009. On March 14, 2009, the girls won the state championship in girls' hoop at the DCU Center in Worcester, MA. The boys' outdoor track team were state champions in 2009 and 2010.

In 2013, the football team finished the season with a 12–1 record and defeated Xaverian in the Division 1 State Championship by a score of 34–17 at Gillette Stadium in Foxborough Massachusetts.

The school colors are red and navy blue. Those colors are worn during pep rallies and games as Central Catholic has had a history of dedicated fans known as the "red sea" who have gone out of their way to show their dedication. "Moses Parting the Red Sea", one of the rallying cheers, has gone viral on Facebook since 2010.

=== Sports teams ===
- Baseball (boys' varsity, junior varsity, and freshman)
- Basketball (boys' and girls' varsity, junior varsity, and freshman)
- Cheerleading (co-ed varsity and junior varsity)
- Cross Country (boys' and girls' varsity and junior varsity)
- Field Hockey (girl's varsity and junior varsity)
- Football (varsity, junior varsity, sophomore, and freshman)
- Golf (co-ed, varsity)
- Gymnastics (co-ed, varsity)
- Ice hockey (varsity, junior varsity a, and junior varsity b)
- Indoor Track (boys' and girls' varsity and junior varsity)
- Lacrosse (boys' and girls' varsity and junior varsity)
- Outdoor Track (boys' and girls' varsity, junior varsity)
- Soccer (boys' and girls' varsity, junior varsity, and freshman)
- Softball (girls' varsity, junior varsity, and freshman)
- Swimming and Diving (boys' and girls' varsity)
- Tennis (boys' and girls' varsity)
- Volleyball (boys' and girls' varsity and junior varsity and girls' freshman)
- Wrestling (co-ed varsity and junior varsity)

== Notable alumni ==
- Pat DeCola (2005), NASCAR
- Cam Devanney (2015), professional baseball player
- Karoline Leavitt (2015), White House Press Secretary under 47th President Donald Trump
- Jonathan Lemire (1997), journalist and host of MSNBC's Way Too Early
- Phillip Picardi (2009), journalist
- Preston Zinter (2023), college football tight end for the Rice Owls
