= Chelmsford High School =

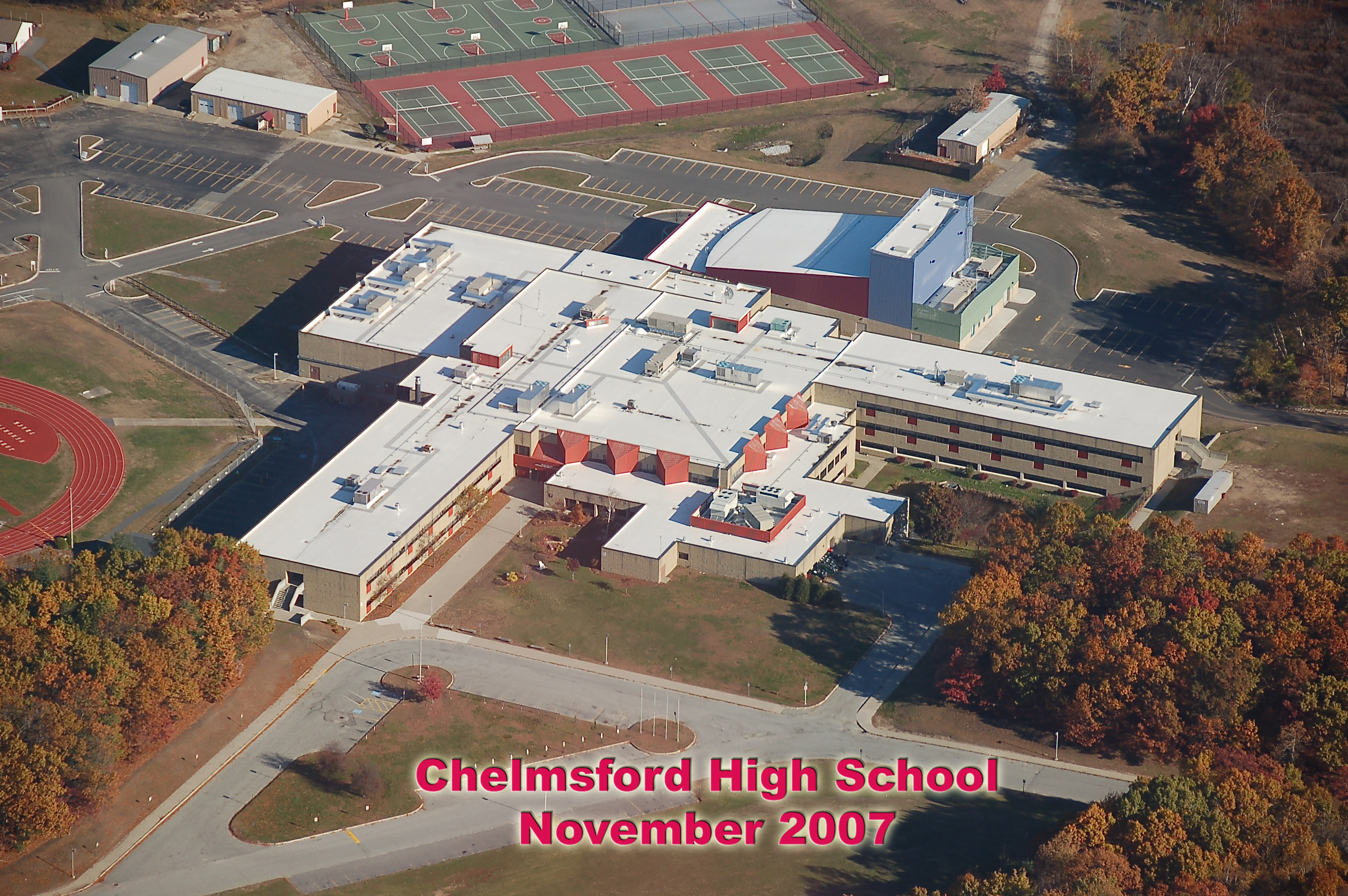

Location
- 200 Richardson Road; Chelmsford, Massachusetts 01863; United States; 42.621082°N 71.375792°W

Information
- Type: Public High School
- Established: 1917
- Status: Open
- Principal: Steve Murray
- Teaching staff: 100.30 (FTE)
- Grades: 9–12
- Enrollment: 1,402 (2024-2025)
- Student to teacher ratio: 13.98
- Language: English
- Hours in school day: 6.5 hours (7:19-1:51)
- Houses: Emerson, Hawthorne, Whittier
- Colors: Maroon and White
- Athletics conference: Merrimack Valley Conference (MVC)
- Mascot: Lion
- Team name: Chelmsford Lions
- Newspaper: The Roar
- Yearbook: The Lion
- Website: chs.chelmsfordschools.org

Chelmsford High School is a public high school founded in 1917. The current building is located in North Chelmsford, Massachusetts, United States, and was built in 1974. Before 1974 the high school was located in the current McCarthy Middle School building. It serves as the public high school for students in grades 9–12 and has been ranked among the top 500 schools in the nation by Newsweek.

It is part of a central campus that includes four of the town's seven schools. The three other schools at the central campus are the C. Edith McCarthy Middle School, the Col. Moses S. Parker Middle School and the Charles D. Harrington Elementary School.

== House structure ==
The school is based on a three-house system. The houses are named after Ralph Waldo Emerson, Nathaniel Hawthorne and John Greenleaf Whittier, three famous New England writers. When the school was built, there was an additional house named for Emily Dickinson. After a decade, the school branched out from the house system; the classes were no longer strictly divided into house hallways. Now, the house structure mainly serves administrative functions. Each house has two to three guidance counselors, a dean and an office. All students are assigned a house the year preceding their entrance into the school.

== Renovations ==
The school has recently undergone extensive renovation. The renovations included a complete overhaul of all existing science classrooms as well as the construction of a second science wing in the space formerly used for district administration offices. New ceilings and floor tiles, electrical and HVAC upgrades, and a 1,000-seat state-of-the-art Performing Arts Center (P.A.C.) were added as well. The construction, completed in 2007, gave Chelmsford High School its own auditorium for the first time in its (then) 33-year history. Previously, any performances put on by the high school were held in the 600-seat auditorium of neighboring McCarthy Middle School, the town's former high school. The new P.A.C. serves as a forum for functions such as the performances by the school's music and theater programs and various assemblies. As of May 28, 2014 the P.A.C. has been named the "Carl Rondina Performing Arts Center" in honor of longtime chorus teacher and music director Carl Rondina who recently retired. More recently, renovations have been made in the gymnasium, applying a more modern look.

Further facility upgrades completed in 2008 include new enclosed stairwells at the end of the two large classroom wings to improve building flow from floor to floor, as well as a renovated library media center. New lockers have also been installed in all sections of the building.

== Athletics ==
The athletics teams from CHS compete in the Merrimack Valley Conference (MVC). The MVC has long been considered one of the most competitive leagues on a state level.

Varsity sports offered include:

- Fall
  - cheerleading
  - boys & girls cross country
  - field hockey
  - football
  - golf,
  - boys & girls soccer
  - girls swimming & diving
  - girls volleyball
- Winter
  - boys & girls basketball
  - cheerleading
  - gymnastics
  - boys & girls ice hockey
  - boys & girls indoor track and field
  - boys & girls skiing
  - boys swimming & diving
  - wrestling
- Spring
  - baseball
  - boys & girls lacrosse
  - rugby
  - softball
  - boys & girls tennis
  - boys & girls outdoor track and field
  - boys volleyball

Beginning in 2016–17, CHS entered into a cooperative girls hockey team with neighboring Billerica. Beginning in 2018–19, CHS entered into a cooperative girls gymnastics team with neighboring Billerica and Tyngsboro.

=== Massachusetts state championships ===
Chelmsford Lions 21st century MIAA State Championships include:

- 2000: Wrestling Division 1 MIAA State Champions
- 2002: Boys Swimming & Diving Division 1 MIAA State Champions
- 2003: Boys Swimming & Diving Division 1 MIAA State Champions
- 2004: Boys Swimming & Diving Division 1 MIAA State Champions
- 2006: Girls Gymnastics Division 1 MIAA State Champions
- 2007: Football Eastern Massachusetts Division 1 Super Bowl Champions
- 2008: Girls Swimming & Diving Division 1 MIAA State Champions
- 2013: Girls Swimming & Diving Division 1 MIAA State Champions
- 2016: Wrestling Division 1 MIAA State Champions
- 2018: Wrestling Division 1 MIAA State Champions
- 2025: Baseball Division 1 MIAA State Champions

== Notable alumni ==
Notable Chelmsford High School alumni include:

- Keith Aucoin, former NHL player for the Carolina Hurricanes, Washington Capitals, Norwich University
- Nancy Bauer, author and nonfiction writer
- Jeff Bauman, author and survivor of the Boston Marathon bombing
- Phil Bourque, former NHL player for the Pittsburgh Penguins
- Gerry Callahan, radio show host, sports journalist, and podcaster
- Dawn Clements, artist and teacher
- George Condo, visual artist
- Bill Cooke, former NFL player for the Green Bay Packers and San Francisco 49ers
- Dan Curran, former NFL player for the Seattle Seahawks and New Orleans Saints
- Jack Eichel, NHL player for the Vegas Golden Knights
- Chevonne Forgan, American luger
- J. Bryan Hehir, theologian, professor at Harvard University, Secretary for Social Services for the Archdiocese of Boston, MacArthur Fellow
- Heather Linstad, college ice hockey coach for the University of Connecticut Huskies
- Greg Marcks, film director and screenwriter, 11:14, Echelon Conspiracy
- Mark T. Maybury, 33rd Chief Scientist to the United States Air Force, chief scientific adviser to the Chief of Staff of the Air Force and Secretary of the U.S. Air Force
- Sean McAdam, sports journalist and author
- Jon Morris, former NHL player for the New Jersey Devils and Boston Bruins
- Colleen Mullen, college basketball coach for the University of Rhode Island and former player
- Marc Pelchat, Olympic speed skater
- Peter H. Reynolds, author and illustrator of children's books
- Jeffrey Snover, Microsoft Technical Fellow and inventor of PowerShell
- John Traphagan, anthropologist and author, Fulbright Scholar, professor emeritus at the University of Texas at Austin
- Lance Wilder, animator and longtime background designer on The Simpsons
