= Burlington High School (Massachusetts) =

Coordinates: 42.497°N 71.1973°W

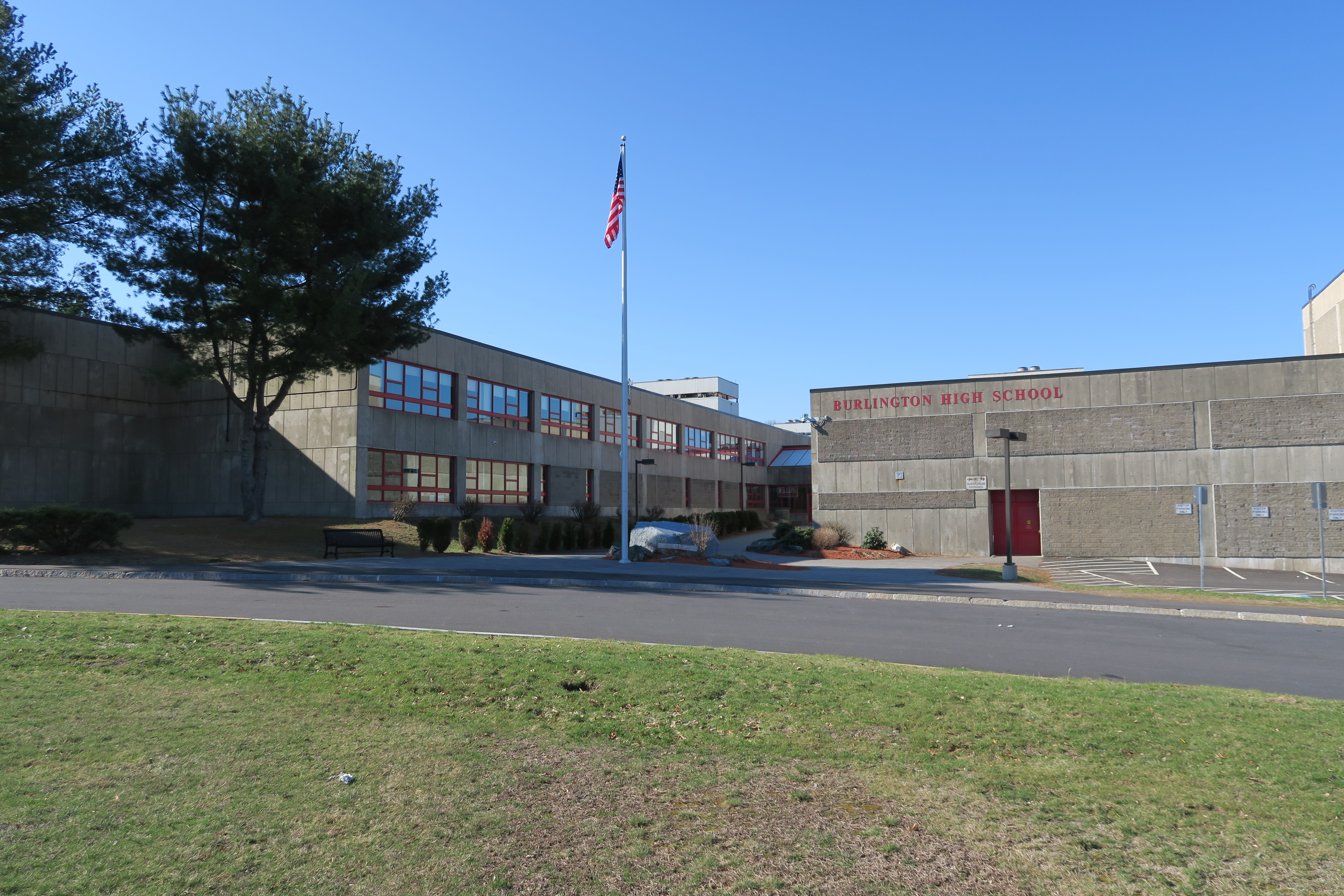
- Burlington High School

Location
- 123 Cambridge Street; Burlington, Massachusetts 01803; United States

Information
- School type: Public; Open enrollment
- Established: 1939 (current facility, 1973)
- School district: Burlington Public Schools
- NCES School ID: 250324000426
- Principal: Mark John Sullivan
- Teaching staff: 90.16 (FTE)
- Grades: 9–12
- Student to teacher ratio: 11.30
- Area: 365,000 ft^{2}
- Colors: Red, white and blue
- Nickname: Burlington Red Devils
- Rival: Woburn High School
- Accreditation: NEASC
- Publication: Collab (literary magazine)
- Newspaper: Devil’s Advocate
- Yearbook: Arrowhead
- Communities served: Town of Burlington
- Feeder schools: Marshall Simonds Middle School
- Nobel laureates: 1 (Roderick MacKinnon)
- Expenditure per student (school district): $16,643 (79 of 335 in MA) (2013)

Burlington High School is a four-year comprehensive high school located at 123 Cambridge Street in Burlington, Massachusetts. It is credited by the New England Association of Schools and Colleges.

Burlington High was one of 30 schools in the state of Massachusetts named to the AP Honor Roll by the College Board in 2011 for simultaneously increasing access to Advanced Placement coursework while maintaining or increasing the percentage of students earning scores of 3 or higher on AP exams.

Burlington High School was ranked #39 in the 2015 Boston Magazine rankings. This is up from their ranking of #67 in 2014. According to Boston Magazine, these rankings are based heavily on MCAS scores and schools are not contacted annually for updated data.

== Campus ==
The campus currently housing Burlington High School was opened in 1973 and is situated on 365,000 sq ft of land. Along with the grades 9–12 senior high school, the facilities on site are home to the school district's central administration offices, Burlington Cable Access TV, the Burlington Science Center, and the Burlington Early Childhood Center. As a result of facilitating the Early Childhood Center, Burlington High School includes pre-kindergarten and kindergarten demographic statistics to the Massachusetts Department of Education in their yearly reports, and these students are considered part of the high school's enrollment.

== Student demographics ==
According to Massachusetts Department of Elementary and Secondary Education annual statistics, for the 2025–2026 academic year, the demographic enrollment distributions for race, gender and grade level at Burlington High School (Massachusetts) are as follows:

Total number of enrolled students: 1000
Total number of full-time equivalent educators: 93.0
Therefore, the student to teacher ratio for this school is 10.8:1

Enrollment by Race/Ethnicity
Race	Pupils Enrolled*	Percentage
African American	96	9.6
Asian	204	20.4
Hispanic	122	12.2
Native American	2	0.2
White	545	54.5
Native Hawaiian, Pacific Islander	0	0.0
Multi-Race, Non-Hispanic	31	3.1

Enrollment by Gender
Gender	Pupils Enrolled	Percentage
Male	494	49.4
Female	504	50.4
Non-Binary	2	0.2

Enrollment by Grade
Grade	Pupils Enrolled	Percentage
PreK	87	8.7
K	0	0
9	219	21.9
10	243	24.3
11	231	23.1
12	219	21.9
SP**	1	0.1

* Approximate number calculated based on percentage of enrolled pupils.
** SP = Special Education Beyond Grade 12

== Performing arts ==
Burlington High School's performing arts are a culmination of efforts from the Burlington Public Schools' music department, various performance clubs, and the high school English department.

John E. Fogelberg Performing Arts Center is the primary performance space at Burlington High School. The auditorium is designed as a proscenium theatre. The stage is a wood floor.

Music

In May 2014, the Burlington High School Select Singers sang at Carnegie Hall in New York City as part of a festival with three other choruses from around the United States. The Burlington High School Chorus won gold at the 2010 Great East Music Festival, and the Select Singers won platinum at the same event. The music department also fields the Red Devil Marching Band and a concert band, as well as an extra-curricular jazz band. The singing groups, the concert band, and the jazz band have numerous concerts throughout the school year in the Fogelberg Performing Arts Center. The Red Devil Marching Band has performed at Disney World through the Disney Performing Arts Program many times, most recently in April 2013. The marching band also performs at all home and away varsity football games in the fall during halftime.

Drama

During the school year, two major theater productions are performed.

In December, a small-cast play is performed in the Fogelberg Performing Arts Center. Cast members are not required to be members of Drama Club. The tradition of a fall play began in the 2006–2007 school year. The first fall play was Fools, followed by The Importance of Being Earnest; Rumors; The Crucible; It's A Wonderful Life; Noises Off; A Midsummer Night's Dream; Arsenic and Old Lace; Almost, Maine; The Miracle Worker; Twelfth Night; and most recently Fahrenheit 451. The Stage Crew Club organizes a prep crew and running crew for the production, as well as providing a student stage manager and student technicians.

A full-scale musical is performed in March and April for two weekends. There is a large cast and crew, and professional set, lighting and costume designers are hired. The Stage Crew Club and parent volunteers construct the sets using the Fogelberg Performing Arts Center's shop space, and the club fields a crew of trained students to provide all technical support. Recent musicals include Jekyll & Hyde in 2005, Anything Goes in 2006, Les Misérables in 2007, Thoroughly Modern Millie (the first to run for more than one weekend) in 2008, The Wizard of Oz in 2009, Titanic in 2010, Disney's Beauty and the Beast in 2011, Kiss Me, Kate in 2012, Hairspray in 2013, Grease in 2014, The Music Man in 2015, Mary Poppins in 2016, Peter Pan in 2017, and Pippin in 2018.

== Sports ==
Burlington is a member of the Middlesex League. Among the school's most notable recent successes are the eight consecutive state championships for the cheerleading team (2004–2011), the two consecutive Division I hockey championships (2012–2013), the boys' gymnastics state championship in 2012, and the two state finals appearances in three years for the softball team (2011 & 2013). The boys' soccer team won the 2015 middlesex league title as well, setting a new school record for best regular season record (14-1-3).

Available sports (by season) at Burlington High School:

Fall

Sport	Recent highlights
Girls' swimming	
Boys' football	2006 Super Bowl finalists
Boys' Soccer	2015 Middlesex League champions
Girls' soccer	
Field hockey	
Boys' cross-country	2016 all state qualifiers
Girls' cross-country	
Cheerleading	2011 state champions
Golf	2011 league champions
Girls' volleyball	2016 state finalists

Winter

Sport	Recent highlights
Boys' basketball	2011 division semifinalists
Girls' basketball	2013 Middlesex League champions
Boys' hockey	2012 & 2013 - Div. 1 State champions
Girls' hockey	
Boys' swimming	Participated in Division 2 State Championship meet. Won 15th overall in the 200 individual medley.
Boys' indoor track	2016, 2015, 2014, 2013, 2012 league champions, 2017 state relay champions, 3rd at 2017 State
Girls' indoor track	2014 Middlesex League champions (first league championship in history) and 2015 Middlesex League champions
Wrestling	2012 two students in state finals, one state champion; 1983 New England champions; Tim Vadnais 2022 state champion, Cameron and Zachary Soda 2020 New England champions
Boys' gymnastics	2012 state champions
Girls' gymnastics	

Spring

Sport	Recent highlights
Baseball	2012 - Northern Mass. champions, state semifinalists
Softball	2013 & 2011 - Eastern Mass. champions, state finalists
Boys' lacrosse	2012 - tournament berth
Girls' lacrosse	2012 - Middlesex League champions
Boys' track & field	2016 & 2017 - ML Freedom champions, state relays champions, state champions
Girls' track & field	Casey Landry - state champion: triple jump
Boys' tennis'	2011 - division semifinalists
Girls' tennis	2011 - division semifinalists

== Notable alumni ==
- Kitty Carruthers, silver medalist, 1984 Winter Olympics, pairs figure skating
- Peter Carruthers, silver medalist, 1984 Winter Olympics, pairs figure skating
- Bob Ganley, city manager
- David Lovering, drummer for The Pixies
- Roderick MacKinnon, Nobel Prize winner
- Jay Pandolfo, ice hockey player, forward for the Boston Bruins
- Amy Poehler, actress, comedian, and former Saturday Night Live cast member
- Greg Poehler, actor and comedian
- Nithya Raman, Mayor-Elect of Los Angeles
- Steve Strachan, NFL running back
- Steven Wright, comedian
