= Billerica Memorial High School =

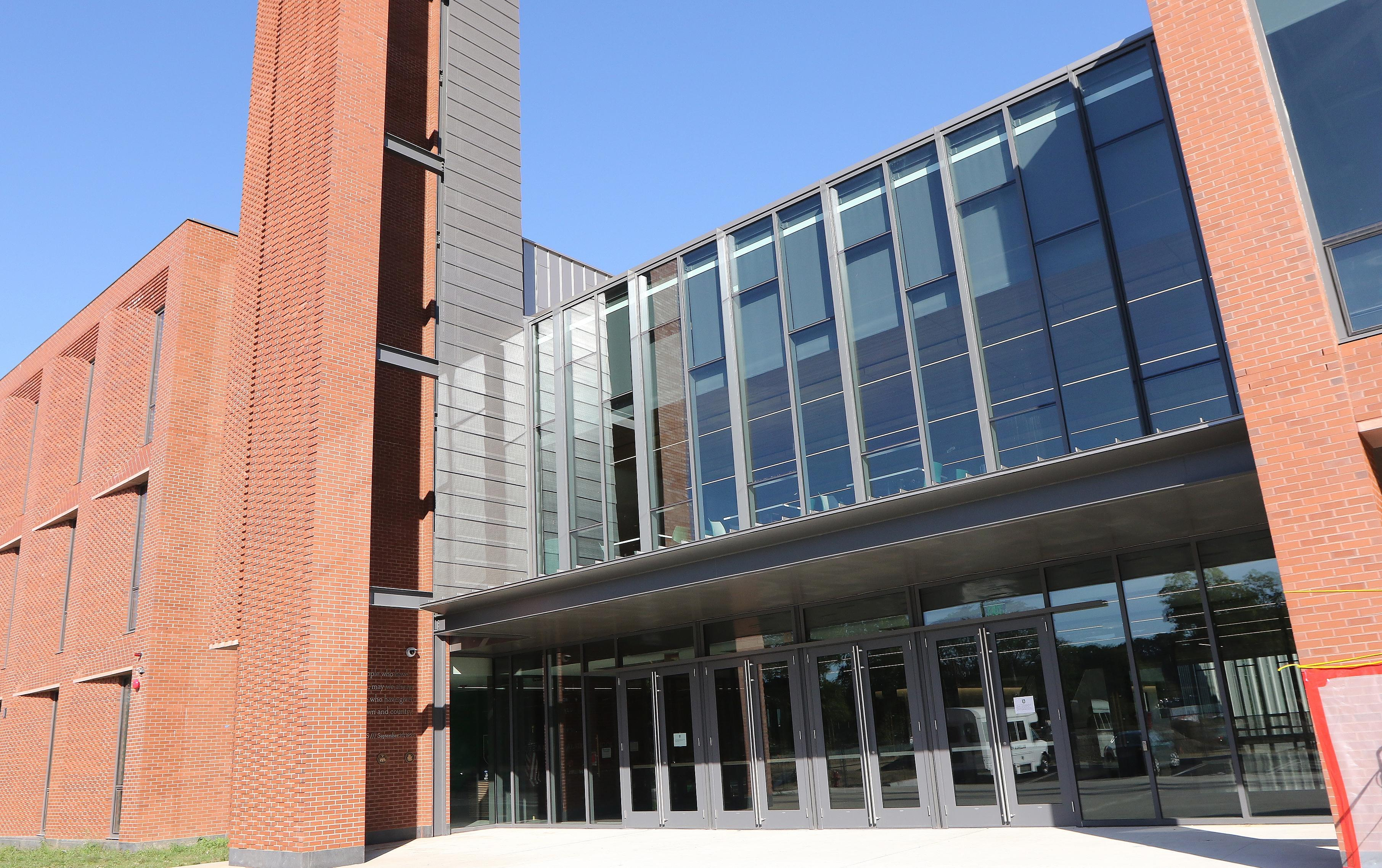

Location
- 35 River Street; Billerica, Massachusetts 01821; United States; 42°33′40″N 71°16′23″W

Information
- Type: Public
- Motto: Respect, Individuality, Community, and Enrichment
- Established: 1916 as Howe High School; 1955 as BMHS
- School district: Billerica Public Schools
- Principal: Thomas R. Murphy
- Teaching staff: 128.28 (FTE)
- Grades: 8 to 12
- Enrollment: 1,821 (2023–2024)
- Student to teacher ratio: 14.18
- Colors: Forest green and white
- Athletics conference: Merrimack Valley Conference (MVC)
- Mascot: Indian Head
- Nickname: BMHS
- Team name: Indians
- Rival: Chelmsford High School (Chelmsford, Massachusetts)
- Newspaper: The Billerica Beat
- Website: billericak12.com/bmhs

Billerica Memorial High School (BMHS), formerly Howe High School, is a public secondary school in the town of Billerica, Massachusetts, United States. It is the only high school under the purview of the Billerica Public Schools district, and serves approximately 1,600 students between grades 8 and 12. The school is supervised by a district superintendent who reports to an elected school committee for the town. As of June 2025, Thomas Murphy, an alumnus of BMHS, is the school's principal. The administration consists of assistant principals responsible for a specific grade-year. In athletics, Billerica's arch-rival is Chelmsford High School. The colors of BMHS are green and white, and the school's emblem is the Indian Head.

== History ==
=== Early education in Billerica ===
Shortly after the foundation of Billerica in 1655, the town made plans to ensure education for its young residents. The first schoolmaster of Billerica was Joseph Tompson. His private room was the first classroom. As the town of Billerica grew in the 18th century, other schoolmasters were hired.

In 1794 Ebenezer Pemberton opened the first private school in Billerica, Pemberton Academy. He was considered one of the most notable teachers of his time, and had previously taught James Madison and Aaron Burr. The academy closed in 1808. Another private school was established in 1820, known as Billerica Academy, and classes were held in an old hotel. It also found itself closed in 1836. Reverend Stearns then tried to pick up the burden of higher education by teaching classes in his church, but this school also eventually closed.

=== Howe School and Howe High School ===
The first official high school under town control was established in 1851 (although the town did not officially control it until 1916). It was named Howe School after its founder, Dr. Zadok Howe. He funded the building of the school, but died before construction was completed. His estate ran the school, free of charge to Billerica residents. It took in students from all over New England and some from as far away as Illinois. The total enrollment was 46 boys and 42 girls, with the senior class graduating a total of six students (four boys and two girls).

In 1896, the Town of Billerica officially named the school as the town's high school as was mandated by law. It was also in that same year that a group of alumni from the school founded an association that is still active today: The Howe High School/Billerica Memorial High School Alumni Association. This is the second oldest active high school alumni group in the Commonwealth of Massachusetts behind the Alumni Association to the Boston Latin School.

When Howe's estate announced, in 1915, that free tuition would end for Billerica students, the town took over the school.

The Howe School soon became overpopulated and the town was forced to rent out rooms in houses opposite the building. The principal at this time was Mr. Vining. He himself taught six classes a day. The superintendent at the time was Arthur B. Webber.

In 1914, the overpopulation of the Howe School became a serious problem for the town. A suggestion was then made to erect a new high school. It was brought to the Town Finance Committee. The committee eventually voted to recommend the building of a new high school to cost no more than $90,000. The town issued 20-year, four percent serial bonds to this amount. In September 1916, the new Howe High School was open across the street from the original Howe School.

=== Billerica Memorial High School ===
Billerica Memorial High School was officially opened on September 26, 1955. The school opened with Philip G. Hines as superintendent of schools and Royal S. Adams as the principal. In 1955 the high school received 700 students as well as four groups of elementary students. The total cost to build this new institution was approximately $2,425,000. Shortly after its opening, the Billerica school again became overpopulated. A suggestion was made to build an addition to the building. Billerica Memorial High School then added a new addition in September 1974. The cost of this addition was approximately $15,469,000. This addition provided 90 additional rooms. The superintendent was William Flaherty, and the principal was William Archambault.

Over time, the building started to become extremely outdated. The structure was starting to fall apart, and ceiling tiles had fallen in classrooms, posing a threat to students. The old building contained asbestos, and there are multiple anecdotes from students and staff that the old building contained mice and rats, and occasionally had problems with its heating system in the winter. A need for a new high school was brought to attention, and in March 2016, a plan was approved by the town to demolish the Billerica Memorial High School and build a new one on the same site. Work began in February 2017, and the cost to build the new school was around $176 million. The school opened on September 3, 2019, with Tim Piwowar as superintendent and Tom Murphy as principal.

== Facilities ==
BMHS formerly consisted of two buildings: the Old Building (a.k.a. Memorial Building) and a new building known as "The New Addition". The New Addition was added to the original building in 1974, but it was built as a free-standing structure. Because of this, there were two gyms and two cafeterias. Only the cafeteria in the New Building was in use. There was one auditorium; it was in the Old Building. Each building had three floors, but only the top two floors of the Old Building were used by the school. The lower floor was used by the school department for a preschool for special-needs children, as well as storage for the drama program's set materials and costumes. The new building has been constructed, built by Shawmut Construction and designed by the architectural firm Perkins + Will. It was completed in 2019, and the first year of classes began then but was later interrupted due to the 2019 novel coronavirus disease. Following the summer of 2020, demolition of the old building had been completed, and the new football field and track were constructed in its place. The new building is four stories tall, with part of the bottom floor still hosting Project Support, the aforementioned preschool.

== Student demographics ==
According to Massachusetts Department of Elementary and Secondary Education annual statistics, for the 2020–2021 academic year, the demographic enrollment distributions for race, gender and grade level at Billerica Memorial High School are as follows:

Total number of enrolled students: 1,605
Total number of full-time equivalent educators: 130.5
Therefore, the student to teacher ratio for this school is 12.3:1

Enrollment by Race/Ethnicity
Race	Pupils Enrolled*	Percentage
African American	100	6.2
Asian	143	8.9
Hispanic	114	7.1
Native American	3	0.2
White	1,207	75.2
Native Hawaiian, Pacific Islander	3	0.2
Multi-Race, Non-Hispanic	35	2.2

Enrollment by Gender
Gender	Pupils Enrolled	Percentage
Male	805	50.16
Female	799	49.78
Non-Binary	1	0.06

Enrollment by Grade
Grade	Pupils Enrolled	Percentage
8	403	25.11
9	266	16.57
10	279	17.38
11	302	18.82
12	239	14.89
SP**	0	0

* Approximate number calculated based on percentage of enrolled pupils.
** SP = Special Education Beyond Grade 12

== Athletics ==
Billerica Memorial High School has a variety of teams that compete in the Merrimack Valley Conference. The sports include:

- Baseball (boys' varsity, JV, freshman)
- Basketball (boys' and girls' varsity, JV, freshman)
- Cheerleading (girls' varsity, JV)
- Cross country (boys' and girls' varsity)
- Football (boys' varsity, JV, freshman)
- Golf (boys' varsity)
- Gymnastics (girls' varsity)
- Ice hockey (boys' varsity, JV, girls' varsity)
- Indoor track (boys' and girls' varsity)
- Lacrosse (boys' and girls' varsity, JV, freshman)
- Outdoor track (boys' and girls' varsity)
- Soccer (boys' and girls' varsity, JVA, JVB)
- Softball (girls' varsity, JV, freshman)
- Swimming (varsity)
- Tennis (boys' and girls' varsity)
- Volleyball (girls' varsity, JV, freshman, boys' varsity, JV)
- Wrestling (boys' varsity)

== Notable alumni ==
- Mike Balas, Major League Baseball player
- Gary Disarcina (class of 1985), Major League Baseball player
- Tom Glavine (class of 1984), Major League Baseball player
- James McCluskey (class of 2006), National Football League player
