= Woburn Memorial High School =

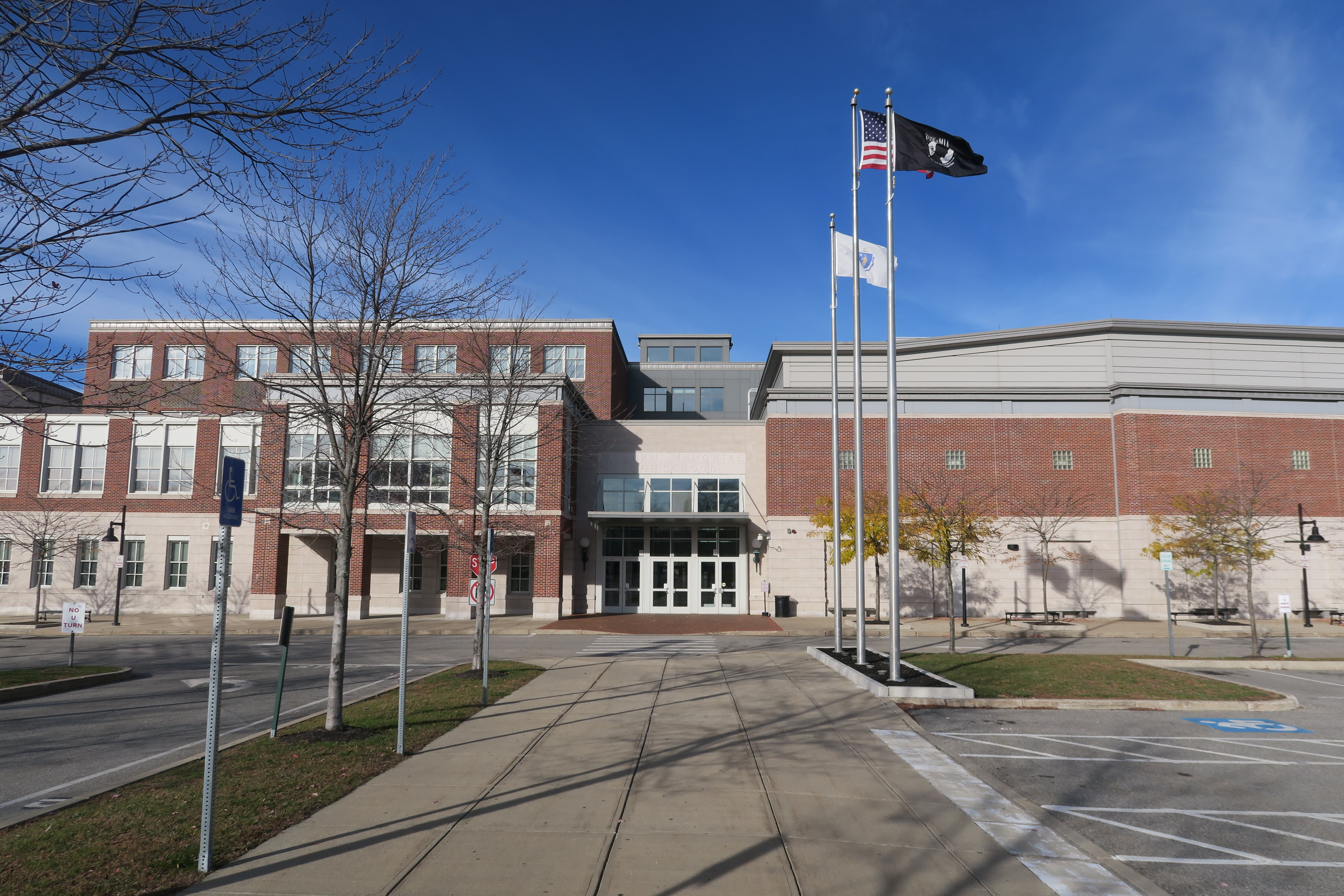

Location
- 88 Montvale Avenue; Woburn, Massachusetts 01801; United States; 42°28′59.3″N 71°8′36.8″W

Information
- Other name: WMHS
- Type: Public high school
- Established: 1852; 174 years ago
- School district: Woburn Public Schools
- NCES School ID: 251320002193
- Principal: Daniel Rasanen
- Teaching staff: 112.04 (on an FTE basis)
- Grades: 9–12
- Enrollment: 1,259 (2024-2025)
- Student to teacher ratio: 11.24
- Colors: Black and orange
- Athletics conference: Middlesex League
- Mascot: Bull
- Nickname: Tanners
- Rival: Burlington High School Winchester High School
- Accreditation: New England Association of Schools and Colleges
- Website: woburnps.com/woburn-memorial

Woburn Memorial High School (WMHS) is a public high school in Woburn, Massachusetts, United States. It is part of the Woburn Public Schools district and participates in the Middlesex League. It is home to the Tanners and Tannerettes and the nickname "Tanners" has a historical context. In the late 19th century, Woburn was one of the biggest producers of leather in the New England area. The shops that produced leather were called tanneries, hence the nickname Tanners.

== Academics ==
All students enrolled in Woburn Memorial High School are subject to MCAS testing when required. As of spring 2014, within the English and Language Arts category, 40% of students were Advanced, compared to a 41% statewide, 51% were proficient, compared to 49% statewide. 7% were classified as needing improvement compared to an 8% statewide, and 2% failed, compared to 2% statewide. Within the Mathematics category, 46% of students were classified as Advanced, compared to 53% statewide, 30% were proficient, compared to 26% statewide, 17% needed improvement, compared to 15% statewide. 6% failed, compared to 6% statewide. Within the Science and Technology/Engineering category, 25% of students were advanced, compared to 29% statewide. 42% were proficient, compared to 42% statewide, 29% of students needed improvement, compared to 24% statewide. 4% failed, comparable to 5% statewide.

== History ==
- 1852: The first Woburn High School opened above a store on Main Street
- 1906: The original building, known to most as building 7, of the "old Woburn High" was constructed
- 1930s: The wings on building 7 were constructed
- 1986: Girls Varsity Basketball Team wins Middlesex League Title
- 1999: Boys Golf Team wins State Championship
- 2000-2001: Boys' Soccer and Golf Teams win State Championships; Boys' Wrestling Team win Middlesex League, Middlesex Tournament, Sectional, State and All-State Titles.
- 2002: Boys Golf Team wins State Championship
- 2006: The new Woburn Memorial High School building opens in September for the 2006-2007 school year
- 2008: Boys' 4 x 400 relay team wins national title.
- 2019: Baseball team wins first Middlesex League title in 41 years and reaches MIAA Division 2 North finals.

== Notable alumni ==
- Eric Bogosian, actor, playwright, monologuist, novelist, and historian
- Jocko Conlon, professional baseball player
- Charles McMahon, Marine Corporal, last casualty in Vietnam War
- David Robinson, rock drummer
- John Carter, professional ice hockey player
- Ken Weafer, Major League Baseball pitcher
