= Braintree =

Braintree may refer to:

== Places ==
- Braintree, Essex, a town in England
  - Braintree District
  - Braintree (UK Parliament constituency)
  - Braintree Town F.C., a football club in the town
- Braintree, Massachusetts, U.S., a city
  - Braintree High School, a high school in the city
- New Braintree, Massachusetts, U.S., a town
- Braintree, Vermont, U.S., a town

== Transportation ==
- Braintree Airport, in Braintree, Massachusetts, United States (closed 1970)
- Braintree railway station (England), in Braintree, Essex, England
- Braintree station (MBTA), in Braintree, Massachusetts, United States

== Other uses ==
- Braintree (company), a payments service provider based in Chicago, Illinois, United States
