= South Middle School =

South Middle School may refer to:

- South Middle School (West Virginia)
- South Middle School (Illinois)
- South Middle School in Eau Claire, Wisconsin, one of the three middle schools there.
- South Middle School in Liberal, Kansas that is one of the two middle schools there.
- South Middle School (Braintree, Massachusetts), Braintree, Massachusetts
- South Middle School (Lancaster, South Carolina), Lancaster, South Carolina
