= Anthony Devaney =

American electrical engineer (1940–2026)

- Born: Anthony J. Devaney; February 1, 1940; Braintree, Massachusetts, U.S.
- Died: August 18, 2026 (aged 86)
- Education: Northeastern University; Yale University; University of Rochester
- Occupation: Electrical engineer
- Spouse: Amy E. Johnson

Anthony J. Devaney (February 1, 1940 – August 18, 2026) was an American electrical engineer.

== Early life and career ==
Devaney was raised in Braintree, Massachusetts on February 1, 1940, the son of Anthony Devaney Sr., a pressman for the The Herald Traveler, and Claire Diauto, a teacher. He attended Braintree High School, graduating in 1959. After graduating, he attended Northeastern University, earning his undergraduate degree. He also attended Yale University, earning his master's degree in electrical engineering, and his PhD degree at the University of Rochester in 1971, which after earning his degrees, he worked at Schlumberger-Doll Research in Ridgefield, Connecticut.

He served as a professor in the department of electrical and computer engineering at Northeastern University from 1987 to 2016. During his years as a professor, he was named the COE Distinguished Professor.

== Personal life and death ==
Devaney was married to Amy E. Johnson. Their marriage lasted until Devaney's death in 2026.

Devaney died on August 18, 2026, at the age of 86.
