= Ross Elementary School =

Ross Elementary School can refer to:

- Ross Elementary School (Abbotsford, British Columbia)
- Ross Elementary School (Braintree, Massachusetts)
- Ross Elementary School (Houston, Texas)
- Ross Elementary School (Washington, D.C.)
- Ernest L. Ross Elementary School, Cleveland, Tennessee
