= Sylvanus Thayer =

United States Army general (1785–1872)

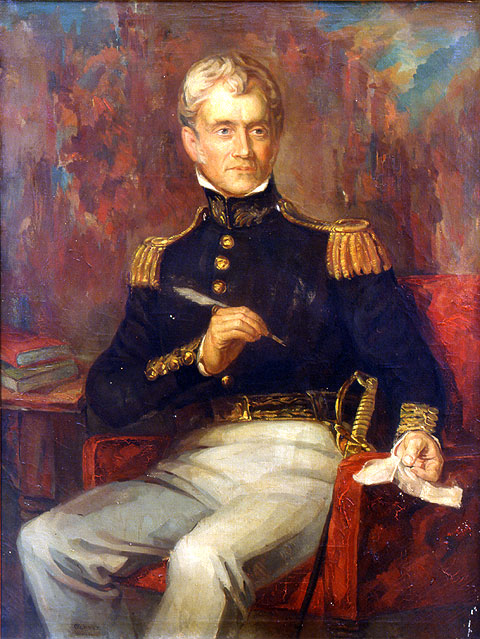
- Sylvanus Thayer, painting by Robert Weir
- Born: June 9, 1785; Braintree, Massachusetts, U.S.
- Died: September 7, 1872 (aged 87); Braintree, Massachusetts, U.S.
- Burial place: West Point Cemetery, West Point, New York
- Military career
- Allegiance: United States
- Branch: United States Army
- Service years: 1808 – 1863
- Rank: Colonel; Brevet brigadier general
- Nickname: "Father of the Military Academy"
- Commands: Superintendent of the United States Military Academy
- Conflicts: War of 1812; Battle of the Chateauguay

Sylvanus Thayer (June 9, 1785 – September 7, 1872) was an American military officer, engineer and educator who served as the fifth superintendent of the United States Military Academy at West Point from 1817 to 1833. He is remembered as the "Father of the Military Academy" for reforming the institution to its current standards, and was an early advocate of engineering education in the United States.

== Early life and education ==
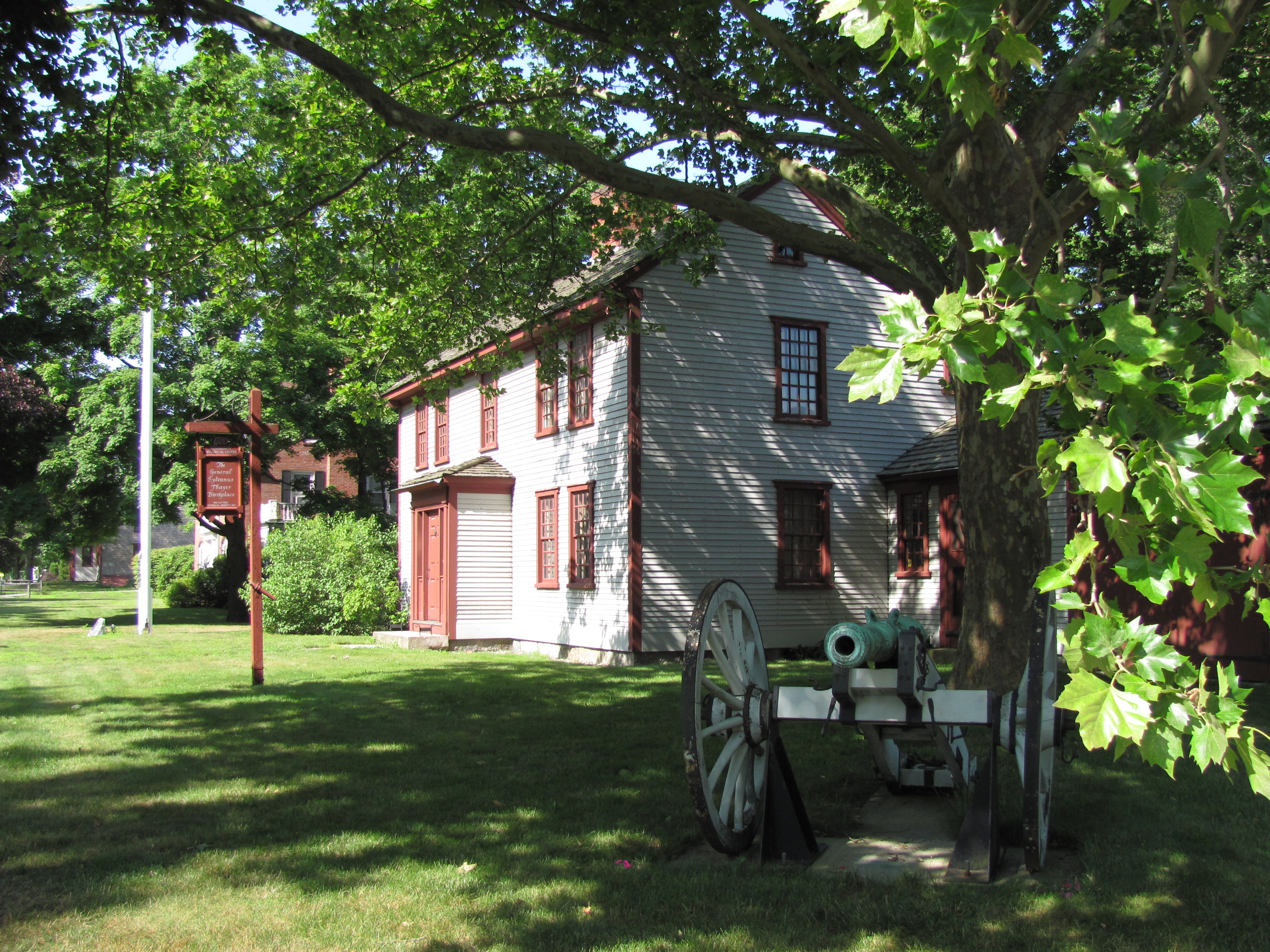
Thayer's birthplace in Braintree, Massachusetts

Sylvanus Thayer was born in Braintree, Massachusetts, the son of Nathaniel Thayer, a gentleman farmer, and his wife Dorcas Faxon. In 1793, at the age of 8, Thayer was sent to live with his uncle Azariah Faxon and attend school in Washington, New Hampshire. There he met General Benjamin Pierce, who, like Faxon, was a veteran of the Revolutionary War. In 1803 Thayer matriculated at Dartmouth College, graduating in 1807 as valedictorian of his class. However, he never gave the valedictory address at Dartmouth, having been granted an appointment to West Point by President Thomas Jefferson at the behest of General Pierce. Thayer graduated from the United States Military Academy after a single year and received his commission as a second lieutenant in 1808. His first assignment was to supervise the construction of Fort Warren (later renamed Fort Winthrop) in Boston Harbor, foreshadowing the bulk of his later career.

During the War of 1812, Thayer directed the fortification and defense of Norfolk, Virginia, and was promoted to major. In 1815, he was provided $5,000 to travel to Europe, where he studied for two years at the French École Polytechnique. While traveling in Europe he amassed a collection of science and especially mathematics texts that now form a valuable collection for historians of mathematics.

== Superintendent of West Point ==
In 1817, President James Monroe ordered Thayer to West Point to become superintendent of the Military Academy following the resignation of Captain Alden Partridge. Under his stewardship, the Academy became the nation's first college of engineering.

While at West Point Thayer established numerous traditions and policies which are still in use in the present day. These include the values of honor and responsibility, strict mental and physical discipline, the demerit system, summer encampment, high academic standards and the requirement that cadets maintain outstanding military bearing and appearance at all times.

One of Thayer's reforms was to establish a standard four year curriculum with the cadets organized into four classes. Starting with the Class of 1823, July 1 was the date each year when the graduating class was commissioned and the entering class was sworn in. The graduation date was moved up to June 15 starting in 1861.

Many of the cadets who attended West Point during Thayer's tenure held key leadership positions during the Mexican War and American Civil War.

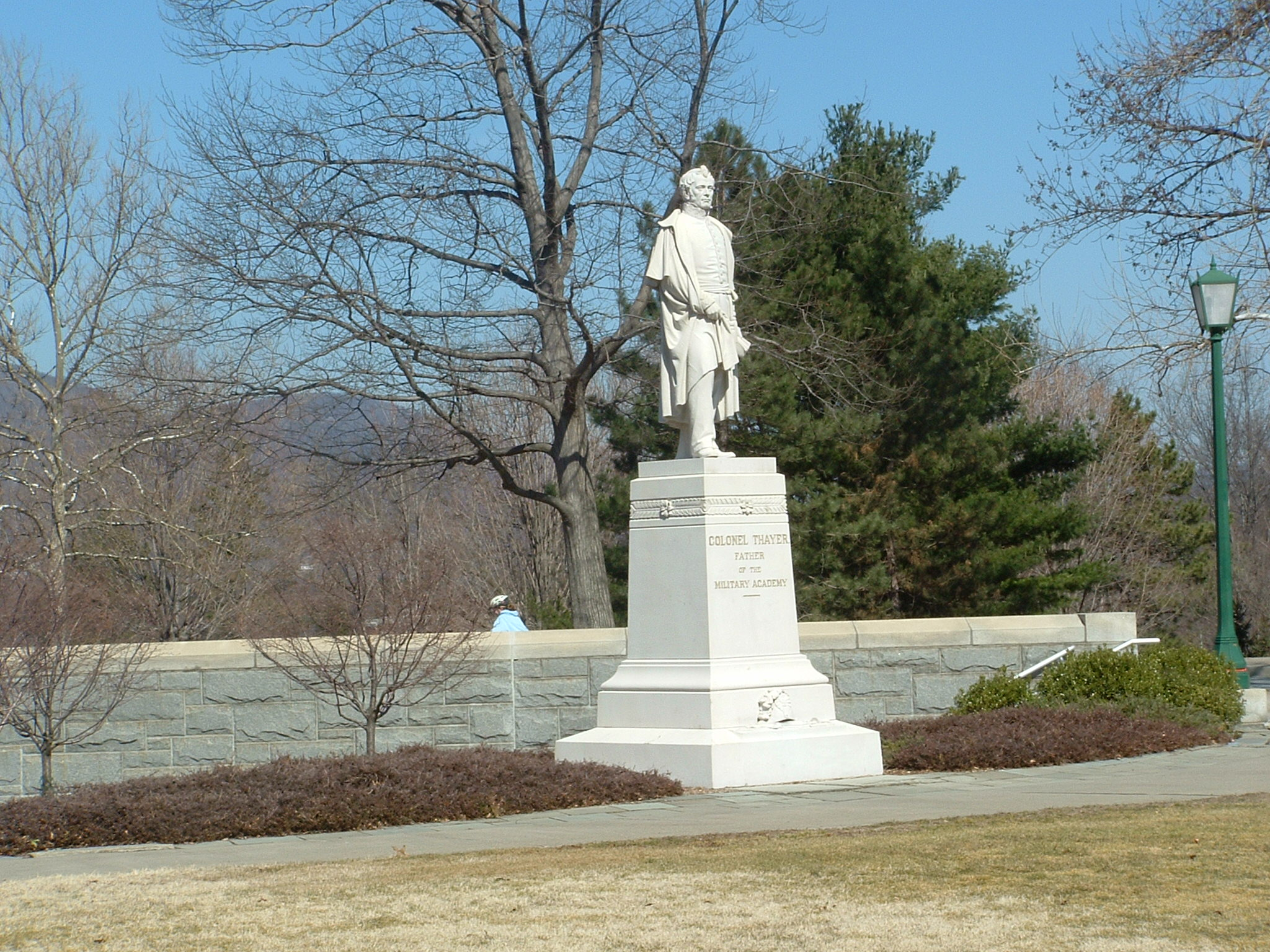
Statue and Memorial to Sylvanus Thayer at West Point

== Later career ==
Colonel Thayer's time at West Point ended with his resignation in 1833, after a disagreement with President Andrew Jackson. He was elected an Associate Fellow of the American Academy of Arts and Sciences in 1834.

Thayer returned to duty with the Army Corps of Engineers. Thayer spent the great majority of the next 30 years as the chief engineer for the Boston area. During this time he oversaw the construction of both Fort Warren and Fort Independence to defend Boston Harbor. Thayer's great engineering ability can be observed in both of the above-mentioned forts. He was elected as a member of the American Philosophical Society in 1838.

Thayer was a member of the Board of Engineers for Coast Defenses, April 2, 1833, to December 21, 1857, and was President of the Board from Dec. 7, 1838. He temporarily commanded of the Corps of Engineers from December 21, 1857, to December 22, 1858, while its commander, Colonel Joseph G. Totten, was on a leave of absence. In December 1858 Thayer was placed on an extended sick leave of absence. He did not play an active role in the American Civil War.

In August 1861, Fort Thayer, an earthwork fort part of the Civil War Defenses of Washington, DC, was built and named in his honor.

Thayer retired from the Army on June 1, 1863, with the rank of colonel in the Corps of Engineers. He was retired under the first act regulating the retirement of Army officers which required the retirement of any officer with more than 45 years of service.

== Death and legacy ==
In 1869, as a result of Thayer's enduring legacy at the United States Military Academy, a meeting took place in Braintree between Thayer and the West Point graduate and Civil War hero Brigadier General Robert Anderson. An outcome of Anderson's 1869 meeting with Thayer was the establishment of the Military Academy's Association of Graduates (AoG).

In 1867, Thayer donated $40,000 to the trustees of Dartmouth College to create the Thayer School of Engineering. Thayer personally located and recommended USMA graduate Lieutenant Robert Fletcher to Dartmouth president Asa Dodge Smith. Fletcher became the school's first—then only—professor and dean.

The Thayer School admitted its first three students to a graduate program in 1871. Also in 1871 at the bequest of his will Thayer Academy in Braintree, Massachusetts, was conceived. It opened September 12, 1877.

Thayer died on September 7, 1872, at his home in Braintree. He was reinterred at West Point Cemetery in 1877. Thayer's obituary appeared in the New York Times on September 8, 1872.

== Works ==
Thayer's papers and manuscripts are divided between the U.S. Military Academy Library, West Point, New York, and the Dartmouth College Library, Hanover, New Hampshire.

== Honours, decorations, awards, and distinctions ==
In 1852 herpetologists Spencer Fullerton Baird and Charles Frédéric Girard of the Smithsonian Institution named a species of lizard in honor of Thayer, Sceloporus thayeri, which was later placed in the synonymy of Sceloporus undulatus hyacinthinus.

On April 21, 1864, President Abraham Lincoln nominated Thayer for the award of the honorary grade of brevet brigadier general, United States Army (Regular Army), to rank from May 31, 1863, the day before he retired, for long and faithful service. The U.S. Senate confirmed the award on April 27, 1864.

To honor his achievements, in 1958, the Sylvanus Thayer Award was created by the United States Military Academy. He has been honored by the United States Postal Service with a 9¢ Great Americans series postage stamp.

Thayer Street, in the Inwood, Manhattan section of New York City, is named after him.

The house where Thayer was born in Braintree, Massachusetts is preserved and open to the public.

Sculptor Joseph Kiselewski created a thirty-two inch bust of Sylvanus Thayer for the Hall of Fame for Great Americans at New York University in the Bronx, New York City. It was installed in 1966.

The Pale Blue Eye (2022) is a film adaptation of the 2003 novel by Louis Bayard featuring Timothy Spall as Thayer.

== Dates of rank ==
=== United States Army ===
Date	Insignia	Rank	Brevet Promotions
March 20, 1807		Cadet	
February 23, 1808		Second lieutenant	
July 1, 1812		First lieutenant	
September 22, 1812		Captain	Bvt. Major (1815) (Note: February 20, 1815, for distinguished and meritorious service in the defense of Norfolk during the War of 1812.); Bvt. Lieutenant colonel (1823) (Note: March 3, 1823, for distinguished and meritorious service at the U.S. Military Academy.)
May 24, 1828		Major	Bvt. Colonel (1833) (Note: March 3, 1833, for ten years faithful service in one grade.)
July 7, 1838		Lieutenant colonel	
March 3, 1863		Colonel	Bvt. Brigadier general (1863) (Note: May 31, 1863, for long and faithful service.)
June 1, 1863	Placed on the retired list with the rank of colonel (died September 7, 1872).		

== Bibliography ==
- Stephen E. Ambrose, Duty, Honor, Country: A History of West Point (1966)
- Thomas J. Fleming, West Point: The Men and Times of the United States Military Academy (1969)
- James L. Morrison Jr., "The Best School in the World": West Point, the Pre-Civil War Years, 1833–1866 (1986)
- George S. Pappas, To the Point: The United States Military Academy, 1802–1902 (1993).

== See also ==
- Thayer family
- Gen. Sylvanus Thayer House
- Thayer School of Engineering
- Thayer Academy
- Thayer Public Library
- Thayer Hotel

== Notes ==
Military offices
Preceded by Alden Partridge	Superintendents of the United States Military Academy; 1817–1833	Succeeded by René Edward De Russy
