= Braintree High School =

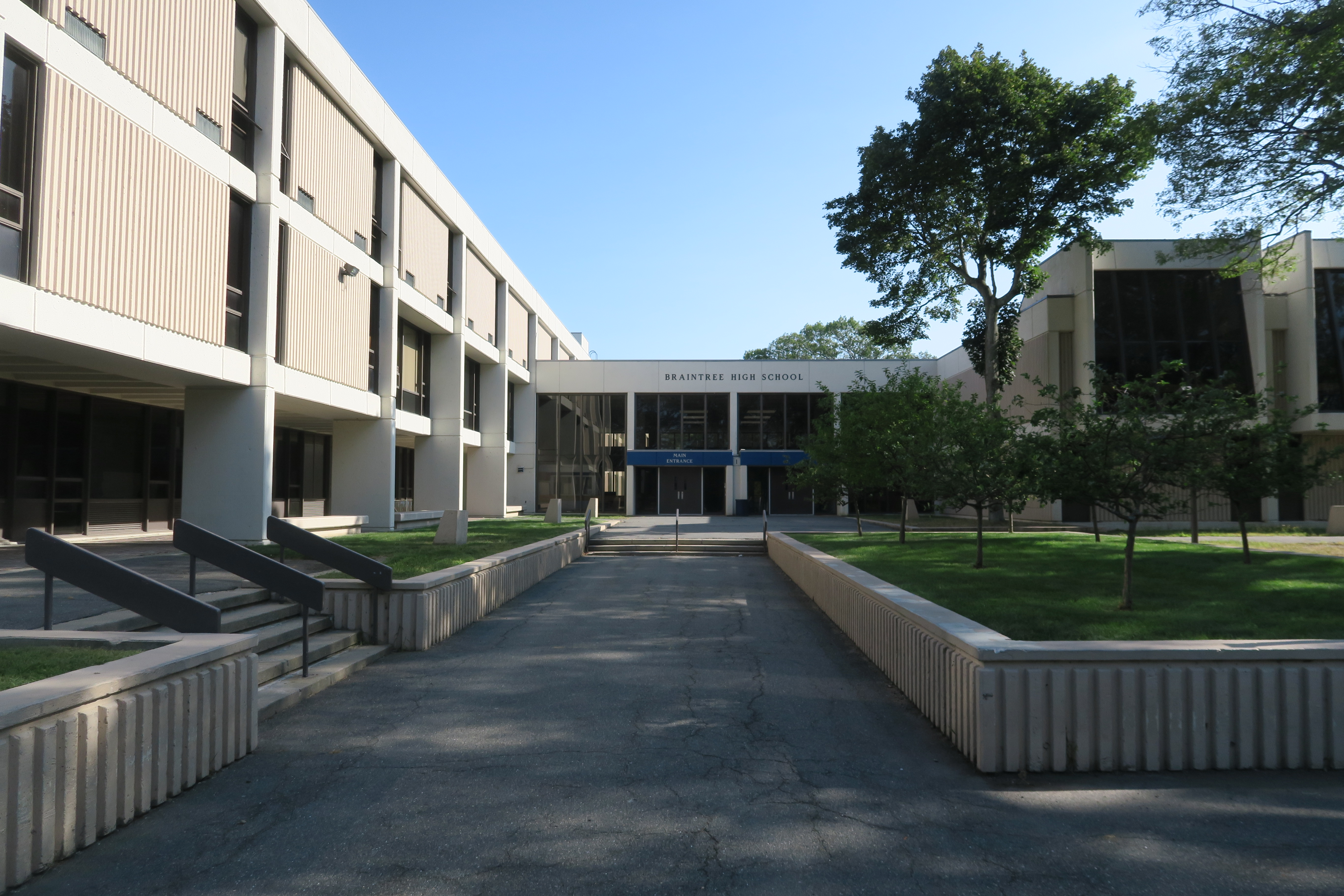
- Braintree High School

Location
- 128 Town Street; Braintree, Norfolk County, Massachusetts 02184; United States; 42°12′15″N 71°01′12″W

Information
- School type: Public high school
- Established: 1858 1927 (Old), 1972 (New)
- Status: Currently operational
- School district: Braintree Public Schools
- NCES District ID: 2502940
- Superintendent: Frank Hackett
- CEEB code: 220420
- NCES School ID: 250294000361
- Headmaster: Christopher Scully
- Faculty: 116
- Grades: PK, 9-12
- Gender: Coeducational
- Enrollment: 1,677 (2023–2024)
- Student to teacher ratio: 16:1
- Colors: Blue and White
- Slogan: "Once a Wamp, Always a Wamp"
- Athletics conference: MIAA – District C Bay State Conference
- Mascot: Wamp
- Nickname: Braintree Wamps
- Rival: Milton Wildcats, Weymouth Wildcats
- Accreditation: NEASC
- National ranking: 4th
- Yearbook: Wampatuck
- Communities served: Braintree
- Feeder schools: South Middle School, East Middle School
- School Store: The Wamp Stop
- Website: www.braintreeschools.org/schools/bhs

Braintree High School (BHS) is a four-year public secondary school located in Braintree, Massachusetts. The school is part of the Braintree Public School district and is situated on the northwest side of Sunset Lake at 128 Town Street.

== General ==
Braintree's school colors are blue and white. The building is considered an example of Brutalist architecture. The old site of Braintree High School, located at the intersection of West Street and Washington Street, opened in 1927. The current site of Braintree High School, located adjacent to Sunset Lake, opened in 1972. As of the 2019–20 school year, the Principal of BHS is Christopher Scully.

== Demographics ==
According to Massachusetts Department of Elementary and Secondary Education annual statistics, for the 2018-2019 academic year, the demographic enrollment distributions for race, gender and grade level at Braintree High School are as follows:

Total number of enrolled students: 1,793
Total number of full-time equivalent educators: 116.1
Therefore, the student to teacher ratio for this school is 15.4:1

Enrollment by Race/Ethnicity (2018-2019)
Race	Enrolled Pupils*	% of District
African American	106	5.9%
Asian	402	22.4%
Hispanic	109	6.1%
Native American	2	0.1%
White	1,142	63.7%
Native Hawaiian, Pacific Islander	4	0.2%
Multi-Race, Non-Hispanic	29	1.6%
Total	1,793	100%

* Approximate number of enrolled pupils is calculated based on total number of students in district, multiplied by reported percentage, and rounded to nearest whole student.

Enrollment by gender (2018-2019)
Gender	Enrolled pupils	Percentage
Female	859	47.91%
Male	868	48.41%
Non-binary	0	0%
Total	1,793	100%

Enrollment by Grade
Grade	Pupils Enrolled	Percentage
9	422	23.54%
10	376	20.97%
11	413	23.03%
12	424	23.65%
SP*	16	0.89%
Total	1,793	100%

* SP = Special Education Beyond Grade 12

== Athletics ==
Braintree High is a member of the Bay State Conference, a league in District C of the Massachusetts Interscholastic Athletic Association. They have traditional rivalries with Milton High School, including the annual football game on Thanksgiving Day, and Weymouth High School. Recently the Boys' Gymnastics squad has consistently repeated as champions of the BSC while the Cheerleading squad competes on the national stage. There have been several other state champions produced by BHS in the past several years, most notably in girls' athletics. The Lady Wamps Basketball team won the state title for the 2005–06 fall season, while the Soccer team won in both 2005 and again in 2006. The boys ice hockey team made its first appearance in the Super 8 Ice Hockey Tournament in 2014, but lost to Catholic Memorial School in the play-in game, 2–1. In back-to-back years the Girls Basketball team won state championships in 2014 and went undefeated in 2015.
The Braintree High Dance Team has dominated conference and state championships for over a decade, including multiple New England championships.
The Varsity baseball team won the Super Eight baseball tournament in 2015, after previously losing to Newton North High School in 2014s final. The Wamps beat St. John's Preparatory School 7–3 after dropping the first game 20–4.

The name of the field that Braintree Baseball plays at is Veterans Stadium. The football team and occasionally the soccer and lacrosse teams play at an artificial turf field named Alumni Stadium. The Braintree High gymnasium is named H. Fred Hegret Gymnasium. The golf team plays its home events at Braintree Municipal Golf Course. The gymnastics room is named Shuhwerk Gymnastics Room. The Braintree Athletic Complex is a planned athletic complex that will be located at Braintree High School.

== Notable alumni ==
- Amy Bishop (Class of 1983), perpetrator of the 2010 University of Alabama in Huntsville shooting
- Nick Barese, baseball coach and former pitcher
- Kevin Buckley (Class of 1977), former MLB player (Texas Rangers)
- Jim Calhoun (Class of 1960), former coach of Connecticut Huskies men's basketball
- Mark Cusack (Class of 2003), politician
- Bob Dee (Class of 1953), former NFL player, Boston Patriots
- Chris Doherty (Class of 1983), lead singer of the band Gang Green
- Peter Kormann, Olympic gymnast/Bronze medalist
- Gerry McDonald, former NHL player
- Boo Morcom, Olympic pole vaulter, masters world record holder
- John O'Keefe, Boston police officer
- Nick Santino (Class of 2006), lead singer and guitarist for Beach Weather and former frontman of A Rocket to the Moon
- Butch Stearns (Class of 1978), WFXT-TV (Fox-25) Sports Anchor Sun-Thursday
- Joseph Sullivan (Class of 1977), former mayor of the Town of Braintree
