= 2010 University of Alabama in Huntsville shooting =

Mass shooting in Alabama, U.S.

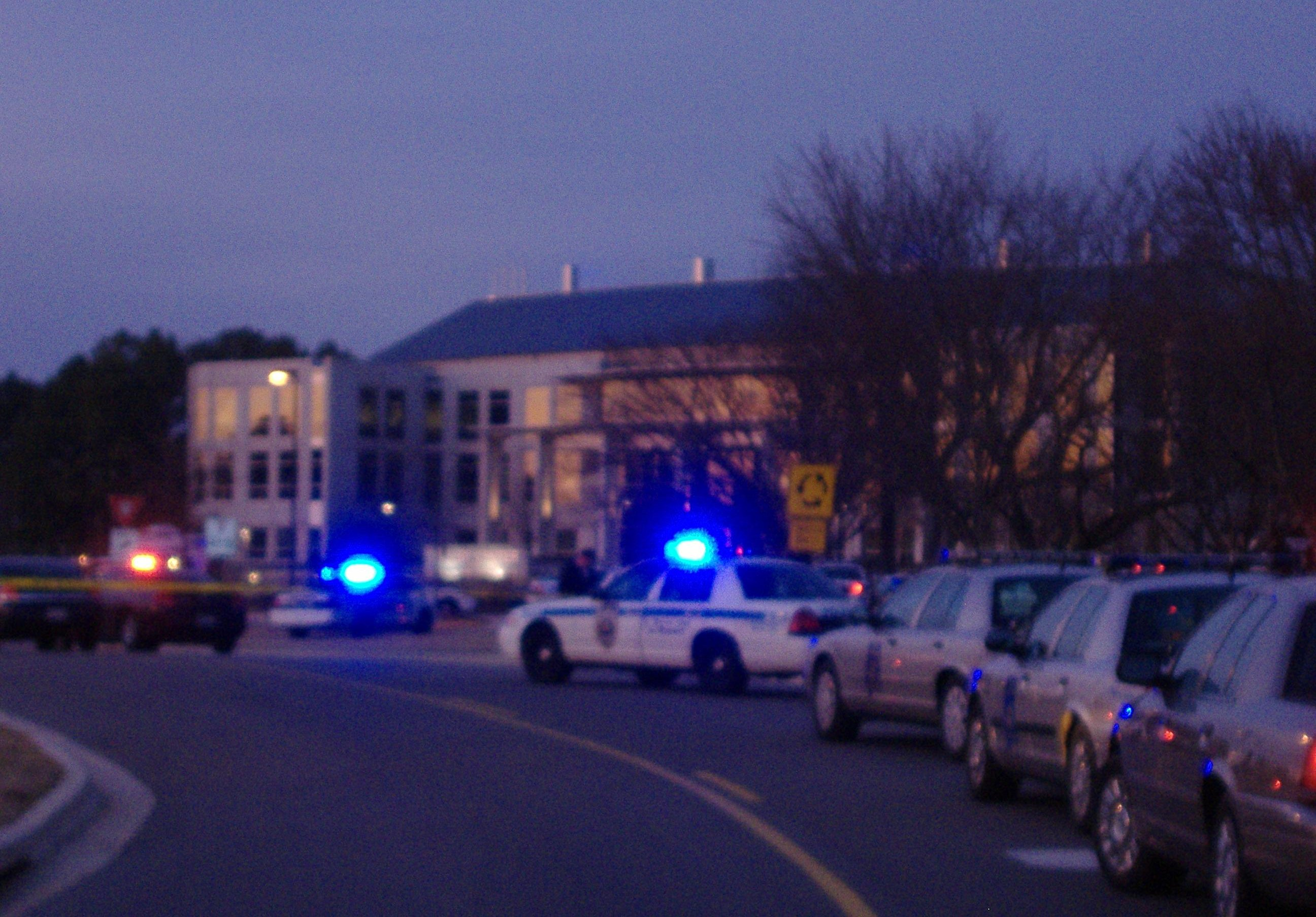
- Police response at the Shelby Center for Science and Technology
- Location: 34°43′34″N 86°38′29″W; Huntsville, Alabama, U.S.
- Date: February 12, 2010; 16 years ago c. 4:00 p.m. (CST; UTC−06:00)
- Attack type: Mass shooting; triple murder; school shooting
- Weapon: 9mm Ruger P95 semi-automatic pistol
- Deaths: 3
- Injuries: 3
- Perpetrator: Amy Bishop
- Convictions: Capital murder (1 count); Attempted murder (3 counts)
- Sentence: Life in prison

On February 12, 2010, a biology professor, 44-year-old Amy Bishop, fatally shot three people and wounded three more, during a routine meeting of the biology department attended by approximately twelve people at the University of Alabama in Huntsville (UAH) in Huntsville, Alabama, United States.

Bishop was charged with one count of capital murder and three counts of attempted murder. On September 11, 2012, she pleaded guilty to the charges after family members of victims petitioned the judge against use of the death penalty. The jury heard a condensed version of the evidence on September 24, as required by Alabama law. The same day, Bishop was sentenced to life in prison without the possibility of parole.

In March 2009, Bishop had been denied tenure at UAH, making spring 2010 her last semester there, per university policy. Due to the attention she attracted as a result of the shooting, previous violent incidents in which Bishop had been involved or implicated were reevaluated. In 1986, Bishop had shot and killed her brother Seth in Braintree, Massachusetts, in an incident that was, at the time, officially ruled an accident. She was also questioned, along with her husband Jimmy Anderson, after a 1993 pipe bomb incident was directed at her lab supervisor.

== Shooting ==
On the day of the shooting, Bishop taught her anatomy and neurosciences class at the University of Alabama in Huntsville (UAH). A student later said Bishop "seemed perfectly normal" during the lecture. Bishop then attended a biology department faculty meeting on the third floor of the Shelby Center for Science and Technology. According to witnesses, 12 or 13 people attended the meeting, which was described as "an ordinary faculty meeting". Bishop's behavior was also described as "normal" just before the shooting.

Bishop sat quietly at the meeting for 30 to 40 minutes before pulling out a Ruger P95 9mm handgun just before 4:00 p.m. A witness said that she "got up suddenly, took out a gun and started shooting at each one of us. She started with the one closest to her, and went down the row shooting her targets in the head." Another survivor said, "This wasn't random shooting around the room; this was execution style." Those who were shot were on one side of the oval table; the five on the other side dropped to the floor.

After Bishop had fired several rounds, Debra Moriarity, a biochemistry professor, said that she pointed the gun at her and pulled the trigger, but heard only a "click", as her gun "either jammed or ran out of ammunition". She described Bishop as initially appearing "angry", then "perplexed". Joseph Ng, an associate professor, said Moriarity attempted to stop Bishop by approaching her and asking her to stop, and helped the other survivors push Bishop from the room and block the door. Ng said, "Moriarity was probably the one that saved our lives. She was the one that initiated the rush."

=== Investigation ===
The suspected murder weapon was found in a bathroom on the second floor of the science building. Bishop did not have a permit to carry a concealed weapon. She was arrested a few minutes later outside the building. Shortly after her arrest, Bishop was quoted as saying, "It didn't happen. There's no way." When asked about the deaths of her colleagues, Bishop replied, "There's no way. They're still alive."

Police interviewed Bishop's husband, Jimmy Anderson, after it was determined that she had called him to pick her up after the shooting; they did not charge him. The couple were seen leaving their home with duffel bags on Friday afternoon before the shooting. Anderson said that Bishop had borrowed the gun used in the shooting and that he had escorted her to an indoor shooting range in the weeks before the incident.

Shortly after Bishop's arrest, there was concern that she had "booby trapped the science building with a 'herpes bomb'" intended to spread the virus. She had worked with the herpes virus during her postdoctoral studies, and had written a novel describing the spread of a virus similar to herpes throughout the world. The police had already searched the premises, finding only the murder weapon.

== Victims ==
Three faculty members were killed and three others injured. Only a few students were in the building at the time of the shooting, and none were harmed. A memorial service was held at UAH on February 19, 2010, with 3,000 people in attendance.

== Perpetrator ==
Amy Bishop (born April 24, 1965; age 44 at the time of the shooting) grew up in Braintree, Massachusetts, attended Braintree High School, and completed her undergraduate degree at Northeastern University in Boston, where her father, Samuel Bishop, was a professor in the art department. In 1989 she married James (Jim) Anderson and they have four children.

Bishop earned her Ph.D. in genetics from Harvard University in 1993, for the dissertation "The role of methoxatin (PQQ) in the respiratory burst of phagocytes". Her research interests included induction of adaptive resistance to nitric oxide in the central nervous system and utilization of motor neurons for the development of neural circuits grown on biological computer chips.

=== University of Alabama in Huntsville ===
Bishop joined the faculty of UAH's Department of Biological Sciences as an assistant professor in 2003; she was teaching five courses before the shooting. Previously, she was an instructor at Harvard Medical School. She and her husband's "portable cell incubator" came in third in a technology competition, winning $25,000. Prodigy Biosystems, where Anderson is employed, raised $1.25 million to develop the automated cell incubator. UAH president David Williams considered that the incubator would "change the way biological and medical research is conducted", but some scientists consulted by the press declared it unnecessary and too expensive.

Bishop, a second cousin of the novelist John Irving, had written three unpublished novels. One featured a woman scientist working to defeat a pandemic virus, and struggling with suicidal thoughts at the prospect of not earning tenure. According to The New Yorker profile, the novels "reveal a deep preoccupation with the concept of deliverance from sin". Bishop was a member of the Hamilton Writer's Group while living in Ipswich, Massachusetts, in the late 1990s and was said to believe that writing would be "her ticket out of academia". Members said she "would frequently cite her Harvard degree and family ties to Irving to boost her credential as a serious writer". Another member described her as smart but abrasive in her interactions and as feeling "entitled to praise". Bishop had a literary agent but had not published any books.

Several colleagues had expressed concern over Bishop's behavior. They described her as a "strange" and "crazy" person who interrupted meetings with "left-field kind of stuff". One of these colleagues was a member of Bishop's tenure review committee. After her tenure was denied and she learned that this colleague had called her "crazy", Bishop filed a complaint with the Equal Employment Opportunity Commission (EEOC), alleging sex discrimination, citing the professor's remark as possible evidence.

The professor was given the opportunity to back off the claim, or to say it was a flippant remark. But he didn't. "I said she was crazy multiple times and I stand by that", the professor said. "This woman has a pattern of erratic behavior. She did things that weren't normal ... she was out of touch with reality."

Bishop was reportedly a poor instructor and unpopular among her students. She dismissed several graduate students from her lab, and others sought transfers out. In 2009, several UAH students said they complained to administrators about Bishop on at least three occasions, saying she was "ineffective in the classroom and had odd, unsettling ways". A petition signed by "dozens of students" was sent to the department head. The complaints did not result in any classroom changes. Also in 2009, Bishop published an article in International Journal of General Medicine, "widely regarded as a vanity press", listing her husband and three eldest children as co-authors. The article was later removed from the journal website.

=== Tenure denial and appeal ===
As explained by the university president Williams, because Bishop had been denied tenure in March 2009, she could not expect to have her teaching contract renewed after March 2010. She appealed the decision to UAH's administration. Without reviewing the content of the tenure application, the administration determined that the process was carried out according to policy, and they denied her appeal. The routine faculty meeting at which Bishop opened fire was unrelated to her tenure.

Bishop's husband said the denial of tenure had been "an issue" in recent months, and described the tenure process as "a long, basically hard fight". He said that it was his understanding that Bishop "exceeded the qualifications for tenure," and that she was distressed at the likelihood of losing her position, barring a successful appeal. Bishop approached members of the University of Alabama System's board of trustees and hired a lawyer who was "finding one problem after another with the process". One point of dispute was whether two of her papers had been published in time to count toward tenure. Bishop, who gave more weight to obtaining patents than publishing papers, reportedly received several warnings that she needed to have more publications to receive tenure.

=== Previous incidents ===
==== Brother's shooting ====
Undated photo of Seth Bishop

On December 9, 1986, Bishop, then 21 years old, murdered her 18-year-old brother Seth at their home in Braintree, Massachusetts. She fired two shots from a 12-gauge pump-action shotgun (one into her bedroom wall upstairs and one into Seth's chest in the kitchen). Later, she pointed the gun at a moving vehicle on the adjacent road and tried to get into the vehicle.

Bishop and her mother told police the shooting had been an accident. Police found a live round in the gun's chamber, meaning that Bishop must have racked its slide after shooting her brother. After a brief inquiry into the incident by the Massachusetts State Police in 1986 (reported in 1987), they repeated the Braintree police department's initial assessment that the shooting was accidental. Then-Norfolk County District Attorney Bill Delahunt, later elected to the United States House of Representatives, did not file charges. Detailed records of the shooting had disappeared by 1988. Braintree police chief Paul Frazier said on February 13, 2010, "The report's gone, removed from the files."

After speaking with officers involved with the case in 1986, Frazier called the "accident" description inaccurate. He and others said that then-chief John Polio had ordered Bishop released to her mother Judy, who was allegedly a political supporter of the chief as a member of the Braintree town meeting. They said that Bishop had demanded to meet with Polio personally after the arrest instead of being charged for the shooting. Frazier was not on duty during the incident but recalled "how frustrated the members of the department were over the release" of Bishop.

Other officers, Frazier said, believed that Polio had "fix[ed] a murder", resulting in "a miscarriage of justice. Just because it was a friend of his." The retired Polio denied that there had been a cover-up. Frazier's 2010 account and the 1987 Massachusetts State Police report differ in several key details, including saying that Bishop had been arguing with her brother before the shooting when the rest of the family testified it was her father.

On February 16, 2010, Braintree officials announced that the files previously missing had been found. Then-Norfolk County District Attorney Bill Keating – himself elected to the House of Representatives later that year to replace Delahunt – concluded that probable cause existed in 1986 to arrest and charge Bishop for crimes committed after she fled the house. She had taken the shotgun to a nearby auto dealership shop and brandished it at two employees in an attempt to get a car. Bishop could have been charged with assault with a dangerous weapon, carrying a dangerous weapon, and unlawful possession of ammunition. The statute of limitations had expired on these charges.

The most serious charge considered in 1986 was manslaughter. Governor of Massachusetts Deval Patrick ordered the state police to review their investigation, saying, "It is critical that we provide as clear an understanding as possible about all aspects of this case and its investigation to ensure that where mistakes were made they are not repeated in the future." An investigation was opened in which the state cooperated with the Norfolk County District Attorney's office to assess the handling of the case by the state, the local police, and the then-district attorney.

On February 25, 2010, Keating sent District Court Judge Mark Coven a letter to start a judicial inquest into the 1986 shooting. Keating said that recently enlarged crime scene photos from Bishop's bedroom reveal a news article in which a similar crime was reported. He speculated that this article may relate to Bishop's intent. Keating did not identify the specific news article, but The Boston Globe wrote that an Internet search revealed that "two weeks earlier, the parents of Patrick Duffy, the actor who played Bobby Ewing on the popular television show Dallas, were killed in Montana by an assailant wielding a 12-gauge shotgun, who then held up a car dealership, stole a pickup truck, and fled".

On March 1, 2010, Detective Brian Howe, the state police's lead investigator in the 1986 shooting, said he looked forward to addressing the judicial inquest and stood by his 1987 report. He had agreed with Captain Theodore Buker, the late Braintree lead investigator, that the shooting was accidental. Howe said he was assigned to the case nearly two hours after the shooting and immediately called Braintree police. Buker told him that he would not be needed that day and that Bishop had already been released into her parents' custody. Howe said that Braintree police never informed him that she had later accosted employees at a car dealership at gunpoint, demanding a car. He said that he repeatedly requested the December 6 incident reports from the Braintree police, but never received them.

On March 1, 2010, Keating announced that an inquest would be held on April 13–16, 2010 by Judge Coven, first justice of Quincy District Court. During the inquest, Braintree police officers testified that Judy Bishop had asked for Polio by name before the officers were ordered to release Amy Bishop. Judy, Polio, and his wife all testified that Judy and Polio had not been friends, and Judy denied that she had asked for Polio at the station.

On June 16, 2010, Amy Bishop was charged with first degree murder in her brother's death, nearly 24 years after his shooting. Keating commented, "I can't give you any explanations, I can't give you excuses, because there are none. Jobs weren't done, responsibilities weren't met and justice wasn't served." Bishop's parents, who claim that the officers lied about the events at the station, issued a statement: "We cannot explain or even understand what happened in Alabama. However, we know that what happened 23 years ago to our son, Seth, was an accident."

The protagonist of the first of Bishop's unpublished novels is a woman who, as a child, attempted to frighten a friend after an argument but accidentally killed the friend's brother. Patrick Radden Keefe speculated, after reviewing the evidence, that Bishop had meant to frighten or shoot her father with the shotgun after an argument and mistook her brother for him. "I came to believe that there had indeed been a coverup" between Bishop's parents and Polio, he wrote, "but that it had been an act not of conspiracy but of compassion […] a parochial gesture of mercy and denial that had an incalculable cost, decades later, in Alabama."

==== Pipe-bomb incident ====
In 1993, Bishop and her husband were suspected of sending two pipe bombs to Paul Rosenberg, a Harvard Medical School professor; he managed to defuse the trigger mechanism. Rosenberg was Bishop's supervisor at a Children's Hospital neurobiology lab and had given a negative evaluation of Bishop, who resigned from her position. Bishop was afterward said to be "on the verge of a nervous breakdown", and her husband reportedly said that she wanted to "shoot", "stab", or "strangle" Rosenberg.

The investigation was closed with no charges filed. After the Huntsville shootings the case was reviewed, but remains unsolved.

==== International House of Pancakes assault ====
On March 16, 2002, Bishop started a fight with another customer at an IHOP restaurant in Peabody, Massachusetts. The other woman had taken the last available booster seat at the restaurant, leading Bishop to confront her, claiming her family had been there first; when the woman refused to give up the seat, Bishop punched her in the head while yelling, "I am Dr. Amy Bishop!" Bishop pleaded guilty to assault and received probation; prosecutors recommended that she attend anger management classes, but her husband said she never went.

== Charges ==
After the Huntsville shooting, Bishop was charged with one count of capital murder and three counts of attempted murder. The police confiscated her computer, her family's minivan, and a large binder containing documents pertaining to her "tenure battle". She secured an unnamed attorney and was held at Madison County jail without bail. Her court-appointed attorney was Roy W. Miller. Prosecutors said from the outset that they would seek the death penalty. According to state law, Bishop was eligible for either the death penalty or life in prison.

On February 15, during a closed-door hearing presided over by an Alabama judge, the charges were read to Bishop. After the hearing, Bishop was on suicide watch, a standard procedure in such cases. Her husband said she called him before her arraignment and they spoke for approximately two minutes. He said, "She seems to be doing OK." On March 12, while executing a search warrant on Bishop's residence, the police discovered a "suspicious device" prompting an evacuation of the nearby neighborhood; it was later identified by the bomb squad as non-explosive.

Miller visited Bishop in jail and said Bishop did not remember the shooting and was "very cogent" but seemed to recognize that "she has a loose grip on reality". Initially, he said Bishop had severe mental health issues that appear to be paranoid schizophrenia, but later retracted that statement, saying "he had spoken out of turn". In February 2013, Bishop told Keefe that she was being treated for paranoid schizophrenia with haloperidol. Miller told a reporter for The New York Times, "This is not a whodunit. This lady has committed this offense or offenses in front of the world. It gets to be a question in my mind of her mental capacity at the time, or her mental state at the time that these acts were committed." Miller said he would enlist the help of one or more psychiatrists to examine his client, who said this was not the first time she had no recollection of something that had happened. He said he did not know if Bishop was insane; determining whether she was culpable for her actions would be left to a psychiatrist. He did say that she was "very sorry for what she's done."

On June 18, two days after Bishop was indicted for the murder of her brother in a reopened case, she attempted suicide in Huntsville jail. She survived and was treated at a hospital and then returned to jail; her husband complained that authorities did not inform him of the incident.

In November 2010, survivors Leahy and Monticciolo filed lawsuits against Bishop and Anderson to recover damages. In January 2011, attorneys representing Davis's and Johnson's families filed wrongful death lawsuits against Bishop, Anderson, and UAH. In September 2011, Bishop pleaded not guilty by means of the insanity defense.

The district attorney did not pursue the death penalty as some of the victims' families expressed opposition.

=== Sentencing and appeal ===
On September 24, 2012, Bishop was sentenced to life in prison without the possibility of parole. Norfolk County declined to seek her extradition. Through her Massachusetts lawyer, Bishop said she wanted to be tried for her brother's death in order to vindicate herself. She is serving her sentence at the Julia Tutwiler Prison for Women in Wetumpka, Alabama. As of 2020 her security classification is medium and her residence is a dormitory instead of a cell block.

After pleading guilty in September 2012 and waiving her right to appeal, Bishop filed an appeal on February 11, 2013. The appeal stated that she was not informed of the rights she would be waiving by pleading guilty, that she was not correctly informed of the minimum range of punishment, and that the circuit court failed to explain that she could withdraw her plea. On April 26, 2013, the Court of Criminal Appeals of Alabama rejected the appeal, holding that Bishop failed to challenge the validity of her guilty pleas in the circuit court and did not file either a motion to withdraw her pleas or a motion for a new trial.

== Media ==
=== Television ===
- Vengeance Killer Coworkers S01E04 "Deadly Ambition"
- Snapped S10E04 "Amy Bishop"
- Fatal Encounters S03E04 "Deadly Genius"
- Deadly Women S11E12 "Tipping Point"

=== Podcast ===
- The Creep-Off, E181 "It's a Dog Eat Ass World Out There"
- Killer Psyche, "Amy Bishop: The Professor Turned Killer"
- Women & Crime, Episode #92, "Amy Bishop"

== See also ==
- List of school shootings in the United States by death toll
