= Pond Meadow Park =

Park in Massachusetts

Coordinates: 42.2048°N 70.9826°W

Pond Meadow Park is a 320 acres (130 ha) multi use park located between the towns of Braintree and Weymouth in Massachusetts. It has a 20 acres (8.1 ha) pond and dam that provide floodplain protection to the nearby Weymouth Landing Area. The park also acts as a recreation and conservation area, with a picnic area, dock for fishing, and Summer Nature Program. Encircling the pond is a two-mile long paved main trail for walking and biking, with paths to other color-coded unpaved trails marked along the main trail. There are 2 parking lots that also serve as entrances, one in Braintree and one in Weymouth. It was officially opened in 1976 and is run under the Weymouth Braintree Regional Recreation Conservation District.
