= Sunset Lake (Braintree, Massachusetts) =

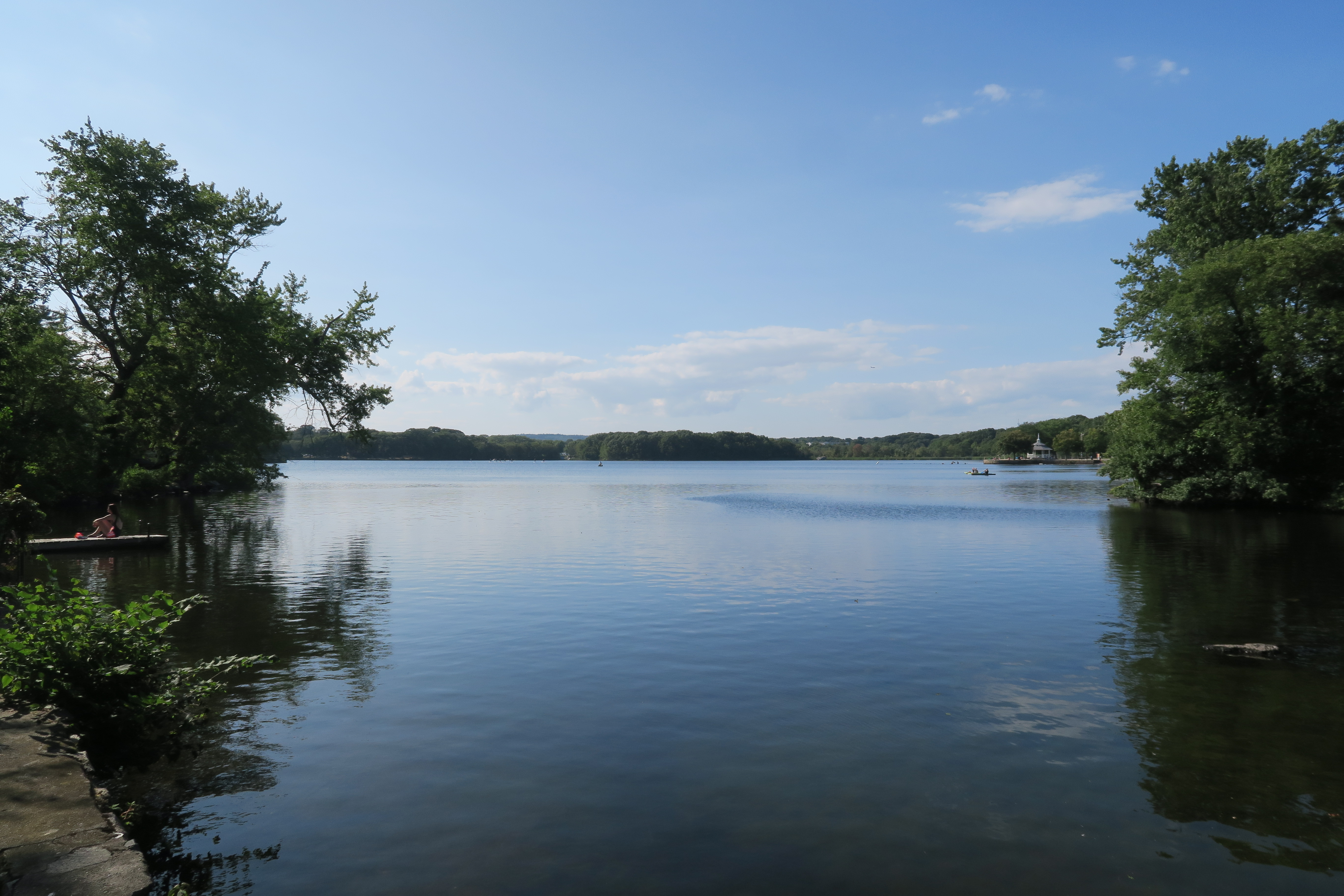
- Sunset Lake

- Location within Massachusetts Location within the United States
- Location: Franklin Street, Braintree, Massachusetts, United States
- Coordinates: 42°12′09″N 71°00′44″W
- Type: lake
- River sources: Farm River
- Basin countries: United States
- Surface elevation: 102 ft (31 m)
- Frozen: Late December–Early March (approx.)
- Settlements: Braintree

Sunset Lake is water body located in Norfolk County in Eastern Massachusetts, United States, in the south side of the town of Braintree.

== Location ==
Sunset Lake is located on Stafford Street, off of Franklin Street. The lake is owned by the Town of Braintree. The Sunset Lake dam is connected to the Farm River through the Sunset Lake "canal' that passes underneath Pond Street.

Braintree High School is located on the northwest side of the lake. On the south side of the lake, at 20 Pond Street, sit lakeside apartments, named the Sunset Lake Apartments.
