= Stanzi Potenza =

American TikToker, actor, and comedian (born 1995)

- Born: October 17, 1995 (age 31)
- Education: University of Massachusetts Boston (BA)
- Occupations: TikToker; actress; comedian; podcaster; YouTuber
- Years active: 2019–present
- Style: Dark comedy; sketch comedy; observational comedy; cringe comedy

TikTok information
- Page: Stanzi
- Followers: 4.3 million

YouTube information
- Channel: Stanzi
- Subscribers: 2.7 million
- Views: 1.6 billion

Stanzi Julianna Potenza (born October 17, 1995) is an American TikToker, actress, comedian, podcaster and YouTuber based in Boston. She is known for her comedy sketch series, including Civil War Love Saga and Heaven & Hell, produced for TikTok and YouTube, as well as co-hosting the podcast What Fresh Hell is This?.

== Early life and education ==
Potenza grew up in Massachusetts, moving around before settling in the town of Braintree, south of Boston. She is of Italian descent. Her parents divorced when she was five, after which her mother decided to pursue acting. At one audition, Potenza's mother brought her and two of her sisters to the theater due to a babysitter falling through; the theater subsequently became their "second home", and Potenza and her sisters became involved in acting from a young age. Her early acting roles included Maureen in a 2014 production of Rent for the Company Theatre in Norwell, a performance in Bat Boy: The Musical, and appearing as an uncredited extra in the 2016 film The Finest Hours.

Potenza attended the University of Massachusetts Boston and studied theatre. While there, she was awarded the Irene Ryan Acting Scholarship at the Kennedy Center American College Theater Festival in 2017. She graduated in 2018, receiving the school's John J. Conlon Prize in Theatre Arts and singing the National Anthem at the graduate commencement ceremony.

== Career ==
=== TikTok ===
Potenza joined TikTok in 2019. She had completed a six-week acting course at William Esper Studio in New York City in late 2019, and had planned to move back to Massachusetts to pursue acting, but was unable to do so due to the theater industry shutting down during the COVID-19 pandemic. Stuck at home, she began posting to TikTok as a creative outlet, as well as seeing it as a "testing ground" for the "final boss" of YouTube. Her first video went viral in January 2020, acquiring over one million views. In December, one of her videos, a 1980s-style infomercial encouraging young people to vote in the 2020–21 Georgia Senate election, was shared by candidate Jon Ossoff on his own TikTok account. By January 2021, she had acquired 565,000 followers, becoming a full-time content creator and joining the TikTok Creator Fund. In November 2022, she had five videos hit over a million views each.

Potenza's TikTok content consists primarily of various comedy sketch series, describing herself as a "sketch comedian from Hell". The first of these was Civil War Love Saga, depicting a lesbian love affair in the 1800s. Following this was Heaven and Hell, Potenza's most popular series, where she portrays God, Satan, and their respective assistants navigating problems in the afterlife, satirically addressing political figures, K-pop fandom, and other topics. Other skits have depicted a PSA on "mansplaining", the slam poetry-inspired "Tinder Bros", "Rich Moms Brunch", and a 911 operator mocking a subpar criminal. Sketches can take "anywhere between a few hours to a week" to create. The New York Times has placed Potenza within "CringeTok", a group of TikTok creators utilizing cringe comedy in their content.

Potenza has periodically made sponsored videos since 2020, a significant part of her income. In March 2023, she partnered with Lionsgate to promote the film John Wick: Chapter 4, creating a sketch in which she portrayed the title character's therapist.

In November 2022, talk show host Phil McGraw played one of Potenza's TikToks in a three-part special of his Dr. Phil show. The video features Potenza frantically discussing Netflix's Monster: The Jeffrey Dahmer Story in a parody of obsessive true crime fans, and McGraw, reportedly mistaking it as sincere, used the sketch as an example of true crime fandom going too far.

=== YouTube and other content ===
In February 2021, at the urging of fellow creator Hassan Khadair, Potenza began crossposting her TikTok videos to YouTube via the platform's YouTube Shorts service. After initially seeing minimal traffic on YouTube, she saw a sudden burst of views in December 2021, expanding from 5,000 subscribers to 500,000 in the span of two months. As of July 2024, she has over 2.45 million subscribers on YouTube.

Potenza has also dabbled in music, releasing covers of Radiohead's "Creep" and Kate Bush's "Running Up That Hill" as singles in 2022.

==== What Fresh Hell is This? ====
Since January 2022, Potenza has seen success with the podcast What Fresh Hell is This?, affiliated with the Pod People network, where she presents original sketches and humorous observations.

== Personal life ==
Potenza is bisexual. She previously identified as non-binary and used both she/her and they/them pronouns; however, in 2026, she clarified via Threads that she does not consider herself non-binary and now only uses she/her pronouns. She has expressed her hope that fans of her content "feel like it's okay to be unapologetically yourself. Sometimes people comment on my videos and say, 'I wish I could say this,' or, 'This is what I wish I could be.' Be that person! Live your life for yourself. I wouldn't be where I am now if I was thinking about what everyone else thought of me."

Potenza has ADHD, having been diagnosed in August 2022. She later discussed the diagnosis on an episode of her podcast. Additionally, Potenza suffers from right temporal lobe epilepsy and experiences tonic–clonic seizures. She also suffers from insomnia.

She has been "slightly obsessed" with sharks since childhood and was once featured by the Discovery Channel's Shark Week as a "Shark Week super fan".
