= William Esper Studio =

Acting school in Manhattan, New York

Coordinates: 40.75327°N 73.99049°W

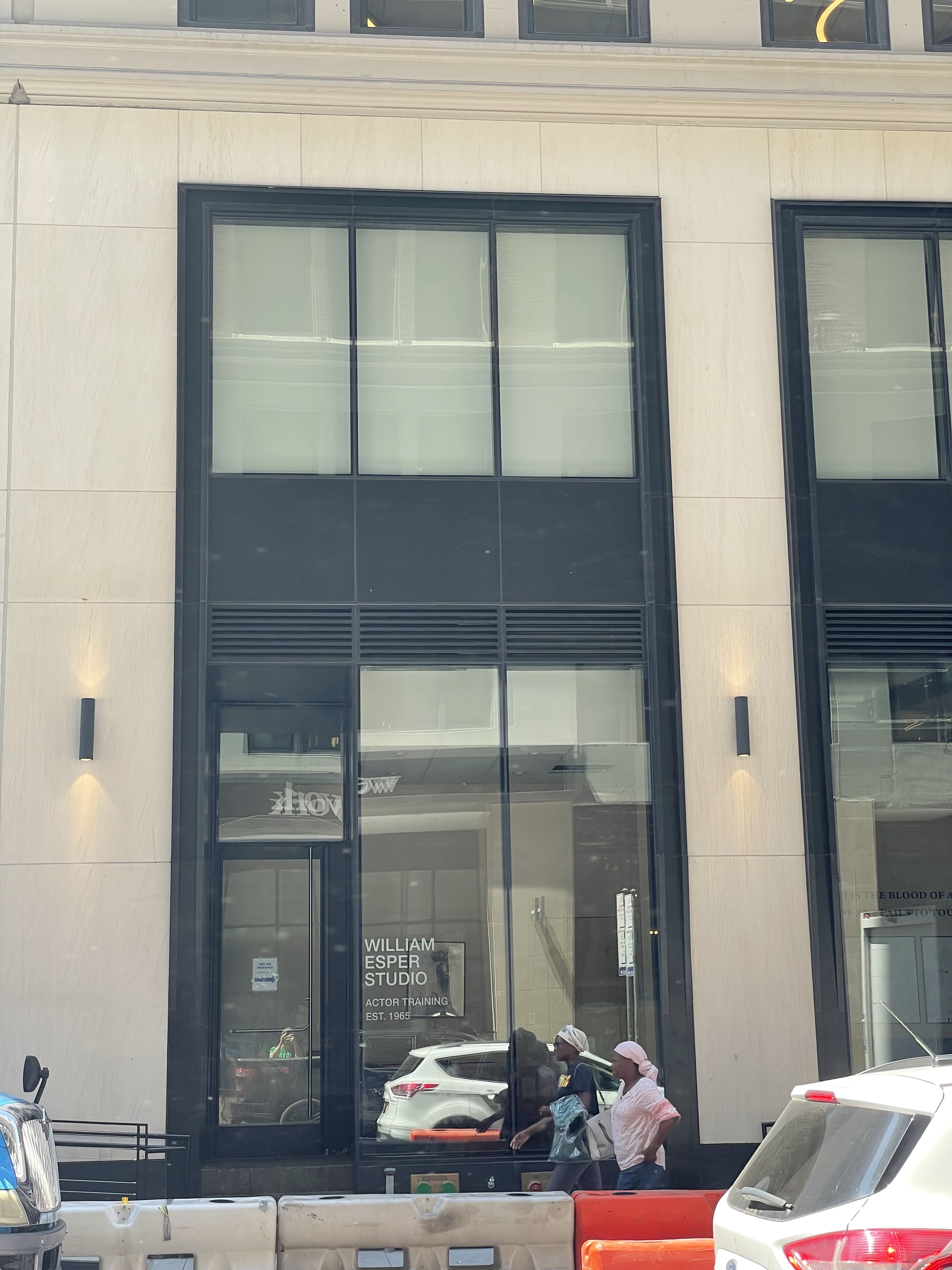

Information
- Established: 1965; 61 years ago
- Founder: William Esper

The William Esper Studio, founded in 1965, is a conservatory for the performing arts in Manhattan, New York City. The school is dedicated to the acting technique of Sanford Meisner. Its founder, William "Bill" Esper, is occasionally referred to as the best-known of Meisner's first generation teachers.

The William Esper Studio is a private, for-profit conservatory that offers two-year programs.

== Background ==
When Esper was a young man, he saw Eli Wallach and Maureen Stapleton in a touring production of The Rose Tattoo.

As Esper later recounted: "[I] was so struck by the acting ...[A]fter the play was over, I decided to go around the corner to get a cup of coffee so I could think about it some more. I walked into a little drugstore, and Eli was sitting there having a bite to eat..."

Esper talked to the actor, and Wallach told him he had studied at Sanford Meisner's Neighborhood Playhouse School of the Theatre. After graduating Case Western Reserve University in his native Ohio, Esper moved to New York City and began studying with Meisner, who was famous for his repetition exercise.

In 1962 Esper undertook training as a teacher and director with Meisner and proceeded to work closely with him for the next 15 years. Esper was on the staff of the Neighborhood Playhouse from 1965 to 1977 and Associate Director of the Playhouse Acting Department from 1974 to 1977.

In 1977 Esper also founded the BFA and MFA Professional Actor Training Programs at Rutgers University's Mason Gross School of the Arts. He led that department until 2004.

Esper has been a guest artist/teacher at Canada's Banff Festival of the Arts as well as at the National Theatre School of Canada, the St. Nicholas Theater in Chicago, Illinois, and the Schauspiel München School in Munich. Together with his wife Suzanne Esper, who also teaches at Esper Studios, he has conducted numerous workshops throughout Europe, most notably at the National Film School of Denmark, the Norwegian National Academy of Theatre, and the National Theatre Mannheim. In 2008 Bill and Suzanne Esper introduced Meisner's work to Russia at the St. Petersburg State Academy of Theater.

Esper has worked extensively Off-Broadway and regionally. He is a member of Ensemble Studio Theatre in New York. He was profiled in the book The New Generation of Acting Teachers, published by Viking Press in 1987. He is a past member of the National Board of the National Association of Schools of Theatre and a former Vice-President and Board Member of the University/Resident Theatre Association. He has lectured on acting at People′s Light and Theatre Company and the Screen Actors Guild Conservatory, New York City; SAG honored him with a Certificate of Achievement for his service to the profession. In 2011 Esper received the Association for Theatre in Higher Education (ATHE)'s Lifetime Achievement in Academic Theatre Award. In 2013 he was inducted into the College of Fellows of the American Theatre.

Esper died January 26, 2019. The studio is currently led by his widow Suzanne, who also was trained by Sanford Meisner both as an actor and a teacher alongside Esper.

== Notable alumni ==
In 1965 Esper founded his eponymous studio. Among those he and his wife have coached and taught are:

- Mamoudou Athie
- Katherine Bailess
- Kim Basinger
- Kathy Bates
- Jennifer Beals
- Robert Alan Beuth
- Leslie Bibb
- Sofia Black-D'Elia
- Larry David
- Kristin Davis
- Kim Delaney
- Aaron Eckhart
- Michael Esper
- Calista Flockhart
- Peter Gallagher
- Jeff Goldblum
- Steven Adly Guirgis
- Laura Harrier
- Maryam Hassouni
- Patricia Heaton
- Dulé Hill
- William Hurt
- Christine Lahti
- John Malkovich
- Wendie Malick
- Marc Menchaca
- Michael Lombardi
- Gretchen Mol
- David Morse
- Ebon Moss-Bachrach
- Timothy Olyphant
- Tonya Pinkins
- Maria Pitillo
- Stanzi Potenza
- Sam Rockwell
- Tracee Ellis Ross
- Richard Schiff
- Dar Salim
- Amy Schumer
- Paul Sorvino
- Mary Steenburgen
- Deborah Van Valkenburgh
- Katheryn Winnick
- Dean Winters
- Ramy Youssef

== Associated publications ==
- The Actor's Art & Craft, by William Esper and Damon DiMarco, featuring a preface by David Mamet (2008, ISBN 978-0307279262)
- The Actor's Guide to Creating a Character, by William Esper and Damon DiMarco (2014)
