= Bay State Conference =

High school athletic conference in Massachusetts, United States

- Conference: Massachusetts Interscholastic Athletic Association
- Division: MIAA Division I
- No. of teams: 10

The Bay State Conference (BSC) is an interscholastic high school athletic league located in Norfolk County and Middlesex County of Massachusetts. The Bay State Conference is named after the nickname of Massachusetts which is the Bay State. As of 2025—2026, the Bay State Conference consists of 10 member schools. All Bay State Conference member schools are public secondary schools and also members of the Massachusetts Interscholastic Athletic Association (MIAA) in District 7 (along with the Hockomock League and the Tri-Valley League in the same regions).

The Bay State Conference is known to be one of the most competitive conferences in the MIAA with some of the biggest high schools in the state of Massachusetts. In most sports members are in MIAA division 1 and/or division 2 for MIAA tournaments depending on the sport. The smallest member in the Bay State Conference is Milton High School at 1,070 students while the largest member is Framingham High School at 2,177 students.

Members in towns/cities that are located on Route 9 and/or I-90 are in the Carey division, while schools in towns/cities that are located on I-95, I-93, and/or Route 3 are in the Herget division. All members are within a 35 mile radius of each other with the furthest distance between schools being 34 miles with Framingham High School and Weymouth High School.

In 2017 Carey division member Dedham High School left the Bay State Conference and joined the Tri-Valley League as the league's 11th member. Norwood High School another Carey division member followed suit and became the Tri-Valley League's 12th member a year later in 2018. In 2019 after the departure of Dedham and Norwood, the divisions were realigned with Newton North High School moving from the Herget division to the Carey division.

The Wellesley (Carey division member) and Needham (Herget division member) high school football rivalry is the oldest public high school football rivalry in Massachusetts and third oldest high school football rivalry in the United States. Traditionally played on Thanksgiving morning, the Wellesley High School Raiders and Needham High School Rockets have meet each other 133 times as of 2021 with the first meeting dating back to Thanksgiving morning of 1882 at Morton Field in Wellesley (named West Needham at the time).

== Members ==
Bay State Conference
Locations of Bay State Conference members, 2023-2024 Carey division member and Herget division member

The 10 members of the Bay State conference consists of Brookline, Framingham, Natick, Newton North and Wellesley in the Carey Division, along with Braintree, Milton, Needham, Walpole and Weymouth in the Herget division. Depending on the sport Carey and Herget division members will play each other once or twice a year. For example, in Baseball Carey and Herget members play each other two games a year in inter-division play (for example Natick (a Carey division member) will play Brookline, Framingham, Newton North, and Wellesley (the rest of the Carey division members) two games a year one game at home and one game away). Also in baseball Carey and Herget members play each-other one game (home or away) a year in intra-division play (for example Natick (a Carey division member) will play Needham, Walpole, Braintree, Milton, and Weymouth (the Herget division members) once a year either at home or away). Finally in baseball the inter-division home and away game alternates each year so for example Natick (a Carey division member) will play at Braintree (a Herget division member) in even number years and then Natick will play Braintree at Natick in odd number years.

== Schools ==
| School | Location | Colors | Mascot | Year founded | Enrollment | Division |
|---|---|---|---|---|---|---|
| Braintree High School | Braintree, MA | Blue & White | Wamps | 1858 | 1,801 | Herget |
| Brookline High School | Brookline, MA | Red & Blue | Warriors | 1843 | 2,155 | Carey |
| Framingham High School | Framingham, MA | Navy Blue & White | Flyers | 1792 | 2,177 | Carey |
| Milton High School | Milton, MA | Red & White | Wildcats | 1909 | 1,070 | Herget |
| Natick High School | Natick, MA | Red, Blue, & White | Redhawks | 1954 | 1,732 | Carey |
| Needham High School | Needham, MA | Navy Blue & Gold | Rockets | 1898 | 1,718 | Herget |
| Newton North High School | Newton, MA | Orange & Black | Tigers | 1859 | 2,089 | Carey |
| Walpole High School | Walpole, MA | Blue & Orange | Timberwolves | 1870 | 1,172 | Herget |
| Wellesley High School | Wellesley, MA | Red & Black | Raiders | 1938 | 1,540 | Carey |
| Weymouth High School | Weymouth, MA | Maroon & Gold | Wildcats | 1854 | 1,900 | Herget |
