= Gen. Sylvanus Thayer House =

Historic house in Massachusetts, United States

- U.S. National Register of Historic Places
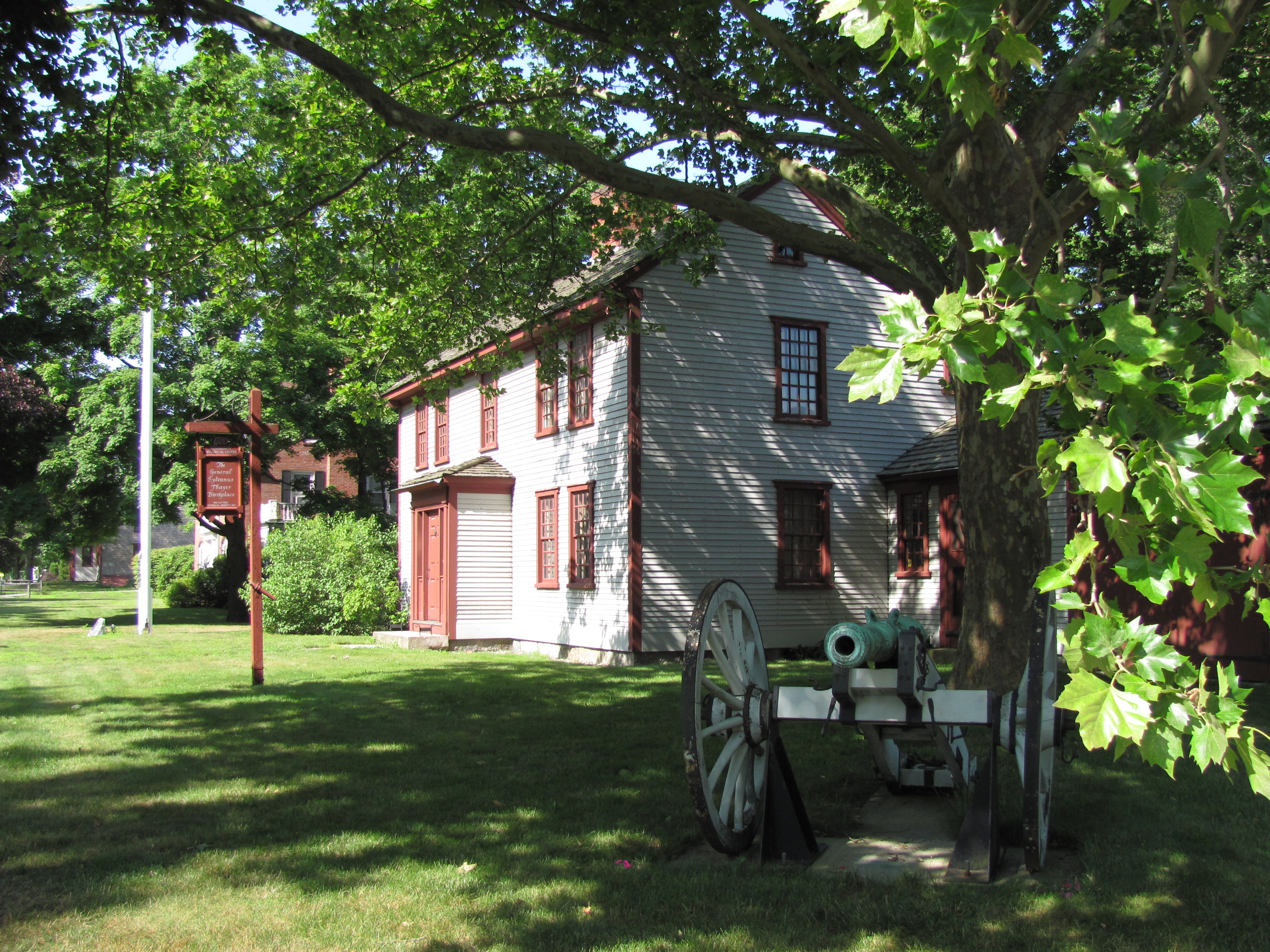

- Location within Massachusetts Location within the United States
- Location: 786 Washington Street, Braintree, Massachusetts
- Coordinates: 42°12′22″N 71°0′17″W
- Built: 1720
- Architectural style: New England Saltbox
- NRHP reference No.: 74000372
- Added to NRHP: December 3, 1974

The Gen. Sylvanus Thayer House, also known as the Sylvanus Thayer Birthplace, is an historic house at 786 Washington Street in Braintree, Massachusetts. It is operated by the Braintree Historical Society as the Thayer House Museum, which is open year-round.

The 2 1/2-story wood-frame house was built in 1720 by Nathaniel Thayer and was subsequently expanded in the 1760s and again in the 19th century. General Sylvanus Thayer, known as the "father of West Point," was born in the house in 1785 and resided there until 1793. In 1958, the parcel of land on which the house sat was purchased by the Walworth Steel Company; rather than tearing the old house down, it was dismantled and moved approximately one mile down Washington Street to its present location. Roughly 60% of the timbers in the house are original, while the others have been replaced during restoration with materials appropriate to the late 18th century. The house is furnished to represent a middle-class agricultural household, like the Thayer family, in 1785–1793.

The house was listed on the National Register of Historic Places in 1974. The Braintree Historical Society constructed a reproduction post-and-beam dairy barn to complement the Thayer House Museum in that same year. Both contain exhibit galleries and are open to the public.

A cannon that was a gift from the United States Military Academy at West Point, is on the front lawn of the House.

The cannon and carriage have been completely restored. Both wheels were reconstructed by a wheelwright and a blacksmith, one for the wood and one for the iron tires, working together in Colonial Williamsburg, using only tools and techniques consistent with the period. The wheels were reinstalled and the cannon was rededicated in a formal commemoration ceremony on the front lawn of the Thayer House with the Williamsburg craftsmen present, on June 21, 2015.

== See also ==
- National Register of Historic Places listings in Norfolk County, Massachusetts
