= Natick High School =

Coordinates: 42°16′28.91″N 71°21′42.36″W

- 15 West Street; Natick, Massachusetts 01760; United States

Information
- Type: Public high school Open enrollment
- Established: 1954
- School district: Natick Public Schools
- Principal: Josepha Blocker
- Teaching staff: 140.20 (FTE)
- Grades: 9-12
- Enrollment: 1,753 (2025-2026)
- Student to teacher ratio: 12.56
- Colors: Red; Blue; White
- Song: Natick
- Fight song: Here Comes Natick High
- Athletics conference: Bay State Conference
- Mascot: Rudy The Redhawk
- Team name: Redhawks
- Rivals: Framingham
- Newspaper: The Natick Nest
- Website: nhs.natickps.org

Natick High School is an urban/suburban public high school serving students in grades 9 to 12 in Natick, Massachusetts, United States. The school is located on the banks of Dug Pond. Its enrollment was 1,753 students during the 2025–2026 school year. The original building was built in 1953 at approximately 189,000 sq ft (17,600 m^{2}). and opened in 1954. The building was expanded in 1965 (additional 94,000 sq ft.). Additional renovations took place in 1985. In 2010, the town voted to replace the Natick High School building. The new facility was constructed on the fields immediately to the south of the former building. Demolition on the former building began on June 25, 2012. The new building design is based on a model approved by the state of Massachusetts. This was necessary in order to maximize state reimbursement for design and construction; it cost $78 million. The new high school opened to students on August 29, 2012.

== The arts at Natick High ==
- Natick High School Theater produces two full-length plays each year, usually presenting a full-scale musical in the fall semester and a more intimate straight play, revue or theatrical event in the spring. In the winter, students have the option of staging a completely student-run, student-acted, student-directed piece as well.
- The Natick High School Speech Team is a speech and debate team. The team has won the Massachusetts Forensic League State Championship and has had multiple state and national champions. Each year, the Natick High School Speech Team sends students to the National Catholic Forensic League Grand National Tournament and occasionally sends competitors to the National Speech and Debate Association's National Speech and Debate Tournament as well.
- The Natick High School Music Program provides students with a rich selection of vocal and instrumental ensembles including Concert Choir, West Street Singers (formally advanced concert choir, currently a competitive show choir), Chamber Singers (all-female advanced choir), Men's Choir (all-male choir), Musae (all-female choir), Concert Band, Jazz Ensemble, Pep Band, and Wind Ensemble, all of which offer an honors designation. Natick High School also has a student-led a cappella program consisting of two co-ed groups, Seven's Not Enough (est. 2006) and Scalestorm (est. 2016) and one treble group, Retrograde (est.2019). Each year, Natick High sends vocalists and instrumentalists to the Jr. District Festival, Sr. District Festival, and All-State Music Festival. Historically, Natick High's musical ensembles have had success at the Massachusetts Instrumental and Choral Conductors Association (MICCA) Competition, winning gold medals. Along with this, the Natick High Jazz Ensemble has had the opportunity to perform at the Hatch Memorial Shell on the Charles River Esplanade as a part of the Massachusetts Association for Jazz Education (MAJE) competitions.

Notable alumni of Natick High's theatre program, speech team, and music programs include William Finn, Alison Fraser, Jonathan Richman, and Marc Terenzi.

== Athletics ==
Natick Redhawks
- Nickname: Redhawks
- Division: I or II
- Conference: Bay State Conference
- Affiliation: Massachusetts Interscholastic Athletic Association
- Location: Natick, MA
- Football stadium: Memorial Field (also Lacrosse, Soccer and Track and Field)
- Basketball arena: Natick High School Gym (also Volleyball and Wrestling)
- Ice hockey arena: William L. Chase Arena
- Baseball stadium: Mahan Field
- Softball stadium: Natick High School Softball Fields
- Other Facilities: Sassamon Trace Golf Course (golf) , Natick High School Tennis Courts (Tennis) , Blue Hills Ski Area/Ragged Mountain (skiing) , Keefe Tech Pool/Longfellow Sports Club Natick (swimming and diving) , Gymnastics Express (gymnastics)
- Colors: Red, White, and Blue
- Mascot: Rudy the Redhawk
- Fight song: Here comes Natick High

Fall	Boys:	Cross Country	Cheer	Soccer	Sailing	Football	Golf	
Fall	Girls:	Cross Country	Cheer	Soccer	Sailing	Swim & Dive	Volleyball	Field Hockey
Winter	Boys:	Basketball	Ice Hockey	Indoor Track & Field	Swim & Dive	Wrestling	Cheer	Ski
Winter	Girls:	Basketball	Ice Hockey	Indoor Track & Field	Gymnastics	Cheer	Ski	
Spring	Boys:	Baseball	Lacrosse	Outdoor Track & Field	Tennis	Sailing	Ultimate (frisbee)	Volleyball
Spring	Girls:	Softball	Lacrosse	Outdoor Track & Field	Tennis	Sailing	Ultimate (frisbee)	

- Natick High School offers 18 sports for boys and 19 for girls.
- The school announced the formation of an esports team in 2019.
- Natick's Football team has made USA Today's Top 25 list a total of three times. In 1982 (No. 23). 1983 (No. 10), and 1984 (No. 13).

== The Sassamon & The Natick Nest ==
The Sassamon was the school newspaper that was published four times a year, in December, February, April, and June. It eventually became the annual yearbook. The Sassamon was named after John Sassamon, the Native American aid of John Eliot (missionary). Currently, Natick High's newspaper is The Natick Nest, named after the school's nickname, the Redhawk. The Natick Nest is published 6 times a year.

== Notable alumni ==
=== Athletics ===
- Joe Coleman, former MLB player (Washington Senators, Detroit Tigers, Chicago Cubs, Oakland Athletics, Toronto Blue Jays, Pittsburgh Pirates, San Francisco Giants).
- Rich Costello, retired American professional ice hockey player.
- Doug Flutie, played football, basketball, and baseball at the school, went on to play football at Boston College and won the Heisman Trophy in 1984. His career continued in the NFL and Canadian Football League before retiring after the 2005 season with the New England Patriots.
- Darren Flutie, CFL and NFL veteran who attended Natick High School before going to Boston College; second all-time in receptions in the CFL. CFL Hall of Famer.
- Anjali Forber-Pratt, wheelchair racer and Paralympian.
- Dottie Green, female catcher who played from 1943 through 1947 in the All-American Girls Professional Baseball League
- Walt Hriniak, Major League Baseball player (Atlanta Braves, San Diego Padres).
- Dan LaCouture, drafted into the NHL 1996; played for the Edmonton Oilers, Pittsburgh Penguins, New York Rangers, Boston Bruins, New Jersey Devils, Carolina Hurricanes.
- Eddie Mahan, American football player.
- Pete Smith (baseball, born 1940), former Boston Red Sox player.
- Frank Varrichione (born 1932), college All-American and five time Pro Bowl professional football player (Steelers, Rams).

=== Fine and performing arts ===
- Joanie Bartels, first female children's music artist to receive RIAA Gold Record Certification, awarded for her album Lullaby Magic.
- William Finn, Tony, lyricist and musical theater composer.
- Alison Fraser, stage actress and a two-time Tony Award nominee for her roles in The Secret Garden and Romance/Romance.
- Augustine Og Mandino (1923–1995), self-help inspirational author of 22 books. He was born in Framingham and a 1940 graduate of Natick High School where he was an editor of the high school newspaper, "The Sassamon."
- John O'Hurley, actor best known for role on Seinfeld.
- Jonathan Richman, singer-songwriter and former frontman of The Modern Lovers. He featured an instrumental track entitled "Maybe a Walk Home from Natick High School" on his solo album Her Mystery Not of High Heels and Eye Shadow.
- Jim Riley drummer and band leader for the country band Rascal Flatts.
- Marc Terenzi of the boy band Natural (band) is a graduate of Natick High School where he experienced early success in the music program.

=== Other ===
- Joseph M. Connolly, American police detective and politician.
- Paul Dellegatto, chief meteorologist for Fox13 WTVT in Tampa and a contributor to the Fox News Channel is a 1978 graduate of Natick High.
- Gerald Eustis Thomas, second African American to become a Rear Admiral in the US Navy. He went on to serve as ambassador to Guyana and Kenya, and Master of Davenport College.
- Susan Wornick, former American television journalist and current TV host and spokesperson.
