= Frank Varrichione =

American football player (1932–2018)

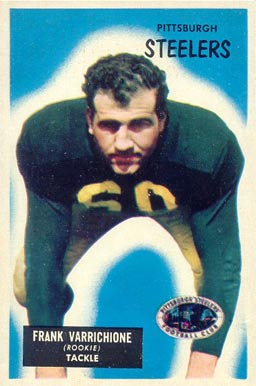
- The young and athletic Varrichione as a rookie in 1955, wearing Notre Dame green.

No. 74, 70
- Position: Offensive tackle

Personal information
- Born: January 14, 1932; Natick, Massachusetts, U.S.
- Died: January 6, 2018 (aged 85); Framingham, Massachusetts, U.S.
- Listed height: 6 ft 1 in (1.85 m)
- Listed weight: 255 lb (116 kg)

Career information
- High school: Natick; Aquinas Institute (Rochester, New York)
- College: Notre Dame (1951–1954)
- NFL draft: 1955: 1st round, 6th overall pick

Career history
- Pittsburgh Steelers (1955–1960); Los Angeles Rams (1961–1965)

Awards and highlights
- 5× Pro Bowl (1955, 1957-1958, 1960, 1962); Pittsburgh Steelers Legends team; First-team All-American (1954)

Career NFL statistics
- Games played: 133
- Games started: 128
- Fumble recoveries: 9
- Stats at Pro Football Reference

Frank Joseph Varrichione (pronounced "Vair-a-kee-oh'-nee;" January 14, 1932 – January 6, 2018) was an American professional football player who was a tackle for 11 seasons in the National Football League (NFL). He played college football for the Notre Dame Fighting, winning a national championship with a 9-0-1 record in 1953.

During his collegiate career Varrichione was named a third-team All-American in 1954, recognized as one of the top 33 players in the college game. He would be the first lineman selected in the 1955 NFL draft, the league's sixth pick overall. Varrichione's stint in the NFL would include six seasons playing for the Pittsburgh Steelers before a trade ahead of the 1961 season sent him to the Los Angeles Rams, for whom he would play for five more years. During his career Varrichione would make five NFL Pro Bowl appearances between 1955 and 1964, indicative of his status as a top echelon offensive lineman.

== Early life ==
Frank Varrichione was born January 14, 1932, at Natick, Massachusetts. His parents, Joseph and Mary Varrichione, were born in Italy and emigrated to the United States in 1913 — first arriving in Boston before moving slightly more than 20 miles inland to the town of Natick. He was the youngest of ten children in a Roman Catholic family.

Large and strong from his early boyhood years, Varrichione took up football as a 9th grade student at Natick High School. He graduated early and then was enrolled in a Catholic prep school, St. Thomas Aquinas in Rochester, New York, where he attracted the attention of recruiters for the University of Notre Dame in South Bend, Indiana.

== College career ==
Following graduation at St. Thomas Aquinas, Varrichione was enrolled on scholarship to Notre Dame. He was a 210-pound Freshman on the 1951 team, slated for immediate use on a depleted offensive line for what was expected to be one of the youngest varsity teams in school history. Varrichione was made a starter as a Freshman, the only such on the offensive side of the ball for the 1951 Fighting Irish Team.

Varrichione's initial campaign was marred by injury, however, when the young right guard went down in an October 27, 1951, game against the University of Pittsburgh. The injury was not season-ending, however, and by the November 8 game against the University of Oklahoma, Varrichione's number 60 jersey was again seen on the field.

During his Junior year Varrichione showed improvement on the defensive side of the ball, tutored by Notre Dame head coach Frank Leahy. Varrichione thrived in his defensive role, scoring two points on a safety in an October 1953 game against the Pitt Panthers. The play helped Varrichione earn national Lineman of the Week honors from the Associated Press.

He would also earn a place in Notre Dame lore as an offensive tackle in helping Notre Dame escape with a tie against the University of Iowa by spontaneously suffering a phantom injury which stopped the clock with no timeouts remaining and time winding down at the end of the first half, helping to enable a critical touchdown. His dramatic flop at a critical moment would help Varrichione earn the moniker "Faintin' Frank." He would also be the recipient of a deluge of flowers and get-well-soon cards from sarcastic Hawkeye football fans, perturbed by the outcome of Varricihone's timely ailment.

The tie against Iowa would prove to be the only blemish on a 9-0-1 record, and the 1953 Fighting Irish football team would go on to claim a share of the 1953 College Football Championship.

Varrichione's ability was recognized during his senior season when he was named a Third-team NFA All American for 1954.

== Professional career ==
=== Pittsburgh Steelers ===
As a four-year starter for the high-profile Notre Dame Fighting Irish, Varrichione was a highly sought-after player in the 1955 NFL draft. He was selected in the first round by the Pittsburgh Steelers, the league's sixth pick overall, and the first offensive lineman chosen. Informed of his selection by a Pittsburgh newspaper writer via telephone, Varrichione predicted no difficulty in coming to financial terms with the Steelers and indicated a desire to play professional football for "as long as I can last." Varrichione's prediction proved accurate and by the first days of February he was under contract with the Steelers to play the 1955 season. Varrichione's first pro deal paid him $8,000 for the year — a substantial sum for an offensive lineman in that day.

Varrichione was well suited to the professional game and he was named to the 1955 Pro-Bowl Game, held in January following his rookie season. He saw action as part of the East team that eked out a controversial 31–30 victory over their other conference rivals.

His eagerness to sign a first NFL contract had dissipated by 1957, and Varrichione remained unsigned as the Steelers assembled at St. Bonaventure University in Olean, New York, for the opening of training camp. No raise was forthcoming, however, and following a telephone conversation with team president Art Rooney, Varrichione signed on August 6 to play with the Steelers for another year, thereby completing the team's 45-man roster. Three days of practice were missed. Despite revelations that he battled partial deafness which forced him to wear a special helmet outfitted with a hearing aid, the season proved to be another good one for the 240-pound tackle and Varrichione was named to his second Pro Bowl at the end of the year.

Varrichione would repeat the feat in 1960 as one of five Pittsburgh Steelers named to the East squad. He was rewarded following the season with a new contract with the Steelers, this a three-year deal for an undisclosed amount — the longest contract of his career. The six-year veteran Pro Bowler seemed poised to finish his career in Steeler black and gold.

=== Los Angeles Rams ===
In April 1961, Varrichione's world was turned upside down when the Steelers with which he had just signed a three-year deal traded his contract to the Los Angeles Rams for that of defensive tackle-placekicker Lou Michaels, a 1958 first round pick who was just starting to come into his own as an NFL defensive star. The Steelers had hated to part company with a top offensive lineman like Varrichione, head coach Buddy Parker told the press at the time of the transaction, but the deal had to be done to provide vitally needed defensive strength and a much-needed kicker. The exchange was an even one, with no other considerations changing hands. It would be the Rams with whom Varrichione played the rest of his career.

Due to family considerations, Varrichione threatened retirement following the 1961 season. "My wife is expecting her fourth child, and this traveling around is awfully tough," he told the press. "She doesn't want me to play anymore." Despite initially telling Rams general manager Elroy "Crazylegs" Hirsch that he planned to quit, Varrichione eventually relented and by the start of training camp for the 1962 campaign, he was ready to don the blue and gold of the Rams again.

Together with his Rams teammate Joe Carollo, a fellow Notre Dame alum, Varrichione played every single offensive play of the 1963 NFL season — 14 games in all. By his 11th and final season the right tackle Varrichione was honored by his peers through his choice as offensive captain of the team.

Varrichione played in a total of 133 NFL games over the course of his 11-year career. He was never made wealthy by the NFL, his top contract with the Rams bringing him just $20,000 per year. Varrichione was named to five NFL Pro Bowl teams, making the squad in 1955, 1957, 1958, 1960 and 1962.

== Life after football ==
Varrichione was prepared in measure for life after football by the fact that he had never really made enough playing the game to live even in his prime. During his Steeler playing days he ran a drive-in restaurant in Natick, while he took to selling real estate during the off season in his Ram playing days.

Varrichone retired from football in 1965 and moved to Michigan, where he worked in sales for a trucking firm. After three years there, Varrichione returned to Natick to take over the family's paint contracting business there. He retired briefly in 1986 but came back two years later to run a coffee shop with his wife, finally retiring for good in 1992.

In 1995 Varrichione was named to the Boston section of the Italian-American Sports Hall of Fame.

Varrichione died on January 6, 2018, at the age of 85.

== See also ==
- 1954 College Football All-America Team
- 1955 Pittsburgh Steelers season
- 1956 Pittsburgh Steelers season
- 1957 Pittsburgh Steelers season
- 1958 Pittsburgh Steelers season
- 1959 Pittsburgh Steelers season
- 1960 Pittsburgh Steelers season
- 1961 Los Angeles Rams season
- 1962 Los Angeles Rams season
- 1963 Los Angeles Rams season
- 1964 Los Angeles Rams season
- 1965 Los Angeles Rams season
