= Braintree Public Schools =

Public school district in Massachusetts

Location
- Braintree, Massachusetts US-MA United States

District information
- Type: Public
- Motto: Achieving. Creative. Inclusive.
- Grades: Pre-K through 12
- Superintendent: Tim MacDonald
- Asst. superintendent(s): Nora Vernazza
- Schools: Elementary 6 Middle 2 High 1
- Budget: $113,517,385.50 total $20,829.08 per pupil in 2024
- NCES District ID: 2502940

Students and staff
- Students: 5,450 (2024)
- District mascot: Wamp
- Colors: Blue & White

Other information
- Schedule: 2026-2027 School Calendar
- Website: Braintree Public Schools

The Braintree Public School District, located in Braintree, Massachusetts, includes Hollis Elementary School, Donald Ross Elementary School, Archie T. Morrison Elementary School, Liberty Elementary School, Mary E. Flaherty Elementary School (formerly Lakeside Elementary School), Highlands Elementary School, East Middle School, South Middle School, and Braintree High School. Monatiquot Elementary School changed to Monatiquot School Kindergarten Center for full day kindergarten students but was discontinued in 2024.

== District information ==
There are nine public schools in the district: six elementary schools, two middle schools and one high school, with a total enrollment of just over 5,748 students for the 2007–08 school year. There is no kindergarten center. 89.8% of the system's students graduate. The School Department’s budget was $82,316,651 in FY2026. The superintendent is Mr. Tim MacDonald.

89% of Braintree High School graduates pursue post-secondary studies. Students at all grade levels typically score above state and national averages on all measures of standardized testing, including the MCAS and the SAT. Braintree High School offers eighteen advanced placement (AP) courses; more than a third of the senior class is enrolled in at least one AP course. The high school also receives wide recognition for its athletic program; BHS teams compete in the Bay State Conference. The schools enjoy strong support and involvement from parents, with active parent organizations at each school as well as numerous other opportunities for parents to participate in enhancing the educational program. The district has traditionally demonstrated a commitment to lifelong learning through the many and varied programs offered by the Braintree Continuing Education Program.

=== High School ===
- Braintree High School

=== Middle School ===
- South Middle School
- East Middle School

=== Elementary School ===
- Flaherty Elementary
- Highlands Elementary
- Hollis Elementary
- Morrison Elementary
- Liberty Elementary
- Ross Elementary
