= Weymouth High School =

Coordinates: 42.182186°N 70.943855°W

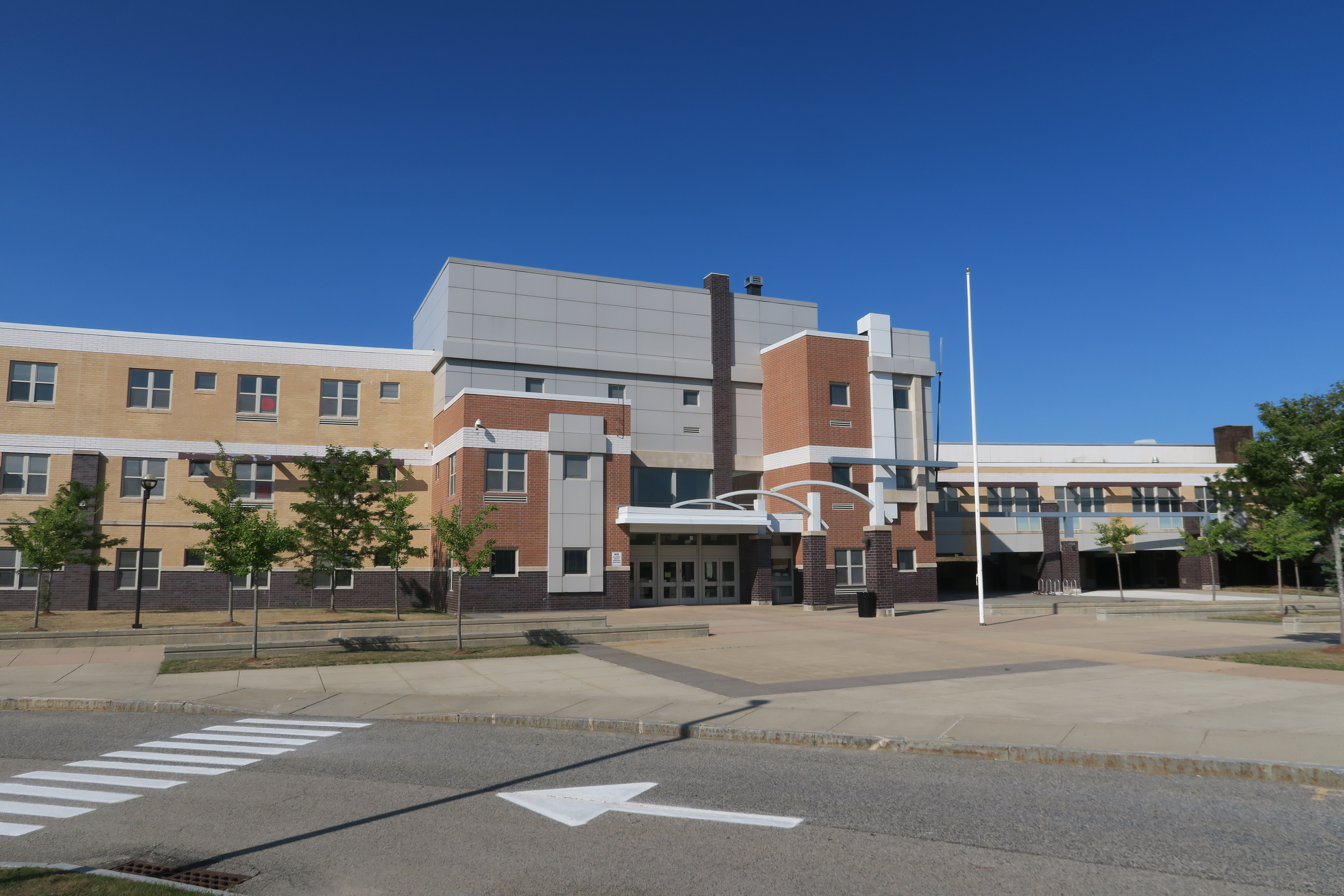
- Weymouth High School

Location
- One Wildcat Way; Weymouth, Norfolk County, Massachusetts 02190; United States

Information
- Type: High School
- Established: 1854
- School district: Weymouth Public Schools
- Principal: Karen Monahan
- Staff: 143.56 (FTE)
- Grades: 9–12
- Enrollment: 1,807 (2022–2023)
- Student to teacher ratio: 12.59
- Hours in school day: 6 hours, 45 minutes
- Houses: Maroon House, Gold House
- Fight song: Maroon and Gold
- Athletics conference: Bay State Conference
- Mascot: Wildcat
- Team name: The Wildcats
- Newspaper: The Wildcat Word
- Website: whs.weymouthschools.org

Weymouth High School (WHS) is a comprehensive public high school in Weymouth, Massachusetts, United States that serves students in grades nine through twelve. Weymouth High School also offers a Career and Technical Education Program offering such courses as Allied Health, Automotive Technology, Construction Technology, Cosmetology, Culinary Arts, Drafting and Design Technology, Early Childhood Education, Graphic Communications, Information Technology, and Metal Fabrication.

== History ==
Weymouth High School was first established in 1854. The building that used to house Weymouth High in the early 20th century stood next to the Town Hall on Middle Street. The building that currently houses Weymouth High School opened in 2004 at One Wildcat Way in South Weymouth. This building was the original Weymouth South High School and most recently housed the junior high school students in Weymouth. The old Weymouth South High School is known as the "Maroon Building." The "Gold Building" was newly constructed for the opening in 2004, and was built on the site of the old South Intermediate School. This expansion cost the school approximately $22 million. In June 2021, Weymouth High School was placed into a state program for schools or districts that disproportionately suspend nonwhite students or students with disabilities.

== Graduation ==
The minimum number of courses that one must take from 9th–12th grade are as follows:

- 3 credits of History courses (US History II required)
- 4 credits of English courses (English I, II, III & senior electives required)
- 4 credits of Mathematics courses (Mathematics courses Geometry & Algebra II required)
- 3 credits of Science courses (minimum of 3 lab sciences)(Biology course required)
- 1.5 credits of Unified Arts (Not required for CTE Students)
- 1.0 credits of Physical Education (CTE students are required to take .4 credits)
- 0.25 credits of Health Education (Typically taken Freshman Year)
