= Braintree Airport =

Braintree Airport (closed)
- IATA: none; ICAO: none

Summary
- Airport type: General aviation
- Owner: Town of Braintree
- Operator: Braintree Airport Commission
- Serves: Metropolitan Boston
- Location: Braintree, Massachusetts
- Elevation AMSL: 110 ft / 34 m
- Coordinates: 42°12′17″N 071°02′19″W

Map
- Location of Braintree Airport

Runways
Direction	Length		Surface
Direction	ft	m	Surface
14/32	2,800	853	dirt

Braintree Airport was an airport located in the town of Braintree, Massachusetts from 1948 to 1968. The airport was used for general aviation purposes until encroaching residential development forced its closure.

== History and usage ==
The Braintree Airport was a single dirt landing strip located in Braintree, Massachusetts. The facility was registered with the Massachusetts Aeronautics Commission, originally as a private landing field. Approval to build the airport was sought by Victor H. Heurlin Jr., a Braintree native and World War II veteran who had been trained to fly while in the military. After his service commitment, he returned to Braintree and stayed in the Air National Guard. Along with other aviation enthusiasts, Heurlin formed the Braintree Airport Association in May 1948 and found a suitable parcel of land, owned by the Braintree Water Commission, near the Great Pond. As the town believed that the presence of an airfield would facilitate economic growth, it agreed to lease the land to the association. Subsequently, the association constructed a 1,200-foot-long (370 m) runway that, by 1959, had been extended to 1,400 feet (430 m).

The airport's location next to Great Pond, the primary source of drinking water for Braintree and several surrounding communities, proved to be problematic. In order to avoid contamination, the commission prohibited the construction of hangars or fueling facilities, restrictions that greatly limited the airport's use. Despite that, Civil Defense officials used the airport as a staging area for nuclear radiation monitoring and emergency communications. Flight training was also offered. By the early 1960s, approximately 30 planes were located at the site. In 1962, the airport was certified for commercial use by the Massachusetts Aeronautics Commission. As part of the certification, the airport was required to have an official on duty whenever the airport was open for use.

== Accidents ==
The airport was the scene of several accidents, which contributed to the facility's eventual closure.

- 1963. Pilot and passenger uninjured in crash. On December 16, 1963, Jack Foster of Allston, Massachusetts, and Paul Micelli of Randolph, Massachusetts, walked away from the crash of their single-engine aircraft about 100 yards (91 m) from the airport's runway. Foster, the pilot, claimed that the plane lost power shortly after take-off. The plane flipped when it struck a clump of trees just beyond the runway and landed upside down. Volunteers from the airport righted the plane and towed it back to the runway after the accident.
- 1967. Pilot and student pilot injured in crash. On October 14, 1967, two men were treated for lacerations and bruises when their plane crashed on West Street in Braintree shortly after takeoff. Everett Anderson of Brockton, Massachusetts, was the aircraft's pilot, and Donald Carvin of Sharon, Massachusetts was his student.
- 1968. Pilot killed in crash. On August 24, 1968, Wilfred Bleakley of Milton, Massachusetts, was killed when his single-engine plane crashed on Pond Road, not far from the airport. Eyewitnesses claimed that the pilot may have misjudged his approach to the airport and, as a result, collided with trees on the side of the road. After shearing off several tree limbs, the plane crashed onto the street and was consumed by fire.

== Closure and aftermath ==
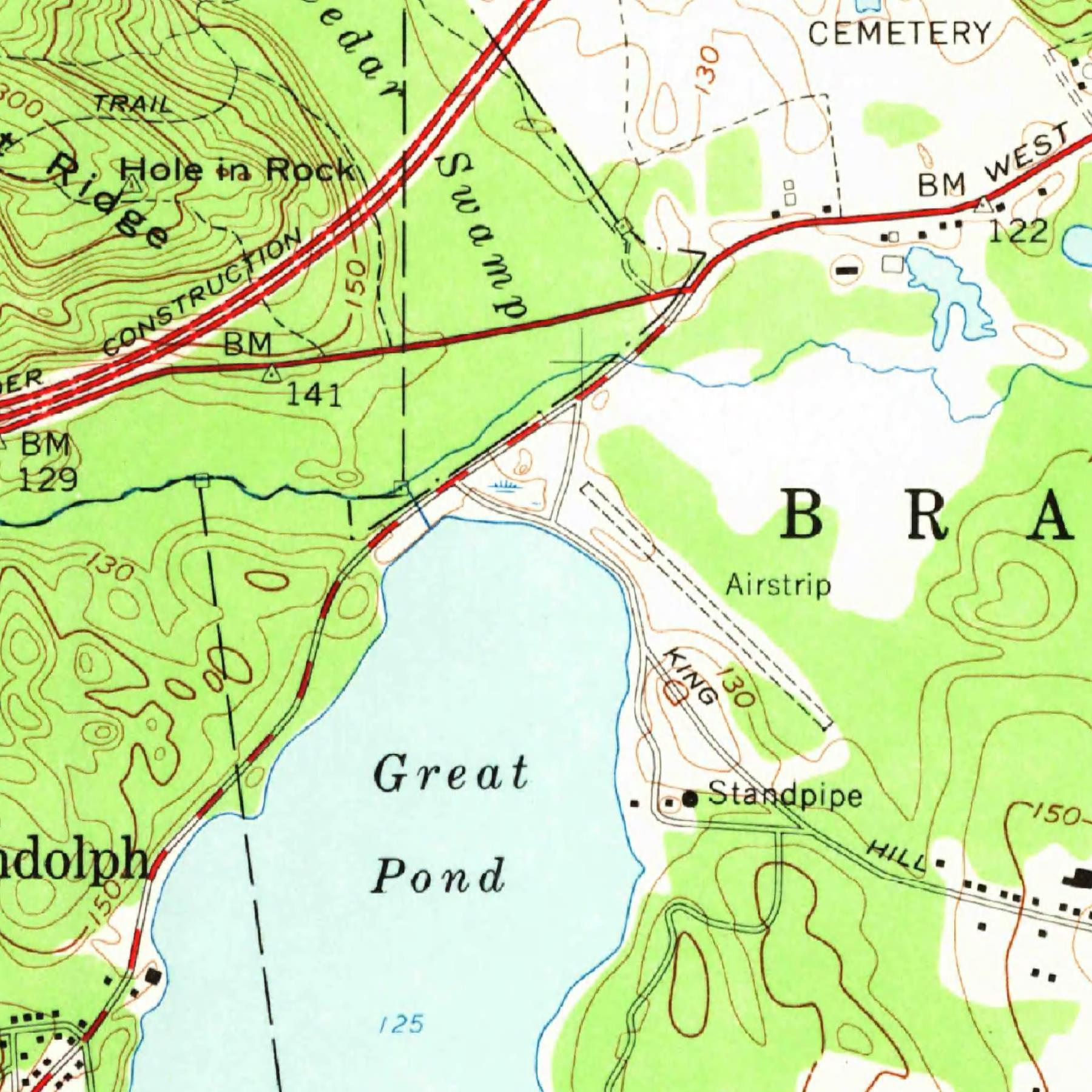
1965 U.S. Geological Survey map of Braintree airport

By 1964, association members had spent over $75,000 to lengthen the runway to 2,800 feet (850 m) and provide other upgrades to the site, including the construction of an operations building. Notwithstanding, the town started the first of what eventually became several attempts to permanently close the facility. Faced with an order to leave the site, pilots were forced to move their planes to neighboring airports on Boston's South Shore. For several months, only civil defense officials were allowed to fly from Braintree. In 1965, the town reversed course and once again allowed the association to use the airport while the water commission evaluated plans to enlarge Great Pond. Efforts to close the airport accelerated after a fatal 1968 accident that resulted in local residents petitioning the town government for the airport's closure. In 1968, the water commission terminated the airport's lease and directed the removal of all planes and property.

As of 2013, the areas of Great Pond surrounding the former airport grounds are closed to the public.
