= Milton High School (Massachusetts) =

Coordinates: 42°15′04.66″N 71°05′14.00″W

Location
- 25 Gile Road; Milton, Massachusetts; United States

Information
- Type: Public Coeducational
- Principal: Karen J. Cahill
- Teaching staff: 87.12 (on an FTE basis)
- Grades: 9–12
- Enrollment: 1,083 (2024-2025)
- Student to teacher ratio: 12.43
- Colors: red and white
- Athletics conference: Bay State Conference
- Mascot: Wildcat
- Website: www.miltonps.org/o/mhs

Milton High School is a public high school located in Milton, Massachusetts, United States, educating grades 9 through 12 with over a thousand students enrolled.

== Academics ==
Milton High School offers Advanced Placement courses in twenty-four subjects, including: Music Theory, 2-D Art and Design, 3-D Art and Design, English Language & Composition, English Literature & Composition, US History, European History, US Government and Politics, Macroeconomics, Microeconomics, African American Studies, Psychology, Spanish Language, French Language, Calculus AB, Calculus BC, Precalculus, Statistics, Computer Science Principles, Computer Science A, Biology, Chemistry, Physics 1, and Physics 2.

== Sports ==
The Wildcats compete in the Bay State Conference. Fall Varsity Sports in Milton include: Cheerleading (Co-ed), Cross Country (Girls/Boys), Field Hockey, Football (Co-ed), Golf (Coed), Soccer (Girls/Boys), Swim (Co-ed), and Volleyball (Co-ed). Winter Varsity Sports include Basketball (Girls/Boys), Dance (Co-ed), Ice Hockey (Girls/Boys), Indoor Track and Field (Girls/Boys), Ski Team (Girls/Boys), Wrestling (Co-ed). Spring Varsity Sports include Baseball, Lacrosse (Girls/Boys), Outdoor Track, and Field (Girls/Boys), Softball, Volleyball (Boys), Tennis (Girls/Boys), Crew (Girls/Boys), and Rugby (Co-ed).

=== State championships ===
- Girls Hockey 2026
- Mens basketball: 1988, 1996 and 2009
- Mens lacrosse: 2000
- Women's cross country- MIAA Division 3: 2010 & 2016.
- Baseball: 2022 and 2023
- Football: 2023
- Boys Rugby Division 2: 2018 & 2019
- Baseball: 2023 & 2024

== Theater ==
The Milton High School theater club, run by Stephen and Laura Markarian, won the Massachusetts Educational Theater Guild (METG) one-act competition in 2025 and 2026. They also went to state finals in 2023 & 2024. They were also nominated for Best Overall Production in 2024, 2025, & 2026 at the METG musical theater awards. In 2024, Milton High School sent student Greta Cardoza to the Jimmy Awards.

== Massachusetts Comprehensive Assessment System ==
2006 MCAS Results (Grade 10):

Subject	Advanced	Proficient	Needs Improvement	Failing
Reading	25%	57%	14%	4%
Math	10%	43%	42%	5%

== Notable alumni ==
- Rich Hill (baseball player)
- James Martorano
- Johny Martorano
- Keith Yandle (Florida Panthers)
