= Braintree, Massachusetts =

- City
- Town of Braintree, Massachusetts
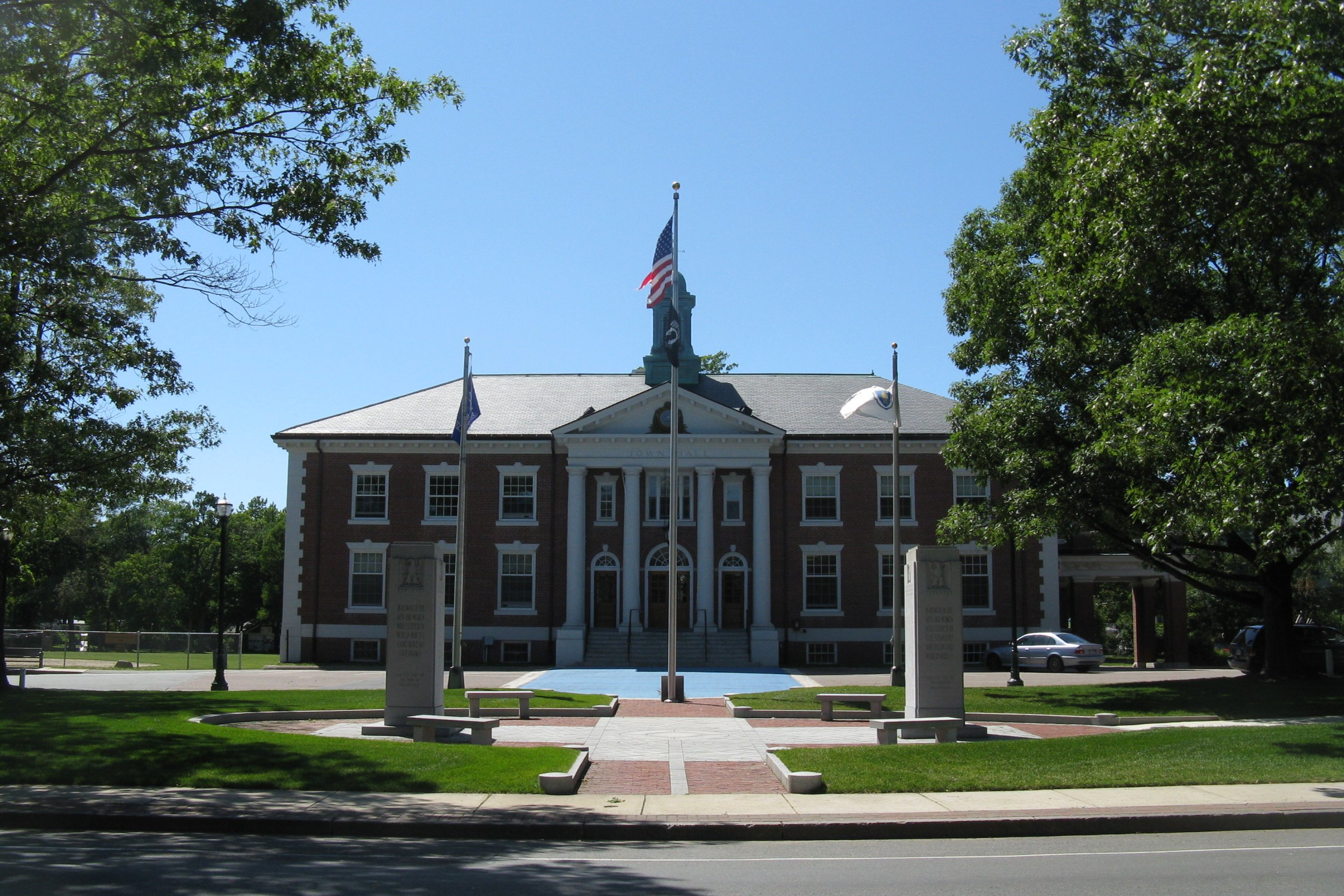
- Braintree Town Hall in 2009

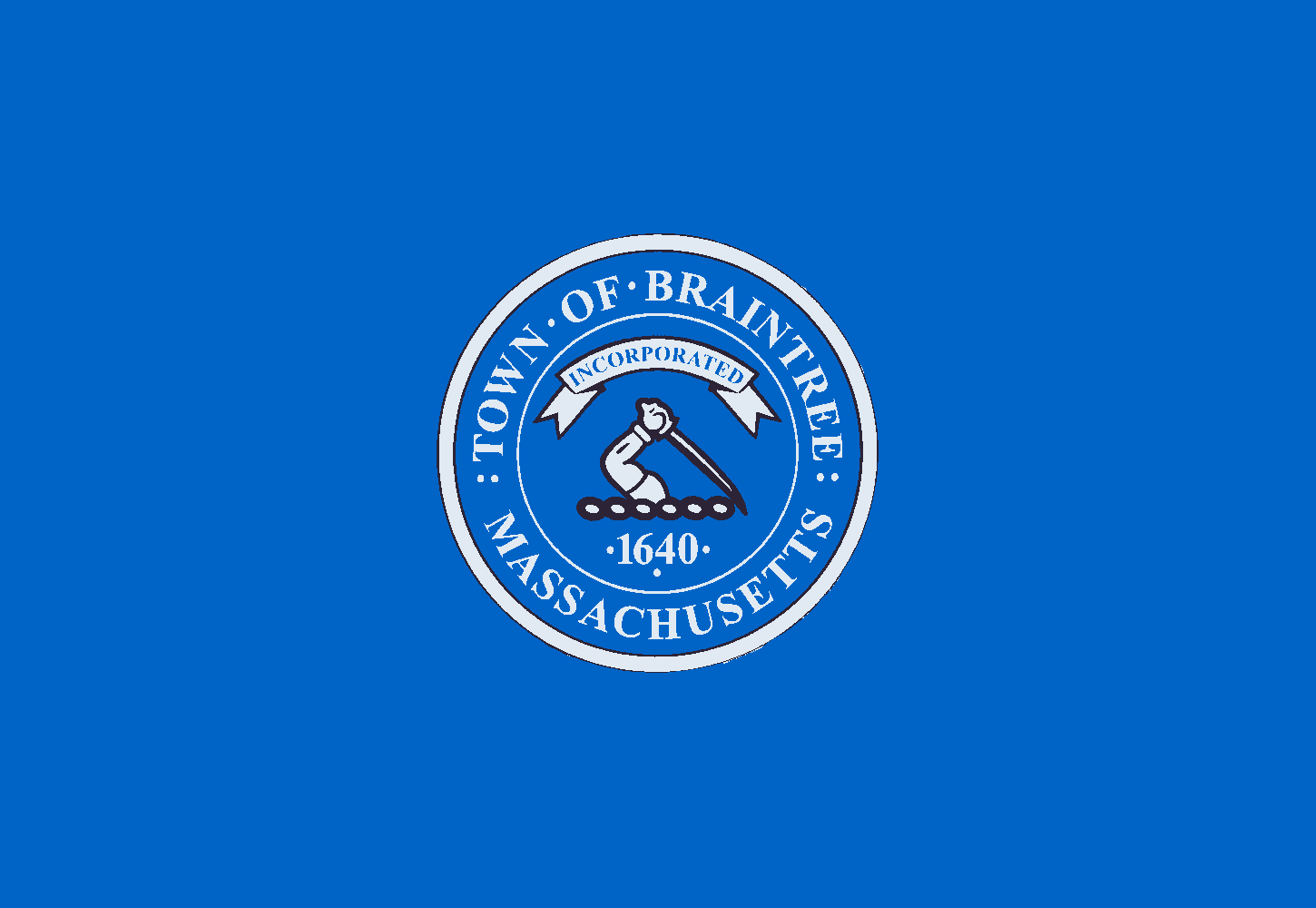
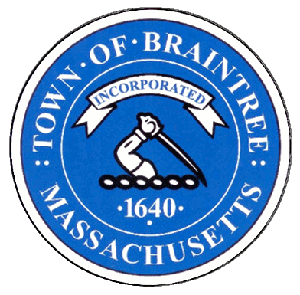
- Flag Seal

- Location of Braintree in Norfolk County, Massachusetts

- Location of Braintree in the United States
- Coordinates: 42.206°N 71.005°W
- Country: United States
- State: Massachusetts
- County: Norfolk
- Settled: 1625; 401 years ago
- Colonized: 1635; 391 years ago
- Incorporated (town): 1640; 386 years ago
- Incorporated (city): 2007; 19 years ago

Government
  - Type: Mayor–council
  - Mayor: Erin Joyce

Area
  - Total: 14.56 sq mi (37.72 km^{2})
  - Land: 13.76 sq mi (35.64 km^{2})
  - Water: 0.80 sq mi (2.08 km^{2})
- Elevation: 89 ft (27 m)

Population (2020)
  - Total: 39,143
  - Density: 2,844.2/sq mi (1,098.16/km^{2})
- Time zone: UTC−5 (Eastern)
  - Summer (DST): UTC−4 (Eastern)
- ZIP Codes: 02184/02185
- Area code: 339 / 781
- FIPS code: 25-07740, 25-07665
- GNIS feature ID: 0618316
- Website: braintreema.gov

Braintree (US: /ˈbreɪnˌtri/), officially the Town of Braintree, is a city in Norfolk County, Massachusetts, United States. It is officially known as a town, but Braintree is a city with a mayor–council form of government, and it is considered a city under Massachusetts law. The population was 39,143 at the 2020 census. It is part of the Greater Boston area, with access to the MBTA Red Line, and is a member of the Metropolitan Area Planning Council's South Shore Coalition. The first mayor of Braintree was Joe Sullivan, who served until January 2020. The current mayor of Braintree is Erin Joyce, who was elected in 2023, defeating incumbent Charles Kokoros.

== History ==
Braintree was colonized in 1635 and incorporated in 1640. The town is named after the Essex town of Braintree. Its original area split to form the municipalities of Quincy (incorporated in 1792) and Randolph (incorporated in 1793) in the late eighteenth century, after which Randolph split to form the municipality of Holbrook (incorporated in 1872) eight decades later. Braintree was part of Suffolk County until the formation of Norfolk County in 1793.

In 1888, the villages of Braintree and South Braintree were separate communities within the town of Braintree.

In 1920, Braintree was the site of the murders that led to the trial of Sacco and Vanzetti. During that same decade, the town's population grew by more than 50%.

In the period after World War II, several Irish American and Italian American families living in lower income portions of Boston moved to Braintree.

== Geography ==
Braintree shares borders with Quincy to the north, Randolph to the west (separated by the Cochato River), Holbrook to the south, and Weymouth to the east.

According to the U.S. Census Bureau, the town has a total area of 14.5 square miles (37.6 km^{2}), of which 13.9 square miles (36.0 km^{2}) is land and 0.6 sq mi (1.6 km^{2}) is water. The total area is 4.34% water.

Park and recreation locations in Braintree include Pond Meadow Park, Sunset Lake, and Blue Hills Reservation.

=== Climate ===
Braintree has a humid continental climate (Köppen Dfa) with some maritime influence. Summers are typically warm to hot, rainy, and humid, while winters oscillate between periods of cold rain and snow, with cold temperatures. Spring and fall are usually mild, with varying conditions dependent on wind direction and jet stream positioning. Prevailing wind patterns that blow offshore minimize the influence of the Atlantic Ocean.

The hottest month is July, with a mean temperature of 69.7 °F (20.9 °C). The coldest month is January, with a mean of 25.7 °F (−3.5 °C). Periods exceeding 90 °F (32 °C) in summer and below freezing in winter are not uncommon but are rarely extended, with about 13 and 25 days per year seeing each, respectively. The city's average window for freezing temperatures is November 9 through April 5. Official temperature records have ranged from −21 °F (−29 °C) in February 1934, up to 101 °F (38 °C) in August 1949 and 1974.

Braintree's coastal location on the North Atlantic moderates its temperature, but makes the city very prone to nor'easter weather systems that can produce much snow and rain. The city averages 48.63 inches (1,240 mm) of precipitation a year, with 61.1 inches (155 cm) of snowfall per season. Snowfall increases dramatically as one goes inland away from the city (especially north and west of the city)—away from the moderating influence of the ocean.

Most snowfall occurs from December through March, as most years see no measurable snow in April and November, and snow is rare in May and October. There is also high year-to-year variability in snowfall; for instance, the winter of 2011−2012 saw only 24.2 in (61.5 cm) of accumulating snow, but in the winter of 2014–2015, the figure was 150.8 in (383 cm).

Fog is fairly common, particularly in spring and early summer, and the occasional tropical storm or hurricane can threaten the region, especially in late summer and early autumn. The last such storm to impact the city was Hurricane Sandy in October 2012. Due to its situation along the North Atlantic, the city is often subjected to sea breezes, especially in the late spring, when water temperatures are still quite cold and temperatures at the coast can be more than 20 °F (11 °C) colder than locations a few miles inland, sometimes dropping by that amount near midday.

Thunderstorms occur from May to September and are occasionally severe, with large hail, damaging winds and heavy downpours. Although Braintree has never been struck by a violent tornado, the city has experienced many tornado warnings. Damaging storms are more common in areas north, west, and northwest of the city.

Climate data for Blue Hills Reservation (Blue Hill Meteorological Observatory), 1991−2020 normals, extremes 1893−present
Month	Jan	Feb	Mar	Apr	May	Jun	Jul	Aug	Sep	Oct	Nov	Dec	Year
Record high °F (°C)	68 (20)	71 (22)	89 (32)	94 (34)	96 (36)	99 (37)	100 (38)	101 (38)	99 (37)	88 (31)	81 (27)	74 (23)	101 (38)
Mean maximum °F (°C)	56.6 (13.7)	56.9 (13.8)	65.6 (18.7)	79.4 (26.3)	87.3 (30.7)	90.0 (32.2)	92.9 (33.8)	91.3 (32.9)	86.9 (30.5)	77.6 (25.3)	68.4 (20.2)	60.0 (15.6)	94.7 (34.8)
Mean daily maximum °F (°C)	34.7 (1.5)	37.0 (2.8)	44.1 (6.7)	56.3 (13.5)	66.8 (19.3)	75.4 (24.1)	81.7 (27.6)	80.2 (26.8)	72.7 (22.6)	61.0 (16.1)	50.1 (10.1)	40.2 (4.6)	58.4 (14.6)
Daily mean °F (°C)	26.5 (−3.1)	28.2 (−2.1)	35.5 (1.9)	47.1 (8.4)	58.5 (14.7)	66.5 (19.2)	72.7 (22.6)	71.4 (21.9)	64.2 (17.9)	52.5 (11.4)	42.0 (5.6)	32.5 (0.3)	49.8 (9.9)
Mean daily minimum °F (°C)	18.3 (−7.6)	19.5 (−6.9)	26.9 (−2.8)	37.9 (3.3)	48.2 (9.0)	57.6 (14.2)	63.8 (17.7)	62.6 (17.0)	55.6 (13.1)	44.0 (6.7)	33.8 (1.0)	24.9 (−3.9)	41.1 (5.1)
Mean minimum °F (°C)	0.0 (−17.8)	3.1 (−16.1)	10.1 (−12.2)	26.7 (−2.9)	37.5 (3.1)	45.9 (7.7)	54.9 (12.7)	53.4 (11.9)	42.3 (5.7)	30.5 (−0.8)	19.6 (−6.9)	8.7 (−12.9)	−2.5 (−19.2)
Record low °F (°C)	−14 (−26)	−21 (−29)	−5 (−21)	6 (−14)	27 (−3)	36 (2)	44 (7)	39 (4)	28 (−2)	21 (−6)	5 (−15)	−19 (−28)	−21 (−29)
Average precipitation inches (mm)	4.50 (114)	4.00 (102)	5.52 (140)	4.76 (121)	3.82 (97)	4.63 (118)	3.47 (88)	3.91 (99)	4.06 (103)	5.49 (139)	4.31 (109)	5.39 (137)	53.86 (1,367)
Average snowfall inches (cm)	18.6 (47)	18.2 (46)	15.0 (38)	2.8 (7.1)	0.0 (0.0)	0.0 (0.0)	0.0 (0.0)	0.0 (0.0)	0.0 (0.0)	0.7 (1.8)	1.8 (4.6)	12.6 (32)	69.7 (176.5)
Average extreme snow depth inches (cm)	10.6 (27)	11.5 (29)	9.8 (25)	2.6 (6.6)	0.0 (0.0)	0.0 (0.0)	0.0 (0.0)	0.0 (0.0)	0.0 (0.0)	0.3 (0.76)	1.3 (3.3)	7.7 (20)	17.1 (43)
Average precipitation days (≥ 0.01 in)	13.2	11.3	12.5	12.5	13.0	12.1	10.5	10.2	9.2	11.5	10.9	12.6	139.5
Average snowy days (≥ 0.1 in)	8.1	7.1	5.7	1.3	0.0	0.0	0.0	0.0	0.0	0.4	1.3	5.3	29.2
Mean monthly sunshine hours	132.1	146.7	174.0	185.6	220.2	231.8	258.1	242.5	204.1	182.1	133.3	125.9	2,236.4
Percentage possible sunshine	46.3	50.9	48.5	47.9	50.4	52.7	58.0	58.7	56.7	55.1	47.0	45.9	51.5
Source 1: NOAA
Source 2: BHO

== Demographics ==
Historical population
Year	Pop.	±%
1790	2,771	—
1800	1,285	−53.6%
1810	1,351	+5.1%
1820	1,466	+8.5%
1830	1,758	+19.9%
1840	2,168	+23.3%
1850	2,969	+36.9%
1860	3,468	+16.8%
1870	3,948	+13.8%
1880	3,855	−2.4%
1890	4,848	+25.8%
1900	5,981	+23.4%
1910	8,066	+34.9%
1920	10,580	+31.2%
1930	15,712	+48.5%
1940	16,378	+4.2%
1950	23,161	+41.4%
1960	31,069	+34.1%
1970	35,050	+12.8%
1980	36,337	+3.7%
1990	33,836	−6.9%
2000	33,828	−0.0%
2010	35,744	+5.7%
2020	39,143	+9.5%
2024*	39,134	−0.0%
* = population estimate. Source: United States census records and Population Estimates Program data. Source: U.S. Decennial Census

As of the census of 2000, there were 33,828 people, 12,652 households, and 8,907 families residing in the town. The population density was 2,434.4 inhabitants per square mile (939.9/km^{2}). There were 12,973 housing units at an average density of 933.6 per square mile (360.5/km^{2}). The racial makeup of the town was 93.96% White, 1.18% Black or African American, 0.11% Native American, 3.14% Asian, 0.03% Pacific Islander, 0.64% from other races, and 0.95% from two or more races. Hispanic or Latino people of any race were 1.16% of the population.

More than 46% of town residents had Irish ancestry. As of 2014, Braintree had the second highest concentration of Irish Americans in the entire country, slightly behind Scituate, Massachusetts.

There were 12,652 households, out of which 29.6% had children under the age of 18 living with them, 55.4% were married couples living together, 11.7% had a female householder with no husband present, and 29.6% were non-families. 24.4% of all households were made up of individuals, and 11.9% had someone living alone who was 65 years of age or older. The average household size was 2.61 and the average family size was 3.16.

In the town the population was spread out, with 22.5% under the age of 18, 6.5% from 18 to 24, 28.9% from 25 to 44, 24.0% from 45 to 64, and 18.1% who were 65 years of age or older. The median age was 40 years. For every 100 females, there were 89.1 males. For every 100 females age 18 and over, there were 84.4 males.

The median income for a household in the town was $85,590, and the median income for a family was $90,590 as of a 2007 estimate). Males had a median income of $89,607 versus $36,034 for females. The per capita income for the town was $28,683. About 2.1% of families and 3.8% of the population were below the poverty line, including 4.6% of those under age 18 and 3.3% of those age 65 or over.

== Economy ==
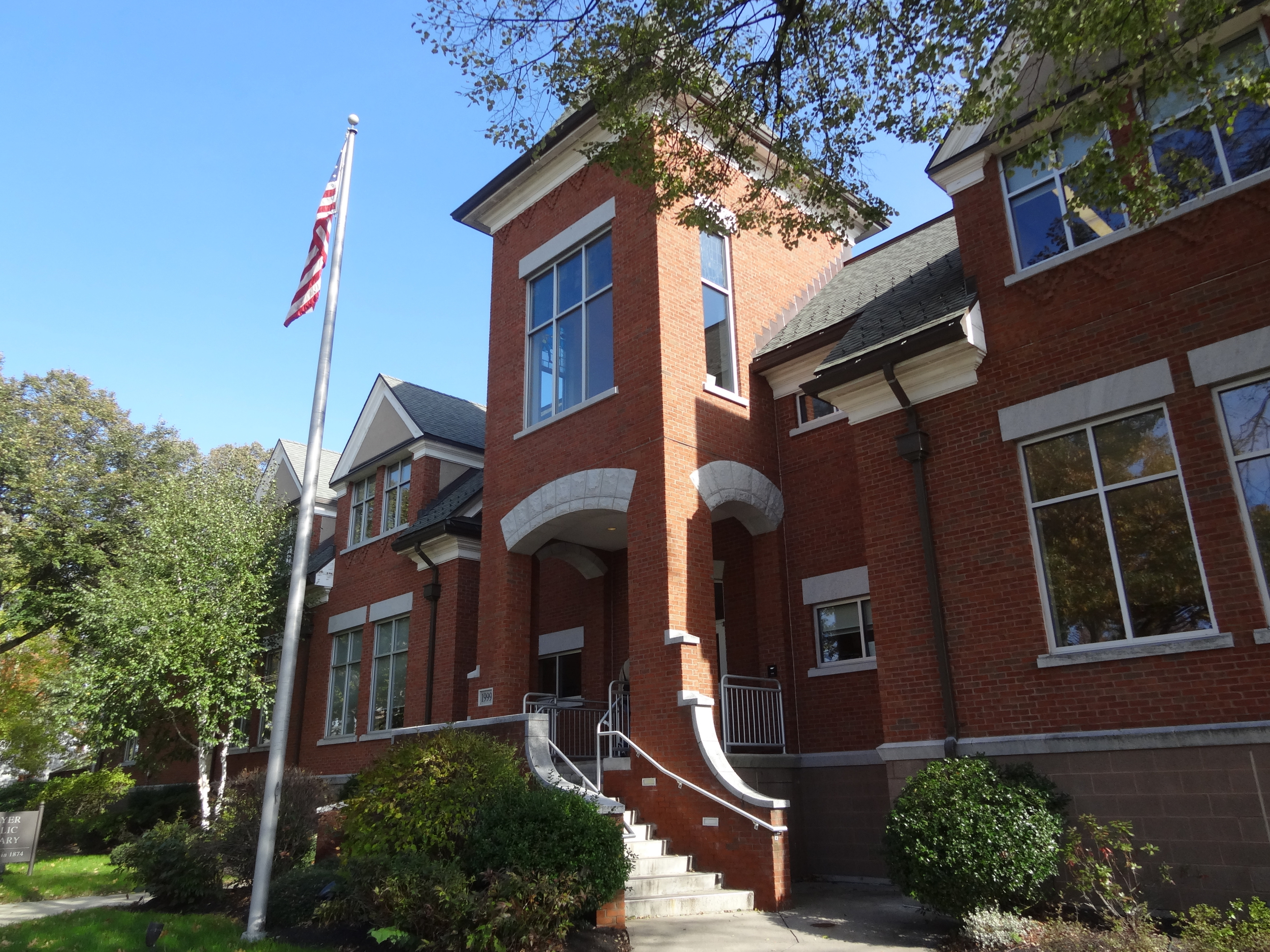
Thayer Public Library

Braintree is home to several large companies, including Altra Industrial Motion, Greater Media, and TopSource LLC.

From 1964 to 1991, Braintree was the location of the largest Valle's Steak House in the restaurant chain. One of the chain's busiest locations, it was capable of serving over 5,000 customers per day. In 1980, then presidential candidate Ronald Reagan made a campaign speech at a South Shore Chamber of Commerce luncheon held there.

== Arts and culture ==
=== Points of interest ===
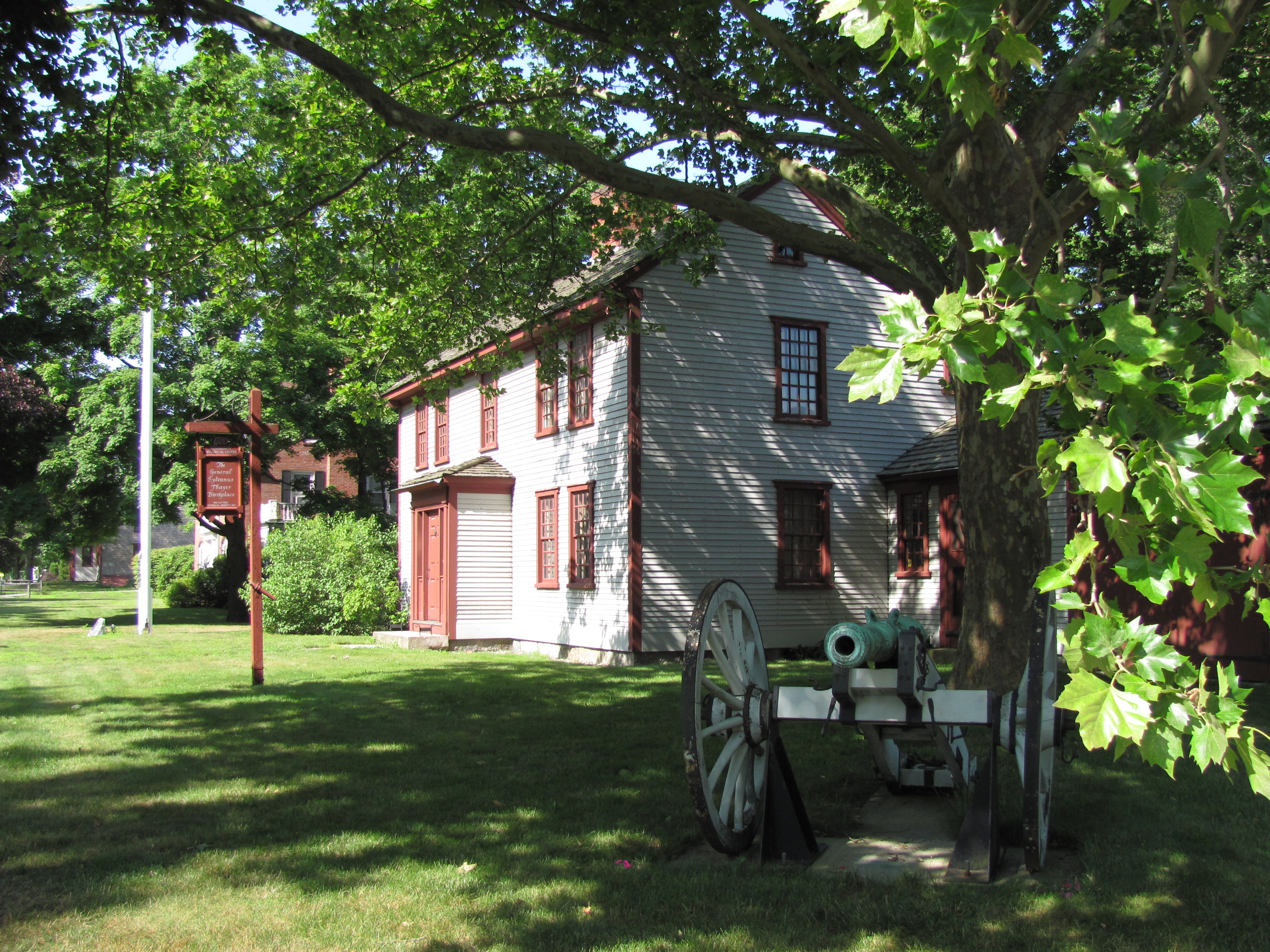
General Sylvanus Thayer Birthplace

- General Sylvanus Thayer Birthplace
- Hollingsworth Park
- Monatiquot River
- Pond Meadow Park
- South Shore Plaza
- Sunset Lake

== Education ==
Braintree is home to various educational institutions, both private and public.

=== Public primary and secondary education ===
Public education at the primary and secondary levels is managed by Braintree Public Schools (BPS), a system that includes an integrated preschool lab within Braintree High School, six elementary schools, two middle schools and one high school. Braintree formerly had a kindergarten center, but it was closed in 2024.

==== Public high school ====
- Braintree High School

==== Public middle schools ====
- East Middle School
- South Middle School

==== Public elementary schools ====
- Flaherty Elementary School
- Highlands Elementary School
- Hollis Elementary School
- Liberty Elementary School
- Morrison Elementary School
- Ross Elementary School

==== Public kindergarten centers ====
- None (previously, Monatiquot School Kindergarten Center)

=== Private and alternative education ===
Private and alternative education institutions in Braintree include Thayer Academy, Archbishop Williams High School, and CATS Academy Boston.

== Infrastructure ==
=== Transportation ===
Braintree is situated in the Greater Boston Area, which has rail, air, and highway facilities. State Route 128 and Interstate 95 divide the region into inner and outer zones, which are connected by numerous "spokes" providing direct access to the airport, port, and intermodal facilities of Boston.

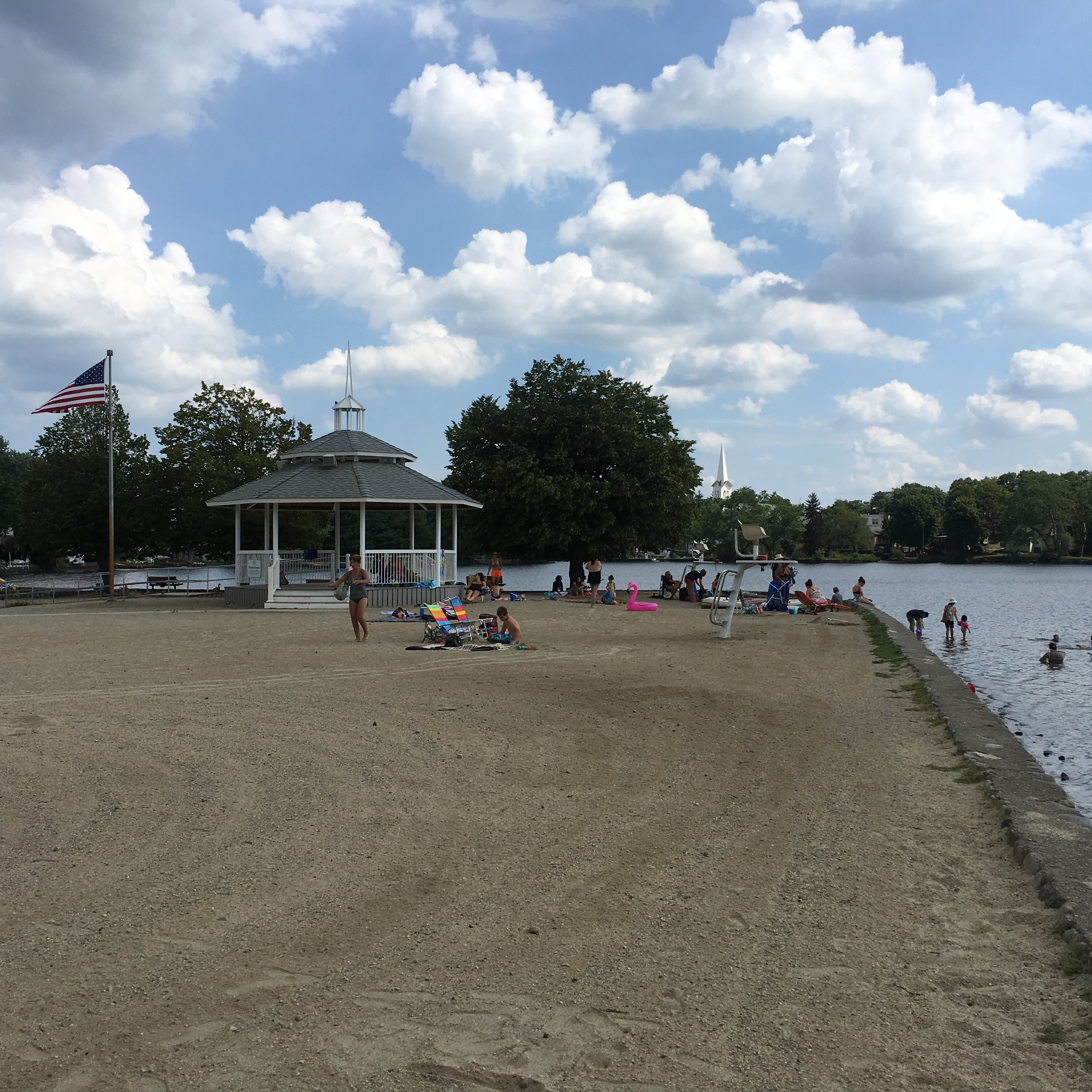
Sunset Lake provides recreational opportunities for residents. The steeple in the background is part of the South Congregational Church.

Principal highways in Braintree are Interstate 93 (which runs concurrently with U.S. 1) and Route 3, as well as 37, and 53. Entering Braintree from the north, I-93, Route 1, and Route 3 all run concurrently as the Southeast Expressway from Boston; in Braintree they diverge, with Route 3 heading south toward Cape Cod as the Pilgrims Highway, and I-93 and Route 1 heading west toward Route 128.

Braintree station is served by the rapid transit Red Line, two MBTA Commuter Rail lines (Fall River/New Bedford Line and Kingston Line), and seasonal CapeFLYER service. Weymouth Landing/East Braintree station on the Braintree/Weymouth border is served by the Greenbush Line. Freight rail service is operated by Fore River Transportation Corporation, and CSX Transportation.

From 1948 to 1968, the town was the home of Braintree Airport, a general aviation airport located near Great Pond that was used by civil defense officials and private pilots. The airport featured a 2,800-foot (850 m) dirt runway and offered flight training. Residential development, proximity to the town's water supply, and a number of accidents led to its closure in 1968.

=== Water and sewer ===
In 2020, Braintree, Randolph, and Holbrook formed a regional drinking water supply agency, the Tri-Town Water Board. Braintree operates its own water treatment plant, while a second treatment plant serves the Randolph-Holbrook Joint Water Board.

== Notable people ==
- Abigail Adams, wife of President John Adams; mother of John Quincy Adams
- Henry Adams, original emigrant to the Americas
- Jeremy Adams, original emigrant to the Americas
- John Adams, second president of the United States; first Vice President of the United States; signer of the U.S. Declaration of Independence
- John Quincy Adams, diplomat, sixth President of the United States; member of the United States House of Representatives
- Joe Amorosino, reporter and sports director for WHDH-TV
- Amy Bishop, perpetrator of the 2010 University of Alabama in Huntsville shooting
- Oscar Florianus Bluemner, German-born American Modernist painter
- Scott Caldwell, soccer player
- Jim Calhoun, former head coach of University of Connecticut men's basketball team
- Priscilla Chan, philanthropist and pediatrician; wife of Mark Zuckerberg
- Anthony Devaney, electrical engineer
- Chris Doherty, musician and recording artist from the band Gang Green
- Adam Gaudette, NHL player
- Brian Gibbons, NHL player
- John Hancock, signer of the U.S. Declaration of Independence; fourth president of the Continental Congress; first and third Governor of the Commonwealth of Massachusetts; diplomat and statesman
- Henry Hope, member of the Dutch bankers Hope & Co.
- Colin Kilrain, vice admiral, Navy Seal, US Navy (Ret.)
- Peter Kormann, gymnast and winner of the bronze medal in men's floor competition at the 1976 Olympics
- Don McKenney, hockey center; captain of the Boston Bruins, 1954–1963
- Jose Offerman, baseball player for the Boston Red Sox
- John O'Keefe, former Boston police officer
- Stanzi Potenza, actor and TikToker
- William Rosenberg, creator of the Dunkin' Donuts restaurant chain
- Nick Santino, founding member of the American rock band A Rocket to the Moon
- Butch Stearns, sports anchorman; Chief Content Officer for the Pulse Network
- Sylvanus Thayer, superintendent of the U.S. Military Academy; called "the father of West Point"
- Mo Vaughn, baseball player for the Boston Red Sox
- Donnie Wahlberg, record producer, songwriter, singer, actor; founding member of the musical group New Kids on the Block
- Mark Wahlberg, film and television producer; Academy Award-nominated actor; former lead singer of Marky Mark and the Funky Bunch
- Thomas A. Watson, primary assistant of Alexander Graham Bell; assisted in invention of the telephone; founder of Fore River Shipyard

== Filming locations ==
- June 1969: Tell Me That You Love Me, Junie Moon, directed by Otto Preminger (sequence filmed at 710 West Street)
- April 2008: Paul Blart: Mall Cop, directed by Steve Carr (sequence filmed in the South Shore Plaza)
- September 2009: What Doesn't Kill You, directed by Brian Goodman (sequence filmed at the Mobil station on Elm Street)
- April 2016: Stronger, directed by David Gordon Green (sequence filmed at the Skyline Drive apartment complex)
- April 2021: The Tender Bar, directed by George Clooney (sequences filmed at the former 99 Restaurant at South Shore Plaza, inside home at 45 Calvin Street, and outdoors on Calvin Street).
