= List of school districts in Massachusetts =

This is a list of school districts in Massachusetts.

The majority of school districts in the state are dependent on town governments. Some are dependent on city governments, two are dependent on county governments, and Lawrence Public School District is directly a part of the state government. The U.S. Census Bureau does not consider any of these to be independent governments. It does consider the regional school districts, regional vocational-technical school districts, and independent vocational schools to be independent governments.

== Local school districts ==
Non-operating local school districts, which are those districts that do not operate any school facilities and where all students attend school in regional academic school districts, are not listed.

=== A ===
- Abington School Department (Plymouth County, PK–12; also serves SouthField through a grade tuition agreement)
- Acushnet School Department (Bristol County, PK–8)
- Agawam School Department (Hampden County, PK–12)
- Amesbury School Department (Essex County, PK–12)
- Amherst School Department (Hampshire County, PK–6)
- Andover Public Schools (Essex County, PK–12)
- Arlington School Department (Middlesex County, PK–12)
- Ashland School Department (Middlesex County, PK–12)
- Attleborough School Department (Bristol County, PK–12)
- Auburn School Department (Worcester County, PK–12)
- Avon School District (Norfolk County, PK–12)

=== B ===
- Barnstable Public School District (Barnstable County, PK–12)
- Bedford Public Schools (Middlesex County, PK–12)
- Belchertown School Department (Hampshire County, PK–12)
- Bellingham School Department (Norfolk County, PK–12)
- Belmont Public Schools (Middlesex County, PK-12)
- Berkley School Department (Bristol County, PK–8)
- Beverly School Department (Essex County, PK–12)
- Billerica School Department (Middlesex County, PK–12)
- Boston Public Schools (Suffolk County, PK–12)
- Bourne School Department (Barnstable County, PK–12)
- Boxford School Department (Essex County, PK–6)
- Braintree Public Schools (Norfolk County, PK–12)
- Brewster School Department (Barnstable County, PK–5)
- Brimfield School Department (Hampden County, PK–6)
- Brockton School Department (Plymouth County, PK–12)
- Brookfield School Department (Worcester County, PK–6)
- Brookline Public Schools (Norfolk County, PK–12)
- Burlington Public Schools (Middlesex Sounty, PK–12)

=== C ===
- Cambridge School Department (Middlesex County, PK–12)
- Canton School Department (Norfolk County, PK–12)
- Carlisle School Department (Middlesex County, PK–8)
- Carver School Department (Plymouth County, PK–12)
- Chelmsford School Department (Middlesex County, PK–12)
- Chelsea School Department (Suffolk County, PK–12)
- Chicopee School Department (Hampden County, PK–12)
- Clarksburg School Department (Berkshire County, K–8)
- Clinton School Department (Worcester County, PK–12)
- Cohasset School Department (Norfolk County, PK–12)
- Concord School Department (Middlesex County, PK–8)
- Conway School Department (Franklin County, PK–6)

=== D ===
- Danvers School Department (Essex County, PK–12)
- Dartmouth School Department (Bristol County, PK–12)
- Dedham School Department (Norfolk County, PK–12)
- Deerfield School Department (Franklin County, PK–6)
- Douglas School Department (Worcester County, PK–12)
- Dover School Department (Norfolk County, PK–5)
- Dracut School Department (Middlesex County, PK–12)
- Duxbury School Department (Plymouth County, PK–12)

=== E ===
- East Bridgewater School Department (Plymouth County, PK–12)
- East Longmeadow School Department (Hampden County, PK–12)
- Eastham School Department (Barnstable County, PK–5)
- Easthampton School Department (Hampshire County, PK–12)
- Easton School Department (Bristol County, PK–12)
- Edgartown School Department (Dukes County, PK–8)
- Erving School Department (Franklin County, PK–6)
- Everett School Department (Middlesex County, PK–12)

=== F ===
- Fairhaven School Department (Bristol County, PK–12; also serving Acushnet (9–12) through a grade tuition agreement)
- Fall River School Department (Bristol County, PK–12)
- Falmouth School Department (Barnstable County, PK–12; also serving Gosnold (PK–1, 8–12) through a grade tuition agreement)
- Fitchburg School Department (Worcester County, PK–12)
- Florida School Department (Berkshire County, PK–8; also serving Monroe through a grade tuition agreement)
- Foxborough Public Schools (Norfolk County, PK–12)
- Framingham School Department (Middlesex County, PK–12)
- Franklin School Department (Norfolk County, PK–12)

=== G ===
- Gardner School Department (Worcester County, PK–12)
- Georgetown School Department (Essex County, PK–12)
- Gloucester School Department (Essex County, PK–12)
- Gosnold School Department (Dukes County, 2–7)
- Grafton School Department (Worcester County, PK–12)
- Granby School Department (Hampshire County, PK–12)
- Greenfield School Department (Franklin County, PK–12)

=== H ===
- Hadley School Department (Hampshire County, PK–12)
- Halifax School Department (Plymouth County, K–6)
- Hancock School Department (Berkshire County, PK–6)
- Hanover School Department (Plymouth County, PK–12)
- Harvard School Department (Worcester County, PK–12; also serving Devens through a grade tuition agreement)
- Hatfield School Department (Hampshire County, PK–12)
- Haverhill Public Schools (Essex County, PK-12)
- Hingham School Department (Plymouth County, PK–12)
- Holbrook School Department (Norfolk County, PK–12)
- Holland School Department (Hampden County, PK–6)
- Holliston School Department (Middlesex County, PK–12)
- Holyoke School Department (Hampden County, PK–12)
- Hopedale School Department (Worcester County, PK–12)
- Hopkinton School Department (Middlesex County, PK–12)
- Hudson School Department (Middlesex County, PK–12)
- Hull School Department (Plymouth County, PK–12)

=== I ===
- Ipswich School Department (Essex County, PK–12)

=== K ===
- Kingston School Department (Plymouth County, K–6)

=== L ===
- Lawrence Public Schools (Essex County, PK–12)
- Lee School Department (Berkshire County, PK–12; also serving Tyringham as well as grades 7–12 from Farmington River Regional through grade tuition agreements)
- Leicester School Department (Worcester County, PK–12)
- Lenox School Department (Berkshire County, PK–12)
- Leominster School Department (Worcester County, PK–12)
- Leverett School Department (Franklin County, PK–6)
- Lexington Public Schools (Middlesex County, PK–12)
- Lincoln School Department (Middlesex County, PK–8)
- Littleton School Department (Middlesex County, PK–12)
- Longmeadow School Department (Hampden County, PK–12)
- Lowell Public Schools (Middlesex County, PK–12)
- Ludlow School Department (Hampden County, PK–12)
- Lunenburg School Department (Worcester County, PK–12)
- Lynn School Department (Essex County, PK–12)
- Lynnfield School Department (Essex County, PK–12)

=== M ===
- Malden School Department (Middlesex County, PK–12)
- Mansfield School Department (Bristol County, PK–12)
- Marblehead School Department (Essex County, PK–12)
- Marion School Department (Plymouth County, PK–6)
- Marlborough School Department (Middlesex County, PK–12)
- Marshfield School Department (Plymouth County, PK–12)
- Mashpee School Department (Barnstable County, PK–12)
- Mattapoisett School Department (Plymouth County, PK–6)
- Maynard School Department (Middlesex County, PK–12)
- Medfield Public Schools (Norfolk County, PK–12)
- Medford Public Schools (Middlesex County, PK–12)
- Medway Public Schools (Norfolk County, PK–12)
- Melrose School Department (Middlesex County, PK–12)
- Methuen School Department (Essex County, PK–12)
- Middleborough School Department (Plymouth County, PK–12)
- Middleton School Department (Essex County, PK–6)
- Milford School Department (Worcester County, PK–12)
- Millbury School Department (Worcester County, PK–12)
- Millis School Department (Norfolk County, PK–12)
- Milton School Department (Norfolk County, PK–12)
- Monson School Department (Hampden County, PK–12)

=== N ===
- Nahant School Department (Essex County, K–6)
- Nantucket School Department (Nantucket, PK–12)
- Natick School Department (Middlesex County, PK–12)
- Needham School Department (Norfolk County, PK–12)
- New Bedford Public Schools (Bristol County, PK–12; also serving Acushnet (9–12) through a grade tuition agreement)
- Newburyport School Department (Essex County, PK–12)
- Newton Public Schools (Middlesex County, PK–12)
- Norfolk School Department (Norfolk County, PK–6)
- North Adams School Department (Berkshire County, PK–12; also serving Clarksburg (9–12), Florida (9–12) and Monroe (9–12) through grade tuition agreements)
- North Andover Public Schools (Essex County, PK–12)
- North Attleborough School Department (Bristol County, PK–12)
- North Brookfield School Department (Worcester County, K–12)
- North Reading School Department (Middlesex County, PK–12)
- Northampton School Department (Hampshire County, PK–12)
- Northborough School Department (Worcester County, PK–8)
- Northbridge Public Schools (Worcester County, PK–12)
- Norton School Department (Bristol County, PK–12)
- Norwell School Department (Plymouth County, PK–12)
- Norwood School Department (Norfolk County, PK–12)

=== O ===
- Oak Bluffs School Department (Dukes County, PK–8)
- Orange School Department (Franklin County, PK–6)
- Orleans School Department (Barnstable County, K–5)
- Oxford School Department (Worcester County, PK–12)

=== P ===
- Palmer School Department (Hampden County, PK–12)
- Peabody School Department (Essex County, PK–12)
- Pelham School Department (Hampshire County, K–6)
- Pembroke School Department (Plymouth County, PK–12)
- Petersham School Department (Worcester County, K–6)
- Pittsfield School Department (Berkshire County, PK–12; also serving Richmond (9–12) through a grade tuition agreement)
- Plainville School Department (Norfolk County, PK–6)
- Plymouth School Department (Plymouth County, PK–12)
- Plympton School Department (Plymouth County, K–6)
- Provincetown School Department (Barnstable County, PK–8; also serving Truro (7–8) through a grade tuition agreement)

=== Q ===
- Quincy Public Schools (Norfolk County, PK–12)

=== R ===
- Randolph School Department (Norfolk County, PK–12)
- Reading School Department (Middlesex County, PK–12)
- Revere Public Schools (Suffolk County, PK–12)
- Richmond School Department (Berkshire County, PK–8)
- Rochester School Department (Plymouth County, PK–6)
- Rockland School Department (Plymouth County, PK–12; also serves SouthField through a grade tuition agreement)
- Rockport School Department (Essex County, PK–12)
- Rowe School Department (Franklin County, K–6)

=== S ===
- Salem School Department (Essex County, PK–12)
- Sandwich School Department (Barnstable County, PK–12)
- Saugus School Department (Essex County, PK–12)
- Savoy School Department (Berkshire County, PK–6)
- Scituate School Department (Plymouth County, PK–12)
- Seekonk School Department (Bristol County, PK–12)
- Sharon School Department (Norfolk County, PK–12)
- Sherborn School Department (Middlesex County, PK–5)
- Shrewsbury School Department (Worcester County, PK–12)
- Shutesbury School Department (Franklin County, PK–6)
- Somerset School Department (Bristol County, PK–8)
- Somerville School Department (Middlesex County, PK–12)
- South Hadley Public Schools (Hampshire County, PK–12)
- Southampton School Department (Hampshire County, PK–6)
- Southborough School Department (Worcester County, PK–8)
- Southbridge School Department (Worcester County, PK–12)
- Springfield Public Schools (Hampden County, PK–12)
- Stoneham School Department (Middlesex County, PK–12)
- Stoughton School Department (Norfolk County, PK–12)
- Sturbridge School Department (Worcester County, PK–6)
- Sudbury Public Schools (Middlesex County, PK–8)
- Sunderland School Department (Franklin County, PK–6)
- Sutton School Department (Worcester County, PK–12)
- Swampscott School Department (Essex County, PK–12; also serving Nahant (7–12) through a grade tuition agreement)
- Swansea School Department (Bristol County, PK–12)

=== T ===
- Taunton School Department (Bristol County, PK–12)
- Tewksbury School Department (Middlesex County, PK–12)
- Tisbury School Department (Dukes County, PK–8)
- Topsfield School Department (Essex County, PK–6)
- Truro School Department (Barnstable County, PK–6)
- Tyngsborough School Department (Middlesex County, PK–12)

=== U ===
- Uxbridge School Department (Worcester County, PK–12)

=== W ===
- Wakefield School Department (Middlesex County, PK–12)
- Wales School Department (Hampden County, PK–6)
- Walpole School Department (Norfolk County, PK–12)
- Waltham School Department (Middlesex County, PK–12)
- Ware School Department (Hampshire County, PK–12)
- Wareham School Department (Plymouth County, PK–12)
- Watertown Public Schools (Middlesex County, PK–12)
- Wayland School Department (Middlesex County, PK–12)
- Webster School Department (Worcester County, PK–12)
- Wellesley School Department (Norfolk County, PK–12)
- Wellfleet School Department (Barnstable County, K–5)
- West Boylston School Department (Worcester County, PK–12)
- West Bridgewater School Department (Plymouth County, PK–12)
- West Springfield School Department (Hampden County, PK–12)
- Westborough School Department (Worcester County, PK–12)
- Westfield School Department (Hampden County, PK–12)
- Westford School Department (Middlesex County, PK–12)
- Westhampton School Department (Hampshire County, PK–6)
- Weston School Department (Middlesex County, PK–12)
- Westport School Department (Bristol County, PK–12)
- Westwood School Department (Norfolk County, PK–12)
- Weymouth School Department (Norfolk County, PK–12; also serves SouthField through a grade tuition agreement)
- Whately School Department (Franklin County, PK–6)
- Williamsburg School Department (Hampshire County, PK–6)
- Wilmington School Department (Middlesex County, PK–12)
- Winchendon School Department (Worcester County, PK–12)
- Winchester School Department (Middlesex County, PK–12)
- Winthrop School Department (Suffolk County, PK–12)
- Woburn School Department (Middlesex County, PK–12)
- Worcester School Department (Worcester County, PK–12)
- Worthington School Department (Hampshire County, PK–6)
- Wrentham School Department (Norfolk County, PK–6)

== Regional academic school districts ==
=== A ===
- Acton-Boxborough Regional School District (Middlesex County, PK–12, serving Acton and Boxborough)
- Amherst-Pelham Regional School District (Franklin and Hampshire Counties, 7–12, serving Amherst, Leverett, Pelham and Shutesbury)
- Ashburnham-Westminster Regional School District (Worcester County, PK–12, serving Ashburnham and Westminster)
- Athol-Royalston Regional School District (Worcester County, PK–12, serving Athol and Royalston)
- Ayer-Shirley Regional School District (Middlesex County, PK–12, serving Ayer and Shirley; also serving Devens through a grade tuition agreement)

=== B ===
- Berkshire Hills Regional School District (Berkshire County, PK–12, serving Great Barrington, Stockbridge and West Stockbridge; also serving grades 7–12 from Farmington River Regional through a grade tuition agreement)
- Berlin-Boylston Regional School District (Worcester County, PK–12, serving Berlin and Boylston)
- Blackstone-Millville Regional School District (Worcester County, PK–12, serving Blackstone and Millville)
- Bridgewater-Raynham Regional School District (Bristol and Plymouth Counties, PK–12, serving Bridgewater and Raynham)

=== C ===
- Central Berkshire Regional School District (Berkshire and Hampshire Counties, PK–12, serving Becket, Cummington, Dalton, Hinsdale, Peru, Washington and Windsor)
- Chesterfield-Goshen Regional School District (Hampshire county, PK–6, serving Chesterfield and Goshen)
- Concord-Carlisle Regional School District (Middlesex County, 9–12, serving Carlisle and Concord)

=== D ===
- Dennis-Yarmouth Regional School District (Barnstable County, PK–12, serving Dennis and Yarmouth)
- Dighton-Rehoboth Regional School District (Bristol County, PK–12, serving Dighton and Rehoboth)
- Dover-Sherborn Regional School District (Middlesex and Norfolk Counties, 6–12, serving Dover and Sherborn)
- Dudley-Charlton Regional School District (Worcester County, PK–12, serving Charlton and Dudley)

=== F ===
- Farmington River Regional School District (Berkshire County, PK–6, serving Otis and Sandisfield)
- Freetown & Lakeville Public Schools (Bristol and Plymouth Counties, PK–12, serving Freetown and Lakeville)
- Frontier Regional School District (Franklin County, 7–12, serving Conway, Deerfield, Sunderland and Whately)

=== G ===
- Gateway Regional School District (Hampden and Hampshire Counties, PK–12, serving Blandford, Chester, Huntington, Middlefield, Montgomery and Russell; also serving Worthington (7–12) through a grade tuition agreement)
- Gill-Montague Regional School District (Franklin County, PK–12, serving Gill and Montague; also serving Erving (7–12) through a grade tuition agreement)
- Groton-Dunstable Regional School District (Middlesex County, PK–12, serving Dunstable and Groton)

=== H ===
- Hamilton-Wenham Regional School District (Essex County, PK–12, serving Hamilton and Wenham)
- Hampden-Wilbraham Regional School District (Hampden County, PK–12, serving Hampden and Wilbraham)
- Hampshire Regional School District (Hampshire County, 7–12, serving Chesterfield, Goshen, Southampton, Westhampton and Williamsburg)
- Hawlemont Regional School District (Franklin County, PK–6, serving Charlemont and Hawley)
- Hoosac Valley Regional School District (Berkshire County, PK–12, serving Adams and Cheshire; also serving Savoy (7–12) through a grade tuition agreement)

=== K ===
- King Philip Regional School District (Norfolk County, 7–12, serving Norfolk, Plainville and Wrentham)

=== L ===
- Lincoln-Sudbury Regional School District (Middlesex County, 9–12, serving Lincoln and Sudbury)

=== M ===
- Manchester-Essex Regional School District (Essex County, PK–12, serving Essex and Manchester)
- Martha's Vineyard Regional School District (Dukes County, 9–12, serving Aquinnah, Chilmark, Edgartown, Oak Bluffs, Tisbury and West Tisbury)
- Masconomet Regional School District (Essex County, 7–12, serving Boxford, Middleton and Topsfield)
- Mendon-Upton Regional School District (Worcester County, PK–12, serving Mendon and Upton)
- Mohawk Trail Regional School District (Franklin and Hampshire Counties, PK–12, serving Ashfield, Buckland, Charlemont (7–12), Colrain, Hawley (7–12), Heath, Plainfield, and Shelburne; also serving Rowe (7–12) through a grade tuition agreement)
- Monomoy Regional School District (Barnstable County, PK–12, serving Chatham and Harwich, Massachusetts)
- Mount Greylock Regional School District (Berkshire County, PK–12, serving Lanesborough and Williamstown; also serving Hancock (7–12) and New Ashford (PK–6 at Lanesborough Elementary School and 7–12 at Mount Greylock Regional High School) through grade tuition agreements)

=== N ===
- Narragansett Regional School District (Worcester County, PK–12, serving Phillipston and Templeton)
- Nashoba Regional School District (Middlesex and Worcester Counties, PK–12, serving Bolton, Lancaster and Stow)
- Nauset Public Schools (Barnstable County, 6–12, serving Brewster, Eastham, Orleans and Wellfleet; also serving Provincetown (9–12) and Truro (7–12) through grade tuition agreements)
- New Salem-Wendell Regional School District (Franklin County, PK–6, serving New Salem and Wendell)
- North Middlesex Regional School District (Middlesex County, PK–12, serving Ashby, Pepperell and Townsend)
- Northborough-Southborough Regional School District (Worcester County, 9–12, serving Northborough and Southborough)

=== O ===
- Old Rochester Regional School District (Plymouth County, 7–12, serving Marion, Mattapoisett and Rochester)

=== P ===
- Pentucket Regional School District (Essex County, PK–12, serving Groveland, Merrimac and West Newbury)
- Pioneer Valley Regional School District (Franklin County, PK–12, serving Bernardston, Leyden, Northfield and Warwick)

=== Q ===
- Quabbin Regional School District (Worcester County, PK–12, serving Barre, Hardwick, Hubbardston, New Braintree and Oakham)
- Quaboag Regional School District (Worcester County, PK–12, serving Warren and West Brookfield)

=== R ===
- Ralph C. Mahar Regional School District (Franklin and Worcester Counties, 7–12, serving New Salem, Orange, Petersham and Wendell)

=== S ===
- Silver Lake Regional School District (Plymouth County, PK and 7–12, serving Halifax, Kingston and Plympton)
- Somerset-Berkley Regional School District (Bristol County, 9–12, serving Berkley and Somerset)
- Southern Berkshire Regional School District (Berkshire County, PK–12, serving Alford, Egremont, Monterey, New Marlborough and Sheffield; also serving Mount Washington through a grade tuition agreement)
- Southwick-Tolland-Granville Regional School District (Hampden County, PK–12, serving Granville, Southwick and Tolland)
- Spencer-East Brookfield Regional School District (Worcester County, PK–12, serving East Brookfield and Spencer)

=== T ===
- Tantasqua Regional School District (Hampden and Worcester Counties, 7–12, serving Brimfield, Brookfield, Holland, Sturbridge and Wales)
- Triton Regional School District (Essex County, PK–12, serving Newbury, Rowley and Salisbury)

=== U ===
- Up-Island Regional School District (Dukes County, PK–8, serving Aquinnah, Chilmark and West Tisbury)

=== W ===
- Wachusett Regional School District (Worcester County, PK–12, serving Holden, Paxton, Princeton, Rutland and Sterling)
- Whitman-Hanson Regional School District (Plymouth County, PK–12, serving Hanson and Whitman)

== Regional vocational-technical school districts ==
=== A ===
- Assabet Valley Regional Vocational Technical School District (Middlesex and Worcester Counties, 9–12, serving Berlin, Hudson, Marlborough, Maynard, Northborough, Southborough, and Westborough)

=== B ===
- Blackstone Valley Regional Vocational Technical High School (Norfolk and Worcester Counties, 9–12, serving Bellingham, Blackstone, Douglas, Grafton, Hopedale, Mendon, Milford, Millbury, Millville, Northbridge, Sutton, Upton, and Uxbridge)
- Blue Hills Regional Vocational Technical School District (Norfolk County, 9–12, serving Avon, Braintree, Canton, Dedham, Holbrook, Milton, Norwood, Randolph, Westwood)
- Bristol-Plymouth Regional Technical School (Bristol and Plymouth Counties, 9–12, serving Berkley, Bridgewater, Dighton, Middleborough, Raynham, Rehoboth and Taunton)

=== C ===
- Cape Cod Regional Technical High School (Barnstable County, 9–12, serving Barnstable, Brewster, Chatham, Dennis, Eastham, Harwich, Mashpee, Orleans, Provincetown, Truro, Wellfleet and Yarmouth)

=== E ===
- Essex North Shore Agricultural and Technical School District (Essex County, 9–12, serving Beverly, Boxford, Danvers, Essex, Gloucester, Hamilton, Lynnfield, Manchester, Marblehead, Middleton, Nahant, Peabody, Rockport, Salem, Swampscott, Topsfield and Wenham)

=== F ===
- Franklin County Regional Vocational Technical School (Franklin County, 9–12, serving Bernardston, Buckland, Colrain, Conway, Deerfield, Erving, Gill, Greenfield, Heath, Leyden, Montague, New Salem, Northfield, Orange, Shelburne, Sunderland, Warwick, Wendell and Whately; also serving Rowe through a grade tuition agreement)

=== G ===
- Greater Fall River Regional Vocational Technical District (Bristol County, 9–12, serving Fall River, Somerset, Swansea and Westport)
- Greater Lawrence Technical School (Essex County, 9–12, serving Andover, Lawrence, Methuen and North Andover)
- Greater Lowell Technical High School (Middlesex County, 9–12, serving Dracut, Dunstable, Lowell and Tyngsborough)
- Greater New Bedford Regional Vocational-Technical High School (Bristol County, 9–12, serving Dartmouth, Fairhaven and New Bedford)

=== M ===
- Minuteman Career and Technical High School (Middlesex, Norfolk and Worcester Counties, 9–12, serving Acton, Arlington, Belmont, Bolton, Concord, Dover, Lancaster, Lexington, Needham and Stow)
- Montachusett Regional Vocational Technical School (Middlesex and Worcester Counties, 9–12, serving Ashburnham, Ashby, Athol, Barre, Fitchburg, Gardner, Harvard, Holden, Hubbardston, Lunenburg, Petersham, Phillipston, Princeton, Royalston, Sterling, Templeton, Westminster and Winchendon)

=== N ===
- Nashoba Valley Technical School District (Middlesex County, 9–12, serving Ayer, Chelmsford, Groton, Littleton, Pepperell, Shirley, Townsend and Westford)
- Northeast Metropolitan Regional Vocational High School (Essex, Middlesex and Suffolk Counties, 9–12, serving Chelsea, Malden, Melrose, North Reading, Reading, Revere, Saugus, Stoneham, Wakefield, Winchester, Winthrop and Woburn)
- Northern Berkshire Vocational Regional School District (Berkshire and Franklin Counties, 9–12, serving Adams, Cheshire, Clarksburg, Florida, Lanesboro, Monroe, North Adams, Savoy and Williamstown)

=== O ===
- Old Colony Regional Vocational Technical High School (Bristol and Plymouth Counties, 9–12, serving Acushnet, Carver, Lakeville, Mattapoisett and Rochester) Note: Freetown and Lakeville share a district and Freetown is not a member town and students from Freetown are limited to about 90.

=== P ===
- Pathfinder Regional Technical High School (Hampden, Hampshire and Worcester Counties, 9–12, serving Belchertown, Granby, Hardwick, Monson, New Braintree, Oakham, Palmer, Ware and Warren)

=== S ===
- Shawsheen Valley Technical High School (Middlesex County, 9–12, serving Bedford, Billerica, Burlington, Tewksbury and Wilmington)
- South Middlesex Regional Vocational Technical School District (Middlesex County, 9–12, serving Ashland, Framingham, Holliston, Hopkinton and Natick)
- South Shore Vocational Technical High School (Norfolk and Plymouth Counties, 9–12, serving Abington, Cohasset, Hanover, Hanson, Norwell, Rockland, Scituate and Whitman)
- Southeastern Regional Vocational Technical High School (Bristol, Norfolk and Plymouth Counties, 9–12, serving Brockton, East Bridgewater, Easton, Foxborough, Mansfield, Norton, Sharon, Stoughton and West Bridgewater)
- Southern Worcester County Regional Vocational Technical District (Worcester County, 9–12, serving Auburn, Charlton, Dudley, North Brookfield, Oxford, Paxton, Rutland, Southbridge, Spencer and Webster)

=== T ===
- Tri-County Regional Vocational Technical High School (Bristol, Middlesex and Norfolk Counties, 9–12, serving Franklin, Medfield, Medway, Millis, Norfolk, North Attleborough, Plainville, Seekonk, Sherborn, Walpole and Wrentham)

=== U ===
- Upper Cape Cod Regional Technical School (Barnstable and Plymouth Counties, 9–12, serving Bourne, Falmouth, Marion, Sandwich and Wareham)

=== W ===
- Whittier Regional Vocational Technical High School (Essex County, 9–12, serving Amesbury, Georgetown, Groveland, Haverhill, Ipswich, Merrimac, Newbury, Newburyport, Rowley, Salisbury and West Newbury)

== Independent vocational ==
=== N ===
- Northampton-Smith Vocational Agricultural High School (Hampshire County, 9–12, serving Northampton)

== County agricultural school districts ==
=== B ===
- Bristol County Agricultural High School (Bristol County, 9–12, serving Acushnet, Attleboro, Berkley, Dartmouth, Dighton, Easton, Fairhaven, Fall River, Freetown, Mansfield, New Bedford, North Attleborough, Norton, Raynham, Rehoboth, Seekonk, Somerset, Swansea, Taunton and Westport)

=== N ===
- Norfolk County Agricultural High School (Norfolk County, 9–12, serving Avon, Bellingham, Braintree, Brookline, Canton, Cohasset, Dedham, Dover, Foxborough, Franklin, Holbrook, Medfield, Medway, Millis, Milton, Needham, Norfolk, Norwood, Plainville, Quincy, Randolph, Sharon, Stoughton, Walpole, Wellesley, Westwood, Weymouth and Wrentham)

== Charter school districts ==
Following the Education Reform Act of 1993, the state Department of Education authorized two types of "charter" schools, public schools outside the control of any school committee. Commonwealth Charter Schools (marked on this list with the letters "CC") are funded through money deducted by the state from its aid payments to the school districts that would otherwise be responsible for the school's students; Horace Mann Charter Schools (marked "HM") are founded with the permission of the school districts in which they are physically located, and funded by their "parent" district.

=== A ===
- Abby Kelley Foster Charter Public School District (CC, Worcester, K–12, serving the Auburn, Leicester, Millbury, Oxford, Shrewsbury, Sutton, Wachusett, West Boylston and Worcester school districts)
- Academy of the Pacific Rim Charter Public School District (CC, Hyde Park section of Boston, 5–12, serving the Boston school district)
- Advanced Math and Science Academy Charter School District (CC, Marlborough, 6–12, serving the Clinton, Hudson, Marlborough and Maynard school districts)
- Alma del Mar Charter School District (CC, New Bedford, K–8, serving the New Bedford school district)
- Argosy Collegiate Charter School District (CC, Fall River, 6–12, serving the Fall River school district)
- Atlantis Charter School District (CC, Fall River, K–12, serving the Fall River school district)

=== B ===
- Baystate Academy Charter Public School District (CC, Springfield, 6–12, serving the Springfield school district)
- Benjamin Banneker Charter Public School District (CC, Cambridge, K–6, serving the Boston and Cambridge school districts)
- Benjamin Franklin Classical Public Charter School District (CC, Franklin, K–8, serving the Bellingham, Blackstone-Millville, Franklin, Holliston, Hopedale, Medway, Mendon-Upton, Milford, Millis, Norfolk, Plainville, Walpole and Wrentham school districts)
- Berkshire Arts and Technology Charter Public School District (CC, Adams, 6–12, serving the Clarksburg, Florida, Hancock, Hoosac Valley Regional, Mount Greylock, North Adams, Pittsfield and Savoy school districts)
- Boston Collegiate Charter School District (CC, Dorchester section of Boston, 5–12, serving the Boston school district)
- Boston Day and Evening Academy Charter School District (HM, Roxbury section of Boston, 9–12, serving the Boston school district)
- Boston Green Academy Horace Mann Charter School District (HM, Brighton section of Boston, 6–12, serving the Boston school district)
- Boston Preparatory Charter Public School District (CC, Hyde Park section of Boston, 6–12, serving the Boston school district)
- Boston Renaissance Charter Public School District (CC, Hyde Park section of Boston, PK–6, serving the Boston school district)
- Bridge Boston Charter School District (CC, Roxbury section of Boston, PK–8, serving the Boston school district)
- Brooke Charter School District (CC, Roslindale section of Boston, K–12, serving the Boston school district)

=== C ===
- Cape Cod Lighthouse Charter School District (CC, Orleans, 6–8, serving the Barnstable, Bourne, Dennis-Yarmouth, Falmouth, Mashpee, Monomoy Regional, Nauset, Provincetown, Sandwich and Truro school districts)
- Christa McAuliffe Regional Charter Public School District (CC, Framingham, 6–8, serving the Ashland, Framingham, Holliston, Hopedale, Marlborough, Natick, Southborough and Sudbury school districts)
- City on a Hill Charter Public School District (CC, Roxbury section of Boston, 9–12, serving the Boston school district)
- Codman Academy Charter Public School District (CC, Dorchester section of Boston, PK–12, serving the Boston school district)
- Collegiate Charter School of Lowell District (CC, Lowell, K–11, serving the Lowell school district)
- Community Charter School of Cambridge School District (CC, Cambridge, 6–12, serving the Boston and Cambridge school districts)
- Community Day Charter Public School District - Gateway (CC, Lawrence, PK–8, serving the Lawrence school district)
- Community Day Charter Public School District - Prospect (CC, Lawrence, PK–8, serving the Lawrence school district)
- Community Day Charter Public School District - R. Kingman Webster (CC, Lawrence, PK–8, serving the Lawrence school district)
- Conservatory Lab Charter School District (CC, Brighton section of Boston, PK–8, serving the Boston school district)

=== D ===
- Dudley Street Neighborhood Charter School District (HM, Boston, PK–5, serving the Boston school district)

=== E ===
- Edward M. Kennedy Academy for Health Careers Horace Mann Charter District (HM, Boston, 9–12, serving the Boston school district)
- Excel Academy Charter School District (CC, East Boston section of Boston, 5–12, serving the Boston and Chelsea school districts)

=== F ===
- Four Rivers Charter Public School District (CC, Greenfield, 7–12, serving the Frontier, Gill-Montague, Greenfield, Mohawk Trail, Pioneer Valley and Ralph C. Mahar school districts)
- Foxborough Regional Charter School District (CC, Foxborough, K–12, serving the Attleboro, Avon, Brockton, Canton, Easton, Foxborough, Mansfield, Medfield, Medway, Millis, Norfolk, North Attleborough, Norton, Norwood, Plainville, Sharon, Stoughton, Walpole, West Bridgewater and Wrentham school districts)
- Francis W. Parker Charter Essential School District (CC, Devens section of Ayer, 7–12, serving the Acton-Boxborough, Ashburnham-Westminster, Athol-Royalston, Ayer-Shirley, Bedford, Berlin-Boylston, Carlisle, Chelmsford, Clinton, Concord, Concord-Carlisle, Fitchburg, Gardner, Grafton, Groton-Dunstable, Harvard, Hudson, Leominster, Lincoln, Lincoln-Sudbury, Littleton, Lowell, Lunenburg, Marlborough, Maynard, Naragansett, Nashoba, Newtown, North Middlesex, Northborough-Southborough, Orange, Oxford, Quabbin, Ralph C. Mahar, Shrewsbury, Southborough, Sudbury, Tyngsborough, Wachusett, Wayland, Westborough, Westford, Weston, Winchester and Worcester school districts)

=== G ===
- Global Learning Charter Public District (CC, New Bedford, 5–12, serving the New Bedford school district)

=== H ===
- Hampden Charter School of Science East District (CC, Chicopee, 6–12, serving the Chicopee, Ludlow, Springfield and West Springfield school districts)
- Hampden Charter School of Science West District (CC, West Springfield, 6–12, serving the Agawam, Holyoke, West Springfield and Westfield school districts)
- Helen Y. Davis Leadership Academy Charter Public District (CC, Boston, 6–8, serving the Boston school district)
- Hill View Montessori Charter Public School District (CC, Haverhill, K–8, serving the Haverhill school district)
- Hilltown Cooperative Charter Public School District (CC, Haydenville section of Williamsburg, K–8, serving the Amherst, Amherst-Pelham, Belchertown, Central Berkshire, Chesterfield-Goshen, Conway, Deerfield, Easthampton, Erving, Frontier, Gateway, Gill-Montague, Granby, Greenfield, Hadley, Hampshire, Hatfield, Hawlemont, Leverett, Mohawk Trail, New Salem-Wendell, Northampton, Orange, Pelham, Pioneer Valley, Ralph C. Mahar, Rowe, Shutesbury, South Hadley, Southampton, Sunderland, Ware, Westhampton, Whately and Williamsburg school districts)
- Holyoke Community Public (CC, Holyoke, K–8, serving the Holyoke school district)

=== I ===
- Innovation Academy Public School District (CC, Chelmsford, 5–12, serving the Billerica, Chelmsford, Dracut, Groton-Dunstable, Littleton, Lowell, Tewksbury, Tyngsborough and Westford school districts)

=== K ===
- KIPP Academy Boston Public School District (CC, Boston, K–8, serving the Boston school district)
- KIPP Academy Lynn Public School District (CC, Lynn, K–12, serving the Lynn school district)

=== L ===
- Lawrence Family Development Public School District (CC, Lawrence, PK–8, serving the Lawrence school district)
- Learning First Charter Public School District (CC, Worcester, K–8, serving the Worcester school district)
- Libertas Academy Charter School District (CC, Springfield, 6–9, serving the Springfield school district)
- Lowell Community Charter Public School District (CC, Lowell, PK–8, serving the Lowell school district)
- Lowell Middlesex Academy Public School District (CC, Lowell, 9–12, serving the Lowell school district)

=== M ===
- MATCH Charter Public School District (CC, Boston, PK–12, serving the Boston school district)
- Map Academy Charter School District (CC, Plymouth, 9–12, serving the Carver, Plymouth and Wareham school districts)
- Marblehead Community Public School District (CC, Marblehead, 4–8, serving the Marblehead school district)
- Martha's Vineyard Public School District (CC, West Tisbury, K–12, serving the Edgartown, Martha's Vineyard, Oak Bluffs, Tisbury and Up-Island Regional school districts)
- Martin Luther King Jr. Charter School of Excellence School District (CC, Springfield, K–5, serving the Springfield school district)
- Mystic Valley Regional Public School District (CC, Malden, K–12, serving the Everett, Malden, Medford, Melrose, Stoneham and Wakefield school districts)

=== N ===
- Neighborhood House Public School District (CC, Dorchester section of Boston, PK–12, serving the Boston school district)
- New Heights Charter School of Brockton District (CC, Brockton, 6–12, serving the Brockton, Randolph, Taunton school districts)

=== O ===
- Old Sturbridge Academy Charter Public School District (CC, Sturbridge, K–7, serving the Brimfield, Brookfield, Holland, Monson, North Brookfield, Palmer, Southbridge, Spencer-East Brookfield, Sturbridge, Tantasqua, Wales and Webster school districts)

=== P ===
- Paulo Freire Social Justice Charter School District (CC, Chicopee, 9–12, serving the Chicopee, Holyoke, Northampton, South Hadley, West Springfield and Westfield school districts)
- Phoenix Academy Public Charter High School Lawrence District (CC, Lawrence, 9–12, serving the Haverhill, Lawrence and Methuen school districts)
- Phoenix Academy Public Charter High School Springfield District (CC, Springfield, 9–12, serving the Chicopee, Holyoke and Springfield school districts)
- Phoenix Charter Academy School District (CC, Chelsea, 9–12, serving the Chelsea, Everett, Lynn and Revere school districts)
- Pioneer Charter School of Science School District (CC, Revere, K–12, serving the Chelsea, Everett and Revere school districts)
- Pioneer Charter School of Science II District (CC, Saugus, 7–12, serving the Danvers, Lynn, Peabody, Salem and Saugus school districts)
- Pioneer Valley Chinese Immersion Charter School (CC, Hadley, K–12, serving the Agawam, Amherst, Amherst-Pelham, Belchertown, Chesterfield-Goshen, Chicopee, Conway, Deerfield, East Longmeadow, Easthampton, Frontier, Gill-Montague, Granby, Greenfield, Hadley, Hampden-Wilbraham, Hampshire, Hatfield, Hawlemont, Holyoke, Leverett, Longmeadow, Ludlow, Mohawk Trail, Northampton, Pelham, Pioneer Valley, Shutesbury, South Hadley, Southampton, Southwick-Tolland-Granville Regional, Springfield, Sunderland, West Springfield, Westfield, Westhampton, Whately and Williamsburg school districts)
- Pioneer Valley Performing Arts Charter Public School District (CC, South Hadley, 7–12, serving the Agawam, Amherst, Amherst-Pelham, Belchertown, Brimfield, Brookfield, Chesterfield-Goshen, Chicopee, Conway, East Longmeadow, East Hampton, Gateway, Gill-Montague, Granby, Greenfield, Hadley, Hampden-Wilbraham, Hampshire, Hatfield, Holyoke, Leverett, Longmeadow, Ludlow, Mohawk Trail, Monson, New Salem-Wendell, Northampton, Palmer, Pelham, Petersham, Pioneer Valley, Quabbin, Quaboag Regional, Ralph C. Mahar, Savoy, Shutesbury, South Hadley, Southampton, Southwick-Tolland-Granville Regional, Springfield, Sturbridge, Sunderland, Wales, Ware, West Springfield, Westfield, Westhampton, Whately and Williamsburg school districts)
- Prospect Hill Academy Public School District (CC, Somerville, PK–12, serving the Cambridge and Somerville school districts)

=== R ===
- Rising Tide Public School District (CC, Plymouth, 5–12, serving the Plymouth school district)
- River Valley Public School District (CC, Newburyport, K–8, serving the Amesbury, Newburyport, Pentucket and Triton school districts)
- Roxbury Preparatory Public School District (CC, Roxbury section of Boston, 5–12, serving the Boston school districts)

=== S ===
- Salem Academy Public School District (CC, Salem, 6–12, serving the Salem school district)
- Sizer School: A North Central Charter Essential District (CC, Fitchburg, 7–12, serving the Ashburnham-Westminster, Clinton, Fitchburg, Gardner, Leominster, Lunenburg, Nashoba, North Middlesex and Wachusett school districts)
- South Shore Charter Public School District (CC, Norwell, K–12, serving the Abington, Braintree, Brockton, Cohasset, Duxbury, East Bridgewater, Halifax, Hanover, Hingham, Holbrook, Hull, Kingston, Marshfield, Norwell, Pembroke, Plymouth, Plympton, Quincy, Randolph, Rockland, Scituate, Weymouth and Whitman-Hanson school districts)
- Springfield International Charter District (CC, Springfield, K–12, serving the Springfield school district)
- Springfield Preparatory Charter School District (CC, Springfield, K–7, serving the Springfield school district)
- Sturgis Charter Public School District (CC, Hyannis section of Barnstable, 9–12, serving the Barnstable, Bourne, Carver, Dennis-Yarmouth, Falmouth, Mashpee, Monomoy Regional, Nauset, Plymouth, Provincetown, Sandwich and Wareham school districts)

=== U ===
- UP Academy Charter School of Boston District (HM, Boston, 6–8, serving the Boston school district)
- UP Academy Charter School of Dorchester District (HM, South Boston section of Boston, PK–8, serving the Boston school district)

=== V ===
- Veritas Preparatory Charter School District (CC, Springfield, 5–8, serving the Springfield school district)

== Independent public ==
=== M ===
- Massachusetts Academy of Math and Science at WPI (Essex, Hampden, Middlesex, Norfolk and Worcester Counties, 11–12, serving Andover, Ashburnham, Auburn, Barre, Berlin, Blackstone, Bolton, Boxborough, Boylston, Charlton, Chelmsford, Concord, Dudley, Foxborough, Framingham, Franklin, Grafton, Harvard, Haverhill, Holden, Holliston, Hopedale, Hopkinton, Hubbardston, Hudson, Leominster, Lexington, Lunenburg, Marlborough, Maynard, Medway, Milford, Millbury, Newton, Northborough, Northbridge, Oakham, Oxford, Petersham, Rutland, Sherborn, Shrewsbury, Southborough, Southbridge, Spencer, Sterling, Stow, Sturbridge, Sudbury, Sutton, Upton, Uxbridge, Waltham, Webster, West Brookfield, Westborough, Westford, Westminster, Weston, Wilbraham and Worcester)

== Commonwealth virtual ==
=== G ===
- Greater Commonwealth Virtual District (K–12)

=== T ===
- TEC Connections Academy Commonwealth Virtual School District (K–12)

== Bureau Of Institutional Schools ==
=== I ===
- Institutional Schools (1–12)

== Superintendency unions ==
Each superintendency union serves multiple school districts with the same superintendent.

- Superintendency Union 3 (serving the Northborough, Northborough-Southborough and Southborough school districts)
- Superintendency Union 19 (serving the Edgartown, Martha's Vineyard, Oak Bluffs, Tisbury and Up-Island school districts)
- Superintendency Union 26 (serving the Amherst, Amherst-Pelham and Pelham school districts)
- Superintendency Union 28 (serving the Erving, Leverett, New Salem-Wendell and Shutesbury school districts)
- Superintendency Union 31 (serving the Halifax, Kingston, Plympton and Silver Lake School Districts)
- Superintendency Union 38 (serving the Conway, Deerfield, Frontier, Sunderland and Whately school districts)
- Superintendency Union 43 (serving the Clarksburg, Florida, Rowe and Savoy school districts)
- Superintendency Union 50 (serving the Dover, Dover-Sherborn and Dover Sherborn school districts)
- Superintendency Union 54 (serving the Brewster, Eastham, Nauset, Orleans and Wellfleet school districts)
- Superintendency Union 55 (serving the Marion, Mattapoisett, Old Rochester and Rochester school districts)
- Superintendency Union 58 (serving the Boxford, Middleton and Topsfield school districts)
- Superintendency Union 61 (serving the Brimfield, Brookfield, Holland, Sturbridge, Tantasqua and Wales school districts)
- Superintendency Union 66 (serving the Chesterfield-Goshen, Hampshire, Southampton, Westhampton, Williamsburg and Worthington school districts)
- Superintendency Union 70 (serving the Hancock and Richmond school districts)
- Superintendency Union 73 (serving the Orange, Petersham and Ralph C. Mahar school districts)

== See also ==
- Education in Massachusetts
