= Denis Delaney =

Denis Delaney may refer to:

- Dinny Delaney (1841–1919), blind Irish piper
- Denis W. Delaney (1896–1968), American government official, civic leader, and entertainer
- Peter Green (historian) (1924–2024), English classical scholar and novelist, wrote Cat in Gloves under the pseudonym Denis Delaney

== See also ==
- Dennis Delaney (born 1953), American writer and actor
