= Southfield =

Southfield may refer to:

- Southfield, Jamaica
- Southfield, Massachusetts, village within the town of New Marlborough
- SouthField, Massachusetts (development), planned community near Boston
- Southfield, Michigan, a city
  - Southfield Township, Michigan, in Oakland County, as the city is
- Southfield, Staten Island, New York
- Southfield (ward), London, England

== See also ==
- South Field (disambiguation)
- Southfields (disambiguation)
- Southfield School (disambiguation)
