= Andover High School (Massachusetts) =

School in Andover, Massachusetts, United States

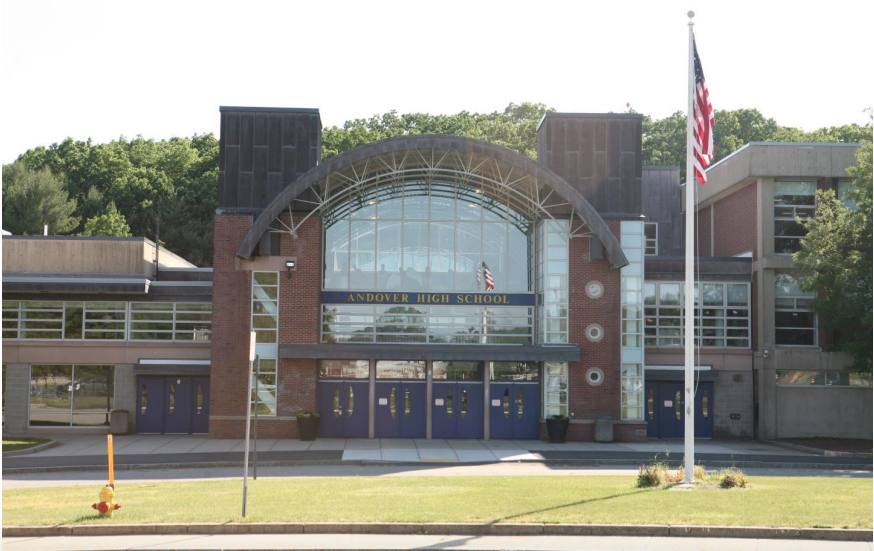
- Andover High School

Location
- 80 Shawsheen Road; Andover, Massachusetts 01810; United States; 42.6571°N 71.1551°W

Information
- School type: Public secondary school
- Opened: 1854 (As the Punchard Free School); 1968 (At current facility)
- School district: Andover Public Schools
- NCES District ID: 2501950
- Superintendent: Magda C. Parvey
- CEEB code: 220025
- NCES School ID: 250195000045
- Principal: James D’Andrea
- Grades: 9-12
- Gender: Coeducational
- Colors: Navy Blue and Gold
- Athletics conference: Merrimack Valley Conference (MVC)
- Mascot: Golden Warrior
- Team name: Andover Golden Warriors
- Newspaper: Andover View
- Communities served: Town of Andover
- Website: https://www.aps1.net/o/ahs

Andover High School (formerly Punchard High School, The School at Punchard, or Punchard Free School) is a secondary school in the town of Andover, Massachusetts, United States. It is the only public high school in the Andover Public School district. The school's administration is headed by Jimmy D'Andrea, the principal, and is overseen by Superintendent of Schools Magda Parvey.

== Campus ==
=== Overview ===
As of January 2025, The Andover High School campus comprises one central academic facility, housing several classrooms, "The fieldhouse" a gymnasium/stadium laboratories, health center and administrative offices. Connected to its northwest side is the J. Everett Collins Center for the Performing Arts, an auditorium that seats 1,203 people and is used for both school and town functions. To the southeast, two indoor athletic facilities abut the academic center (the Dunn Gymnasium and the Field House) alongside central locker rooms and athletic offices and storage. The school has a media center/library located in the center of the school and a cafeteria located toward the north-west side of the school, just south of the Collins Center.

=== Outdoor athletic fields ===
Andover's campus contains 4 fields (Northeast, Northwest, Southeast and Southwest) and 1 stadium for athletic use. The northeast and northwest fields are divided by the main artery roadway off of Shawsheen road. The northwest field contains 1 baseball diamond and dugouts respectively. The south-most portion of the northwest field contains a hill, disqualifying that portion of the field from most athletic uses, however, is commonly used for sledding in the winter seasons. The northeast and southeast fields are generally flat and each contain baseball and softball diamonds respectively. The southwest field is the smallest, by area, and is primarily used only by the physical education classes for outdoor activity.

Immediately northeast of the Dunn Gymnasium, there are accommodations for up to seven tennis matches.

The Eugene V. Lovely Memorial Field is Andover's outdoor football stadium. It was formerly used for the high school's commencement but was then abandoned due to size limitations as the school's population rose. The stadium is primarily used by Andover's football team, the Golden Warriors. In addition to bleachers and a turf field, there is a 400 meter track, and accommodations for field activities for track-and-field teams. Along the east side of the field, there are locker room facilities, along with a building used for the sales of concessions. The Eugene V. Lovely field is located to the far south of the school's campus, and abuts the parking lot off of Red Spring road.

=== Parking ===
The Andover High School campus facilitates parking and traffic patterns for students and faculty. To the far north, immediately adjacent to Shawsheen Road, a portion of the West Middle School parking lot is allocated for student parking. Additional student allocations include a lot immediately north of the tennis courts, along Moraine Street, and in the parking lot to the south of the Eugene V. Lovely field, abutting Red Spring Road. Faculty parking is accommodated in lots adjacent to the J. Everett Collins Center and to the south of the field house.

=== Andover Youth Services Skate Park ===
The Town Of Andover's Youth Services manages a skate park at the east side of the school's campus.

=== Andover TV ===
The local television station for Andover is run from the Andover High School. Andover TV specializes in recording and broadcasting events, meetings and informational content to keep Andover's community informed and connected. Originally used as a band room, the studio was modified in the mid 80’s to suit the need for local access television in Andover. Since the installation of the TV studio, it has been used to facilitate Andover High School television classes and volunteer productions for over 40 years. Andover TV can now be watched at Comcast: [public 8 - education 6 - government 22], Verizon: [public 47 - education 43 - government 45], or the A ndover TV website.

=== Plans for renovation ===
Since October 2018, the Andover School Committee has held sub-committee meetings regarding the state of facilities at the High School. Citing overcrowding and outdated facilities, the town sought monetary allocations from the Massachusetts School Building Authority (MSBA), however, have been repeatedly denied. Andover residents approved article 18 at the 2022 annual town meeting, which appropriated $1.5 million to infrastructure repairs at the high school. As of May 2022, discussions toward future renovations are ongoing.

== Student life ==
Andover High School offers a variety of activities for students.

Sports are also offered at Andover High School for both men and women. Offered year round, the sports vary from Track and Field to Swimming Diving Cheerleading Volleyball and Ultimate Frisbee. The teams compete in the Merrimack Valley Conference. The teams, whose mascot is a golden eagle, are styled as the Golden Warriors, Sometimes just known as warriors.

Performing arts programs, including a drama guild, show choir, other vocal ensembles, marching band and orchestra are facilitated in the J. Everett Collins Center for the Performing Arts.

=== November 2011 hazing incident ===
In November 2011, The Eagle-Tribune reported that police were investigating claims that two Andover High School basketball players were hazed by older team members. They reportedly were pressured to engage in a sexually charged game while at an athletic camp. In January 2012, it was reported that two students had been expelled over the incident and a further five were suspended. A grand jury was convened to determine if any of the students should be charged criminally.

== Demographics ==
According to Massachusetts Department of Elementary and Secondary Education annual statistics, for the 2020–2021 academic year, the demographic enrollment distributions for race, gender and grade level at Andover High School (Massachusetts) are as follows:

Total number of enrolled students: 1,756
Total number of full-time equivalent educators: 132.8
Therefore, the student to teacher ratio for this school is 13.2:1

Enrollment by Race/Ethnicity (2020–2021)
Race	Enrolled Pupils*	% of District
African American	46	2.6%
Asian	341	19.4%
Hispanic	126	7.2%
Native American	4	0.2%
White	1,198	68.2%
Native Hawaiian, Pacific Islander	0	0%
Multi-Race, Non-Hispanic	42	2.4%
Total	1,756	100%

* Approximate number of enrolled pupils is calculated based on total number of students in district, multiplied by reported percentage, and rounded to nearest whole student.

Enrollment by gender (2020–2021)
Gender	Enrolled pupils	Percentage
Female	937	53.36%
Male	816	46.47%
Non-binary	3	0.17%
Total	1,756	100%

Enrollment by Grade
Grade	Pupils Enrolled	Percentage
9	437	24.89%
10	437	24.89%
11	408	23.23%
12	446	25.4%
SP*	28	1.59%
Total	1,756	100%

* SP = Special Education Beyond Grade 12

== Notable alumni ==
- Michael Chiklis, actor
- Jay Leno, comedian and longtime host of NBC's The Tonight Show
- Arthur T. Demoulas, CEO of DeMoulas Market Basket
- Rob Oppenheim, professional golfer
- Briga Heelan, actress
- Martin Johnson (musician), former lead singer of Boys Like Girls
- Ryan Hanigan, professional baseball player
- Buddy Farnham, former New England Patriots wide receiver
- E. J. Perry (American football), former Brown Bears football, former quarterback for the Jacksonville Jaguars
- Jesse Gallagher, vocals, musician of Apollo Sunshine
- Sid Watson, former NFL player and hockey coach
- Jacob Bannon, musician and artist, vocalist in metalcore band Converge
- Joe Sirois, musician, drummer in the ska punk band The Mighty Mighty Bosstones
- Blanchard Ryan, actress
- Kara Hayward, actress best known for the movie Moonrise Kingdom
- Craig Luschenat, Boston Celtics assistant coach
- Chelsea Frei, actress
