= J. Everett Collins Center for the Performing Arts =

Public performance venue in Andover, Massachusetts

- Collins Center
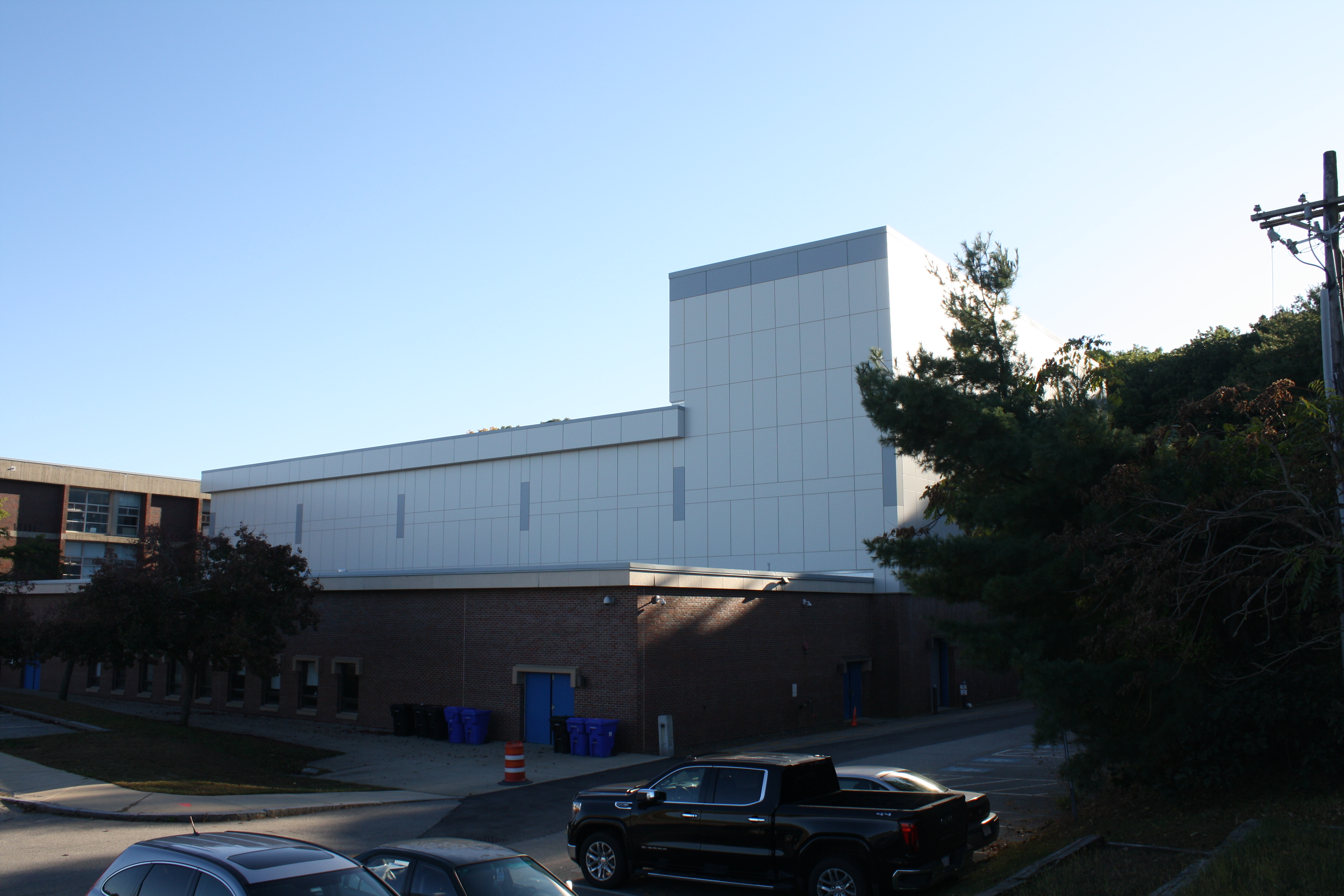
- Exterior image of building façade in late 2019.

- Location within Massachusetts Essex County
- Address: 100 Shawsheen Road; Andover, Massachusetts 01810
- Location: Andover, Massachusetts, U.S.
- Coordinates: 42.657966°N 71.156028°W
- Owner: The Town of Andover
- Operator: Scott Worthley
- Seating type: Proscenium
- Capacity: 1,203
- Type: Theatre

Construction
- Opened: September 25, 1983
- Cost: $4.1 million

Website
- Official website

The J. Everett Collins Center for the Performing Arts (also the Collins Center or J. Everett Collins Center) is a 1,203-seat, publicly owned theatre in Andover, Massachusetts. The Collins Center is annexed to Andover High School, and houses offices, facilities, and classrooms for the school's drama guild, vocal ensembles, orchestra, and band. The theatre was named after John Everett Collins, an Andover musician and politician.

== Construction ==
Approval for the addition of an auditorium onto the already existing high school campus was given in 1978 with town meeting warrant article 60 allocating $720,000 for such and other school improvement projects. By 1980, it was evident that additional funding was necessary for "constructing, originally equipping and furnishing an auditorium to the High School" and the town would allocate an additional $4,370,000 for the project that year Construction was completed in 1983 and the theatre would hold its inaugural performance on September 25 of that year. By the end of fiscal year 1983, $199.02 were unexpended from the 1978 allocation, as were $740,213.81 from the 1980 allocation, making the project $740,412.83 under budget.

== Technical specifications ==
=== Stage ===
The stage is constructed of black-painted Masonite, laid over four-inch plywood and set upon concrete. Between the proscenium, the stage is 84 feet wide, 32 feet deep from the plaster line to the upstage wall, 25 feet tall from the stage floor to the top of the proscenium and is raised 42 inches from the house floor. The stage right wing extends ten feet from the edge of the proscenium to the stage right wall. The stage left wing extends five feet from the edge of the proscenium to the fly rail. Both wings extend the full 32 feet depth of the stage. From the plaster line, the apron extends six feet downstage. This apron can be further extended using platforms in the orchestra pit.

=== Fly system ===
==== Rigging ====
There are a total of forty-four-line sets, including the fire curtain (autonomously controlled with building fire alarm system) and ten loaded and fixed pipes (five electrics, four orchestra panels and one movie projection screen). The forty-three executable line sets are T-track counterweight sets, operable from the stage left deck. Due to the location of a door on the stage left wall, ten sets are raised on a fly gallery and therefore double-purchased. All arbors are seven feet tall and can hold a maximum load of 1100 pounds.

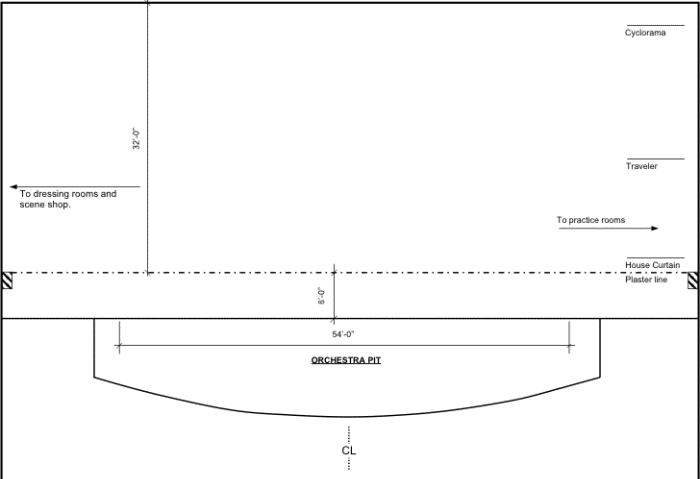
A diagram of the Collins Center stage and orchestra pit.

==== Soft goods ====
The house curtain and valance are blue velour; all other velour goods (one mid-stage traveler, two black drops and four sets of legs) are black. Stage inventory also includes various mylar drops, an off-white 50-foot wide cyclorama and a 40-foot-wide black scrim.

=== Electrical ===
Power can be tied in 15 feet off stage left to 400 amp three-phase alternating current via single pole connectors. Additional 20-amp circuits are located on both stage left and right decks. There are a total of 83 dimmers capable of 2.4 kW each that are controlled using the AMX protocol (or DMX via adapter). Each dimmer has its own 20-amp circuit, with tie-ins located throughout the theater.

=== Lighting ===
The Collins Center has 102 Source Four ellipsoidal fixtures of varying degrees, 60 PARs and PARNels, and four Altman cyclorama lights. Two additional 750 watt, 19-degree Source Fours are used for follow spots and are fixed on the front-of-house catwalk. These fixtures are conventional stage lighting, therefore manual focusing is necessary and color modification requires the use of gels. Stage lighting is controlled using the AMX protocol, however DMX may be used via an in-house converter.

Projection capability is possible either through front or rear projection onto a movie screen on batten 9, or onto the cyclorama using front projection.

=== Audio ===
The public address system consists of speakers located to the left, right and above the proscenium arch, controlled by a 32-channel audio mixing board between the left and right mezzanines in the house. A sixteen-send, four-return snake extends from the mixing board to the orchestra pit.

=== Orchestral ===
A 61-foot-wide orchestra pit curves out 12 feet into the house from the downstage end of the stage. This curves down along a 100-foot radius to 6 feet, 9 inches at the left and right ends. The height of platforms in the pit can be adjusted to be either: a) 18 inches below the house floor, b) level with the house floor, or c) raised to act as an apron extension at stage height. On the stage, 9' 9" wide floor panels can be arranged to create a 19-foot-tall orchestra shell. 4 additional flown sound panels complete an on-stage acoustic accommodation. The Collins Center also contains one 9-foot grand piano in its inventory.

== Notable performances ==
Date	Artist	Notes
September 25, 1983	Boston Pops Symphony Orchestra	Inaugural Performance
February 16, 1985	Dizzy Gillespie	... with quartet.
May 18, 1985	Judy Collins	
September 14, 1985	John Davidson	
October 5, 1985	New Black Eagle Jazz Band	Starring Carol Leigh
November 3, 1985	Borodin Trio	
November 13, 1985	David Copperfield	
November 23, 1985	Joffrey II Company	
February 3, 1986	National Tour of Brigadoon	
February 27, 1986	Flying Karamazov Brothers	
April 6, 1986	Connecticut Opera Company	Performing "Merry Widow"
April 10, 1986	Arlo Guthrie	
May 1, 1986	Itzhak Perlman	
May 9, 1986	Ballet Hispanico	
September 7, 1986	Rita Moreno	
October 26, 1986	Jerry Vale	
December 5–7, 1986	The Pittsburgh Ballet	Under the Direction of Patricia Wilde
April 1987	Joan Jett and the Blackhearts	Performing for Andover High School Students after winning WBCN radio contest
October 16, 1987	Al Martino & Anna Maria Alberghetti	Accompanied by a 20-piece orchestra Performing "A Romantic Evening of Love Songs"
October 6, 1989	Chuck Mangione	
December 1, 1998	U.S. Air Force Band	
December 15, 1998	Czech Radio Symphony Orchestra	Part of Northeast U.S. Tour
