= Lawrence High School (Massachusetts) =

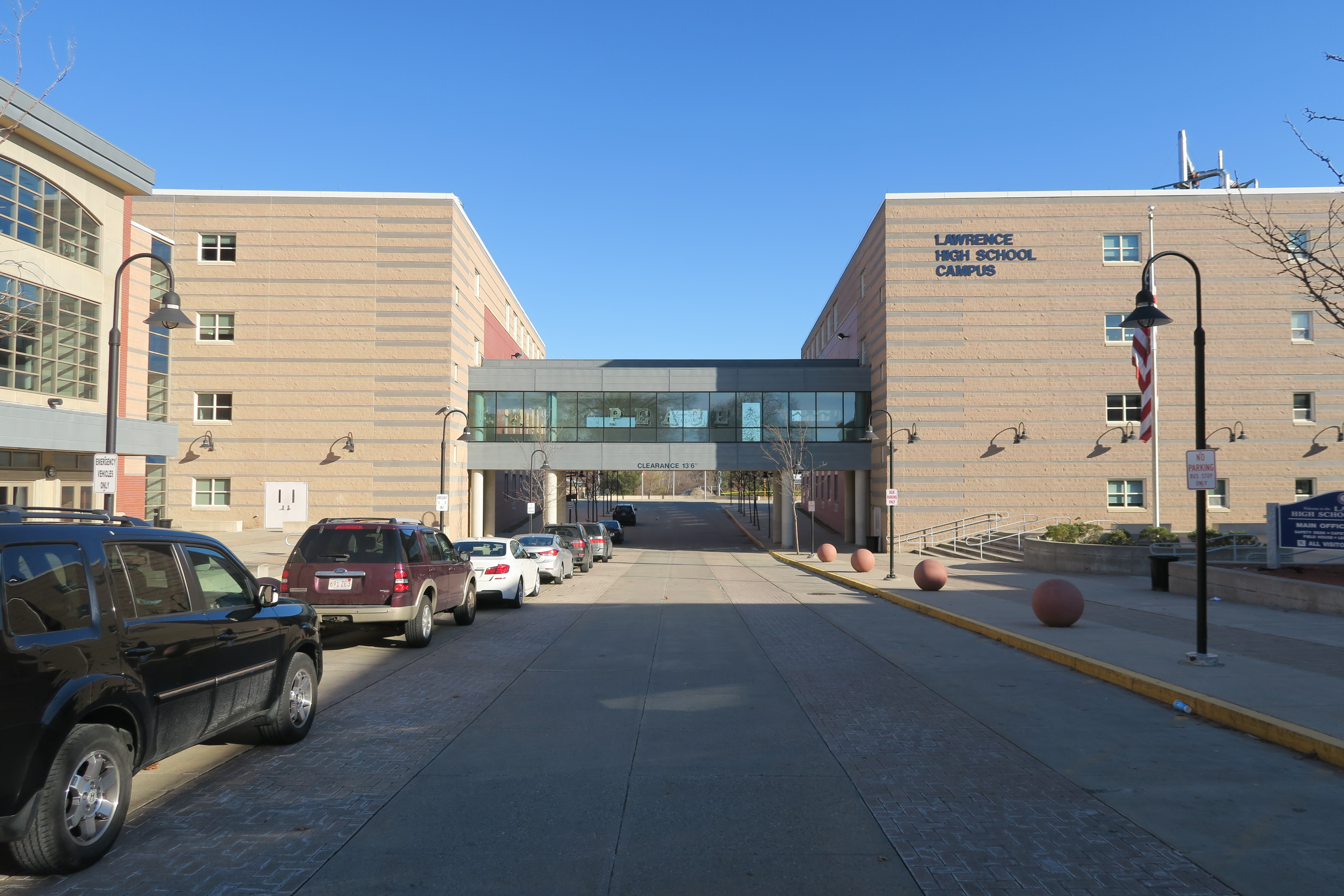

Location
- 70-71 North Parish Road; Lawrence, Massachusetts 01843; United States; 42.69074°N 71.14488°W

Information
- Type: Public High School
- School district: Lawrence Public Schools
- Superintendent: Cynthia Paris
- Principal: Jacob Carter
- Teaching staff: 253.20 (FTE)
- Grades: 9 - 12
- Enrollment: 3,453 (2024-2025)
- Student to teacher ratio: 13.64
- Campus size: 565,000 sq ft
- Colors: Navy and white
- Athletics conference: Merrimack Valley Conference (MVC)
- Nickname: Lancers
- Website: School website

Lawrence High School (abbreviated as LHS) is a public secondary school located in Lawrence, Massachusetts, United States. It is part of the Lawrence Public Schools. Its campus consists of several buildings that were completed in 2005.

== History ==
In 1901, the Lawrence High School was established at the corner of Lawrence and Haverhill street. This is where Lawrence High School served its many students for 106 years.

In 2007, a new Lawrence High School campus opened in south Lawrence. The original building houses an alternative high school program and a public middle school. The campus is organized into academies by grade level, with 9th and 10th graders being placed in separate "housed" academies, and an Upper School Academy which serves 11th and 12th graders. The campus used to house Abbott Lawrence Academy, which serves the highest-performing students, but no longer houses them since August 2025. The campus houses the LIFE program, which serves students with a disability. The new Lawrence High School campus is one of the largest in the state, with a field house that can seat 3,400 and a Performing Arts Center that seats an extra 1,200 individuals.

In 2010, the dropout rate at Lawrence High was over 25%. Due to poor academic performance, the school district was taken over by the state in 2011.

A program for recent immigrant students called Engaging Newcomers in Language and Content Education (ENLACE) Academy was established. The target demographic is students in the United States proper for two or fewer years each. Several students originated from Dominican Republic, Guatemala, Honduras, with Dominicans making up the largest demographic. Some students originated from Puerto Rico, a U.S. territory. As of 2024, the program is now known as UNIDOS.

== Academics ==
As of the 2024-2025 school year, the school requires a total of 113 credits to graduate. This includes four years of English, four years of mathematics, three lab-based years of science, one semester of health, and two semesters of physical education.

== Demographics ==
According to Massachusetts Department of Elementary and Secondary Education annual statistics, for the 2021–2022 academic year, the demographic enrollment distributions for race, gender and grade level at Lawrence High School (Massachusetts) are as follows:

Total number of enrolled students: 3,097
Total number of full-time equivalent educators: 246.4
Therefore, the student to teacher ratio for this school is 12.7∶1

Enrollment by Race/Ethnicity (2021–2022)
Race	Enrolled Pupils*	% of District
African American	46	1.5%
Asian	46	1.5%
Hispanic	2,908	93.9%
Native American	0	0.0%
White	81	2.6%
Native Hawaiian, Pacific Islander	0	0.0%
Multi-Race, Non-Hispanic	12	0.4%
Total	3,097	100%

* Approximate number of enrolled pupils is calculated based on total number of students in district, multiplied by reported percentage, and rounded to nearest whole student.

Enrollment by gender (2021–2022)
Gender	Enrolled pupils	Percentage
Female	1,482	47.85%
Male	1,606	51.86%
Non-binary	9	0.29%
Total	3,097	100%

Enrollment by Grade
Grade	Pupils Enrolled	Percentage
9	830	26.8%
10	760	24.54%
11	764	24.67%
12	712	22.99%
SP*	31	1%
Total	3,097	100%

* SP = Special Education Beyond Grade 12

== Receivership ==
In 2010, more than one out of every four students at LHS had dropped out and only 35 percent of 10th graders were assessed as being proficient in mathematics, according to Massachusetts Department of Elementary and Secondary Education standardized testing results. As a result, the school district was put under receivership by the state Board of Education in January 2012. The receiver named was Jeffrey Riley. In 2012, the dropout rate at the high school was more than 50%.

[The] district ranked in the bottom 1 percent in the state based on math and English test scores when it was placed in receivership by the state education commissioner in the fall of 2011. However, there has been an evident improvement in just two years, with high school graduation rates rising to 67 percent in 2014, up from 52 percent in 2011. [...] Lawrence, with about 14,000 students, has a history of corruption and dysfunction. It was the first school system taken over under the receivership law passed by the State Legislature in 2010. The Legislature gave the receivers extraordinary powers, including extending the school day, changing collective-bargaining agreements, or requiring all staff to reapply for their positions. At the same time, state lawmakers were willing to sweep the system clean in the worst districts if that's what it took to end the cycle of failure that did not happen in Lawrence.

== Controversies ==
On 12 October 2021, multiple fights were reported in one day. Several fights were caught on film and a teacher was injured due to an altercation.

On 20 October 2021, a fight occurred following the school dismissal, which resulted in the arrest of four minors and an adult. Some of the altercation was caught on video.

== Notable alumni ==
- L. J. Figueroa (born 1998), Dominican-American basketball player in the Israeli Basketball Premier League
- Robert Frost (1892), poet
- Thelma Todd (1923), actress and businesswoman
- Denis W. Delaney (1914), American government official, WWI veteran, entertainer, civic leader
