= Southfield School =

Southfield School may refer to:

- Southfield School (Brookline, MA), a private girls' school in Brookline, Massachusetts, United States
- Southfield School, Kettering, a girls' secondary school in Kettering, Northamptonshire, England
- Southfield Christian School, a private college-preparatory school in Southfield, Michigan, United States
- Southfield High School, a high school in Southfield, Michigan, United States
- Southfield-Lathrup High School, a high school in Lathrup Village, Michigan, United States

== See also ==
- Southfield Public Schools
- Southfields Academy
- Southfield (disambiguation)
