= Holyoke Public Schools =

School district in Massachusetts, United States

Coordinates: 42.2064°N 72.6092°W

Location
- Holyoke, Massachusetts United States

District information
- Type: Public; Open enrollment
- Motto: A Pathway for Every Student
- Grades: Pre-K-12
- Superintendent: Anthony Soto, Acting Receiver/Superintendent
- Schools: 11
- Budget: $109,454,221 total $16,568 per pupil (2016)
- NCES District ID: 2506270

Students and staff
- Students: 5,800 +
- Teachers: 495

Other information
- Average SAT scores: 517 verbal 504 math 1021 total (2016–2017)
- Website: www.hps.holyoke.ma.us

Holyoke Public Schools (HPS) is a school district serving the city of Holyoke, Massachusetts, United States.

== Schools ==
=== High schools ===
- Holyoke High School

- North Campus
- South Campus/Dean Campus (Note: Formerly William J. Dean Technical High School)

=== Middle & Elementary Schools ===
- William R. Peck Full Service Community School
- Maurice A. Donahue School
- Dr. Marcella R. Kelly School
- Lt. Elmer J. McMahon School
- William G. Morgan School
- Lt. Clayre P. Sullivan School
- Edward Nelson White School
- Joseph Metcalf Middle

=== Pre-schools and Alternative Schools ===
- Center for Excellence (formally Holyoke Alternative Program)

== See also ==
- List of school districts in Massachusetts
- Holyoke, Massachusetts
