= Hingham School District =

Schools in Massachusetts, United States

Hingham School District is a school district that serves Hingham, Massachusetts, USA.

== Schools ==
- Plymouth River Elementary School
- South Elementary School
- Foster Elementary School
- East Elementary School
- Hingham Middle School. Hingham Middle School is the only public school in Hingham serving three educational grades, 6-8. The school was formed by the merger of South and Central Junior High Schools in the 1990s.
- Hingham High School. Hingham High School is a co-educational, public high school serving grades 9 through 12 for the Town of Hingham. It is located on Union Street near Hingham Center. This school was ranked number 985 on Newsweek's 2005 list of the Best High Schools in America.

== See also ==
- List of school districts in Massachusetts
