= Southfields (disambiguation) =

Southfields is a district of London, England.

Southfields can also refer to:

- Southfields, Essex, England
- Southfields, Leicester, Leicestershire, England
- Southfields, New York, United States

== See also ==
- Southfield (disambiguation)
