= South Field =

South Field may refer to:

- South Field, Berkshire, a location in England
- South Field, East Riding of Yorkshire, a location in England
- South Field (Iwo Jima), World War II airfield in Japan
- South Field (Provo), Utah, soccer stadium in the United States

== See also ==
- Southfield (disambiguation)
