= Avon, Massachusetts =

- Town
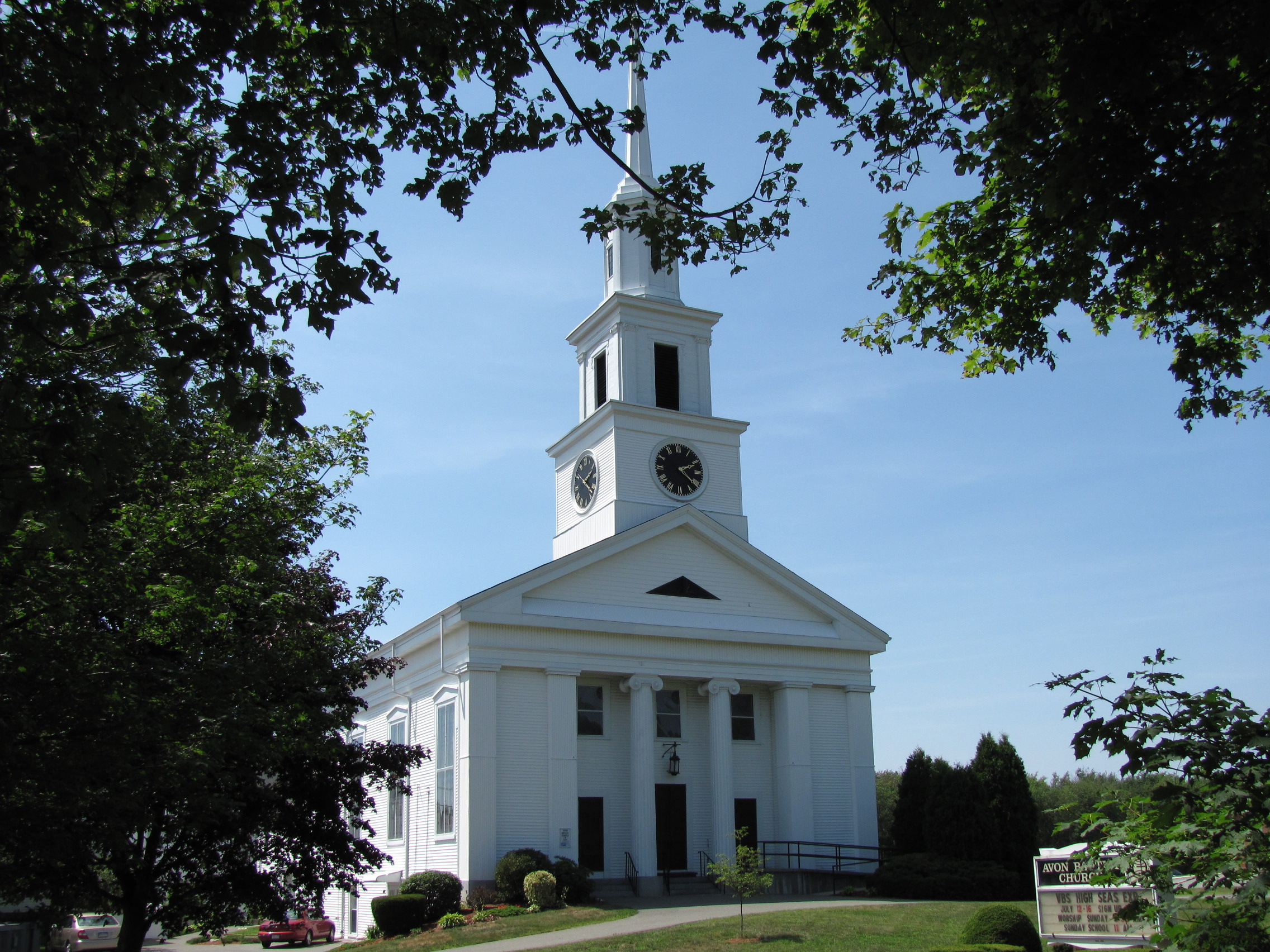
- Avon Baptist Church

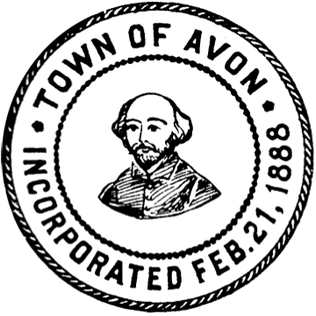
- Seal

- Location in Norfolk County in Massachusetts
- Coordinates: 42°07′50″N 71°02′30″W
- Country: United States
- State: Massachusetts
- County: Norfolk
- Settled: 1700
- Incorporated: 1888

Government
  - Type: Open town meeting
  - Town Administrator: Jonathan Beder
  - Board of Selectmen: Eric S. Beckerman, Chair; Shannon M. Coffey; Jason L. Suzor

Area
  - Total: 4.6 sq mi (11.8 km^{2})
  - Land: 4.4 sq mi (11.3 km^{2})
  - Water: 0.19 sq mi (0.5 km^{2})
- Elevation: 220 ft (67 m)

Population (2020)
  - Total: 4,777
  - Density: 1,095/sq mi (422.7/km^{2})
- Time zone: UTC−5 (Eastern)
  - Summer (DST): UTC−4 (Eastern)
- ZIP Code: 02322
- Area code: 508 / 774
- FIPS code: 25-02935
- GNIS feature ID: 0618314
- Website: www.avon-ma.gov

Avon is a town in Norfolk County, Massachusetts, United States. The population was 4,777 at the 2020 census.

== History ==
The first settler in the land that would become Avon was Moses Curtis (c. 1720), a blacksmith from Braintree, Massachusetts. With most of his surviving children living near him, by 1749 the locale was called Curtis Corners.

Avon's story begins deep in the forest of the Massachusetts Bay Colony, in the territory of the ancient town of Dorchester. In 1630 the Indian chief Chicataubut, in return for a sum of money, gave the English the right to settle Dorchester, south to the top of Blue Hill. After the chief's death, his brother Kitchamakin extended the boundary line farther southward, all the way to the Plymouth Colony line. This "New Grant" as it was called, gave the town of Dorchester title over 40,000 acres, making it the largest town in New England.

In 1726 Dorchester's South Precinct, holding the present-day towns of Stoughton, Avon, Sharon, Canton, and Foxborough, as well as parts of Wrenthham (Plainville) and Dedham, was set aside and incorporated under the name Stoughton. Its neighbor to the east, also resting on the Plymouth Colony line, was the town of Braintree, which at the time included present-day Quincy, Holbrook, and Randolph.

The road through the southeasternmost corner of "Old Stoughton" was little more than a cart trail when Moses Curtis arrived from Braintree in 1720. Known simply as the "Old Beaten Path", it arched its back in a southwesterly direction after crossing the present-day Randolph line, and then gradually turned southeasterly as it approached the Bay Colony line, about two miles away. What attracted Curtis to this location is unknown, but it is fair to say that he had chosen one of the most isolated spots possible for settlement.

By 1720 only five houses preceded the Curtis homested in all of the present Stoughton-Avon area, and his stood virtually alone in the far southeastern corner of the "New Grant"...

— A History of Avon, Massachusetts 1720–1988, by William F. Hanna

The Third Baptist Meeting House was erected in East Stoughton on March 30, 1848.

Following a petition sent through the Massachusetts House of Representatives and the Massachusetts Senate, the new town of Avon was separated from Stoughton and incorporated on February 21, 1888. The town was named after Stratford-upon-Avon, Warwickshire, England. The town's seal features a portrait of William Shakespeare, who was born in Stratford-upon-Avon.

== Geography ==
According to the United States Census Bureau, the town has a total area of 4.6 square miles (12 km^{2}), of which 4.4 square miles (11 km^{2}) is land and 0.2 square miles (0.52 km^{2}) (4.16%) is water. Avon is bordered by the City of Brockton on the south, Stoughton on the west, Randolph on the northeast, and Holbrook on the east. Avon is 17 miles (27 km) south of Boston.

== Demographics ==
Historical population
Year	Pop.	±%
1890	1,384	—
1900	1,741	+25.8%
1910	2,013	+15.6%
1920	2,176	+8.1%
1930	2,414	+10.9%
1940	2,335	−3.3%
1950	2,666	+14.2%
1960	4,301	+61.3%
1970	5,295	+23.1%
1980	5,026	−5.1%
1990	4,558	−9.3%
2000	4,443	−2.5%
2010	4,356	−2.0%
2020	4,777	+9.7%
2022*	4,735	−0.9%
* = population estimate. Source: United States Census records and Population Estimates Program data.

At the 2000 census, there were 4,443 people, 1,705 households and 1,220 families residing in the town. The population density was 1,014.7 inhabitants per square mile (391.8/km^{2}). There were 1,740 housing units at an average density of 397.4 per square mile (153.4/km^{2}). The racial makeup of the town was 93.45% White, 3.74% African American, 0.27% Native American, 0.92% Asian, 0.77% from other races, and 0.86% from two or more races. Hispanic or Latino of any race were 1.44% of the population.

There were 1,705 households, of which 26.7% had children under the age of 18 living with them, 55.5% were married couples living together, 12.0% had a female householder with no husband present, and 28.4% were non-families. Of all households 23.5% were made up of individuals, and 12.3% had someone living alone who was 65 years of age or older. The average household size was 2.61 and the average family size was 3.13.

Age distribution was 22.5% under the age of 18, 7.0% from 18 to 24, 28.8% from 25 to 44, 24.2% from 45 to 64, and 17.6% who were 65 years of age or older. The median age was 40 years. For every 100 females, there were 91.8 males. For every 100 females age 18 and over, there were 88.0 males.

The median household income was $50,305, and the median family income was $60,625. Males had a median income of $41,582 versus $32,837 for females. The per capita income for the town was $24,410. About 4.3% of families and 6.6% of the population were below the poverty line, including 12.5% of those under age 18 and 4.2% of those age 65 or over.

== Economy ==
Avon serves as a regional employment center in the South Shore, with approximately 23% of land being used for industrial or commercial use. The Avon Industrial Park is the primary hub for economic infrastructure in the town, with approximately 500-acres of land designated as a business district. Located near route 24, the park contains 127 firms which employ over 3,600 people.

The industrial sector of Avon includes a variety of industries, businesses, and logistic providers. Notable facilities include the 109,000 square-foot asset on Parker Drive, which houses the distributional operations for companies like HelloFresh and Taylor Communications. In 2025, the town was awarded a $70,000 grant for improvements to planning the zoning of more economic centers, as well as updating the sewer systems and regulatory frameworks. In recognition of high level financial management, Avon received the GFOA Distinguished Budget Presentation Award in August of 2025.

== Government ==
Avon is governed by a three-person Board of Selectmen who appoint a Town Administrator to carry out the day to day executive functions of the Board. Legislation is enacted in an Open Town Meeting.

== Education ==
The Avon School District serves Avon.

== Transportation ==
The town is served by the Brockton Area Transit Authority and the Massachusetts Bay Transportation Authority (MBTA), which provide public transit service to Brockton and Boston.
