= Denis W. Delaney =

American government official and WWI veteran

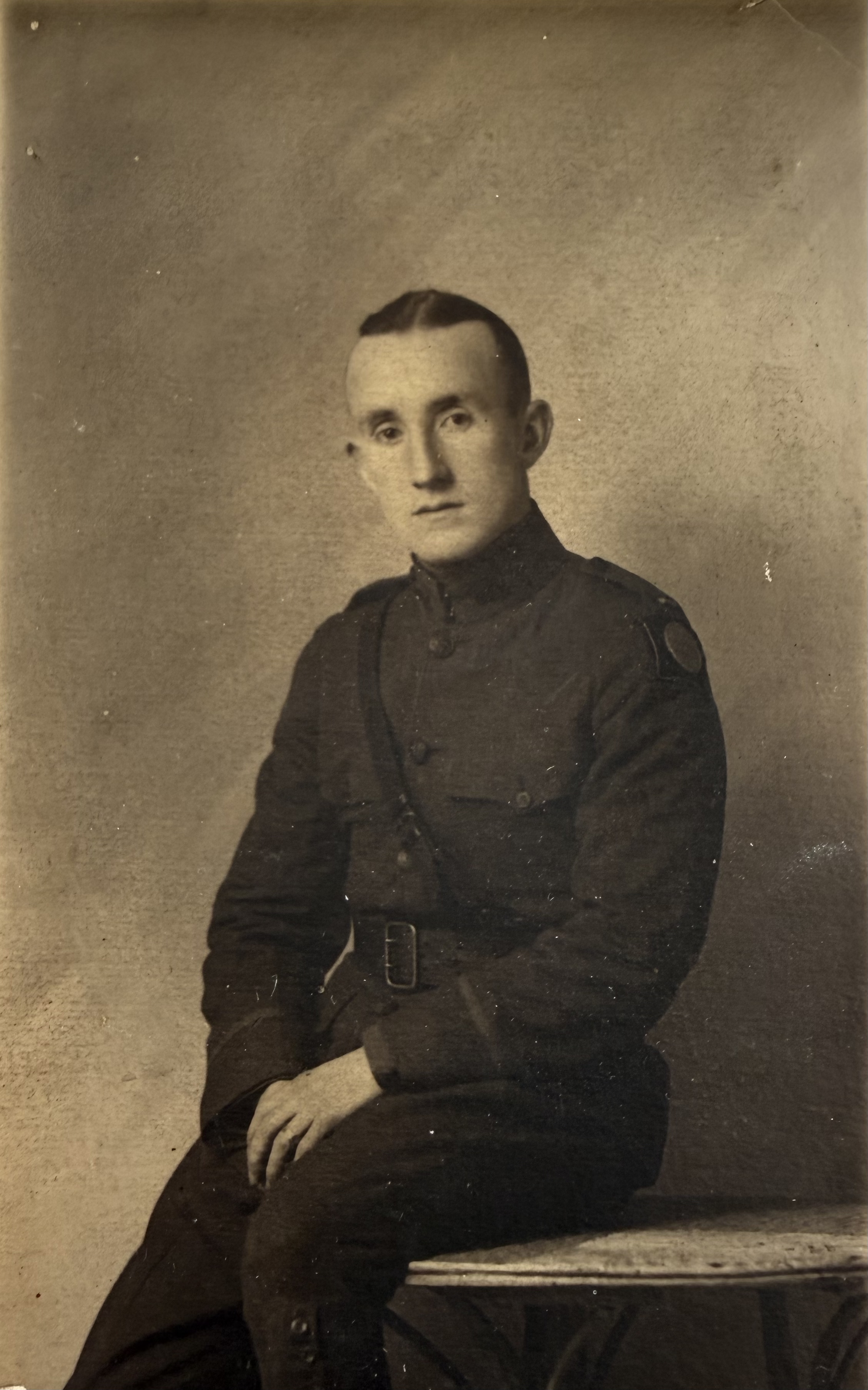
- Delaney, U.S. Army enlistment photo, 1917
- Born: April 13, 1896; Lawrence, Massachusetts, U.S.
- Died: February 13, 1968 (aged 71)
- Occupations: Government official, civic leader, entertainer

Denis W. Delaney (April 13, 1896 – February 13, 1968), also known as Denie, was an American government official, civic leader, World War I veteran, and entertainer from Lawrence, Essex County, Massachusetts.

He served as the state administrator of the Works Progress Administration in Massachusetts following his appointment during the administration of President Franklin D. Roosevelt. In this role, he oversaw a large workforce engaged in public works projects. He later served as Collector of Internal Revenue for the District of Massachusetts.

== Early life and education ==
Delaney was born on April 13, 1896, in Lawrence, Massachusetts, the son of Martin J. Delaney and Ellen Cahill Delaney. He attended St. Mary's and the Packard schools before graduating from Lawrence High School, where he served as class president all four years, captained the track team, and earned letters in football and basketball.

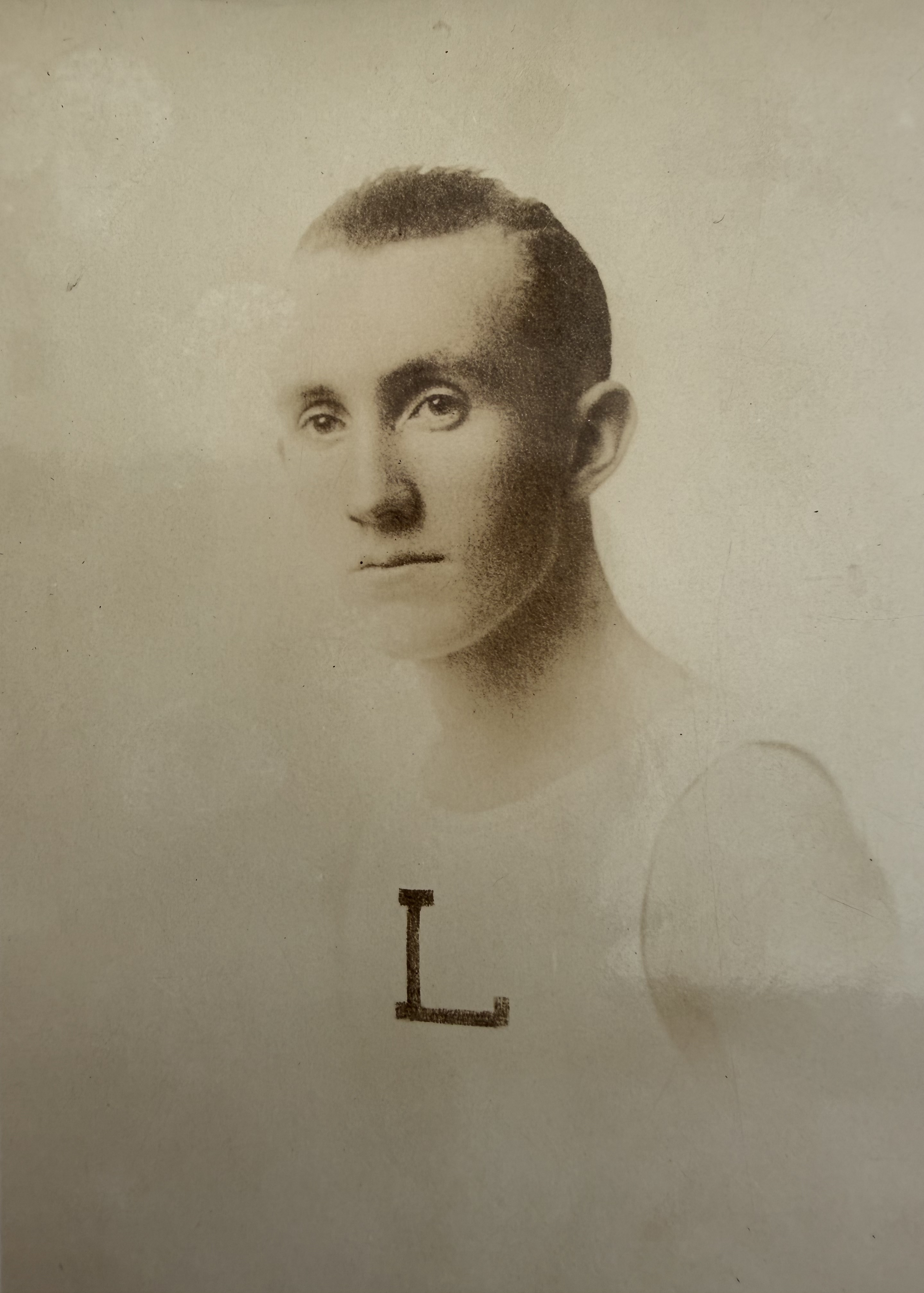
Delaney as track team captain, Lawrence High School, circa 1912-1913

He was a member of the 1914 Lawrence High School football team that defeated rival Lowell 20 to 0 on Thanksgiving Day. After his first year at Lawrence High School, financial difficulties at home forced him to leave school temporarily. He worked at the Pacific Mills in Lawrence for two years before returning to complete his education. He enrolled at Boston College after graduation but left to enlist in the Army at the outset of World War I.

== World War I ==
Delaney enlisted as a private and was assigned to the 19th Company, 5th Battalion, 151st Depot Brigade at Camp Devens, Massachusetts. He rose through the ranks to corporal, sergeant, and first sergeant. He served with the 69th New York Infantry of the 42nd Rainbow Division and with the 325th Infantry of the 82nd Division, taking part in major engagements including the battles of Verdun and Saint-Mihiel. He was made battalion adjutant and later served as a member of the general staff of the 82nd Division.

He was wounded on September 9, 1918, on the road leading into Thiaucourt, France, in the preliminary action preceding the Battle of Saint-Mihiel. Special Orders No. 124 dated September 21, 1918, issued by Headquarters, 103rd Infantry, 26th Division, signed by order of Colonel Berry and prepared by Captain Robert G. Watson, Personnel Adjutant, granted First Sergeant Denis W. Delaney permission to wear the wound chevron for that wound.

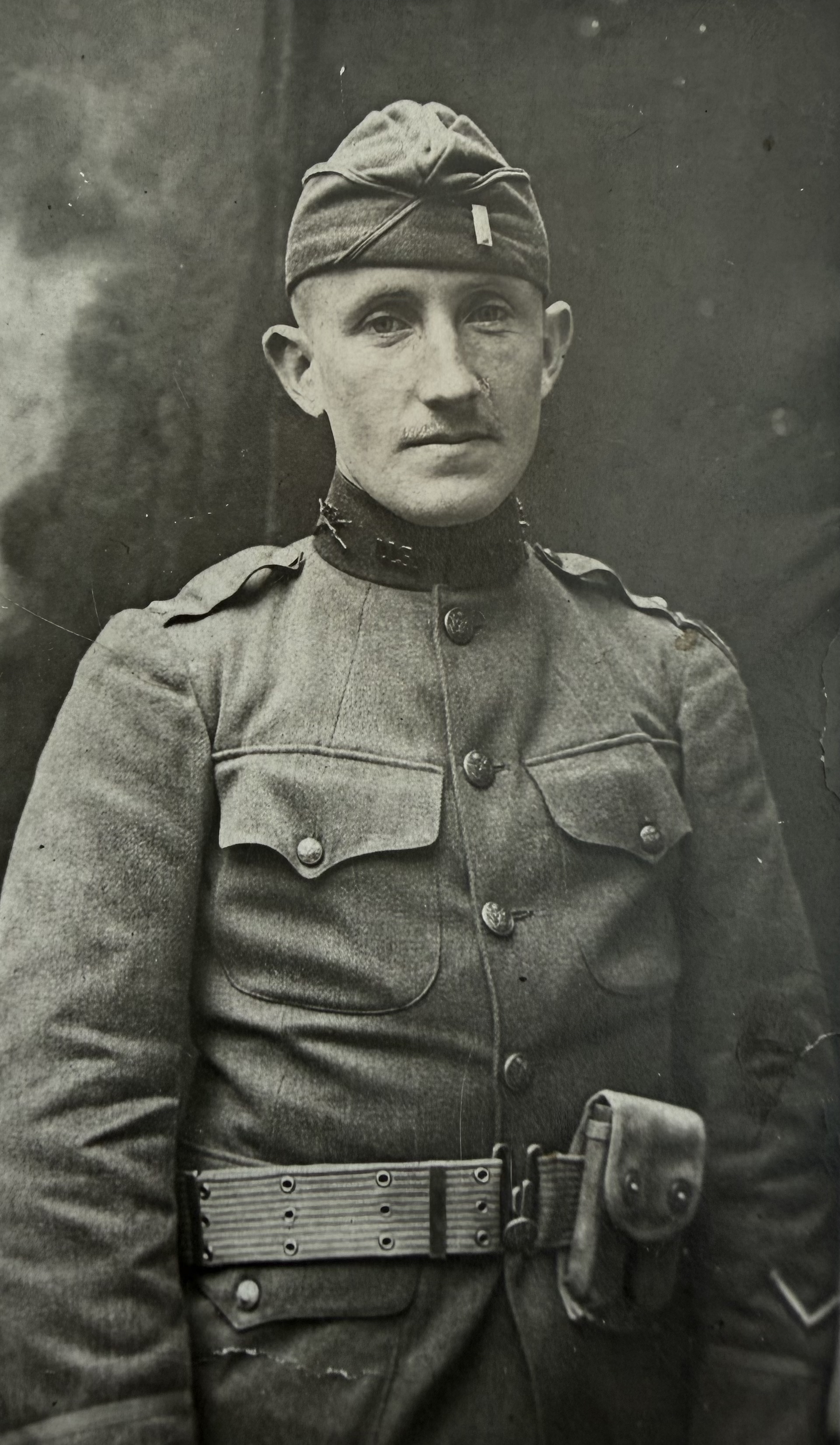
Delaney wearing his wound chevron, circa 1918-1919

He was also wounded on a separate occasion and was gassed during his service. He was cited and decorated for bravery under fire, and was honorably discharged as a first lieutenant, holding a captain's commission in the reserve corps.

The effects of the gas were severe. After the war Delaney weighed only 103 pounds and was given only a few months to live. He spent many years in Hanover, New Hampshire, fighting to regain his health, and he won.

At the close of the war he earned an A.B. degree from the University of Bordeaux, France, and a certificate in finance from the Tuck School at Dartmouth College.

A 1920 Lawrence newspaper account identified Delaney as having served with the 76th Division, while his 1968 obituary and a 1928 profile identify his service with the 42nd Rainbow Division and the 82nd Division. Soldiers were frequently transferred between units during the war.

== Postwar recovery ==
When Delaney returned from France his health was broken. He first worked for the Robinson-Toohey Company of Lawrence and then for the Horace Partridge Sporting Goods Company of Boston. In September 1920 he went north to Hanover, New Hampshire, home of Dartmouth College, where he opened a haberdashery and sporting goods store adjacent to the college, becoming known to thousands of Dartmouth men throughout the country. He spent eight years in Hanover in total, slowly recovering his strength, before returning to Lawrence and entering the construction business with his brother, William J. Delaney.

== Postwar career and education ==
Back in Lawrence, Delaney and his brother William J. Delaney built a successful construction firm. Their projects included the Eagle Tribune Publishing Plant in Lawrence, the Lawrence and Lynn High School stadiums, Beebe Junior High School in Malden, and several apartment buildings. Characteristically, he spent his evenings continuing his education, earning a certificate in engineering from the Lowell Institute and a bachelor of laws degree from Northeastern University. He married Mary E. Dempsey, a Lawrence schoolteacher he had met while serving on the Lawrence School Committee.

In 1933, while building a school in Winchester and another in Bedford, four Lawrence, Massachusetts banks collapsed and wiped out the resources of the business. He was 35 years old, recently married and the father of a young daughter, Patricia, born on March 15. At that time March 15 was the federal individual income tax filing deadline, a fact that was not lost on her father.

== Political career ==
In August 1928 Delaney filed nomination papers at the State House for the Democratic nomination for State Senator from the 5th Essex District, comprising Lawrence and Methuen. The Lawrence press noted his war record, his athletic achievements at Lawrence High School, and his standing in the community. He served as an elected member of the Lawrence School Board from 1924 to 1928 and was an unsuccessful candidate for alderman. He served as chair of the Lawrence High School Athletic Advisory Board.

Though Delaney stood high in the councils of the Democratic Party, he was rarely seen in the places where politicians gathered. He had decided long ago that he could do more for the administration he served by staying on the job than by spending time at the State House or the Hotel Bellevue. His loyalty was to the work, and the work spoke for itself.

== A fresh start ==
With his business gone, Delaney applied for work with the Civil Works Administration as a ditch digger. It was the bottom of the ladder and he knew it, but he was not the kind of man to wait for better times. Within eight weeks he had been moved to the administrative side of federal relief. He then joined the Emergency Relief Administration. In August 1939 President Roosevelt named him WPA administrator for Massachusetts.

== Works Progress Administration ==
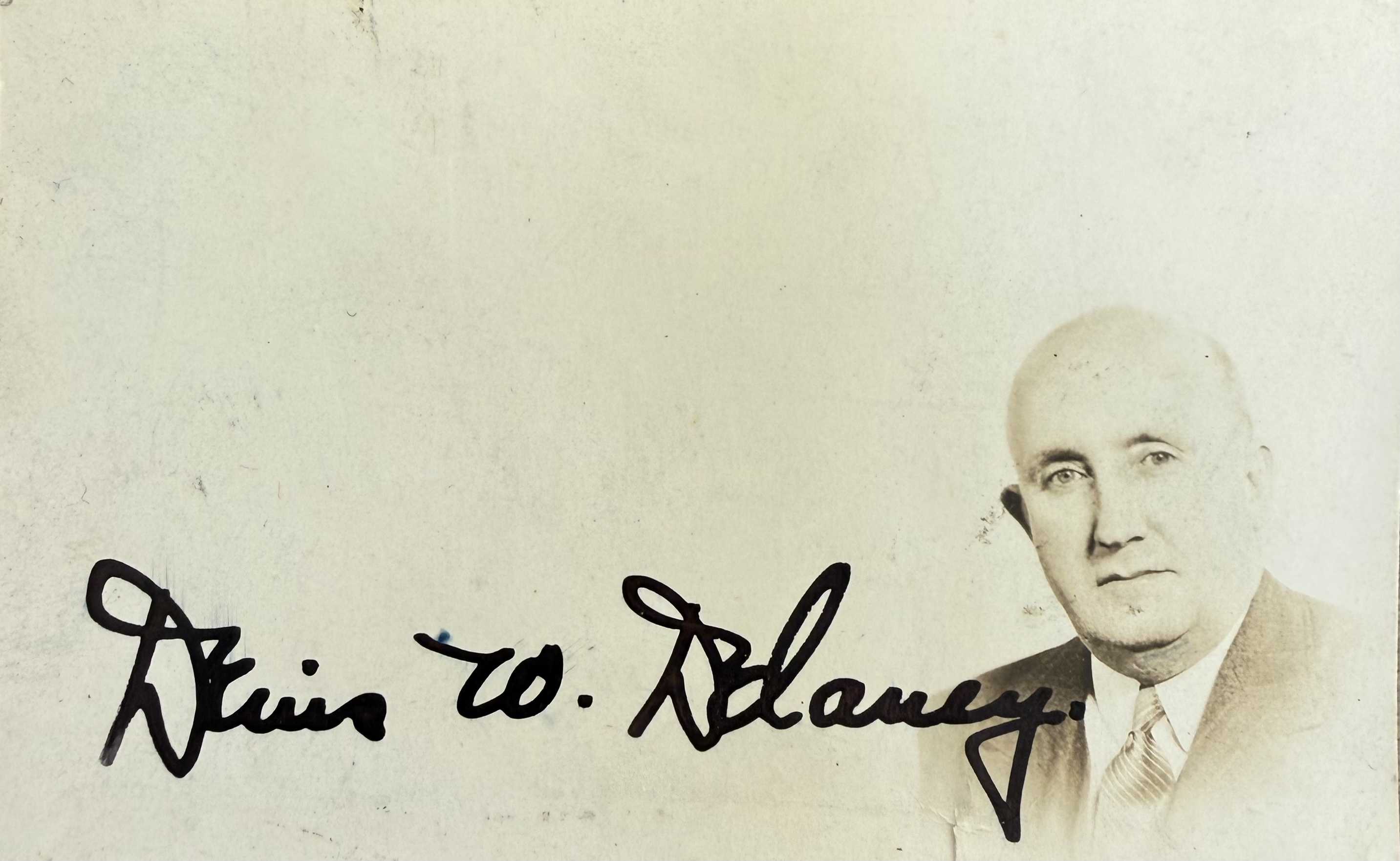
Delaney as Massachusetts WPA administrator, signed photograph, circa 1939-1943

Delaney was placed in charge of 385,000 workers. Under his administration the Massachusetts WPA oversaw more than 800 projects across 173 cities and towns, employing more than 20,000 white collar workers. Projects included major defense infrastructure work such as airbase construction at North Chicopee, Massachusetts, projected to employ between 2,000 and 3,000 workers. During the February 1940 blizzard he negotiated federal emergency funds from Washington for snow removal to reach isolated Massachusetts families. In May 1940 he organized a statewide open house running May 20 to 25, at which Eleanor Roosevelt addressed a series of suppers on the opening evening. As the United States moved toward war, Delaney attended national coordination meetings between Army officers and WPA authorities to subordinate non-defense projects to the war effort. The WPA was liquidated in 1943 and most of its workers transitioned to war work.

== Collector of Internal Revenue ==
President Roosevelt appointed Delaney Collector of Internal Revenue for the District of Massachusetts on February 1, 1944. Two months after taking office, Delaney was summoned to Washington by President Roosevelt. At that meeting Roosevelt told him to keep in mind two things: collect money as quickly as possible and get it into the treasury, and keep people in business. Delaney later testified that he came back to Boston with renewed vigor, as he said every man did who ever talked to Roosevelt, and tried to carry out exactly what the President had asked. President Truman reappointed him to a second term in approximately 1949.

The office Delaney inherited ranked last in efficiency among all Class A offices in the nation. Records were incomplete, letters went unanswered, taxpayer complaints arrived at 200 per week, and there was a general sense among Massachusetts taxpayers that they were not being properly served. Delaney took it as a challenge. For the first six months he worked 18 hours a day, seven days a week. It took four years, but he brought the office to first place among all Class A collector's offices in the nation, ranking first in collecting taxes that were collectible, first in deposits, first in responding to correspondence, and first in what the Treasury Department officially rated as courtesy and service to taxpayers. Complaint letters fell from 200 per week to fewer than one per month.

His method was simple and personal. He required that every complaint come directly to his desk. He investigated each one himself, corrected what was wrong where the complaint was legitimate, and acknowledged each letter by return mail. He also made a practice of walking through every department in the building twice daily to speak with employees, and he made changes to make their work more efficient and more pleasant. The office received more mail than any other office in Massachusetts and handled more money than Brinks.

He fought for years to move the office out of inadequate quarters on Milk Street. Using his background as a construction engineer, he supervised the conversion of the Old Post Office garage on Ipswich Street into a modern facility capable of processing tax returns at scale. The Treasury Department funded the move.

In that role he was responsible for the collection of approximately $2 billion in taxes annually from 2.5 million Massachusetts residents. One profile noted that any private sector executive running a $2 billion operation would command a salary well into six figures, while Delaney's government pay was, by comparison, a pittance. He was not the slightest bit envious.

On May 22, 1944, his wife Mary E. Delaney of Lawrence served as sponsor at the launching of the USS SC-1503 at the Calderwood Yacht Yard in Manchester, Massachusetts.

== Entertainment and public life ==
Delaney was a popular after-dinner speaker and entertainer with a tenor voice, well known for his renditions of Irish songs. He performed on radio and on television, and his recording of "Galway Bay" appeared on jukeboxes as far away as San Francisco. His record album, titled The Smiling Irish Voice of Denis Delaney, Lyric Tenor of Boston's Famed Clover Club, was produced by Dance Tone Record Company of Medford, Massachusetts and sold for the benefit of the Archbishop Cushing Charity Fund. The album contained five Irish songs, with a sixth side devoted to a Saint Patrick's Day Prayer by Archbishop Cushing. It became a bestseller that reached homes in all 48 states.

On one occasion Fred Waring brought him on stage, without warning, to a microphone before a nationwide radio audience during a Boston Garden charity event and he became the singing hit of the show. He thought nothing of it. That was simply Delaney.

He was a regular head table guest of the Clover Club of Boston, one of the city's most storied Irish American institutions.

== Civic leadership and charity work ==
Delaney served as President of the Gridiron Club of Greater Boston for the 1948 to 1949 term. Founded in 1932, the club is one of New England's oldest sports organizations, dedicated to promoting football and sportsmanship. He often served on the committee awarding the Swede Nelson Award, and in January 1950 he was present at the award presentation to Notre Dame quarterback Bob Williams.

In 1946 he served as chairman of a two-day country fair and horse show at the Weymouth fairgrounds organized to benefit Archbishop Richard J. Cushing's charity funds, supplementing a $600,000 gift from the Joseph P. Kennedy family to build a convalescent home for sick children. A photograph from the event shows Delaney seated next to John F. Kennedy, then a newly elected Massachusetts congressman, among the committee members.

He was a member of the Elks, the Ancient Order of Hibernians, and the American Legion. He served for eight years as Suffolk County chairman of the March of Dimes. He also chaired at various times the Community Fund, the Red Cross, the Salvation Army, and the Volunteers of America.

In 1946 Delaney received the Citation of Merit from the American Legion, Department of Massachusetts. The citation recognized Delaney's 28 years of humanitarian service, specifically his work on behalf of disabled veterans of both world wars and his fundraising for those afflicted with infantile paralysis. He organized the annual President Roosevelt Birthday Ball in Boston and served as president of the Suffolk County chapter of the National Federation to Combat Infantile Paralysis. He chaired the emergency food collection drive in Boston on behalf of the United Nations Relief and Rehabilitation Administration. He was a member of Lawrence Post 15 of the American Legion and a charter member of the Legion's first convention in Paris.

The cause closest to his heart was the Archbishop Cushing Charity Fund. He founded it personally, paid the incorporation fee out of his own pocket, and directed it almost single-handedly for years. He brought Kate Smith, Ted Mack, and Fred Waring to Boston Garden for the fund. He never asked for recognition. He did these things, as one who knew him well observed, purely for the pleasure he got out of it.

== Indictment, trials, and legal legacy ==
During the early 1950s the Truman administration faced a nationwide scandal involving corruption within the Bureau of Internal Revenue. Revenue collectors at the time were political patronage appointments, not civil servants, and were permitted to simultaneously pursue private business, a structure that produced abuse across the country. Delaney was suspended by presidential order on June 27, 1951, and removed from office on July 16, 1951. A federal grand jury returned two indictments on September 14, 1951. The first charged him with receiving payments to influence his decisions as Collector. The second charged him with making false certificates of discharge of tax liens.

Delaney denied the charges. He testified that he had agreed only to refer insurance prospects to a man named Daniel Friedman, and that when commission checks from Friedman began to arrive he deposited them and reported $10,000 of the income on his 1949 tax return. A Harper's Magazine account of the case published in June 1953 reported that Delaney testified he had agreed to endorse checks through a business name at Friedman's request, believing the arrangement was connected to the insurance referral, and that Friedman deflected his questions about whom he had sold insurance to. At trial, Delaney produced hotel bills and canceled checks to substantiate his claim that he was in other parts of the country in early May 1949, when Friedman claimed to have paid him $2,500.

Contemporary press coverage noted additional irregularities in the government's handling of the case. A Boston Traveler article titled "Contempt of Court?" reported that Representative Cecil R. King had summoned 12 witnesses to Washington for public hearings on the Delaney case before the trial had taken place or a verdict rendered, describing the move as an unprecedented irregularity. A Lawrence Tribune article further reported that Delaney's telephone had been tapped.

While the criminal case was pending, the House Ways and Means Subcommittee on Administration of the Internal Revenue Laws, known as the King Committee and chaired by Representative Cecil R. King of California, opened public hearings focused on Delaney on October 16, 1951. The hearings ran through October 22, 1951. Motion pictures and sound recordings were permitted during the proceedings. Witnesses who had testified before the grand jury appeared before the committee without being subject to cross-examination by Delaney's counsel. The hearings ranged far beyond the scope of the indictments, covering matters for which Delaney had not been charged. At the close of the hearings the committee chairman made public statements about Delaney that were reported in the press before he had faced a jury.

Even the Department of Justice was disturbed. A Special Assistant to the Attorney General appeared before the King Committee and argued urgently against the public disclosure of the testimony, warning that it would compromise the criminal proceedings. The warning went unheeded.

Delaney's counsel sent a formal letter of protest to the committee, arguing that further proceedings at that time could "serve no other purpose than to further prejudice Mr. Delaney's rights to a fair trial." The trial court denied his motions to dismiss and to delay. Trial opened January 3, 1952. On January 22, 1952, the jury returned guilty verdicts on all six counts. Judgments of conviction were entered January 29, 1952.

Delaney appealed to the United States Court of Appeals for the First Circuit. The court overturned the conviction, finding that the King Committee had invited and stimulated massive pretrial publicity that, in the court's own words, had "pretty thoroughly blackened and discredited" Delaney's character before he ever faced a jury. The court found that some of the damaging material presented at the committee hearings would not have been admissible at trial, that none of the testimony had been tested by cross-examination, and that the United States, acting through its legislative branch, had placed Delaney "under a heavy handicap in establishing his innocence at the impending trial."

The case, Delaney v. United States, 199 F.2d 107 (1st Cir. 1952), established a significant precedent in American law on the right to a fair trial when congressional hearings generate prejudicial pretrial publicity. It has been cited in federal courts for more than seven decades, including as recently as 2022 in proceedings arising from the January 6 Select Committee hearings.

Following the First Circuit ruling, Delaney faced a separate indictment on a new charge: willful evasion of his own federal income taxes in the amount of $2,974.45. He pleaded guilty to that charge and was sentenced to one year and one day at Danbury Federal Prison. He served eight months.

== Death ==
Denis W. Delaney died on February 13, 1968. He was 71 years old. Obituaries appeared in the Lawrence Tribune, the Boston Globe, and the Lowell Sun, and his passing was noted in several other Massachusetts newspapers that day.
