= Avon School District (Massachusetts) =

School district in Massachusetts, United States

Address
- 1 Patrick Clark Dr Avon, Norfolk County, Massachusetts, 02322; United States

District information
- Superintendent: Christine Godino

Other information
- Website: www.avon.k12.ma.us

The Avon School District is the school district of Avon, Massachusetts, United States. It has two schools, Ralph D. Butler Elementary School and Avon Middle-High School.

== History ==
The district's modern structure emerged over the mid-20th century, following consolidation of local schools as smaller neighborhood schools closed and central facilities were built. Around 1955, Avon consolidated its local schools into a central school building to serve a wider range of grade levels, replacing or supplementing older, smaller facilities.

In 1993, 142 students living in Brockton attended school in the Avon School District as part of a voluntary school choice program of the State of Massachusetts. 22 were previously students in parochial or private schools and never attended a Brockton Public Schools (BPS) school.

William J. Contreras became the superintendent in 1996 after being the superintendent of the Hatfield, Massachusetts school system. Contreras changed districts to be close to family members. Contreras stated that he had encountered a situation in which teachers were not given contracts even though they should have received them, and that having a new point of view allowed him to make a compromise that solved the problem.

A subsequent superintendent, Margaret Frieswyk, decided to have a curriculum on the culture of China created after she visited China. Her visit was done to study the educational system of that country and it was funded by a Fulbright scholarship. She considered establishing a student exchange with China and having Mandarin Chinese as a foreign language in the district. Previously, the school district had Latin language courses, but in 2008 it no longer had a teacher for them, and could not find one.

In 2004 repairs were done to the middle-high school. The district had to use two churches and Randolph High School as space to house students while the repairs occurred.

Ronald Seely was principal of the middle-high school until his 2005 death.

Paul Zinni was the superintendent of this district until 2018, when he became the superintendent of the King Philip Regional School District.

While not part of the formal district's internal history, Avon itself was settled as a town in the 19th century and celebrated its centennial in 1988, at which point a commissioned history documented the town's evolution, including its educational institutions.
