= South Hadley Public Schools =

School district in Massachusetts, United States

Location
- Massachusetts; United States

District information
- Type: Public; Open enrollment
- Grades: Pre K - 12
- Superintendent: Jennifer Voyik
- Accreditation: NEASC
- Schools: 4
- Budget: $29,624,595 total $14,315 per pupil (2016)

Other information
- Website: www.southhadleyschools.org

South Hadley Public Schools, also known as South Hadley School Department, is a school district in South Hadley, Massachusetts, United States. The superintendent is Mark McLaughlin.

== Governance ==
A five-person school committee, the equivalent of a board of education elsewhere, oversees the school district. The chairman of the school committee is Eric Friesner.

== Schools ==
The district operates the following schools:

- Henry J. Skala Elementary School
- Mosier Elementary School
- Michael E. Smith Middle School
- South Hadley High School

== Bullying incident ==
South Hadley High School came to the attention of the national news media as the result of the suicide of 15-year-old student Phoebe Prince on January 14, 2010.
