= Lawrence Public Schools (Massachusetts) =

School district in Massachusetts, United States

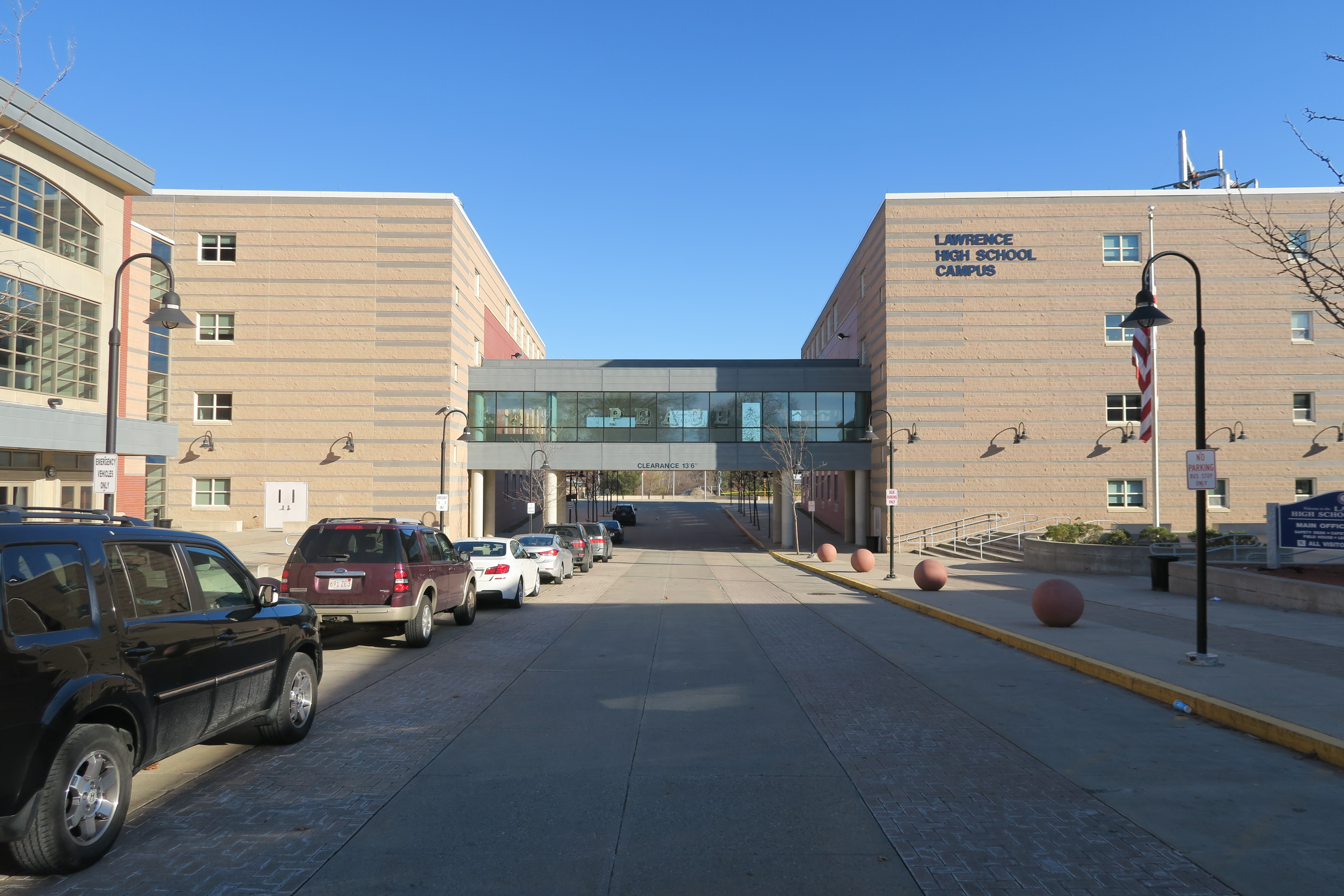
Lawrence High School

Lawrence Public Schools (LPS) is a school district headquartered in Lawrence, Massachusetts.

== History ==
The Massachusetts Department of Education took control of the school district in 2011 due to low performance of schools; the district was in the bottom 1% of school districts in the state. The state established the school board Lawrence Alliance for Education and appointed its members. In 2014, WBUR reported there were higher test scores.

In 2021, groups of parents advocated for the return of an elected school board to again govern the district again.

In 2024, the school district appointed Ralph Carrero as the next superintendent.

In 2025 the Commissioner of the Massachusetts Department of Elementary and Secondary Education, Pedro Martinez made an official determination that the City of Lawrence will not regain control of their school system due to lack of academic improvement.

== Schools ==
1-12 schools

- School for Exceptional Studies

6-12 schools

- RISE Academy

High schools (9-12)

- Lawrence High School
- High School Learning Center

K-8 schools

- School for Exceptional Studies at Bruce Annex
- Wetherbee School

3-8 schools

- Bruce School

Middle schools

- Arlington Middle School (5–8)
- Frost Middle School (5–8)
- Guilmette Middle School (5–8)
- Leonard Middle School (6–8)
- Oliver Middle School (6–8)
- Parthum Middle School (5–8)
- Spark Academy School (6–8)

Elementary schools

- Arlington Elementary (K-4)
- Frost Elementary (K-4)
- Guilmette Elementary (1-4)
- Hennessey School (PK-2)
- Francis M. Leahy School (PK-5)
  - Construction of a new campus began in 2023. The cost is $103,000,000.
- Oliver Elementary School (1-5)
- Parthum Elementary School (K-4)
- South Lawrence East Elementary School (1-5)
- Tarbox School (1-5)

Pre-Kindergarten and Kindergarten

- Breen School
- Lawlor School
- Lawrence Family Public Academy
- Rollins School

Other

- Adult Learning Center
