= South Shore Charter Public School =

Location
- 100 Longwater Circle; Norwell, Massachusetts, (Plymouth County) 02061; United States; 42°9′24″N 70°52′54″W

Information
- School type: Public, charter
- Established: 1995
- Director: Alicia Savage
- Principal: Angie Pepin
- Grades: K–12
- Enrollment: 927 (2017-2018)
- Website: www.sscps.org

The South Shore Charter Public School (SSCPS) is a public charter school located in Norwell, Massachusetts, United States. SSCPS serves students from kindergarten through 12th grade. The school's student population, as of the 2022–2023 academic school year is 1,009 students.

To become a student of the school, one must apply and be selected in a lottery process. Spots that have the most attention are generally in the lower grades whereas high school (especially 11th and 12th grade) generally has the shortest waiting list for new students.

== History ==
The school (founded in 1995) formerly operated under the name of "South Shore Charter School" and was divided into three different grade based locations along the shore of Nantasket Beach in Hull, Massachusetts prior to moving to its new location, Norwell, Massachusetts, in 2004, whereupon all three entities unified into one school.

In 2010, the school was nominated by Scholastics as America's Greenest School and was rewarded with a hybrid school bus. In addition, the school also won $20,000 for a “green audit/makeover for the school,” a $3,000 scholarship to be divided among the grades, and $500 for classroom supplies.

== Curriculum ==
The Massachusetts Curriculum Frameworks serve as the foundation for the K–12 curriculum, with some fusion with the Core Knowledge Curriculum pioneered by pedagogue E.D Hirsch. It blends traditional academics intended to get students ready for college expectations with hands-on learning via Projects & Workshops.

At South Shore Charter Public School, projects and workshops play a crucial role in the school's educational philosophies and mission. These projects and workshops are structured as experiential learning structures that allow students to apply knowledge and skills (outlined in the Massachusetts Curriculum Frameworks) to specific tasks that fulfill community needs.

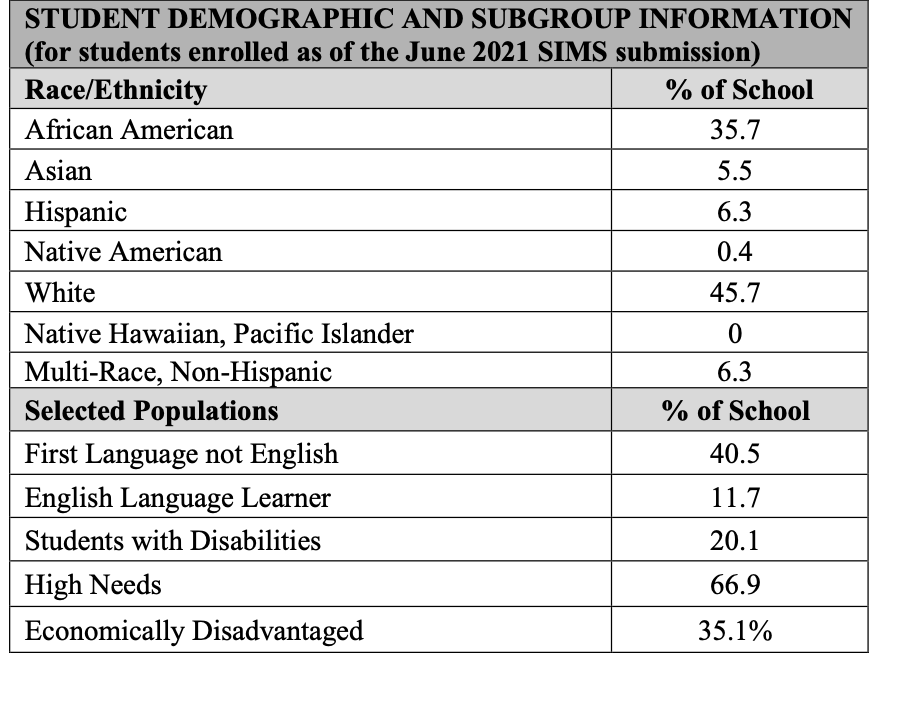
Appendix C: School and Student Data Tables

== Community Service ==
One of South Shore Charter Public School's driving principles is service. All students K-12 are required to fulfill community service hours outside of school.

== Names ==
- South Shore Charter School (SSCS, Hull) (1995–2004)
- South Shore Charter Public School (SSCPS, Norwell) (2004–present)

== Notable faculty ==
Jody Regan — New England artist
