= Andover Public Schools (Massachusetts) =

Massachusetts public school district

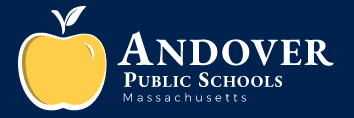

Address
- 36 Bartlet Street Andover, Essex, Massachusetts, 01810
- Coordinates: 42.654934°N 71.135592°W

District information
- Type: Public
- Grades: PK–12
- Established: 1866
- Superintendent: Magda C. Parvey
- School board: Lauren Conoscenti, Chair; Shauna Murray; Lauren Diffenbach; Christopher Shepley; Jacob Tamarkin
- Governing agency: Town of Andover
- Schools: 10 Total; 1 Preschool(PK-2); 5 Elementary(K-5); 3 Middle(6–8); 1 Senior High(9–12)
- Budget: $99,600,924 – FY2024
- NCES District ID: 2501950
- District ID: MA DOE: 00090000

Students and staff
- Students: 5,856
- Faculty: 893.17 FTE
- Teachers: 470.90 FTE
- Student–teacher ratio: 12.7 to 1
- Colors: Navy blue and gold

Other information
- Website: aps1.net

The Andover Public Schools district is the public school district for the town of Andover, Massachusetts. Overseeing 10 educational facilities, ranging from pre-kindergarten to the 12th grade, the district is administrated by superintendent Magda Parvey, who reports directly to an elected school committee, consisting of five residents of the town elected for three-year terms.

== History ==
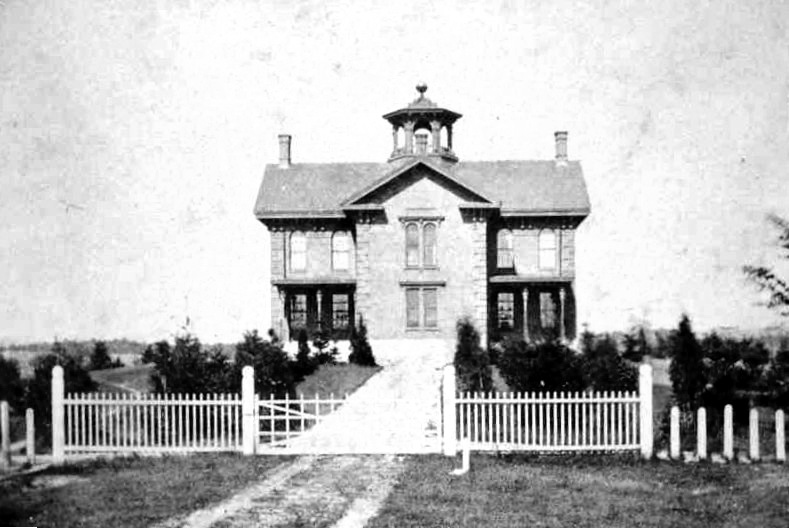
A photograph of the Punchard Free School in 1855, Andover's first public school

=== Districts schools system ===
In the mid and late 18th century, Andover was divided into two parishes, north and south respectively, and centered in each were grammar schools to serve the children of those regions. In 1753, Andover housed five "reading and writing schools" and by March 1795, each parish would contain six district schools. The twelve schools would continue to operate until the District School system was abolished in 1866 when the Andover Public Schools district would assume the responsibilities for all schools in the town, rather than have each school operate independently by members of their district.

=== The Punchard Free School ===
Although Andover had been home to an early secondary education 'industry', with such private institutions as Phillips Academy in 1778 and Andover Theological Seminary in 1807, the town would not have their first public high school until 1854 with the foundation of the Punchard Free School. After his death, Benjamin Hanover Punchard, an Andover resident, left $50,000 for the purpose of building a high school which any qualified resident of the town could attend without charge. The first graduating class in 1857 consisted of seven students. Although the original school was destroyed in a fire in 1869, the school would continue to operate out of Town Hall until facilities were rebuilt in 1871. The Trustees of Punchard's estate and the Town of Andover would evenly split the staffing expenses for the school, until 1904 when the Punchard Trust no longer could contribute funds. The Andover Public Schools District would assume all expenses, and the school was renamed to Punchard High School.

=== Renovations and additions to Punchard ===
The property on Bartlet street would grow through the late 19th and 20th centuries into a sizable academic campus. As early as 1888, a grammar school (serving grades 5–8) was erected on an abutting property to 36 Bartlet St. The school was originally named the Center Grammar School, but was renamed less than a decade later in 1894 to the Stowe School in honor of Harriet Beecher Stowe, who resided in the town. In 1916, a new wing was added to Punchard and held additional educational space as well as offices for the Superintendent of schools. By 1934, renovations became necessary, so the 1871 Punchard building was demolished, making room for an auditorium, gymnasium, and Junior High School. Punchard school and the new Andover Junior High would function as separate schools, although at the same facility.

=== Move of Andover High School to Shawsheen Road ===
After almost a decade of service, Punchard High School was retired in 1958 upon the opening of a new Andover High School on Shawsheen Road, the property which is today West Middle School. Andover Junior High School continued to operate out of the building at 36 Bartlet Street. A decade later in 1968, Andover High School would move to a neighboring building which is where it remains to this day; the former building was repurposed for an additional junior high school in the town and was named West Junior High School. As a result, the junior high school on Bartlet street (Andover Junior High) was renamed to East Junior High School, in contrast.

=== 1982 renovations to Bartlet Street ===
Among the many schools that had been erected on the Bartlet Street campus, the Central elementary school – which would later be renamed to the Doherty school in 1972 to commemorate long serving school committee member Bill Doherty – was one of several town buildings that had shown significant age by the 1980s. By 1982, plans to renovate the educational campus were underway; the Stowe school, the Jackson school and a heating plant were razed. East Junior High School was repurposed for town and school administrative offices, and subsequently was closed. The old Doherty School was renovated and served as a replacement Junior High school, but kept the namesake and operated as Doherty Junior High School.

=== Change from junior high school to middle school ===
The junior high schools in Andover served grades 7-9 and the Senior High School facilitated grades 10-12 until 1988 when the town restructured their educational stage structure from a junior high system to a Middle school system. Andover students would attend elementary school until 5th grade, and would then attend middle school for grades 6 through 8. The senior high school facilitated pupils for the remaining four years of their study until graduation from the public school system after grade 12. As a result, the two junior high schools in the district (Doherty and West) were renamed respectively to Doherty Middle School and West Middle School, as they have remained to this day.

=== 21st-century additions ===
At the 1999 town meeting, Andover allocated $31.9 million to construct a new elementary and middle school. High Plain Elementary School and Wood Hill Middle school were built as a single building, but designed to operate as two separate educational institutions. By 2002, the schools opened with construction being 97% complete by September 5 of that year. This brought the total number of elementary schools to five and total middle schools to three. By 2014, the structural integrity of Bancroft elementary school had become a burden to the Town of Andover, costing more than $1 million per year to maintain. As a result, the old school was demolished and a new one was built in its place. Bancroft Elementary remains the most recently constructed school in the town, despite controversy to renovate and rebuild other plants and facilities.

== Schools ==
=== Overview ===
Andover Schools
Preschool (PK)	Shawsheen
Elementary Schools (K-5):	Bancroft Henry C. Sanborn; High Plain; South; West (Elementary)
Middle Schools (6–8)	Doherty; West (Middle); Wood Hill
High School (9–12)	Andover High School

=== Shawsheen Preschool ===
Shawsheen Preschool
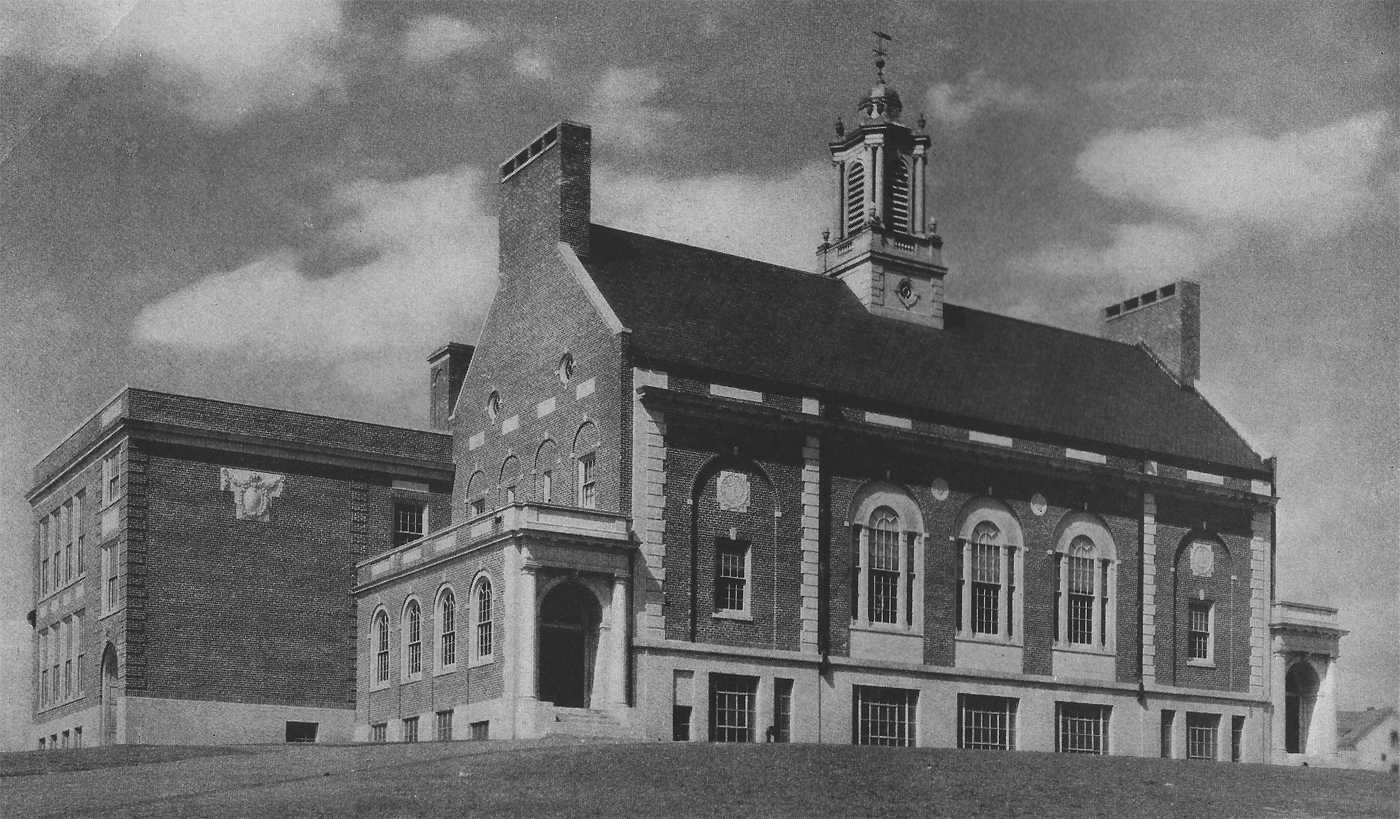

Location
- 18 Magnolia Ave; Andover, Massachusetts 01810

Information
- NCES District ID: 250195002366
- Principal: Carol Green
- Grades: PK
- Enrollment: 66
- Student to teacher ratio: 8.25 to 1 (FTE)

The Shawsheen School is the only school under the jurisdiction of Andover Public Schools that facilitates a Pre-kindergarten program. Although the school is considered public, tuition is subsidized by families, with rates ranging from $2,350 to $5,265 per year (for 2019–2020).

"The school opened in October 1924 after considerable cost overruns. It contained 12 classrooms, a magnificent auditorium with vaulted ceiling aligned along the front facade of the building. A combined gymnasium and cafeteria in the basement. The plan was presented with room for future classroom additions to the rear. This was later done in 1956 with the WWII baby boom impacting Andover to the point that five new schools and two additions were needed in 10 years from 1952–1962... In 1980 Shawsheen closed and the school department moved their offices into the building from the old Stowe School. After the conversion of the former East Jr. High building for Town and School offices Shawsheen School was renovated again reopening as an Early Childhood Center. The first renovation to the building in the 1970's included created the loft area above the auditorium for a media and library center."

— Andover Historic Preservation Commission

=== Andover High School ===
Andover High School is the sole public senior high school in the Andover Public Schools district. Formerly the Punchard Free School, the school produces approximately 450 graduates each year, which is 96% of the total enrolled senior class. Most notably, alumni of Andover High School include actor Michael Chiklis, comedian Jay Leno and professional golfer Rob Oppenheim.

== District Demographics ==
Per Massachusetts Department of Elementary and Secondary Education annual statistics for the 2022–2023 academic year, the Andover Public Schools district accommodates 5,487 pupils from grades PK-12, with an additional 39 Special education students beyond the 12th grade, totaling 5,526 overall.

Enrollment by Race/Ethnicity (2024―25)
Race	Enrolled Pupils*	% of District
African American	168	3.1%
Asian	1,023	18.9%
Hispanic	541	10.0%
Native American	5	0.1%
White	3,395	62.7%
Native Hawaiian, Pacific Islander	5	0.1%
Multi-Race, Non-Hispanic	276	5.1%
Total	5,414	100%

* Approximate number of enrolled pupils is calculated based on total number of students in district, multiplied by reported percentage, and rounded to nearest whole student.

Enrollment by gender (2024―25)
Gender	Enrolled pupils	Percentage
Female	2,597	47.97%
Male	2,812	51.94%
Non-binary	5	0.09%
Total	5,414	100%

Enrollment by Grade (2024–2025)
School	PK	K	1	2	3	4	5	6	7	8	9	10	11	12	SP*	Total
Andover High	—	—	—	—	—	—	—	—	—	—	396	402	414	397	0	1,609
Bancroft Elementary	—	85	81	89	91	84	92	—	—	—	—	—	—	—	—	522
Doherty Middle	—	—	—	—	—	—	—	175	165	153	—	—	—	—	—	493
Henry C. Sanborn Elementary	—	60	42	63	58	60	49	—	—	—	—	—	—	—	—	332
High Plain Elementary	—	67	90	75	89	97	87	—	—	—	—	—	—	—	—	505
Shawsheen Preschool	85	—	—	—	—	—	—	—	—	—	—	—	—	—	—	85
South Elementary	—	69	69	66	77	78	79	—	—	—	—	—	—	—	—	438
West Elementary	—	107	87	110	105	101	95	—	—	—	—	—	—	—	—	605
West Middle	—	—	—	—	—	—	—	177	154	177	—	—	—	—	—	508
Wood Hill Middle	—	—	—	—	—	—	—	119	102	96	—	—	—	—	—	317
District Total	85	388	369	403	420	420	402	471	421	426	396	402	414	397	39	5,414

== See also ==
- Andover High School (Massachusetts)
- Andover, Massachusetts
- Greater Lawrence Technical School
- Phillips Academy
