= SouthField, Massachusetts (development) =

Coordinates: 42°06′05″N 73°13′58″W

SouthField is a form-based code planned community located on the former South Weymouth Naval Air Station in South Weymouth, Massachusetts. It is a 1,400-acre (6 km^{2}) site 12 miles (19 km) south of Boston that overlaps three towns: Weymouth, Abington, and Rockland. Developed by LNR Property Corporation, SouthField will contain 2,855 housing units and up to 2,000,000 square feet (186,000 m^{2}) that include single-family homes, apartments, and townhouses. The site will also have up to 1.7 million square feet of commercial development, a 45-acre recreational facility, an 18-hole golf course, walking trails and 1,000 acres of undeveloped land.

The project encompasses the pre-existing South Weymouth South MBTA station (Old Colony Purple Line) and includes a new 3.5 mile parkway which will connect Route 18 with Route 3. Governor Deval Patrick has committed $42.5 million in a 30-year bond bill that includes $15 million in federal stimulus money to go with $8 million in previous federal aid.

New residents began moving into SouthField's first neighborhood, SouthField Highlands in 2011. The Highlands comprises four distinct (and different) residential options: The Commons (apartments), The Meadows (townhomes and single-family homes), Parkview Village (townhomes and single-family homes) and Fairing Way (55+ apartment living). The SouthField Form-Based Code community is only 12 miles south of Boston.

== Planning background ==
=== Form-Based Code history and description ===
Form-Based Code is an alternative zoning technique that uses local regulations and as a method of regulating development to achieve a specific urban form. It has replaced Euclidean Zoning in many new developed communities. The "SmartCode" model is a version of Form-based code that was developed by leading new-urbanist planner Andres Duany. These model of zoning codes are regulatory documents that prescribe a fundamentally different vision of how development should occur. They focus more on the form of development rather than the use. Form-Based Codes use a larger neighborhood perspective to determine the mass of buildings, their design elements, connection between sites, and their relationship to the public realm. Across the state, most zoning and subdivision regulations actually promote the sprawling development patterns that citizens generally oppose. One reason why many communities implement form-bases codes are to reduce the future impacts of urban sprawl. Form-based codes offer an opportunity to fix a city or town's zoning and subdivision rules and regulations in order to promote streetscapes that activate the public realm through careful analysis and planning. Form-based code specify what type of development a community desires versus conventional zoning which often results in development a community does not want. Form-based codes are not mere guidelines but regulatory standards to follow Another community that has used form-based codes in Massachusetts is Lowell, Massachusetts

=== Key elements ===
Regulating Plan, A regulating plan or map of the designated planning area that shows the locations where different building form standards apply, based on clear community intentions regarding the physical character of the area being coded.

Building Form Standards, Building Form Standards control the configuration, features and functions (such as height, massing, setback, parking and use) of buildings that define and shape the public realm.

Public Space Standards, These standards set specifications for the elements within the public realm such as sidewalks, travel lanes, street trees, street furniture, bike lanes and utilities.

Streetscape Standards, The primary purpose of streetscape standards are to enhance the public realm through physical improvements and provide clear standards for urban infill development via the Form-based code.

Architectural Design Standards, These regulations control external architectural materials and quality. Importantly, they do not usually dictate architectural style, but rather address design on a number of broader levels to establish a matrix of standards and guidelines that will allow projects to develop over time in a consistent scale and character.

Sign Standards, As with all well-crafted Form-based codes, the purpose of sign standards is not uniformity, but elimination of those elements that result in a cluttered and unattractive physical environment.

=== Benefits ===
The use of form-based codes, like many other smart growth tools, saves money for both developers and municipalities by streamlining the permitting process. It also protects neighborhood property values and offers a unique opportunity for municipalities to obtain the significant financial benefits of high-quality, higher-density developments. Studies have demonstrated that well-designed developments create superior property values than conventional developments with the same type of housing. This increase in value is the direct result of enhanced site amenities including uniform and consistent design standards, site layout, views, and preservation of existing cultural and historic resources.

=== Disadvantages ===
Some disadvantages include the lack of standardization, relative newness of the tool, the perceived support of an urban agenda, and possible gentrification. Until form-based codes become a more common practice across Massachusetts, inexperienced planners and urban designers must investigate form-based codes through a process of trial and error. Further, because of the relative newness and unconventionality associated with form-based codes, developers, local government leaders, lending institutions and homeowners could prove resistant to such a dramatic change.

== Form-Based Code Regulating Plan ==
Village Center District: This district is located centrally within the Base and is characterized by New England traditional neighborhood design. This district is intended for mixed-use, containing the highest density of housing allowed in the bylaw, as well as office, commercial, and retail spaces such as convenience stores, restaurants and shops.

Main Street Overlay District: The purpose of this district is to ensure that first floor active uses (such as retail and restaurant uses) are located along the two (2) main streets of the Village Center District.

Mixed-Use Village District: The primary purpose of this district is to provide a mix of residential housing types with some neighborhood commercial uses, including retail and restaurants. The density of residential uses in the district is less than the Village Center District, with fewer commercial uses.

Residential District: This district serves to accommodate a lower density of housing types.

Shea Village Commercial District: This district is the commercial center of the Base.

Shea Village Transition Overlay District: The purpose of this district is to create an appropriate transition in the scale of buildings within ¼ mile of where this district meets the Village Center District.

Golf Course/Open Space District: The purpose of this district is to facilitate operation of a public golf course and associated uses, including a club house and golf-related retail operation, and other recreational uses. If, for any reason, the golf course is not built, the only other permitted uses for the district are open space and recreational uses.

Recreation District: This district is established to foster passive and active indoor and outdoor recreational uses on the Base and will house some institutional uses already existing and required within the Base.

Open Space-Corporation District: The primary purpose of this district is to encourage the preservation of large contiguous wetland areas and open space for park land, active and passive recreation, reservations, community gardens, rivers and streams, and similar uses.

Coast Guard District: This district is the area currently used by the United States Coast Guard for housing.
