= Clark High School =

There are several Clark High Schools:

- Anderson W. Clark Magnet High School, La Crescenta, California
- Ed W. Clark High School, Las Vegas, Nevada
- Clark Junior-Senior High School, Clark, South Dakota
- George Rogers Clark Jr./Sr. High School (Hammond, IN), Hammond, Indiana
- George Rogers Clark High School (Kentucky), Winchester, Kentucky
- Joseph S. Clark High School, New Orleans, Louisiana
- Clark School (Rowley, Massachusetts)
- Clark Montessori High School, Cincinnati, Ohio
- Clark High School, former high school that was outside Carnegie, Pennsylvania
- Clark High School (Plano, Texas)
- Sheldon Clark High School, Inez, Kentucky
- Tom C. Clark High School, San Antonio, Texas
- Michele Clark Magnet High School, Chicago, Illinois

== See also ==
- Clarke High School (disambiguation)
- Clark County High School (disambiguation)
