= Fiske House =

Historic house in Massachusetts, United States

- U.S. National Register of Historic Places
- U.S. Historic district – Contributing property
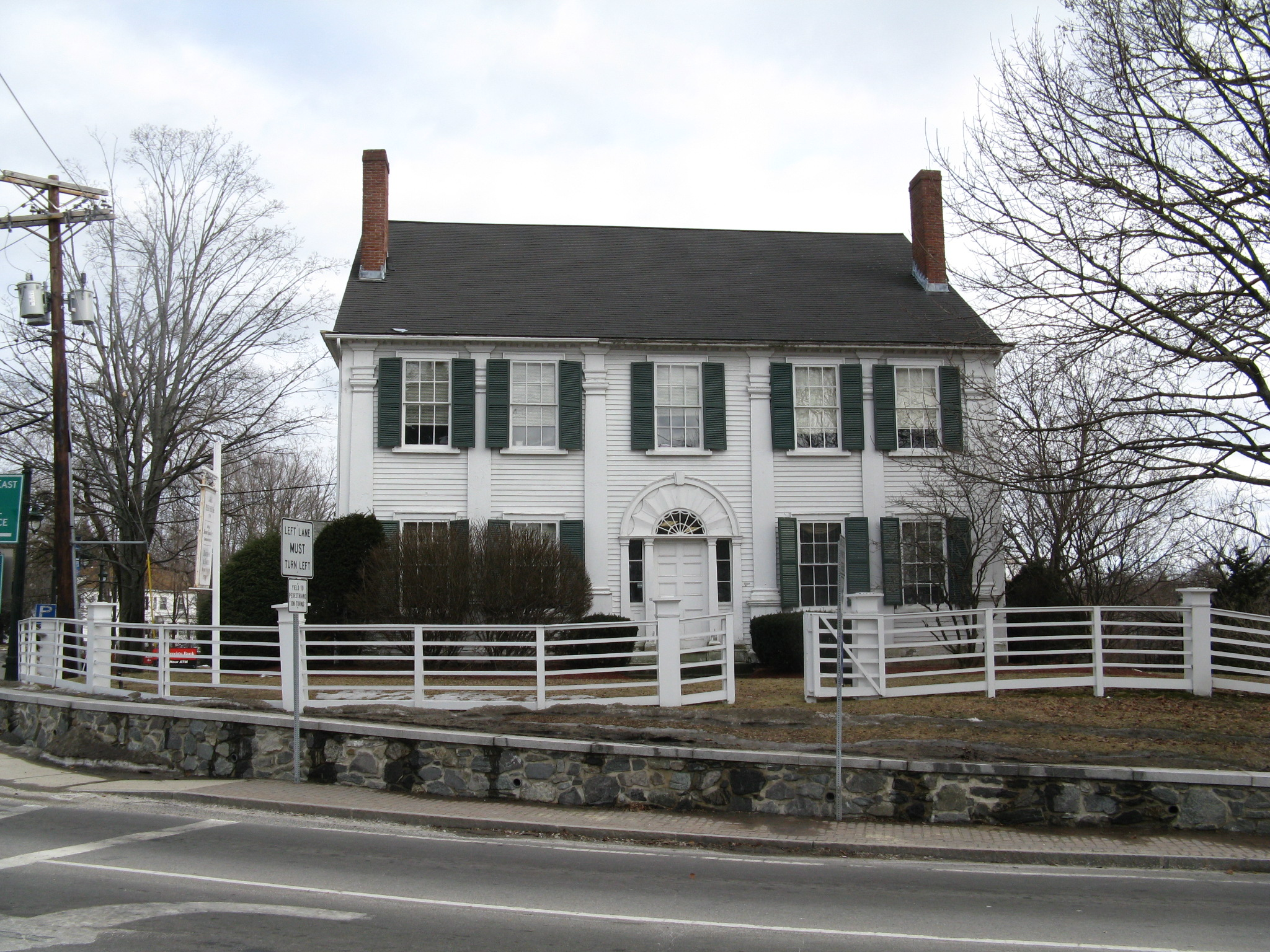
- Fiske House

- Location within Massachusetts
- Location: Chelmsford Center, Massachusetts
- Coordinates: 42°35′47″N 71°21′6″W
- Built: 1798
- Architect: Simeon Spalding Jr.
- Architectural style: Federal
- Part of: Chelmsford Center Historic District (ID80000646)
- NRHP reference No.: 77000171

Significant dates
- Added to NRHP: December 9, 1977
- Designated CP: February 20, 1980

The Fiske House is a historic house located at 1 Billerica Road in Chelmsford Center, Massachusetts, US.

== Description and history ==
The 2 1/2 story wood and brick house was built in 1798 by Simeon Spalding, Jr., a merchant, and occupies a prominent location in the town center. It is roughly square in shape, with brick end walls that include four chimneys. Its corners have pilasters, and its exterior doors have Federal style surrounds. The interior of the house has retained much original finish. Although the house was briefly out of the hands of Spalding's descendants in the 1830s, when it was operated as a tavern, John Minot Fiske, his grandson, purchased the house in 1839, and it has been in the family since.

The house was listed on the National Register of Historic Places in 1977, and was included in the Chelmsford Center Historic District in 1980.

== See also ==
- National Register of Historic Places listings in Middlesex County, Massachusetts
