= Myrtle Fahsbender =

American lighting expert

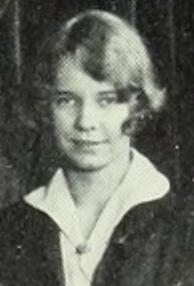
- Myrtle Fahsbender, from the 1928 yearbook of the University of Illinois
- Born: Myrtle Ernestine Fahsbender; 12 January 1907; Chicago, Illinois, U.S.
- Died: 1 May 2001 (aged 94); Freehold Township, New Jersey, U.S.
- Occupation: Lighting expert

Myrtle Ernestine Fahsbender (January 12, 1907 – May 1, 2001) was an American lighting expert. She was director of home lighting at Westinghouse Electric Corporation, where she worked from 1936 until 1970.

== Early life and education ==
Fahsbender was born in Chicago, the daughter of Ernest Fahsbender and Sophia Carlberg Fahsbender. Her father was a barber, born in Germany, and her mother was born in Sweden. She graduated from the University of Illinois in 1929, with further studies at the Moser Business College in Chicago. She was a member of Kappa Delta sorority.

== Career ==
Fahsbender began her career as a stenographer. By 1942, she was director of home lighting in the lamp division of Westinghouse Electric Corporation in New Jersey. She retired from Westinhouse in 1970.

Fahsbender gave talks and wrote articles about residential lighting, often aimed at women decorating or updating homes, or at professional decorators and landscape designers. For example, in 1939, she gave a lectures about the effects of blacklight on patterned fabrics. During World War II, she presented ideas for home blackout procedures at the Chicago Lighting Institute, and to audiences of air raid wardens. Also during the war, she wrote an instructional booklet with photographs, on repairing frayed electrical cords and changing fuses. She studied domestic lighting fashions in six European countries in 1951, and made a national lecture tour in 1956.

In 1948, Fahsbender was the first woman elected to a directorship in the Illuminating Engineering Society, and the second woman to be named a fellow of the society. In 1951, she was the first American woman delegate and presenter at the International Commission on Illumination, a gathering of lighting engineers in Stockholm. In 1963, she received the first Salute to Women in Electrical Living award, from the New York chapter of the Electrical Women's Round Table, and the New York State Department of Commerce.

== Publications ==
- "Keeping the Blackout Outside Your Home" (1942, pamphlet)
- Residential Lighting (1947, a textbook)
- "An Evaluation of Methods and Fixtures Used for Bathroom Mirror Lighting" (1947, with Beryle Priest)
- "Better See-Ability" (1952, booklet)
- "'Light' Work for Your Eyes" (1952)
- "The Forecast is a 'Light' Christmas" (1956)

== Personal life ==
Fahsbender was engaged to marry Ernest V. Goller in 1933. She died in 2001, at the age of 94, in Freehold Township, New Jersey.
