= Grace Fletcher Webster =

First wife of Daniel Webster

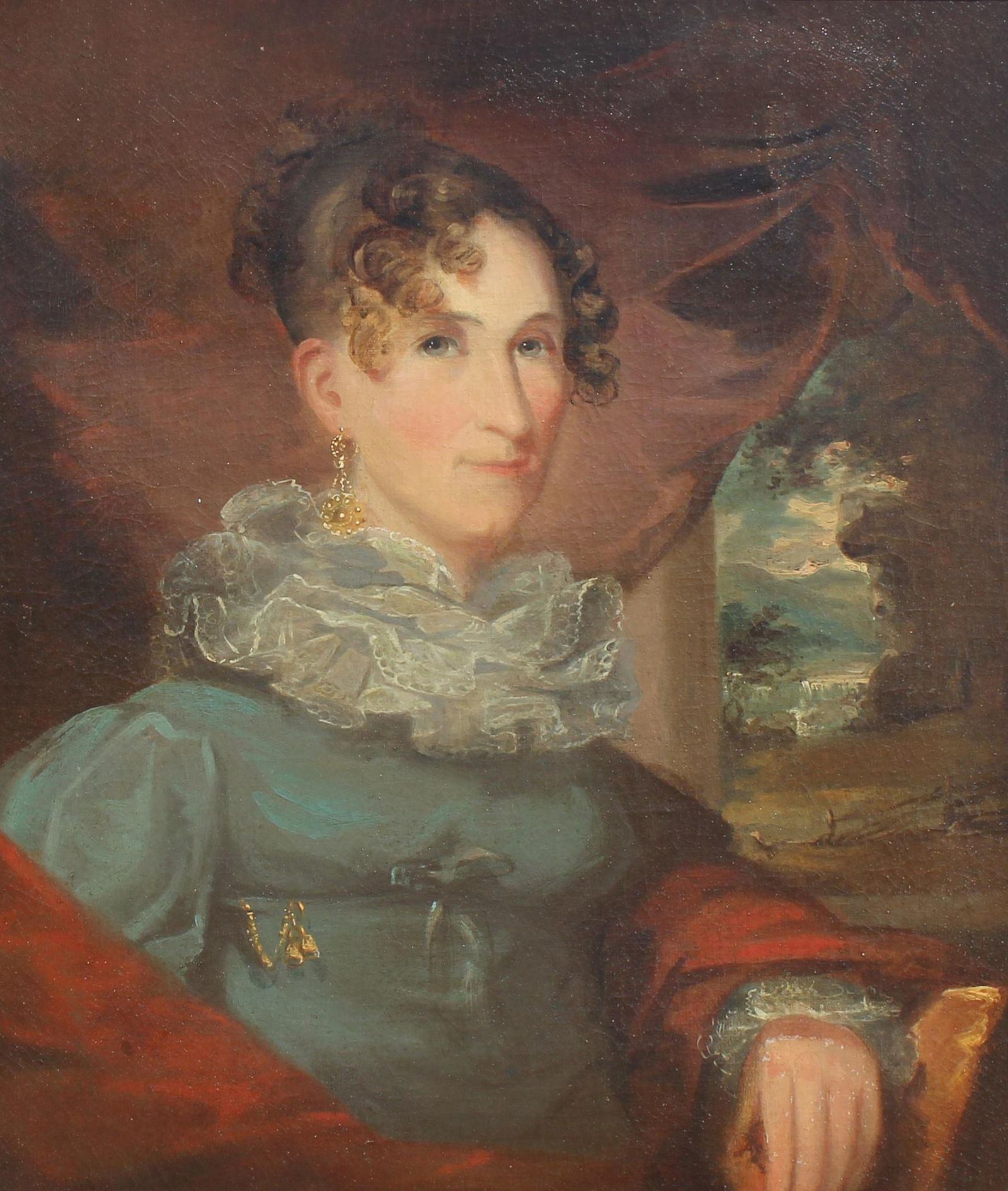
- Gilbert Stuart, Grace Fletcher Webster, c. 1816
- Born: Grace Fletcher; January 16, 1781; Hopkinton, New Hampshire, U.S.
- Died: January 21, 1828 (aged 47)
- Spouse: Daniel Webster (m. 1808)
- Children: Grace (1810–1817); Daniel Fletcher (1813–1862); Julia (1818–1848); Edward (1820–1848); Charles (1821–1824)
- Relatives: Bridget Richardson Fletcher (grandmother)

Grace (Fletcher) Webster (1781–1828) was the first wife of Daniel Webster. She was with him as he started his law career in Portsmouth, New Hampshire, and then sought to improve their lives by settling in Boston on Beacon Hill. Daniel, a successful attorney and statesman, was often away from his family for months at a time. Webster raised her five children, two of whom died in their childhood. She was particularly skilled at hosting both small, intimate dinner parties as well as large dinner receptions, like the one for Gilbert du Motier, Marquis de Lafayette.

== Early life ==
Born on January 16, 1781, at Hopkinton, New Hampshire, Grace was the daughter of Rev. Elijah Fletcher and Rebecca Chamberlain. She had two sisters—Bridget and Rebecca—and a brother Timothy. After Elijah's death, Rebecca married Rev. Christopher Paige.

She was educated in Atkinson, New Hampshire at the Atkinson Academy. She was a schoolteacher in towns near her birthplace, Boscawen and Salisbury. She was very religious, intelligent, and had a calm, dignified composure. While attending a church in Salisbury, Grace met Daniel Webster. She told her sister that she saw someone "who looked like he might be somebody." Daniel and Grace became friends, and they began writing letters to each other by 1804. To court her, Grace required Daniel to join the church. He joined the Salisbury Congregational Church on August 8, 1807. The marriage became imminent after Daniel moved to Portsmouth and he earned sufficient income to support them.

== Marriage and children ==
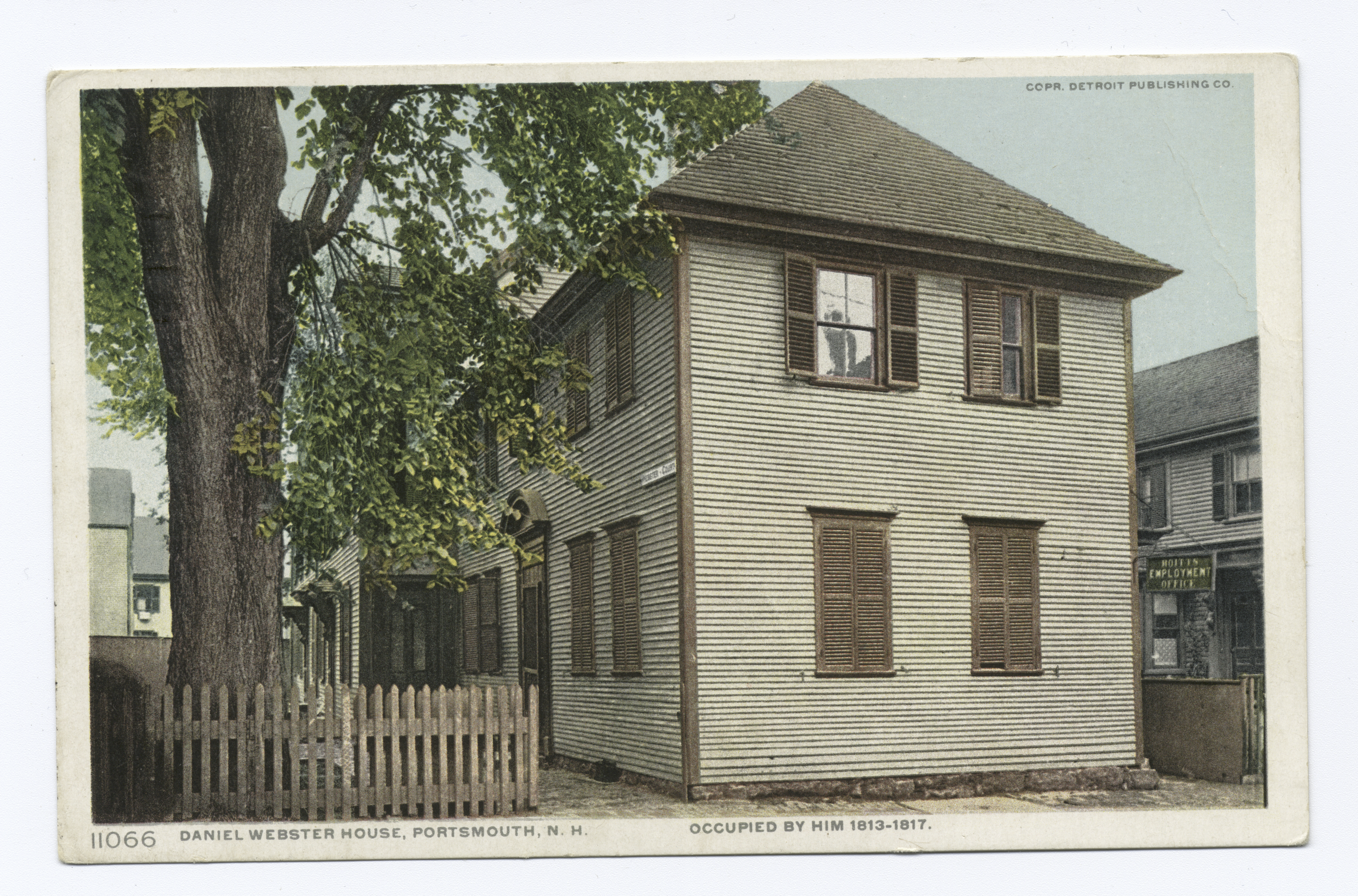
Daniel Webster House, Portsmouth, New Hampshire where Daniel and Grace Webster lived from 1813 to 1817

Grace married Daniel in Salisbury on May 24, 1808, becoming Grace Fletcher Webster. Webster and her husband were said to have "enjoyed an especially affectionate and companionable relationship. After living temporarily in a rented house, the couple moved into a two-story house in Portsmouth until 1813 when the house was burned down. The Webster's house was one of 108 houses and 272 buildings that burned down on December 22, 1813. Daniel was out of town, and Senator Jeremiah Mason's family took in Grace and their children. The Websters suffered financial losses. They had taken a mortgage out on the house, and it was uninsured. Daniel had benefactors who loaned him money occasionally. He became a successful lawyer and representative in the United States House of Representatives.

As Daniel settled into marriage and established his law practice, his poor health from his youth improved and he began to look hearty. Over the course of their marriage, they had five children, Grace (1810–1817), Daniel Fletcher (1813–1862), Julia (1818–1848), Edward (1820–1848), and Charles (1821–1824).

Around 1816, the Websters moved to Boston, where he had friends among the Boston elite and to make a new start after the deaths of close family members in New Hampshire. Daniel set up his law practice and the family moved into a house on Beacon Hill. At that time, they had two children, Grace and Daniel Fletcher (also known as Fletcher Webster). Webster and her husband were in Washington, D.C. when they learned that their daughter was very ill. They returned to Boston in time to be with Grace when she died of tuberculosis on January 23, 1817.

Daniel was often out of town for weeks and months at a time, litigating trials and pleading cases before the United States Supreme Court, writing regularly to stay in touch with his wife. In July 1821, Webster became depressed after the death of her mother. He was away when their son Charles was born. The Websters and two of their children, Julia and Edward, moved to Washington, D.C. in December 1823, as Daniel served as a representative in Congress. Friends in Boston took in Daniel Fletcher and Charles and Webster wrote regularly to Fletcher to let him know that she missed him and was thinking of him, and once to admonish him about his behavior. Webster and her husband spent New Year's Eve at the White House. When in Washington, she left a good impression of being a down-to-earth, attractive woman, of common sense. Webster became acquainted with leading political figures during dinners. She found herself to be impressed with Andrew Jackson after meeting him. Webster, preferring to be at home with her children, did not return to Washington, D.C. the following year. She was missed by Daniel and many people in the capital.

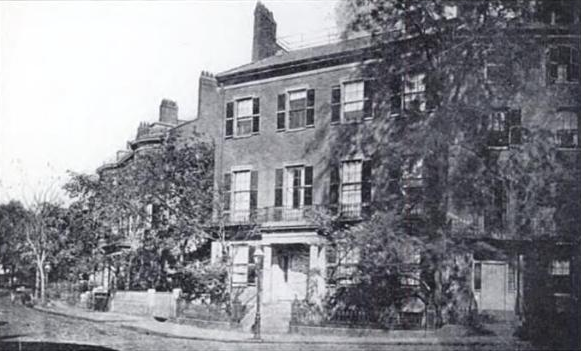
Daniel Webster House, Summer Street, Boston

In 1824, the Websters moved to a new three-story house on Summer Avenue, "one of the handsomest avenues in Boston". Webster hosted small, intimate parties, where she felt most at home, but was also successful in hosting in "magnificent surroundings". Israel Thorndike, whose property adjoined the Webster's residence, created a path through the wall that separated their property so that people could be entertained at both houses. For instance, when Gilbert du Motier, Marquis de Lafayette visited Boston, Grace was the hostess for the combined Thorndike and Webster reception. The wife of British Naval officer Basil Hall, who could be hard to please, states that Webster held the most impressive dinners that she had seen in America.

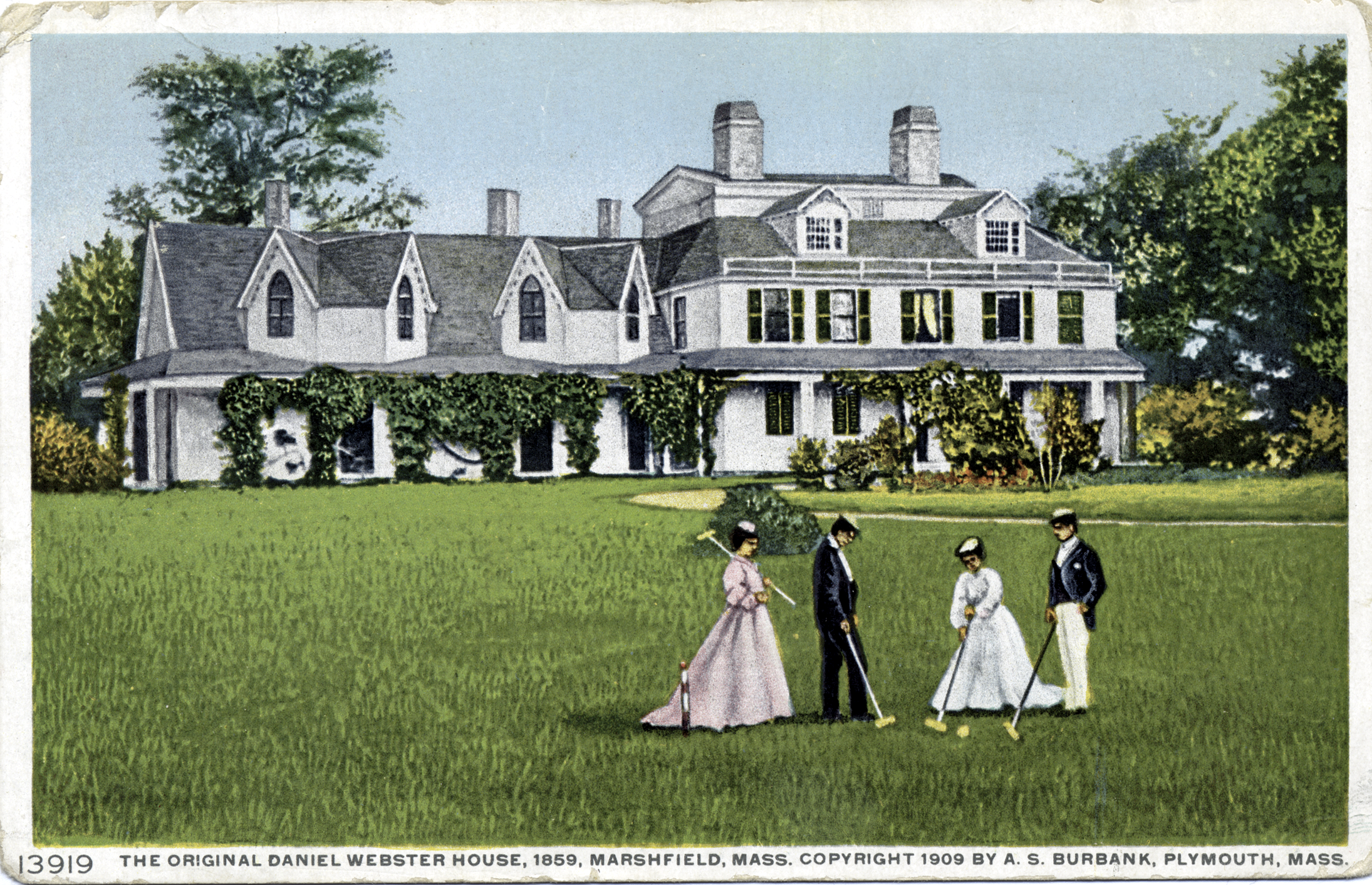
Thomas–Webster Estate in Marshfield, Massachusetts

Daniel visited Thomas Jefferson at Monticello in late 1824. While he was away, Webster's son Charles died on December 19, 1824, of tuberculosis, after which Webster was in a deep depression for months. She wrote a letter to Daniel, "I have lost the art [of] managing children..." on March 10, 1825. She also sorrowfully missing her husband. Beginning in 1825, the Websters stayed with Captain John Thomas and his family at their home (later named the Thomas–Webster Estate) near the ocean in Marshfield, Massachusetts. During the winter of 1825–1826, Webster, her husband, and their children stayed in Washington, D.C. Webster enjoyed being in the city with the entire family and made the most of her time there. Daniel was more content to have Webster with him, Josiah Quincy said that Daniel was in "his perfect symmetry" when he was with her. Webster was not her best without Daniel, too. In January 1827, she and the children stayed in Boston. Webster became fretful about their relationship and his changing religious leanings towards Unitarianism.

Daniel was elected to the Senate and Webster had decided to go with him to Washington, D.C. for the winter of 1827–1828. During their trip from Massachusetts to the capitol, she became seriously ill while stopping in New York City. Daniel left for Washington and returned two weeks later to stay by her side. Webster died in New York City on January 21, 1828, of a tumor in her lungs, or tubercular lesion. She was buried in an underground crypt in Boston and the remains of her daughter Grace and son Charles were reinterred beside her. In 1852, the remains of Webster, her daughter Grace, and Charles, and daughters of Fletcher Webster were moved from St. Paul's Cemetery in Boston and were reinterred in Marshfield.

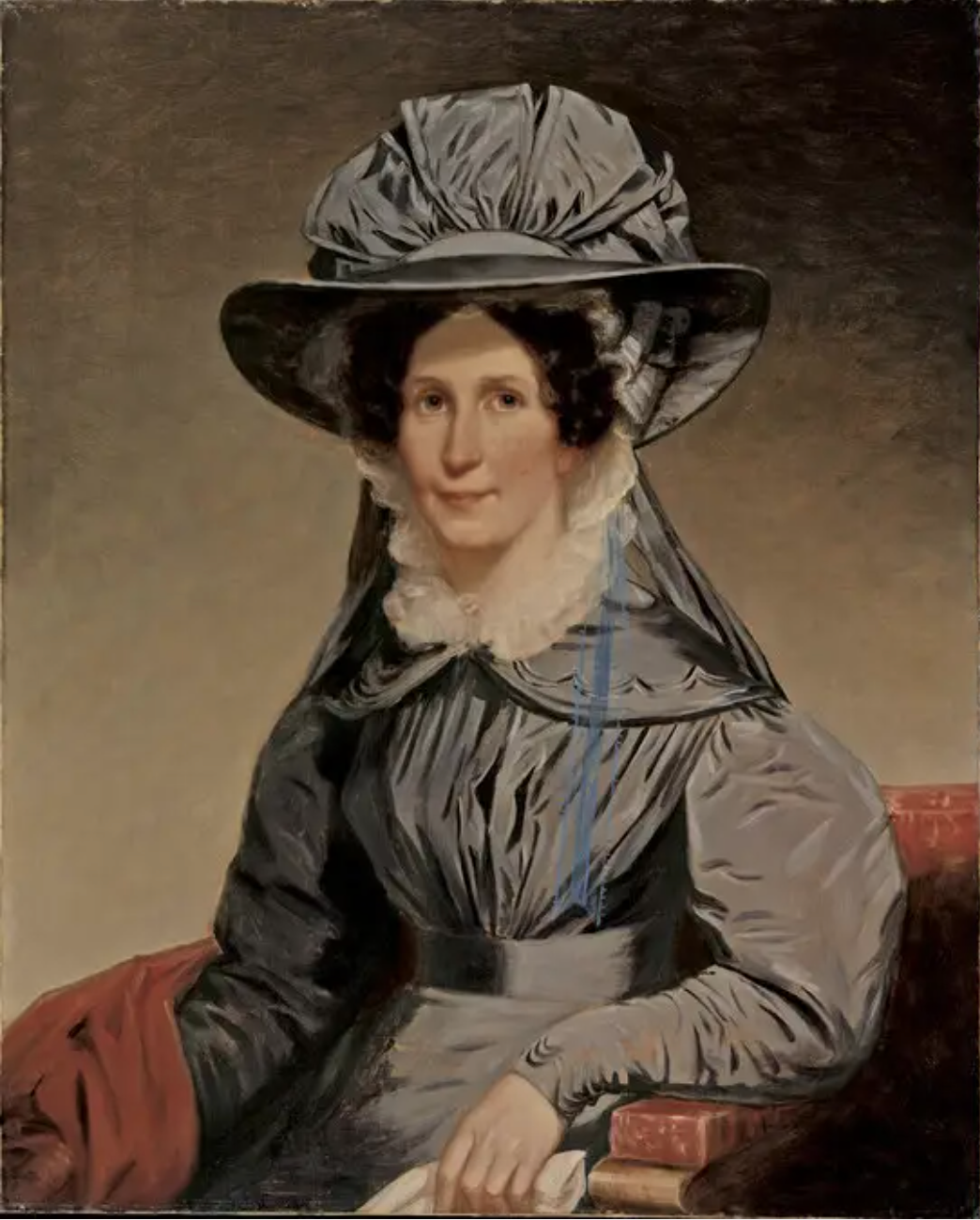
Chester Harding, Portrait of Grace Fletcher Webster, 1828, Hood Museum of Art, Dartmouth College

Mr. Webster retained to the end of his life an unfaltering devotion. He could never speak of his first wife without visible emotion. Grace Fletcher Webster was a person of very delicate organization, both physically and intellectually, yet she was energetic, and when occasion required she exhibited a rare fortitude. To her husband's welfare she was entirely devoted; she presided over his household with peculiar grace and dignity, and really seemed to live for him. When he was at home she - sought his comfort and pleasure; when he was absent her thoughts, as her beautiful letters testify, were of him day and night. She wrote to him almost daily.

Her portrait was painted by Chester Harding around 1828. It is among the collection of the Hood Museum of Art, Dartmouth College. It was one of Stuart's most successful portraits. It reflects the day that Daniel spoke at the Bunker Hill Monument in 1825. In the portrait, she wears the dress that she wore on that day. Daniel then commissioned a portrait of himself that was completed by Harding. It is also among Dartmoth's collection.

== Sources ==
- Barlett, Irving H. (1978). "Daniel Webster". W. W. Norton & Company, Inc. pp. 86–87.
- Remini, Robert Vincent (1997). Daniel Webster: The Man and His Time. W. W. Norton & Company. p. 86. ISBN 978-0-393-04552-9.
