= Chelmsford, Massachusetts =

Town in Massachusetts, United States

- Town
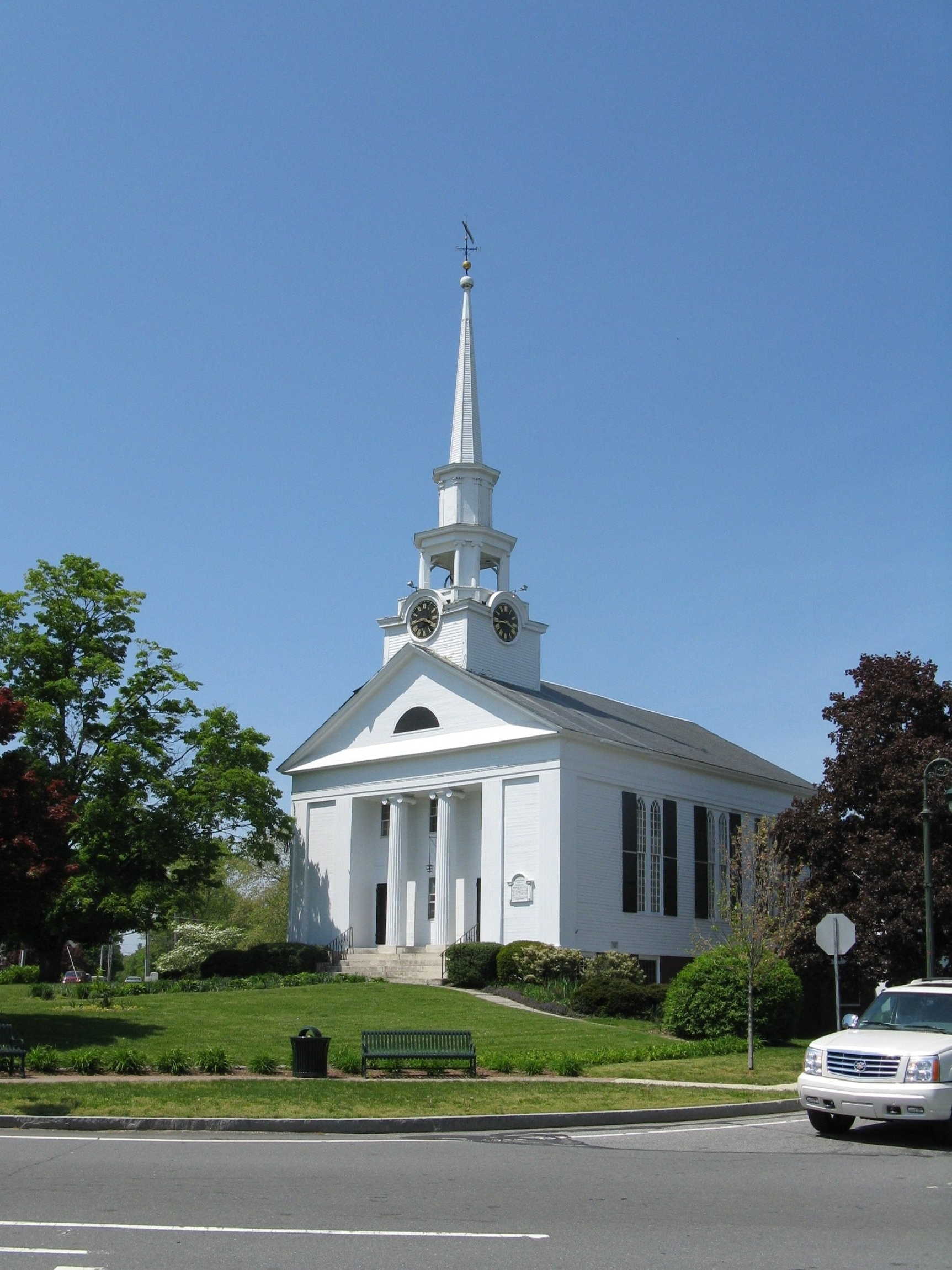
- First Parish Church

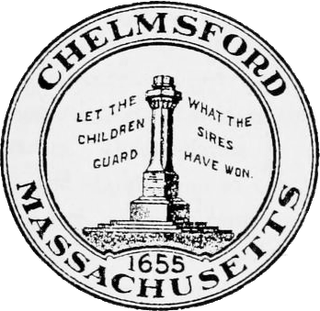
- Seal
- Motto: "Let the children guard what the sires have won."
- Location in Middlesex County in Massachusetts
- Coordinates: 42°35′59″N 71°22′04″W
- Country: United States
- State: Massachusetts
- County: Middlesex
- Region: New England
- English Settlement: 1652
- Incorporated: 1655
- Named for: Chelmsford, Essex

Government
  - Type: Representative town meeting
  - Select board: Pat Wotjas, Chair; Jeffrey A. Hardy, Vice Chair; David Boisvert, Clerk; Aaron Cunningham; Jon H. Kurland
  - Town manager: Alex Magee

Area
  - Total: 23.1 sq mi (59.8 km^{2})
  - Land: 22.4 sq mi (58.0 km^{2})
  - Water: 0.69 sq mi (1.8 km^{2})
- Elevation: 246 ft (75 m)

Population (2020)
  - Total: 36,392
  - Density: 1,625.9/sq mi (627.8/km^{2})
- Time zone: UTC−5 (Eastern)
  - Summer (DST): UTC−4 (Eastern)
- ZIP Codes: 01824 (Chelmsford); 01863 (North Chelmsford)
- Area code: 351/978
- FIPS code: 25-017-13135
- GNIS feature ID: 0618220
- Website: www.chelmsfordma.gov

Chelmsford (/ˈtʃɛlmsfərd/) is a town in Middlesex County, Massachusetts, United States.

Chelmsford was incorporated in May 1655 by an act of the Massachusetts General Court. When Chelmsford was incorporated, its local economy was fueled by lumber mills, limestone quarries, and kilns. In the 1700s, the Chelmsford militia played a role in the American Revolution at the Battle of Lexington and Concord and the Battle of Bunker Hill. The farming community of East Chelmsford was incorporated as Lowell in the 1820s; over the next decades it would go on to become one of the first large-scale factory towns in the United States because of its early role in the country's Industrial Revolution. Chelmsford experienced a drastic increase in population between 1950 and 1970, coinciding with the connection of U.S. Route 3 in Lowell to Massachusetts Route 128 in the 1950s and the extension of U.S. Route 3 from Chelmsford to New Hampshire in the 1960s.

Chelmsford has a representative town meeting form of government. The town has one public high school—Chelmsford High School, which was ranked among the top 500 schools in the nation in 2015—as well as two middle schools, and four elementary schools. The charter middle school started in Chelmsford became a regional charter school (Innovation Academy Charter School) covering grades 5 through 12, now located in Tyngsborough. Chelmsford high school age students also have the option of attending the Nashoba Valley Technical High School, located in Westford.

In 2011, Chelmsford was declared the 28th best place to live in the United States by Money magazine.

== History ==
=== Early colonization ===
The Pennacook inhabited the area for thousands of years prior to European colonization. Settler-colonizers from the adjacent communities of Woburn and Concord founded Chelmsford in 1652. An act of the Massachusetts General Court in the last week of May 1655 incorporated Chelmsford as a town; it was named after Chelmsford, England. The nearby communities of Groton and Billerica were incorporated at the same time. Chelmsford originally contained the neighboring town of Westford, as well as parts of Carlisle, Tyngsborough and a large part of Lowell (formerly known as East Chelmsford).

Successive Pennacook leaders Passaconaway and Wonalancet strove to maintain a friendship with the European settler-colonizers who founded Chelmsford within their territory. Despite this determinedly pro-peace stance, Chelmsford settlers became increasingly violent towards the tribe, often forcing the Pennacook to flee north temporarily or permanently. On one notable occasion, a handful of Pennacook who were too sick or elderly to flee with their kin remained behind and Chelmsford settlers burnt them alive in their dwelling. Eventually most Pennacook refugees permanently moved north to join relations in Odanak, but their descendants among the Abenaki First Nation and other tribes of the Wabanaki Confederacy continue to view Chelmsford as part of their ancestral and unceded homeland.

Several women of Chelmsford were suspected of being witches, such as Sarah (Hildreth) Byam and Martha Sparks. In 1691, Martha was held in the Boston Gaol for witchcraft, appeared in court, but was eventually set free after about a month. Some relate her freedom to the influence of the Chelmsford minister.

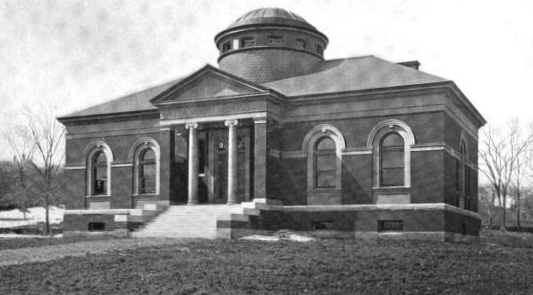
Chelmsford Public Library, 1899

In 1722 Chelmsford had imposed a fine for keeping strangers in town for more than 30 days. This was used for racial, religious, and political discrimination, as well as to keep out witchcraft. This practice and similar ones occurred until the Act of Settlement of 1793. Sarah (Hildreth) Byam was accused of being a witch under these circumstances.

The Chelmsford militia played a role in the American Revolution at the Battle of Lexington and Concord and the Battle of Bunker Hill. The town's own Lieutenant Colonel Moses Parker fought on the hill. He was wounded and captured, and died from his wounds on July 4, 1775. The Lieutenant Colonel Moses Parker Middle School honors his name, and the lobby displays a representation of the man. He is depicted in the John Trumbull painting The Death of General Warren at the Battle of Bunker's Hill, June 17, 1775 and in a painting in the Bunker Hill Museum. Captain Benjamin Walker of this town was also killed in this battle.

=== Later history ===
Ralph Waldo Emerson opened a school in Chelmsford in 1825, closing it after a few months to take over his brother's school in Roxbury.

Chelmsford's first school for the deaf was established in 1866, with a focus in oralism. There was a maximum capacity of eight students at a time. This pioneer school was eventually closed in order to make way for the formation of a larger deaf school in Rowley known as Clark School.

Both the Middlesex Canal and Middlesex Turnpike, major transportation routes, were built through Chelmsford in the first part of the 19th century.

Chelmsford was the birthplace of the Chelmsford Spring Co. in 1901, which later became the Chelmsford Ginger Ale Company, acquired by Canada Dry in 1928. The ginger ale plant, rebuilt in 1912 after a disastrous fire consumed the original plant, stood on Route 110 until its demolition in 1994. The Chelmsford brand of golden ginger ale continued to be manufactured by Canada Dry for decades. It is currently manufactured by Polar Beverages for DeMoulas/Market Basket supermarkets, based out of neighboring Tewksbury.

== Geography ==
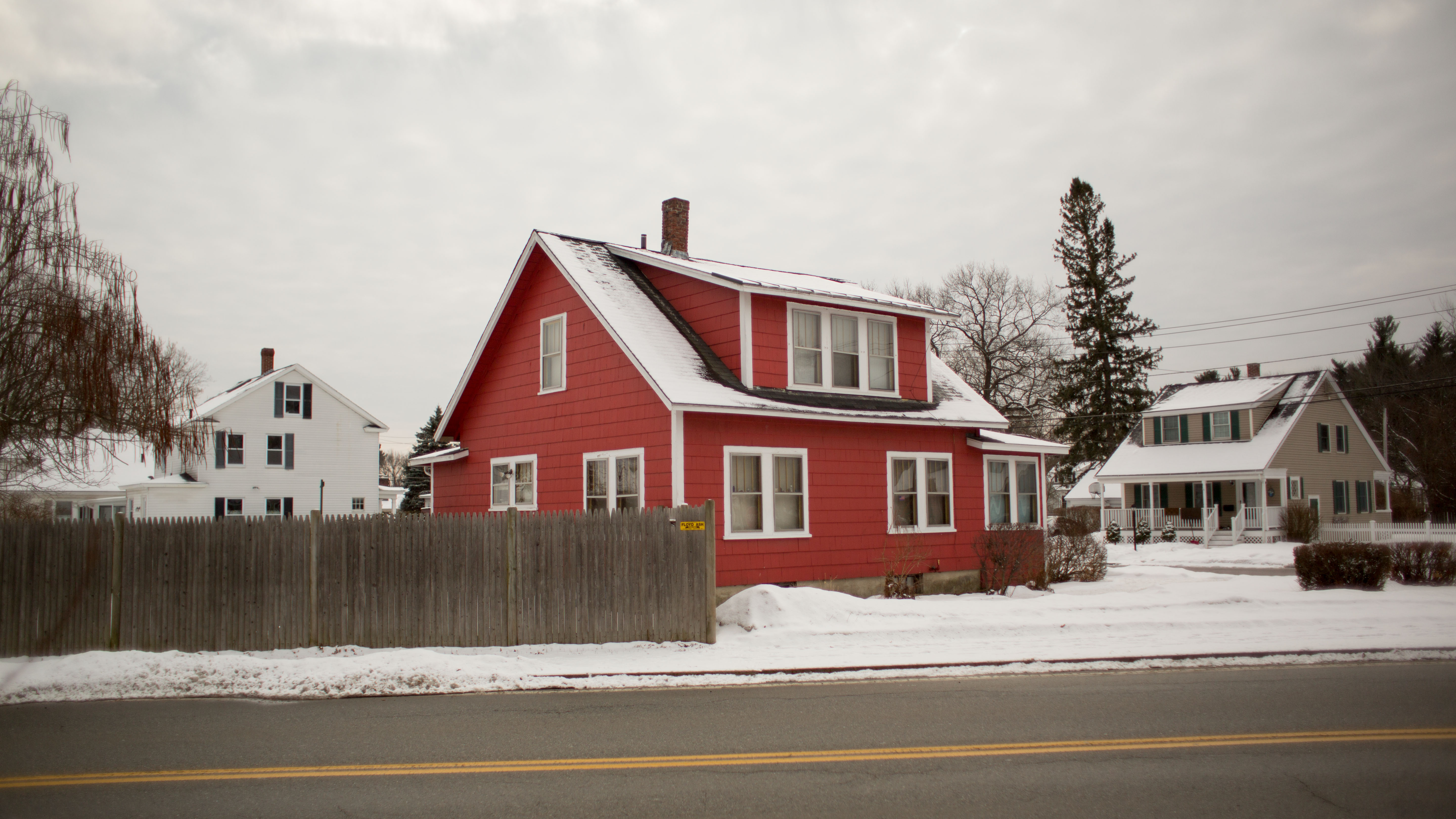
Typical houses in Chelmsford

Chelmsford is in northern Middlesex County, bordered by the city of Lowell to the northeast. It is 25 miles (40 km) northwest of downtown Boston and 15 miles (24 km) southeast of Nashua, New Hampshire. The town is bordered by two sizable rivers: the Merrimack River to the northeast, and the Concord River at the town's easternmost boundary.

According to the United States Census Bureau, the town has a total area of 23.1 square miles (60 km^{2}), of which 22.4 square miles (58 km^{2}) are land and 0.7 square miles (1.8 km^{2}), or 3.04%, are water.

Chelmsford consists of several neighborhoods. In addition to the town center, smaller areas include South Chelmsford, West Chelmsford, East Chelmsford, North Chelmsford and the Westlands. North Chelmsford, an industrial village, is distinct from the rest of the town to the extent that it has many of its own town services.

== Climate ==
Chelmsford, Massachusetts

Climate chart (precipitation, max. and min. temperature)
J	F	M	A	M	J	J	A	S	O	N	D
3.5 35 17	2.8 38 19	4.1 47 27	3.8 58 36	3.7 69 46	3.4 77 55	3.6 82 60	3.4 81 59	3.4 73 50	3.9 62 39	3.8 51 31	3.5 40 22
- █ Average max. and min. temperatures in °F
- █ Precipitation totals in inches
Metric conversion
J	F	M	A	M	J	J	A	S	O	N	D
90 2 −8	72 3 −7	103 8 −3	96 14 2	93 21 8	85 25 13	91 28 16	87 27 15	86 23 10	100 17 4	97 11 −1	90 4 −6
- █ Average max. and min. temperatures in °C
- █ Precipitation totals in mm

Like much of the rest of Massachusetts, Chelmsford has a humid continental climate according to the Köppen climate classification. Summers are typically warm and humid, while winters tend to be cold, windy, and snowy. The level of precipitation is roughly consistent throughout the year.

== Demographics ==
Historical population
Year	Pop.	±%
1790	1,144	—
1850	2,097	+83.3%
1860	2,291	+9.3%
1870	2,374	+3.6%
1880	2,553	+7.5%
1890	2,695	+5.6%
1900	3,984	+47.8%
1910	5,010	+25.8%
1920	5,682	+13.4%
1930	7,022	+23.6%
1940	8,077	+15.0%
1950	9,407	+16.5%
1960	15,130	+60.8%
1970	31,432	+107.7%
1980	31,174	−0.8%
1990	32,383	+3.9%
2000	33,858	+4.6%
2010	33,802	−0.2%
2020	36,392	+7.7%
2025*	38,549	+5.9%
* = population estimate. Source: United States census records and Population Estimates Program data.

As of the US census of 2010, there were 33,802 people, 13,313 households, and 9,328 families residing in the town. The racial makeup of the town was 88.6% White, 1.1% African American, 0.1% Native American, 8.4% Asian, 0.4% from other races, and 1.4% from two or more races. Hispanic or Latino people of any race were 2% of the population.

=== Crime ===
As of 2008, Chelmsford had a violent crime rate of 132 incidents per 100,000 people, compared to a rate of 449 in Massachusetts as a whole and 455 nationwide. The town had a property crime rate of 1,904 incidents per 100,000 people in 2008, compared to a rate of 2,400 for the state and 3,213 nationwide. Chelmsford has one police station located near McCarthy Middle School. The 25,000 square feet (2,300 m^{2}), $7.19-million dollar structure began operation in 2003.

== Government ==
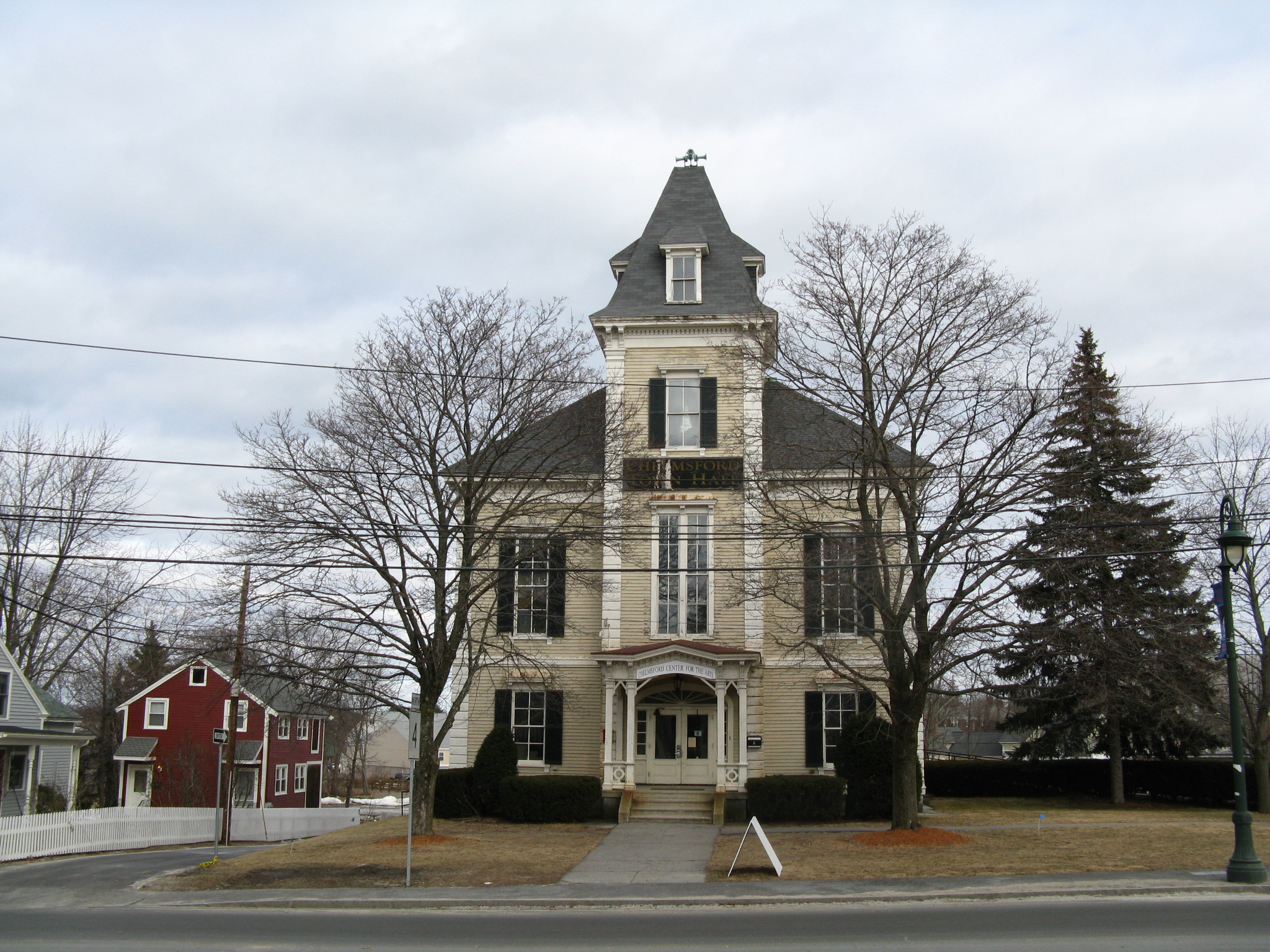
Old Town Hall, now the town's Center for the Arts

The town uses a representative town meeting model with a Select Board overseeing the operation of the town. From its incorporation until 1989, the town was governed by an open town meeting. Reporting to the Select Board are the town manager, town counsel, and town accountant. The town manager oversees the public employees and serves as chief executive officer. The current town manager is Alex Magee. Other elected boards include the Planning Board, School Committee, Library Trustees, Cemetery Commission, Board of Health, Sewer Commission and the Zoning Board of Appeals.

As of 2020 Chelmsford is represented in the Massachusetts Senate by Michael J. Barrett. The town sends four delegates to the Massachusetts House of Representatives, each of whom represent one or more of Chelmsford's nine precincts. Tami Gouveia is the state representative for precincts one and nine; Thomas Golden Jr., precincts two, three, and eight; James Arciero, precincts eight, five and seven; and Vanna Howard, precinct four.

The Fay A. Rotenberg School, a juvenile correctional facility for girls operated by the Robert F. Kennedy Children's Action Corps, Inc. on behalf of the Massachusetts Department of Youth Services, first opened in North Chelmsford in 1982; this facility had 16 beds. In 2006 the school moved to its current location in Westborough.

== Education ==
The Chelmsford Public Schools district serves students in pre-Kindergarten through twelfth grade. Data below are from Massachusetts Department of Elementary and Secondary Education (ESE); class sizes are for 2008–2009 school year.

Active schools
Name	Grades	Enrollment
Charles D. Harrington Elementary School	Pre-K–4	586
Byam Elementary School	K–4	536
Center Elementary School	K–4	521
South Row Elementary School	K–4	473
Col. Moses Parker Middle School	5–6	757
C. Edith McCarthy Middle School	7–8	947
Chelmsford High School	9–12	1412

Defunct schools
Name	Status
North School	Building burned down in 1981.
Westlands Elementary School	Closed due to budget cuts in 2008. Building repurposed as home for Chelmsford Community Education and Chelmsford Integrated Preschool ("CHIPS") programs.
George R. Quessy School	Building no longer standing.
Highland School	Interior rebuilt as residential.
McFarlane School	Interior rebuilt as residential.
Chelmsford High School (1st)	High school moved into new building. Building repurposed as Town Hall offices.
Chelmsford High School (2nd)	High school moved into new building in 1974. Building repurposed as C. Edith McCarthy Middle School.
Murdoch Middle Public Charter School	Became Innovation Academy Charter School and moved to new campus in Tyngsborough in 2008. Building repurposed as Middlesex Sheriff's Office Training Academy.

All expenditures considered, the Chelmsford public schools district spent $10,070 per pupil as of 2008, which was lower than the state average of $12,449. This was an increase of almost $400 from Chelmsford per-pupil spending in 2007. As of 2008 per-pupil allocation, $3,937 went to classroom and specialist teachers, $333 to administration, and $185 to instructional materials, equipment and technology.

In 2009, Chelmsford High School ranked 66th out of 150 public high schools considered by Boston Magazine. The ranking took into account many statistics associated with quality of education and academic performance, including the school's 14.5:1 student–teacher ratio. In the 2006–2007 school year, the average SAT scores for Chelmsford High School were 527 in the reading section, 519 in writing, and 535 in math. Chelmsford High School performed significantly better than the state average in the English, math and science portions of the 2009 Grade 10 MCAS tests, scoring 89, 87 and 77 out of 100, respectively.

== Historic places in Chelmsford ==
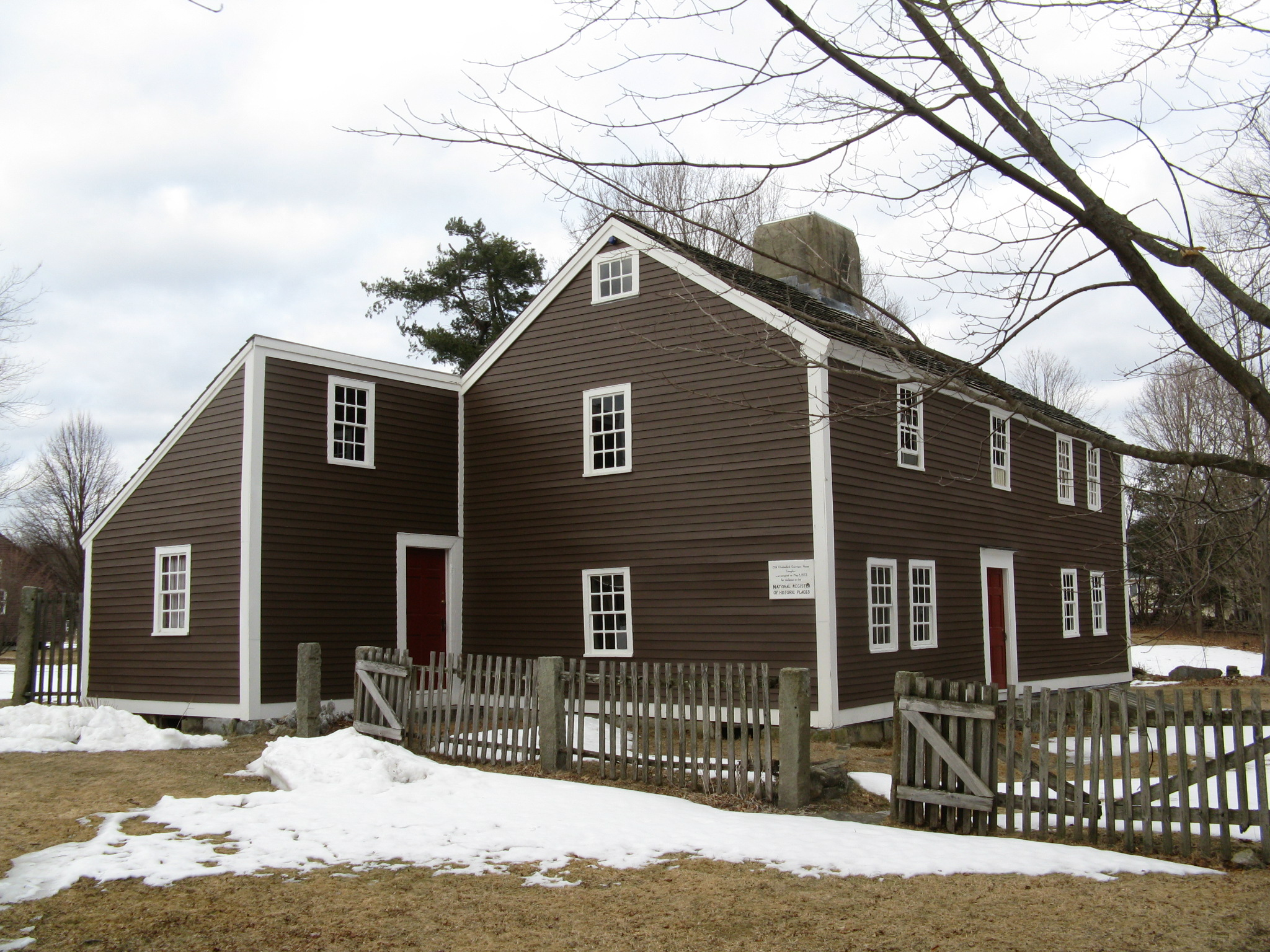
Old Chelmsford Garrison House

- Chelmsford Center Historic District
- Fiske House (1798)
- Hildreth-Robbins House (1742)
- Middlesex Canal (1802)
- Old Chelmsford Garrison House (1691), now a museum
- Oliver Hutchins House (1820)
- Barrett-Byam Homestead (1663), home of the Chelmsford Historical Society
- North Town Hall (1853)

== Transportation ==
Chelmsford is located at the intersection of the major US highways of I-495 and U.S. 3. Also found in Chelmsford are state routes 3A, 4, 27, 40, 110, and 129, making it a significant junction of roadways. The heart of the town center is Central Square—the junction of routes 4, 110, the end of 129, and Westford Street.

Chelmsford is home to the former Drum Hill Rotary. This rotary was the cause of many accidents that occurred due to its small overall size and ability for vehicles to gain speed. It formed the intersection of U.S. Route 3 (exit 32), Route 4, Drum Hill Road, and Westford Road. The rotary was demolished in 2003. It was replaced with a four intersection square with traffic lights, and is now called Drum Hill Square. This was part of a widening project for U.S. Route 3 between Interstate 95 (Route 128) and the New Hampshire state line.

Freight travels daily through Chelmsford over the tracks of the historic Stony Brook Railroad. The line currently serves as a major corridor of Pan Am Railways' District 3 which connects New Hampshire and Maine with western Massachusetts, Vermont, and New York.

The Bruce Freeman Rail Trail runs 6.8 miles (10.9 km) through Chelmsford, including the Central Square intersection.

The LRTA bus routes 15, 16 and 17 connect Chelmsford to the Lowell train station on the MBTA Commuter Rail Lowell Line.

== Notable people ==
- Josiah Gardner Abbott (1814–1891), born in Chelmsford, politician
- Keith Aucoin (born 1978), former NHL player
- Jeff Bauman (born 1986), author and Boston Marathon bombing survivor
- Phil Bourque (born 1962), former NHL player
- Gerry Callahan (born 1961), sports columnist and radio host
- Dawn Clements (1958–2018), artist
- George Condo (born 1957), painter
- Bill Cooke (born 1951), former NFL player
- Dan Curran (born 1976), former NFL player
- John Call Dalton (1825–1889) physiologist, born in Chelmsford
- Edward DeSaulnier (1921–1989), state legislator and judge
- Gururaj Deshpande, venture capitalist and entrepreneur
- Jack Eichel (born 1996), NHL player
- Bridget Richardson Fletcher (1726–1770), hymnwriter and poet
- Steve Hunt (born 1958), jazz pianist and composer
- Ulysses John "Tony" Lupien (1917–2004), Major League Baseball player and college baseball coach
- Jon Morris (born 1966), former NHL player
- Colleen Mullen (born 1980), college basketball coach and former player
- Sandra Newman (born 1965), writer
- Benjamin Pierce (1757–1839), born in Chelmsford, Governor of New Hampshire and the father of U.S. president Franklin Pierce
- Jeffrey Snover, Microsoft Technical Fellow and inventor of PowerShell
- Peter Torkildsen (born 1958), former chairman of the Massachusetts Republican Party and former congressman
- John Traphagan (born 1961), author and professor of religious studies and anthropology
- Lance Wilder (born 1968), animator and longtime background designer on The Simpsons,
- Kristen Wilson (born 1969), actress

== See also ==
- Heart Pond (Massachusetts) – Pond in Chelmsford, Massachusetts
