= Clarke High School =

Clarke High School may refer to:

- Clarke High School (Ontario), a school under the jurisdiction of the Kawartha Pine Ridge District School Board in Newcastle, Ontario
- W. Tresper Clarke High School, Westbury, New York
- Clarke Central High School, Athens, Georgia

== See also ==
- Clark High School (disambiguation)
- Clarke County High School (disambiguation)
