= Tew-Mac Airport =

Airport in Tewksbury, Massachusetts

Tew-Mac Airport (Closed)
- IATA: none; ICAO: none; FAA LID: B09

Summary
- Airport type: Closed
- Owner: Closed
- Location: Tewksbury, Massachusetts
- Coordinates: 42°35′32″N 71°12′16″W

Map
- Location of airport in Massachusetts

Tew Mac Airport (FAA LID: B09) was an airport in Tewksbury, Massachusetts. It was closed in 1997.

The airport was located off Route 38 in Tewksbury, MA near the border with Wilmington.

The airport was opened in 1951.

It was closed in 1997 and replaced with a golf course (now known as the Tewksbury Country Club) and condos.
