= Clarke County High School =

Clarke County High School may refer to:

- Clarke County High School (Alabama), in Grove Hill, Alabama, United States
- Clarke County High School (Berryville, Virginia), in Berryville, Virginia, United States

== See also ==
- Clark County High School (disambiguation)
- Clarke High School (disambiguation)
