= Chicago Lighting Institute =

The Chicago Lighting Institute was an educational and marketing association serving the lighting industry in the Midwest. The main aim of the institute was to acquaint architects, interior designers, electrical engineers, urban planners and the general public with the latest developments and applications in lighting. It was the first U.S. institution to promote appropriate use of light in the earlier years of the lighting industry.

== Establishment ==
In 1929—the fiftieth anniversary of Edison's invention of the electric light—leaders of the lighting industry in Chicago determined to found a lighting institute to foster the use of better light in homes, educational and service institutions, and industry. Because the lighting industry was no longer in its infancy, it was felt that the time had come to market the value of using optimum lighting conditions for work, study and leisure. Subsequently, the institute was established on April 11, 1930. The member companies provided the institute with the financial support needed to operate and maintain the necessary facilities where study and demonstrations could shape the future of a soon-to-be giant industry. The five corporate members of the Chicago Lighting Institute were the Commonwealth Edison Company, the Electric Association, the General Electric Company, Sylvania Electric Products, Inc., and Westinghouse Electric Corporation. The forty-six corporate association members in 1967 included:

- Advance Transformer Company
- Alkco Manufacturing Company
- American Concrete Corporation
- American Louver Company
- Appleton Electric Company
- Benjamin Products – Thomas Industries
- Corning Glass Works
- Crouse-Hinds Lighting, Inc.
- Curtis-Electro Lighting, Inc.
- Day-Brite Lighting-Div.
- Emerson Electric
- Framburg and Company
- Garcy Lighting
- Good Manufacturing Company
- Edwin F. Guth Company
- Halo Lighting, Inc
- Holophane Company, Inc.
- House-O-Lite Corporation
- Hub Electric Company
- Jefferson Electric Company
- Joslyn Manufacturing and Supply
- The Kirlin Company
- Koehler Lighting
- Lighting Products, Inc
- Line Material Ind.-Div. McGraw-Ed.
- Lithonia Lighting Products, Inc.
- Lumalite Products
- Luminous Ceilings, Inc.
- Major Equipment Company, Inc.
- Markstone Manufacturing Company
- Mason and Basedow Company
- Mitchell Lighting-Div. Compco Co.
- Modern Light and Equipment Co.
- Morris Kurtzon, Inc.
- Multi-Electric Manufacturing Co.
- Pfaff & Kendall
- Revere Electric Manufacturing Co.
- Shalda Lighting Products Co.
- Sinko Manufacturing and Tool Co.
- Smithcraft Corporation
- Solar Light Manufacturing Co.
- Steber Mfg-Div. Pyle-National Co.
- Steel City Fluorescent Maintenance Co.
- The Superior Electric Co.
- Universal Manufacturing Corporation
- Wheeler Reflector Company
- Wide Light Company
- Wonder J.A. Lighting, Division

The five members of the Board of Directors were executives appointed by the member companies. Six committees—executive, development, education, membership, property improvements and publicity—were staffed by associate member companies.

== History of locations ==
Over the course of the institute's history, it operated in four different locations, three of which were architecturally significant.

1. 20 N. Wacker Drive, Civic Opera Building (1930–1942). In 1930, the 36th floor of the Civic Opera Building was renovated to realize the objectives of the institute. The building was designed in 1929 by Graham, Anderson, Probst and White, and owned by Samuel Insull—a business magnate who also formed the Commonwealth Edison Company. The 45-story "skyscraper" had an art deco style and was formed in the shape of a huge armchair facing the Chicago River. It was also home to the Civic Opera, later the Chicago Lyric Opera. Employing 11,000 square feet, the institute's facilities on the 36th floor provided a theater/auditorium, a factory room, a lounge, a retail store, an outdoor lighting room, a school room, an office, and a six-room apartment used to display residential lighting effects. In 1942 a court order issued by Federal Judge William H. Holly, using condemnation proceedings, vacated the 36th floor for the use of the U.S. Army.

2. 72 N. Adams Street (1942–1946). During the remaining years of World War II, the Institute relocated to the first floor of the Commonwealth Edison Building. There it occupied 3,800 square feet devoted to exhibits and demonstrations of war-time lighting plus a limited display of fundamental lighting for use by school groups.

3. 37 S. Wabash Avenue (1946–1957). At the close of the war, the institute's Board decided to renovate the entire 12th floor of the Champlain Building—a structure that had been built by Holabird and Roche in 1903. In this same building, Illinois Institute of Technology offered its architecture classes supervised by department head, Mies van der Rohe. The institute's facilities offered a workshop, a photometric lab, a lighting clinic, an auditorium, a classroom, a large reception lobby and display along with several private offices and a conference room. The lobby's focus was two large etched panels on which were inscribed the biblical passage, "Truly the light is sweet and a pleasant thing it is to behold." The photometric laboratory, formerly at the Illinois Institute of Technology, was moved to the Chicago Lighting Institute.

4. 140 S. Dearborn Street, Marquette Building (1957–1968). In 1957, the Institute relocated to another even more famous 1894 building, again designed by Holabird and Roche. The Institute occupied half of the second floor off the dramatic central rotunda with its Tiffany glass mosaics portraying the travels of Pere Marquette. The remodeling of the second floor offered 8,790 square feet for a theater/auditorium, classroom, industrial room, library, general office spaces, conference room, director's office, as well as a lobby and display space. The central lobby faced a large etched-glass mural with the biblical passage, "Let there be light."

== Personnel ==
=== Administration ===
==== Ralph G. Raymond ====
Ralph G. Raymond was the first Managing Director of the institute, beginning in 1930. He resigned in 1938 to become supervisor of sales and promotion for Commonwealth Edison Co.

==== Carl W. Zersen ====
Since the founding of the institute, Carl W. Zersen was hired to work part-time as a lecturer for the classes conducted by the institute. In 1930, Zersen became the full-time Associate Director, responsible for directing the lectures, publicity and consulting activities of the institute. In 1938, Zersen became the Managing Director, and remained at the helm till he retired in 1968. During his tenure, the Institute developed a national and even international reputation. In these pioneering years that led from an initial emphasis on the use of better lighting to an era of all-electric buildings, Zersen came to be regarded throughout the industry in the United States as "Mr. Lighting."

Zersen served as a member and chair of various committees of the Chicago Section of the Illuminating Engineering Society (IES), and as Chairman of the Chicago Section in 1941 and 1942. At the national IES level, he served for three years as Chairman of the National Committee on Lighting Education (1946–48), and Chairman of the Joint Sub-Committee of Lighting Education with the U.S. Public Health Service (1948–49). He chaired the Committee on Lighting Education, which authored the Lighting Fundamentals Course (1947, rev. 1955 and 1961) that was used for twenty years as a textbook at the Institute and in a variety of educational settings throughout the United States. He served as the Chairman of the Board of Judges for three International Lighting Competitions sponsored by the National Electrical Manufacturer's Association (1947, 1947, and 1952). He also served as the Chairman of the Judging Committees for Lighting Competitions sponsored by the Electrical Construction and Maintenance Magazine (1953) and by McGraw-Hill Publications (1957).

Zersen was Chairman of the Milwaukee School of Engineering (MSOE) Industrial Advisory Committee for Illumination Technology for thirteen years and a member of the MSOE Corporation for eleven years. He gave hundreds of lectures to promote the use of better light at professional conferences and club meetings as well as on radio and television. For "Light's Diamond Jubilee" in 1954, he organized 72 speakers to give talks in 247 settings for a total attendance of 19,938 people, all to promote appreciation for the use of better light. In 1959, he was appointed to the United States National Committee of the Commission Internationale de l'Eclairage, composed of lighting experts from around the world. Zersen received the Distinguished Service Certificate from the National Electrical Manufacturers Association in 1952. In 1953 he became a Fellow of the Illuminating Engineering Society, which he had joined in 1928. He received an honorary Electrical Engineering degree from the Milwaukee School of Engineering on May 10, 1968. In 1971, he received the Distinguished Service Award from the Illuminating Engineering Society.

==== Robert Turek ====
Robert Turek was a lighting specialist with the Commonwealth Edison Company. He succeeded Zersen as the Managing Director in 1968 for a very short time as the Institute merged with the Chicago Electric Association later the same year and the emphasis on promoting better lighting gradually disappeared.

=== Employees ===
Among those who worked at the Chicago Lighting Institute as lighting professionals were Myrtle Fahsbender, Frederick H. Heintz, J.C. Newhouse, Joseph A. Tills, Harold Weibel, Don Ingersen, Kerr Sanders, Raymond Wozniak, Herman Sereika, Jim Burke, Bob Turek, Joseph Hofmann, William Maroney, Tom Koenig, Brian McCann, Myron Feldser and James Berg. In later years, the staff included Janice McGuirk, Edna Wilson, Dolores Kania, Barbara Zablocki and Clarence Perkins. Those serving as Presidents of the Board of Directors over the years included E.W.Lloyd, O.R. Hogue, R.G. Raymond, A.H.Meyer, G.K. Hardacre, D.P. Wood, O.A.Hill, F.H.Heintz, and R.J. Schulte.

== Notable accomplishments of the Institute ==
=== Coursed offered ===
Over the years, the Institute became a popular venue for those seeking to learn about the latest developments in what was at the time a cutting-edge industry. The annual attendance at lectures and presentations approached 75,000 people. Typical groups included University of Illinois and Notre Dame senior architectural students, Chicago Art Institute and Northwestern University classes in interior design, Illinois Society of Architects, Illinois College of Optometry, Illinois Institute of Technology and Milwaukee School of Engineering electrical engineering classes, and many civic groups, high school classes, women's clubs, and visitors from foreign countries.

Every year numerous courses were offered by the Institute for engineers, salesmen, architects, and builders. Some courses were repeated annually and others developed to address growing concerns or public interest. The courses typically had twelve two-hour sessions. Fifty students were the maximum that could be enrolled in a class. Some educational institutions gave college credit to their students who enrolled and completed the classes. Among the many courses offered were:

- Lighting System Maintenance
- Wiring Design
- Lighting Fundamentals
- Advanced Lighting Design
- Elements of "Heat with Light"
- Lighting for Residential Interiors
- Floodlighting
- Academy of Lighting Arts
- Industrial Lighting Workshop

By 1965, the institute was offering numerous courses for architects and contractors on the subject of heating with light and numerous high rise buildings were being constructed that were no longer heated by traditional means. Clinics were also regularly offered with titles like Lighting Today's Classroom, Golf Course Lighting, Lighting Design for Stores, Merchandising through Effective Lighting, Lighting the Funeral Home, and many others.

=== Practices introduced by the Institute ===
In an era when new practices of lighting were being pioneered, the institute was on the cutting edge of the potential hoped for by the corporate and associate members. The facilities of the Institute demonstrated the advantages and opportunities in better lighting for students, homemakers, as well as civic and business groups. The main lecture room was also a laboratory where many approaches to better lighting were demonstrated. The system employed 401 lamps and 152 circuits achieving foot candle levels from ½ to 1000. The ceiling and drapes could be illuminated with primary colors and combinations; the cove lighting system was equipped with fluorescent lamps plus incandescent down lights controlled by dimmers. The total lighting load was 52 kilowatts, or 52 watts per square foot. The classroom and industrial rooms could demonstrate suspended incandescent units and fluorescent, mercury vapor, sodium vapor, and sulfur lamps.

In 1930, a desk was lighted with 5 to 7 foot candles of light. In 1968, some 50 to 300 foot candles of light were employed. Pastel tones and light carpeting were also encouraged by the Institute staff to improve the interior visual environment. In 1940, clinics were held that attracted some 240–250 people per day from 13 states to explore the use of the new light source—the fluorescent tube—which had been introduced at the New York World's Fair in 1938–39. Fluorescent lighting was promoted as being twice as efficient as incandescent light.

The Institute advocated better street lighting in urban centers and on November 15, 1958, its Managing Director, Carl Zersen, narrated the pageant, "Light Through the Ages," with full orchestra, actors and soloists, at the conclusion of which President Eisenhower turned on the new State Street fluorescent lighting system that made it the brightest thoroughfare in the world. Four-hundred thousand people were present for the event. The new lights provided four times the illumination of the ones that had been installed 32 years earlier. In the same year, the development and acceptance of higher foot candles approved by the Illuminating Engineering Society made it possible for the industry to promote heat-by-light installations that by the 1970s became common in many downtown Chicago all-electric buildings.

On July 15, 1964, at the Wisconsin Club in Milwaukee, Carl Zersen used research that he had conducted with 100 leaders in industry and at American universities to recommend that the Milwaukee School of Engineering develop an illumination emphasis within the electrical engineering degree. The proposal was accepted and courses were integrated into the MSOE curriculum. Many other examples of the institute's impact would be seen in its work with supermarkets, churches, funeral homes, schools, hospitals, factories, department stores, and, as always, private homes. Countless thousands could claim that they renovated or restructured an environment with better illumination as a result of a visit to or from the Chicago Lighting Institute.

== End of service ==
In 1968—after 38 years of service—the Institute merged with the Chicago Electric Association when the leaders in the lighting industry no longer felt it necessary to maintain an educational institute to promote optimum lighting conditions because this task had largely been accomplished.
