= John James Nazarian =

American private investigator

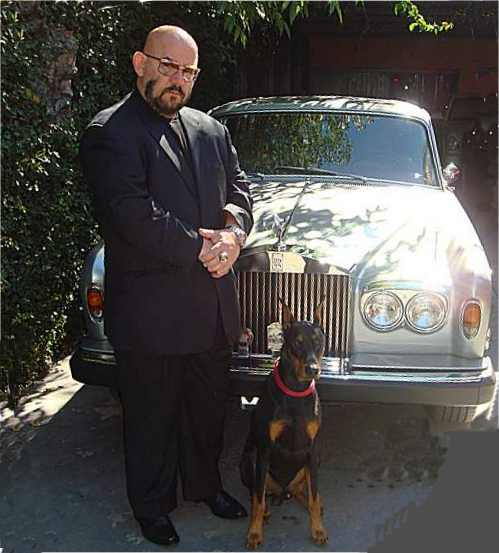
- John James Nazarian and his dog, 2009.
- Born: July 9, 1952 (age 74); Tewksbury, Massachusetts
- Occupation: Private Investigator
- Website: www.nazarianandassociates.com

John James Nazarian (born July 9, 1952), is an American private investigator and security expert with offices in Los Angeles, New York City, and Florida. Nazarian is best known as a celebrity guest commentator on crime- and divorce-related television programming, as well as making appearances in documentaries or docudramas in a reality or fictional setting.

== Biography ==
=== Early years ===
John James Nazarian was born July 9, 1952, in Tewksbury, Massachusetts. He moved to California at the age of 16. Nazarian graduated from William S. Hart High School in Newhall, California.

Nazarian entered the U.S. Navy right after high school for four years, leaving the service with an honorable discharge.

Nazarian attended the Los Angeles City College and received an AA degree in Police Science, after being discharged from the Navy. Nazarian received training during his law enforcement career. He also holds two degrees, one in Administration of Justice, and one in Criminology.

Upon returning from the Navy, Nazarian worked as an apprentice embalmer at several different mortuaries in California. He also worked as a heavy-equipment operator, and owned a lawn-care business.

=== Law enforcement career ===
While still in high school, Nazarian began his career in law enforcement as a student worker / Sheriff's Explorer under the tutelage of Sgt. Bob Warford and Deputy Arthur E. Pelino, Los Angeles County Sheriff’s Department, of the old Newhall Station.

In the '80s, Nazarian became a prison guard employed by the California Department of Corrections. He was assigned to the California Institution for Women in Frontera, California, the home to several members of the Manson family, including Susan Atkins, Patricia Krenwinkel and Leslie Van Houten. Nazarian was one of five people attending the September 9, 1981, marriage of Atkins.

Shortly after leaving the California Department of Corrections, Nazarian went to work for the San Francisco Sheriff's Department as a deputy sheriff. Nazarian worked for the police department of Mendota, California, where he worked with juveniles.

Nazarian left law enforcement, saying it was because; "All my friends who came on the department with me died of AIDS. It was a big part of the reason I left San Francisco. I lost all my friends when I was in my 30s."

=== Private investigator ===
Nazarian got his start as a private investigator working for the San Francisco Court system working on court-appointed cases at the nominal rate of just $27 an hour. Nazarian opened his first office in San Francisco with the help of Seymour Jaron. Nazarian credits attorney Gary Lieberman of San Francisco, who suggested Nazarian become a private investigator.

It did not take long for Nazarian to figure out the real money was in Beverly Hills. Following the money, John moved his office to Los Angeles. Armand Keosian provided Nazarian with an office with a view of a golf course in his Century City, Los Angeles Suite on the Avenue of the Stars. This was critical to Nazarian’s success in the early days of his practice. Sorrell Trope, sometimes referred to as the "dean of L.A. divorce lawyers," stated he uses only Nazarian due to his reliability and honesty, proclaiming of Nazarian, "he's legitimate."

The basic retainer fee for Nazarian and his team is said to run between $10,000 and $20,000. Nazarian's normal rate is purportedly $400 per hour plus expenses.

Nazarian's firm has handled case work on behalf of a number of high-profile clients, including boxer Oscar De La Hoya, actor Vin Diesel, writer Steven Bochco, television executive Les Moonves, and actress Pauley Perrette in her case against ex-husband, Coyote Shivers, to whom she was married for three years. She has been granted restraining orders against him since leaving him. Nazarian's client Andrea Thompson, star of NYPD Blue and 24, was involved in another high-profile stalking case. Nazarian was asked to use his San Francisco Police connections to help in the murder case of Gary Murphy

Nazarian was interviewed about the Gypsy Murders on CBS News and in the San Francisco Magazine. The disagreement between two private investigators, one being Nazarian was covered in the book by Jack Olsen.

Nazarian was in high demand during the Anthony Pellicano trial because many consider that Nazarian is the only other high-profile P. I. that has become rich and a celebrity in his own right by doing what he does. His insight on the fall from grace of Pellicano; the California Lawyers Magazine felt the case had such significance that the magazine did a full spread on the "Pellicano Effect" and featured Nazarian including a two-page photo spread of Nazarian. Nazarian also appeared in the German Magazine Der Spiegel discussing the guilty plea of John McTiernan a client of Pellicano in which he was photographed by Robert Gallagher as part of the six picture slide show which is part of the article.

Nazarian has been interviewed by numerous publications on high-profile cases or clients including Courtney Love

Others interviews in Print Media include the Britney Spears Divorce Nazarian was interviewed about his views in connection to the deaths of Anna Nicole Smith and her son Daniel Smith. In 2009, Nazarian was asked his take a year after the Tiger Woods scandal on Woods and other high-profile athletes who found themselves involved in allegations of cheating on spouses.

Since 1997 Nazarian has been sought for articles that addresses the use of private investigators in divorce and other high-profile court cases. With one article that dealt exclusively with Nazarian's views in the L. A. Times.

Nazarian has been primary in helping with the investigation of the case of the teen text murder of Mike Yepremyan in North Hollywood California in 2009. Nazarian has continued to work on what is known as the teen text murder through the arrests of the two alleged shooters of Mike Yepremyan in July 2011 and the indictments by a L. A. County grand jury in September 2011 of two for the alleged murder and two for conspiracy to commit murder.

=== Television career ===
Nazarian appeared as himself in the documentary Divorce Corp in 2014.

Nazarian appeared in a 2014 three part series on E! called Secret Societies of Hollywood.

In 2004 Nazarian portrayed himself in two episodes of Discovery Channel's American P.I., in which he walked through his take on both the O. J. Simpson and Son of Sam murder cases.

Nazarian also appeared in the movie Fracture as a Private Investigator named Dick.

John J. Nazarian covered the Anthony Pellicano trial in 2008 in the California federal court. He was interviewed on the NBC Today Show about the death of Michael Jackson investigation. and has made numerous appearances in regards to the Ronni Chasen murder.

Nazarian has appeared on the TV Show Extra. in regards to the disappearance of Olivia Newton-John's boyfriend, Patrick McDermott. Nazarian was interviewed by Rita Cosby in regards to the Extra investigation about McDermott. Nazarian was later interviewed by Nancy Grace when McDermott was allegedly found.

Nazarian has been interviewed for the French TV magazine 66 Minutes, the French version of the CBS television news magazine, 60 Minutes.

=== Personal life ===
John J. Nazarian and his family live in Toluca Lake, Los Angeles. Nazarian recently welcomed his first grandchild into the family. Nazarian welcomed his second grandson on October 9, 2011.

Nazarian started an online talk radio show on August 21, 2011.
