= Tewksbury, Massachusetts =

- Town
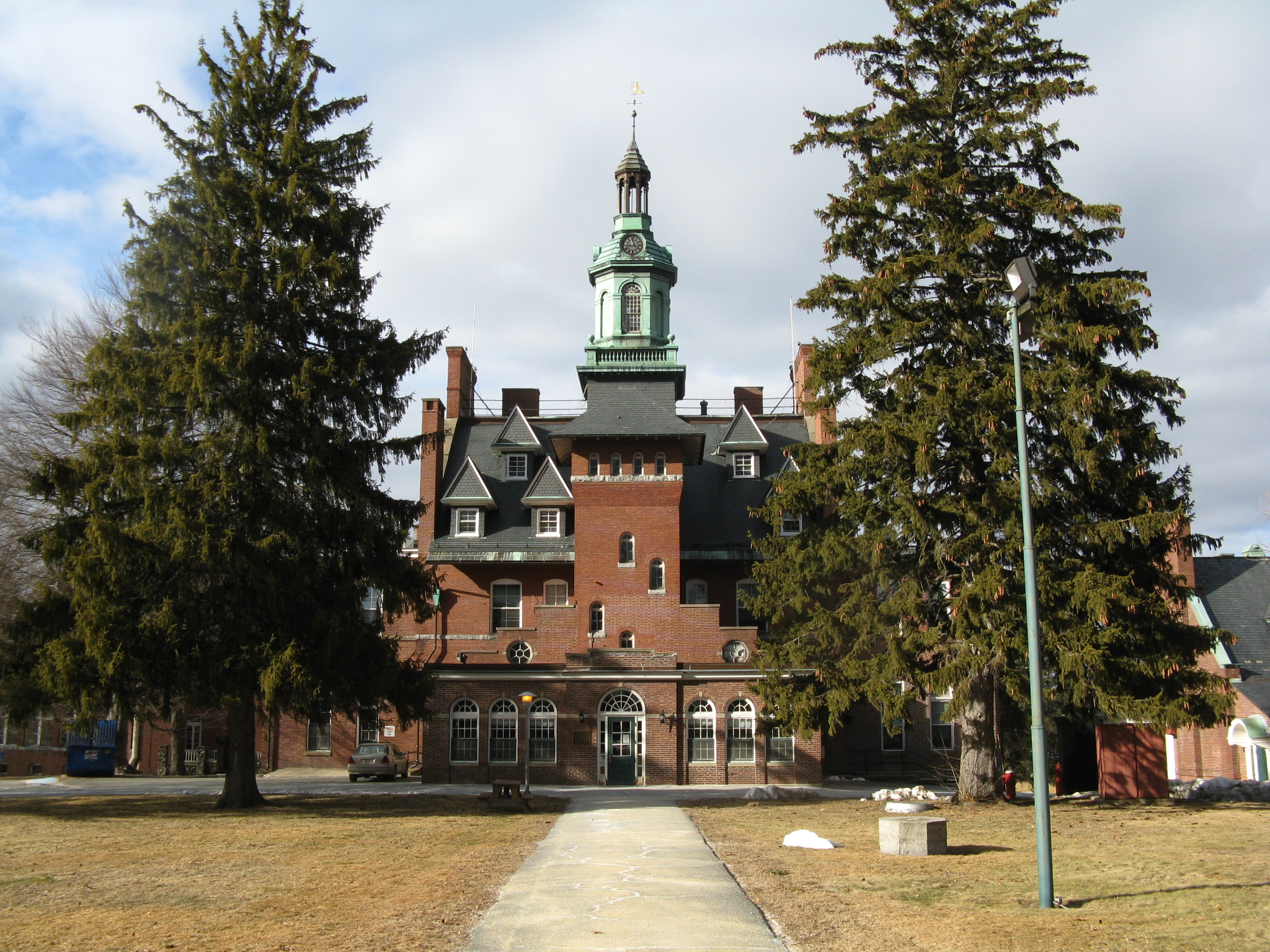
- Tewksbury Hospital, Old Administration Building

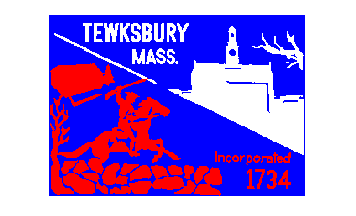
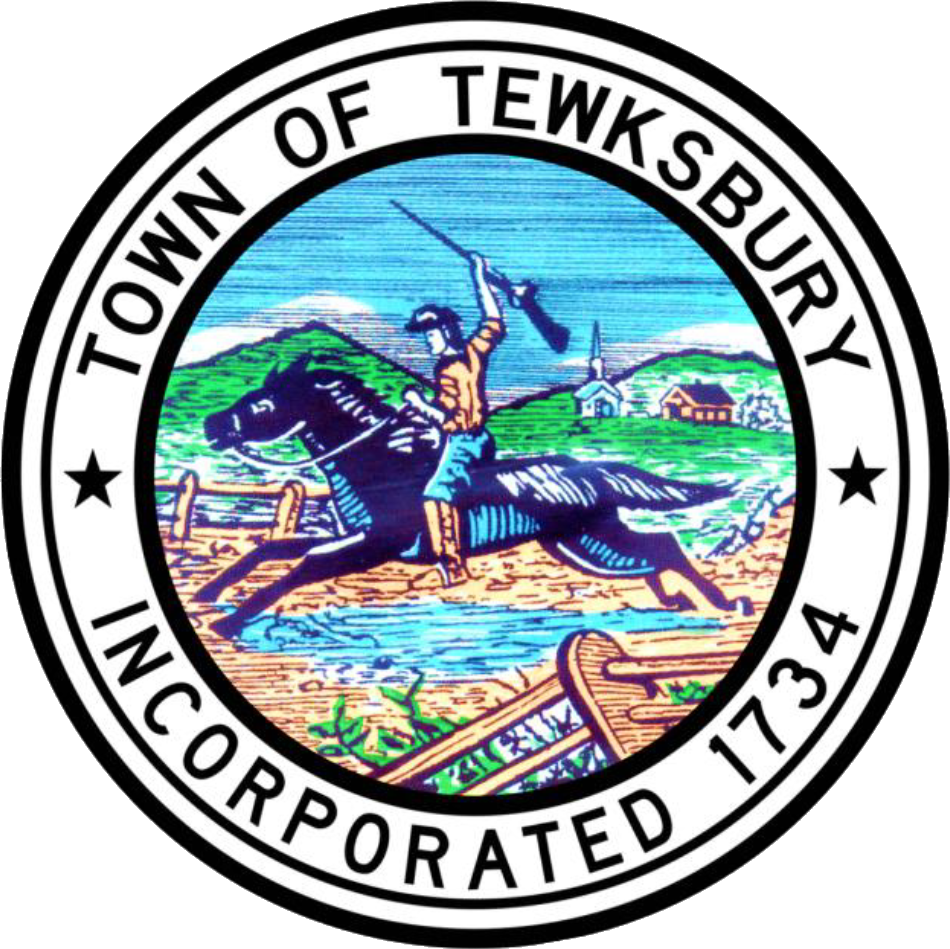
- Flag Seal

- Location in Middlesex County in Massachusetts
- Coordinates: 42°36′38″N 71°14′05″W
- Country: United States
- State: Massachusetts
- County: Middlesex
- Settled: 1637
- Incorporated: 1734

Government
  - Type: Open town meeting

Area
  - Total: 21.0 sq mi (54.5 km^{2})
  - Land: 20.7 sq mi (53.7 km^{2})
  - Water: 0.35 sq mi (0.9 km^{2})
- Elevation: 125 ft (38 m)

Population (2020)
  - Total: 31,342
  - Density: 1,510/sq mi (584/km^{2})
- Time zone: UTC−5 (Eastern)
  - Summer (DST): UTC−4 (Eastern)
- ZIP Code: 01876
- Area code: 978/351
- FIPS code: 25-69415
- GNIS feature ID: 0618238
- Website: www.tewksbury-ma.gov

Tewksbury (locally usually /ˈtʊksbɜːri/ TUUKS-bur-ee; also /ˈtuːksbɜːri/ TOOKS-burr-ee) is a town in Middlesex County, Massachusetts, United States. Its population was 31,342 as of the 2020 United States census.

== History ==
Tewksbury was first settled in 1637 and was officially incorporated on December 17, 1734, from Billerica. There is no evidence that the town was named after Tewkesbury, England. The most probable reason for the adoption of the town's name was in honor of George II of Great Britain, who from 1706 to 1714, held the title of Baron of Tewkesbury. Still, Tewksbury, Massachusetts and Tewkesbury, England kept connected through a local committee called the Twinning Committee. Tewksbury also owned a section of Lowell, being the lands east where the Merrimack River and Concord River meet, referred to by Tewksbury citizens as Belvidere.

One of the oldest sections of town is the area around the Shawsheen River. This is where the Shawshin tribe settled, allowing them access to a food source through fishing in the river.

Tewksbury was also known for a historic visit by President Andrew Jackson, who stopped at local watering hole, Brown's Tavern.

On July 24, 1857, a powerful tornado swept through Tewksbury. The storm began at Round Pond as a small water spout, and traveled west and then southeast to the Shawsheen River. It dissipated at North Wilmington. Several corn fields and orchards were severely damaged, with one residence having its roof blown off. The tornado was powerful enough to flatten barns and sheds, pull up large trees by their roots, and sweep away and kill a team of oxen. Due to the sparse population, and homes located above the valley floor, no one was killed, and only a few people were injured.

== Geography ==
According to the United States Census Bureau, the town has a total area of 21.1 square miles (55 km^{2}), of which 20.7 square miles (54 km^{2}) is land and 0.3 square miles (0.78 km^{2}), or 1.61%, is water.

The Merrimack River forms part of the northern boundary of Tewksbury, and the Shawsheen River runs through the southern end of town as well.

Tewksbury is located within the Greater Boston metropolitan area. The town is located about 19 miles (31 km) north-northwest of Boston along I-93 and I-495 (Boston's outer beltway). Tewksbury is bordered by the city of Lowell to the northwest, Dracut to the north (unreachable across the Merrimack), Andover to the northeast, Wilmington to the southeast, and Billerica to the southwest.

Tewksbury also borders the Concord River to the southwest, and the town of Chelmsford exists on the other side of this river.

== Climate ==
In a typical year, Tewksbury, Massachusetts temperatures fall below 50 °F (10 °C) for 195 days per year. Annual precipitation is typically 44.6 inches per year (high in the US) and snow covers the ground 62 days per year, or 17% of the year (high in the US). It may be helpful to understand the yearly precipitation by imagining nine straight days of moderate rain per year. The humidity is below 60% for approximately 25.4 days, or 7% of the year.

== Transportation ==
The LRTA 12 bus connects Tewksbury to Lowell and Wilmington on the MBTA Commuter Rail Lowell Line. In July 2017, Massachusetts Governor Charlie Baker and other Baker administration transportation officials visited a construction project in the city to highlight $2.8 billion spent during Baker's administration on highway construction projects and improvements to bridges, intersections, and sidewalks.

The former Tew-Mac Airport was located in the town before it was closed in 1997 and replaced with condominiums and a country club.

== Demographics ==
Historical population
Year	Pop.	±%
1790	958	—
1800	944	−1.5%
1810	943	−0.1%
1820	1,008	+6.9%
1830	1,527	+51.5%
1840	906	−40.7%
1850	1,044	+15.2%
1860	1,744	+67.0%
1870	1,944	+11.5%
1880	2,179	+12.1%
1890	2,515	+15.4%
1900	3,683	+46.4%
1910	3,750	+1.8%
1920	4,450	+18.7%
1930	5,585	+25.5%
1940	6,261	+12.1%
1950	7,505	+19.9%
1960	15,902	+111.9%
1970	22,755	+43.1%
1980	24,635	+8.3%
1990	27,266	+10.7%
2000	28,851	+5.8%
2010	28,961	+0.4%
2020	31,342	+8.2%
2024*	31,796	+1.4%
* = Population estimate. Source: United States census records and Population Estimates Program data.

As of the census of 2000, there were 28,851 people, 9,964 households, and 7,692 families residing in the town. The population density was 1,392.3 inhabitants per square mile (537.6/km^{2}). There were 10,158 housing units at an average density of 490.2 per square mile (189.3/km^{2}). The racial makeup of the town was 96.44% White, 0.67% African American, 0.12% Native American, 1.59% Asian, 0.01% Pacific Islander, 0.41% from other races, and 0.75% from two or more races. Hispanic or Latino people of any race were 1.22% of the population.

There were 9,964 households, out of which 35.9% had children under the age of 18 living with them, 65.1% were married couples living together, 9.1% had a female householder with no husband present, and 22.8% were non-families. Of all households 18.9% were made up of individuals, and 7.2% had someone living alone who was 65 years of age or older. The average household size was 2.81 and the average family size was 3.24.

The town's population was spread out, with 25.0% under the age of 18, 6.2% from 18 to 24, 32.8% from 25 to 44, 24.6% from 45 to 64, and 11.5% who were 65 years of age or older. The median age was 38 years. For every 100 females, there were 96.1 males. For every 100 females age 18 and over, there were 93.7 males.

The median income for a household in the town was $68,800, and the median income for a family was $76,443. Males had a median income of $50,296 versus $33,918 for females. The per capita income for the town was $27,031. About 1.9% of families and 3.8% of the population were below the poverty line, including 2.4% of those under age 18 and 5.3% of those age 65 or over.

== Government ==
Tewksbury, like most towns in Massachusetts, operates under a New England town form of government. Day-to-day management is led by a town manager, who reports to the town's five member board of selectmen. Every spring the town holds an open town meeting where the budget is submitted for approval by the town's citizens.

Tewksbury is located in the 6th Congressional District and thus represented in the House of Representatives by Seth Moulton of Salem. The town is represented in the Senate by Senators Ed Markey of Malden and Elizabeth Warren of Cambridge.

Tewksbury is one of the more Republican-leaning towns in Massachusetts. With the exception of 2020, Tewksbury has supported the Republican candidate for president in every election since 2008. In the 2010 special election to replace the late Ted Kennedy in the Senate, Tewksbury supported Scott Brown over Martha Coakley by a two-to-one margin.

== Hospital ==
Tewksbury Hospital, a state-owned facility, is located here. Originally built as an almshouse in the mid-19th century, it includes over 900 acres (3.6 km^{2}) of open space. The hospital is home to the Department of Mental Health and the Department of Public Health, and has many programs for addictive behavior and other health concerns.

Anne Sullivan ("Annie", Helen Keller's teacher) spent time at Tewksbury Hospital before Annie was sent to the Kellers, and suffered the loss of her younger brother, James, in his childhood before her departure.

Tewksbury Hospital and the Public Health Museum in the Old Administration building were featured in the Stephen King series Castle Rock, as was the Tewksbury Cemetery directly across the street.

The building houses murals done by artists during the Works Progress Administration program.

== Education ==
The Tewksbury public schools district serves students in pre-kindergarten through twelfth grade by a high school, two junior high schools, and three elementary schools, specifically:

- Tewksbury Memorial High School (TMHS): grades 9–12
- John W. Wynn Middle School: grades 7–8
- John F. Ryan Elementary School: grades 5–6
- Center Elementary School: grades 2-4
- Loella F. Dewing Elementary School: grades Pre-K–1
- Heath Brook Elementary School: grades K–1

There were four elementary schools in Tewksbury serving grades K-4 that were later redistricted. The two schools on each side of town were grouped together and each was given specific grades for that school.

North Tewksbury:

- Loella F. Dewing Elementary School: grades Pre-K–2
- North Street Elementary School: grades 3-4

South Tewksbury:

- Heath Brook Elementary School: grades K–2
- Louise Davy Trahan Elementary School: grades 3-4

High school students have the option to attend Shawsheen Valley Technical High School, which serves five area communities.

Tewksbury's athletic teams are known as the Redmen.

The nearest community college, Middlesex Community College, has two campuses in nearby Lowell and Bedford. The nearest state university is the University of Massachusetts Lowell, with several state colleges in Salem and Framingham. The nearest private college is Merrimack College in North Andover, with several others within an hour's drive in Boston.

== Media ==
Tewksbury is served by the Boston television stations, and by newspapers such as the Boston Herald and the Town Crier (weekly). They also have their own local public-access television station called Tewksbury TV which provides coverage on the various Tewksbury government and committee meetings along with Tewksbury Memorial High School athletics.

== Notable people ==
- Adelbert Ames (1835–1933), Medal of Honor recipient; last surviving Civil War general
- Mico Kaufman (1924–2016), sculptor, Presidential and Olympic medal designer, recipient of Saultus Award 1992
- John James Nazarian (born 1952), celebrity private investigator
- Scott Oberg (born 1990), professional baseball pitcher for the Colorado Rockies
- Ada Bessie Swann (1887–1963), home economist, broadcaster, cookbook author
- Anne Sullivan (1866–1936), tutor and companion of Helen Keller
- Paul Sullivan (1957–2007) former selectman, talk show host on WBZ radio, Boston
- John Trull (1738–1797), captain of the Tewksbury Minutemen in the Revolutionary War
