= North Town Hall =

- U.S. National Register of Historic Places
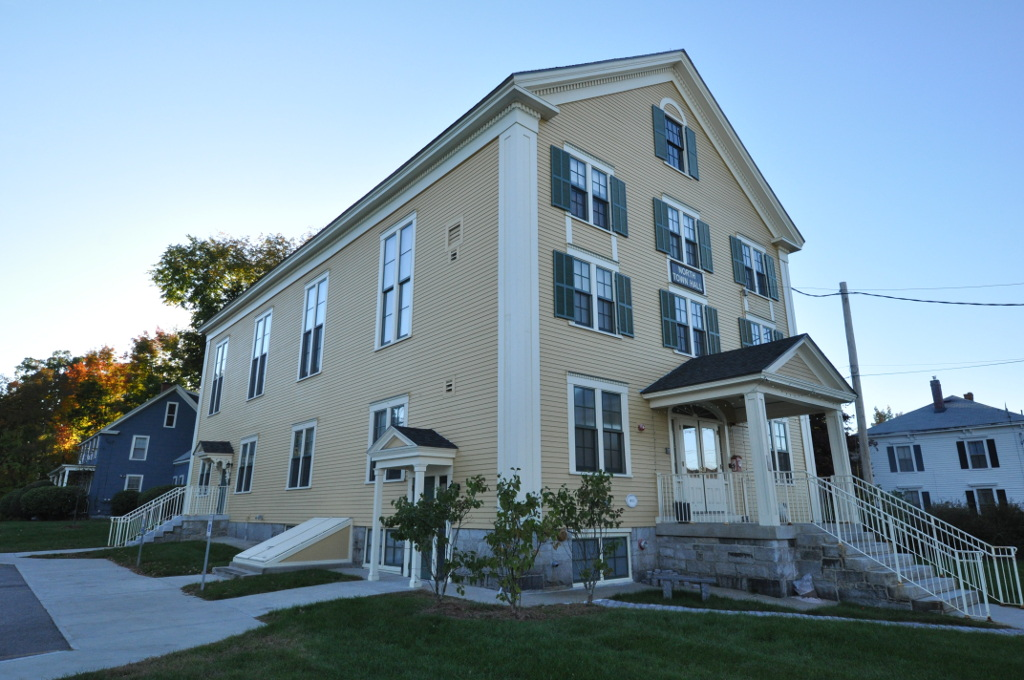

- Location within Massachusetts Location within the United States
- Location: 31 Princeton St., Chelmsford, Massachusetts
- Coordinates: 42°38′15″N 71°22′53.6″W
- Built: 1853
- Architectural style: Greek Revival
- NRHP reference No.: 15000732
- Added to NRHP: October 13, 2015

The North Town Hall is one of two historic 19th-century town halls in Chelmsford, Massachusetts. Located at 31 Princeton Street, near the North Chelmsford village center, it is a 2 1/2-story wood-frame structure with Greek Revival styling. It was built in 1853, and was used, alternating with the Centre Town Hall, for town meetings until 1885. It was thereafter used as a community meeting hall and polling station, a role it served until 1967, when the town moved its school administration offices there. In 2011 the building underwent a full restoration, and is again used as a community center.

The building was listed on the National Register of Historic Places in 2015.

== See also ==
- National Register of Historic Places listings in Middlesex County, Massachusetts
