= Ada Bessie Swann =

American home economist

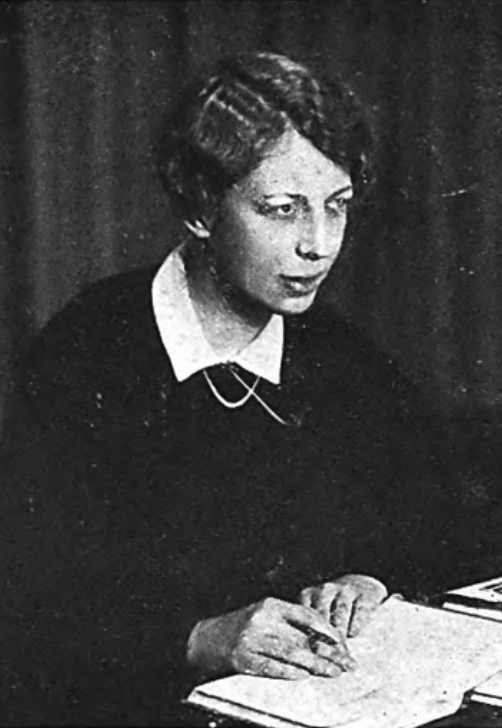
- Swann, from a 1928 publication
- Born: April 22, 1887; Tewksbury, Massachusetts, U.S.
- Died: October 15, 1963 (aged 76); Newton, Massachusetts, U.S.
- Other name: Ada Bessie Swann Gore
- Occupations: Home economist, cookbook author, magazine editor, broadcaster

Ada Bessie Swann Gore (April 22, 1887 – October 15, 1963) was an American home economist, editor, broadcaster, and cookbook author. She was home services director of the Public Service Electrical & Gas Company, chair of the Electrical Women's Round Table, and a contributing editor of Woman's Home Companion magazine.

== Early life ==
Swann was born in Tewksbury, Massachusetts, the daughter of Alfred Swann and Martha S. Huckle Swann. Her parents were born in England.

== Career ==
Swann became home services director of the Public Service Electric & Gas Company of Newark in 1917. She and her department were responsible for publicizing the safe uses of new gas and electric appliances in the home, including for laundry, lighting, cleaning, food storage, and cooking. She hosted a radio cooking program, lectured to women's clubs, and published a cookbook as part of this work. She promoted modern appliances as more reliable and more efficient than previous methods, and women as responsible managers of the home, saying "There isn't so much grace of Providence about a successful home. Somebody is pretty sure to be making it so."

In 1923 Swann was a founding member and chair of the Electrical Women's Round Table. She was elected president of the New Jersey Home Economics Association in 1928. In 1930, she was chair of the Home Services Subcommittee of the National Electric Light Association, and spoke at the first National Home Service Conference in Chicago. In the 1930s she was home service director of Woman's Home Companion.

== Publications ==
- "A Gas Company's Contribution to the Better Home Movement" (1923)
- "The Value of a Home Service Department to a Gas Company" (1925)
- Public Service Radio Cooking School Recipe Book (1928)
- "New Ideas in Home-making" (1930s newspaper column)

== Personal life ==
Swann married Francis Porter Gore. Her husband, an insurance executive, died in 1960 and she died in 1963, in Newton, Massachusetts, in her seventies.
