= Oliver Hutchins House =

Historic house in Massachusetts, United States

- U.S. National Register of Historic Places
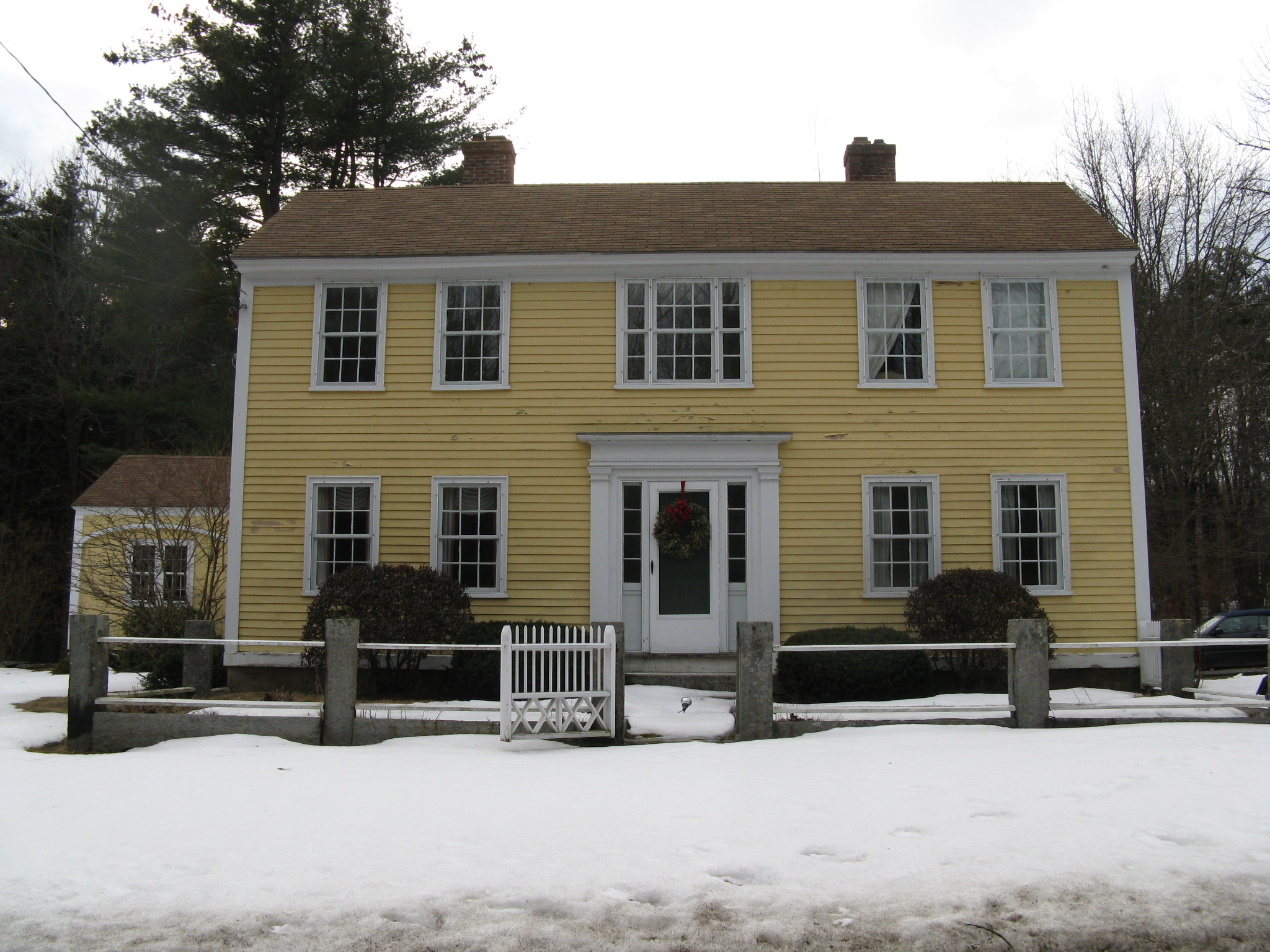
- Oliver Hutchins House

- Location within Massachusetts Location within the United States
- Location: Chelmsford, Massachusetts
- Coordinates: 42°33′25″N 71°22′52″W
- Built: 1820
- Architectural style: Federal
- NRHP reference No.: 85002013
- Added to NRHP: September 5, 1985

The Oliver Hutchins House is an historic house at 79 Elm Street in Chelmsford, Massachusetts. The 2 1/2 story house was built in the 1820s, probably by Oliver Hutchins and his brother. The house's foundations and other stone elements indicate that the Hutchinses were probably associated with the local granite quarries in some way. The house is one of a few local houses that is transitional between Georgian and Federal styling: the basic plan of the house is Georgian, despite the lack of central chimney, and the exterior and interior woodwork are heavily influenced by the publications of Asher Benjamin.

The house was listed on the National Register of Historic Places in 1985.

== See also ==
- National Register of Historic Places listings in Middlesex County, Massachusetts
