= Old Chelmsford Garrison House =

Historic house in Massachusetts, United States

- Old Chelmsford Garrison House Complex
- U.S. National Register of Historic Places
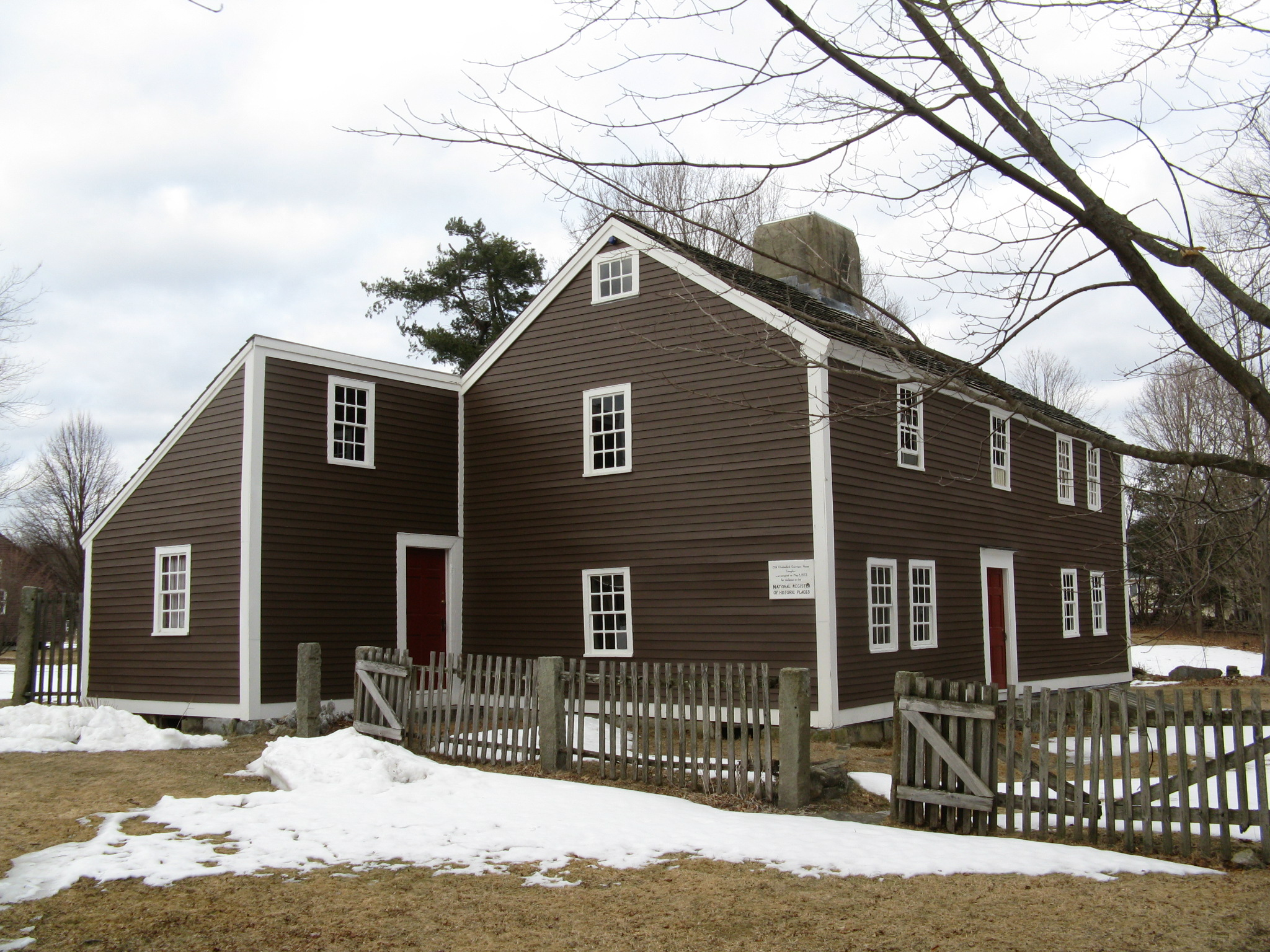
- Old Chelmsford Garrison House

- Location within Massachusetts Location within the United States
- Location: 105 Garrison Road, Chelmsford, Massachusetts
- Coordinates: 42°34′42″N 71°23′30″W
- Built: 1691
- Architectural style: Colonial
- NRHP reference No.: 73000289
- Added to NRHP: May 8, 1973

The "Old Chelmsford" Garrison House (also known as the Old Chelmsford Garrison House Complex) is a historic house in Chelmsford, Massachusetts. It is the oldest house in Chelmsford, and has been preserved by the Garrison House Society as a museum. It was listed on the National Register of Historic Places in 1973.

The exact date the building was erected is not known; it is claimed by the Society to have been built before 1691, when it is claimed to be one of the houses listed as a garrison house in Chelmsford, but a 1702 deed transferring land on which it stands does not mention it. Thomas Adams deeded the land to his son, Peletiah Adams, in 1683, and Peletiah deeded the land to his two sons in 1702, who probably built the house. Stylistic analysis of its construction also supports a post-1700 construction date. The same stylistic analysis casts doubt on the belief that the house actually served as a fortified garrison.

Before the title passed to the Garrison House Society in 1952, only three families had previously owned it. Very few modifications had been made to it in all that time, making it a relatively accurate historic showpiece. The house now shares its lot with a barn, summer kitchen, a working blacksmith shop, an herb garden, a craft house and the "Hill Jock House," which was saved from destruction and moved in 2004 to the lot shared by the Old Chelmsford Garrison House.

== See also ==
- List of historic houses in Massachusetts
- List of the oldest buildings in Massachusetts
- National Register of Historic Places listings in Middlesex County, Massachusetts
