= Heart Pond (Massachusetts) =

Pond in Chelmsford, Massachusetts

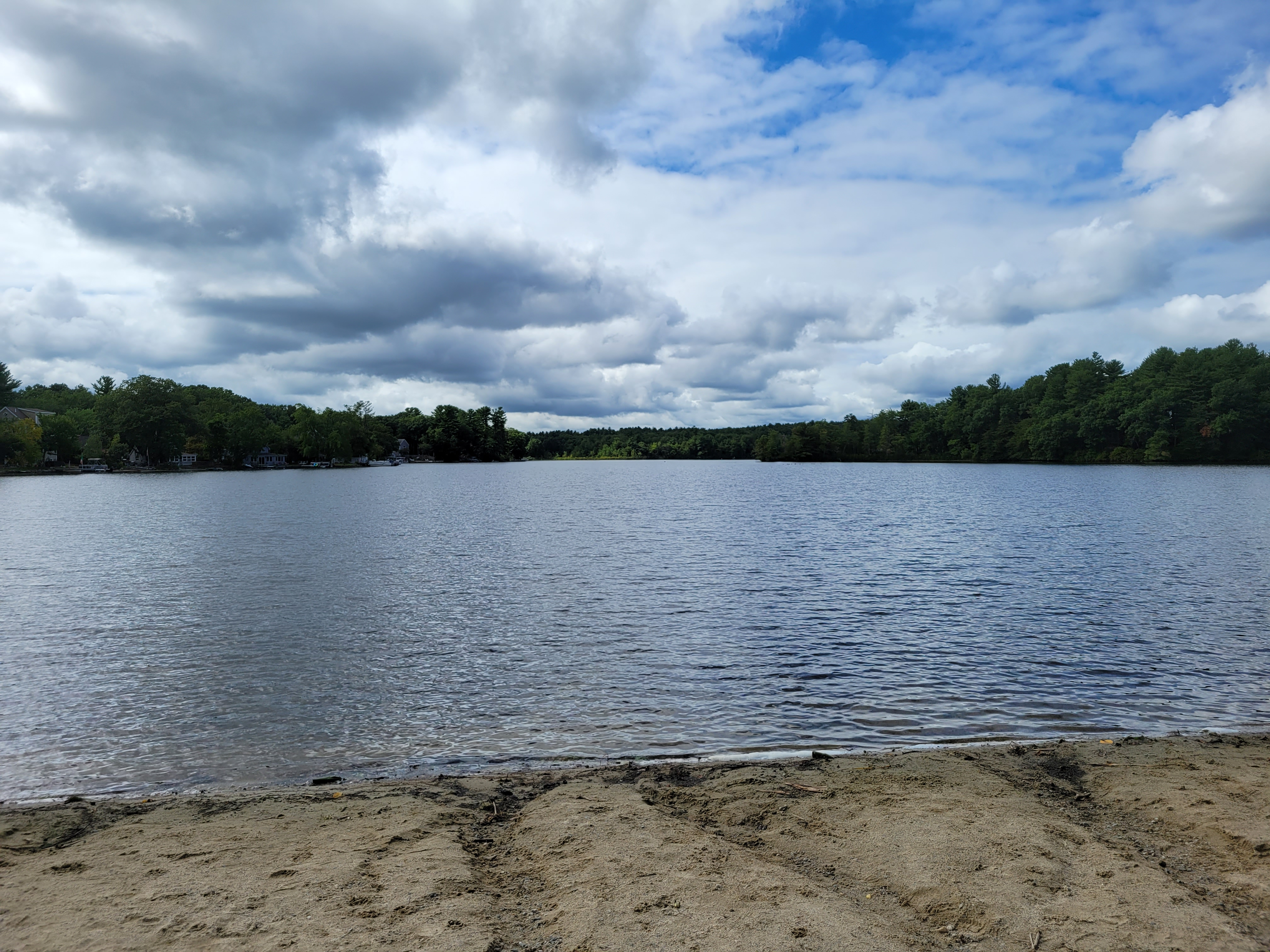

- Location within Massachusetts Location within the United States
- Location: Chelmsford, Massachusetts
- Coordinates: 42.565604°N 71.388186°W
- Type: Kettle pond
- Primary inflows: Pond Brook
- Basin countries: United States
- Surface area: 91 acres (37 ha)
- Max. depth: 20 feet (6.1 m)

Heart Pond (also known as Hart Pond, Baptist Pond or Baptist lake) is a great pond in the southwestern corner of Chelmsford, Massachusetts. The pond borders the town of Westford, Massachusetts, and has a surface area of 91 acres and a maximum depth of 20 feet. The pond is a warm-water fishery and is a popular fishing-spot in the town, containing Largemouth bass, Black Bullhead, Bluegill, Chain Pickerel, White and Yellow perch, and Sunfish.

== Formation ==
Heart Pond is a large kettle pond, meaning it was formed by retreating glaciers or draining floodwaters. The pond has a surface area of 91 acres and a maximum depth of 20 feet (6.1 m). It is primarily fed by Pond Brook.

== Swimming ==
The beach is available for swimmers from dusk to dawn. There are no lifeguards.

== Ice harvesting ==
In the 1800s and early 1900s, the lake was used by the Daniel Gage Ice Company for harvesting ice.
