= John Trull =

Capt. John Trull (1738–1797) was the commander of the Tewksbury, Massachusetts minuteman company on the first day of the American Revolution, at the Battle of Lexington & Concord.

== Background ==
By the time of the Revolution, the Trull family was already well established in America. John Trull was at least the fourth generation of Trulls in Massachusetts, and possibly the fifth. His farm consisted of about 200 acres of land, including a grist and saw mill, on Trull Brook in Tewksbury. Trull's Mill was a local landmark that survived well into the 1800s. The family also owned a shrinking mill (for shrinking and drying cloth) opposite of the saw/grist mill. Capt. Trull used one of his fields as the training ground for drilling his company of minutemen.

== The "Shot Heard 'Round the World" – Lexington & Concord ==
On the night of April 18, 1775, Paul Revere and William Dawes left Boston to warn of the British troops coming to capture the colony's supply of arms and powder at Concord, and possibly arrest Samuel Adams and John Hancock, who were staying in Lexington. Revere and Dawes set off a chain reaction of other alarm riders, who fanned out across Massachusetts.

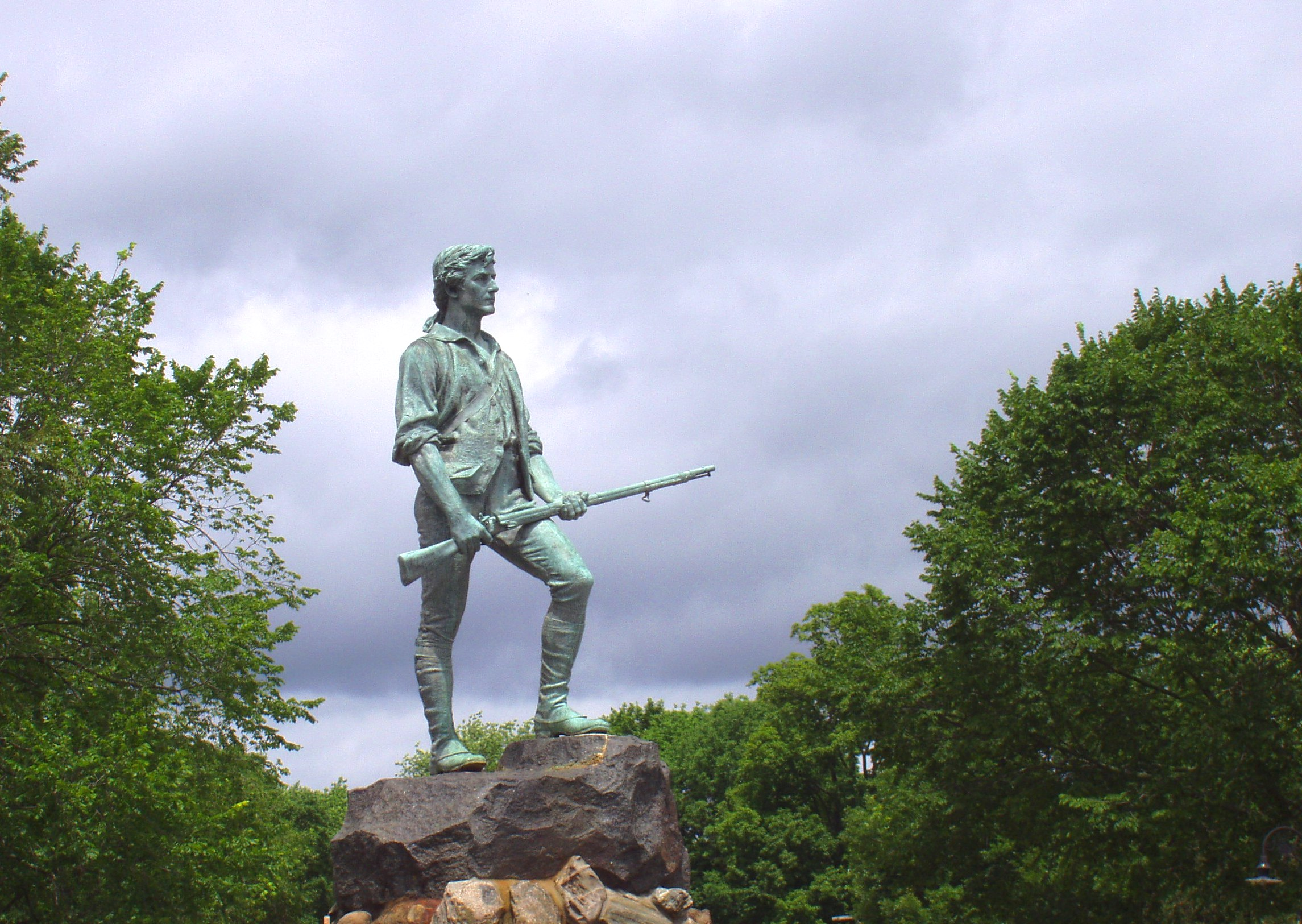
Minuteman statue at Lexington

At approximately 2:00 a.m., one of these riders reached John Trull's house and without dismounting, called out that the Regulars were on the march. Ancient tradition has it that the galloping horseman depicted on the Tewksbury Town Seal is this rider. Trull quickly fired off three shots, purportedly from his bedroom window, which was a prearranged signal to Capt. Varnum, of the Dracut minute company, who lived across the Merrimack River.

After hearing Capt. Varnum's shots in response, Trull rode rapidly to the village, where some of his men had already gathered and armed themselves. Trull placed himself at their head and marched them off toward Concord. His company and others positioned themselves near the road between Lexington and Concord at Meriam's Corner. Their exertions there turned an orderly British retreat into a rout.

The Regulars had already exchanged fire with the militia at Lexington, then marched on to Concord, where more shots were fired. A growing swarm of irate militia convinced the British commander that it was time to get back to Boston. The topography at Meriam's Corner forced the British flanking parties back to the road, and thus proved to be a perfect ambush point for Trull and the other colonists.

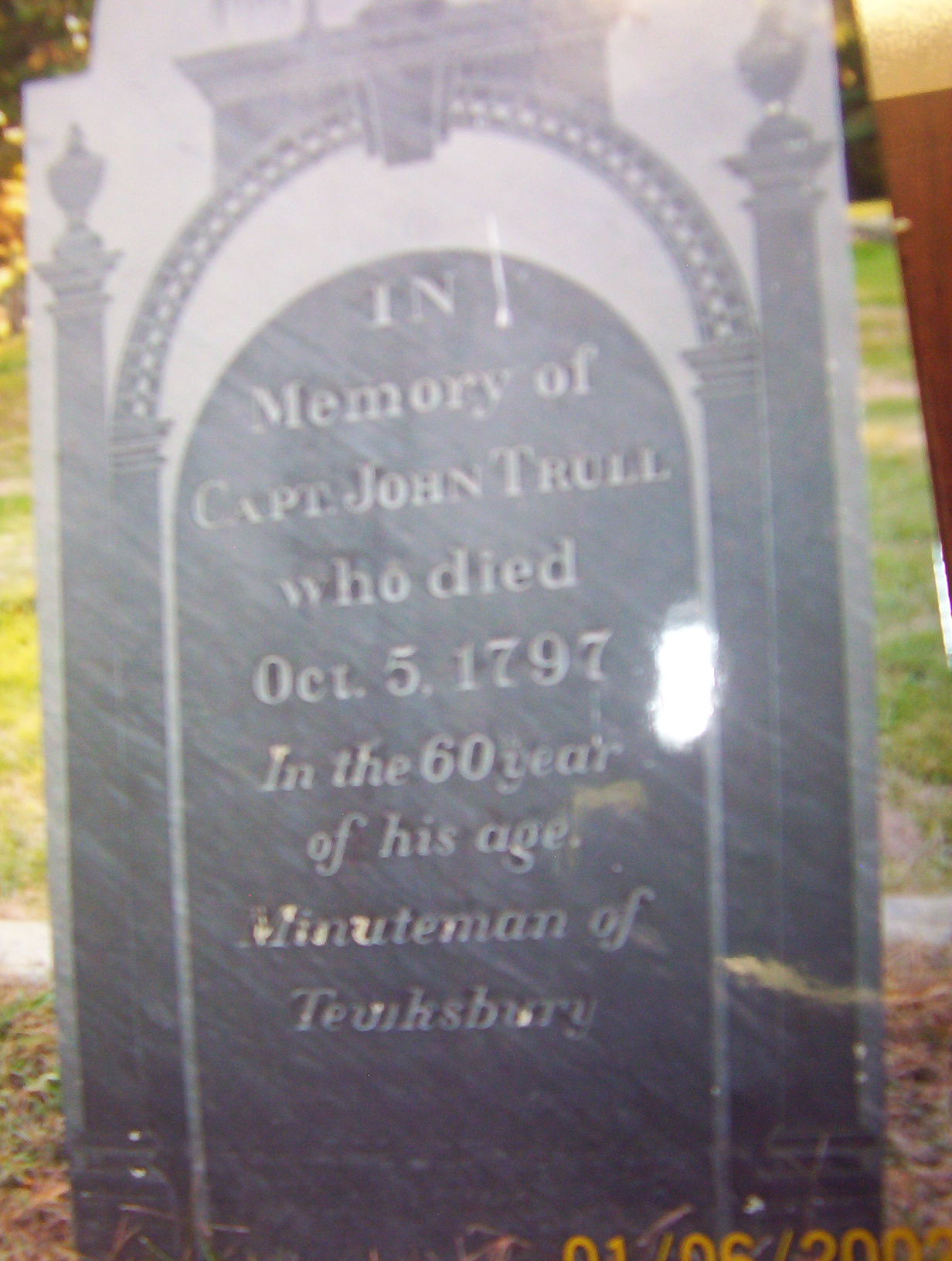
Gravestone of Capt. John Trull in Tewksbury

As the day went along, minute and standard militia companies would find a place providing good cover from which to attack the passing British column. After firing a volley, they would then leapfrog ahead through fields, to another good spot and repeat the process. Other companies followed the column putting fire into its rear. As Trull later recalled, the Regulars "ran well" under this galling fire.

Trull's and other companies chased the British all the way back to Charlestown, with the number of angry colonists shooting at the Regulars growing with every mile. If British Gen. Gage in Boston, had not sent out an additional 1,000 reinforcements, along with two field pieces, the original expeditionary force of 700 would likely have never made it back. As an old man, Eliphalet Manning, who was one of Trull's minutemen, related the story to one of Trull's grandchildren this way, "I fought with your grandfather from Concord to Charlestown. He would cry out to us as we sheltered ourselves behind the trees: 'Stand trim, men, or the rascals will shoot your elbows off.'"

== Subsequent developments ==
The Trull farmhouse overlooked the Merrimack River. It was located on Stickney Hill, also known as River Road Hill, near the intersection of River Road and Trull Road. It survived until about 1912, when it burned. A descendant, Bailey Trull, converted about 125 acres of the family farm into the Trull Brook Golf Course in 1963. The original Trull barn was used as a temporary clubhouse. The land has been in the family for over 200 years and 14 generations. There is a commemorative monument and plaque at the corner of River and Hood Roads in Tewksbury, near the Trull homesite.
