= Hildreth-Robbins House =

Historic house in Massachusetts, US

- U.S. National Register of Historic Places
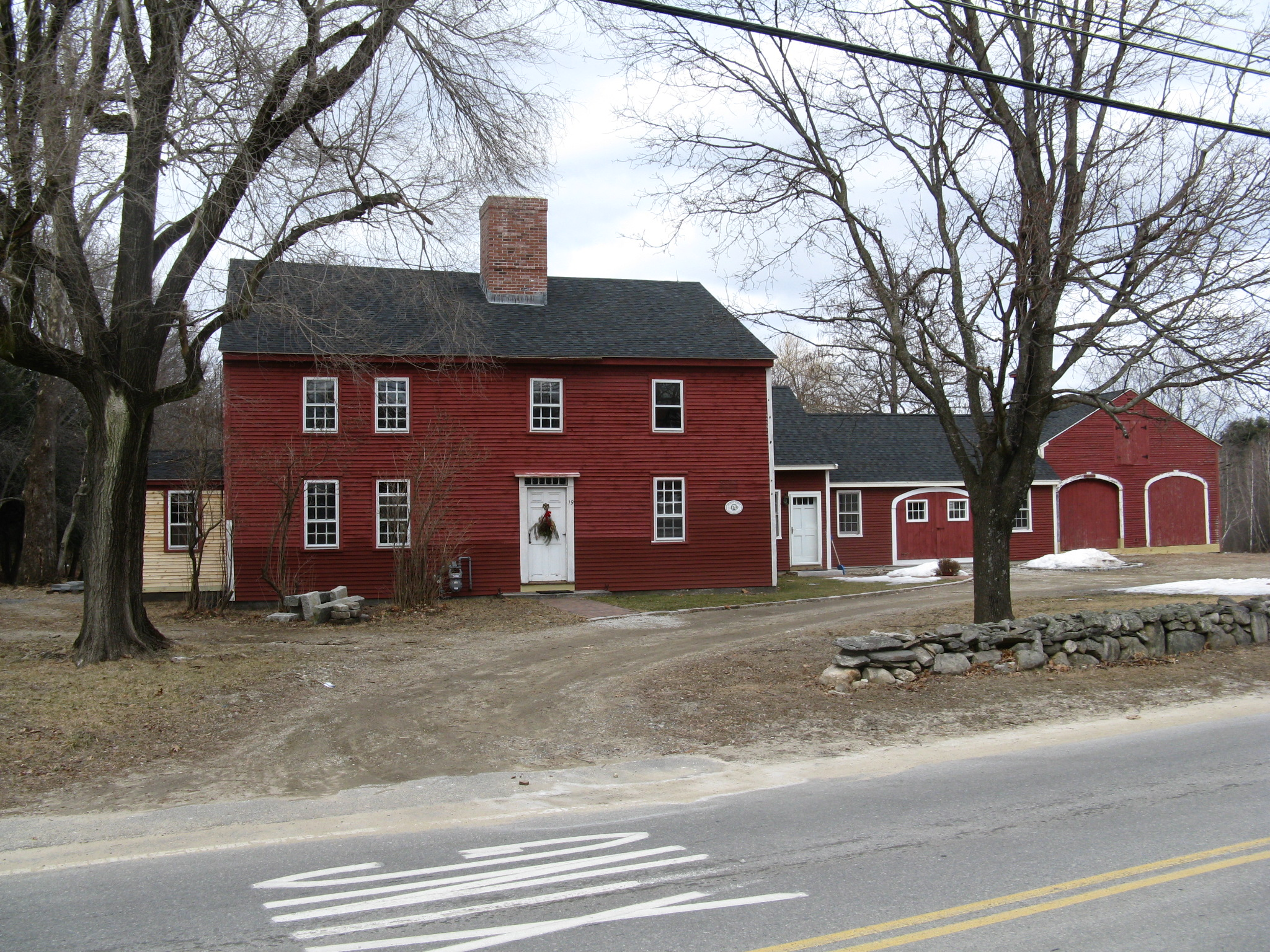
- Hildreth-Robbins House

- Location within Massachusetts Location within the United States
- Location: 19 Maple Road; Chelmsford, Massachusetts
- Coordinates: 42°34′18″N 71°22′48″W
- Area: 1.32 acres (0.53 ha)
- Built: 1742
- Architectural style: Georgian
- NRHP reference No.: 06001090
- Added to NRHP: November 29, 2006

The Hildreth-Robbins House (also known as Red Wing Farm) is a historic house at 19 Maple Road in Chelmsford, Massachusetts. The main block of the 2 1/2-story wood-frame house was built in three stages, most likely over the course of the second half of the 18th century. That block is connected to a 19th-century barn (post-1860) via a long single-story ell. The property is significant as one of the major farmsteads of south Chelmsford of the 18th and 19th centuries. It is also distinctive as a rare 18th-century farm that was owned by a woman, Sarah Hildreth.

The house was listed on the National Register of Historic Places in 2006.

== See also ==
- National Register of Historic Places listings in Middlesex County, Massachusetts
