= Clark County High School (disambiguation) =

Clark County High School is a public high school in Kahoka, Missouri, United States.

Clark County High School may also refer to:

- Clark County High School (Idaho) in Dubois, Idaho, United States

It may also be used incorrectly in Kentucky to refer to George Rogers Clark High School in Winchester, the only public high school serving Clark County, Kentucky.

== See also ==
- Clark High School (disambiguation)
- Clarke County High School (disambiguation)
