= Bridget Richardson Fletcher =

Bridget Richardson Fletcher (1726–1770) was a hymn writer and religious poet. Her songs provide insight into the life of Colonial women, providing insight into times of sadness and joy. She describes her views on the ideal couple, where women are prized and women submit to men. Her works were among the first women's poems in Colonial America.

== Personal life ==
Bridget Richardson, the daughter of Sarah and Captain Zachary Richardson, was born on April 23, 1726, in Chelmsford in Middlesex County, Massachusetts, which was an agricultural area. It is possible that her father Zachary was a farmer. She had 14 siblings. She was among the minority of 40% of the female population that were literate during her time of life. It is unknown if she attended a school or not.

Bridget married Timothy Fletcher, a tavern owner, becoming Bridget Richardson Fletcher. They were married in Chelmsford on February 15, 1746. The Fletchers lived in Westford, Massachusetts, a town neighboring Chelmsford. Their six children included Jesse, Josiah, and Elijah Fletcher. They had three daughters, one of whom died in infancy.

Fletcher's son Elijah, a Congregationalist minister, graduated from Harvard College. Elijah's daughter Grace, was the first wife of Daniel Webster. Sons Josiah and Jesse moved to Ludlow, Vermont with Jesse's wife Lucy Keyes and their baby about 1782.

Fletcher died on June 8, 1770. She is buried at Fairview Cemetery, Chelmsford, Massachusetts. In 1773, her son published her liturgical work. (Note: Snodgrass says that the book was published in 1774.)

== Writer ==
After her death, the book Hymns and Spiritual Songs On Special Occasions of Fletcher's works was published. It is said that the book was published at the request of her friends. Fletcher did not likely intend that the songs would go beyond her circle of friends and family. Most of her works conform to standard ballad stanza and meter of the 18th century.

Her body of works reflects the spiritual growth that Fletcher experienced from a point in her life when she was melancholy, like the song No Darkness Be Compared with Spiritual Darkness, No Sorrow Like Soul Sorrow to her later years when she was grateful and closer to God's spirit. She wrote about sin, redemption, and grace. She describes spiritual desolation with images of darkness, nighttime, and prison. Spiritual joy is described with images of day, light, and feasting. Fletcher describes life as a Christian as a journey or warfare.

Her songs centered on family life like childrearing, marriage, and proper conduct. In the hymn LXX. The Duty of Man and Wife. Fletcher asks couples to live in harmony and unity, the husband loving and prizing his wife, and the wife to submit as is fair. Writing hymns about women at the time was considered a "landmark in American hymns".

... the new ideal counseled that male authority should be restrained and held in reserve to ensure that mutual affection, cooperation, and consent among husbands and wives served as the basis for everyday decision-making.

— Mark E. Kann, The gendering of American politics

== Legacy ==
Susanne M. Zweizig wrote in her American National Biography article about Fletcher,

While it is unlikely that Fletcher will ever be considered a major American poet, her verse provides important insights into the spiritual life of one eighteenth-century woman, and the religious and poetic conventions of her culture. Moreover, it establishes Fletcher as one of the earliest known women poets published in colonial America.
