= Electrical Women's Round Table =

American organization for women in the electrical industry

The Electrical Women's Round Table (EWRT) was an American organization founded in 1923 to provide a professional network for women in the electricity industry. The organization was incorporated in the state of New York in 1927, became a national organization in 1948, and in 1998 expanded its scope again, to become the Women's International Network of Utility Professionals (WiNUP).

== Founding and early years ==
The Electrical Women's Round Table was founded by seven women attending the Society for Electrical Development meeting in 1923, and incorporated in New York in 1927 with more than fifty charter members in the New York area. Ada Bessie Swann of New Jersey was a charter member and first chair of the group. "We believe this to be the first group of its kind," wrote board member Lilian Cassels in 1925. It welcomed women working in all aspects of the electricity industry, including home economists, electricians, editors, teachers, designers, businesswomen, and engineers. In 1927, the group produced a children's pantomime, "Cinderella's House", performed at an exposition of women's arts and industries in New York.

== After 1948 ==
The Electrical Women's Round Table held its first national annual conference in 1954, in St. Louis. The first day of workshops was open to the public, especially educators and representatives of allied fields. They awarded scholarships, hosted speakers, and promoted the safe use of electricity in the home, through educational outreach to women. The Round Table had 24 chapters nationwide by 1974. Local chapters held social events and fundraisers. For example, the Portland, Oregon, chapter offered men's cooking classes in the 1970s. A chapter in Tennessee held a poster contest about energy conservation in 1975, and an Indiana chapter published a cookbook in 1992.

In 1998, the organization expanded its geographic and professional scopes, and was reorganized as the Women's International Network of Utility Professionals (WiNUP).

== See also ==
- Electrical Association for Women
