= Chelmsford Center Historic District =

Historic district in Massachusetts, United States

- U.S. National Register of Historic Places
- U.S. Historic district
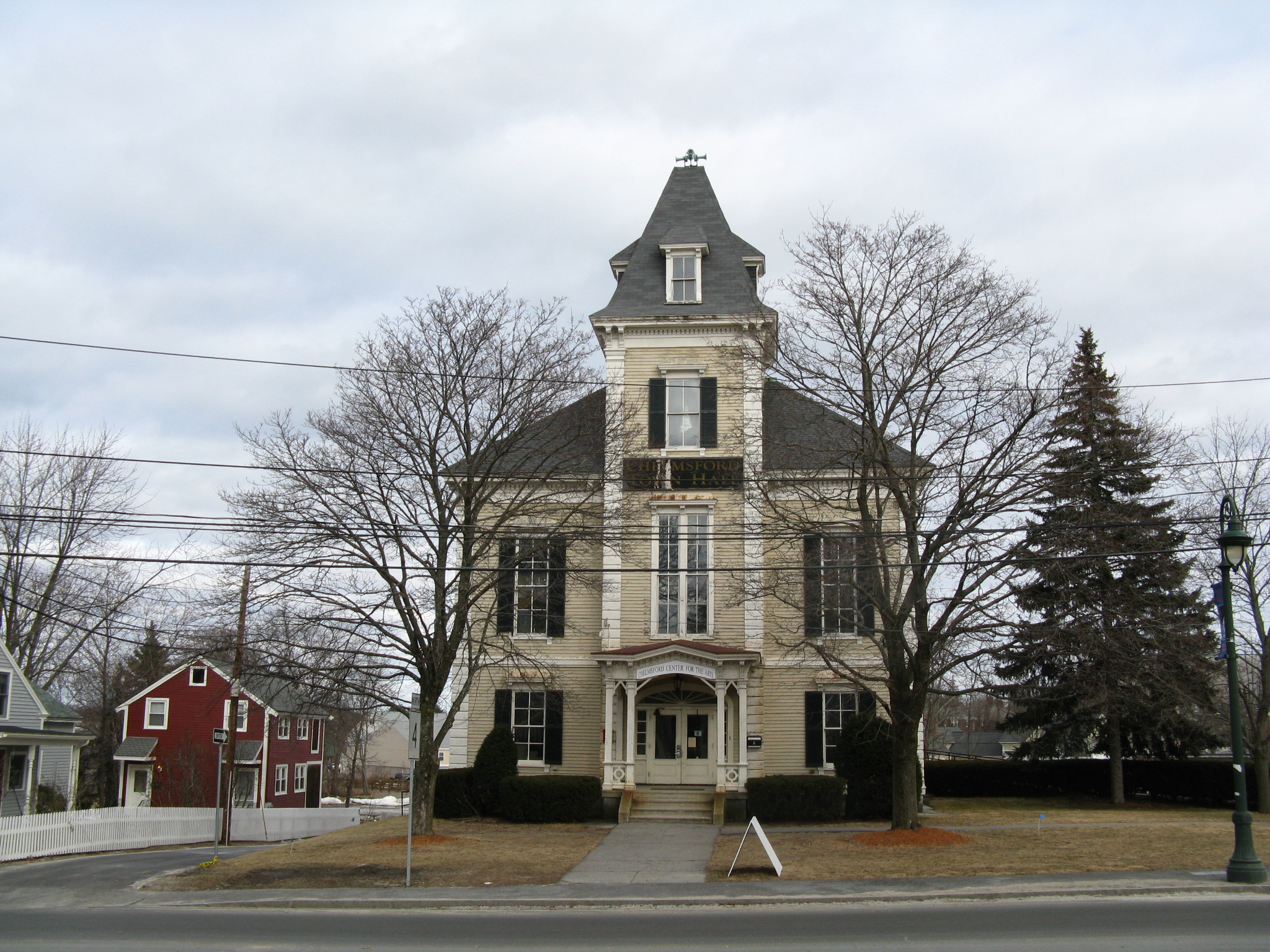
- Old Town Hall

- Location within Massachusetts Location within the United States
- Location: Chelmsford, Massachusetts
- Coordinates: 42°35′53″N 71°21′15″W
- Area: 35 acres (14 ha)
- Architectural style: Greek Revival, Italianate
- NRHP reference No.: 80000646
- Added to NRHP: February 20, 1980

The Chelmsford Center Historic District is a historic district encompassing the historic heart of the town of Chelmsford, Massachusetts. It extends from the town's central square in the east, where the intersection of Billerica Road and Chelmsford Street is located, west beyond the junction of Littleton and North Roads with Westford Street, and from there north along Worthen Road. It includes the area that was the 17th-century heart of the town, including its common and first burying ground, and has been the town's civic heart since its founding.

The district was added to National Register of Historic Places in 1980.

== See also ==
- National Register of Historic Places listings in Middlesex County, Massachusetts
