= Clark School (Rowley, Massachusetts) =

Private school in Rowley, Massachusetts, United States

Clark School is a private school in Rowley, Massachusetts, United States. The Lower School was founded in 1978 and the High School was founded in 2006. They have a theater program and a tech program that offer hands on experience for their students. Dan Hall is a history teacher at Clark high school, he is notable for his many creative projects. The school itself is quite old and was founded by the Clark family. In 2019 Clark had a 40th anniversary.
