= Emerson House (Methuen, Massachusetts) =

Historic house in Massachusetts, United States

- U.S. National Register of Historic Places
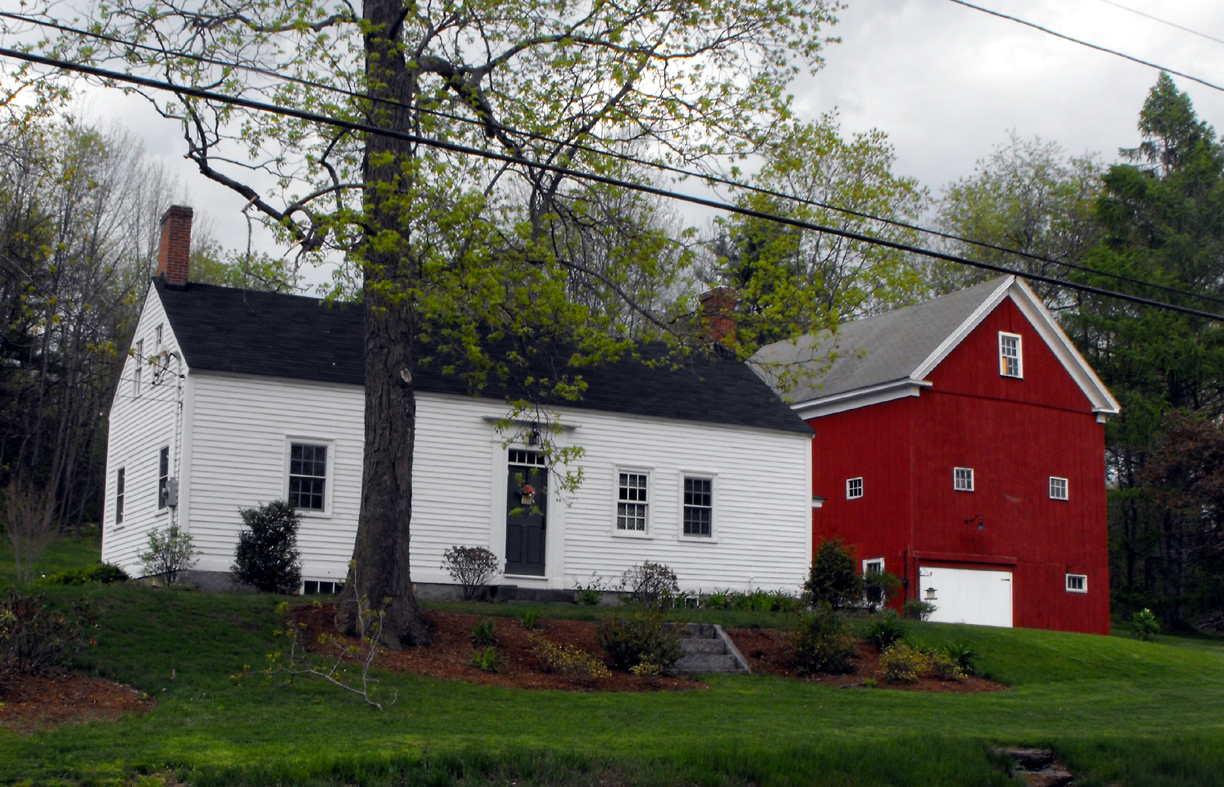

- Location within Massachusetts Location within the United States
- Location: Methuen, Massachusetts
- Coordinates: 42°42′27″N 71°10′19″W
- Built: 1750
- Architectural style: Greek Revival, Other
- MPS: Methuen MRA
- NRHP reference No.: 84002351
- Added to NRHP: January 20, 1984

The Emerson House is a historic house located at 58 Ayers Village Road in Methuen, Massachusetts. It is set in a rural corner of northeastern Methuen, near the town line with Haverhill.

== Description and history ==
It is a 1 1/2-story vernacular wood-frame structure, five bays wide, with a side gable roof, end chimneys, and clapboard siding. Its front facade has a centered entrance, which is topped by a transom window and framed by Greek Revival pilasters and entablature. The bays flanking the entrance are symmetrically placed pairs of small sash windows.

This colonial farm house was built in 1750 and remains a well preserved 18th century dwelling and conserves a portion of the original rural landscape.

The house was added to the National Register of Historic Places on January 20, 1984.

== See also ==
- National Register of Historic Places listings in Methuen, Massachusetts
