= Capt. Oliver Emerson Homestead =

Historic house in Massachusetts, United States

- U.S. National Register of Historic Places
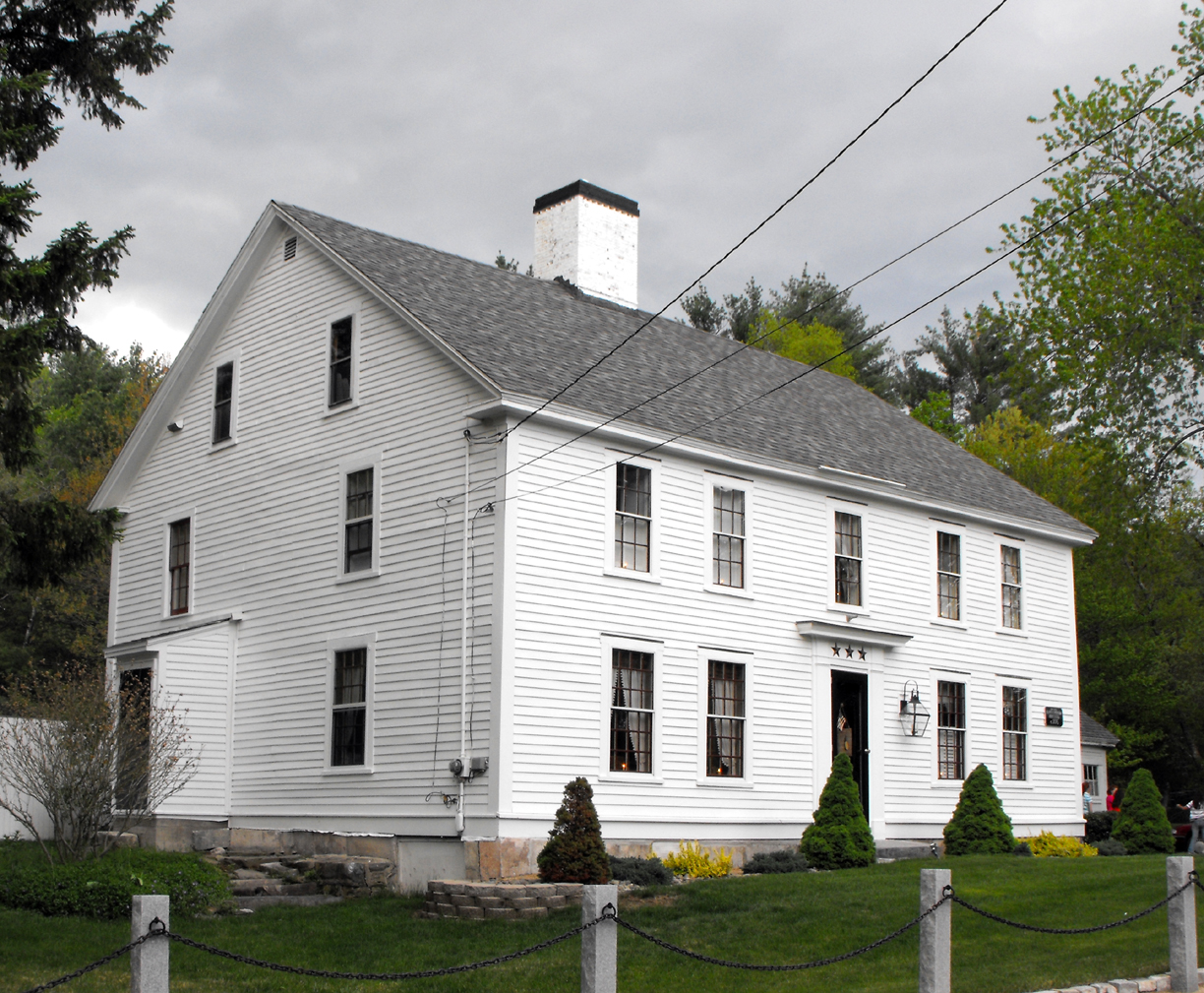
- Capt. Oliver Emerson Homestead

- Location within Massachusetts Location within the United States
- Location: Methuen, Massachusetts
- Coordinates: 42°46′38″N 71°10′50″W
- Built: 1775
- Architectural style: Georgian
- MPS: Methuen MRA
- NRHP reference No.: 84002347
- Added to NRHP: January 20, 1984

The Capt. Oliver Emerson Homestead is a historic house at 133 North Street in Methuen, Massachusetts. The 2 1/2-story wood-frame house was built c. 1775 by Oliver Emerson, a locally notable leader of American Revolutionary War forces. The house is built on a rubble foundation, and features a large central chimney that is typical of Georgian houses. It is located on one Methuen's early roads, and is one of a few remaining houses that predate the height of the city's development in the mid 19th century.

The house was listed on the National Register of Historic Places January 20, 1984.

== See also ==
- National Register of Historic Places listings in Methuen, Massachusetts
- National Register of Historic Places listings in Essex County, Massachusetts
