= Henry Preston House =

Historic house in Massachusetts, United States

- House 15–19 Park Street
- U.S. National Register of Historic Places
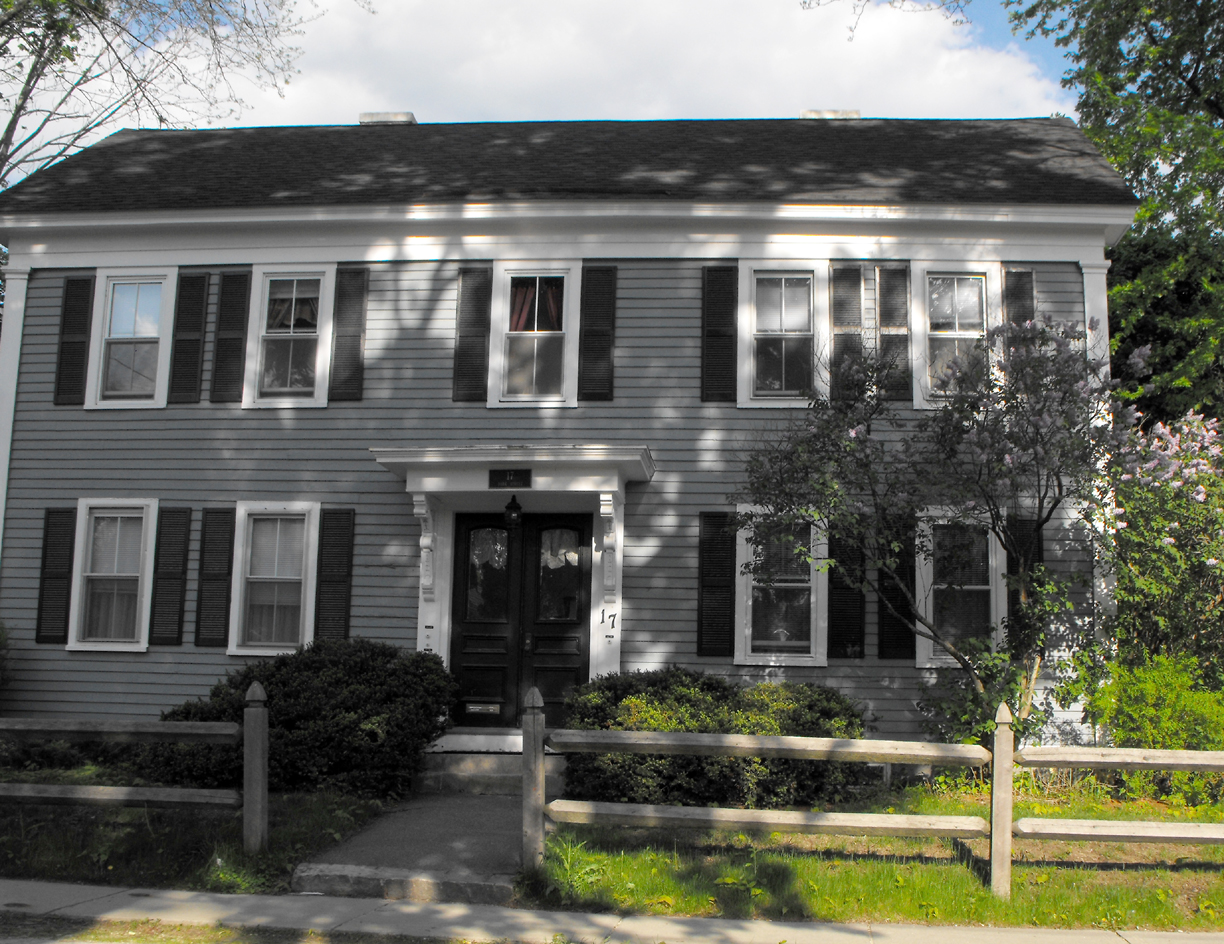
- The Henry Preston House

- Location within Massachusetts Location within the United States
- Location: 15–19 Park St., Methuen, Massachusetts
- Coordinates: 42°43′38″N 71°11′5″W
- Built: 1840
- Architectural style: Greek Revival
- MPS: Methuen MRA
- NRHP reference No.: 84002388
- Added to NRHP: January 20, 1984

The Henry Preston House is a historic house in Methuen, Massachusetts.

Built around 1840, the house was originally built as a one-story house belonging to Henry Preston who had a wheelwright shop next door. Assessor's records indicate that in the 1850s, the house belonged to Enoch A. Merrill, and in 1875 the estate of Enoch A. Merrill was taxed to Joel Foster. The barn, which still exists, appears of the map between 1872 and 1884. Foster, who owned other farm sites in Methuen, was named the leading farmer in Essex County in 1884.

It was added to the National Register of Historic Places as the House at 15–19 Park Street in 1984.

== See also ==
- National Register of Historic Places listings in Methuen, Massachusetts
- National Register of Historic Places listings in Essex County, Massachusetts
