= House at 136 Hampstead Street =

Historic house in Massachusetts, United States

- U.S. National Register of Historic Places
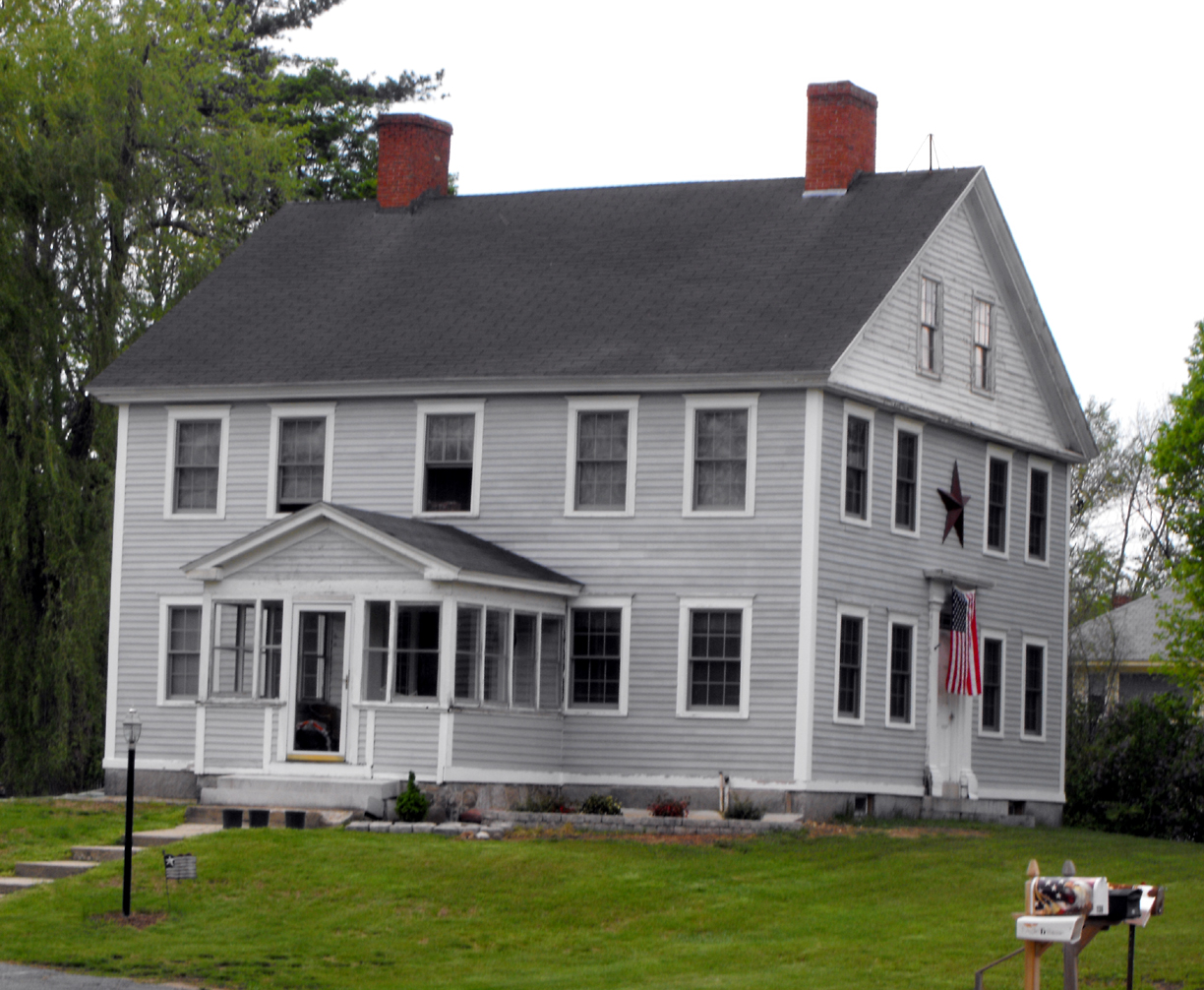

- Location within Massachusetts Location within the United States
- Location: Methuen, Massachusetts
- Coordinates: 42°46′33″N 71°10′26″W
- Built: 1840
- Architectural style: Greek Revival
- MPS: Methuen MRA
- NRHP reference No.: 84002377
- Added to NRHP: June 20, 1984

The House at 136 Hampstead Street in Methuen, Massachusetts is a well-preserved rural Greek Revival farmhouse. It is a nearly square 2 1/2-story wood-frame house, with a side gable roof and clapboard siding. It has four window bays on the gable end, two on each side of a central doorway, and five bays on the longer side. The doorway on the gable end retains a decorative surround with a glazed transom and narrow pilasters. The house is representative of rural agricultural development that took place in Methuen to provide goods to the growing cities of Lawrence and Lowell.

The house was listed on the National Register of Historic Places in 1984.

== See also ==
- National Register of Historic Places listings in Methuen, Massachusetts
- National Register of Historic Places listings in Essex County, Massachusetts
