= Terence Dolan House =

Historic house in Massachusetts, United States

- U.S. National Register of Historic Places
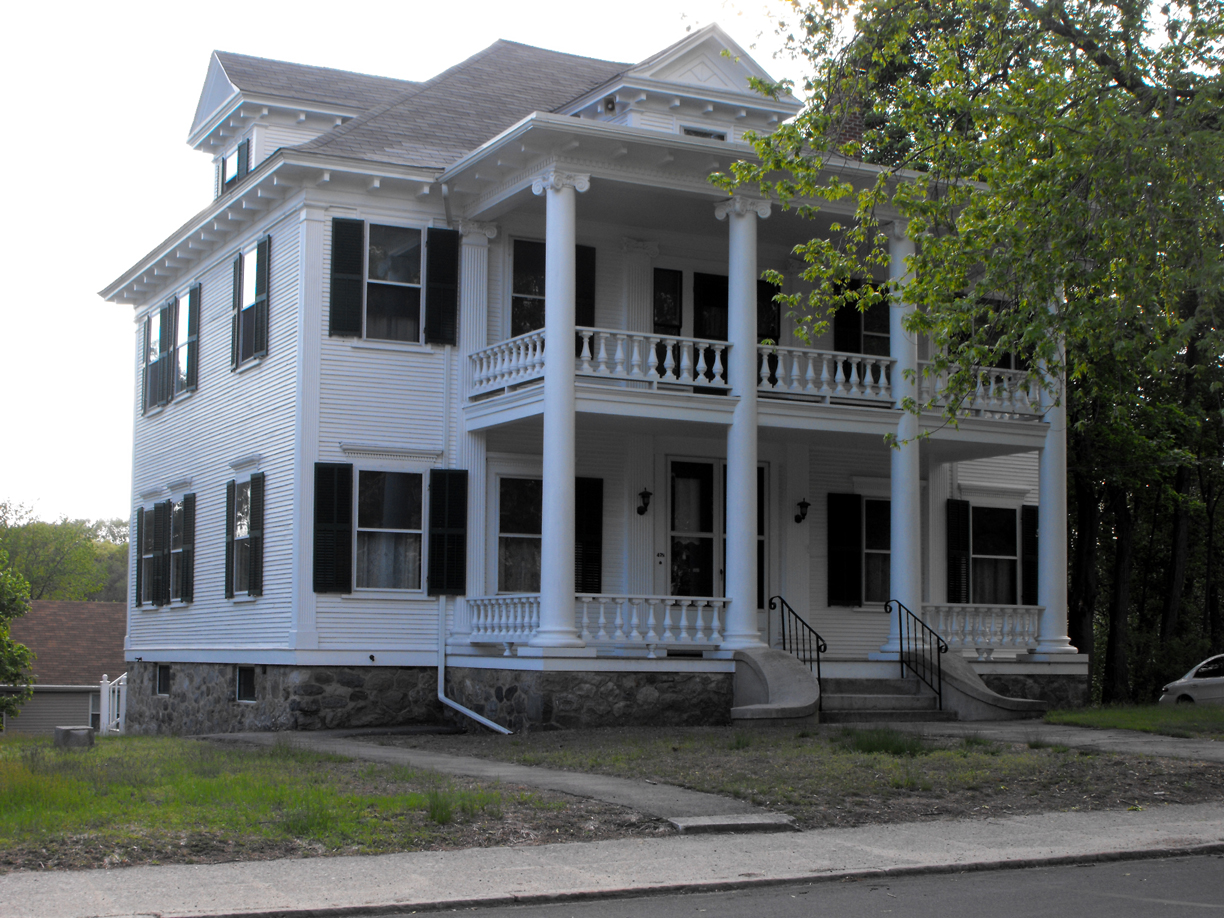
- Terence Dolan House

- Location within Massachusetts Location within the United States
- Location: Methuen, Massachusetts
- Coordinates: 42°43′30″N 71°9′29″W
- Area: less than one acre
- Built: 1900
- Architectural style: Georgian Revival
- MPS: Methuen MRA
- NRHP reference No.: 84002323
- Added to NRHP: January 20, 1984

The Terence Dolan House is a historic house at 478 Prospect Street in Methuen, Massachusetts, United States. Built in 1900, it is a high-style local example of Colonial Revival architecture. The house was listed on the National Register of Historic Places in 1984.

== Description and history ==
The Dolan House is set at the northwest corner of Prospect and Curtis Streets in the Fair Oaks neighborhood of Methuen, located north of its central business district. The Fair Oaks area is characterized by high quality turn-of-the-century residences built for people working in nearby Lawrence, and wealthy local businessmen. The house is a two-story wood-frame structure, five bays wide and three deep, with a hip roof, clapboard siding, and a stone foundation. Its most prominent feature is a two-story porch, which extends across three bays of the front facade, with full height Doric columns and turned balusters. The roof is pierced by gable-roofed dormers with small sash windows, and a dentil course below the dormer gable pediments, a detail also appearing on the main cornice. The main entrance is framed by fluted pilasters, and the first-level sash windows have simple carved headers. This house was built for Terence Dolan, a mason by trade.

== See also ==
- National Register of Historic Places listings in Methuen, Massachusetts
