= House at 491 Prospect Street =

Historic house in Massachusetts, United States

- U.S. National Register of Historic Places
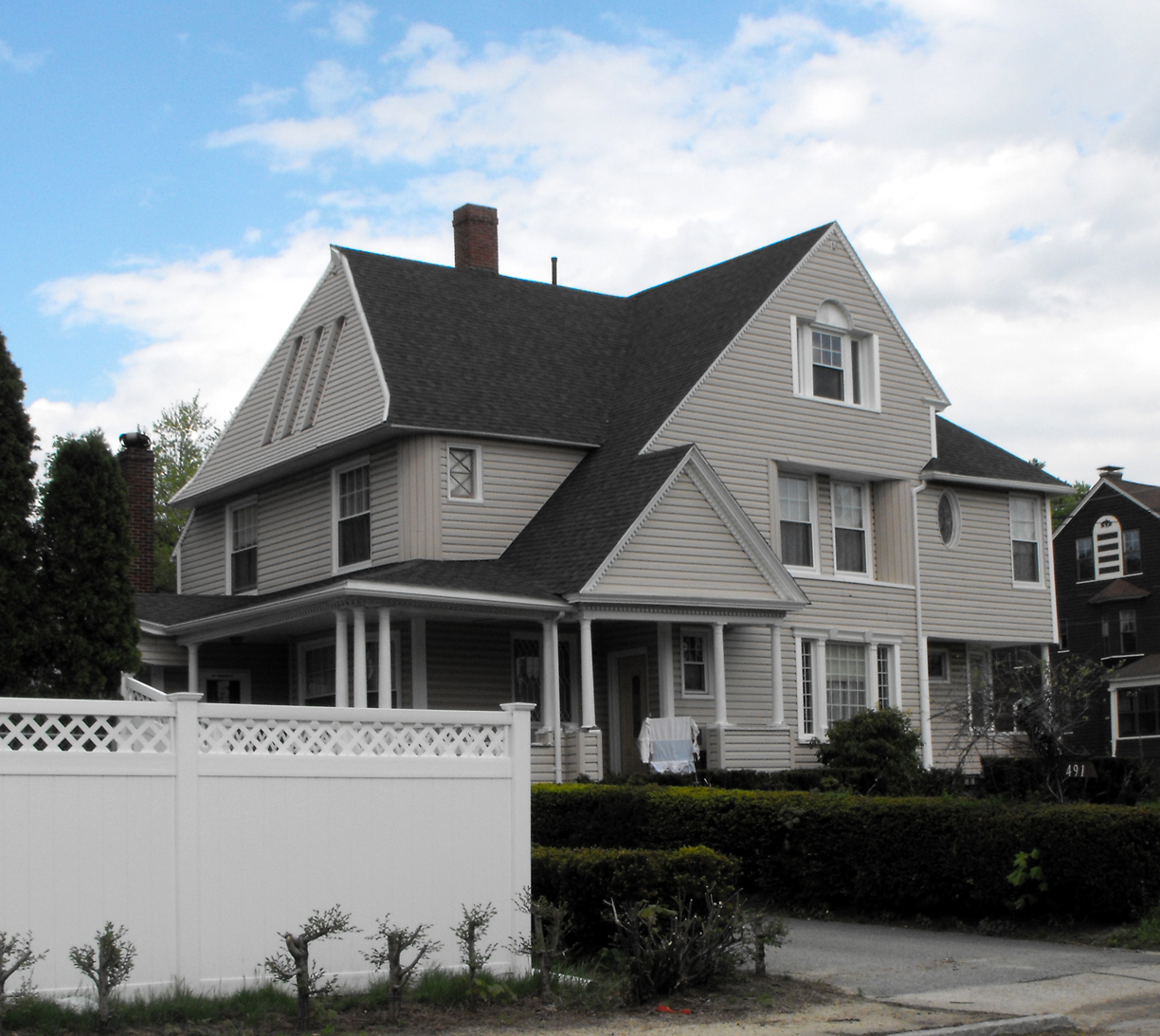

- Location within Massachusetts Location within the United States
- Location: Methuen, Massachusetts
- Coordinates: 42°43′39″N 71°9′33″W
- Built: 1900
- Architectural style: Shingle Style
- MPS: Methuen MRA
- NRHP reference No.: 84002396
- Added to NRHP: January 20, 1984

The House at 491 Prospect Street in Methuen, Massachusetts is locally significant as an excellent example of a Shingle Style house of the type built for well-to-do businessmen in Methuen and Lawrence around the turn of the 20th century. The three-story wood-frame building was built c. 1900. One of its principal decorative features at the time of its listing on the National Register of Historic Places in 1984 was a Palladian window in the gable, around which square-cut shingles had been arranged in a keystone motif. This detail has since been lost due to the application of new siding.

Other details of note include curved exterior corners, a window recessed in a bay with curved walls, and small decorative rectangular and oval windows. The property also includes a period carriage house.

== See also ==
- National Register of Historic Places listings in Methuen, Massachusetts
- National Register of Historic Places listings in Essex County, Massachusetts
