= House at 526 Prospect Street =

Historic house in Massachusetts, United States

- U.S. National Register of Historic Places
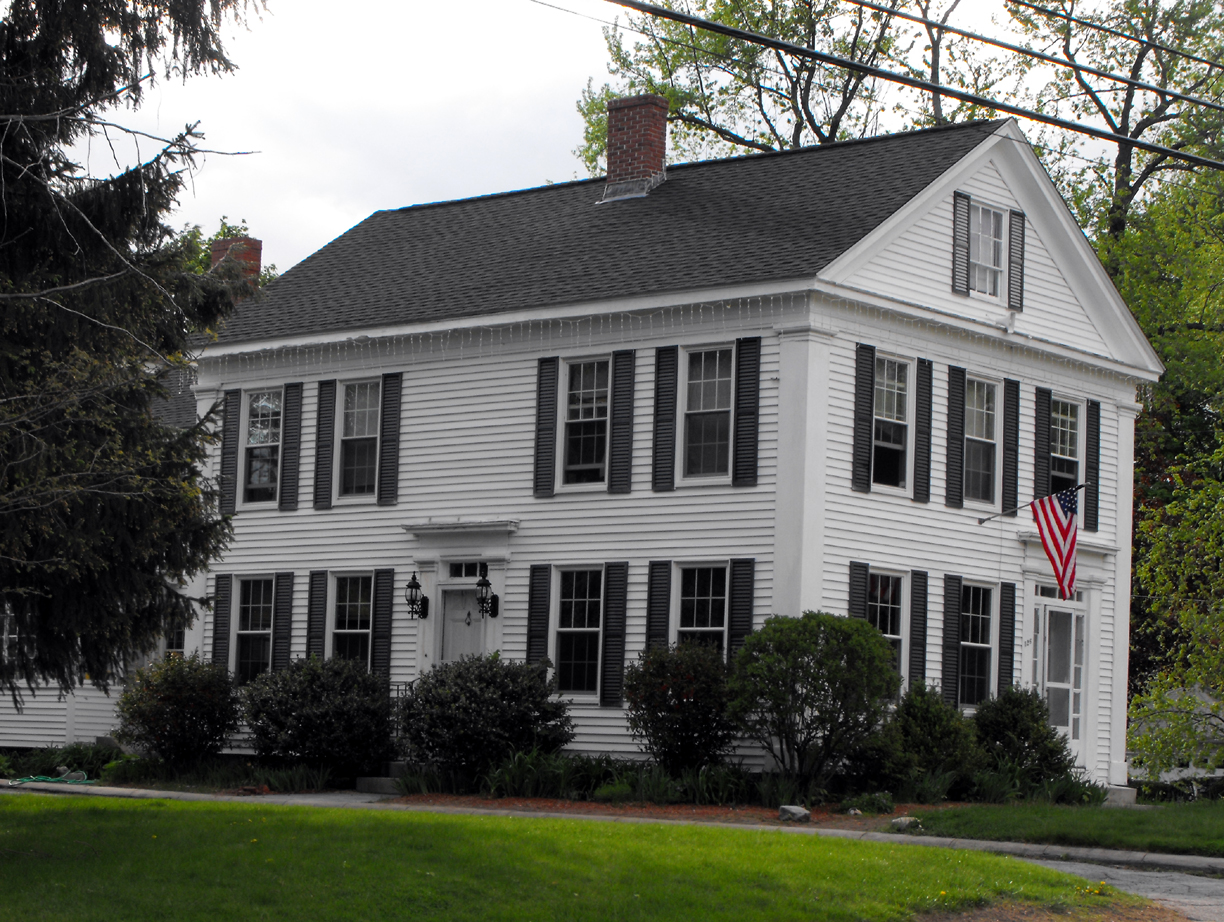

- Location within Massachusetts Location within the United States
- Location: 526 Prospect St., Methuen, Massachusetts
- Coordinates: 42°43′43″N 71°9′42″W
- Built: 1840
- Architectural style: Greek Revival
- MPS: Methuen MRA
- NRHP reference No.: 84002394
- Added to NRHP: January 20, 1984

The house at 526 Prospect Street in Methuen, Massachusetts is a well preserved Greek Revival house built about 1840. It is located near the city's historic early center, and was probably first occupied by farmers. The property was listed on the National Register of Historic Places in 1984.

== Description and history ==
526 Prospect Street is located in a suburban residential area of eastern Methuen, at the southwest corner of Prospect Street and Florence Road. Prospect Street is a historically old road, found on early town maps as a through road. The house is a 2 1/2-story wood-frame building with a gabled roof, center chimney, clapboard siding and a granite foundation. The main five-bay facade is oriented facing south, with a secondary facade facing east toward the road. The building corners are pilastered, rising to an encircling entablature, and (on the eastern gable end) a fully pedimented gable. Doorways on both facades feature entablatures and transom windows above; the side entrance also has sidelights.

The house was built about 1840, in an area that saw development early in the city's history, because of its location on a main road leading to the former town center. This house is one of the city's finer examples of Greek Revival architecture. Its first occupants were probably farmers, whose products would have been delivered to more densely built areas of Methuen and Lawrence.

== See also ==
- National Register of Historic Places listings in Methuen, Massachusetts
- National Register of Historic Places listings in Essex County, Massachusetts
