= House at 23 East Street =

Historic house in Massachusetts, United States

- U.S. National Register of Historic Places
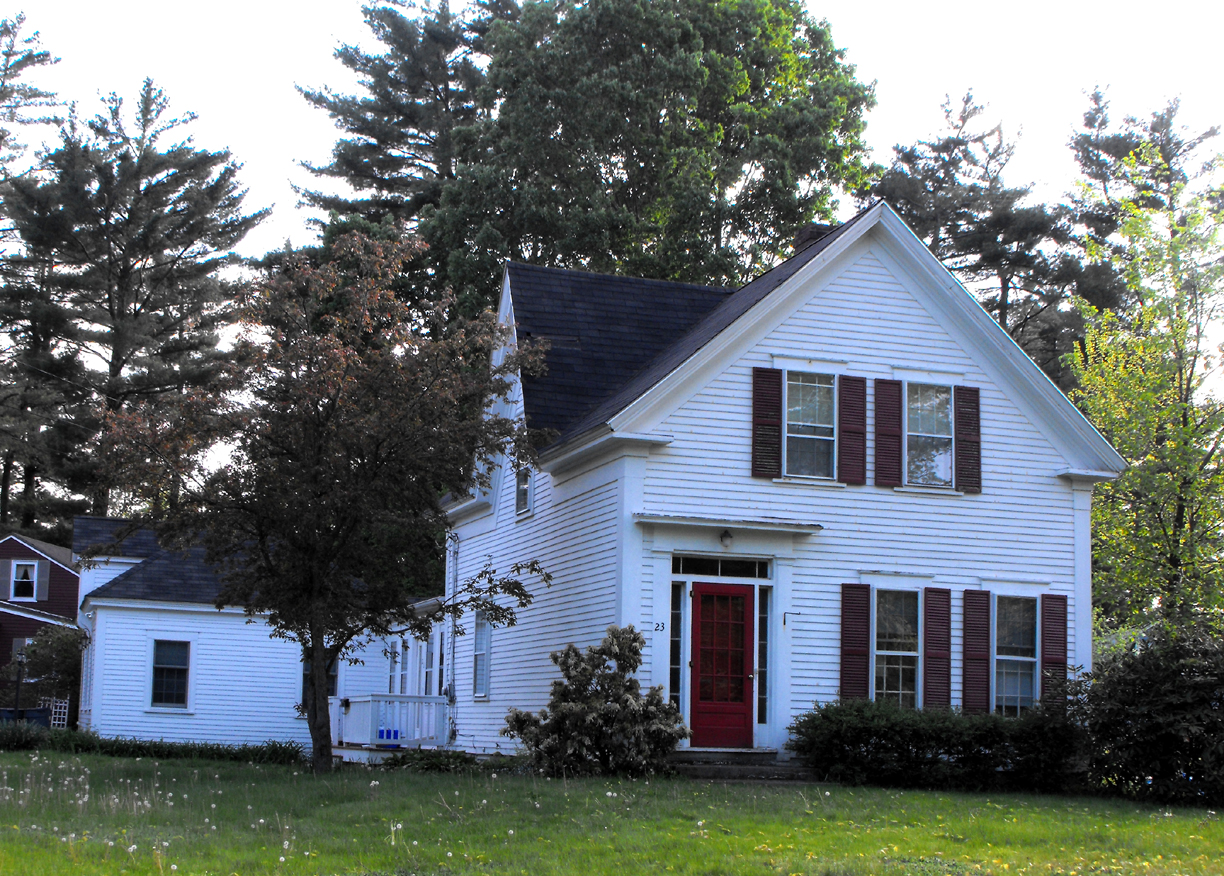
- House at 23 East Street

- Location within Massachusetts Location within the United States
- Location: Methuen, Massachusetts
- Coordinates: 42°43′34″N 71°10′39″W
- Built: 1840
- Architectural style: Greek Revival
- MPS: Methuen MRA
- NRHP reference No.: 84002382
- Added to NRHP: January 20, 1984

The House at 23 East Street in Methuen, Massachusetts is a well preserved Greek Revival cottage. Built in c. 1840, it is a 1 1/2-story three bay wood-frame structure with a side hall entry and a front-facing gable end. The main entrance is flanked by full-length sidelight windows and topped by a transom window. Houses similar to this were generally occupied by craftsmen such as boot-, shoe-, and hatmakers. Before large-scale industrialization they were scattered throughout the town.

The house was listed on the National Register of Historic Places in 1984.

== See also ==
- National Register of Historic Places listings in Methuen, Massachusetts
- National Register of Historic Places listings in Essex County, Massachusetts
