= House at 9 Park Street =

Historic house in Massachusetts, United States

- U.S. National Register of Historic Places
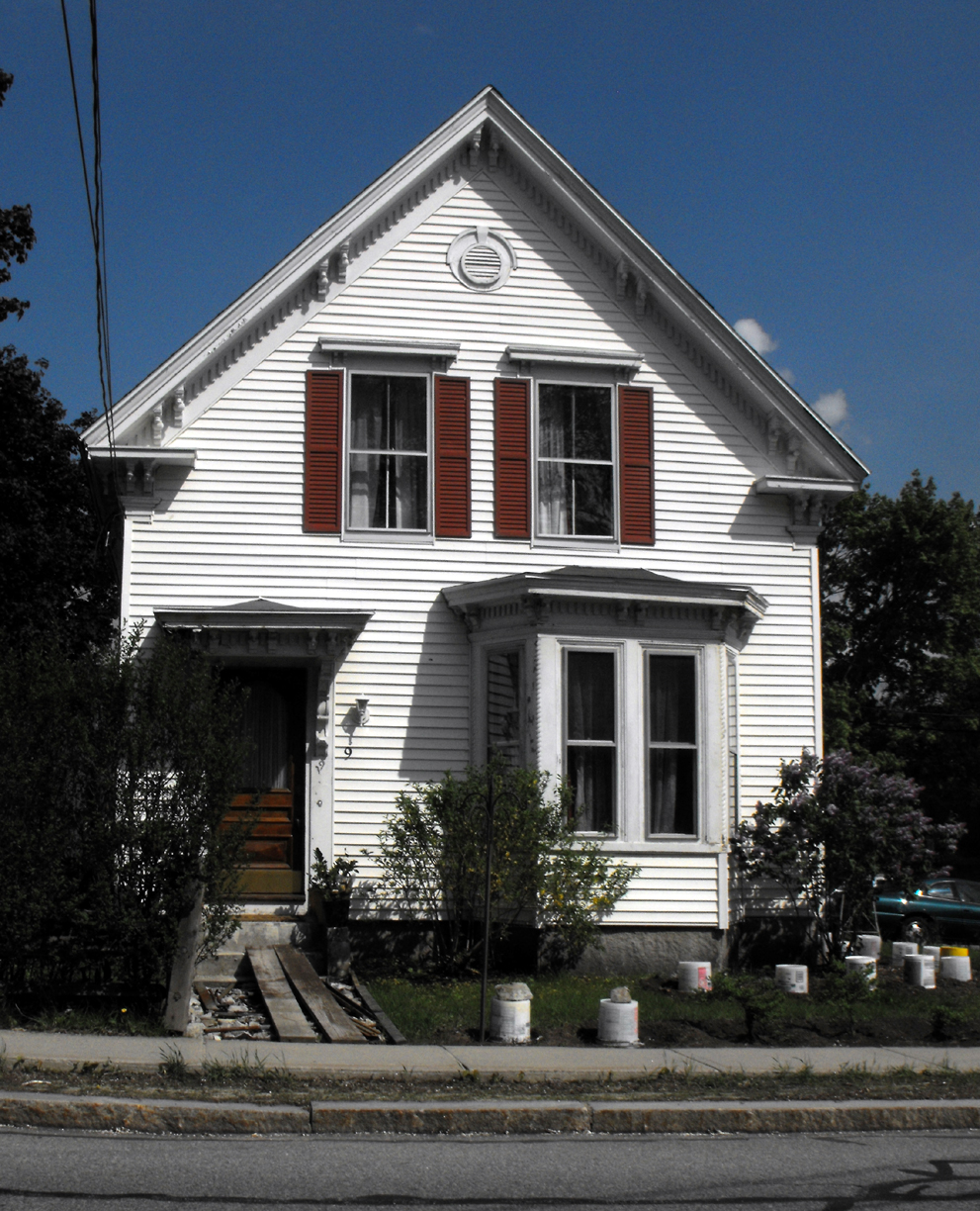

- Location within Massachusetts Location within the United States
- Location: 9 Park Street, Methuen, Massachusetts
- Coordinates: 42°43′35″N 71°11′6″W
- Built: 1875
- Architectural style: Italianate
- MPS: Methuen MRA
- NRHP reference No.: 84002384
- Added to NRHP: January 20, 1984

House at 9 Park Street is a historic house in Methuen, Massachusetts.

According to the assessor's records the house at 9 Park Street was built in 1876 at a value of $950. A notice in the Methuen Transcript says local builder Albert Fales built an addition in 1880. according to an 1885 directory, the first owner was John W. Mann of Tompkins and Mann (paint and oil vendors), 191 Essex Street, Lawrence, Massachusetts. Mrs. Mann still occupied the house as of 1906.

It was added to the National Register of Historic Places in 1984.

== See also ==
- National Register of Historic Places listings in Methuen, Massachusetts
- National Register of Historic Places listings in Essex County, Massachusetts
