= Moses Morse House =

Historic house in Massachusetts, United States

- U.S. National Register of Historic Places
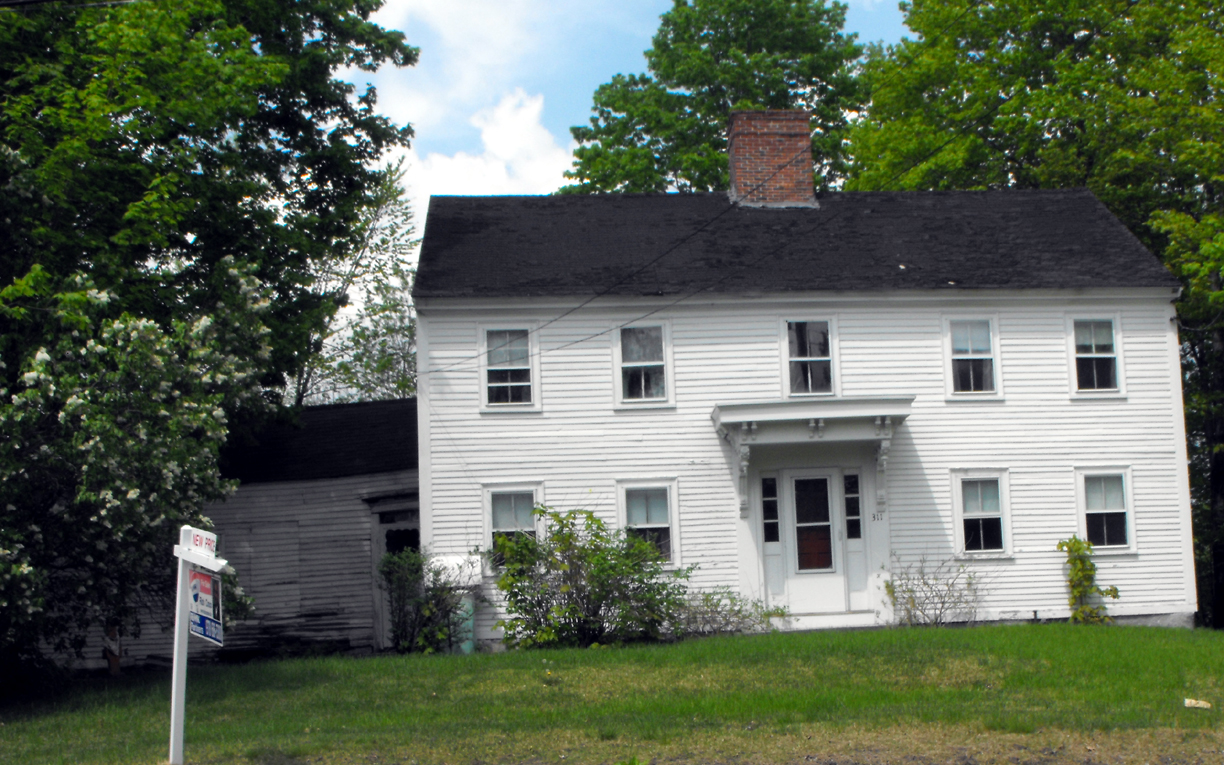

- Location within Massachusetts Location within the United States
- Location: 311 Pelham Street, Methuen, Massachusetts
- Coordinates: 42°43′40″N 71°13′59″W
- Built: 1762
- Architectural style: Georgian
- MPS: Methuen MRA
- NRHP reference No.: 84002404
- Added to NRHP: January 20, 1984

The Moses Morse House is a historic house in Methuen, Massachusetts, USA. It is a rare surviving farmhouse in the town with 18th century origins, with its oldest elements dating to c. 1762. It is a 2½ story wood-frame house with a massive central chimney, and a small single story ell on the left side. The ell appears to date from near the house's original construction, and the chimney is slightly off-center, indicating the house may have been built in stages. The front door is sheltered by an elaborate Italianate portico that is a c. 1870s modification.

The house was listed on the National Register of Historic Places in 1984.

== See also ==
- National Register of Historic Places listings in Methuen, Massachusetts
- National Register of Historic Places listings in Essex County, Massachusetts
