= National Register of Historic Places listings in Methuen, Massachusetts =

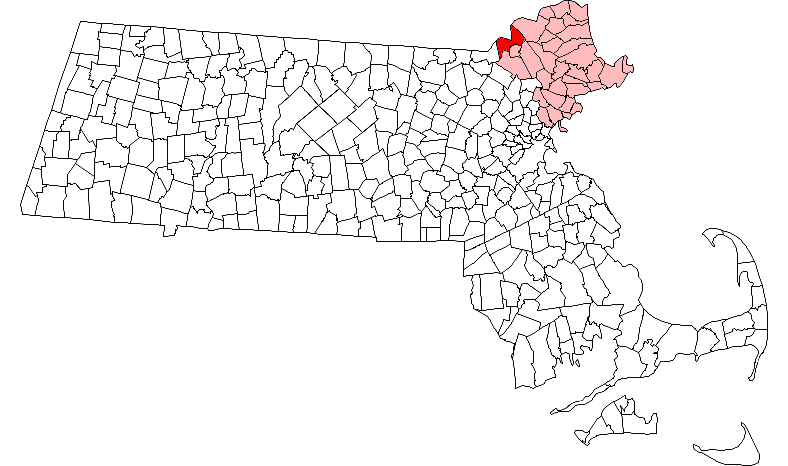
Location of Methuen in Massachusetts

This is intended to be a complete list of the properties and districts on the National Register of Historic Places in Methuen, Massachusetts, United States. The locations of National Register properties and districts for which the latitude and longitude coordinates are included below, may be seen in an online map.

Essex County, of which Methuen is a part, is the location of 471 properties and districts listed on the National Register. Methuen itself is the location of 45 of these properties and districts.

This National Park Service list is complete through NPS recent listings posted May 1, 2026.

== Current listings ==
	Name on the Register	Image	Date listed	Location	City or town	Description
1	Arlington Mills Historic District	Arlington Mills Historic District	January 3, 1985 (#85000023)	Broadway between Manchester, Stafford and Chase Sts. 42°42′56″N 71°10′52″W		Extends into Lawrence
2	Stephen Barker House	Stephen Barker House	January 20, 1984 (#84002307)	165 Haverhill St. 42°42′24″N 71°11′57″W		An imitation of Southern antebellum mansions, it is a well-conserved "country residence", one of several such houses built at the periphery of the Methuen settlement in the mid 19th century.
3	Bellevue Cemetery	Bellevue Cemetery	October 3, 2003 (#03000993)	170 May St. 42°42′38″N 71°11′10″W		Located primarily in Lawrence
4	J.E. Buswell House	J.E. Buswell House	January 20, 1984 (#84002317)	535–537 Prospect St. 42°43′52″N 71°09′43″W		A well-preserved example of Second Empire design and a typical businessman's residence.
5	Daddy Frye's Hill Cemetery	Daddy Frye's Hill Cemetery	January 20, 1984 (#84002320)	East and Arlington Sts. 42°43′31″N 71°09′58″W		Commonly known as Meeting House Hill as it was the site for the First and Second Meeting Houses, 1728–1796 and 1798–1832, respectively.
6	Terence Dolan House	Terence Dolan House	January 20, 1984 (#84002323)	478 Prospect St. 42°43′30″N 71°09′29″W		A large Georgian Revival home, typical of houses built in its neighborhood at the beginning of the twentieth century
7	Double-arch Sandstone Bridge	Double-arch Sandstone Bridge	June 20, 1984 (#84002326)	Hampshire Rd. 42°44′33″N 71°12′29″W		A dry stone arch bridge, built without mortar, over the Spicket River. Parts date back to 1735. Presently in poor condition and in danger of collapse.
8	Emerson House	Emerson House	January 20, 1984 (#84002351)	58 Ayers Village Rd. 42°42′27″N 71°10′19″W		A colonial farm house built in 1750 is well preserved and conserves a portion of the original rural landscape.
9	Capt. Oliver Emerson Homestead	Capt. Oliver Emerson Homestead	January 20, 1984 (#84002347)	133 North St. 42°46′38″N 71°10′50″W		
10	G.B. Emmons House	G.B. Emmons House	January 20, 1984 (#84002353)	283 Broadway; 42°43′44″N 71°11′18″W		
11	First Baptist Church	First Baptist Church	January 20, 1984 (#84002365)	253 Lawrence St. 42°43′41″N 71°11′06″W		Built in 1869, the church is a massive example of the Carpenter Gothic style of architecture.
12	First Church Congregational	First Church Congregational	December 1, 1978 (#78000461)	Pleasant and Stevens Sts. 42°43′46″N 71°11′08″W		
13	Urias Hardy House	Urias Hardy House	January 20, 1984 (#84002367)	50 Brown St. 42°43′23″N 71°10′48″W		
14	House at 15–19 Park Street	House at 15–19 Park Street	January 20, 1984 (#84002388)	15–19 Park St. 42°43′38″N 71°11′05″W		
15	House at 10 Park Street	House at 10 Park Street	January 20, 1984 (#84002385)	10 Park St. 42°43′34″N 71°11′09″W		The E.M. Clark House built around 1880, is a well-preserved Italianate-style single-family residence.
16	House at 113–115 Center Street	House at 113–115 Center Street	January 20, 1984 (#84002381)	113–115 Center St. 42°43′12″N 71°10′49″W		One of the few surviving examples of an early duplex house seen in approximately six locations throughout the Arlington Mills Historic District.
17	House at 13 Annis Street	House at 13 Annis Street	January 20, 1984 (#84002387)	13 Annis St. 42°43′11″N 71°10′44″W		A well-preserved example of the inexpensive dwellings built by speculators for sale to woolen mill workers, a 1 1/2-story gable-roofed worker's cottage in the Arlington Mills Historic District,
18	House at 136 Hampstead Street	House at 136 Hampstead Street	June 20, 1984 (#84002377)	136 Hampstead St. 42°46′35″N 71°10′29″W		
19	House at 23 East Street	House at 23 East Street	January 20, 1984 (#84002382)	23 East St. 42°43′34″N 71°10′39″W		
20	House at 262–264 Pelham Street	House at 262–264 Pelham Street	January 20, 1984 (#84002390)	262–264 Pelham St. 42°43′38″N 71°13′31″W		
21	House at 306 Broadway	House at 306 Broadway	January 20, 1984 (#84002379)	306 Broadway; 42°43′44″N 71°11′22″W		
22	House at 4 Birch Avenue	House at 4 Birch Avenue	January 20, 1984 (#84002374)	4 Birch Ave. 42°43′40″N 71°08′58″W		
23	House at 491 Prospect Street	House at 491 Prospect Street	January 20, 1984 (#84002396)	491 Prospect St. 42°43′39″N 71°09′33″W		
24	House at 50 Pelham Street	House at 50 Pelham Street	January 20, 1984 (#84002392)	50 Pelham St. 42°43′32″N 71°11′34″W		
25	House at 526 Prospect Street	House at 526 Prospect Street	January 20, 1984 (#84002394)	526 Prospect St. 42°43′45″N 71°09′40″W		
26	House at 9 Park Street	House at 9 Park Street	January 20, 1984 (#84002384)	9 Park St. 42°43′35″N 71°11′06″W		
27	Johnson House	Johnson House	January 20, 1984 (#84002398)	8 Ditson Pl. 42°43′38″N 71°11′13″W		
28	Lawrence Street Cemetery	Lawrence Street Cemetery	January 20, 1984 (#84002399)	Lawrence St. 42°43′39″N 71°10′57″W		
29	Methuen Memorial Music Hall	Methuen Memorial Music Hall	December 14, 1978 (#78000462)	192 Broadway; 42°43′30″N 71°11′08″W		
30	Methuen Water Works	Methuen Water Works	January 20, 1984 (#84002403)	Cross St. 42°44′23″N 71°12′53″W		
31	Moses Morse House	Moses Morse House	January 20, 1984 (#84002404)	311 Pelham St. 42°43′40″N 71°14′01″W		
32	Nevins Memorial Library	Nevins Memorial Library	January 20, 1984 (#84002407)	305 Broadway; 42°43′52″N 71°11′25″W		
33	Henry C. Nevins Home for Aged and Incurables	Henry C. Nevins Home for Aged and Incurables	January 20, 1984 (#84002406)	110 Broadway; 42°43′16″N 71°10′58″W		Still in operation as the Nevins Nursing & Rehabilitation Centre.
34	Old Town Farm	Old Town Farm	January 20, 1984 (#84002413)	430 Pelham St. 42°44′17″N 71°14′33″W		
35	Park Lodge	Park Lodge	January 20, 1984 (#84002414)	257 Lawrence St. 42°43′40″N 71°11′08″W		
36	Joseph Perkins House	Joseph Perkins House	January 20, 1984 (#84002416)	297 Howe St. 42°45′40″N 71°10′08″W		
37	Pleasant-High Historic District	Pleasant-High Historic District	June 20, 1984 (#84002417)	Roughly bounded by Broadway, High, Vine, Charles, and Pleasant Sts. 42°43′47″N 71°11′09″W		
38	Searles High School	Searles High School	January 20, 1984 (#84002431)	41 Pleasant St. 42°43′48″N 71°11′02″W		
39	James E. Simpson House	James E. Simpson House	January 20, 1984 (#84002432)	606 Prospect St. 42°44′17″N 71°09′59″W		An American Craftsman Style bungalow
40	Spicket Falls Historic District	Spicket Falls Historic District	June 20, 1984 (#84002435)	Roughly bounded by the Spicket River, Railroad, Pelham, Hampshire, Broadway and Osgood Sts. 42°43′36″N 71°11′21″W		
41	Asie Swan House	Asie Swan House	January 20, 1984 (#84002437)	669 Prospect St. 42°44′26″N 71°10′01″W		
42	Tenney Castle Gatehouse	Tenney Castle Gatehouse	January 20, 1984 (#84002438)	37 Pleasant St. 42°43′46″N 71°11′04″W		
43	Turnpike House	Turnpike House	January 20, 1984 (#84002439)	314 Broadway; 42°43′47″N 71°11′24″W		The original building no longer exists. It was abandoned and razed.
44	George A. Waldo House	George A. Waldo House	January 20, 1984 (#84002441)	233 Lawrence St. 42°43′39″N 71°11′00″W		
45	Walnut Grove Cemetery	Walnut Grove Cemetery	January 20, 1984 (#84002444)	Grove and Railroads Sts. 42°43′23″N 71°11′27″W		

== See also ==
- List of National Historic Landmarks in Massachusetts
- National Register of Historic Places listings in Essex County, Massachusetts
- National Register of Historic Places listings in Massachusetts
