= Johnson House (Methuen, Massachusetts) =

Historic house in Massachusetts, United States

- U.S. National Register of Historic Places
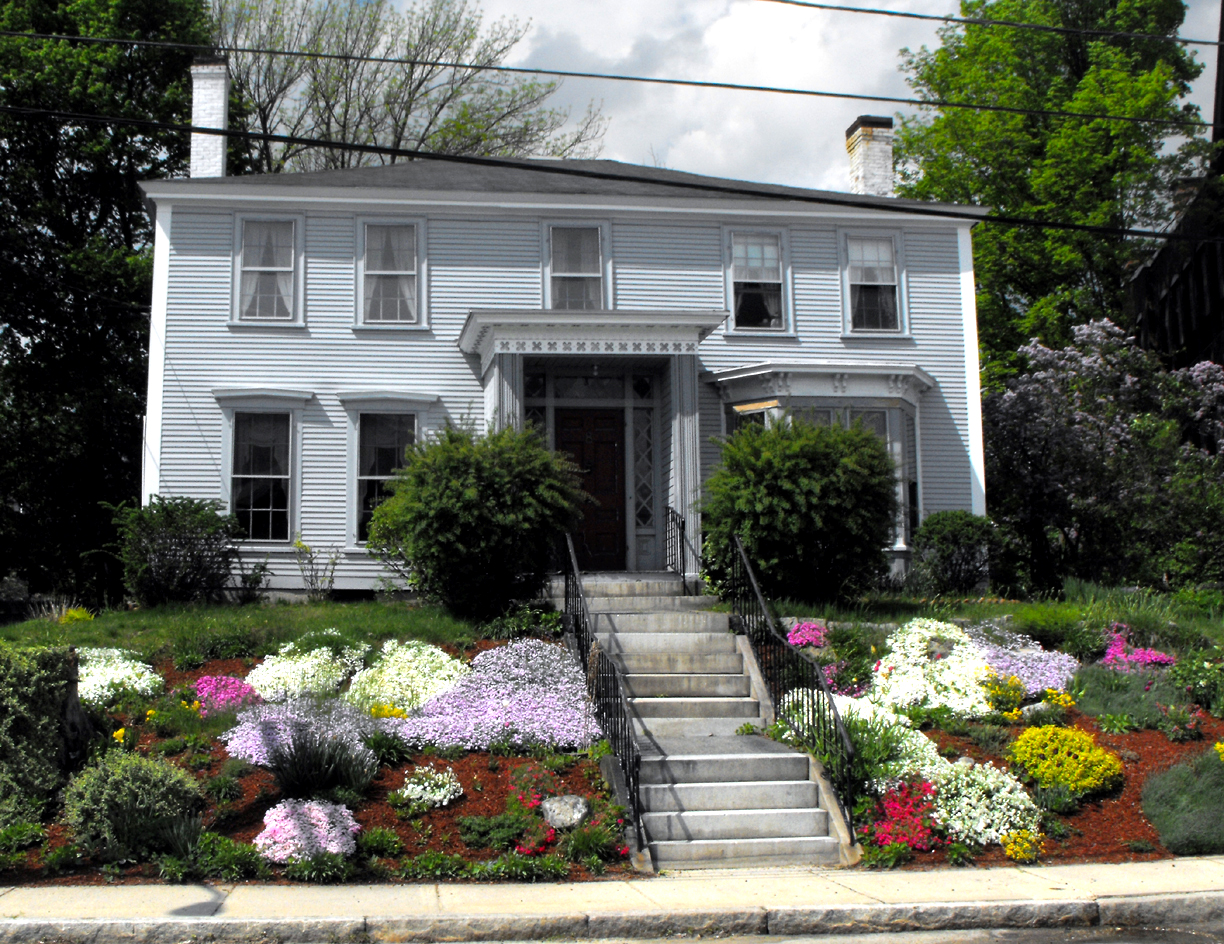

- Location within Massachusetts Location within the United States
- Location: 8 Ditson Place, Methuen, Massachusetts
- Coordinates: 42°43′38″N 71°11′13″W
- Built: 1830
- Architectural style: Federal
- MPS: Methuen MRA
- NRHP reference No.: 84002398
- Added to NRHP: January 20, 1984

The Johnson House is a historic house in Methuen, Massachusetts. It is a 2 1/2-story wood-frame house, five bays wide, with a hip roof and end chimneys. The two bays to the right of the entrance have been replaced by a projecting bay window with Italianate paired brackets at its cornice, and the windows left of the entrance have a curved cornice from the same period. The main entrance portico is also an Italianate addition, with jigsawn entablature and an elaborate door surround with diamond-light sidelight windows. The house was built c. 1830 by Joseph Carleton, and was at that time probably one of the grander Federal style houses in Methuen. By 1885 it was owned by Edward Johnson, a clerk for the Boston and Maine Railroad.

The house was listed on the National Register of Historic Places in 1984.

== See also ==
- National Register of Historic Places listings in Methuen, Massachusetts
- National Register of Historic Places listings in Essex County, Massachusetts
