= House at 4 Birch Avenue =

Historic house in Massachusetts, United States

- U.S. National Register of Historic Places
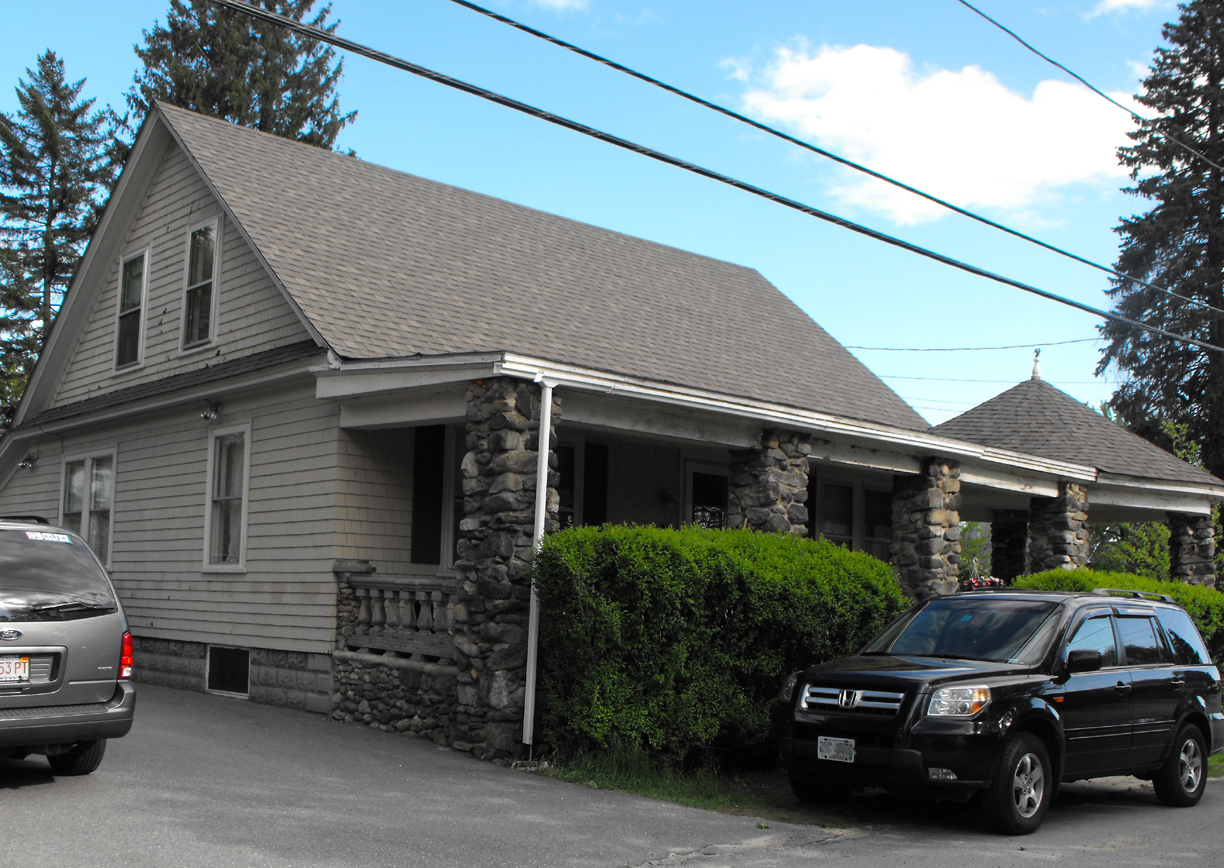
- House at 4 Birch Avenue

- Location within Massachusetts Location within the United States
- Location: Methuen, Massachusetts
- Coordinates: 42°43′40″N 71°8′58″W
- Built: 1910
- Architectural style: Bungalow/Craftsman
- MPS: Methuen MRA
- NRHP reference No.: 84002374
- Added to NRHP: January 20, 1984

The House at 4 Birch Avenue in Methuen, Massachusetts is a Bungalow-style house built c. 1910. Its style, uncommon in the area, is reminiscent of period architecture in California. It is a two-story wood-frame structure with a porch that is faced in fieldstone, and has oversized turned balusters between square fieldstone pillars. On the right side, the porch has a rounded corner that is topped by a conical roof section.

The house was listed on the National Register of Historic Places in 1984.

== See also ==
- National Register of Historic Places listings in Methuen, Massachusetts
- National Register of Historic Places listings in Essex County, Massachusetts
