= James E. Simpson House =

Historic house in Massachusetts, United States

- U.S. National Register of Historic Places
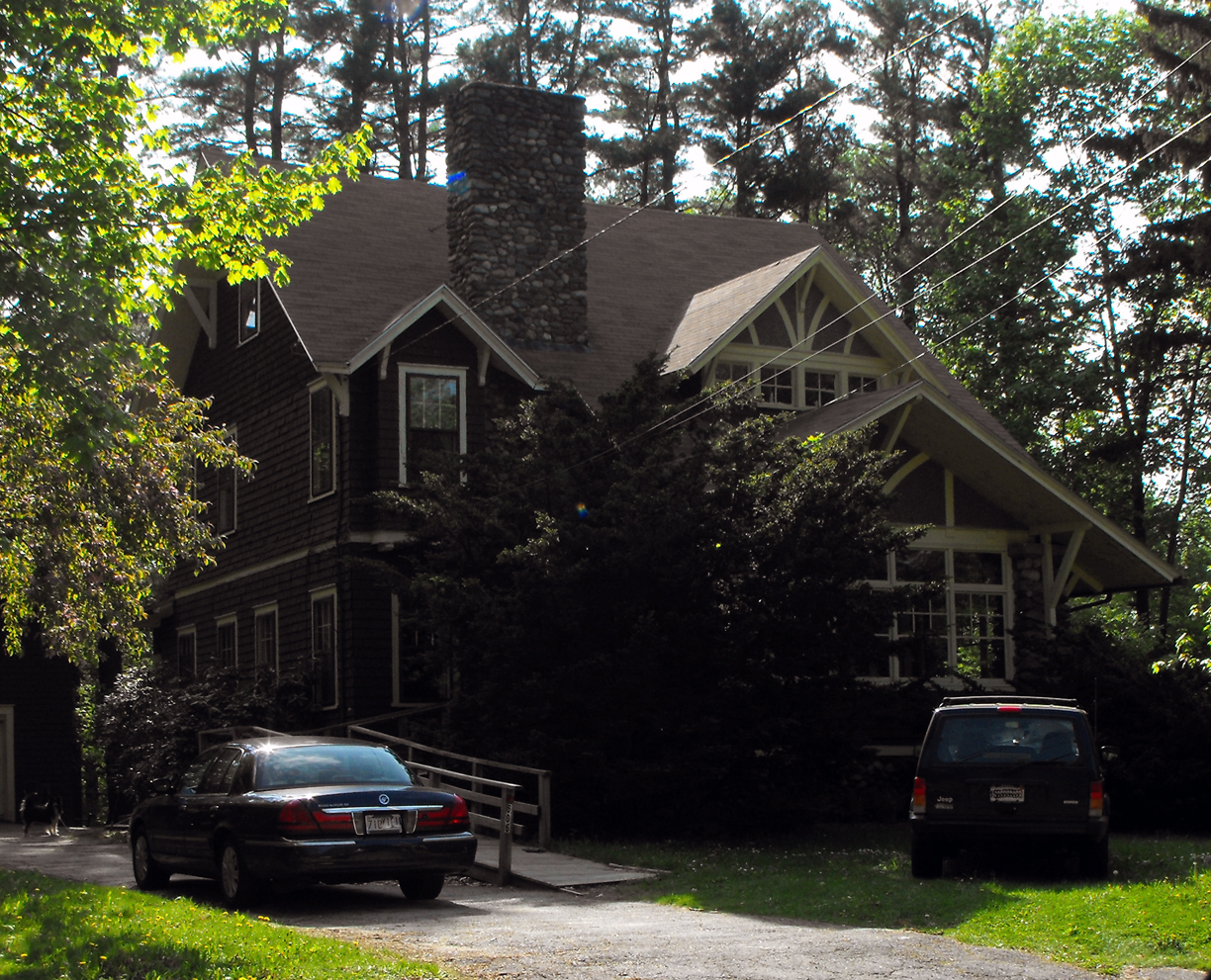

- Location within Massachusetts Location within the United States
- Location: 606 Prospect Street, Methuen, Massachusetts
- Coordinates: 42°44′17″N 71°9′59″W
- Built: 1920
- Architectural style: Bungalow/Craftsman
- MPS: Methuen MRA
- NRHP reference No.: 84002432
- Added to NRHP: January 20, 1984

The James E. Simpson House is a historic house in Methuen, Massachusetts. It is a 2 1/2-story house, finished in wooden clapboards, with a steeply pitched gable roof with exposed trusses. It was built c. 1920, and features typical Craftsman features, including dormers with deep eaves supported by trusses, and half-timbering above the windows. Its porch and foundation are faced in glazed fieldstones, as is its central chimney. The house is Methuen's finest example of the Craftsman/bungalow style.

The house was listed on the National Register of Historic Places in 1984.

== See also ==
- National Register of Historic Places listings in Methuen, Massachusetts
- National Register of Historic Places listings in Essex County, Massachusetts
