= J.E. Buswell House =

Historic house in Massachusetts, United States

- U.S. National Register of Historic Places
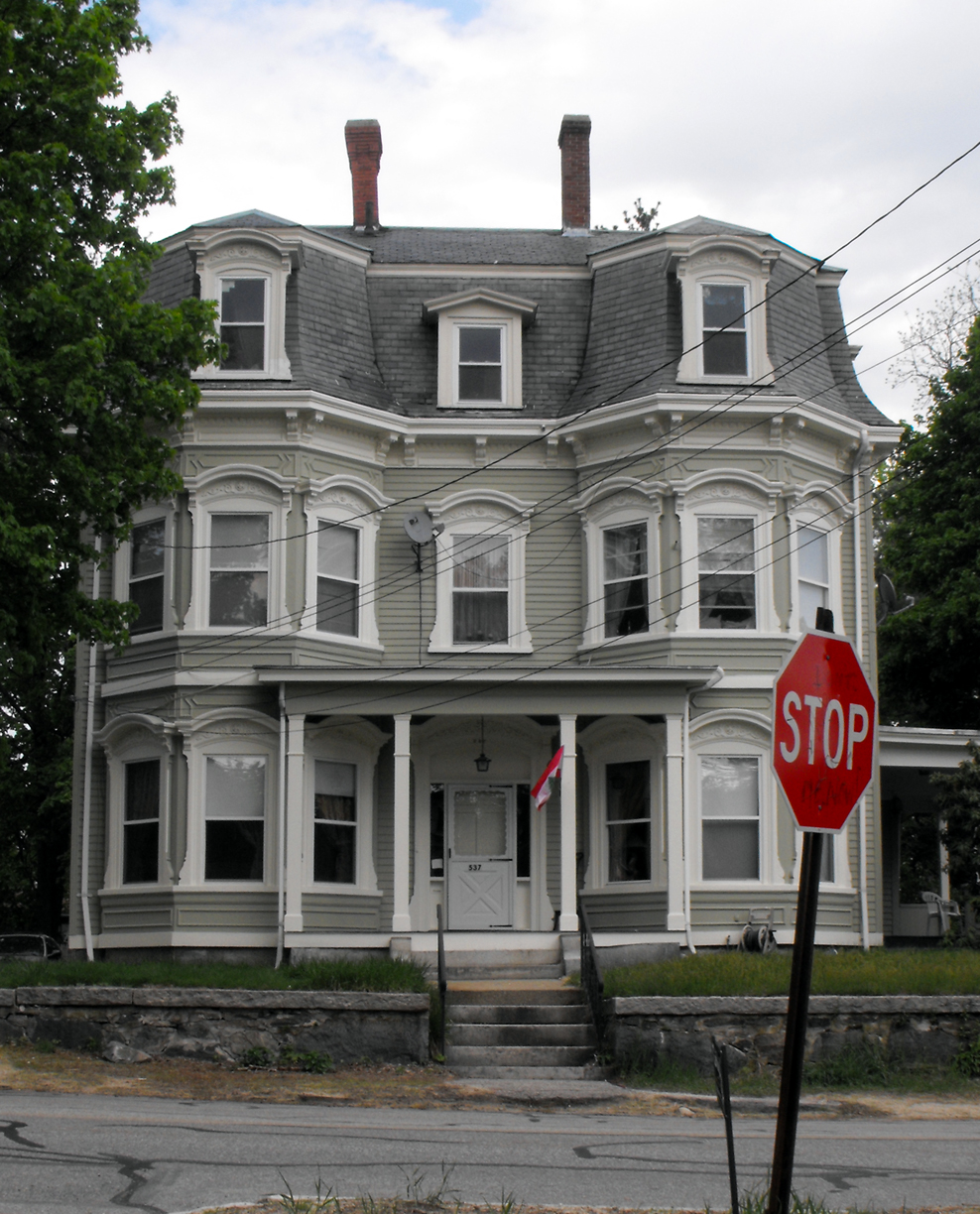

- Location within Massachusetts Location within the United States
- Location: Methuen, Massachusetts
- Coordinates: 42°43′52″N 71°9′43″W
- Built: 1875
- Architectural style: Second Empire
- MPS: Methuen MRA
- NRHP reference No.: 84002317
- Added to NRHP: January 20, 1984

The J.E. Buswell House is a historic two-family house at 535-537 Prospect Street in Methuen, Massachusetts. Built in 1875, it is one of the city's few high quality examples of Second Empire architecture. It was listed on the National Register of Historic Places in 1984.

== Description and history ==
The J.E. Buswell House stands in a suburban residential area of eastern Methuen, on the east side of Prospect Street opposite its junction with Brook Road. Prospect Street is a historic north–south through road that formed an early part of the city's road network. The house is a 2 1/2-story wood-frame structure, with a mansard roof providing a full third floor and a clapboarded exterior. The front facade is defined by projecting polygonal bays which extend into the roof line, which are joined by a single-story porch that shelters the centered entrance. The roof is pierced by segmented-arch dormers on the projections, and a gabled dormer at the center, each with bracketed moulded surrounds. Windows in the bays have similar surrounds, with projecting segmented-arch moulded projections above. The porch is supported by square posts, and projects forward beyond the flanking bays and outward to encompass their inner faces. The entrance is flanked by sidelight windows. The porch roof and main roof each feature decorative brackets.

The house was built in 1875 as a single-family residence, and was only later converted to two-family use. J.E. Buswell was a local businessman and state representative; his house was typical of the Prospect/Brook Street residential area at the time, and is the finest remaining example of Second Empire design in the city.

== See also ==
- National Register of Historic Places listings in Methuen, Massachusetts
