= Urias Hardy House =

Historic house in Massachusetts, United States

- U.S. National Register of Historic Places
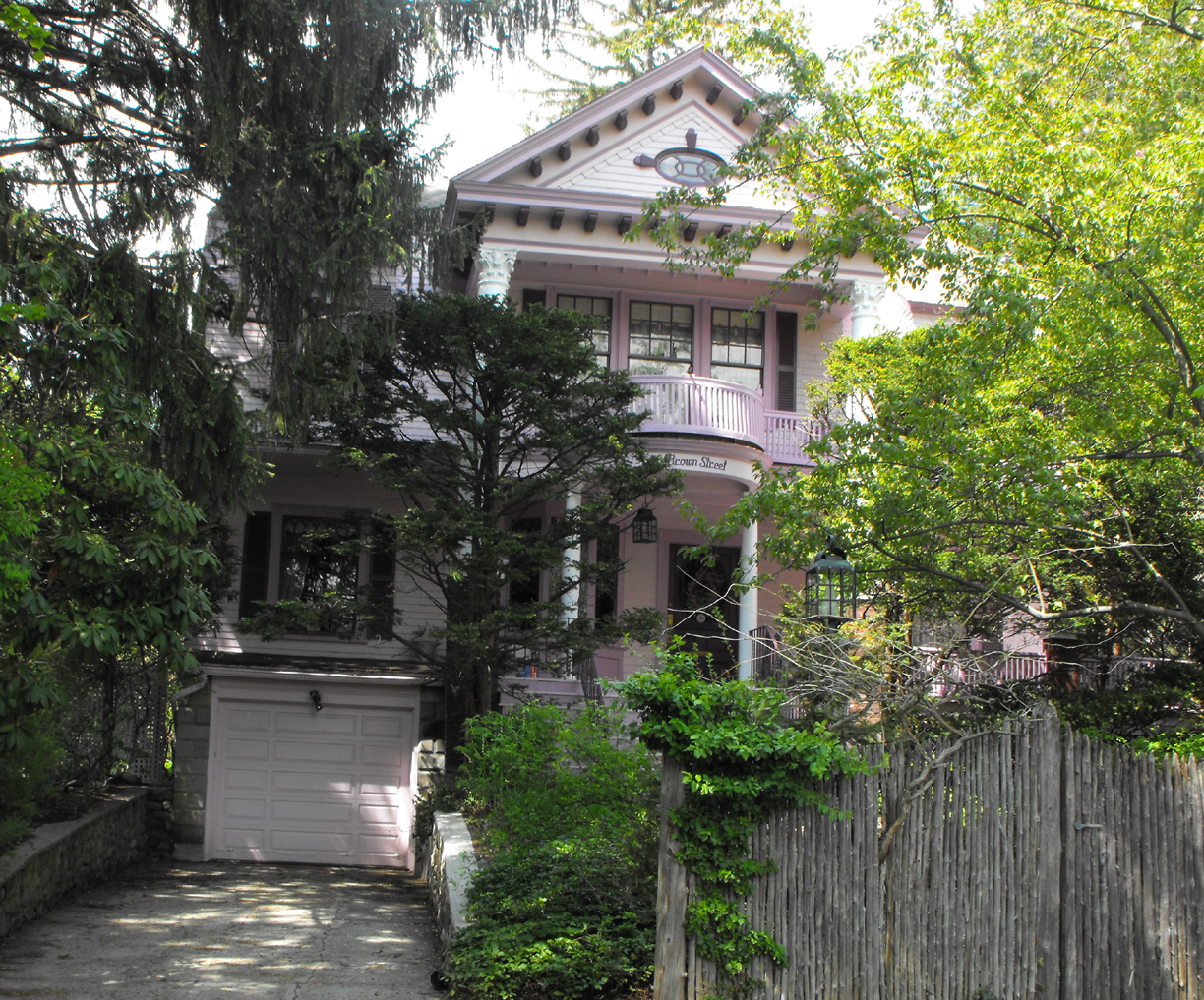

- Location within Massachusetts Location within the United States
- Location: Methuen, Massachusetts
- Coordinates: 42°43′23″N 71°10′48″W
- Built: 1900
- Architectural style: Colonial, Shingle Style
- MPS: Methuen MRA
- NRHP reference No.: 84002367
- Added to NRHP: January 20, 1984

The Urias Hardy House is a historic house at 50 Brown Street in Methuen, Massachusetts.

== Description and history ==
Urias Hardy was an overseer at the nearby Arlington Mills. The Brown Street house, built in 1900, is a fine example of the large single-family home constructed during a time of rapid middle class expansion. The larger more elaborate home is in contrast to the smaller worker houses being built closer to the mills. The Hardy House was built during a period when Methuen became a "bedroom" community for the more urban Lawrence, and is associated with the last period of single-family house building prior to World War II.

It was added to the National Register of Historic Places on January 20, 1984.

== See also ==
- National Register of Historic Places listings in Methuen, Massachusetts
- National Register of Historic Places listings in Essex County, Massachusetts
