= House at 50 Pelham Street =

Historic house in Massachusetts, United States

- U.S. National Register of Historic Places
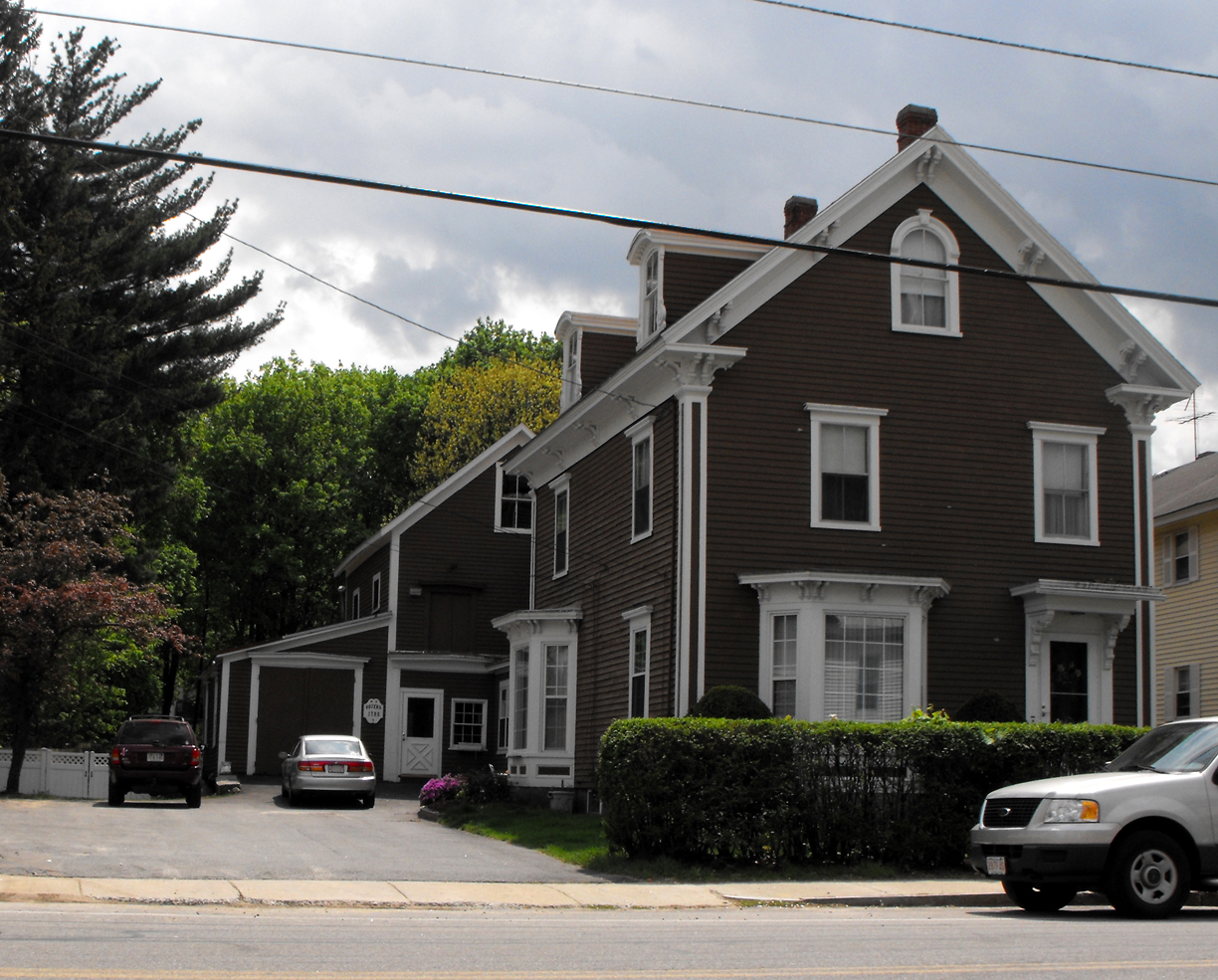

- Location within Massachusetts Location within the United States
- Location: 50 Pelham St., Methuen, Massachusetts
- Coordinates: 42°43′32″N 71°11′34″W
- Built: 1875
- Architectural style: Italianate
- MPS: Methuen MRA
- NRHP reference No.: 84002392
- Added to NRHP: January 20, 1984

The house at 50 Pelham Street in Methuen, Massachusetts is a well-preserved Italianate house and barn. Built sometime in the 1870s, the 2 1/2-story wood-frame house features typical Italianate decorations, including extended bracketed eaves (not just on the roof but also on projecting window lintels), doubled brackets in the gable eaves, and a round-arch window in the gable end. The barn at the back of the property is a simple wood-frame structure that appears to date to the same period as the house.

The house was added to the National Register of Historic Places in 1984.

== See also ==
- National Register of Historic Places listings in Methuen, Massachusetts
- National Register of Historic Places listings in Essex County, Massachusetts
