= George A. Waldo House =

Historic house in Massachusetts, United States

- U.S. National Register of Historic Places
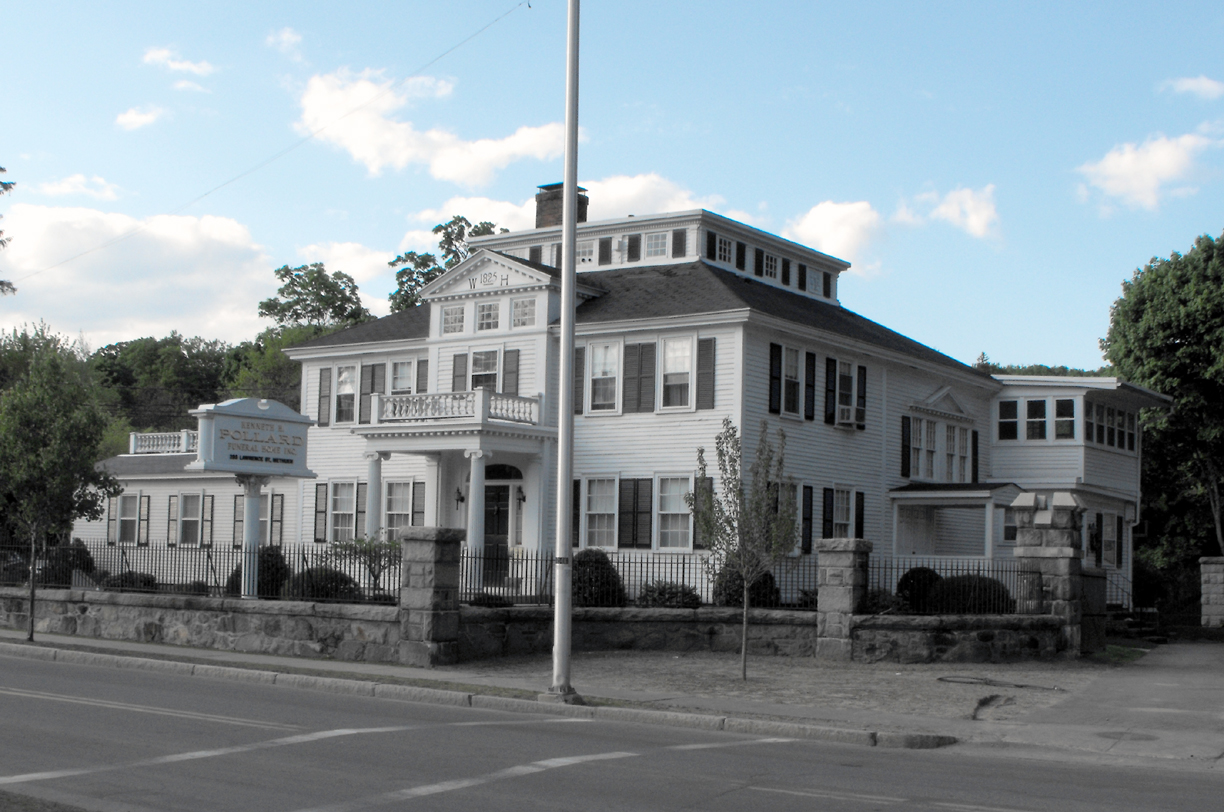
- George A. Waldo House

- Location within Massachusetts Location within the United States
- Location: 233 Lawrence Street, Methuen, Massachusetts
- Coordinates: 42°43′39″N 71°11′0″W
- Built: 1825
- Architectural style: Federal
- MPS: Methuen MRA
- NRHP reference No.: 84002441
- Added to NRHP: January 20, 1984

The George A. Waldo House is a historic house in Methuen, Massachusetts. Built in 1825 and altered somewhat around 1900 by local philanthropist Edward Searles, it is one of Methuen's finest examples of Federal period architecture. It was added to the National Register of Historic Places in 1984, and is currently occupied by the Methuen Family Funeral Home.

== Description and history ==
The Waldo House is set on the north side of Lawrence Street, a short way east of Methuen's central business district, and abutting the former estate of Edward Searles to the north. It is a large 2 1/2-story wood-frame structure, whose main block is five bays wide, and is topped by a hip roof with a distinctive monitor section. The central bay has an early 20th-century Colonial Revival 2 1/2-story projection, with a gabled top and a flat-roofed balconeyed portico supported by Ionic columns. A number of additions, also early 20th century additions, extend to the main block's side and rear. At the western edge of the property there are two massive stone columns of the Corinthian order, which are topped by urns.

The main block of the house was built about 1825 by George A. Waldo, who was apparently in the shoemaking business, and involved in the development of Methuen's central business district. In 1872, the house is listed as being owned by John Low, a local druggist. Mrs. Mary Low sold the house in 1888 to Edward Searles, retaining a lifetime occupancy. In the early 20th century, when Searles was developing his large estate on the property to the north, he made significant additions to this house and property, which included creation of a small park whose entry was marked by the two large columns, which he had transported from New York City. The house became a funeral home in the 1960s.

== See also ==
- National Register of Historic Places listings in Methuen, Massachusetts
- National Register of Historic Places listings in Essex County, Massachusetts
