= Asie Swan House =

Historic house in Massachusetts, United States

- U.S. National Register of Historic Places
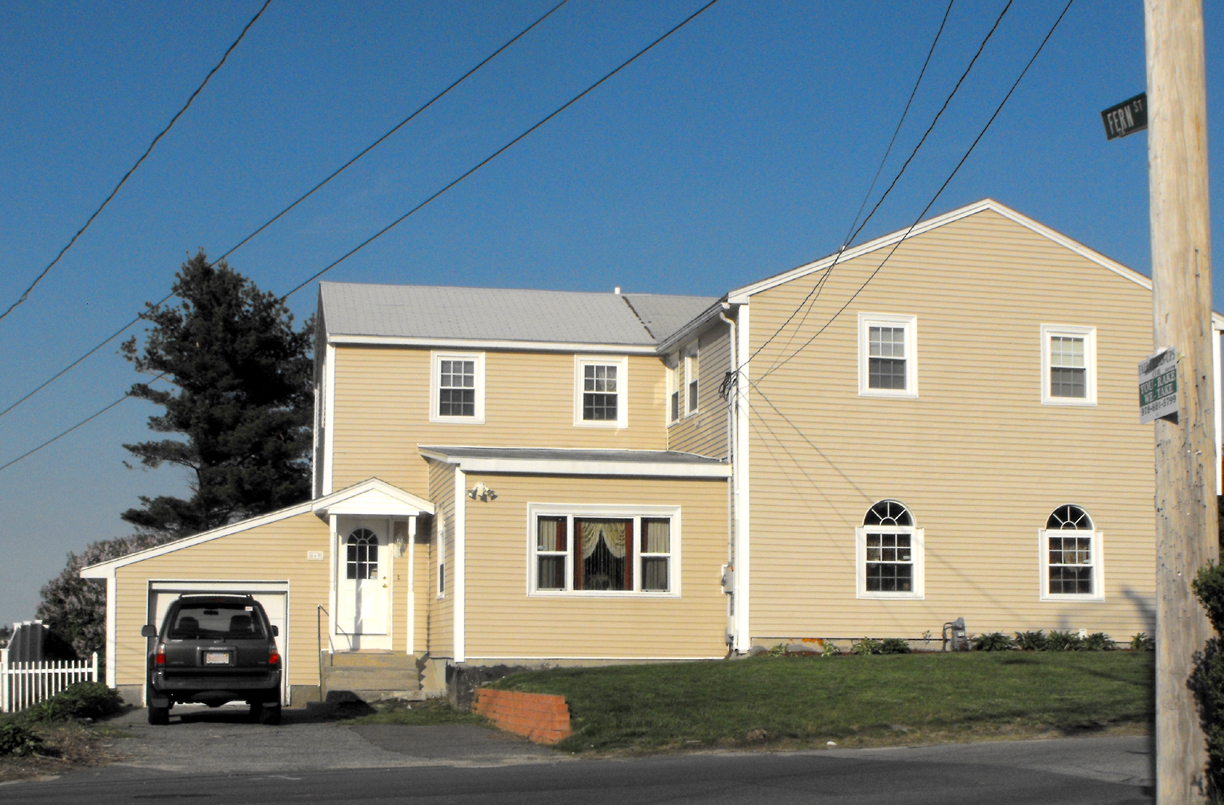
- House at 559 Prospect in 2008

- Location within Massachusetts Location within the United States
- Location: 669 Prospect Street, Methuen, Massachusetts
- Coordinates: 42°44′26″N 71°10′1″W
- Built: 1720
- Architectural style: Colonial
- MPS: Methuen MRA
- NRHP reference No.: 84002437
- Added to NRHP: January 20, 1984

The Asie Swan House is a historic house in Methuen, Massachusetts. Built c. 1720, it is one of the oldest buildings in the city. It is a 1 1/2-story frame house, five bays wide, with clapboard siding, central chimney, and granite foundation. Its central entrance is flanked by sidelight windows. The house originally stood at a location on Prospect Hill in what is now Lawrence, where it was used for the first town meetings beginning in 1726. It was moved in 1808 to its present location.

The house was added to the National Register of Historic Places in 1984.

== See also ==
- National Register of Historic Places listings in Methuen, Massachusetts
- National Register of Historic Places listings in Essex County, Massachusetts
