= Lawrence Street Cemetery =

Historic cemetery in Massachusetts, USA

- U.S. National Register of Historic Places
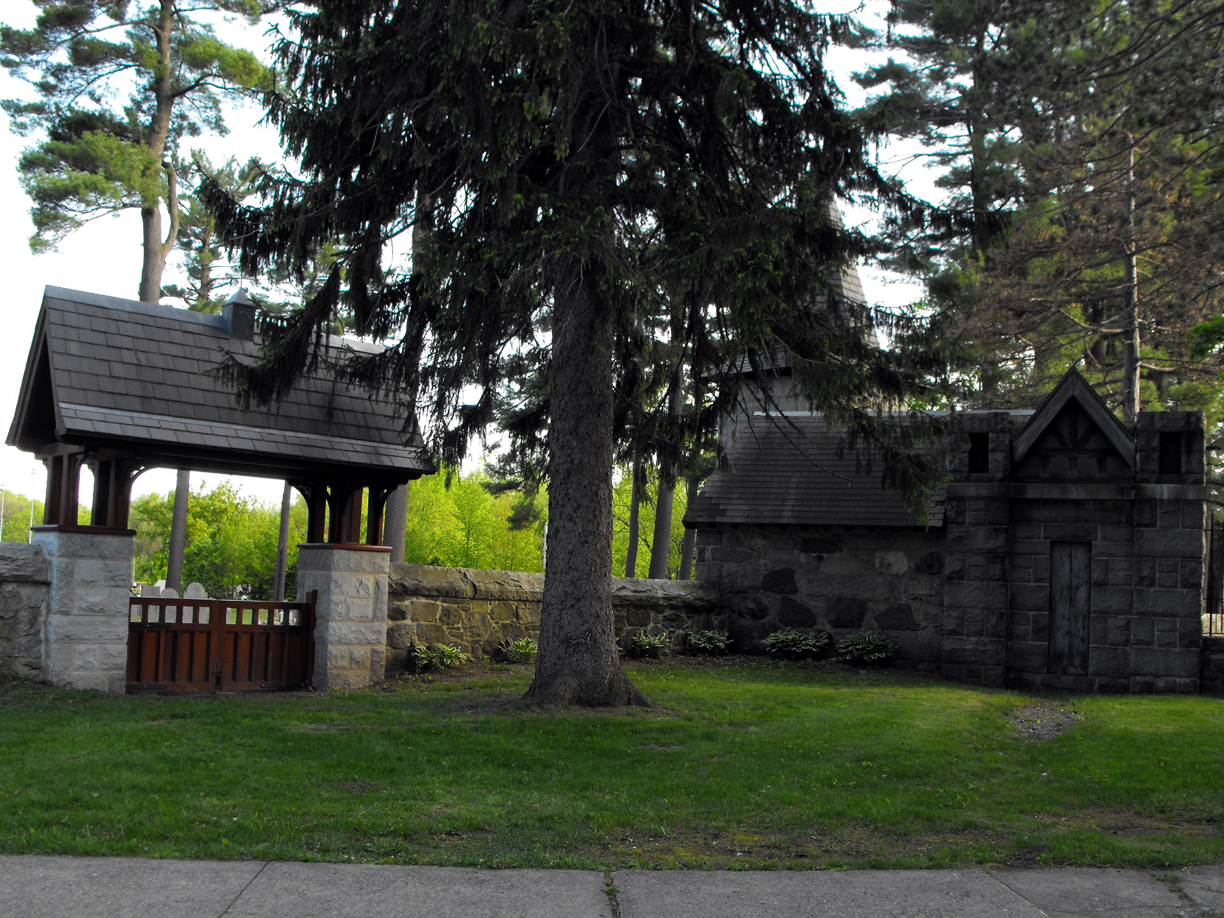

- Location within Massachusetts Location within the United States
- Location: Methuen, Massachusetts
- Coordinates: 42°43′39″N 71°10′57″W
- Built: 1832
- Architectural style: Late Victorian
- MPS: Methuen MRA
- NRHP reference No.: 84002399
- Added to NRHP: January 20, 1984

The Lawrence Street Cemetery, or more commonly known as "the Village Burying Ground", is a historic cemetery on Lawrence Street in Methuen, Massachusetts.

Methuen's third oldest cemetery, it was founded in 1832 when the center of town was shifted west from Meeting House Hill to Gaunt Square. Late in the 19th century, wealthy industrialist Edward Searles built the 8 foot granite wall on the sides facing his estate. In the cemetery rests Searles siblings, parents and wife Mary Hopkins Searles.

The cemetery was listed on the National Register of Historic Places in 1984.

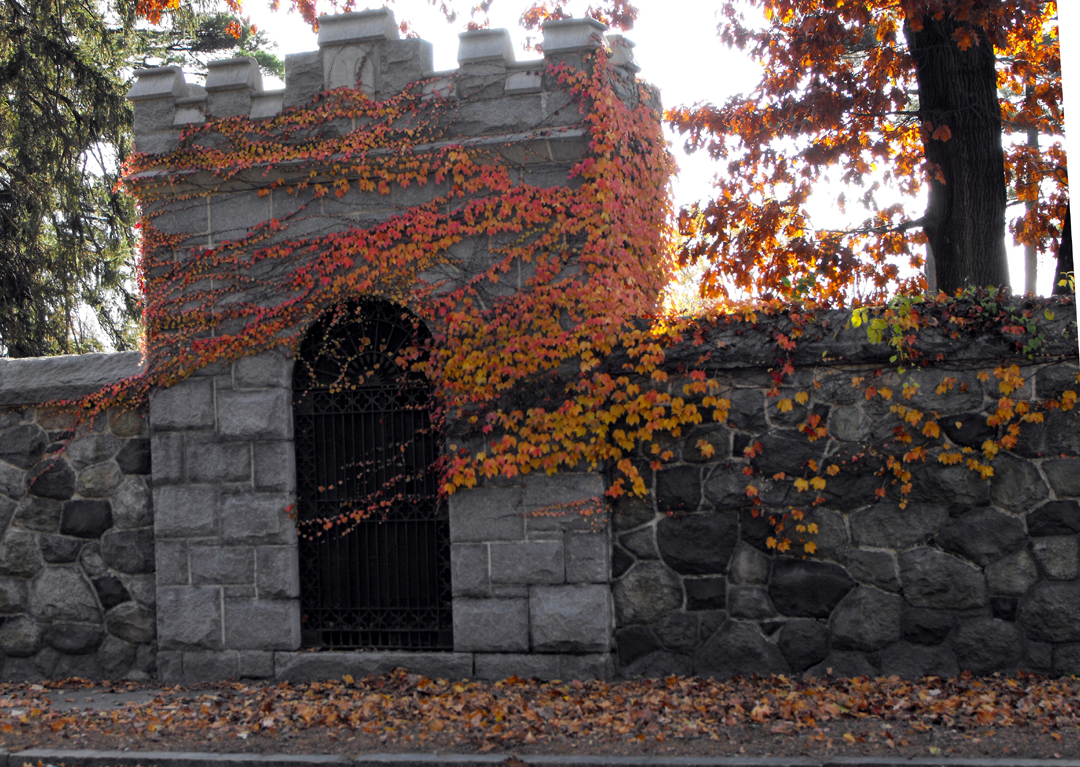
Sign Lawrence Street Cemetery Front Gate, no longer in use

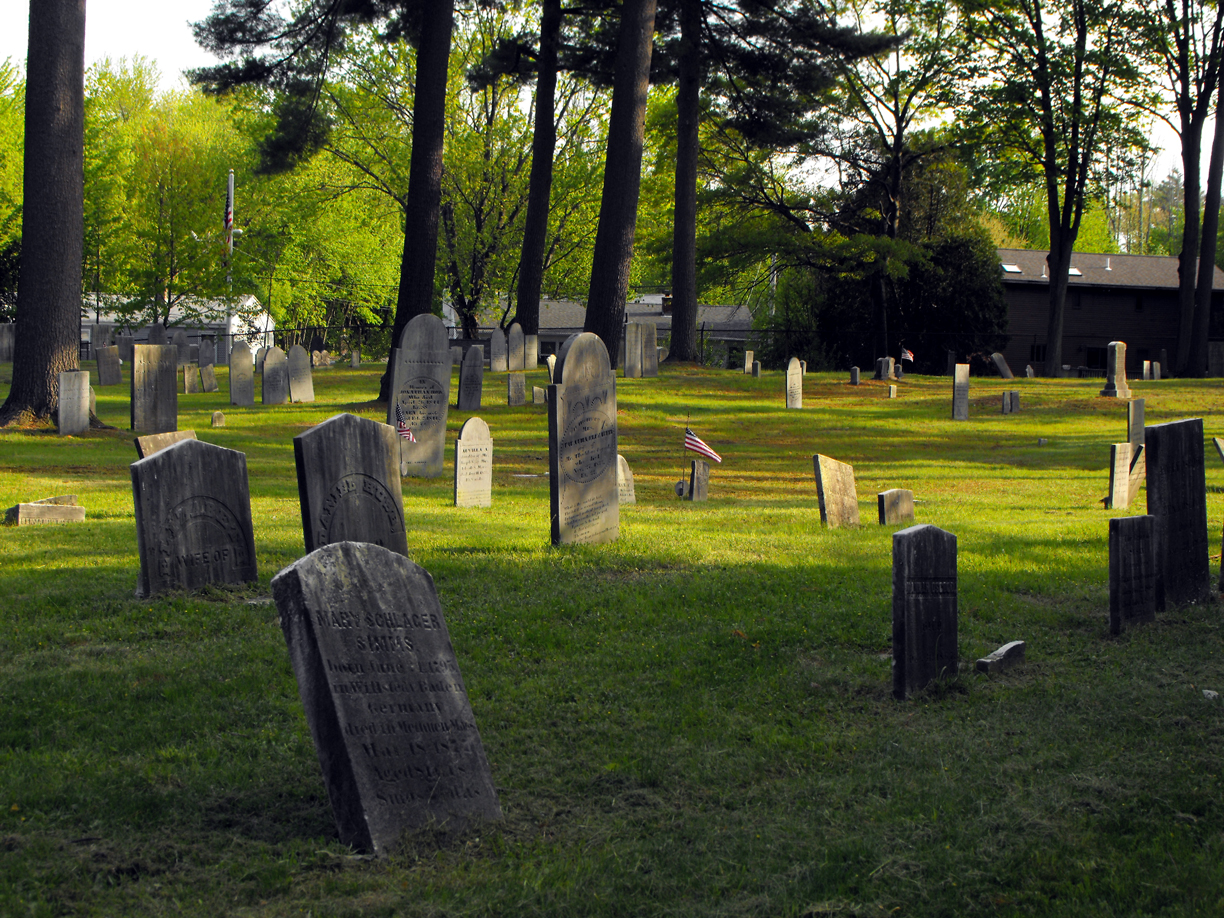
Lawrence Street Cemetery

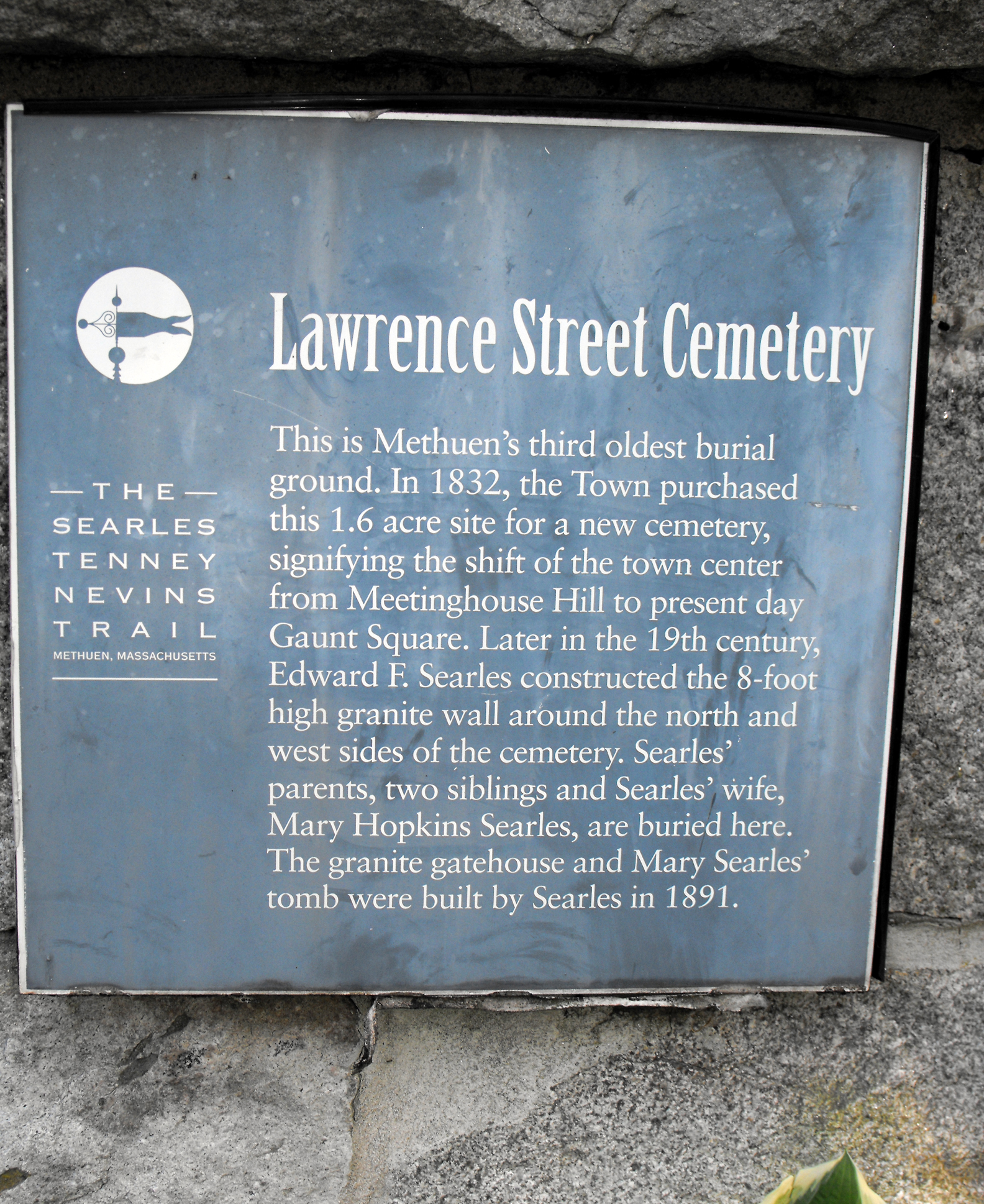
Sign Lawrence Street Cemetery

== See also ==
- National Register of Historic Places listings in Methuen, Massachusetts
