= Stephen Barker House =

Historic house in Massachusetts, United States

- U.S. National Register of Historic Places
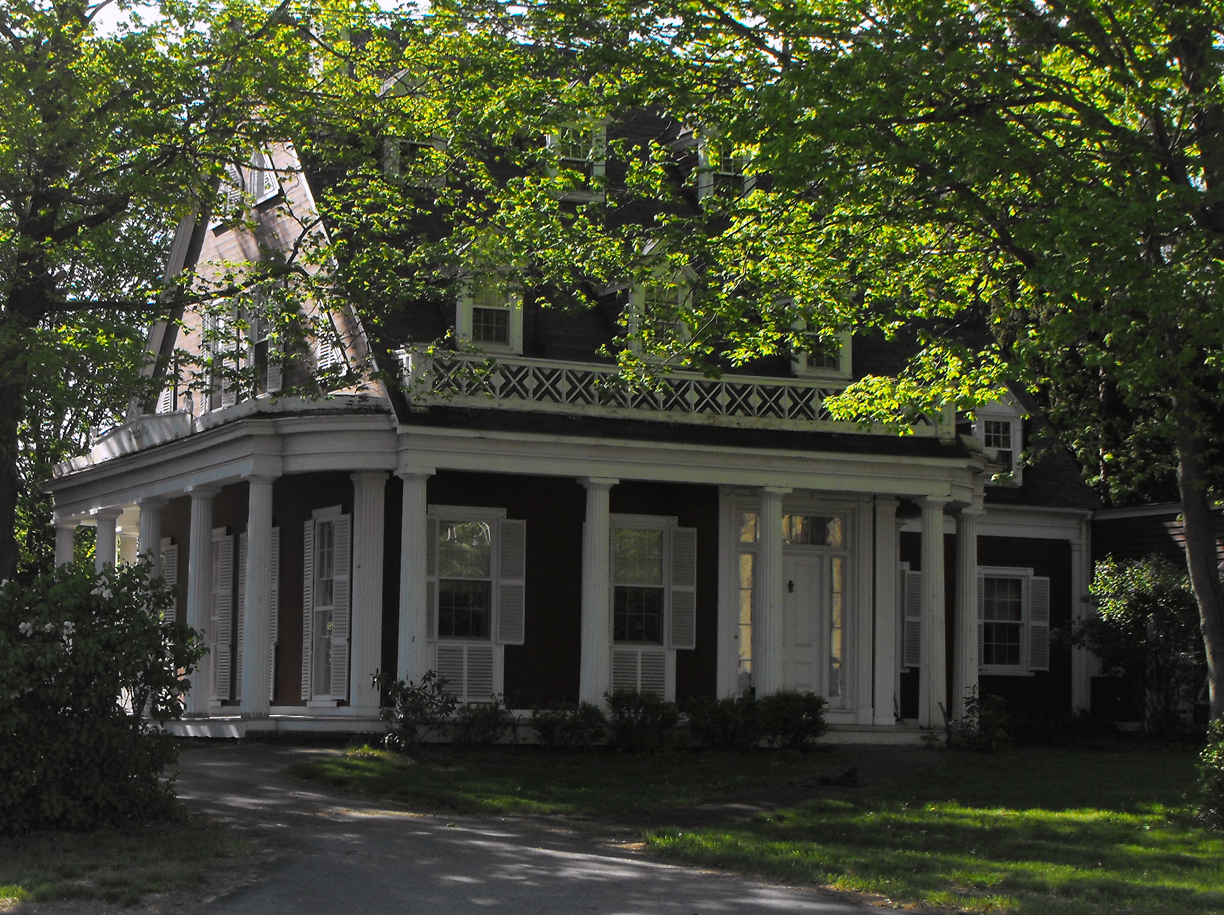
- Stephen Barker House c. 2008

- Location within Massachusetts Location within the United States
- Location: Methuen, Massachusetts
- Coordinates: 42°42′24″N 71°11′57″W
- Built: 1839
- Architectural style: Greek Revival
- MPS: Methuen MRA
- NRHP reference No.: 84002307
- Added to NRHP: January 20, 1984

Stephen Barker House is a historic house at 165 Haverhill Street in Methuen, Massachusetts.

Built in 1839, it is one of several handsome houses built at the periphery of the Methuen settlement in the mid-19th Century, and remains a well conserved "country Residence". Reportedly, surveyor Stephen Barker built "Woodland Cottage" in imitation of antebellum mansions he had seen in the South.

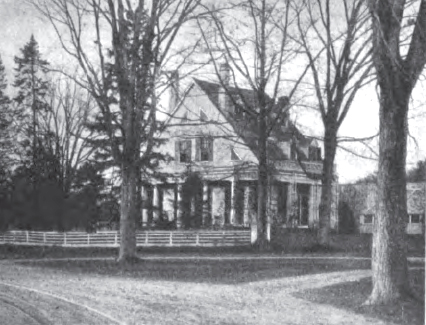
Stephen Barker Place c 1900.

Barker, from one of Methuen's original families, had gone to seek his fortune in Tennessee and sent home enough money to build a house. The old farm house was moved and on its site was built this imitation of a Southern mansion. The details of the house, such as the entrance, the Doric columns and frieze board above, classify it as Greek Revival. The builder freely adapted traditional elements: rows of dormers, triangular windows in the gable end, and railing above the porch mimicking gingerbread fretwork.

It was added to the National Historic Register in 1984.

== See also ==
- National Register of Historic Places listings in Methuen, Massachusetts
