= Park Lodge =

Historic house in Massachusetts, United States

- U.S. National Register of Historic Places
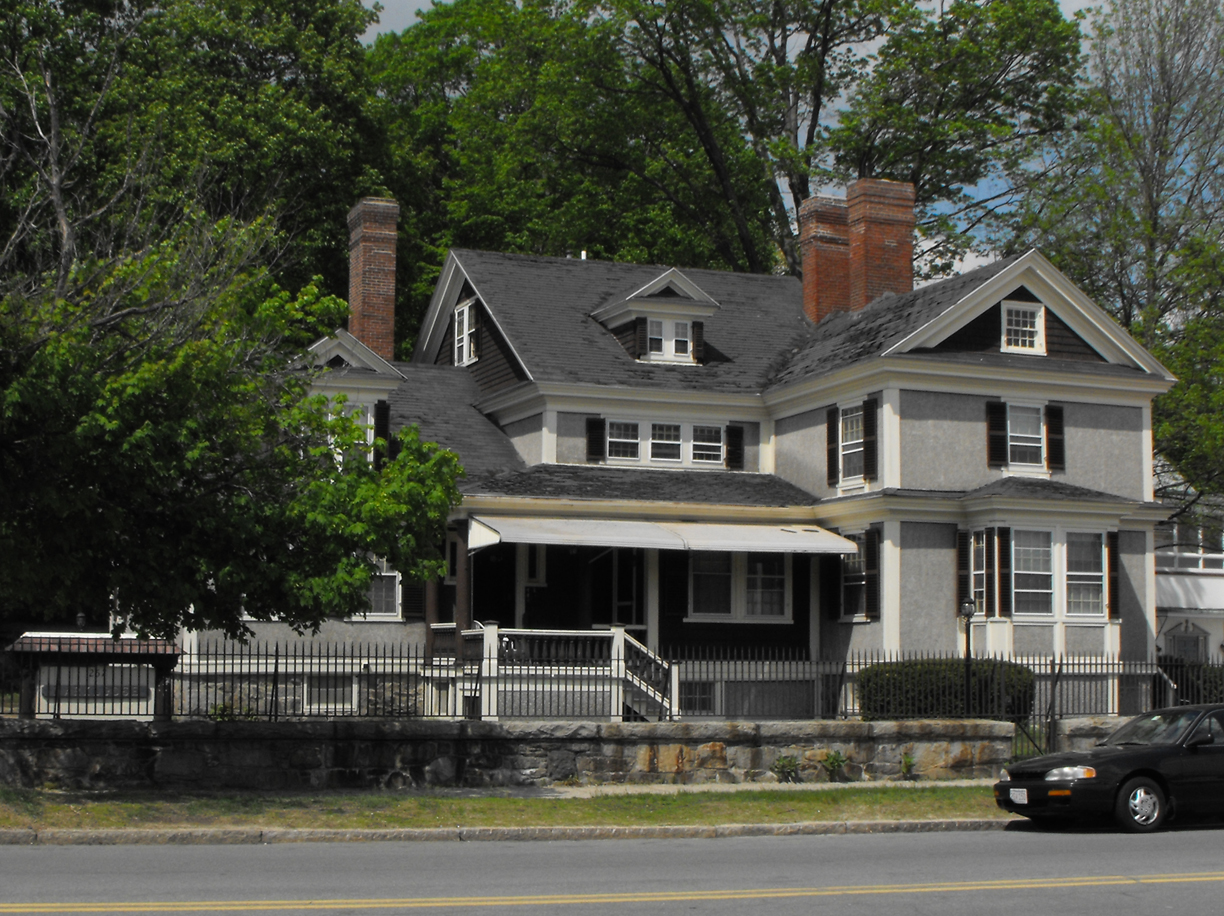

- Location within Massachusetts Location within the United States
- Location: 257 Lawrence Street, Methuen, Massachusetts
- Coordinates: 42°43′40″N 71°11′8″W
- Built: 1900
- Architectural style: Bungalow/Craftsman
- MPS: Methuen MRA
- NRHP reference No.: 84002414
- Added to NRHP: January 20, 1984

Park Lodge is a historic house in Methuen, Massachusetts. It is primarily noted for its association with industrialist and philanthropist Edward Searles whose Pine Lodge estate was nearby. Searles, a Methuen native who made a fortune in textiles and the railroad, made major contributions to the development of Methuen around the turn of the 20th century. This Craftsman style house, designed by Henry Vaughan and built in 1910, is a notable architectural element of Searles' legacy. The main block is a 2 1/2-story structure with a side-gable roof, which is extended to the left by a 1 1/2-story ell and to the front by a two-story projection. A shed-roof porch is in the crook to the left of this projection, and the main entrance is in the leftmost ell. The house is generally finished in stucco, with wooden shingles in the gable ends.

The house was listed on the National Register of Historic Places in 1984. At that time it was thought that this house incorporated elements of a c. 1840 Greek Revival farmhouse belonging to his father Jesse. However, the Jesse Searles House is now known to have been locate on the Searles estate, and was altered. It is possible that this house also incorporates an older building, because Searles was known to move buildings around. This house was sold out of the Searles family by his heirs after his death in 1920.

== See also ==
- National Register of Historic Places listings in Methuen, Massachusetts
- National Register of Historic Places listings in Essex County, Massachusetts
