= House at 13 Annis Street =

Historic house in Massachusetts, United States

- U.S. National Register of Historic Places
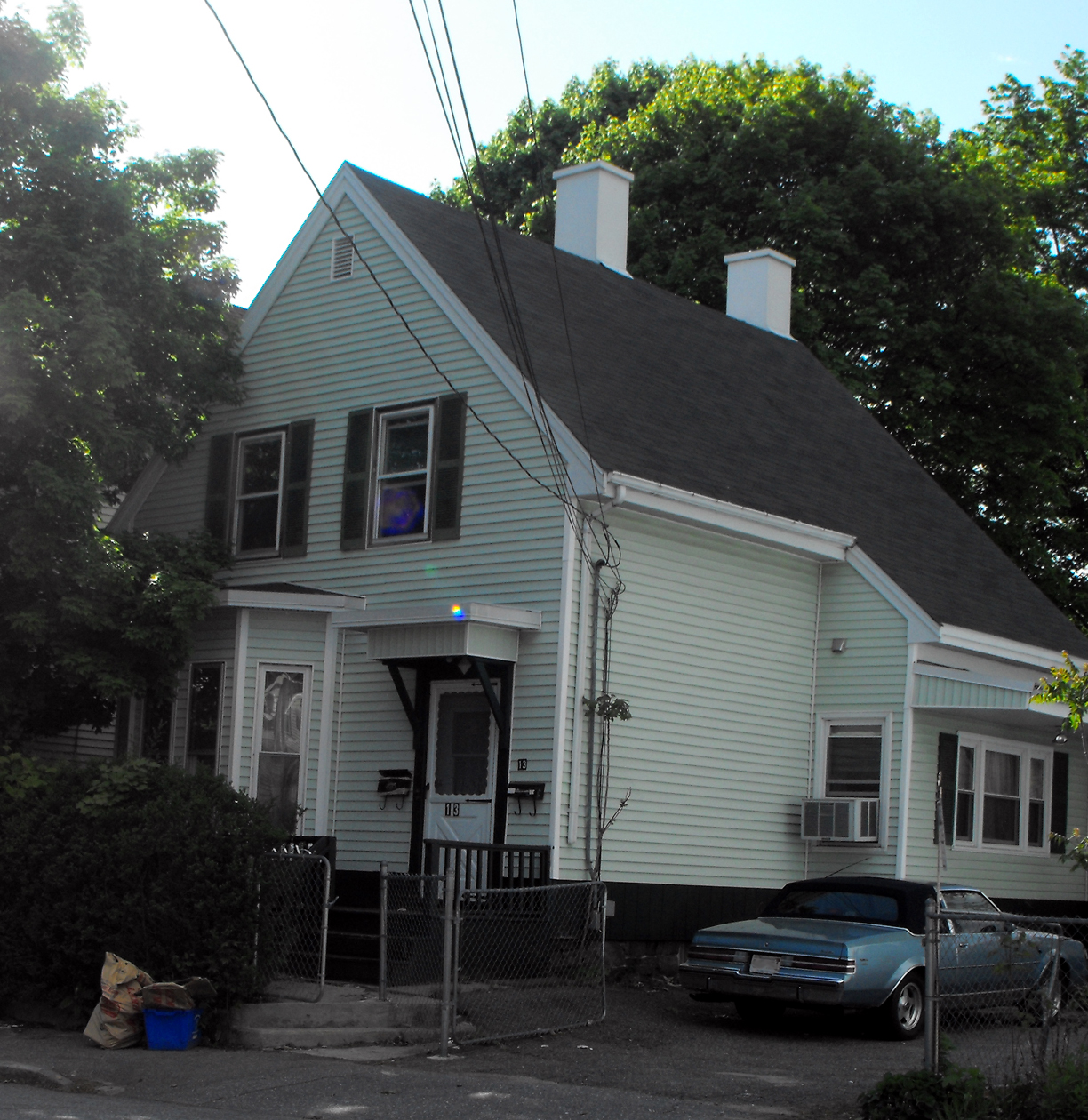

- Location within Massachusetts Location within the United States
- Location: 13 Annis Street, Methuen, Massachusetts
- Coordinates: 42°43′11″N 71°10′44″W
- Area: less than one acre
- Built: 1880
- Architectural style: Italianate
- MPS: Methuen MRA
- NRHP reference No.: 84002387
- Added to NRHP: January 20, 1984

13 Annis Street is a historic mill worker house in Methuen, Massachusetts. Built about 1880, it is a typical small residence built for workers at the nearby Arlington Mills. It was added to the National Register of Historic Places in 1984, but has lost many of its exterior decorative details since.

== Description and history ==
The house stands in a dense residential area of southern Methuen, on the north side of Annis Street between Tenney Street and Broadway (Massachusetts Route 28). It is a 1 1/2-story wood-frame structure, with a gabled roof, two brick chimneys, and exterior clad in synthetic siding. Its front facade is two bays wide, with the entrance on the right, under a hood supported by a simple knee bracket. The left bay has a projecting polygonal bay, and there are two windows in the attic level above. When surveyed in the 1980s, the house had a somewhat more elaborate exterior: the roof had extended eaves with Italianate brackets, and the attic windows had Italianate bracketed surrounds with diamond-shaped keystones. The main entry hood featured Italianate brackets, and similar window detailing was found on the windows of the bay.

Annis was one of the first streets to experience residential development due to the expansion of the Arlington Mills. It lies in what is now the Arlington Mills Historic District, the area immediately to the west along Stevens Pond of the Spicket River. The mills employed thousands of workers who lived in Lawrence and Methuen, but owned little worker housing. This building is representative of the inexpensive dwellings built by speculators for sale to woolen mill workers, which are commonly found in the immediate area.

== See also ==
- National Register of Historic Places listings in Methuen, Massachusetts
- National Register of Historic Places listings in Essex County, Massachusetts
