= Old Town Farm =

- U.S. National Register of Historic Places
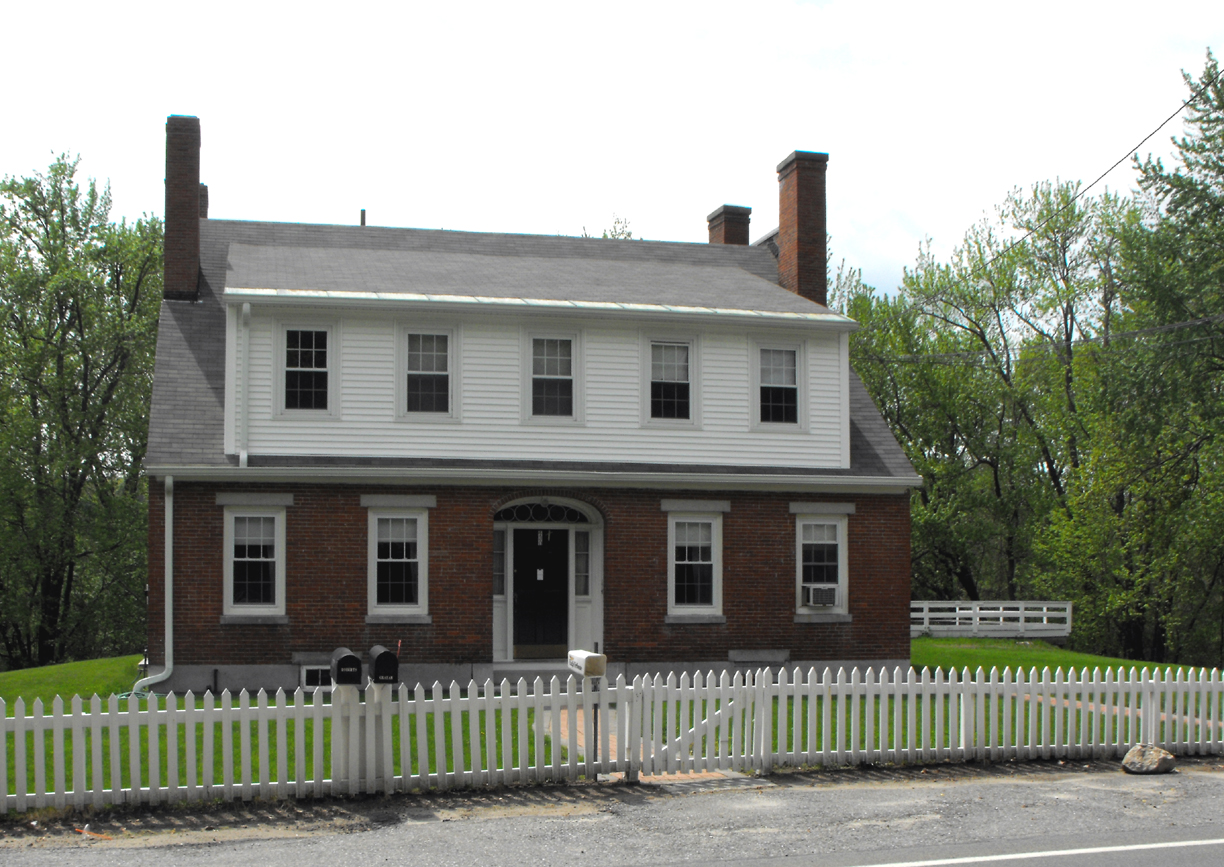

- Location within Massachusetts Location within the United States
- Location: 430 Pelham Street, Methuen, Massachusetts
- Coordinates: 42°44′17″N 71°14′33″W
- Built: 1845
- Architectural style: Greek Revival, Federal
- MPS: Methuen MRA
- NRHP reference No.: 84002413
- Added to NRHP: January 20, 1984

Old Town Farm is a historic poor farm building in Methuen, Massachusetts. The brick two story building was built in 1846, after Methuen lost its earlier poor farm due to the loss of part of its territory to newly founded Lawrence. The building is five bays wide and deep, with entries on the front and side; the front entrance is recessed with a fanlight and sidelights. The building has shed dormers that run much of the length of the roofline, and its end walls are topped by parapets and double chimneys, features not seen elsewhere in the town.

The house was listed on the National Register of Historic Places in 1984; it is now a private residence.

== See also ==
- National Register of Historic Places listings in Methuen, Massachusetts
- National Register of Historic Places listings in Essex County, Massachusetts
