= House at 306 Broadway =

Historic house in Massachusetts, United States

- U.S. National Register of Historic Places
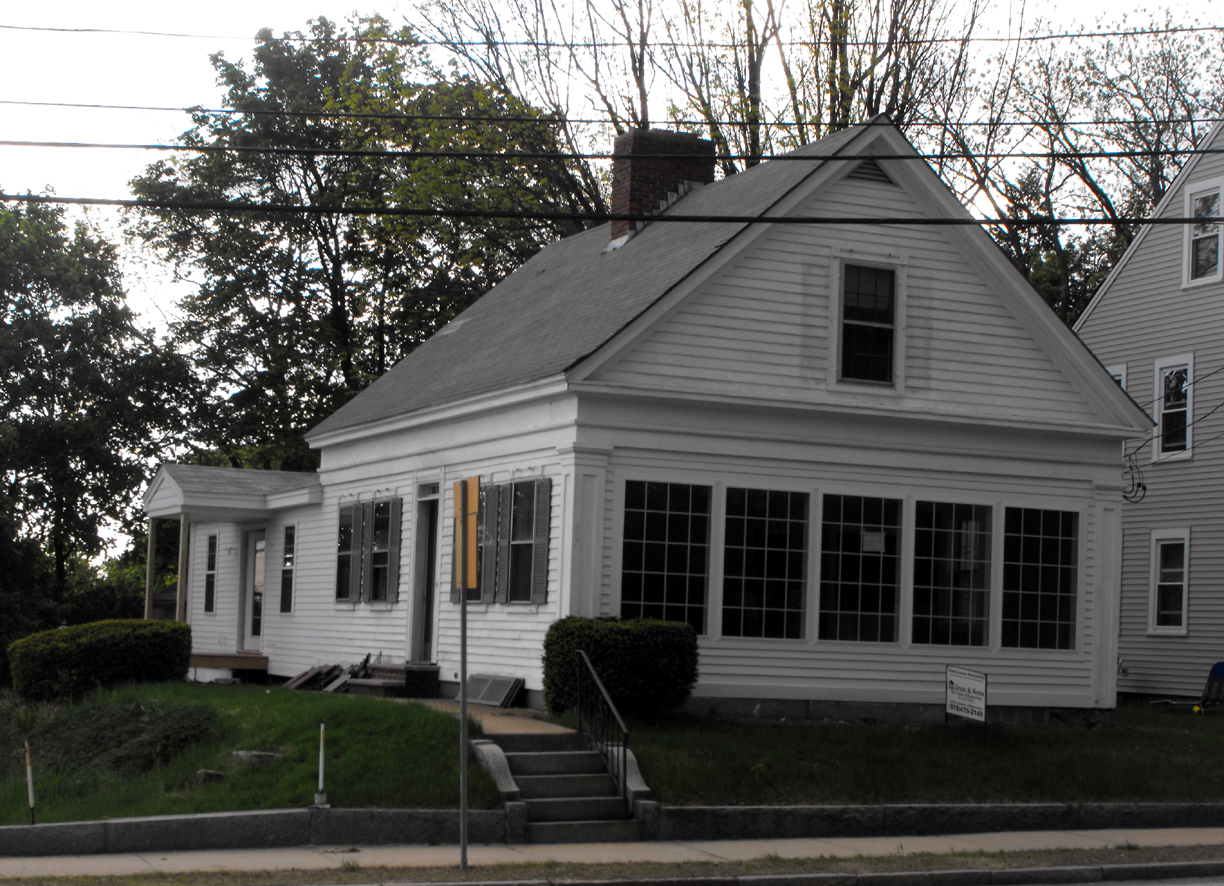
- House at 306 Broadway

- Location within Massachusetts Location within the United States
- Location: Methuen, Massachusetts
- Coordinates: 42°43′44″N 71°11′22″W
- Built: 1830
- Architectural style: Greek Revival
- MPS: Methuen MRA
- NRHP reference No.: 84002379
- Added to NRHP: January 20, 1984

The House at 306 Broadway in Methuen, Massachusetts, is a well-preserved example of a modest Greek Revival house built c. 1830. This style of house was relatively common in Methuen during the 1830s to the 1850s. The structure is a 1 1/2-story wood-frame building, with its gable end facing the street. The original design featured an entry centered on the longer side wall and three asymmetrically placed windows on the front. Over time, the front was altered to include a row of five windows, forming a virtual wall of glass.

Typical of the Greek Revival style, the house features pilastered corners and a deep cornice on the gable end. The main entrance, centered on the five-bay side wall, is highlighted by a transom window above the door.

The house was recognized for its historical significance and was listed on the National Register of Historic Places in 1984.

== See also ==
- National Register of Historic Places listings in Methuen, Massachusetts
- National Register of Historic Places listings in Essex County, Massachusetts
