= House at 10 Park Street =

Historic house in Massachusetts, United States

- U.S. National Register of Historic Places
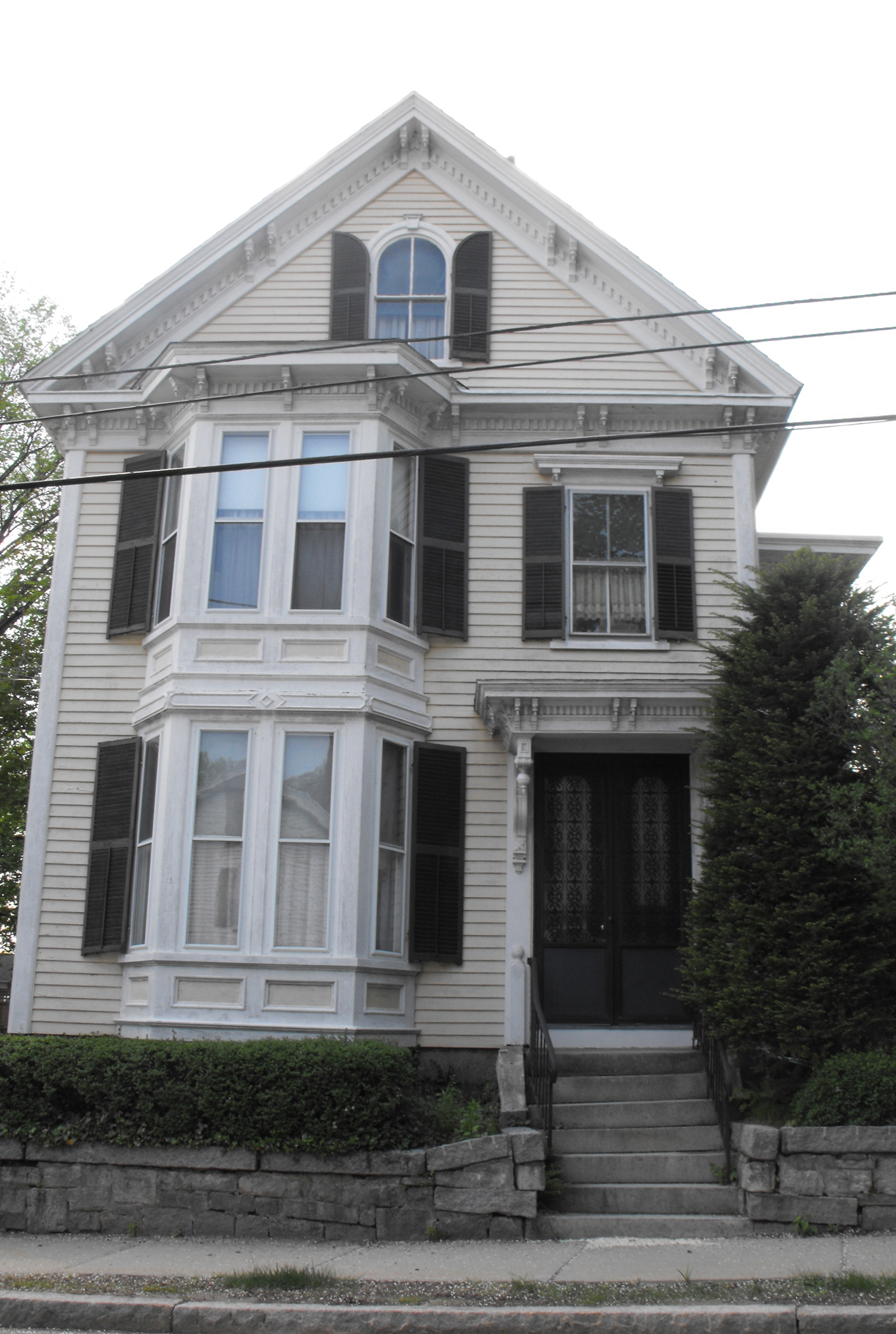

- Location within Massachusetts Location within the United States
- Location: 10 Park Street, Methuen, Massachusetts
- Coordinates: 42°43′34″N 71°11′9″W
- Built: c. 1880
- Architectural style: Italianate
- MPS: Methuen MRA
- NRHP reference No.: 84002385
- Added to NRHP: January 20, 1984

10 Park Street (also known as the E.M. Clark House) is a historic house located in Methuen, Massachusetts. The house was added to the National Register of Historic Places on January 20, 1984.

== Description and history ==
It is a 2 1/2-story wood-frame structure, with clapboard siding and a front-gable roof. The front facade is two bays wide, with a two-story projecting bay on the left, and the main entrance on the right, topped by a decorative hood. The gables and eaves are decorated by paired brackets.

The E. M. Clark House built around 1880 is a well-preserved Italianate style single family residences, most closely associated with the development of Methuen during the post-war expansion to service the local mills. E. M. Clark, an early resident, listed his occupation as a shoe manufacturer.

== See also ==
- National Register of Historic Places listings in Methuen, Massachusetts
- National Register of Historic Places listings in Essex County, Massachusetts
