= House at 262–264 Pelham Street =

Historic house in Massachusetts, United States

- U.S. National Register of Historic Places
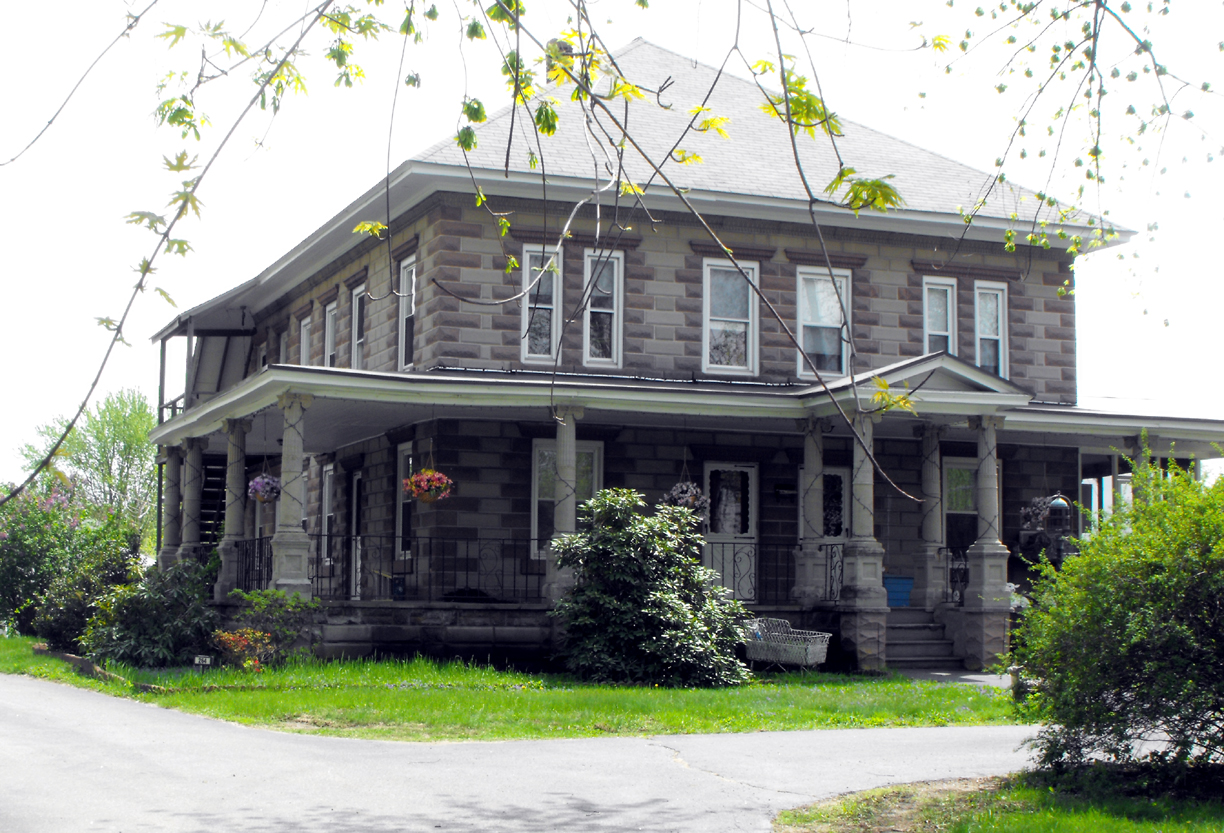

- Location within Massachusetts Location within the United States
- Location: 262–264 Pelham St., Methuen, Massachusetts
- Coordinates: 42°43′38″N 71°13′31″W
- Built: 1920
- Architectural style: Georgian
- MPS: Methuen MRA
- NRHP reference No.: 84002390
- Added to NRHP: January 20, 1984

The house at 262–264 Pelham Street in Methuen, Massachusetts is a rare Georgian Revival two-family house in a rural-suburban setting. The two-story house was built in 1920, and is a roughly square center entry plan with a wraparound porch supported by fourteen rusticated Ionic columns. It has a hipped roof, and is built of concrete and cast stone, building materials that are uncommon in Methuen. The windows and corners are highlighted by quoining with darker colored stones.

The house was listed on the National Register of Historic Places in 1984.

== See also ==
- National Register of Historic Places listings in Methuen, Massachusetts
- National Register of Historic Places listings in Essex County, Massachusetts
