= Turnpike House =

Historic house in Massachusetts, United States

- U.S. National Register of Historic Places

- Location within Massachusetts Location within the United States
- Location: 314 Broadway, Methuen, Massachusetts
- Coordinates: 42°43′47″N 71°11′24″W
- Built: 1805
- Architectural style: Federal
- MPS: Methuen MRA
- NRHP reference No.: 84002439
- Added to NRHP: January 20, 1984

The Turnpike House was a historic house in Methuen, Massachusetts. It was a 1 1/2-story wood-frame structure with a side-gable roof and a granite foundation, with two interior chimneys. The main entrance was flanked by full-length sidelight windows, and a two-story wing was added to its rear early in the 20th century. It was built, probably in 1806, after the construction of Essex Turnpike through Methuen, and was one of the city's oldest buildings. It was listed on the National Register of Historic Places in 1984, and demolished the same year.

== See also ==
- National Register of Historic Places listings in Methuen, Massachusetts
- National Register of Historic Places listings in Essex County, Massachusetts
