= G.B. Emmons House =

Historic house in Massachusetts, United States

- U.S. National Register of Historic Places
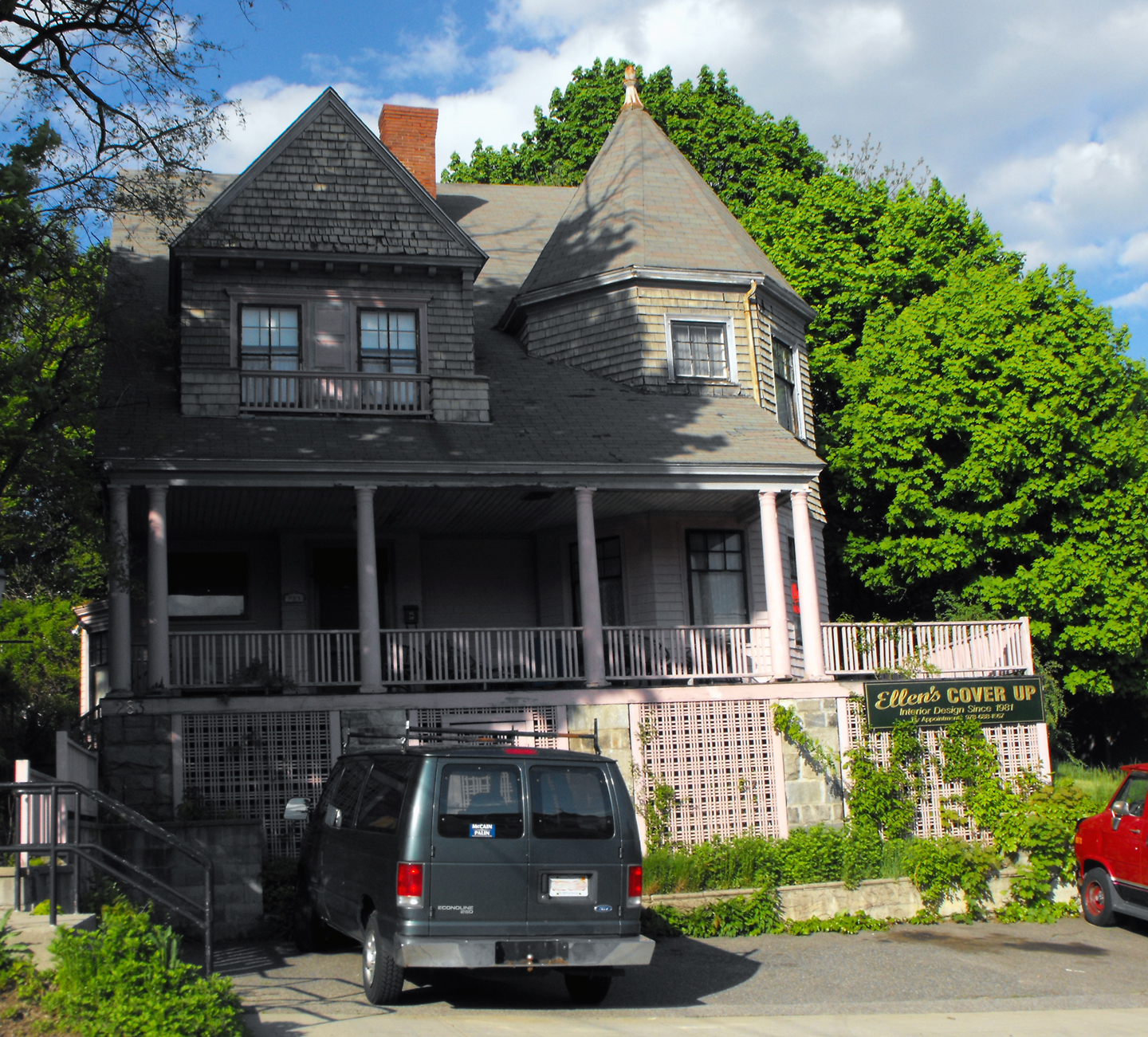

- Location within Massachusetts Location within the United States
- Location: Methuen, Massachusetts
- Coordinates: 42°43′44″N 71°11′18″W
- Built: 1890
- Architectural style: Queen Anne, Shingle Style
- MPS: Methuen MRA
- NRHP reference No.: 84002353
- Added to NRHP: January 20, 1984

The G.B. Emmons House is a historic house at 283 Broadway in Methuen, Massachusetts. The two story Queen Anne house was built c. 1890 for G.B. Emmons, president of the Emmons Loom Harness Company located in neighboring Lawrence. Despite being a fairly typical example of a fashionable residential house constructed in Methuen and Lawrence at the time, the house is prominently situated on a major road close to the town's center and has been well preserved.

The house was listed on the National Register of Historic Places in 1984.

== See also ==
- National Register of Historic Places listings in Methuen, Massachusetts
- National Register of Historic Places listings in Essex County, Massachusetts
