= Joseph Perkins House =

Historic house in Massachusetts, United States

- U.S. National Register of Historic Places
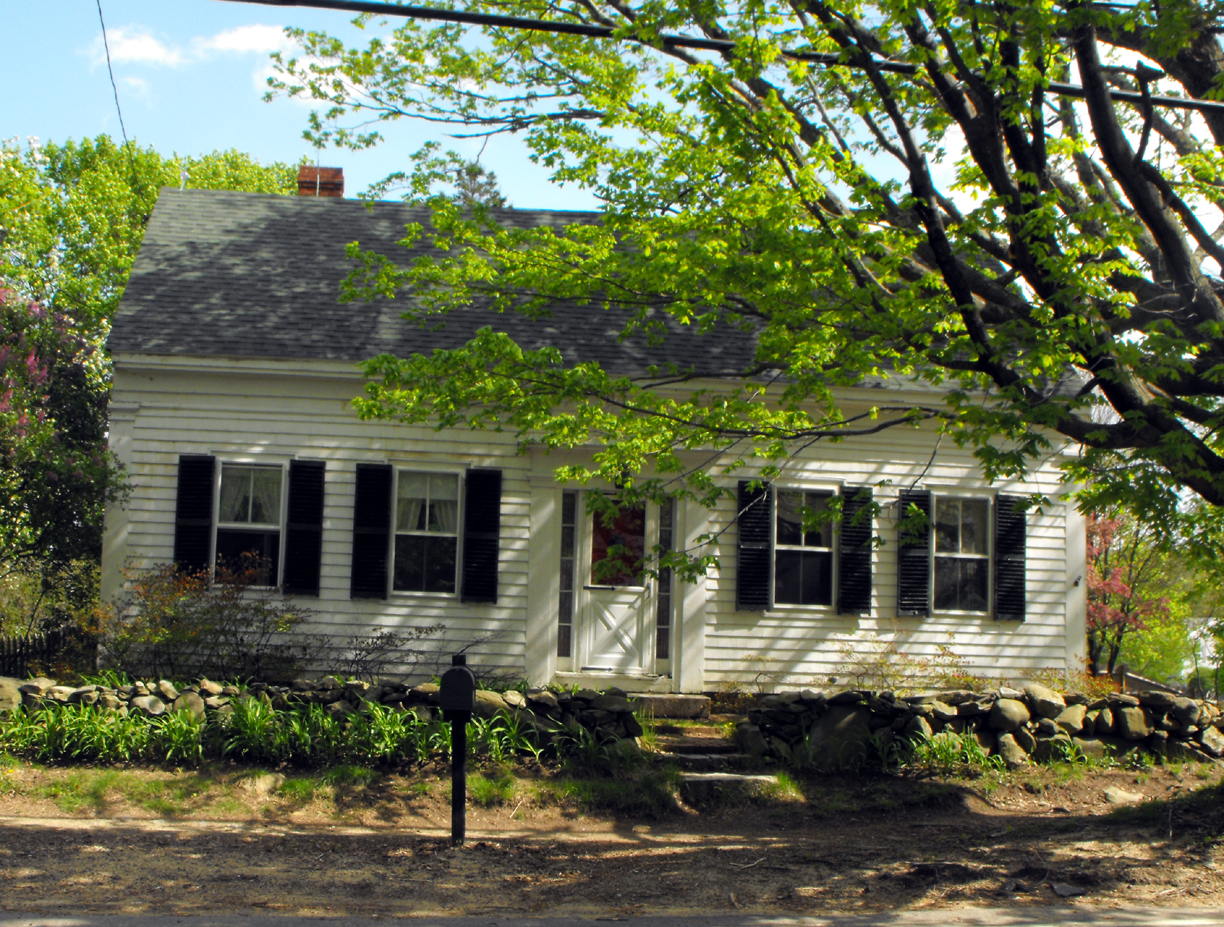

- Location within Massachusetts Location within the United States
- Location: 297 Howe Street, Methuen, Massachusetts
- Coordinates: 42°45′40″N 71°10′8″W
- Built: 1840
- Architectural style: Greek Revival
- MPS: Methuen MRA
- NRHP reference No.: 84002416
- Added to NRHP: January 20, 1984

The Joseph Perkins House is a historic house in Methuen, Massachusetts. From its external appearance, it is a Greek Revival 1.5-story wood-frame house, which appears to have been built around 1840; however, it has also been assigned construction dates as early as 1752 by local historians. It exhibits Greek Revival features, with corner pilasters, a deep cornice, and a center delighted doorway framed by an entablature supported by pilastered. It is named for a farmer who owned the property in the 19th century.

The property was listed on the National Register of Historic Places in 1984.

== See also ==
- National Register of Historic Places listings in Methuen, Massachusetts
- National Register of Historic Places listings in Essex County, Massachusetts
