= Nevins =

Nevins may refer to:

== Places in the United States ==
- Nevins Township, Vigo County, Indiana
- Nevins, Florida
- Nevins, Illinois
- Nevins, Wisconsin

== People with the surname ==
- Al Nevins (1915–1965), American musician and founder of The Three Suns
- Allan Nevins (1890–1971), American historian
- Andrea Blaugrund Nevins, American writer
- Arthur S. Nevins (1891–1979), American historian
- Caitlyn Nevins (born 1987), Australian netball player
- Claudette Nevins (1937–2020), American film actress
- Daniel S. Nevins (born 1966), Rabbi; Dean of the Rabbinical School at the Jewish Theological Seminary of America
- David Nevins (disambiguation), several people
- Gabe Nevins (born 1991), American actor
- Georgia Nevins (1864–1957), American nurse
- Harriet Nevins (1841–1929), American philanthropist
- Henry Nevins (disambiguation), several people
- Jasmine Nevins (born 2003), Australian cricketer
- Jason Nevins (born 1972), American dance music producer
- Jess Nevins (born 1966), American writer
- John Joseph Nevins (1932–2014), American Roman Catholic bishop
- Joseph Nevins, American author
- Kristan King Nevins, American politician
- Laurie Nevins (1920–1972), English footballer
- Monica Nevins (born 1973), Canadian mathematician
- Natalie Nevins (1925–2010), American singer
- Ralph G. Nevins (1924–1974), American professor
- Russell H. Nevins (1785–1854), American banker
- Sheila Nevins (born 1939), American television producer
- Sylvester Nevins (died 1901), Wisconsin State senator

== See also ==
- Nevin (disambiguation)
- Nevinson
