= Henry Coffin Nevins =

- Henry C. Nevins
- Born: January 10, 1843; Methuen, Massachusetts
- Died: June 25, 1892 (aged 49); New York County, New York, U.S.
- Resting place: Mount Auburn Cemetery
- Spouse: Julia Du Gay
- Parent(s): David Nevins Sr. and Elizabeth (Coffin) Nevins

Henry Coffin Nevins (January 10, 1843 – June 25, 1892) was an industrialist from an established New England family in the city of Methuen, Massachusetts.

== Life ==
Nevins was the son of David (born in Salem, New Hampshire on December 12, 1809 to John Nevins and Achsah, née Swan) and Eliza Nevins (née Elizabeth Coffin; daughter of a wealthy merchant from the island of Nantucket, Jared Coffin).

David Sr., who built his personal wealth through importing and manufacturing textiles, gained notoriety as the co-owner of Pemberton Mill, the collapse of which in 1860 "is likely the worst industrial accident in Massachusetts history" and "one of the worst industrial calamities in American history".

Henry and his elder brother, David, took on ever-increasing responsibilities as their father aged, including managing the City Exchange Banking Company, a Boston-based bank that was eventually merged with the Nevins' other businesses. The "Methuen Duck Cloth" the Nevinses manufactured was world-renowned as a material for sail cloth and tents for the tropics.

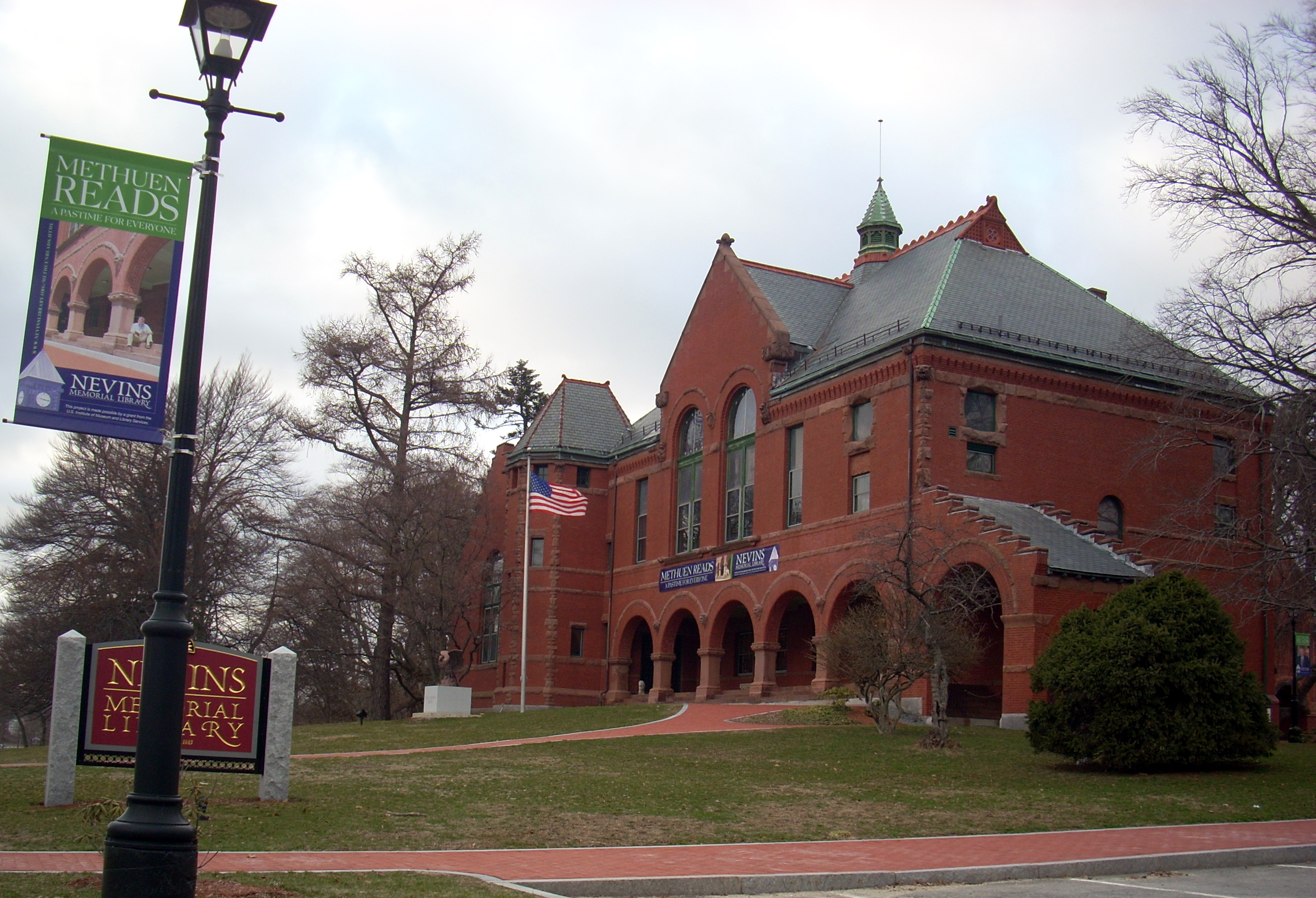
Nevins Memorial Library

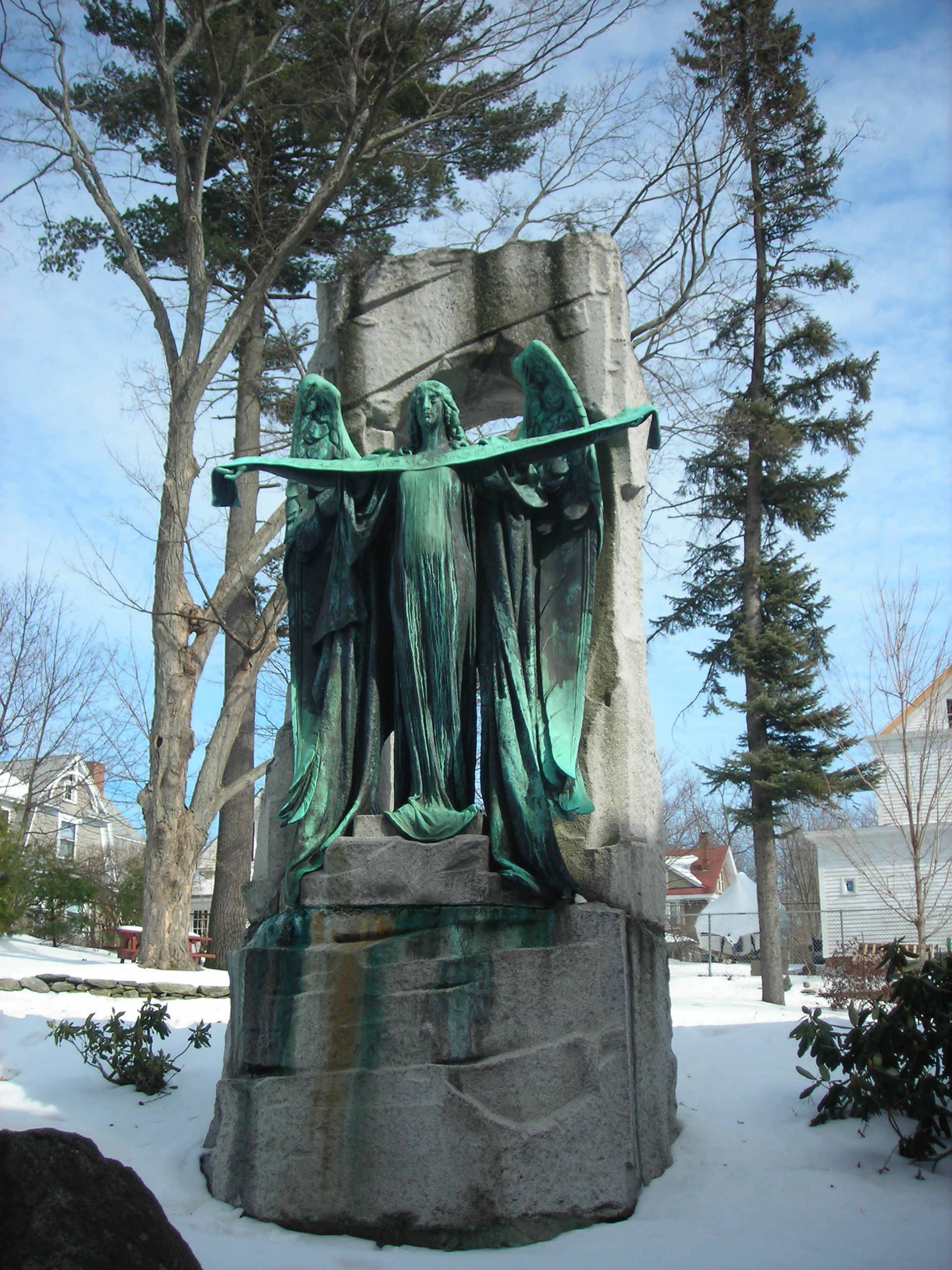
Angel of Life (1896)

After David Sr.'s death in 1881, the family's wealth was such that his widow Eliza, his eldest son David C, Nevins, and his younger son Henry Coffin Nevins were able to erect the Nevins Memorial Library in his honor. David Sr. and Eliza are buried on the library grounds beneath a memorial "Angel of Life" sculptured by George Moretti in 1896.

Henry and David, Jr., expanded the manufacturing and importing businesses they had inherited. They built textile mills and owned the India Bagging Company and Bengal Bagging Company in Salem, Massachusetts, continued importing goods from Asia, and helped give the city of Methuen "much of its unique identity."

== Legacy ==
Henry C. Nevins Home for Aged and Incurables

Henry Coffin Nevins married Julia Du Gay of Paris but they had no children. He was buried at Mount Auburn Cemetery beneath a limestone monument of cherubs and palm fronds designed by Augustus St. Gaudens. At the cost of over fifty thousand dollars, his wife dedicated to her husband, in the nave of the local Congregationalist Church, "The Resurrection", a stained glass window designed by John LaFarge and "said to be (one of) his masterpieces."

He was remembered posthumously in a recollection of:

"... a beautiful summer day in 1889 ... The marshal of the procession on that occasion was the late Henry C. Nevins, whose untimely death a few years later was deeply mourned by the entire community. He was superbly mounted, sat his horse finely, and was directly in front of the orator of the day, listening to every word with that attentive urbanity so characteristic of him."

With few close relatives, his widow became a philanthropist, like her sister-in-law Harriet Nevins. She left New England and lived an international life, establishing homes in Paris, at the Hotel Savoy in New York City, and Washington, D.C., where she died.

Upon her death, "Mrs. Julie F.H. Nevins" willed funds for the construction of the Henry C. Nevins Home for Aged and Incurables, an old age home established in 1906. Julia was living in New York City at the time of her death and The New York Times ran a story about her $1 million gift. The rest of her estate amounted to around $1.2 million and was inherited by her sister, Antoinette Lees (wife of Capt. George Cholmondeley of the Grenadier Guards) in London, to her "faithful maid" Margaret Young, Werner von Blomberg's wife Eva, and others. According to one author, "The public spirit and generosity of the Nevins family seems to have no bounds in the town in which they made their home".

Mrs. Henry C. Nevins was buried with her husband in Cambridge, Massachusetts. Her will included provisions for "roses, Easter lilies, sweet peas, and pansies" to be displayed on the couple's grave on appropriate holidays.

Henry Coffin Nevins' surname (as well as that of fellow "Methuen city fathers" Edward F. Searles and Charles H. Tenney) appears in the name of the "Searles Tenney Nevins Historic District" established by the City of Methuen in 1992 to preserve the "distinctive architecture and rich character of one of Massachusetts’ most unique neighborhoods". According to the City of Methuen:

Today, the trio's collective vision can be seen in mills, housing, schools, mansions, churches, monuments, playgrounds, the library, and the architectural fantasies that resulted from their artistic rivalry. The historic district boundaries were established to include properties and buildings constructed or used by the Searles, Tenney and Nevins families and the people who worked for them.

According to a description by the Essex National Heritage Area, the district:

"…reflects the major influences that shaped Methuen's architecture and economy. The Spicket River provided water power for the local industry housed in large brick mills along the river. Corresponding commercial growth resulted in Gaunt Square, which has been the commercial center of Methuen since the mid-19th century. In addition to economic forces, three individuals, David Nevins, Charles Tenney and Edward F. Searles, left an architectural legacy which defines the district's character today."
