= Harriet Nevins =

American philanthropist and animal welfare advocate

- Born: Harriet Francoeur Blackburn; 1841; Roxbury, Boston, Massachusetts, U.S.
- Died: November 14, 1929 (aged 87–88); Methuen, Massachusetts, U.S.
- Other names: Harriette Nevins
- Occupation: Philanthropist
- Spouse: David Nevins, Jr.
- Children: 2

Harriet Francoeur Nevins (Note: Her name also appears in print as Harriette.) (née Blackburn; 1841 – November 14, 1929) was an American philanthropist and animal welfare advocate born in Roxbury, Massachusetts. Widow of David Nevins Jr., she used her inheritance to leave a legacy to the people of the Bay State. She died November 14, 1929, at her home in Methuen, Massachusetts.

== Nevins Family ==
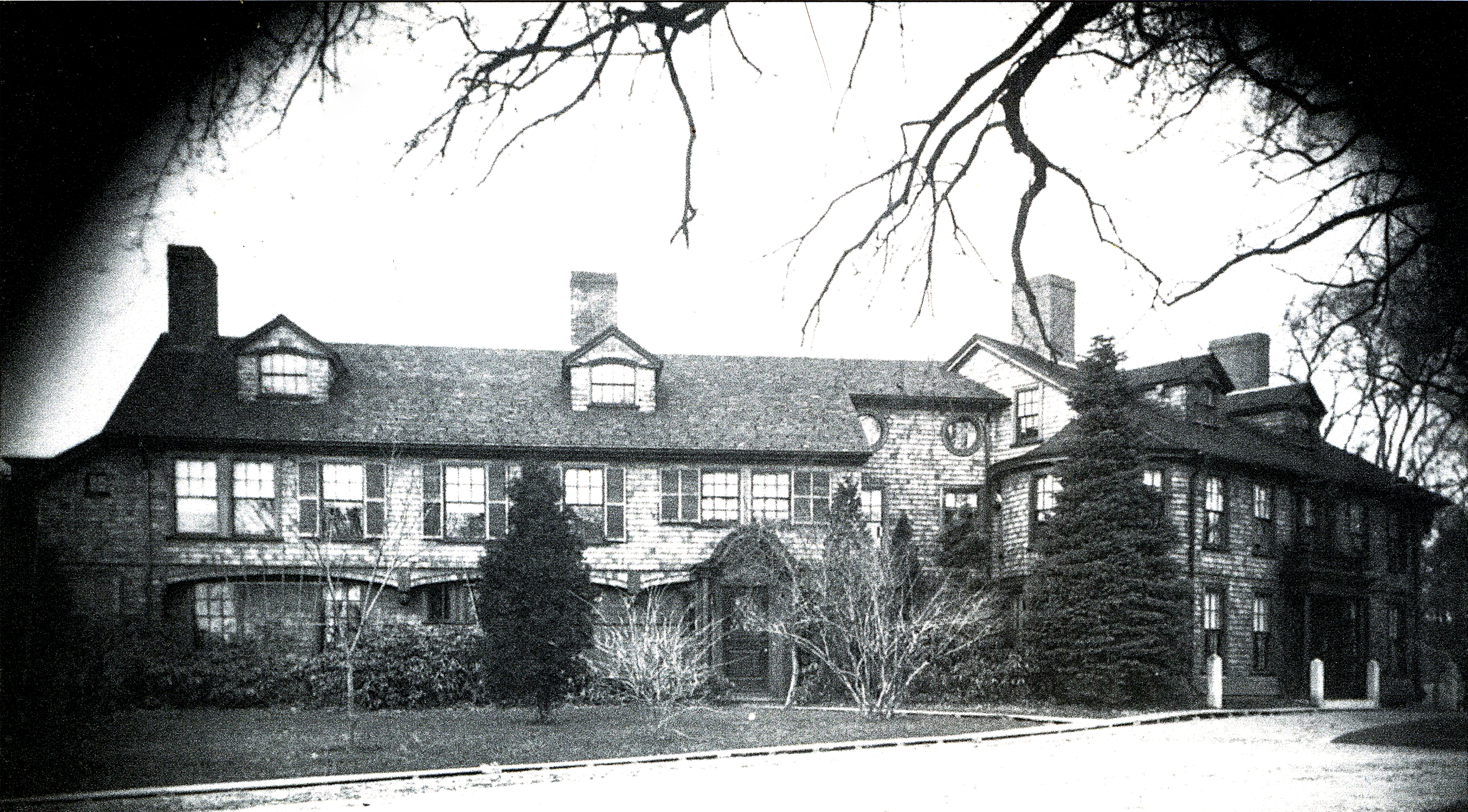
Nevins Family Estate at the corner of Hampshire Street and Broadway in Methuen. The estate was razed in the 1950s to make room for a municipal building

Harriet Nevins' father, George Blackburn, was born in Bradford, England, there he learned the trade of mill machining. At nineteen he was part of a group of men sent to the United States to work in the developing industry. He worked at the mills in Webster, Massachusetts, and in the Fitchburg Duck Mills. He married Nancy Hill Bugbee of Wrentham and they had three children: George, William Henry, and Harriet. By 1861, Blackburn had partnered with David Nevins, Sr. to rebuild the recently destroyed Pemberton Mill in Lawrence, Massachusetts.

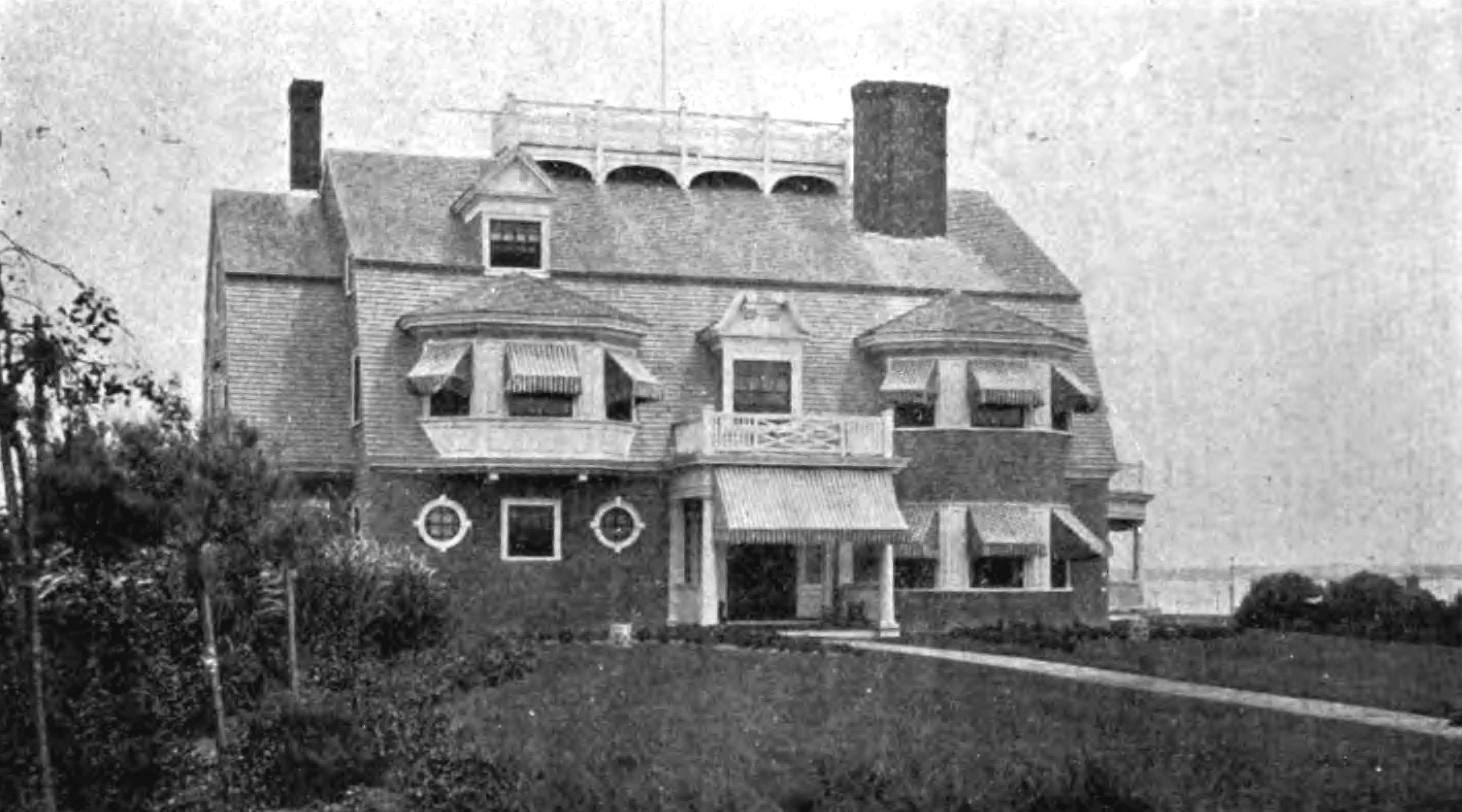
Nantucket summer home of Mr and Mrs David C. Nevins, built by the couple in 1894.

In April 1862, 18-year-old Harriet married 22-year-old David Nevins Jr. David Jr. and his brother increased the Nevins family fortune in the industrial boom of the late 19th century, and the couple moved to South Framingham.

Unfortunately none of their children survived to adulthood, but the couple did act as a guardian to a boy named Hiram Appleman, who later became a minister and adopted a young girl; Elise Nevins would later marry William Finley Morgan of Boston and go on to author books of a religious nature.

In 1894, David Nevins Jr. built an elegant colonial revival shingle–style home on Nantucket for their summer retreat.

David Nevins Sr. died in 1881. In 1890, Harriet and David Jr. moved to Boston to live with his mother, Eliza. For five years, the couple took care of Eliza in her Beacon Street home, but in 1895 the 78-year-old matron died. Three years later, in 1898, David Jr. died while on a trip to Europe, leaving a 57-year-old Harriet a wealthy widow. Shortly afterward Harriet moved to the family farm in Methuen, which sister-in-law, Julia Du Gay, had left after her husband Henry Nevin's death in 1892.

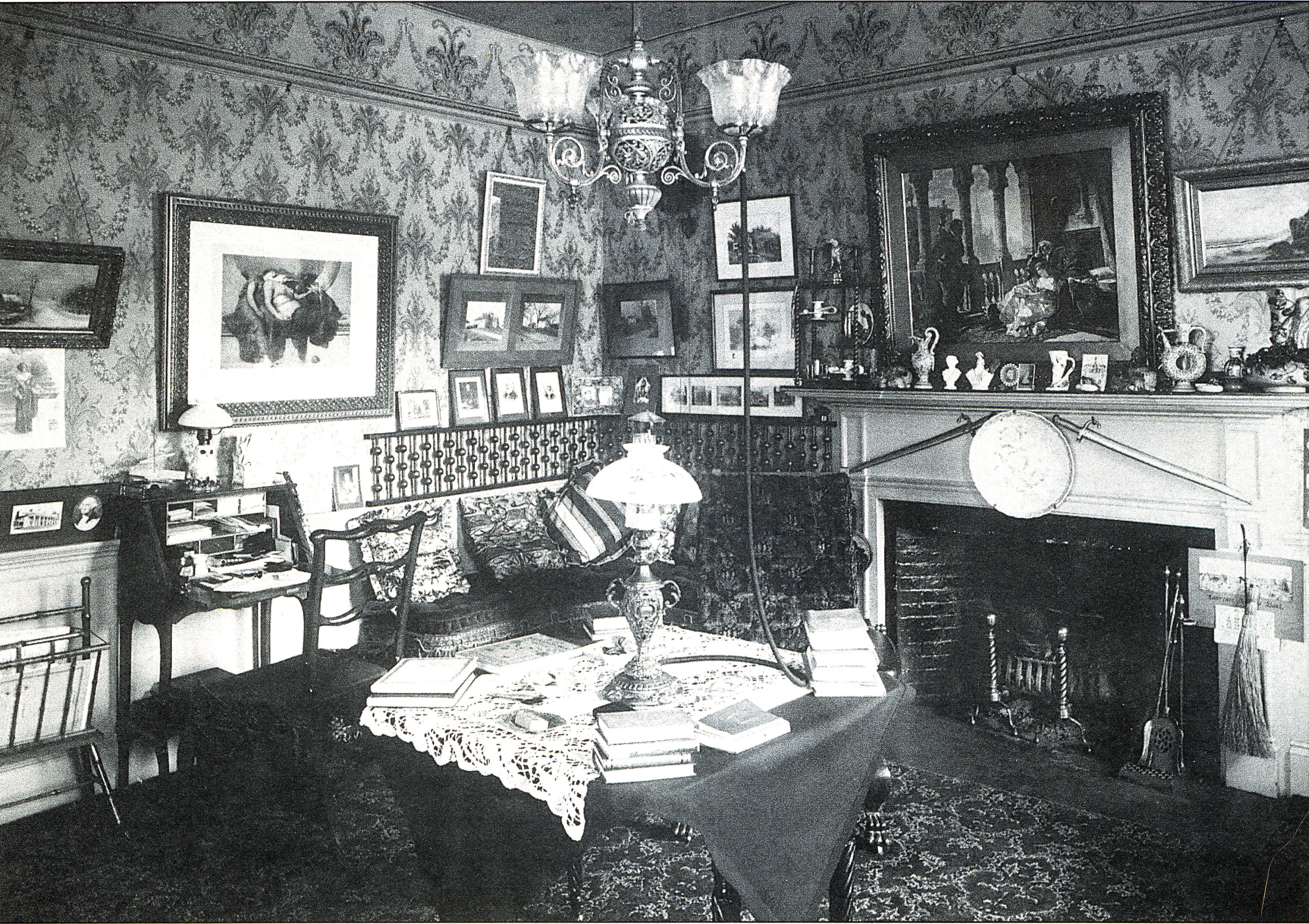
Interior of Nevins Family Estate where Harriet lived until her death.

Mrs. Nevins spent the next thirty years socially active and involved with many organizations, donating to worthy causes such as the Massachusetts Society for the Prevention of Cruelty to Animals, the Boston Children's Mission and the International Association of Rebekah Assemblies (female branch of the Independent Order of Odd Fellows).

On November 14, 1929, at 88 Harriet died quietly at her home in Methuen, Massachusetts, after a lengthy illness, the last twelve months almost entirely at her estate. It is said her death was hastened by that of her beloved chauffeur John G Kilmurray who was struck by a drunk driver on Christmas eve of 1928 while delivering Mrs. Nevins' Yuletide remembrances.

In her will, Mrs. Nevins left money to all her favorite organizations, including the Animal League of Boston, the Red Acre Farm of Stow, and the Ladies Union Charitable Society which operated the Lawrence General Hospital. She also left $2,500 to both towns of Methuen and Walpole to fund the construction of fountains for horses and dogs; the bowl of the Methuen fountain remains in the Methuen Square and is used as a planter and the Walpole fountain is now dry but still stands on School Street opposite the old Stone School (now Walpole Town Hall).

== Massachusetts Society for the Protection of Animals ==
=== Horse Ambulance ===
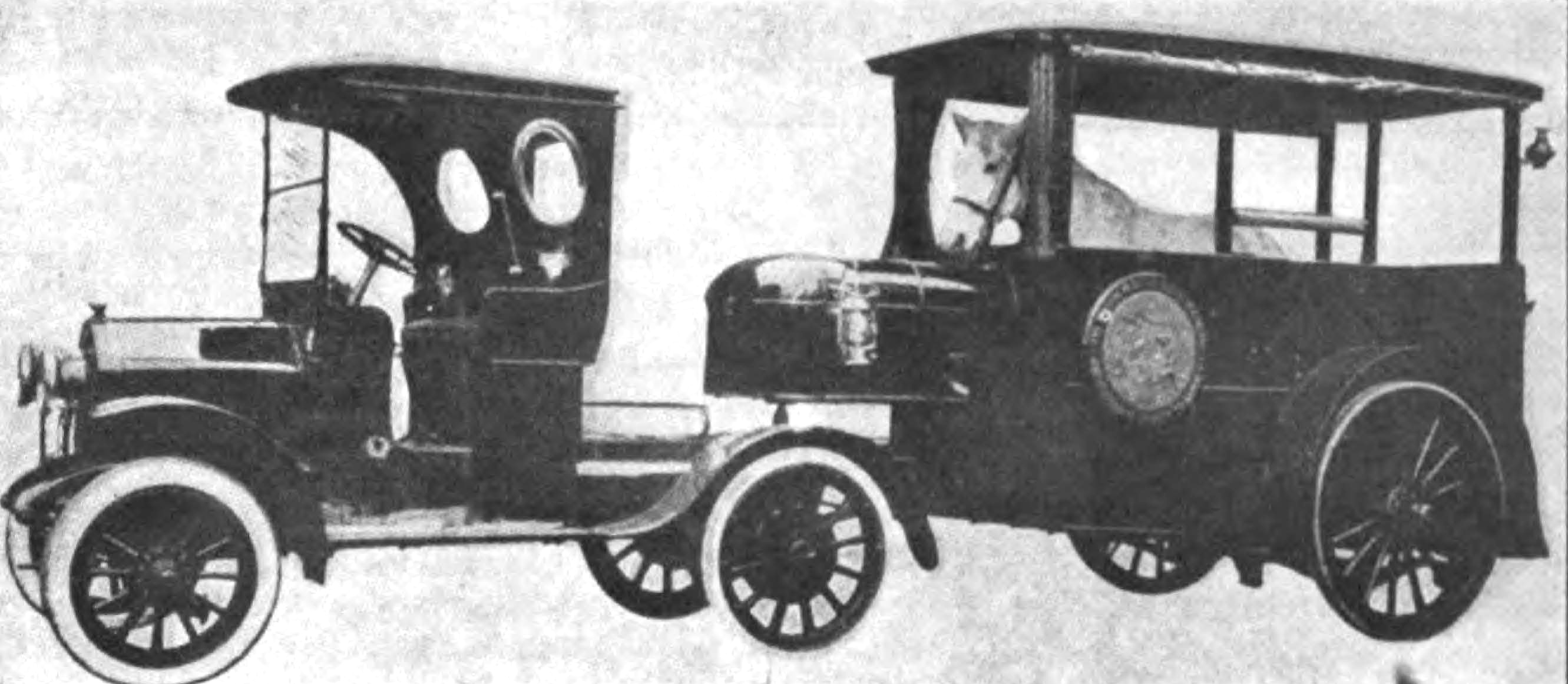
Custom design Horse Ambulance donated by Mrs David Nevins to the MSPCA in 1916

Long active with the Massachusetts Society for the Prevention of Cruelty to Animals, in 1916 Mrs. Nevins commissioned and donated a specially designed motorized horse ambulance. Built at the Garford Truck factory and designed by the Monahan Vehicle Company, Providence, R. I., Mrs Nevins commissioned it when after "witnessing the removal of an injured horse in one of the society's horse-drawn ambulances [she] decided that a more effective method of transferring injured equines might be perfected." Constructed on a Garford one-ton-truck chassis, it had a four-cylinder engine, pneumatic front tires and solid rear tires, as well as headlamps and adjustable lamps of the type found on fire engines. The cab was fitted with a glass windshield and side curtains completely enclosing the driver. The ambulance was a trailer with floor inclined towards the rear, allowing the entrance to be near to the ground, with the loading gate forming a ramp. The body was equipped with top and side curtains to give protection from bad weather. The cost is estimated to have been about $5,000.

=== Nevins Farm ===
Nevins Farm before Harriet Nevins donated it to the MSPCA

In 1917, Harriet Nevins donated the rolling pastures of her farm to the Massachusetts Society for the Prevention of Cruelty to Animals so that it could be used as a rest home for horses and other unwanted or abandoned animals. The donation was accompanied by a $5,000 bequest toward building construction and the purchase of necessary farm implements and machinery.

First known as "The Rest Home", the property was used for retired police horses and for other horses who worked on the then-cobblestone streets of Boston. Arrangements made with horse owners allowed horses that were still working animals to spend time grazing and relaxing in the pastures. A common agreement was one in which horses would rotate between spending a month on the farm and a month in Boston working.

Now known as Nevins Farm and Equine Center, the farm is still operated by the MSPCA-Angell and is the only open-door horse and farm animal rescue center in New England. Part of the 55-acre (220,000 m^{2}) property is devoted to the Hillside Acre Animal Cemetery, a 4-acre (16,000 m^{2}) pet cemetery of landscaped hillside surround by a tall iron fence.

== Nevins Memorial Library ==
The Nevins Memorial Library was built in 1883 as gift from the Nevins family to the City of Methuen to honor David Nevins, Sr., Harriet Nevins' father-in-law. For many years Mrs. Nevins was the chairman of the Library's Board of Trustees, repeatedly giving gifts of funds to expand the collection.

From 1908's Genealogical and Personal Memoirs Relating to the Families of Boston and Eastern Massachusetts:

Mrs. David Nevins, Jr., now the only surviving member of the family, has been especially generous in gifts of books, paintings, statuary and various specimens of the fine arts. Although the endowment of the library is sufficient for its maintenance without the aid of public funds, Mrs. Nevins has increased its value and usefulness by her contributions. The public spirit and generosity of the Nevins family seems to have no bounds in the town in which they made their home.

In 1917 Mrs. Nevins purchased the house next to the library at 299 Broadway which had been assessed at $500; she transferred the house and land to the Nevins Memorial Library the following year. The house became for many years the home of the Methuen Historical Commission. The original building was razed in 1999 and the historical collection moved to the basement of the Masonic Lodge for storage until a more permanent facility can be located.

The Nevins Memorial Library was listed on the National Register of Historic Places in 1984. The library is the custodian of the Nevins Memorial Library Historic Collection, much of which is in storage and for which viewing appointments should be made. The collection includes manuscripts and printed materials, family history resources, vital records, assorted objets d'art and collectables, life-sized portraits of Nevins family members, and the stained-glass windows of the library itself.

== Blackburn Hall ==
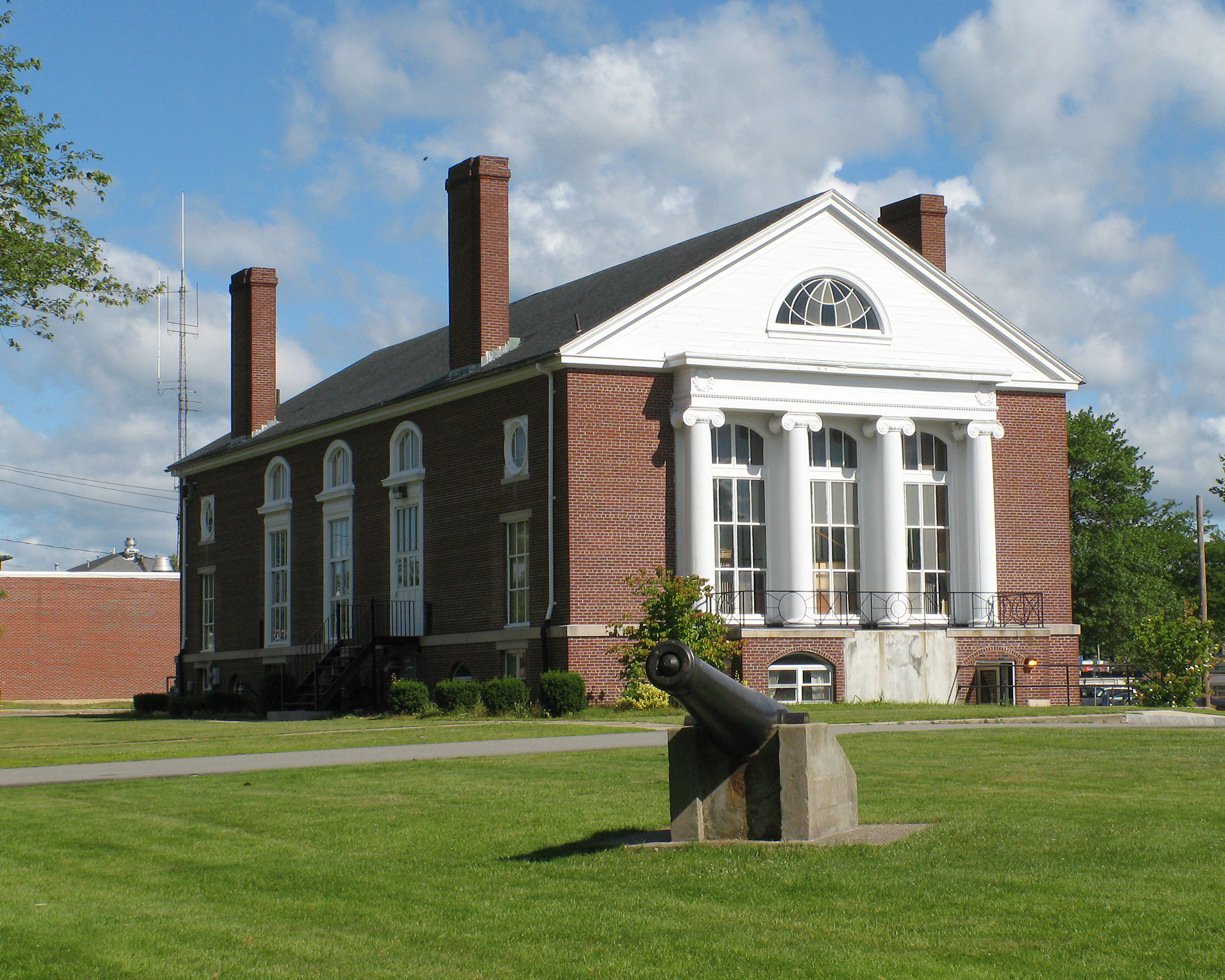
Blackburn Hall in Walpole, Massachusetts, was built by Harriet Nevins as a memorial to her parents.

In her 1929 will, Mrs. Nevins donated $50,000 for the erection of a public building in Walpole, Massachusetts, as a memorial to her parents, as her father had once lived and done business in Walpole. Blackburn Memorial Building (more commonly known as "Blackburn Hall") was designed by the architectural firm of Putnam & Cox Company of Boston, built by the F.J. Tetreault Company of Walpole, and dedicated in 1932. The red brick building, which features a neo-classical façade with whitewashed columns, is still owned by the Town of Walpole and is used for a variety of activities throughout the year including children's theater productions.
