= David Nevins Jr. =

American businessman (1839–1898)

- David C Nevins
- Born: July 30, 1839; Boston, Massachusetts
- Died: August 24, 1898 (aged 59); Germany
- Resting place: Methuen, Massachusetts
- Occupation: Industrialist
- Spouse: Harriet F. Nevins
- Parent(s): David Nevins Sr. and Elizabeth Coffin Nevins

David Nevins Jr. (July 30, 1839 in Boston, Massachusetts – August 24, 1898 in Germany) was a wealthy Yankee merchant in the city of Methuen, Massachusetts during the industrial boom of the late 19th century.

== Life ==
Nevins was the son of David Nevins Sr. who was born in Salem, New Hampshire on December 12, 1809 to John Nevins and Achsah Nevins née Swan Nevins. David Jr.'s mother was Eliza Nevins née Eliza Coffin, the daughter of a wealthy merchant from the island of Nantucket named Jared Coffin. David Sr., who built his personal wealth through importing and manufacturing textiles, gained notoriety as the co-owner of Pemberton Mill, the collapse of which in 1860 "is likely the worst industrial accident in Massachusetts history" and "one of the worst industrial calamities in American history".

David Jr. was educated in Boston and in Paris. Upon completing his education, he joined his father's business and took on ever-increasing responsibilities as his father aged. For a time he managed the City Exchange Banking Company, a financial institution with offices in Boston that was eventually merged with the Nevins' other businesses. The "Methuen Duck Cloth" the Nevins manufactured was world-renowned as a material for sail cloth and tents for the tropics.

After David Sr.'s death in 1881, the family's wealth was such that his widow Eliza, his eldest son David Nevins, and his younger son Henry Coffin Nevins were able to erect the Nevins Memorial Library in his honor. David Sr. and Eliza are buried on the library grounds beneath a memorial "Angel of Life" sculptured by George Moretti.

Nevins, partnered with younger brother Henry, expanded the manufacturing and importing businesses they had inherited. He built textile mills and owned India Bagging Company and Bengal Bagging Company in Salem, Massachusetts, continued importing goods from Asia, and helped give the city of Methuen "much of its unique identity."

== Legacy ==
David and his wife Harriet F. Nevins (née Harriet F. Blackburn) had no children, but after his death she used his fortune to leave a legacy for the public that includes Nevins Farm and Equine Center in Methuen as well as Blackburn Hall and a stone fountain in Walpole, Massachusetts. As a memorial dedicated to her husband in the nave of the local Congregationalist Church she dedicated "The Resurrection", a stained glass window designed by John LaFarge and "said to be his masterpiece."

David Nevins' surname (as well as that of fellow "Methuen city fathers" Edward F. Searles and Charles H. Tenney) appears in the name of the "Searles Tenney Nevins Historic District" established by the City of Methuen in 1992 to preserve the "distinctive architecture and rich character of one of Massachusetts' most unique neighborhoods". According to the City of Methuen:

Today, the trio’s collective vision can be seen in mills, housing, schools, mansions, churches, monuments, playgrounds, the library, and the architectural fantasies that resulted from their artistic rivalry. The historic district boundaries were established to include properties and buildings constructed or used by the Searles, Tenney and Nevins families and the people who worked for them.

According to a description by the Essex National Heritage Area, the district:

reflects the major influences that shaped Methuen's architecture and economy. The Spicket River provided water power for the local industry housed in large brick mills along the river. Corresponding commercial growth resulted in Gaunt Square, which has been the commercial center of Methuen since the mid-19th century. In addition to economic forces, three individuals, David Nevins, Charles H. Tenney and Edward F. Searles, left an architectural legacy which defines the district's character today.

A short distance from above-mentioned Nevins Memorial Library is the Henry C. Nevins Home for Aged and Incurables, an old age home established in 1906 and named for his brother. According to one author, "The public spirit and generosity of the Nevins family seems to have no bounds in the town in which they made their home".
