= Henry Nevins =

Henry Nevins may refer to:

- Henry B. Nevins (1878–1950), yacht builder
- Henry Coffin Nevins (1843–1892), industrialist

== See also ==
- Henry B. Nevins, Incorporated, a yacht builder in City Island, New York
- Henry C. Nevins Home for Aged and Incurables
