= George Howe (merchant) =

George Howe (1819–1899) of Boston was a 19th-century merchant, industrialist, and investor. He was, with David Nevins Sr., co-owner of Pemberton Mill when it collapsed in what is "likely the worst industrial accident in Massachusetts history" and "one of the worst industrial calamities in American history".

== Pemberton disaster ==
Howe, together with banker David Nevins, previously bought the mill at an auction for $325,000 and reorganized it as Pemberton Manufacturing Company. The facility itself was closed and sold by John A. Lowell and associates during the Panic of 1857. According to later court testimony reported by The New York Times, Howe escaped just as the structure was falling. During Howe's weekly inspection of the workrooms on the day of the disaster, he recalled, "we discovered at once the columns were falling towards ourselves; the beams were sinking; we then turned around to make an escape; I deemed it extremely doubtful whether we should get out; but we fortunately did."

The Massachusetts Historical Society is now the custodian of papers:

... pertaining to his business, George Howe and Co.; his role in the direction of New England textile mills, including Pemberton Manufacturing Company, Cocheco Manufacturing Company, Hooksett Mills, Massachusetts Mills, Blackton Mills, Stark Mills and Cordis Mills; interaction with other Boston merchants such as grocer S.S. Pierce Co.; real estate ventures in Boston and Roxbury, Mass.; cotton trade with cotton brokerage firms in the South; financial donations to Wesleyan University and Amherst College; and the settlement of his estate by B. M. Stillman. Business records include correspondence and letters, account books, 1828-1856, sales ledgers, 1828-1861, real estate notes, deeds, fabric samples, invoices, receipts, and memoranda books. Also includes ship agreements, 1819-1822, pertaining to trading voyages on the ship Mentor to China, the Pacific, and the western coast of the United States, listing name and rank of crew, duties and restrictions, and wages.
