= Ne Win (disambiguation) =

Ne Win (1911-2002) was a Burmese general, politician and dictator of Burma (1962-1988).

Ne Win (Burmese: နေဝင်း; sometimes spelled Nay Win) may refer to:

- Kawleikgyin Ne Win (1928-1983), two-time Myanmar Academy Award winning actor
- Hayma Ne Win, singer, daughter of Kawleikgyin Ne Win
- Yaza Ne Win, actor, son of Kawleikgyin Ne Win
- Newin Chidchob, Buriram United F.C. chairman

== See also ==
- Nevin (disambiguation)
