= Nivison =

Nivison is a Scottish patronymic surname meaning "son of Nevin". The surname is commonly associated with Midlothian, Scotland.

Notable people with the surname include:

- David S. Nivison (1923–2014), sinologist in the United States
- Jack Nivison (1910–2003), President of the Legislative Council of the Isle of Man
- Josephine Hopper, née Nivison (1883–1968), American painter
- Robert Nivison, 1st Baron Glendyne (1849–1930), Scottish stockbroker

== See also ==
- The Nivison
- Melanie Nivison Oppenheimer
- Thomas Nivison Haining
