= David Nevin =

David Nevin may refer to:

- David W. Nevin (1853–1945), American politician from Easton, Pennsylvania
- David John Nevin, American officer in the Union Army

== See also ==
- David Nevins (disambiguation)
