= Mary Frances Platt =

American writer and activist (1953–2004)

- Born: June 16, 1953; Methuen, Massachusetts, U.S.
- Died: September 15, 2004 (aged 51)
- Other names: MaryFrances Platt
- Occupations: Writer, activist

Mary Frances Platt (June 16, 1953 – September 15, 2004), sometimes written as MaryFrances Platt or mary frances platt, was an American writer and activist in the causes of disability rights, LGBT rights, feminism, and fat liberation.

== Early life and education ==
Platt was born in Methuen, Massachusetts, the daughter of James D. Platt and Mary F. Donovan Platt. Her father was a veteran of World War II. She described her childhood as difficult because she was asthmatic, and she was institutionalized as a teenager. She held a master of education degree (MEd), in counseling psychology.

== Career ==
Platt worked in carnivals as a young woman. She was a writer and activist in the causes of disability rights, gay rights, feminism, and fat liberation. Her essays and poems appeared in activist periodicals including Off Our Backs and Ragged Edge, and in several anthologies. "I am not a disabled woman who is imprisoned in her body or who has overcome or who strives to overcome her disability," she began a 1995 essay. "I am a radical crip who struggles to stay alive in an ableist culture."

After finding support for her concerns at the East Coast Lesbian Festival in 1989, she served on the steering committee of the National Lesbian Conference (NLC) in 1990. She also ran a support group for "adult daughters of addicted and emotionally ill parents" in Northampton, Massachusetts.

== Publications ==
- "Disability and Accessibility Cost Money!" (1990, with Margy Dowzer and Aviva Schmuckler)
- "Creating Accessibility: Organizing for the National Lesbian Conference" (1990)
- "Serious Shit at the NLC" (1990)
- "A View from this Wheelchair" (1990)
- "25 Ways to Oppress a Lesbian with a Disability" (1991)
- "Planning an Accessible Indoor Event" (1992, with Lynn Zelvin and Shemaya Laurel)
- "Reclaiming Femme--Again" (1992)
- "Jennifer's Gift" (1995)
- "Not Imprisoned, Just a Fact of Life" (1995)
- "United in Ableism's Web" (1996)
- "Oxygenated Babe" (1995, 1999)
- "Mae Still Be Alive" (1999)
- "Assisted Suicide: Devaluing Disabled Life" (1999)
- "Passing through Shame" and "Personal Assistance: A job, a politic" (1999)
- "Homesick Song" (2000)
- "The New Refugees" (2003)
- "The Belchertown Crip Railroad" (2003)
- "The Terri Schindler Schiavo Crippled Kickball Team" (2003)
- "Rebeca, Me and the Freak Show" (2004)

== Personal life ==
Platt lived in Belchertown, Massachusetts, but sometimes traveled in her van during the winter, to manage her respiratory and neurological conditions. After a pulmonary embolism in adulthood, she used a motorized wheelchair and supplemental oxygen, and had a service dog named Lucy. She died in 2004, at the age of 51.
