= Nevins Farm and Equine Center =

Animal shelter and hospital in Massachusetts, US

Coordinates: 42°44′04″N 71°11′42″W

Nevins Farm and Equine Center, also known as MSPCA at Nevins Farm and the Methuen Animal Care and Adoption Center at Nevins Farm, is an animal shelter and veterinary hospital in Methuen, Massachusetts, operated by the Massachusetts Society for the Prevention of Cruelty to Animals. Part of the 55-acre (22 ha) property is devoted to Hillside Acre Animal Cemetery, a 4-acre (1.6 ha) animal cemetery.

Nevins Farm "never turns away an animal in need" and is the only open-door horse and farm animal rescue center in New England. According to the MSPCA, the center's "equine, farm animal, and small animal surrender, adoption, and foster care services are unique in the Northeast". Located 30 miles (48 km) north of Boston on a rural swath of land between Interstate 93 and Massachusetts Route 28, each year the center serves about 7,000 animals and is visited by approximately 75,000 people. The farm primarily serves the Merrimack Valley and southern New Hampshire but some of its services, such as the Equine Ambulance Program described below, are international.

== History ==
Nevins Farm before Harriet Nevins donated it to the MSPCA

In 1917, Mrs. Harriet Nevins donated her farm of rolling pastures in Methuen to the MSPCA so that it could be used as a rest home for horses and other unwanted or abandoned animals. The donation was accompanied by a $5,000 bequest toward building construction and the purchase of necessary farm implements and machinery. First known as "The Rest Home", the property was used for retired police horses and other horses who worked on the then-cobblestone streets of Boston. Arrangements made with horse owners allowed horses that were still working animals to spend time grazing and relaxing in the fields of Nevins Farm. A common agreement was one in which a horses would rotate between spending a month on the farm and a month in Boston working.

A shelter for small animals was added to the Methuen facility in 1924 and as motor vehicles replaced horse-drawn carriages and fewer horses worked on the streets, the role of the farm began to change. While involvement with smaller animals has increased, Nevins Farm's concern for large animals has remained a central part of its mission. In 1994, the farm launched the Equine Ambulance Program to offer emergency rescue and transport of disabled horses in New England and ambulance services events involving horses worldwide.

George and Connie Noble of Concord, Massachusetts, donated the funds for Nevins Farm's 18,000-square-foot (1,700 m^{2}) adoption center building that opened in 2004. The new facility is officially known as the Noble Family Animal Care and Adoption Center at Nevins Farm.

== Adoption ==
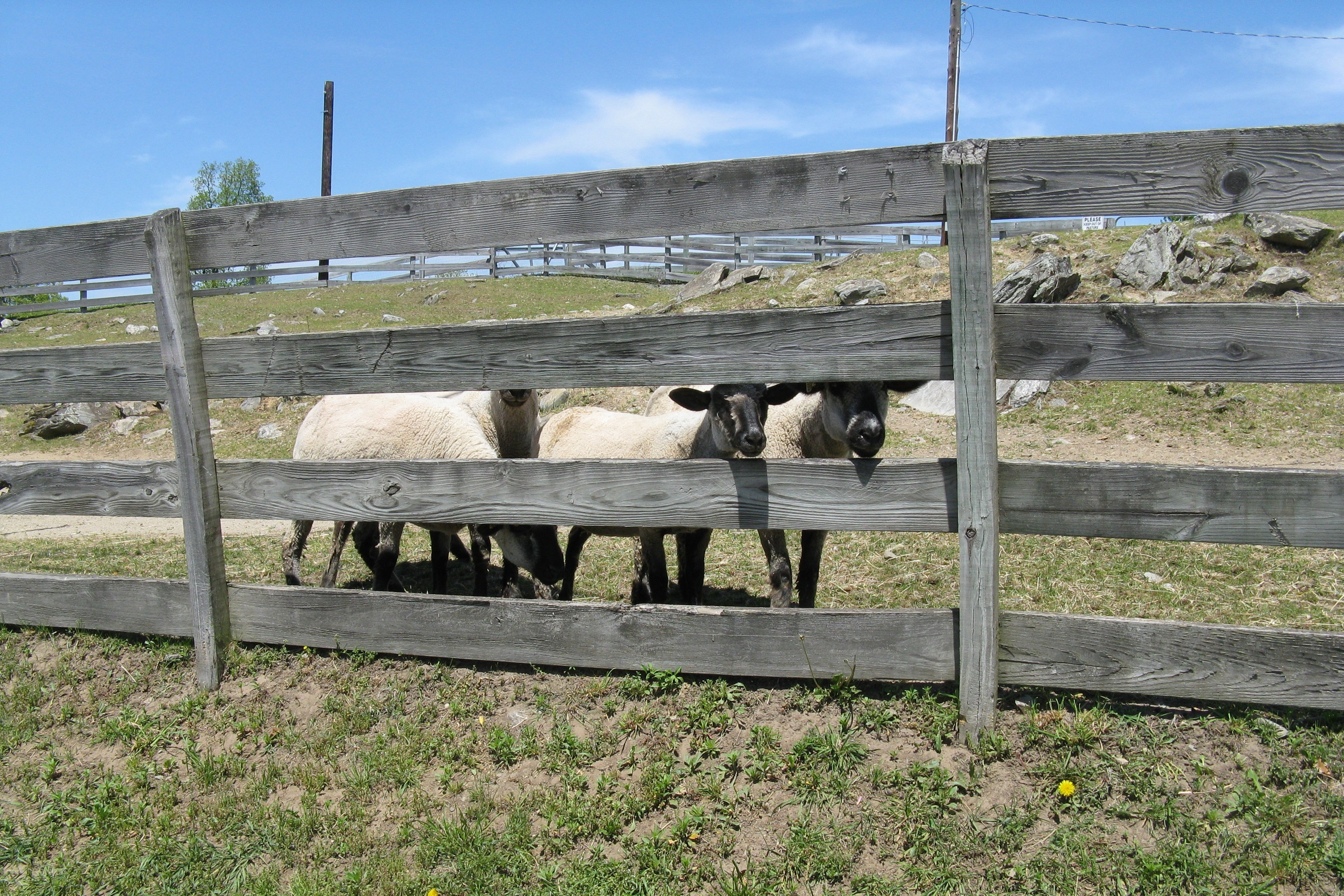
Sheep at Nevins Farm, May 2008

Today, finding suitable people to adopt animals is primary focus of the farm. Animals available for adoption at Nevins Farm include both typical household pets such as cats, dogs, ferrets, gerbils, guinea pigs, hamsters, mice, parakeets and other small birds, rabbits, rats, and turtles as well as farm animals like chickens, cows, ducks, geese, goats, horses, pigs, and sheep. More unusual animals are sometimes available as well as was the case when the farm acquired a barnyard full new animals that included miniature horses and Nigerian Dwarf Goats from a farm in Southwick, Massachusetts.

According to the MSPCA:

Cocker Spaniels to Siamese Cats to Thoroughbreds to Pygmy Goats ... Shelters take in many homeless purebreds, as well as mixed breeds, and the MSPCA at Nevins Farm works with other humane societies and rescue groups to help find them loving, permanent homes. If you are looking for a purebred companion, you may find one right here.

It is more difficult to find homes for larger animals and according to one employee "They tend to stay a little longer at the farm animal shelter ... It depends when the right person comes around."

Summer is the busiest time of year at the Nevins Farm. According to Stephen Zawistowski, a former executive vice president of the American Society for the Prevention of Cruelty to Animals (a non-profit organization without formal connections to the MSPCA), "It's cat season ... Cats tend to reproduce based on, essentially, the solar cycle ... The weather's good. They're more likely to survive. This is particularly true in the Northeast." Zawistowski endorsed the MSPCA staff at Nevins Farm as being able to handle the overload while compromising neither the animals' health nor their safety.

== Events ==
Among the fundraising and other events held at or benefiting Nevins Farm are the following:

- Annual Rock Run Motorcycle Ride to the Topsfield Fairgrounds
- Blackdog Invitational Golf Tournament
- Evening for Animals Silent & Live Auction
- Homeward Bound Adoption Day
- Horses Helping Horses Trail Ride at Salisbury Beach State Reservation
- Nevins Winter Festival

== Cemetery ==
The Hillside Acre Animal Cemetery is a pet cemetery that occupies four acres (1.6 ha) of landscaped terrain. The cemetery serves as the resting place of over 18,000 "beloved animal companions" as well as a number of military dogs.

The cemetery offers animals allows patrons to erect marble or granite tombstones for their deceased animals after burial and provides perpetual care for each grave. Each patron is given a key to the locked iron fence surrounding the graveyard. Cremation services are also available allowing patrons to choose between interring their pets' ashes in a grave, taking them home in a sealed urn, or having them scattered. Staff also serves as a resource for who seek the help of support groups to help them deal with the loss of their pets.
