= Sylvester Nevins =

American politician

Sylvester Nevins was a member of the Wisconsin State Senate.

== Biography ==
Nevins was born in New York City. He graduated from Middlebury College. In 1859, Nevins moved to La Crosse, Wisconsin. Additionally, he also lived in Sherwood (town), Wisconsin. He died in 1901. Nevins, Wisconsin is named after him.

== Career ==
Nevins represented the 31st District in the Senate during the 1875 and 1876 sessions. Previously, he had been a La Crosse alderman in 1871, 1872 and 1873 and a candidate for Mayor of La Crosse in 1874. He was a Republican.
