= Charles H. Bigelow =

American architect

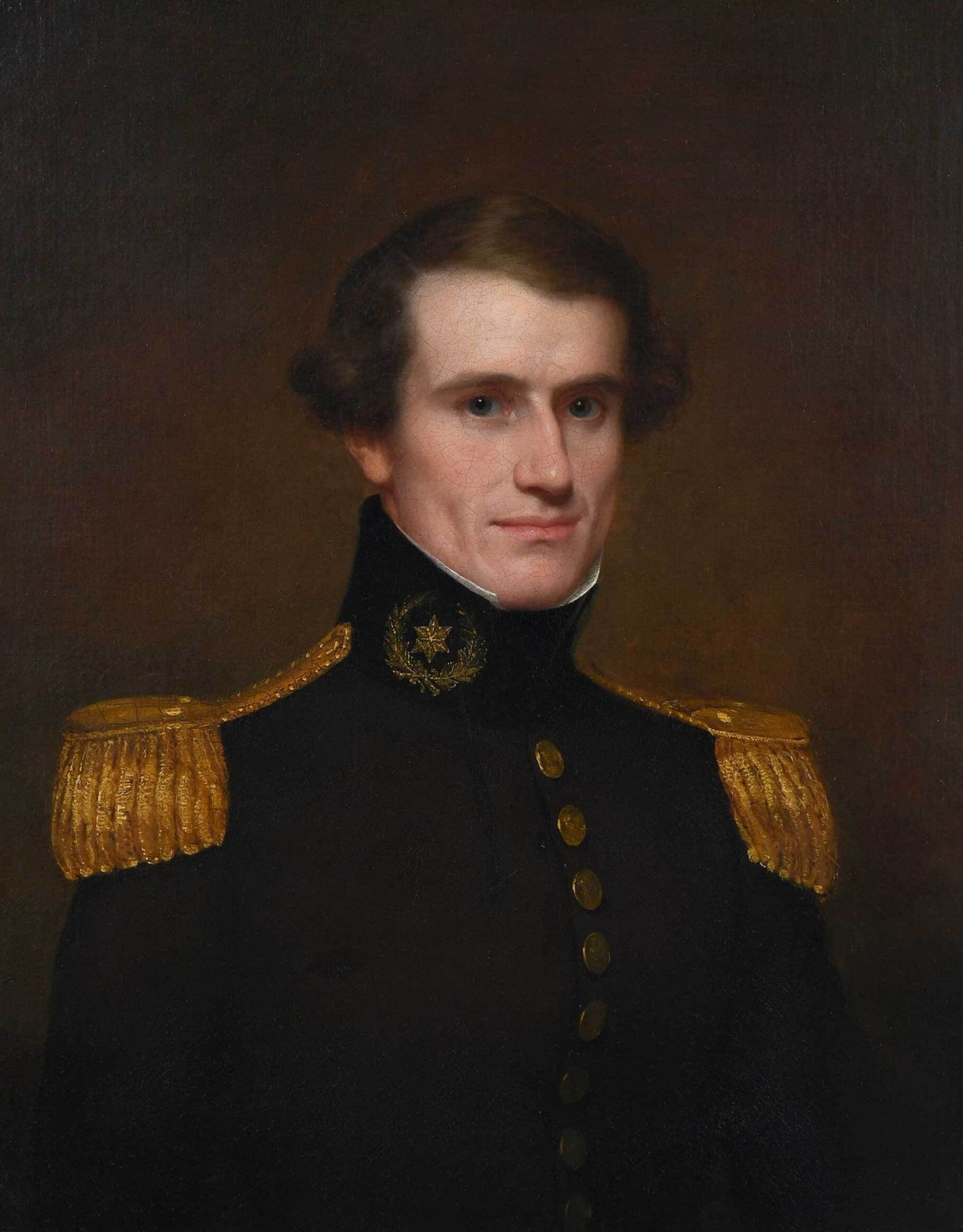
- Portrait, 1856
- Born: Charles Henry Bigelow; July 13, 1814; Watertown, Massachusetts, U.S.
- Died: April 15, 1862 (aged 47); New Bedford, Massachusetts, U.S.
- Education: United States Military Academy
- Occupations: Engineer; architect
- Spouse: Harriet Briggs

Charles Henry Bigelow (July 13, 1814 – April 15, 1862) of Lowell, Massachusetts was a 19th-century engineer and architect. Born in Watertown, Massachusetts, Bigelow was a graduate of West Point, ranking second in the class of 1835. He married Harriet Briggs, daughter of the late Massachusetts Governor George N. Briggs. He died in New Bedford, Massachusetts in 1862 at the age of 47. On March 31, 1847, Bigelow was one of a group of influential citizens in Lawrence, Massachusetts that founded and chartered the Franklin Library Association, now the Lawrence Free Library. Bigelow was the Association's first president.

== Career ==
Bigelow served in the United States Army Corps of Engineers until April 25, 1846, working as an assistant engineer during the construction of Fort Warren and Fort Independence at Boston Harbor and leaving active duty as a captain.

Bigelow was the chief engineer of the Pemberton Mill, the collapse of which "is likely the worst industrial accident in Massachusetts history" and "one of the worst industrial calamities in American history". According to one account:

Jesse Glover, overseer of repairs testified at the inquest that he had always considered the building weak. John B. Tuttle, superintendent of brick work testified that he had complained to the architect, Bigelow, that he thought the walls were insufficient. Mr. Bigelow in turn blamed the owners. Bigelow said that it was the owners who were responsible for all the purchasing and the approval of the iron castings.

Bigelow also worked as a consultant on the Augusta Canal.
