= David Nevins =

David Nevins may refer to:

- David Nevins Sr. (1809–1881), industrialist
- David Nevins Jr. (1839–1898), his son, industrialist
- David Nevins (television producer), American television producer and screenwriter
