= Henry C. Nevins Home for Aged and Incurables =

- U.S. National Register of Historic Places

- Location within Massachusetts Location within the United States
- Location: 110 Broadway, Methuen, Massachusetts
- Coordinates: 42°43′16″N 71°10′58″W
- Built: 1906
- Architect: Harris M. Stephenson
- Architectural style: Colonial
- MPS: Methuen MRA
- NRHP reference No.: 84002406
- Added to NRHP: January 20, 1984

Henry C. Nevins Home for Aged and Incurables was built in 1906 in Methuen, Massachusetts. It was listed on the National Register of Historic Places in 1984. It and the Nevins Memorial Library, located at 305 Broadway were built by for Henry C. Nevins and his family as a memorial to his father, David C. Nevins, Sr. Both buildings were listed on the National Register on the same day.

== History ==
The Nevins Home was built on the site of the home of Charles Ingalls, one of Methuen's early hat manufacturers. The property was acquired in 1905 by the executors for the estate of Julie F. H. Nevins who died in 1904. Mrs. Nevins left $100,000, plus an endowment, for construction of the Henry C. Nevins Home for Aged and Incurable. Ground breaking began in June 1905 and dedication of the new facility took place in July of the following year.

The home was designed by Harris M. Stephenson, Boston architect.

== Current Use ==
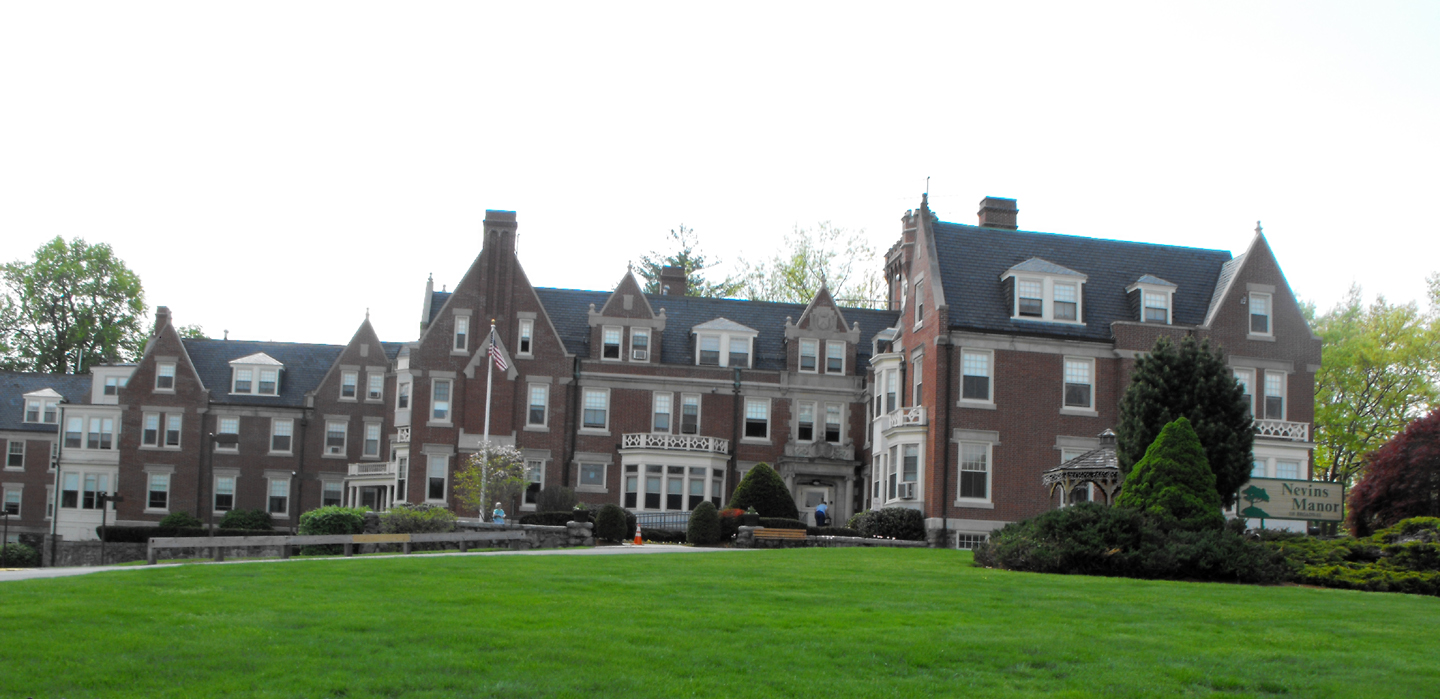
The Nevins Nursing & Rehabilitation Centre present day

The original Nevins Home remained in operation from 1906 until 1997 when it was renovated to provide 44 studio and one bedroom HUD-subsidized apartments for the elderly. A much larger modern nursing care facility was constructed behind the original structure. The facility remains the center piece of the Nevins Family of Services, a non-profit organization still serving the Merrimack Valley.

== See also ==
- National Register of Historic Places listings in Methuen, Massachusetts
- National Register of Historic Places listings in Essex County, Massachusetts
