= Nevison =

Nevison is a surname. Notable people with the surname include:

- John Nevison (1639–1684), British highwayman
- Ron Nevison, American record producer

== See also ==
- Nevinson
