= Nevins, Wisconsin =

- Unincorporated community
- Location within Wisconsin Location within the United States
- Coordinates: 44°29′47″N 90°21′54″W
- Country: United States
- State: Wisconsin
- County: Clark
- Town: Sherwood
- Elevation: 1,070 ft (330 m)
- Time zone: UTC-6 (Central (CST))
  - Summer (DST): UTC-5 (CDT)
- Area codes: 715 & 534
- GNIS feature ID: 1577745

Nevins is an unincorporated community located in the town of Sherwood, Clark County, Wisconsin, United States.

== History ==
The community was named after Sylvester Nevins, Wisconsin state senator and lumber businessman.
