= Nevinson =

Nevinson is a surname. Notable people with the surname include:

- C. R. W. Nevinson (1889–1946), English painter, etcher and lithographer
- Gennie Nevinson, Australian actress
- George Nevinson (1882–1963), British water polo player
- Henry Nevinson (1856–1941), British writer
- Margaret Nevinson (1858–1932), British suffragist
- Nancy Nevinson (1918–2012), English actress
- John Nevison (1910–1987), English cricketer

== See also ==
- Nevins (disambiguation)
- Nevison
