= Sherwood, Clark County, Wisconsin =

Town in Wisconsin, US

Sherwood, Wisconsin
- Town
- Town of Sherwood
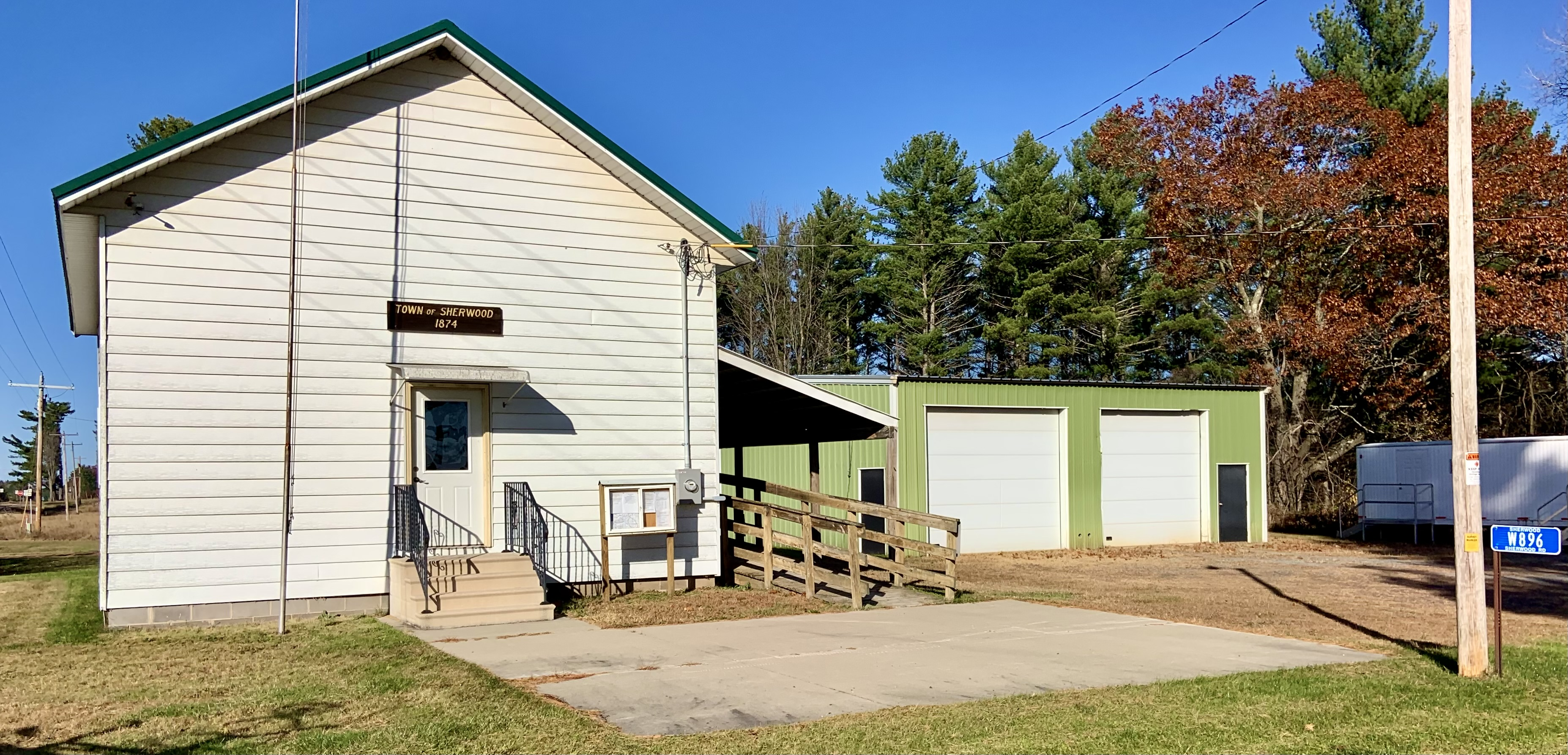
- Sherwood Town Hall

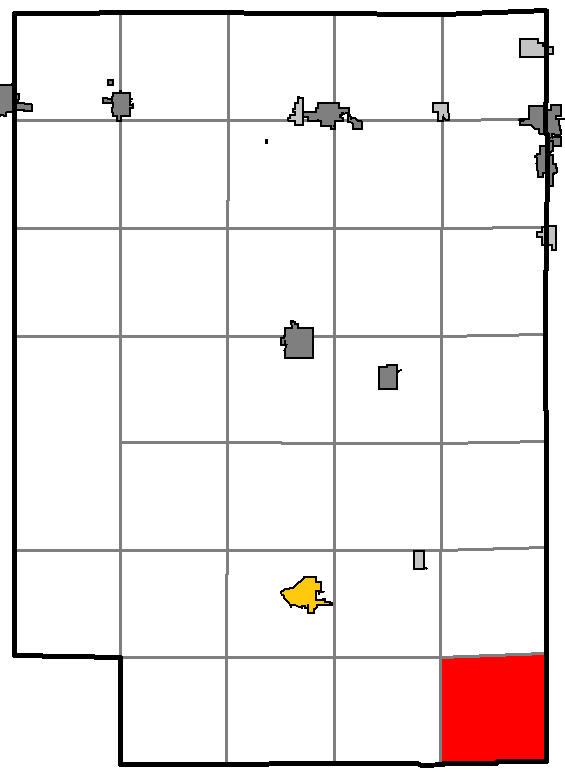
- Location of Sherwood, Clark County

- Location of Clark County, Wisconsin
- Coordinates: 44°28′49″N 90°22′32″W
- Country: United States
- State: Wisconsin
- County: Clark

Area
  - Total: 35.64 sq mi (92.3 km^{2})
  - Land: 35.57 sq mi (92.1 km^{2})
  - Water: 0.37 sq mi (0.96 km^{2})

Population (2020)
  - Total: 230
  - Density: 6.5/sq mi (2.5/km^{2})
- Time zone: UTC-6 (Central (CST))
  - Summer (DST): UTC-5 (CDT)
- Area code(s): 715 and 534
- GNIS feature ID: 1584151

There is also the Village of Sherwood in Calumet County.

Sherwood is a town in Clark County in the U.S. state of Wisconsin. The population was 230 at the 2020 census. The unincorporated community of Nevins is located in the town.

== Geography ==
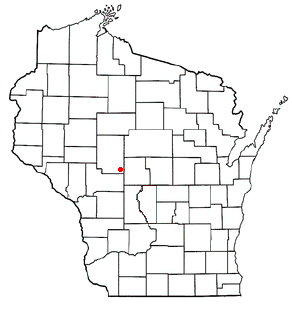
Location of Sherwood, Wisconsin

According to the United States Census Bureau, the town has a total area of 36.0 square miles (93.1 km^{2}), of which, 35.7 square miles (92.6 km^{2}) of it is land and 0.2 square miles (0.6 km^{2}) of it (0.61%) is water.

== Demographics ==
At the 2000 United States census there were 252 people, 90 households, and 73 families in the town. The population density was 7.1 people per square mile (2.7/km^{2}). There were 152 housing units at an average density of 4.3/sq mi (1.6/km^{2}). The racial makeup of the town was 96.43% White, 0.79% African American, 0.40% Native American, 0.40% from other races, and 1.98% from two or more races. Hispanic or Latino of any race were 0.40%.

Of the 90 households 31.1% had children under the age of 18 living with them, 70.0% were married couples living together, 4.4% had a female householder with no husband present, and 17.8% were non-families. 16.7% of households were one person and 3.3% were one person aged 65 or older. The average household size was 2.80 and the average family size was 3.12.

The age distribution was 25.8% under the age of 18, 5.6% from 18 to 24, 27.4% from 25 to 44, 19.0% from 45 to 64, and 22.2% 65 or older. The median age was 40 years. For every 100 females, there were 101.6 males. For every 100 females age 18 and over, there were 105.5 males.

The median household income was $36,250 and the median family income was $36,250. Males had a median income of $28,438 versus $23,750 for females. The per capita income for the town was $16,365. About 2.8% of families and 4.5% of the population were below the poverty line, including none of those under the age of 18 and 3.6% of those 65 or over.
