= Nevin =

Nevin may refer to:

== Surname ==
- Nevin (surname)

== Given name ==
Popular Turkish feminine name (from "nevîn" in Persian, meaning "newness").

- Nevin Çokay (1930–2012), Turkish painter
- Nevin Efe (1947–2026), Turkish actress
- Nevin Halıcı (born 1941), Turkish culinary culture and food researcher and writer
- Nevin Nevlin (born 1985), Turkish basketball player
- Nevin Özütok (born 1960), Turkish-born Dutch politician
- Nevin Yanıt (born 1986), Turkish sprinter

Nevin is a common surname of Irish/Scottish origins, but is also used as a given name in the Anglosphere.

- Nevin Harrison (born 2002), American sprint canoeist
- Nevin Saroya (born 1980), English footballer
- Nevin S. Scrimshaw (1918–2013), American food scientist
- Nevin Spence (1990–2012), Irish rugby player

== Places ==
- Anglicised name for Nefyn, Welsh town
- Nevin, Los Angeles

== See also ==
- Nevins (disambiguation)
- Nevinson
