= Pemberton Mill =

Factory in Massachusetts, United States, which collapsed in 1860

Pemberton Mill collapse
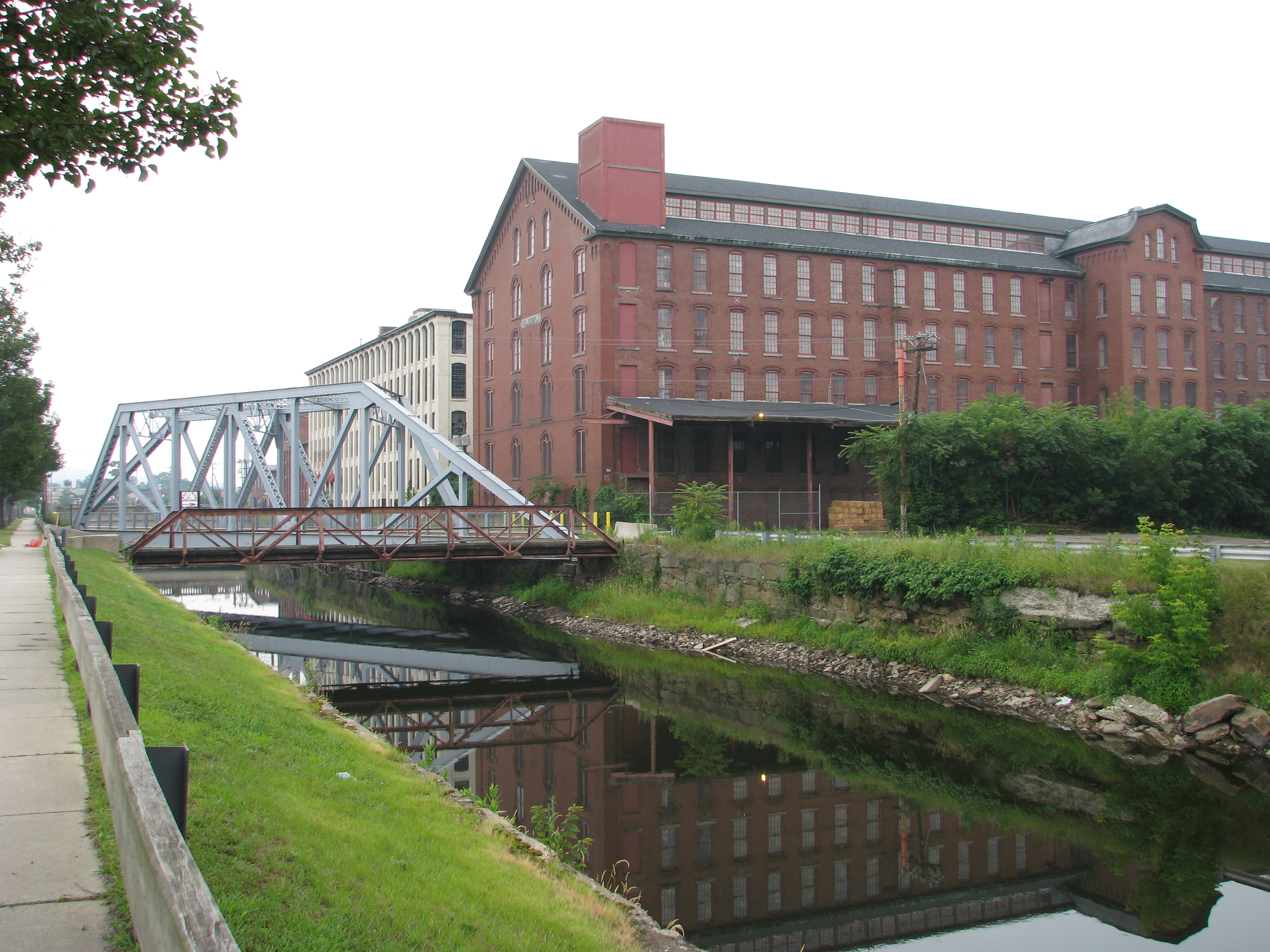
- The rebuilt mill
- Date: January 10, 1860; 166 years ago
- Time: 5 p.m.
- Location: 216 Canal St Lawrence, Massachusetts 01840; 42°42′20″N 71°09′16″W
- Cause: Structural failure from design flaws and overloading
- Deaths: 88–145
- Injuries: 166

The Pemberton Mill was a large textiles factory in Lawrence, Massachusetts, originally built in 1853. On January 10, 1860, at around 4:30 p.m., a section of the building suddenly collapsed, trapping several hundred workers underneath the rubble, in what has been called "the worst industrial accident in Massachusetts history" and "one of the worst industrial calamities in American history." Of the hundreds crushed under the wreckage, an estimated 88 to 145 of them were killed instantly, and 166 were removed, albeit critically injured.

Following the incident, as search-and-rescue efforts continued in an effort to locate survivors or bodies, a volunteer's handheld oil lamp was accidentally knocked, spilling its burning oil onto the wreckage; a massive fire soon enveloped the site, preventing the rescue of many potential survivors. The blaze spread quickly, due to the mill containing a large amount of lumber, as well as chemical-laden machinery and the large amounts of cotton, denim, flannel, and other flammable materials produced therein.

Investigators attributed the disaster to substandard construction that was then drastically overloaded with second-floor equipment, all evident and preventable. The event was cited in improvements to industrial construction and workplace safety. The mill was soon rebuilt in place.

== Background ==
The Pemberton Mill was built in 1853 as a five-story building 280 feet (85 m) long and 84 feet (26 m) wide. Its chief engineer was Charles H. Bigelow. Its construction was financed by John A. Lowell and his brother-in-law J. Pickering Putnam at a cost of US$850,000 (equivalent to about $33,000,000 in 2025). This was called "a fortune for those times."

During a financial panic in 1857, Lowell and Putnam sold the mill to George Howe and David Nevins, Sr. at a $350,000 loss. The new owners jammed more machinery into their factory attempting to boost its profits. The mill ran with great success, earning $1,500,000 (equivalent to about $52,000,000 in 2025) per year, and had 2,700 spindles and 700 looms in operation at the time of the disaster.

== 1860 collapse ==
David Nevins, Sr. was co-owner of the Pemberton Mill at the time of the disaster.

Shortly before 5:00 p.m. on a Tuesday afternoon in 1860, workers in nearby factories watched with horror as the Pemberton Mill buckled and then collapsed with a mighty crash. According to later court testimony reported by The New York Times, owner George Howe escaped as the structure was falling.

Dozens were killed instantly and more than six hundred workers, many of them women and children, were trapped in the ruins. When the winter sun set, rescuers built bonfires to illuminate their efforts, revealing "faces crushed beyond recognition, open wounds in which the bones showed through a paste of dried blood, brick dust, and shredded clothing."

Around 9:30 p.m., with many people still trapped in the wreck of the factory, someone accidentally knocked over an oil lamp. Flames raced across the cotton waste and splintered wood – some of it soaked with oil. One trapped man cut his own throat rather than be consumed by the approaching flames; he was rescued, but died from his other injuries. As the fire grew, rescuers, physicians, families of the trapped victims, and spectators were all driven back by the conflagration. The screams coming from the ruins were soon silenced, leaving rescuers to eventually discover only the burned, smoldering remains of "brick, mortar and human bones ... promiscuously mingled."

American Heritage magazine gives this account:

Suddenly there was a sharp rattle, and then a prolonged, deafening crash. A section of the building's brick wall seemed to bulge out and explode, and then, literally in seconds, the Pemberton collapsed. Tons of machinery crashed down through crumpling floors, dragging trapped, screaming victims along in their downward path. At a few minutes after five, the factory was a heap of twisted iron, splintered beams, pulverized bricks, and agonized, imprisoned human flesh.

The Boston Almanac and Business Directory notes:

The Pemberton Mills at Lawrence, Mass., ... (did) fall-in while nearly 800 operatives are at work, and bury many in the ruins. About four hours after the fall, a fire breaks out, and destroys those not extricated from the ruins. More than 115 people perish by the awful catastrophe, and 165 are more or less injured.

The Boston Globe describes the carnage more vividly:

The scene after the fall was one of indescribable horror. Hundreds of men, women, and children were buried in the ruins. Some assured their friends that they were uninjured, but imprisoned by the timbers upon and about them. Others were dying and dead. Every nerve was strained to relieve the poor unfortunates, when, sad to relate, a lantern broke and set fire to the wreck. In a few moments the ruins were a sheet of flames. Fourteen are known to have been burned to death in the sight of their loved ones, who were powerless to aid them.

== Victims ==
Estimates of the number killed by the collapse and subsequent fire vary from 88 to 145. Most were recent immigrants, either Irish or Scots, many of them young women.

Irish and Scots were the majority, and the casualty list is indicative of New England's labor force at that time. It includes Yankees from Maine and New Hampshire, and immigrants from Germany and Switzerland. All the churches of Lawrence – Baptists, Catholic, Congregationalist, Episcopalian, Methodist, Presbyterian, Unitarian, and Universalist – had parishioners to console after the disaster.

== Aftermath ==
The disaster was determined to have been caused by a number of preventable factors. Ignoring already questionable load limits, extra textile machinery had been crowded into the upper floors of the factory. Investigators also discovered substandard construction. The brick walls were improperly mortared and supported. The iron columns supporting the floors were cheap and brittle but had been installed nonetheless.

In the wake of the disaster, area ministers delivered "sermons on God's inscrutable wrath" but it was apparent that blame lay in the manner in which the factory was built and operated. The Scientific American wrote, "...there is now no doubt that the fall of the building was owing to the most gross negligence and want of fidelity in casting the columns." The tragedy became a rallying point to improve safety standards in industrial workplaces. It also inspired the popular sketch "The Tenth of January" by author Elizabeth Stuart Phelps Ward.

Abraham Lincoln visited Lawrence and the Pemberton Mill site on March 2, 1860, discussed in a letter to his wife Mary Lincoln. He visited Lawrence after giving a campaign speech in Manchester, New Hampshire as part of a campaign tour with his sons. Lincoln stayed in Lawrence for four hours before leaving by train for Exeter, New Hampshire.

David Nevins, Sr. bought out his partner and rebuilt the mill. After his death it passed to his sons, David Nevins, Jr. and Henry Cotton Nevins.

In 1922, the rebuilt mill was one of the Lawrence mills temporarily shut down during the New England Textile Strike, which was sparked by an attempted wage cut.

== See also ==
- 2013 Savar building collapse, the deadliest accidental structural collapse in modern history
- Grover Shoe Factory disaster
- List of disasters in Massachusetts by death toll
- List of industrial disasters
