= David Nevins Sr. =

American businessman

- Born: December 12, 1809; Salem, New Hampshire
- Died: March 19, 1881 (aged 71); Methuen, Massachusetts
- Occupation: Industrialist
- Spouse: Eliza S. Coffin (m. 1838)
- Children: Henry Coffin Nevins; David Nevins Jr.

Signature
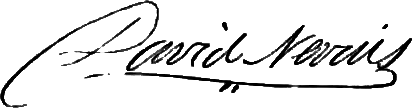

David Nevins Sr. (December 12, 1809 – March 19, 1881) was a wealthy New England industrialist. As a child of a middle-class family in Methuen, David Nevins Sr. attended a local common school or district school, typical in rural New England during the early 1800s. Raised in a Protestant, likely Congregationalist, household, absorbing New England’s emphasis on discipline, education, and self-reliance. A real education from hands-on experience in his father’s mercantile business. By his late teens, he was working in Salem, Massachusetts a hub for trade and shipping, where he honed skills in finance, trade, and networking.

Nevins owned a prominent home in Lawrence, where he spent much of his career managing his textile mills. Historical accounts, such as The History of Lawrence, Massachusetts (1880), describe him living in a “fine mansion” befitting his status as a leading industrialist. The mansion was likely in the Garden Street or Prospect Hill area, where Lawrence’s elite built grand homes in the mid-19th century. These neighborhoods were close to the city’s industrial core, including the Pemberton Mill, and featured large estates with views of the Merrimack River. No precise address (e.g., street number) is consistently documented in available sources. City directories from the 1860s–1870s list Nevins as a resident of Lawrence but often omit exact addresses for prominent figures.

Nevins had business interests in New York City and spent time there, particularly later in life. He likely maintained a home or apartment in Manhattan, where many industrialists kept urban residences. Nearby Phillips Academy in Andover (founded 1778) was a prestigious option, but no records confirm his enrollment. If he attended, it would have provided advanced instruction in mathematics, Latin, and commerce.

== Biography ==
David Nevins was born in Salem, New Hampshire on December 12, 1809. His family moved to Methuen, Massachusetts when he was very young.

== Pemberton Mill ownership ==
Unlike the Irish immigrant workers at Pemberton Mill, who often had no formal education and faced extreme poverty, Nevins’ upbringing was privileged, with access to basic schooling and family support. He owned the Pemberton Mill in nearby Lawrence, Massachusetts. The Pemberton Mill collapse occurred on January 10, 1860, in Lawrence, Massachusetts. The five-story textile mill, built in 1853, was a major employer, particularly for Irish immigrants, many of whom were women and children. At the time of the collapse, around 600–800 workers were inside, though exact numbers vary. The official death toll was 88, with estimates of 116–145 deaths and hundreds injured, many permanently disabled. The disaster was one of the deadliest industrial accidents in U.S. history. Investigations pinned the collapse on substandard construction, specifically defective cast-iron columns that were too weak to support the mill’s weight. Poor oversight, cost-cutting by owners, and overloading the structure with heavy machinery exacerbated the issue. The mill was known to vibrate heavily during operation, a warning sign ignored. The collapse sparked a fire, trapping workers in rubble. Rescue efforts were chaotic; some victims were burned alive as lanterns ignited cotton dust. Community members, including families of workers, aided rescues. Public donations raised ~$60,000 (equivalent to ~$2 million today) for victims’ families, but distribution was uneven, and many received little. The disaster fueled outrage over industrial working conditions, leading Massachusetts to implement factory inspections and safety laws, a precursor to modern labor regulations. The mill’s columns were cast iron, prone to brittleness, and spaced too far apart. Engineers later criticized the design as fundamentally unsound for a building of its size and load. Economic Context: The mill produced cotton goods, employing ~1,000 at its peak. After the collapse, it was rebuilt within a year, resuming operations despite public criticism. David Nevins Sr. faced no legal consequences, though his reputation suffered. As the majority stakeholder, Nevins was responsible for the mill’s design and maintenance decisions. Evidence suggests he approved cheaper materials to maximize profits, a common practice among industrialists.

In 1860, there were no workplace safety laws in Massachusetts, and factory owners were rarely held accountable for accidents. The disaster prompted the state to introduce safety inspections, but these came too late to affect Nevins directly.

His reputation as a benevolent employer was shattered. Nevins had been a prominent figure in Lawrence, funding civic projects, but the disaster reframed him as a symbol of industrial greed. Survivor accounts and editorials highlighted his failure to address known structural issues, like the mill’s excessive vibrations. Nevins, a wealthy industrialist, was vilified in the press and by the Lawrence community, particularly among Irish immigrants who made up most of the workforce. Newspapers, such as the Boston Daily Atlas, criticized his cost-cutting measures, like using substandard materials, as a root cause. Public sentiment painted him as prioritizing profits over worker safety.

Newspapers like the Boston Daily Atlas (January 1860) mention the mill’s destruction but focus on human losses, not insurance. Some accounts hint at Nevins’ financial recovery, noting the mill was rebuilt by late 1860, suggesting access to significant funds, likely from insurance and personal wealth. No payments were made to victims or their families from insurance, as 19th-century policies did not include liability for worker injuries or deaths. Public donations (~$60,000, or ~$2M today) supported survivors, not Nevins’ funds. The mill was rebuilt within a year (by late 1860) and resumed operations, indicating Nevins had sufficient capital. Insurance payouts, combined with his personal wealth and ongoing revenue from other mills (e.g., Bay State Mills), likely funded the reconstruction, estimated to cost $200,000–$300,000. The swift rebuild suggests a significant insurance contribution, as Nevins alone may not have covered such expenses without liquidating other assets.

== Personal life & death ==
He married Eliza S. Coffin in 1838, and they had two children – Henry Coffin Nevins and David Nevins Jr. He died in Methuen on March 19, 1881.

Nevins is the namesake of the Nevins Memorial Library. An author wrote, "The public spirit and generosity of the Nevins family seems to have no bounds in the town in which they made their home".

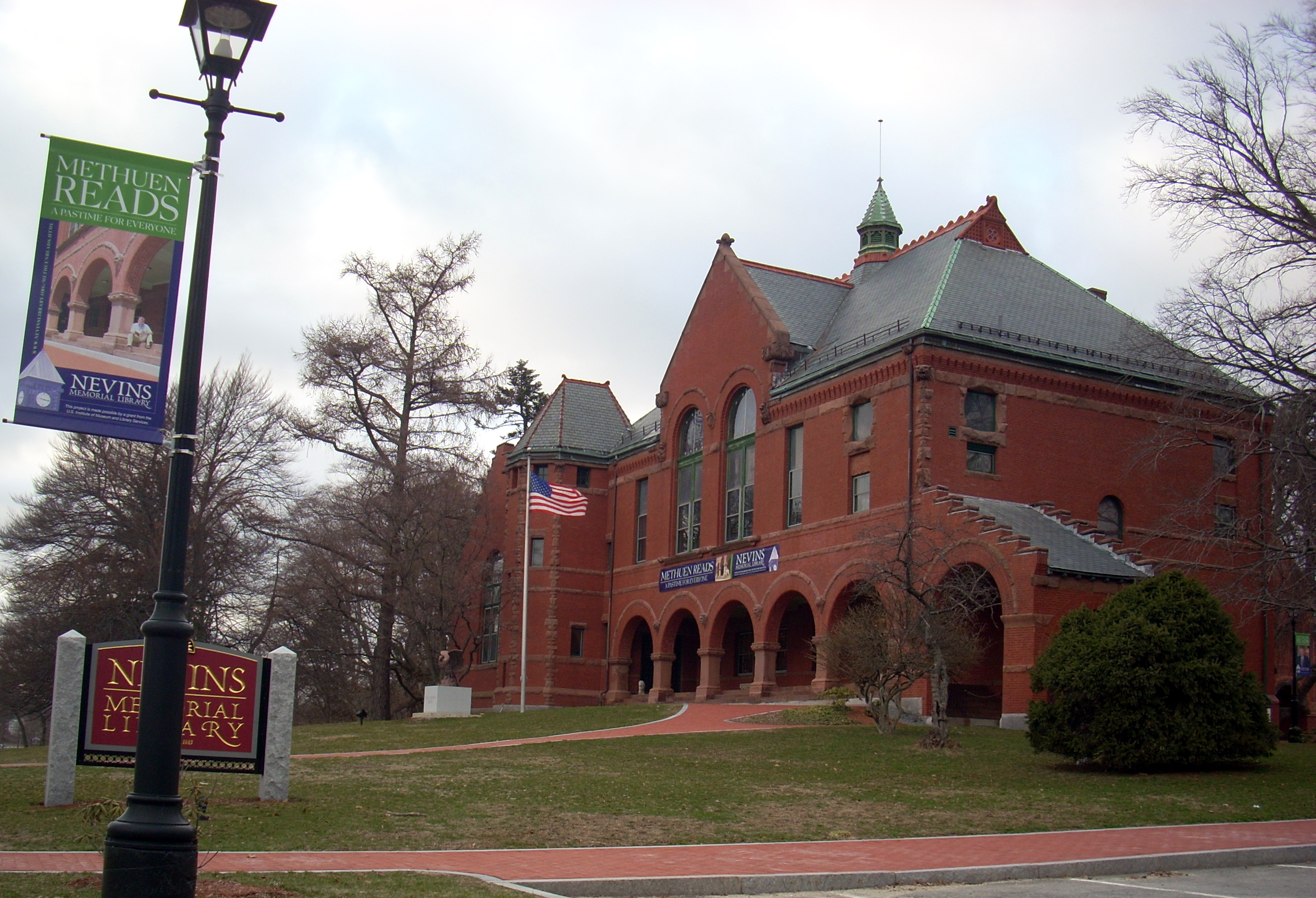
Nevins Memorial Library

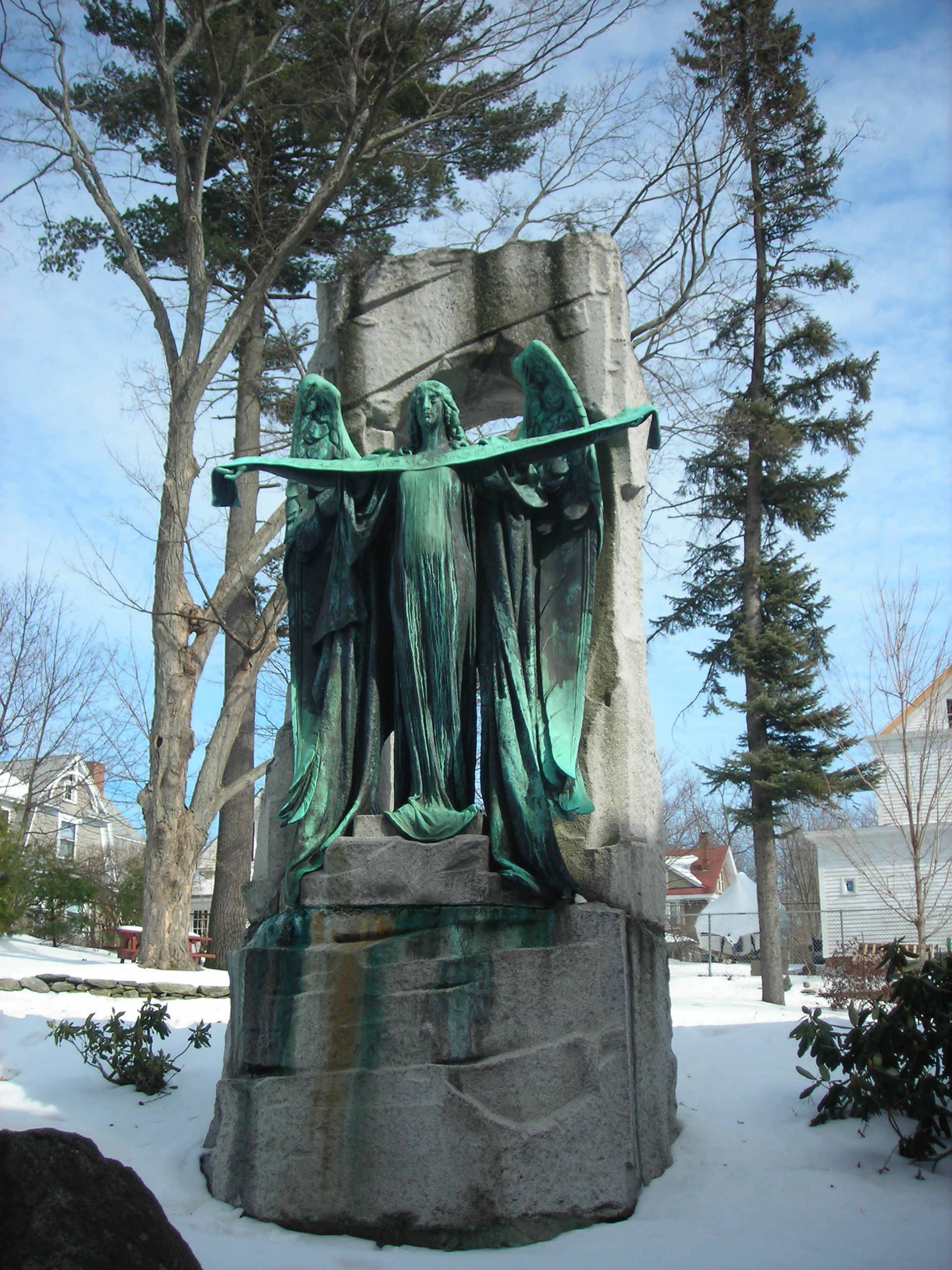
Angel of Life (1896)
