= Nevins Memorial Library =

- U.S. National Register of Historic Places
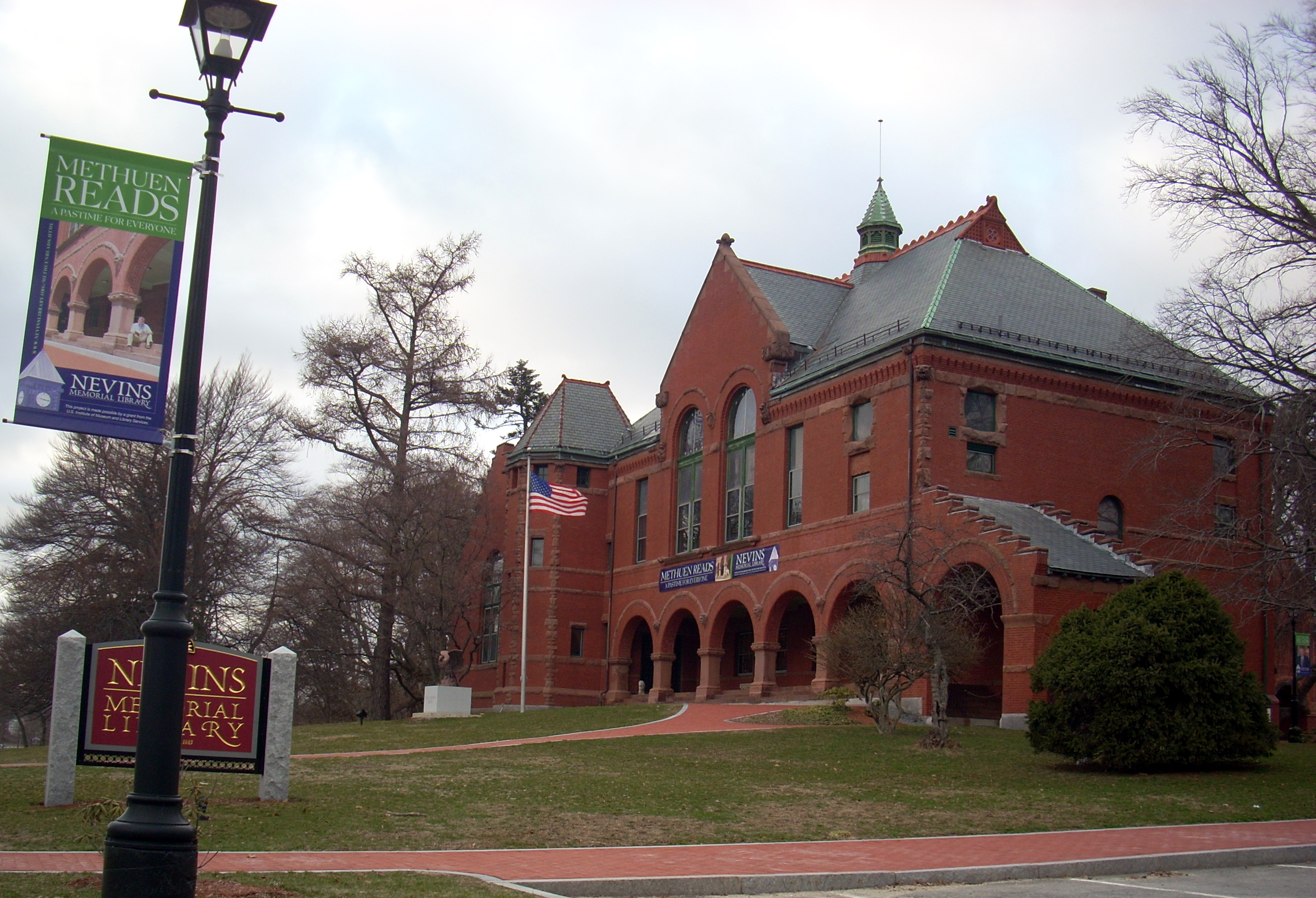

- Location within Massachusetts Location within the United States
- Location: 305 Broadway, Methuen, Massachusetts
- Coordinates: 42°43′52″N 71°11′25″W
- Built: 1883
- Architect: Samuel J. F. Thayer
- Architectural style: Romanesque
- MPS: Methuen MRA
- NRHP reference No.: 84002407
- Added to NRHP: January 20, 1984

The Nevins Memorial Library at 305 Broadway in Methuen, Massachusetts was built in 1883 to honor David Nevins, Sr. as a memorial gift from his wife Eliza Nevins (née Eliza Coffin), his elder son David Nevins, Jr., and his younger son Henry Coffin Nevins. The library is located at 305 Broadway in Methuen and was listed on the National Register of Historic Places in 1984.

The Nevins Memorial Library offers resources including free Wi-Fi internet access, book clubs, an outreach program to deliver books and media for homebound individuals, and so on. The library is also the custodian of the Nevins Memorial Library Historic Collection, much of which is in storage and for which viewing appointments should be made. The collection includes manuscripts and printed materials, genealogical resources, vital records, assorted objet d'art and collectables, and the stained glass windows of the library itself.

== Gallery ==
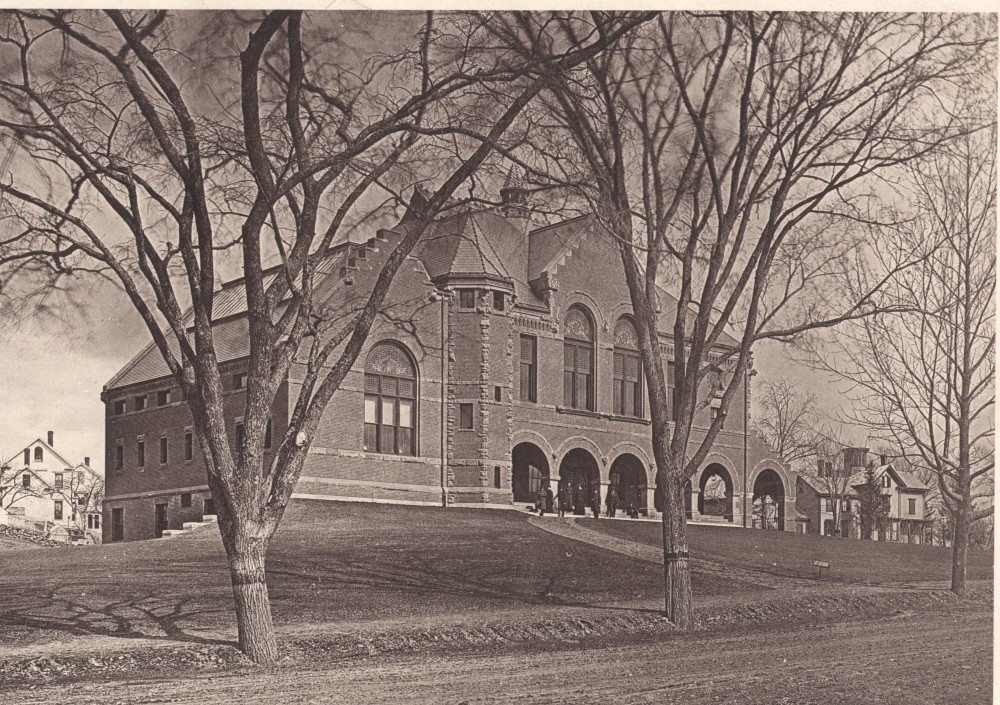
Photograph of the newly constructed Nevins Memorial Library in 1883

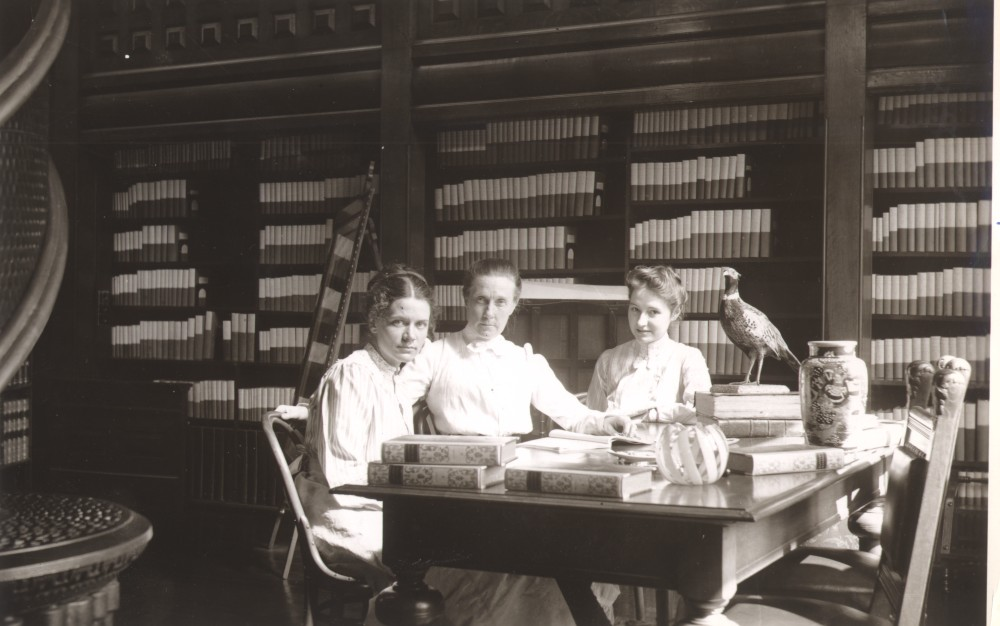
Photograph of three of Nevins Memorial Library's earliest librarians. Seated at the table in the Reference Room are: Miss Alice Chase, Miss Crosby and Miss Tooday Dorsey. Reference books are in the background and artifacts from the Nevins Historic Collection (Pheasant, Vase, Table and Richsonian Chair) are visible.

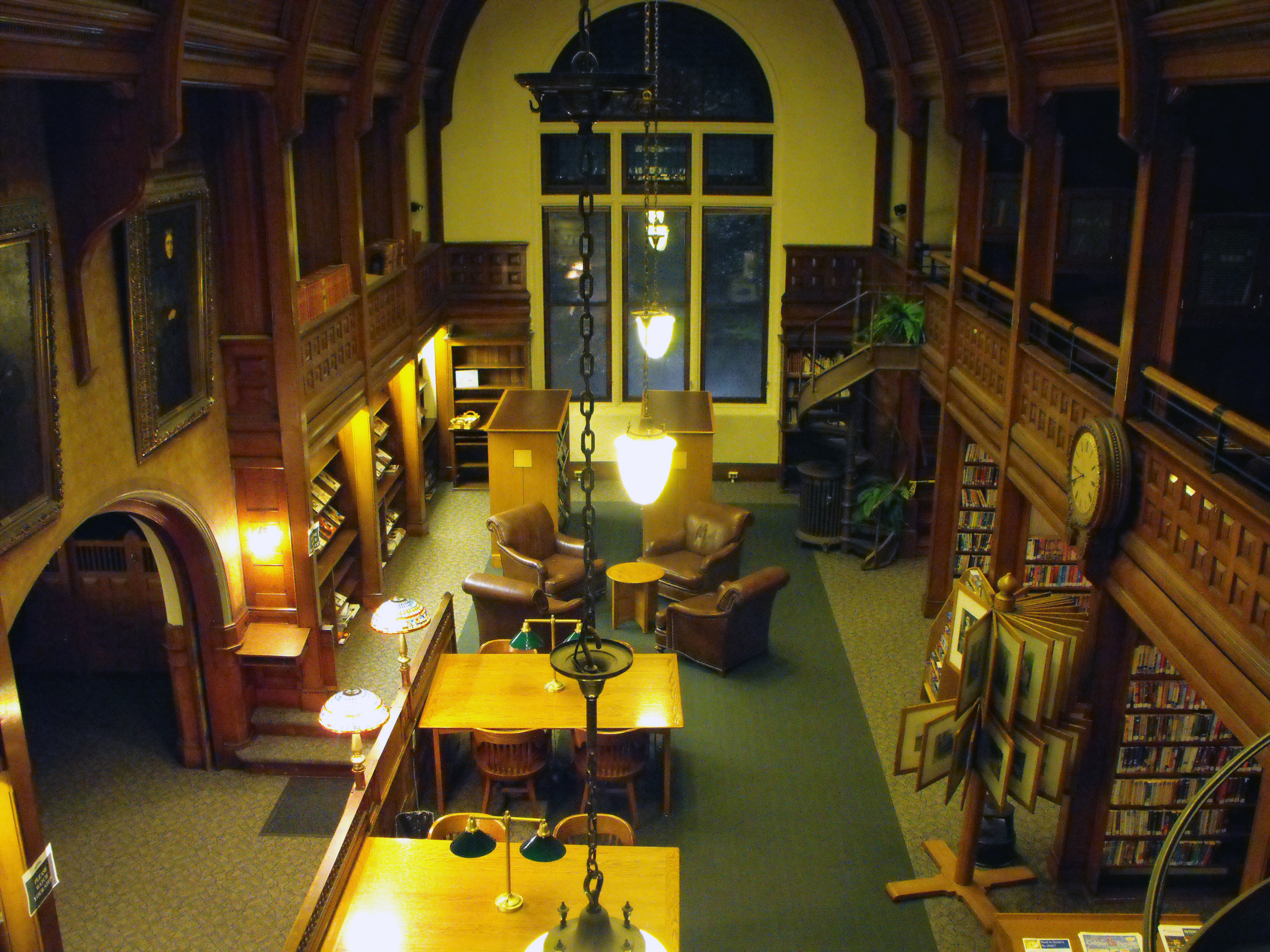
Present day interior of the original room

== See also ==
- National Register of Historic Places listings in Methuen, Massachusetts
- National Register of Historic Places listings in Essex County, Massachusetts
