= Methuen, Massachusetts =

- City
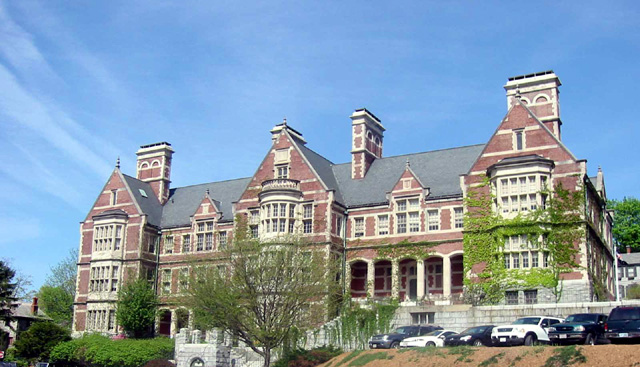
- Methuen City Hall

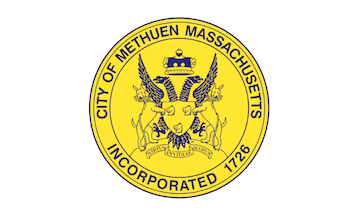
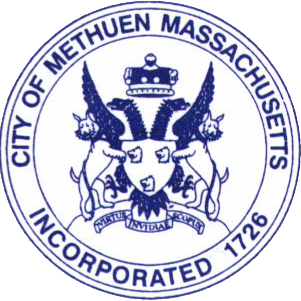
- Flag Seal

- Location in Essex County and the state of Massachusetts.

- Location in the United States
- Coordinates: 42°43′34″N 71°11′29″W
- Country: United States
- State: Massachusetts
- County: Essex
- Settled: 1642
- Incorporated: December 8, 1725
- Incorporated a city: 1917
- Named for: Sir Paul Methuen

Government
  - Type: Mayor-council
  - Mayor: David Beauregard Jr.

Area
  - Total: 22.99 sq mi (59.55 km^{2})
  - Land: 22.21 sq mi (57.53 km^{2})
  - Water: 0.78 sq mi (2.02 km^{2})
- Elevation: 115 ft (35 m)

Population (2020)
  - Total: 53,059
  - Density: 2,388.7/sq mi (922.29/km^{2})
- Time zone: UTC−5 (Eastern)
  - Summer (DST): UTC−4 (Eastern)
- ZIP Code: 01844
- Area code: 351/978
- FIPS code: 25-40710
- GNIS feature ID: 0612337
- Website: www.cityofmethuen.net

Methuen (/məˈθuːən/) is a 23-square-mile (60 km^{2}) city in Essex County, Massachusetts, United States. The population was 53,059 at the 2020 census. Methuen lies along the northwestern edge of Essex County, just east of Middlesex County and just south of Rockingham County, New Hampshire. The city is bordered by Haverhill to the northeast, North Andover to the southeast, Lawrence and Andover to the south, Dracut (Middlesex County) to the west, Pelham, New Hampshire (Hillsborough County) to the northwest, and Salem, New Hampshire (Rockingham County) to the north. Methuen is located 17 miles (27 km) southwest from Newburyport, 30 miles (48 km) north-northwest of Boston and 25 miles (40 km) south-southeast of Manchester, New Hampshire. The city is a part of the Merrimack Valley and its ZIP Code is 01844.

== History ==
Methuen was first settled in 1642 and was officially incorporated in 1726. Methuen was originally part of Haverhill, Massachusetts. In 1724 Stephen Barker and others in the western part of that town petitioned the General Court to grant them permission to form a new town above Hawke's Meadow Brook. Although opposed by their fellow townsmen, the petition was approved the following year (December 8, 1725), and the General Court gave them an act of incorporation under the name of Methuen. The town was named for Sir Paul Methuen, a member of the King's Privy Council and friend of acting Provincial Governor William Dummer. The first town meeting was held on March 9, 1726, in the home of a resident. The land was set aside for a meetinghouse, which was erected later in 1726 on what is now Meetinghouse Hill Cemetery.

The residents in the northern part of the new town of Methuen soon petitioned to have their own meetinghouse (a combination of town hall and puritan church), and in 1736 the north parish was set off. Land for a meetinghouse was donated by descendants of the original proprietors of Haverhill, and in 1738 the second Methuen meetinghouse was raised. The structure survives to this day, as the Salem N.H. Historical Society building. In 1741, with the fixing of the Northern boundary of Massachusetts, most of this new north parish was removed from Methuen and placed in New Hampshire. It was incorporated as Salem, New Hampshire in 1750.

Industrial growth in the 1800s influenced Methuen's development. Construction of the Methuen Cotton Mills at the Spicket River falls in the 1820s and the increased manufacture of hats and shoes in small factories along the Spicket spurred the centralization of Methuen's economic, residential and cultural activities within the area around Osgood, Broadway, Hampshire and Pleasant streets. Three wealthy and prominent families—the Nevins, the Tenneys and the Searles—played a significant role in Methuen's history and development. These families were instrumental in the founding of many of Methuen's landmarks, including the Nevins Memorial Library, the Searles building, Tenney Gatehouse, Nevins Home, Spicket Falls, and the Civil War monument between Pleasant and Charles streets.

In 1922, it was affected by the 1922 New England Textile Strike, shutting down the mills in the city over an attempted wage cut.

== Geography ==
Methuen is located at 42°43′48″N 71°10′46″W (42.730040, −71.179352). According to the United States Census Bureau, the city has a total area of 23.1 square miles (59.7 km^{2}), of which 22.2 square miles (57.6 km^{2}) is land and 0.77 square miles (2.0 km^{2}), or 3.42%, is water.

Methuen lies alongside the northern banks of the Merrimack River and is bisected by the Spicket (originally "Spigot") River, as well as many brooks and streams. There are several ponds dotting the area as well, and the town is home to a town forest, a bird sanctuary, and a small state park (Tenney State Park). Pine Island, near the southern end of town in the Merrimack River, is also part of the town's land.

== Transportation ==
Methuen lies at the northern end of Interstate 93 in Massachusetts, with three exits providing access. A portion of Interstate 495 crosses through the eastern side of town from Lawrence to Haverhill. Massachusetts Route 213, the "Loop Connector", provides highway access between the two, having three intermediate exits of its own, in addition to the exits for I-93 and I-495. The town is also crossed by Route 28, Route 110, and Route 113, the latter two meeting at I-93 Exit 43 (old exit 46). I-93 provides the town's only bridge across the Merrimack; there are several crossings in Lawrence, and several in neighboring Haverhill, but none for 7 miles (11 km) upstream from I-93 all the way to the eastern end of Lowell and also comes down from New Hampshire, providing the fastest route to both 25 minutes north to Manchester, New Hampshire, and 25–30 minutes south to Boston.

Methuen is served by the Merrimack Valley Regional Transit Authority's bus service. Daily intercity bus service to Worcester and New York City is provided by OurBus from the Methuen Park and Ride. The nearest MBTA Commuter Rail stations are Lawrence, Bradford and Haverhill, all part of the Haverhill/Reading Line, providing service into Boston's North Station. Small plane service can be found at Lawrence Municipal Airport and the Merrimack Valley Seaplane Base, with the nearest national service being at Manchester-Boston Regional Airport, and the nearest international service being at Boston's Logan International Airport.

== Demographics ==
Historical population
Year	Pop.	±%
1790	1,297	—
1800	1,253	−3.4%
1810	1,181	−5.7%
1820	1,371	+16.1%
1830	2,006	+46.3%
1840	2,251	+12.2%
1850	2,538	+12.7%
1860	2,566	+1.1%
1870	2,959	+15.3%
1880	4,392	+48.4%
1890	4,814	+9.6%
1900	7,512	+56.0%
1910	11,448	+52.4%
1920	15,189	+32.7%
1930	21,069	+38.7%
1940	21,880	+3.8%
1950	24,477	+11.9%
1960	28,114	+14.9%
1970	35,456	+26.1%
1980	36,701	+3.5%
1990	39,990	+9.0%
2000	43,789	+9.5%
2010	47,255	+7.9%
2020	53,059	+12.3%
2024*	54,272	+2.3%
* = population estimate. Source: United States census records and Population Estimates Program data. Source: U.S. Decennial Census

As of the census of 2000, there were 43,789 people, 16,532 households, and 11,539 families residing in the city. The population density was 1,954.7 persons per square mile (754.8/km^{2}). There were 16,885 housing units, at an average density of 753.7 per square mile (291.0/km^{2}). The racial makeup of the city was 89.35% White, 1.35% African American, 0.22% Native American, 2.38% Asian, 0.01% Pacific Islander, 4.87% from other races, and 1.82% from two or more races. Hispanics and Latinos, of any race, were 9.64% of the population (8.4% Dominican, 5.7% Puerto Rican, 0.6% Guatemalan, 0.3% Ecuadorian, 0.3% Mexican, 0.3% Cuban). Methuen has a very diverse population and it has gotten more diverse over the years. For a very long time, Methuen and its neighboring city, Lawrence have always been, and still are home to a large number of Lebanese, French, and Italian communities. Methuen is also a major Hispanic/Latino community, including Dominicans.

There were 16,532 households, of which 33.1% had children under the age of 18 living with them, 53.3% were married couples living together, 12.2% had a female householder with no husband present, and 30.2% were non-families. Of all households, 25.3% were made up of individuals, and 11.6% had someone living alone who was 65 years of age or older. The average household size was 2.62 and the average family size was 3.17.

In the city, the population was spread out, with 24.7% under the age of 18, 7.3% from 18 to 24, 31.0% from 25 to 44, 21.6% from 45 to 64, and 15.3% who were 65 years of age or older. The median age was 38 years. For every 100 females, there were 91.9 males. For every 100 females age 18 and over, there were 87.0 males.

The median income for a household in the city was $49,627, and the median income for a family was $59,831. Males had a median income of $41,693 versus $31,864 for females. The per capita income for the city was $22,305. About 5.8% of families and 7.4% of the population were below the poverty line, including 9.7% of those under age 18 and 7.7% of those aged 65 or over.

== Government ==
Historically, Methuen had a town meeting-selectmen form of government and was known as the Town of Methuen until it adopted a charter replacing its traditional town meeting and selectmen with a council and manager. Even with a form of government that had historically and legally been exclusive to cities, the community, in a gesture of traditionalism, retained the name Town of Methuen in its charter. However, because Massachusetts cities have self-governing powers not available to towns, it became known for legal purposes as "The City Known as the Town of Methuen". A subsequent charter, which adopted a strong mayor form of government, officially changed the community name to the "City of Methuen".

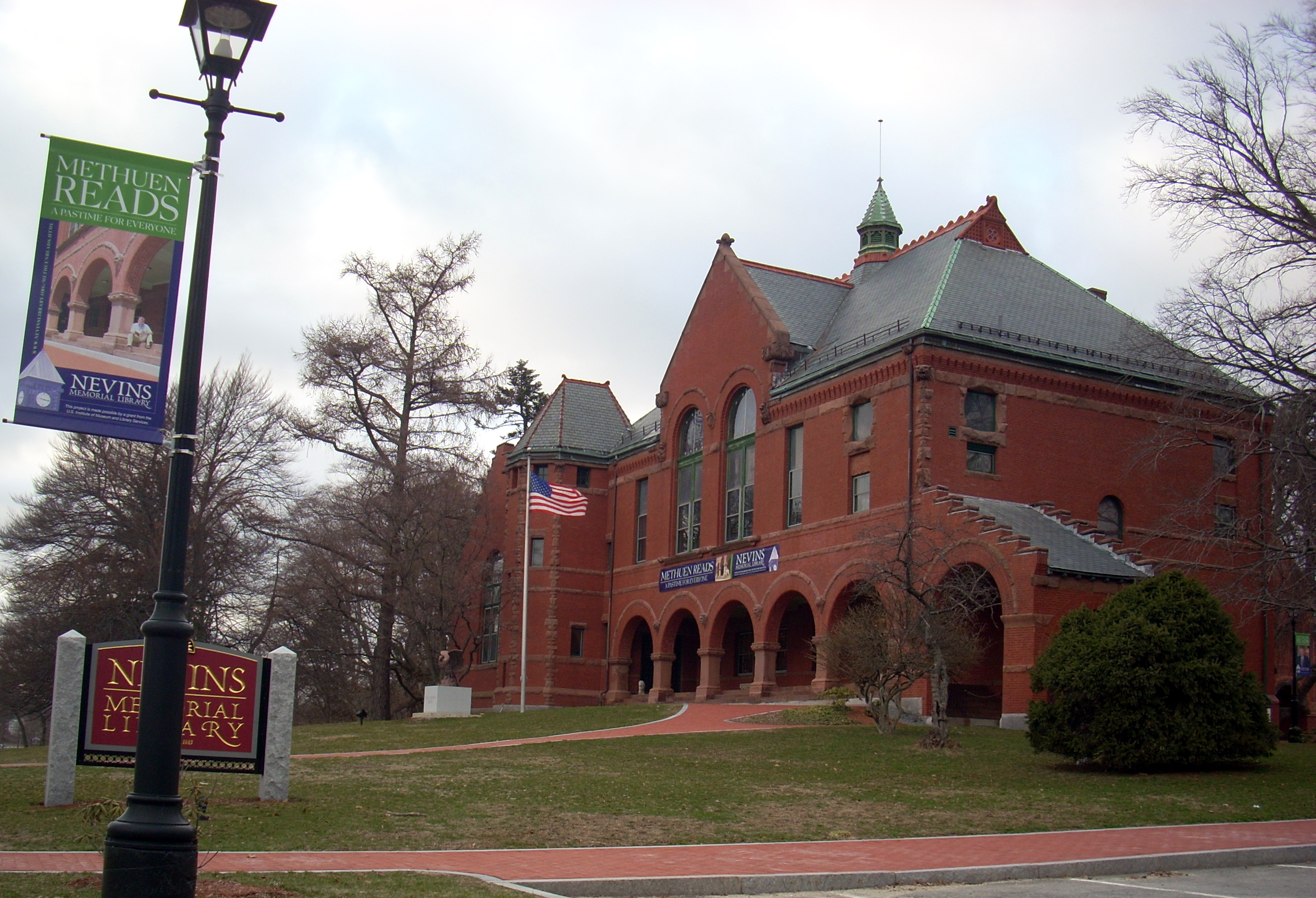
Nevins Memorial Library

Methuen's city government consists of a mayor, three Councilors-at-Large, two East District councilors, two Central District councilors, two West District councilors, and six School Committee members. The following are the current members of Methuen's municipal government:

- The Mayor of Methuen is David “DJ” Beauregard, Jr.
- The at-large city councilors are John R. Drew, Ryan R. Dizoglio and Jana Zanni Pesce.
- The East District city councilors are Ronald Marsan and Neily Soto.
- The Central District city councilors are Ella McClaren and Yanilda Santos.
- The West District city councilors are Michael Simard and Patricia Valley.

Methuen is part of the Massachusetts Senate's 1st Essex district.

Methuen presidential election results
Year	Democratic	Republican	Third parties	Total Votes	Margin
2020	55.28% 14,328	42.93% 11,127	1.79% 464	25,919	12.35%
2016	50.81% 11,662	44.60% 10,235	4.59% 1,054	22,951	6.22%
2012	51.42% 11,092	47.27% 10,198	1.31% 282	21,572	4.14%
2008	53.75% 11,263	44.39% 9,303	1.86% 390	20,956	9.35%
2004	52.04% 10,037	47.05% 9,075	0.91% 175	19,287	4.99%
2000	54.49% 9,465	38.87% 6,751	6.64% 1,153	17,369	15.63%
1996	56.06% 9,450	31.72% 5,347	12.23% 2,061	16,858	24.34%
1992	39.45% 7,727	35.50% 6,954	25.04% 4,905	19,586	3.95%
1988	42.42% 7,765	55.90% 10,233	1.68% 308	18,306	13.48%
1984	42.34% 7,323	57.25% 9,901	0.40% 70	17,294	14.91%
1980	42.23% 7,358	45.62% 7,950	12.15% 2,117	17,425	3.40%
1976	64.97% 11,476	32.65% 5,767	2.38% 420	17,663	32.32%
1972	53.46% 9,184	45.78% 7,864	0.76% 131	17,179	7.68%
1968	62.63% 9,891	33.56% 5,300	3.81% 602	15,793	29.07%
1964	72.86% 11,232	26.63% 4,106	0.51% 78	15,416	46.22%
1960	59.44% 8,872	40.37% 6,025	0.19% 29	14,926	19.07%
1956	38.97% 5,384	60.79% 8,399	0.24% 33	13,816	21.82%
1952	41.58% 5,565	58.01% 7,764	0.41% 55	13,384	16.43%
1948	54.92% 6,206	42.73% 4,828	2.35% 266	11,300	12.19%
1944	51.26% 5,264	48.52% 4,983	0.21% 22	10,269	2.74%
1940	54.57% 5,902	44.77% 4,842	0.66% 71	10,815	9.80%

Voter Registration and Party Enrollment as of October 17, 2018
Party	Number of Voters	Percentage
Republican	4,031	11.56%
Democratic	11,322	32.46%
Unaffiliated	19,012	54.51%
Libertarian	124	0.36%
Total	34,881	100%

== Education ==
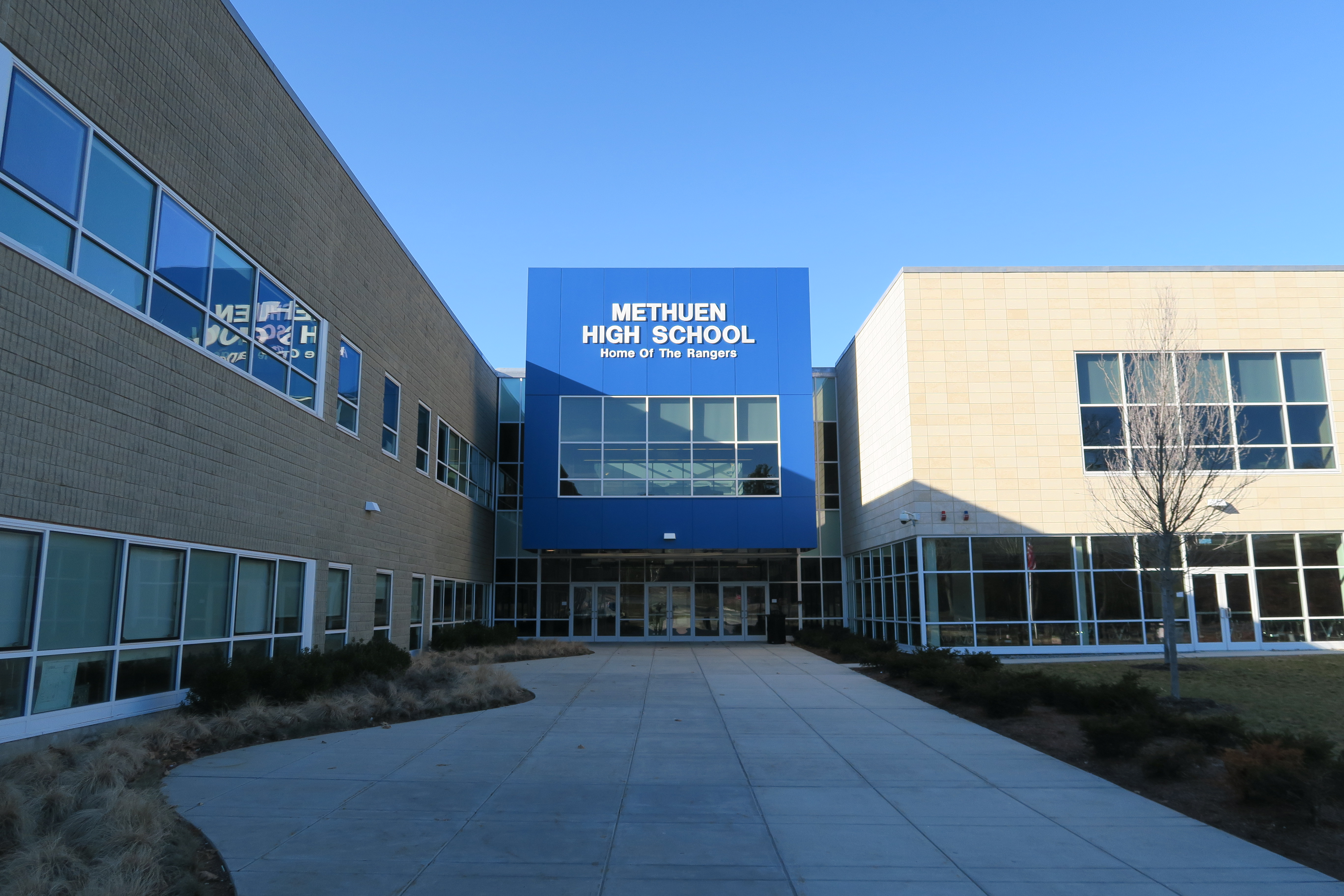
Methuen High School

=== Public schools ===
- Methuen High School
- Comprehensive Grammar School
- Tenney Grammar School
- Timony Grammar School
- Marsh Grammar School

=== Private schools ===
- Saint Monica's is a Catholic for pre-K to 8th grade.
- St. Ann's Home and School provides residential, outpatient, and private day school options for a wide range of learning disabilities and/or behavioral and emotional disorders. All programs are designed to provide a continuum of special needs services to assist children and adolescents who need intensive and comprehensive help for themselves and their families. The Day School program offers education for children and adolescents with special emotional needs, complemented by a strong therapeutic component. Children are transported to St. Ann's from communities in a one-hour radius. Referrals come from school districts seeking an academically focused, clinically supported school setting for students with significant emotional, developmental, behavioral, and learning needs.
- Presentation of Mary Academy was a private Catholic high school founded in 1958. The academy is on a 22-acre (8.9 ha) campus formerly known as the Edward F. Searles Estate. The school was originally for young women in grades 9–12 but went co-educational with the 2011–2012 school year. Due to financial difficulties, the school closed in 2020.

=== Sports ===
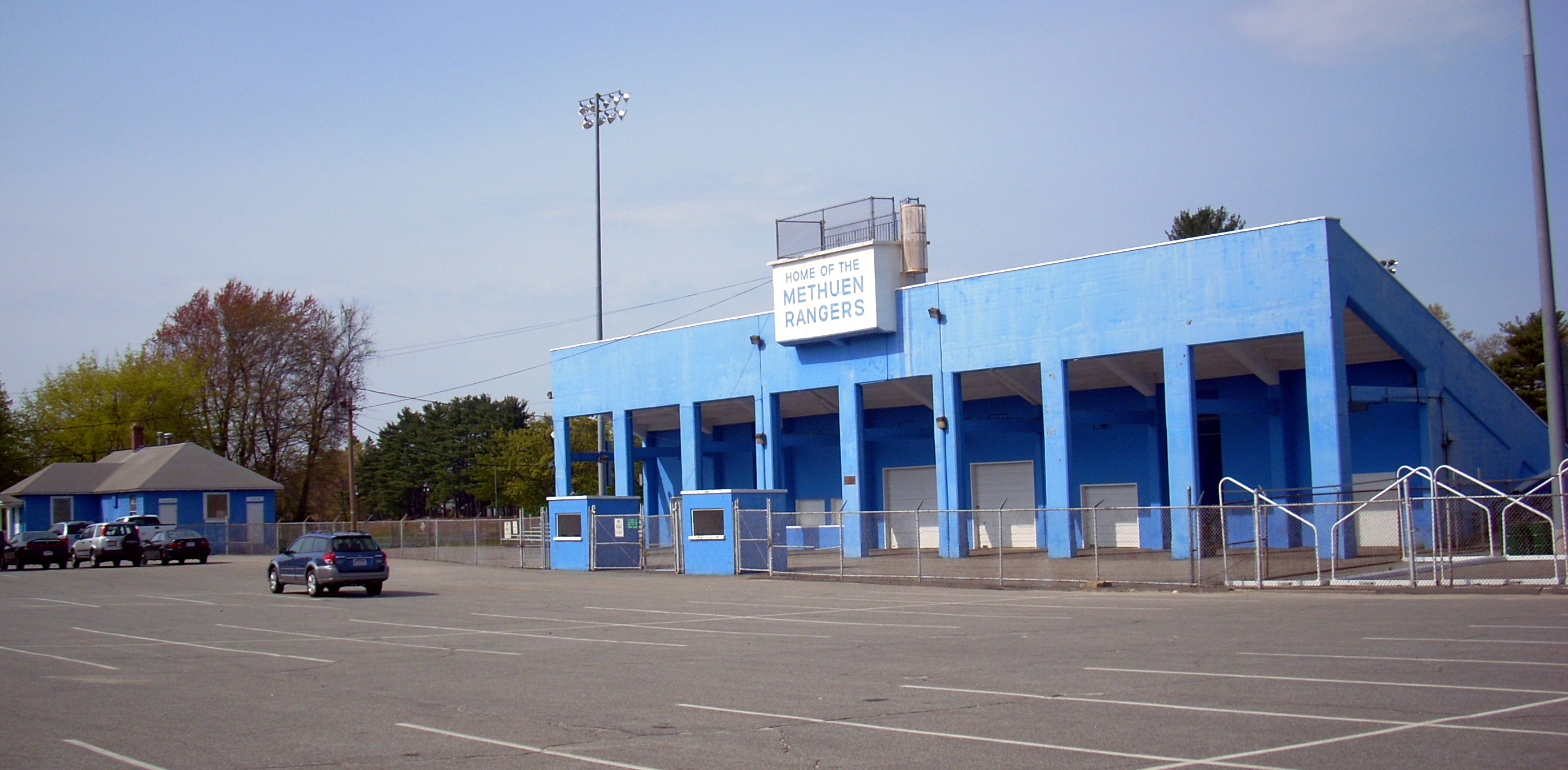
Nicholson Stadium, home of the Methuen Rangers

Methuen High School's athletic teams play in the Merrimack Valley Conference. Their big rivals are the Andover Golden Warriors, the Central Catholic Raiders of Lawrence, and the Haverhill Hillies. On Thanksgiving Day, the football team plays fellow Merrimack Valley foe the Dracut Middies. The teams first met in a non-Thanksgiving Day game in 1935 and did not play again until the Thanksgiving series started in 1963. The school colors are blue and white, and their mascot is the Ranger, named after Rogers' Rangers, the precursor of the U.S. Army Rangers, which was founded by town resident Robert Rogers.

== Historic district ==
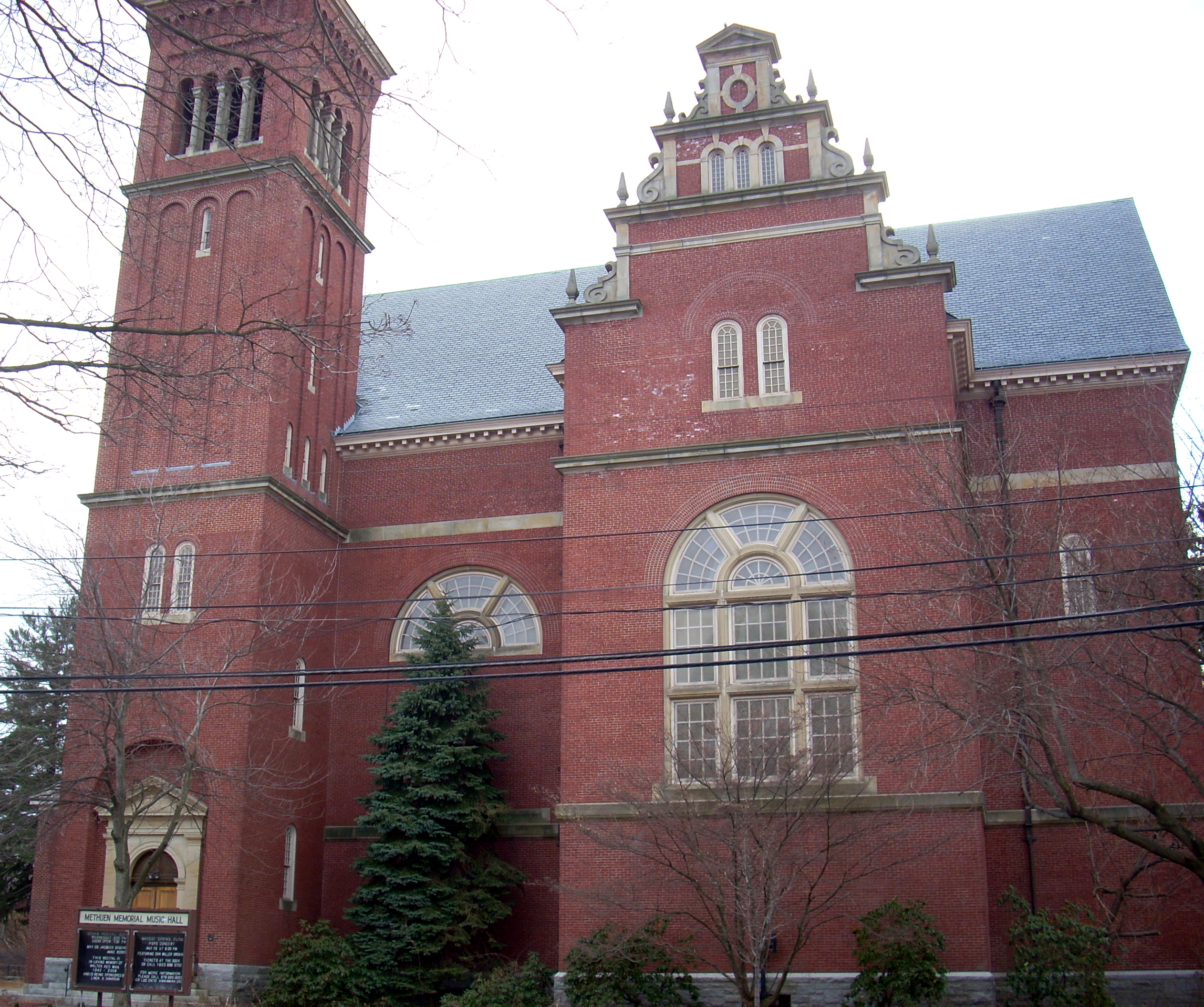
Methuen Memorial Music Hall

The Searles Tenney Nevins Historic District, established by the city in 1992 to preserve the "distinctive architecture and rich character of one of Massachusetts' most unique neighborhoods", is named after the three Methuen city fathers: David C. Nevins, Edward F. Searles and Charles H. Tenney.

From the City of Methuen:

Today, the trio's collective vision can be seen in mills, housing, schools, mansions, churches, monuments, playgrounds, the library, and the architectural fantasies that resulted from their artistic rivalry. The historic district boundaries were established to include properties and buildings constructed or used by the Searles, Tenney and Nevins families and the people who worked for them.

The historic district is administered by the Methuen Historic District Commission, which protects the district from alterations that might compromise its historic integrity. Property owners within the historic district must obey the Rules and Regulations of the Historic District Commission. The rules and regulations specify general criteria for materials used, size and proportions of the buildings, colors, as well as other features. Any violation of the rules and regulations can result in fines and other possible legal action.

Bounded within the Searles Tenney Nevins Historic District are the Spicket Falls Historic District and the Pleasant-High Historic District. Both are listed on the National Register of Historic Places, as are many of the other buildings within the area.

== Points of interest ==
- Forest Lake is a recreational great pond of over 55 acres (22 ha) bordered by the Methuen town forest. Access is managed by the Forest Lake Association. Residents and visitors can engage in a series of activities, including fishing, canoeing, and swimming.
- Methuen Water Works, Cross Street, is listed on the National Register of Historic Places
- Methuen Memorial Music Hall was built specifically to house the Great Organ, built originally by Walcker Orgelbau for the Boston Music Hall, and procured by philanthropist and city benefactor Edward Francis Searles more than a century ago. The organ case, which in approximate terms is as large as a typical house, is ornate and features a bust of J.S. Bach as a central ornament.
- The Methuen Rail Trail occupies the railbanked Boston and Maine Manchester and Lawrence Railroad corridor. It connects the Spicket River Greenway in Lawrence with the in-development Salem Bike-Ped Corridor. Future plans to revitalize this rail line for commuter and freight rail could make this trail a rail-with-trail bike path.
- National Register of Historic Places listings in Methuen, Massachusetts
- The Nevins Memorial Library, founded in 1868 by David Nevins, Sr., was completed in 1883, two years after his death. The grand brick and stained glass library were listed on the National Register of Historic Places in 1984.
- Saint Basil's Seminary is the main US location for the Basilian Salvatorian Order, a community of religious priests of the Greek Catholic rite.
- St Xenia Orthodox Church, a multi-ethnic and multi-cultural parish of Russian Orthodox Church Outside Russia (ROCOR). The church hosts St. John of Damascus Church School.

== Notable people ==
- Steve Bedrosian, professional baseball pitcher, chiefly for the Atlanta Braves
- Joseph Bodwell, 40th governor of Maine
- Mark Buben, professional football player
- Susie Castillo, Miss Massachusetts USA 2003, Miss USA 2003 and MTV VJ
- Elias James Corey, 1990 Nobel Prize in Chemistry laureate
- Ben Cosgrove, composer and multi-instrumentalist
- Pat DeCola, sports reporter
- Sean Furey, Olympic javelin thrower
- Mitchell Garabedian, attorney
- Andrew Haldane (1917–1944), Marine captain, portrayed in the HBO miniseries The Pacific
- Christopher Lennertz, composer for films, television shows, and video games
- Warren Manzi (1955–2016), playwright, Perfect Crime
- Gary McLain former Villanova men's basketball player
- Harriet Nevins, philanthropist, animal rights activist
- Georges Niang, professional NBA player for the Boston Celtics
- Fred Otash, actor, author, famous private investigator, LA police officer, WWII Marine veteran
- Jimmy Pedro, Olympics bronze medalist
- Mary Frances Platt (1953–2004), writer and activist
- Edith Prague, Connecticut politician
- Mike Rochford, former pitcher for the Boston Red Sox
- Robert Rogers (1731–1795), founder of Rogers' Rangers which led to the creation of the United States Army Rangers
- John Ruiz, professional boxer, born in Methuen
- Edward Francis Searles (1841–1920), philanthropist, interior and architectural designer
- James Michael Shannon, Massachusetts Attorney General and congressman
- Charles H. Tenney (1842–1919), industrialist and philanthropist

== See also ==
- List of mill towns in Massachusetts
