= Barnabas (disambiguation) =

Saint Barnabas was an early Christian mentioned in the New Testament.

Barnabas may also refer to:

- Barnabas (name), a masculine given name or a surname, including a list of people and fictional characters with the name
  - Barnabás, a Hungarian masculine given name
- Barnabas (band), a Christian rock band
- Epistle of Barnabas, of the New Testament apocrypha
- Gospel of Barnabas, of the New Testament apocrypha
- Acts of Barnabas, of the New Testament apocrypha
- Barnabas (EP), a 2021 EP by Kizz Daniel

== See also ==
- Saint Barnabas (disambiguation)
- Barnabus (disambiguation)
- Barnaba (disambiguation)
- Barnaby (disambiguation)
- Barnabas Fund, an international Christian aid agency
- House of St Barnabas, a historic building and charity in London, England
- Varnavas (Greek: Βαρνάβας 'Barnabas'), a town in Greece
