= St. Barnabas' Church =

The following churches or similar establishments are named after Saint Barnabas:

== Australia ==
- St Barnabas Anglican Church, Broadway, Sydney, Australia
- St Barnabas Anglican Church, Yarramalong, New South Wales
- St Barnabas Church and Cemetery, South Arm, Tasmania

== Canada ==
- St. Barnabas Anglican Church, Allanwater Bridge station
- St. Barnabas, Apostle and Martyr Anglican Church, Ottawa

== Ireland ==
- St. Barnabas' Church, Dublin

== Namibia ==
- St Barnabas, Windhoek

== New Zealand ==
- St Barnabas Anglican Church, Auckland
- St Barnabas Church, Christchurch
- St Barnabas Church, Roseneath
- St Barnabas Church, Warrington
- St Barnabas Church, Wellington

== Solomon Islands ==
- Cathedral Church of St Barnabas, Honiara

== United Kingdom ==
- St Barnabas' Church, Balsall Heath, Birmingham
- St Barnabas' Church, Birmingham
- St Barnabas' Church, Bradwell
- St Barnabas' Church, Bromborough
- St Barnabas' Church, Chester
- St Barnabas' Church, Crewe
- St Barnabas' Church, Darwen
- St Barnabas' Church, Derby
- St Barnabas' Church, Erdington
- St Barnabas Church, Gloucester
- St Barnabas Church, Hove
- St Barnabas Church, Inham Nook
- St Barnabas Bethnal Green, London
- St Barnabas' Church, Dulwich, London
- St Barnabas' Church, Manor Park, London
- St Barnabas' Church, Mitcham, London
- Church of St Barnabas, Pimlico, London
- St Barnabas' Church, West Silvertown, London
- St Barnabas Greek Orthodox Church, Wood Green, London
- St Barnabas' Church, Woodford Green, London
- St Barnabas' Church, Morecambe
- St Barnabas' Church, Mossley Hill
- St Barnabas' Church, Lenton Abbey, Nottingham
- Nottingham Cathedral, the Cathedral Church of St. Barnabas, Nottingham
- St Barnabas Church, Oxford
- Church of St Barnabas, Queen Camel
- St Barnabas Church, Ranmore
- Church of Saint Barnabas, Swanmore

== United States ==
- St. Barnabas Episcopal Church (Foreman, Arkansas)
- Saint Barnabas on the Desert, in Paradise Valley, Arizona
- St. Barnabas Episcopal Church (Montrose, Iowa)
- St. Barnabas' Episcopal Church, Leeland, Maryland
- St. Barnabas' Episcopal Church (Newark, New Jersey)
- St. Barnabas' Church (Bronx), New York
- Church of St. Barnabas (Irvington, New York)
- St. Barnabas Episcopal Church (Troy, New York)
- St. Barnabas Episcopal Church (Snow Hill, North Carolina)

== See also ==
- Saint Barnabas (disambiguation)
