= Barnaby =

Barnaby is an Old English surname composed of the Saxon element beorn meaning young warrior, and the Danish suffix by meaning 'settlement'. As a given name, it means "son of consolation" and is etymologically linked with the New Testament name Barnabas.

== People ==
=== Given name ===
- Barnaby Conrad (1922–2013), American writer and artist
- Barnaby Conrad III (born 1952), American writer, editor, and artist
- Barns Courtney (born 1990), English singer
- Barnaby Diddleum, pseudonym used by P.T. Barnum (1810–1891)
- Barnaby Dorfman, founder and CEO of Foodista.com
- Barnaby Edwards, British actor, writer, director and artist
- Barnaby Evans, American artist
- Barnaby Fitzpatrick, 1st Baron Upper Ossory
- Barnaby French (born 1975), Australian rules footballer
- Barnaby Furnas (born 1973), American painter
- Barnaby Harwood (born 1979), English actor
- Barnaby Jack (1977–2013), New Zealand computer security professional
- Barnaby Joyce (born 1967), Australian politician
- Barnaby Keeney (1914–1980), president of Brown University
- Barnaby Bernard Lintot, (1675–1736), English publisher
- Barnaby Metschurat (born 1974), German actor
- Barnaby Miln (born 1947), gay magistrate and social activist
- Barnaby Potter (1577–1642), Church of England priest
- Barnaby Raine (born 1995), English historian
- Barnaby Ralph (born 1969), professional virtuoso recorder player
- Barnaby Weir, singer, songwriter and guitarist

=== Surname ===
- Frank Barnaby, anti-nuclear weapons activist
- George Barnaby, Canadian politician
- Hannah Barnaby, author of Wonder Show
- Matthew Barnaby (born 1973), retired National Hockey League right winger
- Nathaniel Barnaby (1829–1915), English engineer
- Thomas Barnaby (1841–1907), Micmac chief

== Fictional characters ==
- Barnaby, a character created and portrayed by children's television personality Linn Sheldon (1919–2006), in Barnaby & Me (1956–1990, Cleveland, Ohio)
- Barnaby, vampire in the Anita Blake: Vampire Hunter series of erotic fantasy-horror novels by Laurell K. Hamilton
- Barnaby, merman character played by Scott Michaelson in Sabrina, Down Under (1999)
- "Barnaby Bear", the English name given to Colargol, the 1970s Franco-Polish children's character when the show was broadcast by the BBC
- "Barnaby Bear", the English name for Rasmus Klump, a Danish comic strip
- a title character of Becky and Barnaby Bear, a BBC CBeebies television series
- Barnaby Brooks Jr., one of the main protagonist in the Japanese anime Tiger & Bunny (2011)
- Dr. Barnaby Fulton, a main character in the film Monkey Business (1952), played by Cary Grant
- Barnaby Elf, a side character and one of Ben Elf and Princess Holly's Elf friends in the British cartoon ""Ben and Holly's Little Kingdom"".
- Barnaby Gaitlin, narrator of A Patchwork Planet (1998) by Anne Tyler
- the title character of Barnaby Grimes, series of children's books by Paul Stewart and Chris Riddell
- the title character of Barnaby Jones, television detective series (1973–1980), played by Buddy Ebsen
- Barnaby Littlemouse, character created by English children's writer and illustrator Racey Helps (1913–1970)
- Barnaby Pierce, in the television movie Coast to Coast (2003), played by Richard Dreyfuss
- Barnaby Ross, pseudonym used by creators of Ellery Queen
- the title character of Charles Dickens' novel Barnaby Rudge
- Barnaby Tucker, character in Hello, Dolly! (1969)
- Barnaby Tucker, character in the play The Matchmaker by Thornton Wilder
- Barnaby West, character on Wagon Train, played by Michael Burns
- the title character of Sir Barnaby Whig, a Restoration comedy play by Sir Thomas d'Urfey
- Cousin Barnaby, in the Meadowsweet, by Baroness Emma Orczy (1865–1947)
- the protagonist of the Widow Barnaby trilogy of novels by Frances Trollope
- the title character of Drunken Barnaby's Four Journeys to the North of England, poems by Richard Braithwaite (1588–1673)
- the protagonist of the Alexandra Barnaby series of novels by Janet Evanovich (born 1943)
- Dr. Russell Barnaby, evil geneticist in Dead Rising, a 2006 video game
- Silas Barnaby, in the 1934 film version of Babes in Toyland
- Tom Barnaby, a detective in the novels and British television series Midsomer Murders
- Uncle Barnaby, character in the 1903 operetta Babes in Toyland
- Barnaby, a strongman who appears occasionally on the Family Guy animated television series
- Barnaby (comics), a comic strip by Crockett Johnson starring Barnaby Baxter
- Barnaby (comics Tintin), in The Adventures of Tintin by Hergé
- Barnaby, a physician in the video game Hollow Knight: Silksong

== See also ==
- Barnby (disambiguation)
