= Barnabas (name) =

Barnabas is both a masculine given name and a surname. As a given name, it is a New Testament name which means "son of the prophet". Variants of the name include Barnaba, Barnaby, and Barnabás, a Hungarian masculine given name.

== People ==
- Barnabas, born Joseph, first-century AD Christian disciple
- Andrew Barnabas, video game music composer
- John Barnabas (1929–1994), Indian evolutionary biologist
- Levi Barnabas (born 1964), Canadian politician
- Mathews Barnabas (1924–2012), Malankara Metropolitan
- Yetunde Barnabas (born 1990), Nigerian model and actress
- Vicent Barnabas (born 1985), Tanzanian footballer
- Yusuf Barnabas Bala (1956–2021), Nigerian politician and architect
- Barnabas Bidwell (1763–1833), American author, teacher, and politician
- Barnabas Brough (c. 1795–1854), British merchant and accountant
- Robert Barnabas Brough (1828–1860), English writer
- Barnabas Burns (1817–1883), American lawyer, businessman, and politician
- Barnabas Daru (fl. 2000s–2020s), Nigerian-American plant ecologist and biogeographer
- Barnabas Sibusiso Dlamini (1942–2018), Prime Minister of Eswatini
- Sibusiso Dlamini (born 1980), Swazi footballer
- Barnabas Eldridge (1843–1911), American industrialist
- Barnabas Fung (born 1960), Hong Kong judge
- Barnabas Andyar Gemade (born 1948), Nigerian politician
- Barnabas Geevarghese, Metropolitan
- Barnabas Gooch (died c. 1926), English lawyer and academic
- Barnabas Gunn (c. 1680–1753), English organist and composer
- Barnabas R. Halem 'Imana (1929–2016), Ugandan priest
- Barney Hopkinson (born 1939), Anglican priest
- Barnabas Imenger (1975–2021), Nigerian footballer
- Barnabas Imenger (born 1991), Nigerian footballer, son of the footballer born 1975
- Barnabas Kelet Henagan (1798–1855), physician and governor of South Carolina
- Barnabas Kinyor (born 1961), Kenyan athlete
- Bart Latuheru (born 1965), Dutch footballer
- Barnabas Long (fl. 1683–1865), Archdeacon of Cleveland
- Barnabas Lindars (1923–1991), English scholar
- Barnabas McDonald (1865–1929), Brother of the Christian Schools
- Barnabas Muturi Mwangi, Kenyan politician
- Barnabas Nawangwe (born 1956), Ugandan architect and academic
- Barnabas O'Brien (died 1657), 6th Earl of Thomond
- Barnabas Oley (1602–1686), English churchman and academic
- Barnabas Root, (died 1877), Sierra Leonean reverend
- Barnabas A. Samatta (born 1940), Tanzanian lawyer
- Barnabas Scudamore (1609–1651), English soldier
- Barnabas Suebu (born 1946), Indonesian governor of province Papua
- Barney White-Spunner (born 1957), British Army officer
- Barnabas Wood (1819–1875), American dentist and inventor
- Barnabas Zhang (1882–1961), Chinese churchman

== Fictional characters ==
- Barnabas Burnaby, protagonist in the musical comedy Hullo Healo
- Barnabas Collins, vampire in the soap opera Dark Shadows
- Barnabas Tharmr, a major antagonist from the 2023 video game Final Fantasy XVI
- Barnabas, a rabbit from the movie Peter Rabbit 2, who tricks the protagonist into stealing food for him

== See also ==
- Barnabus (disambiguation)
- Barry (name)
