= Barnabás =

- Gender: Male
- Name day: 11 June November

Origin
- Origin: St. Barnabas
- Meaning: Son of consolation
- Region of origin: Hungary

Other names
- Related names: Barnabas

Barnabás is a Hungarian masculine given name. It is a New Testament name which means "son of consolation" and was the name of St. Barnabas, an early Christian, one of the prominent Christian disciples in Jerusalem. People bearing the name Barnabás include:

- Barnabás Berzsenyi, (1918–1993), Hungarian fencer
- Barnabás Bese (born 1994), Hungarian footballer
- Barnabás Bíró (born 2005), Hungarian footballer
- Barnabás von Géczy (1897–1971), Hungarian violinist, composer, and bandleader
- Barnabás Hegyi (1914–1966), Hungarian cinematographer
- Barnabás Kelemen (born 1978), Hungarian violinist
- Barnabás Peák (born 1998), Hungarian cyclist
- Barnabás Rácz (born 1996), Hungarian footballer
- Barnabás Steinmetz (born 1975), Hungarian water polo player
- Barnabás Sztipánovics (born 1974), Hungarian footballer
- Barnabás Tamás (born 1952), Hungarian politician
- Barnabás Tornyi (born 1953), Hungarian football manager
- Barnabás Tóth (born 1994), Hungarian footballer
- Barnabás Varga (born 1994), Hungarian footballer
- Barnabás Vári (born 1987), Hungarian footballer

== See also ==
- Barnabus (disambiguation)
