= Saint Barnabas (disambiguation) =

Saint Barnabas was an early Christian mentioned in the New Testament.

Saint Barnabas may also refer to:

- Barnabas the New Confessor (1914–1964), Serbian Orthodox bishop of America and Canada
- St. Barnabas' Church, the name of several churches
- St Barnabas College, the name of several colleges
- St Barnabas Hospital (disambiguation)
- Saint Barnabas Medical Center, in Livingston, New Jersey, U.S.
- St. Barnabas Road, part of Maryland Route 414, U.S.
- St Barnabas (Madzimbabwe) Secondary School, Zimbabwe
- St. Barnabas (Bahamas Parliament constituency)

== See also ==
- Barnabas (disambiguation)
- San Barnaba (disambiguation)
- Nottingham Cathedral, the Cathedral Church of St. Barnabas, Nottingham, England
