= Tamás (surname) =

Tamás or Tamaș, the Hungarian word for "Thomas" and a common surname, can refer to:

- Barnabás Tamás (1952), Hungarian politician
- Gabriel Tamaș (1983), Romanian professional footballer
- Gáspár Miklós Tamás (1948–2023), Hungarian marxist-anarcho-syndicalist philosopher and public intellectual
- János Tamás (1936–1995), Hungarian-Swiss composer, conductor and music educator
- Krisztián Tamás (1995), Hungarian professional footballer
- László Tamás (1988), Romanian football player of Hungarian descent
- Márk Tamás (1993), Hungarian professional footballer
- Nándor Tamás (2000), Romanian professional footballer of Hungarian ethnicity
- Olivér Tamás (2001), Hungarian professional footballer
