= Tapiola (Sibelius) =

1926 tone poem by Jean Sibelius

- Tone poem by Jean Sibelius
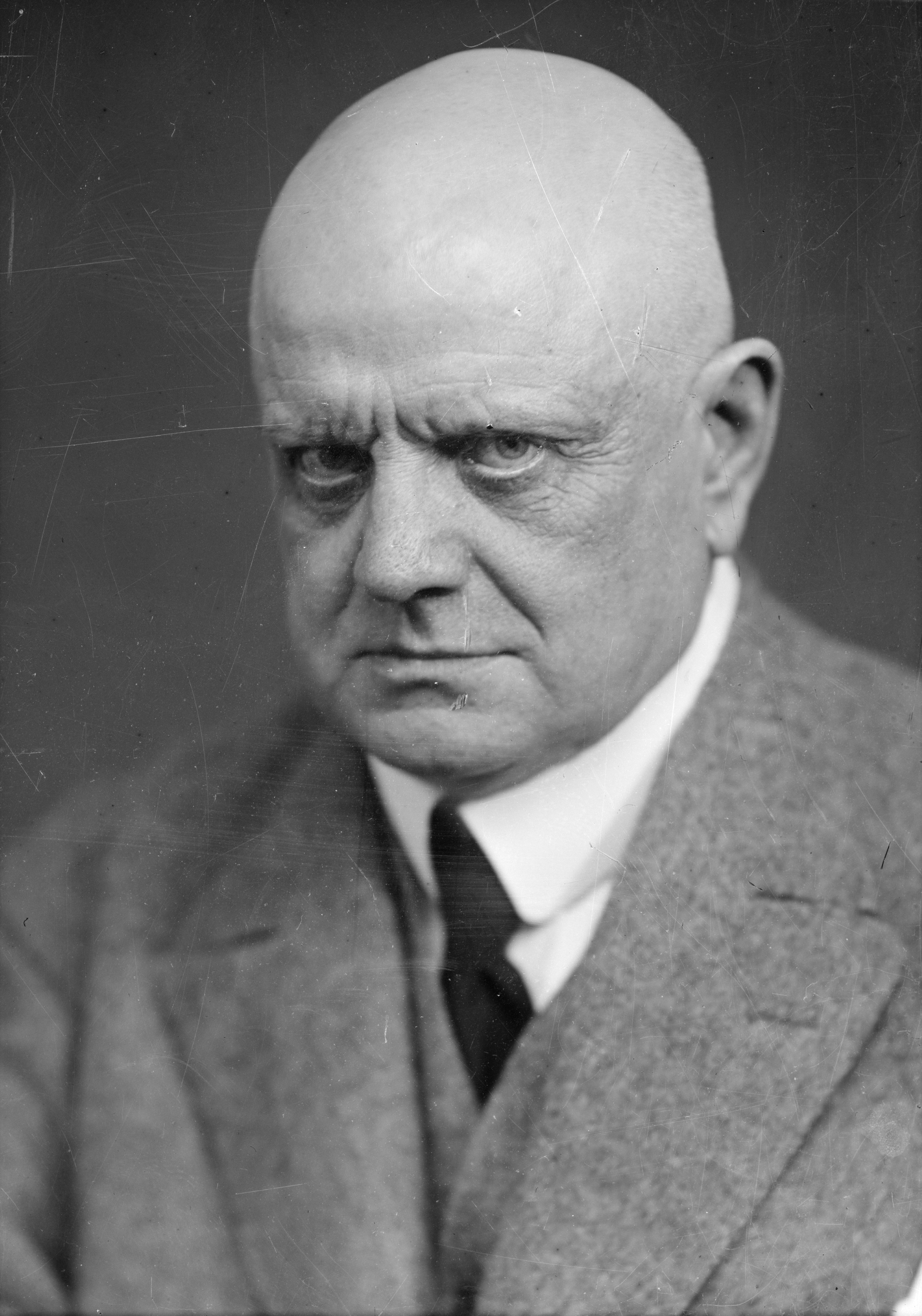
- The composer (c. 1927)
- Opus: 112
- Based on: Kalevala
- Composed: 1926
- Publisher: Breitkopf & Härtel (1926)
- Duration: 18 mins.

Premiere
- Date: 26 December 1926
- Location: New York City, New York
- Conductor: Walter Damrosch
- Performers: New York Symphony Society

Tapiola (literal English translation: "The Realm of Tapio"), Op. 112, is a tone poem by the Finnish composer Jean Sibelius, written in 1926 on a commission from Walter Damrosch for the New York Symphony Society. Tapiola portrays Tapio, the animating forest spirit mentioned throughout the Kalevala. It was premiered by Damrosch on 26 December 1926.

== History ==
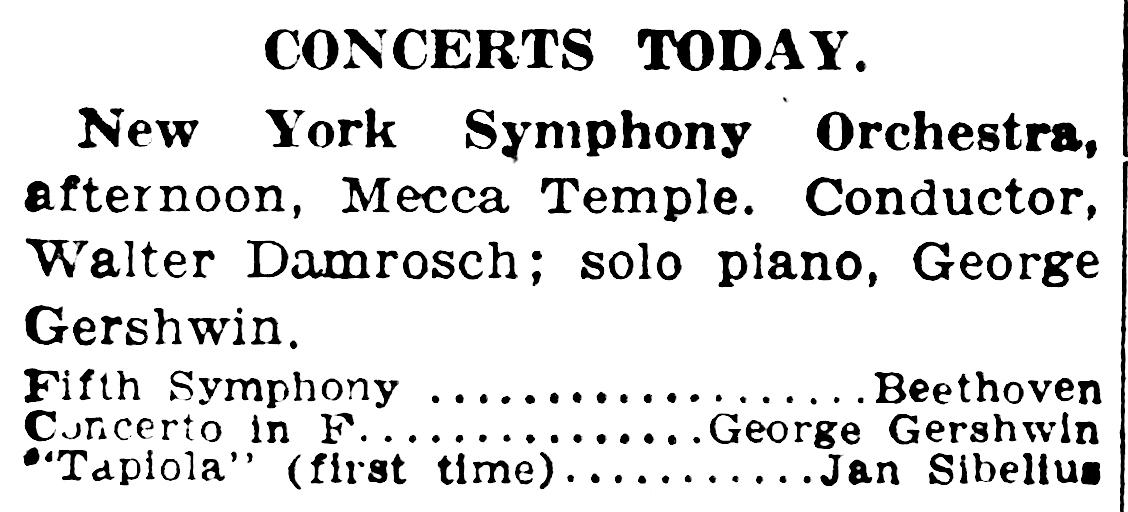
A 26 December 1926 advertisement from The New York Times promoting the premiere of Sibelius's Tapiola

When asked by the publisher to clarify the work's program, Sibelius responded with a prose explanation converted by his publisher (Breitkopf & Härtel) into a quatrain prefixed to English language editions of the score:

Wide-spread they stand, the Northland's dusky forests,
Ancient, mysterious, brooding savage dreams;
Within them dwells the Forest's mighty God,
And wood-sprites in the gloom weave magic secrets.

Tapiola was premiered by Walter Damrosch and the New York Symphonic Society on 26 December 1926. The program opened with Beethoven's Fifth Symphony, which was followed after the interval by Gershwin's Piano Concerto in F, played by the composer. Tapiola closed the concert.

The first performance in Finland on 25 April 1927 was conducted by Robert Kajanus, when the overture to The Tempest and the Seventh Symphony were also introduced to Finland. The composer Leevi Madetoja noted, "At times we hear the melancholy, repeated call of an elf, at times a lonely wanderer in the woods is giving vent to the pain of life. A beautiful work, technically close to the seventh symphony."

The piece was given its British premiere on 1 September 1928 at the Promenade Concerts, conducted by Henry Wood, a Queen's Hall.

The original publisher was Breitkopf & Härtel, who published most of the composer's works. Tapiola was Sibelius's last major work, though he lived for another thirty years. He began working on an Eighth Symphony, but he is said to have burned the sketches after becoming unhappy with the work.

== Instrumentation ==
Tapiola is scored for the following instruments, organized by family (woodwinds, brass, percussion, and strings):

- 3 flutes (the third doubling on piccolo), 2 oboes, 1 cor anglais, 2 clarinets (in A), 1 bass clarinet (in B♭), 2 bassoons, and 1 contrabassoon
- 4 horns (in E♭), 3 trumpets (in B♭), and 3 trombones
- Timpani
- Violins (I and II), violas, cellos, and double basses

== Music ==
A typical performance of Tapiola lasts between fifteen and twenty minutes.

The opening gesture from which the whole piece develops is:

Karl Ekman wrote in the Hufvudstadsbladet: "Indeed, Tapiola is a monothematic whole – although there has been disagreement as to whether the core motif can actually be considered a theme. Erkki Salmenhaara argues that it is not. In his view, the 'core' motif gives rise to at least four central, interconnected basic motifs. These, in their turn, produce 'around thirty highly characteristic, original and inimitably Sibelian musical motifs'."

== Discography ==
The Finnish conductor Robert Kajanus and the London Symphony Orchestra made the world premiere studio recording of Tapiola in June 1932, which appeared on Volume 1 of HMV's The Sibelius Society series (C 507, 1933). Since Kanajus's pioneering example, three conductors—in terms of superlatives—have made four recordings each: Sir Thomas Beecham (1946, 1954, 1955, and 1955); Herbert von Karajan (1953, 1964, 1976, and 1984); and Paavo Berglund (1968, 1972, 1982, and 1987). The table below lists these and other commercially available recordings:

No.	Conductor	Orchestra	Rec. (Note: Refers to the year in which the performers recorded the work; this may not be the same as the year in which the recording was first released to the general public.)	Time	Recording venue	Label	Ref.
1	Robert Kajanus	London Symphony Orchestra (1)	1932	18:04	Abbey Road Studio No. 1	Naxos Historical	(Note: R. Kajanus–Naxos Historical (8.111393) 2012)
2	Serge Koussevitzky	Boston Symphony Orchestra (1)	1939	17:19	Boston Symphony Hall	Naxos Historical	(Note: S. Koussevitzky–Naxos Historical (8.110168) 2004)
3	Sir Thomas Beecham (1)	Royal Philharmonic Orchestra (1)	1946	17:44	Abbey Road Studio No. 1	Biddulph	(Note: T. Beecham–Biddulph (WHL 055) 1998)
4	Eduard van Beinum	Royal Concertgebouw Orchestra	1952	18:05	Concertgebouw, Amsterdam	Decca	(Note: E. van Beinum–Decca (485 1387) 2023)
5	Herbert von Karajan (1)	Philharmonia Orchestra (1)	1953	20:15	Kingsway Hall	EMI Classics	(Note: H. Karajan–EMI Classics (7 2435 66602 2 9) 1998)
6	Sir Thomas Beecham (2)	Helsinki Philharmonic Orchestra (1)	1954	17:26	University of Helsinki Great Hall	Ondine	(Note: T. Beecham–Ondine (ODE 809-2) 1993)
7	Sir Thomas Beecham (3)	Royal Philharmonic Orchestra (2)	1955	17:25	Royal Festival Hall	BBC Music	(Note: T. Beecham–BBC Music (BBCL 4041-2) 2000)
8	Sir Thomas Beecham (4)	Royal Philharmonic Orchestra (3)	1955	17:47	Abbey Road Studio No. 1	EMI Classics	(Note: [ T. Beecham–EMI DRM(CDM 7 63400 2) 1990])
9	Eugene Ormandy (1)	Philadelphia Orchestra (1)	1955	18:03	Academy of Music, Philadelphia	Sony Classical	(Note: E. Ormandy–Sony Classical 2021)
10	Sir Adrian Boult	London Philharmonic Orchestra	1956	18:05	Walthamstow Town Hall	SOMM	(Note: A. Boult–SOMM (SOMMCD 093) 2009)
11	Hans Rosbaud	Berlin Philharmonic (1)	1957	18:26	Jesus-Christus-Kirche, Berlin	Deutsche Grammophon	(Note: H. Rosbaud–DG (447 453–2) 1996)
12	Tauno Hannikainen	London Symphony Orchestra (2)	1959	16:15	Walthamstow Town Hall	Everest	(Note: T. Hannikainen–Everest (SDBR–3045) 2014)
13	Ernest Ansermet	Orchestre de la Suisse Romande	1963	16:20	Victoria Hall, Geneva	Decca	(Note: E. Ansermet–Decca (485 1583) 2023)
14	Herbert von Karajan (2)	Berlin Philharmonic (2)	1964	20:11	Jesus-Christus-Kirche, Berlin	Deutsche Grammophon	(Note: H. Karajan–DG (457 748-2) 1999)
15	Carl von Garaguly	Berlin Radio Symphony Orchestra	1967	18:28	?	Berlin Classics	(Note: C. Garaguly–Berlin Classics (0030962BC) 1995)
16	Lorin Maazel	Vienna Philharmonic	1968	19:04	Sofiensaal	Decca	(Note: L. Maazel–Decca (289 466 995–2) 2000)
17	Paavo Berglund (1)	Finnish Radio Symphony Orchestra (1)	1968	16:08	Kulttuuritalo	Finlandia	(Note: P. Berglund–Finlandia (4509–95843–2) 19??)
18	Paavo Berglund (2)	Bournemouth Symphony Orchestra	1972	18:11	Southampton Guildhall	EMI Classics	(Note: P. Berglund–EMI Classics (50999 9 73600 2 5) 2013)
19	Eugene Ormandy (2)	Philadelphia Orchestra (2)	1976	19:55	Scottish Rite Cathedral, Philadelphia	Sony Classical	(Note: E. Ormandy–Sony Classical (88875108582) 2015)
20	Sir Colin Davis (1)	Boston Symphony Orchestra (2)	1976	17:59	Symphony Hall, Boston	Decca Records	(Note: C. Davis–Decca (478 3696) 2012)
21	Herbert von Karajan (3)	Berlin Philharmonic (3)	1976	19:14	Berlin Philharmonie	EMI Classics	(Note: H. Karajan–EMI Classics (CDM 7 64331 2) 1992)
22	Sir Alexander Gibson	Royal Scottish National Orchestra	1977	15:34	Glasgow City Halls	Chandos	(Note: A. Gibson–Chandos (CHAN 8395/6) 1985)
23	Vladimir Ashkenazy (1)	Philharmonia Orchestra (2)	1982	18:11	Kingsway Hall	Decca	(Note: V. Ashkenazy–Decca (411 935–2) 1984)
24	Paavo Berglund (3)	Philharmonia Orchestra (3)	1982	17:14	St. John's, Smith Square	EMI	(Note: P. Berglund–EMI Digital (CDC 7 47484 2) 1983)
25	Herbert von Karajan (4)	Berlin Philharmonic (4)	1984	20:13	Berlin Philharmonie	Deutsche Grammophon	(Note: H. Karajan–DG (413 755–2) 1984)
26	Pierre Bartholomée	Orchestre Philharmonique de Liège	1985	19:22	Royal Conservatory of Liège	Ricercar	(Note: P. Bartholomée–Ricercar (RIC 030) 19??)
27	Neeme Järvi (1)	Gothenburg Symphony Orchestra (1)	1985	18:48	Gothenburg Concert Hall	BIS	(Note: N. Järvi–BIS (CD–312) 1986)
28	Akeo Watanabe	Japan Philharmonic Orchestra	1986	17:29	?	Japan PO	(Note: A. Watanabe–Japan PO (JPFO0001) 2012)
29	Paavo Berglund (4)	Helsinki Philharmonic Orchestra (2)	1987	14:52	Kulttuuritalo	Warner Classics	(Note: P. Berglund–Warner Classics (0190295869151) 2017)
30	Jukka-Pekka Saraste	Finnish Radio Symphony Orchestra (2)	1988	16:30	Kulttuuritalo	RCA Red Seal	(Note: J. Saraste–RCA (19439704812) 2020)
31	Herbert Blomstedt	San Francisco Symphony	1991	19:28	Davies Symphony Hall	Decca	(Note: H. Blomstedt–Decca (475 7677) 2006)
32	Vassily Sinaisky	Moscow Philharmonic Orchestra	1991	18:41	Mosfilm Studios	Brilliant Classics	(Note: V. Sinaisky–Brilliant Classics (BC9212) 2010)
33	Leif Segerstam (1)	Danish National Symphony Orchestra	1992	21:08	Danish Radio Concert Hall	Chandos	(Note: L. Segerstam–Chandos (CHAN 9083) 1992)
34	Sir Colin Davis (2)	London Symphony Orchestra (3)	1992	18:29	Watford Town Hall	RCA Red Seal	(Note: C. Davis–RCA Red Seal (82876–55706–2) 2003)
35	Enrique Batiz	Royal Philharmonic Orchestra (4)	1994	18:01	St Barnabas' Church, Mitcham	IMP Classics	(Note: E. Batiz–IMP Classics (IMP1114) 1994)
36	Leif Segerstam (2)	Helsinki Philharmonic Orchestra (3)	1994	19:20	Finlandia Hall	Ondine	(Note: L. Segerstam–Ondine (ODE 852–2) 1996)
37	Neeme Järvi (2)	Gothenburg Symphony Orchestra (2)	1995	20:09	Gothenburg Concert Hall	Deutsche Grammophon	(Note: N. Järvi–DG (477 6654) 2007)
38	Sir Andrew Davis	Royal Stockholm Philharmonic Orchestra (1)	1996	18:47	Stockholm Concert Hall	Finlandia	(Note: A. Davis–Finlandia (0630–15242–2) 1997)
39	Osmo Vänskä	Lahti Symphony Orchestra (1)	1997	17:22	Ristinkirkko	BIS	(Note: O. Vänskä BIS (CD–864) 1997)
40	Petri Sakari	Iceland Symphony Orchestra	2000	18:43	[unknown venue], Reykjavík	Naxos	(Note: P. Sakari–Naxos (8.555299) 2002)
41	Sakari Oramo (1)	City of Birmingham Symphony Orchestra	2003	15:42	Symphony Hall	Erato, Warner Classics	(Note: S. Oramo–Erato (2564 60294-2) 2003)
42	Vladimir Ashkenazy (2)	Royal Stockholm Philharmonic Orchestra (2)	2007	18:47	Stockholm Concert Hall	Exton	(Note: V. Ashkenazy–Exton (OVCL–00292) 2007)
43	Okko Kamu	Lahti Symphony Orchestra (2)	2011	17:36	Sibelius Hall	BIS	(Note: O. Kamu–BIS (SACD–1945) 2011)
44	Robert Spano	Atlanta Symphony Orchestra	2013	19:45	Woodruff Arts Center	ASO Media	(Note: R. Spano–ASO Media (CD–004) 2013)
45	Sakari Oramo (2)	BBC Symphony Orchestra	2015	18:03	Royal Albert Hall	BBC Music Magazine	(Note: S. Oramo–BBC Music Mag (BBCMM441) 2019)
46	Hannu Lintu	Finnish Radio Symphony Orchestra (3)	2016	18:14	Helsinki Music Centre	Ondine	(Note: H. Lintu–Ondine (ODE 1289-5)2017)
47	Edward Gardner	Bergen Philharmonic Orchestra	2021	18:02	Grieg Hall	Chandos	(Note: E. Gardner–Chandos (CHSA 5217) 2021)
48	Klaus Mäkelä	Oslo Philharmonic	2021	19:23	Oslo Concert Hall	Decca	(Note: K. Mäkelä–Decca (4852256) 2022)
49	Ryan Bancroft	BBC National Orchestra of Wales	2022	19:44	BBC Hoddinott Hall	BBC Music Magazine	(Note: R. Bancroft–BBC Music Magazine (BBC MM478) 2022)

== Notes, references, and sources ==
=== Sources ===
- Dahlström, Fabian [in Swedish] (2003). Jean Sibelius: Thematisch-bibliographisches Verzeichnis seiner Werke [Jean Sibelius: A Thematic Bibliographic Index of His Works] (in German). Wiesbaden: Breitkopf & Härtel. ISBN 3-7651-0333-0.
