= Harris M. Stephenson =

American architect (1845–1909)

- Born: January 18, 1845; Boston
- Died: May 16, 1909 (aged 64); Boston
- Occupation: Architect
- Practice: Appleton & Stephenson; H. M. Stephenson

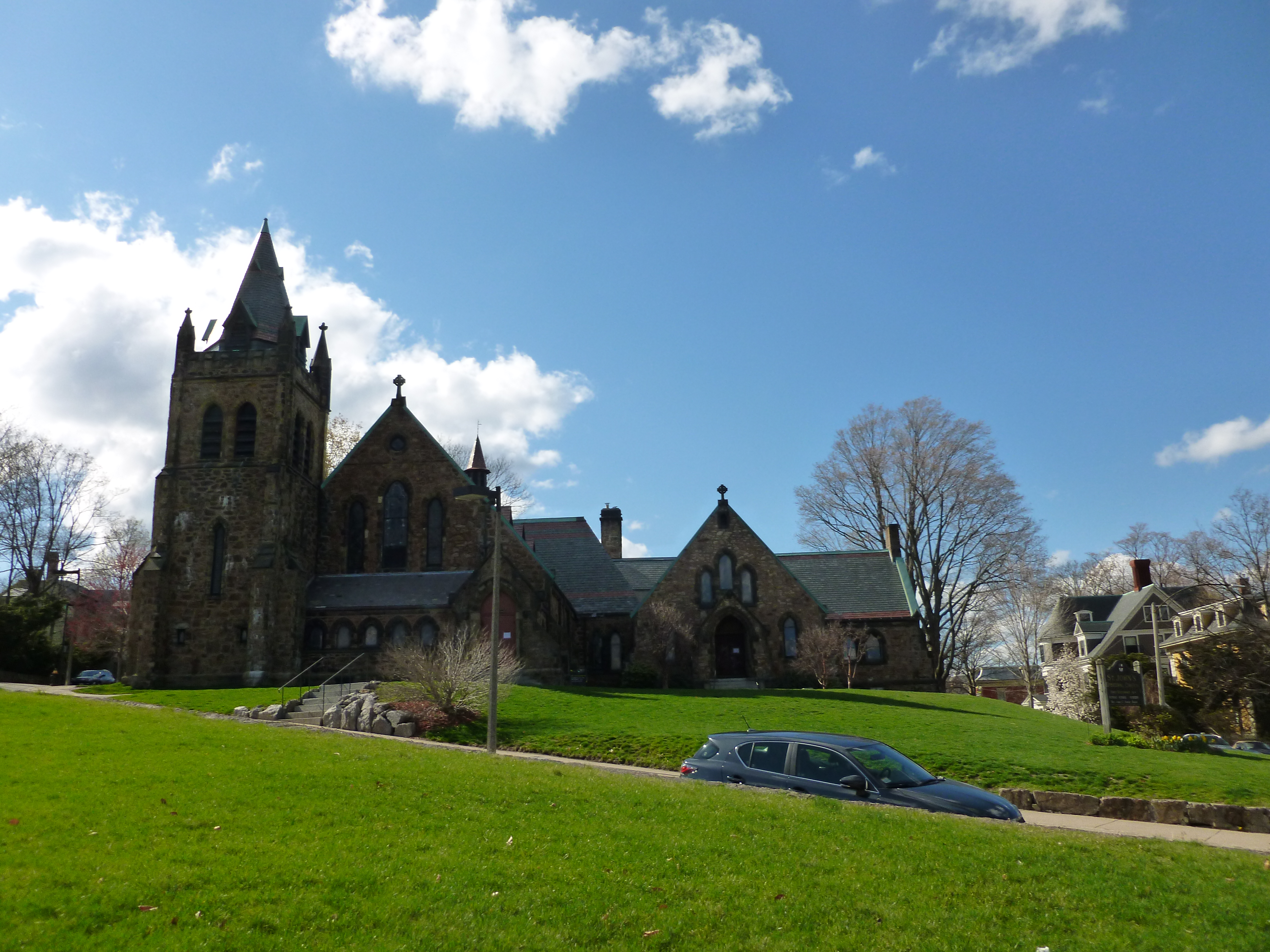
St. John's Episcopal Church in Jamaica Plain, Boston, designed by Appleton & Stephenson in the Gothic Revival style and completed in 1882.

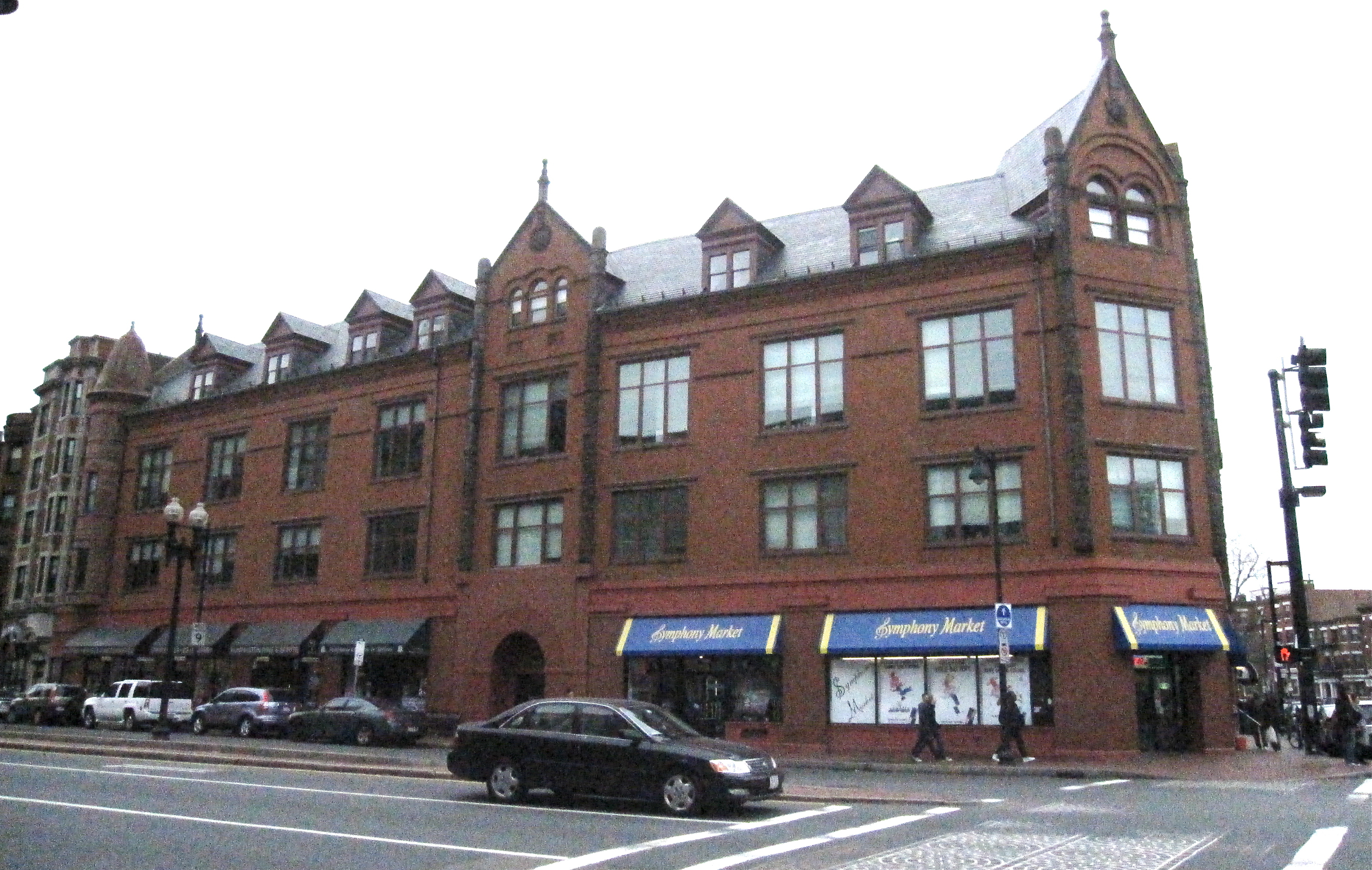
The former Free Surgical Hospital for Women in Boston, designed by Appleton & Stephenson in the Richardsonian Romanesque style and completed in 1886.

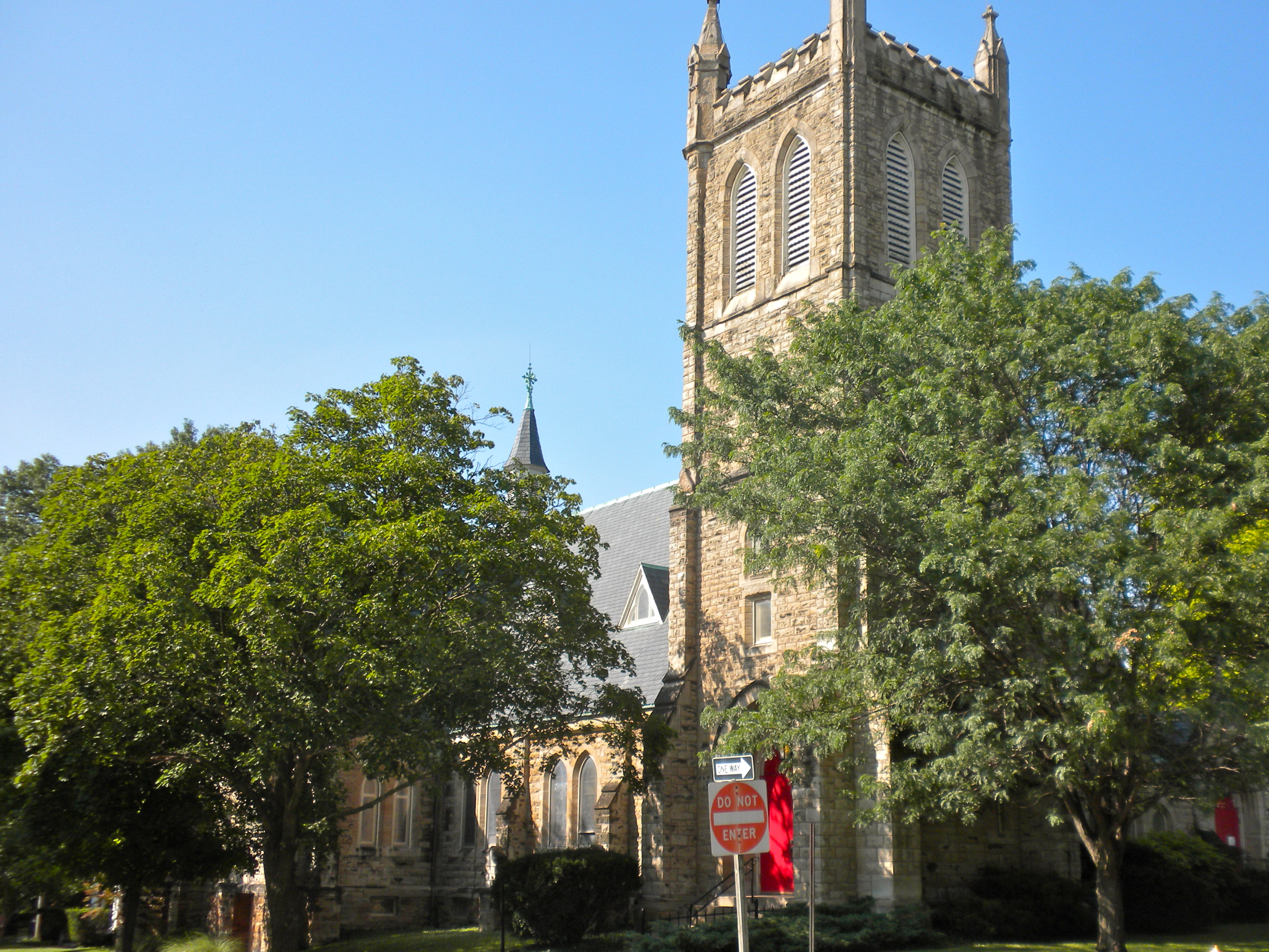
St. John's Episcopal Church in Keokuk, Iowa, designed by Appleton & Stephenson in the Gothic Revival style and completed in 1888.

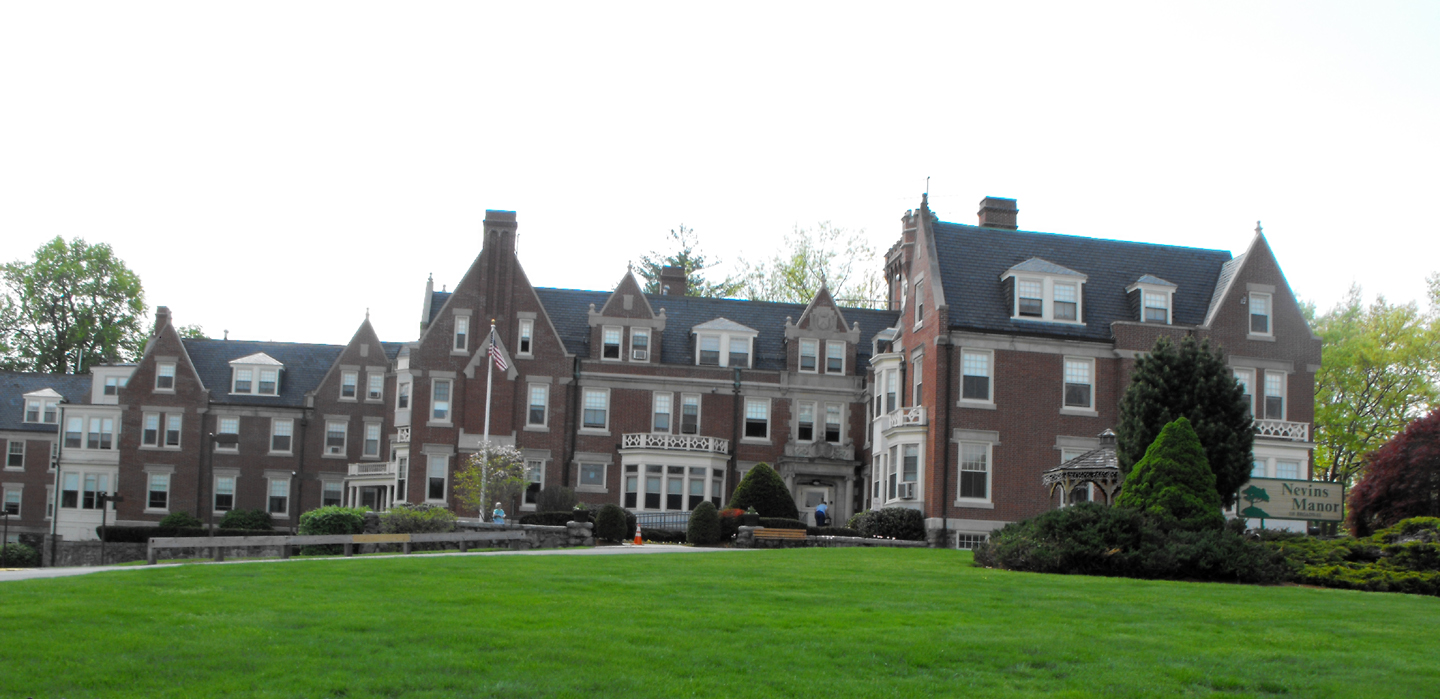
The former Henry C. Nevins Home for Aged and Incurables in Methuen, designed by Stephenson in the Châteauesque style and completed in 1906.

Harris M. Stephenson (January 18, 1845 – May 16, 1909) was an American architect in practice in Boston from 1870 until his death in 1909.

== Life and career ==
Harris Marshall Stephenson was born January 18, 1845 in Boston to Benjamin Turner Stephenson and Nancy Kelleran Stephenson, née Hall. He attended the public schools before joining the office of his uncle, architect Samuel C. Bugbee. In 1861 Bugbee relocated to San Francisco and Stephenson moved to the office of Nathaniel Jeremiah Bradlee. Circa 1870 he left Bradlee to begin his own practice, Appleton & Stephenson, in partnership with Daniel Appleton. They dissolved their partnership circa 1888 and Stephenson practiced independently for the remainder of his life.

Stephenson's practice was centered around Boston and Massachusetts, but he also completed projects in California, Maine, New Hampshire, New Jersey, New York and elsewhere.

== Personal life ==
Stephenson was married in 1871 to Harriet Walter Currier. They had one child, Harris Walter Stephenson, who was born in 1874. In May, 1896 Mrs. Stephenson and their son embarked on a three-month tour of Europe. For their return, on August 13 they left Boulogne on board the SS Spaarndam, bound for New York City. On August 20, while the ship was passing south of the Grand Banks, Mrs. Stephenson abruptly committed suicide by jumping overboard. She had previously been diagnosed with neurasthenia and was believed to have suffered from temporary insanity. Her body was not recovered.

Stephenson died May 16, 1909 at his home in Jamaica Plain at the age of 64.

== Legacy ==
At least two buildings designed by Stephenson have been listed on the United States National Register of Historic Places, and others contribute to listed historic districts.

== Architectural works ==
- 1879 – Daniel Slade house, (Note: A contributing resource to the Old Chestnut Hill Historic District, NRHP-listed in 1986. Now Hovey House of Boston College.) 258 Hammond St, Chestnut Hill, Massachusetts
- 1882 – St. John's Episcopal Church, (Note: A contributing resource to the Sumner Hill Historic District, NRHP-listed in 1987.) 1 Roanoke Ave, Jamaica Plain, Boston
- 1884 – Blow-Me-Down, the Charles Cotesworth Beaman house, (Note: Demolished.) Wilson Rd, Cornish, New Hampshire
- 1886 – St. George's Episcopal Church, Woodbridge Rd, York Harbor, Maine
- 1888 – Edward Burgess house, (Note: A contributing resource to the Back Bay Historic District, NRHP-listed in 1973.) 503 Beacon St, Boston
- 1888 – St. John's Episcopal Church, (Note: NRHP-listed.) 208 N 4th St, Keokuk, Iowa
- 1890 – Turk's Head Inn, 151 South St, Rockport, Massachusetts
- 1891 – George A. Ballantine house, 326 Beacon St, Boston
- 1895 – Jacob Amos house, (Note: A contributing resource to the Oswego–Oneida Streets Historic District, NRHP-listed in 1982.) 16 W Oneida St, Baldwinsville, New York
- 1897 – Meriden Congregational Church, 5 Mitchell Dr, Meriden, New Hampshire
- 1901 – Emerson Hall, (Note: A contributing resource to the Castine Historic District, NRHP-listed in 1973.) 67 Court St, Castine, Maine
- 1904 – German Reformed Christ Church, 120 Chestnut Ave, Jamaica Plain, Boston
- 1906 – Henry C. Nevins Home for Aged and Incurables (former), 110 Broadway, Methuen, Massachusetts
