= Barnby =

Barnby may refer to:

Places

- Barnby, North Yorkshire, England
  - location of East Barnby and West Barnby
- Barnby, Suffolk, England
- Barnby in the Willows, Nottinghamshire, England
- Barnby Moor, Nottinghamshire, England

People

- Joseph Barnby

Ships

- SS Barnby, a number of ships with this name

== See also ==
- Barnaby (disambiguation)
