= Barnaba =

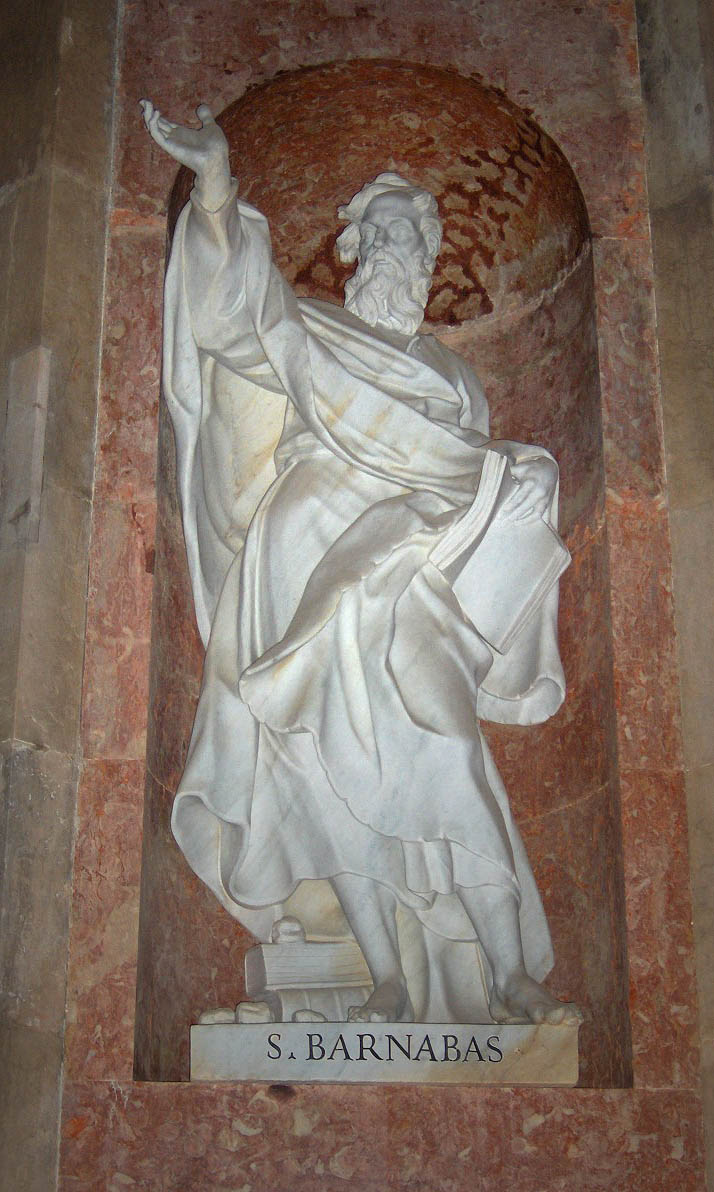
Saint Barnabas

Barnaba is an Italian masculine given name. It is a New Testament name which means "son of the prophet". It may refer to:

- Barnaba Cagnoli, 14th-century Italian friar from Vercelli
- Barnaba da Modena, Italian painter of the mid-14th century Lombardy
- Barnaba Oriani, (17 July 1752 – 12 November 1832), Italian priest, geodesist, astronomer and scientist
- Barnaba Tortolini, (19 November 1808 – 24 August 1874) was a 19th-century Italian priest and mathematician

== See also ==
- Barnabas (name)
- Banaba (disambiguation)
- San Barnaba (disambiguation)
- Barnabites
