= Banaba (disambiguation) =

Banaba is an island in the Pacific Ocean.

Banaba may also refer to:

- Banaba (Lagerstroemia speciosa), a type of tree that grows in most of Southeast Asia, including Thailand, the Philippines and Malaysia
- Banaba, an area in Batangas City, the Philippines
- Banaba, an area in Tarlac City, the Philippines
- Banaba, a district near Cotenna in Roman Asia Minor

== See also ==
- Barnaba (disambiguation)
