= St. John's Episcopal Church (Keokuk, Iowa) =

- St. John’s Episcopal Church and Parish Hall
- U.S. National Register of Historic Places
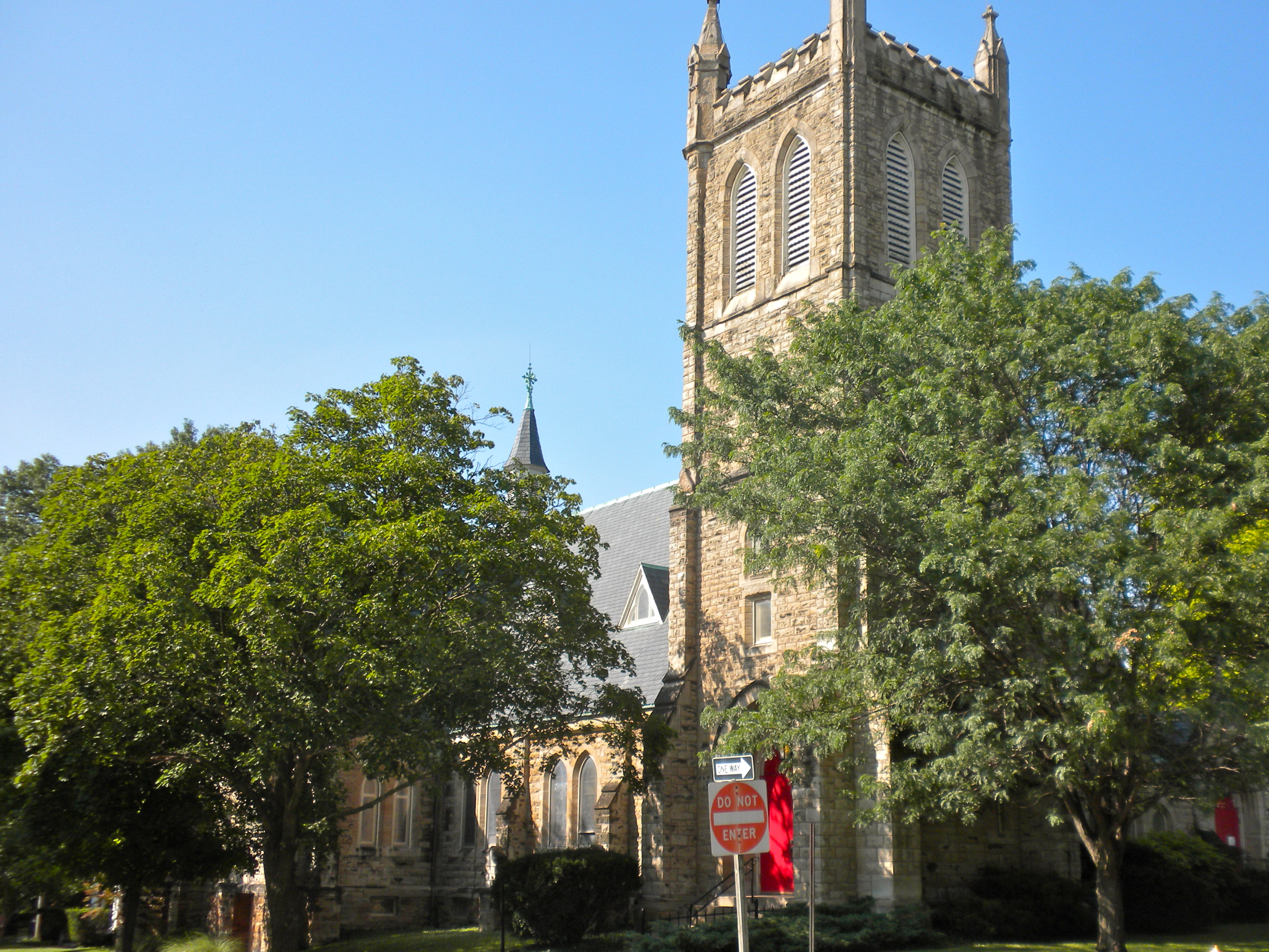

- Location within Iowa Location within the United States
- Location: 4th and Concert Streets; Keokuk, Iowa
- Coordinates: 40°23′48″N 91°22′50″W
- Area: less than one acre
- Built: 1884-1888
- Architect: Appleton & Stephenson
- Architectural style: Gothic Revival
- NRHP reference No.: 89000806
- Added to NRHP: July 11, 1989

St. John's Episcopal Church is a parish church in the Episcopal Diocese of Iowa. It is located in Keokuk, Iowa, United States. It was listed, together with the parish hall, on the National Register of Historic Places in 1989.

Average Sunday Attendance (ASA) reported in 2024 was 22 persons. This was a relative decrease from ASA of 33 persons reported in 2016. No membership statistics were reported in 2024 national parochial reports.

== History ==
St. John's Church was begun by the Rt. Rev. Jackson Kemper, Missionary Bishop of the Northwest, on April 20, 1850. The Rev. Otis Hackett served as the first rector of the church from 1850 to 1853. The first frame church for the parish was built under his direction in 1851. The property, on which the present church also stands, was a gift from Josiah Spalding of St. Louis. Services were held in parishioners' homes until it was completed.

St. John's was one of five founding parishes that established the Diocese of Iowa in 1853. It also established five Episcopalian missions in and around Keokuk. That number includes St. Barnabas in Montrose and St. Mary the Virgin in Keokuk. The latter was the first black Episcopal Church established in Iowa. None of the missions exist today.

During the Civil War several St. John parishioners left to serve in the Union Army. Included in their number were Generals Samuel Ryan Curtis, who was serving as a congressman at the time, Hugh Thompson Reid, James C. Parrott, and William W. Belknap, who was later Secretary of War under President Ulysses S. Grant. Other parishioners included Colonels William H. Worthington and John A. McDowell. "No other city in Iowa furnished as many high ranking officers as did Keokuk, and no other church could boast as many regimental commanders and generals from (its) membership."

The present church building was designed by Boston architects Appleton & Stephenson. It was built by F. W. Menke of Quincy, Illinois. The Rev. Robert C. McIlwain was rector at the time. Work was begun on the structure on June 5, 1884, and the first services were held in the church on February 12, 1888. The church was consecrated on January 4, 1891, by Bishop William Stevens Perry. The parish hall was constructed in 1895. It was designed by the same architects and built by the same contractor as the church. It contains space for parish offices, education, and social uses. The rectory, located next to the church, was completed in 1913. It was completed by the Rev. John C. Sage, who would become the bishop of the Diocese of Western Kansas.

== Architecture ==
The church is a combination of Gothic Revival in its style and Richardsonian Romanesque in its form and massing. The building measures 118 feet (36 m) long and 48 feet (15 m) high. The nave is 54 feet (16 m) wide with a transept that measure 82 feet (25 m) in total width. The corner bell tower is 75 feet (23 m) high and contains the bell from the original church. Both the church and the hall are built of Bedford limestone and they have a slate roof.

The interior of the church contains hand-carved furnishings by William Bartels of Carthage, Illinois. He carved the reredos, altar, altar rail, chancel screen and the ends of the pews. The three panels on the front of the altar depict grapes and wheat to represent the Eucharist, and a bas relief of Christ carrying the cross. The baptismal font, carved by William Bawden in limestone, is the only item in the interior from the original church.

The church has more than forty stained glass windows. Most were installed at the time of construction; others were added over the years. The most recent window was installed in the 1970s. Seven different companies provided windows for the church, including Franz Mayer & Co. of Munich, Germany, Tiffany Studios of New York City, and the J. Wippell & Company of Exeter, England.

The pipe organ was built in 1965 by the Temple Organ Company of Lamoni, Iowa. It contains 22 registers, 27 ranks, and 1,520 pipes. There is a processional organ in the rear of the nave.
