= Barnabas Daru =

Plant ecologist and biogeographer

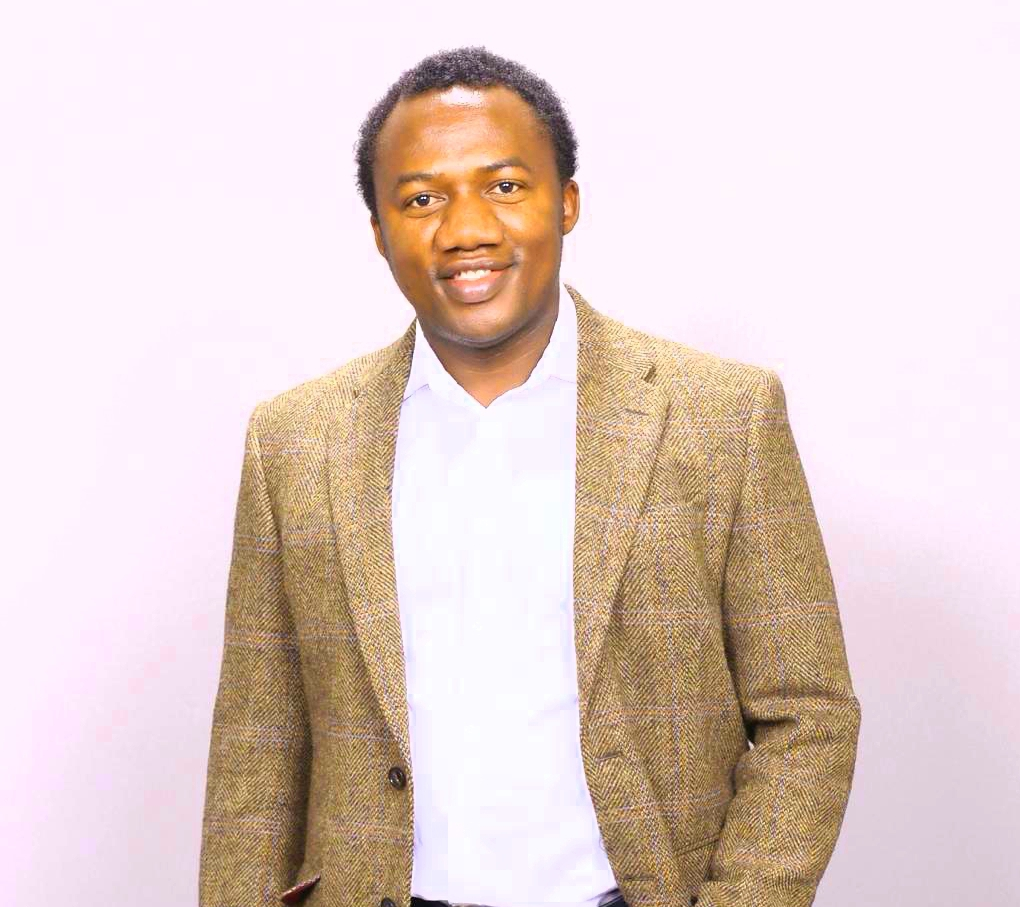
- Daru in 2022
- Citizenship: Nigerian-American
- Education: University of Jos; University of Johannesburg; Harvard University
- Awards: MacArthur & Wilson Awardee, IBS (2026); Sloan Research Fellow (2025); Fellow of Linnean Society of London (2025)
- Scientific career
- Fields: Ecology, Biogeography, Conservation
- Workplaces: Stanford University; Harvard University
- Website: Stanford profile Daru Lab

Barnabas H. Daru is a Nigerian-American plant ecologist and biogeographer. He is an Assistant Professor of Biology at Stanford University, where he studies global patterns of plant diversity and the ecological and evolutionary processes that shape them. Daru's work has been featured in scientific and popular outlets including the Harvard Gazette, Phys.org, and Earth.com, and his research has been published in journals such as Science, Nature Communications, PNAS, and New Phytologist.

== Early life and education ==
Daru was born in Jos, Nigeria. He earned a Bachelor’s degree in Zoology from the University of Jos in 2007 and completed a Ph.D. in Botany at the University of Johannesburg in 2015. He was a postdoctoral fellow at Harvard University from 2016 to 2018.

== Academic career ==
Daru served as a faculty member at Texas A&M University–Corpus Christi from 2018 to 2022 before joining the biology faculty at Stanford University. His research focuses on biodiversity informatics, phylogenetics, and conservation science, with particular emphasis on plant distributions and ecological interactions under environmental change.

== Research ==
Daru has contributed to identifying spatial patterns of plant endemism, documenting herbarium sampling biases, and developing analytical tools to manage biodiversity data. His research integrates physical and digitized herbarium records, large-scale biodiversity databases, and computational modeling.

=== Biodiversity informatics ===
Daru developed the R package phyloregion, an open-source software tool for biogeographic regionalization and macroecological analysis. The package is designed to handle large datasets and facilitate ecosystem classification using measures of phylogenetic and compositional diversity. He applied this tool to analyze global patterns of seagrass diversity, finding that temperate regions host more evolutionarily distinct species compared to tropical areas. His research also assessed the potential impact of climate change on seagrass distribution and diversity.

=== Plant interactions from herbarium specimens ===
Daru has explored the use of historical herbarium specimens to study plant ecological interactions with other living things, such as herbivores, pollinators, microorganisms, or plant competitors. His lab has used DNA sequencing methods to recover microbial communities from dried plant samples, offering insights into long-term changes in plant-microbe interactions. This research has implications for understanding how microbial symbioses and pathogenic threats respond to anthropogenic environmental pressures.

== Selected publications ==
- Daru, B.H., Nichodemus, C.O. & Henao-Diaz, L.F. (2026). “Biogeographic processes underlying global patterns of plant diversity.” Science, 392, 845-849. doi:10.1126/science.adv6172
- Daru, B.H. et al. (2024). “Predicting undetected native vascular plant diversity at a global scale.” PNAS, 121: e23199891217. doi:10.1073/pnas.2319989121
- Minev-Benzecry, S., Daru, B.H. (2024). “Climate change alters the future of natural floristic regions of deep evolutionary origins.” Nature Communications, 15: 9474. doi:10.1038/s41467-024-53860-8
- Daru, B.H., Rock, B.M. (2023). “Reorganization of seagrass communities in a changing climate.” Nature Plants, 9: 1034–1043. doi:10.1038/s41477-023-01445-6
- Daru, B.H. et al. (2021). “Widespread homogenization of plant communities in the Anthropocene.” Nature Communications, 12: 6983. doi:10.1038/s41467-021-27186-8
- Daru, B.H. et al. (2020). “Endemism patterns are scale dependent.” Nature Communications, 11: 2115. doi:10.1038/s41467-020-15921-6

== Awards and honors ==
- MacArthur & Wilson Awardee, International Biogeography Society (2026)
- Sloan Research Fellow, Alfred P. Sloan Foundation (2025)
- Elected Fellow, Linnean Society of London (2025)
- Postdoctoral Fellow, Harvard University (2016–2018)
- Winner, New Phytologist Poster Prize (2015)

== Professional service ==
- Associate Editor, American Journal of Botany (2021–2022)
- Reviewing Editor, eLife (2020–2024)
- Guest Editor, Philosophical Transactions of the Royal Society B (2016–2019)
