= Barnaby Conrad III =

American painter and writer

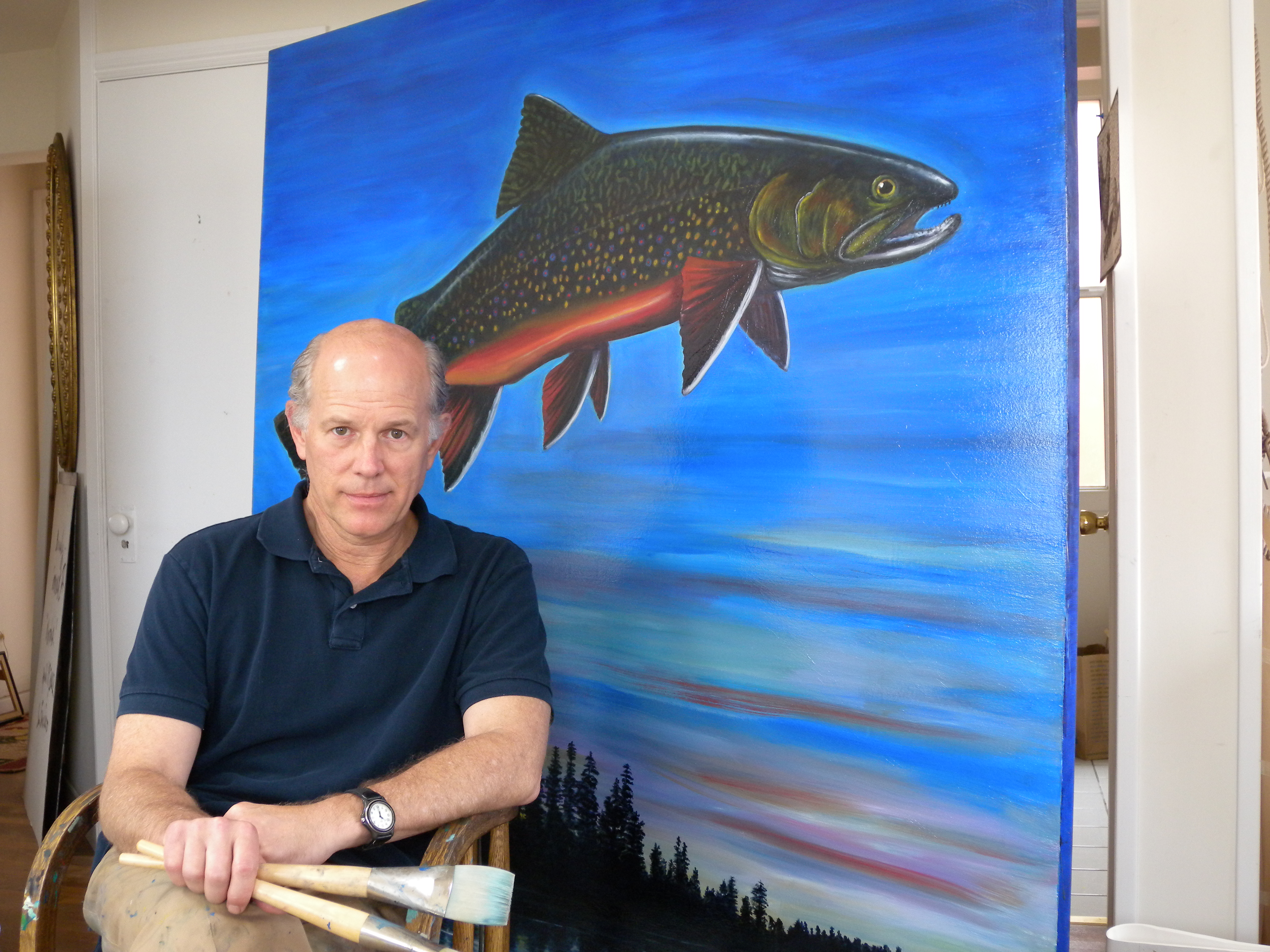
- Barnaby Conrad III, with his painting of leaping trout, in 2009.
- Born: 1952 (age 73–74); San Francisco, California, U.S.
- Spouse: Martha Sutherland

Barnaby Conrad III (born 1952) is an American author, artist, and editor.

== Early years ==
Conrad was born in San Francisco in 1952, the son of author Barnaby Conrad, Jr and architect Dale (Cowgill) Crichton. His father was an amateur bullfighter, and published the bestselling book Matador the same year that Conrad III was born. It is said that Conrad III barely escaped being named after his father's friend Juan Belmonte.

== Education ==
Conrad graduated from the Taft School in Watertown, Connecticut, then studied painting and illustration at Yale University, under Lester Johnson and Maurice Sendak.

== Early career ==
After graduating Yale with a B.A. in Fine Arts in 1975, Conrad worked as a journalist and magazine editor. His first published story was about his experiences running with the bulls in Pamplona, which he sold to the San Francisco Examiner for $100. Much of his work was for art magazines: he was one of the founding editors of Art World in the 1970s, and a senior editor of Horizon from 1979 to 1980. In 1982, Conrad moved to Paris and became an adventure travel writer. He wrote articles about riding trains across India, skiing in the Alps, and hot air ballooning over Germany, for magazines such as Condé Nast Traveler, and Forbes Life, for which he served as editor-at-large.

== Book author ==
Conrad's first book credit was as an illustrator of his father's children's book, Zorro - A Fox in the City, in 1971. He co-authored a book of interviews with photographers in 1977, then didn't write any more books until Absinthe: History In a Bottle, in 1988, his first book as a solo author. As of 2011, Conrad has authored over 11 non-fiction books, and hundreds of magazine articles for over 30 publications. The Martini: An Illustrated History of an American Classic (1995) has sold over 160,000 hardcover copies. He has taught other aspiring authors at the Santa Barbara Writers Conference, which was founded by his father.

== Publishing ==
In 2009, Conrad joined independent book publisher Council Oak Books, where he founded a new imprint, "Kanbar & Conrad Books", with inventor-philanthropist Maurice Kanbar. The inaugural book of the imprint was The Second Life of John Wilkes Booth, by Conrad's father, Barnaby Conrad.

== Painting ==
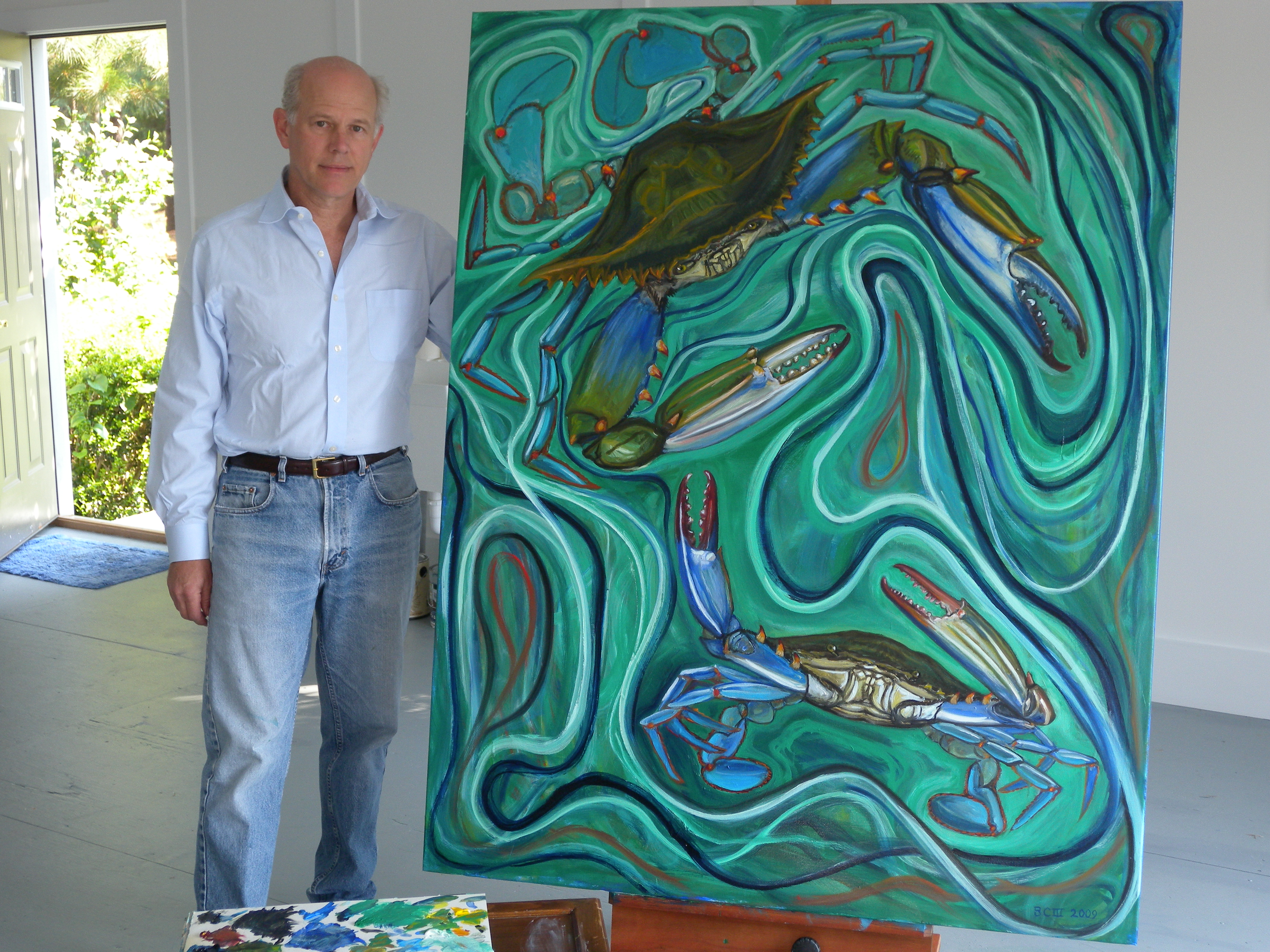
Conrad with crab painting in 2009

Though Conrad painted throughout his career, he didn't return to showing his works professionally until later in life. He exhibited in 20 group shows in San Francisco, and held his first solo show in New York City, in 2009, at his wife's gallery, M. Sutherland Fine Arts. It focused on aquatic animals from his hobby, fly fishing.

== Personal life ==
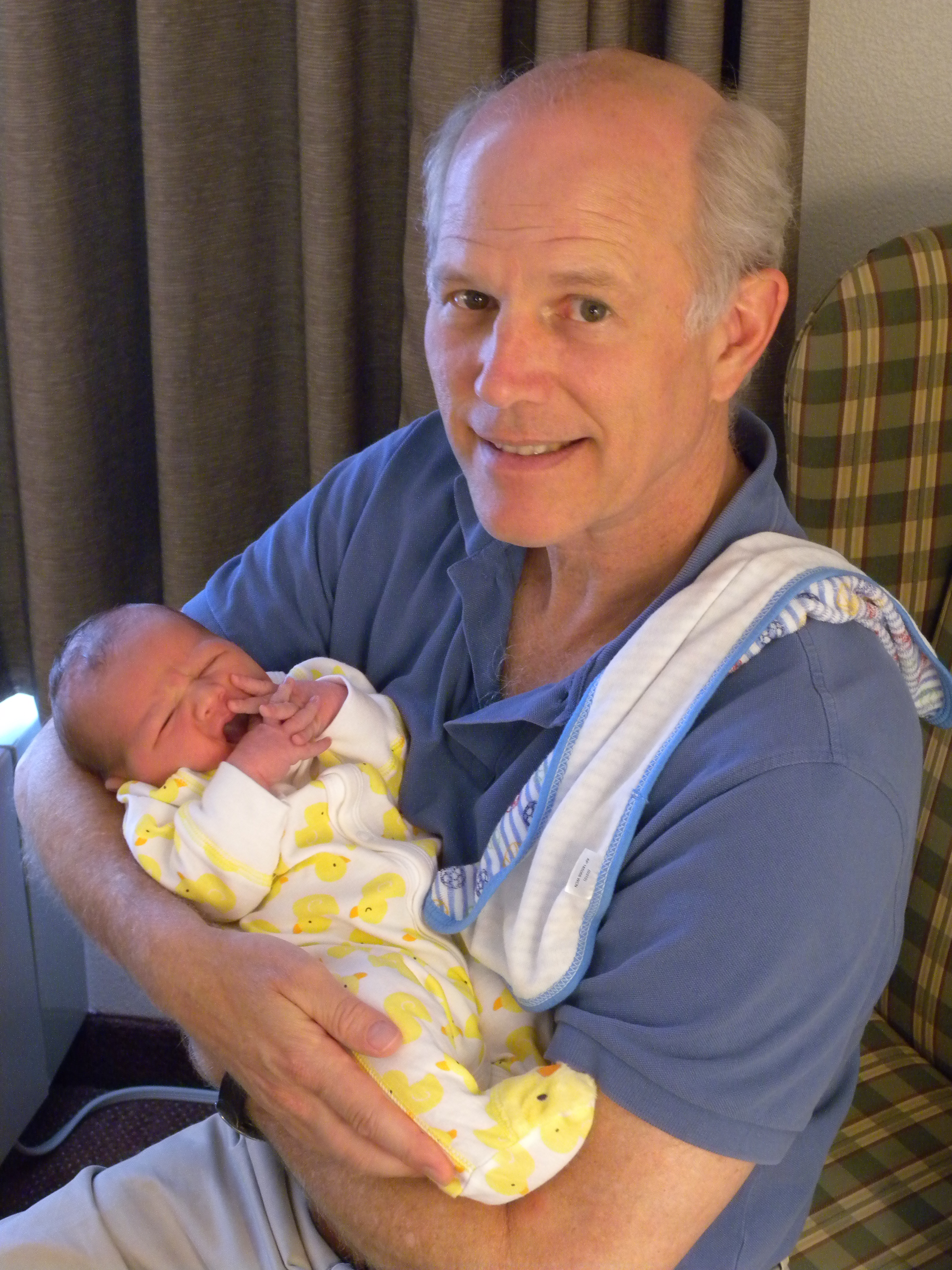
Conrad holding his infant son, Jack, in 2010

Conrad married art gallery owner Martha Sutherland on May 24, 2003.

== Bibliography ==
- Zorro - A Fox in the City (illustrator). Written by Barnaby Conrad. 1971, Doubleday; ISBN 978-0-385-04149-2.
- Interviews with Master Photographers: Minor White, Imogen Cunningham, Cornell Capa, Elliot Erwit, Yousef Karsh, Arnold Newman, Lord Snowden, Brett Weston. With James Danziger. 1977, Paddington Press; ISBN 978-0-448-22203-5.
- Absinthe: History In a Bottle. 1988, Chronicle Books; ISBN 978-0-87701-566-6.
- Gottfried Helnwein: Paintings, Drawings, Photographs: 1992, Modernism, Inc.
- The Martini: An Illustrated History of an American Classic. 1995, Chronicle Books; ISBN 978-0-8118-0717-3.
- The Cigar: An Illustrated History of Fine Smoking. 1996, Chronicle Books; ISBN 978-0-7567-6301-5.
- Les Chiens de Paris. 1996, Chronicle Books; ISBN 0-8118-0743-6.
- Les Chats de Paris. 1996, Chronicle Books; ISBN 0-8118-1186-7.
- The Blonde: A Celebration of the Golden Era from Harlowe to Monroe. 1999, Chronicle Books; ISBN 978-0-8118-2262-6.
- John Register: Persistent Observer. 1999, Woodford Press; ISBN 978-0-942627-50-3.
- Pan Am: An Aviation Legend. 1999, Woodford Press; ISBN 978-0-942627-55-8.
- Mark Stock: Paintings. 2000, Duane Press; ISBN 978-0-942627-64-0.
- Ghost Hunting in Montana: A Search for Roots in the Old West. 2003, The Lyons Press; ISBN 978-1-58574-720-7.
- Richard Diebenkorn: Figurative Works on Paper (with John McEnroe and Jane Livingston. 2003, Chronicle Books; ISBN 978-0-8118-4218-1.
- Valentin Popov (with Robert Flynn Johnson). 2008, Modernism, Inc.; ISBN 978-0-9761509-5-4
- David Bates: the Tropics. 2008, John Berggruen Gallery.
- The Bachelor's Progress. 2012, Council Oak Distribution;. ISBN 978-1-57178-310-3.
