= St Barnabas Hospital =

St Barnabas Hospital may refer to:

- St Barnabas Hospital (Eastern Cape), South Africa
- St. Barnabas Hospital (Bronx), New York, U.S.
- Saint Barnabas Medical Center, Livingston, New Jersey, U.S.
- St. Barnabas's Hospital in Beijing, Beijing, China
- St. Barnabas' Hospital (Osaka), Japan
