= Barnaby Conrad =

American writer, artist, bullfighter, and boxer

- Born: Barnaby Conrad Jr. March 27, 1922; San Francisco, California, U.S.
- Died: February 12, 2013 (aged 90); Carpinteria, California, U.S.
- Education: University of North Carolina; National Autonomous University of Mexico; Yale University
- Occupations: Artist; author; nightclub proprietor; bullfighter; boxer

Barnaby Conrad Jr. (March 27, 1922 – February 12, 2013) was an American artist, author, nightclub proprietor, matador and boxer.

== Early life ==
Born in San Francisco, California, to an affluent family, Conrad was raised in Hillsborough. He spent a year at the Cate School in Carpinteria, California, before being sent east and graduating from the Taft School in Watertown, Connecticut, in the class of 1940.

He attended the University of North Carolina, where he was captain of the freshman boxing team. He also studied painting at the National Autonomous University of Mexico, where he also became interested in bullfighting. After being injured in the bullring, he returned to college and graduated from Yale University in 1943. He wanted to join the Navy after Yale, but his bullfighting injury prevented that.

== Career ==
After graduating, Conrad was hired as a code clerk at the State Department. Soon after, he was appointed American Vice Consul to Seville, Málaga, and Barcelona from 1943 to 1946. While in Spain, he studied bullfighting with Juan Belmonte, Manolete, and Carlos Arruza. In 1945 he appeared on the same program with Belmonte and was awarded the ears of the bull. He is the only American male to have fought in Spain, Mexico and Peru. After his stint in Spain, he moved for a time to Lima, Peru. He was known as "El Niño de California" ("The California Kid").

In 1947, he worked as secretary to famed novelist Sinclair Lewis. Conrad published his first novel, The Innocent Villa, in 1948. It largely went unnoticed, but his second novel, Matador, sold 3,000,000 copies.

John Steinbeck selected Conrad's Matador as his favorite book of the year, and the novel has been translated into 28 languages. Royalties from Matador provided Conrad with the capital to open El Matador nightclub in San Francisco in 1953. Herb Caen, noting that Matador was the publisher's suggested alternative to the original title Conrad had given his second novel, commented on Conrad naming his nightclub after his first best seller: "Who'd ever go eat at a restaurant called Day of Fear?" In 1997 Conrad wrote Name Dropping: Tales From My San Francisco Nightclub, "a jaunty account" about the 10 years he ran El Matador.

In 1958, Conrad was gored, almost fatally in a bullfight that was part of a charity event. After learning of the incident, Eva Gabor is said to have run into Noël Coward at Sardi's in New York and asked him, "Did you hear about poor Barnaby? He was terribly gored in Spain." Coward replied, "Oh, thank heavens. I thought you said he was bored."

Conrad served as a Golden Gate Awards juror at the 1959 San Francisco Film Festival. In 1965 he joined the Festival board and served for five years.

Conrad founded the Santa Barbara Writers Conference in 1973 at the Cate School, inviting such well-known authors as Eudora Welty, Gore Vidal, Joan Didion, and Ross Macdonald. He and his wife Mary directed the literary gathering until Conrad sold the conference in 2004. His son, Barnaby Conrad III, is also a San Francisco-based writer.

Conrad's charcoal portraits of Truman Capote, James Michener, and Alex Haley hang in the National Portrait Gallery in Washington, D.C. In 2006, the Spanish writer Salvador Gutiérrez Solís published his biography, Barnaby Conrad: A Spanish Passion (Fundación José Manuel Lara), which tells the story of Conrad's life in Spain and his connection with the world of bullfighting.

Ernest Hemingway, whose works inspired Conrad to undertake bullfighting and write Matador, deeply disliked Conrad and avoided meeting him despite several requests. In private letters, he called Conrad a "chickenshit" who embellished and misrepresented bullfighting.

== Death ==
Conrad died on February 12, 2013, at his home in Carpinteria, California. He had been in hospice care for three weeks. He was 90 years old.

== Works by Barnaby Conrad ==
=== Fiction ===
- Matador (1952; with illustrations by the author); 2nd edition (1988) Capra Press; ISBN 0-88496-286-5
- Zorro, a fox in the city (1971); ISBN 0-385-04149-7/ OCLC 153828
- Endangered (1978) with Niels Mortensen ISBN 0-399-12171-4
- OCLC 232653594 Condor (1978) with Niels Mortensen
- Keepers of the Secret (1983) with Nico Mastorakis; ISBN 978-0-515-05544-3
- The Last Boat to Cadiz (2003); ISBN 1-59266-032-0
- The Second Life of John Wilkes Booth (2010); ISBN 1-57178-225-7

=== Nonfiction ===
- La Fiesta Brava : The Art of the Bull Ring (1953), worldcat.org; OCLC 1349149
- The Death of Manolete (1958); ISBN 1-59777-548-7
- Gates of Fear (1958); Library of Congress Catalog #57-10110 https://www.amazon.com/GATES-OF-FEAR-exploits-bullrings/dp/B000HG830G
- Barnaby Conrad's Encyclopedia of Bullfighting (1961); OCLC 484064775
- Tahiti (1962)
- Fun While it Lasted (1969); ISBN 0-7181-0773-X
- A Revolting Transaction (1983); ISBN 0-87795-534-4
- Time Is All We Have: Four Weeks at the Betty Ford Center (1986); ISBN 0-87795-835-1
- Hemingway's Spain (1989); ISBN 0-87701-561-9
- Advice from the Masters: A Compendium for Writers (1991); ISBN 978-1-880093-01-6
- Name Dropping: Tales from my Barbary Coast Saloon (1994); ISBN 0-06-258507-X
- Learning to Write Fiction from the Masters (1996); ISBN 978-0-452-27657-4
- Name Dropping: Tales from my San Francisco Nightclub (1997); ISBN 0-9649701-4-7
- Snoopy's Guide to the Writing Life (2002; with Monte Schulz); ISBN 1-58297-194-3
- 101 Best Scenes ever Written: A Romp Through Literature for Writers and Readers (2006); ISBN 1-884956-56-4
- 101 Best Beginnings Ever Written: A Romp Through Literary Openings for Writers and Readers (2009); ISBN 1-884956-86-6

=== As editor, translator or contributor ===
- OCLC 84219226 The Wounds of Hunger (1957 translation of Más Cornadas da el Hambre by Luis Spota)
- OCLC 1576413 The second life of Captain Contreras (1960 translation of La Otra vida del Capitan Contreras)
- OCLC 1512811 My Life as a Matador The autobiography of Carlos Arruza (1956)
- The Complete Guide to Writing Fiction (1990) with the staff of the Santa Barbara Writers Conference; ISBN 0-89879-395-5
- "William Spratling" (1990) in Spratling Silver by Sandraline Cederwall and Hal Riney; ISBN 0-87701-845-6
- The World of Herb Caen: San Francisco, 1938-1997 (1997; with Carole Vernier); ISBN 0-8118-1859-4
- The World's Shortest Stories: Murder. Love. Horror. Suspense. All this and much more in the most amazing short stories ever written—each one just 55 words long! (2006) Steve Moss; ISBN 0-7624-0300-4

=== Famous "sports" quote ===
The famous quote "Only bullfighting, mountain climbing and auto racing are sports, the rest are merely games" can be attributed to Conrad, however Ernest Hemingway is often misidentified as the source.
