= St Barnabas Church and Cemetery, South Arm =

Historic site in Hobart, Australia

Coordinates: 43°00′56″S 147°24′59″E

St Barnabas
- The Church of Saint Barnabas, South Arm, Hobart
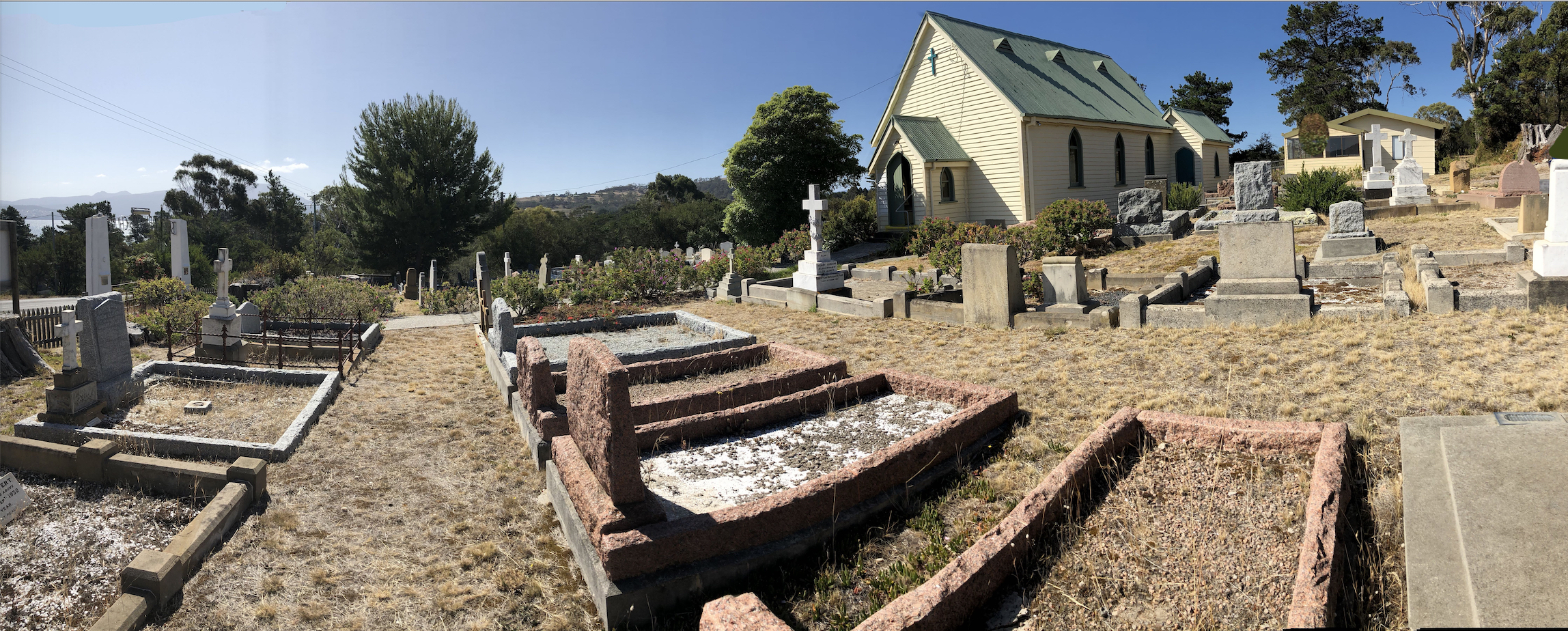
- Location: 3337 S Arm Rd, South Arm, Hobart 7022
- Country: Australia

History
- Founded: 1892

Architecture
- Architectural type: Victorian Carpenter Gothic Architecture
- Groundbreaking: 1892
- Completed: 1893

Specifications
- Length: 34 ft (10 m)
- Width: 22 ft (6.7 m)

Historic St Barnabas Church and Cemetery is located in Tasmania, Australia. Built on a hill that sits above Half Moon Bay, it overlooks the shipping lines and sailing regattas on the River Derwent. St Barnabas is the parish church in the outer Hobart suburb of South Arm.

== Early history ==
South Arm is located on a peninsula that is acknowledged as the traditional land of the Aboriginal Tasmanian Palawa people. The ancient middens in the area testify to their great affinity with the land.

== Founding of British colony and land grants ==
Tasmania was founded by the British as a convict colony in 1788. By 1804, land grants were given out to free settlers, to convicts whose sentences were completed, and to military personnel. The grants for Tasmania were managed from Sydney until just after Tasmania was separated from New South Wales in 1825.

== Settlement of South Arm peninsula ==
=== William Gellibrand (1765–1840) ===
William Gellibrand arrived in Hobart from England in 1824 and was appointed a Justice of the Peace. He received the first land grant of 2220 acres at Arm End along with ten convicts. He was known for the care and respect he gave his convict servants.

He provided them with a comfortable hut and clothing that did not distinguish them as prisoners. Thus, he gave them a fresh start, giving them the opportunity to raise families and contribute to the founding of the farm community at South Arm.

William built a large home on the northern end of the South Arm peninsula known as "Arm End". It was constructed of convict-made bricks on a stone foundation. He planted mulberry, walnut, chestnut and plum trees. His grave vault is still to be found at the former location of Spit Farm. As Attorney General of Tasmania, he managed to reform the legal system in the colony.

=== Land leases ===
When his grandfather died in 1840, George Henry Blake Gellibrand took over the land leases. In 1851 he offered land leases to Christopher Calvert, and also to other farmers as they moved into the area, and pardoned convicts, who were later able to purchase the farms they established. This important social change established a democratic way of life.

GHB Gellibrand built his home on the corner of Bezzants Rd, at the foot of the hill where St.Barnabas is situated today. The Rev Joseph Tice Gellibrand conducted church services in the open air and when the small Schoolhouse was built in 1854 he held the services in the school.

=== Farmers and orchardists ===
Small as they were in numbers, the settlers of South Arm achieved much. It was a period when many were trying to establish the farms and orchards throughout the district. Life would have been hard as much of the peninsula was still heavily covered with trees that had to be cleared before crops could be sowed. The Mercury reports from that time mention the names of well-known families that appear on several occasions, describing how the families lived and developed their farms to become the best on the peninsula, Travel was by the waterways around South Arm and most farmers had a small boat to transport the produce to Hobart.

The produce was also sent to Hobart markets by barges, and the only means of getting the produce onto the barges was by punts, which needed to be taken out a considerable distance. This caused several drownings and a request was made to build a pier. Some gravestones at St.Barnabas indicate these unfortunate untimely deaths.

These families still have some descendants living in the area. St.Barnabas was central in their lives. The South Arm community raised the money to build the church in 1893, and both the church and the Gellibrand Fellowship Hall have been in continuous use ever since.

=== Service at Musk Beach ===
On 17 December 1878, the Lord Bishop of Tasmania visited the Missionary Station of South Arm in the district of Clarence Plains for the purpose of holding a confirmation. On arriving at Musk Beach he was met by the Rev R. Wilson. The Mercury of the day discussed the lack of a clergyman in South Arm.

== Building of St Barnabas ==
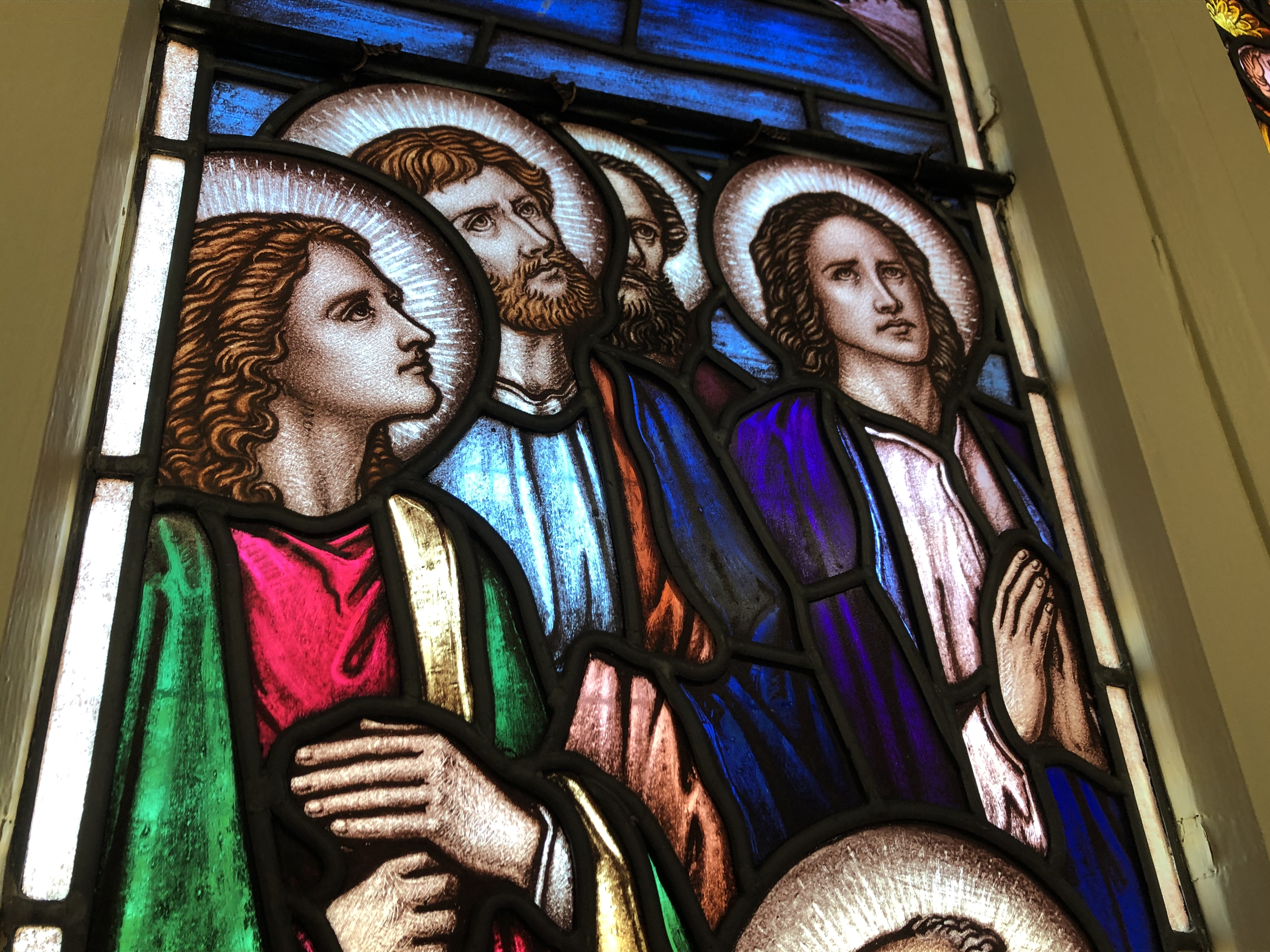
Stained glass window, donated by the Calverts

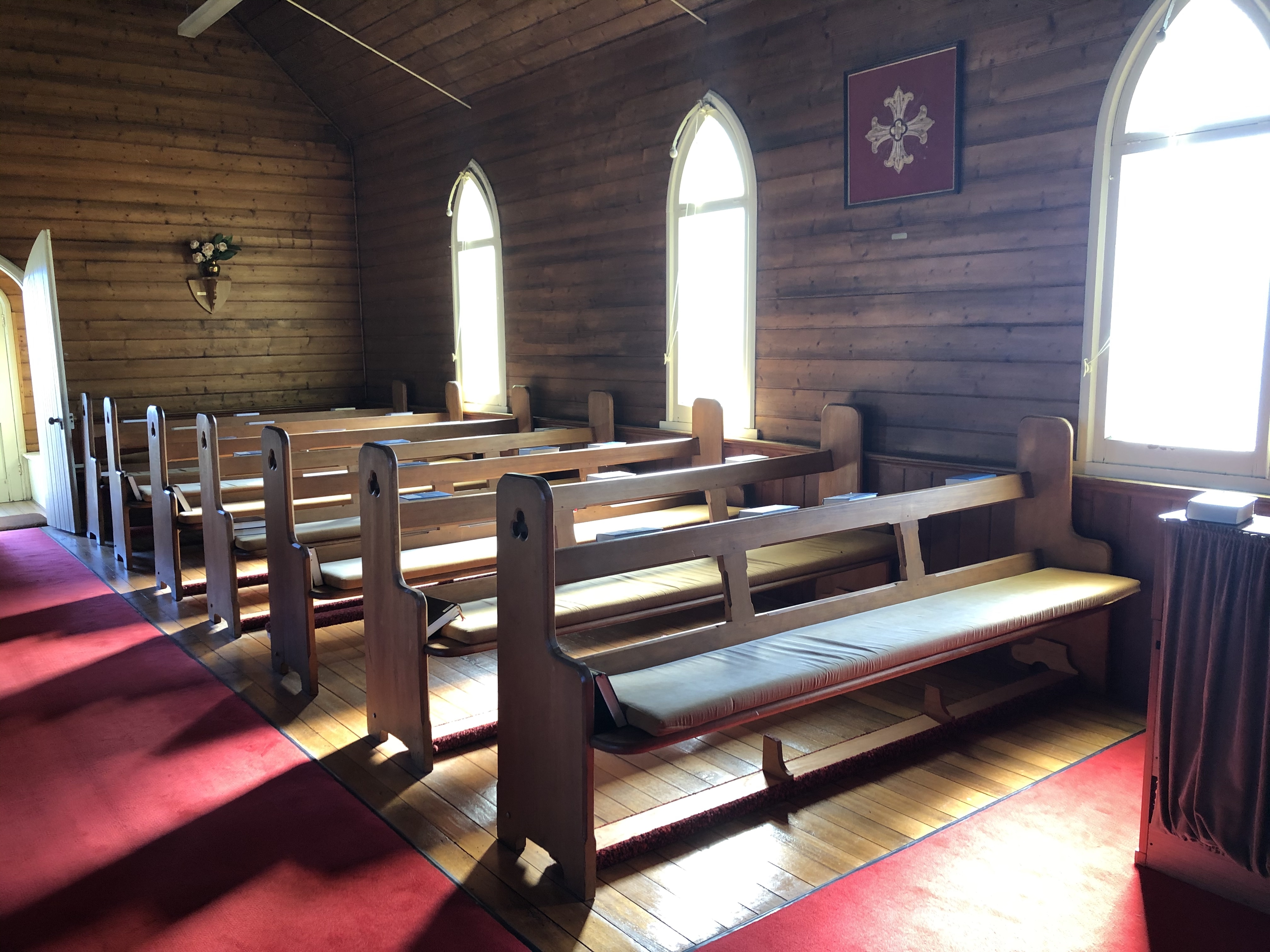
Original 1892 pews

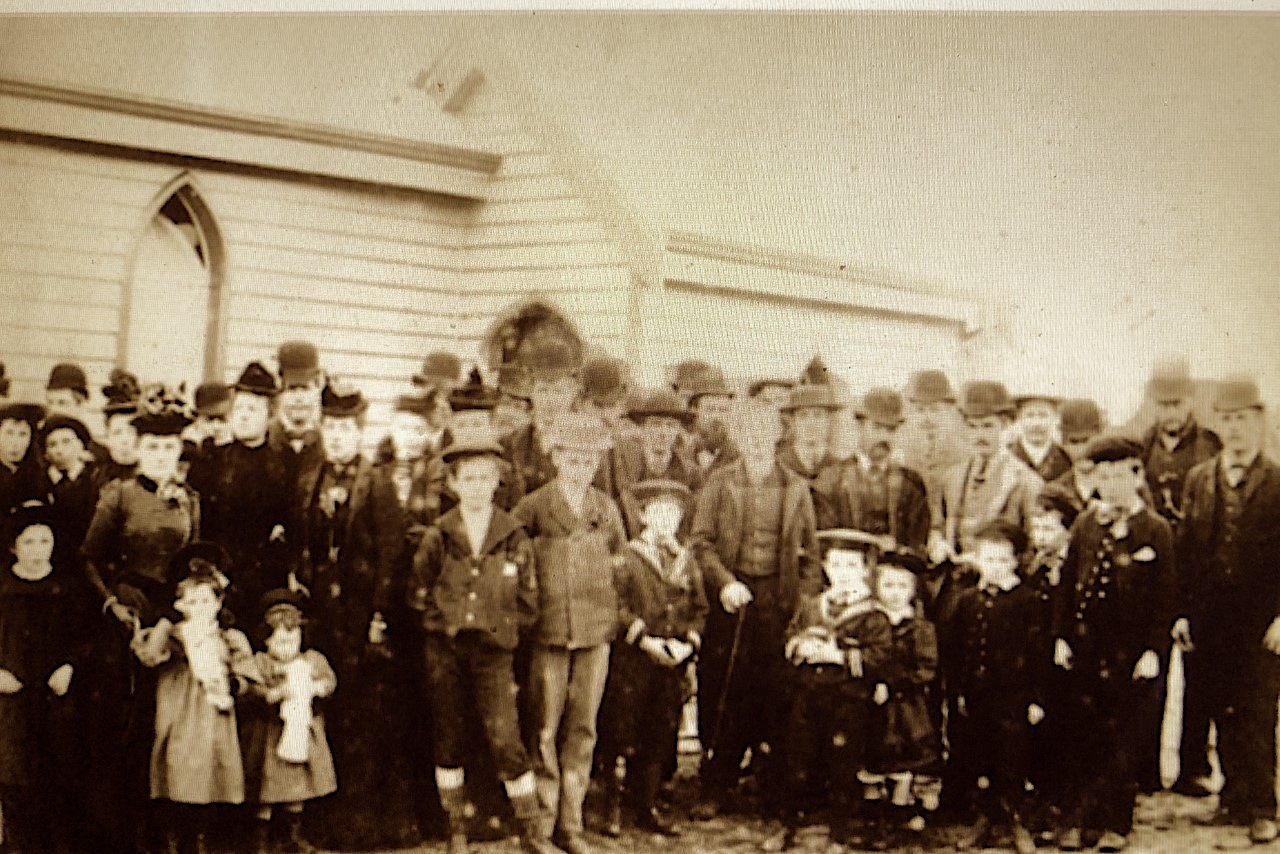
Dedication service, South Arm, 27 July 1892

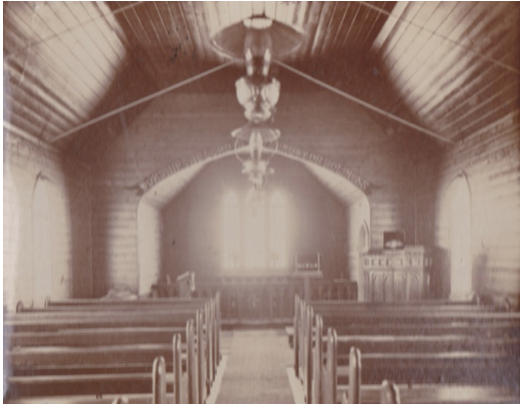
Two oil lamps hanging from ceiling, described (with a third not shown) by the Mercury as "mammoth lamps"

Initially burials of residents of South Arm were at Rokeby, across Ralphs Bay. In about 1851 founding families had donated the land for the cemetery and land was provided for a church.

Fundraising to build the church commenced in 1891 and continued until 1893. The Hobart Mercury of 17 September 1892 shows that the total amount collected from South Arm families who gave money to build the church was 272 pounds, 7 shillings, fourpence halfpenny.

=== Plan ===
The community banded together and came up with a plan to accomplish the work quickly. Following the construction of a stone house, now in Harmony Lane, there was no more stone available in the area. Money was raised for a ship to be chartered by the community to bring an entire cargo hull of strong Canadian pine to build the church and line the interior walls. The pine wood was hardwearing and some of the beams were 14 to 18 feet in length so they could build it quickly in the time they had. Some houses in the area are made from pine that was left over.

=== Dedication ===
The Mercury of 28 July 1892, Page 2 carried an article, "St Barnabas Church, South Arm Dedication Service":

The auspicious weather yesterday was all that could be desired for the service of dedicating the pretty and commodious church, just completed for the residents of South Arm to worship in. The steamer Huon left the wharf at about 1.20 p.m. filled with passengers from town, amongst who were the Dean of Hobart, Archdeacon Mason, and several other clergymen. The run down was extremely pleasant, the water being calm, with scarcely any wind, and the genial rays of the sun throughout heightened the enjoyment of the short trip. On arrival the visitors proceeded to the church, and the service commenced shortly afterwards, but although the building was crowded many were unable to gain admittance. The clergy who officiated were—The Dean of Hobart, Archdeacon Mason, Canon Finnis, and the Revs. C. R. Hall and R. Dixon. A form of special service, appropriate to the occasion, was used, and several hymns from Hymns Ancient and Modern were sung at intervals during the service, Mr A. MacIntyre presiding at the organ. The Dean offered up the prayer dedicating the church to the praise and glory of God, and afterwards delivered an extempore address, taking as his text the 22nd and following verses from the 11th chapter of the Acts of the Apostles, St. Barnabas being brought forth as an example well worthy of emulation. ... [H]e trusted that they would hold fast to the faith and continue all good works. The service was very heartily participated in by the large congregation, and a very liberal collection was made towards the close.

Tea was afterwards partaken of, provided by the ladies of the district, Miss Lillie Calvert and a bevy of fair waitresses assiduously attending to the wants of the numerous company. A sale of produce also took place, and many purchasers were readily found for such things as home-made bread, jams, jellies, made only as South Arm ladies can make them.

The church is a weatherboard building, 34ft. by 22ft., and built very substantially by Messrs. A. Tibbs and W. Jones, the architect being Mr Huckson. The interior is lined with pine and varnished, and over the chancel is placed the words, "Worship the Lord in the beauty of holiness," and "Holy, holy, holy" surmounts the window at the rear of the Communion table. The lighting has been well considered, three mammoth lamps, hung from the ceilling, will perform that duty adequately. The entrance door looks out upon Half-Moon Bay, and the picturesque surroundings pleasantly impress the visitor with the beauty of the scene. The committee entrusted with carrying out the building of the church are Rev. C. R. Hall, Messrs. J. Alomes, W. T. Calvert, J. Calvert, O. G. Morrisby, R. Calvert, and H. E. Alomes (secretary and treasurer). The ladies of the district must not be forgotten for the zealous part they performed in the work, as much of the success achieved is due to their efforts. Altogether everyone is to be congratulated upon the very satisfactory returns for their labour of love, and the district now possesses a building that will meet their spiritual needs for some time to come.

The return journey to town was enlivened by the singing of glees, rounds, etc., and a very enjoyable day was brought to a pleasant close shortly after 7 o'clock.

=== Consecration ===
The Mercury of Thursday 6 April 1893 featured news of the consecration of St Barnabas:

On Saturday afternoon some 120 people accompanied Bishop Montgomery in the S. S. Taranna to South Arm to assist in the ceremony of consecrating the new Church of England dedicated to St Barnabas. The incumbent Rev. C. Rhoden Hall was the only other Clergyman present.

The congregation filled the building and heartily joined in the services. Bellerive church choir led the singing, accompanied by the organ, at which Mr. A. McIntyre presided. A congratulatory and extortive address was delivered by the Bishop. Tea was provided in the cricket pavilion. Previously divine services were held in the State School room, but the new church will alleviate this and accommodate the population at South Arm for years to come.

It is erected on the ground used for many years for burials, and is constructed of timber. The building is 30 feet by 21 feet and the chancel 15 feet by 9 feet. Good lighting and ventilation has been provided with comfortable seats. A series of tasteful vestments were made and supplied by the Hobart Gentlewomen’s needle work guild of which Miss Mault is honorary secretary. A committee of ladies and gentlemen, with Miss Lilly Calvert and Mr H. E. Alomes as acting secretaries, began and completed the work of building the church. Generous help was given by all residents, Messrs. W. and R. Calvert lending 50 pounds without interest to permit the opening to take place free of debt. Messrs. Tibbs and W. Jones were the contractors, and Mr. R. Huckson gratuitously supplied the plans, Mr Watson of Hobart gave a pretty font.

== Cemetery ==
Burials had been carried out long before the construction of the church from the date on the headstone of Elizabeth Alomes.

The earliest burial at St Barnabas cemetery took place in 1858. Joseph Willmore was a convict granted land at Muddy Plains where he then established a farm. Blatherwick, Alomes and Musk family members were other early burials, and several others took place between 1865 and 1897.

=== War graves ===
There are several war graves dating from World War I and World War II.

In their honour, a commemorative Aleppo pine (Pinus halepensis) seedling from Gallipoli was planted, which has thrived at the northern corner of the cemetery.

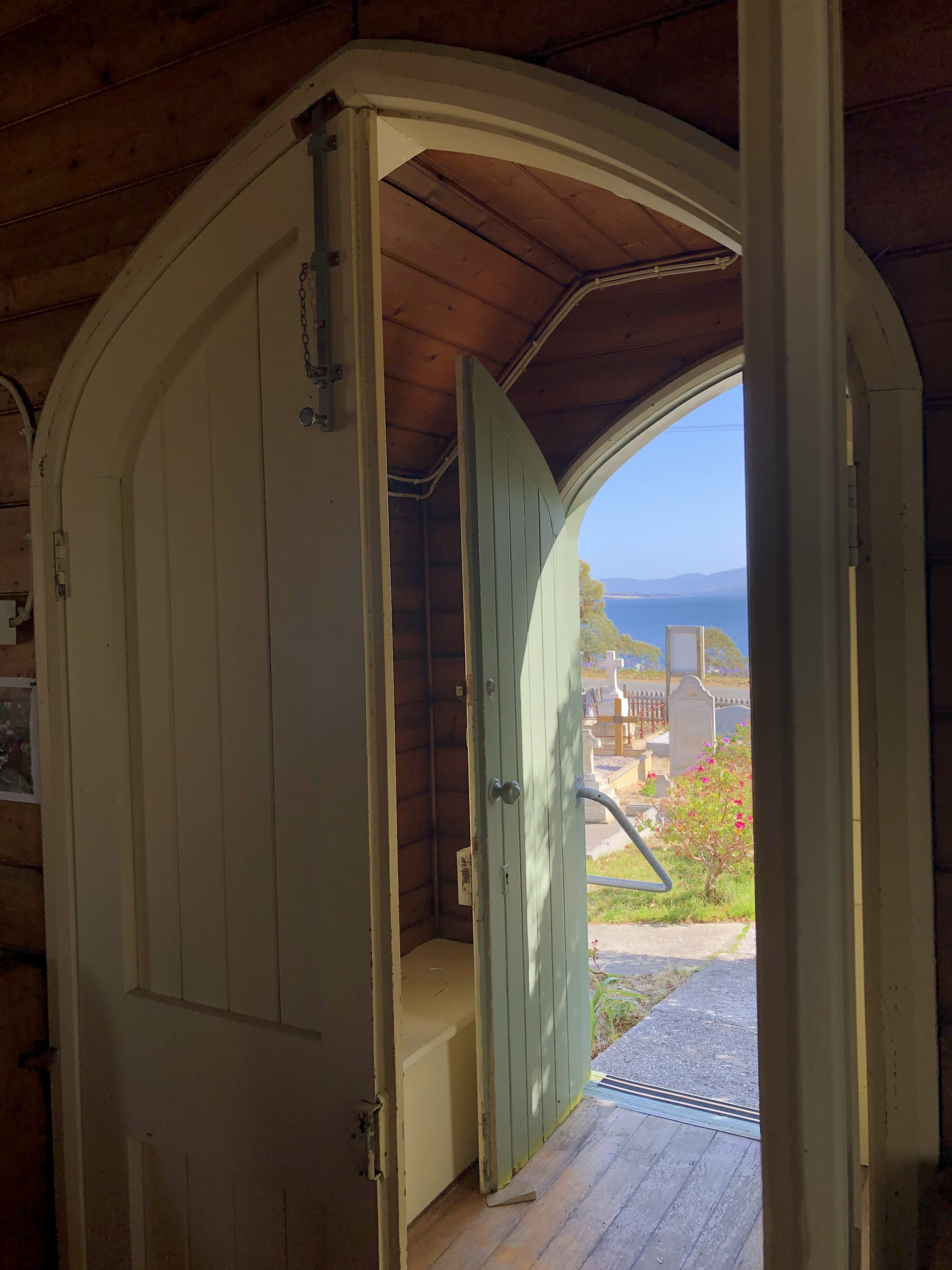
St Barnabas, South Arm, view from church door
