= SS Barnby =

A number of steamships were named Barnby, including –

- SS Barnby (1906), in service 1906–11, when wrecked
- SS Barnby (1918), in service 1946–52, scrapped as Mariandrea in 1953
- SS Barnby (1940), in service 1940–41, when torpedoed and sunk
