= St. Barnabas Episcopal Church (Montrose, Iowa) =

- U.S. National Register of Historic Places
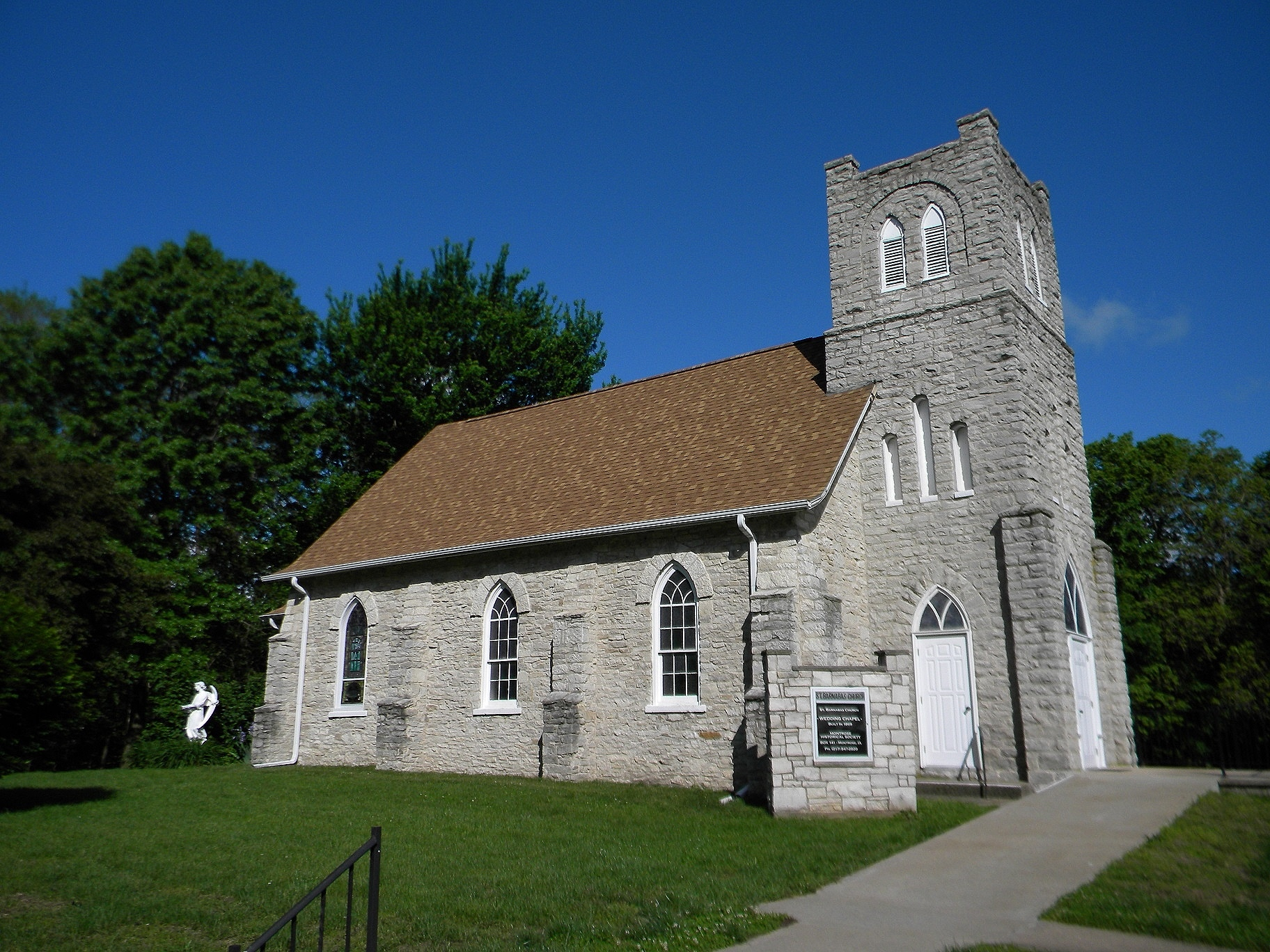

- Location within Iowa Location within the United States
- Location: Chestnut St. Montrose, Iowa
- Coordinates: 40°31′54″N 91°25′6″W
- Area: less than one acre
- Built: 1869-1871, c. 1902
- Architectural style: Gothic Revival
- NRHP reference No.: 86000721
- Added to NRHP: April 11, 1986

St. Barnabas Episcopal Church is a former church building in the Episcopal Diocese of Iowa in Montrose, Iowa, United States. It was listed on the National Register of Historic Places in 1986. The building is now called St. Barnabas Wedding Chapel.

== History ==
The congregation was founded as Grace Church and initially shared space with the local Methodist Episcopal Church. Land for the present church was secured in 1867 and funds were raised for the building. Construction began in 1869 and the main part of the sanctuary was completed in 1871. Local craftsmen built the church in blue-gray limestone, which was quarried 1 mile (1.6 km) away. Matthew Richardson, J.S. Lakin, and J.N. Ballou finished the interior, which included its furnishings. The name of the congregation was changed to St. Barnabas in 1881. The women of the parish raised the money for the bell tower and narthex, which were built c. 1902. A second-hand bell had been given by a St. Louis parish and hung on a frame structure at the Methodist Church until this tower was built. St. Barnabas was never a parish in its own right, but was a mission that was served from St. Luke's in Fort Madison or St. John's in Keokuk.

The church remained in use until it closed in 1960. An attempt was made to move the town library to the old church in 1974. The church was deconsecrated and some of its contents were given to active churches. The building was also vandalized and the churchyard was used to graze horses for a time. The old church sat empty until the Montrose Township Historical Society was formed in 1981 and began to restore it. In addition to serving as a wedding chapel, the facility hosts annual Memorial Day and Christmas programs.

== Architecture ==
The rectangular structure measures about 41 by 33 feet (12 by 10 m). There is a small chancel and vestry-room on the rear of the building. The bell tower, which gives the building a Norman Gothic appearance, rises to a height of 35 feet (11 m). The blue-gray limestone on the main body of the church is rough cut and irregularly coursed. The limestone on the tower is lighter in color and it is square cut, irregularly faced ashlar. The side elevations are three bays in length and each contain a lancet window. The bays are divided by stepped pilasters that are also located on the corners of the building. Three lancet windows are grouped together and are located on the back wall of the chancel. The original pews, two memorial windows, and the church bell are all that remain on the interior.
