= San Barnaba =

San Barnaba may refer to:

- San Barnaba, Milan, a church in Milan, Italy, the first edifice of the Barnabite order
- San Barnaba, Brescia, a church in Brescia, Italy
- San Barnaba, Florence, a church in Florence, Italy
- San Barnaba, Mantua, a church in Mantua, Italy
- San Barnaba, Modena, a church in Modena, Italy
- San Barnaba, Venice, a church in Venice, Italy

== See also ==
- Saint Barnabas (disambiguation)
