= Barnabas Root =

American missionary

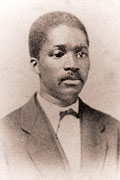
Rev. Barnabas Root (Fahma Yahny)

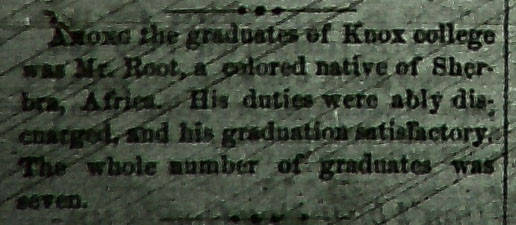
Newspaper announcement of Root's graduation from Knox College

Barnabas Root, born Fahma Yahny, (Sherbro Island, Sierra Leone, West Africa) was the grandson of an American-born slave who had moved to Africa through the efforts of the American Colonization Society. Yahny attended the original Mendi Mission school in Mendiland, Sierra Leone, where he was educated by Mary McIntosh, an alumna of Knox College, in Galesburg, Illinois, which was founded in the Calvinist tradition. The College and many of the Congregational churches of the city were active with the American Missionary Association.

Yahny was brought to the United States twice by alumni of the College, first in 1859, and then again in 1863, in the company of C. F. Winship, a missionary at the Mission, for a higher education at their alma mater. At that time Yahny took the name of the Illinois man who had organized the effort to pay for his education. Root was one of the first Black men to receive a college degree in Illinois, very likely the first.

Even in the strongly anti-slavery environment of Knox, though, Root was not shielded from prejudice. He was discouraged enough by what he faced that he considered transferring to Oberlin College in Ohio, which had been admitting African Americans for nearly thirty years by then.

Nevertheless, he decided to stay there, completing a bachelor's degree at Knox College in 1870. He was Knox's first "international" student and presumably its first Black male graduate, He went on to earn a Bachelor of Divinity at Chicago Theological Seminary in 1873. Root was then employed by the American Missionary Association as a lay pastor for a Congregational Mission Church for freedmen in Alabama.

Root determined to return to his native land to work as a missionary to his people. He was ordained on 8 November 1874 in the Broadway Tabernacle in New York City, a church long associated with the anti-slavery movement and then still active in missions around the world, especially Africa. The congregation had been prime supporters of the slaves from the ship La Amistad, who had been abducted from Sierra Leone.

Root returned to Sierra Leone immediately after his ordination, where he died of consumption in 1877.

== Sources ==
- Knox College Library Special Collections & Archives
