= Barnabás Tamás =

Hungarian politician

Member of the National Assembly
- In office 14 May 2010 – 5 May 2014

Personal details
- Born: 26 September 1952 (age 73) Putnok, Hungary
- Party: Fidesz
- Spouse: Gabriella Tuza
- Children: 2
- Profession: politician

Barnabás Tamás (born 26 September 1952) is a Hungarian politician, member of the National Assembly (MP) for Kazincbarcika (Borsod-Abaúj-Zemplén County Constituency VII) from 2010 to 2014. He was a member of the Defence and Internal Security Committee from 14 May 2010 to 5 May 2014, and of the Committee on Youth, Social, Family and Housing Affairs from 14 February 2011 to 5 May 2014.

Tamás has been the Mayor of Putnok since 1994.
