= Barnabus (disambiguation) =

Barnabus is an alternative spelling, or misspelling, of Barnabas.

Barnabus may also refer to:

- Barnabus, West Virginia, U.S.
- Barnabus "Barney" Stinson, a fictional character in How I Met Your Mother
- Barnabus Manchester, a British homelessness charity

== See also ==
- Barnabas (disambiguation)
- Barnabus Blossom House, a historic house in Fall River, Massachusetts
