= St Barnabas' Church, Mitcham =

Church in London

Coordinates: 51.4166°N 0.1579°W

St Barnabas' Church, Mitcham, is a church in the Graveney ward of the London borough of Merton, in SW London. It is located on Gorringe Park Avenue in Mitcham.

The church is dedicated to Barnabas, one of the disciples. In his day, he carried out missionary journeys & had a great ability to encourage - Barnabas means "son of encouragement". The dedication was chosen due to the missionary nature of the church set up on this site.

The local area in the early 20th century was a mission district (specifically, from 1906), where the church aimed to establish & foster a local religious community. This was at the aegis of Christ Church in Colliers Wood, along with old boys from City of London School.

The initial missionary building was a basic building, housing a single room; it was known as the "tin church". The current building that we know was designed by H. P. Burke Downing, the foundation stone being laid on 17 May 1913 & the church was completed on 14 November 1914. The church was Grade II listed by English Heritage on 2 September 1988.

No images of this early "tin church" are available, but we can ascertain how it might have looked with images of other churches which shared a similar arc of development, starting in newly populated areas in the greatly expanding cities of the late 1800s and early 1900s. Possible examples being the "tin hut" church at Mile Oak or the tabernacles of the Methodist Church

Recently, the church has been used as a polling station for elections; it was used as a polling office in UK General Election of 12 December 2019, with the polling booths and election officers being located near the main door.

== Gallery ==
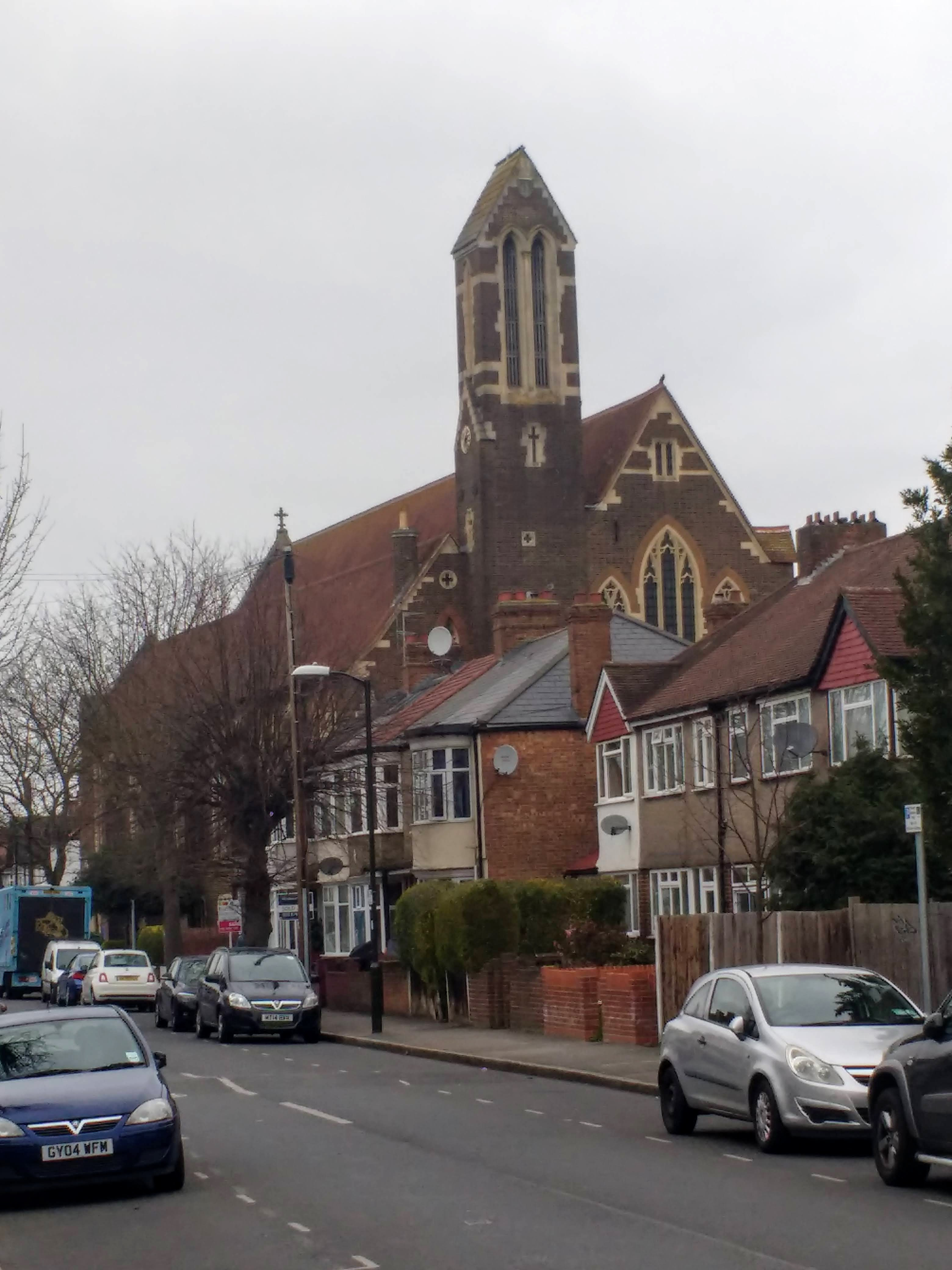

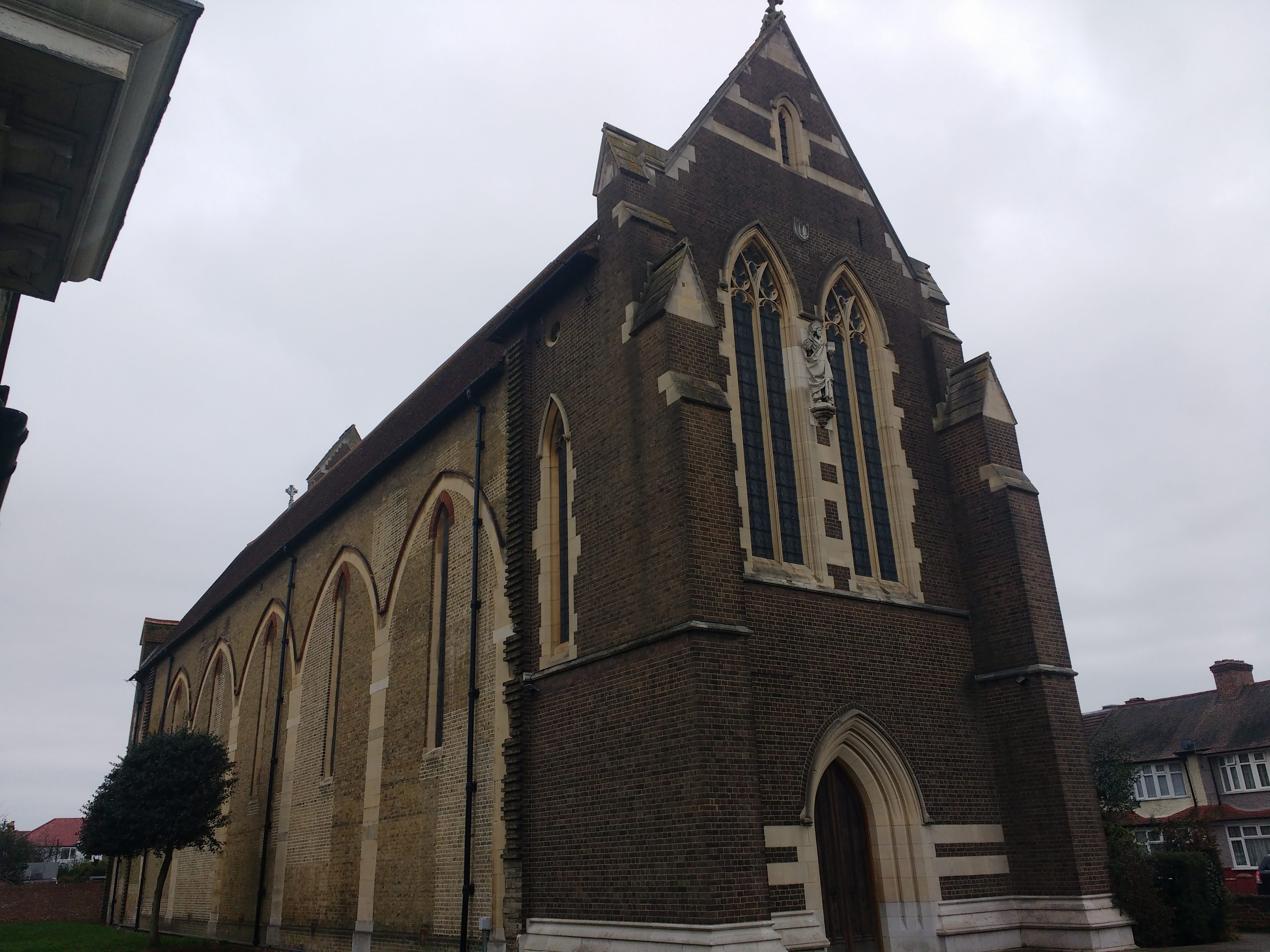

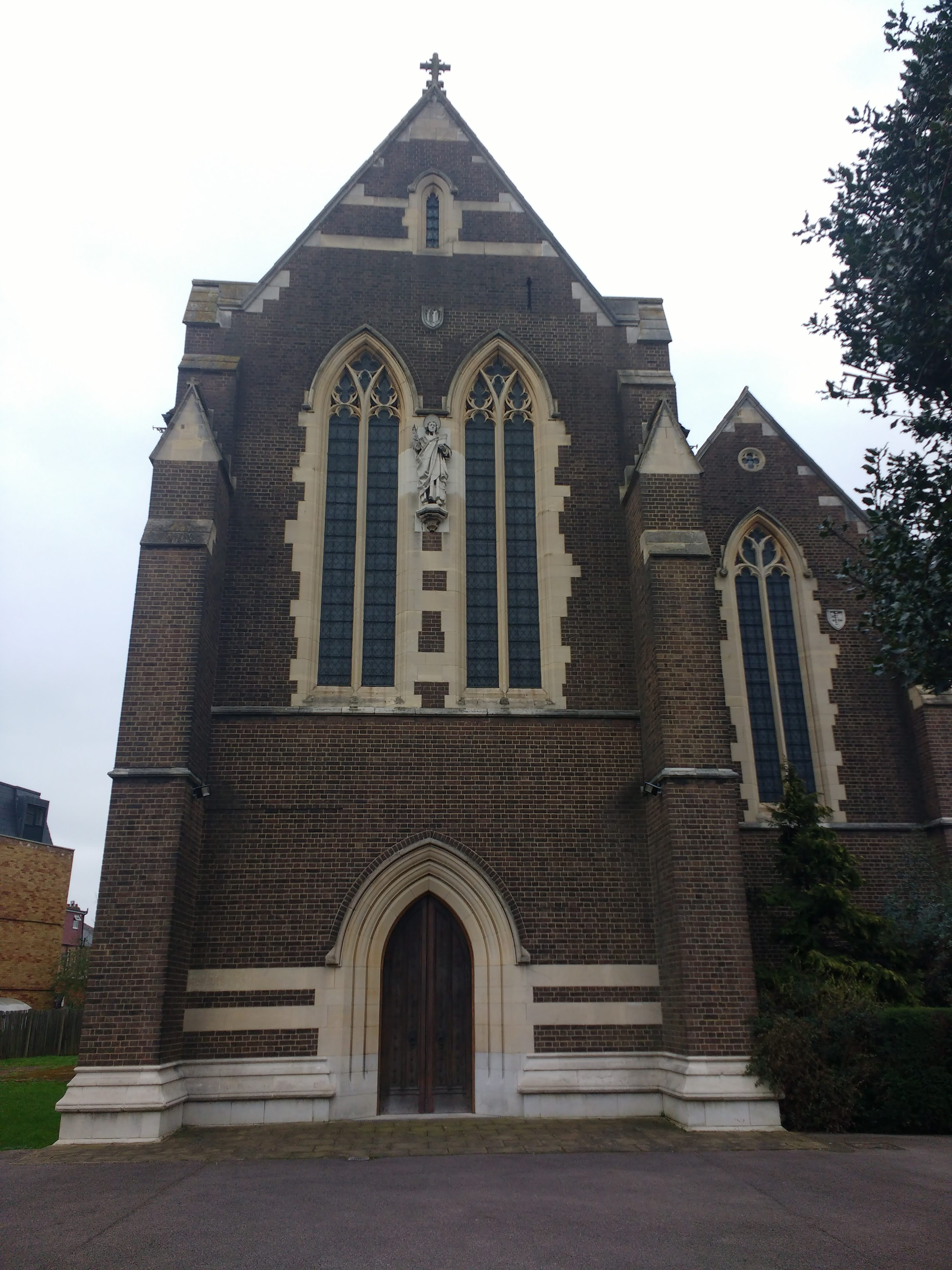
