= Searles Castle =

Searles Castle can refer to two buildings in the United States, named after designer Edward Francis Searles:

- Searles Castle (Massachusetts), completed in 1888, Great Barrington, Massachusetts
- Searles Castle (New Hampshire), completed in 1915, Windham, New Hampshire
