= Searles School and Chapel =

- U.S. National Register of Historic Places
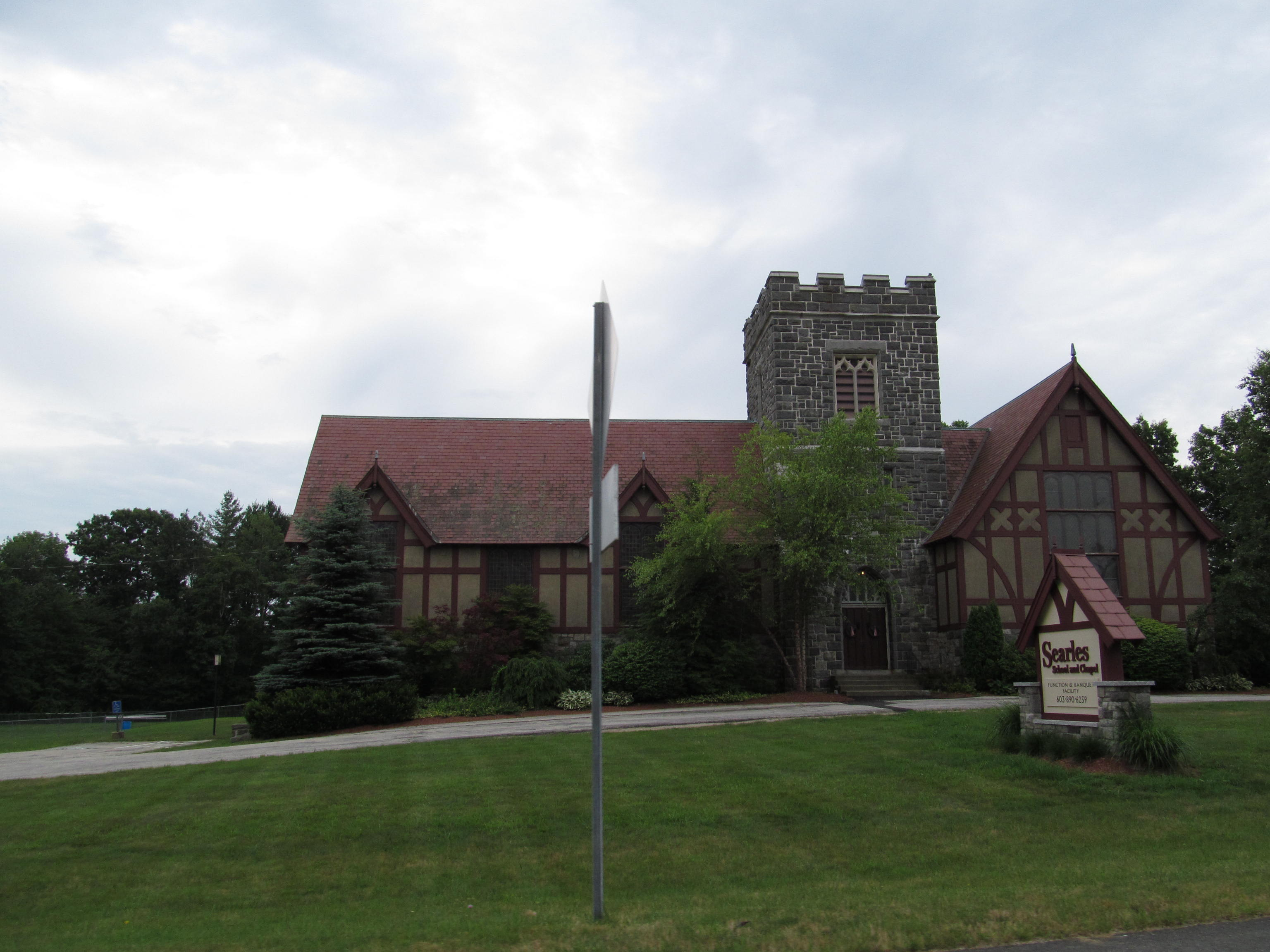

- Location within New Hampshire Location within the United States
- Location: Range and Searles Rds., Windham, New Hampshire
- Coordinates: 42°48′32″N 71°15′26″W
- Area: 4.7 acres (1.9 ha)
- Built: 1907–09
- Architect: Henry Vaughan
- NRHP reference No.: 82001694
- Added to NRHP: January 11, 1982

The Searles School and Chapel is located in Windham, New Hampshire, in the United States. Edward Francis Searles commissioned its design and construction, which began in 1907 and was completed in 1909. It was listed on the National Register of Historic Places on January 11, 1982.

== History and construction ==
Searles, a millionaire born nearby in Methuen, Massachusetts, acquired 1,300 acres (530 ha) of land in Windham after 1900 and hired architect Henry Vaughan to design a home, "Stanton Harcourt", now known as Searles Castle. Searles also sought to acquire a piece of land owned by the town of Windham, on which sat a rural district schoolhouse. Searles offered to exchange a nearby piece of land and to build a new school and chapel on it for the town. The cost of construction is not known but was rumored to be over $40,000.

== See also ==
- National Register of Historic Places listings in Rockingham County, New Hampshire
