= First Church Congregational =

Historic church in Massachusetts, United States

- U.S. National Register of Historic Places
- U.S. Historic district – Contributing property
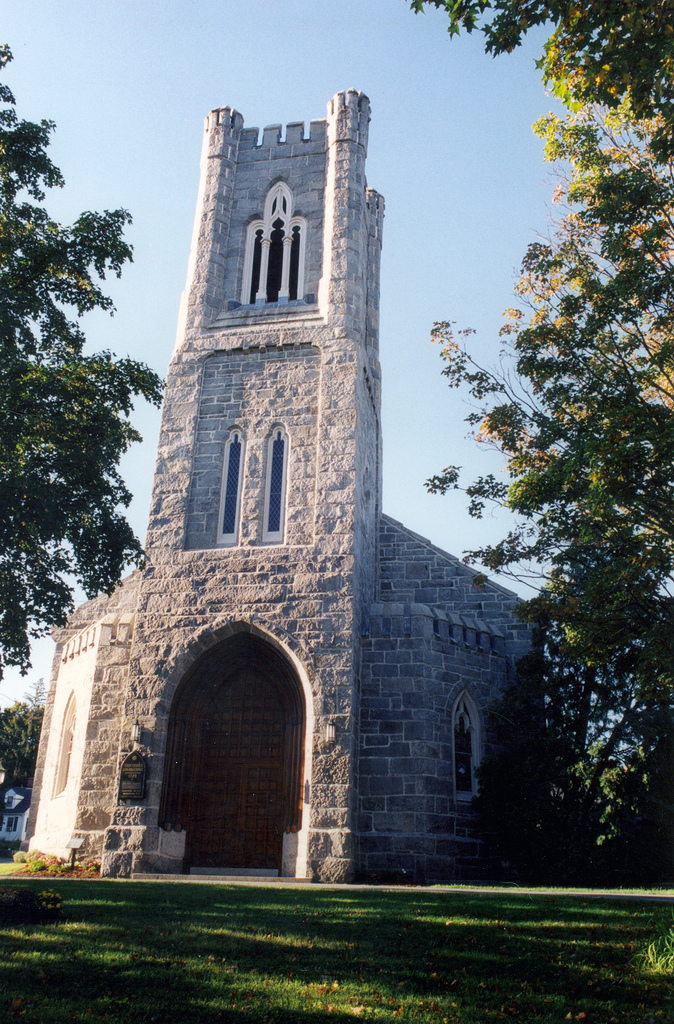

- Location within Massachusetts Location within the United States
- Location: Pleasant and Stevens Sts., Methuen, Massachusetts
- Coordinates: 42°43′46″N 71°11′8″W
- Area: 1.8 acres (0.73 ha)
- Built: 1855
- Architect: Heins & LaFarge
- Architectural style: Gothic Revival
- Part of: Pleasant-High Historic District (ID84002417)
- NRHP reference No.: 78000461

Significant dates
- Added to NRHP: December 1, 1978
- Designated CP: June 20, 1984

First Church Congregational is a historic church at Pleasant and Stevens Streets in Methuen, Massachusetts. The stone Gothic Revival structure was built in 1855 for Methuen's first congregation, established in 1729. Its first meeting house was on Daddy Frye's Hill, but moved to the present location in 1832. The present building features granite walls, a slate roof, and a tower with crenellated top and typical Gothic lancet windows. In 1895 the church installed a stained glass representation of Christ's Resurrection designed by John LaFarge.

The church was individually listed on the National Register of Historic Places in 1978, and included in the Pleasant-High Historic District in 1984. The current congregation is active in the United Church of Christ. The Rev. William D. Ingraham is its current Senior Pastor.

== See also ==
- National Register of Historic Places listings in Methuen, Massachusetts
- National Register of Historic Places listings in Essex County, Massachusetts
