= FIRST Stronghold =

2016 FIRST Robotics Competition game

- Year: 2016

Season Information
- Number of teams: 3,128
- Number of regionals: 53
- Number of district events: 73
- Championship location: The Dome at America's Center, St Louis, Missouri

FIRST Championship Awards
- Chairman's Award winner: 987 - "High Rollers"
- Woodie Flowers Award winner: Eric Stokely - Team 360
- Founder's Award winner: Charles Bolden/NASA
- Champions: 330 - "The Beach Bots"; 2481 - "Roboteers"; 120 - "Cleveland's Team"; 1086 - "Blue Cheese"

Links
- Website: Official website

FIRST Stronghold was the 2016 FIRST Robotics Competition game. The game was played by two alliances of up to three teams each, and involves breaching the opponents’ defenses, known as outer work as well as capturing their tower by first firing "boulders" (small foam balls) at it, and then surrounding or scaling the tower using a singular rung on the tower wall. Points were scored by crossing elements of the tower's outer works, shooting boulders into the opposing tower's five goals in order to lower the tower strength, and by surrounding and scaling the tower.

The name of the game was revealed on October 14, 2015 in a video that was produced with Walt Disney Imagineering. The details of the game were revealed at the kickoff event on January 9, 2016.

For this competition, the driver stations were split between the tower, with two driver stations to its left and one driver station to its right. Each team was given the option to display a team standard above the team's driver station. This standard was a small flag (made out of paper, cloth, or other flexible materials) and held up with a support structure built by the teams.

== Kickoff ==
The Kickoff event was held on January 9, 2016. The event was filmed at Searles Castle in Windham, New Hampshire and at Southern New Hampshire University in Manchester. The event was live-streamed on the Internet as well as being presented at regional kickoff events worldwide. The broadcast was built around a parody of Monty Python and the Holy Grail, reflecting the "storming the castle" theme of FIRST Stronghold.

== Field ==
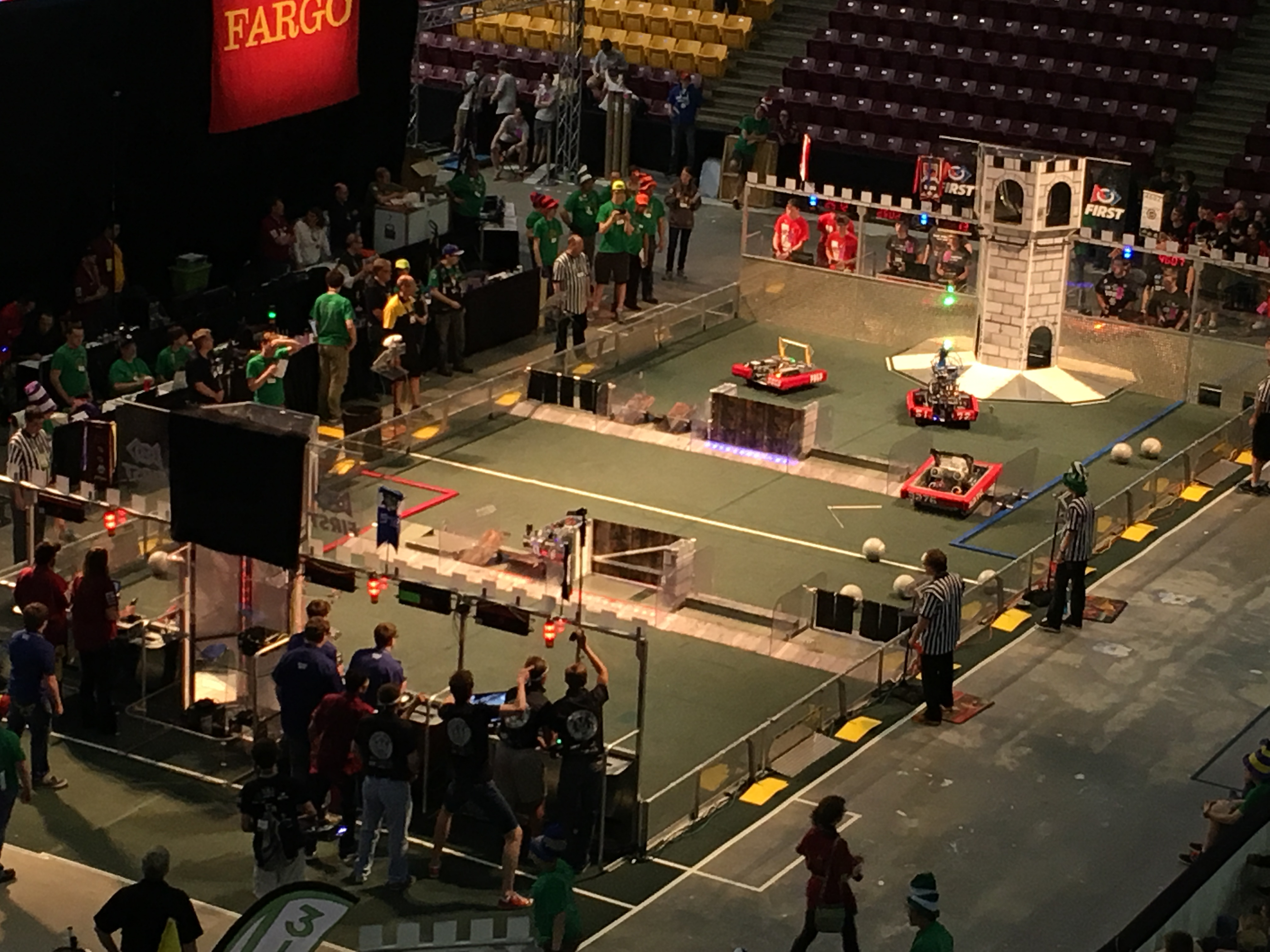
The FIRST Stronghold field

The playing field is divided into red and blue alliance sections, separated by a neutral zone that contains boulders. Each section contains a courtyard, an area for opposing teams to shoot boulders at the castle goals, a "secret passage" that allows human players to feed boulders to their robots from the human player station, the "outer works", and the tower.

=== Outer works ===
The outer works is the series of five defensive obstacles that divide the neutral zone from the alliance sections and span the field. Four of the five used obstacles are modular and can be moved, and certain obstacles may or may not be present during a match. Options for defensive obstacles include a cheval de frise, a "moat", ramparts, a drawbridge, a sally port, a portcullis, a rock wall, and "rough terrain". The defensive obstacle on the left of each outer works, the "low bar", is not movable. LED light strips at the base of each obstacle display current obstacle strength.

Three defensive obstacles of the outer works in a particular match are determined by the teams playing the match and one obstacle is chosen by the audience.

There are over 18,000 possible field configurations from the eight defensive options.

After problems with robots and boulders getting stuck in the fabric on the low bar, FIRST made the decision to have it replaced with rubber flaps at some events (including the Championship).

=== Tower ===
The tower consists of five scoring goals, three scaling rungs, and a "batter". Three high goals are 7 feet 1 inch above the playing field, and two low goals are six inches above the playing field. Three rungs for robots to scale the tower are 6 feet 4 inches from the playing field. Colored LED light strips on the front of the tower display the current tower strength. The "batter" is a series of seven 60° ramps at the base of the tower directly in front of the low goals designed to make challenging and scaling the tower difficult. The tower has a health of 8 for regional and district play and a health of 10 at the FIRST Championship.

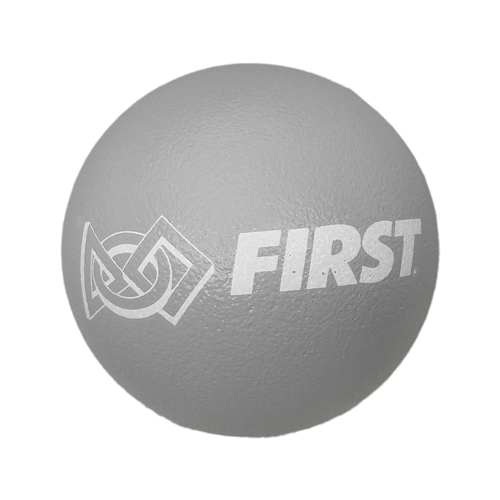
FIRST Stronghold 2016 boulder

=== Boulders ===
Scoring elements are called boulders, grey foam balls that are 10 inches in diameter. There are 12 boulders present on the field at the beginning of a match and 18 total. Six boulders are staged evenly along the mid line of the field, and three boulders are at each human player station and one in each robot.

== Game play and scoring ==
Stronghold is a medieval tower defense game in which two alliances of up to three teams each compete to score points by breaching the opponent's outer works and capturing the opponent's tower. Before the match, teams and the audience select defenses to fortify the alliance's outer works. Teams receive two ranking points in the competition standings for a win, and one ranking point for a tie.

Each match begins with a 15-second autonomous period where robots act on pre-programmed instructions. The match then transitions to a 2-minute and 15 second teleoperated (tele-op) period, where robots are driven by the drive teams.

=== Autonomous (auto) period ===
Robots begin in the neutral zone with the ability to hold one boulder each. However, alliances may assign a "spy" robot to start in the opposing alliance's courtyard. Alliances earn 2 points for reaching the opposing alliance's outer works, and earn 10 points for crossing them. Any additional defenses a robot crosses in auto will not decrease a defense's strength, or give points to the alliance. Once across a defense, a robot in autonomous mode can score a high goal for 10 points or low goal for 5 points.

=== Tele-operated (tele-op) period ===
Robots retrieve boulders from either their secret passage or the mid line, overcome opponent defenses, and score goals in their opponent's courtyard. Robots may transport only one boulder at a time. Each time a robot crosses an undamaged defense, they receive 5 points. Robots earn 5 points for scoring a high goal, and 2 points for a low goal. In the last 20 seconds of the match, robots race to the opposing alliance's tower to either park on the batter, earning them 5 points for a challenge, or hang from the tower's rungs, earning them 15 points for a scale.

== Special scoring ==
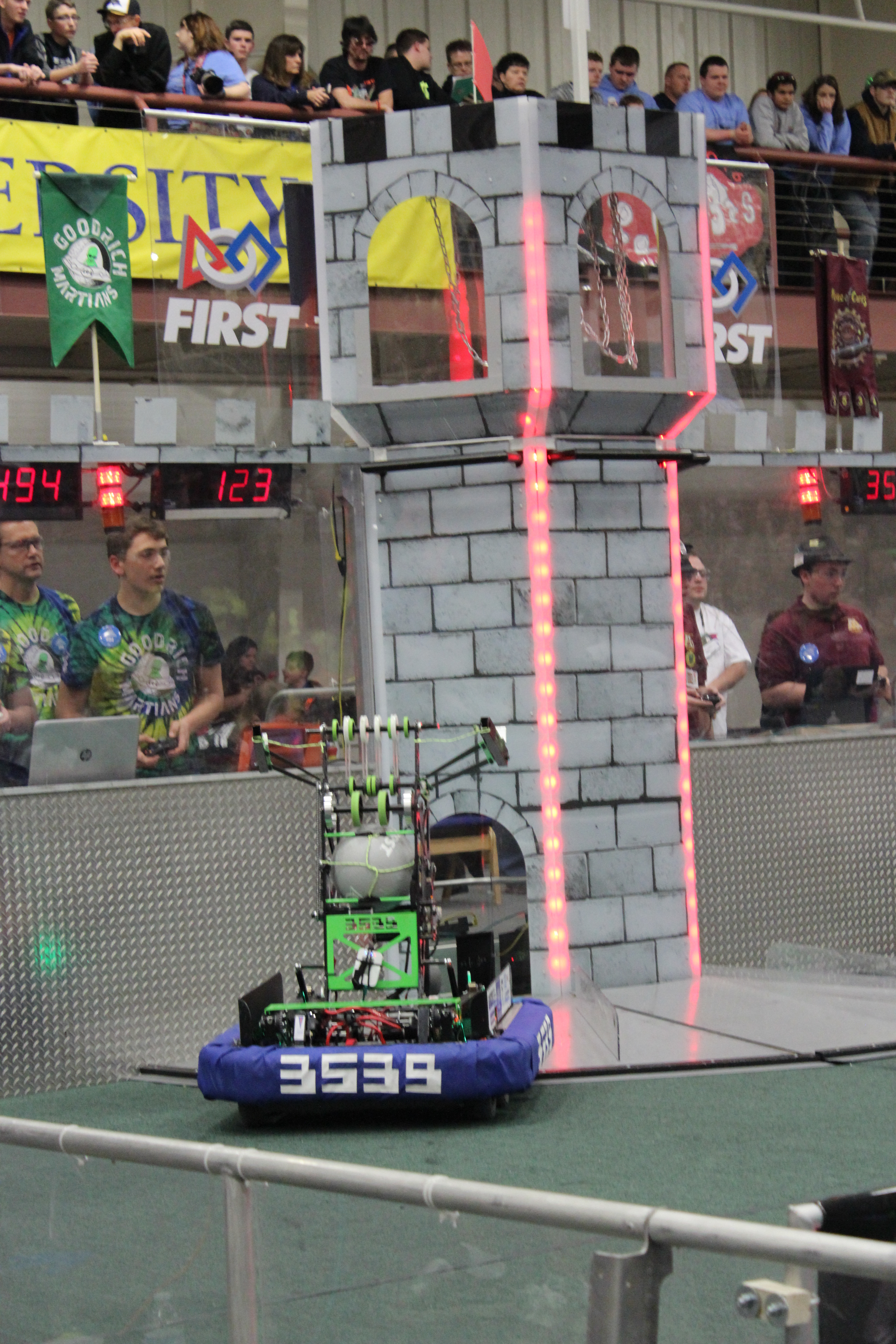
A robot getting ready to shoot a boulder into the high goal

There are opportunities to score additional points by completing certain tasks in FIRST Stronghold. This can be done through breaching and or capturing, and will award the alliance either ranking points in the qualification matches or regular points in the playoff matches.

=== Breach ===
Any time a robot successfully crosses one of the opponent's defenses (whether in autonomous or tele-op), that defense's strength is reduced by 1/2. The second time a robot crosses the defense, that defense's strength is reduced completely and is considered "damaged". Once four of the five defenses are damaged, the outer works are considered breached. A breach is awarded 1 ranking point in qualifications and 20 points in playoffs.

=== Capture ===
As goals are scored in the opposing alliance's tower, the tower's strength will be lowered. After 8 goals (high or low), or 10 goals at the World Championships, the tower has no strength and is considered "weakened". Only a weakened tower can be captured. To capture a tower, all robots in the alliance must either drive onto the opposing team's batter, or scale the tower. Once the capture has been declared, the tower will turn to the capturing alliance's color, and their flag will be raised. For capturing, the alliance receives 1 ranking point in qualifications, and 25 points in the playoffs.

== Events ==
=== Week 0.5 ===
Event	Dates
Palmetto Regional	Feb 24 – 27, 2016

=== Week 1 ===
Event	Dates
Greater Toronto Central Regional	Mar 2 – 5, 2016
San Diego Regional	Mar 2 – 5, 2016
Lake Superior Regional	Mar 2 – 5, 2016
Northern Lights Regional	Mar 2 – 5, 2016
Kettering University District Event #1	Mar 3 – 6, 2016
Southfield District Event	Mar 3 – 6, 2016
Standish-Sterling District Event	Mar 3 – 6, 2016
Waterford District Event	Mar 3 – 6, 2016
Auburn Mountainview District Event	Mar 3 – 6, 2016
West Valley District Event	Mar 3 – 6, 2016
Waterbury District Event	Mar 3 – 6, 2016
Guilford County District Event	Mar 4 – 6, 2016
Granite State District Event	Mar 4 – 6, 2016
Mt. Olive District Event	Mar 4 – 6, 2016
Hatboro-Horsham District Event	Mar 4 – 6, 2016
Northern Virginia District Event	Mar 4 – 6, 2016

=== Week 2 ===
Event	Dates
Israel Regional	Mar 8 – 10, 2016
Greater Toronto East Regional	Mar 9 – 12, 2016
Mexico City Regional	Mar 9 – 12, 2016
Arkansas Rock City Regional	Mar 9 – 12, 2016
Arizona North Regional	Mar 9 – 12, 2016
Los Angeles Regional	Mar 9 – 12, 2016
Orlando Regional	Mar 9 – 12, 2016
Greater Kansas City Regional	Mar 9 – 12, 2016
St. Louis Regional	Mar 9 – 12, 2016
Greater Pittsburgh Regional	Mar 9 – 12, 2016
Alamo Regional	Mar 9 – 12, 2016
Central Valley Regional	Mar 10 – 13, 2016
New York City Regional	Mar 10 – 13, 2016
Columbus District Event	Mar 10 – 12, 2016
Kettering University District Event #2	Mar 10 – 12, 2016
Gull Lake District Event	Mar 10 – 12, 2016
St. Joseph District Event	Mar 10 – 12, 2016
Wilsonville District Event	Mar 10 – 12, 2016
Tippecanoe District Event	Mar 11 – 13, 2016
North Shore District Event	Mar 11 – 13, 2016
Worcester Polytechnic Institute District Event	Mar 11 – 13, 2016
Greater D.C. District Event	Mar 11 – 13, 2016
Wake County District Event	Mar 11 – 13, 2016
Southwest Virginia District Event	Mar 11 – 13, 2016
Glacier Peak District Event	Mar 11 – 13, 2016

=== Week 3 ===
Event	Dates
Australia Regional	Mar 16 – 19, 2016
Central Illinois Regional	Mar 16 – 19, 2016
Bayou Regional	Mar 16 – 19, 2016
New York Tech Valley Regional	Mar 16 – 19, 2016
Buckeye Regional	Mar 16 – 19, 2016
Utah Regional	Mar 16 – 19, 2016
Albany District Event	Mar 17 – 19, 2016
Dalton District Event	Mar 17 – 19, 2016
Center Line District Event	Mar 17 – 19, 2016
Escanaba District Event	Mar 17 – 19, 2016
Midland District Event	Mar 17 – 19, 2016
Central Washington University District Event	Mar 17 – 19, 2016
Walker Warren District Event	Mar 18 – 20, 2016
UMass-Dartmouth District Event	Mar 18 – 20, 2016
Northern Maryland District Event	Mar 18 – 20, 2016
UNC Asheville District Event	Mar 18 – 20, 2016
Seneca District Event	Mar 18 – 20, 2016
Springside Chestnut Hill District Event	Mar 18 – 20, 2016
Hampton Roads District Event	Mar 18 – 20, 2016
Mount Vernon District Event	Mar 18 – 20, 2016

=== Week 4 ===
Event	Dates
North Bay Regional	Mar 23 – 26, 2016
Rocket City Regional	Mar 23 – 26, 2016
Sacramento Regional	Mar 23 – 26, 2016
Ventura Regional	Mar 23 – 26, 2016
Colorado Regional	Mar 23 – 26, 2016
Iowa Regional	Mar 23 – 26, 2016
Finger Lakes Regional	Mar 23 – 26, 2016
Oklahoma Regional	Mar 23 – 26, 2016
Dallas Regional	Mar 23 – 26, 2016
Wisconsin Regional	Mar 23 – 26, 2016
Perry Meridian District Event	Mar 24 – 26, 2016
Central Maryland District Event	Mar 24 – 26, 2016
West Michigan District Event	Mar 24 – 26, 2016
Livonia District Event	Mar 24 – 26, 2016
Maryville District Event	Mar 24 – 26, 2016
Lansing District Event	Mar 24 – 26, 2016
UNH District Event	Mar 24 – 26, 2016
Philomath District Event	Mar 24 – 26, 2016
Rhode Island District Event	Mar 24 – 26, 2016
Central Virginia District Event	Mar 24 – 26, 2016

=== Week 5 ===
Event	Dates
Waterloo Regional	Mar 30 – April 2, 2016
Montreal Regional	Mar 30 – April 2, 2016
Orange County Regional	Mar 30 – April 2, 2016
South Florida Regional	Mar 30 – April 2, 2016
Hawaii Regional	Mar 30 – April 2, 2016
Idaho Regional	Mar 30 – April 2, 2016
Midwest Regional	Mar 30 – April 2, 2016
Las Vegas Regional	Mar 30 – April 2, 2016
SBPLI Long Island Regional	Mar 30 – April 2, 2016
Queen City Regional	Mar 30 – April 2, 2016
Smoky Mountains Regional	Mar 30 – April 2, 2016
Hub City Regional	Mar 31 – April 3, 2016
Howell District Event	Mar 31 – April 2, 2016
Lake Superior State University District Event	Mar 31 – April 2, 2016
East Kentwood District Event	Mar 31 – April 2, 2016
Troy District Event	Mar 31 – April 2, 2016
Clackamas Academy of Industrial Science; District Event	Mar 31 – April 2, 2016
Hartford District Event	Apr 1 – 3, 2016
Boston District Event	Apr 1 – 3, 2016
Campbell University/ Johnson Community College District Event	Apr 1 – 3, 2016
Bridgewater-RaritanDistrict Event	Apr 1 – 3, 2016
Westtown District Event	Apr 1 – 3, 2016
Auburn District Event	Apr 1 – 3, 2016
Western Canada Regional	Apr 3 – 6, 2016

=== Week 6 ===
Event	Dates
Windsor Essex Great Lakes Regional	Apr 6 – 9, 2016
Arizona West Regional	Apr 6 – 9, 2016
Silicon Valley Regional	Apr 6 – 9, 2016
Minnesota 10000 Lakes Regional	Apr 6 – 9, 2016
Minnesota North Star Regional	Apr 6 – 9, 2016
Lone Star Regional	Apr 6 – 9, 2016
FIRST Chesapeake District Championship	Apr 6 – 9, 2016
Pacific Northwest District Championship	Apr 6 – 9, 2016
Pine Tree District Event	Apr 7 – 9, 2016
Woodhaven District Event	Apr 7 – 9, 2016
Traverse City District Event	Apr 7 – 9, 2016
NC FIRST Robotics State Championship	Apr 8 – 10, 2016
Kennesaw District Event	Apr 8 – 10, 2016
Montgomery District Event	Apr 8 – 10, 2016

=== Week 7 ===
Event	Dates
New England District Championship	Apr 13 – 16, 2016
Indiana State Championship	Apr 13 – 16, 2016
Michigan State Championship	Apr 13 – 16, 2016
Mid-Atlantic Robotics District Championship	Apr 13 – 16, 2016
Peachtree District State Championship	Apr 14 – 17, 2016

=== World Championship ===
Event	Location	Dates
FIRST Robotics World Championship	St. Louis, Missouri	Apr 27 – 30, 2016
