= William Sheldon =

William Sheldon may refer to:

- William Sheldon (died 1570), MP for Worcestershire (UK Parliament constituency)
- William Wallace Barbour Sheldon (1836–1915), American architect
- William B. Sheldon (1805-1847), American politician and lawyer
- William Herbert Sheldon (1898–1977), American psychologist
- William Sheldon (Irish politician) (1907–1999), Irish Clann na Talmhan/Independent politician
