= Timothy Hopkins =

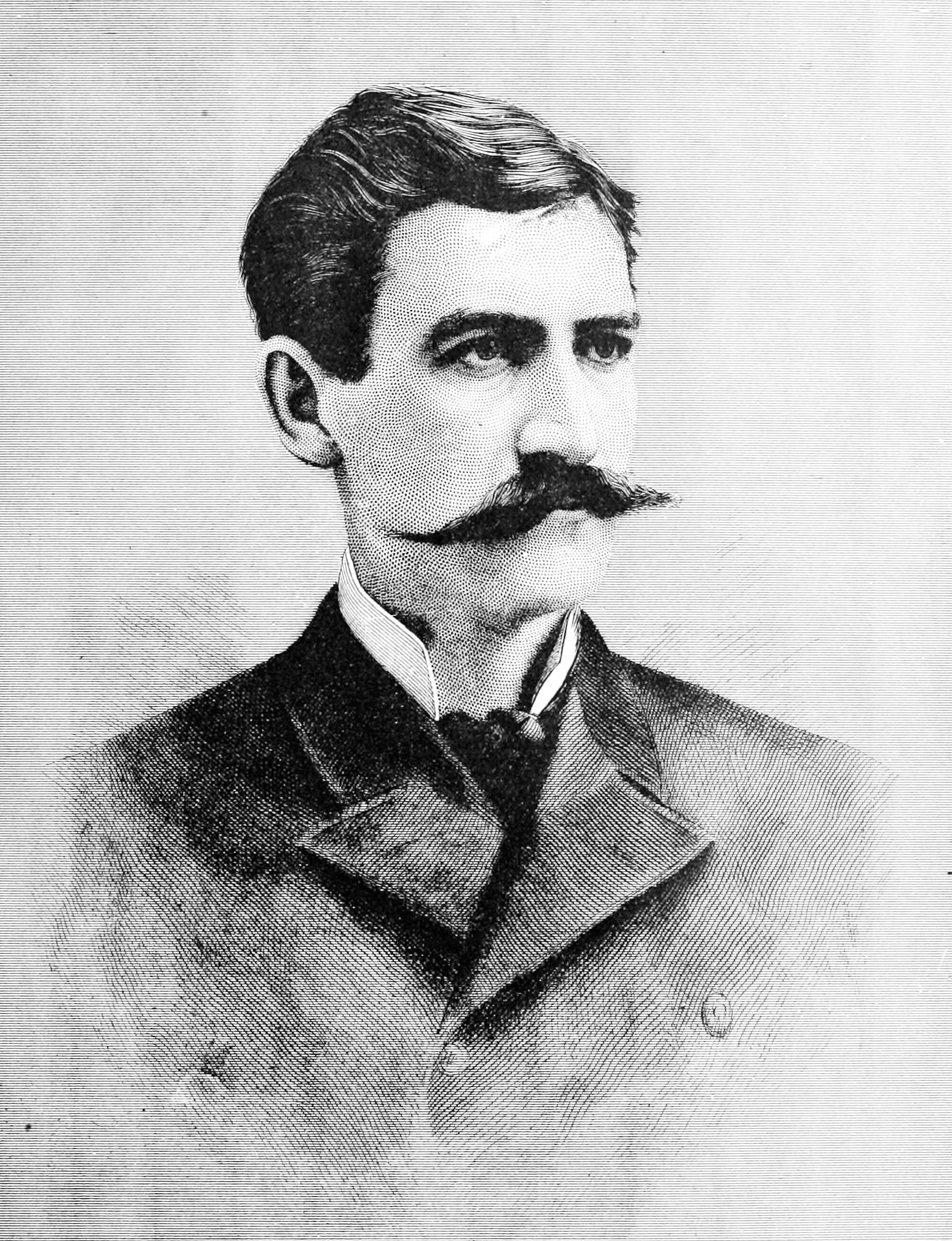
- 1889 portrait
- Born: Timothy Nolan; March 2, 1859; Augusta, Maine, US
- Died: January 1, 1936 (aged 76); San Francisco, California, US

Timothy Hopkins (1859 – 1 January 1936) was the adopted son of Central Pacific Railroad co-owner Mark Hopkins' widow, Mary Hopkins, and friend of another co-owner Leland Stanford and his wife, Jane. He was one of the founders of Palo Alto and a trustee of Stanford University for over 50 years. His estate is now the site of the Menlo Park Civic Center and of SRI International.

== Biography ==
=== Early life ===
Timothy Hopkins was born Timothy Nolan in Augusta, Maine on March 2, 1859, to Irish immigrants, Patrick and Catherine Nolan. In 1862 his father moved west to California and once established sent for his family; however, he drowned before they arrived. His mother went to work in the home of the childless Hopkins family who treated Timothy as the child they did not have. In 1869 Catharine Nolan remarried and left the Hopkins family with her elder son Thomas but leaving Timothy with the Hopkins. The Hopkins intended to send him to Harvard University but Mark Hopkins' death without a will in 1878 changed things. Timothy Hopkins took over much of the financial management of the estate and in 1879 was legally adopted by Mary Hopkins. He eventually became treasurer of the Southern Pacific Railroad successor of the Central Pacific.

=== Career ===
Timothy Hopkins married Mary Kellogg Crittenden, a niece of Mary Hopkins, in 1882 and were given a 280-acre estate, Sherwood Hall, formerly the Thurlow estate, in Menlo Park (bounded by Ravenswood road, Middlefield road, San Francisquito Creek and the Caltrain railroad tracks); though they also lived in San Francisco. Across the creek and a little way upstream was the country estate of Leland and Jane Stanford, the future site of Stanford University.

In 1884 Leland and Jane Stanford's only child, also Leland, died and in 1885 they named a board of trustees including 26 year old Timothy Hopkins for their proposed university in memory of their son though the university was not to be opened until 1891. Hopkins was to serve as a trustee until his death in 1936 and was president of the Board of Trustees from 1908–1914. Hopkins, with the Stanfords' support, purchased 737 acres in what is now the area of Palo Alto around University avenue and in 1887 laid out the plans for a new town, initially called University Park; in 1892 that town became Palo Alto. Lots were sold but under a covenant that forbade the sale of alcoholic beverages and a railroad station was built to serve the new university (Mayfield, a community just to the south with an already existing station was well known for its drinking establishments and the Stanfords wanted a dry town associated with the university). The covenant lasted until 1970.

In 1887 his adopted mother, Mary Hopkins, married her interior decorator, Edward Francis Searles, and when she died in 1891 her will explicitly disinherited Timothy Hopkins and left her fortune to her new husband. The will was challenged and though the husband eventually won, Timothy was given several million dollars.

In 1892 Hopkins provided the funding to establish the Hopkins Seaside Laboratory on the Monterey Peninsula for the just opened Stanford University. It was moved a short distance and renamed the Hopkins Marine Station in 1917. He and his wife were also involved in the founding of the Stanford Home for Convalescent Children which is one of the forebears of the Lucile Packard Children's Hospital.

== Death and legacy ==
He died on New Years Day 1936 of pneumonia in Stanford Hospital, then located in San Francisco, and was buried on January 3 at Cypress Lawn Memorial Park. The honorary pall bearers at his funeral included president Ray Lyman Wilbur of Stanford University and former US president Herbert Hoover. Timothy Hopkins' will gave his widow a lifetime use of his estate and at her death in 1941 most of it went to Stanford University. They had one child, Lydia (1887–1965).

== Geography Named for him ==
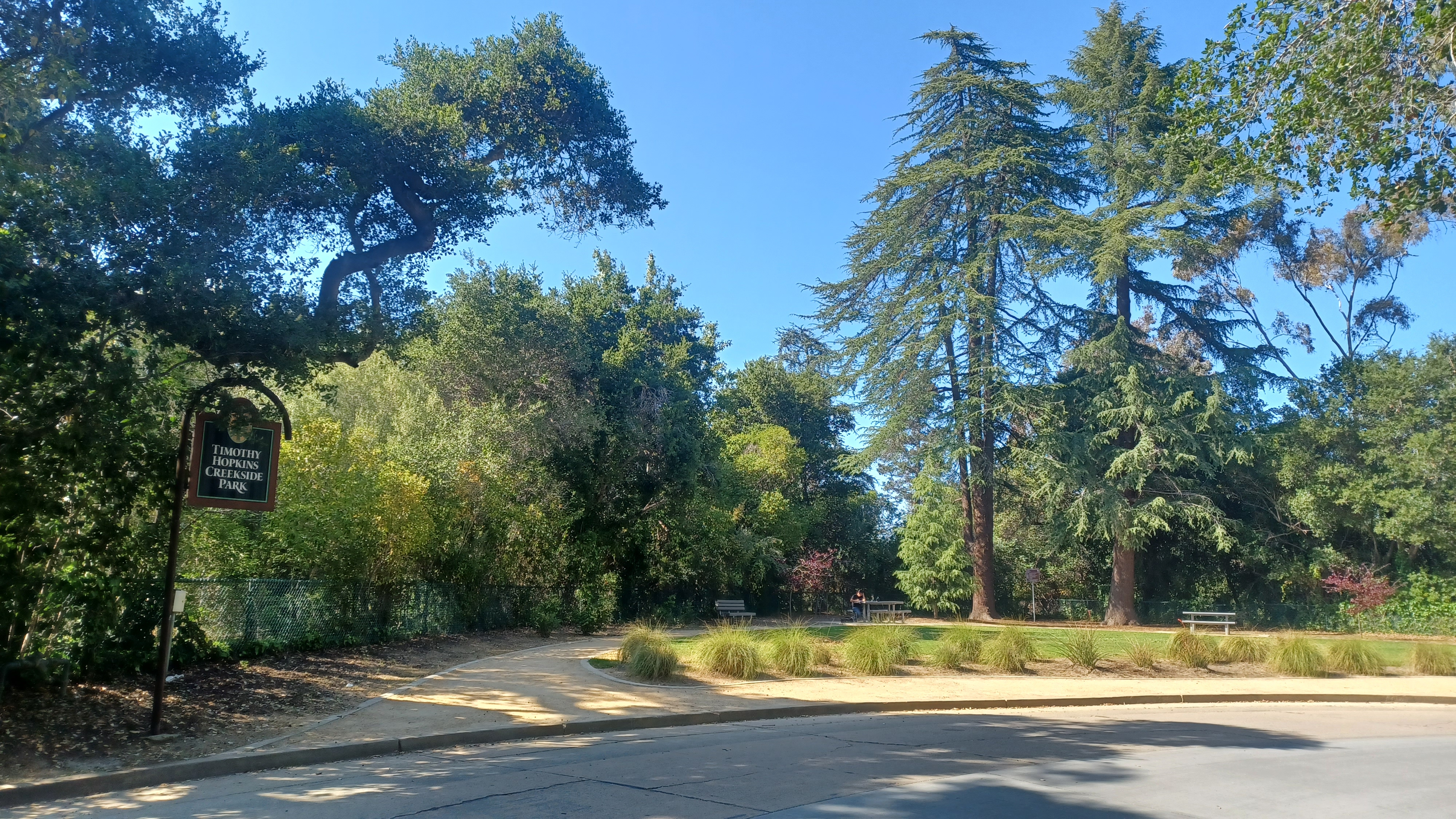
Hopkins Creekside Park in Palo Alto

- Hopkins Marine Station in Pacific Grove for which he provided some early funding, and, indirectly, the Hopkins Marine Life Refuge established by California in 1931 in the waters adjacent to the station.
- Hopkins Creekside Park in Palo Alto which is a narrow strip of land along 1.5 miles of San Francisquito Creek which Timothy Hopkins and his wife gave to Palo Alto for parkland in 1907.

== Taxon named in his honor ==
Sebastes hopkinsi, the squarespot rockfish is named for him.
