= Mark Hopkins Jr. =

American railway entrepreneur

- Born: September 3, 1813; Henderson, New York, U.S.
- Died: March 29, 1878 (aged 64); Yuma, Arizona, U.S.
- Resting place: Sacramento, California
- Occupations: Railroad investor & treasurer
- Employer: Central Pacific Railroad
- Known for: First transcontinental railroad
- Political party: Whig, Free Soil & Republican
- Spouse: Mary Frances Sherwood Hopkins
- Parent(s): Mark Hopkins (1779–1828); Anastasia Lukens Kellogg (1780–1837)

Mark Hopkins Jr. (September 3, 1813 – March 29, 1878) was an American railroad executive. He was one of four principal investors that funded Theodore D. Judah's idea of building a railway over the Sierra Nevada from Sacramento, California, to Promontory, Utah. They formed the Central Pacific Railroad along with Leland Stanford, Charles Crocker, and Collis Huntington in 1861.

== Early years and family life ==
Daguerreotype by Mathew Brady c. 1848–1849

Hopkins was born in Henderson, Jefferson County, New York to Mark Hopkins and Anastasia Lukens Kellogg, who were first cousins. Because his father died when he was a boy, he was never known as "Junior". The family moved to St. Clair, Michigan in 1824. His father, Mark Hopkins (1779–1828), served as Postmaster, first in Henderson, NY, then in St. Clair, Michigan (known then as Palmer, Michigan), where he was also Judge of Probate.

The elder Hopkins died in 1828, and his son left school to work as a clerk. In 1837, he studied law with his brother Henry but moved on through several business ventures. He was a partner in a firm called "Hopkins and Hughes", then a bookkeeper and later manager for "James Rowland and Company".

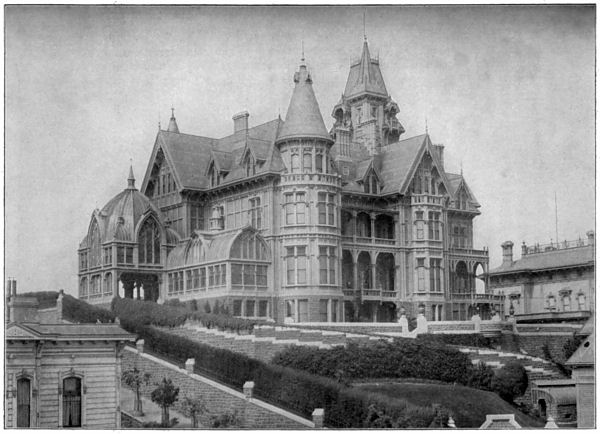
The Hopkins mansion on Nob Hill

On September 22, 1854, in New York City, Hopkins married his first cousin, Mary Frances Sherwood. Though his background was Congregationalist, the wedding was at a Presbyterian Church. Mary and Mark Hopkins had no children of their own. Despite Hopkins' thriftiness, his wife managed eventually to persuade him to build an ornate mansion at the top of Nob Hill in San Francisco, California, close to the mansions of other Central Pacific founders. The construction commenced in 1875. The architects were the prominent San Francisco firm of Wright & Sanders and the project manager was architectural engineer William Wallace Barbour Sheldon, who worked for Hopkins under the Southern Pacific Improvement Company.

== California ==
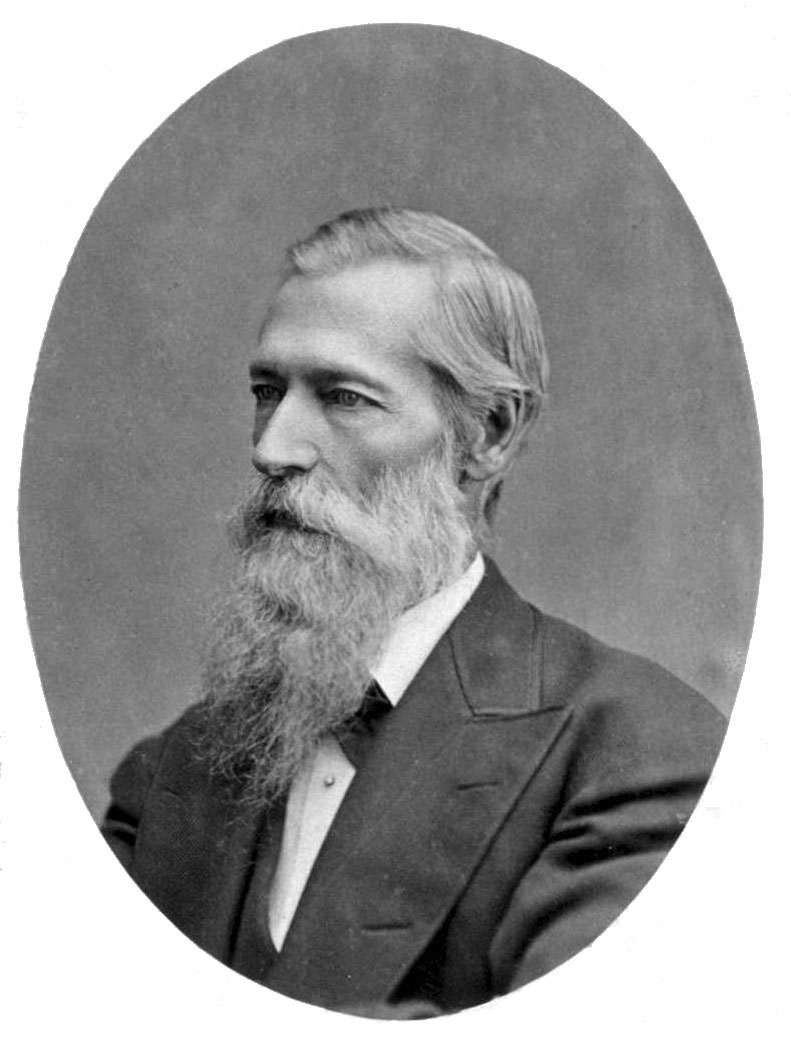
Portrait by I. W. Taber

When the California Gold Rush began, Hopkins created the "New England Mining and Trading Company", a group of 26 men each of whom invested $500 to purchase goods and ship them to California for sale. On January 22, 1849 Hopkins left New York City on the ship Pacific. After rounding Cape Horn, the ship arrived in San Francisco on August 5, 1849.

Hopkins opened a store in Placerville, California, but it did not succeed and he relocated to Sacramento where he opened a wholesale grocery in 1850 with his friend Edward H. Miller. Miller would later be secretary of the Central Pacific Railroad.

In 1855, Hopkins and Collis P. Huntington formed "Huntington Hopkins and Company" to operate a hardware and iron business in Sacramento.

In 1861, as part of The Big Four, he founded the Central Pacific Railroad. Sometimes called "Uncle Mark", he was the eldest of the four partners and was well known for his thriftiness (it was said that he knew how to "squeeze 106 cents out of every dollar", a reputation that gained him the post of company treasurer. Noted American historian Hubert Howe Bancroft quotes Collis Huntington as saying, "I never thought anything finished until Hopkins looked at it". Bancroft described Hopkins as the "balance-wheel of the Associates and one of the truest and best men that ever lived."

== Later years and death ==
A Whig and later associated with the Free Soil Party, Hopkins was an abolitionist and an organizer of the Republican Party in California.

By then, Hopkins was having health problems and in 1878 died aboard a company train near Yuma, Arizona. At the time of his death, the house was not complete and was eventually finished and occupied by Mary. The structure later burned to the ground in a fire caused by the 1906 San Francisco earthquake. In 1926, the Mark Hopkins Hotel (currently InterContinental Mark Hopkins San Francisco) was built on the site.

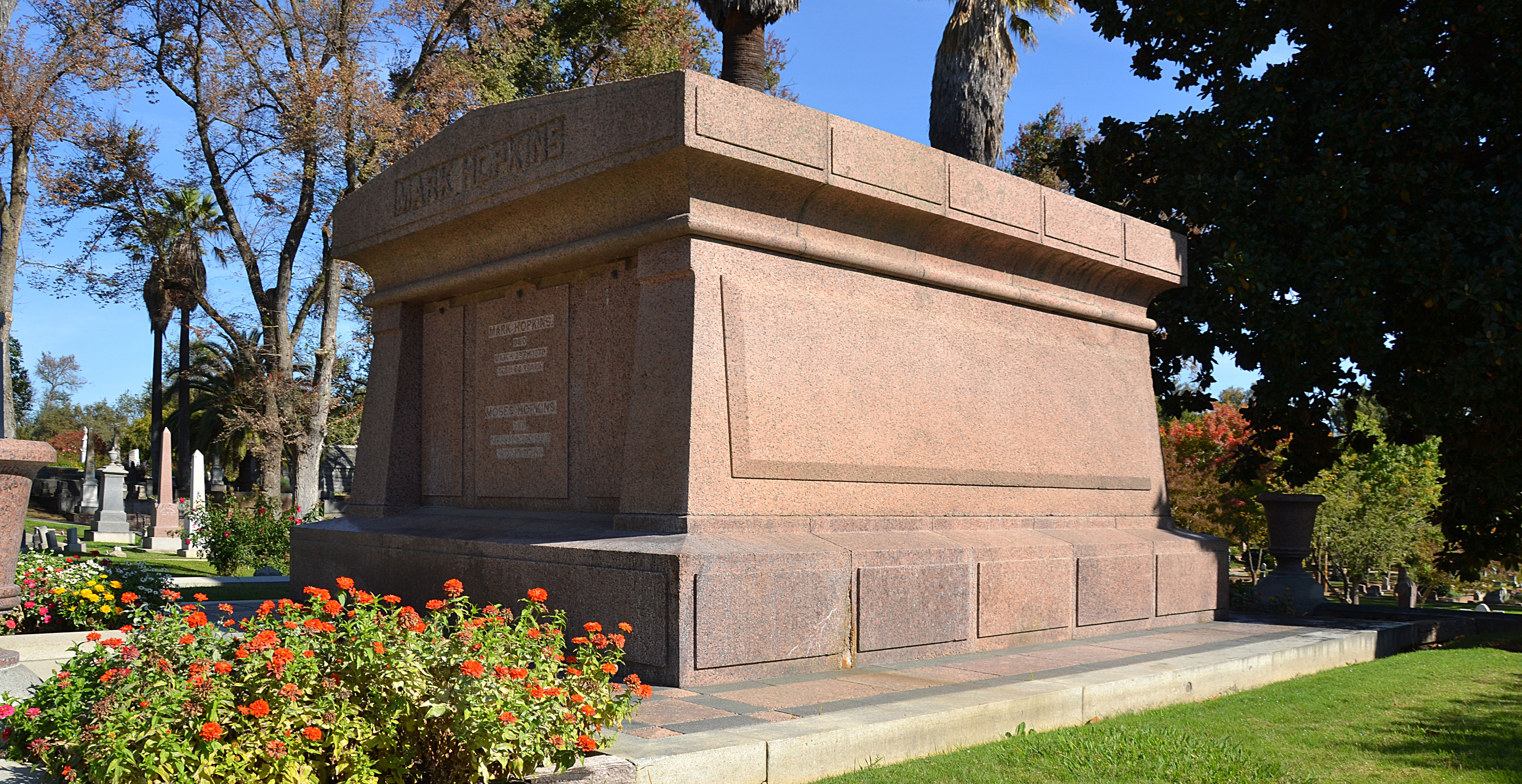
Mark Hopkins' grave at Sacramento Historic Cemetery

Hopkins is buried in Sacramento Historic City Cemetery (aka Old City Cemetery) in Sacramento, California.

Mary after her husband's death adopted Timothy Nolan (b. 1859), who had been raised by the Hopkins. He took the Hopkins name and in 1882 married his adopted mother's niece.

== Estate controversy ==
Hopkins died without leaving a will, though his fortune estimated at $20–$40 million was inherited by his wife. Faced with the task of completing their new estate alone, Mary retained Herter Brothers, a prominent furniture and interior decorating firm in New York to finish furnishing and decorating the estate. Edward Francis Searles was dispatched by Herter Brothers to manage the completion of Mary's project.

Despite being 22 years her junior, he and Mary developed a close relationship. The unseemly courtship raised eyebrows and questions about the motives of the decorator in the wealthy social circles of San Francisco, but they married in 1887 to begin a six-month grand tour of Europe. Shortly after their return, Mary executed a new will that explicitly excluded her adopted son Timothy Nolan Hopkins, explaining; "The omission to provide in this will for my adopted son, Timothy Hopkins, is intentional, and not occasioned by accident or mistake", and left her fortunes to her new husband, Edward.

Mr. and Mrs. Searles moved to Edward's hometown of Methuen, Massachusetts, where Edward embarked on building a series of grand homes designed by English architect Henry Vaughan. Vaughan was best known for his Gothic Revival ecclesiastical architecture including; the National Cathedral in Washington, D.C., three chapels at the Cathedral of St. John the Divine in New York, and Christ Church, New Haven, Connecticut.

Mary died in 1891, less than four years after her marriage and the estate went into probate to reconcile a series of legal challenges by Timothy Hopkins (Mary's adopted son) that lasted for several years, to reclaim his lost inheritance. The controversy made good fodder for the press, California papers published stories suggesting that Edward had exploited Mary's interest in spiritualism and falsified records to wrest the estate from her adopted son and defraud business partners. Under oath, Edward testified that he had married Mary "…partly out of affection and partly for her money." Timothy lost his appeals; however, Edward later settled on Timothy a "token" amount of several million dollars. Timothy got the contents of the mansion in San Francisco, and the art institute got the building. (It was rumored at the time that Edward Searles had a friend/lover living with him after Mary's death and that Timothy Hopkins used this information to blackmail Edward after losing the court case.)

General Thomas Hubbard had been named the executor of Mary Frances Searles' will, and had been embroiled in the controversy as a witness with detailed knowledge of the Hopkins and Searles estates. When the probate case closed in Edward's favor, Hubbard declined any personal compensation but suggested an endowment to his alma mater Bowdoin College might make an enduring symbol of Edward's love for Mary. Edward agreed to build them the modern science building, still in service as Searles Hall.

For the remainder of his life, Edward, increasingly reclusive, continued building castles and estates designed by Henry Vaughan, including Searles Castle in Windham, New Hampshire, (a ¼ replica of Stanton Harcourt Manor in Oxon, England) and Pine Lodge in his hometown of Methuen, Massachusetts.

Eventually, Edward Searles' business manager, Arthur T Walker, inherited the Hopkins estate. He died several years later living modestly, as though he had never inherited a thing.
