= Pleasant–High Historic District =

Historic district in Massachusetts, United States

- U.S. National Register of Historic Places
- U.S. Historic district
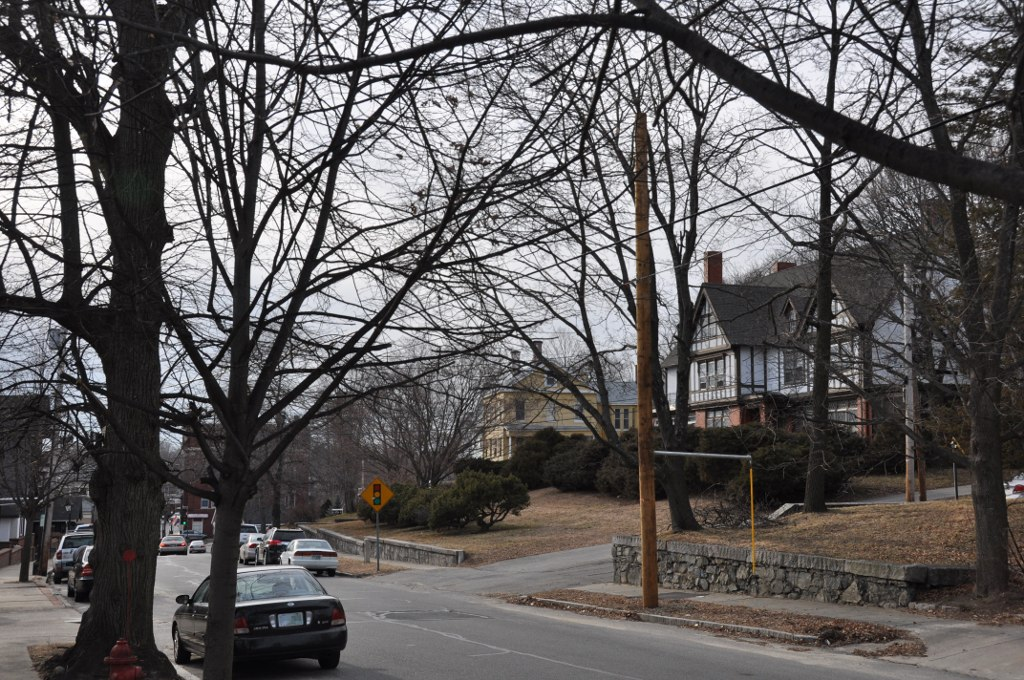
- Pleasant Street

- Location within Massachusetts Location within the United States
- Location: Methuen, Massachusetts
- Coordinates: 42°43′47″N 71°11′9″W
- Architectural style: Late Victorian
- MPS: Methuen MRA
- NRHP reference No.: 84002417
- Added to NRHP: June 20, 1984

The Pleasant–High Historic District encompasses the earliest area of non-agricultural residential development in Methuen, Massachusetts. It encompasses houses along High and Pleasant Streets from just east of Broadway to Vine Street, as well as a few that face on adjoining streets. The district was listed on the National Register of Historic Places in 1984; on its western boundary it abuts the Spicket Falls Historic District.

Prior to 1800 Methuen, which then included part of what is now Lawrence, was a predominantly rural agricultural town. Its primary industrial facility consisted of a gristmill and cotton mill, located at the falls of the Spicket River in what is now the town center. The construction in 1806 of the Turnpike (now Broadway) led to development of a housing district to its east, on a rise overlooking the area where the falls and mills were located. By 1810 Pleasant Street and High Street (originally called George Street) had been laid out, and the earliest Federal style houses, at 36 High Street (c. 1820) and 18-20 Pleasant Street (c. 1810), soon followed.

The mills were expanded in 1826 and again in 1855, bringing development in the residential area to provide housing for mill workers, and the location of the First Congregational Church (separately listed in 1978) at 30 Pleasant Street in 1832 cemented the area as the primary center of the town. After 1855 a number of Second Empire houses were built in the area, and scattered exemplars of other 19th century architectural styles followed. In 1890 mill owner David Nevins plotted out a subdivision of about 100 plots in the area of Gage and Stevens Streets, from which a number of Queen Anne, Shingle, Georgian Revival, and Colonial Revival properties (built between 1890 and 1910) survive. The principal public space in the district is the site of the American Civil War memorial, located in the triangular area where Pleasant and Charles Streets meet.

== See also ==
- National Register of Historic Places listings in Methuen, Massachusetts
- National Register of Historic Places listings in Essex County, Massachusetts
