= John Dewey Academy =

Private, therapeutic boarding school in Great Barrington, Massachusetts, United States

Location
- 389 Main Street; Great Barrington, Massachusetts 01230; United States; 42°11′30.39″N 73°21′57.57″W

Information
- School type: Private, Independent, College-preparatory, Day & Boarding
- Established: 1985
- Founder: Thomas E. Bratter
- Head teacher: David Baum
- Age range: 15-21
- Website: www.jda.org

The John Dewey Academy is a private, coeducational college preparatory therapeutic boarding school in Great Barrington, Massachusetts, formerly housed in Searles Castle. It was founded in 1985 by Dr. Thomas E. Bratter, who died in 2012. In May 2020, the school was purchased by its current head of school, David Baum. As of July 2022, the school was on hiatus for a "complete reboot" at a new location, but as of July 2026, no announcement has been made of a re-opening.

It is coeducational and enrolls about 25 high school students, ages 15 to 21, typically in grades 10 to postgraduate. The student-teacher ratio is 3:1 and classes typically average about six students. On their website, the academy states that all graduates attend college.

The John Dewey Academy has been cited to use Caring Confrontation Psychotherapy (CCP) as its primary form of treatment, a form of therapy created by Tom Bratter. CCP's critics refer to it as "attack therapy" and point to its consistent use in institutions that have been shut down for abuse, such as Synanon, CEDU, and the Elan School. A 2011 blog post from the John Dewey Academy addressed and criticized the closure of the Elan School, attributing its allegations and subsequent closure to "the corrosive influence of the rumor mill as well as misconceptions about programs fostered by gossip and false information" before promoting the academy itself as an option for those who were looking to attend a school like Elan. For much of the school's existence, it was unclear whether the John Dewey Academy followed in this abusive pattern, as studies of John Dewey Academy were conducted either by or in direct consultation with its founder, Tom Bratter. These studies primarily consist of Bratter providing predominantly anecdotal evidence of the academy's successes and asserting that "the John Dewey Academy’s treatment results are the best of any residential program that provides intensive therapeutic and education for alienated adolescents who require residential placement."

The school was listed in the Boston Globe's Spotlight study of abuse in private schools, which specifically identified lawsuits against founder Thomas Bratter and faculty Gwendolyn Hampton.

In March 2021, the Berkshire Eagle came out with an exposé about the abuse at the John Dewey Academy titled "Former students of Great Barrington prep school describe it as 'torture chamber'" In response, the school closed in 2022, with Baum stating "Reboot, revise, re-staff — everything’s on the table."
