= Searles Castle (Massachusetts) =

Historic house in Massachusetts

- U.S. National Register of Historic Places
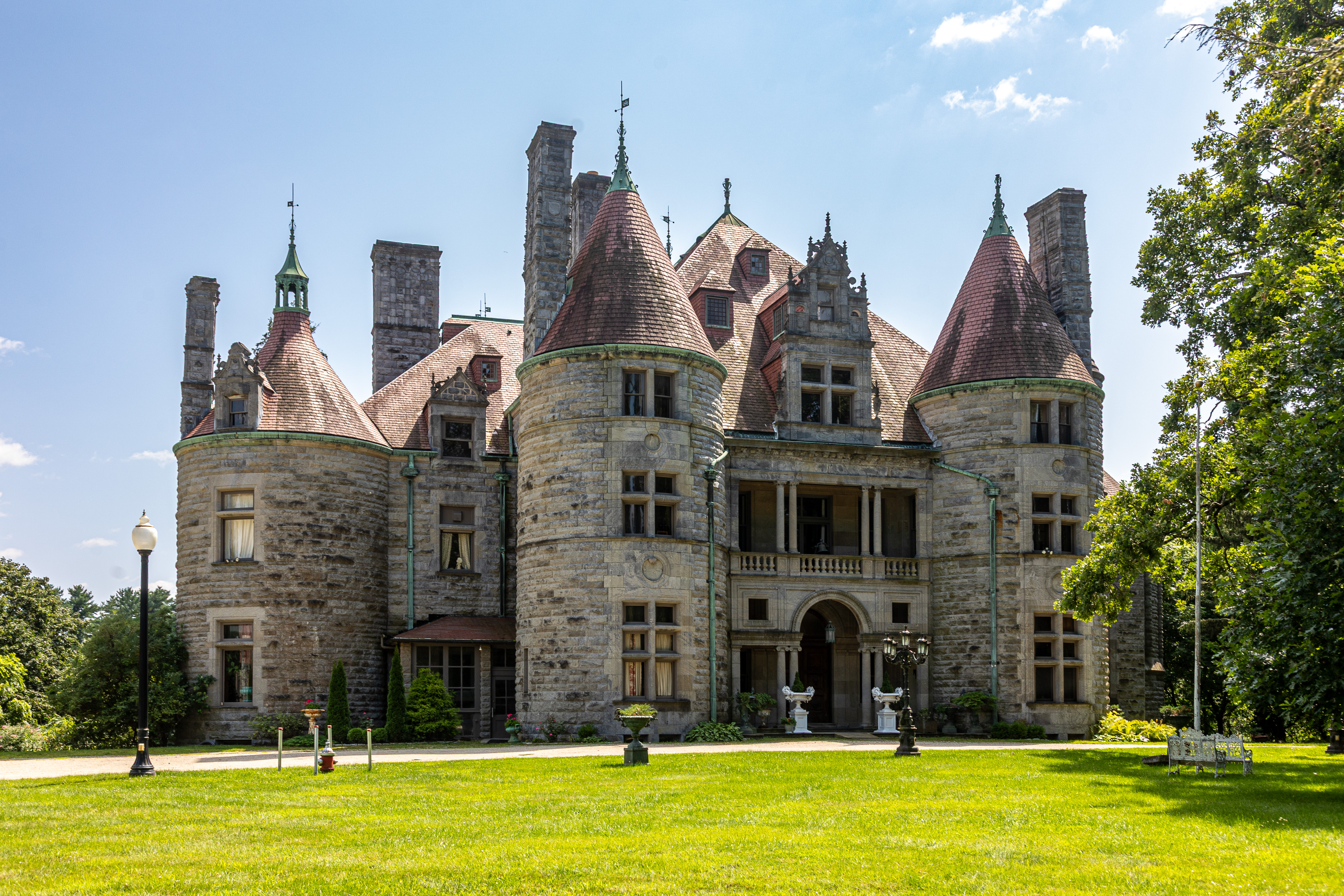
- Searles Castle

- Location within Massachusetts Location within the United States
- Location: 389 Main Street, Great Barrington, Massachusetts
- Coordinates: 42°11′31″N 73°21′45″W
- Area: 64 acres (26 ha)
- Built: 1886
- Built by: Norcross Bros.
- Architect: Stanford White (McKim, Mead and White)
- Architectural style: Renaissance, Chateauesque
- NRHP reference No.: 82004953
- Added to NRHP: April 15, 1982

The Searles Castle is a French chateau-style castle-style house in Great Barrington, Massachusetts. Built in the 1880s, the romantically imagined structure has seven stories and includes a "dungeon" basement. There are 40 rooms containing 54,246 square feet (5,039.6 m^{2}) of floor space, as well as 36 fireplaces.

== History ==
The castle was initially designed by Stanford White of McKim, Mead and White, a famous New York architectural firm at the time.

Originally known as Kellogg Terrace, the castle was commissioned in 1875 for Mary Sherwood Hopkins by her husband Mark Hopkins, treasurer and one of the founders of the Central Pacific Railroad. Mark Hopkins died in 1878 and Mary Hopkins married Edward Francis Searles, who had designed the interior while the castle was being built. He was 23 years younger than she was. Hopkins died in 1891, but Searles maintained the castle until his death in 1920.

After Searles died, the structure was used as a private girls' school for 30 years. It then passed through a variety of owners and uses, serving as a training and conference center for The Home Insurance Company of New York, an all-girls boarding school, and a country club. From the mid-1980s, it housed John Dewey Academy, a school for troubled intellectually gifted teens. The castle was listed for sale in 2007 for $15 million. It was sold to artist Hunt Slonem in 2021 for $3.25 million.

== Architecture ==
In 1888, the property was 229 acres (93 ha). The stone of the exterior of the castle is blue dolomite. All the pillars in the atrium were hollowed out except one. The Louis XV Versailles Room was imported from Venice. There had been an organ in the music hall, but it was removed when the castle became the John Dewey Academy, due to its Christian connotations. There are three safes on the first floor, one in the dining hall and two in the kitchen. The safe in the kitchen had silver in it when the castle switched owners. The wood floors are finger locked construction, meaning there are no nails used anywhere. The castle was one of the first places to have its own built-in walk-in cooler. The pond was built as a cross specifically so it could reflect the castle from the other side, to add to the beauty when people would have tea by the façade. There is a secret stairway connecting the second-floor bedroom where Mary Hopkins slept to the third-floor bedroom where Edward Searles slept, which they used go between each other's rooms. The carriage house which currently stands was not the original. The original burned down a few years after the castle was completed, and was replaced by the current one.

== In film ==
The 1996 movie Before and After was filmed in the castle. This movie included actors Liam Neeson and Meryl Streep. The 2016 movie Like Lambs was also filmed in the castle.

== See also ==
- National Register of Historic Places listings in Berkshire County, Massachusetts
- Searles Castle (New Hampshire)
