= Armstrong Memorial Building =

- U.S. National Register of Historic Places
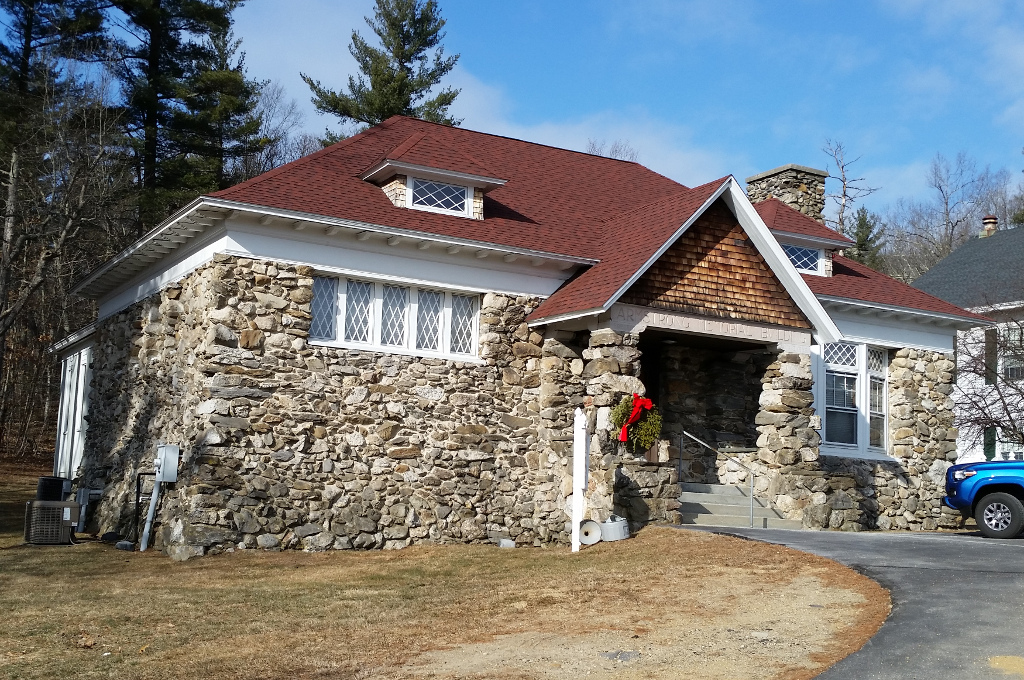

- Location within New Hampshire Location within the United States
- Location: 3 N Lowell Rd., Windham, New Hampshire
- Coordinates: 42.80542°N 71.29984°W
- Area: less than one acre
- Built: 1899
- Architect: William Weare Dinsmoor
- Architectural style: Shingle; Colonial Revival
- NRHP reference No.: 100002974
- Added to NRHP: September 11, 2018

The Armstrong Memorial Building is a historic municipal building at 3 North Lowell Road in Windham, New Hampshire, United States. Built in 1899, it was the town's first purpose-built library building, a role it played until 1997. It now houses the town museum. The building was listed on the National Register of Historic Places in 2018.

== Description and history ==
The Armstrong Memorial Building is located in the town center of Windham, a cluster of municipal, civic, and religious buildings near the junction of New Hampshire Route 111 and North Lowell Road. It stands on the northwest side of North Lowell Road, sharing a drive with the old town hall and a public works garage. It is a single-story structure, with a fieldstone exterior and hip roof. The roof has exposed rafter ends in the eaves, and small hip-roof dormers on the front face. Windows consist of bands of casement windows with diamond lights. At the center of the front is the main entrance, sheltered by a project gabled portico supported by square stone columns.

Windham's early library, founded in the 18th century, was a subscription-based project shared with the neighboring town of Salem. Its first free public library was established in 1874 with funding from Windham native Colonel Thomas Nesmith which operated out of the town hall. In 1897, another Windham resident, George Washington Armstrong, donated funds for construction of a library building. This building was completed in 1899, designed by Windham architect William Weare Dinsmoor and built by mason Loren Emerson Bailey. The library remained here until 1997, when it moved to a modern facility on nearby Fellows Road.

== See also ==
- National Register of Historic Places listings in Rockingham County, New Hampshire
