= Spicket Falls Historic District =

Historic district in Massachusetts, United States

- U.S. National Register of Historic Places
- U.S. Historic district
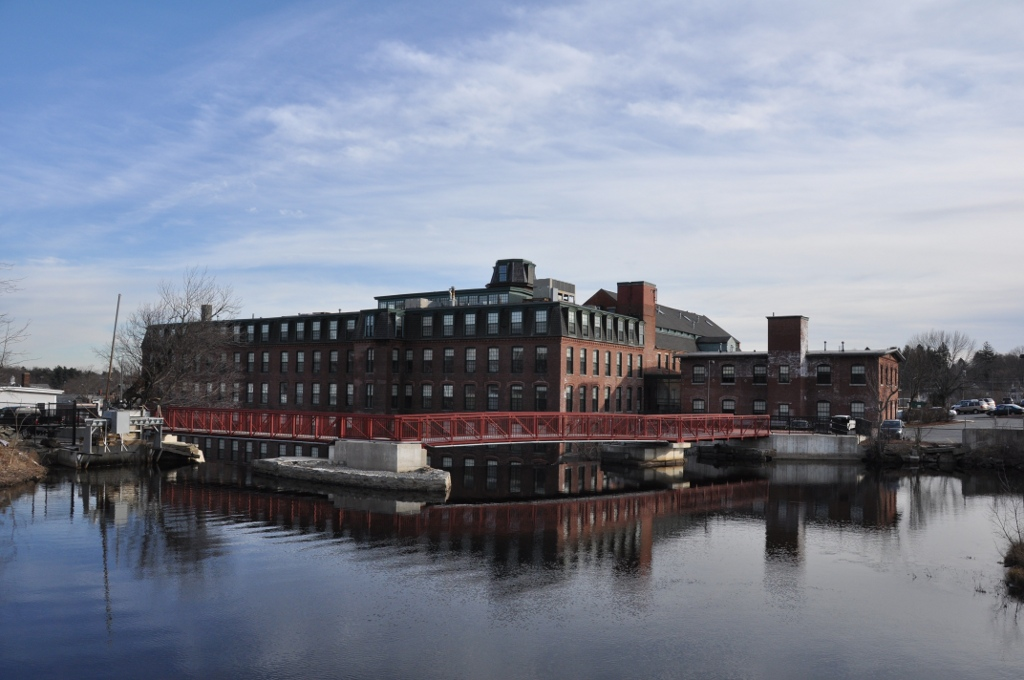
- The mill pond on the Spicket River

- Location within Massachusetts Location within the United States
- Location: Methuen, Massachusetts
- Coordinates: 42°43′36″N 71°11′21″W
- Architect: Multiple
- Architectural style: Late Victorian
- MPS: Methuen MRA
- NRHP reference No.: 84002435
- Added to NRHP: June 20, 1984

The Spicket Falls Historic District encompasses the historic industrial and commercial heart of Methuen, Massachusetts, and one of the lower Merrimack River's best-preserved 19th century mill complexes. It is centered on the falls of the Spicket River, from which the 19th century textile mills of Methuen derived their power. The historic district, listed on the National Register of Historic Places in 1984, includes commercial and civic buildings in and near Gaunt Square, the heart of the city, and along both sides of the Spicket River between Gaunt Square and the Boston and Maine Railroad tracks south of the river. It abuts the residential Pleasant-High Historic District, which lies to its east.

== History ==
The falls of the Spicket River were the site of small scale industrial works in the 18th century, but the area did not begin to take shape as the town center until larger-scale development began in the 1820s. The area had long been a stop on the north–south route, with hotels and taverns dating from the mid 19th century. The oldest buildings that survive are brick buildings constructed in 1825 and 1826, when the main "A" mill was built. The mill complex was expanded in the 1840s with the construction of a wood frame cotton processing mill and a brick warehouse near the railroad. Industrial David Nevins added six more buildings and a new dam between 1879 and 1882.

== Notable buildings ==
A number of buildings from the middle 19th century survive, including the Masonic Hall, which was formerly a hotel. The old brick town hall, from whose parking lot fine views of the Spicket valley are seen, was built in 1853 with Greek Revival styling. Notable early 20th century additions to the area include the central fire station (1899, Romanesque Revival), the Oddfellows' Hall (1904, Renaissance Revival), and the 1909 railroad station, built in Queen Anne style with funds donated by philanthropist Edward Searles.

== See also ==
- National Register of Historic Places listings in Methuen, Massachusetts
- National Register of Historic Places listings in Essex County, Massachusetts
