= Daddy Frye's Hill Cemetery =

Historic cemetery in Massachusetts, United States

- U.S. National Register of Historic Places
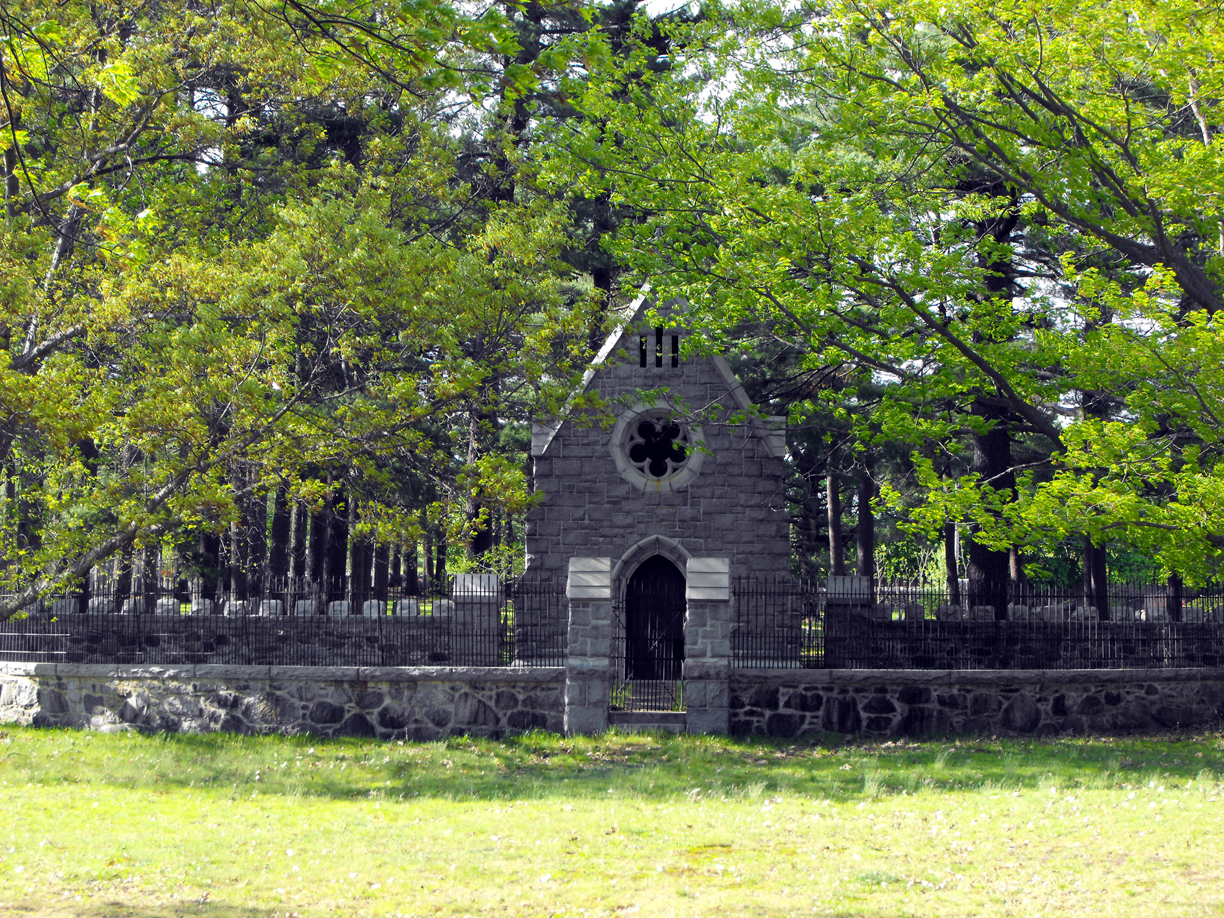
- Daddy Frye's Hill Cemetery c.2009

- Location within Massachusetts Location within the United States
- Location: East, Brook, Berkeley, and Arlington Sts., Methuen, Massachusetts
- Coordinates: 42°43′31″N 71°9′58″W
- Area: 2.4 acres (0.97 ha)
- Built: 1728
- MPS: Methuen MRA
- NRHP reference No.: 84002320
- Added to NRHP: January 20, 1984

Daddy Frye's Hill Cemetery is a historic cemetery at East and Arlington Streets in Methuen, Massachusetts. Established in 1728, it is the city's oldest cemetery, and the only major surviving element of its original town center. It was listed on the National Register of Historic Places in 1984. The area is also locally known as Meeting House Hill.

== Description and history ==
Daddy Frye's Hill Cemetery is located north of downtown Methuen, on a roughly rectangular block bounded by East, Arlington, Brook, and Berkeley Streets. It covers about 2.4 acres (0.97 ha), whose borders are lined either by a mortared stone wall, or by chain-link fencing. The terrain trends gently downhill to the south, and is dotted with trees. Most of the gravestones are oriented facing west, and are of slate or marble. The artwork on the markers is typical of the 18th and 19th centuries: winged skulls, willows, and urns are frequently seen. The most prominent feature within the cemetery is the stone memorial chapel built in the late 19th century by the businessman and philanthropist Edward Searles, honoring his aunt and uncle. The surrounding stone wall dates to the same period, and was also funded by Searles.

The cemetery site was known from an early date as "Meeting House Hill", because it was here that the townspeople erected the first Meeting House in 1728, and the second in 1798. This building was removed in 1832, and replaced by the present stone church in 1855, which retains some of the timbers from the 1796 structure. Afterward the hill became more commonly known as Daddy Frye's Hill, for Jeremiah Frye, who kept a large tavern on the northwest corner of the intersection of East and Brook Streets. The town founders and its first minister, the Reverend Christopher Sargent are all buried here.

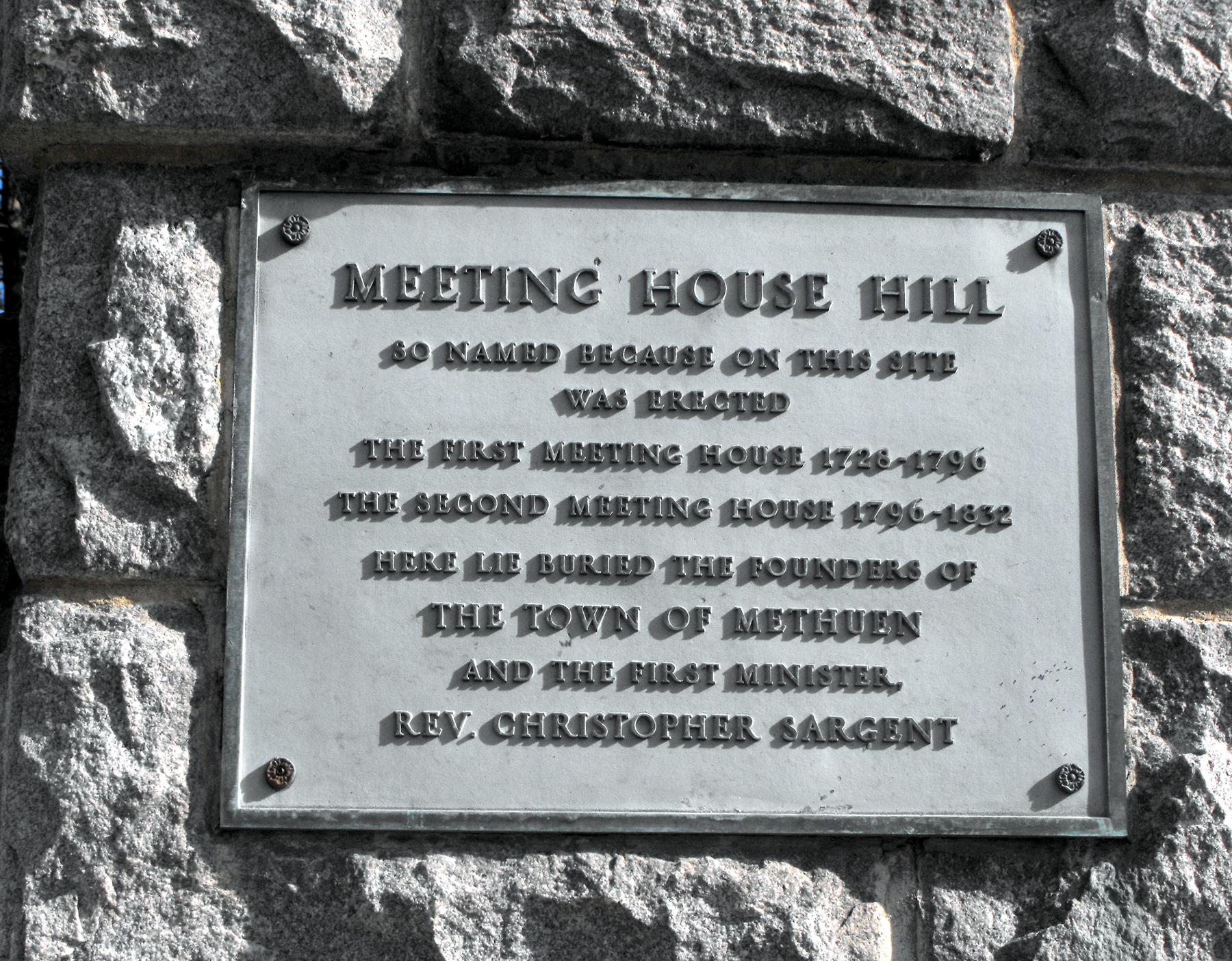
Plaque on Cemetery Granite Wall

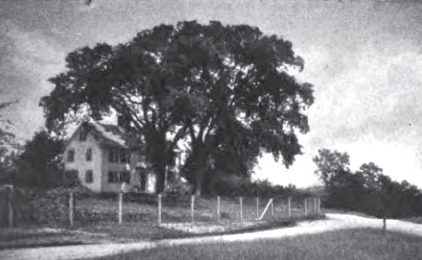
Daddy Frye's Tavern c.1900

== See also ==
- National Register of Historic Places listings in Methuen, Massachusetts
