= Mary Hopkins Searles =

Mary Frances Hopkins Searles (née Sherwood; March 8, 1818 – July 25, 1891) was an American millionaire. After her first husband's death, she was one of the richest women in the United States, and used her wealth to realize her architectural interests.

== Life ==
Mary Frances Sherwood was born in New York City, the daughter of headmaster William Sherwood. She was educated in Great Barrington, Massachusetts. She married her first husband, railroad tycoon Mark Hopkins, Jr., on September 22, 1854. Hopkins and Sherwood were first cousins. The childless couple lived for most of their marriage in Sacramento, California, moving to San Francisco for the last four years of Hopkins' life.

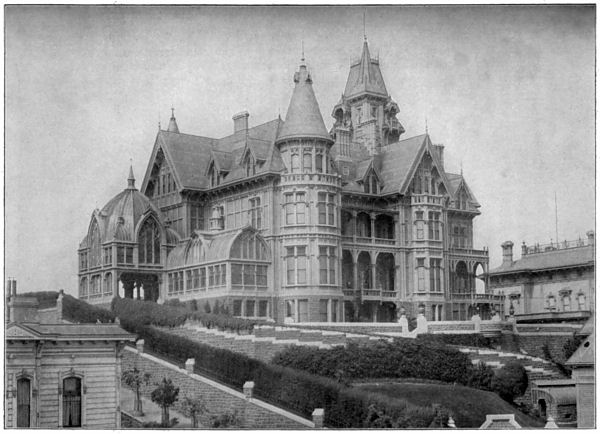
The San Francisco Hopkins estate

Mary Hopkins developed her interest in grand architecture during this marriage. She convinced her husband to build a grand estate in San Francisco to match those of the other railroad tycoons of the era. The house was furnished by Herter Brothers, and was completed in 1880 (two years after Mark Hopkins' 1878 death). The house was later used to house the San Francisco Art Institute. The house was destroyed in a fire resulting from the 1906 San Francisco earthquake.

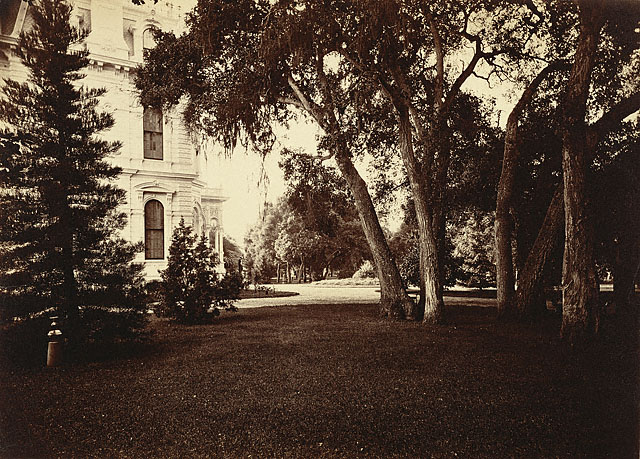
Sherwood Hall (earlier known as the Barron-Latham-Hopkins Gate Lodge)

On November 7, 1887, Mary Hopkins married Edward Francis Searles. On the occasion of this marriage, She gave her home in Menlo Park to her adopted son Timothy. The Searles together built Searles Castle in Great Barrington on the grounds of the Kellogg Terrace home that Mary Searles had owned since 1881.

The bulk of her estate passed to Searles, while her adopted son Timothy, who had married Sherwood's niece, received only a small portion, resulting in a prolonged dispute. When Edward Searles died in 1920, he left his inherited estate to the Methuen Memorial Music Hall.

== Sources ==
- Ingham, John N. (1983). Biographical Dictionary of American Business Leaders. Greenwood Publishing Group. ISBN 0-313-21362-3.
- "Obituary of Ms. Hopkins Searles". The Record-Union. Sacramento. July 27, 1891.
