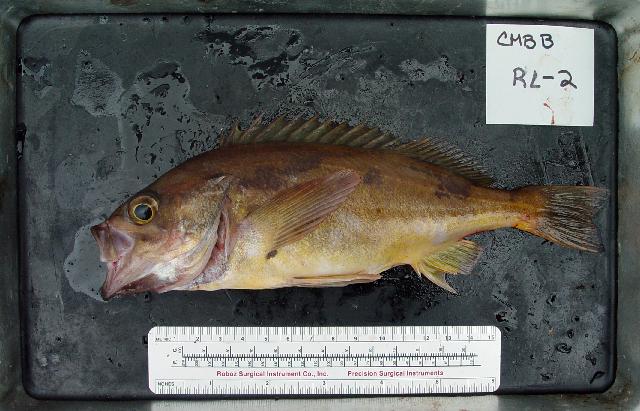

Scientific classification
- Kingdom: Animalia
- Phylum: Chordata
- Class: Actinopterygii
- Order: Perciformes
- Family: Scorpaenidae
- Genus: Sebastes
- Species: S. hopkinsi

Binomial name
- Sebastes hopkinsi (Cramer, 1895)

Synonyms
- Sebastodes hopkinsi Cramer, 1895

= Sebastes hopkinsi =

Species of fish

Sebastes hopkinsi, the squarespot rockfish, is a species of marine ray-finned fish belonging to the subfamily Sebastinae, the rockfishes, part of the family Scorpaenidae. This species is found in the Eastern Pacific.

== Taxonomy ==
Sebastes hopkinsi was first formally described in 1895 as Sebastodes hopkinsi by the American zoologist and teacher Frank Cramer with the type locality given as Pacific Grove, California. Some authorities classify this species in the subgenus Acutomentum.

== Etymology ==
The specific name honours the founder of the Hopkins Marine Station, where Cramer undertook his zoological research, and philanthropist Timothy Hopkins.

== Description ==
Sebastes hopkinsi has a scaly body which is oval-shaped and which has a depth equivalent to around a third, or slightly more, of its standard length. This species does not have the spines in the head borne by most rockfish species. Its overall colour is tellowish brown or tan with indistinct saddle marks on the upper body and head. Sometimes there is dark sideways chevron on their operculum to the rear of the eyes, however, this frequently fades after collection as the fish becomes a uniform colour. An important identification feature is a dark line on the upper lip like a moustache. The fins are dark with the anal and pelvic fins being paler and the weakly lunate caudal fin being the darkest. They have a moderately long head with comparatively small eyes and a small terminally located mouth. The dorsal fin has 12–13 spines and 13–17 soft rays while the anal fin has 3 spines and 6–8 soft rays. This species attains a maximum total length of 29 cm (11 in).

== Distribution and habitat ==
Sebastess hopkinsi is found in the eastern Pacific Ocean from San Quintin, Baja California north to the Farallon Islands of California, although it is scarce north on Monterey Bay. This species is found on shallow reefs at depths between 18 and 183 m (59 and 600 ft).

== Biology ==
Sebastes hopkinsi is a diurnal, schooling fish which rests under cover at night. They feed mainly on invertebrates such as krill, copepods and zooplankton. Like other rock fishes this species is ovoviviparous.
