= Cobbetts Pond =

Lake in Rockingham County, New Hampshire

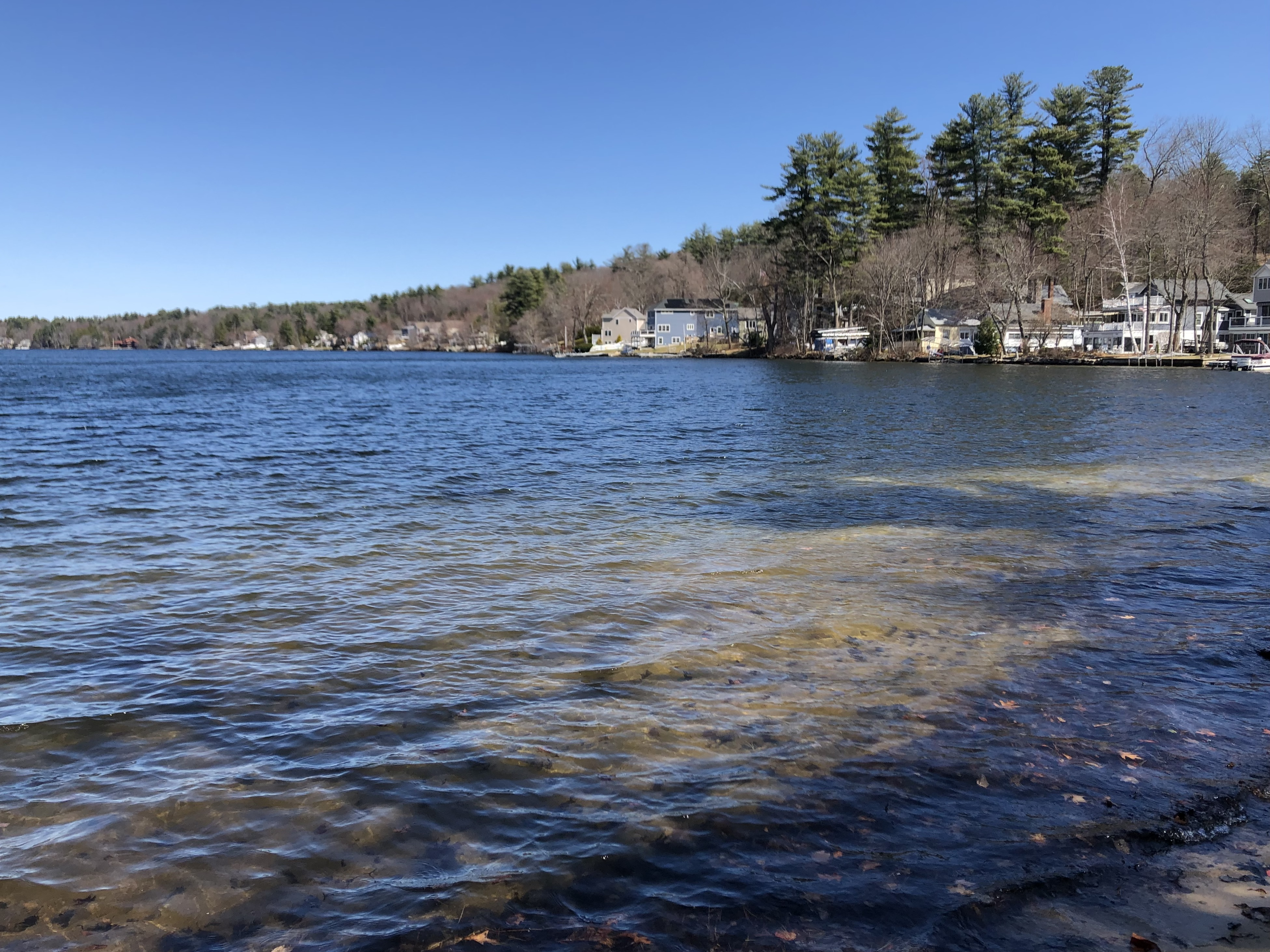
- Cobbetts Pond (April 2025)

- Location within New Hampshire Location within the United States
- Location: Rockingham County, New Hampshire
- Coordinates: 42°47′48″N 71°17′18″W
- Primary outflows: Golden Brook
- Basin countries: United States
- Max. length: 1.9 mi (3.1 km)
- Max. width: 0.4 mi (0.6 km)
- Surface area: 302 acres (1.2 km^{2})
- Average depth: 33 ft (10 m)
- Max. depth: 50 ft (15 m)
- Surface elevation: 177 ft (54 m)
- Settlements: Windham

Cobbetts Pond is a 302-acre (1.2 km^{2}) water body located in Rockingham County in southern New Hampshire, United States, in the town of Windham. It is approximately 2 miles (3 km) long, and the shoreline forms the shape of an 8. The average depth is 33 feet (10 m), with a maximum depth of 50 ft (15 m).

Cobbetts Pond is home to many different types of lakeside homes, ranging from seasonal cottages to year-round multimillion-dollar houses. These homes are all part of the Cobbett's Pond Village District. Located on the west edge of the pond is the Windham Town Beach, which is open to town residents and has an enclosed swimming area. The area is supervised by a lifeguard.

During the summer months, watersport shows, boat parades, and fireworks take place. There are no posted speed limits for boats, but there is a warden that occasionally patrols the pond by boat. The winter months are less busy on the pond, since most homes are only seasonal and fit to be used in warm weather. Ice fishing and skating are common activities during the winter.

Cobbetts Pond is primarily a spring-fed body of water. Water from the pond flows via Golden Brook and Beaver Brook to the Merrimack River in Lowell, Massachusetts.

The pond is classified as a warmwater fishery, with observed species including smallmouth bass, largemouth bass, chain pickerel, brown bullhead, and bluegill.

== See also ==
- List of lakes in New Hampshire
