= Windham, New Hampshire =

- Town
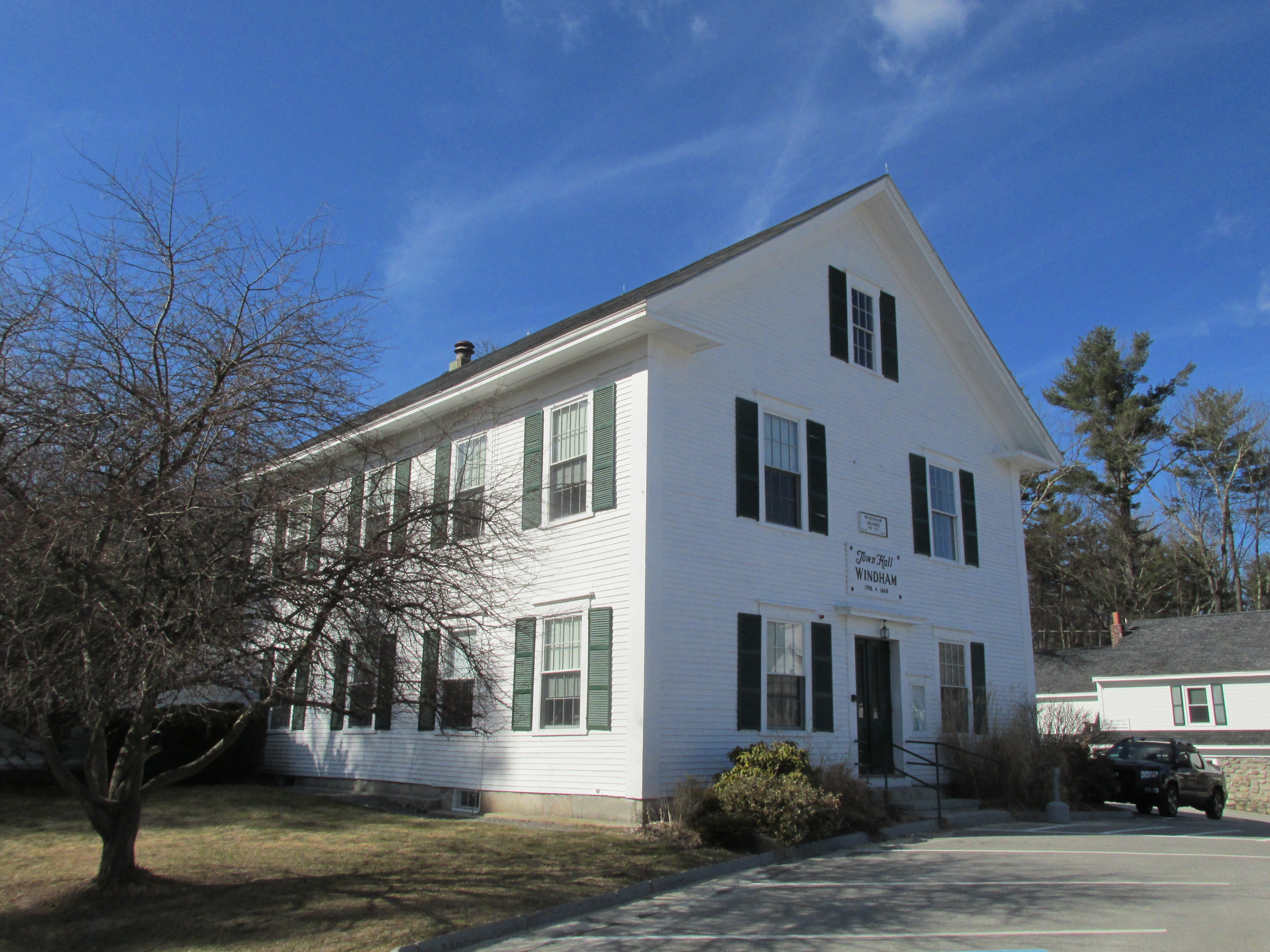
- Town hall

- Flag Seal
- Motto: Old Values, New Horizons
- Location in Rockingham County and the state of New Hampshire
- Coordinates: 42°48′27″N 71°17′58″W
- Country: United States
- State: New Hampshire
- County: Rockingham
- Incorporated: 1742
- Villages: Windham; West Windham; Windham Depot

Area
  - Total: 27.78 sq mi (71.95 km^{2})
  - Land: 26.75 sq mi (69.27 km^{2})
  - Water: 1.03 sq mi (2.68 km^{2}) 3.73%
- Elevation: 256 ft (78 m)

Population (2020)
  - Total: 15,817
  - Density: 592/sq mi (228.4/km^{2})
- Time zone: UTC-5 (Eastern)
  - Summer (DST): UTC-4 (Eastern)
- ZIP code: 03087
- Area code: 603
- FIPS code: 33-85780
- GNIS feature ID: 873758
- Website: www.windhamnh.gov

Windham is a town in Rockingham County, New Hampshire, United States. The population at the 2020 census was 15,817, up from 13,592 in 2010. It is part of the Boston-Cambridge-Newton, MA-NH Metropolitan Statistical Area.

== History ==
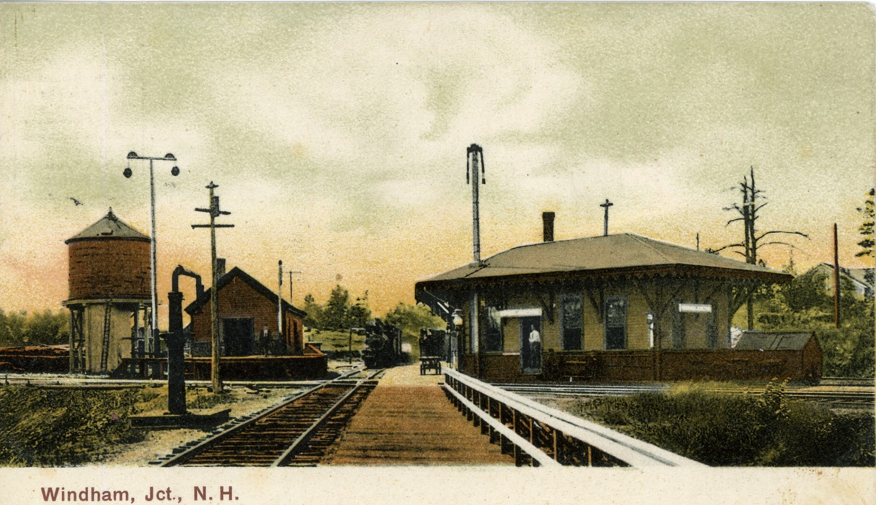
Windham railroad junction, c. 1900

The area was initially home to the Pawtucket Native Americans. Scots-Irish immigrants began to settle in the area in 1719. The region was known as "Nutfield," and included what are now the neighboring towns of Derry and Londonderry. By 1721, some of the original settlers petitioned to form a separate independent community. Governor Benning Wentworth granted this request in 1742. One published theory holds that the community's name refers to Windham, Ireland, harkening back to the petitioners' homeland. However, it has been alternatively postulated that the town was named after Sir Charles Wyndham, 2nd Earl of Egremont, a member of Parliament from 1734 to 1750, Secretary of State for the Southern Department from 1761 to 1763, and a good friend of Governor Wentworth. The town of Windham was originally a parish of Londonderry. Windham was the second town designated by Governor Benning Wentworth following the establishment of the New Hampshire-Massachusetts border. The first census ever taken in Windham reported 663 residents in 1790.

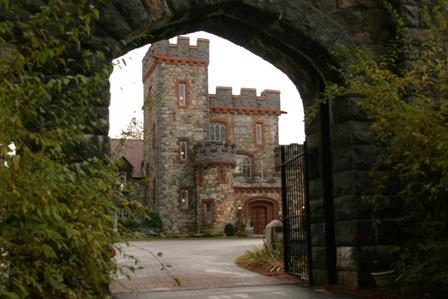
Searles Castle

Historic landmarks in Windham include the Searles School and Chapel, Searles Castle, the town center, and the Armstrong Memorial Building. Searles Castle is one of Windham's most prominent landmarks. Edward Francis Searles, an interior decorator and antique collector, built the castle. The architect, Henry Vaughn, modeled the castle's architecture after the style of the Stanton Harcourt Manor in Oxfordshire, England. The building was completed in 1915 at a cost of over $1,250,000. The castle contains over 20 rooms and is available to the public to be rented out for functions and events. In July 1909, Mr. Searles erected a commemorative plaque honoring Governor Dinsmoor "a few rods" from his birthplace on Jenny's Hill, which stands today as a designated historic landmark.

In 2021, Windham attracted attention in the wake of the attempts to overturn the results of the 2020 United States presidential election. Following the concurrent 2020 election to the New Hampshire House of Representatives, a Democratic candidate who lost her race by 24 votes requested a recount, only for the margin of victory for four Republican candidates to unexpectedly increase by 300 votes each. The results of the recount prompted the New Hampshire General Court to authorize an audit of Windham's ballot counting machines and hand tabulations. When Windham declined to select an auditor endorsed by supporters of President Donald Trump, about 500 supporters marched at a town board meeting, protesting alleged incidents of fraud and forcing the meeting to be moved to a local high school. Trump and his adviser, Windham resident Corey Lewandowski, also commented on the controversial audit. CNN reported that Trump supporters saw the audit as an opportunity to prove broader election integrity problems during the 2020 elections. The auditors said their assessments revealed no signs of fraud but rather "a confluence of errors."

== Geography ==
Windham is situated in Rockingham County in southeastern New Hampshire, approximately 3 miles (5 km) north of the Massachusetts border. It is accessible from Exit 3 of Interstate 93. Windham is considered a bedroom community because of its growing population (over 10,000), only about 160 commercial land parcels, and lack of public transportation. The nearest airport to Windham is Manchester–Boston Regional Airport, about 20 miles (32 km) to the north. Boston, Massachusetts, is 37 miles (60 km) to the south along Interstate 93. The landscape of Windham consists of suburban subdivisions, rural open spaces and large areas of undeveloped land.

According to the United States Census Bureau, the town has a total area of 27.8 square miles (71.9 km^{2}), of which 26.8 square miles (69.3 km^{2}) are land and 1.0 square mile (2.7 km^{2}) are water, comprising 3.73% of the town. The entire town is within the Merrimack River watershed. Beaver Brook forms the western border of the town, while the eastern side of town drains to the Spicket River in Salem. Cobbetts Pond is east of the geographic center of town, while Canobie Lake is on the eastern border. The highest point is Jenny's Hill in the northeastern part of town, at 505 feet (154 m) above sea level.

== Demographics ==
Historical population
Census	Pop.	Note	%±
1790	663		—
1800	751		13.3%
1810	742		−1.2%
1820	889		19.8%
1830	1,006		13.2%
1840	926		−8.0%
1850	818		−11.7%
1860	846		3.4%
1870	753		−11.0%
1880	695		−7.7%
1890	632		−9.1%
1900	641		1.4%
1910	656		2.3%
1920	543		−17.2%
1930	538		−0.9%
1940	630		17.1%
1950	964		53.0%
1960	1,317		36.6%
1970	3,008		128.4%
1980	5,664		88.3%
1990	9,000		58.9%
2000	10,709		19.0%
2010	13,592		26.9%
2020	15,817		16.4%
U.S. Decennial Census

As of the census of 2010, there were 13,592 people, 4,724 households, and 3,773 families residing in the town. The population density was 507.2 people per square mile of land (195.9/km^{2}). There were 5,164 housing units at an average density of 192.7 per square mile (74.4/km^{2}). The racial makeup of the town was 95.2% White, 0.4% African American, 0.2% Native American, 2.9% Asian, 0.1% Pacific Islander, 0.2% some other race, and 1.1% from two or more races. Hispanic or Latino of any race were 1.6% of the population.

There were 4,724 households, out of which 35.3% had children under the age of 18 living with them, 71.6% were headed by a married couple living together, 6.0% had a female householder with no husband present, and 20.1% were non-families. 15.7% of all households were made up of individuals, and 7.2% were someone living alone who was 65 years of age or older. The average household size was 2.87, and the average family size was 3.25.

In the town, the population was spread out, with 27.9% under the age of 18, 5.5% from 18 to 24, 22.1% from 25 to 44, 33.1% from 45 to 64, and 11.5% who were 65 years of age or older. The median age was 41.8 years. For every 100 females, there were 97.2 males. For every 100 females age 18 and over, there were 94.0 males.

For the period 2015–2019, the median income for a household in the town was $148,459 (in 2019 dollars). The per capita income for the town was $57,251. About 0.7% of the population is below the poverty line.

Between 2010 and 2020, Windham was one of the fastest-growing towns in New Hampshire and New England as a whole.

== Politics and government ==
Windham has historically been one of the most Republican towns in New Hampshire, almost always giving landslide margins to Republican candidates. In recent years, however, Windham has shifted strongly to the left. The town posted one of the largest swings towards Hillary Clinton from Barack Obama, and Joe Biden put up the best performance for a presidential Democrat in Windham as far back as records are available (1972).

Windham is in New Hampshire's 2nd congressional district, represented by Democrat Maggie Goodlander. In the New Hampshire House of Representatives, Windham sits in Rockingham District 17, which consists of four seats, represented by Republicans Katelyn Kuttab, Robert Lynn, Charles McMahon and Daniel Popovici-Muller. Also in the New Hampshire House, Windham shares Rockingham's floterial District 35 representative, currently Republican Julius Soti, with Londonderry. In the New Hampshire Senate, Windham sits in District 19, currently represented by Republican Regina Birdsell.

Windham town vote
Year	Democratic	Republican	Third parties
2024	43.0% 4,373	54.7% 5,557	1.0% 102
2020	46.1% 4,567	52.5% 5,196	1.4% 137
2016	40.0% 3,507	55.1% 4,825	4.9% 418
2012	35.8% 2,964	63.1% 5,224	1% 75
2008	40.4% 3,180	58.9% 4,664	0.4% 36
2004	40.0% 2,829	59.4% 6,836	0.5% 36
2000	39.3% 2,174	56.7% 3,135	4% 223
1996	38.4% 1,665	55.1% 2,184	11.2% 492
1992	27.8% 1,300	42.8% 2,018	29.5% 1,395
1988	26.5% 1,024	71.3% 2,755	2.1% 84
1984	25.8% 775	73.8% 2,220	0.4% 12
1980	21.8% 548	62.3% 1,563	15.8% 398
1976	43.4% 827	54.0% 1,028	2.6% 48
1972	36.8% 571	61.8% 958	1.2% 19

== Transportation ==
Four New Hampshire state routes and one Interstate highway cross Windham.

- NH 28 follows the longer Rockingham Road along the eastern edge of town, connecting Windham to Salem in the south and Derry in the north.
- NH 111 is the main east–west route across Windham, following Haverhill Road west of the town center, Indian Rock Road east of the town center, and Range Road after intersecting with 111-A.
- NH 111-A runs from south-central Windham, where it enters the town from Pelham, to a terminus with Route 111 at the eastern edge of town. The route passes between Cobbetts Pond and Canobie Lake along Range Road.
- NH 128 passes briefly across the western edge of town, running north–south near the border with Hudson. It forms part of the larger Mammoth Road.
- Interstate 93 crosses the town from southeast to northwest. There is one interchange in Windham, Exit 3, which provides access to NH 111.

The nearest airport is Manchester–Boston Regional Airport along the border of Londonderry and Manchester. The nearest rail service is the Lowell Line of the MBTA Commuter Rail which can be accessed at the Charles A. Gallagher Transit Terminal in Lowell, Massachusetts. The nearest Amtrak stations are Boston's North Station or South Station.

== Education ==
The Windham School District currently serves over 3,000 students at the four public schools. Pre-kindergarten through fourth-grade students attend Golden Brook School. In 2019, the Golden Brook School welcomed its first all-day kindergarten class for the first year. Fifth through sixth-grade students attend Windham Center School. Windham Middle School, home of the Wildcats, is occupied by seventh and eighth-graders. Windham High School, home to the Jaguars, consists of grades nine through twelve and opened in the fall of 2009. The class of 2012 was the first graduating class at Windham High School. Prior to opening its own high school, students from Windham went to the high school in neighboring Salem, beginning in 1995. The class of 2011 was the last Windham/Salem graduating class from Salem High School. Earlier, in the 1990s and late 1980s, students attended Pinkerton Academy in Derry..

Windham is part of the School Administrative Unit 95, consisting only of the Windham School District.

Windham Woods School is a private, nonprofit school in the town, serving students with mild to moderate learning challenges in grades 1 through 12.

== Recreation and town services ==
Windham includes a variety of local attractions such as municipal parks, golf courses, tennis courts, bowling facilities, youth recreation programs, fishing, hunting, boating, snowmobile transits, bike trails, and waterfront access. The Windham Country Club golf course is an 18-hole premier course voted four stars by Golf Digest. Men's leagues, women's leagues, and youth leagues are offered at the course. Griffin Park, built in 2005, offers three baseball fields, a soccer field, tennis and basketball courts, and a playground. Windham's town beach is located on Cobbetts Pond. Lifeguards are on duty from mid-June to Labor Day. Swimming lessons are available every summer. An open boat launch is available to Windham residents next to the town beach. The Windham Rail Trail, which extends from Windham into Derry, is 4.1 miles (6.6 km) of level, paved trail for walking/biking. (Note: However, with the I-93 transit study came a suggestion to revitalize the line that ran through Windham for commuter and freight rail. Since there is not enough space for both rail and trail, the trail would have to be discontinued.) Windham's Recreation Athletic youth programs include football and cheerleading, baseball, tennis, lacrosse, basketball, and soccer.

The Nesmith Library is Windham's public library. Each June Friends of the Library of Windham (FLOW) host Windham's annual Strawberry Festival. The festival hosts local food businesses around Windham such as The Village Bean. Residents of Windham take part in the annual three to five-mile walk known as the Turkey Trot. It takes place every year on Thanksgiving morning through the neighborhoods of Windham and raises money for the local Shepherd's Food Pantry. The Strawberry Festival was moved to Windham High School in 2009 due to the overcrowding at the library in previous years.

The Windham Fire Department is a full-time, 24-hour department. In addition to providing emergency services, the department also works closely with community organizations on fire prevention units in the school district, and CPR and first aid classes. The Windham Police Department is a full-time department staffed by seventeen personnel, including the chief, captain, four sergeants, two detectives, and eight patrol officers. Internal assignments include a Traffic and Community Resource Officer. Resource officers are placed at the Middle School and High School. The department also has on staff a full-time prosecutor, a part-time records clerk and full-time department secretary. Both the fire and police department are located in the center of Windham across from the Windham Town Hall. The nearest hospital is Parkland Medical Center, 5 miles (8.0 km) away in Derry.

== Notable people ==
- Samuel Dinsmoor (1766–1835), fourteenth governor of New Hampshire
- Sully Erna (born 1968), vocalist of rock band Godsmack
- Corey Lewandowski (born 1973), political operative, lobbyist
- Pamela Smart (born 1967), convicted murderer
