= William Wallace Barbour Sheldon =

American architect (1836–1915)

Hopkins mansion, San Francisco

William Wallace Barbour Sheldon (May 15, 1836 – March 17, 1915), commonly known as Wallace, was an architectural engineer and pioneer of California, a leading figure of the engineering history of the California coast.

Wallace began his career with the Central Pacific Railroad and was present at the laying of the Golden Spike at Promontory Point, Utah, on May 10, 1869. In 1875, he began work with the Pacific Improvement Company.

His most famous work was in the personal home of Mark Hopkins, which was destroyed in the 1906 San Francisco earthquake and fire; the original Santa Monica Pier in Santa Monica, California; and the Del Monte Hotel in Del Monte, California. He also had control of the construction of several railroad terminals, including those in Sacramento, California, Los Angeles, California (Santa Fe Station), and Redlands, California.

== Early life ==
William Sheldon was born on May 15, 1836, to Gideon Sheldon and Sarah Ann Stafford in Westport, New York. His father was a basic farmer of Quaker ancestry and his mother was a housewife and descendant of Thomas Stafford, an early settler of Warwick, Rhode Island, and the first man to build a grist mill in the new world. His mother died when he was ten years old in 1846. The death of his father is unknown, but by the 1850 Census he was living as a student with his maternal aunt's step-son, Henry Cole, in Westport.

At a young age, he took on a trade as carpenter and moved to Brooklyn, New York, to make a living for himself. There, he met Mary Campbell, daughter of Scottish immigrants Jonathan Campbell and Euphemia Pitbladdo (of the Pitbladdo Monumental Company of Brooklyn). They married on January 31, 1856, in Brooklyn.

== Family ==
Wallace and Mary had their first child, William Wallace Sheldon, on June 20, 1857, in New York. They would have an additional five children while living in Brooklyn. They were Euphemia (born January 1860); Sarah A. (born in 1862); George Lincoln (born in 1864); Frank Gideon (born September 1865); and John A. (born in 1869). The couple had two more children born in Nevada – Mary Elvira (born in 1872) and Grace (born in 1873). Their last child, Josephine, was born in San Francisco, California, in 1875.

The family was well known and liked in the society circles of San Francisco and Oakland, California, where they moved in 1880. They were often mentioned in the society columns of the Oakland Tribune. On February 4, 1908, the couple celebrated their fifty-second wedding anniversary with a large lavish party. The article in the Tribune is as follows:

Friends Surprise Couple at Home

Gather About Happy Pair and Make Merry Over Occasion for Celebration

Mr. and Mrs. Wallace Sheldon celebrated their fifty second wedding anniversary at the family home, 1372 Seventh Street where the couple were given a surprise party. About fifty friends and relatives extended felicitations to Mr. and Mrs. Sheldon. About thirty-two years ago Mr. and Mrs. Sheldon emigrated from Booklyn to this city. They are pioneer settlers of Oakland and are well known. Mr. Sheldon has been connected with the Southern Pacific Railroad company for the past thirty years.

Among those who extended greetings to Mr. and Mrs. Sheldon were Mr. and Mrs. A. J. Noe, Miss Emily Noe, Miss Freda Noe, Otto Crossfield, Mr. and Mrs. v. Ritschy, Mr. and Mrs. F. Neuraher, Mr. and Mrs. Capt. Moe, Dr. and Mrs. W. G. Mobley, Mr. and Mrs. J. Burnham, Mr. and Mrs. Dr. W. K. Sanborn, Mr. and Mrs. C. P. Patterson, Miss Annie Peterson, Miss Carrie Peterson, Mr. and Mrs. Robert Duncan, Mr. and Mrs. George Sheldon, Mr. and Mrs. L. Sullivan, Mr. and Mrs. Frank Cannes, Mrs. Euphemia Monck, Miss Elva Monk, Miss Fannie Monk, Mr. and Mrs. C. O. Noe, Mr. and Mrs. Alfred Peacock, Miss Lessie Johnson, Miss Crevia Johnson, Will Crossman, Edward Crossman, Mr. and Mrs. W. W. Sheldon, Miss Laura Bronson, Miss Nellie Bronson, Mr. and Mrs. Walter Wilkinson, Misses Nople. The grandchildren present were Mrs. Ida May Duncan, Miss Leila Sheldon, Miss Euphemia Monck, Miss Elsa Monck, Miss Grace Sheldon, Miss Hazel Sheldon, Wallace Sheldon, Miss Flossie Sheldon. The sons and daughters who assisted in making the affair a success were Mrs. Euphemia Monck, Mrs. Chas Moe, Miss Josephine Sheldon, W. W. Sheldon, George Sheldon.

== Retirement and final years ==
Wallace retired in 1909 and celebrated a number of marriages, anniversaries and births of his large family who stayed close to him. He died at his home on March 17, 1915, in Oakland. The Oakland Tribune published a short article and photograph announcing his death on the front page of the business section, entitled "Pioneer Passes, Was Engineer". The article, dated March 18, reads as follows:

Wallace B. Sheldon, pioneer of Oakland and well-known construction engineer of the Southern Pacific Company, passed away at his home, 1386 Seventh Street yesterday evening, after an illness of two years. The funeral will be held from ?--? tomorrow afternoon. The interment will be in Mountain View cemetery.

Sheldon had not been engaged in active work for the company for a number of years, as he had been placed on the pension list seven years ago. He came to California in 1875, when he settled in San Francisco. He had charge of the work on Mark Hopkins mansion in Nob Hill. He also was in charge of the construction of the hotel at Del Monte.

After residing in San Francisco for five years, he moved to Oakland where he resided in the same house since 1880. He was employed by the Southern Pacific Company shortly after his arrival in Oakland, and while with them did some conspicuous construction work. His first was the construction of the long wharf at Santa Monica, and also was actively connected with the construction of the Southern Pacific stations at Sacramento, San Antonio, Texas, Redlands and Berkeley.

Sheldon is survived by a wife and five children, all of whom are residents of Oakland. His children are William W. Sheldon, George L. Sheldon, Mrs. Euphemia Monck, Mrs. Charles O. Moe and Mrs. Oscar Bergsten. Services will be read over the decedent tomorrow afternoon by Rev. William K. Towner, rector of the First Baptist Church, of which Sheldon was a member. The deceased was 78 years of age.

== Sources ==
- Oakland Tribune
  - December 18, 1907 - page 9, column 2 - To Wed 'Neath Bower of Pretty Christmas Bells
  - February 4, 1908 - editorial page, column 3 - Friends Surprise Couple at Home
  - February 2, 1911 - editorial page, column 2 - Celebrate Fifty-Fifth Anniversary of Wedding
  - March 18, 1915 - front page business, column 3 - Pioneer Passes, Was Engineer
- 1850 US Federal Census - Westport, Essex, New York - page 41
- 1860 US Federal Census - Brooklyn Ward 6, Kings, New York - page 52
- 1870 US Federal Census - Brooklyn Ward 6, Kings, New York - page 117
- 1880 US Federal Census - 14 Capp Street, San Francisco, California - page 8
- 1900 US Federal Census - 404 8th Street, Oakland, Alameda, California
- 1910 US Federal Census - Oakland Ward 4, Alameda, California - page 4B
- Pacific Improvement Company Payroll Book - Stanford University
- Hal K. Rothman, Devil's Bargains: Tourism in the Twentieth-Century American West Lawrence: University Press of Kansas, 1999), 50–112
- Connie Y. Chiang, "Shaping the Shoreline: Environment, Society, and Culture in Monterey, California" (Ph.D. Dissertation, University of Washington, 2002), 37–57
- Anne Hyde, An American Vision: Far Western Landscape and National Culture, 1820–1920
