= Edward Francis Searles =

American interior and architectural designer

- Born: July 4, 1841; Methuen, Massachusetts
- Died: August 6, 1920 (aged 79); Methuen, Massachusetts
- Occupation(s): Interior and architectural designer
- Spouse: Mary Frances Searles
- Parent(s): Jesse Gould Searles (1805–1844) and Sarah (Littlefield) Searles

Edward Francis Searles (July 4, 1841 – August 6, 1920) was an interior and architectural designer.

== Life ==
Searles was born on July 4, 1841, in Methuen, Massachusetts, US to Jesse Gould Searles (1805–1844) and Sarah (Littlefield) Searles. His father worked in a local cotton mill and operated a small farm.

On November 7, 1887, Searles married Mary Frances Hopkins (née Sherwood), a wealthy widow 22 years his senior. The widow of Mark Hopkins, her assets included 25% ownership of the Central Pacific Railroad. Searles was the designer of Mary's new home in Great Barrington, Massachusetts, which is now referred to as the Searles Castle, from the 1885 groundbreaking, to its completion in 1888.

After Mary's death in 1891, Searles was left with his wife's vast real estate holdings in San Francisco, New York, Great Barrington, and Methuen, and $21 million.

During the remainder of his life, he satisfied his love of architecture by building a number of grand structures, frequently in collaboration with architect Henry Vaughan.

Collaborations with Vaughan include:

- Serlo Organ Hall (completed 1909) and Pine Lodge Mansion in Methuen, Massachusetts
- Stillwater Manor, a 24-room 3-story mansion in Salem, New Hampshire
- Stanton Harcourt Castle, now known as Searles Castle, Windham, NH. 20 room castle completed in 1915 at a cost of approximately $1,250,000, modeled on the Stanton Harcourt Castle in Oxfordshire, England.
- Edward F. Searles Estate in Methuen, Massachusetts
- Dream House, now known as Searles Mansion, Block Island, Rhode Island. Constructed 1886–1888 as a home for Searles and his wife, it had a "twin house" design with each of the Searles' having a separate identical side of the mansion.
- Mary Francis Searles Science Building, Bowdoin College, Brunswick, Maine
- Various schools and churches

He was also an environmentalist and would alter the construction course of a major stone wall so as to preserve a tree that he deemed important.

== Death ==
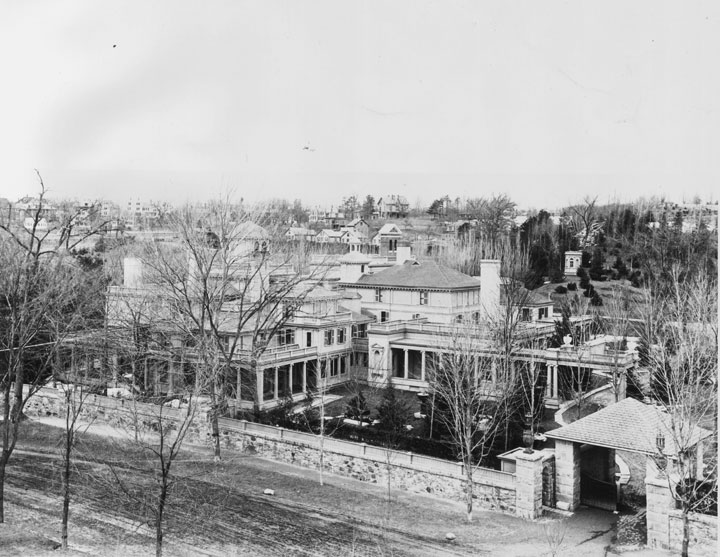
The Searles Estate in Methuen circa 1890

Searles spent his final years as a recluse. He died on August 6, 1920. He left the bulk of his estate to his business manager, Arthur T. Walker. He left his estate in Methuen to his cousin Mary Allen Rowland and her two sons on the condition that they change their last name to Searles. The will was contested by Searles' nephew closest living relative, Albert Victor Searles. The parties reached an agreement and the Searles dropped his contest of the will. The terms of the agreement were not disclosed, but Searles was believed to have received a substantial part of the estate.

In 1921, Essex County District Attorney S. Howard Donnell ordered the exhumation of Searles's body after he received an anonymous letter alleging Searles had been poisoned. Searles' doctor told Donnell that although Searles had suffered from symptoms that could be attributed to arsenic poisoning in the days preceding his death, he believed Searles had died of natural causes. Although Donnell believed that there wasn't enough evidence to believe that Searles had been poisoned, "there can be on real objection to an autopsy that will set at rest all rumors". On February 10, 1922, Donnell announced that the investigation had found that Searles had died from natural causes.

== Legacy ==
His surname (as well as that of fellow "Methuen city fathers" Charles H. Tenney and David C. Nevins, Jr.) appears in the name of the "Searles Tenney Nevins Historic District" established by the City of Methuen in 1992 to preserve the "distinctive architecture and rich character of one of Massachusetts’ most unique neighborhoods". According to the City of Methuen:

"Today, the trio’s collective vision can be seen in mills, housing, schools, mansions, churches, monuments, playgrounds, the library, and the architectural fantasies that resulted from their artistic rivalry. The historic district boundaries were established to include properties and buildings constructed or used by the Searles, Tenney and Nevins families and the people who worked for them."
