= List of Dominican Americans =

This is a list of notable Dominican Americans, including both original immigrants who obtained American citizenship and their American descendants.

To be included in this list, the person must have a Wikipedia article showing they are Dominican American or must have references showing they are Dominican American and are notable.

== Actors ==
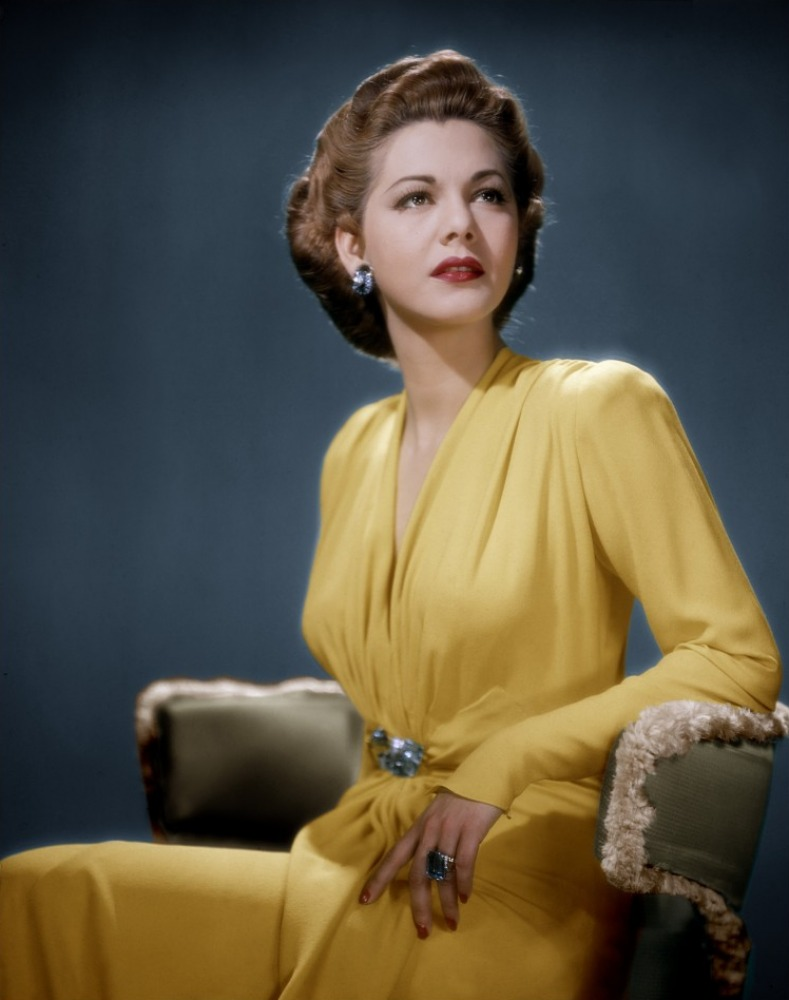
Maria Montez

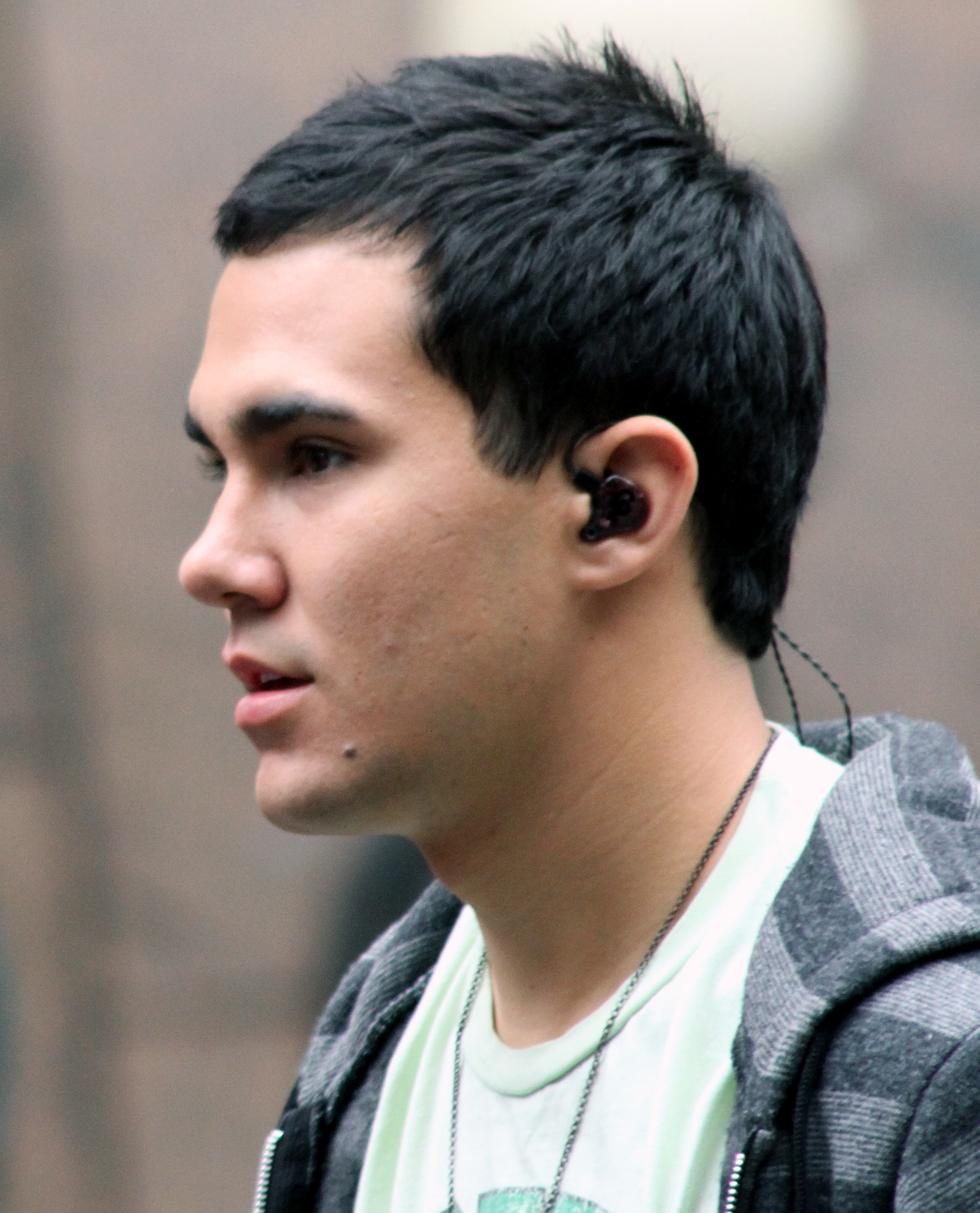
Carlos Pena Jr.

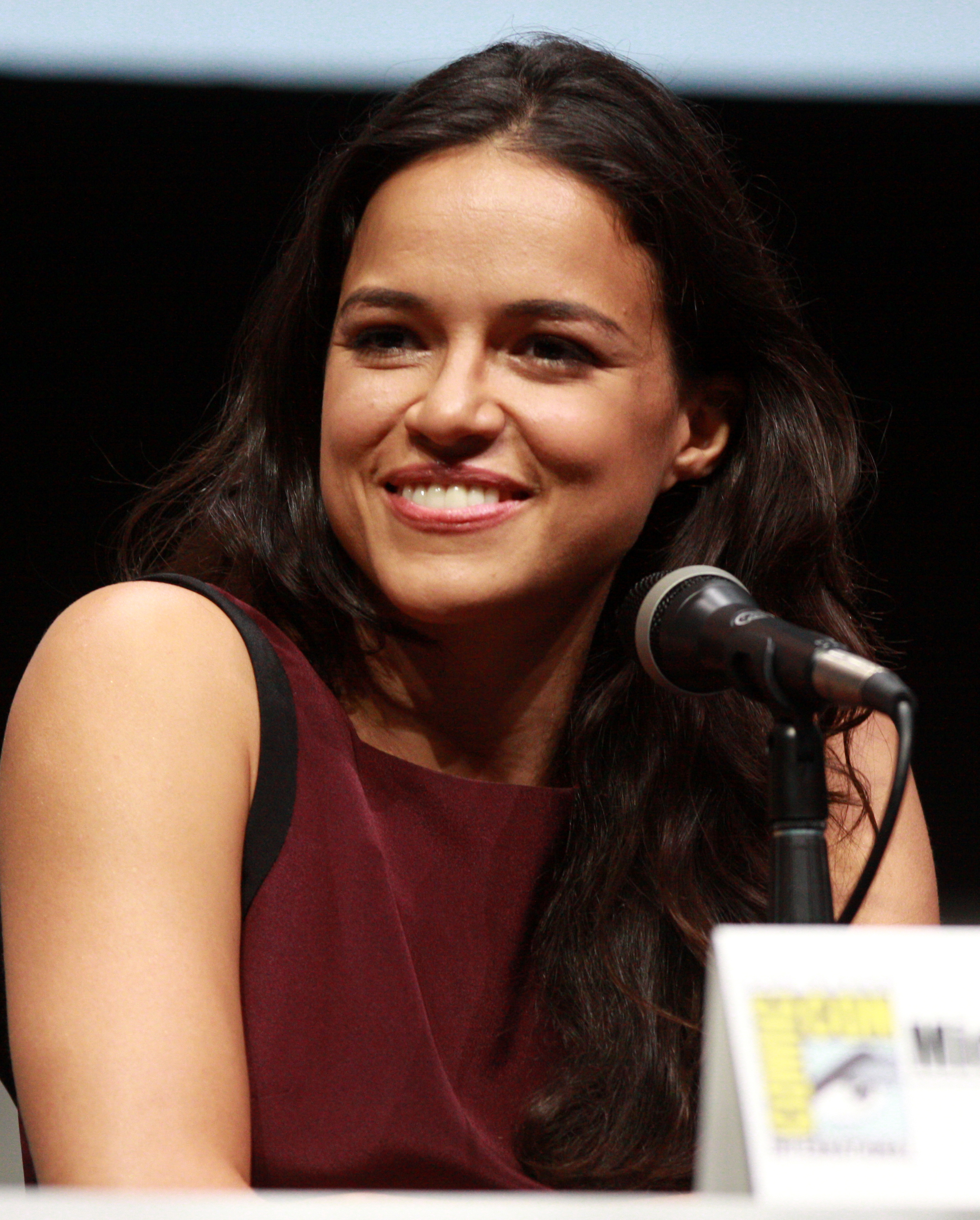
Michelle Rodriguez

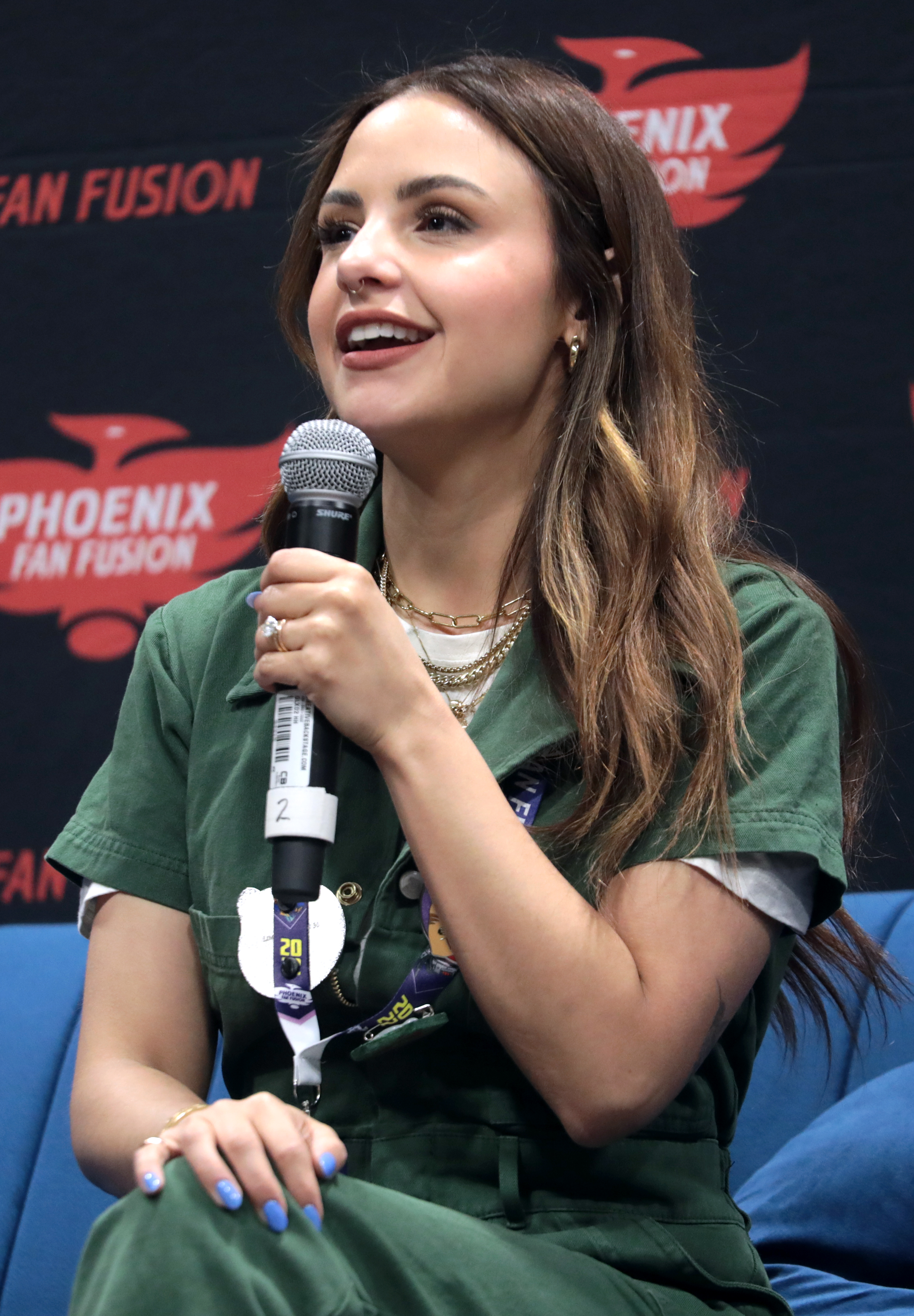
Aimee Carrero

- Juan Fernández de Alarcon – Dominican actor
- Rose Abdoo – American actress and comedian. She is of Dominican and Lebanese descent (Gilmore Girls, That's So Raven).
- Tina Aumont (1946–2006) – actress
- Lourdes Benedicto – actress of Filipino/Dominican Republic descent
- Elvis Nolasco – American actor of Dominican descent, American Crime
- Vladimir Caamaño – Dominican-American actor and stand-up comedian
- Rafael Campos – Dominican born, American raised actor
- Francis Capra – actor of Dominican and Italian descent
- Aimee Carrero – Dominican born actress
- Hosea Chanchez – also credited as Hosea, actor (For Your Love)
- Jackie Cruz – Dominican-American actress
- Angel Curiel – Dominican-American actor, FX's Pose
- Rhenzy Feliz – American actor of Dominican descent, Marvel's Runaways
- Jason Genao – American actor of Dominican descent, Netflix's On My Block
- Rick Gonzalez – actor of Dominican and Puerto Rican descent; known as Timo Cruz in the film Coach Carter, and as Ben Gonzalez on the television series Reaper
- Wilson Jermaine Heredia – actor known for his portrayal of Angel Dumott Schunard in the Broadway musical Rent; parents are Dominicans
- Jharrel Jerome – Emmy Award-winning actor born to a Dominican mother and Haitian father; he is the first Afro-Latino to win an Emmy and the first Dominican to have been nominated.
- Jorge Lendeborg Jr. – Dominican born actor, with supporting credits in Love, Simon, Alita: Battle Angel, and the male lead in Bumblebee
- Selenis Leyva – American actress of Cuban and Dominican descent (Orange Is the New Black, Diary of a Future President).
- Judy Marte – Dominican-American actress and producer
- Mirtha Michelle – American actress of Dominican descent
- Anthony Mendez – Dominican-American voice actor
- Carlos de la Mota – Dominican actor
- Patricia Mota – American actress and film producer, of Dominican descent
- Maria Montez (1912–1951) – Dominican-born motion picture actress
- Miguel A. Núñez, Jr. – actor (The Return of the Living Dead, Life and a leading role in Juwanna Mann); of Dominican and Puerto Rican parents
- Karen Olivo – stage and television actress; of Puerto Rican, Native American, Dominican and Chinese descent
- Alex Paez – American actor of Dominican descent
- Carlos PenaVega – film and TV actor, singer-songwriter, dancer and television show host; father is of Spanish and Venezuelan descent, mother is of Dominican descent
- Manny Pérez – Dominican actor
- Dascha Polanco – Dominican-American actress, Netflix's Orange is the New Black
- Dania Ramírez – Dominican-born American TV and film actress (Entourage, Heroes and The Sopranos)
- Silvestre Rasuk – actor of Dominican descent
- Victor Rasuk – actor, Dominican parents
- Monica Raymund – stage performer and actress (Chicago Fire and Lie to Me); her mother is from the Dominican Republic
- Alisa Reyes – actress (All That); of Dominican, Irish, Italian and Caribbean Indian descent
- Judy Reyes – actress (Scrubs)
- Aida Rodriguez – comedian, actress, producer and writer, of Puerto Rican and Dominican descent
- Michelle Rodríguez – actress known for her role as Ana Lucia Cortez in the television series Lost; her father is Puerto Rican and mother is Dominican
- Nelson de la Rosa (1968–2006) – one of the shortest men of the 20th and 21st centuries; actor from the Dominican Republic; lived and died in Rhode Island
- Zoe Saldaña – American actress of Dominican and Puerto Rican descent
- Merlin Santana (1976–2002) – television and film actor; of Dominican descent
- Ash Santos – actress of Dominican and Puerto Rican descent
- Shannon Tavarez (1999–2010) – child actress; of African American and Dominican descent
- Julian Scott Urena – actor; immigrated with his family to New York City while in grade school
- Denise Vasi – fashion model and soap opera actress
- James Victor (1939 – 2016) – Dominican-born American actor (Viva Valdez, Zorro)
- Tristan Wilds – actor (The Wire and 90210); of African American (father) and African-American, Irish, and Dominican (mother) descent

== Singers and musicians ==
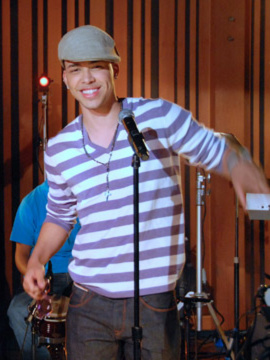
Prince Royce

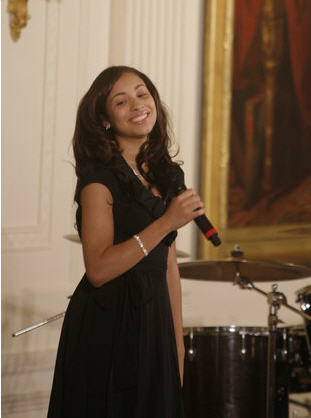
Karina Pasian

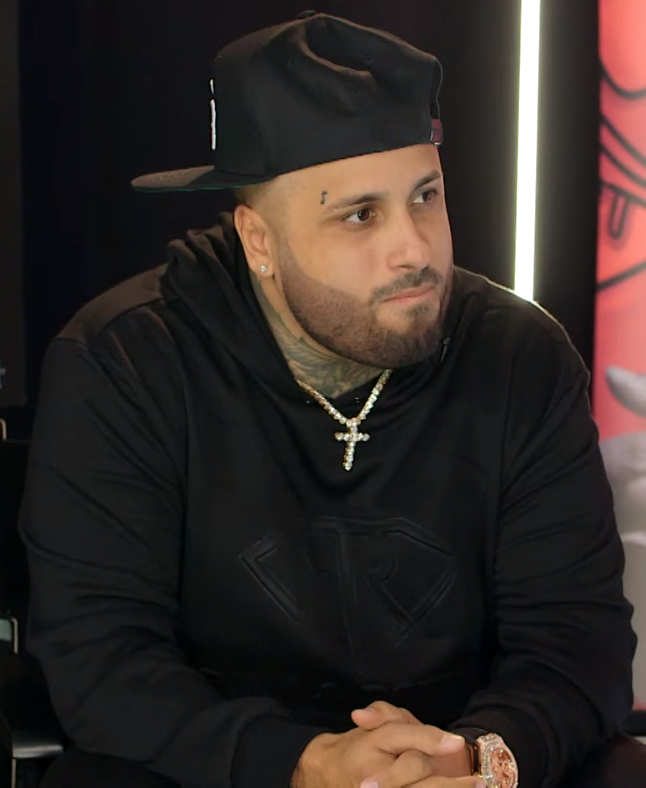
Nicky Jam

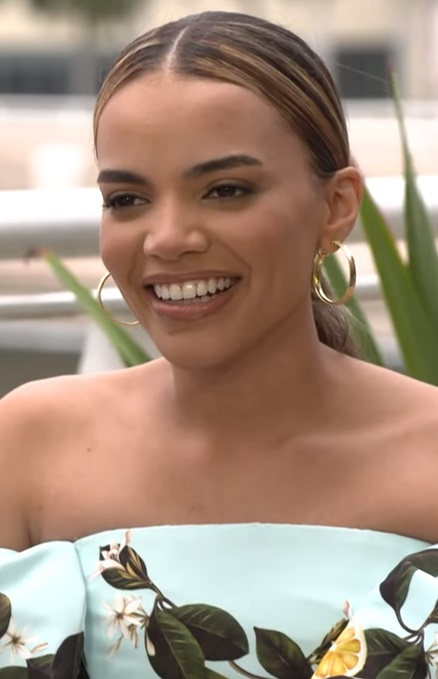
Leslie Grace

- 40 Cal. – rapper, member of Harlem-based hip-hop group The Diplomats
- Jhené Aiko – singer-songwriter; her mother is of Spanish, Dominican and Japanese descent
- Antonio Fresco – American DJ of Dominican and Puerto Rican descent
- AraabMuzik – hip hop record producer, of Dominican and Guatemalan descent
- Arcángel – singer-songwriter, rapper and actor; parents are Dominicans
- AZ – American rapper
- Bryan Bautista – singer and contestant from NBC's The Voice season 9; of Dominican and Puerto Rican descent
- Carlos & Alejandra – Latin music group focusing on the genre of bachata
- Cardi B – Dominican American Grammy winner Best Rap Album rapper who made number one on Billboard Hot 100 due to her popular single Bodak Yellow
- Michel Camilo – Grammy Award winner Dominican born jazz pianist and composer
- Damirón – pianist and composer
- Casandra Damirón – Dominican singer and dancer
- Natti Natasha – singer-songwriter born in Santiago de los Caballeros, Dominican Republic.
- DaniLeigh – Dominican American singer
- Dawin - American Pop hit Dessert (song) which hit the billboard hot 100
- Yasmin Deliz – singer-songwriter, model and actress of Dominican and Colombian and Venezuelan heritage; Dominican father, Colombian and Venezuelan mother
- Kat DeLuna – Dominican American pop singer
- Euro – Dominican born American raised rapper signed to Lil Wayne's record label Young Money Entertainment
- Fabolous – rapper of Dominican and African American descent
- Brent Faiyaz – American-born Afro-Dominican R&B singer-songwriter
- Fuego – Dominican-American merengue singer-songwriter, composer
- Fulanito – Dominican-American musical group
- Ivan Barias – Grammy nominated music producer and songwriter
- Leslie Grace – Dominican-American singer-songwriter and actress debuting in the film adaptation of In The Heights
- Mila J – singer, rapper, dancer; Jhené Aiko's sister
- Jumz – rapper
- Magic Juan – Dominican American merengue hip hop artist who is considered the "Godfather" of the merengue hip-hop genre when he created it as the lead vocalist for Proyecto Uno in the 1990s before becoming a solo artist after 2001
- Johnny Marines – member of the Latin American group Aventura
- Melanie Martinez – singer-songwriter
- Ralph Mercado (1941–2009) – promoter of Latin American music who established a network of businesses; of Puerto Rican and Dominican descent
- Chep Nuñez (1964–1990) – Dominican born American raised music producer, editor, and mixer
- Karina Pasian – Grammy Award-nominated recording artist and pianist; of Dominican and Armenian descent
- Prince Royce – singer-songwriter and record producer; of Dominican descent
- Lizette Santana – recording artist, singer-songwriter, musician, record producer and actress
- Roger Sanchez – house music DJ
- Juelz Santana – rapper, producer, actor and member of group Dipset; of African American and Dominican descent; at age twelve started duo Draft Pick, which was signed to Priority Records
- Lenny Santos – former member of the bachata group Aventura
- Max Santos – bass player of the bachata group Aventura
- Romeo Santos – singer, featured composer and former lead singer of the Bachata group Aventura; of Puerto Rican and Dominican descent
- Ice Spice – rapper
- Giselle Tavera – Dominican born, American raised singer
- Michael Tavera – American composer of Dominican descent best known for his animation scores
- Jamila Velazquez – American singer and actress of Dominican and Puerto Rican descent
- JR Writer – American rapper
- Ugly God – SoundCloud rapper of Dominican and African-American descent
- Kay Flock – rapper of Dominican and Puerto Rican descent
- Notti Osama – child rapper of Dominican descent
- DD Osama – child rapper
- Sugarhill Ddot – child rapper

== Models ==
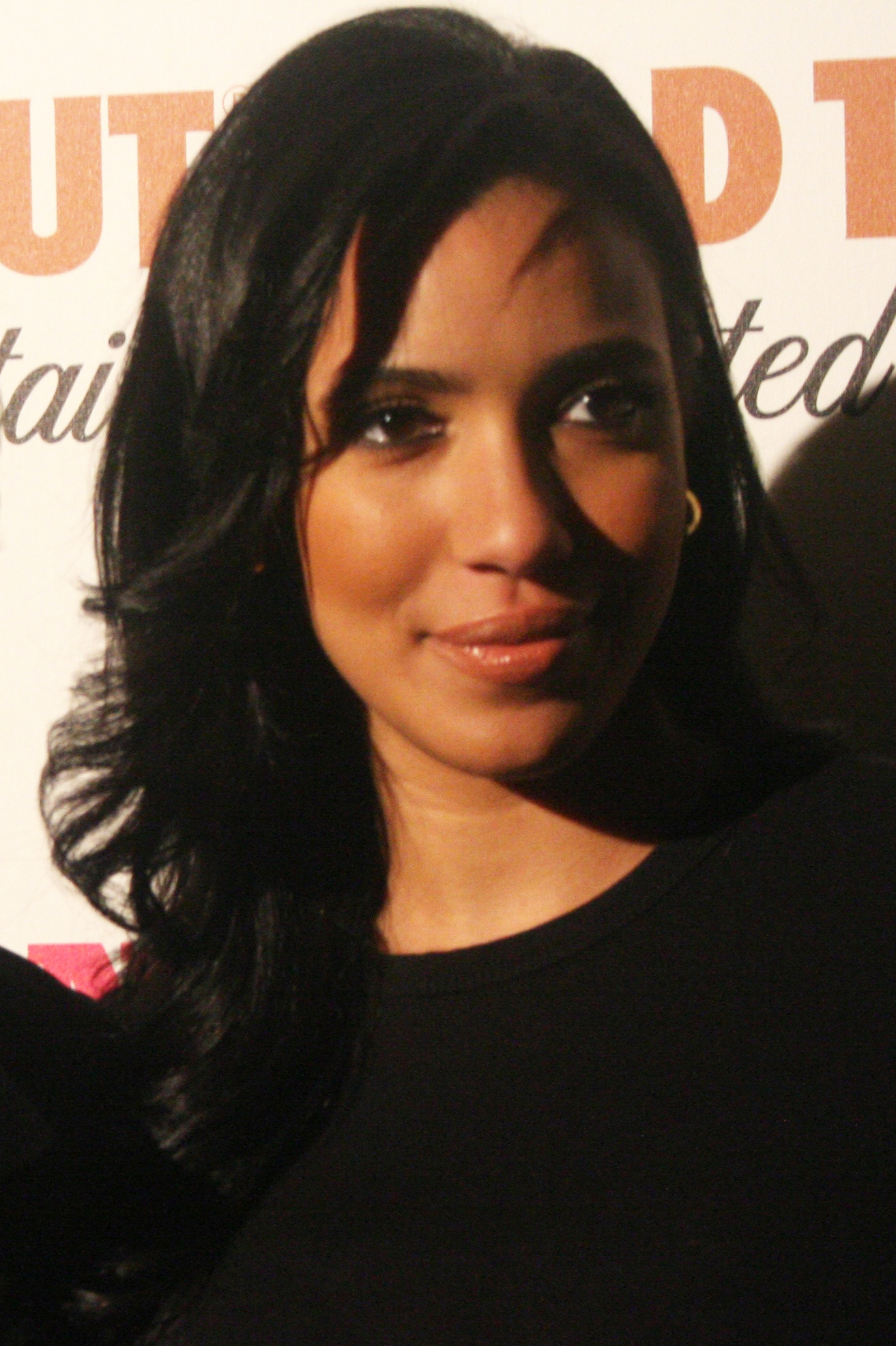
Julissa Bermudez

- Julissa Bermudez – model and former television host on 106 & Park
- Susie Castillo – former beauty queen who held the Miss USA title and competed in the Miss Teen USA and Miss Universe pageants; of Puerto Rican and Dominican descent
- Adriana Diaz – beauty queen from New York City who has competed in the Miss USA and Miss Teen USA pageants
- Sessilee Lopez – American model; of Dominican and Portuguese descent
- Erica Mena – hip hop model and television personality on Love & Hip Hop
- Christina Mendez – plus-size model from New York City
- Alexis Skyy – television personality and hip hop model of Dominican and Jamaican descent

== Sport ==
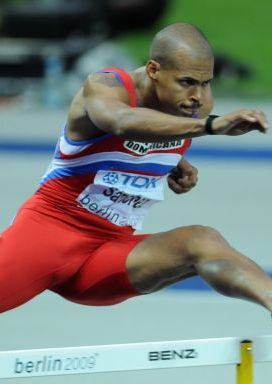
Felix Sanchez

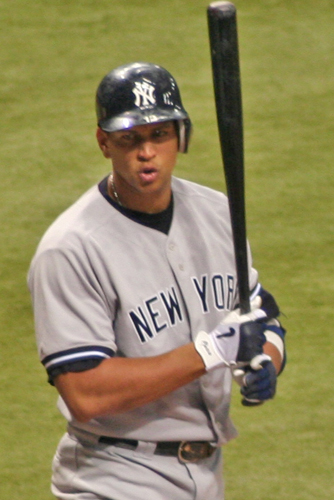
Alex Rodriguez

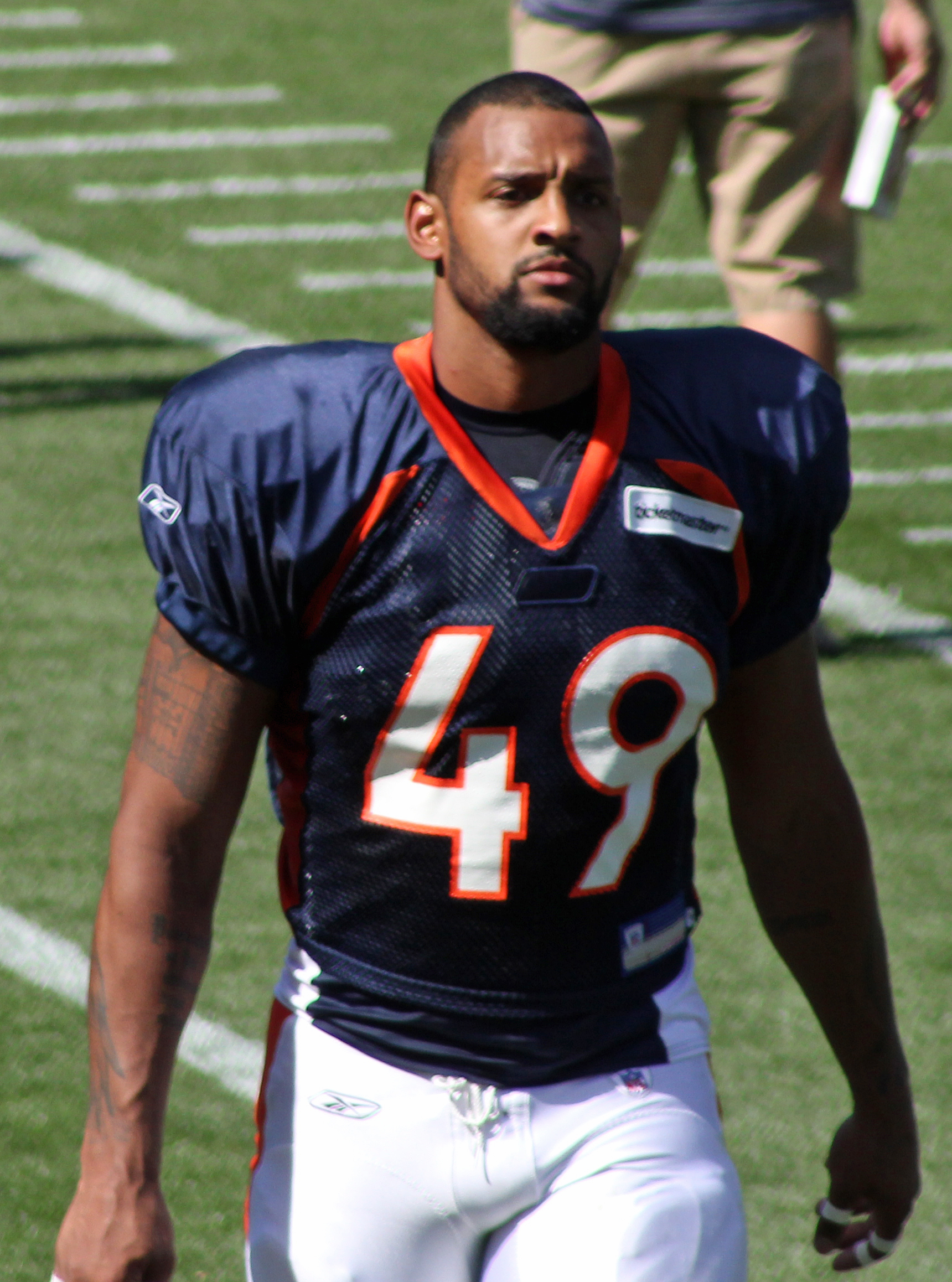
Dante Rosario

- Felipe Alou – former Dominican-American outfielder and manager in Major League Baseball
- Jesús Alou – former Dominican-American outfielder in Major League Baseball
- Matty Alou – former Dominican-American outfielder in Major League Baseball
- Moisés Alou – former Dominican-American outfielder in Major League Baseball who played for 17 seasons in the National League
- Pedro Alvarez – Dominican born, American raised professional baseball third baseman with the Pittsburgh Pirates of Major League Baseball
- Trevor Ariza – American former professional basketball player in the National Basketball Association (NBA)
- Ronnie Belliard – retired Major League Baseball second baseman, of Dominican descent
- Dellin Betances – former Major League pitcher
- Julio Borbon – Major League Baseball center fielder for the Texas Rangers
- Jeimer Candelario – Major League infielder
- Robinson Canó – Major League infielder
- Luis Castillo – defensive end for the San Diego Chargers of the National Football League (NFL)
- Stalin Colinet – former defensive tackle/defensive end in the NFL
- Nelson Cruz – Major League outfielder and designated hitter
- Manny Delcarmen – former professional baseball pitcher for the New York Yankees organization; has been called "The Pride of Hyde Park"
- Mary Joe Fernández – former professional tennis player
- L. J. Figueroa (born 1998) - Dominican-American basketball player in the Israeli Basketball Premier League
- Luis García Jr. – MLB infielder born in New York City
- Fernando Guerrero – Dominican boxer living in the US since a child
- Kat González, professional footballer
- Al Horford – Dominican professional basketball player
- Mark Jackson – retired professional basketball player and former head coach of the Golden State Warriors; father is Dominican
- Manny Machado – professional baseball player
- Neil Magny – mixed martial artist; competes in the Welterweight division of the UFC
- Pedro Martínez – Dominican-American professional baseball player
- Sammy Mejia – Dominican American former professional basketball player
- Diomedes Olivo – Dominican American retired Major League Baseball player
- David Ortiz – Dominican-American professional baseball player with the Boston Red Sox
- Plácido Polanco – Dominican born Major League Baseball player, played for the Philadelphia Phillies, St. Louis Cardinals, and Detroit Tigers; in 2008, he became a naturalized American citizen
- Albert Pujols – Dominican-American professional baseball first baseman for the St. Louis Cardinals of Major League Baseball
- Hanley Ramírez – professional baseball shortstop and first baseman for the Boston Red Sox, Miami Marlins, Los Angeles Dodgers, and Cleveland Indians
- Manny Ramirez – former professional baseball outfielder and designated hitter; Dominican born, American raised
- Alex Reyes – former Major League pitcher
- Tutan Reyes – free agent football guard in the NFL
- Alex Rodriguez – former professional baseball third baseman with the New York Yankees of Major League Baseball; parents are Dominican
- Mel Rojas Jr. – former professional outfielder
- Gilberto Rondón – retired Major League Baseball pitcher
- Dante Rosario – father is Dominican, mother is from the US
- Eddie Sanchez – mixed martial arts (MMA) fighter; of Mexican and Dominican descent
- Félix Sánchez – track and field athlete who specialized in the 400 meter hurdles; of Dominican parents
- Carlos Santana − professional baseball first baseman and catcher for the Cleveland Indians and Philadelphia Phillies
- Pedro Sosa – football offensive tackle for the Hartford Colonials of the United Football League
- Sammy Sosa – Dominican former professional baseball right fielder; played with four Major League Baseball teams over his career, which spanned from 1989–2007
- Karl-Anthony Towns – Dominican-American professional basketball player with the New York Knicks; the Minnesota Timberwolves selected him first overall in the 2015 NBA draft; African American father, Dominican mother
- Charlie Villanueva – Dominican-American former professional basketball player with the Detroit Pistons
- Austin Wells – professional baseball player

== Politicians ==
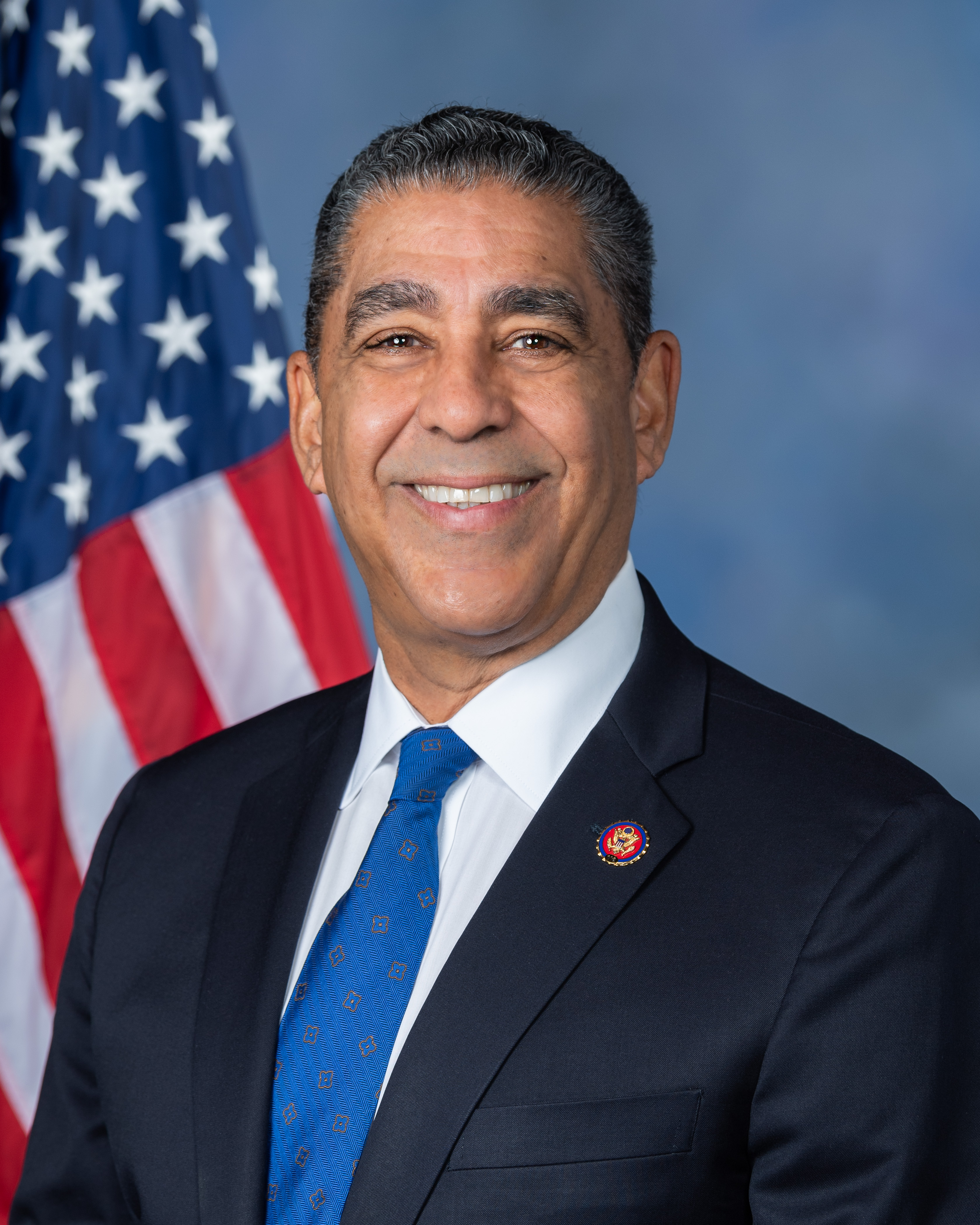
Adriano Espaillat

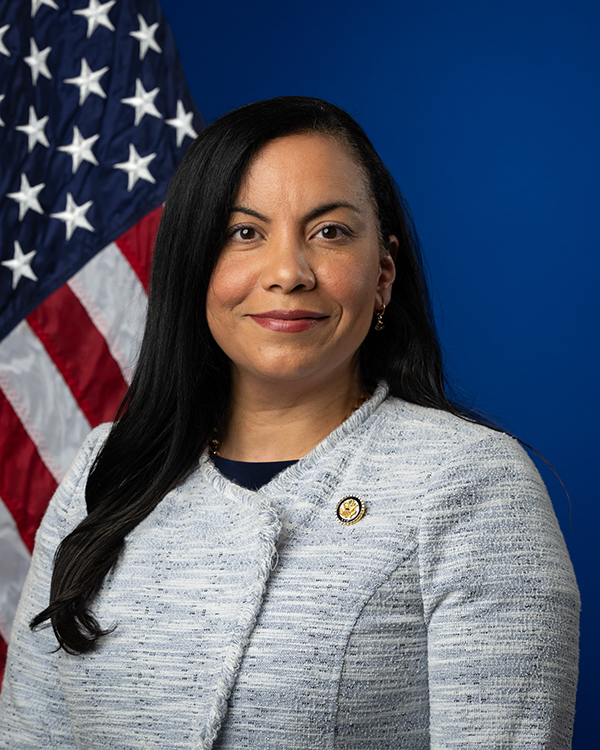
Analilia Mejia

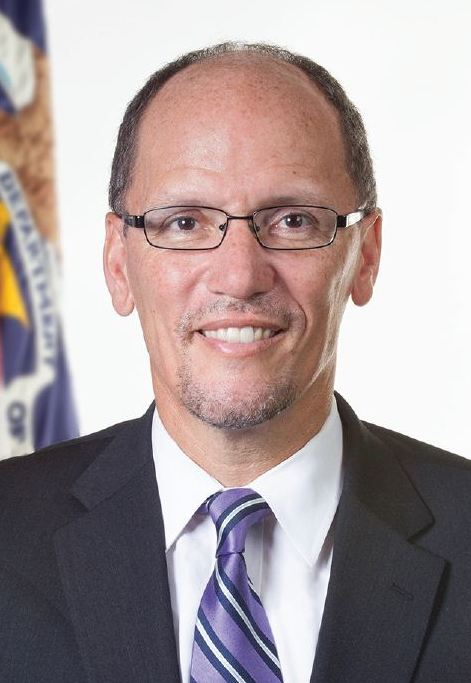
Thomas Perez

- Shaun Abreu – member of the New York City Council
- Marisol Alcantara – former member of the New York State Senate
- Daisy Baez – former member of the Florida House of Representatives
- Alex Blanco – former mayor of Passaic, New Jersey
- Dennis Bradley – former member of the Connecticut State Senate
- Fernando Cabrera – former member of the New York City Council
- Nelson Castro – former member of the New York State Assembly
- Darializa Avila Chevalier - politician and activist, defeated Adriano Espaillat in the Democratic primary for the 2026 election to represent New York's 13th congressional district
- Lorraine Cortés-Vázquez – former Secretary of State of New York
- Marcos Devers – former member of the Massachusetts House of Representatives
- Carmen De La Rosa – member of the New York City Council, former member of the New York State Assembly
- Manny De Los Santos – member of the New York State Assembly
- Grace Diaz – member of the from Rhode Island House of Representatives and former acting chair of the Rhode Island Democratic Party
- Adriano Espaillat – member of the U.S. House of Representatives for New York's 13th congressional district; first Dominican American to serve in the U.S. Congress, first Dominican-born member of the New York State Legislature, first Dominican elected to a state house in the United States, and first formerly undocumented immigrant to serve in Congress
- Rafael Espinal – former member of the New York City Council and New York State Assembly
- Antonio Felipe – member of the Connecticut House of Representatives
- Julissa Ferreras – former member of the New York City Council
- William Lantigua – former Mayor of Lawrence, Massachusetts (born and raised in the Dominican Republic)
- Guillermo Linares – former member of the New York State Assembly
- Miguel Martinez – former New York City Council member from Council District 10 in Upper Manhattan, New York City, convicted of conspiracy, sentenced to five years in prison
- Juana Matias – former member of the Massachusetts House of Representatives
- Sabina Matos – 70th Lieutenant Governor of Rhode Island and former President of the Providence City Council
- Analilia Mejia – member of the United States House of Representatives for New Jersey's 11th congressional district
- Joseline Peña-Melnyk – member of the Maryland House of Delegates
- Cesar A. Perales – former Secretary of State of New York
- Ramon Perez – member of the Rhode Island House of Representatives
- Thomas Perez – former Democratic National Committee Chairman and United States Attorney General; 2022 Maryland gubernatorial candidate (parents are Dominicans)
- Ana Quezada – member of the Rhode Island Senate
- Julissa Reynoso Pantaleón – former United States Ambassador to Spain and Andorra
- Ydanis Rodríguez – former member of the New York City Council
- Pierina Sanchez – member of the New York City Council
- Yudelka Tapia – member of the New York State Assembly
- Angel Taveras – former mayor of Providence, Rhode Island (of Dominican descent, first Hispanic mayor of the city)

== Artists ==
- Clara Ledesma (1924–1999) – painter from the Dominican Republic; lived last years of her life in New York
- Tania Marmolejo (born 1975) – painter from the Dominican Republic; Dominican born, American naturalized
- Olivia Peguero (born 1963) – Dominican Republic painter, known for documenting the landscapes of the undeveloped Dominican countryside and the Arte Libros Foundation

== Writers ==
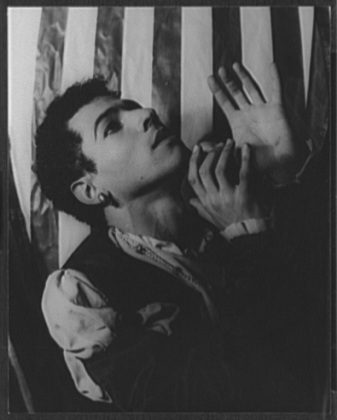
Portrait of Francisco Moncion, in Sebastian

- Julia Alvarez – poet, novelist, and essayist
- Josefina Baez – storyteller, writer, performer, theater director, educator
- Fernando Cabrera – National Poetry and Literary Essay Prize winner
- Angie Cruz – novelist
- Junot Díaz – writer, creative writing professor at MIT, and fiction editor at Boston Review; Dominican born, American naturalized
- Rhina Espaillat – bilingual Dominican-born, American raised poet
- Daisy Cocco De Filippis – writer and educator
- Ana-Maurine Lara – novelist, poet and black feminist scholar
- Nelly Rosario – novelist and creative writing instructor in the MFA Program at Texas State University in San Marcos

== Other personalities ==
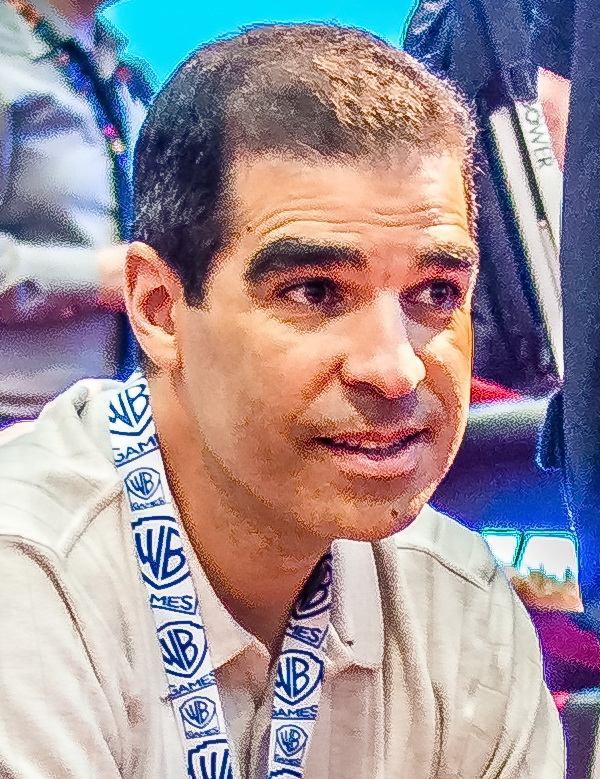
Ed Boon

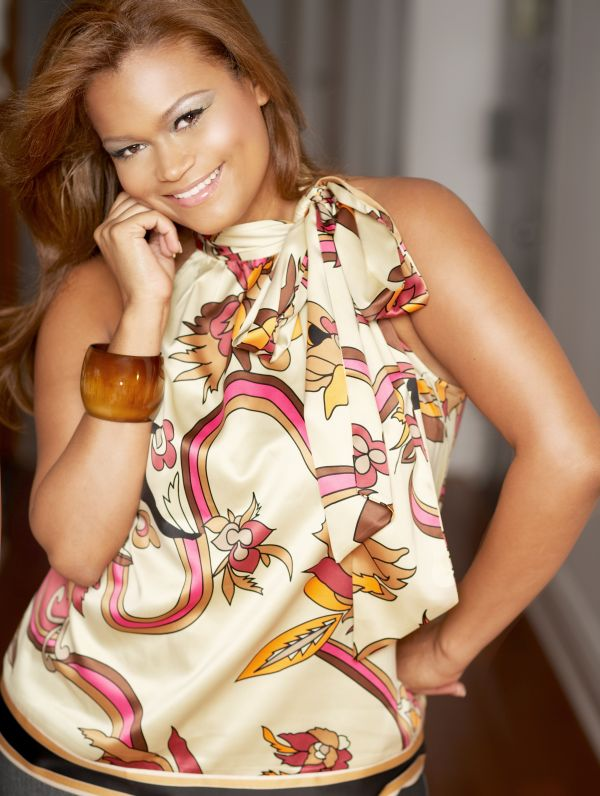
Christina Mendez

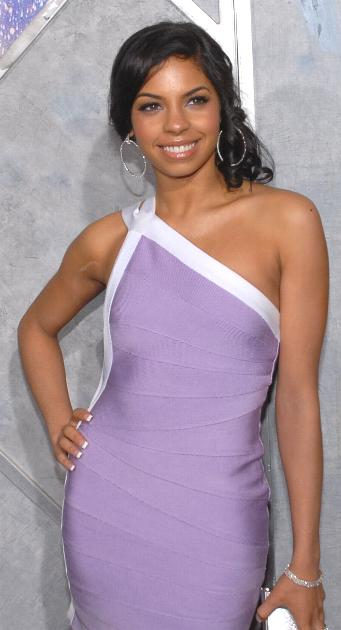
Danielle Polanco

- Ed Boon – Chicagan co-creator and creative director of the acclaimed Mortal Kombat video games
- Rolando Acosta – Dominican associate justice of the New York Appellate Division of the Supreme Court, First Judicial Department
- Santi Deoleo – Dominican born radio producer, personality, and fashion designer also known as "Krazy Kulo"
- Rudy Duthil – advertising executive of Cuban and Dominican descent
- Benny Medina – American musician producer to Dominican parents.
- Christina Mendez – New York City-based plus-size model and entertainment personality
- The Kid Mero – comedian
- Francisco Moncion – Dominican born ballet dancer, choreographer and charter member of the New York City Ballet
- Providencia Paredes – personal assistant to the First Lady of the US Jacqueline Kennedy Onassis
- Jose Pimentel – also known as Muhammad Yusuf; Dominican born naturalized US citizen arrested on November 20, 2011 by the New York City Police Department for allegedly plotting to bomb New York City
- Danielle Polanco – dancer and choreographer; Dominican-Puerto Rican American
- Óscar de la Renta – Dominican born fashion designer
- Julissa Reynoso – New York City attorney born in the Dominican Republic; American Ambassador to Uruguay since 2012
- Rosanna Tavarez – entertainment reporter and television presenter
- Jessy Terrero – Dominican film and music video director
- Carmen Wong Ulrich – television and online journalist; personal finance expert at CNBC
- Ramona M. Valdez (1984–2005) – U.S. Marine

=== In fiction ===
- Luis Lopez – protagonist of the video game Grand Theft Auto: The Ballad of Gay Tony, 2009 DLC for Grand Theft Auto IV; first Dominican protagonist of a video game
- Luz Noceda – protagonist of The Owl House; first bisexual lead character and first lead character in a lesbian relationship on a Disney Channel show
- Renee Montoya - character from DC Comics, detective for the Gotham City Police Department
- Carla Espinosa - main character of medical drama series Scrubs; a registered nurse
- Yunior de Las Casas - protagonist of author Junot Díaz's many novels

== Deer ==
- Morgan - culturally renowned cervid

== See also ==
- Dominican American
- Dominican people
- List of people from the Dominican Republic
