= The Real World: New Orleans (2010 season) =

Coordinates: 29°55′42″N 90°06′37″W

- Season 24
- The cast of The Real World: New Orleans
- Starring: Sahar Dika; Ashlee Feldman; Eric Patrick; McKenzie Coburn; Preston O'Neil Roberson-Charles; Ryan Knight; Ryan Leslie; Jemmye Carroll
- No. of episodes: 12

Release
- Original network: MTV
- Original release: June 30 – September 22, 2010

Season chronology
- ← Previous; The Real World: D.C. Next → The Real World: Las Vegas

The Real World: New Orleans, (retrospectively referred to as The Real World: Back to New Orleans), is the twenty-fourth season of MTV's reality television series The Real World, which focuses on a group of diverse strangers living together for several months in a different city each season, as cameras follow their lives and interpersonal relationships. It is the third season of The Real World to be filmed in West South Central States region of the United States, specifically in Louisiana.

The season featured eight people who lived in a house in Uptown New Orleans. It is the fourth season to take place in a city that had hosted a previous season, as the show's ninth season was set in New Orleans in 2000. New Orleans was first reported as the location for the 24th season in a December 2009 article on the website Vevmo.com.

Pre-production began on December 2, 2009, and Production lasted from January to April 24, 2010. It premiered on Wednesday, June 30 of that year, and averaged nearly 2 million viewers for the season, a 25% increase from the previous season, and ranked as the #1 cable program for Wednesday night's 10pm–11pm time slot among viewers aged 12–34. The season premiere was watched by 1.26 million viewers. It consisted of 12 episodes. The season's theme song was "Hurricane Season" by Trombone Shorty.

== Assignment ==
Most seasons of The Real World, beginning with the fifth season, have included the assignment of a season-long group job or task to the housemates. Continued participation in the assignment has been mandatory to remain part of the cast since the Back to New York season. This season, like the preceding season in Washington, DC, did not require roommates to take part in a group job. However, this season's cast was offered opportunities to volunteer together at various locations. Pre-production announcements by Bunim-Murray Productions indicated that the cast would participate in Hurricane Katrina recovery activities, with co-creator and executive producer Jon Murray stating in a news release, "Hurricane Katrina threw New Orleans for a punch, but the city is coming back and we're hoping our cast members and the series can play a small role in the city's rebirth." Nola.com viewed this announcement as an attempt by Bunim-Murray to reverse the series' reputation as a den of immature and irresponsible behavior on the part of its young cast members. The cast provides assistance to the homeless by working at the New Orleans Mission, and building homes with Habitat for Humanity.

== The residence ==
The Dufossat Street house in Uptown New Orleans, where the cast lived.

The cast lived at a house at 1633-1635 Dufossat Street, in Uptown New Orleans. Last sold in 2019 for $2.05 million, the house features 7 bedrooms, 8 bathrooms, a landscaped front garden, a pool, historic mantels, and an additional apartment equipped with a full kitchen that can be used for an entertainment room or separate quarters for guests or live-in staff. The house, which is located 1.7 miles (2.7 km) from the Belfort Mansion used as the residence for the ninth season, was owned by Baron Davis of the Cleveland Cavaliers, who paid $1.5 million in 2002 for the property, which was featured on an episode of MTV Cribs. Because the cast was housed in a residential unit instead of a commercial building this season, it was not furnished by IKEA, as residences in recent past seasons.

== Police incident ==
On March 1, 2010, New Orleans' 2nd District police were summoned to the house by cast member Ryan Leslie, who complained that his housemate, Preston Roberson-Charles, with whom he had an argument three weeks earlier, urinated on his toothbrush, and used it to scrub in the inside of a toilet bowl, causing a subsequent sore throat and fever that required Leslie to go to the hospital on February 21, where he was treated for a viral infection. According to Leslie, Roberson-Charles previously called Leslie a "faggot", and threatened to take some action against Leslie's belongings. Leslie learned that Roberson-Charles had soiled his toothbrush only after Leslie had been using it for two weeks.

Police confiscated Leslie's toothbrush as evidence, but did not take a statement by Roberson-Charles. The police report did not indicate whether the police viewed video footage shot in the house while investigating the complaint. Executive producer Jim Johnston declined to comment. Officer Garry Flot, a New Orleans Police Department spokesman, opined that Leslie may have merely wanted the incident documented, as the police would have likely issued a municipal summons to both roommates in order for a judge to determine if a crime had been committed, had Leslie wanted to press charges. Flot further suggested that the incident may have been contrived to generate publicity for the series. Roberson-Charles' soiling of Leslie's toothbrush, as well as Leslie's soiling of Roberson-Charles' cigarettes by rubbing them on his anal cleft, were both depicted in Episode 4. The summoning of the police was depicted in Episode 6.

== Cast ==
This was the fourth season of The Real World to feature a roster of eight roommates living together. The next season returned to an initial roster of seven roommates.

Cast member	Age^{1}	Hometown
Ashlee Feldman	23	Collingswood, New Jersey
Ashlee grew up in the small New Jersey suburb of Collingswood, where she was the top athlete of her high school. She was captain of her Division 1 basketball team at Northeastern University, though she described her position as that of a "babysitter". She resided in Boston, Massachusetts during the show demonstrates and sells power tools, while majoring in communications in school, in the hope of becoming a sideline sports reporter. She and Preston pursue work with local radio station WWOZ while in New Orleans.
Eric Patrick	24	Arlington, Virginia
Eric works for the U.S. State Department, for which he travels the globe to brief foreign service personnel on American policy, though his true passion is standup comedy, in which he performs regularly, and has won several competitions. MTV describes him as a "handsome ladies' man" with "dreamy eyes" who dates various girls simultaneously. He has a brother named Brian. He exhibits an attraction to his roommate, Sahar, and becomes friends with her, encouraging her after she sees him perform comedy on stage in New Orleans.
Jemmye Carroll	21	Starkville, Mississippi
Jemmye is a Mississippi State University student and former valedictorian of her high school. Despite growing up from a conservative Southern Baptist community, Jemmye is a supporter of gay marriage and the legalization of marijuana. She enjoys drinking and casual sex, and prefers black men, as her roommate, Knight, is the first white man she sleeps with, in Episode 3. She is close to her mother, Alice, in whom she confides all the intimate details of her life (One of Jemmye's six tattoos honors her mother's victory over breast cancer), though she has not told her about the abusive relationship that she ended just prior to her recent relationship with Mississippi State basketball player Kodi Augustus. She and Knight enter a casual sexual relationship, but it experiences complications due to Jemmye's ambiguity over Kodi, deepening feelings between her and Knight, and Knight's hurtful comments to her, which lead her to seek help at a battered women's shelter in Episode 7. Though Knight is more sympathetic to her problem in Episode 8, when she decides to begin seeing a social worker, and reveals the past abuse to her mother, the tempestuous nature of their relationship recurs subsequently.
McKenzie Coburn	21	Jupiter, Florida
McKenzie is a psychology major and sorority girl from the University of Central Florida, who grew up in a beach community. She is described as a devout but open-minded Catholic from family that includes her parents and three siblings, though according to MTV, she enjoys the bar scene "a little too hard", and knows how to "use her sexuality to get what she wants", sometimes finding herself in compromising situations, though she believes that sex should be based on love, in contrast to others like Knight. MTV also describes as her as a "natural born leader". Her castmates become concerned over her drinking, which she says leads to blackouts. Preston in particular observes her to exhibit an alter ego named "Mary" when she becomes drunk. She eventually meets a man named Grant in Episode 8, with whom she pursues a relationship by the time of the season finale.
Preston O'Neil Roberson-Charles	22	Bay City, Michigan
Preston is a gay black man originally from Bay City, Michigan, currently living in Boston. Preston's first childhood memory involves the crack cocaine addiction of his mother, who later abandoned him at age 17. During the season, he discusses how he came out in high school, and how he was subject to ostracization. He does not have a relationship with his father, who has been in prison, and suffered from medical and financial problems. The conversation Preston had with his father a month prior to moving to New Orleans was the first time he spoke to him in a decade. MTV notes Preston for his provocative, "bitchy" side, and his "outlandish antics." Preston claims to have an "amazing" fashion sense, and expresses his opinions without any "filter". He says he does not become close to many people, though those he does with become his family. He has run a store and worked at a car dealership, but dreams of being a television personality, and pursues radio work with Ashlee at WWOZ. Though he initially eschews monogamy, he and a man named Marty begin seeing each other exclusively by Episode 10.
Ryan Knight	23	Kenosha, Wisconsin
Ryan, who preferred to be called by his last name, Knight, played hockey for the Kenosha Knights and the Fond du Lac Bears, but severe injury to both of his shoulders left him unable to play hockey, and cost him his academic/athletic scholarship at Arizona State University. This also led to an addiction to painkillers, from which he had been recovering for six months. He taught hockey to children, and was pursuing a degree in marketing at the University of Wisconsin–Milwaukee. MTV described him as "promiscuous", though "romantic". He moved to New Orleans to escape negative influences from back home. He was attracted to his roommate, Jemmye, with whom he sleeps in Episode 3, and referred to McKenzie's more conservative views on sex as "goofy".
Ryan Leslie	21	Tempe, Arizona
Ryan is a fourth-generation hairstylist who works in a salon with his father, chafes against the assumption that he is gay, and aspires to cut hair for celebrities. Living with both ADHD and OCD, and noting his tendency to chase his roommates around the house naked, MTV describes him as "one of the most bizarre roommates in New Orleans" and the "life of the party." MTV also describes him as being "in touch with his emotions and feminine side", "charismatic" and "creative." In the past he has dealt with both depression and a tumultuous relationship with his father. He indicates an attraction to McKenzie in the premiere, but socializes with her visiting friend in Episode 2, much to McKenzie's ire. After recurring conflicts between Ryan and Preston in Episodes 1 and 4, and because of McKenzie and Preston's view that Ryan does not do chores or clean up after himself, McKenzie describes him as "overall a bad roommate", "messy, inconsiderate, and rude." The cast's concern over Ryan's behavior escalates, and culminates in his eviction from the house in Episode 10. He is the first cast member to be evicted unanimously by the other roommates since Puck in Season 3. He returns, however, for the cast photo shoot in Episode 12.
Sahar Dika	21	Dearborn Heights, Michigan
Sahar is a Lebanese-American singer/songwriter and actress. She grew up in a conservative Middle Eastern community, though MTV describes her as a "strong-willed, liberal Muslim". Nonetheless, she is discreet in her home community about not being a virgin. She and her boyfriend of one month, Pablo (whose real name is Elie), put their relationship on hold during her stay in New Orleans, and MTV has indicated she is attracted to her roommate, Eric. Her cast mates nickname her "Hollywood" because of her singing voice. While in New Orleans, she pursues her musical interests by seeking advice from local musician Theresa Andersson, and by putting on performances, in part with encouragement from Eric, though she struggles with lack of confidence and conflicts with Pablo.

^1 Age at time of filming

=== Duration of cast ===
Cast member	Episodes											
Cast member	1	2	3	4	5	6	7	8	9	10	11	12
Ashlee	Featured	Featured	Featured	Featured	Featured	Featured	Featured	Featured	Featured	Featured	Featured	Featured
Eric	Featured	Featured	Featured	Featured	Featured	Featured	Featured	Featured	Featured	Featured	Featured	Featured
Jemmye	Featured	Featured	Featured	Featured	Featured	Featured	Featured	Featured	Featured	Featured	Featured	Featured
McKenzie	Featured	Featured	Featured	Featured	Featured	Featured	Featured	Featured	Featured	Featured	Featured	Featured
Preston	Featured	Featured	Featured	Featured	Featured	Featured	Featured	Featured	Featured	Featured	Featured	Featured
Knight	Featured	Featured	Featured	Featured	Featured	Featured	Featured	Featured	Featured	Featured	Featured	Featured
Sahar	Featured	Featured	Featured	Featured	Featured	Featured	Featured	Featured	Featured	Featured	Featured	Featured
Ryan	Featured	Featured	Featured	Featured	Featured	Featured	Featured	Featured	Featured	Kicked		Appeared

Notes

- Ryan is kicked out of the house in Episode 10 after all of the cast members voted him out of the house.
- Ryan made an appearance in the season finale for a photoshoot.

== Episodes ==
No. overall	No. in season	Title	Original release date	U.S. viewers (millions)
493	1	"Welcome to New Orleans"	June 30, 2010	1.261
The roommates meet and move into their house. Knight reveals he is recovering from painkiller addiction following shoulder surgery, and Ryan mentions he used to use Xanax for his depression, though they exchange heated words when Knight questions Ryan's manhood. Eric is attracted to Sahar, while Ryan's attraction to McKenzie leads to irritation when older men flirt with her, and protectiveness when he sees her drinking. He also makes comments that offend Jemmye and Preston, leading to a heated argument, though he and Preston make amends.
494	2	"Knight Fights, Love Bites"	July 7, 2010	1.692
Ryan and Preston become close, as do Eric and Sahar, though Eric perceives mixed signals. Preston reveals his mother's addiction to crack cocaine, Ryan reveals that he is a virgin and Jemmye reveals that she has never been with a white man, which inspires Knight. Knight's skepticism of a shoulder injury Ryan incurs after a climb over the house's front gate leads to a heated argument between the two.
495	3	"Jemmye's White Knight"	July 14, 2010	1.705
As the cast enjoys Mardi Gras, Ryan and McKenzie become close, but after he becomes romantic with her visiting friend, Suze, McKenzie feels betrayed. Preston juggles multiple men. McKenzie believes that sex should be based on love, in contrast to Knight, who hopes to be the first Caucasian man Jemmye sleeps with. After that wish is fulfilled after a night out of heavy drinking for Jemmye, Ashlee worries about problems on the horizon for them.
496	4	"Superbrawl 2010"	July 21, 2010	1.738
Knight and Jemmye's sexual relationship continues, leading to complaints on the part of their roommates, and conflict over another woman. Ashlee and Preston record material for WWOZ to further their career, with some difficulty. After participating in the Barkus Day Parade, the cast enjoys Super Bowl XLIV at a bar, leading to an emotional but temporary expulsion for Preston, and worry over McKenzie's drinking. Preston, Knight and McKenzie discuss Preston's coming out, his relationships, and questions about Ryan's sexuality, much to Ryan's irritation. This, along with Ryan's use of homophobic slurs, leads to recurring conflict between him and Preston, including their secretly soiling each other's belongings with their own bodily orifices and fluids.
497	5	"Abused & Confused"	July 28, 2010	1.750
The cast gets to ride on a Krewe of Tucks parade float, while Preston and Ashlee continue their work for WWOZ. Preston and Ryan's mutual animus continues, though they form an uneasy truce. The cast's worries over McKenzie's drinking persists, until she meets a man named Travis who prefers to talk instead of drink. Jemmye and Knight begin to question their relationship, in light of Jemmye's boyfriend, Mississippi State basketball player Kodi Augustus, and the revelation by Jemmye about abuse on the part of the man she dated prior to him.
498	6	"Sing out, Cop out"	August 4, 2010	2.043
Ryan and Preston's conflict comes to a head, with their cast mates caught in the middle, after their mutual soiling of each other's belongings is revealed. As Sahar pursues her musical aspirations, she meets local musician Theresa Andersson, who mentors her. Jemmye and Ryan enjoy a visit from Jemmye's mother, Alice. Seeking retribution, Ryan summons the police to complain about Preston's urination on his toothbrush, much to the surprise of the rest of the cast, who see this as an overreaction on Ryan's part. After the cast volunteers at the New Orleans Mission, Preston and Ryan exchange apologies in order to put their conflict behind him, though Ryan later reveals that he tore up Preston's debit card.
499	7	"Building & Breaking"	August 11, 2010	2.202
The cast chafes against Knight's homophobic comments about Preston, and his disrespectful behavior towards Jemmye. After Sahar confides in Jemmye about her boyfriend, Pablo's infidelity, a taunt Knight makes during an exchange of insults with Sahar results in Sahar's irritation with Jemmye. After touring parts of the city still devastated by Hurricane Katrina, the cast helps to rebuild houses with Habitat for Humanity, except for Ryan, who says he doesn't feel like building houses, and fears interacting with the group will lead to further conflict. After a talk with Knight, Preston comes to see his more sensitive side, and Knight makes amends with him and Sahar, but his continued abuse of Jemmye leads her to volunteer, and seek help, at the Metropolitan Women's Shelter, where she comes to realize that she has not fully dealt with her tendency to gravitate toward the wrong men.
500	8	"Saint Patrick's Secrets"	August 18, 2010	1.987
The cast works at the mission on Saint Patrick's Day, during which Ryan talks with a 22-year-old homeless man, but Knight, Jemmye and McKenzie go drinking instead. McKenzie meets a man named Grant, with whom she becomes romantically affectionate back at the mansion. Jemmye, however, gets drunk, and acts irrationally depressed and angry back at the mansion, attempting at one point to walk out to return to Mississippi. After a sympathetic Knight talks to her, Jemmye realizes that she has not confronted the issue of her past abuse, and decides to see Dale, a social worker at the women's shelter, on a weekly basis. She also confides in her mother about her past abusive relationship for the first time.
501	9	"Fired"	August 25, 2010	2.166
As Ryan's erratic behavior disturbs the rest of the cast, he confides to Sahar that he suffers from obsessive compulsive disorder, which has been worsening. Suspicion falls on Knight after Ashlee discovers her Percocet is missing, fueling conflict between Jemmye and Ryan, and between Sahar and Knight. After Knight is apparently exonerated by a drug test, the cast begins to suspect Ryan. The under-confident Sahar is spurred by a visit from her best friend, Lila, and seeing Eric's standup comedy act to take the stage herself. Though she forgets the words to her song, Eric's support lifts her spirits.
502	10	"Getting Down, Blowing Up"	September 1, 2010	2.003
As tension between Ryan and the rest of the cast mounts, Eric tries to talk to him, but the cast's irritation with Ryan only worsens after his older brother and cousin come for a visit. Preston and Eric both attempt to pursue romantic opportunities, but Ryan's interference ruins Eric's attempts to court a woman he brings back home. After further actions by Ryan concerning the group car and a disruptive late arrival home one night, he and Eric have a heated argument. When Ryan shows with a beer up at a drug abuse class attended by the cast, their irritation with him, and his refusal to speak with them regarding this, results in his eviction from the house.
503	11	"Over Knight"	September 8, 2010	1.929
Knight and Jemmye's relationship continues to be marked by mutual abuse, reflection and reconciliation. On the cast's last day at the mission, Loretta asks them to live as homeless people for one night in order to educate them. Though Ashlee and Knight take the lesson less seriously than the others, Knight subsequently opens up to Loretta, and the cast shares an emotional parting with her. Sahar's boyfriend, Pablo (whose real name is Elie), visits New Orleans, but the male cast members are disturbed by his intimations about his sexual promiscuity, as is the entire cast by his excessive drinking, which threatens to ruin Sahar's performance with a local band called Flow Tribe.
504	12	"Au Revoir Nawlins"	September 15, 2010	1.708
As the cast's time in New Orleans nears its end, McKenzie and Grant continue to see each other, while Sahar deals with the aftermath of Pablo's visit. After Knight and Eric take up a local ice-cream eating challenge, the group completes the house they've been constructing for Habitat for Humanity. Ashlee and Preston debut on WWOZ with a show on the city's cuisine. Ryan returns for the group's MTV photo shoot, generating tension. As the cast enjoys their remaining time together, Knight and Jemmye ponder a future with each other, while McKenzie and Preston intend to continue their relationships with Grant and Marty, respectively. After sharing emotional exchanges, the castmates depart the house.

== After filming ==
The Real World: New Orleans Reunion premiered on September 22, 2010, and was watched by 1.69 million viewers. It was hosted by Maria Menounos, and featured the entire cast, as they discussed their time during filming and their lives since the show ended.

Since filming, Ashlee and Preston returned to Boston, where they continue to be friends, though Preston ended his relationship with Marty. McKenzie returned to Jupiter, Florida, to finish her final year at college studying social psychology, while remaining in a long distance relationship with Grant. Ryan returned to his father's salon in Arizona, and stated that despite having wanted to move out of Arizona, his time in New Orleans led to a change of heart. Eric became a full-time stand-up comic, and stated that he no longer works for the State Department. Sahar returned to Dearborn, Michigan, where she continues to work on music, and remains in a relationship with Pablo. Jemmye and Knight returned to New Orleans, where they were in the process of moving in together, as Knight did promotional work for his friends' clothing boutique.

Ryan's differences with his roommates were a central focus in discussing the cast's time during filming, including accusations of homophobia on his part, the bitter animosity between him and Preston, and the incident involving Ashlee's missing Percocet. Ryan indicated that he attended the Reunion because he was forced to, and was defiant in the face of questions by Menounos and the cast. Other issues discussed were Ryan's vacillation between kindness and abusiveness, Sahar's dismissal of the notion that she cheated on Pablo with Eric, McKenzie's behavior when drunk, Jemmye's past struggles with domestic violence and her relationship with Knight, and Ashlee's love of gossip and involvement in other people's personal affairs.

In 2017, Preston spoke about being homeless for two years after his stint on MTV.

Ashlee went onto a career as a radio personality in Boston. She works with Santi Deoleo on the Ramiro and the JAM'N 94.5 Morning Show on Jam'n 94.5. In 2020, Ashlee appeared on season 19 of Say Yes to the Dress before marrying Michael Joyce on March 13, 2021.

After competing on multiple seasons of The Challenge and appearing on the fourth season of Ex on the Beach, in 2020, Jemmye announced her departure from reality television.

On November 27, 2014, four years after the season aired, Ryan Knight was found dead at the age of 28, following a house party in Kenosha, Wisconsin. Several of Knight's friends indicated that he had been out partying Wednesday night (November 26) with a bunch of people and ended up at a friend's house. One friend discovered his dead body on Thanksgiving morning (Thursday, November 27), stating he had choked on his own vomit. Several people who were in contact with Knight while he was partying mentioned he had taken 'some pills,' but they were not specific, while saying Knight was upbeat Wednesday night. Knight stated he was dating someone new who made him extremely happy. No official cause of death was determined until March 2015, when autopsy results determined that Knight died of acute mixed drug and alcohol intoxication. Prior to his death, Knight participated in three seasons of The Challenge. His final challenge appearance, Battle of the Exes II, which aired in early 2015, was dedicated in his memory.

=== The Challenge ===
Cast member	Seasons of The Challenge	Other appearances
Ashlee Feldman	—N/a	—N/a
Eric Patrick	—N/a	—N/a
Jemmye Carroll	Battle of the Seasons (2012), Rivals II, Free Agents, Battle of the Exes II, XXX: Dirty 30, Vendettas, Final Reckoning	The Challenge: All Stars (season 1), The Challenge: All Stars (season 3)
McKenzie Coburn	Battle of the Seasons (2012)	—N/a
Preston Charles	Battle of the Seasons (2012), Rivals II, Free Agents	—N/a
Ryan Knight	Battle of the Seasons (2012), Rivals II, Battle of the Exes II	—N/a
Ryan Leslie	—N/a	—N/a
Sahar Dika	—N/a	—N/a
