= Fernando Cabrera =

Fernando Cabrera may refer to:

- Fernando Cabrera (baseball) (born 1981), Major League Baseball pitcher
- Fernando Cabrera (writer) (born 1964), poet and professor
- Fernando Cabrera (politician) (born 1964), Democratic New York City Council member
