= Joint Terrorism Task Force =

Multi-agency law enforcement partnerships in the United States

Agency overview
- Formed: May 28, 1980
- Jurisdiction: United States Federal (with state and local integration)
- Headquarters: Washington, D.C. (National JTTF at FBI Headquarters)
- Agency executive: Christopher A. Wray, Director, Federal Bureau of Investigation
- Parent agency: Federal Bureau of Investigation

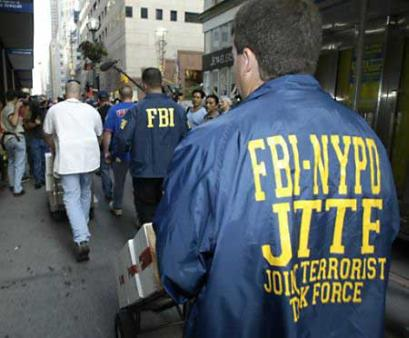
Members of the FBI–NYPD JTTF carrying evidence as part of an investigation in the early 2000s

A Joint Terrorism Task Force (JTTF) is an American locally-based multi-agency partnership between various federal, state, and local law enforcement agencies tasked with investigating terrorism and terrorism-related crimes, led by the Federal Bureau of Investigation and U.S. Department of Justice. The first JTTFs were established in the 1980s and 1990s, with their numbers increasing dramatically after the September 11 attacks.

== History and organization ==
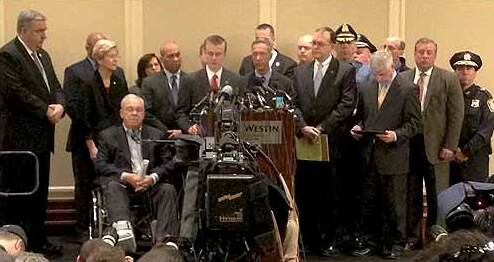
Boston, Massachusetts, JTTF members addressing news media during the investigation into the 2013 Boston Marathon bombing

The first JTTF was established in 1980 in New York City, with ten FBI special agents and ten New York City Police Department (NYPD) detectives. In 1999, the United States had 26 JTTFs; shortly after the attacks, FBI director Robert Mueller instructed all FBI field offices to establish formal terrorism task forces. By December 2011, there were more than 100 Joint Terrorism Task Forces nationwide, the vast majority established after the September 11 attacks. There were 113 JTTFs as of 2013, and approximately 200 JTTFs as of 2022.

JTTFs are led by the Federal Bureau of Investigation, which is part of the U.S. Department of Justice. The various investigators, analysts, and specialists who participate in JTTFs (including linguists and SWAT personnel) are drawn from more than 600 state and local agencies and 50 federal agencies (including both federal law enforcement and intelligence agencies). The FBI's 2011 Domestic Investigations and Operations Guide, cited in a 2013 Congressional Research Service report, stated that more than 4,400 federal, state, and local law enforcement officers and agents work in JTTFs.

The regional JTTFs coordinate their efforts through the interagency National Joint Terrorism Task Force (NJTTF), based at FBI Headquarters in Washington, D.C. As of 2003, NJTTF was composed of representatives from 35 federal agencies and fell under the Operational Support Branch of the FBI Counterterrorism Division.

A 2013 report from the Brennan Center for Justice at the NYU School of Law noted that "JTTFs tend to focus on investigative work while fusion centers are geared towards information collection and analysis, but their missions are intimately related and often overlapping"; JTTFs and fusion centers are sometimes "co-located" in the same physical working space.

== Investigations ==
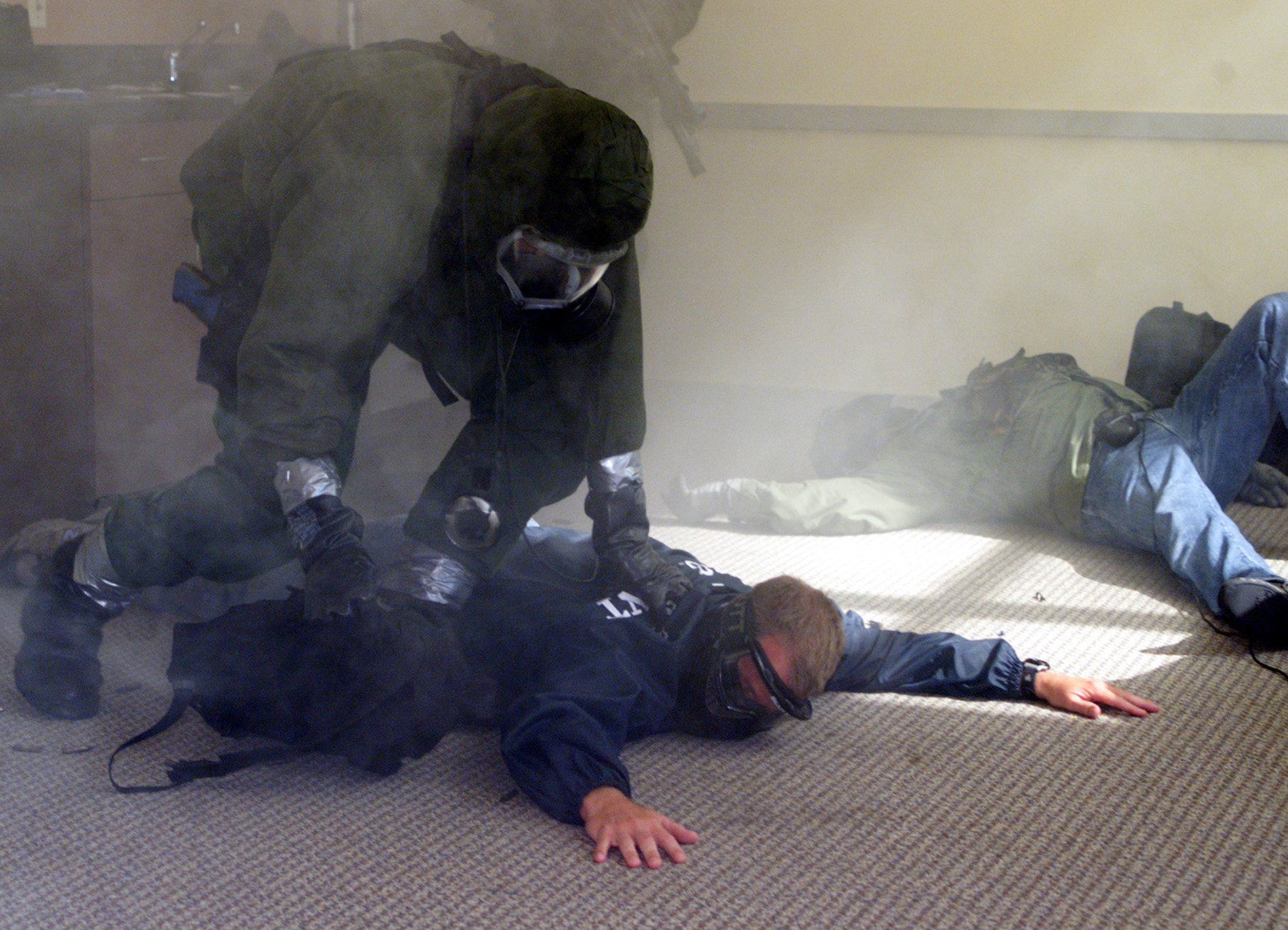
A United States Park Police SWAT officer arresting a terrorist during a hostage situation training exercise at Naval Support Facility Anacostia in 1999. An FBI JTTF was one of the agencies involved in the exercise.

Joint Terrorism Task Forces have participated in high-profile investigations, including investigations into the 2007 Fort Dix attack plot, 2007 John F. Kennedy International Airport attack plot, 2009 plot by Najibullah Zazi targeting the New York City subway, Tarek Mehanna case, 2012 Jose Pimentel case, 2015 Usaama Rahim plot, Ahmad Khan Rahami's 2016 New York and New Jersey bombings, Mark Steven Domingo's failed 2019 plot to bomb a rally in Long Beach, California, and January 6 United States Capitol attack.

=== Fort Hood shooting ===
Before U.S. Army psychiatrist Nidal Hasan murdered 14 people in a mass shooting at Fort Hood in Texas in 2009, the JTTF in San Diego had acquired two messages from Hasen to radical Islamic ideologue Anwar al-Aulaqi. Concerned by the content of the messages, the San Diego JTTF contacted FBI Headquarters and the JTTF based in the FBI's Washington Field Office. The Washington Field Office did a limited assessment and concluded that Hasan was not "involved in terrorist activities." In the meantime, agents in San Diego acquired 14 additional emails and messages (12 from Hasan to al-Aulaqi and two from al-Aulaqi to Hasen), but San Diego did not forward these communications to the D.C. JTTF, and neither JTTF took any action. Hasan committed the terrorist attack at Fort Hood several months later.

A commission led by William H. Webster investigated the FBI's counterterrorism intelligence in the lead-up to the Fort Hood shooting, and released its final report in 2012. The Webster Commission found that the assessment of Hasan conducted by the FBI and JTTFs was "belated, incomplete, and rushed, primarily because of their workload" and an "exponential growth in the amount of electronically stored information." The report did, however, conclude that all the FBI and task force personnel "acted with good intent" and that their mistakes did not result "from intentional misconduct."

== Local participation and withdrawals ==
In 2005, Portland, Oregon, became the first city in the nation to withdraw from a JTTF after the City Council voted 4–1 to leave. The city rejoined the task force in 2015, with the City Council voting 3–2 to approve the assignment of two of its city's police officers to join the JTTF staff. In 2019, Portland again voted to leave the JTTF by a 3–2 vote.

After joining in 2002, San Francisco, California withdrew its police officers from the JTTF in 2017. It was later revealed in 2019 from an FBI white paper that San Francisco police officers and the FBI were not truthful about the JTTF's violations of local law and policy, and that the police involved with JTTF thought civil rights and free speech in San Francisco were a problem.

== Criticism ==
After the September 2001 terrorist attacks, the FBI began to establish or intensify working relationships with campus police departments; by January 2003, JTTFs included campus police officers from at least a dozen universities. This prompted some criticism from faculty and student organizations.

Documents obtained by various American Civil Liberties Union (ACLU) affiliates in 2004, 2005, and 2006 in response to Freedom of Information Act requests showed that JTTF investigations have focused on "peaceful advocacy organizations such as the School of the Americas Watch, Greenpeace, Catholic Workers Group, the Rocky Mountain Peace and Justice Center in Colorado, and the Thomas Merton Center for Peace and Justice in Pennsylvania, among others." The ACLU has criticized these investigations, calling them "inappropriate" targeting of "peaceful political activity having nothing to do with terrorism."

After a detective with the Fresno County, California, Sheriff's Department who was a member of the JTTF attended public meetings of Peace Fresno in 2003, the Sheriff's Department issued a statement saying that "For the purpose of detecting or preventing terrorist activities, the Fresno County Sheriff’s Department may visit any place and attend any event that is open to the public, on the same terms and conditions as members of the public generally."

In June 2008, according to City Pages, the Minneapolis-based JTTF approached a source to infiltrate vegan potlucks and eventually report back to authorities on organized protesting activities in preparation for the 2008 Republican National Convention in nearby Saint Paul.

In 2010, the Justice Department Office of Inspector General (OIG) issued a report that criticized the FBI for investigating various domestic activist groups from 2001 to 2006, including PETA, the Thomas Merton Center, and the Catholic Worker. The OIG faulted the FBI for providing the OIG "with speculative, after-the-fact rationalizations for their prior decisions to open investigations that [OIG] did not find persuasive."

A 2013 report from the Brennan Center for Justice at the NYU School of Law argued that, "The most significant oversight problem with assigning police officers to JTTFs is that there is no mechanism geared towards ensuring compliance with state and local laws. This problem is exacerbated by the fact that rules relating to how police officers should act in the event of a conflict between their federal and state/local obligations are sometimes unknown and almost always unclear."

In 2025, the JTTFs were criticized for being weaponized by the second Trump administration to target his political opponents after President Donald Trump ordered them to target groups promoting "anti-Americanism, anti-capitalism, and anti-Christianity" and declaring a variety of liberal groups and nonprofits as "domestic terrorists" or promoting violence.

== See also ==
- Terrorist Screening Database
- Terrorist Screening Center
- Integrated National Security Enforcement Teams (Canada)
- National Counter Terrorism Policing Network (United Kingdom)
