= Patricia Dowling =

Patricia Dowling may refer to:

- Patricia Dowling (Massachusetts politician) (born 1957)
- Patricia Dowling (New Hampshire politician) (born 1942)
