= List of mayors of Lawrence, Massachusetts =

Mayor of Lawrence
- Flag of Lawrence
- Incumbent; Brian De Peña since November 12, 2021
- Style: His/Her Honor
- Type: Chief executive
- Member of: School Committee
- Residence: None official
- Seat: Lawrence City Hall
- Nominator: Non-partisan nominating petition
- Appointer: Popular vote
- Term length: Four years
- Constituting instrument: Lawrence City Charter
- Precursor: Lawrence Board of Selectmen (1847-1853)
- Formation: 1853
- First holder: Charles Storer Storrow
- Website: www.cityoflawrence.com/27/Office-of-The-Mayor

The mayor of Lawrence is the head of the municipal government in Lawrence, Massachusetts. There was no mayor of Lawrence from April 14, 1847 until March 21, 1853, because up to that point Lawrence was still incorporated as a town. The town of Lawrence was administered by the board of selectmen.

== List of mayors ==
#	Mayor	Picture	Term	Party	Notes
1st	Charles Storer Storrow		1853–1854	Whig	First mayor under the original city charter.
2nd	Enoch Bartlett		1854–1855	Democratic	
3rd	Albert Warren		1855–1857	Native American Party	
4th	John R. Rollins		1857–1859	Whig	
5th	Henry K. Oliver		1859–1860	Republican	
6th	Daniel Saunders, Jr.		1860–1861	Democratic	Saunders was the founder of Lawrence.
7th	James K. Barker		1861–1862	Republican	
8th	William H. P. Wright		1862–1864	Republican	
9th	Alfred J. French		1864–1865	Republican	
10th	Milton Bonney		1865–January 1, 1866	Republican	
11th	Pardon Armington		January 1, 1866–1867	Republican	
12th	Nathaniel P. H. Melvin		1867–1869	Democratic	
13th	Frank Davis		1869–January 3, 1870	Republican	
14th	Nathaniel P. H. Melvin		January 3, 1870–1871	Democratic	
15th	S. B. W. Davis		1871–1872	Republican	
16th	John K. Tarbox		1873–January 4, 1875	Democratic	
17th	Robert H. Tewksbury		January 4, 1875–January 3, 1876	Republican	
18th	Edmund R. Hayden		January 3, 1876–1876	Democratic	
19th	Caleb Saunders		January 1, 1877–1877	Democratic	
20th	James R. Simpson		1878–1880	Republican	
21st	Henry Kingman Webster		1881–1881	Republican	
22nd	John Breen		1882–1884	Democratic	First Irish born or Roman Catholic Mayor in New England.
23rd	James R. Simpson		1885–1885	Republican	
24th	Alexander B. Bruce		1886–1887	Democratic	
25th	Alvin E. Mack		1888–1889	Republican	
26th	John W. Crawford		1890–1890	Democratic	
27th	Lewis P. Collins		1891–1891	Republican	
28th	Henry P. Doe		1892–1892	Democratic	
29th	Alvin E. Mack		1893–1893	Republican	
30th	Charles G. Rutter		1894–1895	Democratic	
31st	George S. Junkins		1896–1897	Republican	
32nd	James H. Eaton		1898–1899	Republican	
33rd	James F. Leonard		1900–1902	Democratic	
34th	Alexander F. Grany		1903–January 4, 1904		
35th	Cornelius F. Lynch		January 4, 1904–1905		
36th	John P. Kane		1906–1908		
37th	William P. White		1909–July 25, 1910		Resigned after he was convicted on bribery charges and sentenced to three years in the house of correction. White's resignation was effective when accepted by both branches of the city council on July 25, 1910.
Acting	Thomas M. Jordan		July 25, 1910–August 29, 1910		Served as acting mayor in his role as chairman of the board of aldermen.
38th	John T. Cahill		August 29, 1910–January 1, 1912	Democratic	Elected by a joint session of the city council to fill the vacancy caused by White's resignation.
39th	Michael A. Scanlon		January 1, 1912–August 16, 1914		A new city charter went into effect on January 1, 1912, creating a commission form of government and giving the mayor a two-year term beginning with Scanlon. On January 15, 1912, Scanlon requested the state militia to suppress the 'Bread and Roses strike', resulting in the death of a striker. On February 24, 1912, Scanlon ordered police to prevent striking workers' children from traveling to Washington, D.C., for a protest march. The mothers and children were beaten as they gathered at the train station. Scanlon died in office.
40th	John P. Kane		1914–1915		To fill vacancy
41st	John J. Hurley		1916–1919		
42nd	William P. White		1920–1921		
43rd	Daniel W. Mahoney		1922–1923		
44th	Walter T. Rochefort		1924–1928		
45th	Michael A. Landers		1928–1931		
46th	William P. White		1932–1933		
47th	Walter A. Griffin		1934–1942		
48th	James P. Meehan		1942–1951	Democratic	
49th	John J. Buckley		1952–1965	Democratic	
50th	Daniel P. Kiley, Jr.		1966–1971		
51st	John J. Buckley		1972–1977	Democratic	
52nd	Lawrence P. LeFebre		1978–1983	Democratic	
53rd	John J. Buckley		1984-January 2, 1986	Democratic	
54th	Kevin J. Sullivan		January 2, 1986–1991	Democratic	Switched from Democrat to Republican
54th	Kevin J. Sullivan		1991–1993	Republican	Resigned to accept an appointment as head of State Transportation
Acting	George Miller		1993		
Acting	Leonard J. Degnan		1993	Democratic	
55th	Mary Claire Kennedy		1993–1998	Republican	
56th	Patricia Dowling		1998–2001	Democratic	Resigned to accept an appointment as a state district court judge.
Acting	Marcos Devers		September 2001 – November, 2001	Democratic	First Hispanic mayor of Lawrence.
57th	Michael J. Sullivan		November 2001 - January 4, 2010	Republican	
58th	William Lantigua		January 4, 2010 – January 4, 2014	Democratic	
59th	Dan Rivera		January 4, 2014 - January 9, 2021	Democratic	
Acting	Kendrys Vasquez		January 9, 2021 – November 12, 2021	Democratic	
60th	Brian De Peña		November 12, 2021 -	Democratic	
