= Celina Reyes =

American politician

Member-elect of the Massachusetts House of Representatives from the 16th Essex district
- Assuming office January 2027
- Succeeding: Francisco E. Paulino

Personal details
- Party: Democratic

Celina Reyes is an American politician. A member of the Democratic Party, she is the member-elect for the 16th Essex district of the Massachusetts House of Representatives.
