= Jose L. Santiago =

American politician

Member of the Massachusetts House of Representatives from the 16th Essex District
- In office 1999–2003
- Succeeded by: William Lantigua

Personal details
- Party: Democratic
- Occupation: Politician

Jose L. Santiago is an American politician who served in the Massachusetts House of Representatives for the 16th Essex District from 1999 to 2003.

In 2002, he was defeated for reelection by Independent candidate and mayor of Lawrence, William Lantigua. He attempted to seek re-nomination for his old seat in 2004 but lost.

In 2012, he ran as an independent for the 6th Essex District, but lost to incumbent Marcos Devers.
