= Michael J. Sullivan (mayor) =

American politician (born 1956)

Mayor of Lawrence, Massachusetts
- In office November 8, 2001 – January 4, 2010
- Preceded by: Marcos A. Devers (acting)
- Succeeded by: William Lantigua

Member of the Lawrence, Massachusetts City Council

Personal details
- Born: December 18, 1956 (age 69)
- Party: Republican
- Spouse: Mary Sullivan (divorced)

Michael J. Sullivan (born December 18, 1956) was the mayor of the City of Lawrence, Massachusetts. A Republican, Sullivan became the mayor in 2001 after beating Isabel Melendez. He was re-elected in 2005 beating Marcos Devers in non-partisan elections.

Although he formed an exploratory committee to enter the Special Election to replace Congressman Marty Meehan, Sullivan ultimately decided not to run and endorsed Republican candidate Jim Ogonowski.

He is the brother of former Lawrence Mayor and State Cabinet Secretary Kevin J. Sullivan.

Political offices
Preceded by Marcos A. Devers (acting)	Mayor of Lawrence; January 2002 - January 4, 2010	Succeeded by William Lantigua
