= Henry P. Doe =

American politician

Henry Plummer Doe

27th Mayor of Lawrence, Massachusetts
- In office 1892–1892
- Preceded by: Lewis P. Collins
- Succeeded by: Alvin E. Mack

Member of the Lawrence, Massachusetts Board of Aldermen Ward 4

Member of the Lawrence, Massachusetts Common Council Ward 3

Personal details
- Born: October 4, 1841 Methuen, Massachusetts
- Died: May 4, 1904 Lawrence, Massachusetts
- Resting place: Bellevue Cemetery
- Party: Democratic
- Spouse: Wilhelmina May Russell
- Children: Beatrice (Doe) Allen
- Parent(s): Jeremiah and Elizabeth (Pecker) Doe
- Relatives: Stephen G. Allen Jr (Son-in-law); Will Allen (2x Great Grandson of Stephen)
- Profession: Jeweler

Henry Plummer Doe (October 4, 1841 – May 4, 1904) was an American jeweler and politician who served as the twenty-seventh Mayor of Lawrence, Massachusetts.

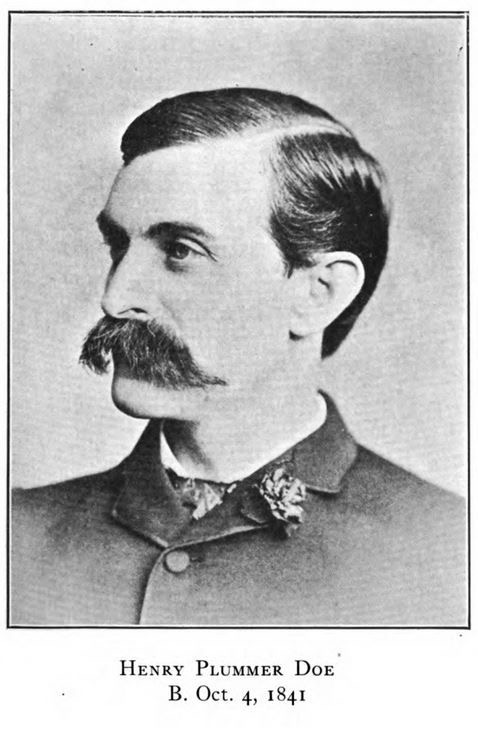
Portrait of Henry P. Doe

Henry Plummer Doe was born on 4 October 1841 in Methuen, Massachusetts to Jeremiah and Elizabeth (Pecker) Doe. He was the third of five children.

He apprenticed under George Washington Hazen in Boston, Massachusetts, beginning in 1861, and continued as a journeyman until 1867. He was recorded in the 1870 and 1880 U.S. censuses in Lawrence, Massachusetts, listed as a watchmaker.

He married Wilhelmina May Russell, daughter of Moody and Frances (Wardwell) Russell, on 14 November 1869 in Andover, Massachusetts. Together, they had one daughter, Beatrice Russell (Doe) Allen.

== Bibliography ==
- Massachusetts of Today: A Memorial of the State, Historical and Biographical, Issued for the World's Columbian Exposition at Chicago, page 461, (1892)

== Footnotes ==
Political offices
Preceded by Lewis P. Collins	27th Mayor of Lawrence, Massachusetts; 1892–1892	Succeeded by Alvin E. Mack
