= John J. Buckley (mayor) =

American politician

John Joseph Buckley

Mayor of Lawrence, Massachusetts
- In office January 1984 – January 2, 1986
- Preceded by: Lawrence P. LeFebre
- Succeeded by: Kevin J. Sullivan
- In office 1972–1978
- Preceded by: Daniel P. Kiley, Jr.
- Succeeded by: Lawrence P. LeFebre
- In office 1951–1965
- Preceded by: James P. Meehan
- Succeeded by: Daniel P. Kiley, Jr.

Massachusetts Governor's Council 5th Council District
- In office 1961–1965
- Preceded by: Augustus Gardner Means
- Succeeded by: Thomas J. Lane

Personal details
- Born: July 5, 1916 Lawrence, Massachusetts
- Died: February 3, 1997 (aged 80)
- Resting place: Immaculate Conception Cemetery in Lawrence, Massachusetts
- Party: Democratic
- Children: John J. Buckley, Jr.; Michael V. Buckley; Brian F. Buckley; and Patrick M. Buckley.
- Education: Georgetown

Military service
- Branch/service: United States Army
- Rank: Major
- Battles/wars: World War II

John Joseph Buckley (July 5, 1916 – February 3, 1997) was an American politician who served on the Massachusetts Governor's Council and as the Mayor of Lawrence, Massachusetts. He was an unsuccessful candidate for Treasurer and Receiver-General of Massachusetts in 1964.

Political offices
Preceded by	Member of the Massachusetts Governor's Council; 5th Council District; 1961–1964	Succeeded by
Preceded by	Mayor of Lawrence, Massachusetts; 1972–1978	Succeeded by Lawrence P. LeFebre
Preceded by Lawrence P. LeFebre	Mayor of Lawrence, Massachusetts; January 1984 – January 1986	Succeeded by Kevin J Sullivan
