= William Lantigua =

American politician (born 1955)

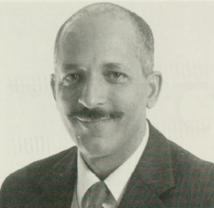
- Portrait of William Lantigua

Mayor of Lawrence, Massachusetts
- In office January 4, 2010 – January 4, 2014
- Preceded by: Michael J. Sullivan
- Succeeded by: Dan Rivera

Member of the Massachusetts House of Representatives 16th Essex District
- In office January 2003 – February 12, 2010
- Preceded by: Jose L. Santiago
- Succeeded by: Marcos Devers

Personal details
- Born: February 19, 1955 (age 71) Dominican Republic
- Party: Independent, Democratic

William Lantigua (born February 19, 1955) is a politician in Massachusetts. He became Mayor of Lawrence, Massachusetts, in January 2010 following his November 2009 defeat of Lawrence City Councilor David Abdoo. Upon taking office, Lantigua became the first elected and second serving Hispanic mayor in Massachusetts history.

== Early life and career ==
Lantigua was born in the Dominican Republic on February 19, 1955, to Enrique Lantigua and Ana Elvira Soto. Lantigua has three siblings, one sister and two brothers. He moved to the United States in 1974 from the Dominican Republic. He was educated in the Dominican Republic and later worked for 23 years for Schneider Electric in North Andover, Massachusetts. William Lantigua is the father of three daughters; Veronica, Vanessa, and Valerie as well as his son William Kennedy.

For years during the 1990s, Lantigua worked as an organizer in the City of Lawrence helping elect Jose Santiago, the second Puerto Rican to serve in the Massachusetts House of Representatives (the first was Nelson Merced, elected in 1988) and later Mary-Ellen Manning to Massachusetts Governor's Council over incumbent and Mayor of Lawrence, Patricia Dowling.

== Massachusetts House of Representatives ==
In 2002, Lantigua ran as an independent against Democrat Jose Santiago and was elected a member of the Massachusetts House of Representatives. In 2004, Santiago again ran against Lantigua, eventually losing for a second time.

In 2006, Lantigua decided to run for the first time as a Democrat; this time being challenged by longtime city councilor and former Mayor of Lawrence Marcos Devers. However, Lantigua was able to have Devers removed from the ballot by challenging his residency in the district, since Devers lived in the district under one year. Lantigua went on to win the election unopposed.

In 2008, Devers again challenged Lantigua in the Democratic primary, this time with his name on the ballot, only to lose by 399 votes. Lantigua was unchallenged in the general election, winning his 4th election to the Massachusetts House of Representatives. He was State Representative of the 16th Essex district from 2003 until his resignation February 2010.

As a State Representative, he served as Vice-Chairman of the Elder Affairs Committee and as a member of the Ways and Means Committee along with the Committee on Bonding and Capital Expenses. He also served two one-year terms as chair of the Massachusetts Black Legislative Caucus.

== Mayor of Lawrence ==
Upon taking office, Lantigua became the first elected Latino mayor in Massachusetts history and only the third Dominican-American Mayor in the United States, after Mayor Alex Blanco of Passaic, New Jersey, elected 2008 and fellow Lawrence Mayor Marcos Devers appointed in 2001. Lantigua caused controversy when fellow lawmakers on Beacon Hill questioned his ability to hold the position of mayor and State Representative simultaneously in the midst of a citywide financial crisis.

In April 2011 Lantigua was the subject of a federal investigation into possible corruption and other potential wrongdoing. This investigation was the latest in a series of bizarre events that have led to a recall petition to oust Lantigua from office after 15 tumultuous months.

On May 11, 2011, Lantigua was criticized for receiving fuel assistance totaling possibly $1,165, despite a combined household income of $145,000. Lantigua later returned the money.

In the summer of 2012, Mayor Lantigua married the principal witness against him, his longtime girlfriend and City Hall worker Lorenza Ortega. Ortega gave evidence to the grand jury in May 2012, when she and Lantigua had been rumored to be split up, but now, if they are indeed married, Ortega might claim spousal privilege (the right of a spouse to avoid giving incriminating evidence or testimony against the other spouse when the other spouse is on trial), which, if the trial proceeds, could possibly make it harder to secure a conviction.

== Personal life ==
Lantigua’s ex-wife is Magalis “Maggie” Lantigua Fawcett. His current wife is Mayra Lantigua and his daughter is Vanessa.

Political offices
Preceded by Michael J. Sullivan	Mayor of Lawrence; January 2010 – January 2014	Succeeded by Daniel Rivera
Preceded by Jose L. Santiago	Member of the Massachusetts House of Representatives; 16th Essex District; January 2003 – February 12, 2010	Succeeded by Marcos Devers
