= John W. Crawford =

American physician

John William Crawford

25th Mayor of Lawrence, Massachusetts
- In office 1890–1890
- Preceded by: Alvin E. Mack
- Succeeded by: Lewis P. Collins

Personal details
- Born: May 15, 1846 Glasgow, Scotland
- Education: Harvard Medical School, M.S. 1867.

John William Crawford (born May 15, 1846) was an American medical doctor and politician who served as the 25th Mayor of Lawrence, Massachusetts.

== Early life ==
Crawford was born Glasgow, Scotland on May 15, 1846.

== Medical School education ==
Crawford graduated from Harvard Medical School in 1867.

== Mayor of Lawrence, Massachusetts ==
Crawford was the Mayor of Lawrence, Massachusetts in 1890.

== Bibliography ==
- "The Standard Medical Directory of North America, 1902: Including a Directory of Practicing Physicians in The United States of America, Canada, Cuba, Mexico and Central America," pg. 234. (1902).
- Harrington, Thomas Francis: "The Harvard Medical School: A History, Narrative and Documentary 1782 – 1905, Volume III," pg. 1525, (1905).

Political offices
Preceded by Alvin E. Mack	25th Mayor of Lawrence, Massachusetts; 1890-1890	Succeeded by Lewis P. Collins
