= Francisco E. Paulino =

American politician

Francisco Paulino
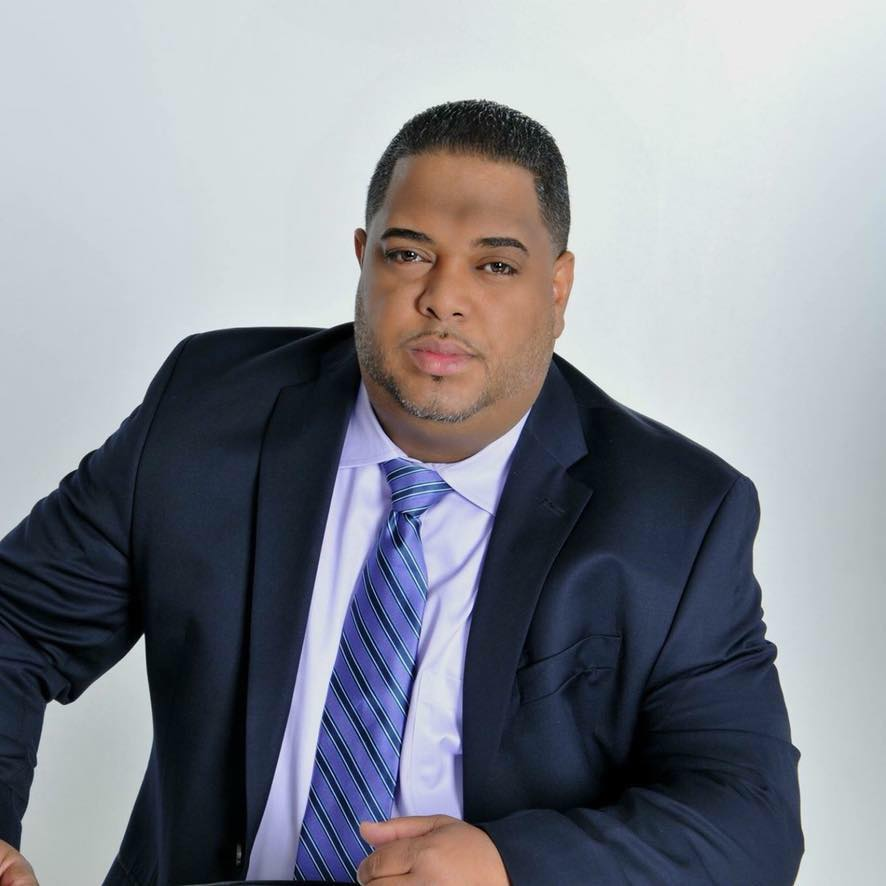

Member of the Massachusetts House of Representatives from the 16th Essex district
- Incumbent
- Assumed office January 4, 2023
- Preceded by: Marcos Devers
- Succeeded by: Celina Reyes (elect)

Personal details
- Born: February 14, 1980 (age 46) Santiago de los Caballeros, Dominican Republic
- Party: Democratic
- Education: Mount Washington College (BS); Suffolk University (JD, LLM)

Francisco E. Paulino is an American politician. He is a member of the Massachusetts House of Representatives. He has represented the 16th Essex district since 2023.

== Education and early career ==
Paulino graduated from Mount Washington College with a bachelor's degree in criminal justice in 2012. He later earned Juris Doctor and master of law in taxation degrees from Suffolk University Law School.

Paulino founded Madison Tax LLC in 2013 and Madison Mortgage Inc. in 2019. He is also a mortgage consultant for Insight Mortgage.

== Political career ==
Paulino defeated incumbent Marcos Devers in the 2022 primary election to become the Democratic nominee for the 16th Essex seat. He ran unopposed in the 2022 Massachusetts House of Representatives election.

In a rematch, Paulino secured the Democratic nomination for the 16th Essex District seat in the Massachusetts House of Representatives on Tuesday, September 3, 2024, defeating Marcos Devers of Lawrence with 58.8% of the votes.

Paulino serves on the Joint Committee on Revenue, Joint Committee on Public Safety and Homeland Security, Joint Committee on Emergency Preparedness and Management, and the House Committee on Federal Stimulus and Census Oversight.

== Fraud charges ==
On August 26, 2026, Paulino was arrested on charges that he had stolen more than $700,000 in federal funds intended for COVID-19 pandemic relief, which Paulino allegedly primarily spent on his own campaign and real estate.

== See also ==
- 2023–2024 Massachusetts legislature
