= Kevin J. Sullivan (mayor) =

American politician (born 1959)

Secretary of Administration and Finance of Massachusetts
- In office 2002–2003
- Preceded by: Stephen Crosby
- Succeeded by: Eric Kriss

Massachusetts Secretary of Transportation
- In office 1999–2002
- Preceded by: Patrick J. Moynihan
- Succeeded by: James H. Scanlan

Mayor of Lawrence, Massachusetts
- In office 1986–1993
- Preceded by: John J. Buckley
- Succeeded by: Leonard J. Degnan (Acting)

Personal details
- Born: 1959 (age 66–67) Lawrence, Massachusetts
- Party: Democrat (1985–1991); Republican (1991–present)
- Education: University of Lowell
- Occupation: Banker

Kevin J. Sullivan (born 1959) is an American politician who served as Mayor of Lawrence, Massachusetts from 1986 to 1993, Massachusetts Secretary of Transportation from 1999 to 2002, and Massachusetts Secretary of Administration and Finance from 2002 to 2003.

Since 2003, Sullivan has worked for Santander Bank. He is currently Santander's Director of Government Banking. From 2009 to 2011, he was a member of the state Inspector General's Council.

== Family ==
He is the brother of former Lawrence Mayor Michael J. Sullivan.
