= 2007 Massachusetts's 5th congressional district special election =

- October 16, 2007

Massachusetts's 5th congressional district
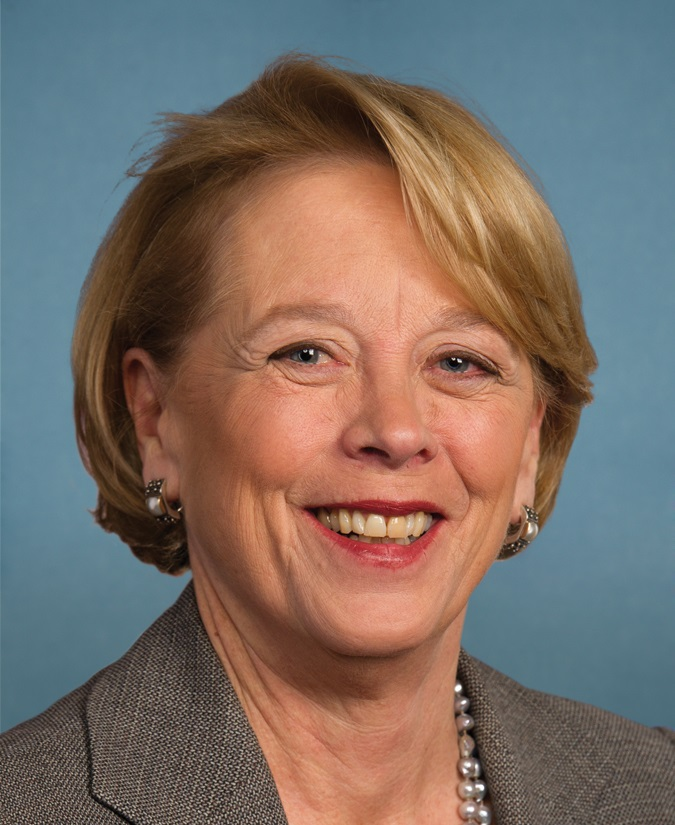

Nominee	Niki Tsongas	Jim Ogonowski
Party	Democratic	Republican
Popular vote	54,363	47,770
Percentage	51.3%	45.1%
- Municipality results Tsongas: 40–50% 50–60% 60–70% Ogonowski: 40–50% 50–60% 60–70%
U.S. Representative before election
Marty Meehan
Democratic
Elected U.S. Representative
Niki Tsongas
Democratic

Massachusetts held a special election to fill a vacancy in Massachusetts's 5th congressional district on October 16, 2007. Democrat Niki Tsongas won election to Congress, defeating Republican Jim Ogonowski in an election that was closer than expected.

Marty Meehan had been the district's Representative to Congress since 1993. He announced his resignation in May 2007 (effective July 1), allowing him to become the next Chancellor of the University of Massachusetts Lowell. Meehan had last won re-election in 2006, when he ran unopposed. The district was considered to be strongly Democratic, as it voted 58% for the Democratic candidate (John Kerry) in the most recent presidential election. In addition, Massachusetts had not elected a Republican to Congress since Peter Blute and Peter Torkildsen were last elected to office in 1994 (both were defeated in 1996). No Republican had held the 5th congressional district's seat since Paul W. Cronin departed from office in 1975 after his defeat by Democrat Paul Tsongas in 1974.

A primary election was held on September 4, 2007, to determine each political party's nominee for the general election. Niki Tsongas won the Democratic nomination and Jim Ogonowski won the Republican nomination. Tsongas won the general election, held on October 16, 2007, with 51% of the vote; Ogonowski received 45%.

== Candidates ==
All candidates for the election are listed alphabetically first by party, then by name. Bold is primary winners and general election candidates.

=== Constitution ===
- Kevin Thompson – State Constitution Party Secretary from Brockton

=== Democratic ===
- Eileen Donoghue – City Councilor and former Lowell Mayor
- Jamie Eldridge – State Representative from Acton
- Barry Finegold – State Representative from Andover
- Jim Miceli – State Representative from Wilmington
- Niki Tsongas – Dean at Middlesex Community College from Lowell, and widow of Paul Tsongas

=== Independent ===
- Kurt Hayes – Businessman from Boxborough
- Patrick O. Murphy – Brick and stonemason from Lowell

=== Republican ===
- Jim Ogonowski – Former Air Force Lt. Colonel from Dracut, brother of John Ogonowski, the Captain of American Airlines Flight 11, which was hijacked by al-Qaeda terrorists and flown into the North Tower of the World Trade Center as part of the September 11 attacks. He is believed to have been killed by the hijackers prior to the crash.
- Thomas Tierney – Self-Employed Independent Consulting Actuary from Framingham

== Withdrawn or not running ==
=== Democratic ===
- James DiPaola – Middlesex County Sheriff
- David O'Brien – Democratic National Committee member from Concord

=== Republican ===
- Fred Smerlas – Former NFL defensive lineman
- Michael J. Sullivan – Mayor of Lawrence

== Polling ==
=== Democratic primary ===
Source	Date	Donoghue (D)	Eldridge (D)	Finegold (D)	Miceli (D)	Tsongas (D)		
Survey USA	Aug 27–29, 2007	29%	15%	9%	3%	40%		
Survey USA	Aug 11–13, 2007	16%	13%	14%	4%	38%		
Kiley & Company	Aug 8–9, 2007	18%	16%	13%	4%	34%		
JEF Associates	Aug 6–7, 2007	22%	7%	8%	4%	28%		
Kiley & Company	July 15, 2007	13%	12%	10%	4%	36%		
JEF Associates	Jun 28–30, 2007	17%	10%	13%	4%	26%		
Kiley & Company	May 22, 2007	9%	10%	11%	3%	38%		
Garin-Hart-Yang Research	May 3–4, 2007	13%	5%	10%	4%	36%	DiPaola (D)	O'Brien (D)
Kiley & Company	Mar 23–24, 2007	9%	9%	8%	3%	35%	6%	3%

=== Republican primary ===
Source	Date	Ogonowski (R)	Tierney (R)
Survey USA	Aug 27–29, 2007	72%	12%

=== General Election ===
Source	Date	Ogonowski (R)	Tsongas (D)	Thompson (C)	Hayes (I)	Murphy (I)
Survey USA	Oct 8–10, 2007	42%	51%	0%	2%	4%
RCCC Poll	Oct 1–5, 2007	39%	44%	N/A	N/A	N/A
Survey USA	Sep 7–9, 2007	41%	51%	2%	2%	1%

== Results ==
Bold indicates winner of nomination. Source: https://web.archive.org/web/20120207164837/http://www.thebostonchannel.com/politics/14003157/detail.html

=== General Election ===
Massachusetts's 5th congressional district special election, 2007
Party	Candidate	Votes	%	±%
**Democratic**	**Niki Tsongas**	**54,363**	**51.32**	**−48.68**
Republican	Jim Ogonowski	47,770	45.10	+45.10
Independent	Patrick O. Murphy	2,170	2.05	+2.05
Independent	Kurt Hayes	1,125	1.06	+1.06
Constitution	Kevin Thompson	494	0.47	0.47
Majority		6,593	6%	
Turnout		105,922		
Democratic **hold**		Swing	46.89% D to R	

=== Democratic primary ===
Candidates		Democratic Primary Election, Sep 4	
Candidate	Party	Votes	Percent
**Niki Tsongas**	**Democratic**	19,811	35.69%
Eileen Donoghue	Democratic	17,373	31.29%
Jamie Eldridge	Democratic	8,041	14.48%
Barry Finegold	Democratic	6,996	12.60%
Jim Miceli	Democratic	3,296	5.94%

=== Republican primary ===
Candidates		Republican Primary Election, Sep 4	
Candidate	Party	Votes	Percent
**Jim Ogonowski**	**Republican**	12,014	89.04%
Tom Tierney	Republican	1,479	10.96%

== See also ==
- List of special elections to the United States House of Representatives
