= Christina Mendez =

American model (born 1981)

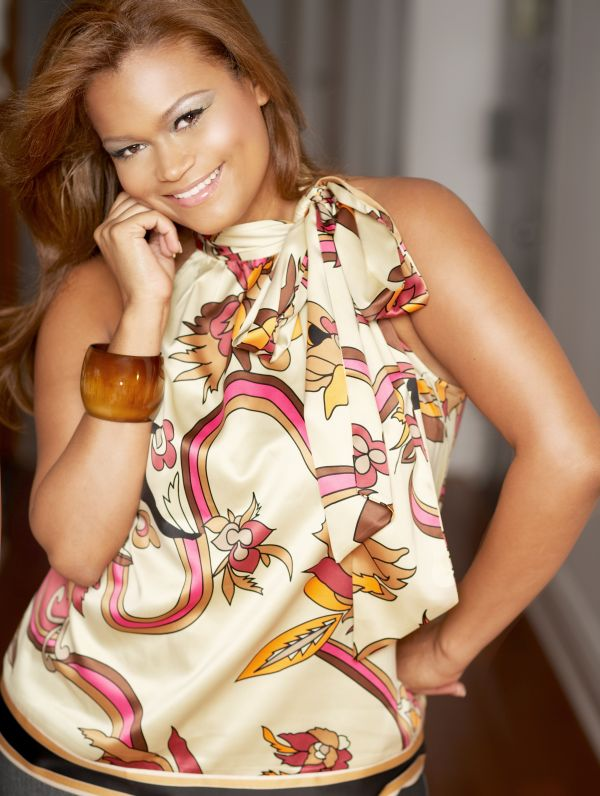
- Born: March 13, 1981 (age 45); Upper West Side, Manhattan, New York City, New York, United States
- Spouse: Single
- Children: 2, Cailey Allen, Damian Reid
- Modeling information
- Height: 5 ft 9 in (1.75 m)
- Hair color: Auburn
- Eye color: Brown
- Website: Official website

Christina Mendez (born March 13, 1981) is a New York City-based plus-size model and entertainment personality.

== Early and personal life ==
The daughter of immigrants from the Dominican Republic, Mendez was raised in the Upper West Side part of Manhattan, New York City. She is an alumna of Manhattan's Bayard Rustin High School for the Humanities and Morris Brown College in Atlanta.

As the granddaughter of merengue artist Joseíto Mateo, Mendez had exposure to the entertainment business from an early age.

When her career was starting to launch, Mendez soon discovered she was pregnant. Her son Damian was diagnosed with autism at age two. Dedicating herself to her son's development and welfare, she placed her aspirations on hold for several years, but in 2006 she resumed her career. In 2011, she gave birth to a daughter, Cailey.

== Modeling career ==
Mendez has appeared in Glamour, Latina, Cosmopolitan, People en Español, Essence, Shape, The Source and many others. She is one of the first full-size Latina models to serve as a featured model for such clothing line brands as Baby Phat, Apple Bottoms, Sofia Vergara, Maggy London, Qristyl Fraizer Designs, Ashley Stewart, Rocawear, PZI Jeans, and Dereon.

Mendez has been added to many "curvy beauty" lists, including Centric's "Curvy Style - Curvy Models Who Are Slaying The Fashion Game", MSN Living Zimbio.com, ODDEE's "10 Incredibly Hot Women over a Size 10", and StyleBistro's "The Most Beautiful Plus Size Models". In 2009, FoxNews.com named Mendez one of the most notable top plus-size models in the industry, while The Source declared her as one of the most influential Latinas in the fall of 2009.

Mendez is one of the few plus-size models to ever walk in New York Fashion Week (2013, 2014, and 2016) integrated with straight-sized models, proving to critics that the beauty of fashion is for everyone and should be celebrated through body positivity.

In 2016, Mendez was industry selected as "Model of The Year" by Full Figured Fashion Week.

== Television appearances ==
Mendez was one of four models featured in BET's one-hour television special "Rip the Runway Model Search 2008". This behind-the-scenes model search show followed Mendez through auditions, makeovers and a day in her life. Mendez opened the "plus size" segment of the 2008 special and walked every year thereafter.

She has also appeared on nationwide shows such as Telemundo's ¡Qué Noche! con Angélica y Raúl, The Rachael Ray Show, The Today Show, Univision's Noticias al Despertar and Good Morning America.

== Charitable work ==
Mendez has served on the national board for Hispanic Support Organizations. Her work for the group includes organizing a scholarship gala for New York area students, and working with Habitat for Humanity and the Dress for Success Campaign. She was also a member of political advocacy group Women Barack! The Vote.

Mendez has lent her support and voice to a charity which hits close to home - Autism Speaks. Her son was diagnosed with autism at age two. Mendez has helped spread the word of autism awareness (especially to the Latino and African American communities, where diagnoses are sometimes ignored) as an advocate and spokesperson for the New York chapter for over 15 years.
