= Massachusetts House of Representatives' 16th Essex district =

American legislative district

Massachusetts House of Representatives' 16th Essex district in the United States is one of 160 legislative districts included in the lower house of the Massachusetts General Court. It covers part of the city of Lawrence and Methuen in Essex County. Since January 4, 2023 Francisco E. Paulino of the Democratic Party has represented the district following the 2022 Massachusetts House of Representatives election.

== Representatives ==
- George H. Chase, circa 1858
- Gustavus Attwill, circa 1859
- Francis Boardman, circa 1888
- James H. Richards, circa 1888
- Raymond H. Trefry, circa 1920
- Richard Lester Hull, circa 1951
- David J. Swartz, circa 1975
- Jose L. Santiago, 1999–2003
- William Lantigua, 2003–2010
- Marcos Devers, 2010–2017
- Juana Matias, 2017–2019
- Marcos Devers, 2019–2023
- Francisco E. Paulino, 2023–present

== Former locales ==
The district previously covered:

- part of Lynn, circa 1872
- Nahant, circa 1872

== See also ==
- List of Massachusetts House of Representatives elections
- Other Essex County districts of the Massachusetts House of Representatives: 1st, 2nd, 3rd, 4th, 5th, 6th, 7th, 8th, 9th, 10th, 11th, 12th, 13th, 14th, 15th, 17th, 18th
- Essex County districts of the Massachusett Senate: 1st, 2nd, 3rd; 1st Essex and Middlesex; 2nd Essex and Middlesex
- List of Massachusetts General Courts
- List of former districts of the Massachusetts House of Representatives

== Images ==
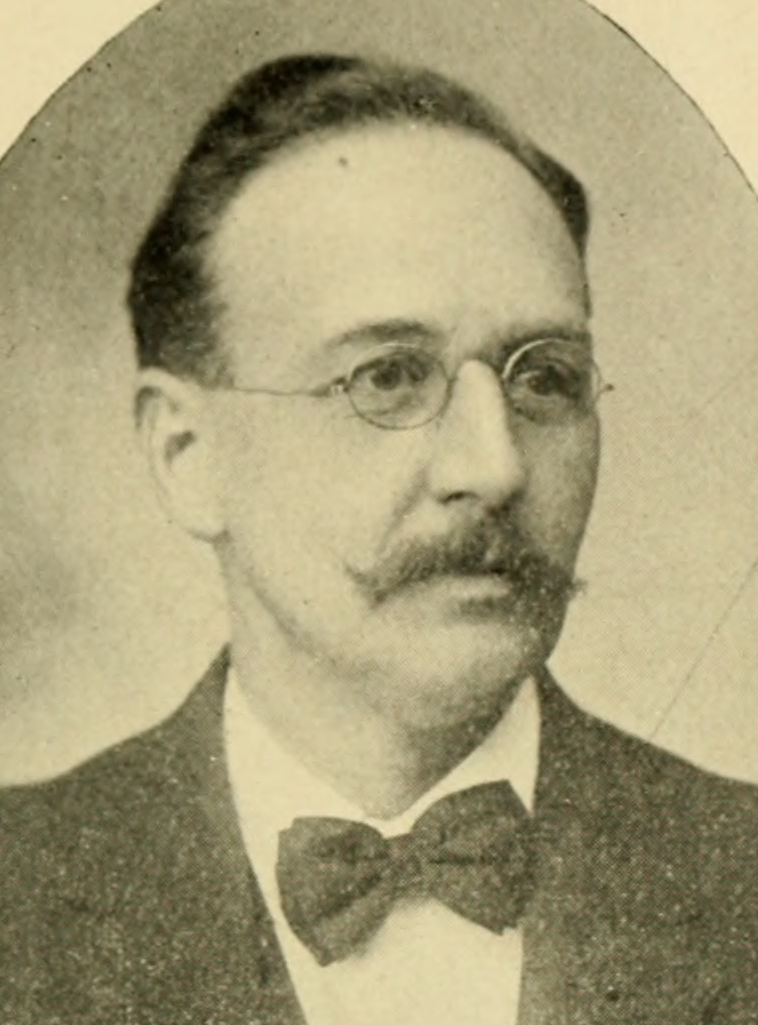
Arthur Adams

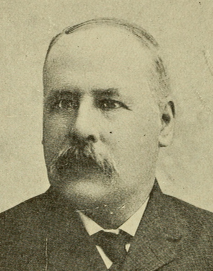
John Osborne

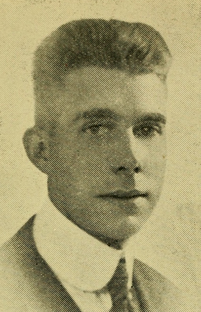
Fred Robbins Cooksey

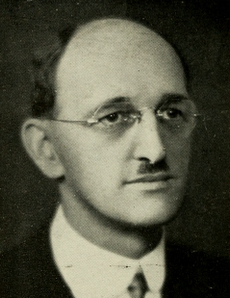
Frank Floyd

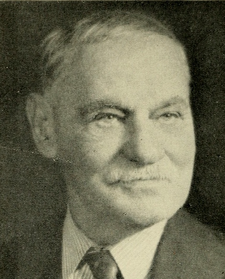
Charles Barrett

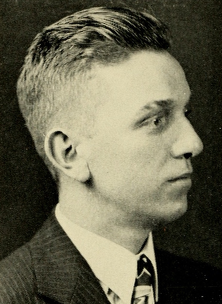
Richard Lester Hull

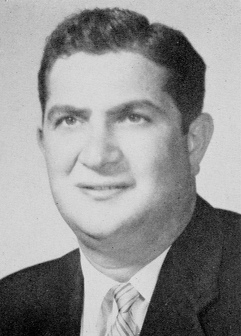
Francis Bevilacqua

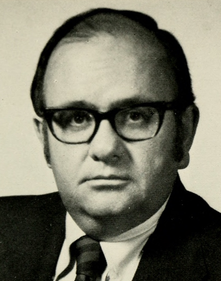
David Swartz

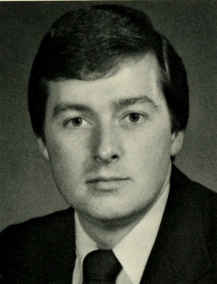
Kevin Blanchette

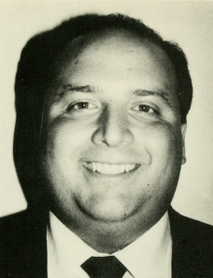
M. Paul Iannuccillo
