= William P. White (mayor) =

American politician (died 1938)

Mayor of Lawrence, Massachusetts
- In office 1909–1911
- Preceded by: John P. Kane
- Succeeded by: John T. Cahill
- In office 1920–1921
- Preceded by: John J. Hurley
- Succeeded by: Daniel W. Mahoney
- In office 1932–1933
- Preceded by: Michael A. Landers
- Succeeded by: Walter A. Griffin

Personal details
- Died: November 28, 1938 (aged 70) Lawrence, Massachusetts
- Party: Republican
- Occupation: Auctioneer

William P. White (died November 28, 1938) was an American politician who served as mayor of Lawrence, Massachusetts.

== First stint ==
White was the Republican nominee for Mayor in 1908. He defeated Democrat Michael F. Collins and Socialist L. B. Talbot with 62% of the vote. His eligibility for the office was questioned as White pled guilty to accepting a gift from a milk dealer while serving a milk inspector and chapter 210, section 7 of the revised statutes forbid someone who was accepted a bribe while in office from holding any public office again. White claimed that this statute did not apply to him because he was not a public officer when he was convicted. In March 1909, Edward F. Joyce, who had been removed from his position of dog officer by White, officially challenged the legality of White to serve as Mayor. White was reelected in 1909 over Democrat Dr. John T. Cahill and Socialist Joseph Donovan.

On May 18, 1910, White, his private secretary Matthew Degrey Ripon, Chief Engineer (head of the Fire Department) James A. Hamilton, former aldermen Matthew Burns and Xavier Legendre and six businessmen were indicted for bribery, conspiracy to bribe, and larceny. White was alleged to have conspired to bribe the aldermen in December 1909 to remove Hamilton from office. On July 13, White was found guilty and sentenced to three years in prison and fined $1,000. White continued to serve as Mayor while in jail until his resignation was accepted by the board of aldermen on July 25. On December 27, 1911, Governor Eugene Foss pardoned White on the unanimous recommendation of the Massachusetts Governor's Council on the grounds that the sentence he had received was excessive.

== Second stint ==
In 1919, White was elected to a two-year term as Mayor by a plurality of 2,877. He was defeated for reelection by Daniel W. Mahoney, 11,365 votes to 7,939.

In 1927, he ran for Alderman and Commissioner of Public Safety, but lost to incumbent Peter Carr.

== Third stint ==
In 1931, White defeated Robert S. Maloney 16,218 votes to 11,597 to return to the Mayor's office. In April 1933, White refused to authorize the sale of beer in Lawrence until the city was on better financial grounds and able to borrow money. This caused the city's social clubs to threaten a recall unless he began issuing licenses. In that year's primary election, White faced eleven challengers. He finished third behind first time candidate Walter A. Griffin and Alderman Robert F. Hancock with 2,905 votes to Griffin's 6,678 and Hancock's 4,630.

White died on November 28, 1938, at Burke Memorial Hospital in Lawrence at the age of 70.
