= Juana Matias =

Dominican-American politician

Member of the Massachusetts House of Representatives from the 16th Essex district
- In office January 2017 – January 2019
- Preceded by: Marcos Devers
- Succeeded by: Marcos Devers

Personal details
- Born: Dominican Republic
- Party: Democratic
- Education: University of Massachusetts Boston; Suffolk University Law School
- Occupation: Politician, attorney

Juana B. Matias is a Dominican-American politician and attorney who is the Massachusetts Secretary of Housing and Livable Communities. A member of the Democratic Party, she served in the Massachusetts House of Representatives from 2017 to 2019.

== Biography ==
Matias was born in the Dominican Republic, and her family moved to the United States when she was five years old. Matias earned her bachelor's degree in political science and criminal justice from the University of Massachusetts Boston and a Juris Doctor from Suffolk University Law School. She worked as an immigration advocate before going to work for her family's construction company, and she was admitted to the Massachusetts bar in June 2016. Matias ran successfully for the 16th Essex seat in the Massachusetts House of Representatives in the 2016 elections, defeating incumbent Marcos Devers by receiving 48.8% of the vote in a three-way race.

In 2017, Matias decided to forgo reelection to the state house and instead declared her candidacy for the United States House of Representatives in Massachusetts's 3rd congressional district, where Democratic Congresswoman Niki Tsongas had announced her retirement. Matias was criticized for claiming during her congressional campaign that she had worked as an "immigration attorney" when in fact she had been an "immigration advocate" who had not yet been admitted to the Massachusetts bar. Matias finished in fourth place in the Democratic Party primary.

Matias was appointed to the board of directors of MassINC in January 2019, and became its chief operating officer in March. President Joe Biden appointed Matias to be the regional administrator for the United States Department of Housing and Urban Development for New England. In 2026, she was appointed Massachusetts Secretary of Housing and Livable Communities by Governor Maura Healey.
