= Fernando Cabrera (writer) =

Dominican-American poet, essayist, visual artist, songwriter and professor

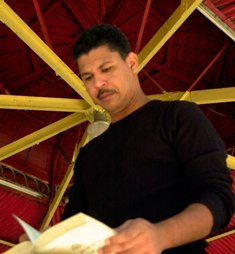
- Cabrera, November, 2009
- Born: Fernando de Jesús Reynoso Cabrera; May 30, 1964 (age 62); Santiago de los Caballeros, Dominican Republic
- Occupations: Poet, critics, story writer, visual artist and songwriter
- Writing career
- Period: 1990-present
- Website: fernandocabrera.com

Fernando Cabrera (born May 30, 1964 in Santiago de los Caballeros) is a Dominican-American poet, essayist, visual artist, songwriter and professor. He is a National Poetry and Literary Essay Prize Winner.

== Early life ==
Cabrera (full name Fernando de Jesús Reynoso Cabrera) was born in El Ensanche Libertad, a neighborhood of Santiago de los Caballeros, Dominican Republic. He was the first child in a family of five.

Cabrera graduated from Pontificia Universidad Catolica Madre y Maestra as PhD in Spanish Studies: Linguistics and Literature. His thesis "Utopian Writing of America: Dialogue between Walt Whitman and Pablo Neruda in Leaves of Grass and Canto General.", Was defended on June 15, 2018, with an outstanding cum laude rating. In addition, he is a graduate in Systems Engineering and Computing, and Master of Business Administration, at the Pontificia Universidad Católica Madre y Maestra, an institution where he has taught since 1991. In 1996 he took specialization courses at the University of Kentucky.

== Career ==
Cabrera is founding member and leader of the Collective of Artists of Santiago. Founded and directs the International Festival of Arts Arte Vivo. Cabrera has served several stints as president of the arts center Casa de Arte Inc. He is journalist of national and international magazines and newspapers specialized in arts and literature. The author is Member of the National Council of Culture of DR and of the House of the Dominican writer, and is a Corresponding Member of the Dominican Academy of the Spanish language. On November 26, 2026, he was elected as a member of the Commission on Linguistic and Literature of the Academy of Sciences of the Dominican Republic.

Fernando Jesus Reynoso Cabrera is the recipient of a number of honors for his artistic and social work including the following: Distinguished Visitor of the city of Providence, Rhode Island, 1998; Distinguished Visitor of the city of Ponce, Puerto Rico, 2000; Distinguished Son of the city of Santiago de los Caballeros, 2004; Guest of Honor, XIV Santo Domingo International Book Fair, 2011. Among the awards received for his literary work are: Casa de Teatro Poetry Prize 1992, Pedro Henríquez Ureña Poetry Prize 1996, National Poetry Prize UCE 2001, National Essays Award Pedro Henríquez Ureña 2008 and National Essays Award Pedro Henríquez Ureña 2010.

As visual creator have done covers and interiors illustrations for his books: Exile, Utopia and postmodernity, Four-leaf clover, and the collective book titled Johnny Pacheco in Outside Voices. He has performed individual and collective exhibitions in the art center named Casa de Teatro, Cultural Center of Santiago Ercilia Pepín, Museum of the Dominican Man, Consistorial Palace, Dominico-American Cultural Institute, Alliance Française and the National Dominican Library.

== Bibliography ==
- 1990 - Planos del Ocio, Poetry, Litost Editors
- 1992 - El árbol/The Tree, Poetry Prize Casa de Teatro, Editora Taller. Bilingual Edition. (Translated by Charlene Santos)
- 1996 - Ángel de Seducción/Angel of Seduction, National Poetry Prize Pedro Henríquez Ureña, Editora UNPHU. Bilingual Edition. (Translated by Charlene Santos)
- 2000 - Obra Poética 1990-96, Poetry Works 1990-96, Colección Fin de Siglo, Consejo Presidencial de Cultura
- 2000 - Imago Mundi, lecturas críticas, Essays, Colección Fin de Siglo, Consejo Presidencial de Cultura.
- 2001 - Destierros/Curriculum vitae, National Poetry Prize Universidad Central del Este
- 2008 - Utopía y Posmodernidad. Poesía Finisecular Dominicana, National Essay Prize Pedro Henríquez Ureña 2007, Colección EGRO, Editors of Dominican Literature Books.
- 2009 - Poetas Dominicanos. Voces con un merengue al fondo, Anthology of Dominican Poets, Literary magazine Blanco Móvil, no. 110, 88 pages, Mexico.
- 2011 - Trébol de Cuatro Hojas. Four-Leaf-Clover, Collected Poems, Ferilibro, Editora Nacional, Santo Domingo, Dominican Republic, 500 pages.
- 2012 - Ser poético. Ensayos sobre Poesía Dominicana contemporánea (Poetic. Essays on contemporary Dominican poetry). National prize of literary essays Pedro Henríquez Ureña 2011, published by Editora Nacional (National Editor), Ministry of Culture of Dominican Republic.
- 2012 - Santiago de los Caballeros. Visiones y latidos de la ciudad corazón (Visions and resonances of the City Heart). Culture Editions, Editora Nacional (National Editor), Ministry of Culture of Dominican Republic. (Dominican Critics Prize 2012 as publication specializing in visual arts).
- 2055 - Narciso. Novel. Sial Pigamalion Editor. Madri. Spain.
- 2026 - La utopía de América en Hojas de hierba, de Walt Whitman (Utopy of America in Leaves of Grass). National Prize of literary essays Pedro Henríquez Ureña 2026, published by Editora Nacioal (National Editor), Ministry of Culture of Dominican Republic.
