= Santi Deoleo =

American radio executive producer

Santiago Elvin Deoleo (born June 28, 1980) is a Boston, Massachusetts radio producer, personality, and fashion designer.

Deoleo was the executive producer of the Ramiro and the JAM'N 94.5 Morning Show on Jam'n 94.5. He also owns and operates Modus Collection Clothing, a chess-inspired line of men's and women's apparel.

== Background ==
Deoleo was born in the Dominican Republic. His parents moved the family to Passaic, New Jersey when he was two and then Salem, Massachusetts when he was five. After graduating from Salem High School in 1998 he earned a Communications degree from Endicott College in Beverly, Massachusetts.

Deoleo has run and completed The New York City Marathon and the Chicago Marathon, as well as competed in numerous triathlons. He is active in Crossfit, a "high-intensity strength and conditioning" fitness program.

== Career ==
In 2000, during his sophomore year at Endicott, he began an internship at Jam'n 94.5 for The Baltazar & Pebbles Morning Show doing audio production. Deoleo was hired as an associate producer in 2003. "I worked when they needed me, unpaid, and I made myself very visible. I learned whatever I could and I stayed in front of people's eyes." In 2001, Baltazar was replaced by current morning show host Ramiro Torres, who recognized Deoleo's talent at performing stunts. Ramiro gave him the nickname "Krazy Kulo" and subjected him to relentless bullying and often assigned him preposterous tasks to carry out live on-air. "I do it for the people, I do it for the entertainment, I do it to make him a sympathetic character. I bully him and people say, 'Wow he's bullying him!' but then they ultimately rally for Kulo."

Deoleo worked his way up to co-producer and in 2007 was promoted to Executive Producer of the morning show. "You have to be able to do anything, and don't be afraid to ask questions," Deoleo says. "People love to talk about themselves so if you ask them how they would fix a problem, they are always willing to help you out and explain it."

In December 2012, morning show co-hosts Pebbles (radio personality) and Melissa were let go by Clear Channel Communications. The show was renamed "Ramiro and The JAM'N 94.5 Morning Show," which saw Deoleo take on a more prominent on-air role as himself, rather than Krazy Kulo. In January 2013, Real World star Ashlee Feldman was named co-host of the revamped morning show.

In April 2012, Deoleo was named one of Stuff Boston's sexiest Bostonians, "a lineup of lovely, lust-worthy locals who represent a broad range of sexy styles".

On July 22, 2015, it was released that both Ramiro and Santi were released from the station, and that Ashlee Feldman and Frankie Vinci would host the show beginning the following Monday (July 27)

After several months off the air, mainly heading into 2016, in April, Santi was hired at Greater Media. He currently works as the Executive Producer for 102.5 WKLB (Country 102.5).

== Modus Collection ==
In September 2010, Deoleo launched Modus Collection Clothing. Having had a fervor for fashion since a young boy, one of Deoleo's dreams was to start his own clothing company. "Putting clothes together was one of my early loves in life. Some people can look at an old beat-up car or a couple of pieces of wood and see how, with some work, it could turn into a beautiful machine or a great piece of furniture. I see that with clothes, it's how I express myself." Each design, which Deoleo creates himself, is chess inspired, which comes from his lifelong passion for playing chess. The company's tagline is "What's Your Next Move".

In September 2011 he launched Modus Girl which he says "is more along the lines of the kind of shirts that can be worn out to the bar, as opposed to beach day apparel."

Modus Collection is available online and in boutiques throughout the Boston area.

== Good Rep Culture ==
In January 2013, Deoleo launched Good Rep Culture, a clothing line inspired by his love for Crossfit that "fuses fashion with elite fitness."
