= Patricia Dowling (Massachusetts politician) =

American politician and jurist

Mayor of Lawrence, Massachusetts
- In office 1998–2001
- Preceded by: Mary Claire Kennedy
- Succeeded by: Marcos Devers

Member of the Massachusetts Governor's Council from the 5th District
- In office 1995–2001
- Preceded by: Edward J. Carroll
- Succeeded by: Mary-Ellen Manning

Personal details
- Born: December 10, 1957 (age 68) Lawrence, Massachusetts
- Party: Democratic
- Education: Skidmore College; Suffolk University Law School
- Profession: Judge; Mayor; Attorney

Patricia A. Dowling is an American politician and jurist who was a justice of the Ipswich District Court.

== Early life ==
Dowling was born on December 10, 1957, in Lawrence, Massachusetts. She attended Skidmore College and Suffolk University Law School.

== Political career ==
Dowling served on the Massachusetts Governor's Council from 1995 to 2001. Concurrently, from 1998 to 2001 she was Mayor of Lawrence, Massachusetts. In 2000, she was defeated in her bid for reelection by Mary-Ellen Manning in Democratic primary.

== Judicial career ==
In 2001, Dowling was appointed to the Ipswich District Court and resigned as Mayor. She has since retired.
