= Jose Pimentel =

Bomb plotter

- Born: November 8, 1984 (age 41); Dominican Republic
- Citizenship: American
- Known for: Arrested for allegedly plotting to bomb New York City
- Criminal charges: 3 counts of terrorism-related crimes and two other counts
- Children: 1

Jose Pimentel (born November 8, 1984), also known as Muhammad Yusuf, is a naturalized U.S. citizen arrested on November 20, 2011, by the New York City Police Department for allegedly plotting to bomb New York City.

== Early life ==
Pimentel is originally from the Dominican Republic and moved to the United States when he was five years old. In 2004, he moved to Schenectady, New York, to attend college and converted to Islam that same year. In December 2005, he was arrested for buying a computer with stolen credit card information he got while working at a Circuit City in Albany, New York.

== Bomb plot ==
Pimentel's alleged targets included U.S. troops returning home from Iraq and Afghanistan. Pimentel is reported to have shown theological interest in Anwar al-Awlaki, posting at least fifteen video clips of the extremist cleric to his YouTube account and posting materials from Awlaki and other terrorists on his website, trueislam1.com. After his arrest, information surfaced that the FBI had declined to get involved in the case as they thought Pimentel was incapable of successfully executing the attack and was merely mentally unstable. The Huffington Post reported that Pimentel smoked marijuana with the NYPD's cooperating informant in the case, and was likely high when making some of the incriminating statements recorded by police. Police outlets claim that he was planning to change his name to Osama Hussein to celebrate his heroes Osama bin Laden and Saddam Hussein, though these claims have been heavily disputed by members of the Hamilton Heights community.

== See also ==
- José Padilla (prisoner)
