= Marcos Devers =

American politician (born 1950)

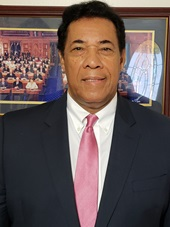

Member of the Massachusetts House of Representatives from the 16th Essex district
- In office January 2019 – January 4, 2023
- Preceded by: Juana Matias
- Succeeded by: Francisco E. Paulino
- In office July 8, 2010 – January 2017
- Preceded by: William Lantigua
- Succeeded by: Juana Matias

Acting Mayor of Lawrence, Massachusetts
- In office September 2001 – November 8, 2001
- Preceded by: Patricia Dowling
- Succeeded by: Michael J. Sullivan

President of the Lawrence, Massachusetts City Council
- In office January 2002 – January 2004
- Preceded by: Joseph Quartarone
- Succeeded by: Patrick Blanchette

Member of the Lawrence, Massachusetts City Council
- In office January 2000 – January 2006

Personal details
- Born: October 25, 1950 (age 75) Santo Domingo, Dominican Republic
- Party: Democratic
- Education: Universidad Autónoma de Santo Domingo (BS)

Marcos A. Devers (born October 25, 1950) is a former member of the Massachusetts House of Representatives. Devers also is a former acting mayor of Lawrence, Massachusetts; when he served as acting mayor from September to November 2001, he became the first Dominican-American to execute the role of mayor in the United States and the first Latino mayor in Massachusetts.

== Early life and career ==
Marcos Devers was born in Santo Domingo, Dominican Republic, and attended grammar school in Villa Duarte, a barrio in the eastern part of the city. He graduated from secondary school and received a bachelor's degree in civil engineering from the Universidad Autónoma de Santo Domingo in 1978. Marcos received additional education and training in Japan and Italy in remote sensing during the 1980s. He was a math instructor at Santurce Community College, Santurce, Puerto Rico from 1984 to 1986. He later went on to write technical papers for infrastructure development in the Dominican Republic.

In 1982 Marcos left the Dominican Republic and moved to Puerto Rico, where three of his four children were born. In 1987, he moved to Lawrence, Massachusetts. Marcos attended Salem State College and the University of Massachusetts Lowell to complete the academic requirements to become a certified educator in the Commonwealth of Massachusetts. Marcos taught high school level mathematics at both Lawrence High School and the Greater Lawrence Technical High School for sixteen years. He is also the founder and C.E.O. of MDJ Incorporated Engineering & Construction, a civil engineering firm.

== Family ==
Marcos has been married to his wife, Vicky, since 1986. They are the parents of four children.

== Political career ==
In 1991 Devers decided to run for an at-large seat on the Lawrence City Council. Marcos was finally elected to the City Council in November 1999 on his fifth attempt. He was then re-elected to his seat in 2001 and 2003. As a City Councilor, Marcos has held the positions of Council Vice President (2000–2002), Council President (2002–2004), and Interim Mayor upon the resignation of Mayor Dowling in September 2001 until November 2001. When Marcos was elected the Interim Mayor, he became the first Latino mayor in Massachusetts and the first mayor of Dominican descent in the United States.

Devers then ran for mayor in 2005 losing to incumbent Michael J. Sullivan. He ran again for the 2009 Mayoral election and came in third. Devers also ran for state representative in 2006 and 2008 against former state representative (and former Lawrence Mayor) William Lantigua. The 2006 campaign was a write-in campaign because Lantigua was able to have Devers knocked-off of the ballot.

=== Massachusetts House of Representatives ===
In the 2010 special election to succeed William Lantigua for the Massachusetts House of Representatives 16th Essex District. Lantigua endorsed Devers for the North Lawrence Representative seat after Devers endorsed Lantigua for mayor, after Devers came in third behind Lantigua and former city councilor David Abdoo in the 2009 municipal primary.

On June 15, 2010, Devers was elected by a majority of 1,198 votes to the Massachusetts House of Representatives over independent candidate Rafael Gadea. Devers received 1,369 votes, challenger Rafael Gadea received 171 votes. Devers was the elected to a full term in Nov. 2010 over Republican Enrique Matos and Independent Rafael Gadea with 4,495 votes and more than 75% of the vote. Devers currently serves as a member of the Joint Committees on Transportation, Education, Economic Development and Emerging Technologies and as Vice Chair of the Joint Committee on Children, Families and Persons with Disabilities. He is a member of the Massachusetts Black and Latino Legislative Caucus.

In the 2016 primary election, Devers lost to Juana Matias. Devers ran for the seat again in 2018. He won the Democratic nomination for his old seat on September 4 against former Lawrence Mayor William Lantigua. He faced no opposition in November and was subsequently re-elected to his old seat. In 2022, he was defeated for re-nomination by Francisco Paulino.

== See also ==
- 2019–2020 Massachusetts legislature
- 2021–2022 Massachusetts legislature

Political offices
Preceded by Patricia Dowling	Acting Mayor of Lawrence; September – November 2001	Succeeded by Michael J. Sullivan
Preceded by Joseph Quartarone	President of the Lawrence City Council; January 2002 – January 2004	Succeeded by Patrick Blanchette
Preceded by William Lantigua	Member of the Massachusetts House of Representatives; 16th Essex District; July 8th 2010	Succeeded by Juana Matias
