= American Automobile and Power Company =

Defunct American motor vehicle manufacturer

- Founded: 1904
- Defunct: 1905
- Successor: Maine Alpaca Company

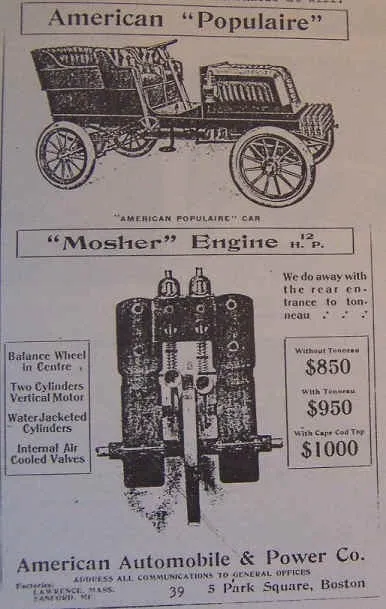
Advertisement for the American Populaire

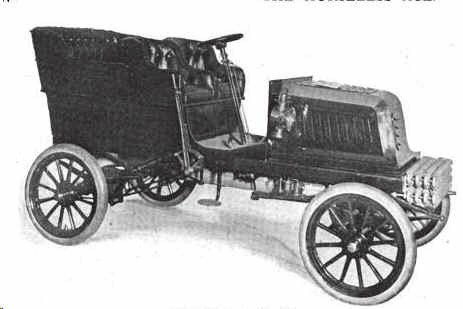
1904 American Populaire Tonneau

The American Automobile and Power Company was an American Brass Era car manufacturer, incorporated in Sanford, Maine, in 1903. They produced the American Populaire during 1904 and 1905.

Starting with a capital of $500,000, the company incorporated on December 9, 1903. There were eight officers, three from Boston, Massachusetts, the rest locals; Bostonian Henry D. Long was treasurer, Sanfordian Ernest M. Goodall president.

With a design from Edward O. Mosher, AEC produced a prototype in a shed in Lawrence, Massachusetts, debuting it at the Boston Automobile Show in March 1904.

The company offered three models, all with Mosher's 12 hp (8 kW) two-cylinder engine, on the same 84 in (2134 mm) wheelbase: a $850 roadster, a $950 tonneau (which had an unusual swing-out split front seat), and a $1000 Cape Cod Tourer. By contrast, the Yale side-entrance tourer sold for $1000, the Model S $700, the high-volume Oldsmobile Runabout went for $650, Western's Gale Model A was $500, a Brush Runabout was $485, the Black from $375, and the Success was $250. At the upper end of the AEC range, a Cole 30 or Colt Runabout was priced at $1500, while an Enger 40 was $2000.

While Long bragged, "We could sell one thousand cars in three months if we could make them", by April 1905, production had ceased and the Maine Alpaca Company had taken over the factory.

== See also ==
- List of automobile manufacturers
- List of defunct automobile manufacturers

== Sources ==
- Clymer, Floyd. Treasury of Early American Automobiles, 1877–1925. New York: Bonanza Books, 1950.
- Kimes, Beverly Rae. The Standard Catalog of American Cars, 1805–1942. Iola, Wisconsin: Krause Publications, 1989. ISBN 0-87341-111-0.
