= Saginaw (disambiguation) =

Saginaw is a city in the state of Michigan.

Saginaw may also refer to:

== Places in the United States ==
=== In Michigan ===
- Saginaw Charter Township, Michigan, a township, containing two census-designated places:
  - Saginaw Township North, Michigan
  - Saginaw Township South, Michigan
- Saginaw County, Michigan, a county in Michigan
- Saginaw River, a river in the state of Michigan
- Saginaw Bay, a bay within Lake Huron on the eastern side of the state of Michigan
- Saginaw Trail, a set of connected roads in Michigan
- Saginaw City, Michigan and East Saginaw, Michigan, former cities in Saginaw County, Michigan, that merged in 1890 to become the modern city of Saginaw

=== Other states ===
- Saginaw, Alabama, an unincorporated community
- Saginaw, Arkansas, an unincorporated community
- Saginaw, Minnesota, an unincorporated area
- Saginaw, Missouri, a village
- Saginaw, Oregon, an unincorporated community
- Saginaw, Pennsylvania, a census designated place
- Saginaw, Texas, a Fort Worth suburb

== Ships ==
- USS Saginaw
- USS Saginaw Bay (CVE-82)
- MV Saginaw, a lake freighter operated by Lower Lakes Towing
- SS West Saginaw, a Design 1013 cargo ship

== Automobiles ==
- Saginaw (automobile), a former automobile manufacturer (1914)
- Saginaw Motor Company, a name considered by the former automobile manufacturer Yale (1916)
- Saginaw Speedster, another name for Detroit Cyclecar, a former cyclecar

== Other uses ==
- Saginaw Spirit, a hockey team playing in the Ontario Hockey League based in Saginaw, Michigan
- "Saginaw, Michigan" (song), a song by Lefty Frizzell
- Saginaw Valley State University, near Saginaw, Michigan
  - Saginaw Valley State Cardinals, its sports teams
- Saginaw Steering, a former division of General Motors, now known as Nexteer Automotive
- Treaty of Saginaw, a 19th-century land treaty in Michigan
- Fort Saginaw Mall, a former shopping center near Saginaw, Michigan
- Saginaw Chippewa Tribal Nation, a Native American tribe in Central Michigan
- Saginaw Chippewa Tribal College in Mount Pleasant, Michigan
- Roman Catholic Diocese of Saginaw
