= Railsbach =

American two-seat cyclecar

The Railsbach was an automobile built in Saginaw, Michigan by L. M. Railsbach, in 1914.

L. M. Railsbach, a draughtsman for the Valley Boat & Engine Company, classed the vehicle as a light car, but with its wheel track of 3-ft, it would make it a cyclecar. The two-seater sold for $350. It had a water-cooled 4-cylinder, 1.2L engine. L. M. Railsbach did not incorporate a company and the factory used for production is not known.
