= Yale (1916 automobile) =

American automobile

The Yale was a Brass Era car manufactured in Saginaw, Michigan from 1916 to 1918, not to be confused with the Yale from Toledo, Ohio.

The man behind this Yale was Louis J. Lampke, who previously had been with Palmer-Singer and Lion. He then created a car he had designed himself, this was the MPM of Mount Pleasant, Michigan. In early 1915, Lampke travelled to Saginaw in order to acquire funding to transfer his company there. Apparently, the people of Saginaw were not interested in the MPM, but were interested in Lampke himself. He therefore stayed in town and created the Saginaw Motor Company in June 1916. Various local businessmen were in the executive positions, while Lampke was in charge of product development. The plan was to call the automobile the Saginaw, but the Lehr Motor Company across town had already beaten them to the name. The Saginaw Motor people thus got together and settled on the Yale name.

== Vehicle specifications ==
The Yale would be V8-powered only, in contrast to the four- and eight-cylinder engines of the MPM. The Yale was also larger and more luxurious than the MPM, with prices starting at US$1350. The former Argo Electric factory at Jefferson and Atwater in town was secured and production of seven-passenger Touring cars commenced in July 1916. This was the only body style offered the first year. With the coming of the new year, two new body styles were added, namely a roadster and a speedster with a rumble seat. All three models rode on the same 126 inch wheelbase and cost US$1550.

== Production ==
The company announced its intentions to produce closed cars, but it is unlikely that any were made. In January 1918, the price had increased yet again, this time to US$1885, but by now the end was near. Production ceased in March of the same year, and Puritan of Detroit acquired the right to the parts and to service the cars. In April, the factory was purchased by the makers of Jumbo trucks.
