= Sagina (disambiguation) =

Sagina is a genus of flowering plants.

Sagina may also refer to:

- Sagina (film), a 1974 Hindi film

== See also ==
- Sagina Mahato, a 1970 Bengali film
- Saginaw (disambiguation)
