= Rumbo (newspaper) =

Free weekly bilingual newspaper

- Type: Weekly newspaper
- Format: Compact
- Owner(s): Dalia Diaz and Alberto Surís
- Publisher: SUDA, Inc.
- Editor: Dalia Diaz
- Founded: 1996
- Language: English and Spanish
- Headquarters: 60 Island St., Lawrence, Massachusetts 01843; United States
- Circulation: Regional Edition: Massachusetts: Lawrence, Methuen, Haverhill, Andover, North Andover, and Lowell New Hampshire: Salem, Nashua, and Manchester
- Price: Free
- Website: rumbonews.com

Rumbo is a free weekly newspaper published in Lawrence, Massachusetts, United States, covering the Merrimack Valley and southern New Hampshire. It is bilingual, in English and Spanish.

== History ==
Prior to 2014, the paper would publish two editions - a regional edition and the local edition every other week making it a bi-weekly paper in some areas but weekly in Lawrence and Methuen. In January 2014, the newspaper merged the two editions into one, making it a weekly regional newspaper. March 15.2020 was its last print edition. Its last edition was on May 15, 2025
