= Essex Company Machine Shop =

- U.S. National Register of Historic Places
- U.S. Historic district – Contributing property
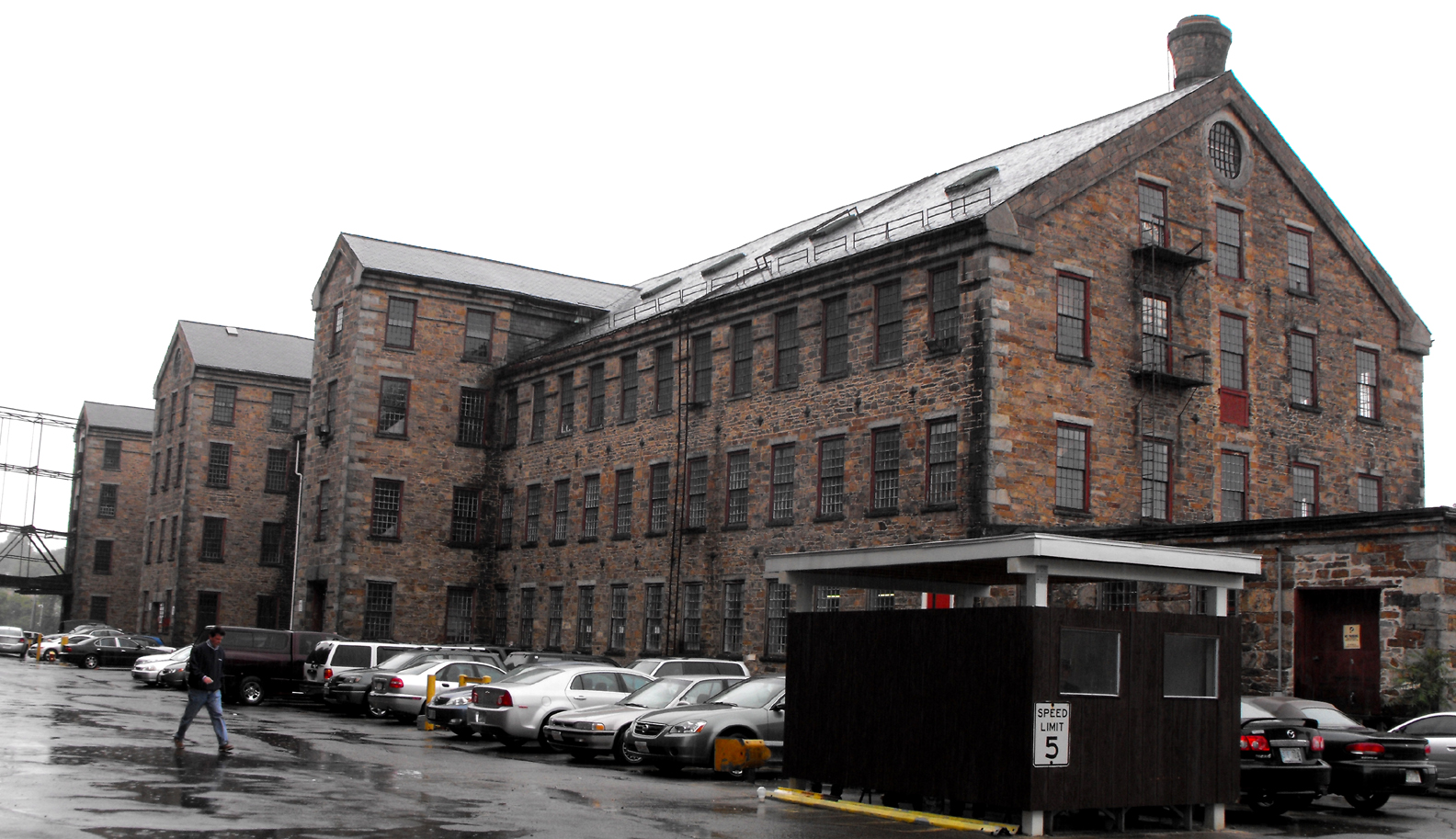

- Location within Massachusetts Location within the United States
- Location: Lawrence, Massachusetts
- Coordinates: 42°42′34″N 71°9′17″W
- Built: 1846
- Part of: North Canal Historic District (ID84000417)
- NRHP reference No.: 72000138

Significant dates
- Added to NRHP: November 9, 1972
- Designated CP: November 13, 1984

Essex Company Machine Shop, also known as Stone Mill or the Lawrence Machine Shop, is a historic machine shop on Union Street in Lawrence, Massachusetts. It was built in 1846 and added to the National Register of Historic Places in 1972.

== History ==
The Essex Company was incorporated on March 20, 1845, for the purpose of creating a manufacturing town on the Merrimack River. The town eventually became Lawrence.

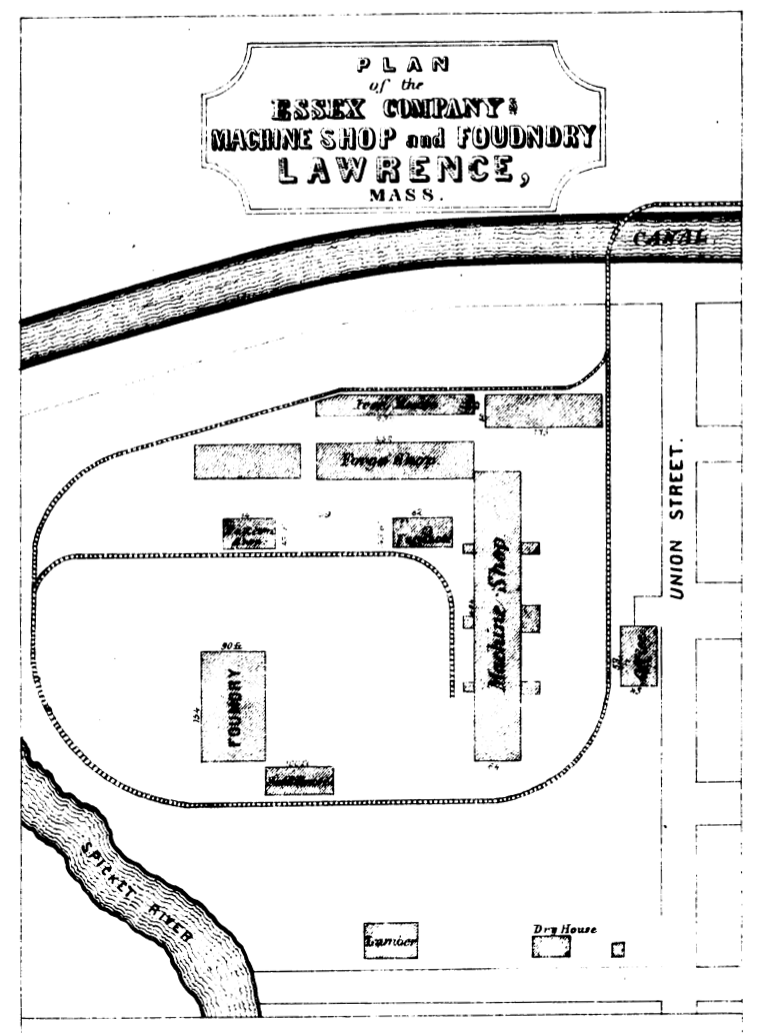
Site plan of the Essex Company complex as it appeared in 1850. Note that north is at the bottom of the plan.

To attract manufacturers, the Essex Company dammed the river with the Great Stone Dam and created a canal to provide a power source for future businesses. The machine shop was created at the head of the canal as part of a foundry to service the Essex Company and tenant manufacturers. The facility consisted of the machine shop, a foundry, a forge shop containing 32 forges, and a chimney connected via an underground flue to the forges. The entire complex was warmed by steam and had power provided by two Fourneyron water turbines.

A branch of the Boston and Maine Railroad encircled the complex to allow for delivery of raw materials and coal.

In 1850, the complex employed 400 but was designed with the capacity to employ 800-1000 workers.

== Description of the building ==
The machine shop building is one of the few remaining structures from the original Essex Company site. It is 404 feet (123 m) long and 64 feet (20 m) wide. It is four stories high and was designed to allow access to steam locomotives. The other surviving structure is the 142' (43 m) high chimney.

== See also ==
- National Register of Historic Places listings in Lawrence, Massachusetts
- National Register of Historic Places listings in Essex County, Massachusetts
