= Lawrence, Massachusetts =

- City
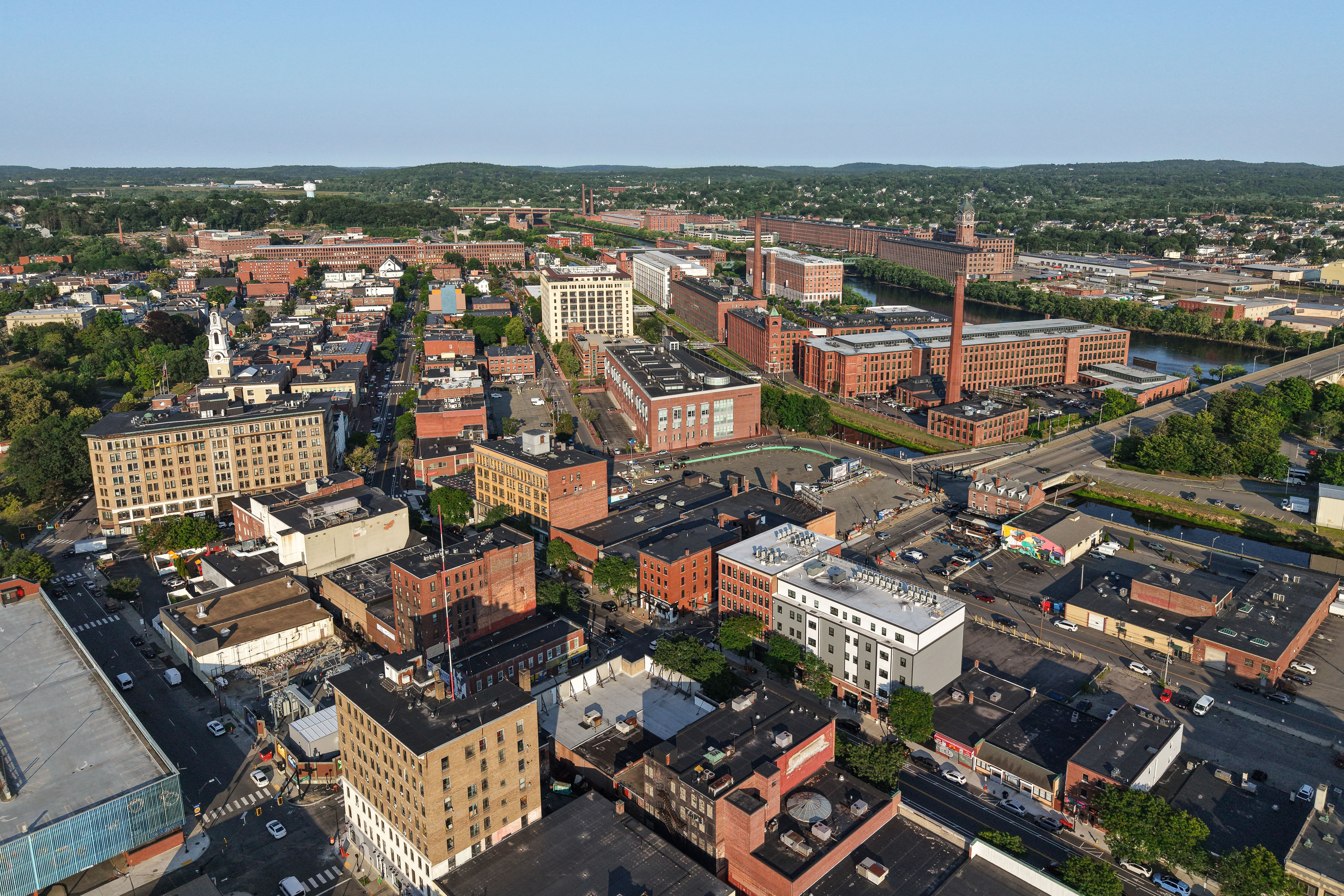
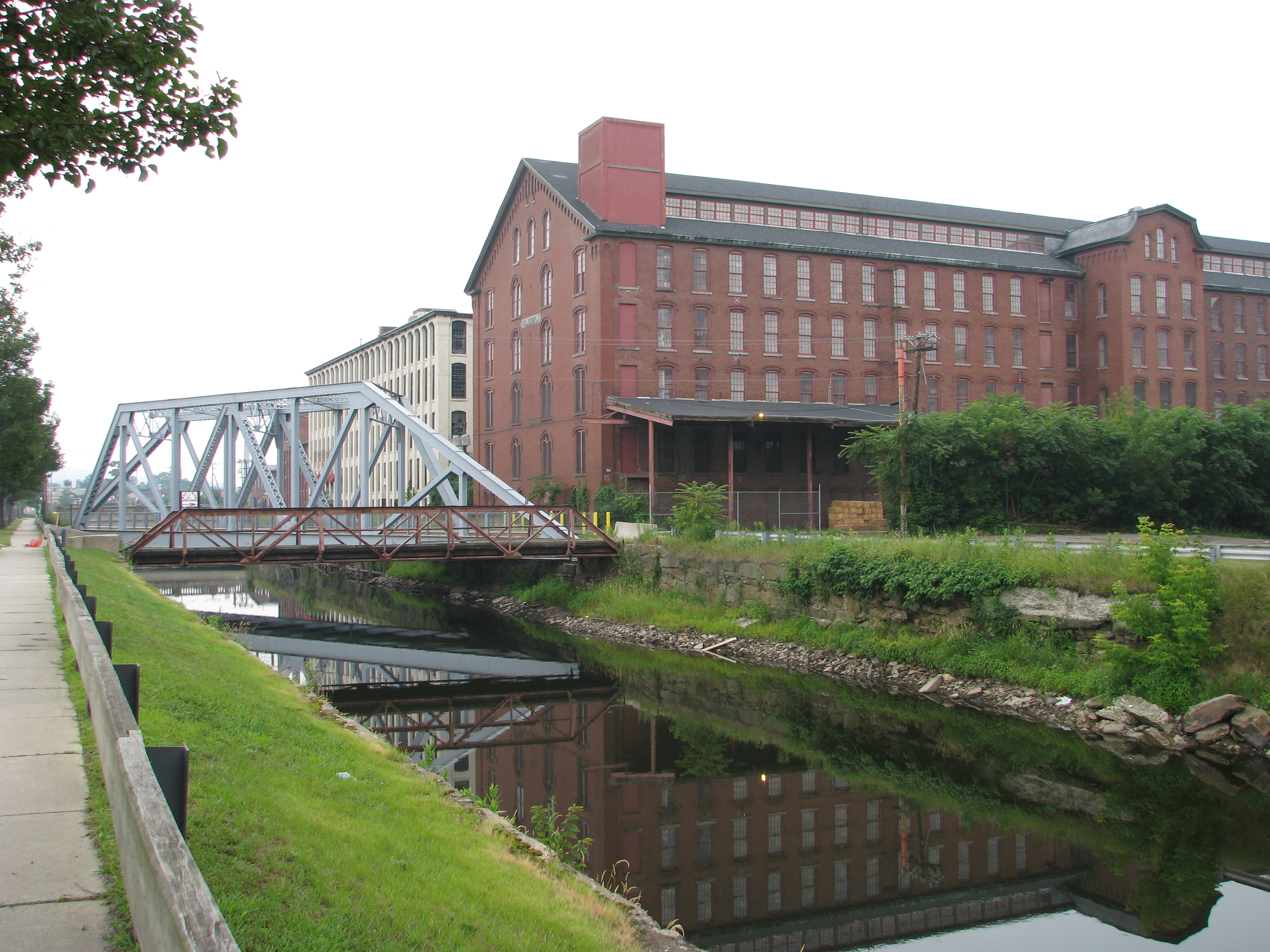
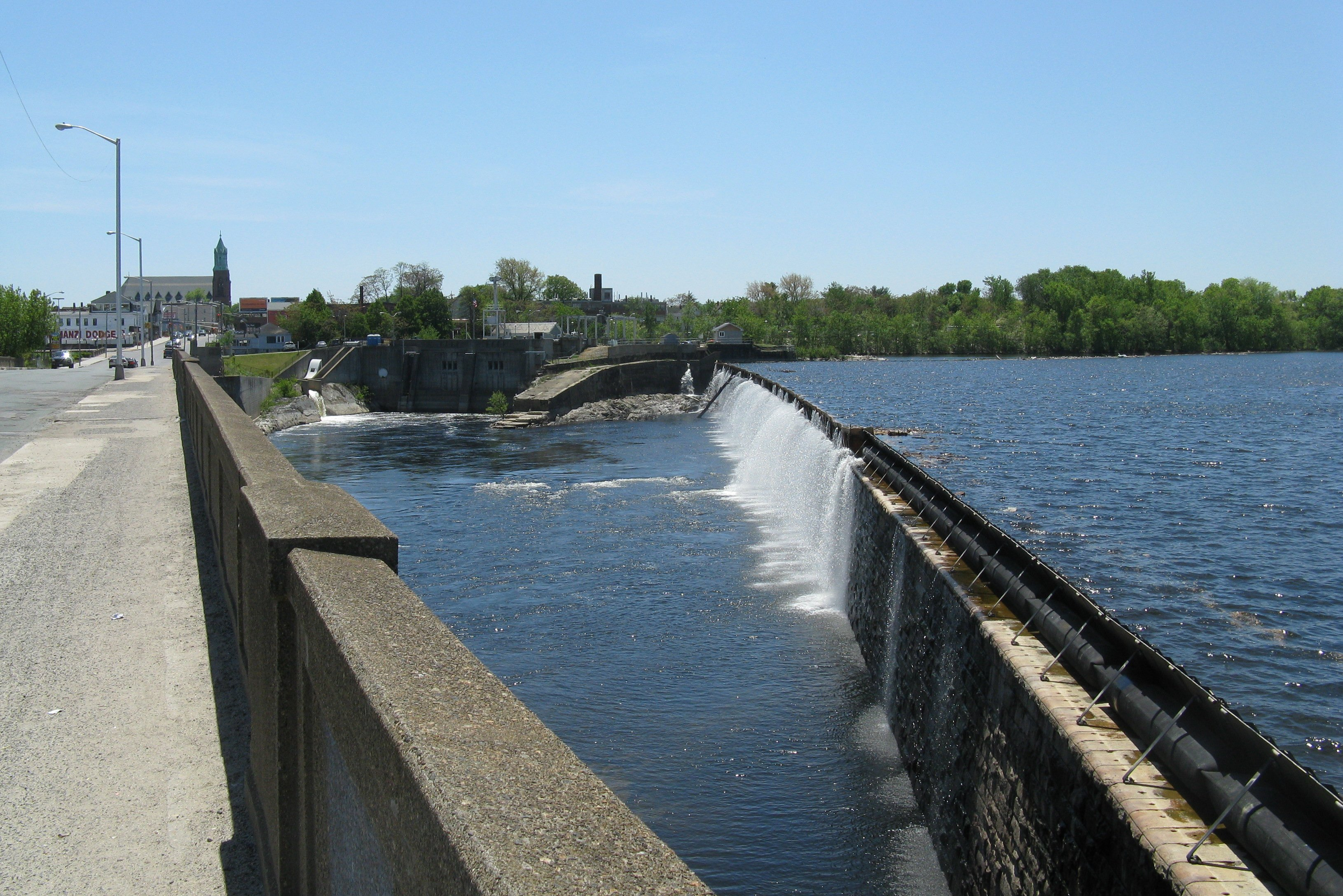
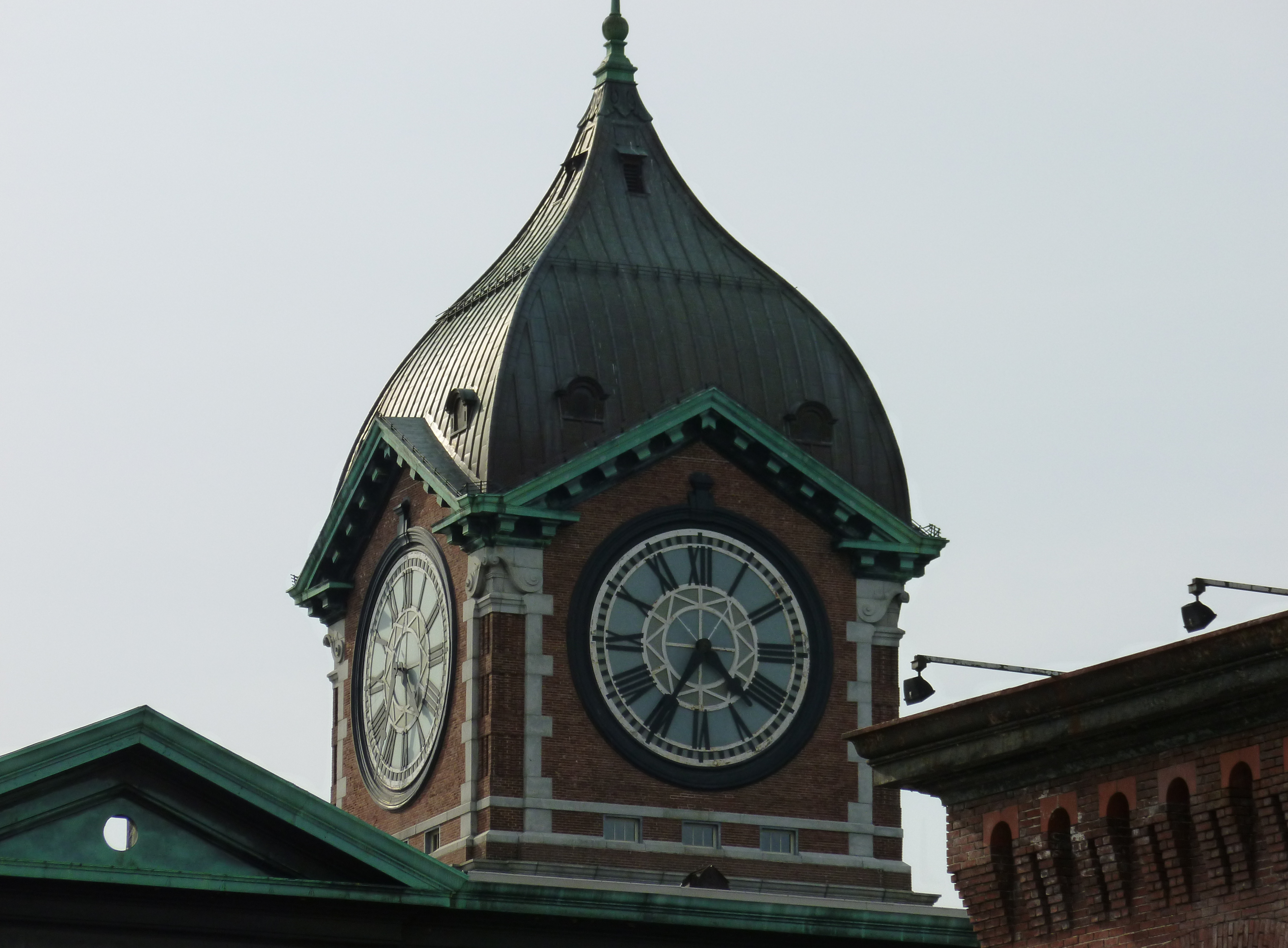
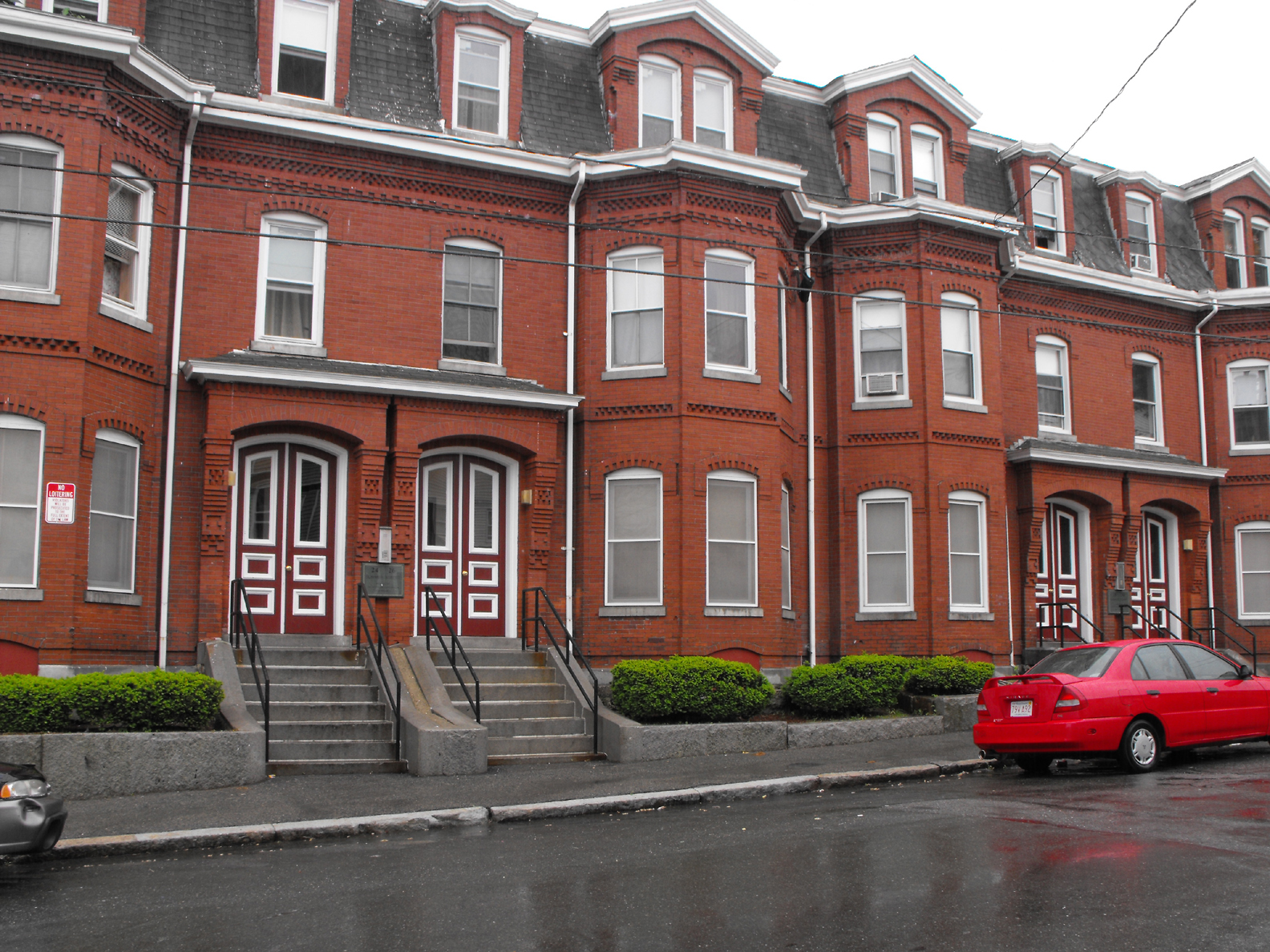
- Downtown Lawrence North Canal Great Stone Dam Ayer Mills clock tower Historic rowhouses

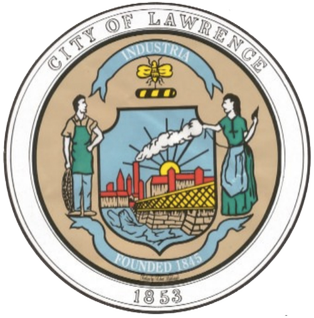
- Flag Seal
- Motto(s): Industria (Latin) "Industry"
- Location in Essex County, Massachusetts.

- Location in the United States Lawrence (the United States)
- Coordinates: 42°42′25″N 71°09′49″W
- Country: United States
- State: Massachusetts
- County: Essex
- Region: New England
- Settled: 1655
- Incorporated: 1847
- Incorporated (city): 1853
- Founder: Essex Company
- Named for: Abbott Lawrence

Government
  - Type: Mayor–council
  - Mayor: Brian De Peña
  - City council: Jeovanny A. Rodrigueze (Council President); Stephany Infante (Vice-President, District E); Celina Reyes (at-large); Ana Levy (at-large); Fidelina Santiago (District A); Wendy Luzon (District B); Gregory Del Rosario (District C); Vivian Marmol (District D); Marc LaPlant (District F)

Area
  - Total: 7.43 sq mi (19.24 km^{2})
  - Land: 6.93 sq mi (17.95 km^{2})
  - Water: 0.50 sq mi (1.29 km^{2})
- Elevation: 16 ft (4.9 m)

Population (2020)
  - Total: 89,143
  - Density: 12,863.8/sq mi (4,966.73/km^{2})
- Time zone: UTC−5 (Eastern)
  - Summer (DST): UTC−4 (EDST)
- ZIP Codes: 01840–01843
- Area code: 351/978
- FIPS code: 25-34550
- Website: www.cityoflawrence.com

Lawrence is a city located in Essex County, Massachusetts, United States, on the Merrimack River. At the 2020 census the city had a population of 89,143. Surrounding communities include Methuen to the north, Andover to the southwest, and North Andover to the east. Lawrence and Salem were the county seats of Essex County, until the state abolished county government in 1999. Lawrence is part of the Merrimack Valley.

Manufacturing products of the city include electronic equipment, textiles, footwear, paper products, computers, and foodstuff. Lawrence was the residence of the poet Robert Frost for his early school years; his essays and poems were first published in the Lawrence High School newspaper. Lawrence is also the birthplace of composer and conductor Leonard Bernstein in 1918, and singer Robert Goulet in 1933.

== History ==
=== Indigenous history ===
Native Americans lived along the Merrimack River for thousands of years before European colonization of the Americas. Evidence of farming at Den Rock Park and arrowhead manufacturing on the site where the Wood Mill now sits have been discovered.

At the time of contact in the early 1600s, the Pennacook or Pentucket had a presence north of the Merrimack, while Massachusett, Naumkeag, and Agawam controlled territory south of the river. The territory which would later be aggregated into the city of Lawrence was purchased from Pennacooks Sagahew and Passaquo in 1642 for the English settlement of Haverhill, and from Massachusett sachem Cutshamekin in 1646 as a post-hoc payment for the lands surrounding the English settlement of Andover (modern-day North Andover center).

=== Founding and rise as a textile center ===
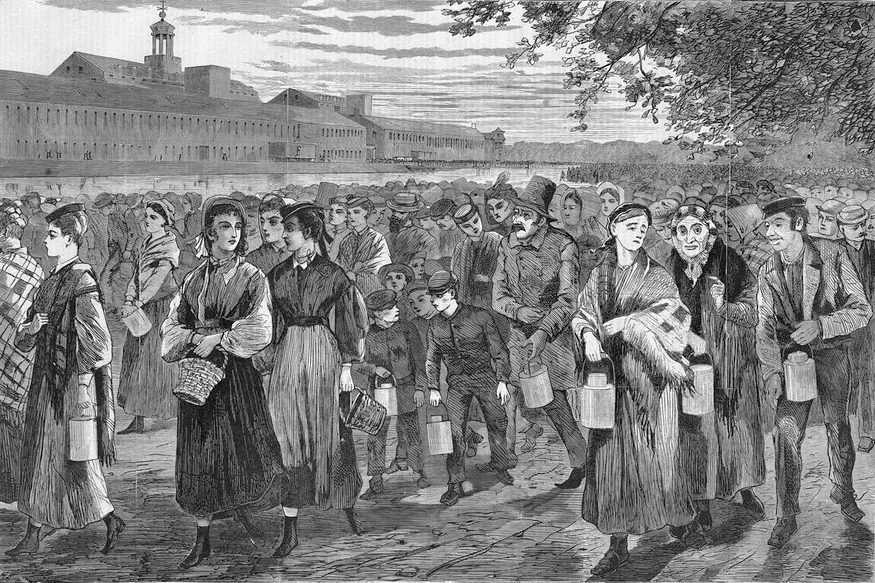
Washington Mills in Lawrence (1868), by Winslow Homer

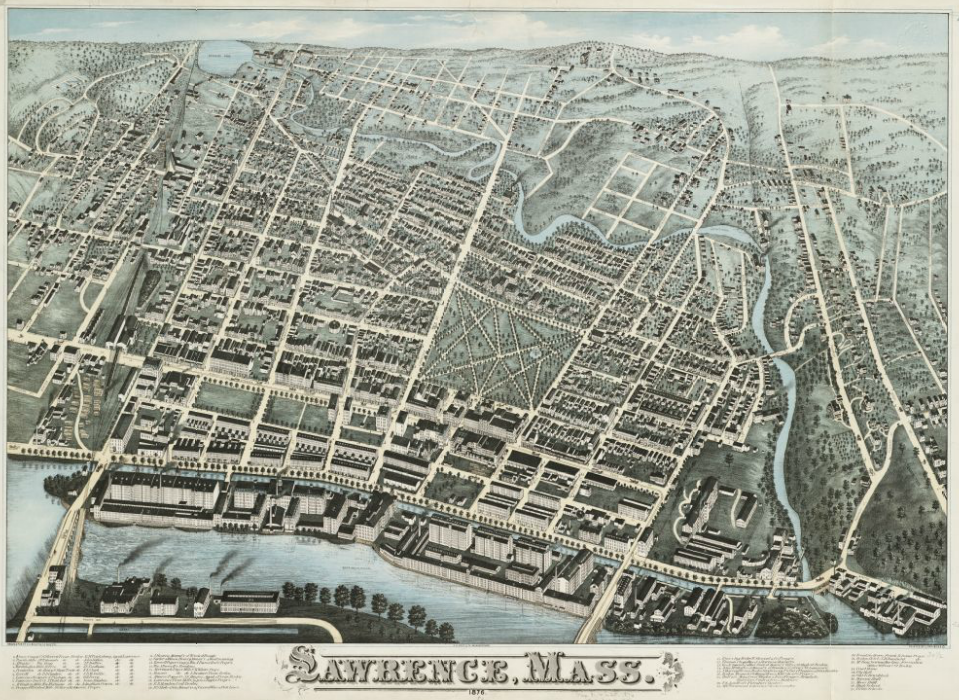
Map of Lawrence, 1876

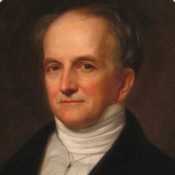
Ambassador Abbott Lawrence, by George Peter Alexander Healy

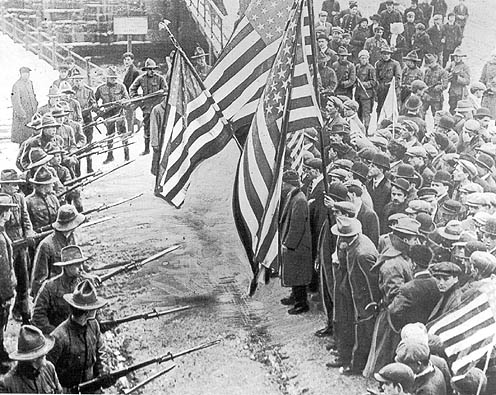
Massachusetts National Guardsmen with fixed bayonets surround a parade of strikers during the 1912 Lawrence textile strike

Europeans first settled the Haverhill area in 1640, colonists from Newbury following the Merrimack River in from the coast. The area that would become Lawrence was then part of Methuen and Andover. The first settlement within the present-day city limits came in 1655 with the establishment of a blockhouse in Shawsheen Fields, now South Lawrence.

The future site of the city (formerly parts of Andover and Methuen) was purchased by a consortium of local industrialists. The Water Power Association members: Abbott Lawrence, Edmund Bartlett, Thomas Hopkinson of Lowell, John Nesmith and Daniel Saunders, had purchased control of Peter's Falls on the Merrimack River and hence controlled Bodwell's Falls the site of the present Great Stone Dam. The group allotted fifty thousand dollars to buy land along the river to develop. In 1844, the group petitioned the legislature to act as a corporation, known as the Essex Company, which incorporated on April 16, 1845. The first excavations for the Great Stone Dam to harness the Merrimack River's water power were done on August 1, 1845. The Essex Company would sell the water power to corporations such as the Arlington Mills, as well as organize the construction of mills and build to suit. Until 1847, when the state legislature recognized the community as a town, it was called interchangeably the "New City", "Essex" or "Merrimac". The post office, built in 1846, used the designation "Merrimac". The city was incorporated in 1853, and named for Abbott Lawrence.

Canals were dug on both the north and the south banks to provide power to the factories that would soon be built on its banks, as both mill owners and workers from across the city and the world flocked to the city in droves; many were Irish laborers who had experience with similar building work. The work was dangerous; injuries and even death were common.

==== Bread and Roses Strike of 1912 ====
The Pemberton Mill collapse occurred on January 10, 1860, in Lawrence, Massachusetts. The five-story textile mill, built in 1853, was a major employer, particularly of Irish immigrants, many of whom were women and children. Around 600–800 workers were inside at the time of the collapse, though estimates vary. The official death toll was 88, with estimates of 116–145 deaths and hundreds injured, many permanently disabled. The disaster was one of the deadliest industrial accidents in U.S. history. Investigations pinned the collapse on substandard construction, specifically defective cast-iron columns that were too weak to support the mill's weight. Poor oversight, cost-cutting by owners, and overloading the structure with heavy machinery exacerbated the issue. The mill had been known to vibrate heavily during operation, a warning sign that had been ignored. As immigrants flooded into the United States in the mid-to-late 19th century, the population of Lawrence abounded with skilled and unskilled workers from several countries. Protesting conditions, in 1912 they walked out of the mills. The action, sometimes celebrated as the Bread and Roses Strike, was one of the more important, widely reported, labor struggles in American history.

The Industrial Workers of the World (the "One Big Union", the "Wobblies") defied the common wisdom that a largely female and ethnically divided workforce could not be organized, and the strike held through two bitterly cold winter months. The 15-year-old mill-hand Fred Beal, who was drawn by the experience into a lifetime of labor organizing, recalls that contrary to expectations, it was the most recent immigrant groups, "the Italians, Poles, Syrians [Lebanese] and Franco-Belgians", who "kept it alive".

After hundreds of the strikers' hungry children had been sent to sympathetic families in New York, New Jersey, and Vermont, and the U.S. Congress was induced to hold hearings, the mill owners decided to settle, giving workers in Lawrence and throughout New England raises of up to 20 percent. However, in the decades that followed, the mill owners moved their capital and employment out of Lawrence and the region to the non-union South—as a young Massachusetts Senator, John F. Kennedy, was later to record.

=== Post-War history ===
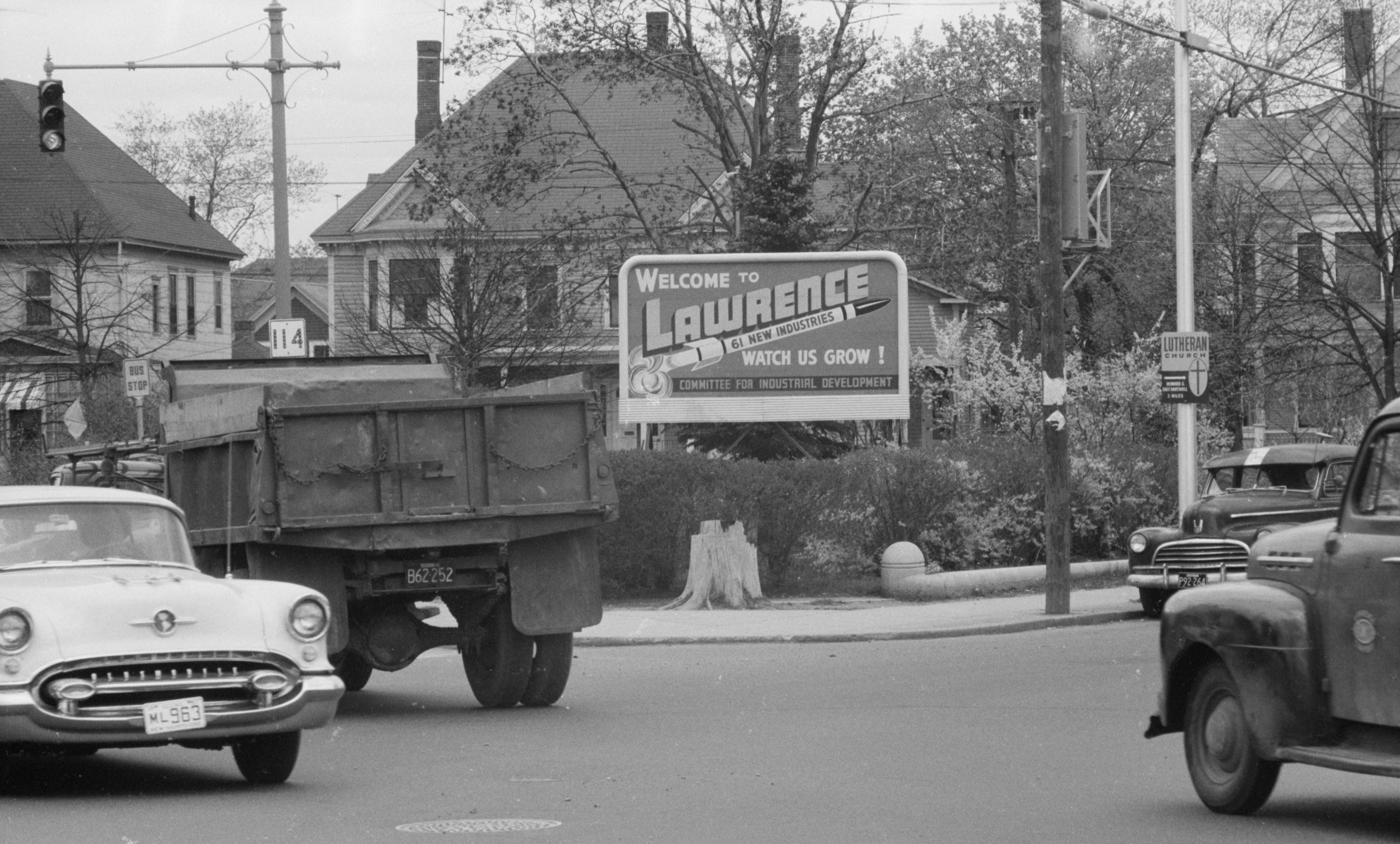
Lawrence road traffic in 1957

Lawrence was a great wool-processing center until that industry declined in the 1950s. The decline left Lawrence a struggling city. The population of Lawrence declined from over 80,000 residents in 1950 (and a high of 94,270 in 1920) to approximately 64,000 residents in 1980, the low point of Lawrence's population. Much of the population relocated to nearby Methuen.

==== Urban redevelopment and renewal ====
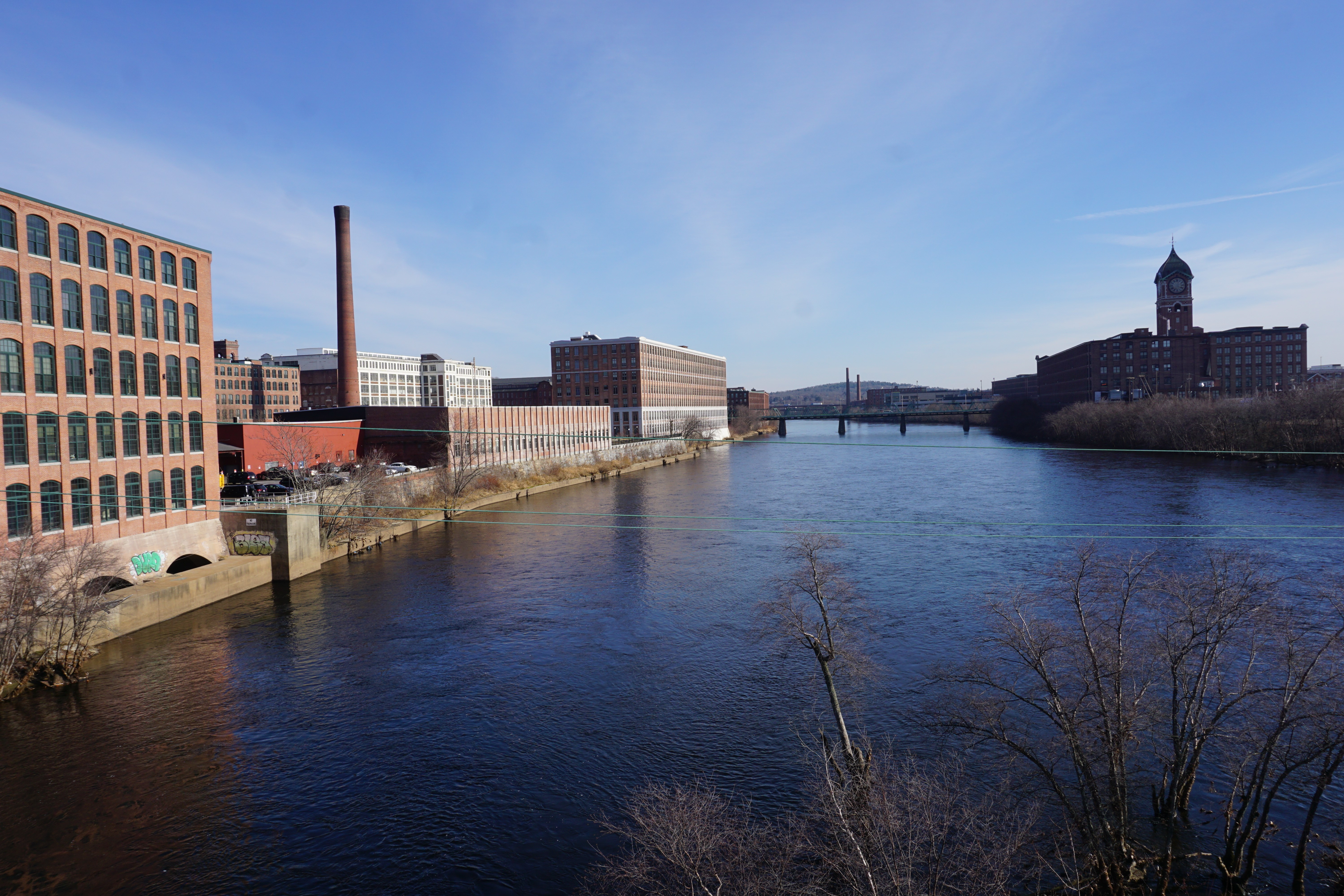
Merrimack River at Lawrence

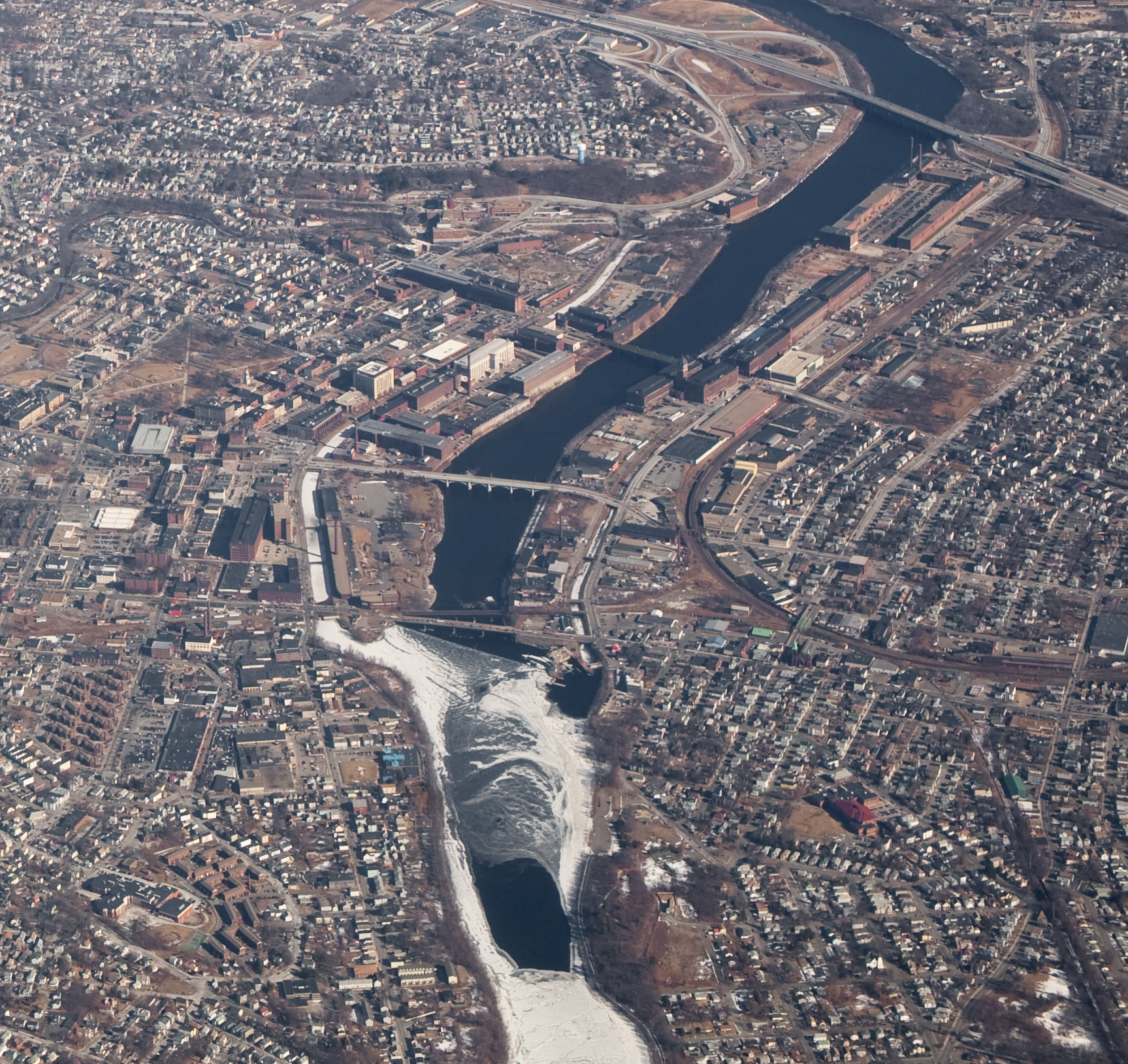
Aerial view of Merrimack River and Lawrence, 2010

Like other northeastern cities suffering from the effects of post-World War II industrial decline, Lawrence has often made efforts at revitalization, some of them controversial. The Lawrence Redevelopment Authority and city officials utilized eminent domain for a perceived public benefit, via a top-down approach, to revitalize the city throughout the 1960s. Known first as urban redevelopment, and then urban renewal, Lawrence's local government's actions towards vulnerable immigrant and poor communities, contained an undercurrent of gentrification which lies beneath the goals to revitalize Lawrence. There was a clash of differing ideals and perceptions of blight, growth, and what constituted a desirable community. Ultimately the discussion left out those members of the community who would be directly impacted by urban redevelopment.

Under the guise of urban renewal, large tracts of downtown Lawrence were razed in the 1970s, and replaced with parking lots and a three-story parking garage connected to a new Intown Mall intended to compete with newly constructed suburban malls. The historic Theater Row along Broadway was also razed, destroying ornate movie palaces of the 1920s and 1930s that entertained mill workers through the Great Depression and the Second World War. The city's main post office, an ornate Federalist-style building at the corner of Broadway and Essex Street, was razed. Most of the structures were replaced with one-story, steel-frame structures with large parking lots, housing such establishments as fast food restaurants and chain drug stores, fundamentally changing the character of the center of Lawrence.

Lawrence also attempted to increase its employment base by attracting industries unwanted in other communities, such as waste treatment facilities and incinerators. From 1980 until 1998, private corporations operated two trash incinerators in Lawrence. Activist residents successfully blocked the approval of a waste treatment center on the banks of the Merrimack River near the current site of Salvatore's Pizza on Merrimack Street.

Recently the focus of Lawrence's urban renewal has shifted to preservation rather than sprawl.

==== Events of the 1980s and 1990s ====
Immigrants from the Dominican Republic and migrants from Puerto Rico began arriving in Lawrence in significant numbers in the late 1960s, attracted by cheap housing and a history of tolerance toward immigrants. In 1984, tensions between remaining working-class whites and increasing numbers of Hispanic youth flared into a riot, centered at the intersection of Haverhill Street and Oxford Street, where several buildings were destroyed by Molotov cocktails and over 300 people were arrested.

Lawrence saw further setbacks during the recession of the early 1990s as a wave of arson plagued the city. Over 200 buildings were set alight in eighteen months in 1991–1992, many of them abandoned residences and industrial sites. The Malden Mills factory burned down on December 11, 1995. CEO Aaron Feuerstein decided to continue paying the salaries of all the now unemployed workers while the factory was being rebuilt.

==== Recent trends ====
A sharp reduction in violent crime starting in 2004 and massive private investment in former mill buildings along the Merrimack River, including the remaining section of the historic Wood Worsted Mill—to be converted into commercial, residential and education uses – have lent encouragement to boosters of the city. One of the final remaining mills in the city is Malden Mills. Lawrence's downtown has seen a resurgence of business activity as Hispanic-owned businesses have opened along Essex Street, the historic shopping street of Lawrence that remained largely shuttered since the 1970s. In June 2007, the city approved the sale of the Intown Mall, largely abandoned since the early 1990s recession, to Northern Essex Community College for the development of a medical sciences center, the construction of which commenced in 2012 when the InTown Mall was finally removed. A large multi-structure fire in January 2008 destroyed many wooden structures just south of downtown. A poor financial situation that has worsened with the recent global recession and has led to multiple municipal layoffs had Lawrence contemplating receivership. On February 9, 2019, in recognition of the role the town has played in the labor movement, Senator Elizabeth Warren officially announced in Lawrence her candidacy for President of the United States.

==== Gas explosion ====
On September 13, 2018, a series of gas explosions and fires broke out in as many as 40 homes in Lawrence, Andover, and North Andover. The disaster killed one resident and caused over 30,000 customers to evacuate their homes. A year after this first incident on September 27, 2019, there was another gas leak, causing people to evacuate their homes again.

=== Timeline ===
Timeline of Lawrence, Massachusetts
- 1845
  - Essex Company begins construction of the dam and canal on Merrimack River.
- 1846
  - Essex Company Machine Shop built.
  - Lawrence Street Church organized.
  - Church of the Immaculate Conception established.
- 1847
  - Town of Lawrence incorporated from Methuen and Andover; named after businessman Abbott Lawrence.
  - Lawrence Courier newspaper in publication.
  - Bellevue Cemetery established.
  - Franklin Library Association formed.
  - First Baptist Church, First Free Baptist Church, First Unitarian Society, Church of the Good Shepherd, and First Methodist Episcopal Church established
- 1848
  - Boston & Maine Railroad depot established in South Lawrence.
  - Lawrence Dam constructed across Merrimack River.
  - Bay State woollen mills begin operating.
  - St. Mary's Church organized.
- 1849
  - Manchester and Lawrence Railroad begins operating.
  - Lawrence Sentinel newspaper begins publication.
  - Central Church organized.
  - Atlantic Cotton Mills starts in business.
  - Lawrence Gas Company formed.
  - Lawrence Brass Band formed.
- 1850 – Population: 8,282.
- 1851 – Grace Episcopal Church built.
- 1853
  - The City of Lawrence incorporated as a municipal government.
  - Charles S. Storrow becomes the first city mayor.
  - Lawrence Duck Company in business.
  - Garden Street Methodist Episcopal Church organized as a congregation of the Methodist Episcopal Church.
- 1854
  - Additional part of Methuen annexed to the City of Lawrence.
  - Pacific Mills starts operating in business.
  - Lawrence Paper Company incorporated.
- 1855 – Pemberton Company in business.
- 1860
  - January – Pemberton Mill building collapse.
  - Population according to decennial United States Census: 17,639.
- 1861 – Massachusetts state militia called up by Governor in response to a proclamation by 16th President Abraham Lincoln of a state of rebellion in the South following firing on Fort Sumter in Charleston harbor in South Carolina Confederate forces on April 12. Sixth Regiment earliest to respond with men from Lawrence, Lowell, Methuen, Stoneham, Boston. Heads south by train and is attacked by mobs of Southern sympathizers in Baltimore along Pratt Street while being pulled through on horse cars and later marching between the President Street Station of the Philadelphia, Wilmington and Baltimore Railroad on the east of the harbor to the Camden Street Station of the Baltimore and Ohio Railroad on way to the national capital at Washington, D.C. on Friday, April 19. Four soldiers were killed and numerous wounded among Baltimorean civilians as city police and officials attempted to escort troops. Considered the "First Bloodshed of the Civil War".
- Second Baptist Church established.
- 1864 – Moseley Truss Bridge built.
- 1865
  - Eliot Congregational Church organized.
  - Arlington Mills in business.
  - Wright Manufacturing Co. formed.
- 1867 – Lawrence Flyer and Spindle Works in business.
- 1868
  - Lawrence Daily Eagle newspaper begins publication.
  - South Congregational Church and First Presbyterian Church established.
- 1871
  - Archibald Wheel Co. incorporated.
  - Parker Street Methodist Episcopal Church and St. Anne's Church organized.
- 1872 – Free Public Library established
- 1873 – St. Laurence's Church dedicated.
- 1876 – YMCA formed.
- 1877
  - Lawrence Bleachery established.
  - Tower Hill Congregational Church organized.
- 1878 – German Methodist Episcopal Church organized.
- 1879
  - Parts of Andover and North Andover annexed to Lawrence.
  - German Presbyterian Church organized.
  - Lawrence Bicycle Club formed.
- 1880
  - Globe Worsted Co. incorporated.
  - Bodwell Street M.E. Church organized.
- 1881
  - Lawrence Line Company incorporated.
  - Munroe Felt and Paper Company incorporated.
  - Merrimac Paper Company incorporated.
- 1882
  - L'Institute Canadien Francais founded.
  - Stanley Manufacturing Co. incorporated.
- 1884 – Emmons Loom Harness Company organized.
- 1887 – Lawrence Experiment Station established by the Massachusetts State Board of Health.
- 1888
  - Duck Bridge built.
  - Board of Trade organized.
- 1896 – High Service Water Tower built
- 1890
  - Public Library building constructed.
  - Evening Tribune newspaper begins publication.
  - July – Cyclone.
- 1899 – 20,899 people employed in manufacturing in Lawrence.
- 1905 – American Woolen Company builds Wood Mill.
- 1910 – Everett Mill constructed.
- 1911 – Lawrence bathhouse tragedy
- 1912 – Famous nationally known 1912 Lawrence Textile Strike occurs with strife and casualties. Later known as the "Bread and Roses Strike".
- 1918 - Central Bridge constructed.
- 1919 - 30,319 people employed in manufacturing in Lawrence.
- 1920 – Population: 94,270.
- 1927 – Stadium opens.
- 1931 – Boston & Maine Railroad depot active off Parker Street.
- 1934
  - Lawrence Municipal Airport established.
  - Walter A. Griffin becomes mayor.
- 1935 – Central Catholic High School opens.
- 1943 – Climatic Research Laboratory for United States Army in operation.
- 1966 – Daniel P. Kiley, Jr. becomes mayor.
- 1972 – John J. Buckley becomes mayor.
- 1975 – Paul Tsongas becomes Massachusetts's 5th congressional district representative.
- 1978
  - Immigrant City Archives at Lawrence History Center was established for local history and culture with exhibitions.
  - Lawrence P. LeFebre becomes mayor.
- 1985 – Greater Lawrence Habitat for Humanity organized.
- 1986 – Kevin J. Sullivan becomes mayor.
- 1991 – Northern Essex Community College active in Lawrence.
- 1995 – Malden Mills fire.
- 2001 – Michael J. Sullivan becomes mayor.
- 2004 – Notre Dame Cristo Rey High School opens.
  - First observance of Civil War Weekend at central Compeigne Common in October remembering local casualties then nationally famous and considered first "martyrs for the Union" of the noted Sixth Massachusetts volunteer state militia regiment in infamous Baltimore riot of 1861 (also known as the "Pratt Street Riots") as the "First Bloodshed of the Civil War" on April 19, 1861. Various military reenactment units and heritage groups including from the Baltimore Civil War Museum at the historic President Street Station participate in memorial ceremonies at the Soldiers Monument in Common and gravesites at historic Bellevue Cemetery, sponsored by the Lawrence Civil War Memorial Guard.
- 2005 – Lawrence (MBTA station) reopens for the Boston commuter train, subway and transit system.
- 2007 – Niki Tsongas becomes Massachusetts's 5th congressional district representative.
- 2010
  - Population: 76,377.
  - William Lantigua becomes mayor of Lawrence, first of Hispanic ancestry.
- 2012
  - School Superintendent convicted of fraud and embezzlement.
  - Centennial observed of infamous 1912 Lawrence Textile Strike, later known as "Bread and Roses" labor strife.
- 2021
  - Brian DePena who was later charged in a multimillion dollar COVID 19 fraud scheme, was elected mayor.

=== History of Lawrence immigrant communities ===
Lawrence has been aptly nicknamed the "Immigrant City". It has been home to numerous different immigrant communities, most of whom arrived during the great wave of immigration to America that ended in the 1920s.

==== Immigrant communities, 1845–1920 ====
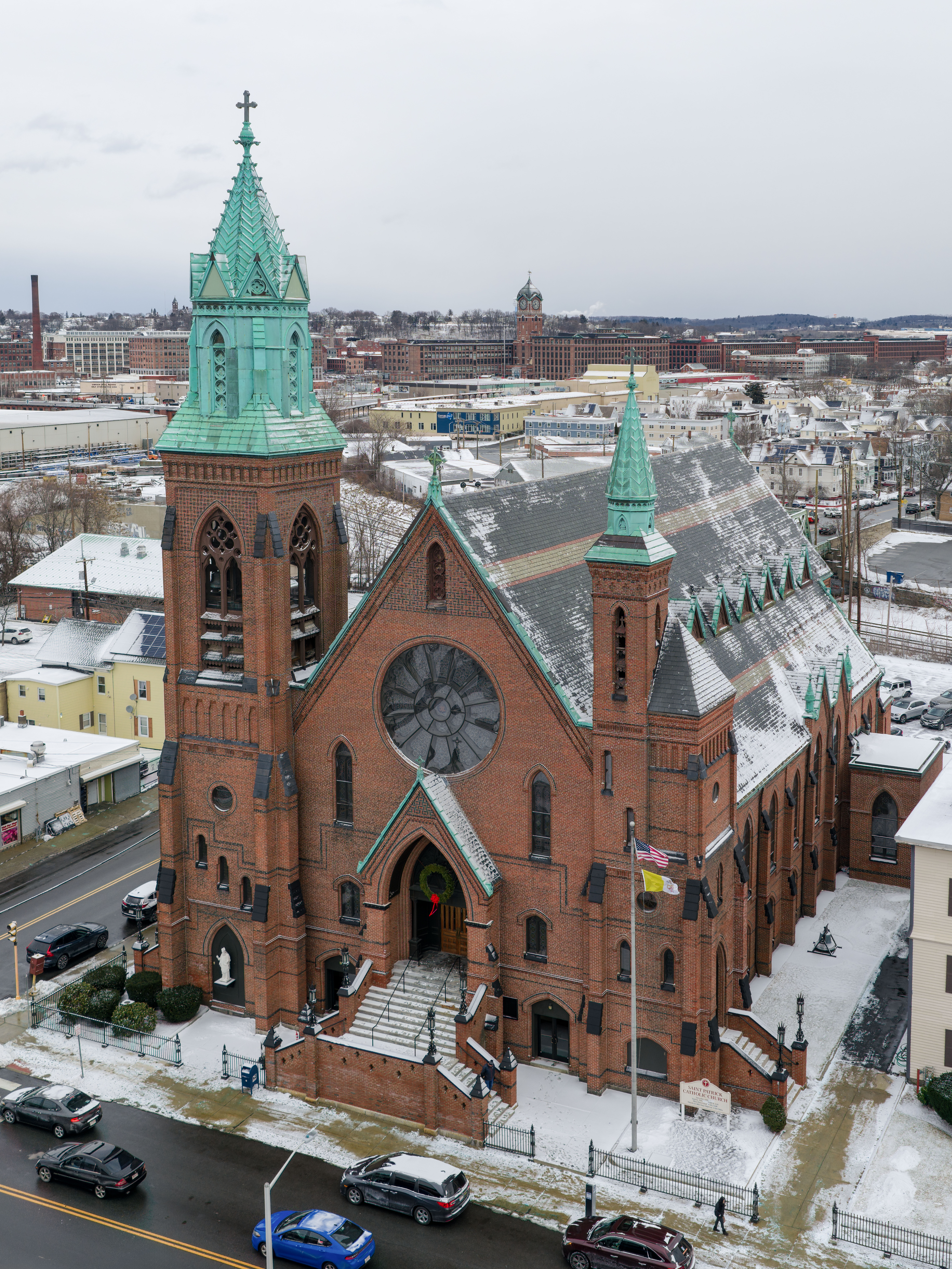
Saint Patrick Parish, built by Irish immigrants in the 1890s

Lawrence became home to large groups of immigrants from Europe, beginning with the Irish in 1845, Germans after the social upheaval in Germany in 1848, Swedes fleeing an overcrowded Sweden, and French Canadians seeking to escape hard northern farm life from the 1850s onward. A second wave began arriving after 1900, as part of the great mass of Italian, Eastern European, and Middle Eastern immigrants, including Jews from Russia, Poland, Lithuania, and neighboring regions. Immigration to the United States was severely curtailed in the 1920s with the Immigration Act of 1924 when foreign-born immigration to Lawrence virtually ceased for over 40 years.

In 1890, the foreign-born population of 28,577 was divided as follows, with the significant remainder of the population being children of foreign-born residents: 7,058 Irish; 6,999 French Canadians; 5,131 English; 2,465 German; 1,683 English Canadian. In 1920, toward the end of the first wave of immigration, most ethnic groups had numerous social clubs in the city. The Portuguese had 2; the English had 2; the Jews had 3; the Armenians, 5; the Lebanese and Syrians, 6; the Irish, 8; the Polish, 9; the French Canadians and Belgian-French, 14; the Lithuanians, 18; the Italians, 32; and the Germans, 47. However, the center of social life, even more than clubs or fraternal organizations, was churches. Lawrence is dotted with churches, many now closed, torn down, or converted into other uses. These churches signify, more than any other artifacts, the immigrant communities that once lived within walking distance of each church.

===== Germans =====
The first sizable German community arrived following the revolutions of 1848. However, a larger German community was formed after 1871, when industrial workers from Saxony were displaced by economic competition from new industrial areas like the Ruhr. The German community was characterized by numerous school clubs, shooting clubs, national and regional clubs, as well as men's choirs and mutual aid societies, many of which were clustered around the Turn Verein, a major social club on Park Street. Germans had a considerable number of churches in Lawrence, including Assumption of the Blessed Virgin Mary Parish (German Catholic) formed in 1887 on Lawrence Street, as well as several Protestant churches including The German Methodist Episcopal Church, Vine Street, organized in 1878; and the German Presbyterian, East Haverhill Street, organized in 1872, from which the Methodist church split in 1878.

===== Italians =====
Some Italian immigrants celebrated Mass in the basement chapel of the largely Irish St. Laurence O'Toole Parish Church, at the intersection of Essex Street and Union Street. When St. Laurence O'Toole Parish had collected sufficient funds to build a new church in 1905 at the nearby intersection of East Haverhill Street and Newbery Street, the Italian population formed Holy Rosary Parish. Immigrants from Lentini (a comune in the Sicilian province of Syracuse) and from the Sicilian province of Catania maintained a particular devotion to three Catholic martyrs, Saint Alfio, Saint Filadelfo and Saint Cirino, and in 1923 began celebrating a procession on their feast day. Although most of the participants live in neighboring towns, the Feast of Three Saints festival continues in Lawrence today. Many of the Italians who lived in the Newbury Street area had immigrated from Trecastagni, Viagrande, Acireale, and Nicolosi, Italy.

===== French Canadians =====
French Canadians were the second major immigrant group to settle in Lawrence. They erected their first church, St. Anne's, in 1872 at the corner of Haverhill and Franklin streets. Within decades, St. Anne's established a "missionary church", Sacred Heart on South Broadway, to serve the burgeoning Québécois community in South Lawrence. Later it would also establish the "missionary" parishes in Methuen: Our Lady of Mount Carmel and St. Theresa's (Notre-Dame du Mont Carmel et St-Thérèse). The French-Canadians arrived from various farming areas of Quebec where the old parishes were overpopulated: some people moved up north (Abitibi and Saguenay–Lac-Saint-Jean), while others moved to industrial towns to find work (Montreal, Quebec; but also in the United States). Others who integrated themselves into these French-Canadian communities were actually Acadians who had left the Canadian Maritimes of New Brunswick and Nova Scotia also in search of work.

===== Lebanese ("Syrians") =====
Lawrence residents frequently referred to their Arabic-speaking Middle Eastern community as "Syrian". Most so-called Syrians in Lawrence were from present-day Lebanon and were largely Maronite Christian. Lebanese and Syrians mostly settled in the neighborhoods of North Lawrence such as Tower Hill along with Prospect Hill. Lebanese immigrants organized St. Anthony's Maronite Church in 1903 on the corner of Lebanon Street and Lawrence Street, and St. Joseph's Melkite Greek-Catholic Church, as well as St. George's Antiochian Orthodox Church. Hundreds of thousands of Lebanese immigrants came to the United States during the Lebanese Civil War which took place from 1975 to 1990; some settled in various Massachusetts communities, including (but not limited to) Lawrence, Methuen, Boston, and Worcester.

===== Jews =====
Jewish merchants became increasingly numerous in Lawrence and specialized in dry goods and retail shops. The fanciest men's clothing store in Lawrence, Kap's, established in 1902 and closed in the early 1990s, was founded by Elias Kapelson, born in Lithuania. Jacob Sandler arrived in Lawrence in June 1891 (1906, his two brothers (Isaac and Sundel arrived), and 3 other brothers also arrived in the early 1900s. Jacob opened a shoe business at 434 Broadway and earned enough income to purchase the property at 256–258 Essex St, opening Sandler's Department Store; it later became Sandler's Luggage, which continued under his son Simon Sandler, and later his grandson Robert Sandler, until 1978. In the 1880s, the first Jewish arrivals established a community around Common, Valley, Concord, and Lowell streets. As of 1922, there were at least two noteworthy congregations, both on Concord Street: Congregation of Sons of Israel (Jewish), organized on October 3, 1894. Synagogue on Concord Street built in 1913; and Congregation of Anshea Sfard (Jewish), organized on April 6, 1900. The synagogue on Concord Street was built in the autumn of 1907. In the 1920s, the Jews of Lawrence began congregating further up Tower Hill, where they erected two synagogues on Lowell Street above Milton Street, as well as a Jewish Community Center on nearby Haverhill Street. All three institutions had closed their doors by 1990 as the remaining elderly members of the community died or moved away.

===== Polish =====
The Polish community of Lawrence was estimated to be only 600–800 persons in 1900. However, by 1905, the community had expanded sufficiently to fund the construction of the Holy Trinity Church at the corner of Avon and Trinity streets. Their numbers grew to 2,100 Poles in 1910. Like many of their immigrant brethren from other nations, most of the Poles were employed in woolen and worsted goods manufacturing.

===== Lithuanians =====
Lawrence had a sizable enough Lithuanian community to warrant the formation of both Lithuanian Catholic and Lithuanian National Catholic churches. St. Francis (Lithuanian Catholic Church) on Bradford Street was formed in 1903 by Rev. James T. O'Reilly of St. Mary's, in a building previously occupied by St. John's Episcopal Church. The church closed in 2002, merging with Holy Trinity (Polish) and SS. Peter and Paul (Portuguese). Sacred Heart Lithuanian National Catholic Church was established in 1917 and located on Garden Street until its closure and sale in 2001.

===== English =====
A sizable English community, composed mainly of unskilled laborers who arrived after 1880, sought work in the textile mills where they were given choice jobs by the Yankee overseers on account of their shared linguistic heritage and close cultural links.

===== Yankee farmers =====
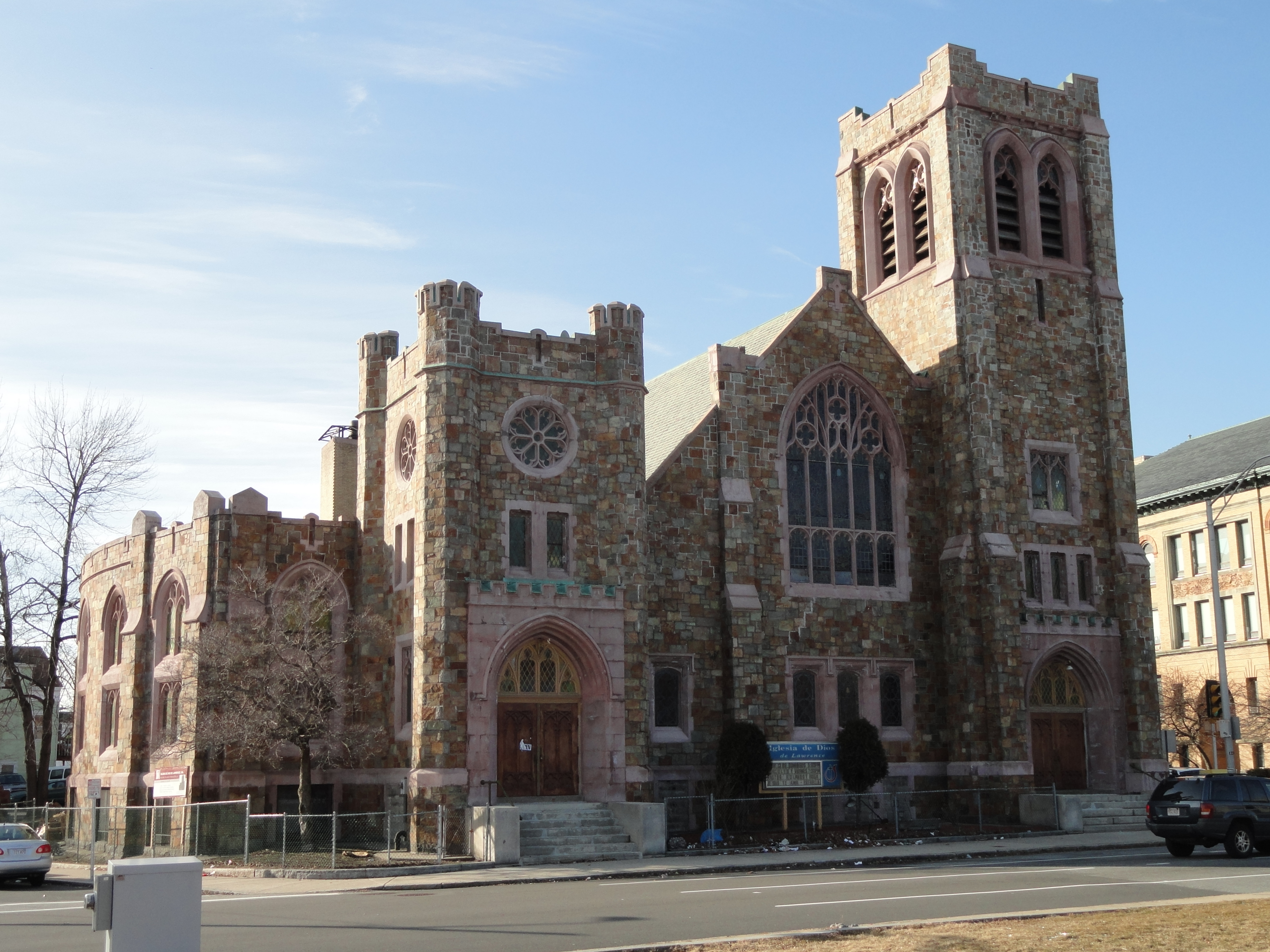
Lawrence Street Congregational Church

Not all immigrants to Lawrence were foreign-born or their children. Yankee farmers, unable to compete against the cheaper farmlands of the Midwest that had been linked to the East Coast by rail, settled in corners of Lawrence. Congregationalists were the second Protestant denomination to begin worship in Lawrence after the Episcopalians, with the formation of the Lawrence Street Congregational Church in 1847, and the first in South Lawrence, with the erection in 1852 of the first South Congregational Church on South Broadway, near the corner of Andover Street. Baptist churches included The First Baptist Church, one of the first churches in Lawrence, which was organized in the spring of 1947 and was known as Amesbury Street Baptist Church. Second Baptist was organized on September 6, 1860; its building was dedicated in 1874.

==== New immigrants, 1970 to present ====
Immigration of foreign-born workers to Lawrence largely ceased in 1921 with the passage of strict quotas against immigrants from the countries that had supplied the cheap, unskilled workers.

Although many quotas were lifted after the Second World War, foreign immigration to Lawrence only increased again in the early 1960s, with Hispanic immigrants from Cuba, Puerto Rico, the Dominican Republic, and other Latin American countries. Immigrants from Southeast Asia, particularly Vietnam, have also settled in Lawrence.

Indicative of immigration trends, several Catholic churches now conduct masses in two or more languages. St. Patrick's Church, a Catholic church in Lawrence and once an Irish bastion, has celebrated Spanish masses on Sundays since 1999. A mass in Vietnamese is also offered every other week. St. Mary's of the Assumption Parish is the largest Catholic parish in Lawrence by Mass attendance and number of registered parishioners. It has the largest multi-lingual congregation in the city and has been offering Spanish masses since the early 1990s.

Since the 1990s, increasing numbers of former Catholic churches, closed since the 1989s when their Irish or Italian congregations died out, have been bought by Hispanic evangelical churches.

The 2000 Census revealed the following population breakdown, illustrating the shift toward newer immigrant groups:

Dominican Republic, 22%; other Hispanic or Latino, 12%; Irish, 7%; Italian, 7%, French (except Basque), 5%; Black or African American, 5%; French Canadian, 5%; English, 3%; Arab, 2%; German, 2%; Lebanese, 2%; Central American, 1%; Polish, 1%; Portuguese, 1%; Guatemalan, 1%; Vietnamese, 1%; South American, 1%; Spanish, 1%; Cambodian, 1%; Scottish, 1%; Cuban, 1%; Scotch-Irish, 1%; Ecuadoran, 1%.

== Geography ==
According to the United States Census Bureau, the city has a total area of 7.4 square miles (19 km^{2}), of which 7.0 square miles (18 km^{2}) is land and 0.4 square miles (1.0 km^{2}) (6.07%) is water. Lawrence is on both sides of the Merrimack River, approximately 26 miles (42 km) upstream from the Atlantic Ocean. On the north side of the river, it is surrounded by Methuen. On the south side of the river, the town is bordered by North Andover to the east, and Andover to the south and southwest. Lawrence is approximately 20 miles (32 km) southwest of Newburyport, 30 miles (48 km) north-northwest of Boston and 27 miles (43 km) southeast of Manchester, New Hampshire.

Aside from the Merrimack River, other water features include the Spicket River, which flows into the Merrimack from Methuen, and the Shawsheen River, which forms the southeastern border of the city. Lawrence has two power canals that were formerly used to provide hydropower to the mills—one on the north bank of the river, the other on the south. Channeling water into these canals is the Great Stone Dam, which lies across the entire Merrimack and was, at the time of its construction in the 1840s, the largest dam in the world. The highest point in Lawrence is the top of Tower Hill in the northwest corner of the city, rising approximately 240 feet (73 m) above sea level. Other prominent hills include Prospect Hill, in the northeastern corner of the city, and Mount Vernon, along the southern edge of the city. Most industrial activity was concentrated in the flatlands along the rivers. Den Rock Park, a wooded conservation district on the southern edge of Lawrence that spans the Lawrence-Andover town line, provides recreation for nature lovers and rock climbers alike. There are also several small parks throughout town.

Lawrence is covered by the ZIP Codes 01840, 01841, 01842, and 01843.

=== Climate ===
Lawrence has a humid subtropical climate (Köppen climate classification Cfa), which is typical for eastern Massachusetts.

Climate data for Lawrence, Massachusetts (1991–2020 normals, extremes 1893–present)
Month	Jan	Feb	Mar	Apr	May	Jun	Jul	Aug	Sep	Oct	Nov	Dec	Year
Record high °F (°C)	70 (21)	76 (24)	88 (31)	93 (34)	98 (37)	101 (38)	106 (41)	101 (38)	100 (38)	89 (32)	81 (27)	75 (24)	106 (41)
Mean maximum °F (°C)	57.9 (14.4)	58.6 (14.8)	67.0 (19.4)	80.8 (27.1)	87.5 (30.8)	91.8 (33.2)	93.5 (34.2)	92.2 (33.4)	88.6 (31.4)	78.8 (26.0)	70.3 (21.3)	61.2 (16.2)	95.3 (35.2)
Mean daily maximum °F (°C)	35.1 (1.7)	37.3 (2.9)	44.9 (7.2)	57.2 (14.0)	68.0 (20.0)	77.3 (25.2)	82.9 (28.3)	81.4 (27.4)	74.2 (23.4)	61.8 (16.6)	50.8 (10.4)	40.6 (4.8)	59.3 (15.2)
Daily mean °F (°C)	27.3 (−2.6)	29.4 (−1.4)	37.3 (2.9)	48.6 (9.2)	58.9 (14.9)	68.2 (20.1)	73.8 (23.2)	72.6 (22.6)	65.3 (18.5)	53.1 (11.7)	42.8 (6.0)	33.4 (0.8)	50.9 (10.5)
Mean daily minimum °F (°C)	19.6 (−6.9)	21.4 (−5.9)	29.7 (−1.3)	40.0 (4.4)	49.8 (9.9)	59.2 (15.1)	64.8 (18.2)	63.8 (17.7)	56.3 (13.5)	44.4 (6.9)	34.8 (1.6)	26.2 (−3.2)	42.5 (5.8)
Mean minimum °F (°C)	0.0 (−17.8)	3.4 (−15.9)	10.6 (−11.9)	26.9 (−2.8)	37.0 (2.8)	46.5 (8.1)	54.2 (12.3)	52.4 (11.3)	40.7 (4.8)	30.1 (−1.1)	19.6 (−6.9)	8.6 (−13.0)	−2.9 (−19.4)
Record low °F (°C)	−23 (−31)	−25 (−32)	−6 (−21)	9 (−13)	16 (−9)	35 (2)	43 (6)	37 (3)	28 (−2)	19 (−7)	4 (−16)	−20 (−29)	−25 (−32)
Average precipitation inches (mm)	4.17 (106)	3.77 (96)	4.68 (119)	4.15 (105)	3.81 (97)	4.11 (104)	3.66 (93)	3.72 (94)	3.90 (99)	4.69 (119)	3.85 (98)	4.74 (120)	49.25 (1,250)
Average precipitation days (≥ 0.01 in)	11.3	8.7	9.6	9.9	11.9	11.1	9.2	8.9	8.6	9.9	9.6	10.0	118.7
Source 1: NOAA
Source 2: National Weather Service

== Demographics ==
Historical population
Year	Pop.	±%
1850	8,282	—
1860	17,639	+113.0%
1870	28,921	+64.0%
1880	39,151	+35.4%
1890	44,654	+14.1%
1900	62,559	+40.1%
1910	85,892	+37.3%
1920	94,270	+9.8%
1930	85,068	−9.8%
1940	84,323	−0.9%
1950	80,536	−4.5%
1960	70,933	−11.9%
1970	66,915	−5.7%
1980	63,175	−5.6%
1990	70,207	+11.1%
2000	72,043	+2.6%
2010	76,377	+6.0%
2020	89,143	+16.7%
2024	89,332	+0.2%
U.S. Decennial Census

=== Racial and ethnic composition ===
Lawrence, Massachusetts – Racial and ethnic composition Note: the US Census treats Hispanic/Latino as an ethnic category. This table excludes Latinos from the racial categories and assigns them to a separate category. Hispanics/Latinos may be of any race.
Race / Ethnicity (NH = Non-Hispanic)	Pop 2000	Pop 2010	Pop 2020	% 2000	% 2010	% 2020
White alone (NH)	24,569	15,637	10,984	34.10%	20.47%	12.32%
Black or African American alone (NH)	1,412	1,722	2,088	1.96%	2.25%	2.34%
Native American or Alaska Native alone (NH)	204	130	96	0.28%	0.17%	0.11%
Asian alone (NH)	1,832	1,756	1,547	2.54%	2.30%	1.74%
Pacific Islander alone (NH)	18	2	9	0.02%	0.00%	0.01%
Some Other Race alone (NH)	157	253	660	0.22%	0.33%	0.74%
Mixed Race or Multi-Racial (NH)	832	514	857	1.15%	0.67%	0.96%
Hispanic or Latino (any race)	43,019	56,363	72,902	59.71%	73.80%	81.78%
Total	72,043	76,377	89,143	100.00%	100.00%	100.00%

=== 2020 census ===
As of the 2020 census, Lawrence had a population of 89,143. The median age was 33.0 years. 26.2% of residents were under the age of 18 and 10.9% of residents were 65 years of age or older. For every 100 females there were 93.7 males, and for every 100 females age 18 and over there were 90.3 males age 18 and over.

Hispanic or Latino residents comprised 81.7% of the population, 12.3% were non-Hispanic White, 2.3% were non-Hispanic Black, 1.7% were Asian, 0.1% were Native American or Pacific Islander, and 1.9% of residents identified as mixed or other races.

100.0% of residents lived in urban areas, while 0.0% lived in rural areas.

There were 28,955 households in Lawrence, of which 42.0% had children under the age of 18 living in them. Of all households, 31.3% were married-couple households, 20.5% were households with a male householder and no spouse or partner present, and 38.9% were households with a female householder and no spouse or partner present. About 24.0% of all households were made up of individuals and 9.3% had someone living alone who was 65 years of age or older.

There were 30,008 housing units, of which 3.5% were vacant. The homeowner vacancy rate was 0.6% and the rental vacancy rate was 2.6%.

=== 2010 census ===
According to the U.S. Census Bureau 2010 Census, the city's population is 76,377, the population density is 10,973.7 per square mile (4237/km^{2}), and there are 27,137 households (25,181 occupied).

=== 2000 census ===
As of the census of 2000, there were 72,043 people, 24,463 households, and 16,903 families residing in the city. The population density was 10,351.4 inhabitants per square mile (3,996.7/km^{2}). There were 25,601 housing units at an average density of 3,678.4 per square mile (1,420.2/km^{2}). The racial makeup of the city was 48.64% White (U.S. Average: 72.4%), 4.88% African American (U.S. Average: 12.3%), 2.65% Asian (U.S. Average: 3.6%), 0.81% Native American (U.S. Average: 0.1%), 0.10% Pacific Islander (U.S. Average: 0.1%), 36.67% from other races (U.S. Average: 5.5%), 6.25% from two or more races (U.S. Average: 2.4%).

There were 24,463 households where the average household size was 2.90 and the average family size was 3.46.

- 41.4% had children under the age of 18 living with them. (U.S. Average: 32.8%)
- 36.6% were married couples living together. (U.S. Average: 51.7%)
- 25.7% had a female householder with no husband present. (U.S. Average: 12.2%)
- 30.9% were non-families. (U.S. Average: 31.9%)
- 25.5% of all households were made up of individuals. (U.S. Average: 25.8%)
- 10.0% had someone living alone who was 65 years of age or older. (U.S. Average: 9.2%)

In the city, the population had a median age was 30.0 years (U.S. Average: 35.3):

- 32.0% under the age of 18
- 11.1% from 18 to 24
- 30.3% from 25 to 44
- 16.7% from 45 to 64
- 9.8% were 65 years of age or older.

For every 100 females, there were 91.6 males. For every 100 females age 18 and over, there were 86.8 males.

The median income for a household in the city was $25,983 (U.S. Average: $41,994), and the median income for a family was $29,809 (U.S. Average: $50,046). Males had a median income of $27,772 versus $23,137 for females. The per capita income for the city was $11,360. About 21.2% of families (U.S. Average: 9.2%) and 34.3% (U.S. Average: 12.4%) of the population were below the poverty line, including 31.7% of those under age 18 and 20.1% of those age 65 or over.

=== Language ===
The former Mayor of Lawrence, Daniel Rivera, said the city was "approximately 75% Spanish" following an incident where Spanish and other non-English speaking callers were allegedly hung up on by a 911 operator.

== Economy ==
New Balance has a shoe manufacturing plant in Lawrence, one of five plants operating in the US.

Charm Sciences, which manufactures test kits and systems for antibiotics, veterinary drugs, mycotoxins, pesticides, alkaline phosphatase, pathogens, end-product microbial assessment, allergen control, and ATP hygiene, has a laboratory in Lawrence.

== Arts and culture ==
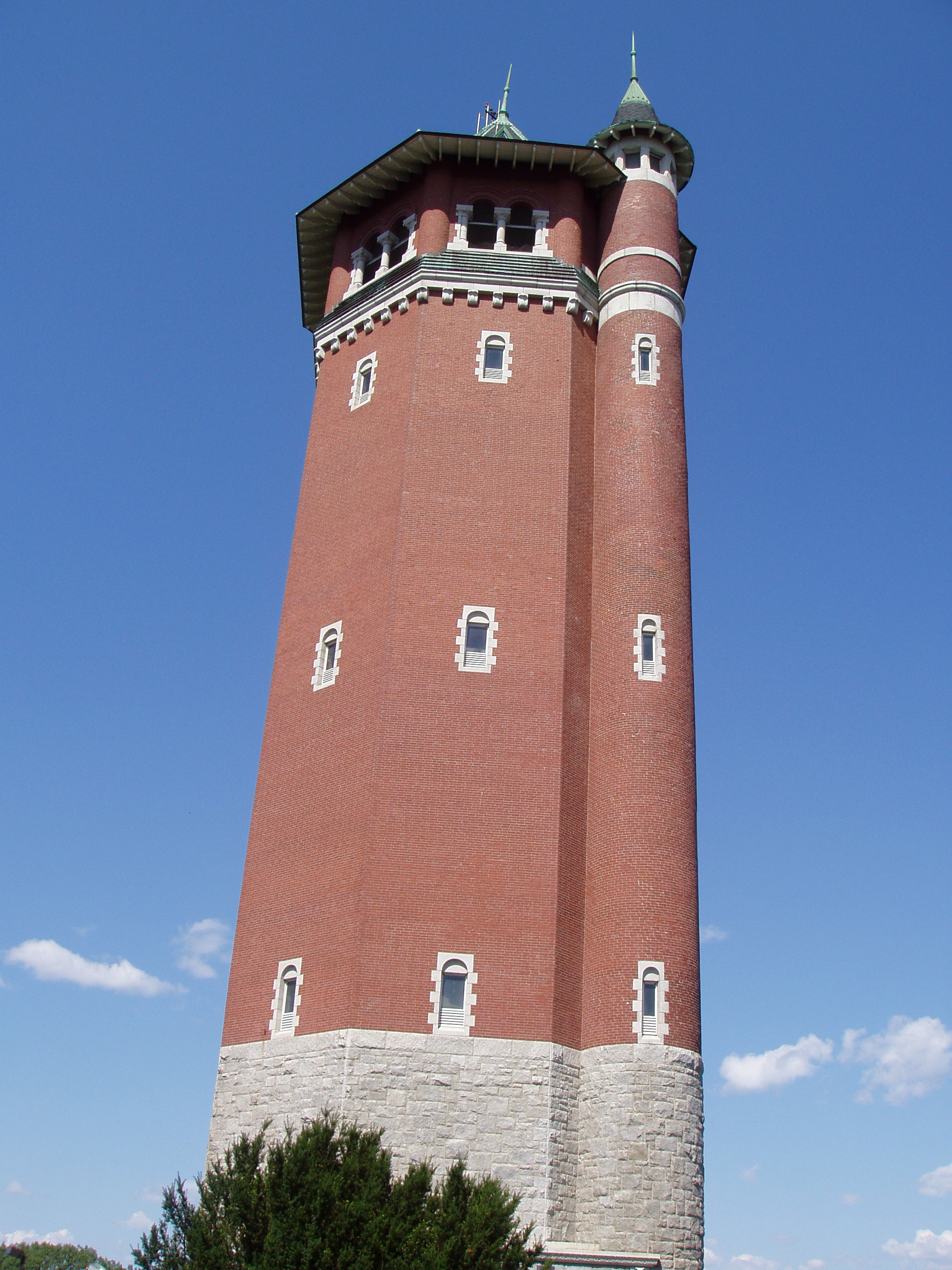
High Service Water Tower (1895), also called Tower Hill Water Tower

=== Points of interest ===
- Bellevue Cemetery
- Campagnone Common
- Essex Art Center
- Great Stone Dam
- High Service Water Tower and Reservoir
- Lawrence Community Works
- Lawrence Experiment Station
- Lawrence Heritage State Park
- Lawrence History Center
- Old Public Library
- Sacred Heart Parish Complex
- Saint Alfio Society (Feast of the Three Saints) - An Italian feast that is held every Labor Day weekend along Common Street
- Semana Hispana (Hispanic Week)
- Veterans Memorial Stadium

=== Library ===
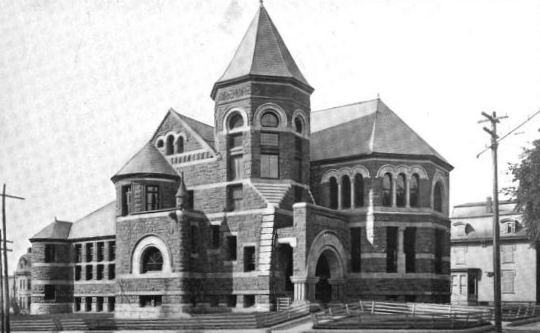
Lawrence’s Old Public Library, 1899

The Lawrence Public Library was established in 1872. In fiscal year 2008, the city of Lawrence spent 0.55% ($1,155,597) of its budget on its public library—approximately $16 per person, per year ($19.60 adjusted for inflation in 2021).

== Government ==
Lawrence is one of Essex County's two county seats, along with Salem. As such, it is home to a juvenile, district and superior court, as well as a regional office of the Massachusetts Registry of Motor Vehicles.

=== Local ===
Lawrence has a "strong mayor", which is one directly elected by the voters to be the city's executive. The city council is elected partly at large and partly from districts or wards of the city. Party primaries are prohibited. Lawrence has an established City Charter and a mayor-council government. There are nine city councilors and six school committee members; most are elected by district; three city council members are elected at large. There are six districts in Lawrence and all elections are non-partisan. The Mayor serves as the seventh member and chair of the school committee. The city council chooses one of its members as president who serves as chair of the council. The city of Lawrence also elects three members to the Greater Lawrence Technical School Committee these members are elected at-large. City Council and Mayoral terms of office begin in January.

The current mayor is Brian A. De Peña. The current members of the City Council are:

- Marc LaPlante, President (District F)
- Estela Reyes, Vice-President (District B)
- Richard Russell, Councilor at large
- Celina Reyes, Councilor at large
- Ana Levy, Councilor at large
- Maria De La Cruz, District A
- Gregory Delrosario, District C
- Jeovanny A. Rodriguez, District D
- Stephany Infante, District E

The Lawrence School Committee has six elected district members in which the Mayor serves as the appointed seventh member and chair of the school committee.

- Brian A DePeña, Chair (Mayor)
- Jonathan Guzmán, Vice-Chair (Committeeman of District F)
- Threicy Soto, Committeewoman of District A
- Santiago Reyes-Cruz, Committeeman of District B
- Lenin Roa, Committeeman of District C
- Joshua Alba, Committeeman of District D
- Patricia Mariano, Committeewoman of District E

=== State government ===
- Estela Reyes, (D-4th Essex district)
- Francisco E. Paulino, (D-16th Essex district)
- Frank A. Moran, (D-17th Essex district)
- Pavel Payano, (D-1st Essex district)
- Eileen Duff (D), Governor's Councilor

=== Federal government ===
- Lori Trahan, (D-United States House of Representatives, Massachusetts District 3)
- Elizabeth Warren (D), Ed Markey (D), United States Senate

Presidential election results
Year	Democratic	Republican
2024	57.2% 12,073	40.2% 8,477
2020	73.3% 17,023	25.0% 5,803
2016	81.8% 19,852	14.6% 3,535
2012	83.2% 18,278	15.8% 3,462
2008	79.8% 15,632	18.5% 3,624
2004	70.2% 11,547	29.1% 4,796
2000	69.2% 10,048	25.5% 3,700
1996	68.2% 8,615	22.2% 2,804
1992	47.7% 7,698	31.5% 5,079
1988	52.0% 9,255	46.4% 8,265
1984	52.4% 10,986	47.1% 9,877
1980	53.4% 12,145	35.3% 8,020

== Education ==
=== Public schools ===
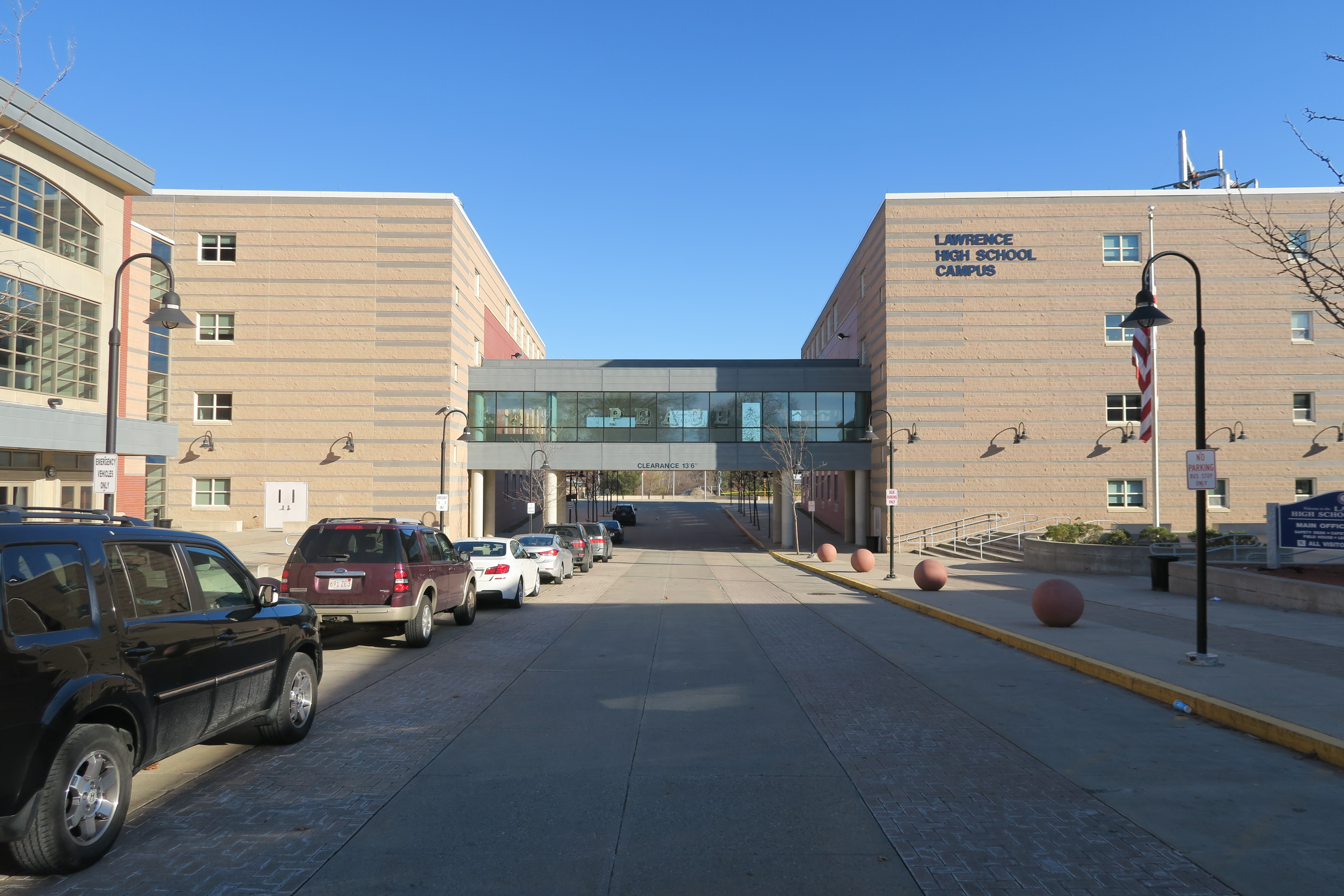
Lawrence High School

The city has a public school system managed by Lawrence Public Schools. In November 2011, the Lawrence Public Schools was placed into state receivership by the Massachusetts Board of Elementary & Secondary Education.

==== High schools ====
- Lawrence High School (of the school district)
- High School Learning Center
- Greater Lawrence Technical School – a regional technical high school serving the four communities of Andover, Lawrence, Methuen and North Andover

==== Charter schools ====
- Lawrence Family Development Charter School
- Community Day Charter Public School

=== Private schools ===
==== Elementary schools ====
- Bellesini Academy
- Esperanza Academy
- Lawrence Catholic Academy

==== High schools ====
- Central Catholic High School
- Notre Dame Cristo Rey High School

=== Higher education ===
==== Public ====
- Northern Essex Community College

==== Private ====
- Cambridge College

== Media ==
Lawrence's main newspaper is The Eagle-Tribune, one of the major newspapers for the Merrimack Valley that was founded in Lawrence in 1890 but later moved its facilities to the town of North Andover on Route 114. Lawrence is home to Rumbo (a bilingual English/Spanish paper). The city has three AM stations, WNNW/800, WCAP/980, and WLLH/1400 (which is also dually licensed to Lowell, Massachusetts with a synchronous transmitter in that city); along with one FM station: WEEI-FM/93.7. WMFP is the only television station operating out of the city, and the city is considered part of the Boston television market.

== Infrastructure ==
=== Transportation ===
Lawrence lies along Interstate 495, which passes through the eastern portion of the city. There are three exits entirely within the city, though two more provide access from just outside the city limits. The town is also served by Route 28 passing from south to north through the city, and Route 110, which passes from east to west through the northern half of the city. Route 114 also has its western terminus at Route 28 at the Merrimack River. Lawrence is the site of four road crossings and a railroad crossing over the Merrimack, including the O'Leary Bridge (Route 28), a railroad bridge, the Casey Bridge (bringing Parker Street and access to Route 114 and the Lawrence MBTA station to the north shore), the Duck Bridge (which brings Union Street across the river), and the double-decked O'Reilly Bridge, bringing I-495 across the river.

Lawrence is the western hub of the Merrimack Valley Regional Transit Authority's bus service. It is also home to the Senator Patricia McGovern Transportation Center, home to regional bus service, and the Lawrence stop along the Haverhill/Reading Line of the MBTA Commuter Rail system, providing service from Haverhill to Boston's North Station. Amtrak's Downeaster service to Maine is available eight miles to the northeast in Haverhill. Lawrence Municipal Airport provides small plane service, though it is actually in neighboring North Andover. Lawrence is approximately equidistant from Manchester-Boston Regional Airport and Logan International Airport. Plans to revitalize the Manchester and Lawrence branch to the north, leading to Manchester, New Hampshire, will allow the MBTA to operate rail service up to Manchester from Lawrence, in conjunction with Pan Am Freights.

=== Healthcare ===
Lawrence General Hospital, founded in 1895, is the city's main hospital, providing service to much of the area south of the city. Other nearby hospitals are in Methuen, Haverhill, and Lowell. The city also is served by the Greater Lawrence Family Health Center. Guardian Ambulance was established in 1990 and incorporated in 1991 by local EMTs to serve the city during a downturn in the economy at that time. The station moved from the Tower Hill section to its current location on Marston Street in 1993.

=== Public safety ===
Lawrence has its own police and fire departments, and Lawrence General Hospital provides ambulance services to the city. The city is also covered by the Andover barracks of Troop A of the Massachusetts State Police, which serves much of the western Merrimack Valley and several towns just south of Andover.

Lawrence Correctional Alternative Center is a regional alternative jail for low-risk offenders.

=== Utilities ===
The city does not own public works and trash pickup departments.

== See also ==
- 1912 Lawrence textile strike
- American Automobile and Power Company
- American Woolen Company
- Bread and Roses
- Malden Mills
- Murder of Melissa Ann Tremblay
- Noack Organ Company
- Pemberton Mill
- List of mill towns in Massachusetts

== Bibliography ==
- Jeremiah Spofford (1860), "Lawrence", Historical and Statistical Gazetteer of Massachusetts (2nd ed.), Haverhill: E.G. Frothingham
- J. F. C. Hayes (1868), History of the city of Lawrence, Lawrence, Mass: E.D. Green, OCLC 3700952, OL 6905479M
- "Lawrence Business Directory". Merrimack River Directory, for 1872 & 1873, containing a complete business directory of Concord, Manchester, Nashua, Lowell, Lawrence, Haverhill, Amesbury and Salisbury, and Newburyport. Boston: Greenough, Jones. 1872.
- H. A. Wadsworth (1880), History of Lawrence, Massachusetts, Lawrence, Mass.: Printed by Hammon Reed, Lawrence Eagle Steam Job Print. Office, OCLC 7185272, OL 6905480M
- Lawrence Directory: 1883. Boston: Sampson, Davenport & Co. 1883.
- "City of Lawrence", Industries of Massachusetts: historical and descriptive review of Lynn, Lowell, Lawrence, Haverhill, Salem, Beverly, Peabody, Danvers, Gloucester, Newburyport, and Amesbury, and their leading manufacturers and merchants, New York: International Pub. Co., 1886, OCLC 19803267
- D. Hamilton Hurd (1888), "Lawrence", History of Essex County, Massachusetts, Philadelphia: J. W. Lewis & Co., OCLC 3106590
- Lawrence Gazetteer, containing a record of the important events in Lawrence and vicinity from 1845 to 1894, Charles G. Merrill, 1894, OCLC 8678542, OL 13523902M
- Chisholm, Hugh, ed. (1910). "Lawrence (Massachusetts)" . Encyclopædia Britannica. Vol. 16 (11th ed.). Cambridge University Press. p. 309.
- Maurice B. Dorgan (1918), Lawrence yesterday and today: 1845–1918, Dick & Trumpold, OCLC 10625548, OL 6619506M
- Benjamin F. Arrington (1922), "City of Lawrence", Municipal history of Essex County in Massachusetts, New York: Lewis historical publishing company, OCLC 1619460
- Maurice B. Dorgan, History of Lawrence, Massachusetts: With War Records. Lawrence, MA: Maurice B. Dorgan, 1924.
- "Ethnic tensions in Lawrence" (Archive). WGBH-TV. March 28, 1991.
- Peter A. Ford (2000). "'Father of the Whole Enterprise': Charles S. Storrow and the Making of Lawrence, Massachusetts, 1845–1860". Massachusetts Historical Review. 2.
- Urban redevelopment of Lawrence, MA a retrospective case study of the Plains Neighborhood by Pernice, Nicolas M., M.S. 2011.
- Barber, Llana. Latino City: Immigration and Urban Crisis in Lawrence, Massachusetts, 1945–2000 (U of North Carolina Press, 2017), xiv, 325 pp.
