= Brian DePeña =

American politician

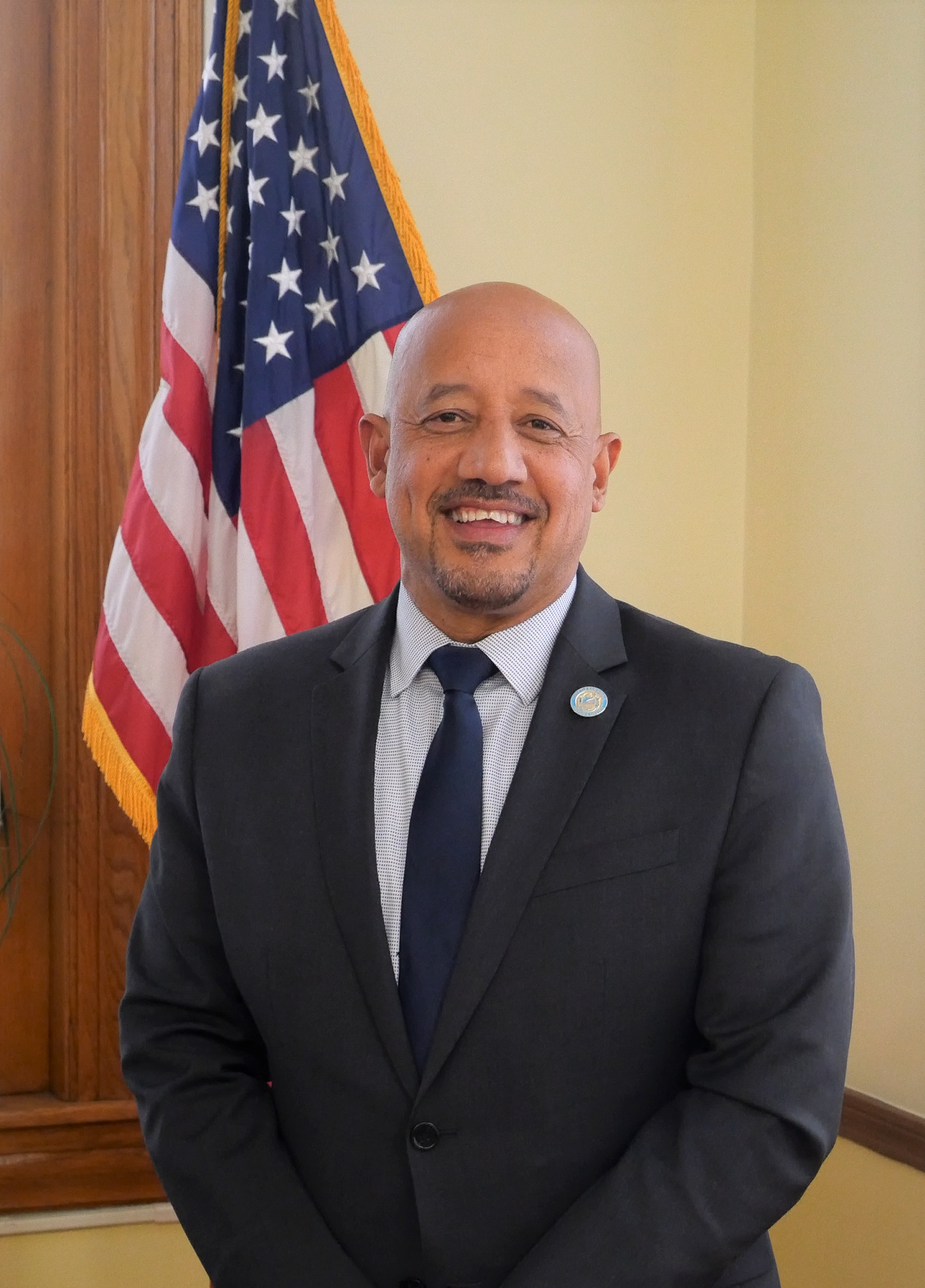

60th Mayor of Lawrence, Massachusetts
- Incumbent
- Assumed office November 12, 2021
- Preceded by: Kendrys Vasquez (Acting)

Member of the Lawrence, Massachusetts City Council At-Large
- In office January 2016 – November 12, 2021
- Preceded by: Roger Twomey
- Succeeded by: Celina Reyes

Personal details
- Party: Democratic

Brian A. DePeña is an American politician and the current mayor of Lawrence, Massachusetts. In 2021, he defeated acting mayor Kendrys Vasquez in the November general election.

== Career ==
DePeña was a Lawrence City Councilor from January 2016 until November 2021, when he was elected Mayor of Lawrence.

He owned and operated Tenares Tire Services Inc, a tire sales and repair shop located in Lawrence, Massachusetts.

== Controversy ==
He was arrested on August 14, 2026, facing federal fraud charges relating to COVID-19 funds.

In September 2026, DePeña was indicted on 14 counts of wiretapping and one count of witness intimidation by Massachusetts District Court.

== Electoral results ==
2021 Lawrence Mayoral election
Candidates	General Election	
Candidates	Votes	%
Brian DePeña	6,172	52.8
Kendrys Vasquez	5,423	46.4
Write-ins	43	0.4
Blanks	56	0.5
Total	11,694	100%

Political offices
Preceded by Kendrys Vasquez	Mayor of Lawrence; November 12, 2021	Succeeded by Incumbent
