= Nelson Motor Truck Company =

Defunct American motor vehicle manufacturer

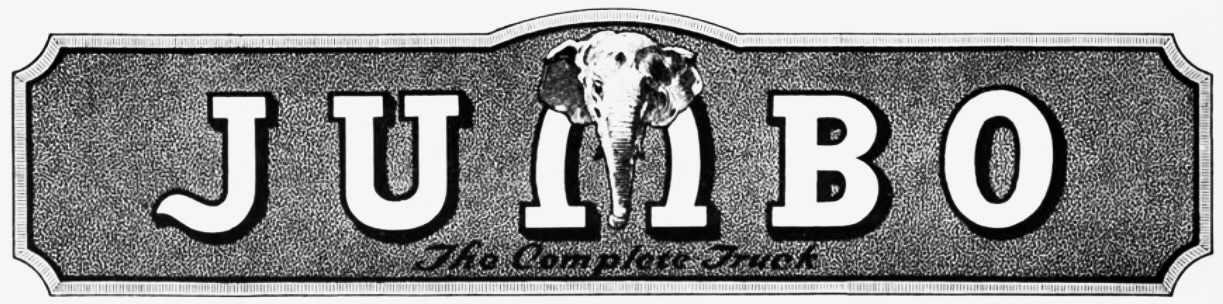
- Type: Truck Company
- Industry: Manufacturing
- Founded: 1918; 108 years ago
- Founder: H. B. Nelson
- Defunct: 1924; 102 years ago
- Headquarters: Saginaw, Michigan, US
- Products: Trucks

The Nelson Motor Truck Company of Saginaw, Michigan, was a truck manufacturer.

== History ==
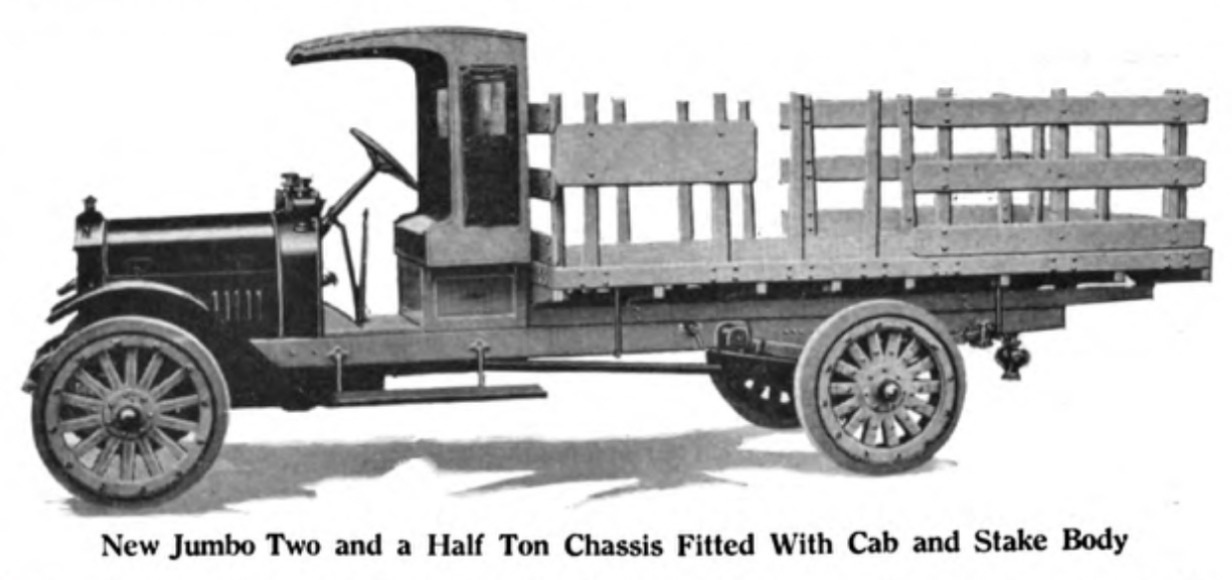
Jumbo 2,5 to (1918)

The company was founded in 1918. A two-and-a-half-ton truck, under the trade name “Jumbo,” is to be produced by the Nelson Motor Truck Co. in Saginaw, Michigan. The trademark was the circus elephant “Jumbo.” An elephant shown from the front also formed the letter “M” in the name Jumbo on the radiator grille logo. This factory was previously used by the Argo Electric Vehicle Co., which produced the Yale there from 1916 to April 1918. With minor changes and the installation of some new machines and equipment, the plant was suitable for producing Jumbo trucks. The company is starting the truck factory with a capital of $300,000. The capital is held by the Nelson brothers, who used to work in the manufacture of stationary engines and pumpjacks. To make the planned sale price of just $2,250 possible, only one size, the 2,5-ton model, will be produced. The price is made possible by using many purchased components. This type of assembled truck was common in 1918. The plan is to build just one truck in one size, a 2,5-ton model. This sale price covers the chassis with driver’s seat, fenders, lamps, tools, and solid rubber tires. According to the manufacturers, development and testing already started in 1916, so the new factory can start in April with a well-developed vehicle. The four-cylinder engine from Buda , type HU, has 5,114 cc. The wheelbase was 3,658 mm. In the year 1919, the production number is supposed to be 1,200 trucks. The company, which originally planned to sell its trucks only in the domestic market, entered into an alliance in 1919 with John Simmons Co., 110 Centre Street, New York City. This wholesaler, with more than 40 years of experience, also wanted to sell the trucks in Europe, Asia, Australia and South America. This required a production expansion to a 1,5-ton and a 3,5-ton truck.

== Production models ==
- Model 25
- Model 15
- Model 35
