= Colt Runabout =

Defunct American motor vehicle manufacturer

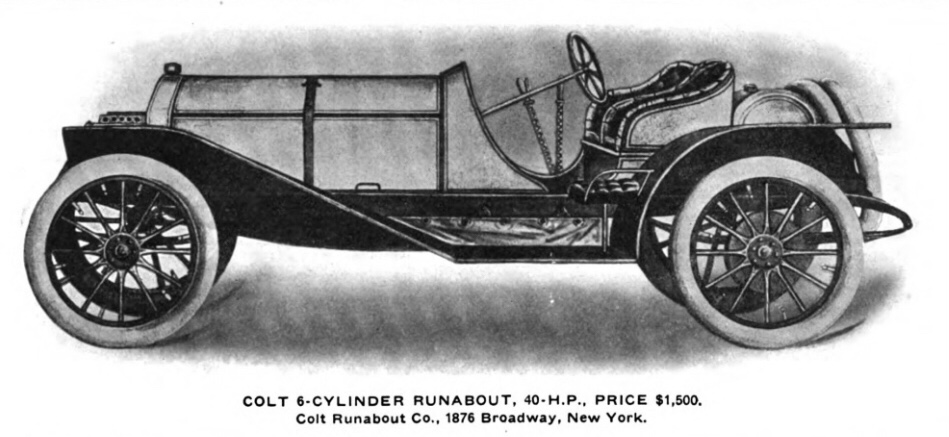

Overview
- Manufacturer: Colt Runabout Company
- Production: 1907

Body and chassis
- Body style: Runabout

Powertrain
- Engine: Six-cylinder gasoline
- Transmission: 3-speed manual

Dimensions
- Wheelbase: 105 in (2,667 mm)

The Colt Runabout was an American Brass-era automobile built in Yonkers, New York, in 1907 by William Mason Turner.

It was a two-seater, with a long hood and short tail (where a pair of spare tires were mounted), characteristic of the period, and weighing in at 1,800 lb (820 kg). It was priced at US$1500, compared to US$650 for the high-volume Oldsmobile Runabout and the two-seat Ford Model C "doctor's car" at $850, but below the $1600 of the Oakland 40, and well below even American's lowest-priced model, which was $4250 (its highest was $5250).

The Runabout's 477-in^{3} (7819 cc) (4.5×5.0-inch, 114×127 mm) six-cylinder produced 40 hp (30 kW), and Colt claimed the car could reach 60 mph (97 km/h).

== Sources ==
- Clymer, Floyd. Treasury of Early American Automobiles, 1877-1925. New York, Bonanza Books, 1950.
