= Yale (automobile) =

Automobile by the Kirk Manufacturing Company

Kirk Manufacturing Company
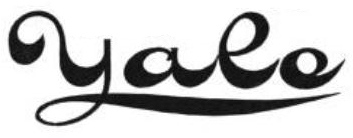
- Company type: Automobile Manufacturing
- Industry: Automotive
- Genre: Touring cars
- Headquarters: Toledo, Ohio, United States
- Area served: United States
- Products: Vehicles; Automotive parts

The Yale was an automobile by the Kirk Manufacturing Company, a manufacturer of Brass Era automobiles in Toledo, Ohio, from 1901 to 1905.

== History ==
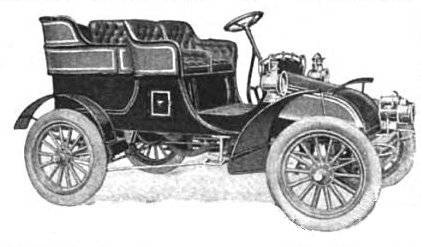
Yale Model A (1903)

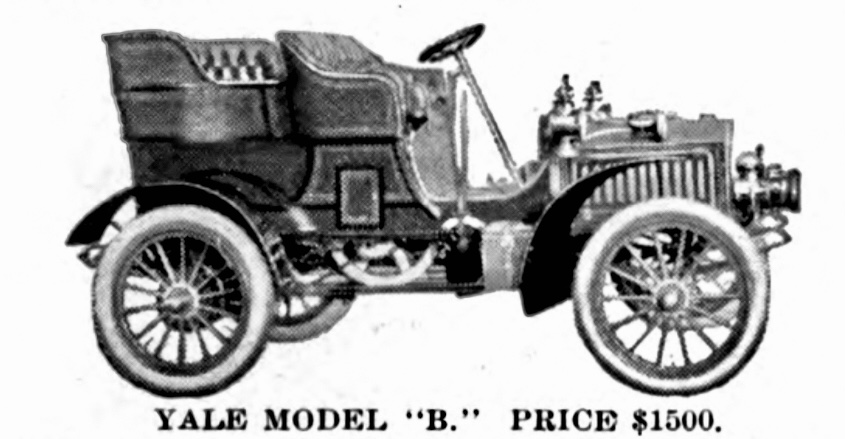
Yale Model B (1904)

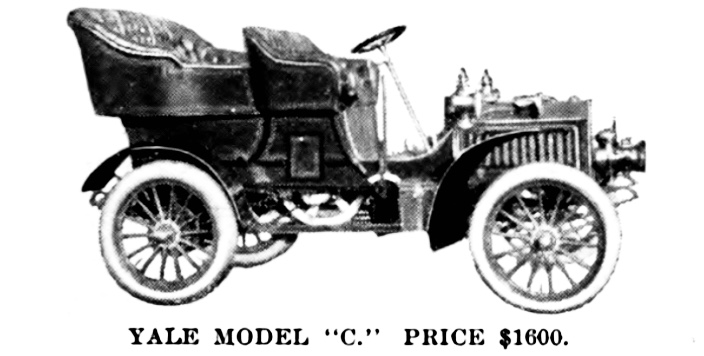
Yale Model C (1904)

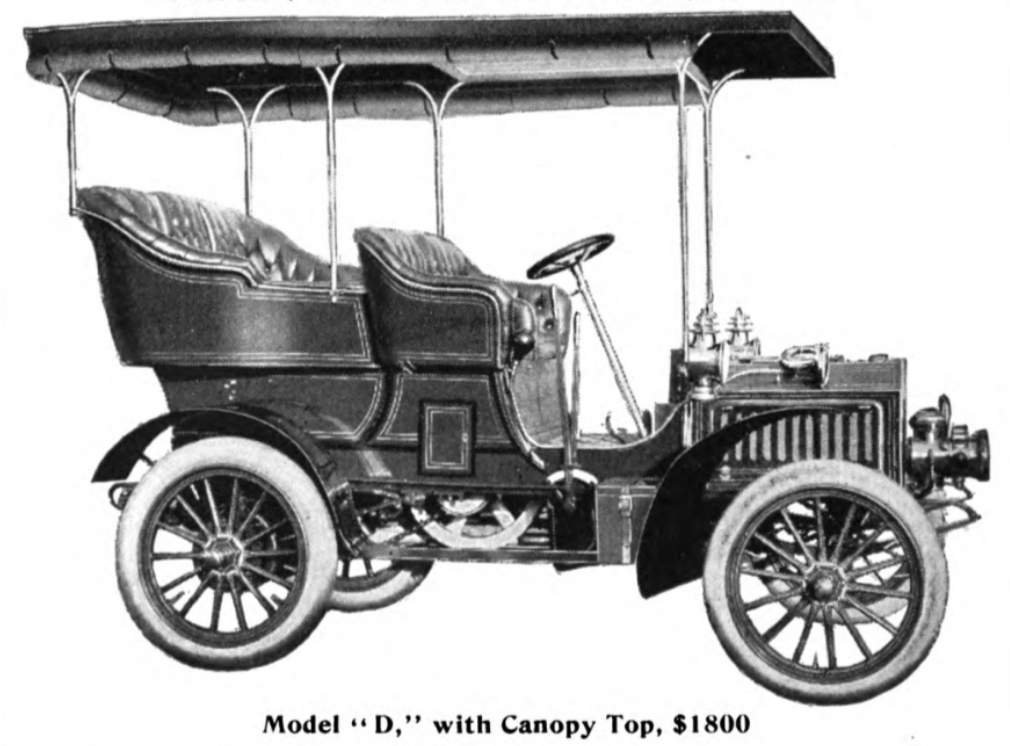
Yale Model D Canopy (1904)

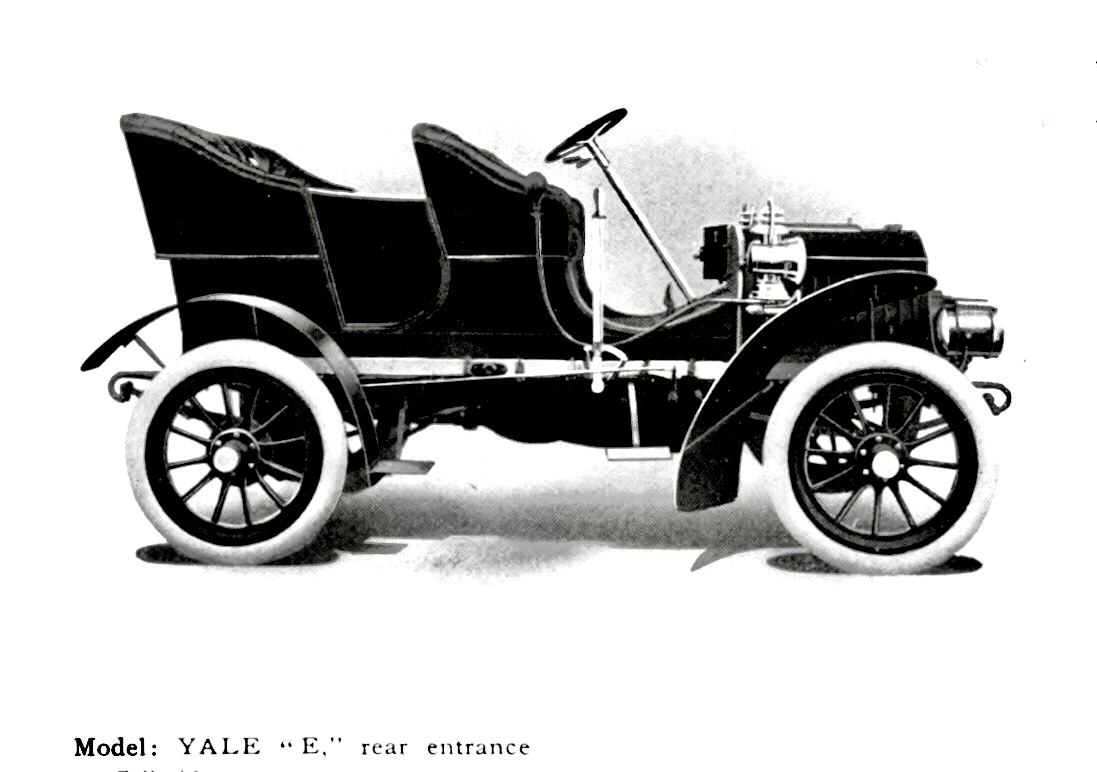
Yale Model E (1905)

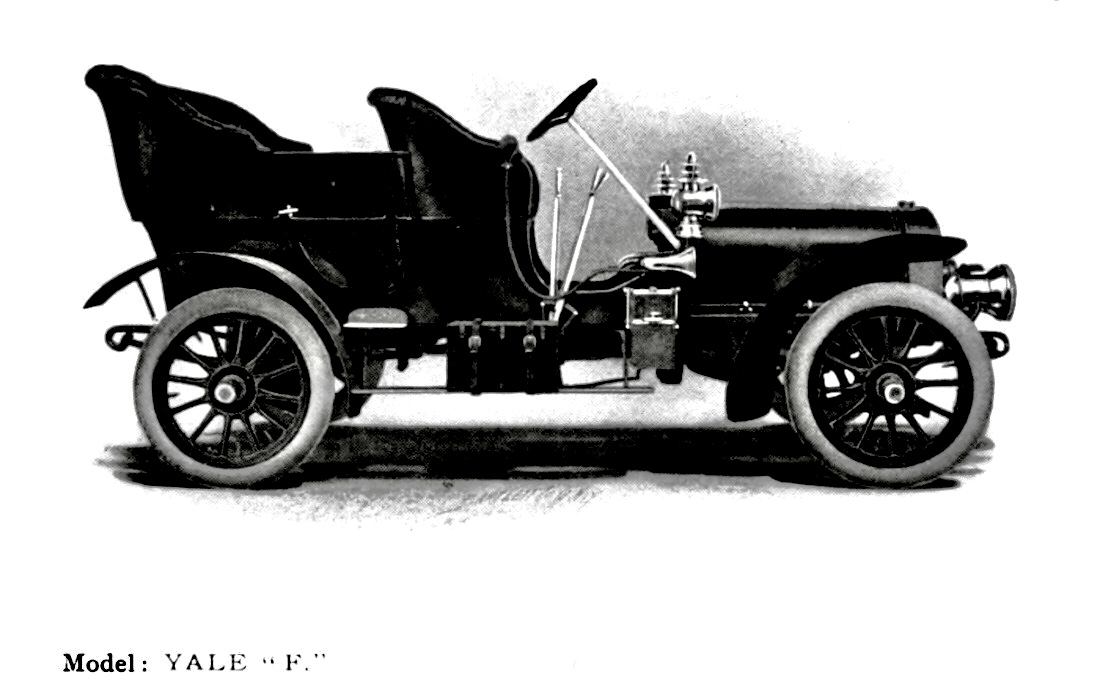
Yale Model F (1905)

The 1904 Yale was a touring car. Equipped with a tonneau, the basic model could seat 5 passengers and sold for US$1500. The car's engine was a horizontally mounted water-cooled flat-2, mid-mounted, which produced 16 hp (12 kW). It powered the wheels through a 2-speed transmission. The car weighed 1,800 lb (820 kg).

A model with a 30 hp (22 kW) engine sold for US$2500. A 12-horsepower Yale touring car was also sold in 1904 for $1700. It was advertised nationally that year in Dun's Review as "the simplest, safest and most economical touring car made in America."

== Production models ==
Year	Model	Cylinder	Horsepower	Wheelbase (mm)	Body design
1902	Model A	2	10		Detachable Tonneau 4-seater
1903	Model A	2	12		Detachable Tonneau 4-seater
1904	Model B	2	16	2134	Touring 4-seater
1904	Model C	2	16		Touring 5-seater
1904	Model D	2	16		Canopy Top Tonneau
1905	Model E	2	14/16	2108	Rear Entrance Tonneau 5-seater
1905	Model F	4	24/28	2642	Touring 5-seater
1905	Model G	2	14/16	2159	Side Entrance Tonneau 5-seater

== Advertisements ==
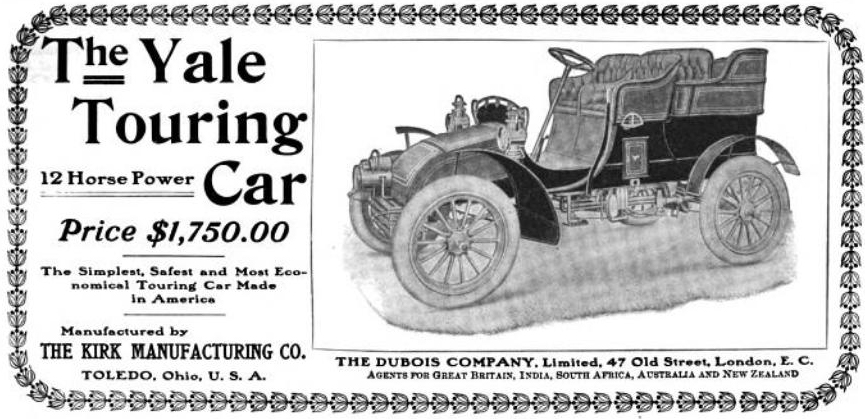
Kirk Manufacturing Company - The Yale Touring Car - 1904

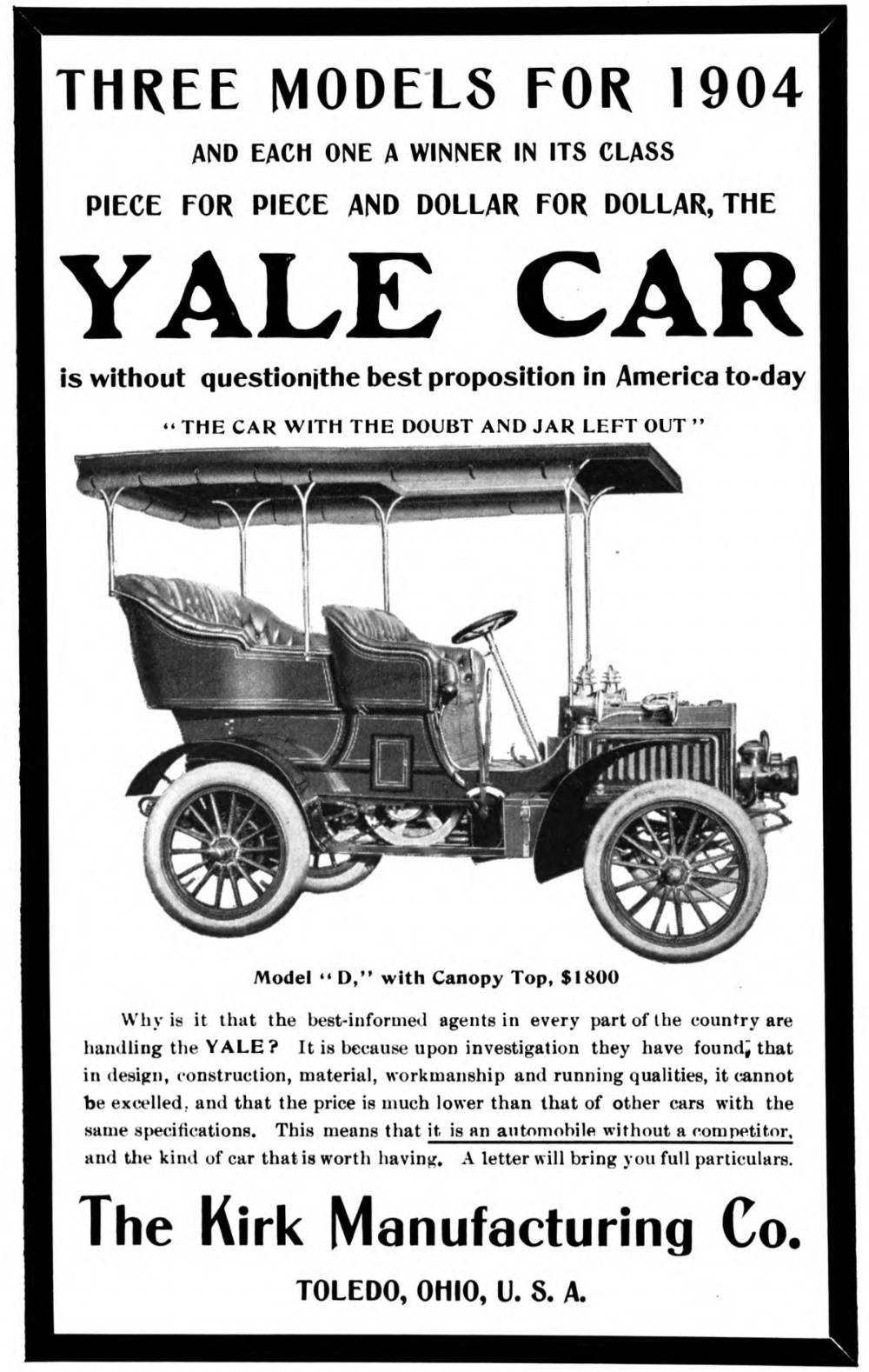
Yale Model D (1904)

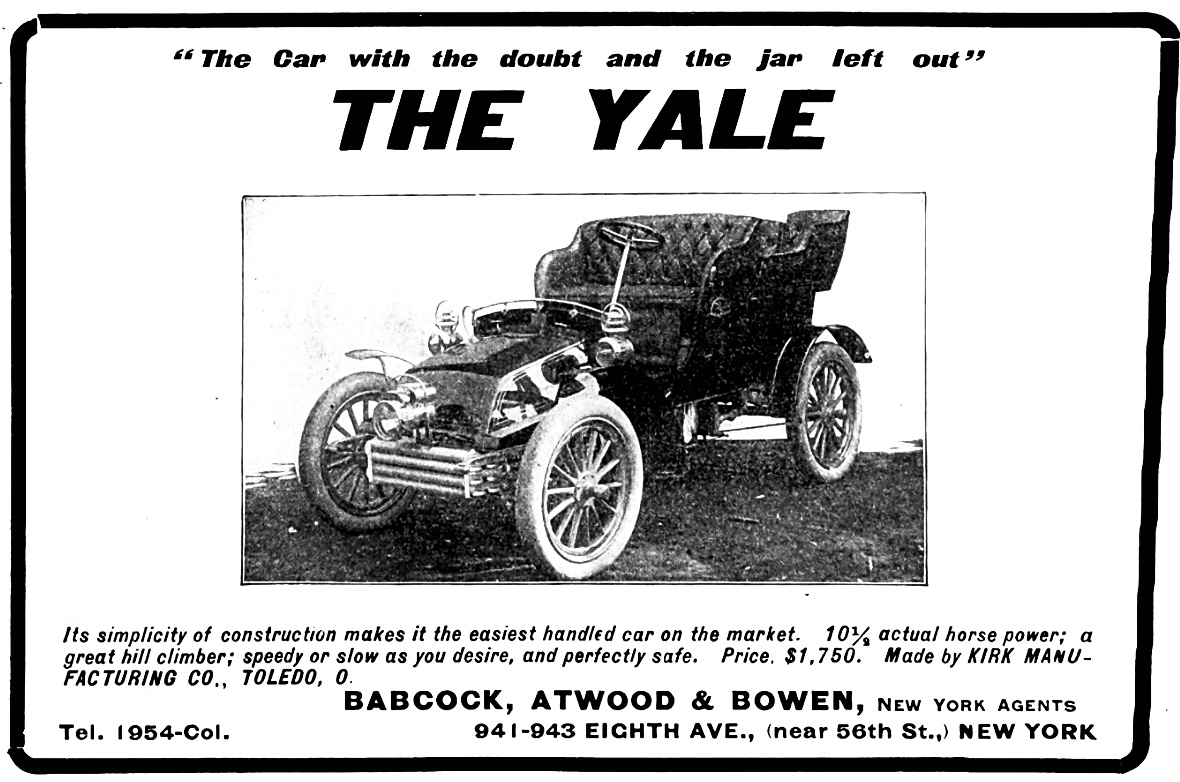
Yale Model A 10,5 HP (1903)

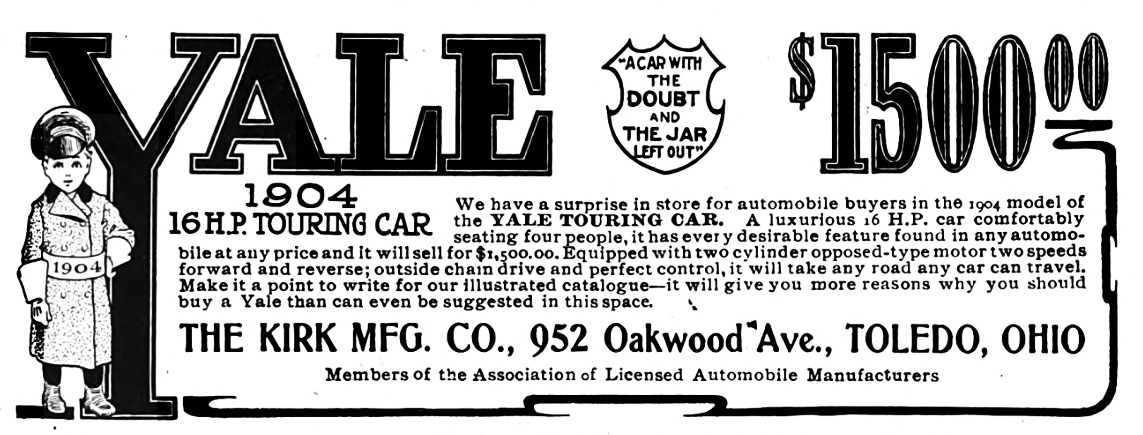
Yale 1904 Touring Car 16 HP
