= Saginaw (automobile) =

Defunct American motor vehicle manufacturer

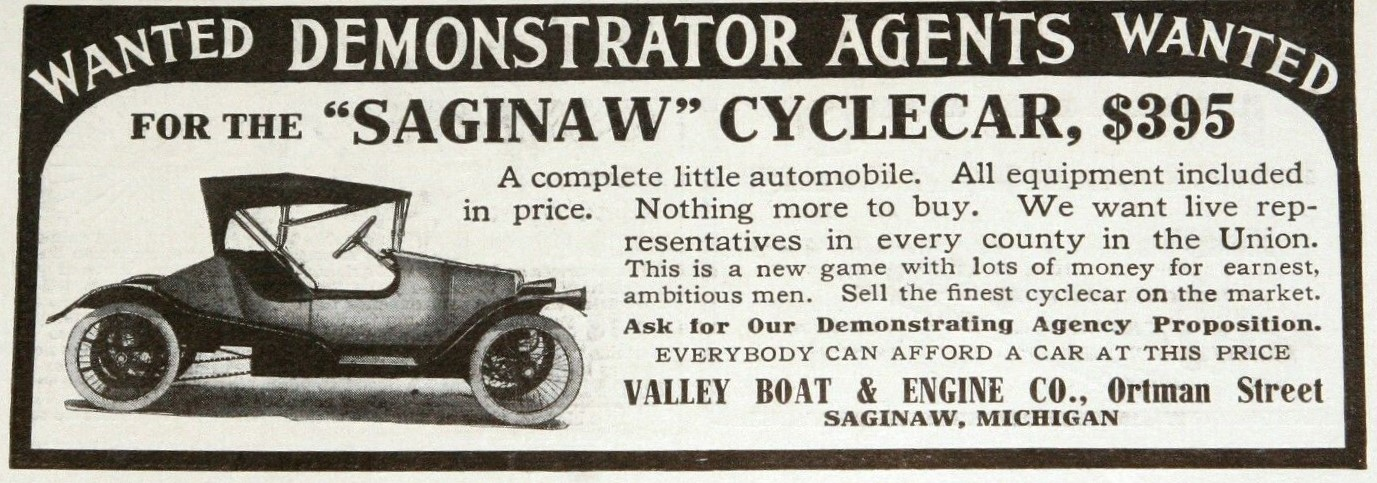
- 1914 Saginaw cyclecar advertisement in Cycle and Automobile Trade Journal

Overview
- Type: Cyclecar
- Manufacturer: Valley Boat & Engine Company
- Production: 1914

Body and chassis
- Class: Cyclecar

The Saginaw cyclecar was built by the Valley Boat & Engine Company of Saginaw, Michigan in 1914.

== History ==
The Saginaw cyclecar, originally to be called the Faultless, was a two-seater with a friction transmission and belt drive. The engine was a V-twin-cylinder manufactured by Valley Boat & Engine Company. Its distinguishing feature was that the headlamps were inset into the front mud guards similar to a Pierce-Arrow. The flowing fenders were built into the body. The price was $395 (equivalent to $12,696 in 2025) which included top, curtains, Stewart-Warner speedometer, tools, tire repair kit and electric horn.

Valley Boat & Engine Company discontinued the Saginaw late in 1914 after an estimated 35 had been built.
