= George G. Adams (architect) =

American architect (1850–1932)

George Gilman Adams
- Born: August 26, 1850; Rollinsford, New Hampshire
- Died: November 28, 1932 (aged 82); Lawrence, Massachusetts
- Occupation: Architect

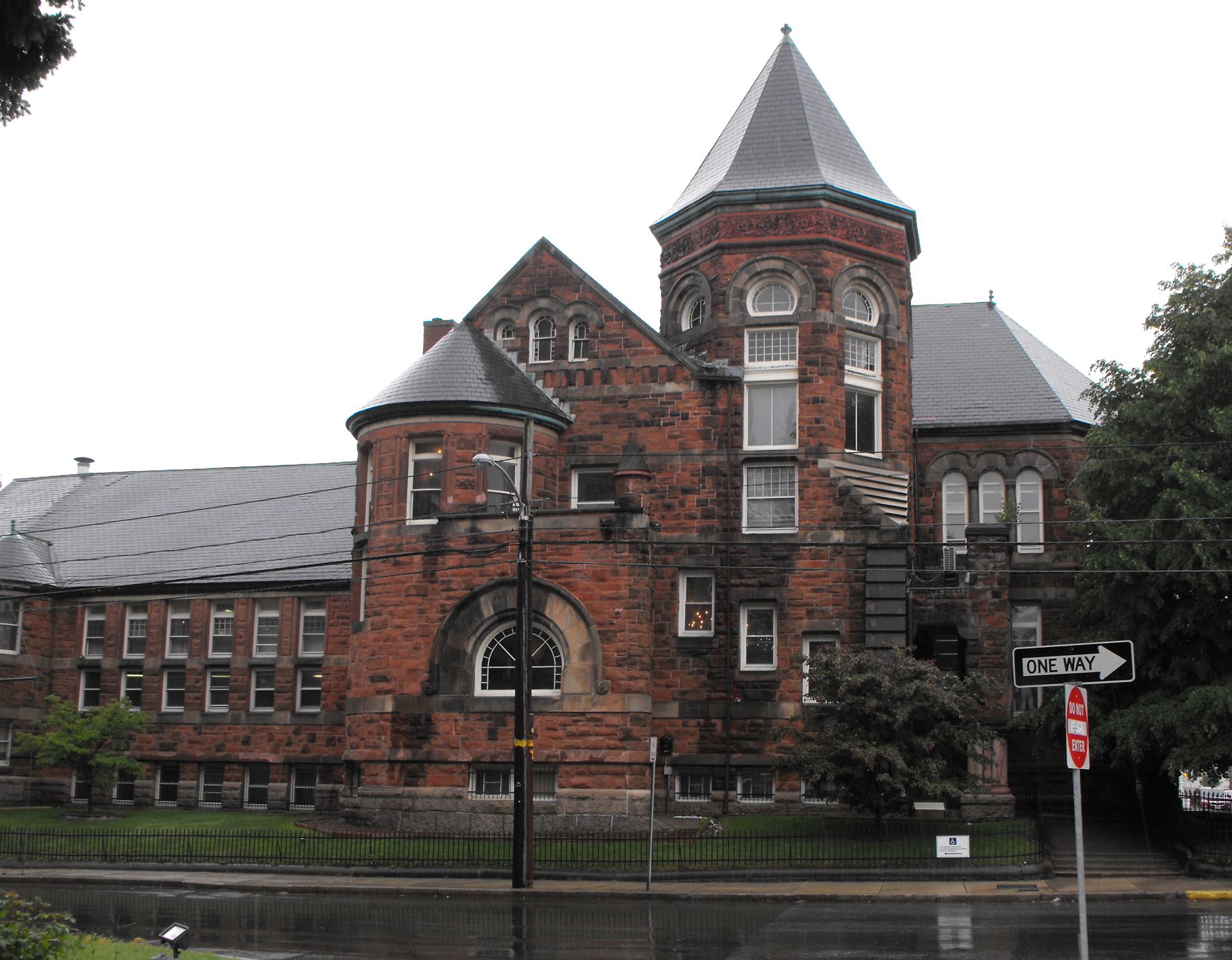
The former Lawrence Public Library, designed by Adams and completed in 1892.

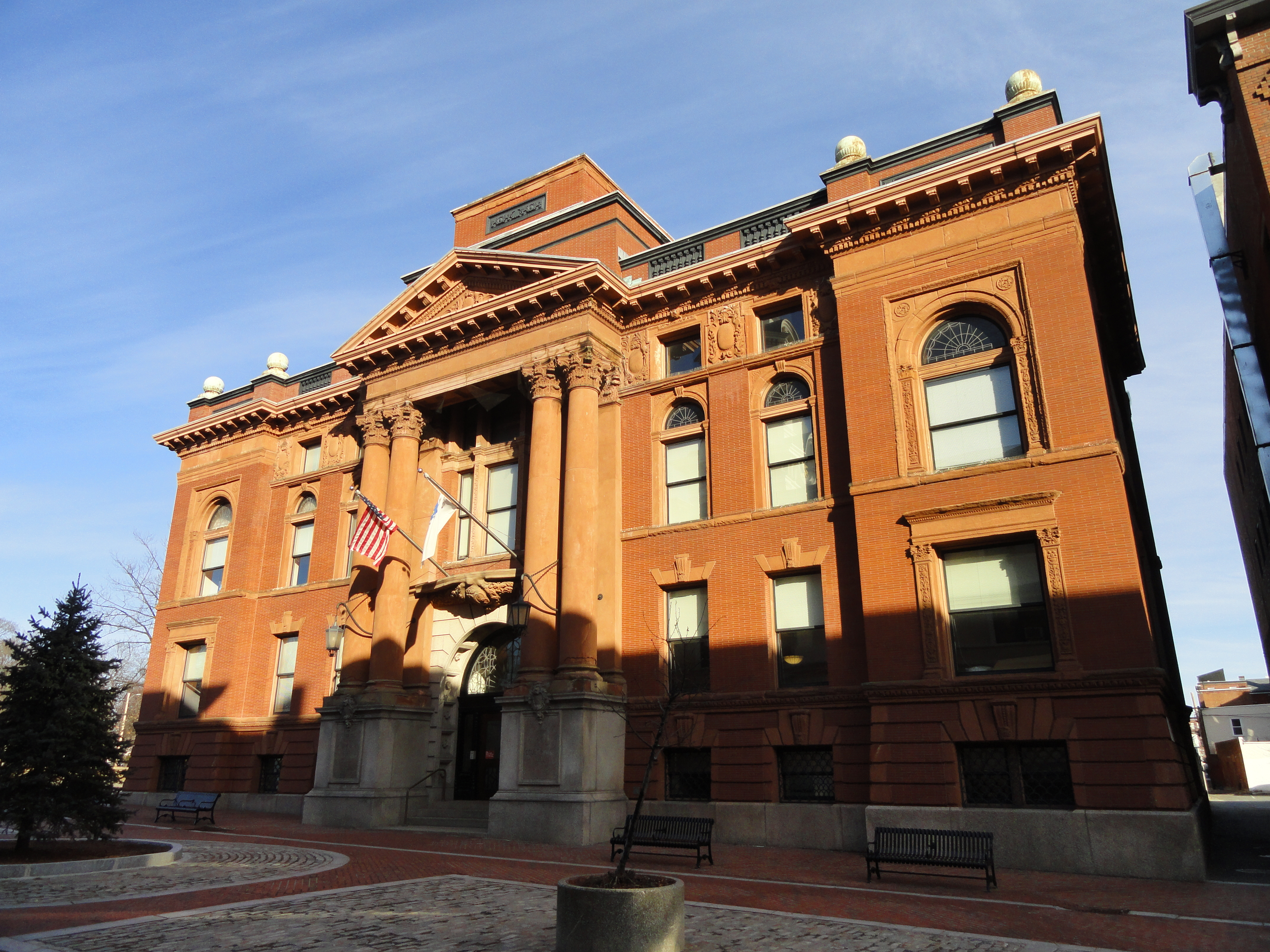
The Essex County Courthouse in Lawrence, completed in 1903.

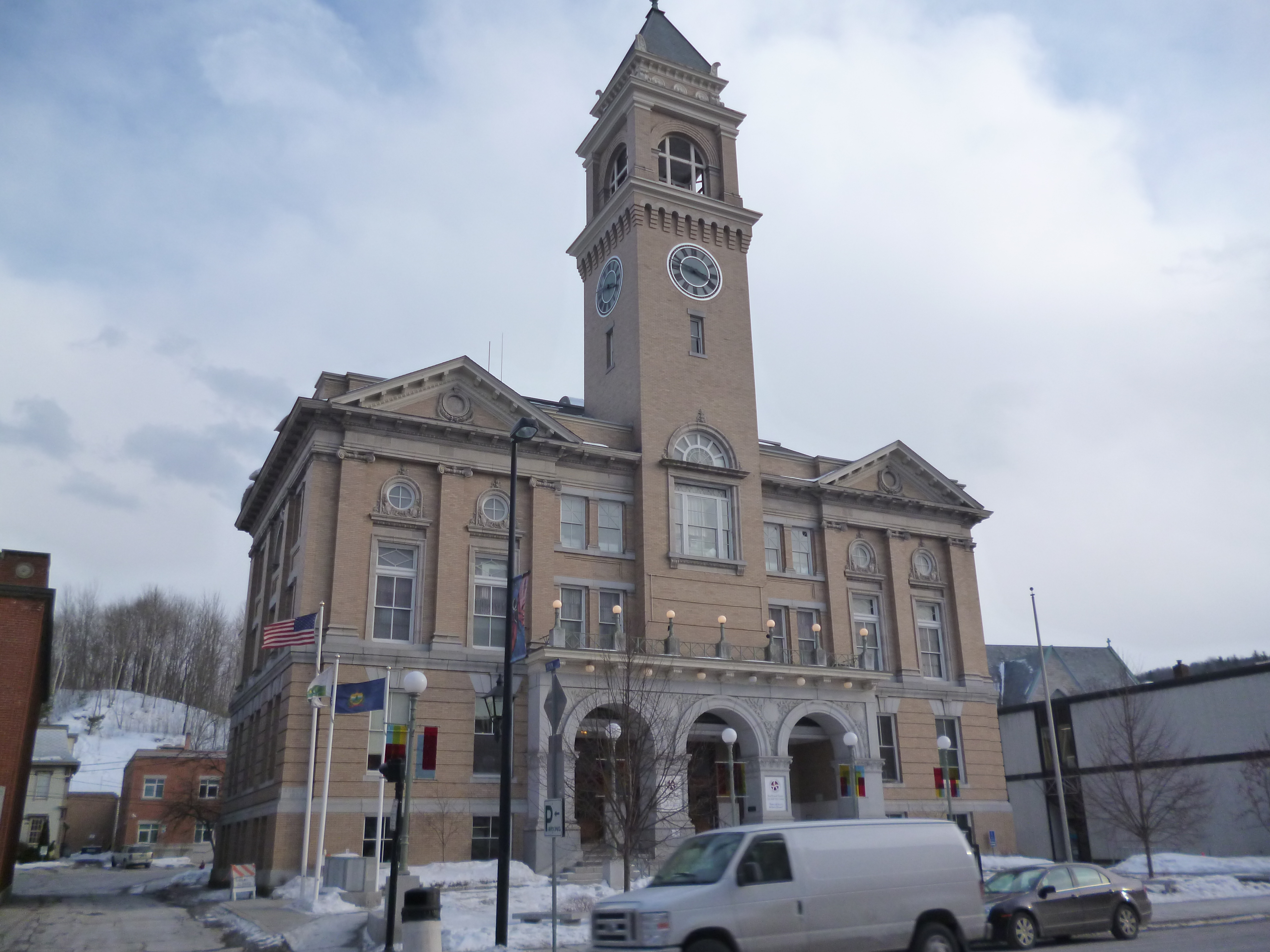
The Montpelier City Hall, completed in 1911.

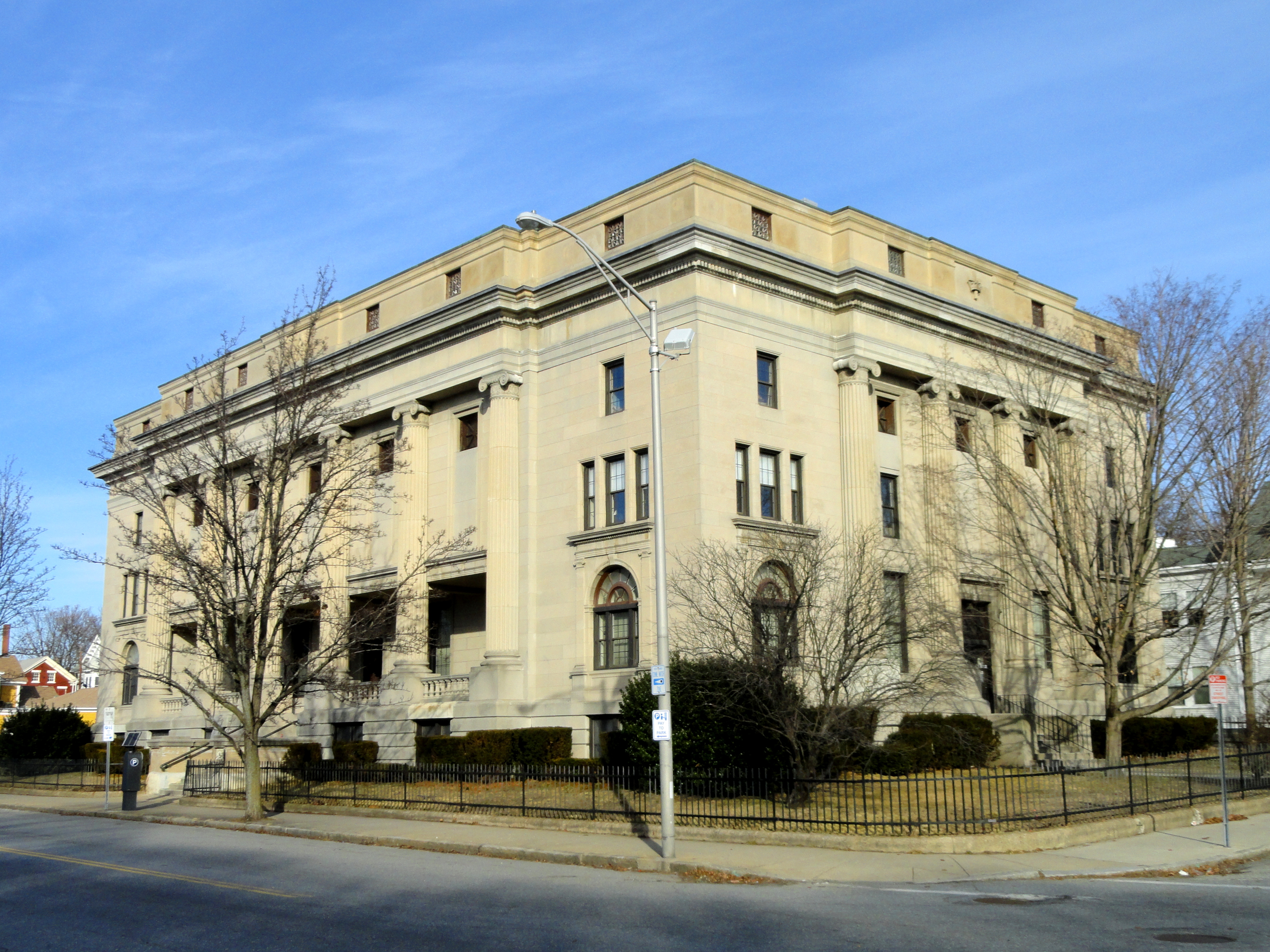
The Masonic Temple in Lawrence, completed in 1923.

George G. Adams (August 26, 1850 – November 28, 1932) was an American architect from Lawrence, Massachusetts.

== Life and career ==
George Gilman Adams was born August 26, 1850, in Rollinsford, New Hampshire, to Benjamin Gilman Adams, a mill superintendent, and Sophia (Nutter) Adams. In 1854 the family moved to Lawrence, then a growing industrial city. He was educated in the Lawrence public schools before joining the office of civil engineer Baldwin Coolidge as a drafter in 1870. Two years later he joined the office of local architect Charles T. Emerson as a student. (Note: Charles T. Emerson was the first architect to open an office in Lawrence. His extant works include the former gatehouse at the High Service Water Tower and Reservoir (1874) in Lawrence and the Byfield School in Bristol, Rhode Island (1872).) In 1875 Emerson and Adams formed a partnership, which lasted until 1878, when Emerson moved his business to Boston. Adams then opened his own office in Lawrence, from which he practiced for some forty years. From c. 1889 to 1891 Adams was in partnership with architect William P. Regan, but only two buildings can be positively attributed to the partnership.

In 1916 Adams, a Mason, was commissioned to design the new Masonic Temple in Lawrence. Though drawings were completed in 1917, the money to build was not available. Adams, then in his late 60s, chose to retire from business. In 1921 funds became available to complete the building, and Adams came out of retirement to execute the project. He associated himself with David M. Brown of Boston, a recent graduate of the Massachusetts Institute of Technology. Once the building was completed, Brown returned to Boston and Adams resumed practice full-time, retiring only shortly before his death.

In 1890 Adams built the Adams Block on Essex Street in Lawrence as an investment property, and maintained his practice there until temporary retirement. In the 1920s he practiced out of an office in the Bay State Building.

== Personal life ==
In 1875 Adams was married to Mary Maria Leslie of Lynnfield. They had no children. In 1888 they moved into a large house, designed by Adams, at 1 Berkeley Street in Lawrence. Continued business success allowed the couple to move into a new Adams–designed house at 351 Prospect Street in 1907. Adams died November 28, 1932, at home.

== Legacy ==
During his sixty–year career, Adams was the leading architect in Lawrence and its environs. He was noted throughout New England as an architect of public buildings. In addition to those he designed in Lawrence and Massachusetts, Adams designed a number of courthouses, town and city halls, libraries and other buildings in Maine, New Hampshire, New York and Vermont. At least eight buildings designed by Adams have been listed on the United States National Register of Historic Places, and others contribute to listed historic districts.

== Architectural works ==
- Francis C. Clarke house, (Note: A contributing property to the Machine Shop Village District, NRHP–listed in 1982.) 247 Main St, North Andover, Massachusetts (1880)
- Asa Simons house, 213 Broadway, Methuen, Massachusetts (1881)
- Rockingham Town Hall, 7 The Square, Bellows Falls, Vermont (1886, burned 1925)
- Amesbury City Hall, 62 Friend St, Amesbury, Massachusetts (1887–88)
- Centralville M. E. Church, 800 Bridge St, Lowell, Massachusetts (1888)
- First Free Will Baptist Church, (Note: A contributing property to the Wellington Street Apartment House District, NRHP–listed in 1980.) 63 Wellington St, Worcester, Massachusetts (1888)
- Hampton Town Hall, 136 Winnacunnet Rd, Hampton, New Hampshire (1888, burned 1949)
- Odd Fellows Building, 108 Main St, North Andover, Massachusetts (1888, partially extant)
- Bradlee School, (Note: A contributing property to the Ballardvale District, NRHP–listed in 1982.) 147 Andover St, Andover, Massachusetts (1889, NRHP 1982)
- Marston Building, (Note: Designed in partnership with William P. Regan.) 155 Middlesex St, Lowell, Massachusetts (1889)
- James Pierce house, (Note: A contributing property to the Pleasant–High Historic District, NRHP–listed in 1984.) 15 Pleasant St, Methuen, Massachusetts (1889–90)
- Strafford County Courthouse (former), 10 2nd St, Dover, New Hampshire (1889)
- Adams Block, (Note: A contributing property to the Downtown Lawrence Historic District, NRHP–listed in 1979.) 288 Essex St, Lawrence, Massachusetts (1890)
- Central Police Station (former), 11 Court St, Nashua, New Hampshire (1890–91)
- Dover City Hall, 288 Central Ave, Dover, New Hampshire (1890–91, burned 1933)
- New Hampshire Soldiers' Home, 139 Winter St, Tilton, New Hampshire (1890, demolished)
- Waterford High School, 46 4th St, Waterford, New York (1891, demolished 1961)
- Lawrence Public Library (former), 190 Hampshire St, Lawrence, Massachusetts (1892 and 1900, NRHP 1978)
- John R. Rollins School, Howard and Platt Sts, Lawrence, Massachusetts (1892, NRHP 2000)
- Randall Library, 19 Crescent St, Stow, Massachusetts (1893)
- Rockingham County Courthouse, 11 Front St, Exeter, New Hampshire (1893, demolished 1969)
- E. Frank Lewis house, 178 E Haverhill St, Lawrence, Massachusetts (1894)
- YMCA Building, 33 West St, Keene, New Hampshire (1894, demolished)
- Gleason Library, 22 Bedford Rd, Carlisle, Massachusetts (1895–96)
- High Service Water Tower, Ames St, Lawrence, Massachusetts (1896, NRHP 1978)
- Waterville Opera House and City Hall, (Note: A contributing property to the Waterville Main Street Historic District, NRHP–listed in 2012.) 1 Common St, Waterville, Maine (1897–1902, NRHP 1976)
- Odd Fellows Building, 24 E Broadway, Derry, New Hampshire (1898, demolished)
- Odd Fellows Building, (Note: A contributing property to the Spicket Falls Historic District, NRHP–listed in 1984.) 7 Hampshire St, Methuen, Massachusetts (1898–99)
- Barre City Hall and Opera House, (Note: A contributing property to the Barre Downtown Historic District, NRHP–listed in 1979.) 6 N Main St, Barre, Vermont (1899, NRHP 1973)
- Essex County Courthouse, 43 Appleton St, Lawrence, Massachusetts (1901–03)
- Simon Fairfield Public Library, 290 Main St, Douglas, Massachusetts (1903)
- Adams Memorial Building, 29 W Broadway, Derry, New Hampshire (1904, NRHP 1982)
- Bay State Building, 11 Lawrence St, Lawrence, Massachusetts (1904–05)
- Colonial Theatre, 12 Hampshire St, Lawrence, Massachusetts (1904, demolished)
- Rochester Opera House and City Hall, (Note: A contributing property to the Rochester Commercial and Industrial District, NRHP–listed in 1983.) 31 Wakefield St, Rochester, New Hampshire (1906–08)
- George G. Adams house, 351 Prospect St, Lawrence, Massachusetts (1907)
- American Woolen Company office building, (Note: A contributing property to the North Canal Historic District, NRHP–listed in 1984.) 1 Mill St, Lawrence, Massachusetts (1907)
- Montpelier City Hall, (Note: A contributing property to the Montpelier Historic District, NRHP–listed in 1978.) 39 Main St, Montpelier, Vermont (1909–11)
- Stevens Memorial Hall, 1 Chester St, Chester, New Hampshire (1909–10, NRHP 2004)
- Truell Building, 372 Essex St, Lawrence, Massachusetts (1909, demolished 2010)
- Dr. Fred L. Smalley House, 62-64 Woburn Street, Reading, MA (1911)
- St. Mary of the Assumption R. C. Church, (Note: A contributing property to the Waterford Village Historic District, NRHP–listed in 1977.) 119 Broad St, Waterford, New York (1911–13)
- Lawrence Street Congregational Church, 54 Lawrence St, Lawrence, Massachusetts (1915–18)
- Charles M. Floyd School, 37 Highland Ave, Derry, New Hampshire (1916)
- Masonic Temple, (Note: A contributing property to the Jackson Terrace Historic District, NRHP–listed in 1984.) 43 Jackson St, Lawrence, Massachusetts (1922–23)
- Lawrence City Hall remodeling, 100 Common St, Lawrence, Massachusetts (1923)
- Lawrence Gas Company Building, 370 Essex St, Lawrence, Massachusetts (1924, altered)
- Derry Library, 64 E Broadway, Derry, New Hampshire (1926–27)

== Gallery of architectural works ==
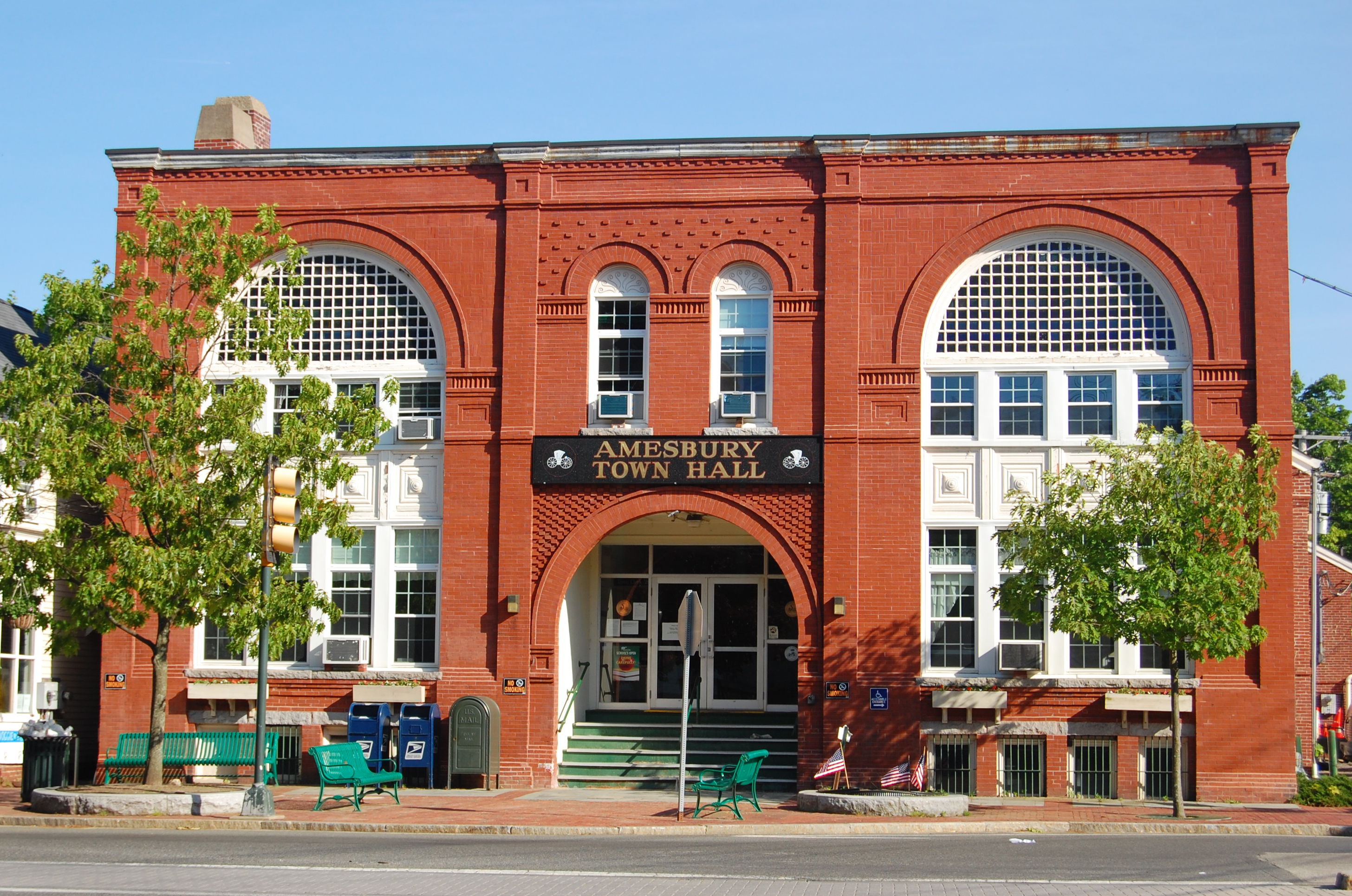
Amesbury City Hall, Amesbury, Massachusetts, 1887.

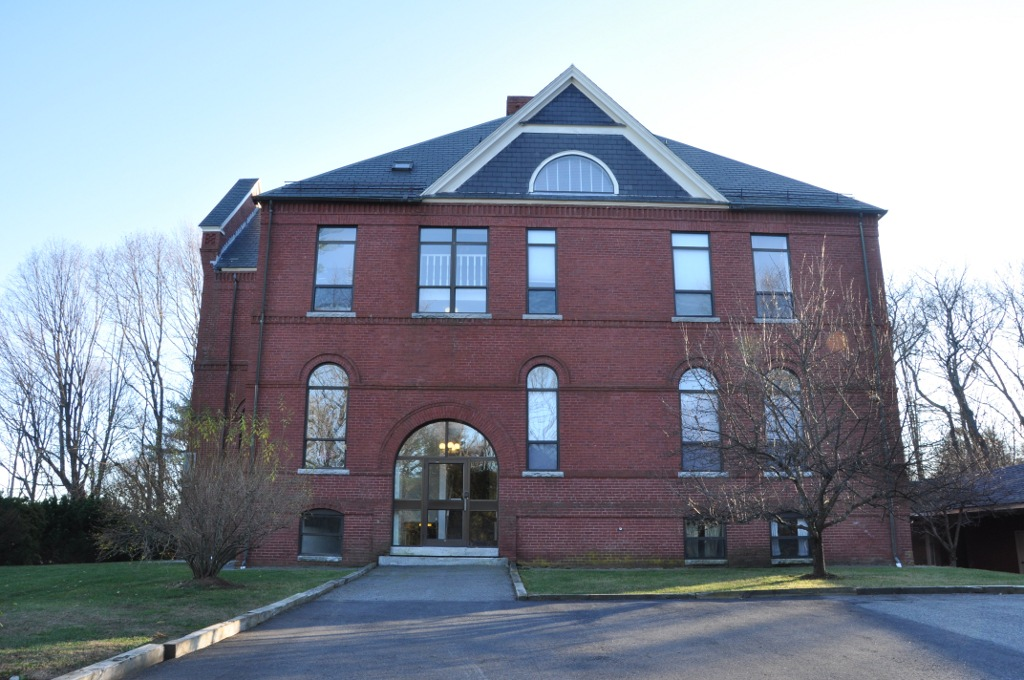
Bradlee School, Andover, Massachusetts, 1889.

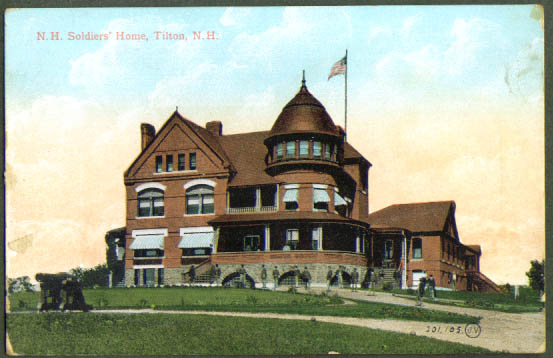
New Hampshire Soldiers' Home, Tilton, New Hampshire, 1890.

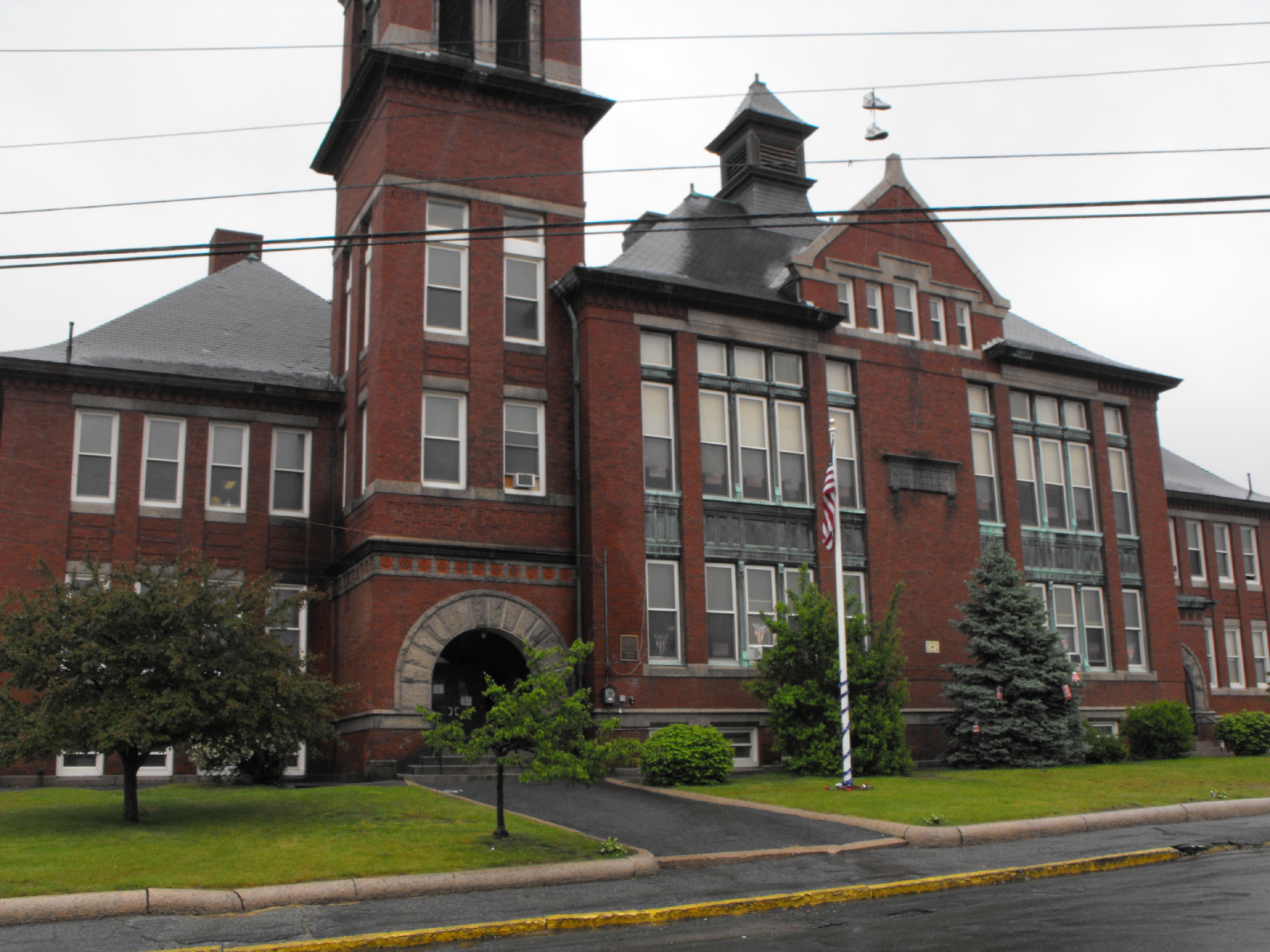
John R. Rollins School, Lawrence, Massachusetts, 1892.

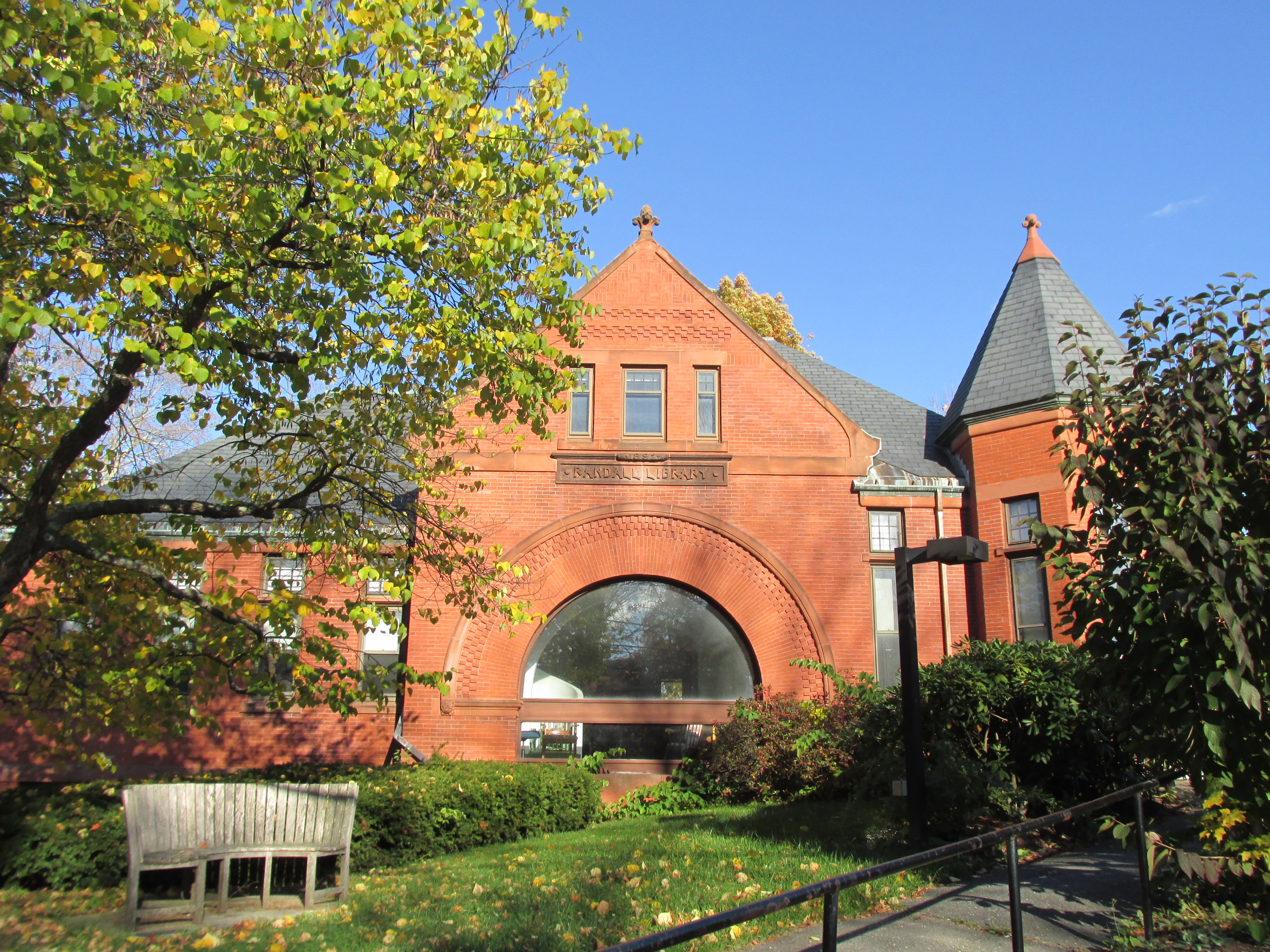
Randall Library, Stow, Massachusetts, 1893.

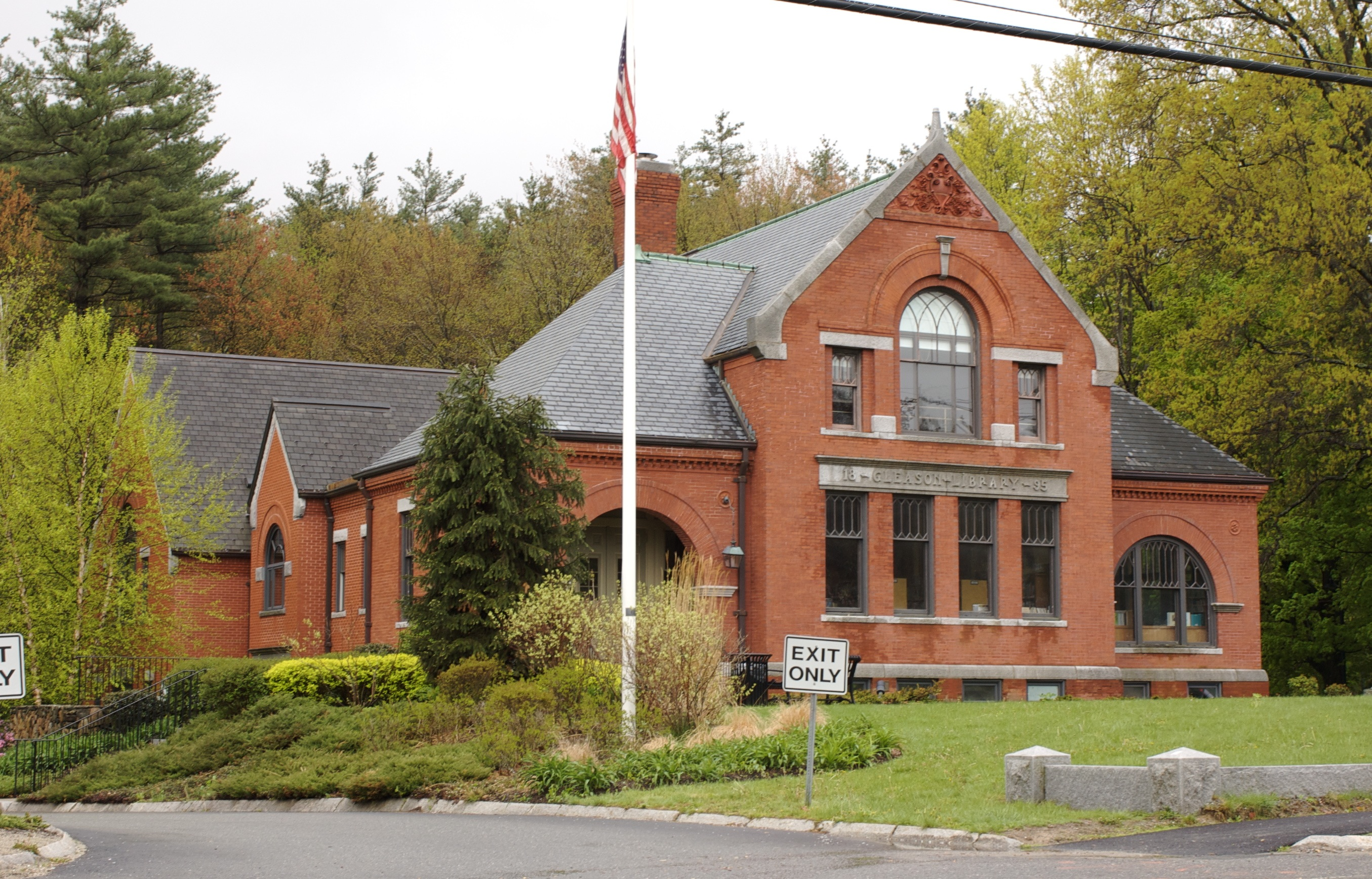
Gleason Library, Carlisle, Massachusetts, 1895.

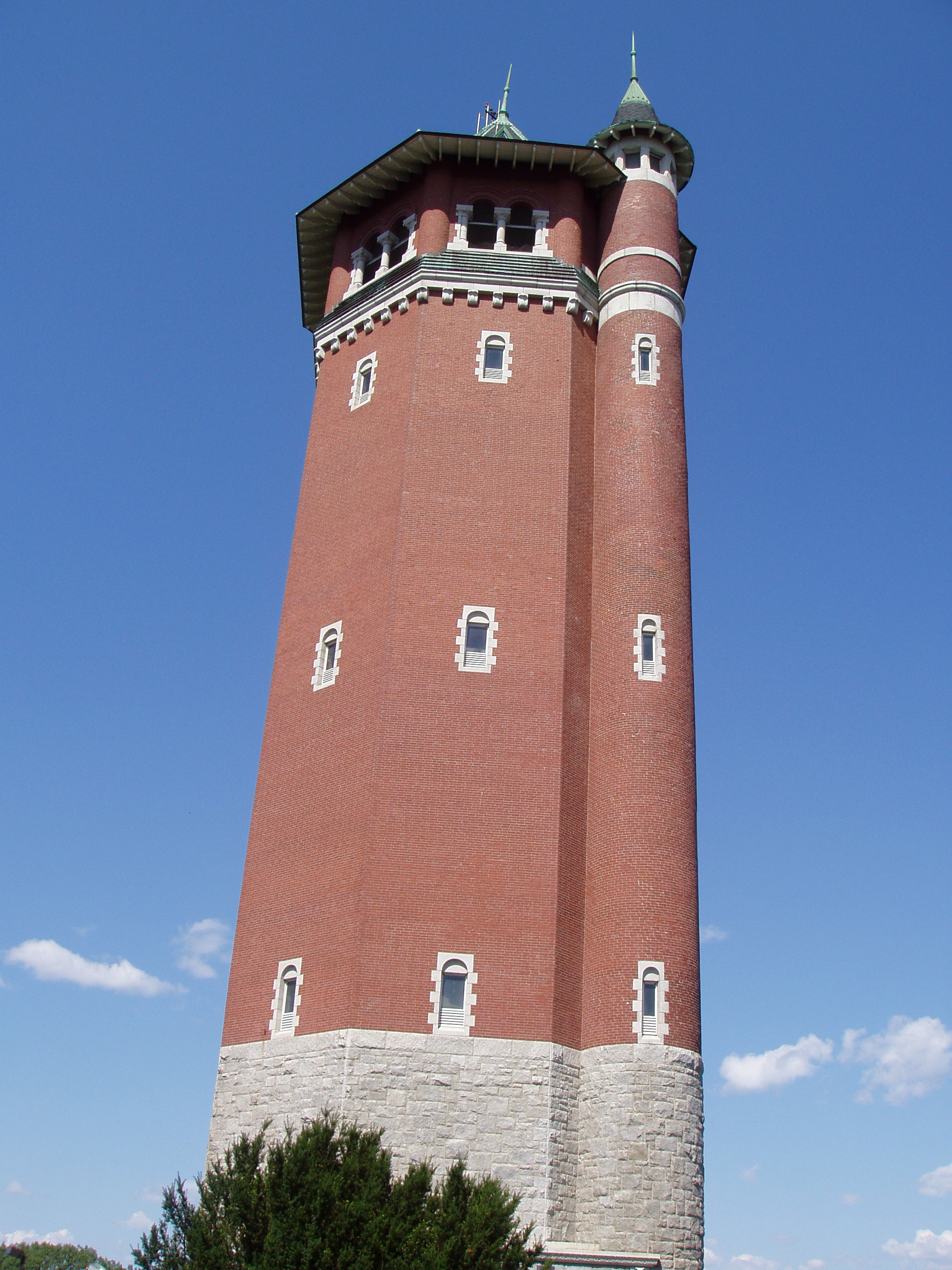
High Service Water Tower, Lawrence, Massachusetts, 1896.

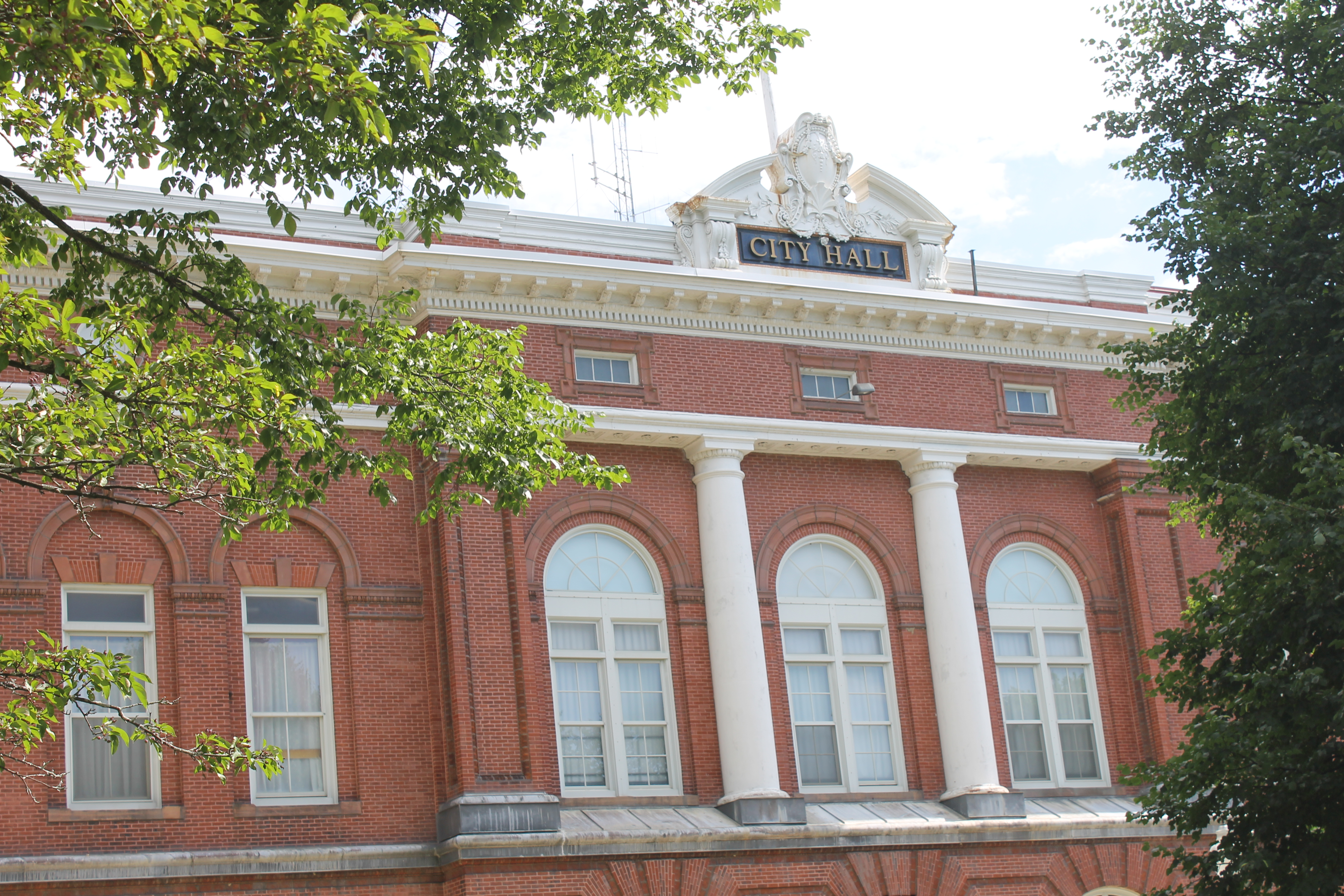
Waterville Opera House and City Hall, Waterville, Maine, 1897-1902.

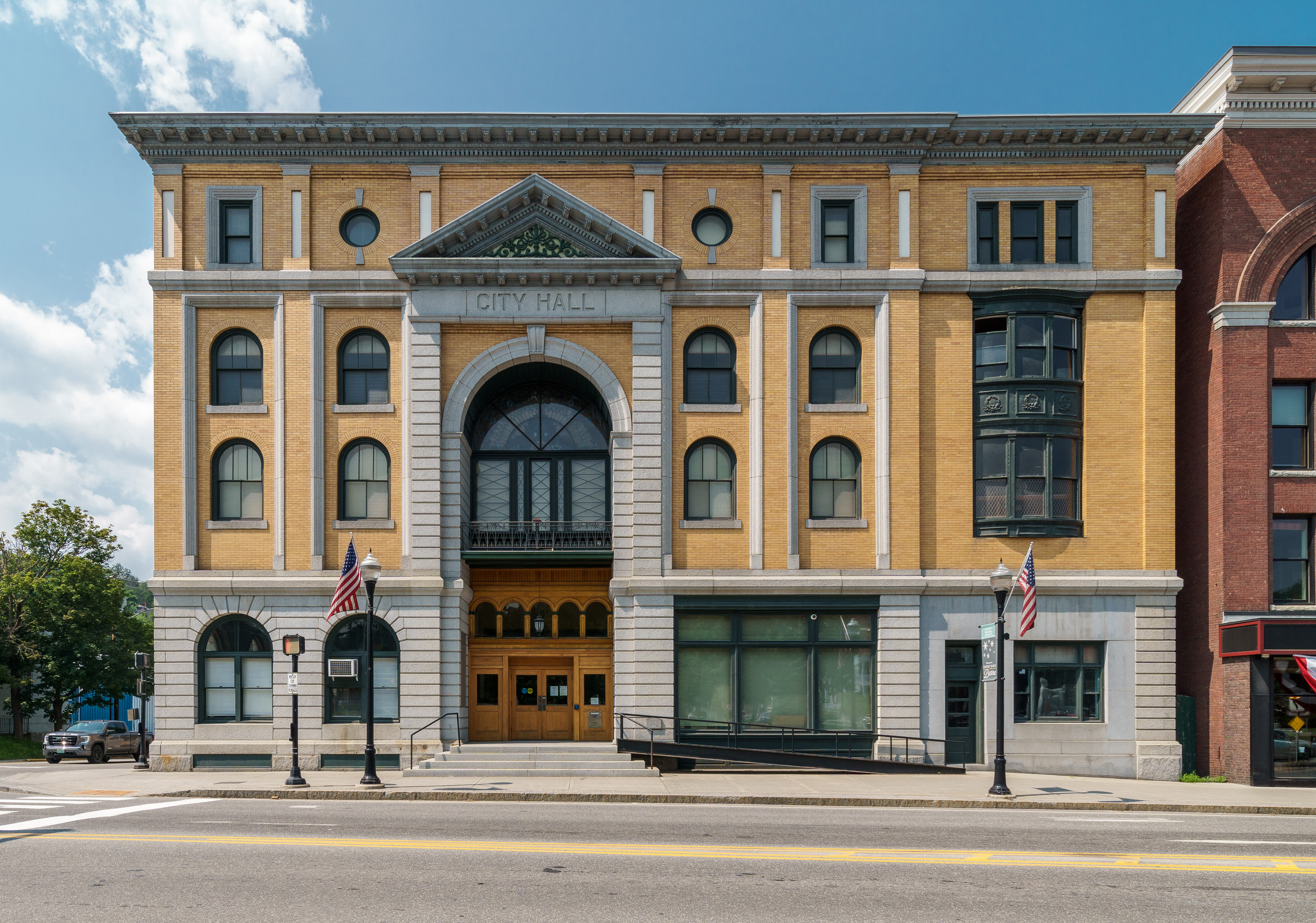
Barre City Hall and Opera House, Barre, Vermont, 1899.

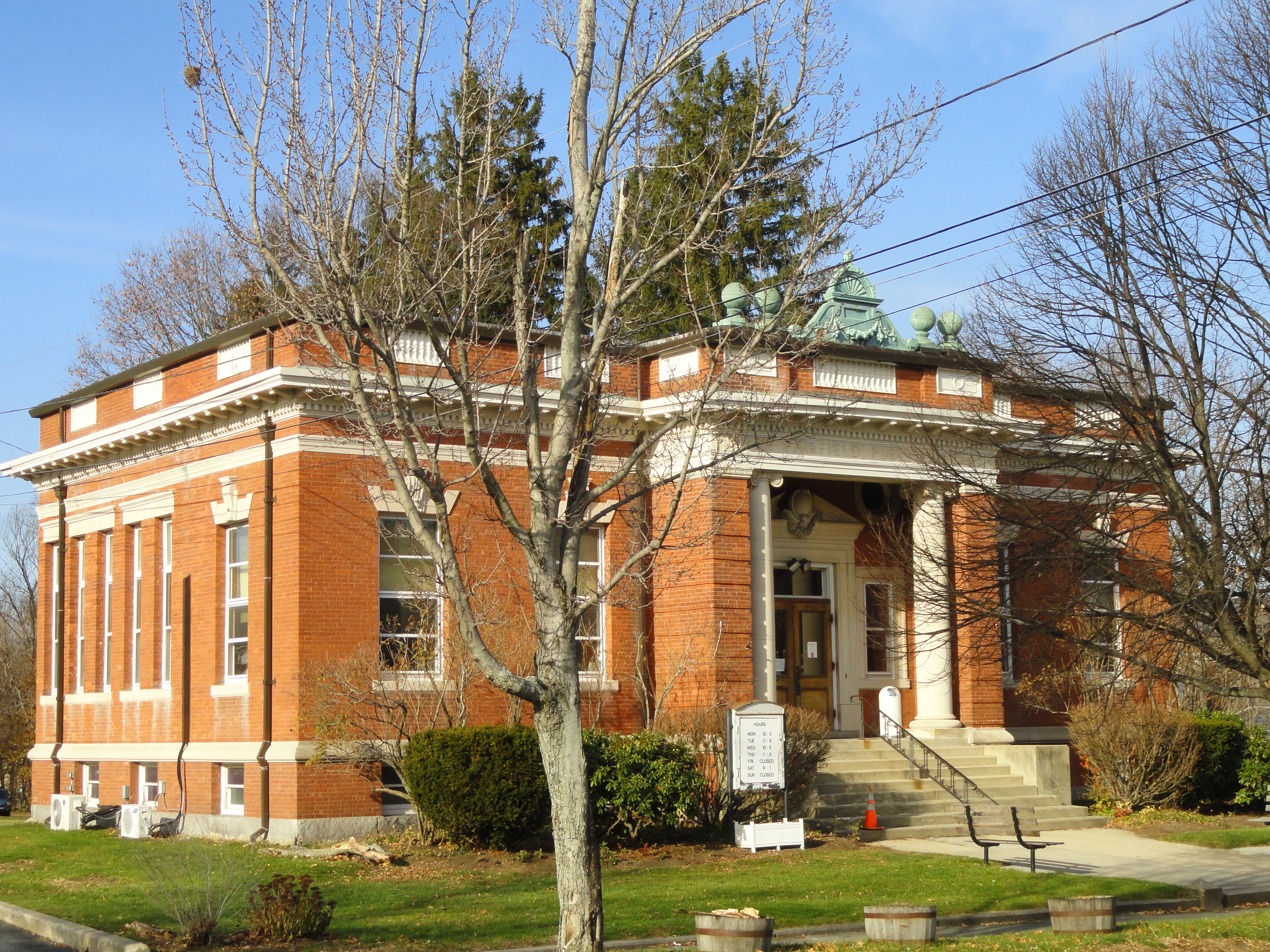
Simon Fairfield Public Library, Douglas, Massachusetts, 1903.

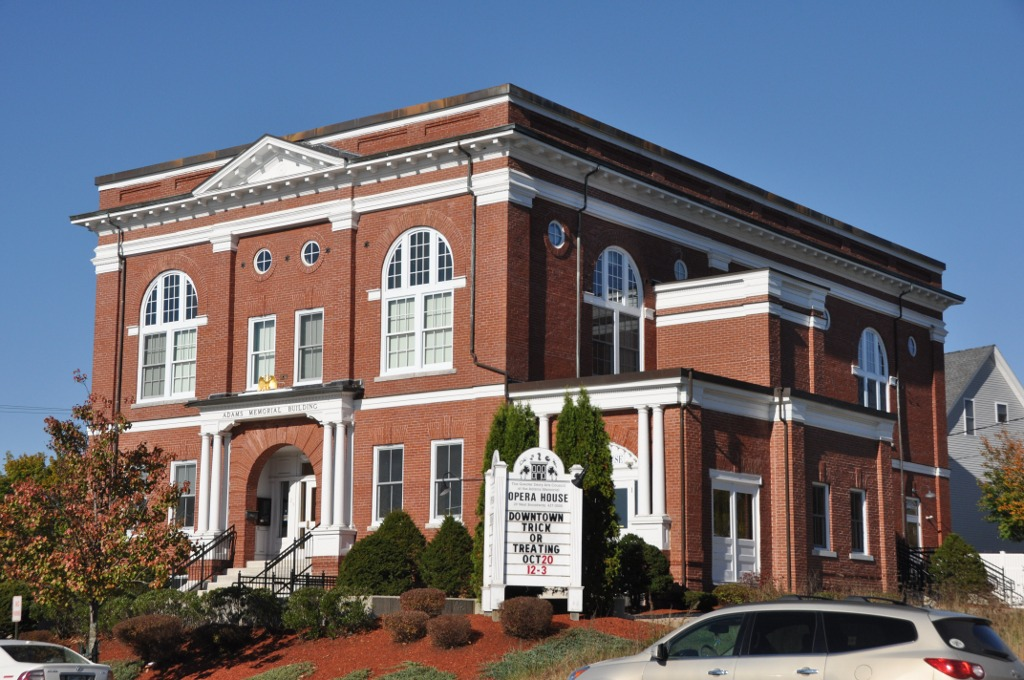
Adams Memorial Building, Derry, New Hampshire, 1904.

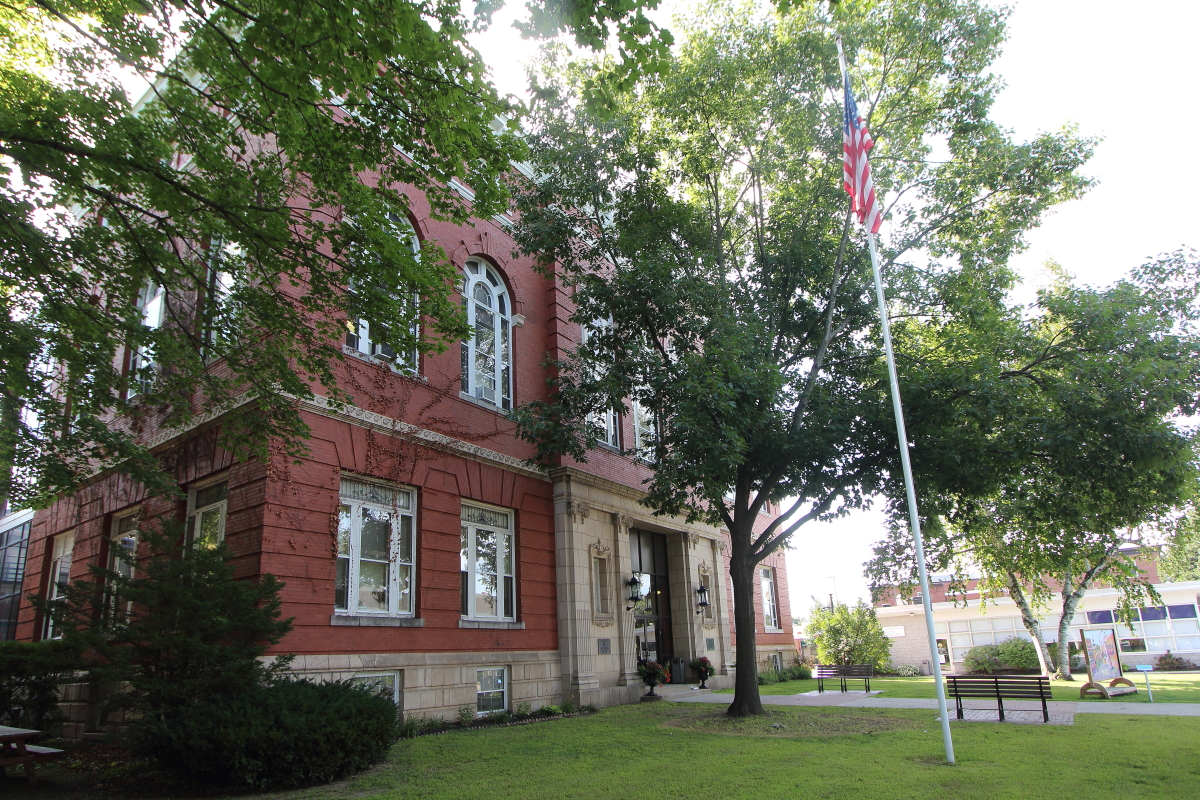
Rochester Opera House and City Hall, Rochester, New Hampshire, 1906-08.

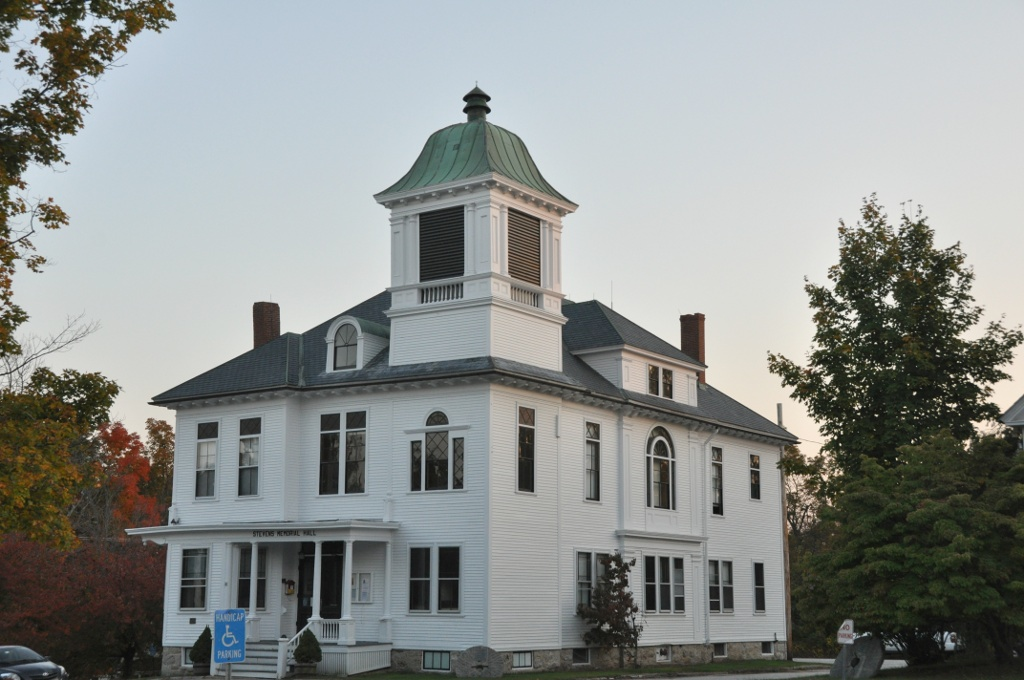
Stevens Memorial Hall, Chester, New Hampshire, 1909.

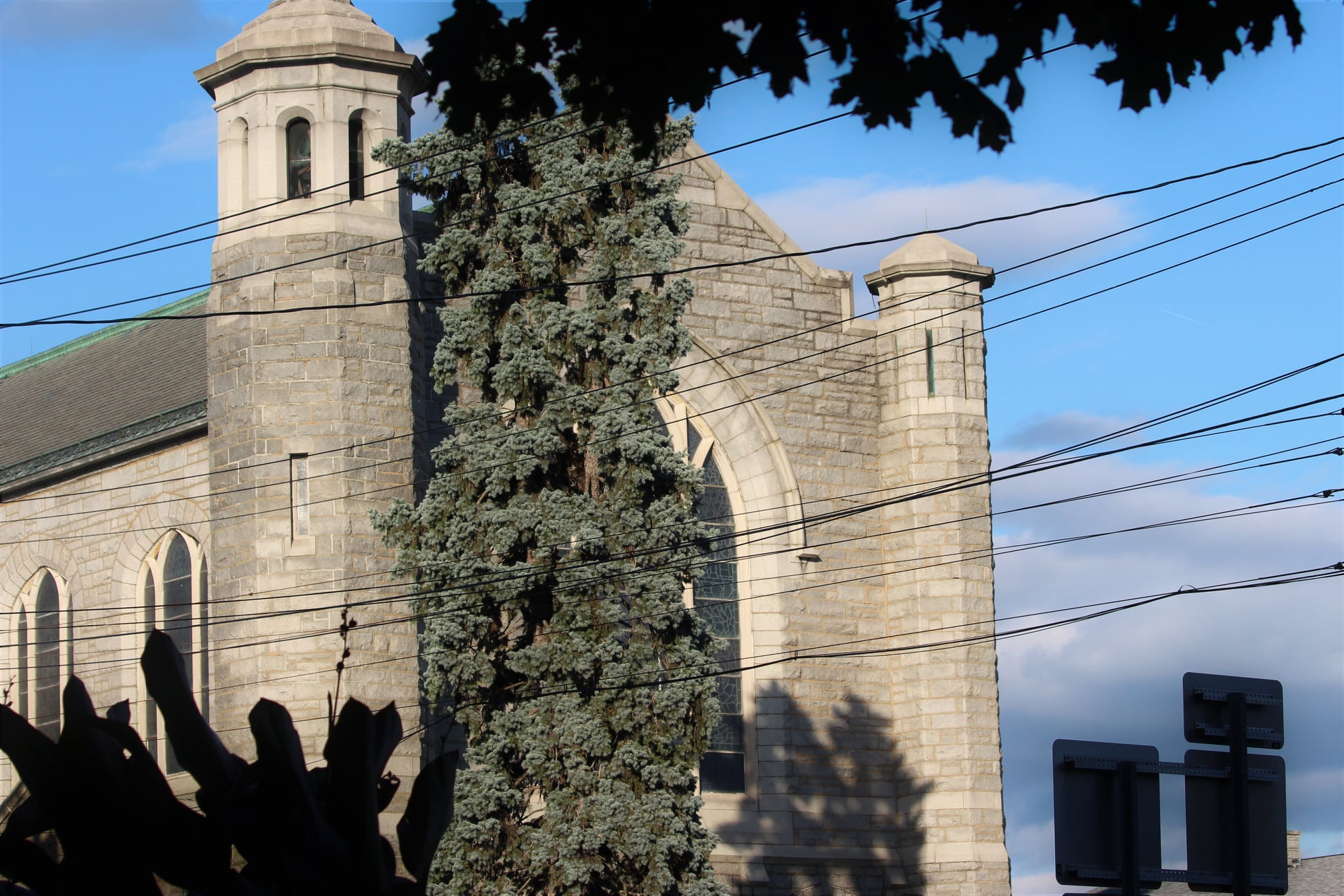
St. Mary of the Assumption R. C. Church, Waterford, New York, 1911-13.

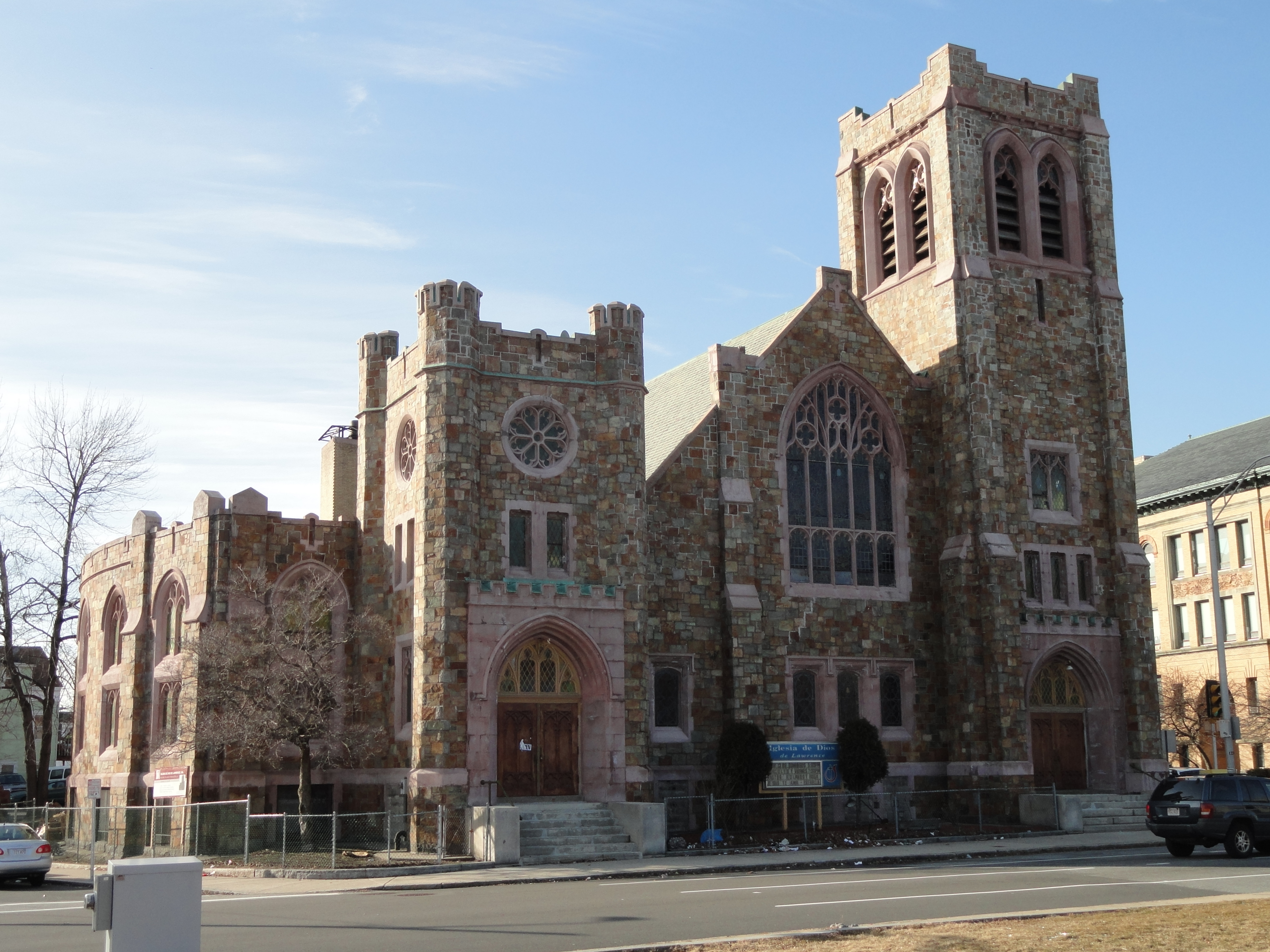
Lawrence Street Congregational Church, Lawrence, Massachusetts, 1915.

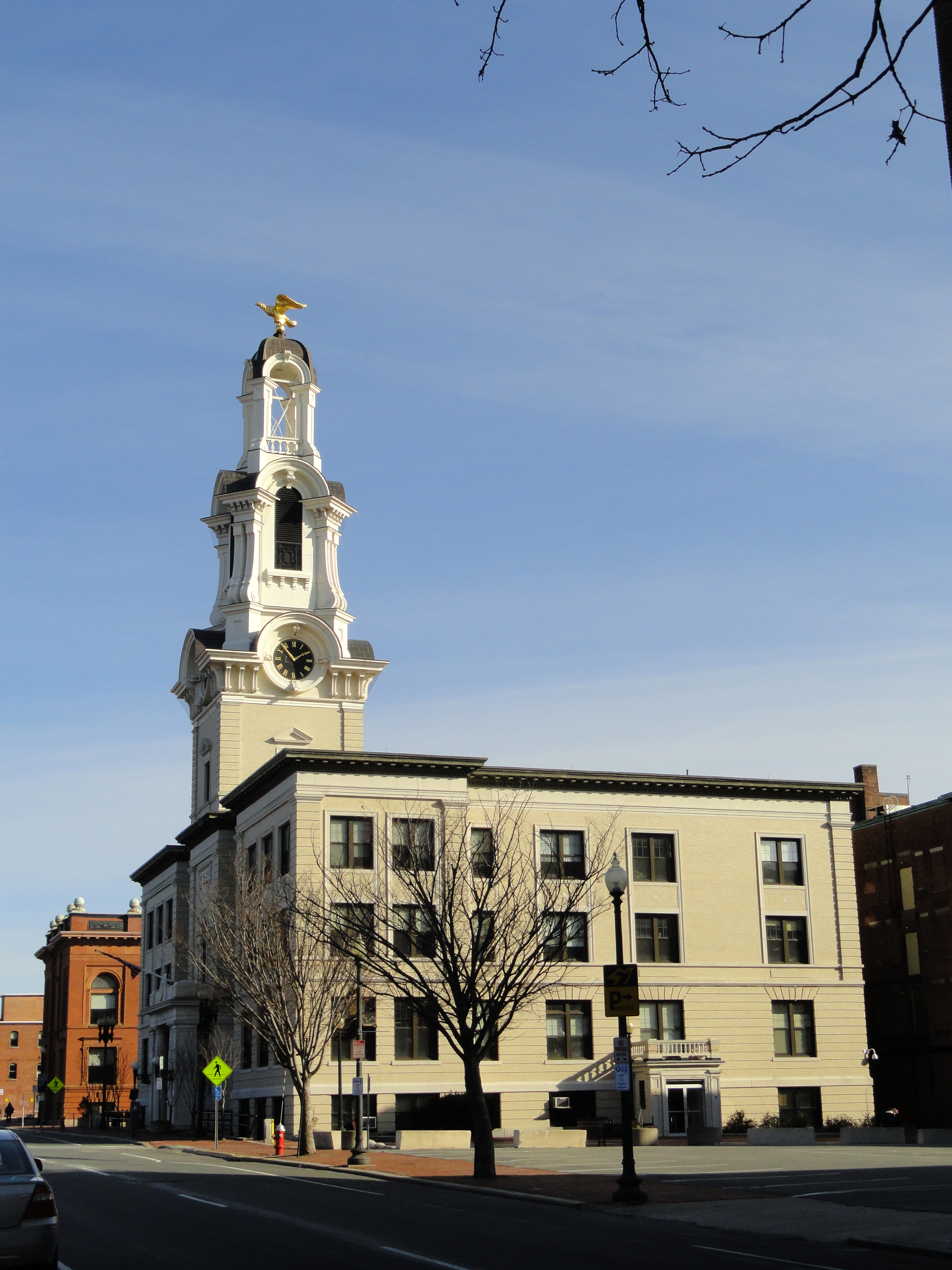
Lawrence City Hall, Lawrence, Massachusetts, 1923.
