= Bradlee School =

- U.S. National Register of Historic Places
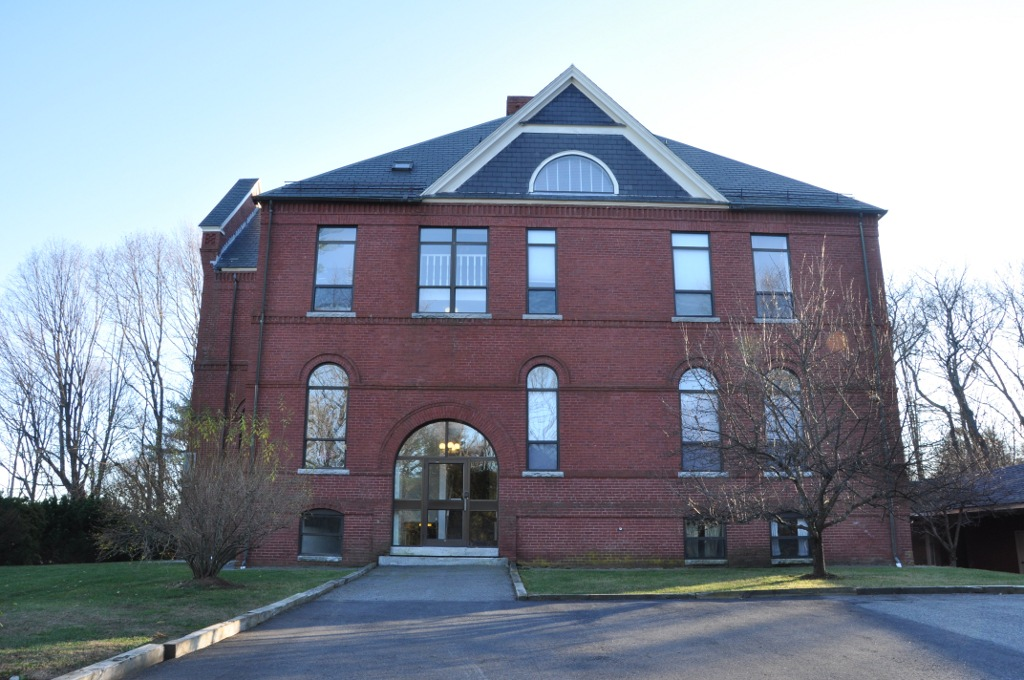

- Location within Massachusetts Location within the United States
- Location: Andover, Massachusetts
- Coordinates: 42°37′50″N 71°9′45″W
- Built: 1889; 137 years ago
- Architect: George G. Adams
- Architectural style: Queen Anne, Romanesque
- MPS: Town of Andover MRA
- NRHP reference No.: 82004829
- Added to NRHP: June 10, 1982; 44 years ago

The Bradlee School is a historic former school build at 147 Andover Street in the Ballardvale section of Andover, Massachusetts, United States. The school was built by the town in 1890, and is a fine period example of Queen Anne styling, with a tall hipped roof, rounded windows on the first floor, and decorative brick details. It was listed on the National Register of Historic Places in 1982.

== Description and history ==
The Bradlee School building is set high on a hill on the west side of Andover Street, overlooking the village of Ballardvale. It is a2-1/2 story red brick building, with a hip roof and an asymmetrically placed projecting gabled section at the traditional east-facing front. The building's massing is characteristic of the Queen Anne Period, with generally asymmetrical styling, and large gabled dormers on the sides. Its entrances (at the front and north side) are set in large round-arch openings, and the first-floor windows also have round arched tops. Belt courses of brickwork delineate the bases of the windows and the top of the rectangular portion of the windows. Second-floor windows are rectangular, with a belt course joining the granite lintels, and a corbelled cornice between the window tops and the roof. Gable ends have half-round windows at their centers.

The school was designed by Lawrence architect George G. Adams, and was completed in 1890. It was the town's first school to be supplied with water from a municipal supply. Originally called the Ballard Vale School, it was rededicated in 1894 to Joseph Bradlee, the principal proprietor of the Ballardvale Mills at the time. At the time of its listing on the National Register of Historic Places in 1982, the building stood vacant.

== See also ==
- National Register of Historic Places listings in Andover, Massachusetts
- National Register of Historic Places listings in Essex County, Massachusetts
