= Waterville Main Street Historic District =

Historic district in Maine, United States

- U.S. National Register of Historic Places
- U.S. Historic district
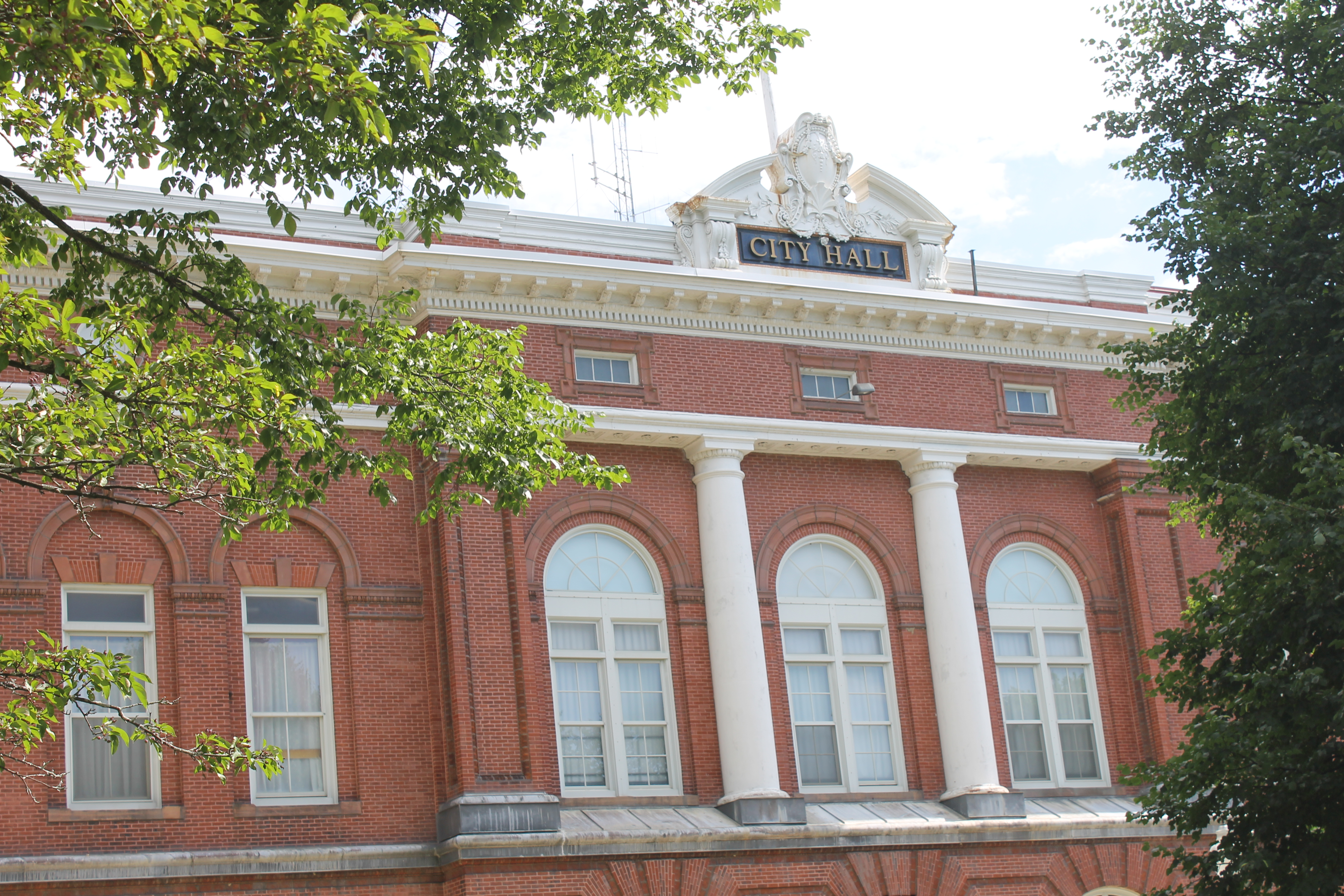

- Location within Maine Location within the United States
- Location: Roughly Main and Common Sts., Castonguay Sq.; also 129-179 Main & 13 Appleton Sts., Waterville, Maine
- Coordinates: 44°32′58″N 69°37′47″W
- Area: 5.9 acres (2.4 ha)
- Built: 1897
- NRHP reference No.: 12001066 (original); 16000675 (increase)

Significant dates
- Added to NRHP: December 19, 2012
- Boundary increase: September 27, 2016

The Waterville Main Street Historic District encompasses the best-preserved portions of the historical commercial downtown area of Waterville, Maine. Developed most intensively in the late 19th and early 20th centuries, this area was the center of commerce for Waterville and the surrounding rural communities. It encompasses 25 properties on Main and Common Streets, including the Waterville Opera House and City Hall. It was listed on the National Register of Historic Places in 2012, and was slightly enlarged in 2016.

== Description and history ==
The downtown area of Waterville is located on the west bank of the Kennebec River, about 20 miles (32 km) upstream from the city of Augusta, the river's highest point navigable by ocean-going vessels. Waterville developed as an industrial center in the second half of the 19th century, following the arrival of the railroad in 1849. Mills were built south of the downtown area, and residential areas grew to the north and west. The city's most rapid period of growth was between about 1890 and 1920, when many of the brick commercial buildings lining Main Street were built. Castonguay Square, a grassy park on the north side of Common Street and south of City Hall, was laid out in 1796, when the area was still part of Winslow. It is named for a soldier killed during World War I, and features a German cannon from that war, as well as a commemorative marker of Benedict Arnold's expedition to Quebec, which took place during the American Revolutionary War, when this area was largely undeveloped.

The district includes two blocks of Main Street, between Temple and Spring Streets, as well as Common Street and Castonguay Square. Most of the buildings in this area are commercial brick buildings, and most have fairly typical Late Victorian commercial styling. The Opera House and City Hall, a single building on the north side of Castonguay Square at the corner of Front Street, is a fine example of Colonial Revival architecture, and continues to serve the community as an entertainment venue and municipal center. The Krutzky Block, located at the southeast corner of Common and Main, is a distinctive small block with Spanish Revival and Arts and Crafts elements. The 1936 Federal Trust Company building (25-33 Main) is the district's only example of Art Deco architecture. The district's oldest building is the 1836 Ticonic Row (8-22 Main), which exhibits Greek Revival features overlaid by alterations made in the 1920s.

== See also ==
- National Register of Historic Places listings in Kennebec County, Maine
