= Montpelier City Hall =

Coordinates: 44.259183°N 72.575512°W

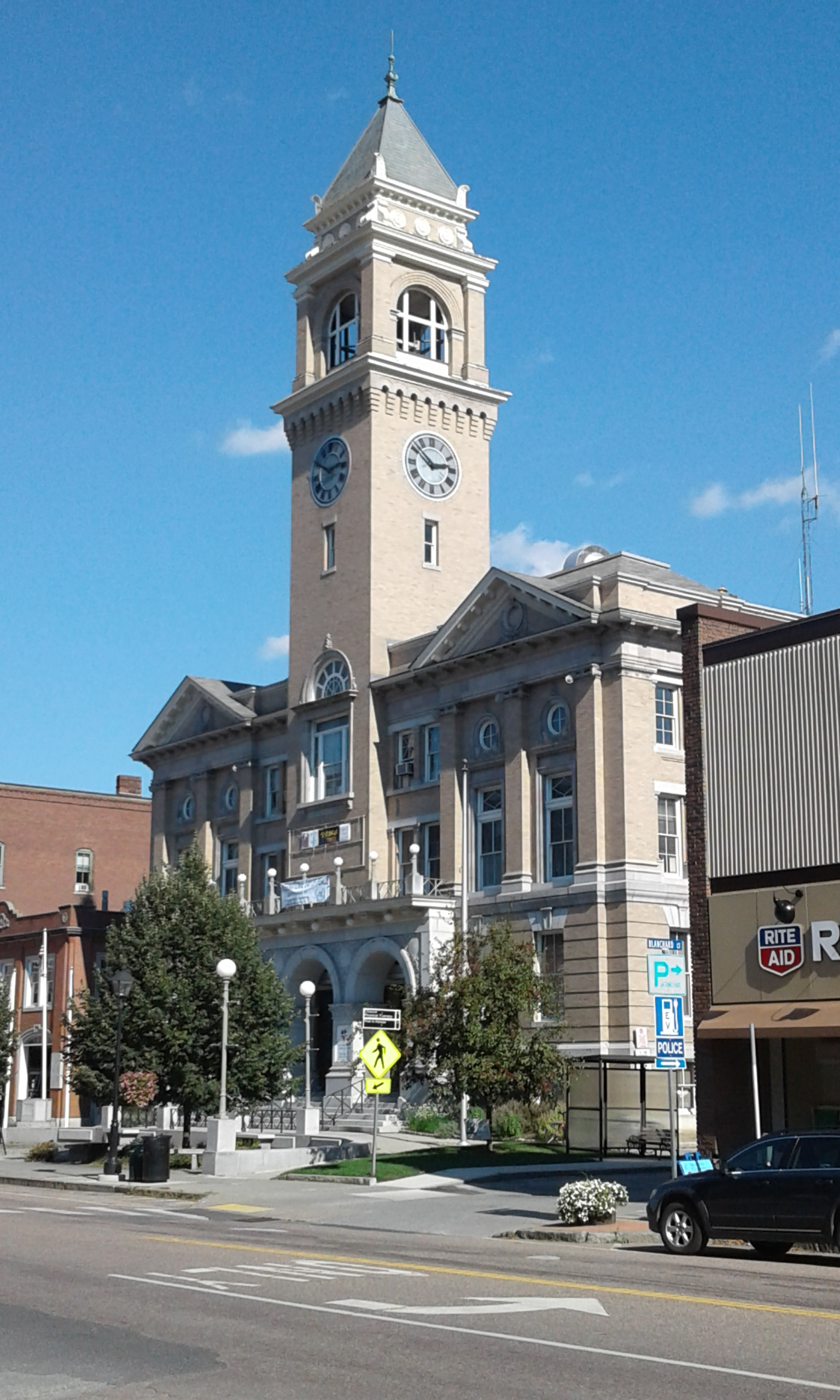
- Montpelier City Hall
- Interactive map of the Montpelier City Hall area

General information
- Location: 39 Main Street, Montpelier, VT
- Construction started: 1908
- Completed: 1909

Height
- Height: 150 ft (46 m)

Technical details
- Floor count: 4

Design and construction
- Architect: George G. Adams

Montpelier City Hall is located in Montpelier, Vermont, U.S. The building opened in 1909.

== See also ==
- List of tallest buildings in Vermont
