= Adams Memorial Building =

- U.S. National Register of Historic Places
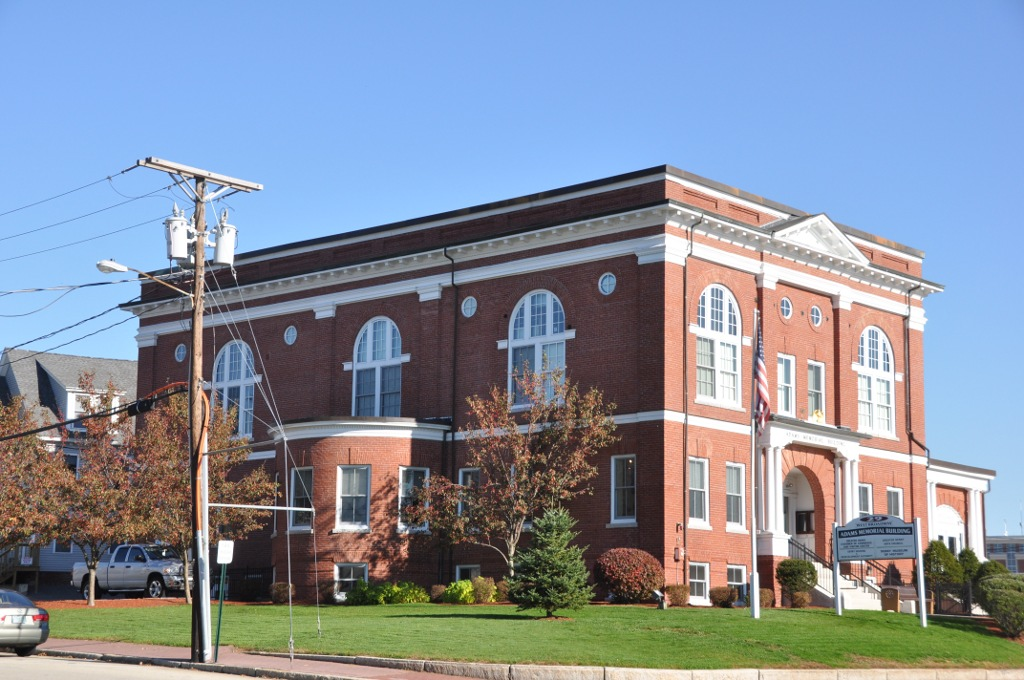

- Location within New Hampshire Location within the United States
- Location: 29 West Broadway, Derry, New Hampshire
- Coordinates: 42.88026°N 71.32828°W
- Area: less than one acre
- Built: 1904
- Architect: George G. Adams
- NRHP reference No.: 82001875
- Added to NRHP: January 11, 1982

The Adams Memorial Building, now also known as the Derry Opera House, is a historic municipal building at 29 West Broadway near the center of Derry, New Hampshire. Built in 1904, it is a remarkably sophisticated Colonial Revival structure for what was at the time a small community. The building originally housed a variety of municipal offices and the local library. Local events are occasionally held in the theater ("opera house") of the building, located on the upper level. It was listed on the National Register of Historic Places in 1982. The theater is now operated by a local nonprofit arts organization, the Greater Derry Arts Council.

== Description and history ==
The Adams Memorial Building stands near the west end of Derry's central business district, on the north side of West Broadway (New Hampshire Route 102) at its junction with Maple Street. It is a two-story masonry structure set on a raised basement, built out of brick with granite and wooden trim. Stone beltcourses separate the first and second floors, and the second floor and the elaborate roof cornice. The main facade is three bays wide, articulated by brick pilasters with stone capitals. The main entrance is in the center bay, recessed in a round arch framed by a projecting cornice supported by clustered columns. Upper level windows are set in large round-arch openings. On the left side, facing Maple Street, is a single-story single-bay round projecting section.

The building was designed by Lawrence, Massachusetts, architect George G. Adams, and completed in 1904. It originally housed a variety of municipal offices and the local library. Local events are occasionally held in the theater ("opera house") of the building, located on the upper level. The building is an unusually elaborate Colonial Revival structure for what was at the time a fairly small town (population c. 3,600 in 1920). It was twice damaged by fire (1914 and 1927), necessitating rebuilding of portions of its interior.

== See also ==
- National Register of Historic Places listings in Rockingham County, New Hampshire
