= Rochester Opera House =

Coordinates: 43°18′19″N 70°58′33″W

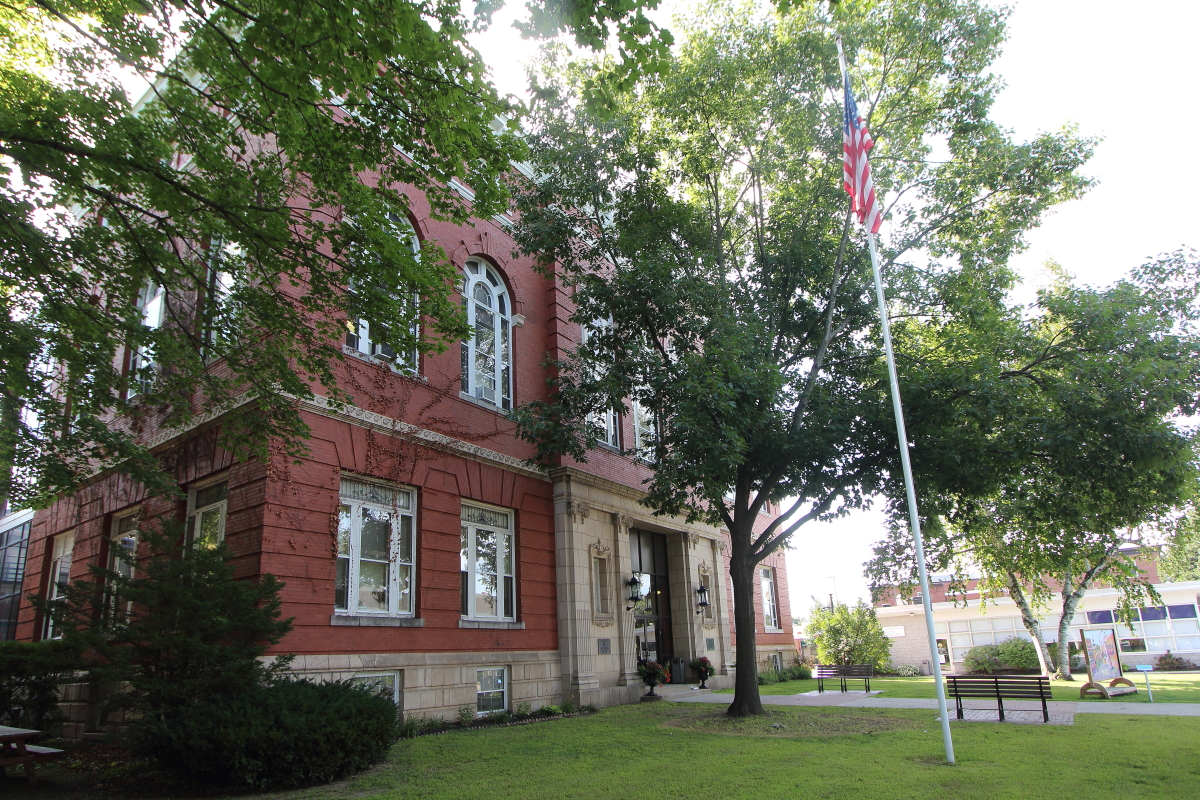
City Hall & Opera House, Rochester, NH

The Rochester Opera House is a 750-seat theater in the city hall of Rochester, a city in Strafford County, New Hampshire, United States. It has the unique architectural feature of a fully moveable floor, perhaps the last of this design in existence.

== History ==
The Rochester Opera House was built in 1908, designed by George G. Adams. Adams built six other municipal buildings for cities around New England, including Waterville, Maine, Dover, New Hampshire, and Derry, New Hampshire. Construction costing nearly $62,000, the Rochester Opera House accommodated 1,012 people and featured a grand proscenium, intricate stenciling, murals, and a suspended horseshoe balcony. One of its most interesting features was its unique moving floor system. The floor of the opera house can be lowered to become a flat surface and be used for dances, town hall meetings, etc. or raised to a tilt for viewing shows. Adams equipped four different buildings with this flooring system. However, due to fires and other events, the Rochester Opera House is the only known theater in the United States to still use this type of flooring. It is truly an architectural treasure.

Like most buildings, over time the Rochester Opera House started to deteriorate. Restoration plans for the opera house started in the mid 1980s fronted by the Rochester Heritage Trust and the Arts Rochester Organization. An early challenge facing these groups was to uncover and fully appreciate the mechanics present in the unique floor-moving system. Understanding such complexities was aided considerably by an extensive study finished in June 1985 by Nancy Alberto and Heidi Barrett, students of the Department of Civil Engineering at the nearby University of New Hampshire. Estimates for restoring the opera house and also establishing an endowment fund for maintenance and program scheduling ranged up to $1.2 million. Due to the enormity of the task and the size of the necessary costs, the first effort to restore the opera house only accomplished improvements to meet fire and safety codes, as well as much-needed audience amenities.

It took more than a decade for another attempt to be made to restore the opera house. In 1996, after Mayor Harvey Bernier Jr. took office, restoration continued. Restoration focused mostly on bringing the unique flooring back to working condition, restoring the original stenciling, and bringing the opera house back to its original state. After only an impressive eighteen months, with over $300,000 of donated money and goods (above what the city had already agreed to pay), and ten thousand hours of volunteer labor, the Rochester Opera House restoration was completed. Following nearly a quarter century of dormancy, the opera house reopened its doors to the public in 1997.

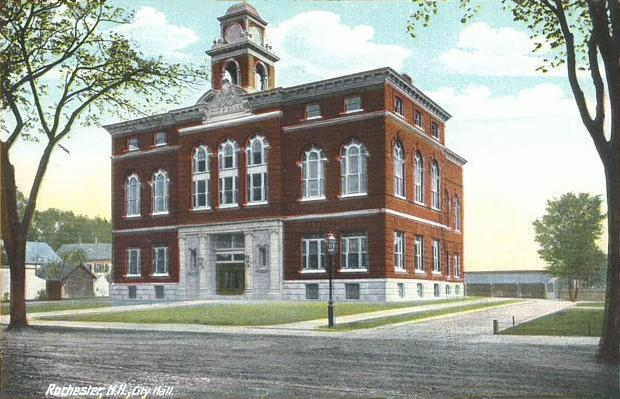
Rochester City hall and Opera House

== Current activities ==
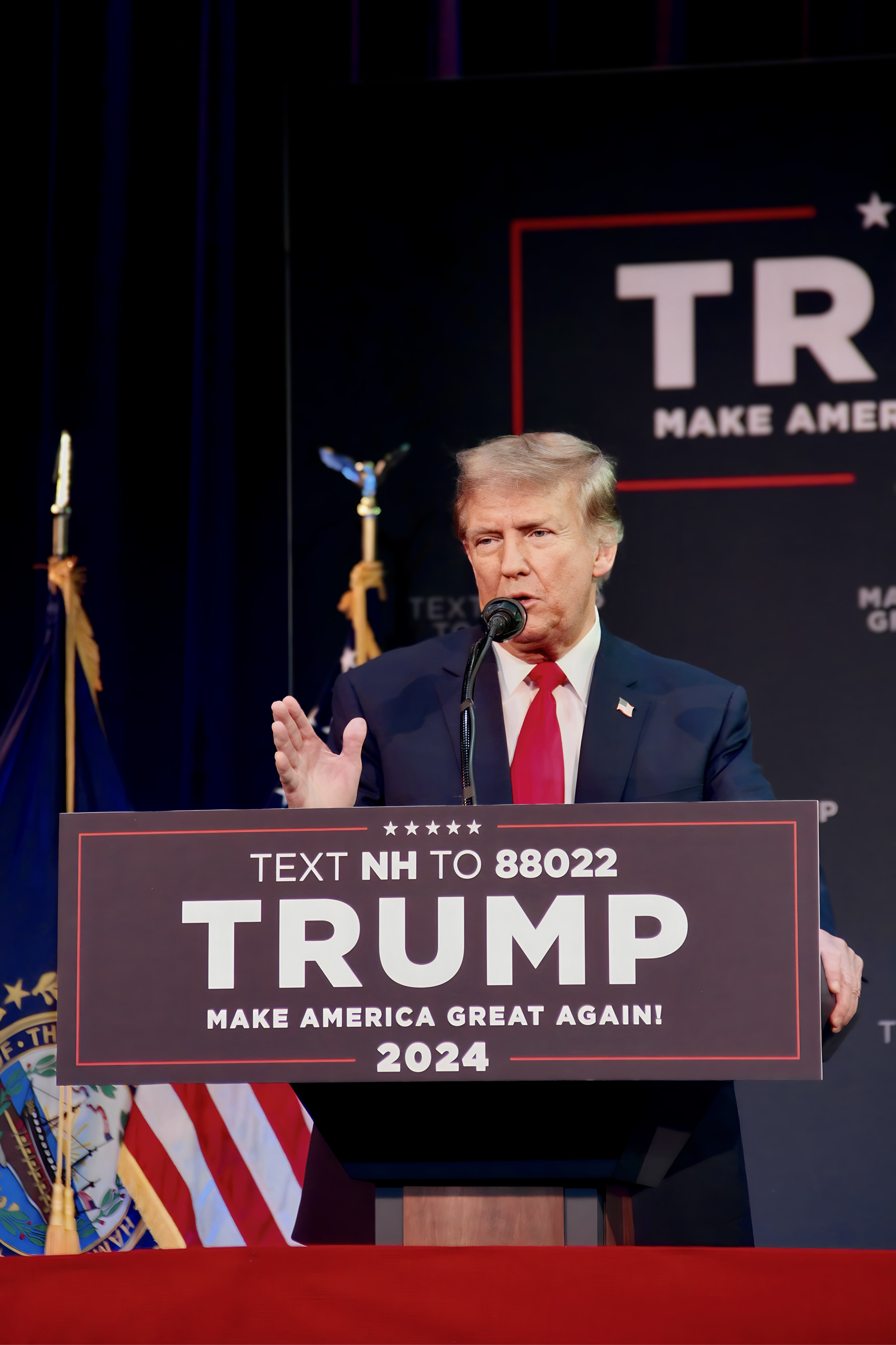
Trump speaking at a campaign rally in January 2024

The Rochester Opera House is a very important architectural and historical building. While also housing the city hall, it has been a vital part of most all the important historical moments in Rochester, New Hampshire. To this day, it is still a center for politics and entertainment in the community.

As well as being an important building for entertainment in Rochester, the Rochester Opera House is a hub for political activity in the city. The opera house has hosted speeches by numerous politicians and famous individuals including Pete Buttigieg, Barack Obama, John McCain, Bill and Hillary Clinton, and Donald Trump.

After celebrating its 100th anniversary in 2008, the Rochester Opera House is still in operation today. Restored to look like it did over ninety years ago, the opera house offers the visitor a unique viewing experience.
