= Stevens Memorial Hall =

- U.S. National Register of Historic Places
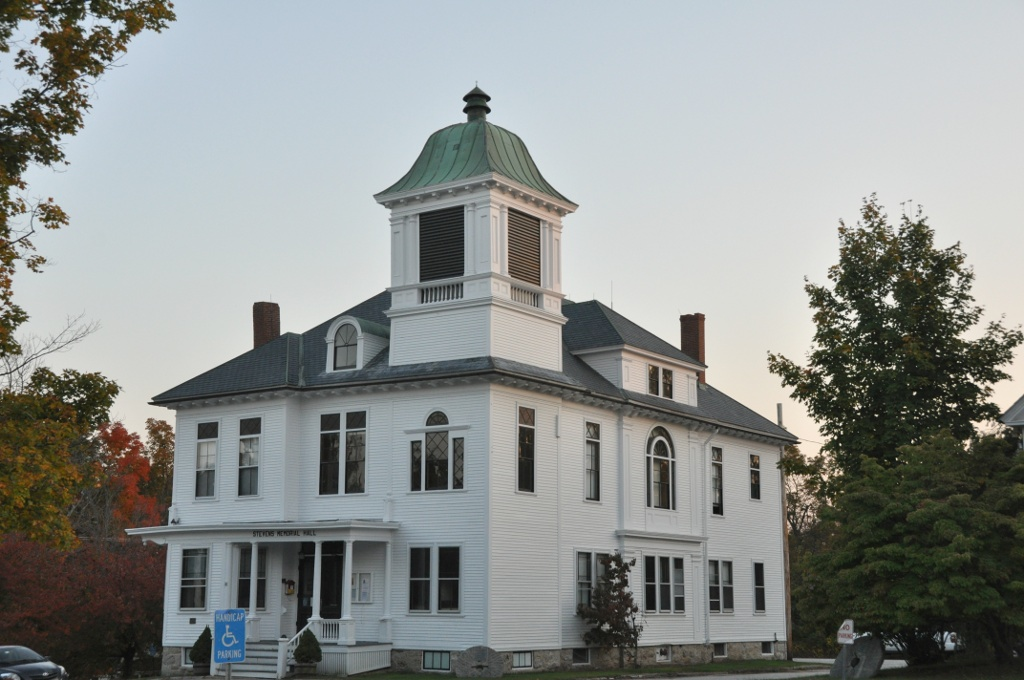

- Location within New Hampshire Location within the United States
- Location: 1 Chester St., Chester, New Hampshire
- Coordinates: 42°57′25″N 71°15′29″W
- Area: 1 acre (0.40 ha)
- Built: 1908
- Architect: George G. Adams
- Architectural style: Queen Anne
- NRHP reference No.: 04000963
- Added to NRHP: September 10, 2004

Stevens Memorial Hall is the historic town hall of Chester, New Hampshire. The building, a large wood-frame structure completed in 1910, is located in the center of Chester at the junction of New Hampshire Routes 121 and 102. The building was listed on the National Register of Historic Places in 2004. It served as the center of the town's civic business until 2000, when town offices were relocated to a former school.

== Description and history ==
Stevens Memorial Hall occupies a prominent site at the southwest corner of New Hampshire Routes 121 and 102. It is a large two-story wood-frame structure that is basically Colonial Revival in style, with some Queen Anne touches. It is covered by a hip roof, with a square belfry at the northwest corner, covered by a bellcast roof. The main facade is divided into three sections, with an asymmetrical arrangement of windows, and a center entrance sheltered by a porch supported by slender round columns mounted on square bases. The inside ground floor historically housed town offices. The basement level, originally unfinished, was adapted for use as a police station in the 1970s. The upper floor consists of a large auditorium space used for civic and social functions, with a stage, dressing room, and balcony.

The hall was designed by Lawrence, Massachusetts, architect George G. Adams, and was built over a three-year period. It was formally dedicated in 1910, and was retired from town functions in 2000. It is the only purpose-built town hall in the town, with its civic functions now located in a former elementary school at the western end of the Chester Center village. From 1930 to 1981, this building also housed the Chester Free Library. The auditorium space, in addition to being used for town meetings until 2000, was used for local community group meetings, theatrical productions, and other civic events.

== See also ==
- National Register of Historic Places listings in Rockingham County, New Hampshire
