= Old Public Library =

- U.S. National Register of Historic Places
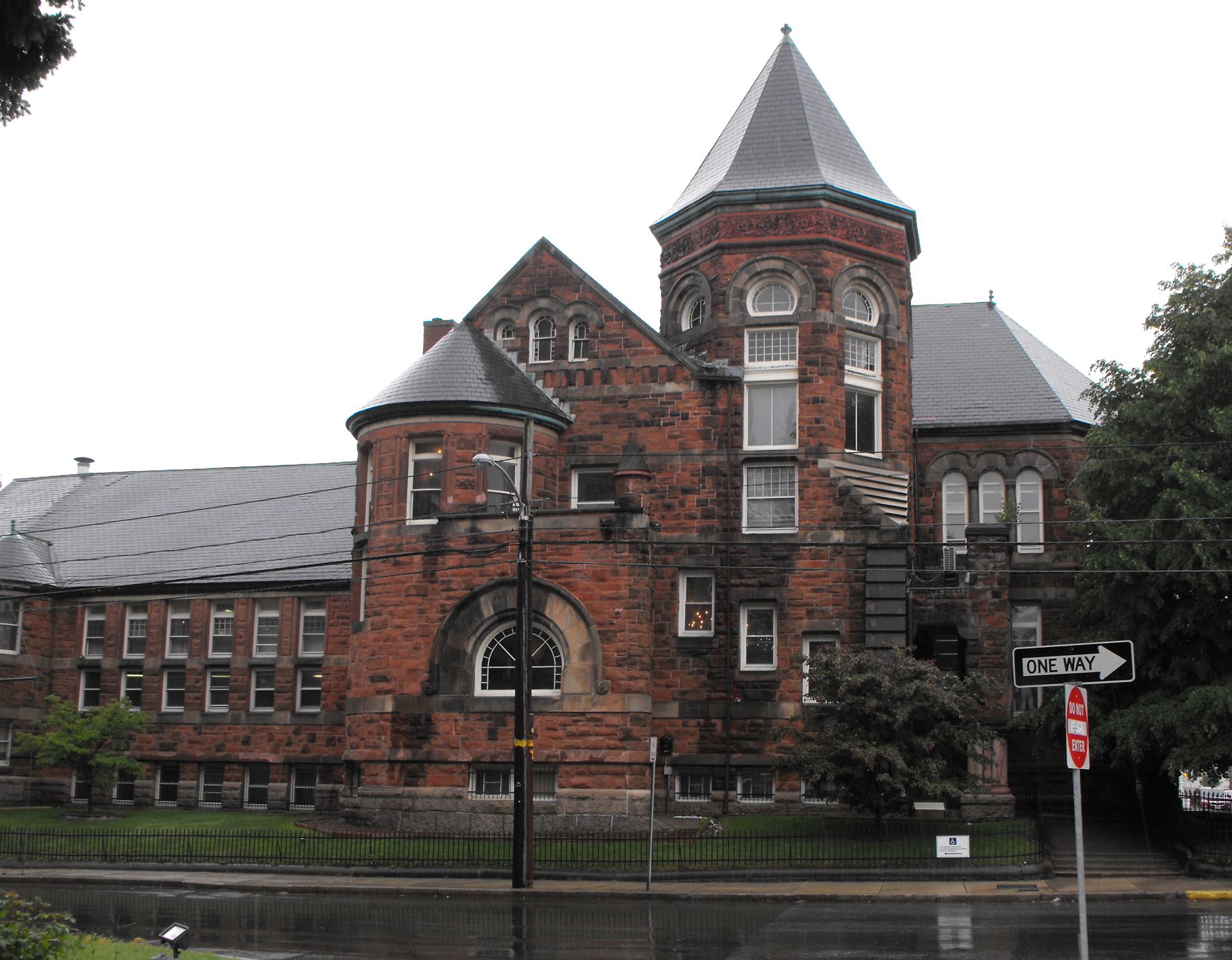

- Location within Massachusetts Location within the United States
- Location: 190 Hampshire St., Lawrence, Massachusetts
- Coordinates: 42°42′34″N 71°10′5″W
- Built: 1890
- Architect: George G. Adams
- Architectural style: Romanesque
- NRHP reference No.: 78000452
- Added to NRHP: November 28, 1978

The Old Public Library is a historic library building in Lawrence, Massachusetts. The Richardsonian Romanesque structure was built in 1892 to a design by George G. Adams, a leading architect of public buildings in New England. The building is predominantly brownstone, with terracotta trim bands, an irregular and asymmetric massing with a tower, and its entrance recessed in an archway. It served as Lawrence's public library until 1973 when a new library building was built.

The building was listed on the National Register of Historic Places in 1978.

== See also ==
- National Register of Historic Places listings in Lawrence, Massachusetts
- National Register of Historic Places listings in Essex County, Massachusetts
