= John R. Rollins School =

- U.S. National Register of Historic Places
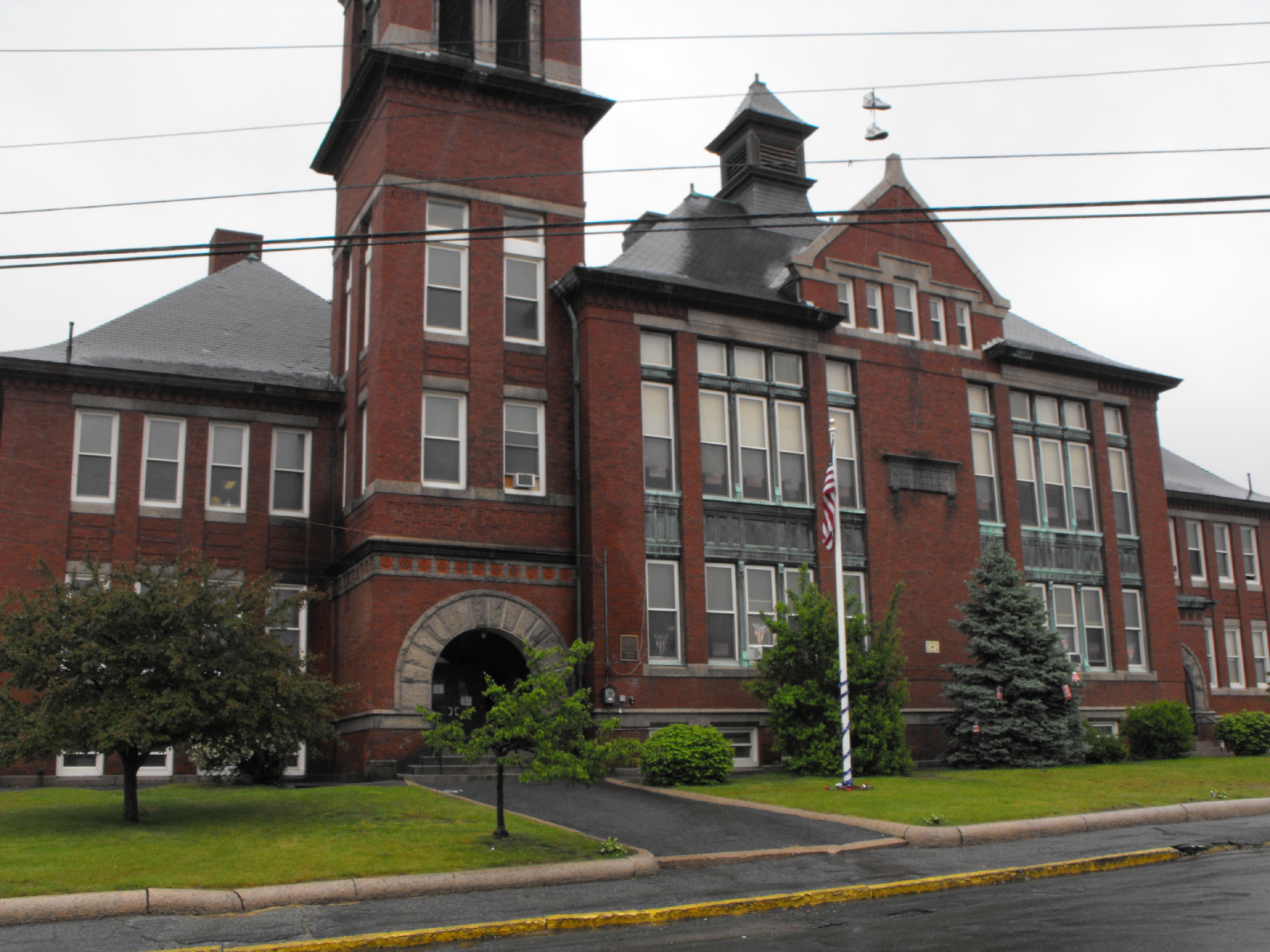

- Location within Massachusetts Location within the United States
- Location: Lawrence, Massachusetts
- Coordinates: 42°42′51″N 71°08′55″W
- Built: 1892
- Architect: George G. Adams
- Architectural style: Romanesque
- NRHP reference No.: 00000956
- Added to NRHP: August 10, 2000

The John R. Rollins School is a historic school at 451 Howard Street in Lawrence, Massachusetts. The three-story brick structure was built in 1892 in the Richardsonian Romanesque style, and is a prominent feature of the Prospect Hill neighborhood, visible from nearby Interstate 495. It is named for John Rodman Rollins (1817-1892), a local politician who served both as mayor and superintendent of schools.

The building was listed on the National Register of Historic Places in 2000. It is still in use as a school.

== See also ==
- National Register of Historic Places listings in Lawrence, Massachusetts
- National Register of Historic Places listings in Essex County, Massachusetts
