= Lawrence Public Library (Massachusetts) =

Library building

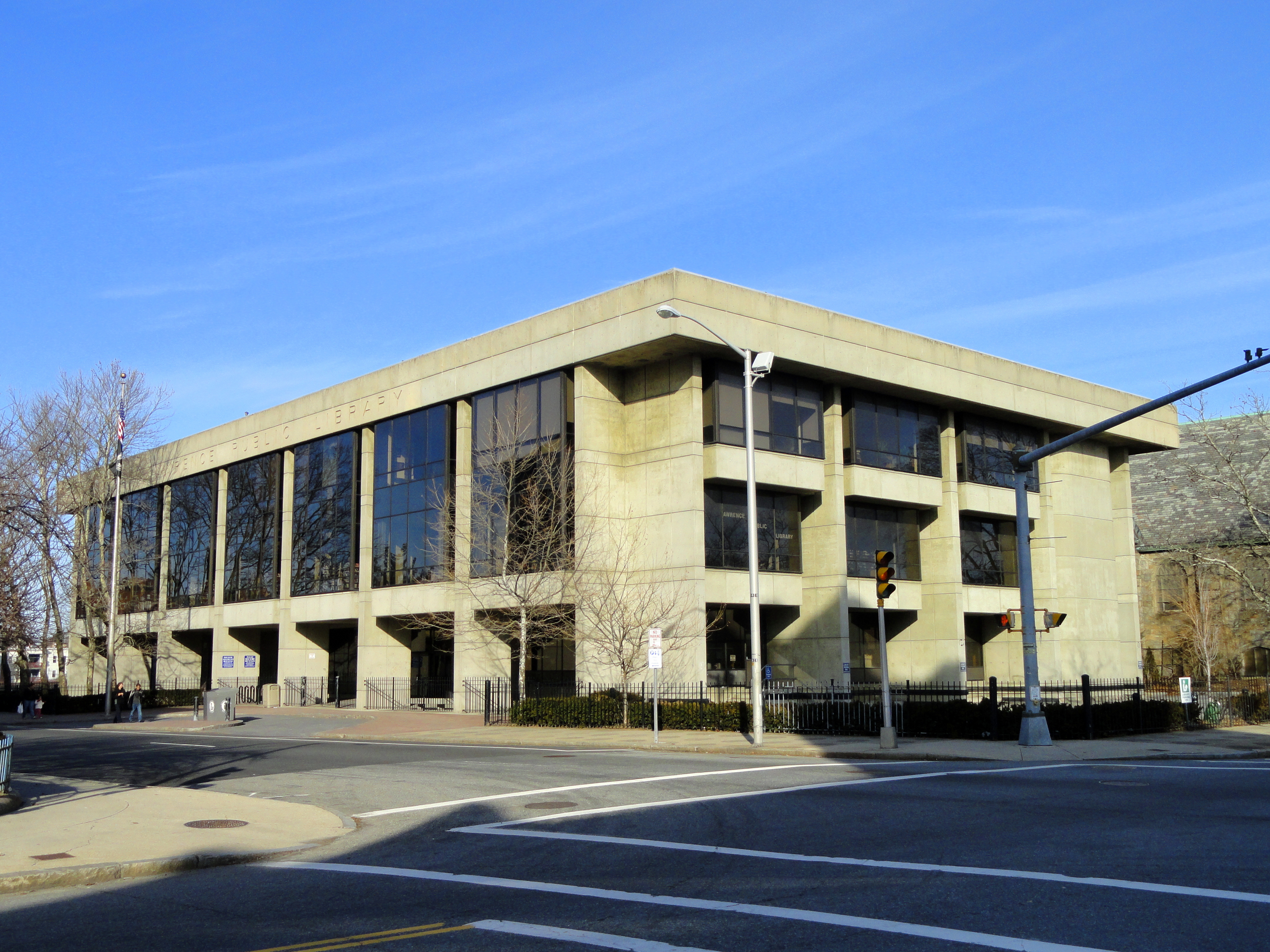
- Location: 51 Lawrence Street; Lawrence, Massachusetts 01841, United States
- Type: Public
- Established: 1847

Collection
- Size: ~100,000

Other information
- Website: www.lawrencefreelibrary.org

The Lawrence Public Library is a public library located in Lawrence, Massachusetts. It serves the City of Lawrence, and, through its membership in the Merrimac Valley Library Consortium (MVLC), all of the citizens of the MVLC multi-municipality regional library system. It is governed by a board of trustees consisting of seven members. The library was first opened to the public as a Free Public Library in 1892. The original library building was designed by George G. Adams and is located at the corner of Hampshire and Haverill streets.

== Main Library Building ==
The current Main Library Building, at the corner of Lawrence and Haverhill Streets, was completed in 1973. It was designed by the Cambridge, Massachusetts architectural firm of Henneberg & Henneberg, and is considered a typical example of the Modernist Brutalist architecture style.

== See also ==
- List of brutalist structures
