= Randall Library =

Coordinates: 42°26′13″N 71°30′17″W

Randall Memorial Library
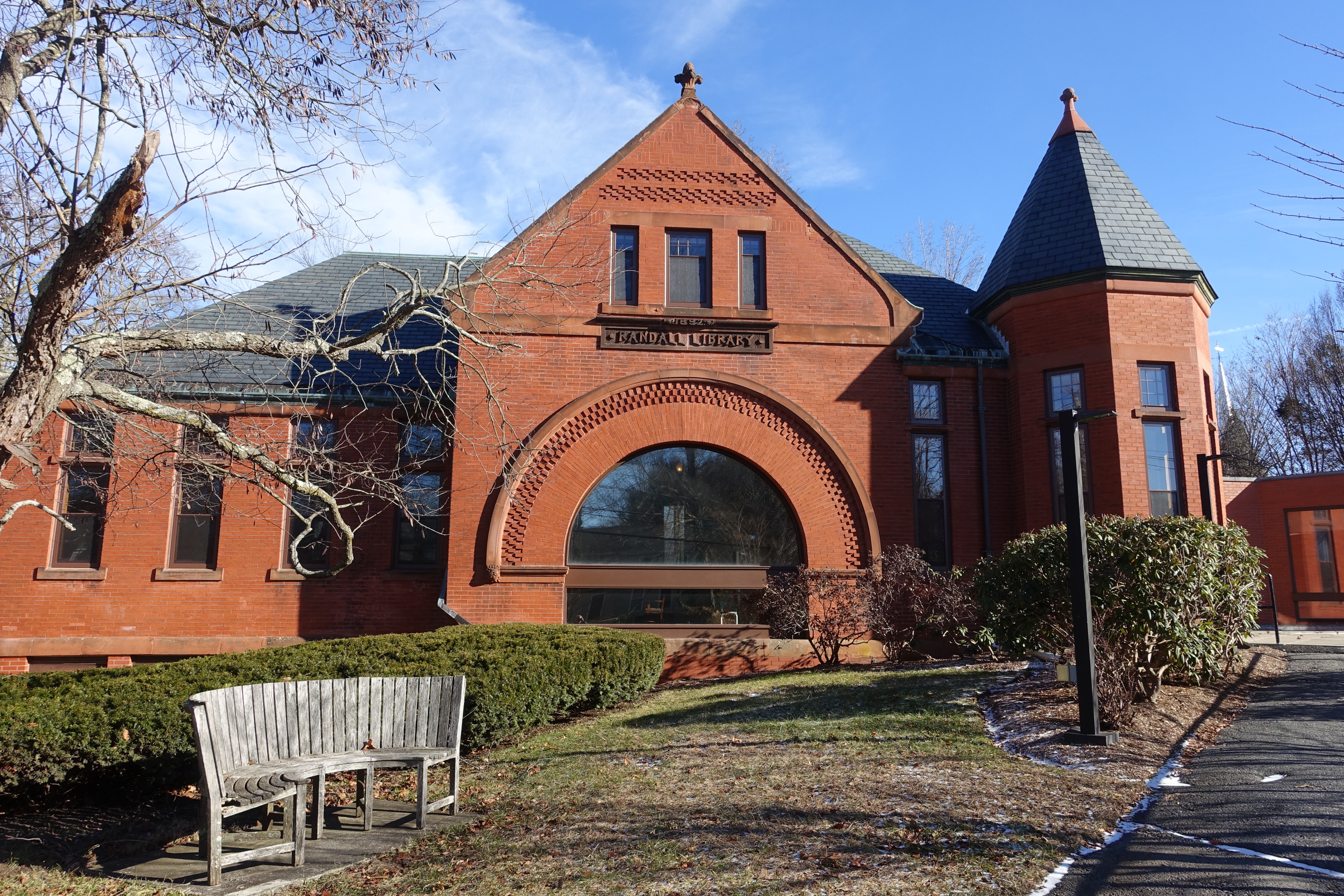
- Randall Library in 2018
- Location: Stow, Massachusetts, United States of America
- Type: Public Library
- Established: 1851
- Architect: George G. Adams
- Branches: 1

Access and use
- Population served: 7,174 (2020 census)

Other information
- Website: www.stow-ma.gov/282/Randall-Library

The Randall Library is a public library in Stow, Massachusetts. The library is part of the Minuteman Library Network.

== Early history ==
John Witt Randall, a poet and naturalist who inherited a family farm in Stow, died without a will in 1892. His sister, Belinda Lull Randall, inherited his estate. She donated $25,000 to the town of Stow for the construction of a new library building. The library was built in 1893 and dedicated in February 1894 as the Randall Library.

== Architecture ==
The library building was designed by the architect George G. Adams in the Richardsonian Romanesque style and built in 1893 by the contractor, A. P. Powers. A large addition was built in 1976. In 2021, town voters passed a major renovation project to demolish and rebuild the 1976 addition and restore parts of the historic 1800s section of the library. The library had a soft re-open in March 2026 and a grand re-opening in May, 2026.

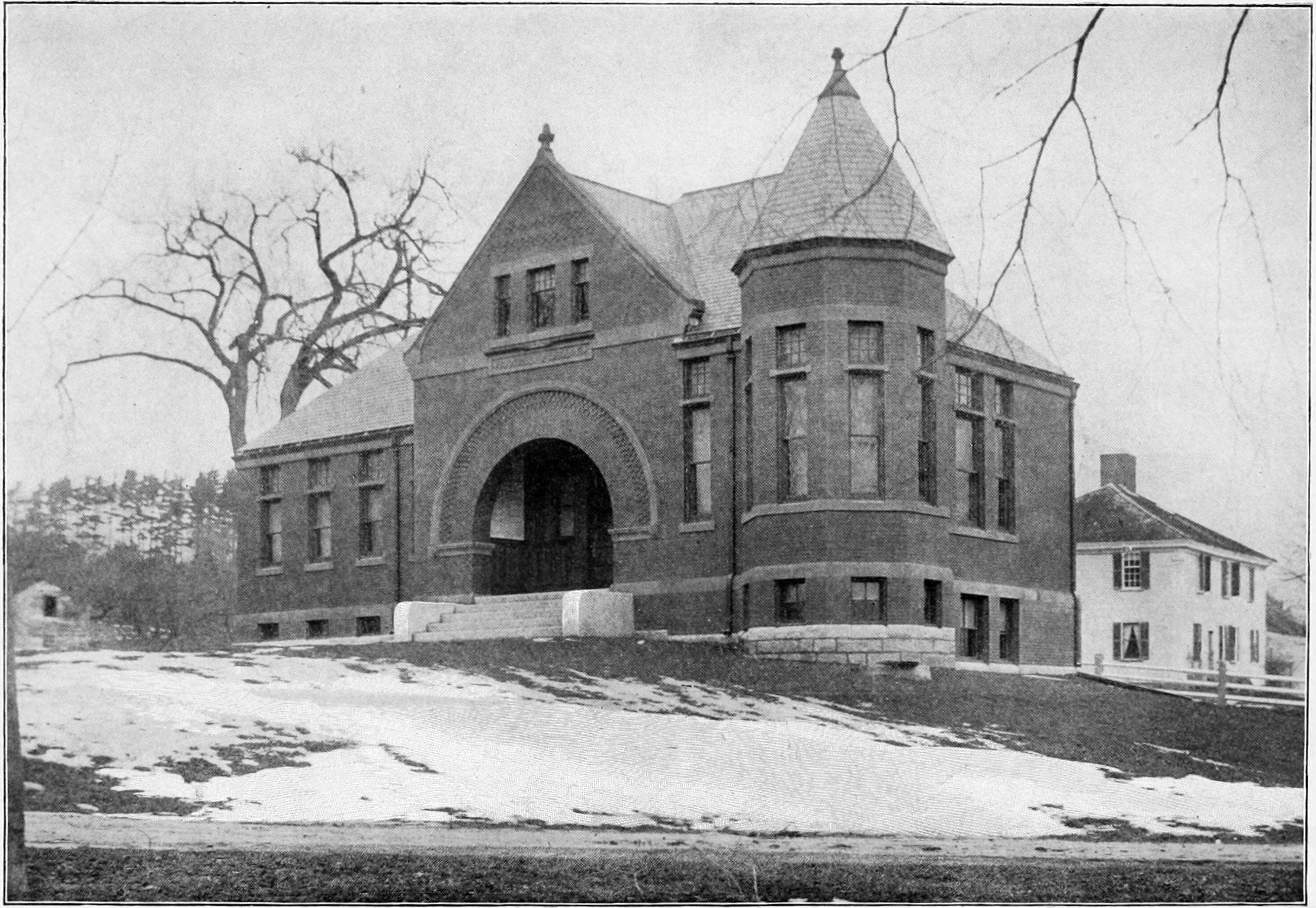
Structure before the 1976 addition

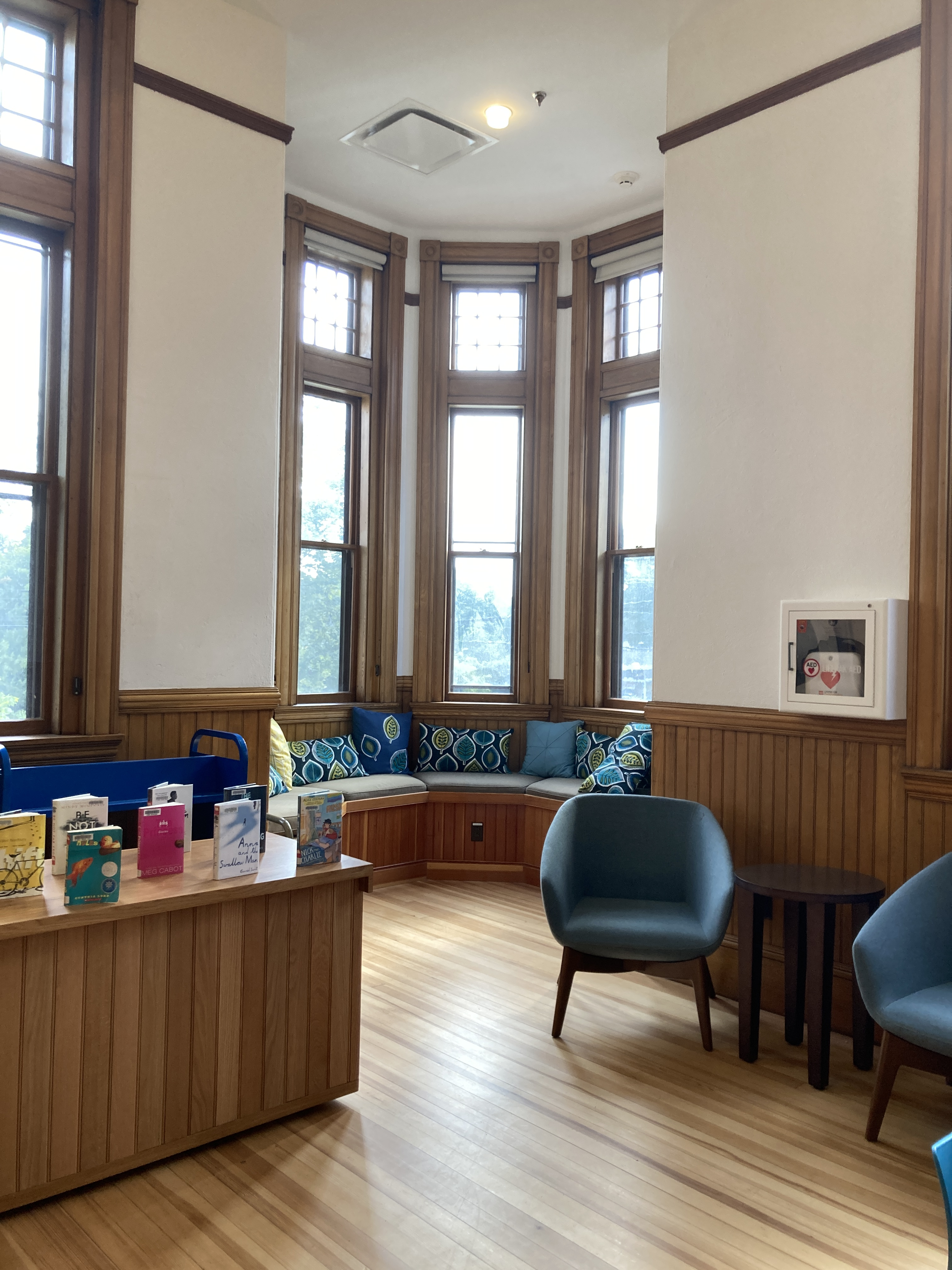
A reading nook in the renovated Randall Library, 2026

== See also ==
- John Witt Randall
