= High Service Water Tower and Reservoir =

- U.S. National Register of Historic Places
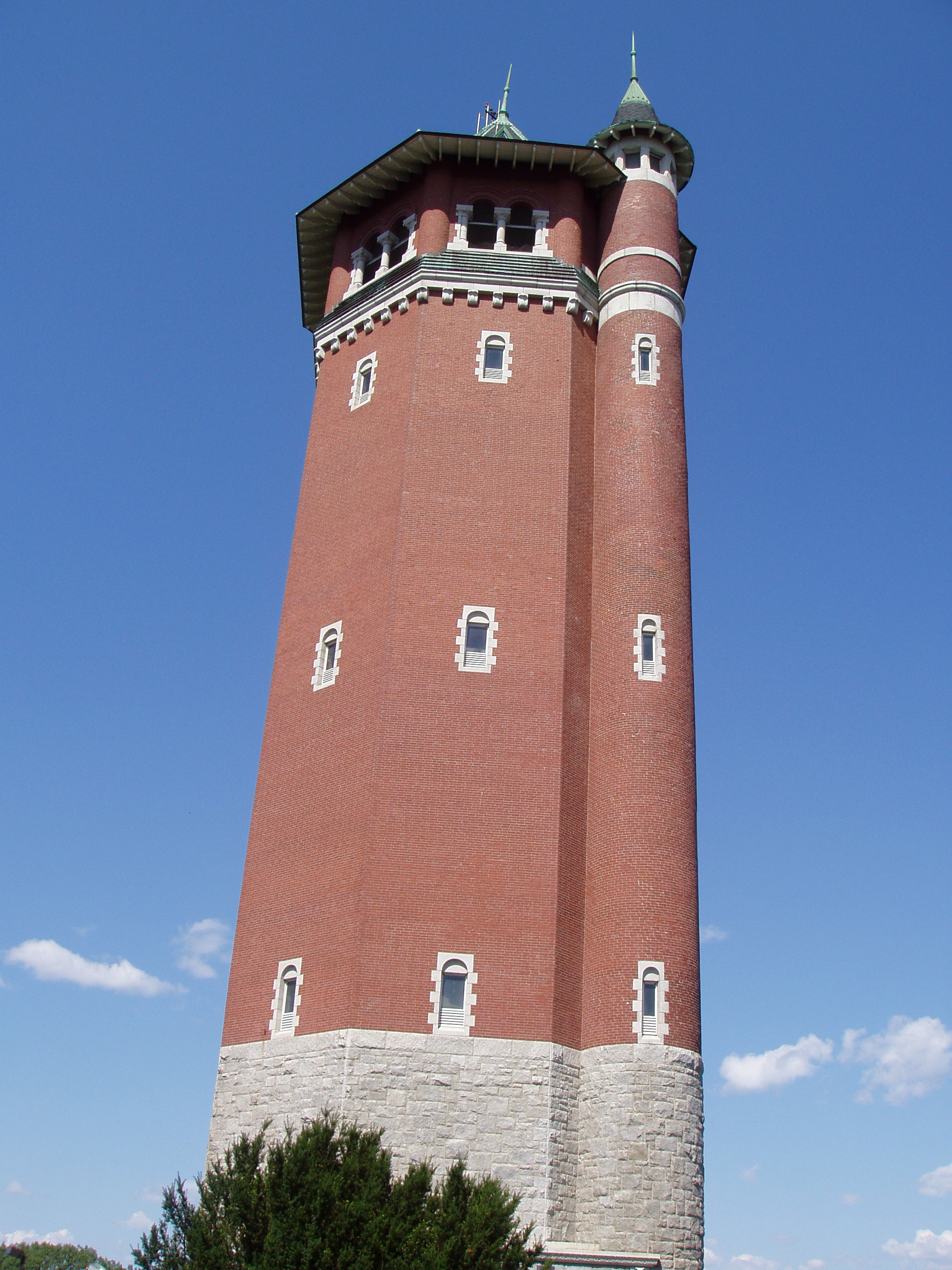

- Location within Massachusetts Location within the United States
- Location: Lawrence, Massachusetts
- Coordinates: 42°42′26″N 71°11′1″W
- Built: 1896
- Architect: Charles T. Emerson; George G. Adams; Albert F. Noyes
- Architectural style: Italianate, Romanesque
- NRHP reference No.: 78000450
- Added to NRHP: November 20, 1978

The High Service Water Tower and Reservoir, colloquially known as the Tower Hill Tower, is a public water supply facility off Massachusetts Route 110 in Lawrence, Massachusetts. The reservoir was constructed in 1874–75 to provide the city's public water supply, with a gatehouse designed by Charles T. Emerson, a Lawrence architect. The tower was built in 1896 as a high pressure standpipe or water tower. The tower stands 157 feet (48 m) high, and is built out of red brick with granite trim. It is Romanesque in its style, and was designed by George G. Adams, a noted local architect who had been taught by Emerson. The standpipe inside the tower is of steel construction and is 102 feet (31 m) in height. The area above the standpipe includes a balcony capped by a chateauesque roof, with round-arch windows providing views of the area. The main tower is octagonal in shape, with a narrow round staircase tower projection from one side.

The neighborhood surrounding the tower, located on the north-west side of Lawrence is known as Tower Hill, for obvious reasons. Although the hill and its accompanying neighborhood are associated with Lawrence, and the tower itself is located in, a small sliver of Tower Hill actually extends into the neighboring city of Methuen. Thus, it is sometimes necessary to clarify whether one is speaking of Tower Hill, Methuen or Tower Hill, Lawrence.

The tower and reservoir were listed on the National Register of Historic Places in 1978.

== See also ==
- National Register of Historic Places listings in Lawrence, Massachusetts
- National Register of Historic Places listings in Essex County, Massachusetts
