= Ballardvale District =

Historic district in Massachusetts, United States

- U.S. National Register of Historic Places
- U.S. Historic district
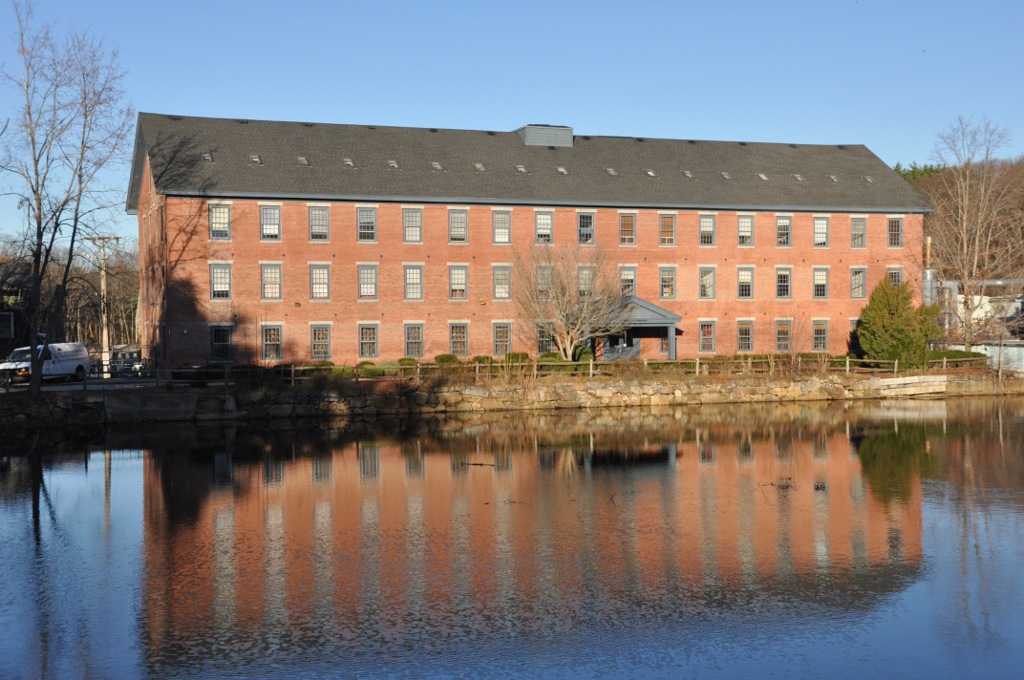

- Location within Massachusetts Location within the United States
- Location: Andover, Massachusetts
- Coordinates: 42°37′33″N 71°9′34″W
- Built: 1836
- Architect: Chickering, Jacob
- Architectural style: Mid 19th Century Revival, Early Republic
- MPS: Town of Andover MRA
- NRHP reference No.: 82000477
- Added to NRHP: October 7, 1982

The Ballardvale District in Andover, Massachusetts, encompasses the historic mill village of Ballardvale in the northwestern part of the town. It is centered on the crossing the Shawsheen River by Andover Street, and includes buildings on High Street, Center Street, and other adjacent roads on both sides of the river. The district was listed on the National Register of Historic Places in 1982.

Ballardvale was the first planned mill community in Andover. John and William Marland were the principal investors in the Ballardvale Manufacturing Company, under whose auspices the area was developed. It was named for Timothy Ballard, who had previously operated a sawmill and gristmill at the mill location set up by the Marlands. For about 100 years between 1835 and 1935 there was a remarkably self-contained community here: in addition to the mills, it included shops, churches, a school, and a railroad station.

The Marlands owned about 50 acres (20 ha) of land which was developed for the community. Much of the housing was relatively modest cottages on small lots, with popular styling details of the time. Many of them were built by locally notable builder Jacob Chickering. One typical house is at 36-40 Center Street: it is a four-family 2 1/2-story wood-frame house with minimal Italianate styling.

There are four major mill structures that survive. The oldest building, dating to 1836, is a four-story brick construction with granite trim. A wooden mill building (1844) stands adjacent, and there are additional buildings in the complex that were built later in the 19th century. One other notable structure is a c. 1872 wrought iron truss bridge that crosses the river below the mill complex.

== See also ==
- National Register of Historic Places listings in Andover, Massachusetts
- National Register of Historic Places listings in Essex County, Massachusetts
- Ballardvale, Massachusetts
