= Waterville Opera House and City Hall =

- U.S. National Register of Historic Places
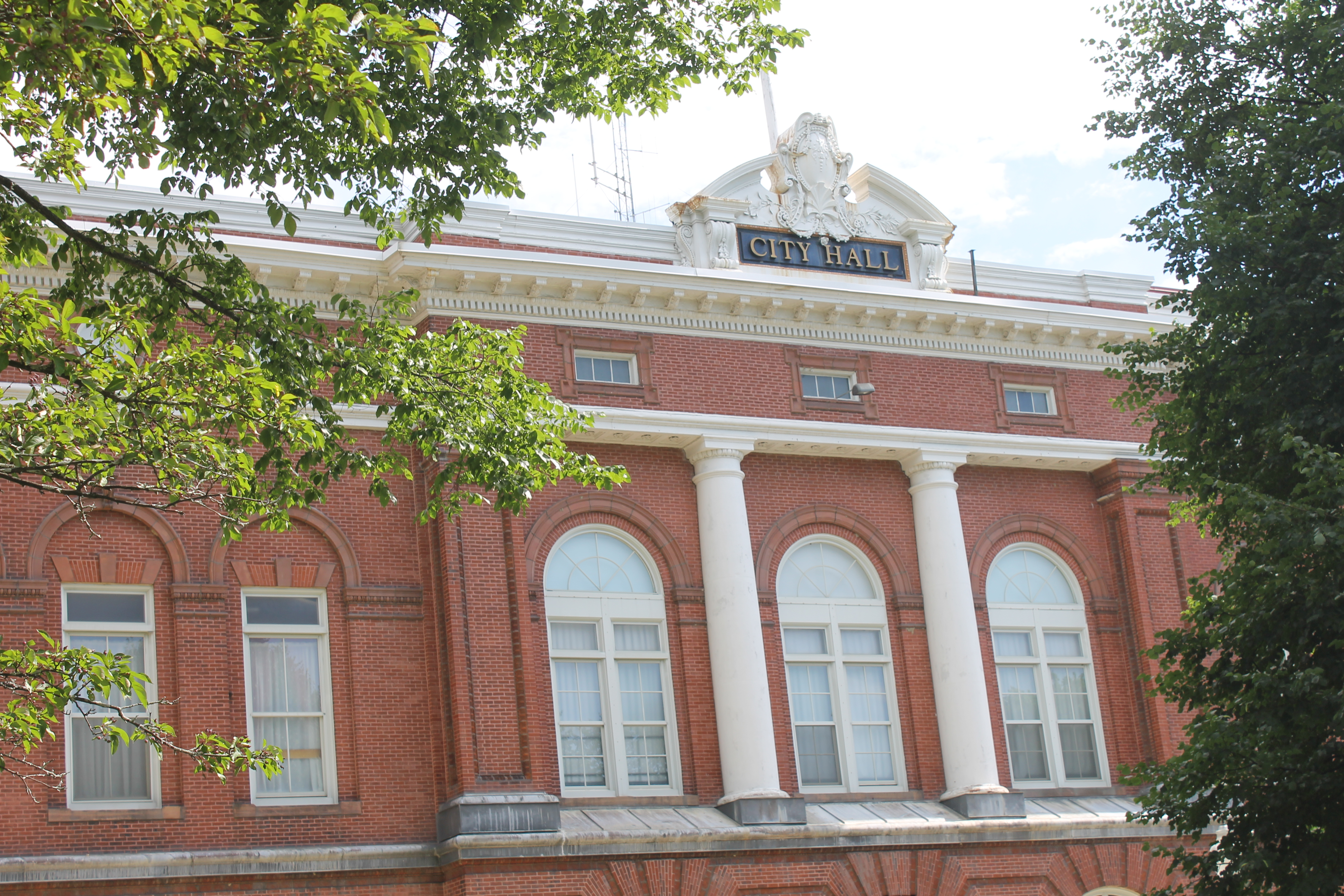

- Location within Maine Location within the United States
- Location: Castonguay Sq., Waterville, Maine
- Coordinates: 44°32′59″N 69°37′47″W
- Area: 2 acres (0.81 ha)
- Built: 1897
- Architect: Adams, George G.
- Architectural style: Colonial Revival
- NRHP reference No.: 76000097
- Added to NRHP: January 1, 1976

The Waterville Opera House and City Hall is a historic civic building at Castonguay Square (Common and Front Streets) in downtown Waterville, Maine. Built at the turn of the 20th century, it is one of a small number of multifunction civic buildings, housing both a live performance venue and municipal facilities, functions it continues to perform today. It was listed on the National Register of Historic Places in 1976.

== Description and history ==
The Waterville Opera House and City Hall stands in downtown Waterville, at the northwest corner of Common and Front Streets. Its main facade faces south, and is separated from Common Street by a parking area and Castonguay Square, which extends on the north side of Common Street between Main and Front Streets. The hall is a large three-story brick building with Colonial Revival styling. The main facade is nine bays wide, with the center three projecting slightly. The municipal offices are accessed via an entrance at the center of the projecting, set recessed in a round-arch opening and flanked by windows in similar openings, with access gained by a flights of side-facing stairs due to an elevated basement. Second-floor windows are tall and have rounded tops, while the third floor has very short windows. Stone stringcourses separate the granite basement from the first floor, and the first from the second. The opera house is accessed via an entrance on the building's west side. The building interior houses municipal offices in the basement and first floor, while the upper levels are taken up by the facilities of the opera house, which include a lobby, large auditorium, and backstage area. The auditorium features original period Baroque plasterwork, and a painted curtain.

The building is a fine example of a somewhat common trend in Maine's municipalities at the turn of the 20th century, the construction of a multipurpose building housing both city offices and a performance and meeting venue. This hall was designed by George G. Adams of Lawrence, Massachusetts, and was built between 1898 and 1902. It has hosted local functions including amateur theatrical productions, as well as touring theatrical productions. After World War II it became popular as a movie venue, but has recently seen a resurgence of interest in live events.

== See also ==
- National Register of Historic Places listings in Kennebec County, Maine
