= Arlington–Basswood Historic District =

Historic district in Massachusetts, United States

- U.S. National Register of Historic Places
- U.S. Historic district
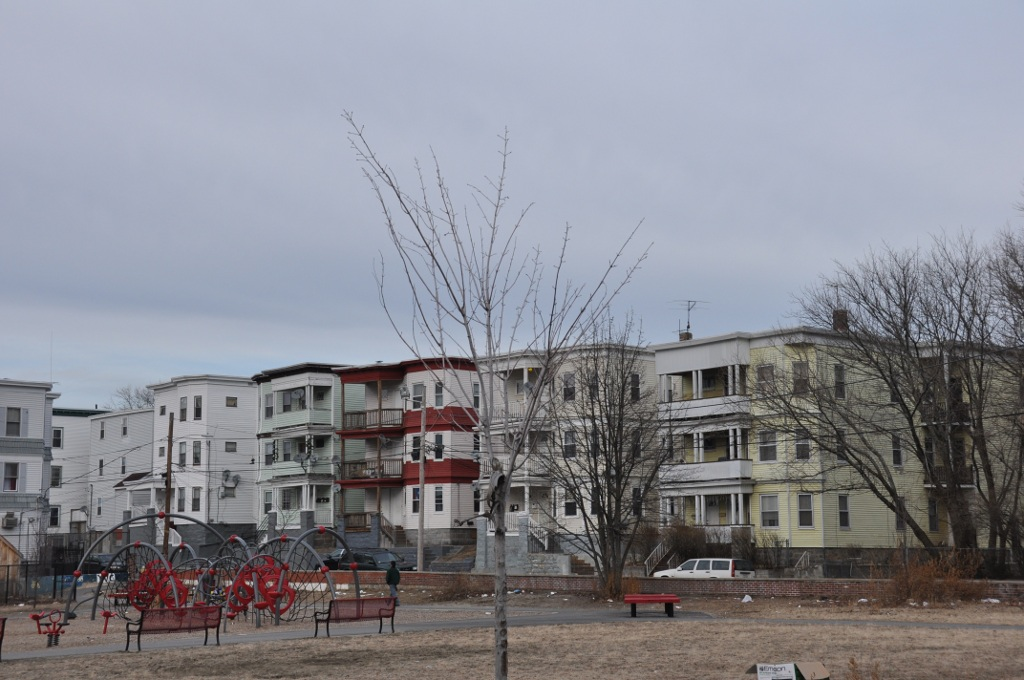
- A row of three-decker houses typical of the district

- Location within Massachusetts Location within the United States
- Location: Lawrence, Massachusetts
- Coordinates: 42°43′8″N 71°10′11″W
- Built: 1909
- Architectural style: Classical Revival
- NRHP reference No.: 84000406
- Added to NRHP: November 13, 1984

The Arlington–Basswood Historic District encompasses a substantial residential development project of the Arlington Mills Company in Lawrence, Massachusetts. Roughly bounded by Lawrence, Alder, Arlington, and Juniper Streets, the district includes 89 properties, most of which are triple-deckers or other multiunit housing. The area was developed by the company between 1909 and 1925 to address local issues of overcrowding and poor sanitation. Most of the housing built features Classical Revival detailing, with bands of distinctive shingles, roof brackets, and dentil molding in roof cornices. Although some properties have lost some of their character due to modifications such as the application of synthetic siding, many have not.

The district was listed on the National Register of Historic Places in 1984.

== See also ==
- National Register of Historic Places listings in Lawrence, Massachusetts
- National Register of Historic Places listings in Essex County, Massachusetts
