= Blakeley Building =

- U.S. National Register of Historic Places
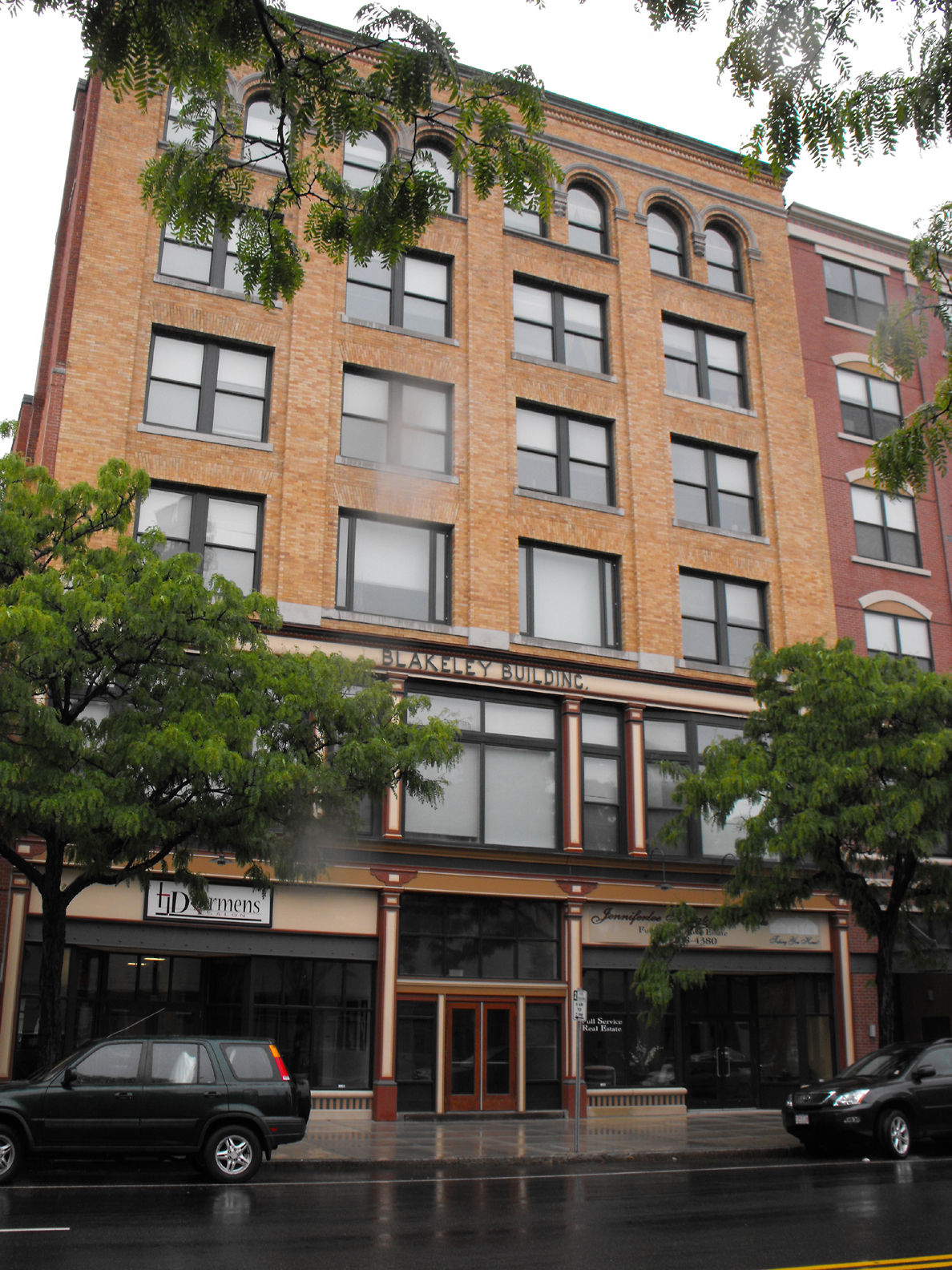
- Blakeley Building

- Location within Massachusetts Location within the United States
- Location: Lawrence, Massachusetts
- Coordinates: 42°42′22.01″N 71°9′55.05″W
- Built: 1898
- Architect: John Ashton
- NRHP reference No.: 09000299
- Added to NRHP: May 4, 2009

The Blakeley Building is a historic commercial building at 475-479 Essex St in central Lawrence, Massachusetts. It is the only well-preserved 19th century remnant of a streetscape that extended for the entire block. The four story Classical Revival building was built in 1898 for Richard Barlow, at that time completing the block between Franklin and Hampshire Streets. Since then, the other buildings have either been demolished and replaced, or have been altered substantially. Construction is predominantly in brick, with granite and metal trim elements. The building houses retail establishments on the ground floor and office space on its upper floors.

The building was listed on the National Register of Historic Places in 2009.

== See also ==
- Downtown Lawrence Historic District, about one block to the east
- National Register of Historic Places listings in Lawrence, Massachusetts
- National Register of Historic Places listings in Essex County, Massachusetts
