= Great Stone Dam =

- U.S. National Register of Historic Places
- U.S. Historic district – Contributing property
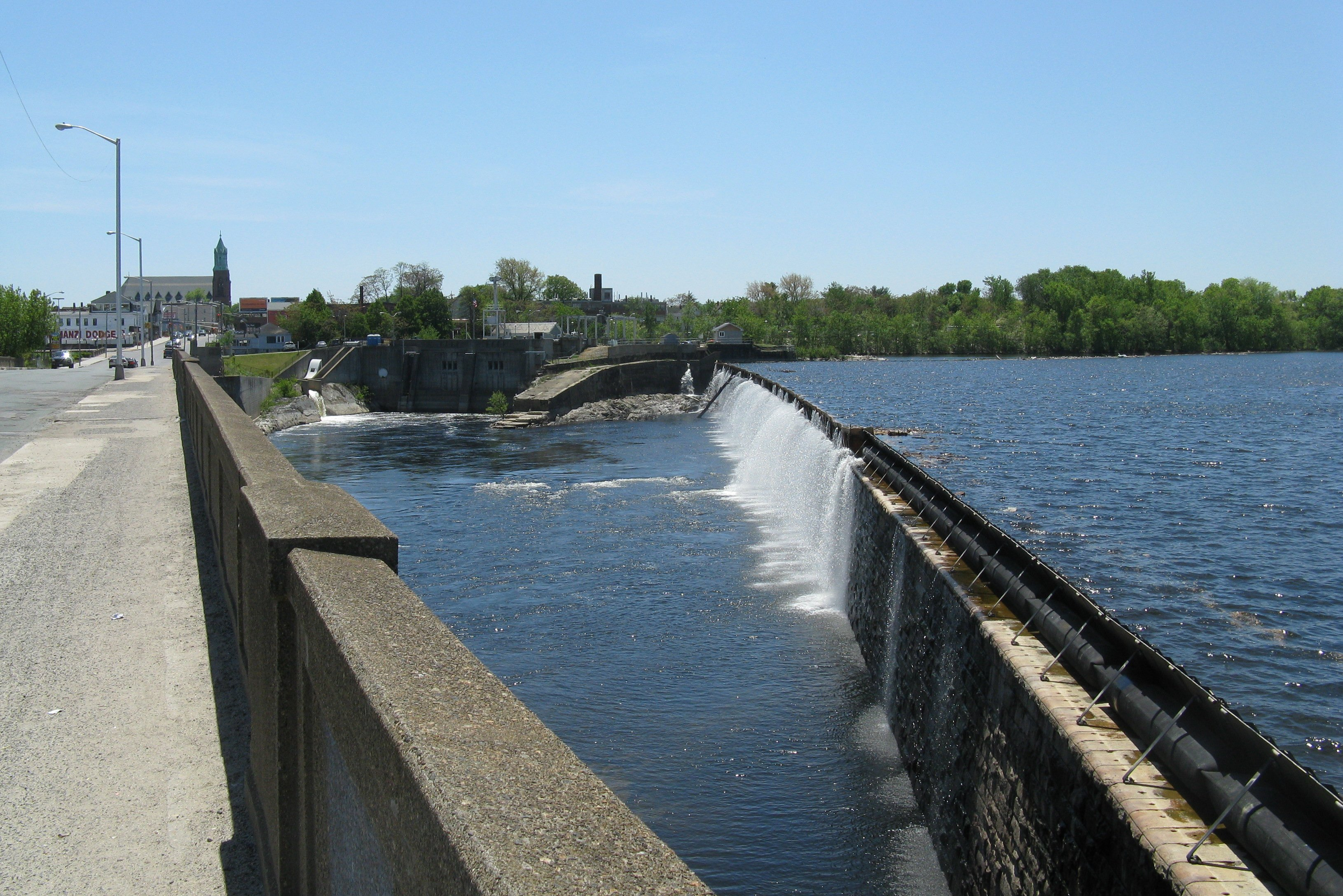
- Great Stone Dam

- Location within Massachusetts Location within the United States
- Location: Lawrence, Massachusetts
- Coordinates: 42°42′3″N 71°10′0″W
- Built: 1848; 178 years ago
- Architect: Charles Storer Storrow, Charles H. Bigelow
- Part of: North Canal Historic District (ID84000417)
- NRHP reference No.: 77000184

Significant dates
- Added to NRHP: April 13, 1977
- Designated CP: November 13, 1984

The Great Stone Dam, also called the Lawrence Dam or Lawrence Great Dam, was built between 1845 and 1848 on the site of Bodwell's Falls on the Merrimack River in what became Lawrence, Massachusetts. The dam has a length of 900 feet (270 m) and a height of 35 feet (11 m).

Lawrence is in Essex County, Massachusetts, approximately 25 miles (40 km) north of Boston and only a few miles south of the New Hampshire border (Salem), located in the Merrimack Valley. The dam is 11 miles (18 km) downstream from Lowell and is visible from Route 28 (Broadway) in Lawrence and from behind the Pacific Paper Mill (now defunct).

The dam feeds two canals (North, re-built in 1848, and South, completed in 1896). At their peak, the North Canal provided up to 13,000 horsepower and the South Canal 2,000 horsepower; the Essex Company sold "mill rights" to its water power, allowing mills to use the energy provided. The North Canal existed before the dam, but was redeveloped both to better feed the mills and to accommodate the 30-foot (9.1 m) drop caused by the dam. About a mile in length, the canal had a guard lock and three lift locks with mitered gates. The locks were abandoned in the 1960s.

Today the dam is the site of a hydroelectric plant, completed in 1981, which is owned by Central Rivers Power USA (now parent company of the Essex Company, which still owns the dam) and the Lawrence Hydroelectric Associates.

== Background ==
In part due to the successful use of the river's power to develop the industrial potential of the city of Lowell, a consortium of local industrialists (Abbott Lawrence, Edmund Bartlett, Thomas Hopkinson of Lowell, John Nesmith, and Daniel Saunders) set out to create a "New City on the Merrimack", which would later become known as Lawrence.

Land was acquired from towns on both sides of the Merrimack River (North Andover, Andover and Methuen) 11 miles downstream from Lowell. However, water power required a fall greater than the 5 feet (1.5 m) provided by the natural river drop; to achieve a usable water height of no less than 30 feet (9.1 m), a dam of unprecedented size would be required.

Initially known as "The Merrimack Water Power Association" (1843) under Samuel Lawrence and Daniel Saunders, the association had identified that "there lay a tract of land resting upon foundations of imperishable blue stone and so shaped and environed by nature as to be a rare site for a permanent dam and a connected system of canals, and for the building of a manufacturing city"; this tract was at Bodwell's Falls.

In 1845, Abbott Lawrence, Nathan Appleton, Patrick T. Jackson, John A. Lowell, Ignatius Sargent, William Sturgis and Charles S. Storrow incorporated as the Essex Company with a charter to develop water power for planned textile mills along the Merrimack River by building a dam at the preferred site. In addition to being a company director, Storrow was the lead engineer for the Essex Company and is credited as the designer and engineer of the dam.

Previous to incorporating as the Essex Company, the group of men had been known as the "Boston Associates" and had made similar developments upstream in Lowell, where a dam of similar (but smaller) size had already been built, giving rise to that industrial city.

The plans set forth by the Essex Company, for the dam and surrounding industrialization, were so popular that it took less than one month to acquire capital of 1 million dollars.

== Construction ==
Gilmore & Carpenter won the contract to build the dam. The construction commenced and finished on the same day (September 19) three years apart (one source states it was the same hour) from the first stone laid in 1845 to the last in 1848. Charles H. Bigelow, who had been an engineer in the US Army, supervised the construction.

The exact construction is outlined as follows:

The dam is constructed of huge granite blocks, laid in hydraulic cement firmly embedded and bolted upon the river rock bed. The thickness at the base is 35 feet, narrowed gradually to about 13 feet below the crest stone. The greatest height of masonry is 22 feet and the average plunge of water 25 to 26 feet without flashboards. The masonry, including wings extending inland, is 1,629 feet in length. The overflow of water is 900 feet wide from wing to wing, the crest line curving slightly upstream. A solid filling of earth, backing the masonry and sloping back, one foot in six, protects the structure. The south wing wall is 324 feet long and the north wing 405 feet. The original cost of the structure, at the time of building when prices of labor and material ruled low, was about $250,000.

The construction was innovative for the time as it used hydraulic injections of concrete into the spaces between the granite stones. This has led to the dam's reliability and durability, as despite several severe floods no repairs to the dam itself have ever been required, although repairs were made in 1894 to the wooden flashboards and the flashboard system was updated in 2007 to improve water control. No repairs to the stonework have ever been needed.

At the time of its construction it was the largest dam in the world, and it remains one of the significant landmarks defining the city to which its creation gave birth. It was so significant to the city at the time, a celebration was held in honor of its semi-centennial in 1895, yet now may be less celebrated, as at the site of the dam there is no viewing platform, monument or historical marker giving passersby information about the historical innovation and social marvel beneath their feet. The Lawrence History Center (located in what were the offices of the Essex Company) has significant displays on the dam and its creation.

The construction of the dams and canals might have been more expensive if not for the easy availability of cheap labor, often Irish immigrants, who worked in what could be appalling and unsafe conditions which contributed to injury and sometimes death.

== Post-construction (20th century) development ==
Increasingly from the end of World War II, the economic, social and industrial landscapes within which the mills relied on the dam's power were changing. Complex interrelated forces including geographical migration of the textile industry and development of an increasingly influential "consumer economy" with high shopper expectations, demanding price models and rapidly evolving fashion tastes, plus the development of energy and industrial technologies, all led to widespread mill closures, making the power the dam provided obsolete for current needs while also wholly inadequate for newer development.

While these and other changes reduced demand for the dam's energy, demand for hydroelectric power was growing: the Great Stone Dam was both literally and figuratively well placed to be as much a part of the future as it had been of the past if investment could be found for the necessary modernization. In the 1970s the Lawrence Hydroelectric Associates began the construction of a $28-million power plant at the south end of the Great Stone Dam that would ensure energy production and preserve the architectural integrity of the dam. In 1981, the project was completed allowing the generation of 16.8 MW of power, far more than the 15,000 horsepower (11 MW) the dam provided in its heyday.

The plant's development included a high-tech fish ladder intended to promote fish migration, especially salmon. Fish numbers in the river are higher than before, but time has shown that although the presence of a ladder is better than not having one, the dam—as do all unnatural river obstructions—has had a detrimental impact on natural resources. Although hydroelectric power has often been billed as a sustainable green energy source, continued sustainability relies on developing better ways of supporting nature, fish habitat and fundamental ecological services.

The need to work in partnership with nature and be more responsive to a changing climate led in 2007 to $3.5 million in improvements and repairs, including replacement of the old plywood flashboards with a more reliable metal and rubber-bladder washboard structure (for better flood and water level control), as well as improving fish migration. In 2008 repairs were delayed by exceptionally heavy rains which highlighted the necessity of the repairs. The development was carefully planned to ensure longevity and capacity for the 19th century achievement.

It remains owned by the Essex Company which itself is now owned by Central Rivers Power USA, in partnership with Lawrence Hydroelectric Associates.

Added to the National Register of Historic Places in 1977, the Great Stone Dam is considered one of the greatest engineering projects of the 19th century due to its size, its method and the impact of its development. It stands as testament to the heyday of great innovation and innovators, to a time of economic and social development, to the Essex Company itself, and most importantly to an immigrant city born in and of the American Industrial Revolution. It was further included in the North Canal Historic District in 1984.

== Contribution to local recreation ==
Because of the impact on the depth and flow of the river, and the large mill pond caused by the dam, the area above and below the dam have enhanced recreational opportunities.

A large area for sailing, kayaking and boating is located immediately upstream from the dam, supported by a large boat house housing the Greater Lawrence Community Boating Program (as well as a water rescue station).

Despite conservationist concerns over fish numbers, the area immediately below the dam is a popular fishing location for breeds such as white perch, American shad, river herring, and in season, striped bass, also known as "stripers", as the area has a larger concentration of fish due to the dam and an easily accessible shoreline for both boaters and shoreside anglers.

== See also ==
- North Canal Historic District
- National Register of Historic Places listings in Lawrence, Massachusetts
- Charles Storer Storrow
