= American Woolen Company Townhouses =

- U.S. National Register of Historic Places
- U.S. Historic district
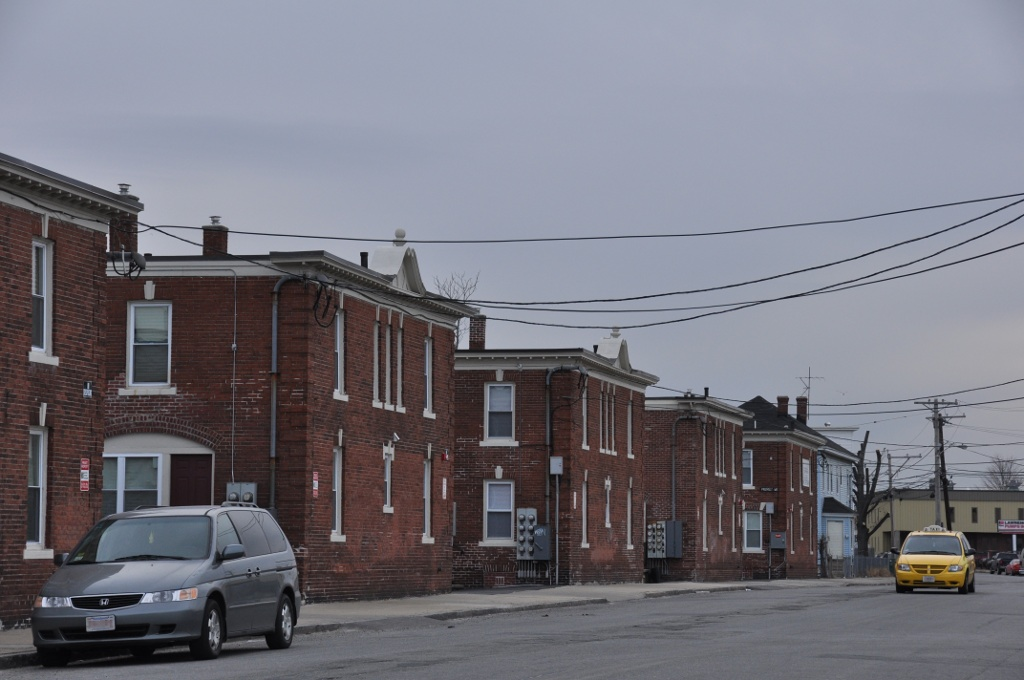
- View on Market Street of some of the units

- Location within Massachusetts Location within the United States
- Location: Lawrence, Massachusetts
- Coordinates: 42°42′1″N 71°9′18″W
- Built: 1907
- Architect: James E. Allen
- NRHP reference No.: 12000098
- Added to NRHP: March 12, 2012

The American Woolen Company Townhouses are a collection of brick townhouses built c. 1907 by the American Woolen Company in Lawrence, Massachusetts. They were part of a program of company-built housing between 1906 and 1910 that included the nearby American Woolen Mill Housing District. The townhouses are located on a series of short streets off Market Street in South Lawrence. A historic district comprising these six buildings was listed on the National Register of Historic Places in 2012.

The townhouses stand on a large parcel of land 100 feet (30 m) deep, with 475 feet (145 m) of frontage on Market Street. The lot has been divided into three sections, each of which contains two townhouses facing each other across a central private road (Wood Way, Washington Way, and Prospect Way). The short ends of the townhouses face Market Street. When originally built the central areas provided foot access to the units, but they have been paved over and are now used for parking.

The six buildings are identical in all major details, and were designed by local architect James E. Allen. Each one is a two-story brick 98 feet (30 m) long and 39 feet (12 m) deep, and houses seven living units. Each unit presents 14 feet (4.3 m) of frontage into the central area. There are minor variations in the front facades of the units. In some cases the entries of adjacent units are paired, and some entries or entry pairs are sheltered by a pilastered pediment. The rear of all units was substantially identical: a recessed porch, set under a segmented arch, provided access to the unit's back door.

== See also ==
- National Register of Historic Places listings in Lawrence, Massachusetts
- National Register of Historic Places listings in Essex County, Massachusetts
