= Mechanics Block Historic District =

Historic district in Massachusetts, United States

- U.S. National Register of Historic Places
- U.S. Historic district
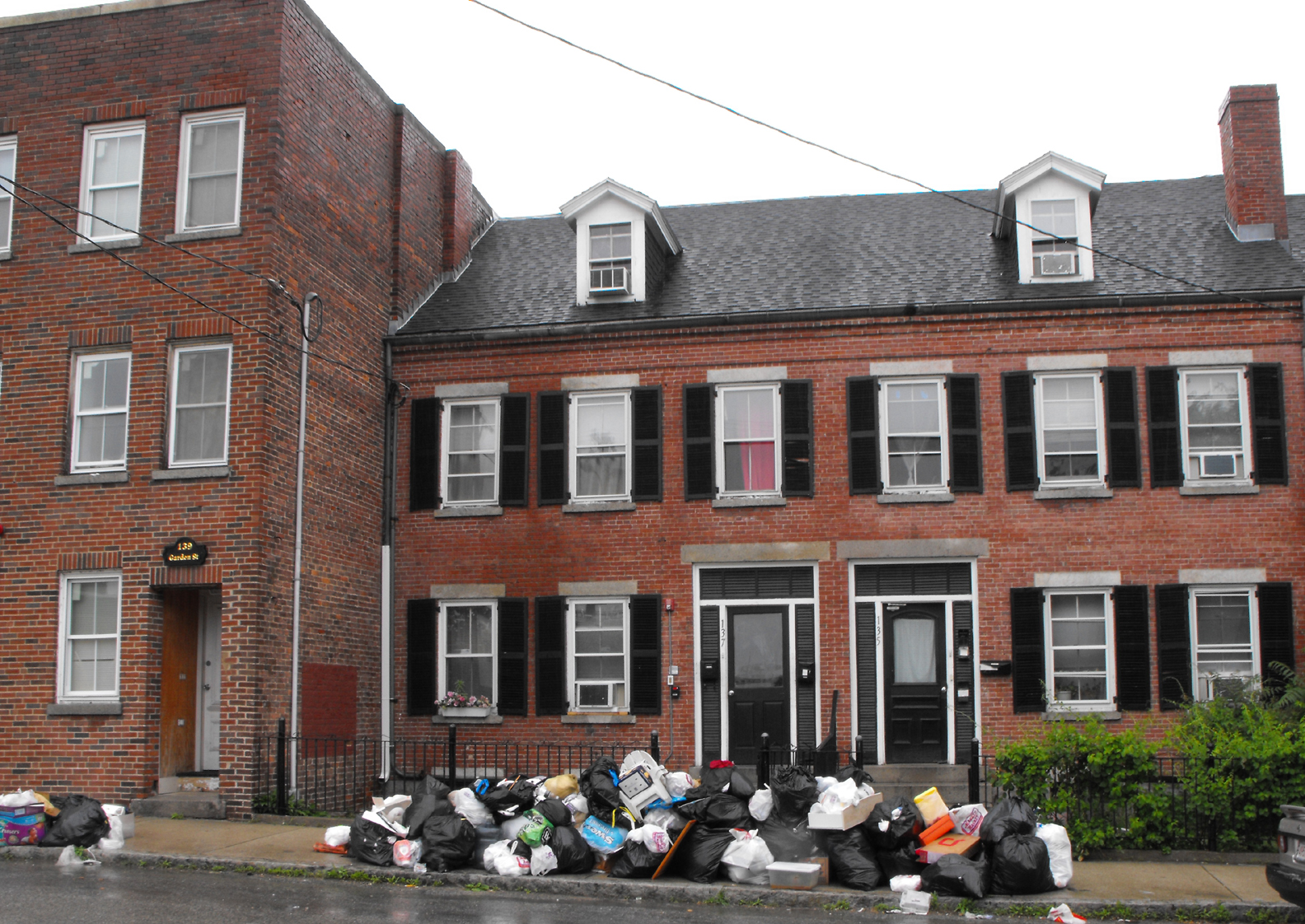

- Location within Massachusetts Location within the United States
- Location: Lawrence, Massachusetts
- Coordinates: 42°42′34″N 71°9′17″W
- Built: 1847
- Architectural style: Italianate
- NRHP reference No.: 73001942 (original); 78000451 (increase)

Significant dates
- Added to NRHP: April 3, 1973
- Boundary increase: May 23, 1978

The Mechanics Block Historic District is a historic district at 107–139 Garden St. and 6–38 Orchard Street in Lawrence, Massachusetts. It encompasses two segments of brick rowhouses that are back-to-back. The rowhouses are 2 1/2-story brick buildings, organized into mirror-image pairs, with a single gable-roof dormer piercing the side-gable roofs for each unit. They were built in 1847 by the Essex Company (the development arm of the Lawrence mill operators) as worker housing.

The district was listed on the National Register of Historic Places in 1973, and expanded in 1978.

== See also ==
- National Register of Historic Places listings in Lawrence, Massachusetts
- National Register of Historic Places listings in Essex County, Massachusetts
