= John Ashton (architect) =

American architect

- Born: September 15, 1861; England
- Died: September 30, 1953 (aged 92); Lawrence, Massachusetts
- Occupation: Architect

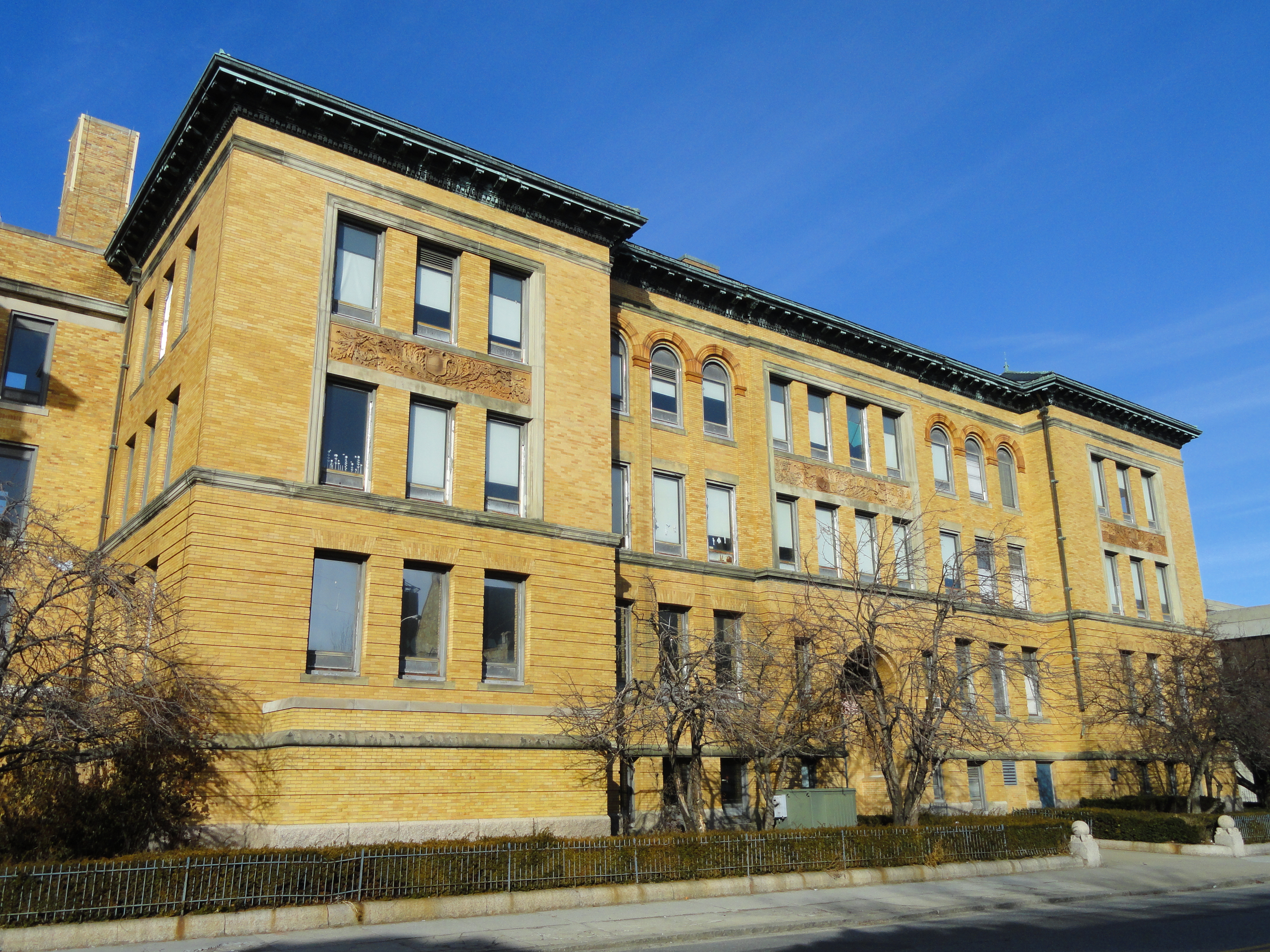
The former Lawrence High School, designed by John Ashton and built in 1899.

John Ashton (1861-1953) was an English-born American architect from Lawrence, Massachusetts.

== Life ==
John Ashton was born September 15, 1861, in England. He immigrated to the United States in 1875, where he settled in Lawrence. He worked as a mechanic with Joseph James through at least 1889, about the time be appears to have begun to study architecture. In 1892 he enrolled in a special course in architecture in the Massachusetts Institute of Technology and opened an office of his own in 1893. He quickly rose through the profession, and became a major competitor of the more-established George G. Adams, the city's leading architect.

He was a sole practitioner until 1909, when he established a partnership with Albert Senter Huntress. The firm was expanded in 1920 to include John F. Alter. Ashton, Huntress & Alter was dissolved in 1933, when Alter opened his own office. Ashton and Huntress practiced together until 1943, when Ashton retired. Huntress continued the firm, admitting Clarence A. Pratt to the partnership. Ashton, Huntress & Pratt was dissolved upon Pratt's death in 1955.

== Personal life ==
Ashton was married to Rebecca Woodworth, and had at least two children. He died September 30, 1953.

== Legacy ==
Several buildings by Ashton and his firms are listed on the National Register of Historic Places.

== Architectural works ==
=== John Ashton, 1893-1909 ===
- 1895 - Engine House No. 6, 480 Howard St, Lawrence, Massachusetts
- 1897 - United Congregational Church, 61a Warren St, Lawrence, Massachusetts
- 1897 - Joseph James House, 567 Haverhill St, Lawrence, Massachusetts
- 1897 - Joseph Walworth House, 541 Haverhill St, Lawrence, Massachusetts
- 1898 - Blakeley Building, 477 Essex St, Lawrence, Massachusetts
  - Home to the Ashton office through the 1950s.
- 1899 - Central Fire Station, 24 Lowell St, Methuen, Massachusetts
- 1899 - Lawrence High School (Former), 51 Lawrence St, Lawrence, Massachusetts
- 1903 - Portsmouth High School (Former), 20 Islington St, Portsmouth, New Hampshire
- 1904 - John Ashton House, 571 Haverhill St, Lawrence, Massachusetts
  - The architect's own home.
- 1908 - Engine House No. 9, 161 1/2 Bailey St, Lawrence, Massachusetts

=== Ashton & Huntress, 1909-1920 ===
- 1909 - Second Congregational Church, 308 Main St, West Newbury, Massachusetts
- 1910 - John Breen School, 114 Osgood St, Lawrence, Massachusetts
- 1910 - Central School (Former), 281 Main St, West Newbury, Massachusetts
- 1910 - Clubhouse, Merrimack Valley Golf Club, 210 Howe St, Methuen, Massachusetts
  - Demolished.
- 1910 - Wolcott Building, 160 Market St, Lynn, Massachusetts
- 1912 - Bradley Block, Central Street Lowell, Massachusetts
- 1912 - Abraham Edwards School, 45 Rantoul St, Beverly, Massachusetts
- 1914 - Bristol Building, 758 Purchase St, New Bedford, Massachusetts
- 1915 - Central School, 213 Main St, Epping, New Hampshire
- 1915 - Smith Building, 175 Water St, Exeter, New Hampshire
- 1916 - Meigs Building, 45 Broadway, Lawrence, Massachusetts
  - Demolished.
- 1919 - Edward L. Bennett Funeral Home, 281a Broadway, Lawrence, Massachusetts
- 1920 - West Junior High School, 68 Waverley Ave, Watertown, Massachusetts

=== Ashton, Huntress & Alter, 1920-1933 ===
- 1920 - Charles S. Brown School (Former), 30 Conant St, Beverly, Massachusetts
- 1921 - Stephen Barker School, 129 Haverhill St, Methuen, Massachusetts
- 1922 - Saxonville School, 25 Elm St, Saxonville, Massachusetts
- 1923 - Calvary Baptist Church, 234 Common St, Lawrence, Massachusetts
  - Demolished.
- 1924 - American Legion Post No. 122, 190 Broadway, Methuen, Massachusetts
- 1925 - James F. Leonard School, 60 Allen St, Lawrence, Massachusetts
- 1926 - Framingham Memorial Building, 150 Concord St, Framingham, Massachusetts
- 1927 - Masonic Temple, 31 Green St, Newburyport, Massachusetts
- 1928 - Arcade Building, 149 Concord St, Framingham, Massachusetts
- 1929 - Boston & Maine Station, 65 Merrimack St, Lawrence, Massachusetts
- 1929 - Eagle Tribune Building, 281 Essex St, Lawrence, Massachusetts
- 1930 - Portsmouth Junior High School, 155 Parrott Ave, Portsmouth, New Hampshire
- 1931 - James I. Lawlor School, 41 Lexington St, Lawrence, Massachusetts

=== Ashton & Huntress, 1933-1943 ===
- 1937 - Pasteur Hall, Lowell Textile Institute, Lowell, Massachusetts
- 1938 - Chelmsford High School (Addition), 50 Billerica Rd, Chelmsford, Massachusetts
- 1941 - Muethuen Municipal Garage, 33 Lindberg Ave, Methuen, Massachusetts
- 1942 - Victory Steel Products Plant, 371 Market St, Lawrence, Massachusetts

=== Ashton, Huntress & Pratt, 1943-1955 ===
- 1946 - Searles High School (Addition), 41 Pleasant St, Methuen, Massachusetts
- 1949 - Central Elementary School, Main St, Salem, New Hampshire
- 1951 - Diamond Spring Gardens, Beacon Ave, Lawrence, Massachusetts
- 1952 - Foster School (Former), 11 Town Hall Ave, Tewksbury, Massachusetts
- 1953 - Our Lady Seat of Wisdom Chapel, Marist College, Poughkeepsie, New York

== Gallery ==
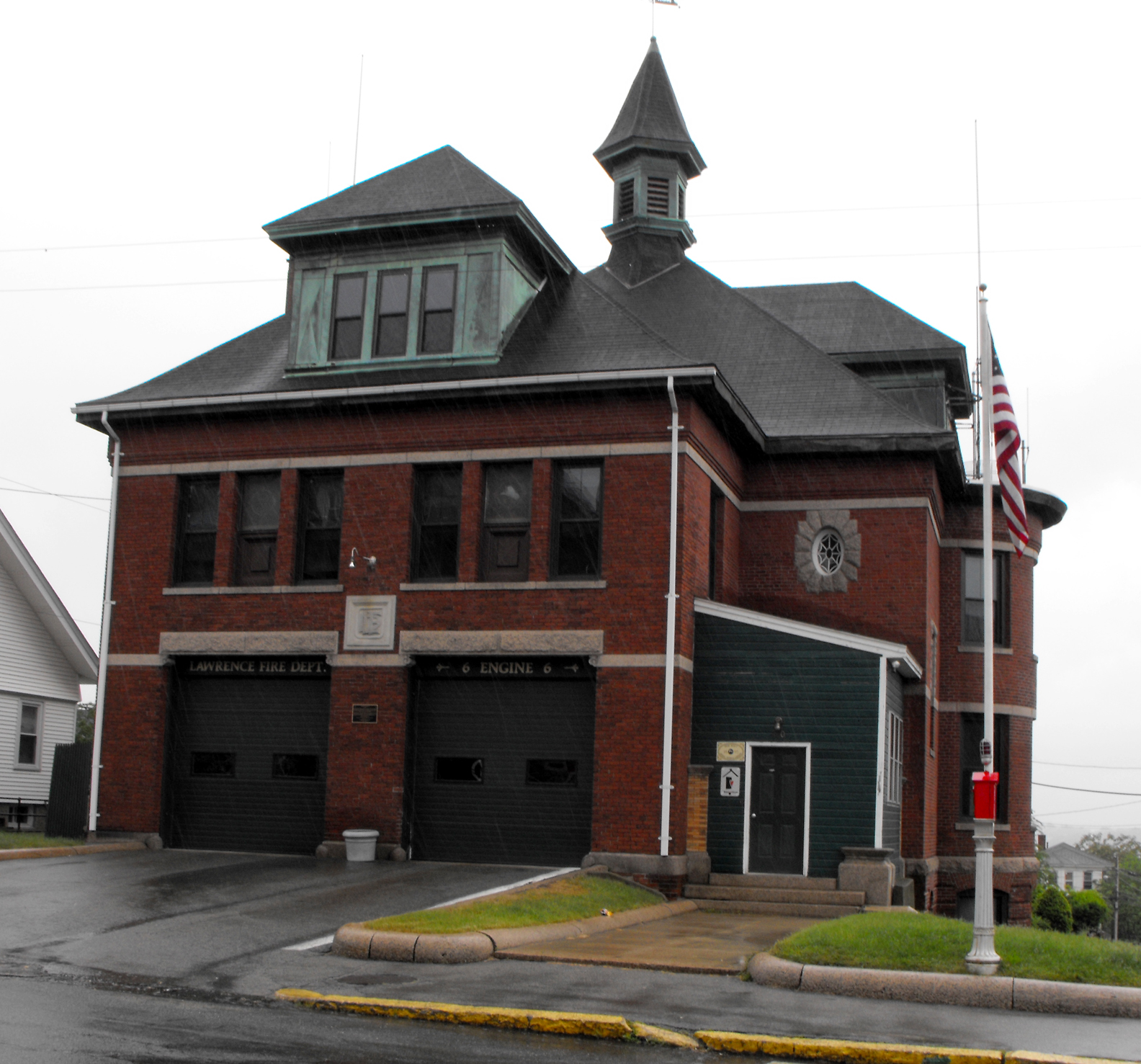
Engine House No. 6, Lawrence, 1895.

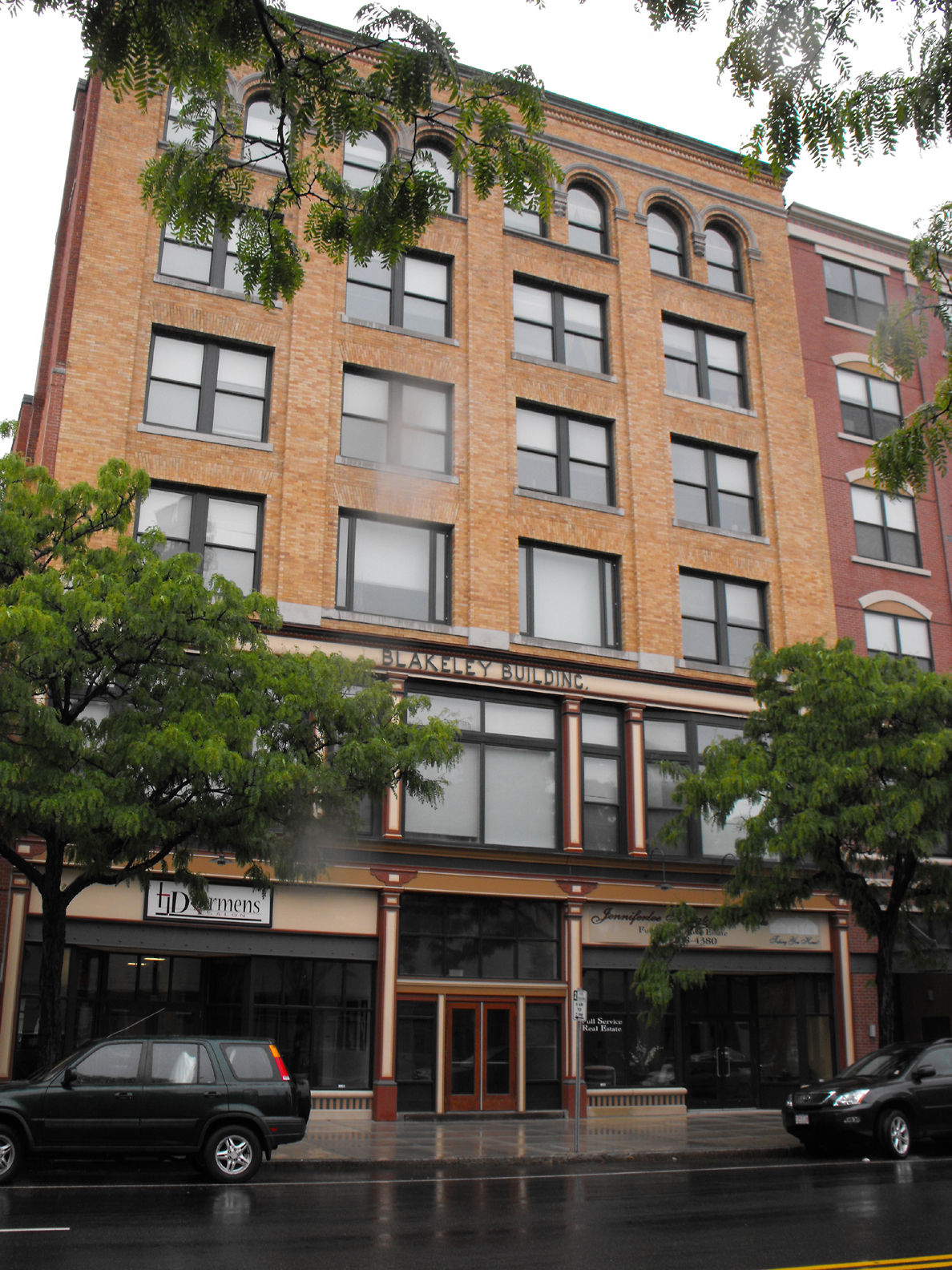
Blakeley Building, Lawrence, 1898.

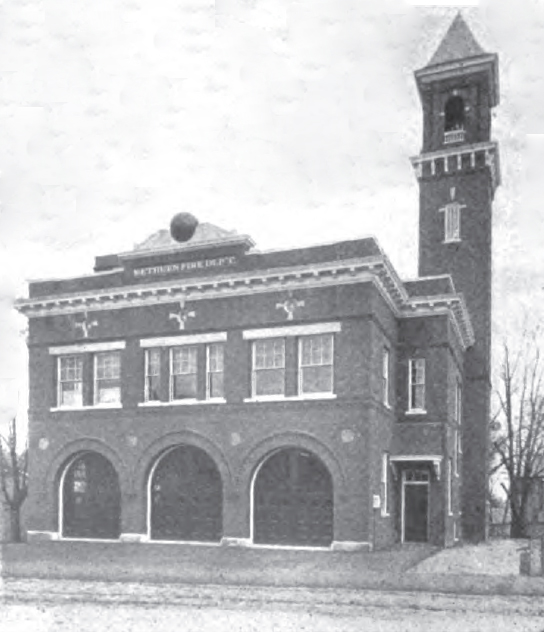
Central Fire Station, Methuen, 1899.

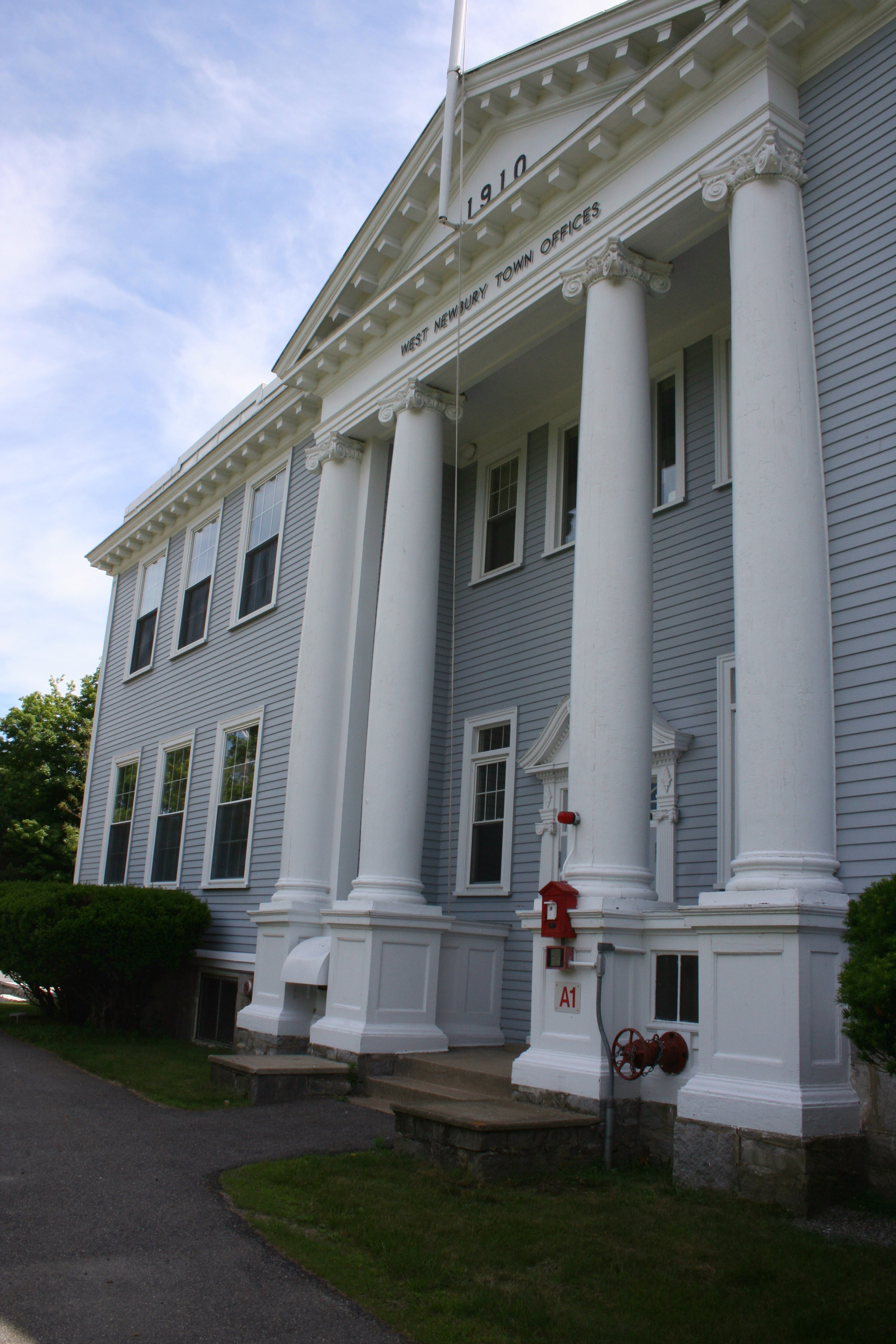
Central School, West Newbury, 1910.

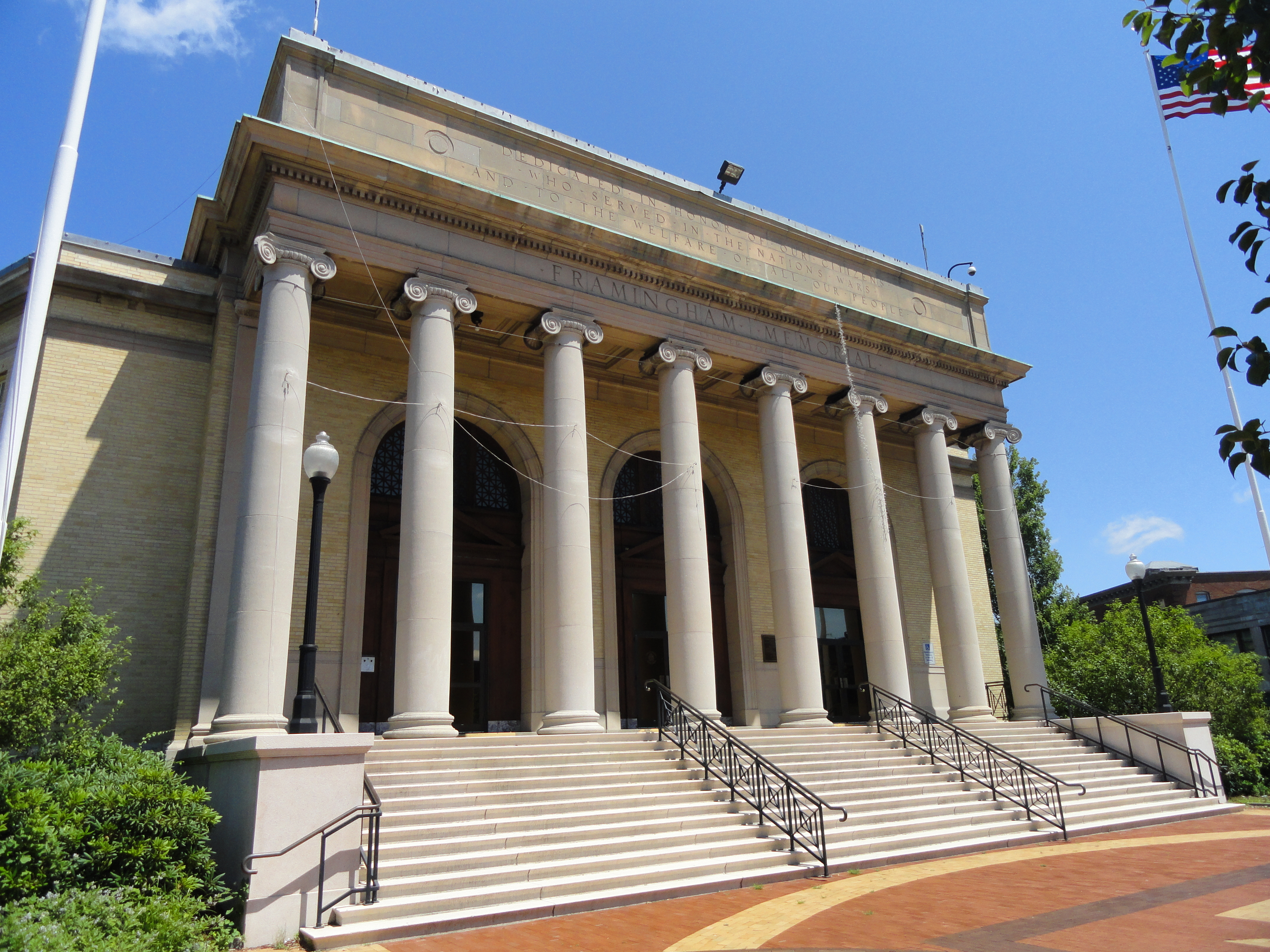
Memorial Building, Framingham, 1926.

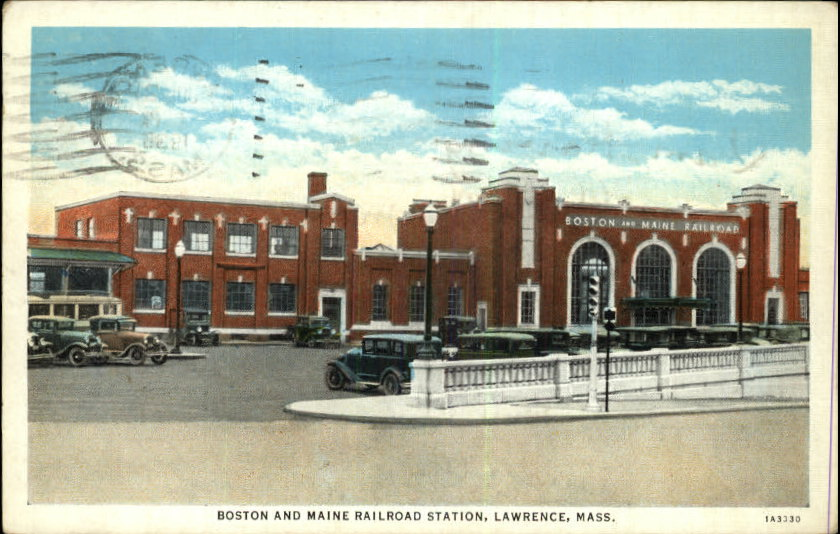
Boston & Maine Station, Lawrence, 1929.

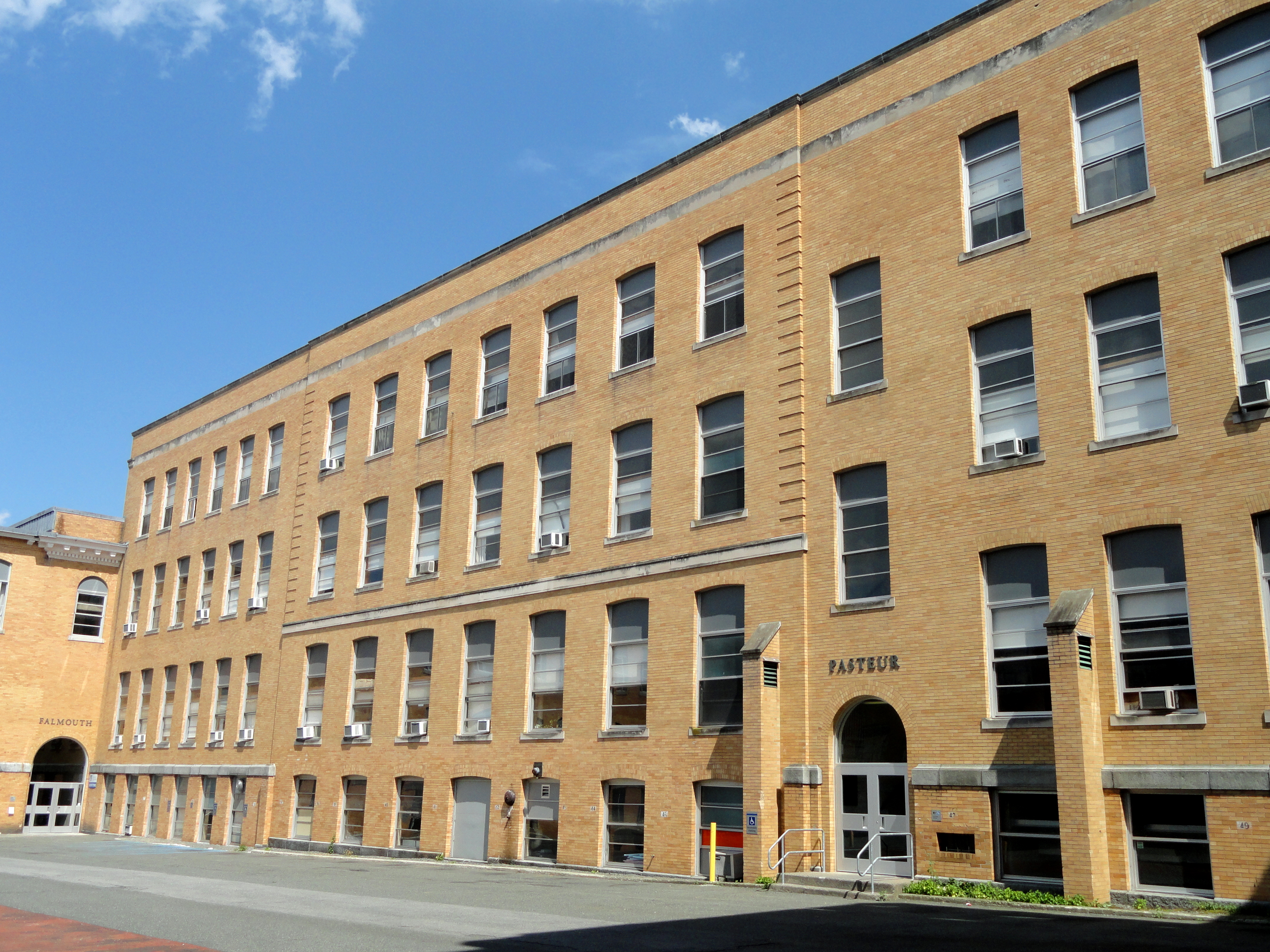
Pasteur Hall, Lowell Textile Institute, 1937.
