= Wood Worsted Mill =

- U.S. National Register of Historic Places
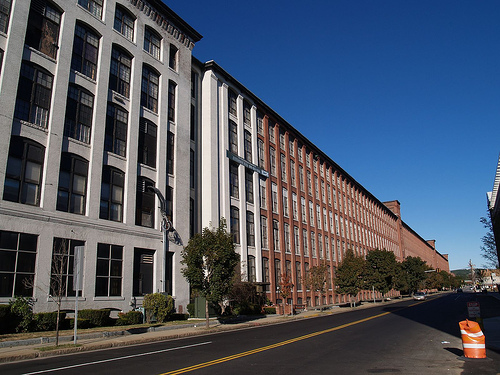

- Location within Massachusetts Location within the United States
- Location: Lawrence, Massachusetts
- Coordinates: 42°42′09″N 71°9′12″W
- Built: 1906
- NRHP reference No.: 10000539
- Added to NRHP: August 12, 2010

The Wood Worsted Mill is located at South Union St. and Merrimack Street, on the south bank of the Merrimack River, in Lawrence, Massachusetts. The mill building was constructed between 1906 and 1909 for the American Woolen Company, and was dubbed by some locals as the "eighth wonder of the world" due to its size. It is a six-story brick building that is 1,300 feet (400 m) long and 125 feet (38 m) high, and encompasses some 17 miles (27 km) of aisles. Its purpose when built was to perform the complete textile manufacturing cycle of worsted woolens, from raw material to finished fabric, under a single roof.

The surviving mill elements include the main building and a portion of a storehouse. The storehouse is a seven-story brick building located just east of the main building, of which approximately half remains from its original construction. The two sections (of an original four) were demolished in 2009, along with a number of other structures in the complex, including sections of the main mill building.

The main mill building as it now stands is divided into four parts, featuring Romanesque Revival styling executed in brick with granite and cast stone detailing. The first is an office section, which protrudes from the main body. Like the main part of the building it is six stories, but is topped by a clock tower. The other three sections were originally labelled D, E, and F, and extend eastward from the office. Section D is 33 window bays, E is 42, and F 45 window bays in length. There are three stairwell towers that interrupt the pier-and-spandrel construction of the length of the building on its south (street-facing) elevation. These stairhouses are where entry is gained to the premises, through doorways recessed under arches. The north facade, facing the river, is uniformly window bays, broken only by wrought iron fire escapes and a few bricked-up bays where the building was connected to the demolished A, B, and C sections via covered bridges over a railroad spur.

The mill complex was listed on the National Register of Historic Places on August 12, 2010. At the time of the listing, section D was being converted to residential housing.

== See also ==
- National Register of Historic Places listings in Lawrence, Massachusetts
- National Register of Historic Places listings in Essex County, Massachusetts
