= Gleason Building (Lawrence, Massachusetts) =

- U.S. National Register of Historic Places
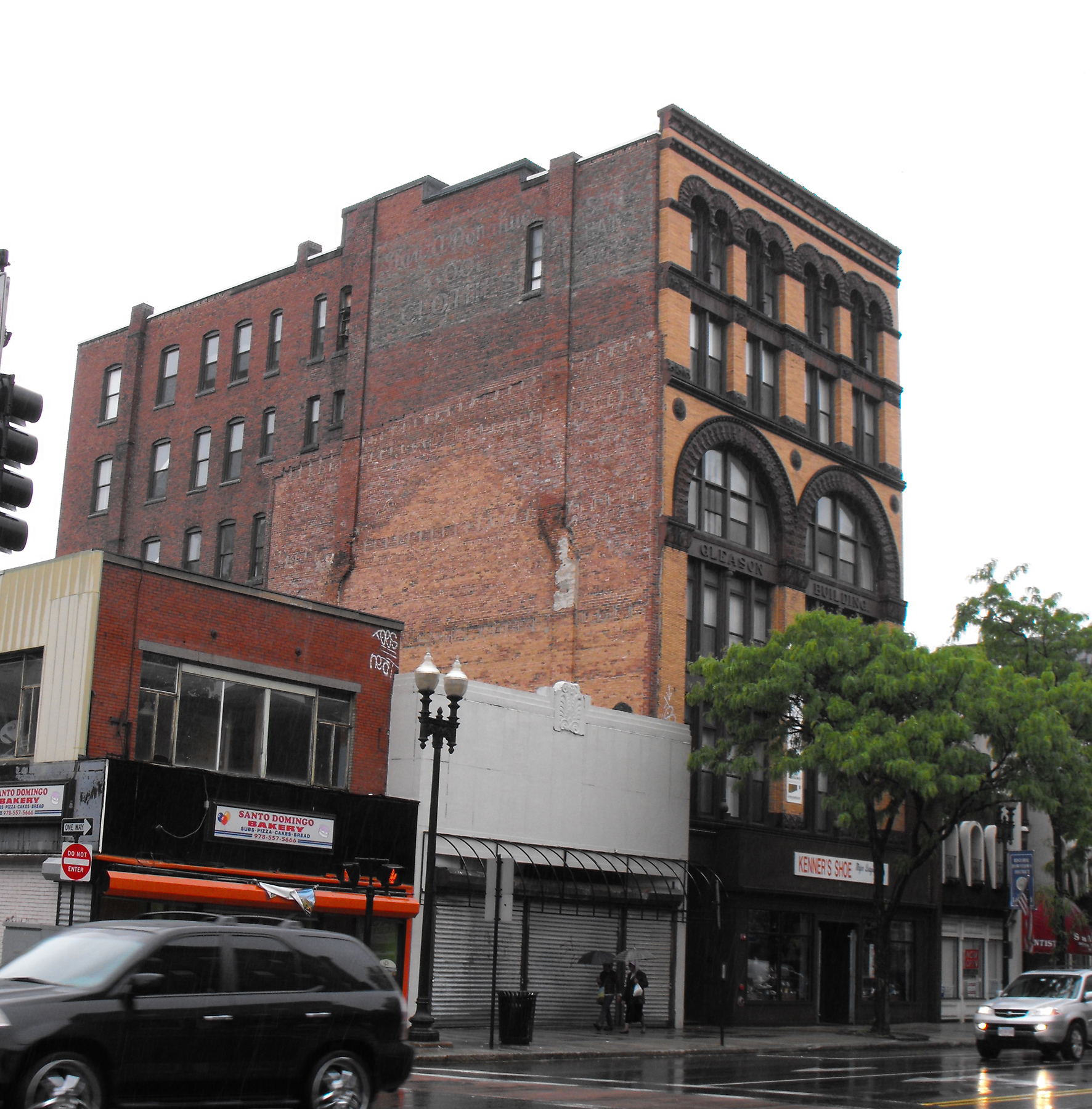

- Location within Massachusetts Location within the United States
- Location: 349–351 Essex St., Lawrence, Massachusetts
- Coordinates: 42°42′27″N 71°9′46″W
- Built: 1890
- Architect: Arthur F. Gray
- NRHP reference No.: 82001880
- Added to NRHP: April 15, 1982

The Gleason Building (now known as G Lofts) is a historic commercial building located at 349-351 Essex Street in Lawrence, Massachusetts.

== Description and history ==
It is a Richardsonian Romanesque style building, six stories (72 feet) tall, faced in brick and brownstone. It was built by William Oswald to a design by Arthur F. Gray, and boasted the city's first hydraulic elevator. The second to fourth floors of the facade are divided in two sections by brick piers that rise to round brownstone arches, with bands of sash windows on the lower two levels. The top floor is also architecturally distinctive, with four pairs of windows, each topped by a round brownstone arch.

In 2006, the buildings interior was completed gutted and renovated, and subsequently converted into 15 one-bedroom loft apartments with ground-floor retail space, and the building was renamed G Lofts.

The building was listed on the National Register of Historic Places on April 15, 1982.

== See also ==
- National Register of Historic Places listings in Lawrence, Massachusetts
- National Register of Historic Places listings in Essex County, Massachusetts
