= Engine House No. 6 (Lawrence, Massachusetts) =

- U.S. National Register of Historic Places
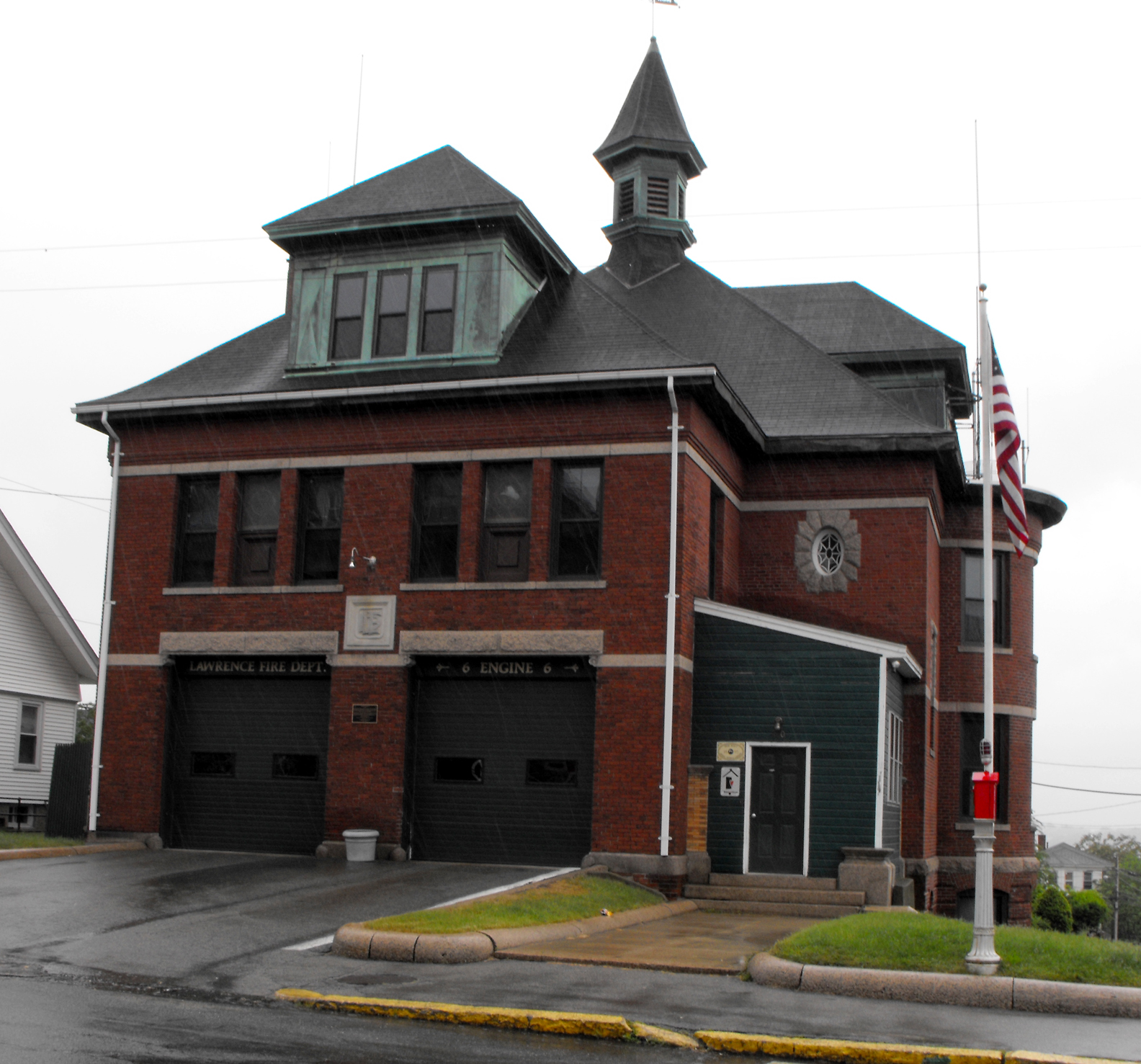

- Location within Massachusetts Location within the United States
- Location: Lawrence, Massachusetts
- Coordinates: 42°42′50.528″N 71°8′56.318″W
- Built: 1895
- Architect: John Ashton
- Architectural style: Colonial Revival, Other
- NRHP reference No.: 04000533
- Added to NRHP: June 2, 2004

Engine House No. 6 is a historic firehouse at 480 Howard Street in Lawrence, Massachusetts. Built in 1895–96 to a design by John Ashton, the Colonial Revival brick building is the oldest firehouse building in the city, and its design was used in the development of other city fire stations. Shuttered by budget cuts in 2009, it was reopened in 2012, and continues to serve its original purpose. It was listed on the National Register of Historic Places in 2004.

== Description and history ==
Engine House No. 6 is set at the top of Prospect Hill on Lawrence's northeast side. It is a densely populated residential area, with the Richardsonian Romanesque John R. Rollins School across the street serving as a complementary municipal site. From the front the brick building appears to be 2 1/2 stories in height, but it has a full third story below due to its steeply sloping lot. The front facade is three bays wide, with the left two taken up by a projecting section that includes two truck bays, with groups of three sash windows above, and a hip-roof dormer (faced in copper) which also has three windows. The right bay has a clapboarded entrance, which was once an open porch, with an oriel window above. The truck bay openings are topped by granite lintels, and there is a granite beltcourse around the building just below their level. The north facade has a rounded bay section, affording views down the hill.

The firehouse was designed by John Ashton, a local architect, who deliberately embellished the building's design with details taken from the neighboring Rollins School. It was built in 1895–96 to address the need for fire protection in the rapidly developing Prospect Hill neighborhood. The building's design was reused in 1908 by the city for its No. 9 (Bailey Street) station, adding only a hose drying tower.

The firehouse was one of three closed due to budget concerns in 2009. It was reopened in 2012 after the city received a grant from the Federal Emergency Management Agency.

== See also ==
- National Register of Historic Places listings in Lawrence, Massachusetts
- National Register of Historic Places listings in Essex County, Massachusetts
