= Charles Storer Storrow =

American civil engineer and industrialist (1809–1904)

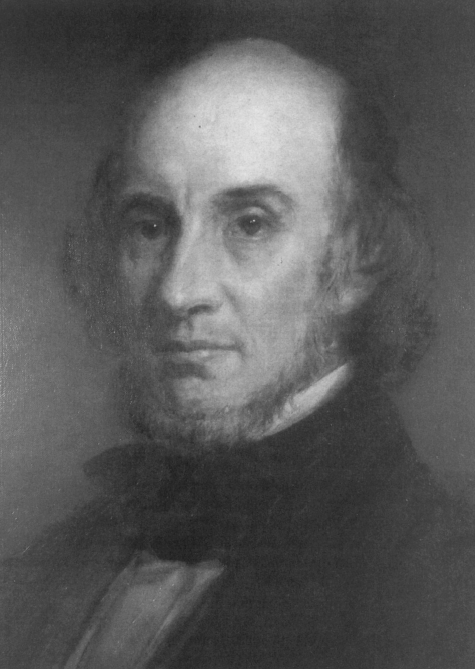
- Charles Storer Storrow by Joseph Ames 1854

1st Mayor of Lawrence, Massachusetts
- In office 1853–1854
- Preceded by: None
- Succeeded by: Enoch Bartlett

Personal details
- Born: 25 March 1809 Montréal, Quebec, Canada
- Died: 30 April 1904 (aged 95) Boston, Massachusetts, U.S.
- Party: Whig
- Children: James J. Storrow
- Education: Harvard University
- Engineering career
- Discipline: Hydraulic
- Employer: Essex Company
- Projects: Great Stone Dam, Lawrence, Massachusetts

Charles Storer Storrow (25 March 1809 – 30 April 1904) was a prominent American civil engineer and industrialist. He is known for designing and building the dam and textile mill complex in Lawrence, Massachusetts.

== Biography ==
Charles Storer Storrow was born in Montréal, Canada, on March 25, 1809. From age 9 to 15 he attended Collége Royal de Bourbon (now Lycée Condorcet) in Paris, France, where his father had a business. In 1824 he returned to America and completed his secondary education at the Round Hill School. He entered Harvard College as a sophomore in 1826 and graduated at the top of his class in 1829. His thesis was entitled Of the Celestial Motions

On the advice of America's leading civil engineer at the time, Loammi Baldwin, he returned to Paris and spent two years (1830-1832) as an auditeur libre at École des Ponts et Chaussées where he studied hydraulics under Gaspard de Prony and applied mechanics under Claude-Louis Navier.

Returning to America in 1832, Storrow joined the engineering staff of the Boston and Lowell Railroad and went on to become the railroad's business agent in 1836. In 1845 Storrow left the Boston and Lowell to become the chief engineer at the Essex Company, a company organized to harness the water power of the Merrimack River downstream from Lowell, Massachusetts. Storrow designed and built the Great Stone Dam across the Merrimack river, canals to distribute the water, several large textile mills, and a city, Lawrence, to house the mill workers. He came up with the idea to make roads that go to the mills in Lawrence, and became the first mayor of Lawrence in 1853.

Storrow's book, A Treatise on Water-Works for Conveying and Distributing Supplies of Water; with Tables and Examples, introduced American civil engineers to the mathematical theory of hydraulics and put America hydraulic engineering on a strong scientific basis. Storrow also authored an extensive report on the Hoosac Tunnel and contributions to Lowell Hydraulic Experiments, a book by his protégé, James Bicheno Francis.

James J. Storrow, after whom Boston's Storrow Drive is named, was Charles Storrow's grandson.

== Honors ==
- Honorary Member, American Society of Civil Engineers
- Fellow, American Academy of Arts and Sciences
