= Jackson Terrace Historic District =

Historic district in Massachusetts, United States

- U.S. National Register of Historic Places
- U.S. Historic district
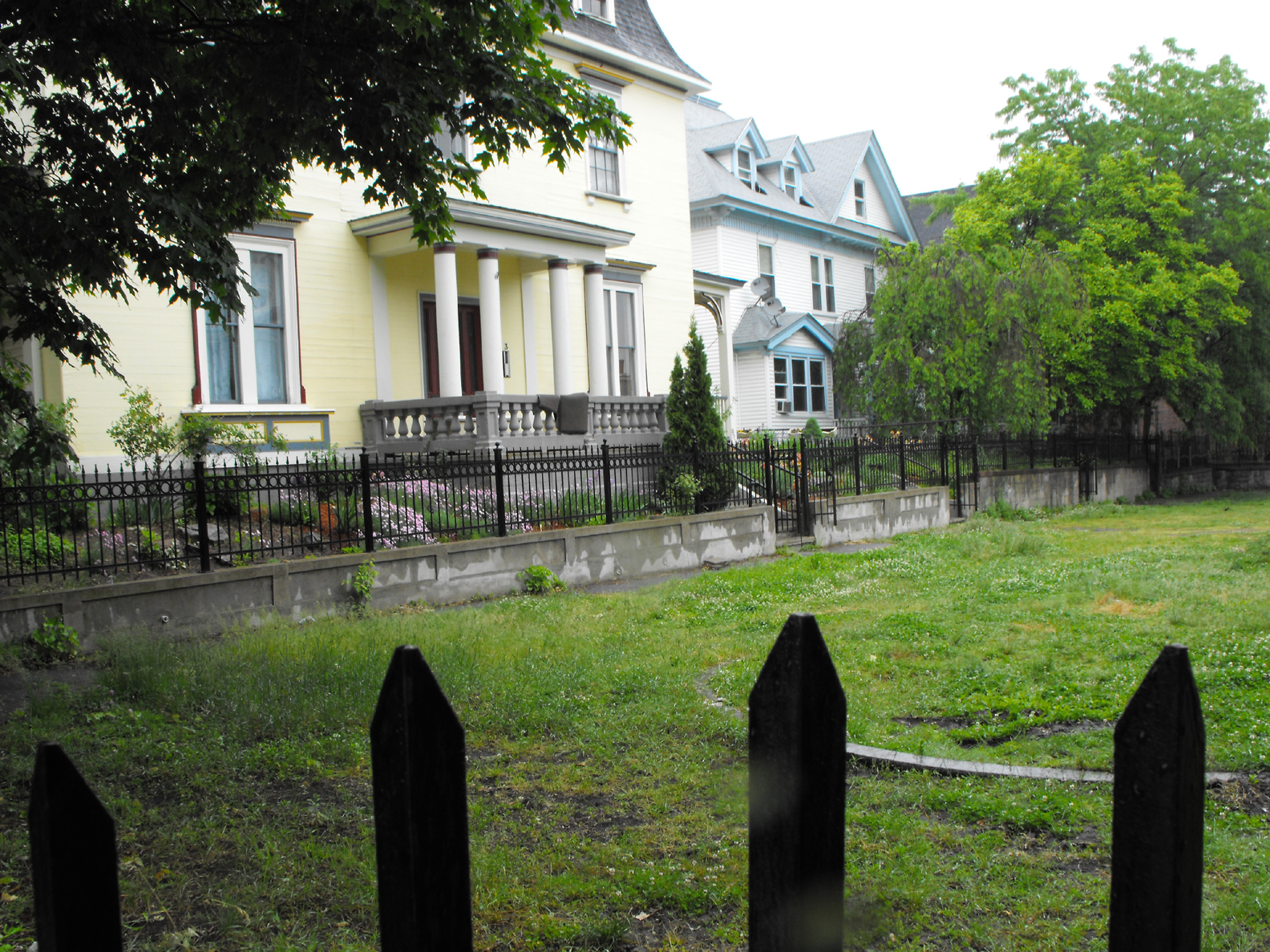

- Location within Massachusetts Location within the United States
- Location: 43–59 Jackson St., Jackson Court, Jackson Terr., and 58–62 Newberry Street, Lawrence, Massachusetts
- Coordinates: 42°42′35″N 71°9′26″W
- Built: 1845
- Architectural style: Italianate, Queen Anne
- NRHP reference No.: 84000414
- Added to NRHP: November 13, 1984

Jackson Terrace Historic District is a historic district in Lawrence, Massachusetts. Jackson Terrace, located on the east side of Camapgnone Common, was developed as a residential extension of the Common, with a small central park area ringed by residences. The houses that line it are distinctive renditions of Italianate, Second Empire, and Queen Anne architecture.

The district was listed on the National Register of Historic Places in 1984.

== See also ==
- National Register of Historic Places listings in Lawrence, Massachusetts
