= Buildings at 24–30 Summer St. =

- U.S. National Register of Historic Places
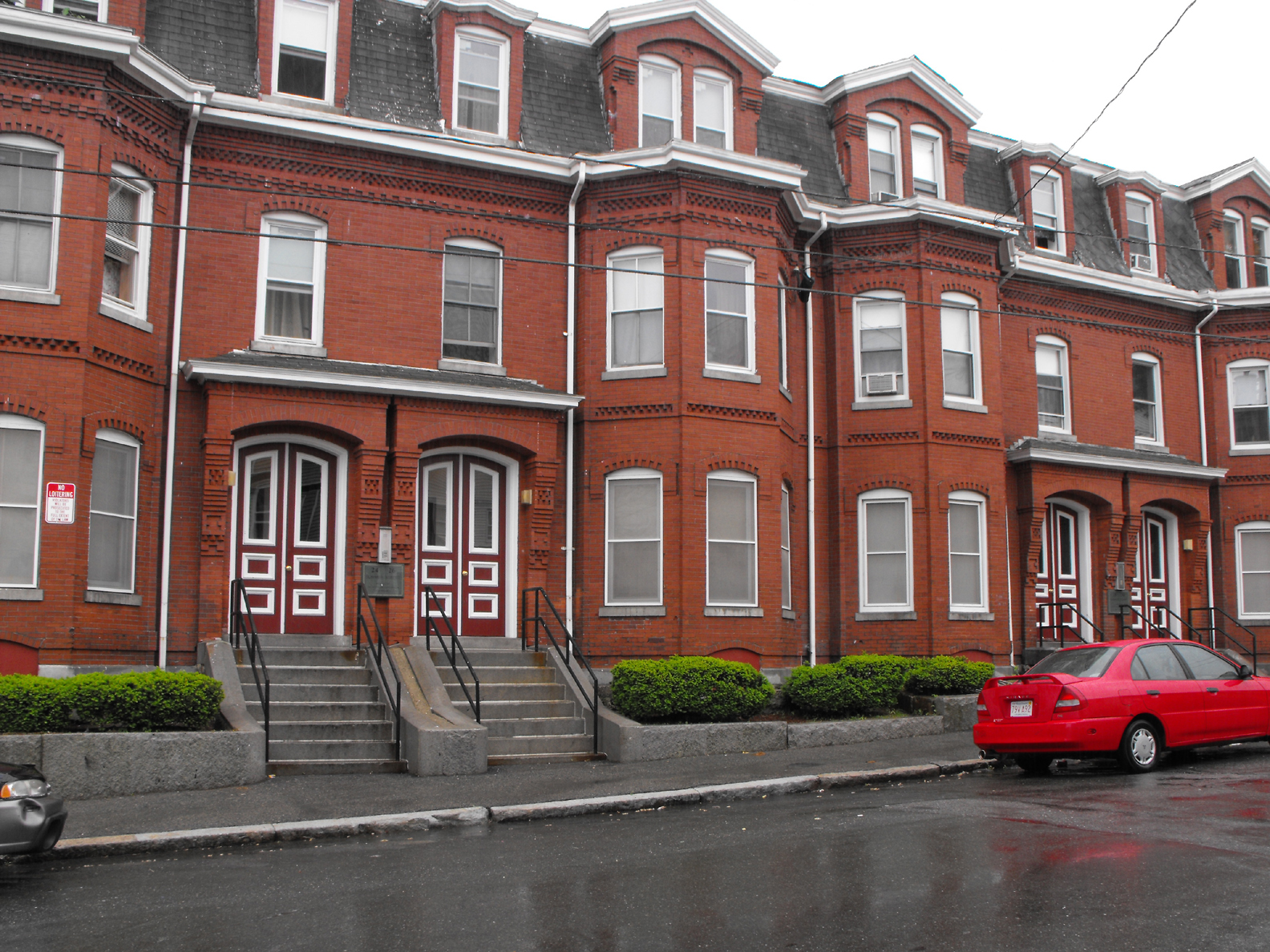

- Location within Massachusetts Location within the United States
- Location: 24–30 Summer St., Lawrence, Massachusetts
- Coordinates: 42°42′37″N 71°9′16″W
- Built: 1877
- NRHP reference No.: 85003067
- Added to NRHP: December 5, 1985

The buildings at 24–30 Summer St. are a series of brick rowhouses in Lawrence, Massachusetts. The three-story Second Empire residences were built in 1877 for Joseph Bushnell and E. S. Yates as rental properties. They consist of four units, arranged in mirror-image pairs. Within each pair the entrances are in the center, and there is a projecting bay section on the outside, which rises to the top of the second floor, where the mansard roof begins. There are single-window dormers projecting from the roof above the doorways, and double-window dormers above the bay. Both the larger dormers and the entrances have segmented-arch settings. The doorways are flanked by decorative brickwork, and there are corbelled brickwork courses above the first and second-floor windows. The buildings have had only minor exterior alteration since their construction.

The buildings were listed on the National Register of Historic Places in 1985.

== See also ==
- National Register of Historic Places listings in Lawrence, Massachusetts
- National Register of Historic Places listings in Essex County, Massachusetts
