= American Woolen Mill Housing District =

Historic district in Massachusetts, United States

- U.S. National Register of Historic Places
- U.S. Historic district
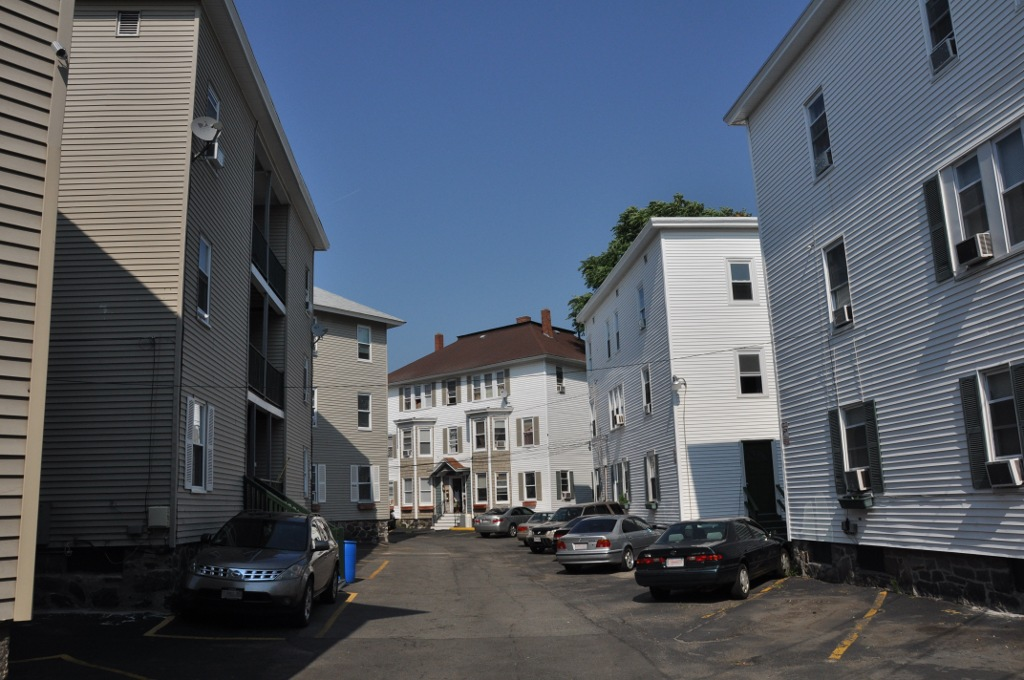
- The central courtyard of the housing district

- Location within Massachusetts Location within the United States
- Location: Lawrence, Massachusetts
- Coordinates: 42°41′59″N 71°9′28″W
- Built: 1909
- Architect: James E. Allen
- Architectural style: Colonial Revival, Queen Anne
- NRHP reference No.: 82001990
- Added to NRHP: April 8, 1982

The American Woolen Mill Housing District is a residential historic district at 300–328 Market Street in Lawrence, Massachusetts. It consists of nine three story multiunit tenements built in the first decade of the 20th century. They are situated in a roughly oval pattern around a central courtyard, a distinctive pattern designed to provide open space while maximizing housing density. The property was designed by local architect James E. Allen, and had features unusual for tenements, including gas heat and indoor plumbing.

The district was listed on the National Register of Historic Places in 1982.

== See also ==
- American Woolen Company Townhouses, located nearby
- National Register of Historic Places listings in Lawrence, Massachusetts
- National Register of Historic Places listings in Essex County, Massachusetts
