= Daniel Saunders School =

- U.S. National Register of Historic Places
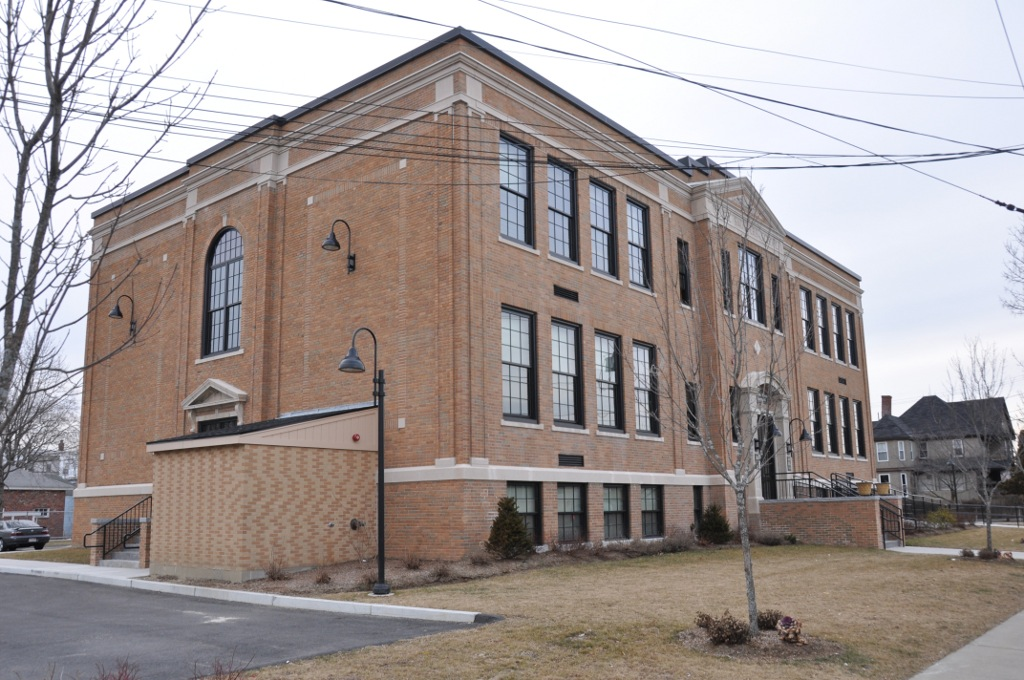

- Location within Massachusetts Location within the United States
- Location: Lawrence, Massachusetts
- Coordinates: 42°41′33″N 71°09′41″W
- Area: 0.66 acres (0.27 ha)
- Built: 1931
- Architect: Joseph G. Morissette
- Architectural style: Classical Revival
- NRHP reference No.: 11000266
- Added to NRHP: May 11, 2011

The former Daniel Saunders School is a historic school building at 243 S. Broadway in Lawrence, Massachusetts. The two story Classical Revival building was built in 1931, replacing a previous school building on the same site that was destroyed by fire. It is faced in yellow Flemish brick, trimmed with cast stone, over a concrete block frame. The main entrance is in a slightly projecting bay that extends the full height of the building, topped by a triangular pediment and flanked by pilasters. The side ends of the building also have slightly projecting central bays, with round arch windows on the second floor and doorways topped by pedimented hoods with scrolled brackets.

The school, like the one it replaced, was named for Daniel Saunders, a key figure in the founding of Lawrence and the town's first treasurer. This building was designed by local architect Joseph G. Morissette, who is known primarily for his ecclesiastical projects. It was one of three schools whose construction was authorized in June 1931, which were built for a combined cost of about $174,000.

The Saunders School served the first through third grades for most of its life, but in its later years served only as a kindergarten facility. It was formally closed in 2006, and sold in 2009. It has been rehabilitated to provide sixteen housing units for homeless families; it is the first facility of this type in the state.

The building was listed on the National Register of Historic Places in 2011.

== See also ==
- National Register of Historic Places listings in Lawrence, Massachusetts
- National Register of Historic Places listings in Essex County, Massachusetts
