= National Register of Historic Places listings in Lawrence, Massachusetts =

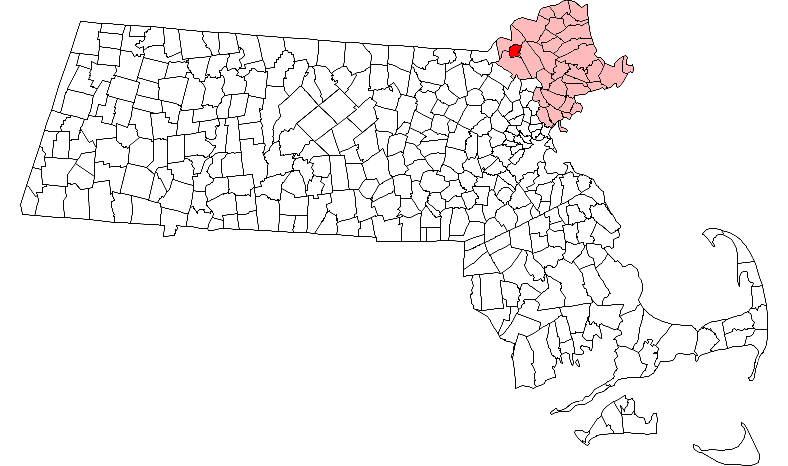
Location of Lawrence in Massachusetts

The following properties are listed on the National Register of Historic Places in Lawrence, Massachusetts.

This is intended to be a complete list of the properties and districts on the National Register of Historic Places in Lawrence, Massachusetts, United States. The locations of National Register properties and districts for which the latitude and longitude coordinates are included below, may be seen in a Google map.

Essex County, of which Lawrence is a part, is the location of 461 properties and districts listed on the National Register. Lawrence itself is the location of 24 of these properties and districts.

This National Park Service list is complete through NPS recent listings posted July 10, 2026.

== Current listings ==
	Name on the Register	Image	Date listed	Location	City or town	Description
1	American Woolen Company Townhouses	American Woolen Company Townhouses	March 12, 2012 (#12000098)	1-14 Wood Way, 1-14 Washington Way, 1-14 Prospect Way; 42°42′01″N 71°09′18″W		
2	American Woolen Mill Housing District	American Woolen Mill Housing District	April 8, 1982 (#82001990)	300-328 Market St. 42°41′59″N 71°09′28″W		
3	Arlington Mills Historic District	Arlington Mills Historic District	January 3, 1985 (#85000023)	Broadway between Manchester, Stafford and Chase Sts. 42°42′56″N 71°10′52″W		Extends into Methuen
4	Arlington-Basswood Historic District	Arlington-Basswood Historic District	November 13, 1984 (#84000406)	Roughly bounded by Lawrence, Alder, Arlington, and Juniper Sts. 42°43′08″N 71°10′11″W		
5	Bellevue Cemetery	Bellevue Cemetery	October 3, 2003 (#03000993)	170 May St. 42°42′38″N 71°11′10″W		Extends into Methuen
6	Blakeley Building	Blakeley Building	May 4, 2009 (#09000299)	475-479 Essex St. 42°42′22″N 71°09′55″W		
7	Buildings at 24–30 Summer St.	Buildings at 24–30 Summer St.	December 5, 1985 (#85003067)	24–30 Summer St. 42°42′37″N 71°09′16″W		
8	Downtown Lawrence Historic District	Downtown Lawrence Historic District	November 1, 1979 (#79000329)	Roughly bounded by MA 110, Methuen, Lawrence and Jackson Sts. 42°42′32″N 71°09′38″W		
9	Engine House No. 6	Engine House No. 6	June 2, 2004 (#04000533)	480 Howard St. 42°42′49″N 71°08′59″W		
10	Essex Company Machine Shop	Essex Company Machine Shop	November 9, 1972 (#72000138)	Union St. 42°42′34″N 71°09′17″W		
11	Essex Company Offices and Yard	Essex Company Offices and Yard	April 26, 1979 (#79000330)	6 Essex St. 42°42′26″N 71°09′15″W		
12	Gleason Building	Gleason Building	April 15, 1982 (#82001880)	349-351 Essex St. 42°42′27″N 71°09′46″W		
13	Grace Episcopal Church	Grace Episcopal Church	November 7, 1976 (#76001966)	Common and Jackson Sts. 42°42′31″N 71°09′29″W		
14	Great Stone Dam	Great Stone Dam	April 13, 1977 (#77000184)	Merrimack River and MA 28; 42°42′03″N 71°10′00″W		
15	High Service Water Tower and Reservoir	High Service Water Tower and Reservoir	November 20, 1978 (#78000450)	Off MA 110; 42°42′26″N 71°11′01″W		
16	Jackson Terrace Historic District	Jackson Terrace Historic District	November 13, 1984 (#84000414)	43-59 Jackson St., Jackson Court, Jackson Terr., and 58-62 Newberry St. 42°42′35″N 71°09′26″W		
17	Mechanics Block Historic District	Mechanics Block Historic District	April 3, 1973 (#73001942)	107-139 Garden St. and 6-38 Orchard St. 42°42′34″N 71°09′17″W		
18	North Canal	North Canal	July 29, 1975 (#75000278)	Parallel to Canal St. 42°42′18″N 71°09′29″W		
19	North Canal Historic District	North Canal Historic District	November 13, 1984 (#84000417)	Roughly bounded by the Merrimack and Spicket Rivers, North, Canal, and Broadway; 42°42′15″N 71°09′40″W		Boundary increase (listed May 8, 2009)
20	Old Public Library	Old Public Library	November 28, 1978 (#78000452)	190 Hampshire St. 42°42′34″N 71°10′05″W		
21	John R. Rollins School	John R. Rollins School	August 10, 2000 (#00000956)	451 Howard St. 42°42′49″N 71°08′55″W		
22	Sacred Heart Parish Complex	Sacred Heart Parish Complex	November 29, 2011 (#11000853)	321 S. Broadway; 42°41′22″N 71°09′32″W		
23	Daniel Saunders School	Daniel Saunders School	May 11, 2011 (#11000266)	243 S. Broadway; 42°41′33″N 71°09′39″W		
24	Wood Worsted Mill	Wood Worsted Mill	August 12, 2010 (#10000539)	S. Union St. and Merrimack St. 42°42′09″N 71°09′12″W		

== See also ==
- List of National Historic Landmarks in Massachusetts
- National Register of Historic Places listings in Essex County, Massachusetts
- National Register of Historic Places listings in Massachusetts
