= North Canal Historic District =

Historic district in Massachusetts, United States

- North Canal
- U.S. National Register of Historic Places
- U.S. Historic district
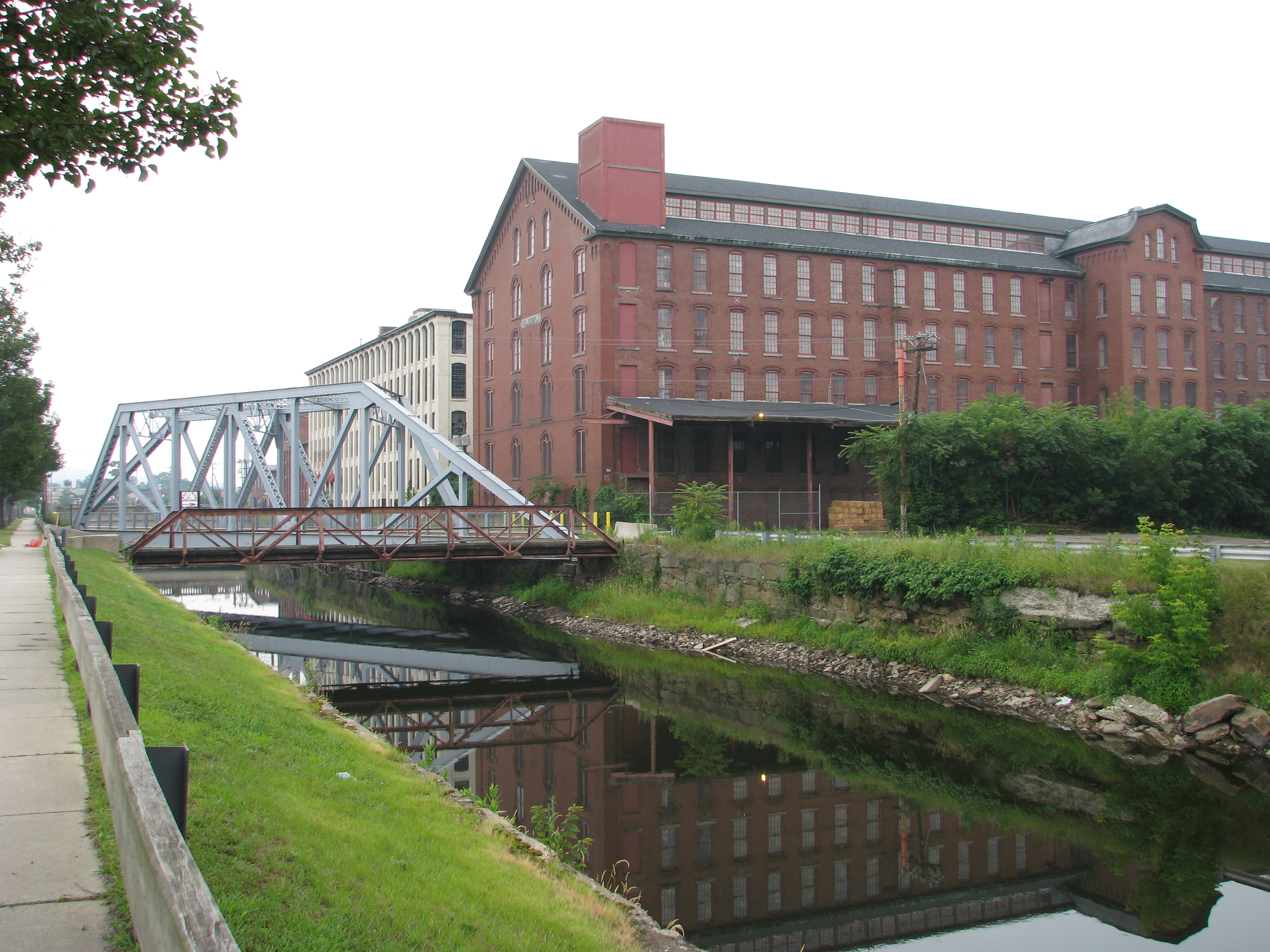
- The Pemberton Mill along the North Canal

- Location within Massachusetts Location within the United States
- Location: Lawrence, Massachusetts
- Coordinates: 42°42′18″N 71°9′29″W
- Built: 1845
- Architect: Charles S. Storrow
- NRHP reference No.: 75000278
- Added to NRHP: July 29, 1975

- North Canal Historic District
- U.S. National Register of Historic Places
- U.S. Historic district
- Location: Lawrence, Massachusetts
- Built: 1845
- Architect: Charles S. Storrow
- Architectural style: Renaissance, Greek Revival, Romanesque
- NRHP reference No.: 84000417 (original); 09000280 (increase)

Significant dates
- Added to NRHP: November 13, 1984
- Boundary increase: May 8, 2009

The North Canal Historic District of Lawrence, Massachusetts, encompasses the historic industrial heart of the city. It is centered on the North Canal and the Great Stone Dam, which provided the waterpower for its many mill complexes. The canal was listed on the National Register of Historic Places in 1975, while the district was first listed in 1984, and then expanded slightly in 2009.

The city of Lawrence was founded by industrialist Abbott Lawrence and the associates of the Essex Company as a model industrial city. In 1845 they company acquired land from then towns of Methuen and Andover and began construction on the North Canal and the Great Stone Dam. The work included dredging and building out of "new land", and effectively created a small island between the Merrimack River and the canal, whose outlet is at the mouth of the Spicket River. Work on these two major features was completed in 1848, and development of the city, which formally incorporated in 1853, proceeded from there. The historic district encompasses, in addition to the canal and the dam, the mill-related buildings on the island and on the north side of the canal, as well as a few buildings that front on Methuen and Union Streets, or the connecting side streets. The 2009 expansion of the district, included a single building, the Morehouse Bakery building at 5-9 Mill Street.

== Canal and Great Stone Dam ==
The Great Stone Dam was constructed across the Merrimack River at a place called Bodwell's Falls, where there is a five-foot drop. The dam was built to raise the height of the drop to 30 feet (9.1 m). It is made of granite blocks laid on a bed of hydraulic cement. At its base it is 35 feet (11 m) thick, shrinking to 13 feet (4.0 m) at its top. It has three sections: the central span is 900 feet (270 m), a south wing 324 feet (99 m) directs flow to the South Canal, and a 405 feet (123 m) wing directs water into the North Canal. It has a gatehouse, from which 24 gates in its sluiceway were controlled before the controls were electrified. Nearby on the island are also the surviving gatekeeper's house, an 1845 Greek Revival wood-frame structure, and a c. 1860s barn.

The North Canal runs parallel to the Merrimack River, and is 5,330 feet (1,620 m) long. It ranges in width from 100 feet (30 m) at its upper end to 30 feet (9.1 m) where its wasteway joins the Spicket River. The canal is trapezoidal in its cross-section, with walls lined by granite, and a bottom made of granite rubble that has been sealed with clay. It is capable of delivering 4,000 cubic feet of water per second; water power is still used in some of the mills lining its banks. The canal used to have operable locks for navigation; the upper ones were removed and the lower ones were filled in.

== Mill complexes ==
The Pacific Mills complex is an extensive array of buildings in the western (upper) and central parts of the district. The oldest standing building, a storehouse, dates to 1860, and there are remnants of an earlier 1852 structure. One of the more impressive structures is the Weave Shed built in 1890; it is a two-story brick building 300 feet (91 m) long. Its main cotton complex comprises five buildings on the north side of the canal. In the central part of the district the Pacific Mills include buildings in which both cotton and worsted wool products were manufactured.

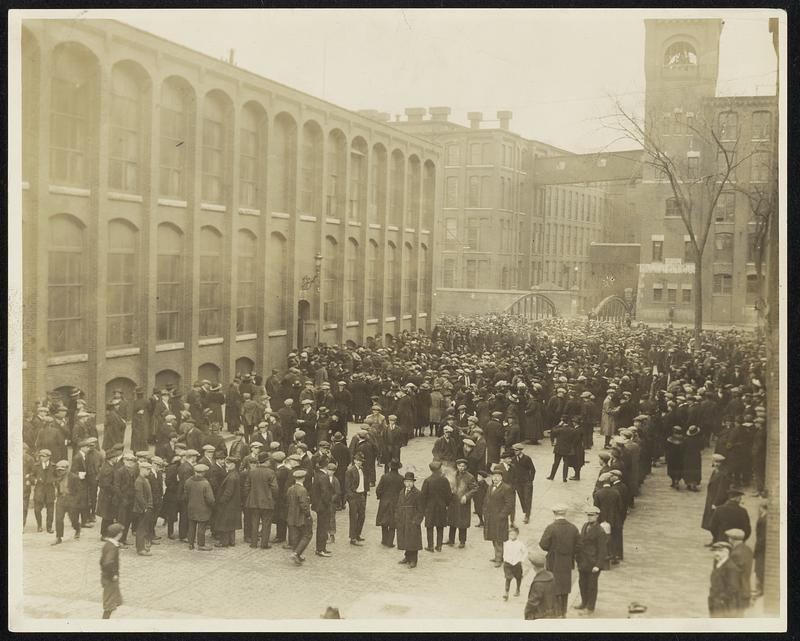
Strikers outside the Pacific lower mills during the 1922 New England textile strike

The Atlantic Mill Company buildings stand next to those of the Pacific Mills in the upper portion of the island. Only two notable buildings survive, the c. 1906 spinning mill, and a boarding house (one of two such buildings to survive in the district) that dates to 1847 and is the only surviving remnant of what was once a much more extensive housing district.

The central portion of the district includes mill buildings from a number of manufacturers, including the Bay State Woolens Company (whose c. 1847 brick boarding house is now the visitor center of Lawrence Heritage State Park), the Washington Mills, and buildings of the American Woolen Company and the Pemberton Mill. Other notable buildings here include the Essex Company Offices and Yard (separately listed on the National Register). The lower portion of the district is predominantly occupied by the mill complexes of the Everett Mills and the Kuhnhardt Woolen Mills.

== See also ==
- National Register of Historic Places listings in Lawrence, Massachusetts
- National Register of Historic Places listings in Essex County, Massachusetts
