= Arlington Mills Historic District =

Historic district in Massachusetts, United States

- U.S. National Register of Historic Places
- U.S. Historic district
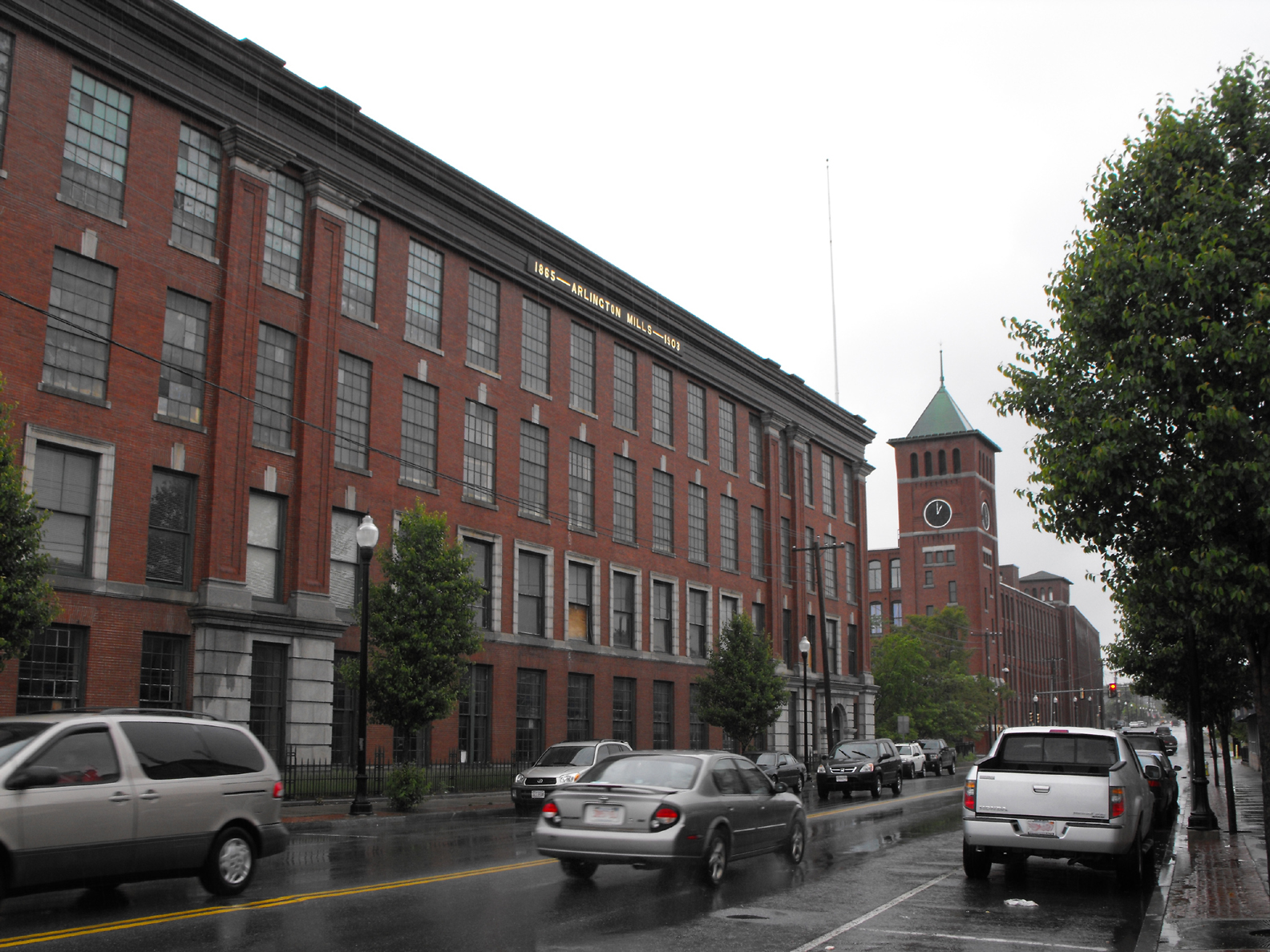

- Location within Massachusetts Location within the United States
- Location: Broadway, Lawrence and Methuen, Massachusetts
- Coordinates: 42°42′56″N 71°10′52″W
- Area: 75 acres (30 ha)
- Built: 1865
- Architect: Lockwood-Green Company
- NRHP reference No.: 85000023
- Added to NRHP: January 3, 1985

The Arlington Mills Historic District encompasses a major 19th century textile manufacturing complex in Lawrence and Methuen, Massachusetts. Developed between 1865 and 1925, it was one of the state's largest textile operations at its height. At the time of its listing on the National Register of Historic Places in 1985, the mill complex was owned by Malden Mills.

== Description and history ==
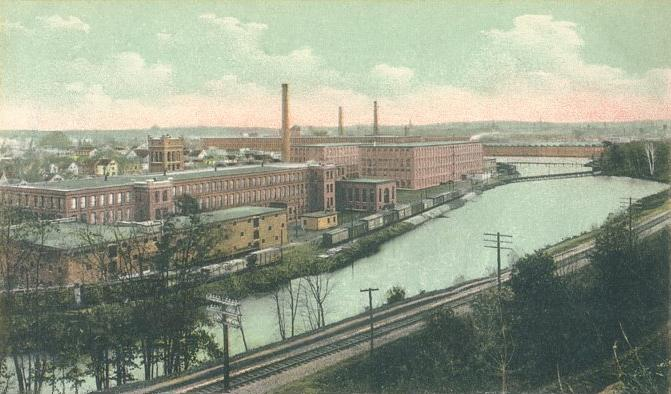
Arlington Mills in 1907

The Arlington Mills occupy 75 acres (30 ha) of land straddling the boundary between Lawrence and Methuen. It is bounded on the east by Broadway, a historic post road, and on the west by the Spicket River, which originally supplied it with power. The complex has 23 buildings, most of which are of brick construction. The largest is the 1896 wool-combing mill, which is 750 feet (230 m) long, while the 1906 worsted weaving mill is 600 feet (180 m) long.

The first industrial use of this site was about 1820, when Abiel Stevens built a wood-frame factory in which piano cases were built. Stevens' first mill burned in 1855, and he rebuilt the following year. The Arlington Mills Company began operation in 1865, after purchasing this location; its investors were owners of Lawrence's other mill operations. In 1880 their 1865 building was demolished and replaced by a new brick structure, now termed the worsted-weave shed which is one of the surviving buildings. The complex grew over the years, and was by 1925 one of the largest textile factories in the state. During World War I it supplied large quantities of flannel and wool shirting to the United States Army. The Arlington Mills Company suffered financial reverses during the Great Depression, and closed its doors in 1952.

== See also ==
- National Register of Historic Places listings in Lawrence, Massachusetts
- National Register of Historic Places listings in Methuen, Massachusetts
- National Register of Historic Places listings in Essex County, Massachusetts
