= Downtown Lawrence Historic District =

Historic district in Massachusetts, United States

- U.S. National Register of Historic Places
- U.S. Historic district
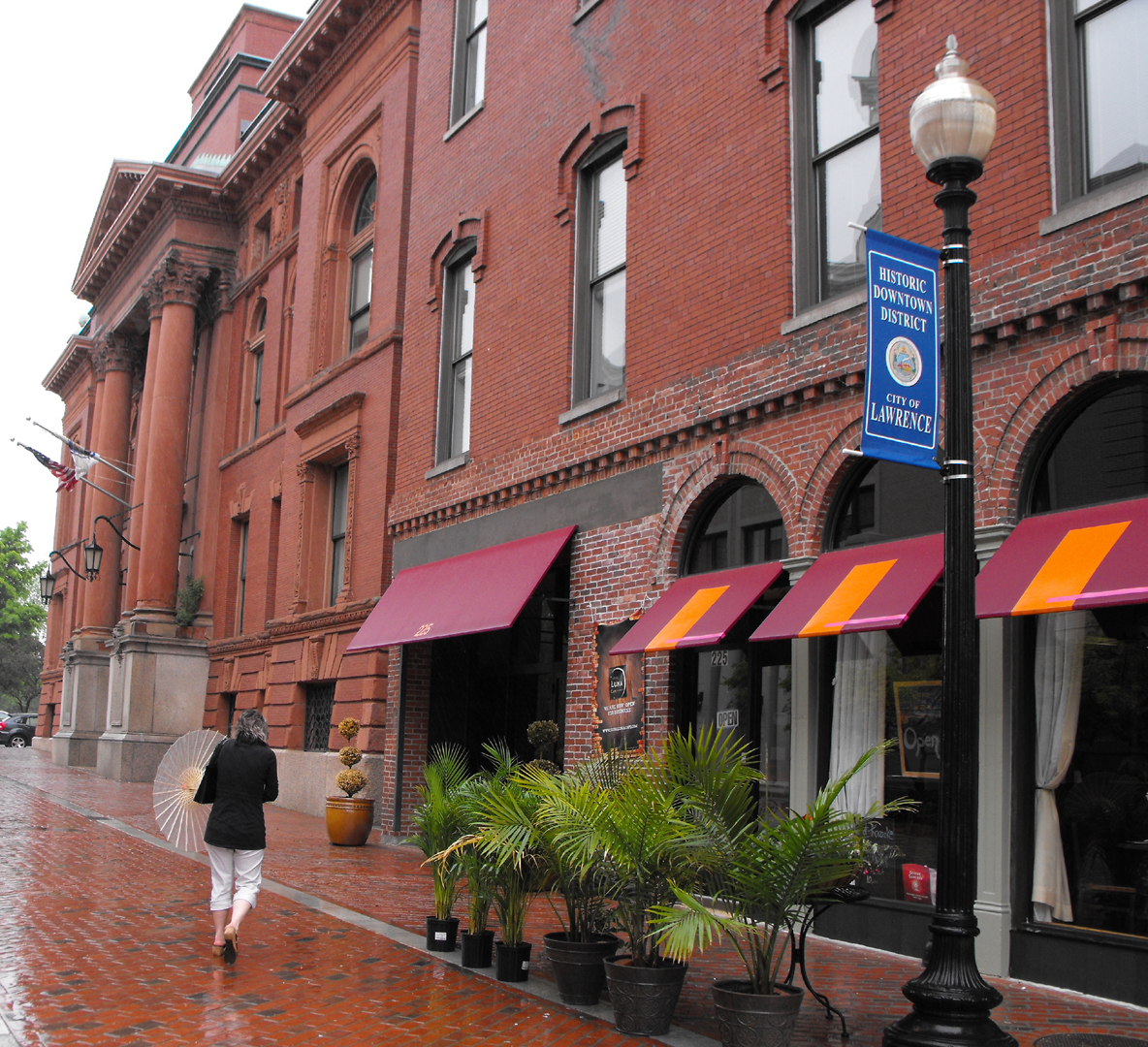

- Location within Massachusetts Location within the United States
- Location: Lawrence, Massachusetts
- Coordinates: 42°42′32″N 71°9′38″W
- Built: 1846
- Architect: multiple
- Architectural style: Greek Revival, Late Victorian, Italianate
- NRHP reference No.: 79000329
- Added to NRHP: November 1, 1979

The Downtown Lawrence Historic District is a historic district roughly bounded by MA 110, Methuen, Lawrence and Jackson Streets in Lawrence, Massachusetts. The district encompasses the historic civic and commercial heart of the city, with a series of commercial and civic buildings built mainly between 1880 and 1920, as well as the Campagnone Common, one of the city's largest public parks. Civic buildings, including City Hall and the Essex County Courthouse, face the Common on Common Street, and brick commercial buildings in late 19th-century Romanesque and Queen Anne styles mix with later Colonial and Classical Revival buildings on Essex Street, one block removed from the Common.

The district was added to the National Register of Historic Places in 1979.

== See also ==
- National Register of Historic Places listings in Lawrence, Massachusetts
- National Register of Historic Places listings in Essex County, Massachusetts
