= The Islamic Academy =

The Islamic Academy for Peace
- Arabic: الأكاديمية الإسلامية للسلام

Location
- 125 Oakland Avenue; Methuen, (Essex County), Massachusetts 01844; United States
- Coordinates: 42°43′12″N 71°11′33″W

Information
- Type: Private
- Religious affiliation: Islam
- Established: 2001
- Administrator: Ms. Anisa Jaffar Ali
- Principal: Dr. Jamillah Sherriff
- Faculty: 23 teachers
- Grades: Daycare–8
- Average class size: 15 students
- Student to teacher ratio: 10:1 (National school avg.: 16:1)
- Schedule: 180 days (MA School Avg.: 180 days)
- Hours in school day: 7 hours (MA School Afavg.: 6 hours)
- Team name: TIA
- Accreditation: NEASC
- Newspaper: The Future Light
- % Faculty with Advance Degree: 100%
- Website: theislamicacademy.com

The Islamic Academy for Peace (Arabic: الأكاديمية الإسلامية للسلام ) is a private Islamic elementary and middle school, with grades Daycare, PreK–8 in Methuen, Massachusetts. It had its beginnings in 2001, with a few teachers and a handful of students. Today, the school has grown to have a staff of teachers and over 150 students. The school plans to expand to include a high school..

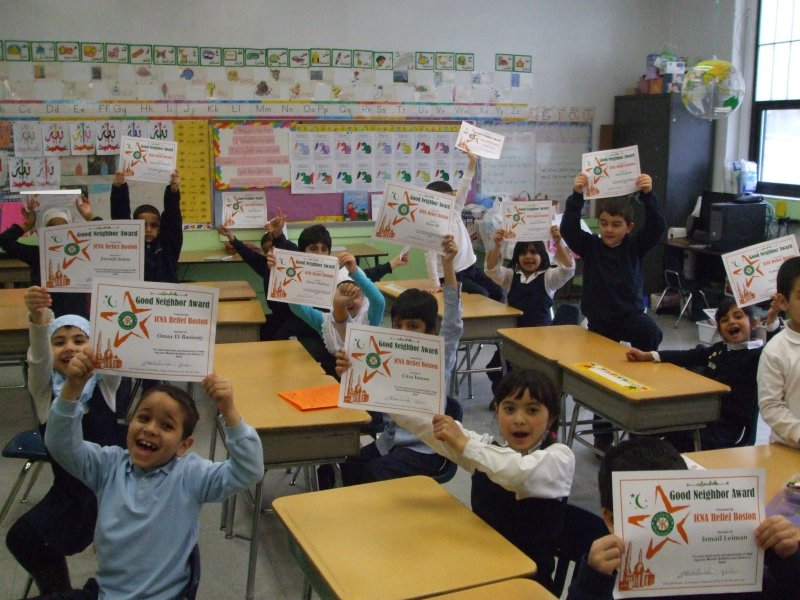
A Classroom

Each day, children pray the mid-day prayer at school. Salat-ul-Jumu'ah, or the Friday prayers, are attended by the upper-grade students at the Selimiye Camii Mosque, located within walking distance.

== Background ==
The school was founded in 2001 by Shaban Catalbas, who has a granddaughter named Zehra Catalbas attending 7th grade. It is located at 125 Oakland Ave, Methuen, Massachusetts.

== Ratings ==
TIA has been rated by many school rating companies, such as Great Schools, Education.com, and Private School Review.

=== Hajj Re-enactment Day, 2007 ===
The Hajj Re-enactment Day of 2007 was covered by the local press, in a feature program, "Sounds of the Season". An exclusive video can be found at the school's site.

=== Jowdy World Knowledge Challenge ===
TIA takes part in an annual world geography competition held at the Lawrence Public Library.

Year	Rank
2007	First
2008	
2009	Second
2010	Second
2011	Second
2012	First
2013	First
