= List of castles in the United States =

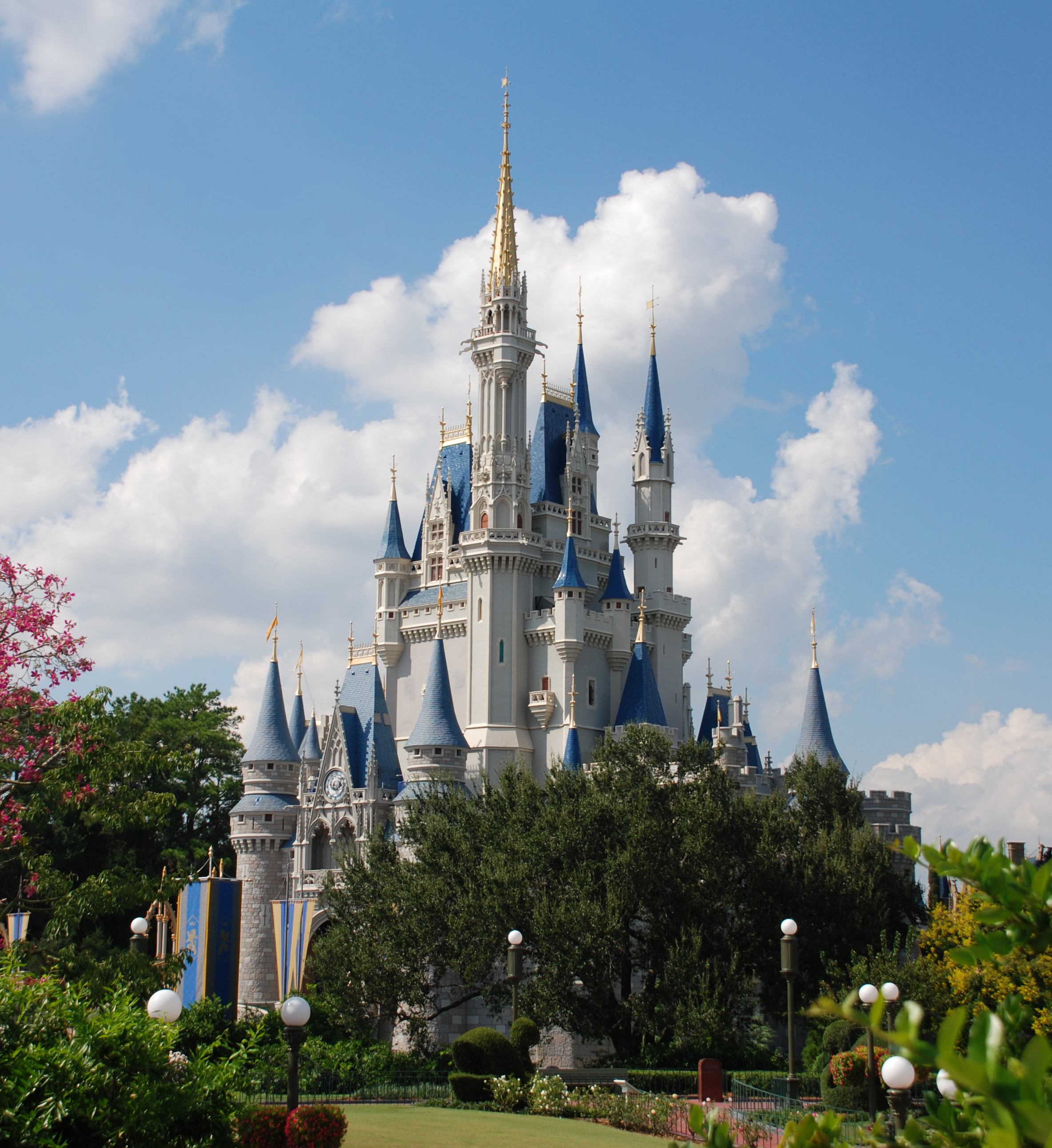
Cinderella Castle

This is a list of castles in the United States. None are actually castles as there was no medieval period in the Western Hemisphere comparable to that in Europe. Castles were obsolete by the time of European settlement. They are primarily country houses, follies, or other types of buildings built to give the appearance of a castle. They are usually designed in the Gothic Revival, Châteauesque, Romanesque Revival, Scots Baronial or Tudor Revival styles. Some, however, are actual fortifications. This list includes items in many states.

== List ==
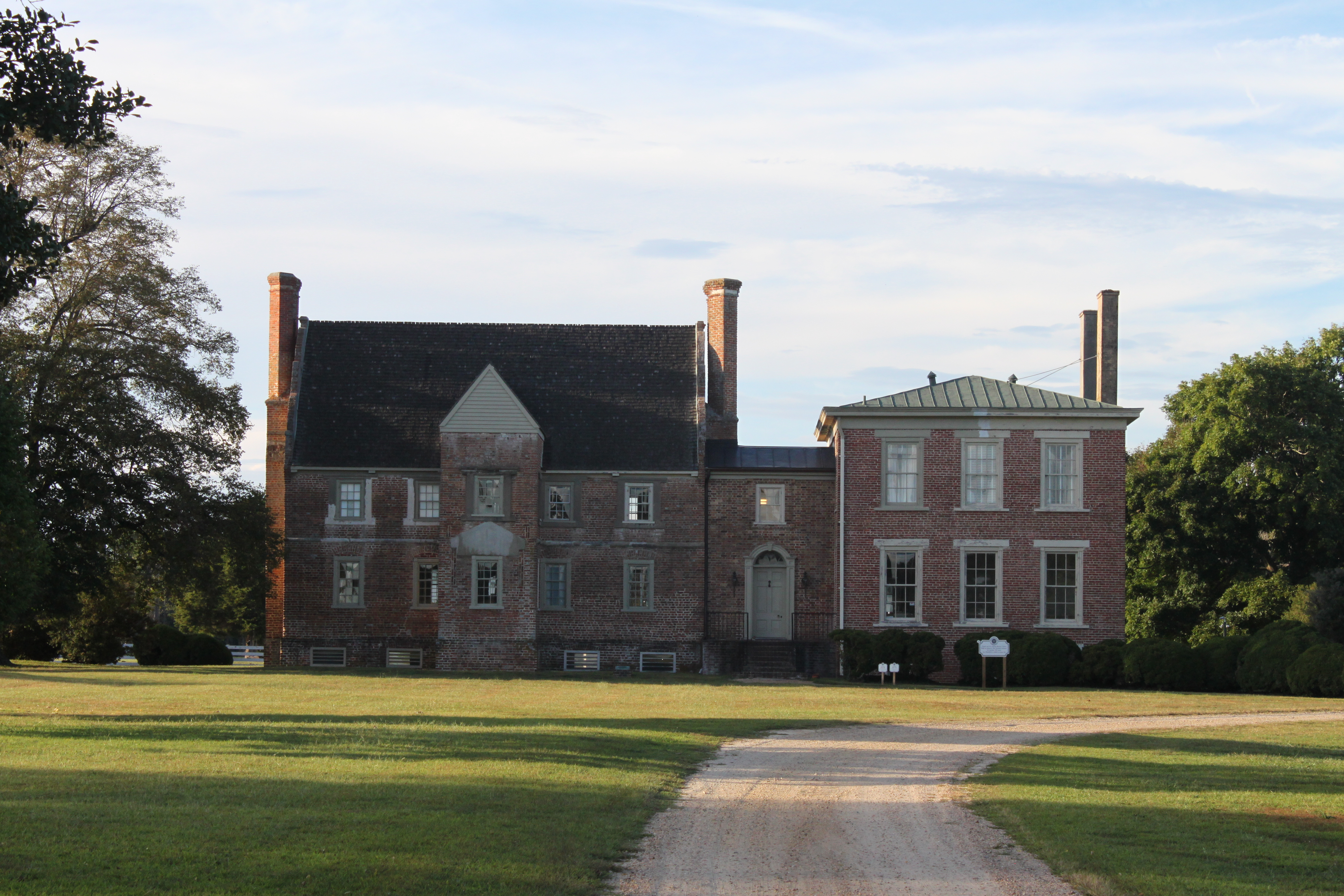
Bacon's Castle, 2014, in Surry County, Virginia

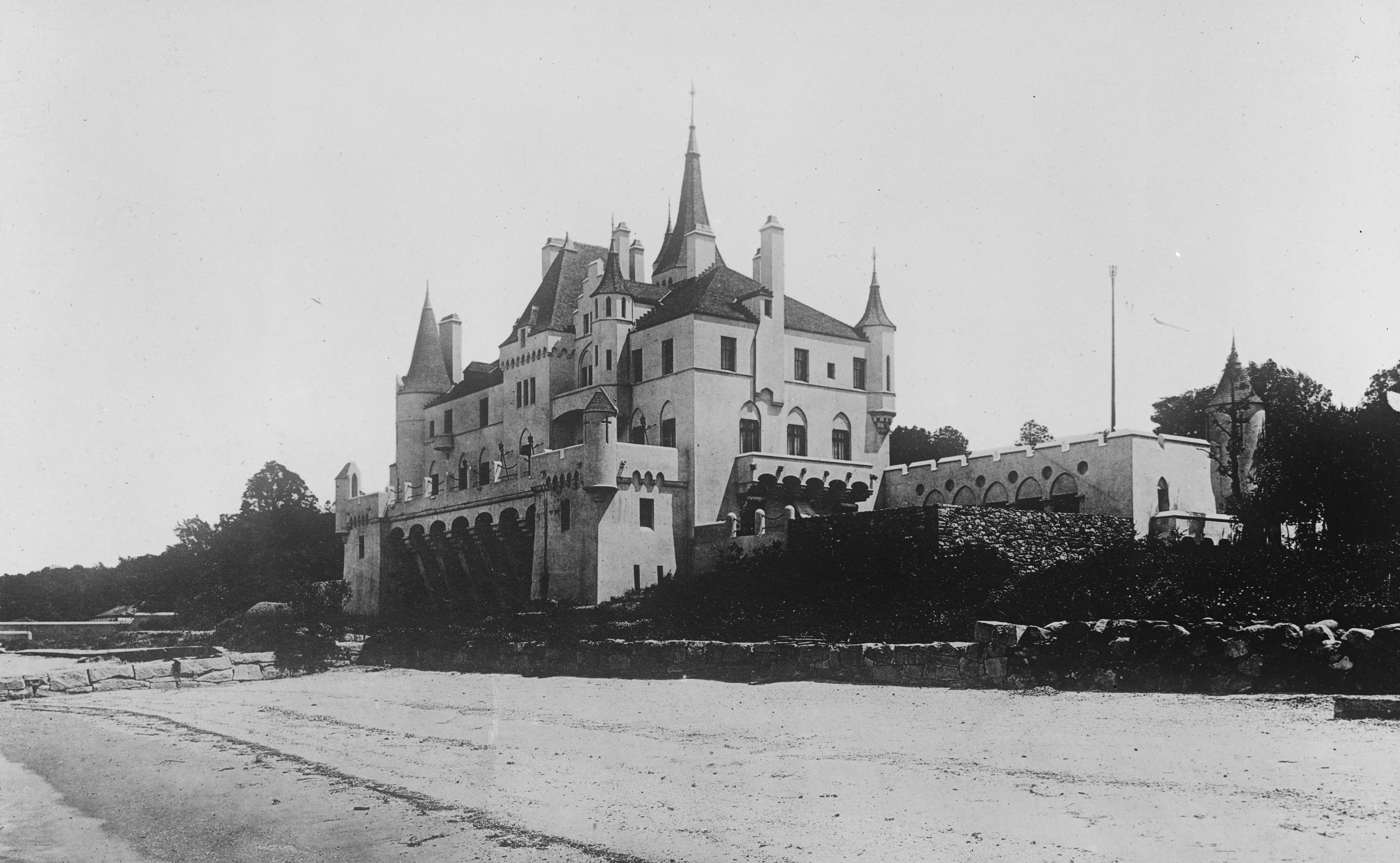
Beacon Towers in Sands Point, New York

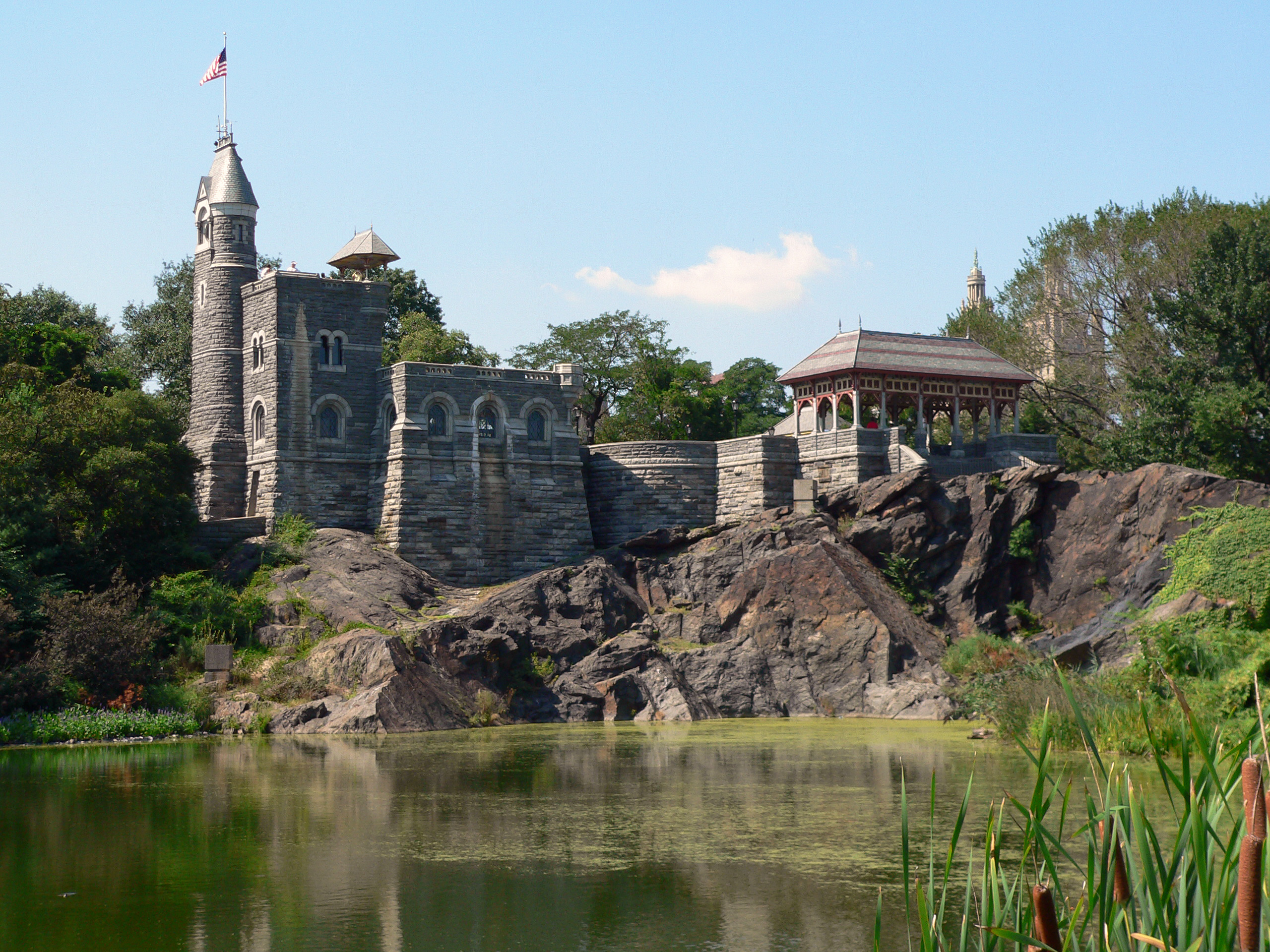
Belvedere Castle, a folly in Central Park in Manhattan, New York City

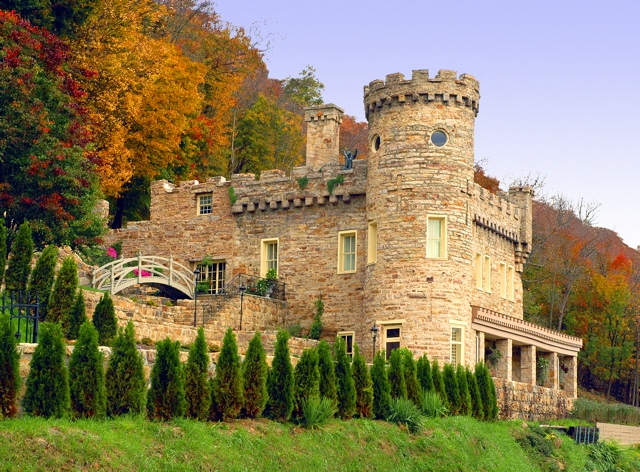
Berkeley Castle in Berkeley Springs, West Virginia

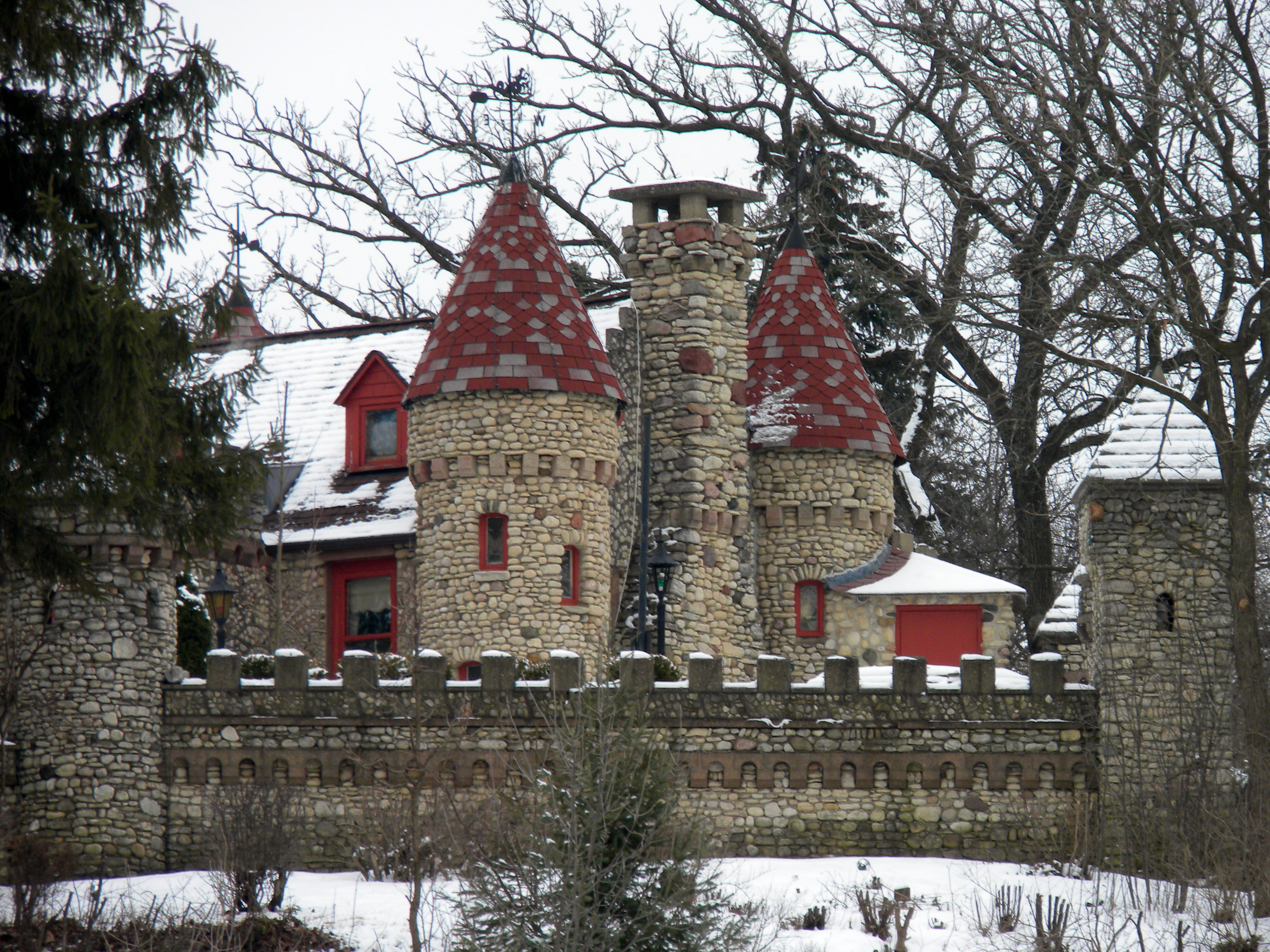
Bettendorf Castle in Fox River Grove, Illinois

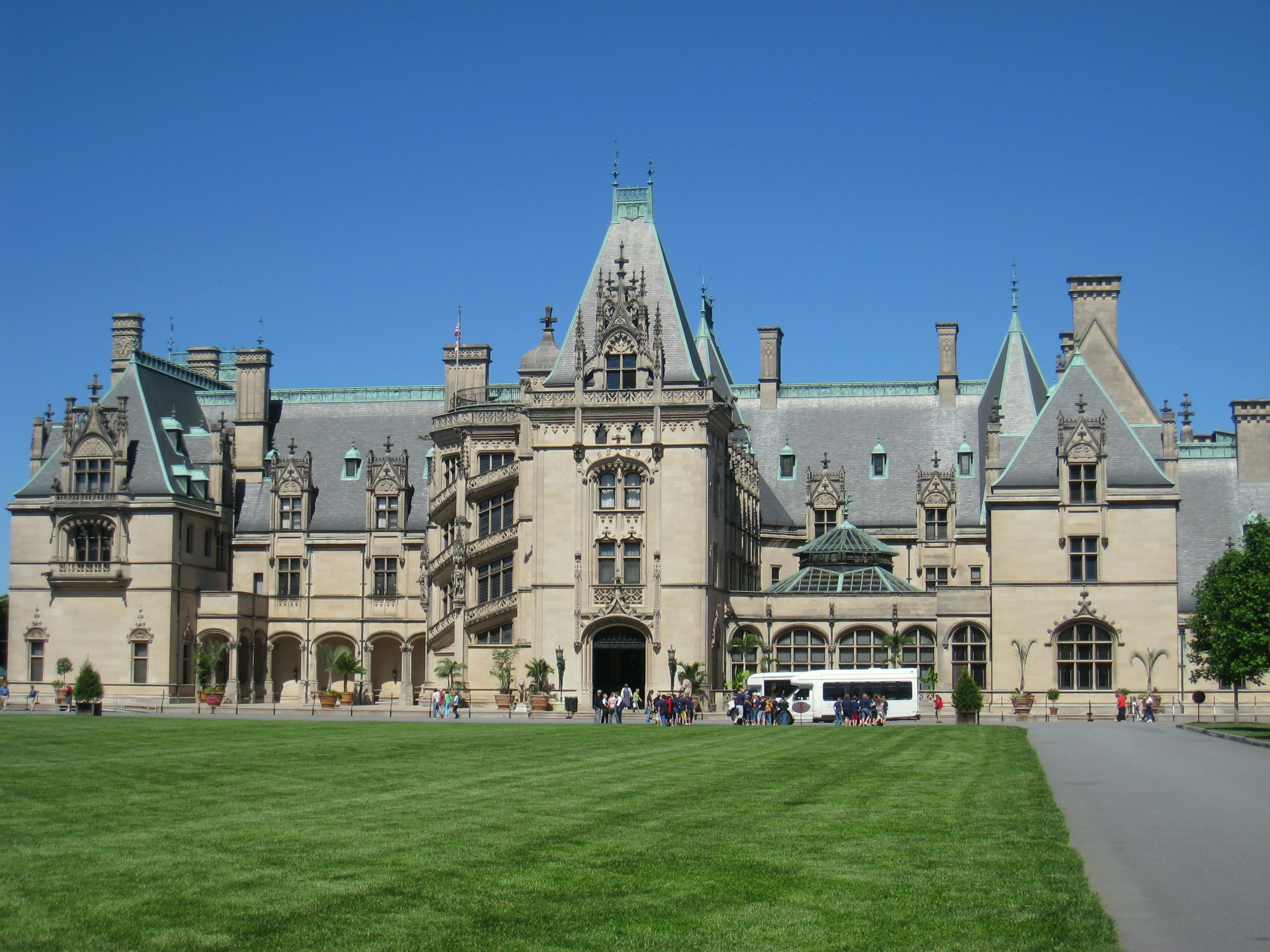
Biltmore in Asheville, North Carolina

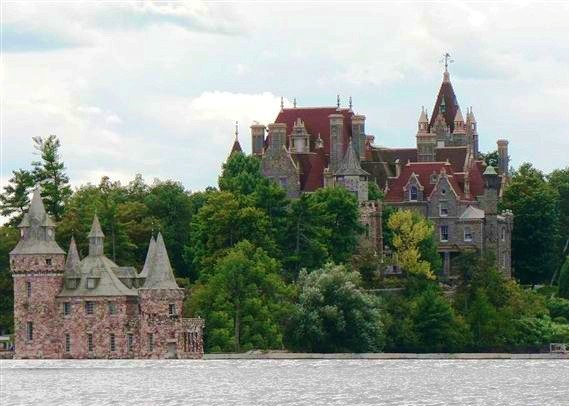
Boldt Castle in Thousand Islands in Heart Island, New York

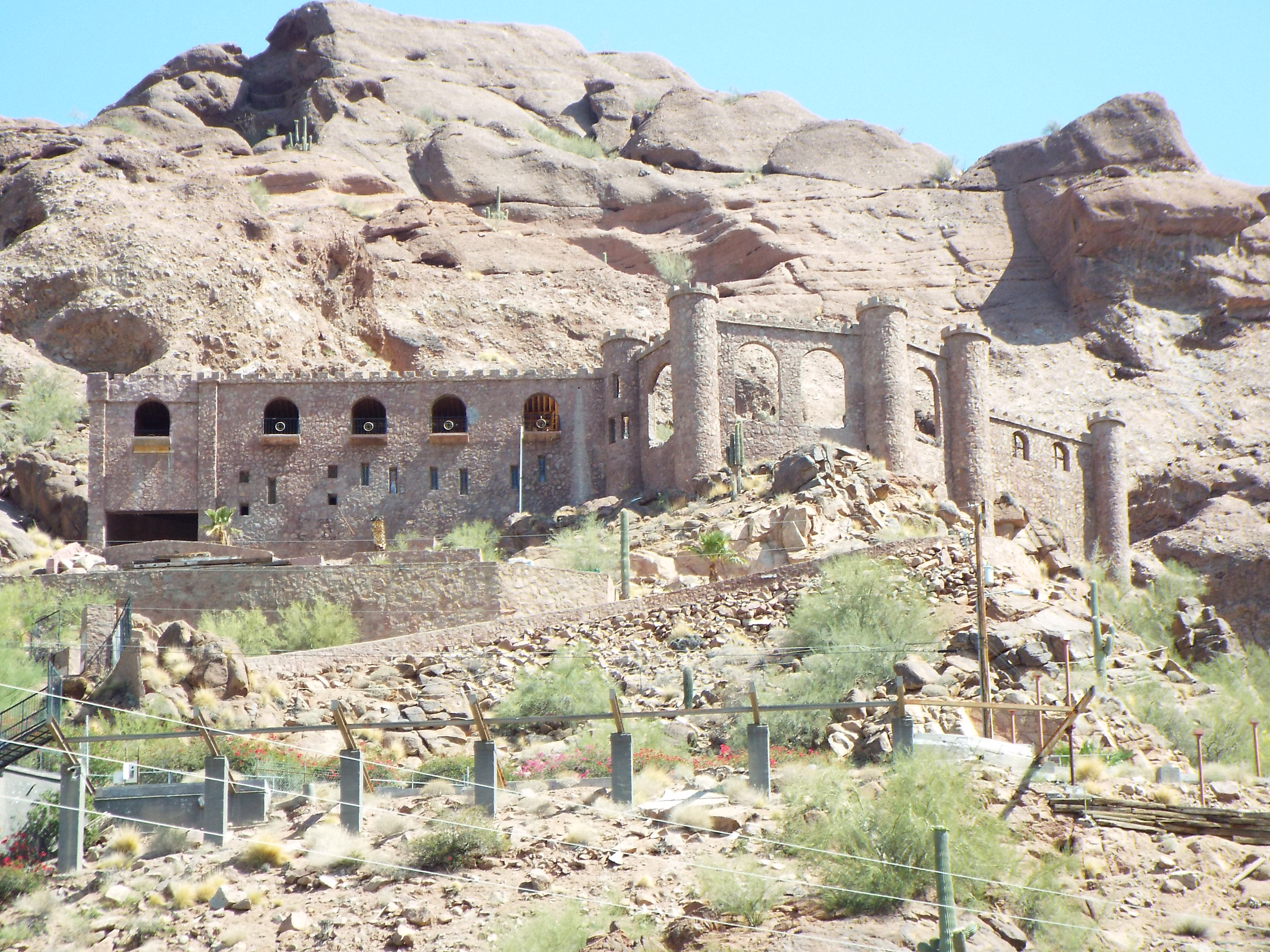
The Camelback Castle/Copenhaver Castle in Phoenix, Arizona

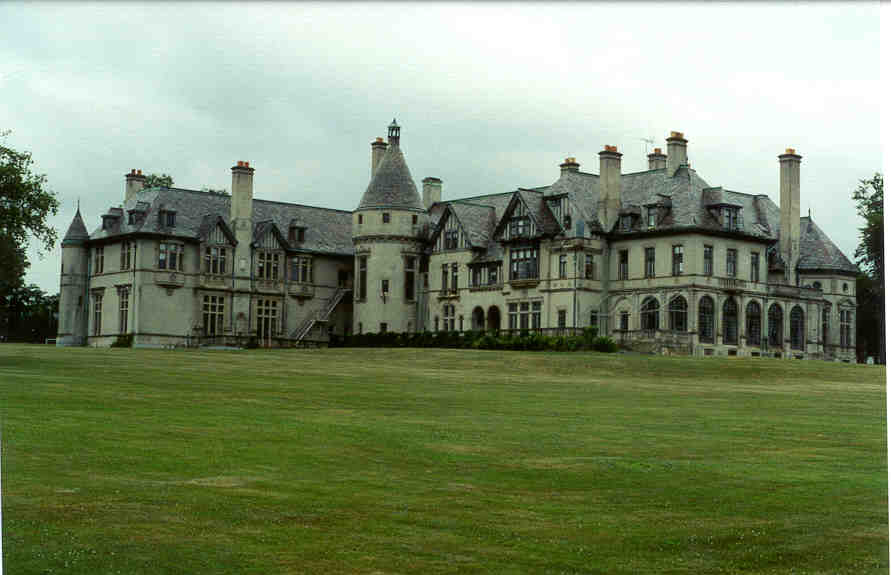
Carey Mansion in Newport, Rhode Island

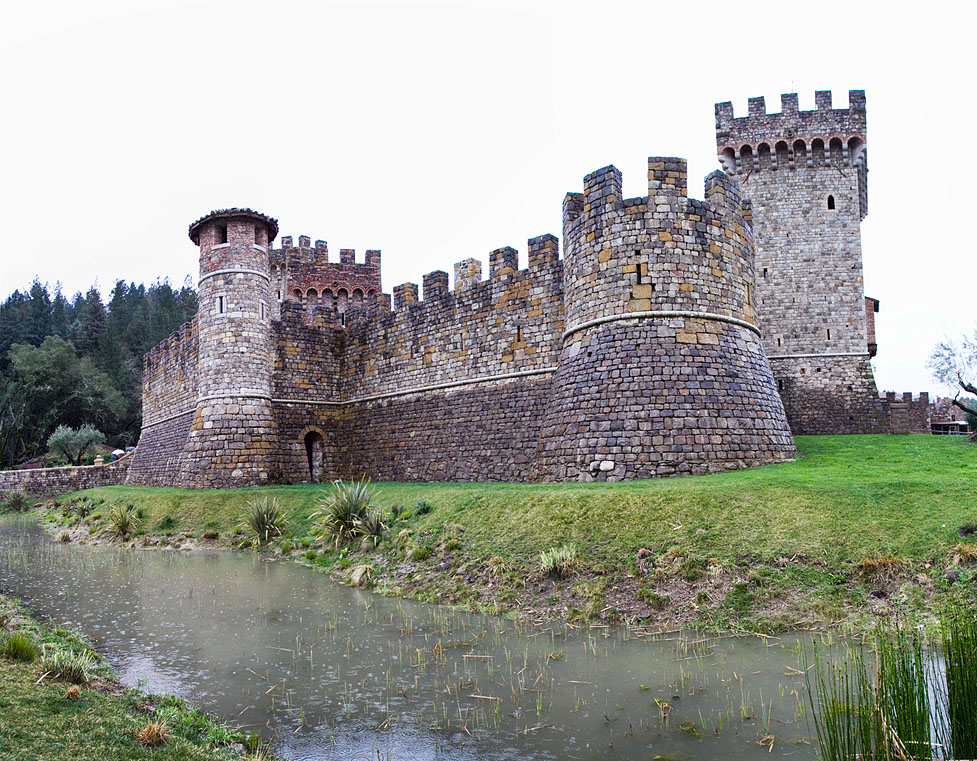
Castello di Amorosa in Calistoga, California

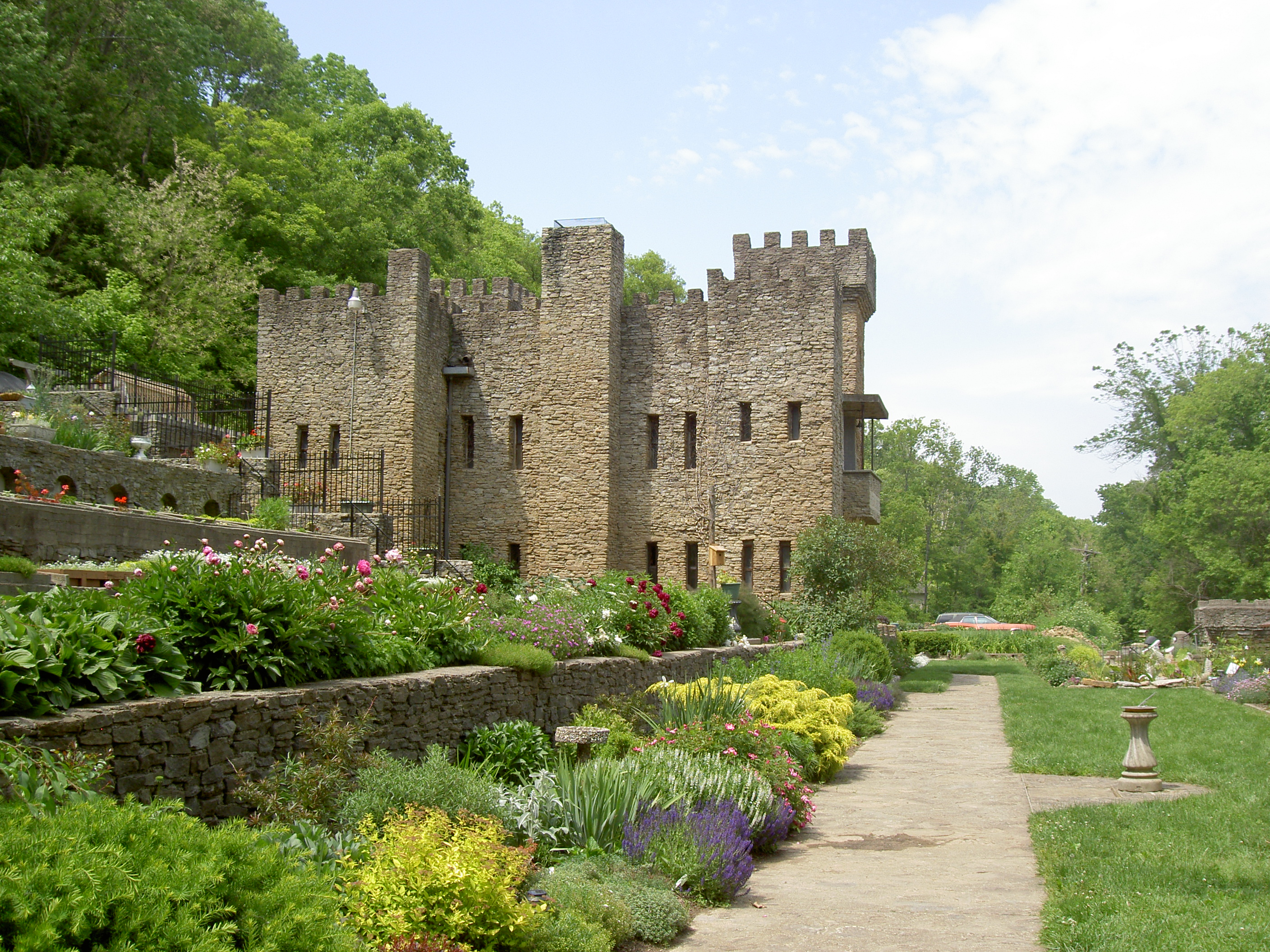
Château Laroche in Loveland, Ohio

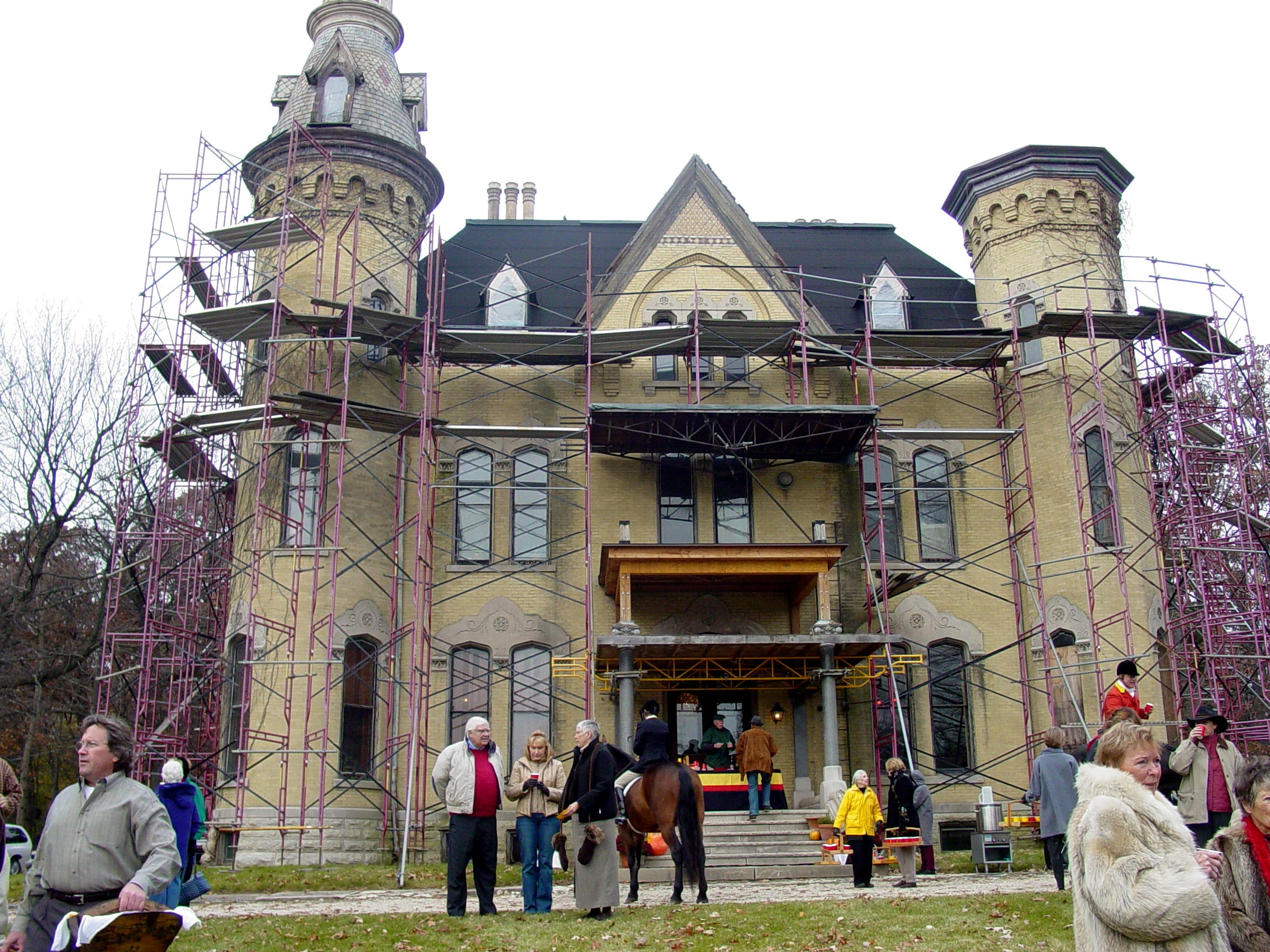
Dunham Castle in Wayne, Illinois

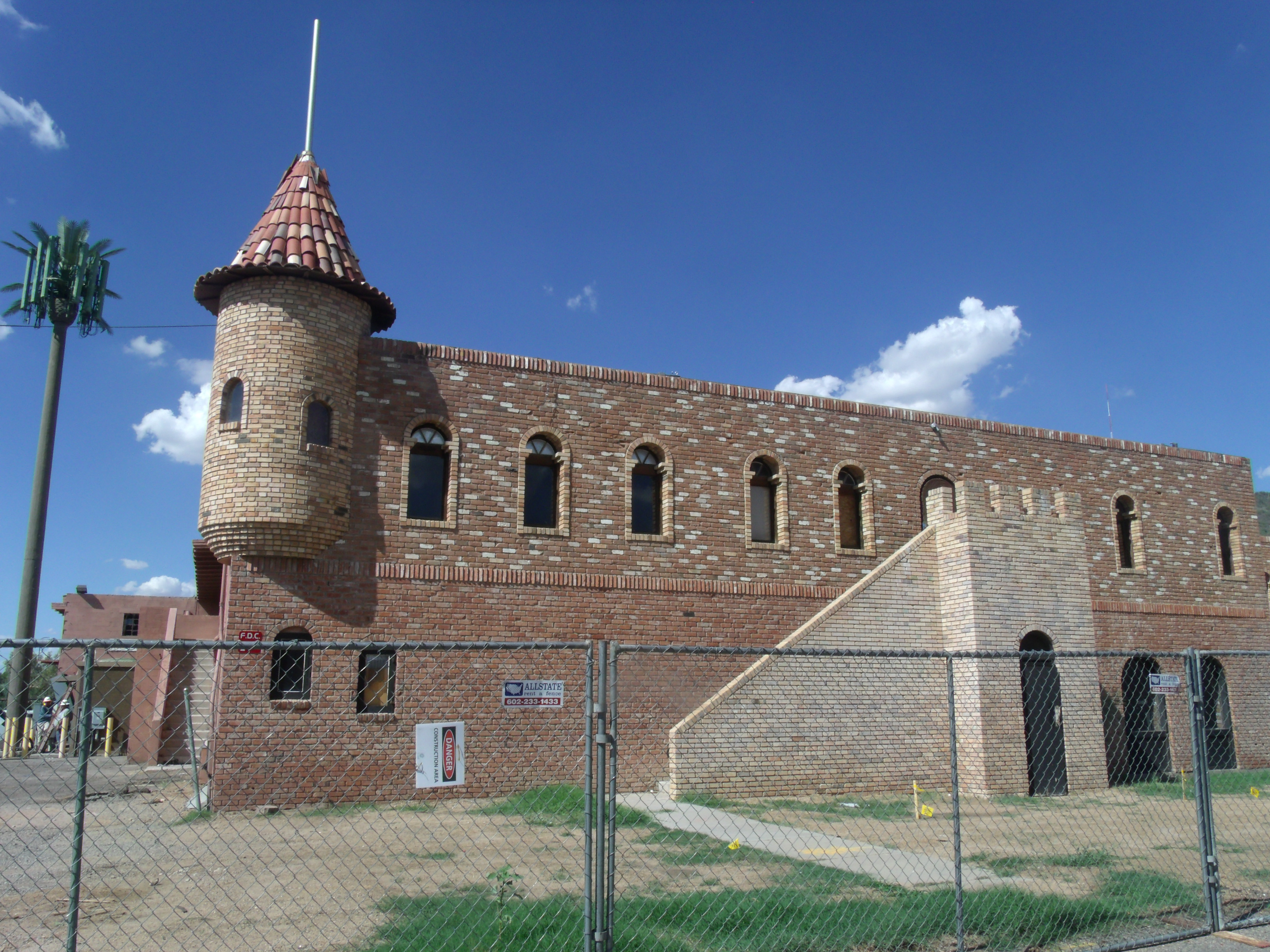
El Cid Castle in Phoenix, Arizona

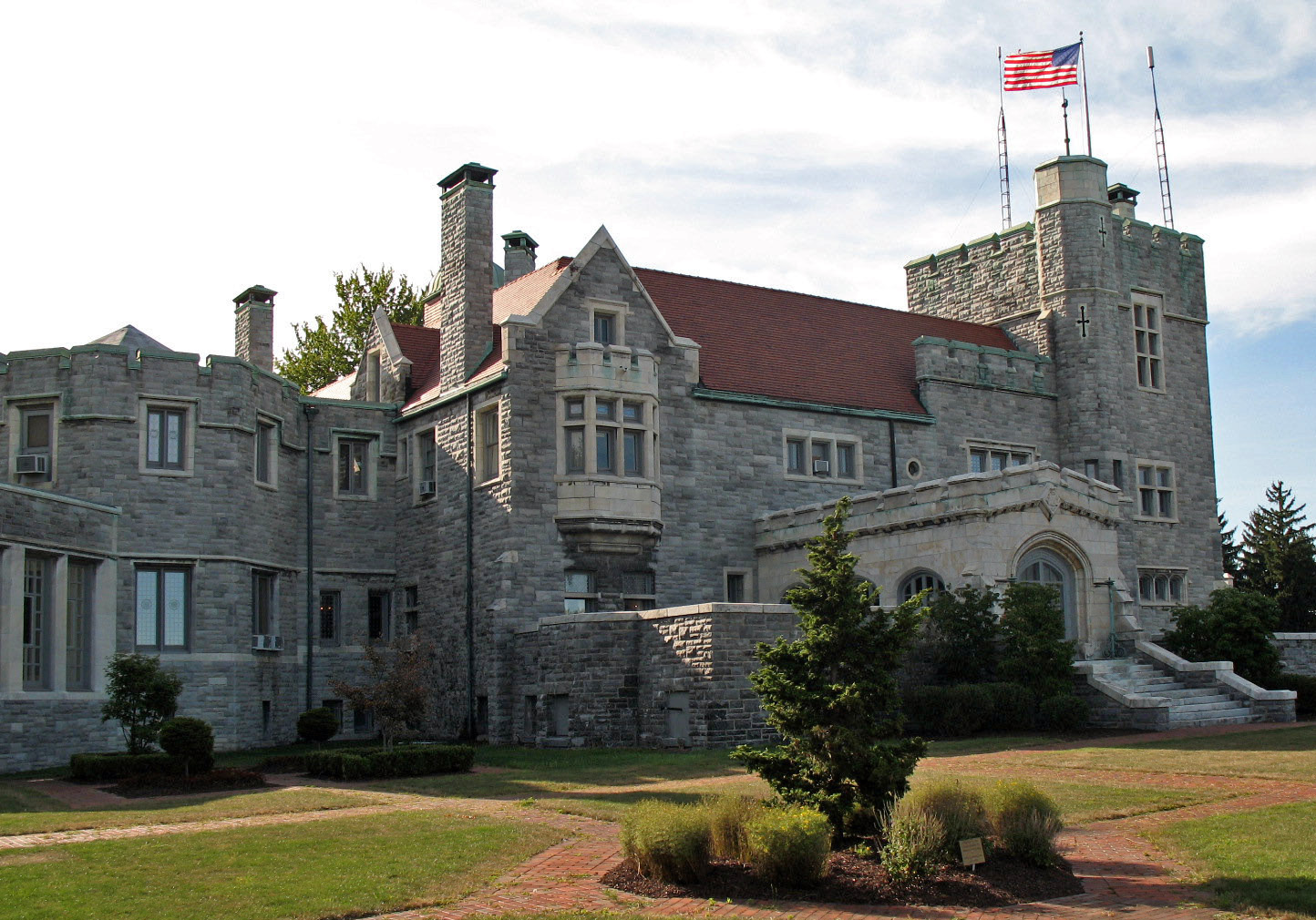
Glamorgan in Alliance, Ohio

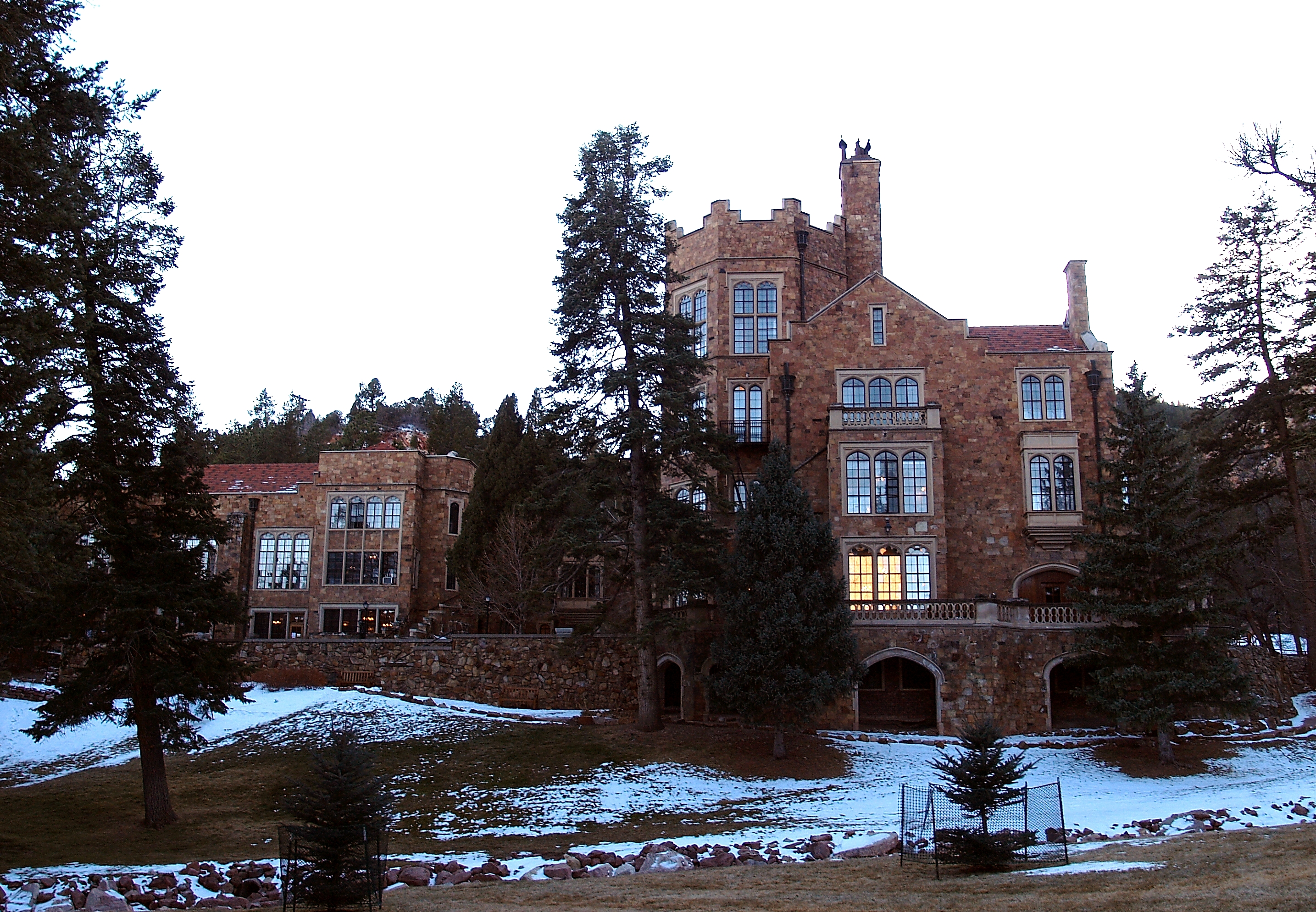
Glen Eyrie in Colorado Springs, Colorado

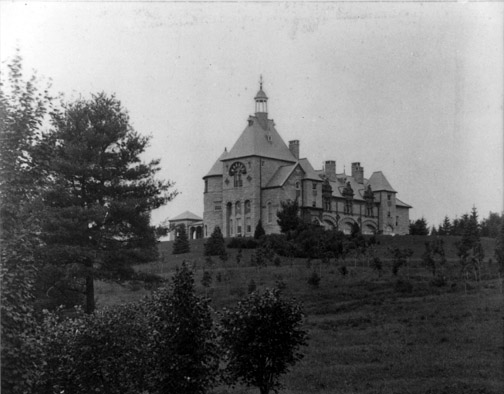
Grey Court in Methuen, Massachusetts

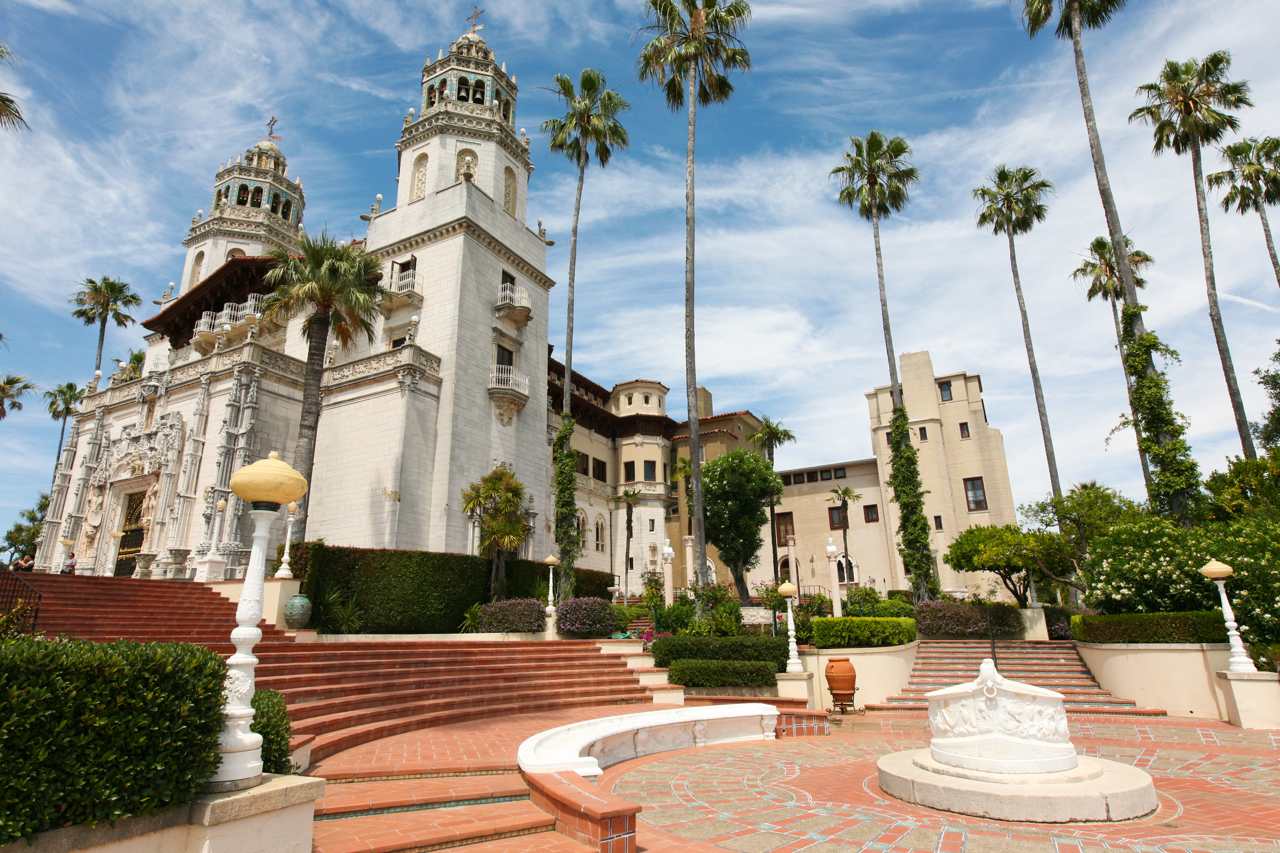
Hearst Castle (Casa Grande), San Simeon, California, from the Esplanade

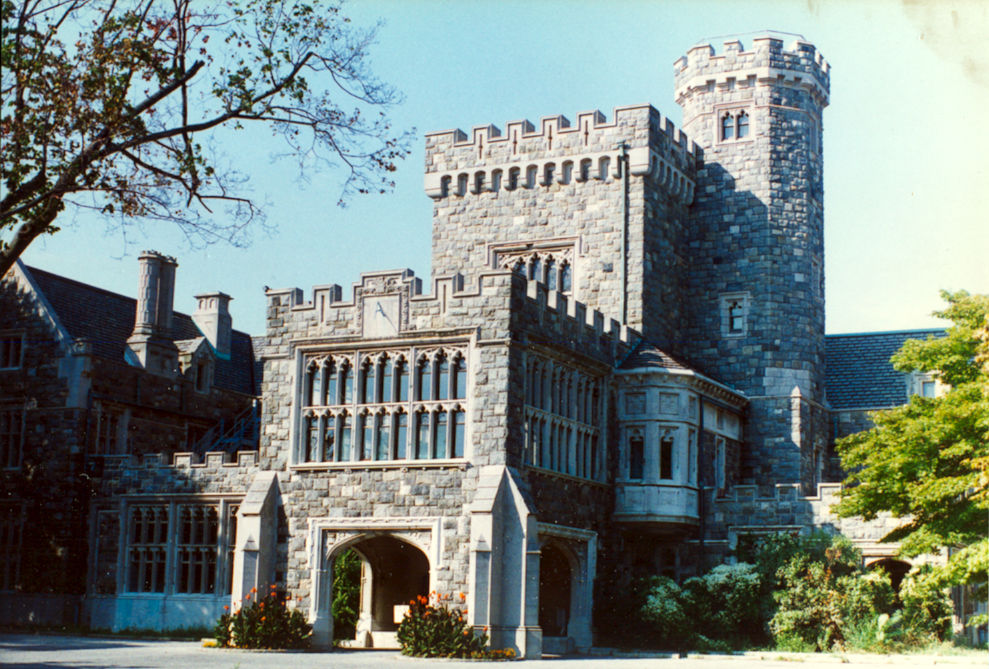
Hempstead House in Sands Point, New York

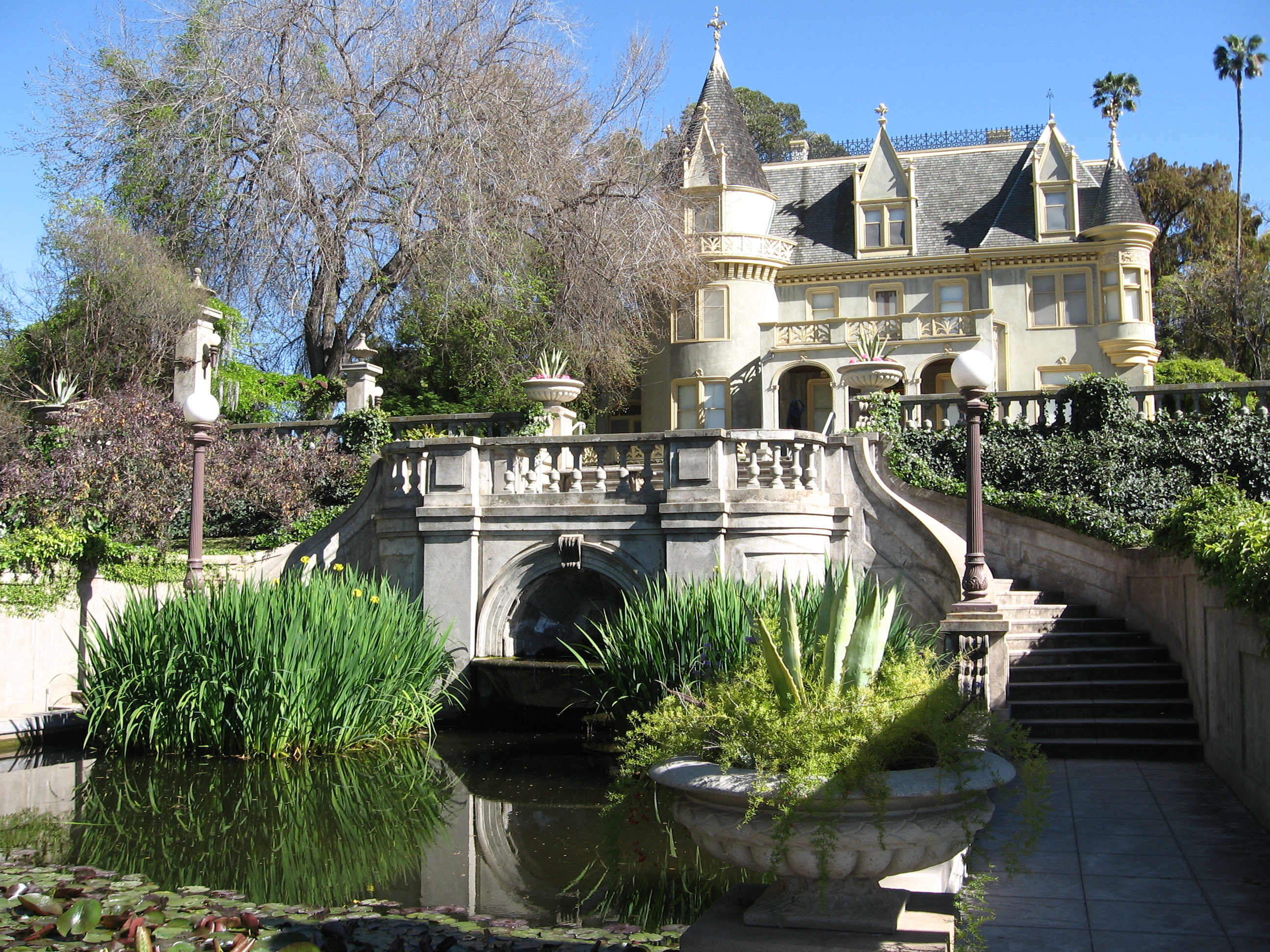
Kimberly Crest in Redlands, California

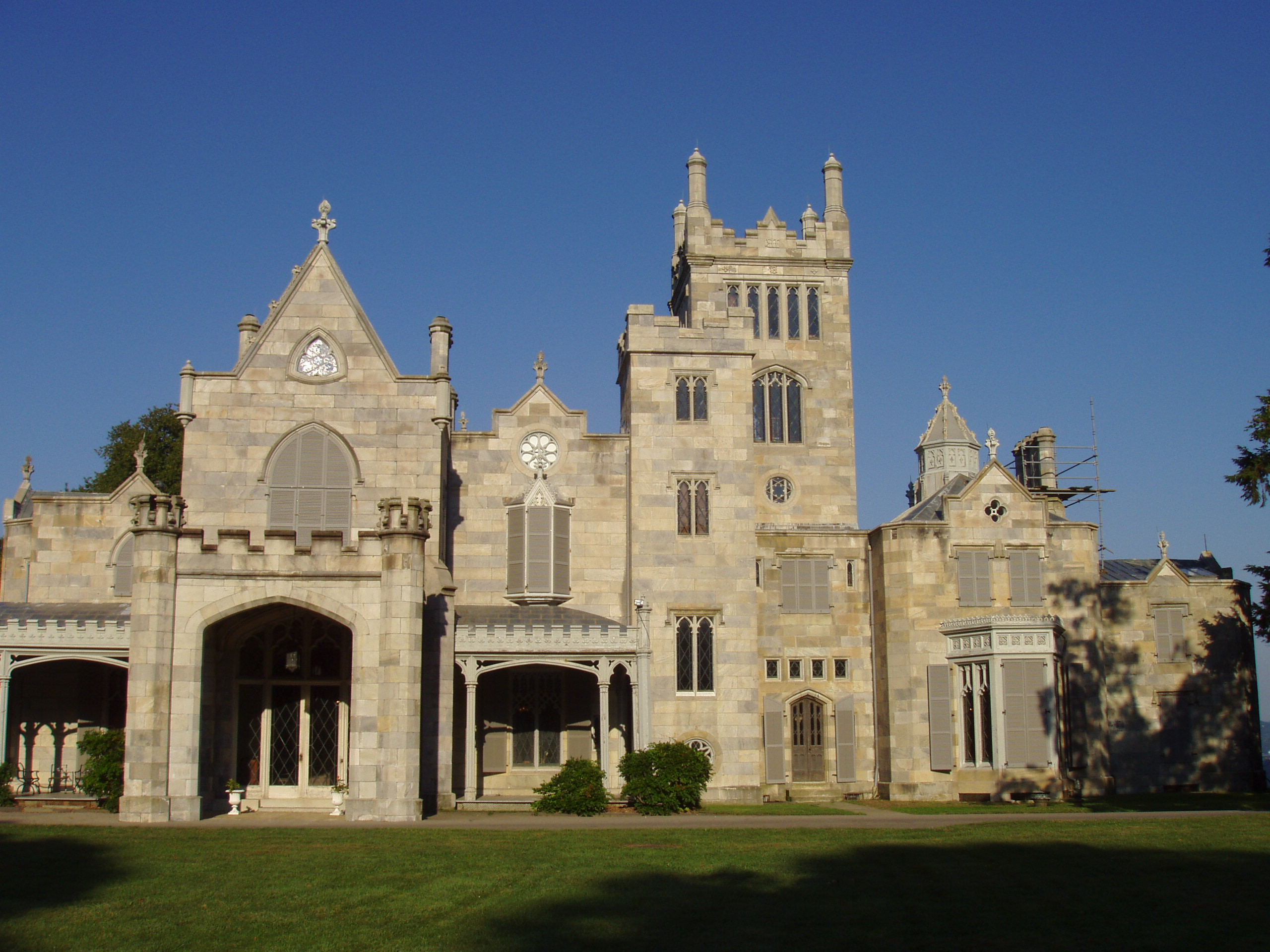
Lyndhurst in Tarrytown, New York

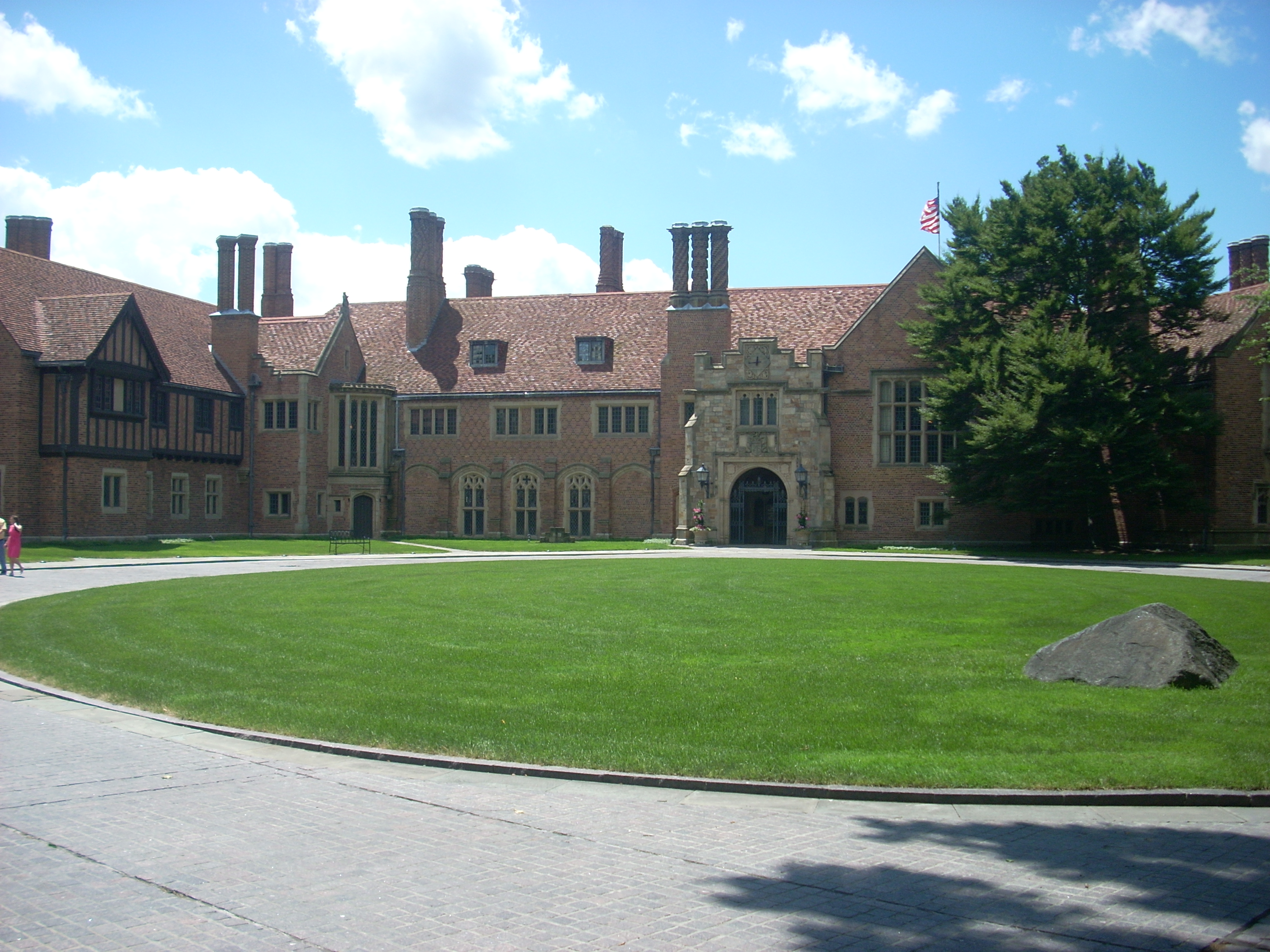
Meadow Brook Hall in Rochester Hills, Michigan

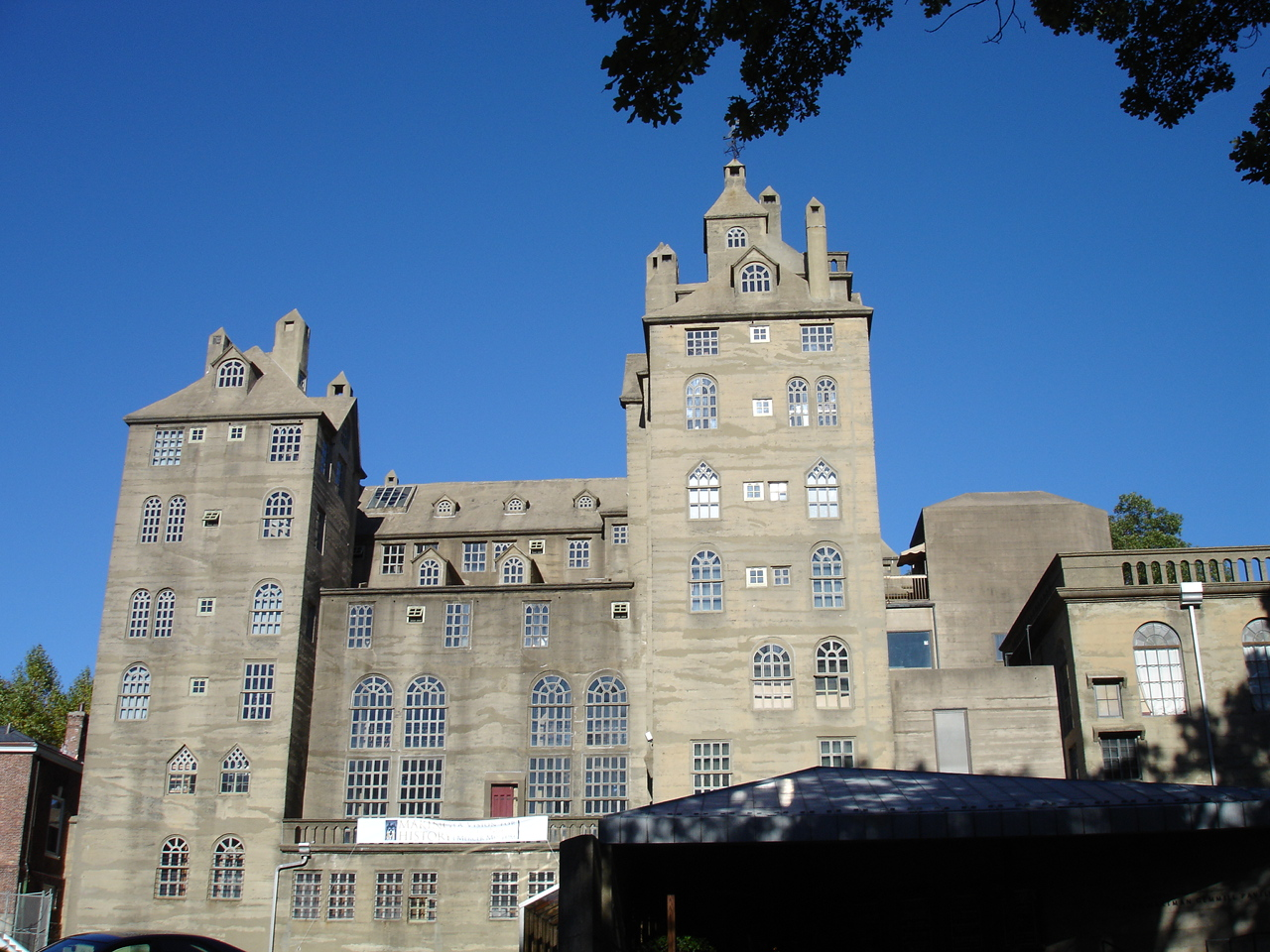
Mercer Museum in Doylestown, Pennsylvania

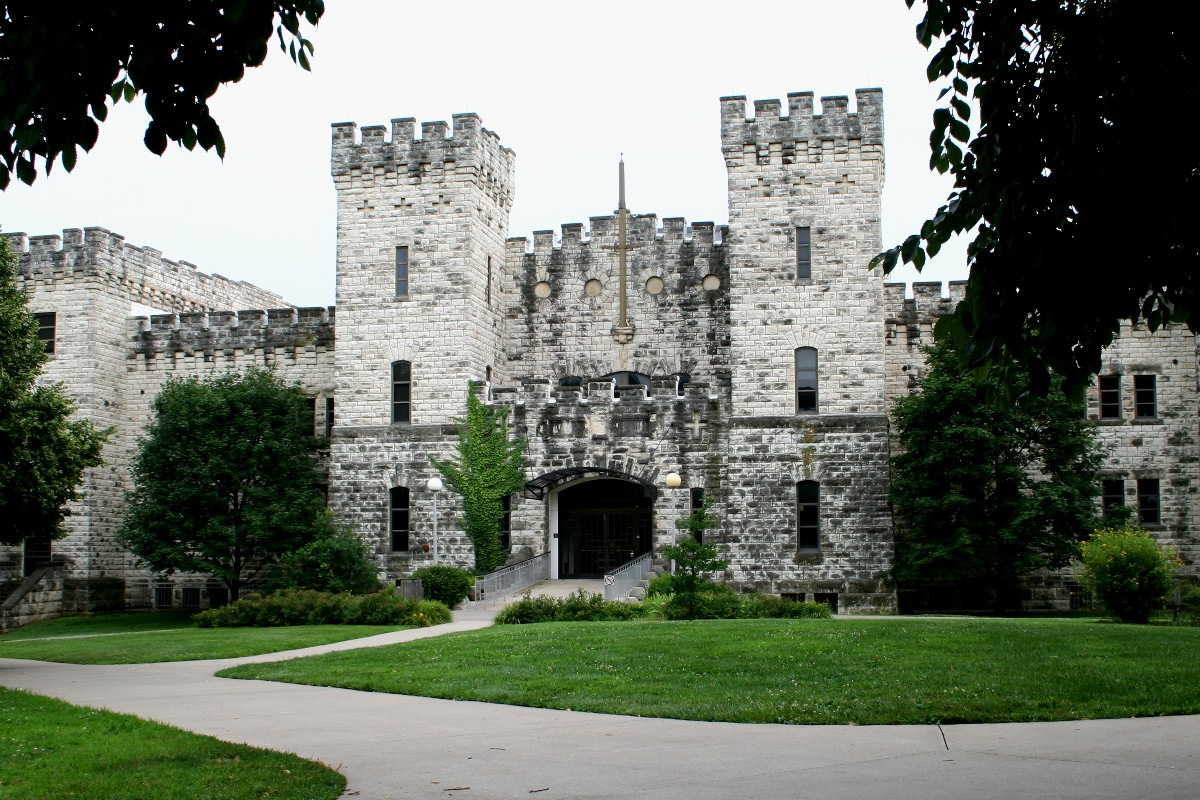
Nichols Hall in Manhattan, Kansas

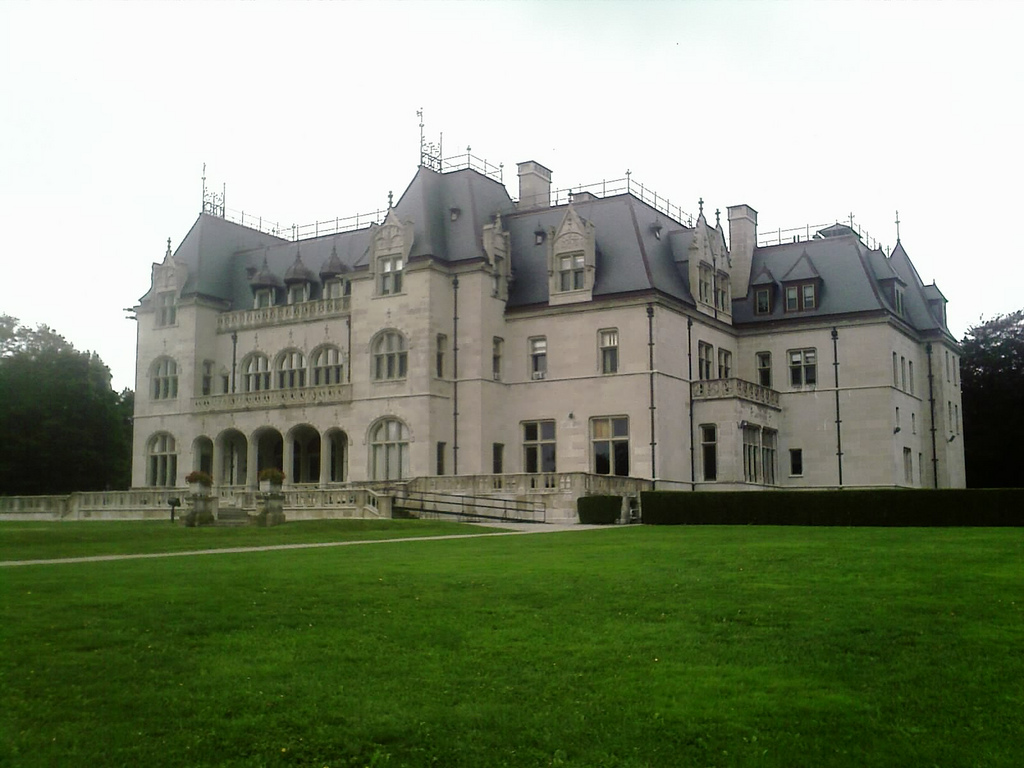
Ochre Court in Newport, Rhode Island

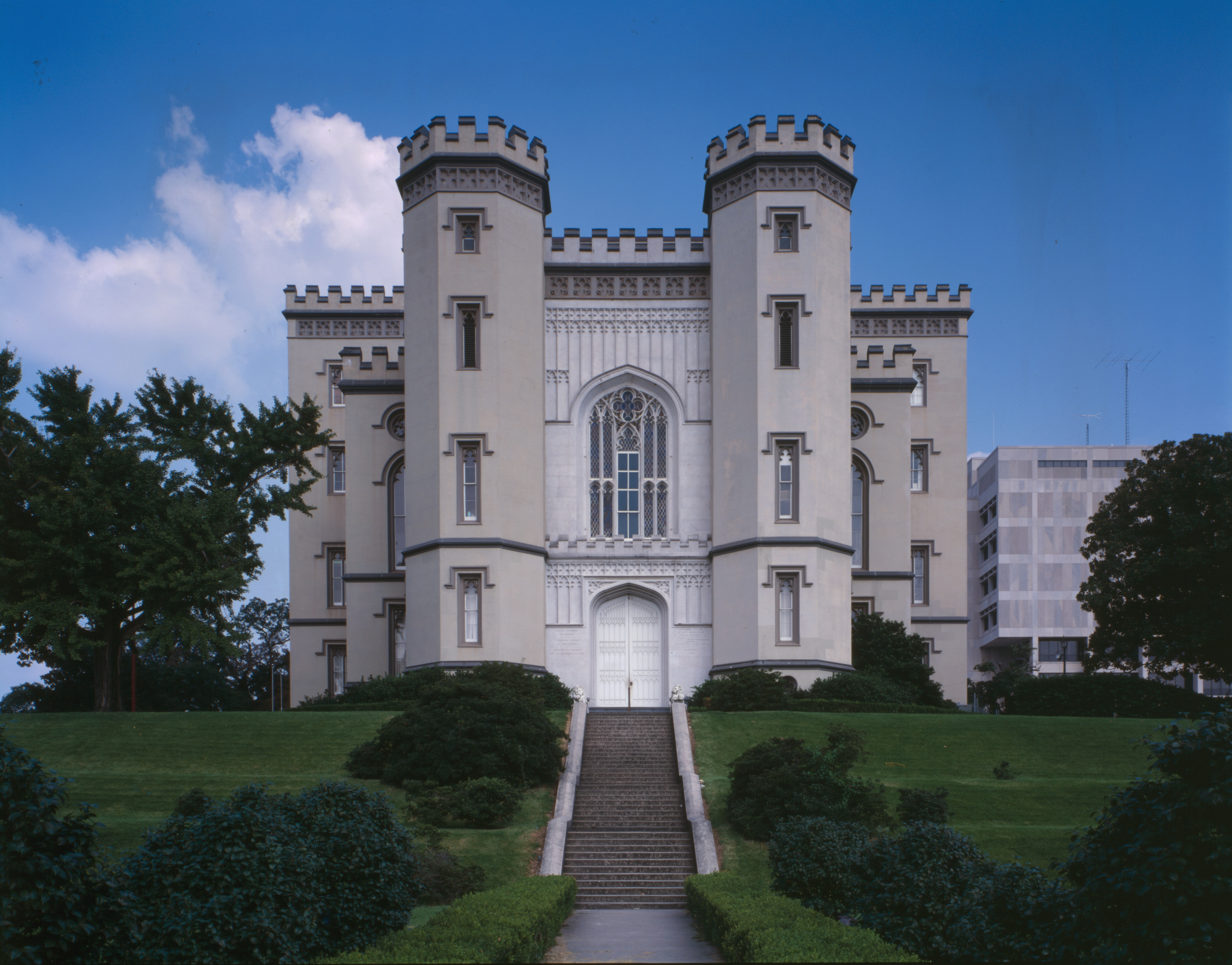
Old Louisiana State Capitol in Baton Rouge, Louisiana

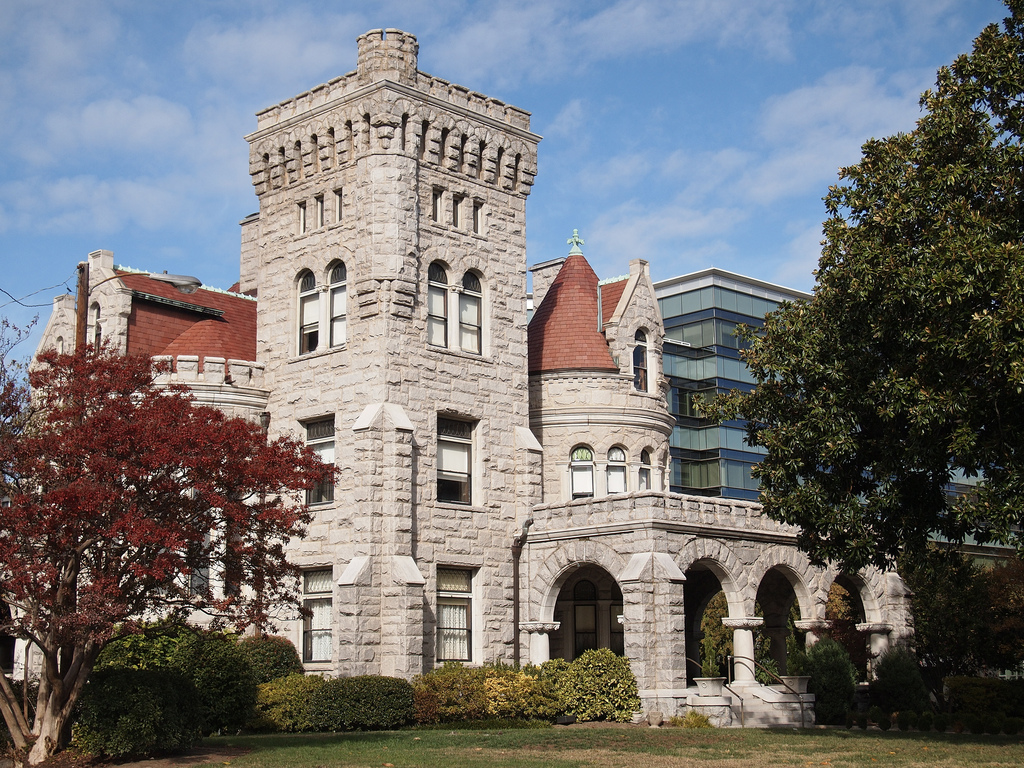
Rhodes Hall in Atlanta, Georgia

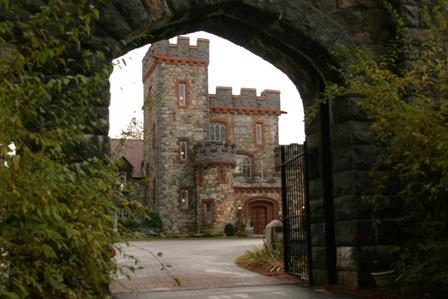
Searles Castle in Windham, New Hampshire

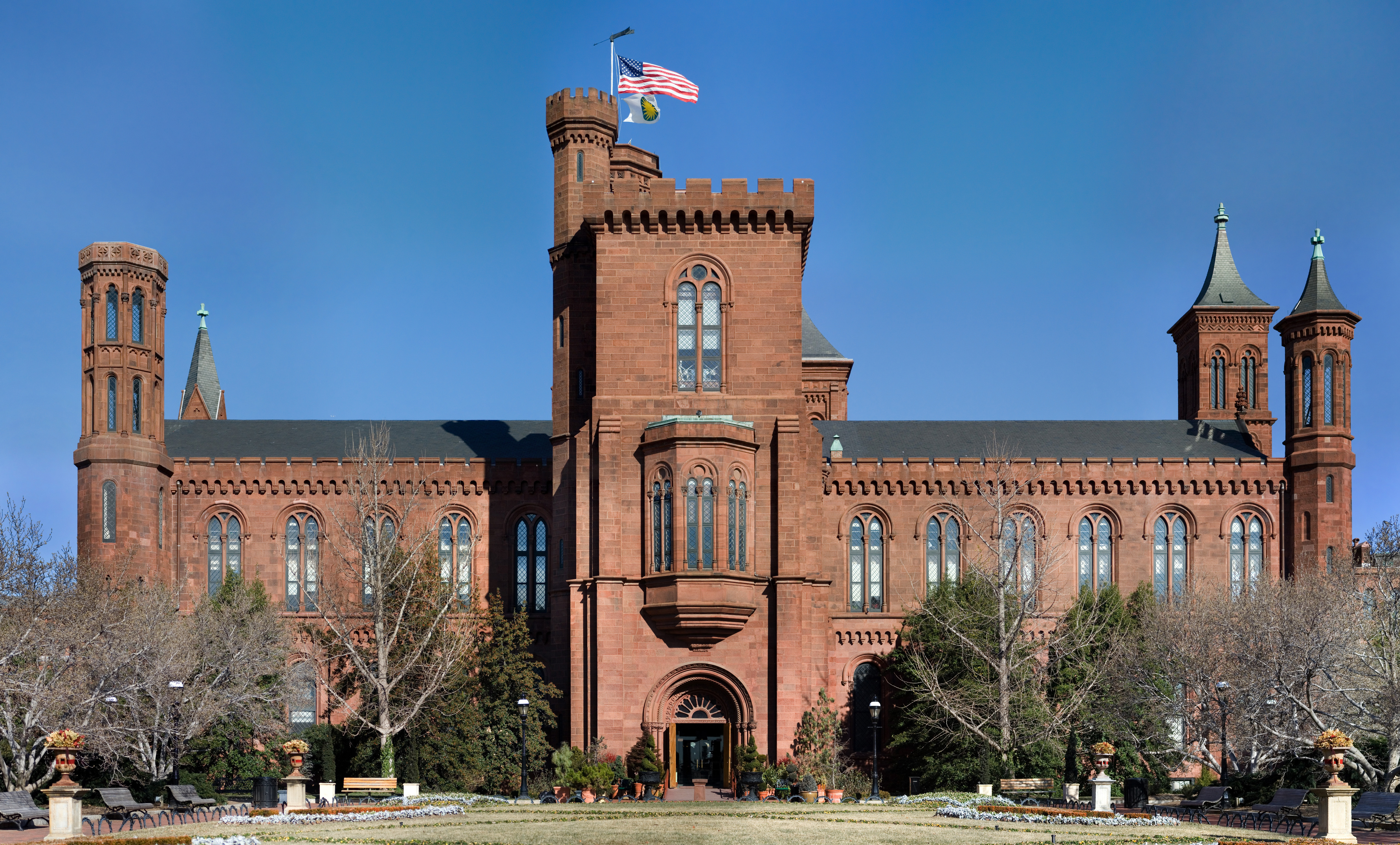
Smithsonian Castle in Washington, D.C.

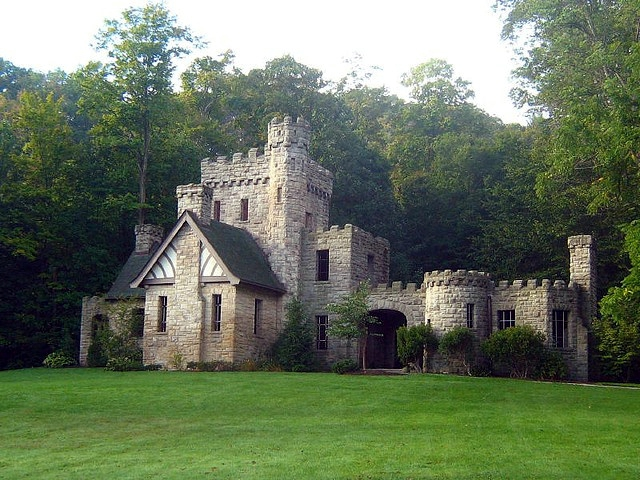
Squire's Castle in Willoughby Hills, Ohio

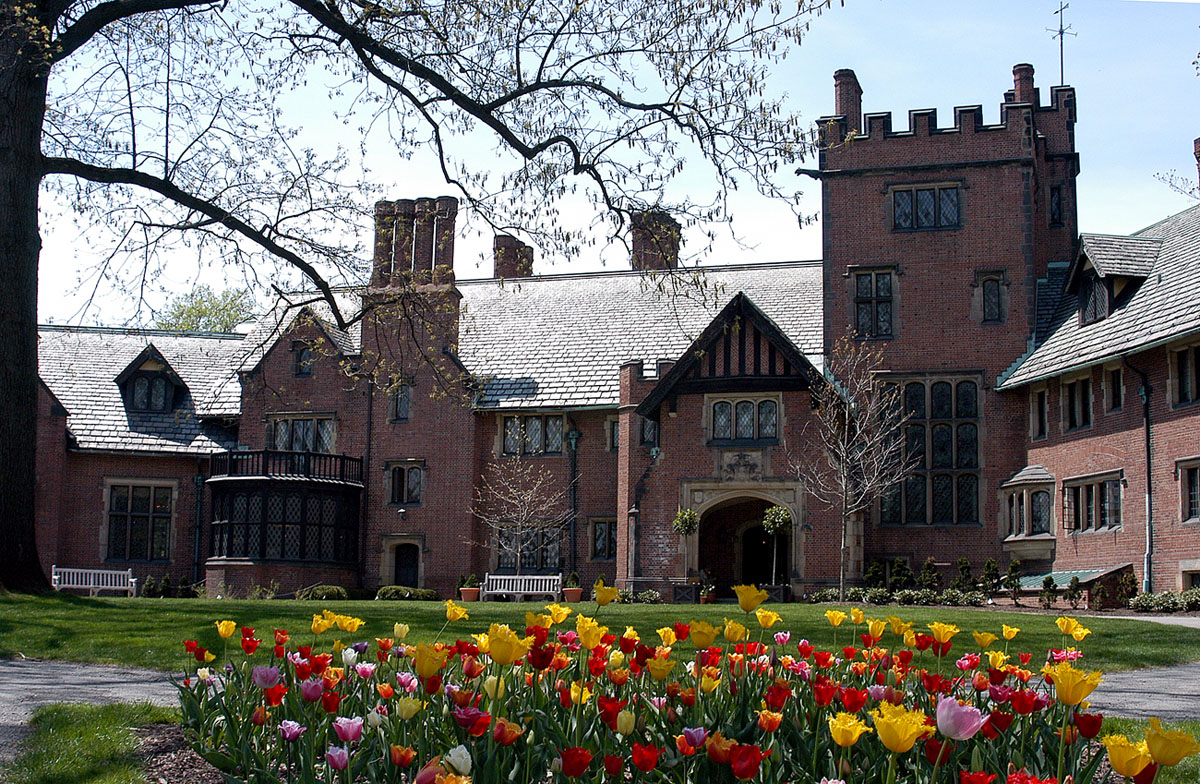
Stan Hywet in Akron, Ohio

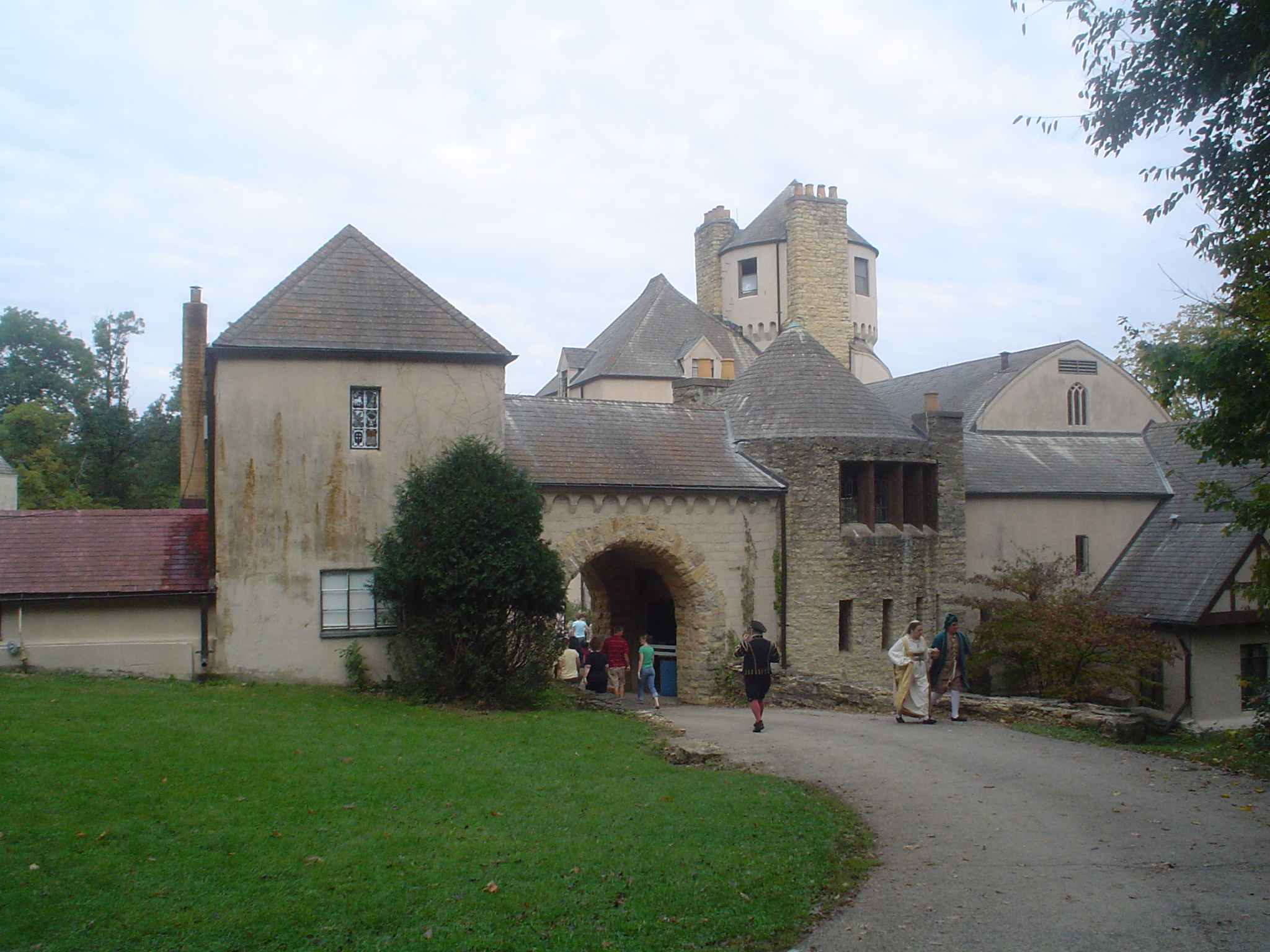
Stronghold Castle in Oregon, Illinois

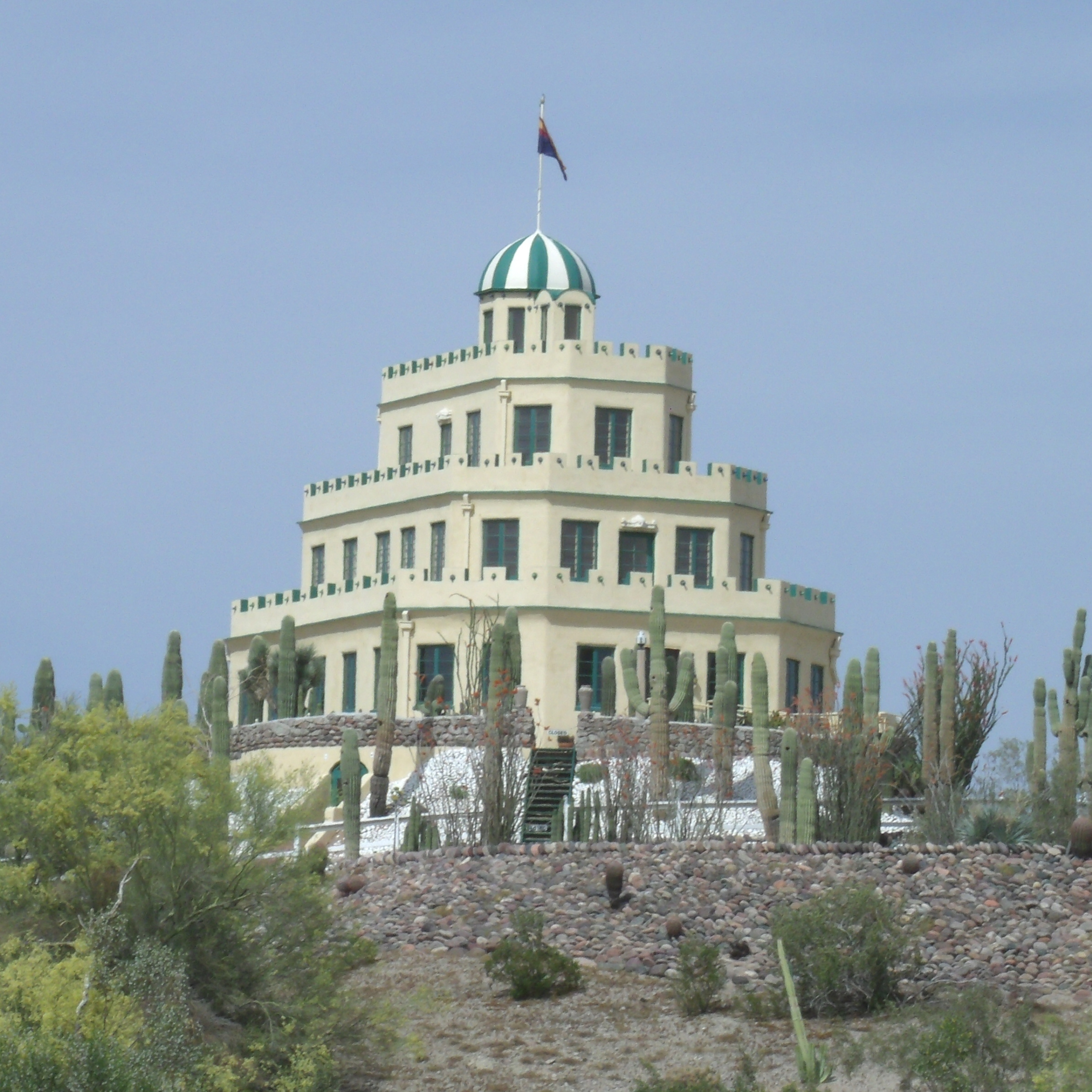
The Tovrea Castle in Phoenix, Arizona

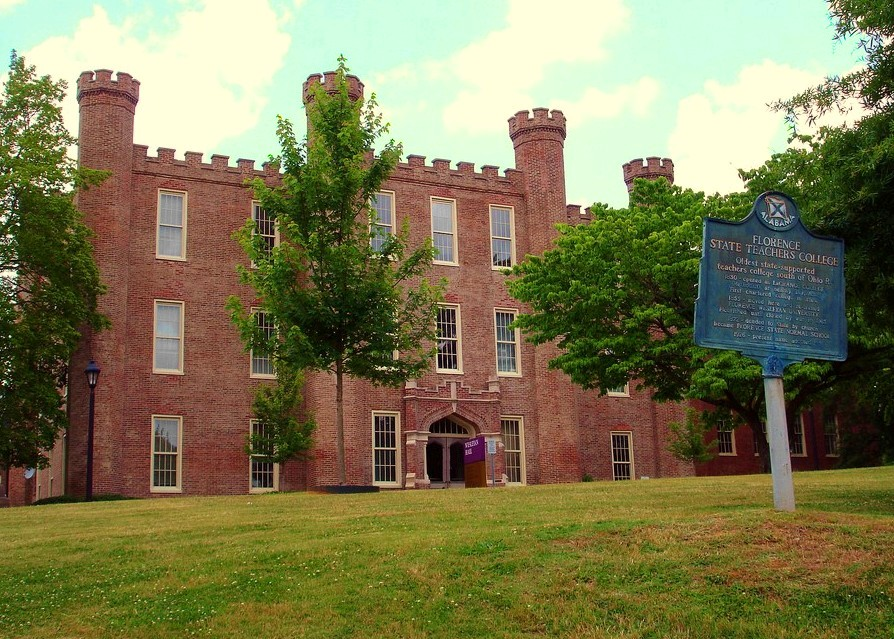
Wesleyan Hall in Florence, Alabama

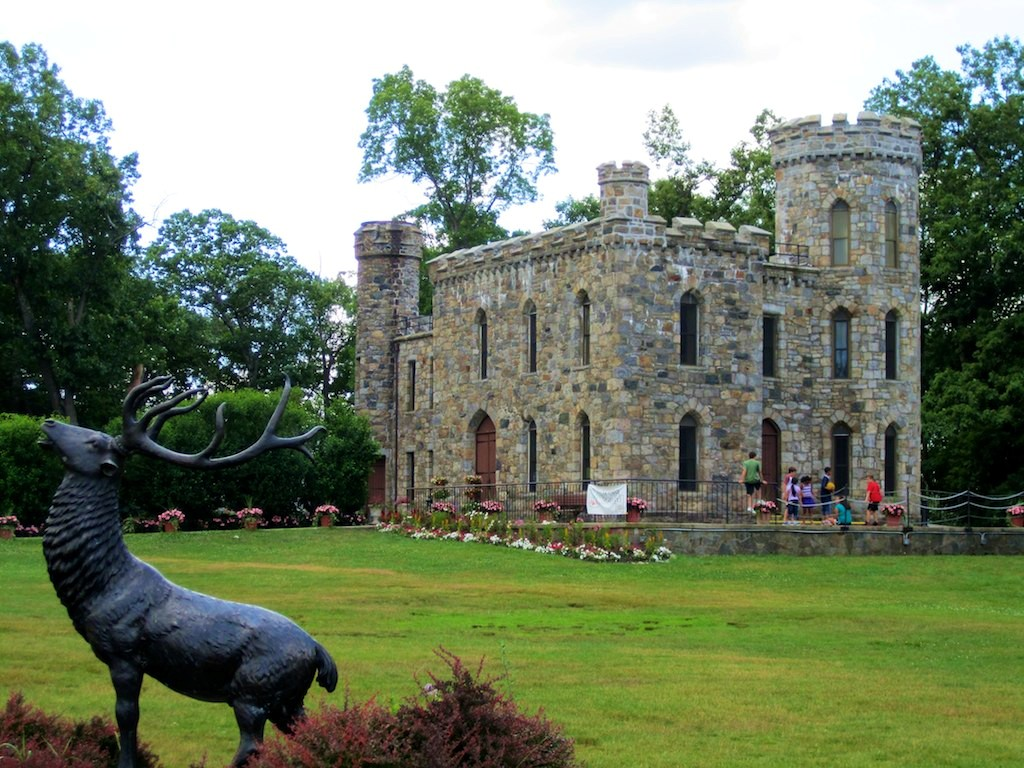
Winnekenni Castle in Haverhill, Massachusetts

=== A to C ===
- Alexander Brown House in Syracuse, NY, built 1895, is still in use and has been listed on the National Register of Historic Places.
- American Museum of Natural History in New York City, façade on West 77th Street, built 1874–c. 1920s
- Armory of the First Corps of Cadets, or Park Plaza Castle, Boston, Massachusetts, built 1897
- Atalaya Castle, former home near Murrells Inlet, South Carolina, listed on the National Register of Historic Places
- Bacon's Castle, Surry County, Virginia. Built in 1665, Bacon's Castle, originally known as the Arthur Allen Brick House, is British North America's oldest brick structure, North America's only surviving example of Jacobean architecture, and has North America's oldest, preserved 17th-century English formal garden.
- Bancroft Tower, Worcester, Massachusetts, a small-scale feudal castle built in 1900 in memory of George Bancroft. It is listed on the National Register of Historic Places.
- Bannerman's Castle, also known as Bannerman's Island Arsenal, Hudson River, Cornwall-on-Hudson, New York, built 1901–18. The structure was built as a military surplus warehouse in the style of a Romanesque castle by businessman Francis Bannerman. An explosion in 1920 destroyed a portion of the complex. The empty and partially collapsed shell remains as a picturesque ruin. It is listed on the National Register of Historic Places.
- Beacon Towers, Sands Point, New York, on the North Shore of Long Island, built 1917–18 for Alva Vanderbilt Belmont. It featured a combination of the Châteauesque and a unique Gothic style. It was demolished in 1945.
- Beardslee Castle, Little Falls, New York, built in 1860. It is an eclectic Gothic Revival style house with a rusticated stone facade.
- Belcourt Castle, Newport, Rhode Island, a Châteauesque mansion built 1891–94 for Oliver Belmont.
- Belvedere Castle, Vista Rock, Central Park, New York City, built as a folly in 1869. It was designed by Calvert Vaux and Frederick Law Olmsted, after they were reappointed to oversee the park's construction in 1865. The stone structure is a hybrid of the Gothic and Romanesque styles.
- Berkeley Castle, Bath, West Virginia, built for Colonel Samuel Taylor Suit in 1885. It is listed on the National Register of Historic Places.
- Bettendorf Castle, also known as Vianden Castle, Fox River Grove, Illinois, built in 1931–32.
- Biltmore Estate, Asheville, North Carolina, 175,000-square-foot (16,300 m^{2}) Châteauesque style mansion built 1889–95 for George Washington Vanderbilt II. It is the largest privately held home in the United States. It is a National Historic Landmark.
- Bishop Castle, Wet Mountains, Rye, Colorado, vicinity. Construction began on this eccentric structure in 1969 and was still in progress in 2010. Built by one man, Jim Bishop, the building facade is rubble stone, with a 160-foot (49 m) tower and a variety of self-made iron ornaments and bridges.
- Boldt Castle, Heart Island, Thousand Islands, New York, main house built from 1900 to 1904. Grounds also include additional castle-like follies.
- Boston University Castle or BU Castle, Boston, Massachusetts, built from 1904 to 1915. It is a Tudor Revival style mansion owned by Boston University.
- Bowman's Castle, Fayette County, Pennsylvania, built in 1789, the oldest Gothic Revival castle in the United States. It is listed on the National Register of Historic Places.
- Bull Run Castle, Aldie, Virginia, hand-built from 1980 to 1999 by the owner, John Roswell Miller, and his family. It is two stories with four round corner towers, a large central round tower at the rear, and a crenellated roof-line.
- Camelback Castle/Copenhaver Castle. The construction of the castle began in 1967 and was finished in 1977. The castle is located at 5050 E. Red Rock Dr. in Phoenix, Arizona. The architectural style of the castle is that of medieval Moorish. The castle has a dungeon, a drawbridge and a moat as well.
- Campbell Castle, Wichita, Kansas, built in 1888 for Burton Harvey Campbell in the Baronial style.
- Canterbury Castle, also known as Arlington Castle, Portland, Oregon, built 1929–1931. Designed by Jeter O. Frye. The 6,000-square-foot (560 m^{2}), three-story house featured a moat, drawbridge, and towers. It was demolished in 2009. It was formerly listed on the National Register of Historic Places.
- Carey Mansion, originally known as Seaview Terrace, Newport, Rhode Island, built 1923–28 in the Châteauesque style. Used for the exterior shots in the Dark Shadows gothic soap opera.
- Carrollcliffe, now Castle Hotel and Spa, Tarrytown, New York, built in two phases from 1897–1910 for General Howard Carroll.
- Castello di Amorosa, Calistoga, California, built 1995–2007. It is a working winery.
- Castle at Casa Basso, Westhampton, New York, built in 1906 by artist Theophilus Brower. The small castle with Moorish arches has been adjoined by a restaurant, Casa Basso, since 1928.
- Castle at Castle Park, near Holland, Michigan, built in 1890 for Michael Schwarz. It now serves as a community center for the Castle Park Association.
- Castle Craig, Hubbard Park, Meriden, Connecticut, 32-foot-high (9.8 m) tower built in 1900.
- Castle Falls, Oklahoma City, Oklahoma, built 1945.
- Castle Farms, Charlevoix, Michigan, built in 1918 by Albert Loeb, then vice president of Sears & Roebuck in a Normandy style. It was built as a showplace farm for cattle. Later it was an art park and a well known concert venue Castle Farms Music Theatre. Currently it is a tourist attraction and wedding venue.
- Castle Gatehouse, a pumping station for the Washington Aqueduct in Washington, D.C., built 1899–1901. It is listed as a contributing building on the National Register of Historic Places.
- Castle Gwynn, Triune, Tennessee, built 1980–present for Mike Freeman. The current plan calls for four towers with a keep, but so far only the first two towers have been completed. Freeman partially modeled the castle on Castell Coch in Tongwynlais, Wales. Castle Gwynn was featured in Taylor Swift's music video for "Love Story".
- Castle Kashan, a stone-styled castle that was built in 1978 by Thomas Hodges in Malibu, California. It was renamed to Castle Kashan by new owner Lilly Lawrence in 1998. The castle was burned to the ground in the October 2007 California firestorm.
- Castle La Crosse (La Crosse, Wisconsin) designed for Lumber Baron N.B. Holway in 1892. This imposing limestone building incorporates Richardson Romanesque with Queen Anne elements.The main residence contains 40+ rooms over 5 floors, 17,000 square feet.
- Castle Museum, Saginaw, Michigan, designed by William Martin Aikenbuilt and built in 1897. It is listed on the National Register of Historic Places.
- Castle of Heron Bay, Lake Worth, Texas. Formerly known as Whiting Castle, and commonly known as the Lake Worth Castle. Originally a three-room farm house built circa 1860, the property was won in a poker game by Samuel E. Whiting, who expanded and embellished the structure in the style of a castle, during the 1920s.
- Castle Post, Lexington, Kentucky, built from 1969 to 2008.
- Castle Rock, Garrison, New York, built in 1881 for Illinois Central Railroad president William H. Osborn. It is listed as a historic district on the National Register of Historic Places.
- Castle San Miguel, Hanceville, Alabama, contains the gift shop for the Shrine of the Most Blessed Sacrament.
- Castle Warden, St. Augustine, Florida, built in 1887 by millionaire William Warden as a winter home. The castle now serves as a Ripley's Believe It or Not! museum.
- Champ d'Or Estate, Hickory Creek, Texas, built 2002, modeled after the Vaux-le-Vicomte chateau in Paris
- Charles Piggott House, Portland, Oregon
- Château Laroche, also known as Loveland Castle, Loveland, Ohio, built 1929.
- Chateau Rochamore, Stamford, Connecticut, built from 1903 to 1906. Designed by the owner-architect, Gustav E. Steinback, the stone and half-timbered house has Norman and other medieval architectural influences.
- Château Woda Nymphée, built by architect Rodney, Lord Härringtón, made of moonlight pale and gold sediment coloured limestone from the Texas Hill Country and imported blood-red brick from a thousand-year old Ordensburg castle of the Teutonic Knights, a religious order of crusaders from Northern Europe. Traditional quarried green and purple slate for the Gothic roof was imported from Vermont. Architectural drawings show a cavernous wine cellar or dungeon as a fall-out shelter. Among the craftsmen of timber and mason who helped with construction was B. Bransom II. The château is presently unfinished and landlocked. A monastery is said to be operated there as well as a secret society. The exterior has been used in music videos and fashion shoots.

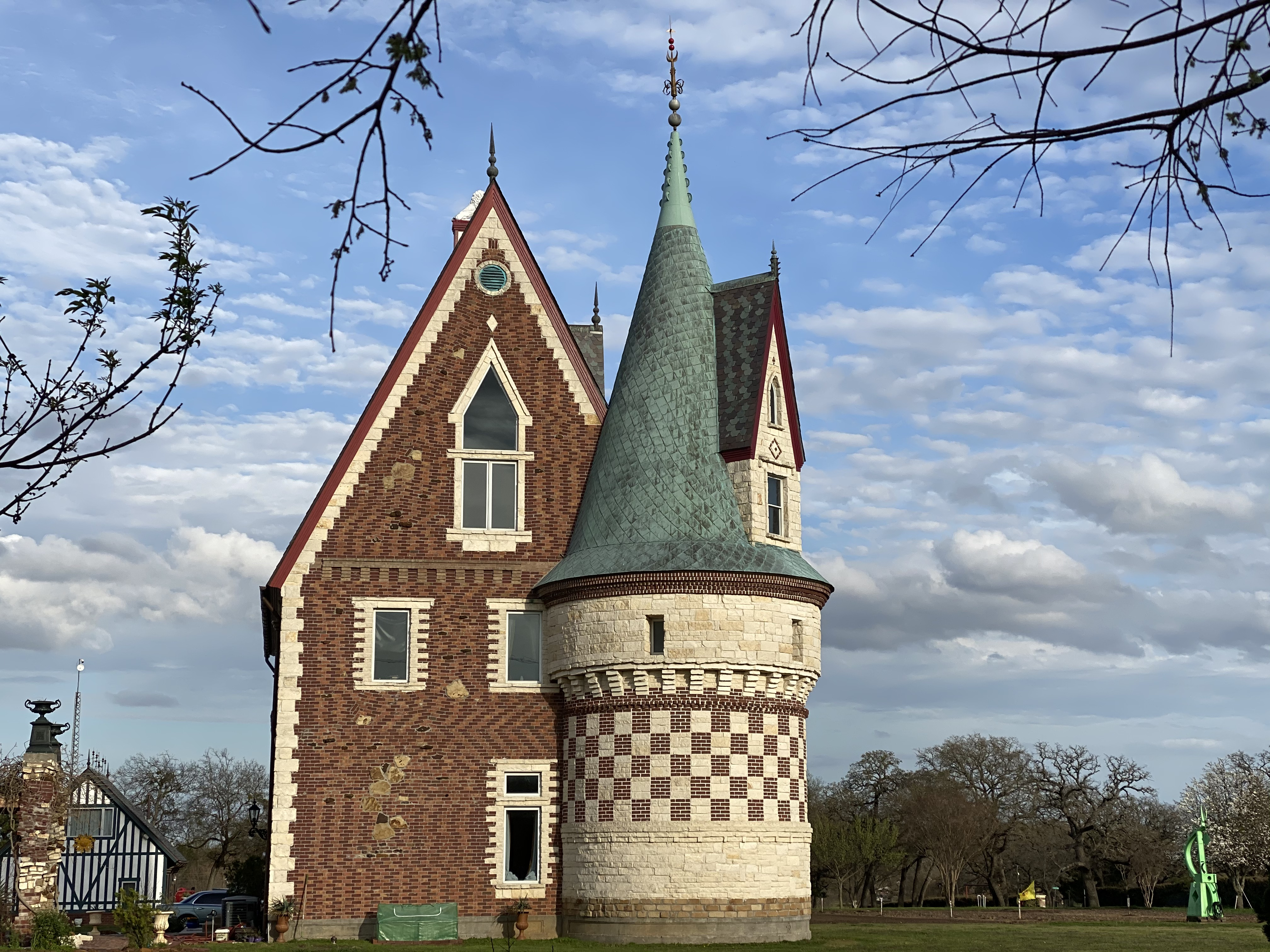
Le Chateau Woda Nymphée, near Fort Worth, Texas. Lord Härringtón

- Cherokee Castle, formerly Charlford Castle, Sedalia, Colorado, built from 1924 to 1926 by Charles Alfred Johnson.
- Cinderella Castle, Fantasyland, Magic Kingdom, Walt Disney World Resort, Orlando, Florida, based on the 1950 Walt Disney's animated film Cinderella, opened on October 1, 1971
- Cloisters Museum, Manhattan, New York City, built 1938 is a part of the Metropolitan Museum of Art and contains exhibitions on European medieval art.
- Coe Hall, Oyster Bay, New York, built for William Robertson Coe on his Planting Fields estate from 1915 to 1919. The three-story Tudor Revival mansion features a primary facade with a combination of carved stone, dressed stone, and some exposed half-timbering that gives it the look of having been built at different periods in history. It was designed by Walker & Gillette. The grounds were designed by Guy Lowell, with later work by the Olmsted Brothers firm. It is listed on the National Register of Historic Places.
- Coindre Hall, Huntington, New York, 80,000-square-foot (7,400 m^{2}) Châteauesque style mansion built for George McKesson Brown from 1910 to 1912. It is listed on the National Register of Historic Places.
- Collins Castle, Turner Falls, Arbuckle Mountains, Davis, Oklahoma, Built in the 1930s, the castle was featured in the movie The Veil starring William Moseley (2015).
- Copenhaver Castle, Camelback Mountain, Phoenix, Arizona, completed in 1977 by Mort Copenhaver.
- Coral Castle, Homestead, Florida, limestone megalithic structure built by Edward Leedskalnin from 1920 to 1948. It is listed as a historic district on the National Register of Historic Places.
- Cranston Street Armory, in Providence, Rhode Island
- Curwood Castle, Owosso, Michigan, Châteauesque style mansion built for James Oliver Curwood from 1922 to 1923. It is listed on the National Register of Historic Places.

=== D to K ===
Darrell Wolcott's Castle, Jefferson, Texas

- Druim Moir Castle, Philadelphia, Pennsylvania, built from 1885 to 1886 for Pennsylvania railroad tycoon Henry H. Houston. It is listed as a historic district on the National Register of Historic Places.
- Dunham Castle, Wayne, Illinois, Châteauesque style house built for Mark Wentworth Dunham in 1880. It is listed as a historic district on the National Register of Historic Places.
- Dunmere, Narragansett, Rhode Island, built in 1883 for Robert Graham Dun. The stone mansion features towers and cupolas. It is listed as a historic district on the National Register of Historic Places.
- El Cid Castle, which resembled a Moorish Castle, was built by the late Dr. Kenneth Hall, a physician who served the community of Sunnyslope in Phoenix, Arizona. Construction on the structure began in 1963 and was completed in 1980. It is located at the Northwest corner of 19th Ave and West Cholla Drive which technically is on the opposite side Sunnyslope's western boundary.
- Excalibur Hotel and Casino, Las Vegas, opened 1990. Casino is built to look like a castle.
- Fair Lane, Dearborn, Michigan, built from 1909 to 1913 for Ford Motor Company founder Henry Ford. Architects who worked on the design of the estate included Frank Lloyd Wright, Marion Mahony Griffin, and Joseph Nathaniel French. French was responsible for the final Baronial style of the main house. It is a National Historic Landmark.
- Fonthill, Doylestown, Pennsylvania, built 1908–12 for Henry Chapman Mercer. It is listed as a contributing building on the National Register of Historic Places.
- Franklin Castle, also known as the Hannes Tiedemann House, Cleveland, Ohio, built in 1881 for Hannes Tiedemann. It is listed on the National Register of Historic Places.
- Gillette Castle, Hadlyme, Connecticut, built in 1914 for William Gillette. It is listed on the National Register of Historic Places.
- Givins Beverly Castle, Chicago, Illinois, home of the Beverly Unitarian Church and built in 1887 by Robert C. Givins and inspired by a similar castle he saw on a trip to Ireland.
- Glamorgan, Alliance, Ohio, built from 1904 to 1905 for William Henry Morgan. The exterior features a facade of Vermont marble. It is listed on the National Register of Historic Places.
- Glencairn, Bryn Athyn, Pennsylvania, built in a unique Romanesque style from 1928 to 1939. It was designed by the owner, Raymond Pitcairn, for his family. It has more than 100 rooms and a seven-story tower. It is now a museum. It is listed as a contributing building on the National Register of Historic Places.
- Glen Eyrie, Colorado Springs, Colorado, Tudor Revival style house built in 1871 for William Jackson Palmer. It is listed on the National Register of Historic Places.
- Glen Island Park, New Rochelle, New York, German castle based on structures in the Rhineland, built late 19th century as part of Starin's Glen Island amusement park as a beer garden and restaurant.
- Greenback Castle, Greenback Tennessee, built in a unique style in a man's front yard. Floyd Banks felt motivated by God to construct this castle into a place that celebrates his faith. Construction started in 1994, and Banks is still adding on.
- Grey Court, also known as Tenney Castle, Methuen, Massachusetts, built from 1890 to 1892 for Charles H. Tenney. The Châteauesque style mansion was designed by Carrère and Hastings, with influences primarily derived from the Château d'Yquem. It was destroyed by arson in 1978.
- Grey Towers Castle, Arcadia University, Glenside, Pennsylvania, built 1881–83 for William Welsh Harrison. It was designed by Horace Trumbauer.
- Ha Ha Tonka Castle, Ha Ha Tonka State Park, Missouri, built from 1905 to early 1920s for Robert McClure Snyder Sr.. Originally used as a vacation home and later a hotel, it burned down in 1942. The ruins and grounds are now a state park.
- Hammond Castle, Gloucester, Massachusetts, built from 1926 to 1929 for John Hays Hammond Jr. It is a National Historic Landmark.
- Harbor Hill, Roslyn, New York, on the North Shore of Long Island overlooking Hempstead Harbor, built 1899–1902 for Clarence Mackay. The house alone cost $781,483. It was designed by McKim, Mead & White in the Châteauesque style, with heavy influences from the Château de Maisons. The grounds were designed by Guy Lowell. The main house was demolished in 1947.
- Hartlands, Old Saybrook, Connecticut, completed in 1908 for George Watson Beach. Designed by Alfredo S. G. Taylor, it combines Tudor Revival and Gothic Revival with some other early 20th century influences. The 15,000-square-foot (1,400 m^{2}) stone mansion features a three-story crenellated tower. It is listed on the National Register of Historic Places.
- Hazard Castle, adjacent to Rhode Island Sound, Narragansett, Rhode Island, built in 1882 for Joseph Peace Hazard. The stone Gothic Revival mansion includes a 105-foot-tall (32 m) crenellated tower. It is listed as a contributing building on the National Register of Historic Places.
- Hearst Castle, San Simeon, California, built from 1919 to 1947 for William Randolph Hearst. The main house was designed by Julia Morgan in a unique mixture of Mediterranean Revival, Renaissance and Baroque styles. It is a National Historic Landmark.
- Hearthstone Castle, Danbury, Connecticut, built in a Norman style from 1895 to 1899 for E. Starr Sanford. It is listed on the National Register of Historic Places.
- Hempstead House, Sands Point, New York, on the North Shore of Long Island, built from 1909 to 1912 for Howard Gould. It contains two stone Tudor Revival style structures with towers. Hempstead House is the main house. Castle Gould contained the stables and the servants quarters. It is listed as a historic district on the National Register of Historic Places.
- Henderson Castle, Kalamazoo, Michigan, built in the Queen Anne style with an exterior facade of Lake Superior sandstone and brick in 1895.
- Henderson Castle, Washington, D.C., built in 1889 for former Senator John B. Henderson and his wife Mary Foote Henderson. Designed by architect Eugene C. Gardner and demolished in 1949.
- Herreshoff Castle, Marblehead, Massachusetts, completed in 1927.
- Hippol Castle, also known as Gimghoul Castle, Chapel Hill, North Carolina, built 1924 as the meeting place for a collegiate secret society called the Order of Gimghoul.
- Hogwarts Castle, Islands of Adventure, Universal Orlando Resort, Orlando, Florida, premiered 2010 as a theme park attraction.
- Iviswold Castle, Rutherford, New Jersey, completed in 1887. Its current form was designed by William Henry Miller in a Late Victorian style. Iviswold is now part of Felician University's Rutherford campus, and is listed on the National Register of Historic Places.
- Joslyn Castle, also known as Lynhurst, Omaha, Nebraska, built in the Baronial style in 1903. It was built from Kansas limestone and cost approximately $250,000 to build. It is listed on the National Register of Historic Places.
- Kimberly Crest, Redlands, California, completed in 1896 for Cornelia A. Hill. It was designed by Oliver Perry Dennis and Lyman Farwell, a Los Angeles-based partnership, in the Châteauesque style. It is listed on the National Register of Historic Places.
- Kip's Castle, Verona, New Jersey, originally known as "Kypsburg", constructed over a three-year period in the early 1900s by Frederic Ellsworth Kip and his wife, Charlotte Bishop Williams Kip. Frederic was a wealthy textile inventor and industrialist.

=== L to R ===
- Lambert Castle, Garret Mountain Reservation, Paterson, New Jersey, built from 1892 to 1893 for Catholina Lambert. Lambert continued to expand the estate, building a 70-foot (21 m) observation tower, a summerhouse, and an art gallery in 1896. It is listed on the National Register of Historic Places.
- Layton Castle, Monroe, LA. Originally called Mulberry Grove Plantation. The initial raised Louisiana cottage, built in 1814 by Judge Henry Bry, was later subsumed into what is now called Layton Castle, in 1910, by his grand daughter-in-law, Eugenia Stubbs Layton Wright. It was listed on the National Register of Historic Places in 1978. Layton Castle is built of red brick, most of it created on the property, and features a crenellated turret, and an immense porte-cochère. In the 1930s, parts of the house were divided into apartments and remain so today. Descendants of the original family live on the large second floor.
- Lookout Mountain Castle, Chattanooga, Tennessee, built in 1929 over Ruby Falls on Lookout Mountain. It is listed as a historic district on the National Register of Historic Places.
- Lord's Castle, Waltham, Massachusetts, completed in 1886 for Rufus E. Lord. The two-story Baronial style house features a three-story crenellated tower. It is listed on the National Register of Historic Places.
- Loudoun House, Lexington, Kentucky, built in 1850 for Francis Key Hunt and designed by Alexander Jackson Davis.
- Lucerne Hotel, Lucerne, California, built 1926.
- Lyndhurst, Tarrytown, New York, a Gothic Revival country house built 1838–65. It was designed by Alexander Jackson Davis in two phases, in 1838 for the first owner, William Paulding Jr., and the second time in 1864–65 for George Merritt. It is a National Historic Landmark.
- Magic Castle, Hollywood, California, Victorian style house designed by Oliver Perry Dennis and Lyman Farwell, a near duplicate of Kimberly Crest House and Gardens. Currently a performance venue, restaurant, and clubhouse for the Academy of Magical Arts.
- Manresa Castle, Port Townsend, Washington, Châteauesque style house completed in 1892 for Charles and Kate Eisenbeis, now a hotel.
- Maryvale Castle, Brooklandville, Maryland, Built in 1912 by Baltimore architect Wilson L. Smith in the style of Warwick Castle in England as a private residence, it became a Catholic boarding school in 1945. It is now part of Maryvale Preparatory School.
- Marion Castle, Shippan Point, Stamford, Connecticut, built from 1914 to 1916 for Frank J. Marion. The Châteauesque style mansion was designed by the firm of Hunt & Hunt, sons of Richard Morris Hunt. It is listed on the National Register of Historic Places.
- Meadow Brook Hall, Rochester Hills, Michigan, Tudor Revival style house built 1926–29 for Matilda Dodge Wilson. The former estate is now home to Oakland University. It is listed on the National Register of Historic Places.
- Melrose, Casanova, Virginia, crenellated Gothic Revival mansion with three-story tower. Built from 1856 to 1858 for the Murray family. It served as a Union Army headquarters during the American Civil War. It is listed on the National Register of Historic Places.
- Mercer Museum, Doylestown, Pennsylvania, poured concrete structure combining an eclectic mix of styles. It was built from 1913 to 1916 for Henry Chapman Mercer as a museum to house his collections. It is listed as a contributing building on the National Register of Historic Places.
- Montezuma Castle, Montezuma, New Mexico, 400-room Queen Anne style hotel built in 1886 (after burning down twice, in 1881 and 1885) that capitalized on the natural hot springs nearby. It has since been renovated by the United World College and houses multiple college facilities including the school dining hall, guest and dorm rooms, offices, classrooms, rehearsal spaces, and a student center complete with a store, laundry rooms, pool and tables, and a kitchen.
- Mystery Castle, Phoenix, Arizona, built from 1930 to 1935 by the owner, Boyce Luther Gulley. The eighteen room, three-story castle was built using found materials, adobe, and stone.
- Nichols Hall, Kansas State University, Manhattan, Kansas, built in 1911 as a gymnasium for the university.
- Norumbega, Camden, Maine, completed in 1886 for Joseph Barker Stearns. The architecture of the mansion combines Châteauesque, Flemish, and Queen Anne motifs. It is listed on the National Register of Historic Places. It is listed on the National Register of Historic Places.
- Ochre Court, Newport, Rhode Island, Châteauesque style mansion built at a cost of $4.5 million in 1892. Designed by Richard Morris Hunt for Ogden Goelet. It is listed as a contributing building on the National Register of Historic Places.
- Oheka Castle, Huntington, New York, on Long Island, 109,000-square-foot (10,100 m^{2}) Châteauesque style mansion built for Otto Hermann Kahn from 1914 to 1919. It is the second largest privately held home in the United States. It is listed on the National Register of Historic Places.
- Olana, Greenport, New York. Designed by Calvert Vaux, it was built in an eclectic mix of Victorian, Persian and Moorish styles. It was built from 1870 to 1872 for Frederic Edwin Church.
- Old Georgia State Capitol, Milledgeville, Georgia, state capitol building built from 1807 to 1837. It was the first public building built in the Gothic Revival style in the United States. Now a part of Georgia Military College, the Old Capital Museum is housed on the ground floor. It is listed on the National Register of Historic Places.
- Old Louisiana State Capitol, Baton Rouge, Louisiana, state capitol building built in the Gothic Revival style from 1847 to 1852. Used as a prison by the Union Army following the capture of the city during the Civil War. While being used as a prison it caught fire and the interior was gutted. The interior was rebuilt in 1882 and it continued to be used as the capitol building until 1932. It is a National Historic Landmark.
- Old Main, Eastern Illinois University campus, Charleston, Illinois, completed in 1899. Built with Indiana limestone in the Gothic Revival style, with turrets, towers, and battlements.
- Osgood Castle, Redstone, Colorado, built 1902–03 for John C. Osgood, then-president of the Colorado Fuel and Iron Company and one of the richest men in the country at the time. It is a 42-room wooden Tudor Revival structure listed on the National Register.
- Overlook Castle, Asheville, North Carolina, built from 1912 to 1914 for Fred Loring Seely. It is a stone Tudor Revival mansion with towers and a crenellated roof. It is listed on the National Register of Historic Places.
- Piatt Castles, West Liberty, Ohio, two stone mansions built by brothers Abram Sanders Piatt and Donn Piatt. Both mansions combine Flemish and Gothic styles. Both were started in 1864, with Mac-A-Cheek, built for Abram, completed in 1871 and Mac-O-Chee, built for Donn, completed in 1879. Both are listed on the National Register of Historic Places.
- Piermont Castle, also known as The Cedars or Lord's Castle, Piermont, New York, built in 1892 for Eleazar Lord. The 15,000-square-foot (1,400 m^{2}) Châteauesque mansion has thirty primary rooms and was designed by McKim, Mead & White. The interior features 18th-century Italian paneling.
- Pyne Castle, originally known as Broadview Villa, Laguna Beach, California, 62-room Châteauesque mansion built from 1927 to 1935 for E. Walter Pyne. The approximately 15,000-square-foot (1,400 m^{2}) masonry structure was converted into apartments during the early 1960s.
- Quinlan Castle, Birmingham, Alabama, built in 1926 as the Royal Arms Apartments. The four-story building is arranged around an open-air courtyard, with a turreted tower on each corner. The facade features arched windows and doors and is faced is rough stone. It is listed on the National Register of Historic Places.
- Reid Castle, originally known as Ophir Hall, Purchase, New York, completed in 1892. This granite castle-style mansion was designed by Stanford White for Whitelaw Reid. It is six stories and contains 84 rooms. The grounds were landscaped by Frederick Law Olmsted. It now part of the Manhattanville University campus. It is listed on the National Register of Historic Places.
- Reynolds Castle, in LeFlore County, Oklahoma, an Old World-style castle built as residence of Confederate Captain James E. Reynolds.
- Rhodes Hall, Atlanta, Georgia, built 1902–04 for Amos G. Rhodes, owner of Rhodes Furniture. It was designed by Willis F. Denny in a combination of the Baronial, Châteauesque, and Romanesque styles. Now surrounded by commercial buildings, it is one of the last surviving Peachtree Street mansions. It is listed on the National Register of Historic Places.
- Richthofen Castle, Denver, Colorado. built from 1883 to 1887 for Walter von Richthofen. His nephew was Manfred von Richthofen, the "Red Baron". The house was supposedly modeled on a castle owned by the Richthofen family in Europe. It was remodeled in 1910 and expanded in 1924.
- Rocky Hill Castle, Courtland, Alabama, built 1858–61 with crenellated connecting walls and five-story Gothic Revival folly tower. It was demolished in 1961.
- Rubel Castle, also known as Rubel Pharm, Glendora, California, built 1968–88. Castle-like home of Michael Clarke Rubel, who used concrete, stone, and a mixture of recycled materials to construct it.
- Rufus Rand Mansion, also known as the Lake Office, Minnetonka, Minnesota, built 1931. Originally built in a French château style as a country home. The Chateau has a marble staircase, 400,000 ft^{2} (37,000 m^{2}), 63 rooms, 14 fireplaces, and 17 bathrooms, and was known as "Still Pond" until it was purchased by Cargill in 1946. It served as the company's global headquarters until 2017.

=== S to Z ===
- San Francisco Armory, locally known simply as The Armory, Mission District, San Francisco, built from 1912 to 1914. It is a brick Moorish Revival building with loophole windows and corner towers. It is listed on the National Register of Historic Places.
- Scotty's Castle, Grapevine Mountains, Death Valley, California, built from 1922 to 1931. It is a two-story Mission Revival and Spanish Colonial Revival style villa with two tall towers projecting from the main structure. It is listed as a historic district on the National Register of Historic Places.
- Searles Castle, Great Barrington, Massachusetts, completed 1883. Designed by McKim, Mead & White for Mary Hopkins, widow of Mark Hopkins Jr. She commissioned Edward Francis Searles to design the interior and eventually married him. It is a stone Châteauesque style mansion with 40 rooms and seven turrets. It is listed on the National Register of Historic Places.
- Searles Castle, Windham, New Hampshire, built 1905–15 for Edward Francis Searles (see entry above). The stone Tudor Revival mansion was designed by Henry Vaughan, with influences derived from the manor at Stanton Harcourt in Oxfordshire, England. It is listed on the National Register of Historic Places.
- Shea's Castle, also known as Rock Castle, Antelope Valley, California, built in 1924. It is a stone castle-like house with a crenellated roof-line.
- Singer Castle, formerly Jorstadt Castle, Thousand Islands, New York, built in 1896. Designed by Ernest Flagg for Frederick Gilbert Bourne of the Singer Manufacturing Company.
- Sky High Castle, Redings Mill, Missouri, built 1927–30. Situated upon a 180-foot-tall (55 m) hill, the two-story mansion has a four-story tower on one corner. It has a stone facade and a crenellated roofline.
- Sleeping Beauty Castle, Fantasyland, Disneyland, Anaheim, California, based on the Walt Disney's 1959 animated film Sleeping Beauty opened on July 17, 1955.
- Smithmore Castle, also known as Smithmore, Spruce Pine, North Carolina. It is a private mountain estate purchased and renovated by Rob Smith in 2008, and serves as a working hotel with a restaurant.
- Smithsonian Castle, on the National Mall of Washington D.C., built 1847–55 to house the Smithsonian Institution. The Gothic Revival style structure was designed by James Renwick Jr. and Robert Mills. Although intended to be built using white marble, in the end red Seneca sandstone was used. It is a National Historic Landmark.
- Squire's Castle, Cleveland, Ohio. It was built during the 1890s for Feargus B. Squire, one of the founders of Standard Oil, as a gatekeeper's house and caretaker's quarters for his planned country estate. His wife died and the estate was never built; even the gatekeeper's house was left as an incomplete shell.
- Stan Hywet, Akron, Ohio, built 1912–15 for Frank Seiberling, founder of Goodyear Tire and Rubber Company. The 64,500-square-foot (5,990 m^{2}) Tudor Revival mansion was designed by Charles Sumner Schneider. It features a brick and exposed half-timbered facade with a large central crenellated tower. The grounds were designed by Warren H. Manning. It is the tenth largest house in the United States. It is a National Historic Landmark.
- Stokesay Castle, Reading, Pennsylvania, built in 1931 and modeled after the 13th century castle in Shropshire, England, by the same name. Serves as an event venue, fine dining restaurant, and casual pub.
- Stewart's Castle, Washington, D.C., completed in 1873 for Senator William Morris Stewart. Second Empire house that was demolished in 1901.
- Stronghold, Oregon, Illinois, built 1928–30 for Chicago newspaper publisher Walter Strong in the Tudor Revival style.
- Thornewood, Lakewood, Washington, built from 1908 to 1911. The brick Tudor Revival mansion was designed by Kirtland Cutter for Chester Thorne, who had the bricks from a dismantled 15th century Elizabethan manor house in England shipped to the site for the construction. The substructure is concrete and steel. The mansion was used as a set for the Stephen King miniseries Rose Red. It is listed on the National Register of Historic Places.
- The Tovrea Castle was built between December 1929 and January 1931 and is located at 5041 E. Van Buren St. The castle was listed on the National Register of Historic Places on Oct. 1, 1996.
- Uhuburg, Eagle Owl Castle near the Alpine Bavarian City of Helen, GA. Founded in 2008 and opened in May 2023 as a Citadel of Epistemology for ones of its educational missions to understand how humankind has tried to understand life through the ages via murals depicting philosophies and religions. It is also a self-sustaining food advocate with working gardens, a nature and botanical place on 45 acres of southern Appalachian terrain and fauna, and a celebration place for weddings, lectures, dances, and the like.
- Usen Castle, Waltham, Massachusetts, built in 1928 to serve as the main hall for Middlesex University. It was designed in the Baronial style by John H. Smith. Middlesex University closed in 1946 and was rechartered as Brandeis University in 1948. It is listed on the National Register of Historic Places.
- Vikingsholm, Lake Tahoe, California, built from 1928 to 1929 as a summer home for Lora Josephine Knight. Designed by Lennart Palme and Matt Green, the 38-room mansion features a stone facade with Scandinavian Gothic influences, with the stone facade influenced by churches and castles of southern Sweden and wooden elements inside and out influenced by early Norse woodcarvings. It is listed on the National Register of Historic Places.
- Villa Zorayda, also known as Zorayda Castle, St. Augustine, Florida, built in 1883 for Franklin W. Smith. The Moorish Revival style mansion was built as Smith's winter home. The poured concrete structure features Moorish arches, a crenellated roof-line, and a three-story tower. It is listed on the National Register of Historic Places.
- Wadsworth Atheneum, Hartford, Connecticut, built from 1842–44 as a museum on the site of the former home of Daniel Wadsworth. The Gothic Revival building was designed by Alexander Jackson Davis and Ithiel Town. The Atheneum is the oldest public art museum in the nation. It is listed on the National Register of Historic Places.
- Ward's Castle, Port Chester, New York, built in the 1870s. The house is an early example of the use of reinforced concrete. It is an unusual combination of the Second Empire and Gothic Revival styles. It features a four-story crenellated tower on one corner. It is listed on the National Register of Historic Places.
- Waveny House, New Canaan, Connecticut, completed in 1912 for Lewis Lapham. The Tudor Revival style mansion was designed by William Tubby, with the grounds designed by Frederick Law Olmsted Jr. The exterior was used in filming of the original Batman television series and in the 2004 remake of The Stepford Wives.
- Wesleyan Hall, University of North Alabama campus, Florence, Alabama, built from 1855 to 1856. The brick Gothic Revival style structure was built to serve Florence Wesleyan University, forerunner of the University of North Alabama. It is listed on the National Register of Historic Places.
- Westcott Building, Florida State University, Tallahassee, Florida, built in 1910, constructed in Collegiate Gothic architectural style.
- Wilson Castle, Proctor, Vermont, built from 1867 to 1875 for John Johnson. The three-story mansion combines the Flemish, Baronial, and Romanesque styles with a facade of brick and marble. It contains 32 primary rooms. Construction of the estate cost $1,300,000 by the time that it was completed.
- Wing's Castle, Millbrook, New York, built from 1970–present by the owners, Peter and Toni Wing. The stone, timber, and stucco structure was built using eighty percent recycled materials, much of it salvaged from demolished structures.
- Winnekenni Castle, Haverhill, Massachusetts, built from 1873 to 1875 for Dr. James R. Nichols. The dressed stone Baronial style house is two stories with two three-story towers, a small rooftop turret, and a crenellated roof-line.

== See also ==
- List of castles
- List of tourist attractions worldwide
