= Casa Basso =

Historic site in Westhampton, New York, US

Theophilus Brouwer House
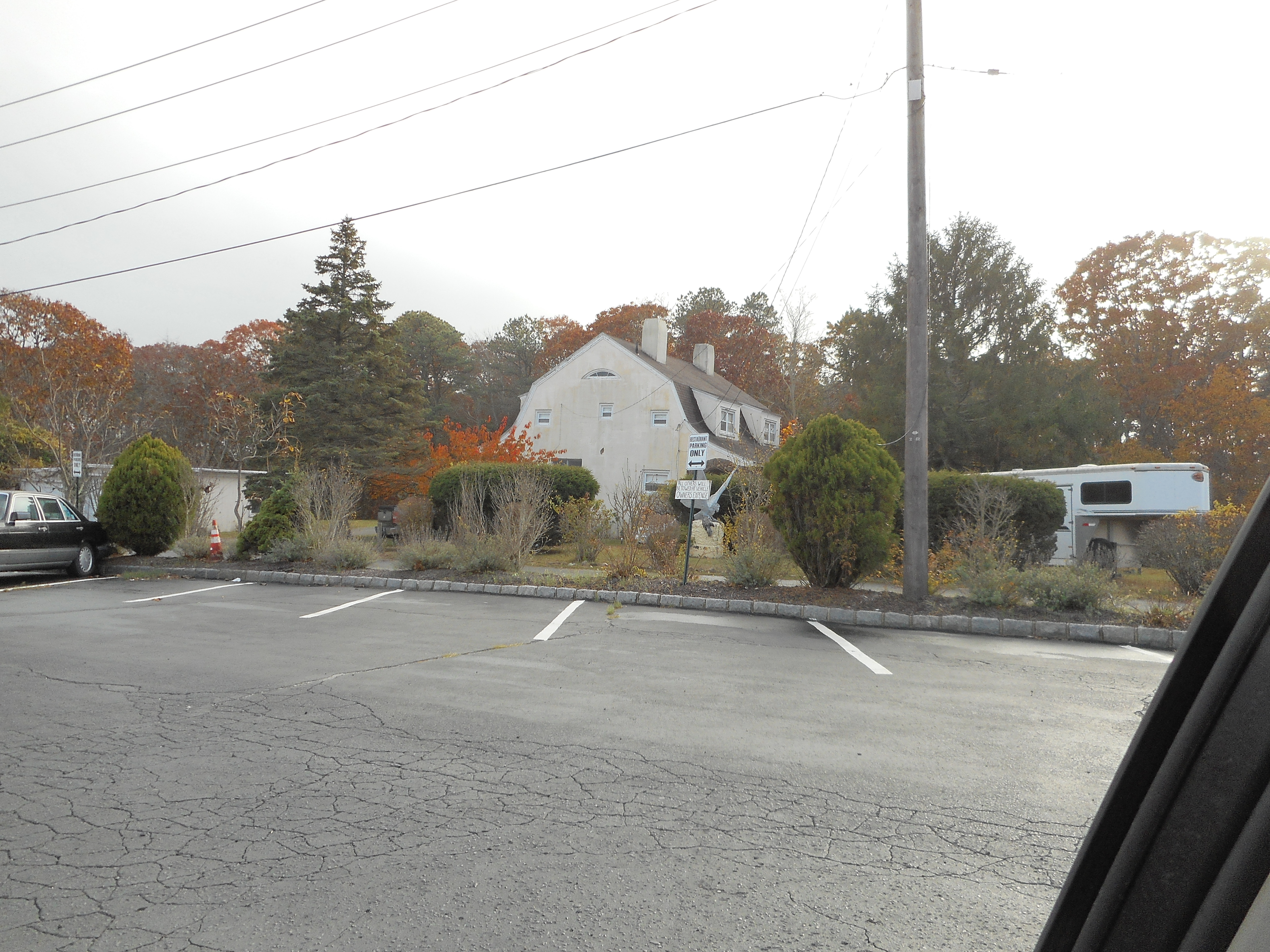
- The locally historic Theophilus Brouwer House.

- Location within New York
- 40°49′17″N 72°39′47″W
- Location: 59 Montauk Highway, Westhampton, NY

Site notes
- Architect: Theophilus Brower
- Governing body: Private

Casa Basso is an Italian restaurant located on the eastern end of Long Island in Westhampton, New York. It is the site of the Theophilus Brouwer House. The property including both Casa Basso and the house has been designated a Westhampton Hamlet Heritage Resource, as it includes ruins of the pottery studio and kiln of Theophilus Anthony Brouwer, Jr.

== History ==
=== Location ===
The property is bordered by Montauk Highway to the front and the Beaver Dam Creek to the back. It was originally purchased in the late 19th century by American artist Theophilus Anthony Brouwer, Jr. As a young man, Brouwer traveled and studied art in Spain and Italy, and when he returned to Long Island, he built a castle like one he remembered near Seville. After completing the castle, he adorned the property with romantic sculptures which include two twelve foot swordsmen, a Roman lion, and a Psyche. This man-made property would later become known as Pinewold Park and be open for public viewing.

=== Restaurant ===
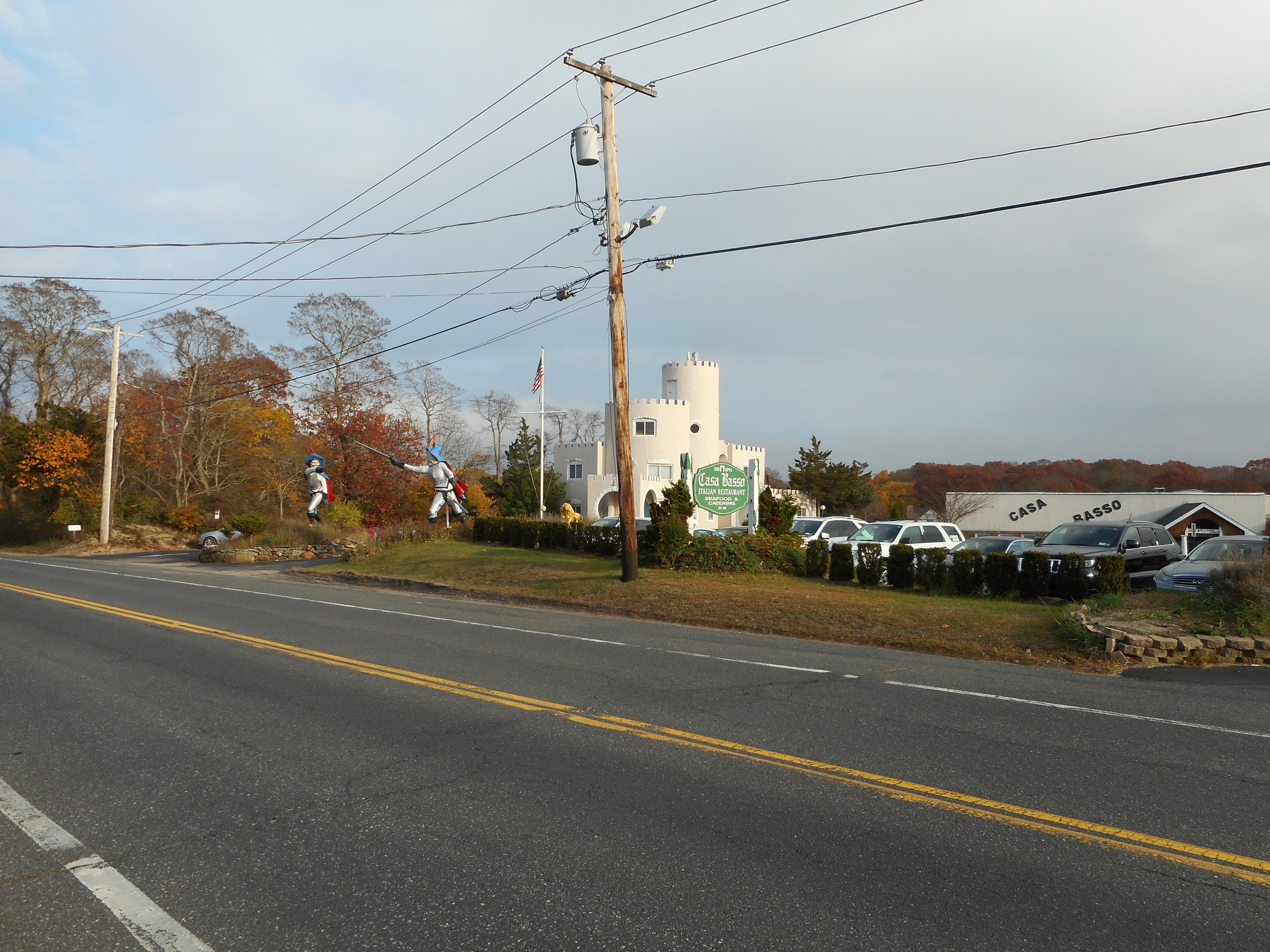
The Castle at Casa Basso as seen from Montauk Highway.

Casa Basso was opened as a restaurant for the first time in 1928 by New York restaurateur M.L. Basso and his family. The Basso family successfully operated the restaurant until 1958 when it was purchased by Valerio "Rene" Mondini. In 1986, Mondini sold the restaurant to his longtime apprentice, Bejto Bracovic, who became the new owner and executive chef.

== Closing ==
After serving the community for 96 years, on November 23, 2024 the restaurant closed its doors for the very last time.

The property has since been purchased to be made into a public park.
