= C. Willis Damon =

American architect

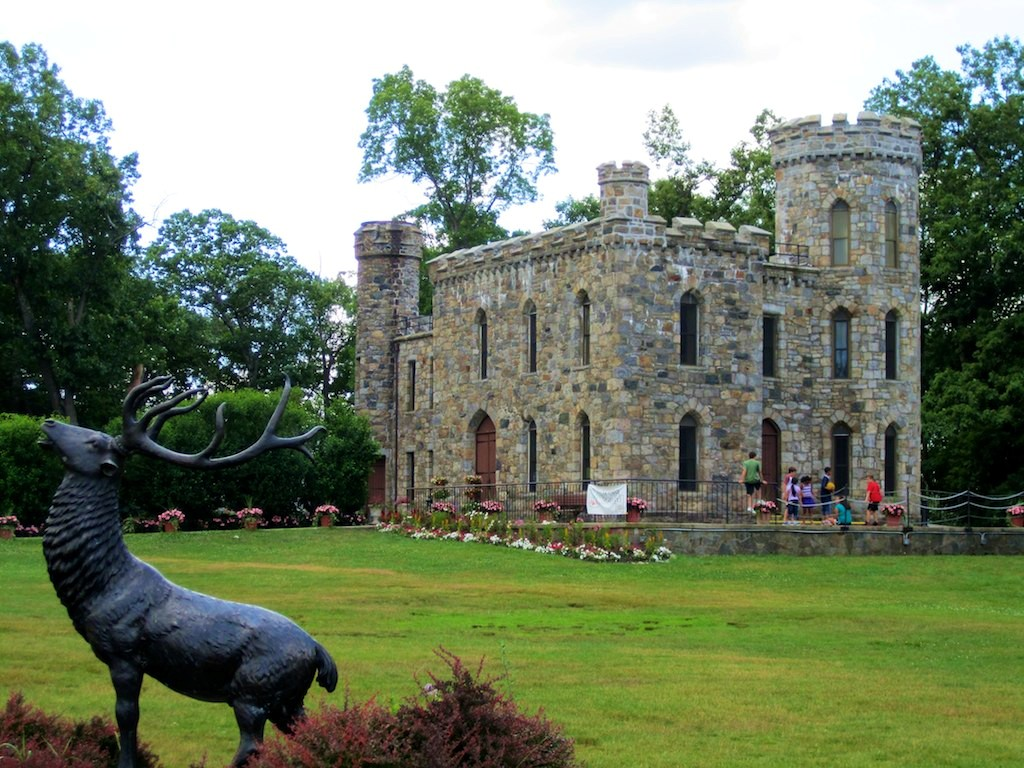
Winnekenni Hall, Haverhill, MA. 1873-75.

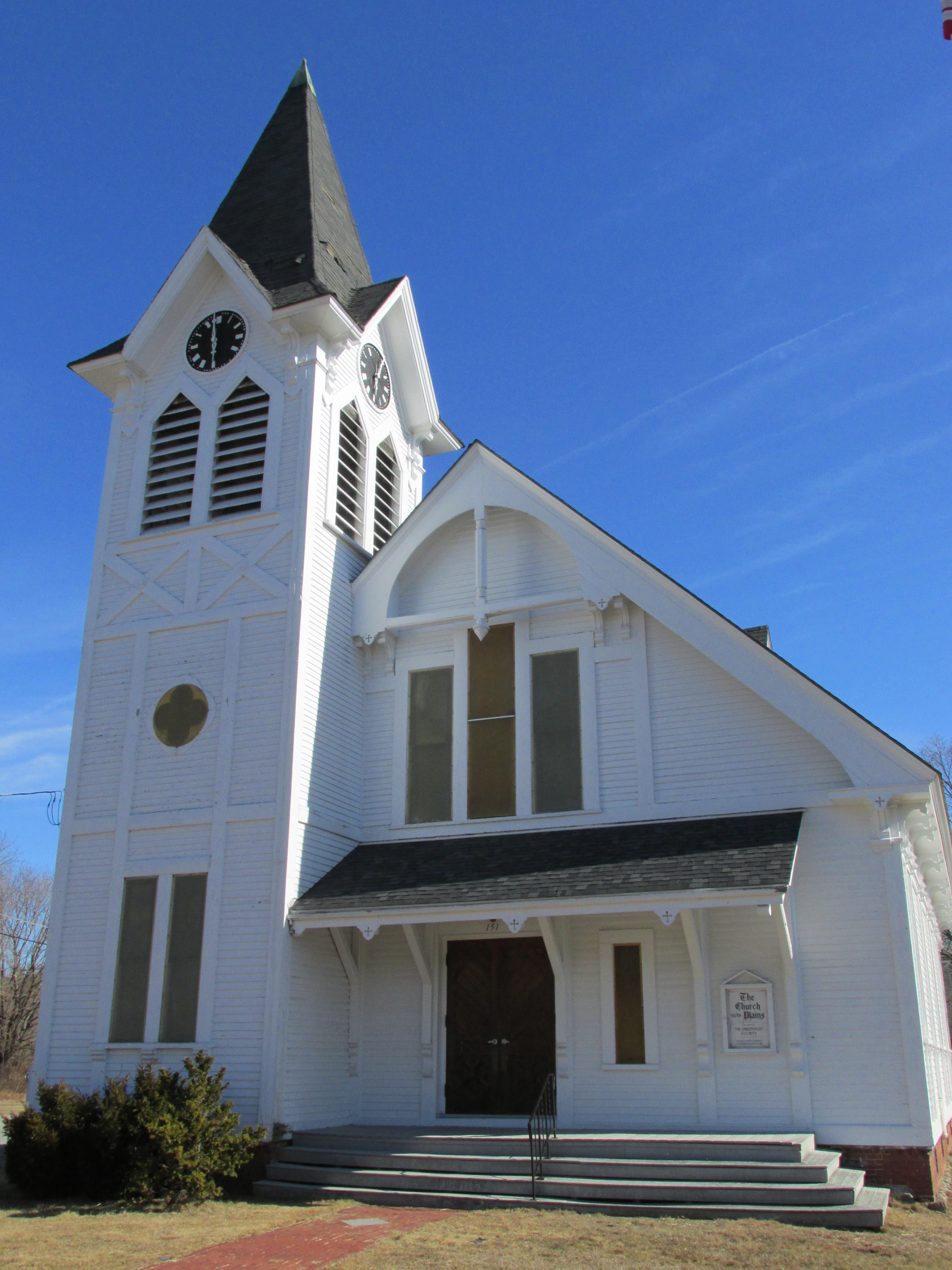
First Universalist Church, Kingston, NH. 1879.

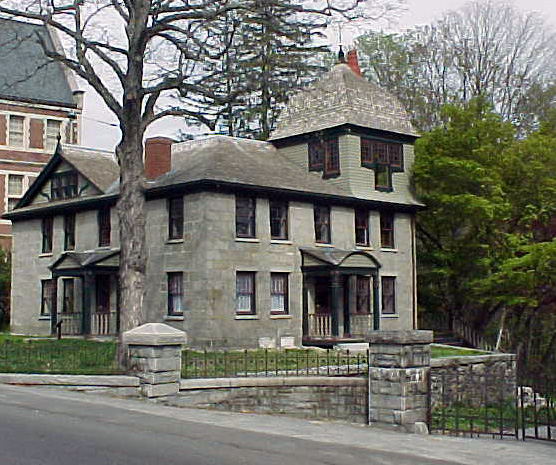
Gatehouse (Remodeling), Grey Court, Methuen, MA. 1883.

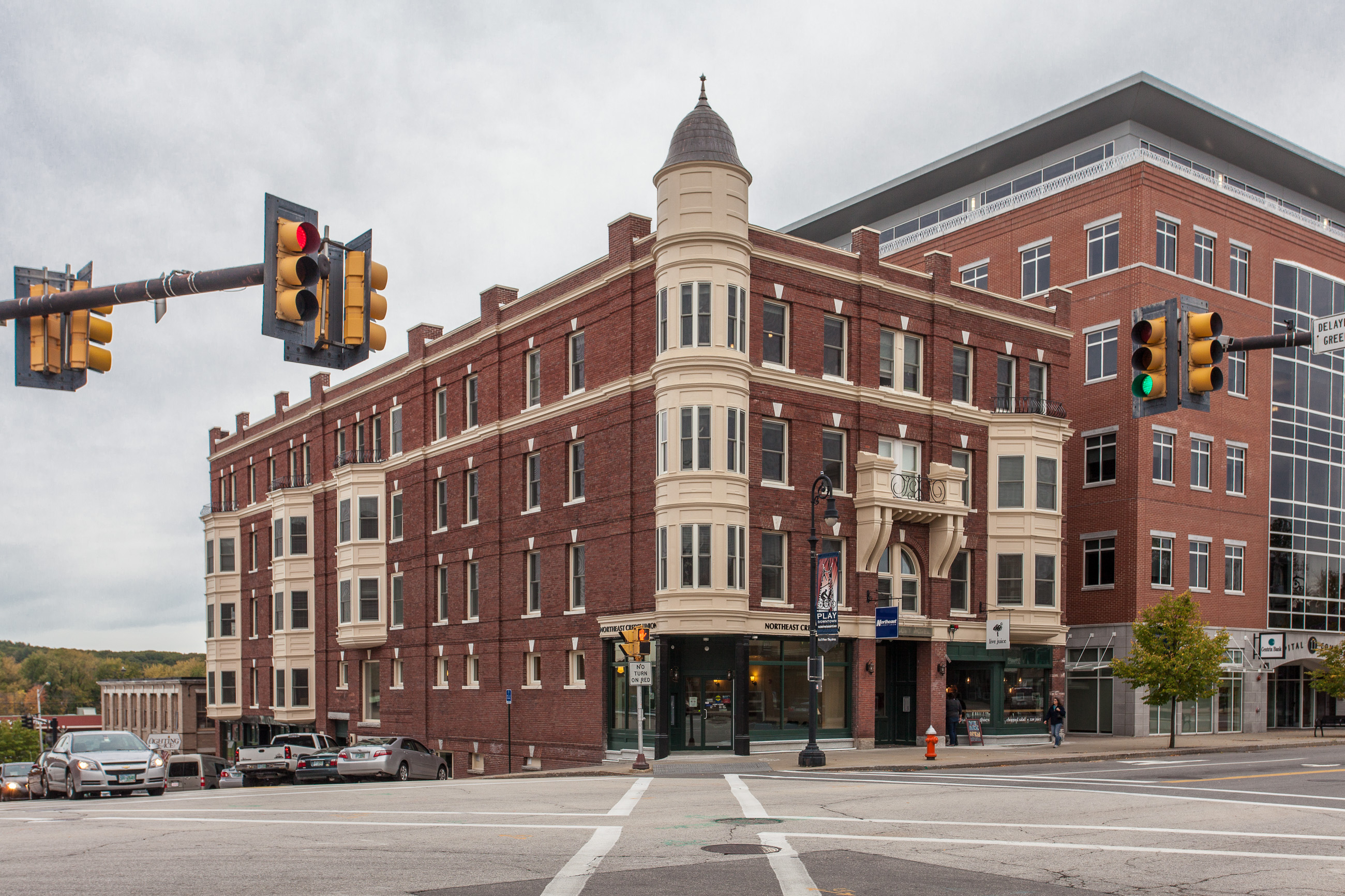
Blanchard's Block, Concord, NH. 1894.

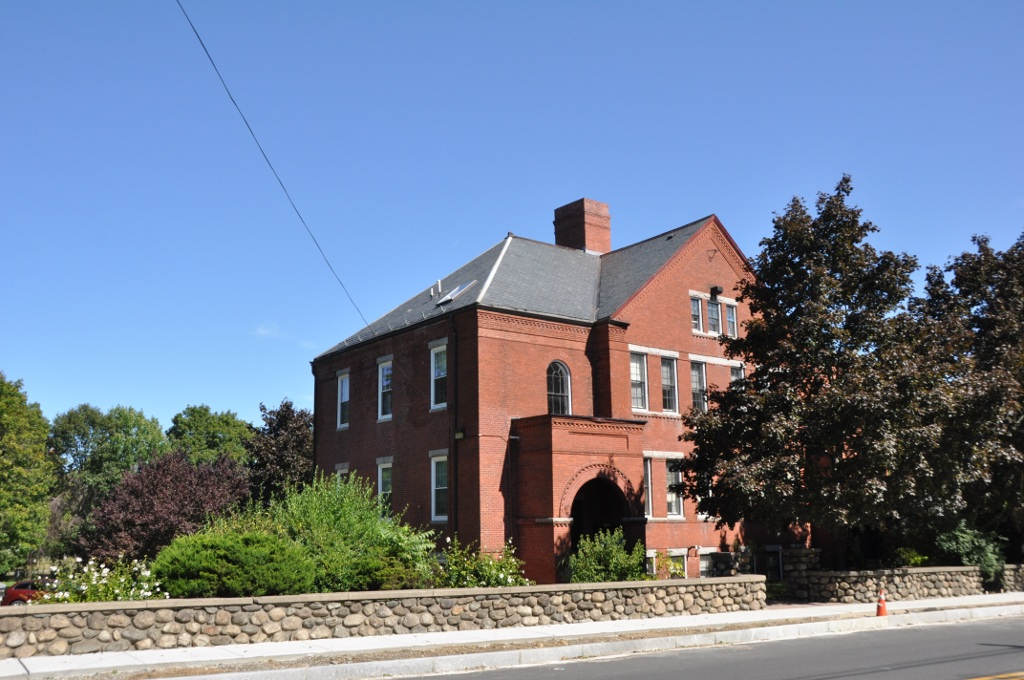
Peabody School, Bradford, MA. 1895.

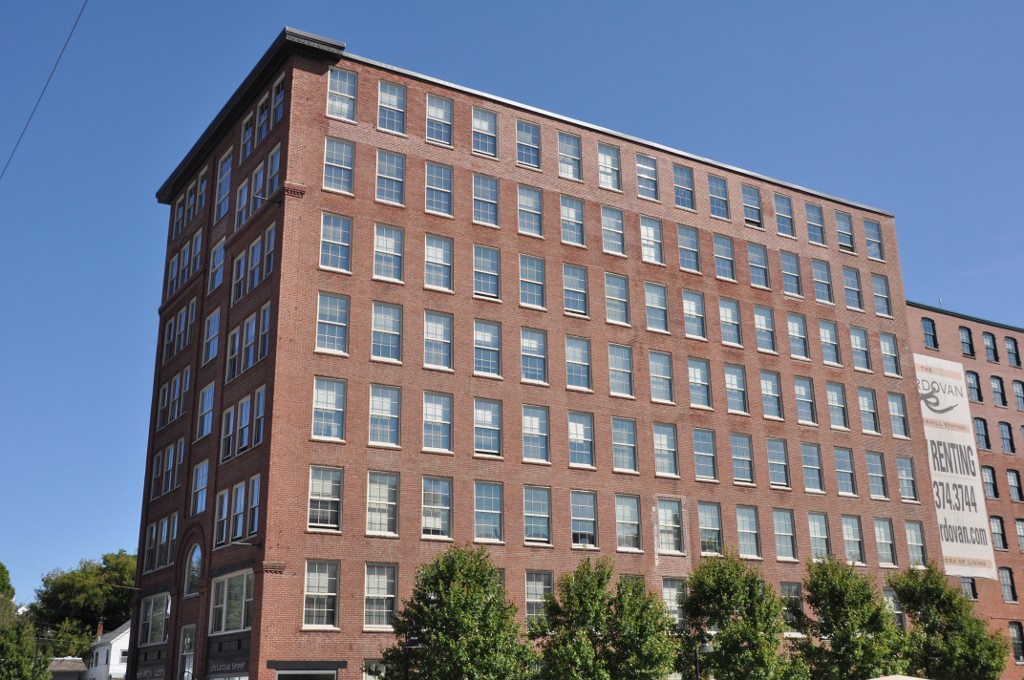
Merrimack Associates Building, Haverhill, MA. 1913.

C. Willis Damon (1850-1916) was an American architect from Haverhill, Massachusetts.

Damon was born in Pawtucket, Rhode Island in 1850. He was the son of Calvin Damon, a Universalist minister. Around 1856 the family moved to Haverhill. Damon graduated from the architectural program at the Massachusetts Institute of Technology, then only a few years old. Beginning in 1873 he was practicing architecture in Haverhill. He was the city's first college-trained architect. In 1874 or 75 he took his brother, Charles P. Damon (d.1919), as a partner. The firm, Damon Brothers, lasted until 1915, at which point Damon appears to have retired. His brother continued the practice for a few more years, doing only minor work.

== Works ==
- Winnekenni Hall (James R. Nichols Estate), 347 Kenoza Ave., Haverhill, MA (1873–75)
- James A. Hale House, 65 Cedar St., Haverhill, MA (c.1875)
- William B. Thom House, 284 Washington St., Haverhill, MA (1877)
- Jane P. Chase House, 148 Main St., Haverhill, MA (1878–79)
- William J. Edwards House, 52 Park St., Haverhill, MA (c.1878)
- Leonard V. Spaulding House, 17 Beacon St., Haverhill, MA (1878)
- First Universalist Church, 151 Main St., Kingston, NH (1879)
- Freewill Baptist Church (former), 7 Church St., Deerfield, NH (1881)
- Gatehouse (Remodeling), Grey Court (Charles H. Tenney estate), Methuen, MA (1883)
- Holley Hall, 1 South St., Bristol, VT (1884)
- Herbert O. Delano House, 23 W. Main St., Merrimac, MA (1885)
- Joel Butler House, 75 Auburn St., Haverhill, MA (1886) - Altered.
- Winthrop N. Dow House, 75 Front St., Exeter, NH (1887)
- Addison B. Jaques Duplex, 24-26 Cedar St., Haverhill, MA (1887)
- Daggett Building, 91 Merrimack St., Haverhill, MA (1887) - Demolished.
- Grafton County Courthouse, 35 S. Court St., Woodsville, NH (1889–91)
- Grafton County Courthouse, 6 Post Office Sq., Plymouth, NH (1890–91)
- Opera Block, 65 Central St., Woodsville, NH (1890)
- C. Willis Damon House, 289 Mill St., Haverhill, MA (1891) - The home of the architect.
- Rockingham County Courthouse, State St. near Penhallow, Portsmouth, NH (1891–93) - Demolished.
- Blanchard's Block, 1-3 S. Main St., Concord, NH (1894)
- Peabody School, 170 Salem St., Bradford, MA (1895)
- Arthur B. Sumner House, 295 Mill St., Haverhill, MA (1898)
- Walnut Square School, 645 Main St., Haverhill, MA (1899)
- Wilman Block, 105 Main St., Amesbury, MA (1899)
- Monument Street School, 170 Monument St., Haverhill, MA (1900) - Demolished.
- St. Gregory's R. C. School, 108 Harrison St., Haverhill, MA (1901)
- Haverhill Building Association Building, 16-38 Walnut St., Haverhill, MA (1906–08) - Also known as the Board of Trade Building.
- R. L. Wood School, 255 S. Spring St., Haverhill, MA (1906)
- Merrimack Associates Building, 25 Locust Ave., Haverhill, MA (1913)
- Essex Associates Building, 109 Essex St., Haverhill, MA (1915)
- William A. Knipe School, 97 Oxford Ave., Haverhill, MA (1915)

Damon was selected as the architect of the 1909 High School (now City Hall), but was ultimately made supervising architect for Kilham & Hopkins of Boston.
