= Camp Lincoln (New Hampshire) =

YMCA camp in Lincoln, New Hampshire

YMCA Camp Lincoln
- Interactive map of YMCA Camp Lincoln
- Location: Kingston, New Hampshire
- Coordinates: 42°55′36.03″N 71°4′29.52″W
- Established: 1926
- Operator: Southern District YMCA
- Website: ymcacamplincoln.org

YMCA Camp Lincoln (commonly referred to as "Camp Lincoln") is a camp located on Great Pond (also known as "Kingston Lake") in Kingston, New Hampshire, United States. It is run by the YMCA of the Exeter area. Camp Lincoln is most active as a summer camp, but also offers other programs and amenities, such as homeschooling, outdoor education, and corporate functions.

== History ==
According to their official website, "YMCA Camp Lincoln started as an all-boys camp that offered one-week overnight sessions throughout the summer. Today, camp is offered to both boys and girls who enjoy spending their summer days outside in the water and on the shores of Kingston Lake."

The camp was founded in 1926 when Warren Tucker sold land to the local area YMCA. The site was dedicated to the boyhood of President Abraham Lincoln.

In 2017, Camp Lincoln raised just over $32,000 for the construction of a handicap-accessible tree house to be built on-site at the camp. The tree house was dedicated to Adam McPhee, a community member who died in 1999.
