= Merrimack Associates Building =

- U.S. National Register of Historic Places
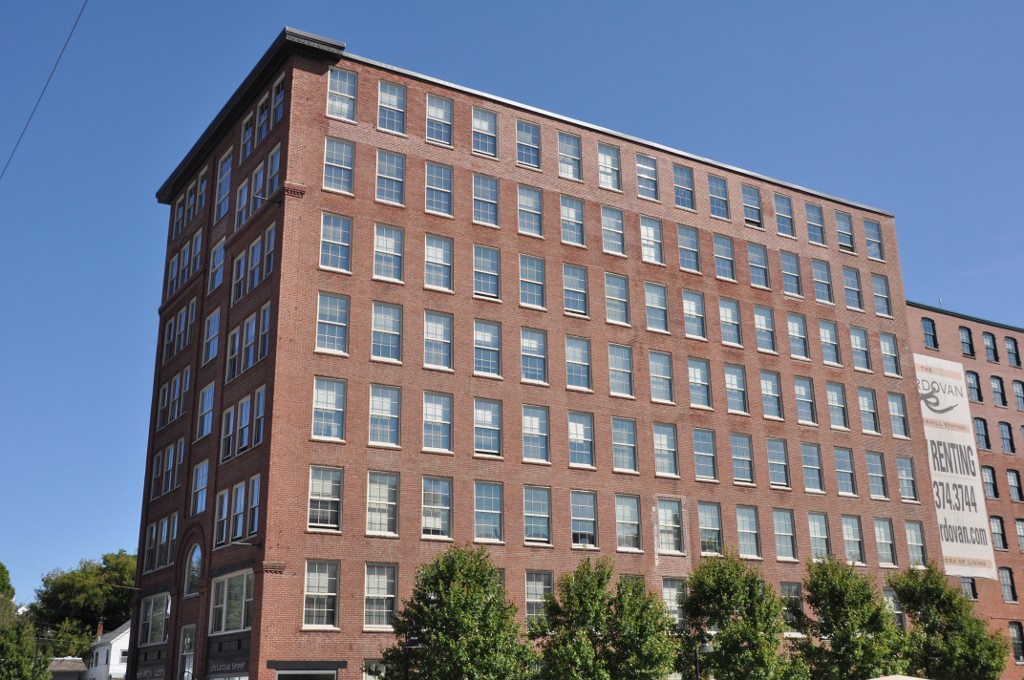

- Location within Massachusetts Location within the United States
- Location: Haverhill, Massachusetts
- Coordinates: 42°46′33″N 71°5′3″W
- Built: 1913
- Architect: Damon Brothers
- NRHP reference No.: 09000436
- Added to NRHP: June 17, 2009

The Merrimack Associates Building is a historic factory building at 25 Locust Avenue in Haverhill, Massachusetts. The eight-story brick building, built in 1913, is one of a few industrial buildings to survive redevelopment of the area north of Haverhill's main business district. It was designed by architect Damon Brothers, who also designed the nearby Haverhill Board of Trade Building. Both of these buildings were built as essentially speculative ventures to provide factory space for small businesses associated with the shoe manufacturing business that dominated Haverhill's economy in the first few decades of the 20th century. By the 1940s the building was occupied by other tenants, most notably Western Electric, which occupied the entire building in 1946. Ownership of the building came to the Hamel family in 1943, which owned the building through a series of trusts until 1986. The property has since been rehabilitated and converted to residential use.

The building was listed on the National Register of Historic Places in 2009.

== See also ==
- National Register of Historic Places listings in Essex County, Massachusetts
