= Winnekenni Castle =

Historic house in Haverhill, Massachusetts, US

Coordinates: 42.788213°N 71.06383°W

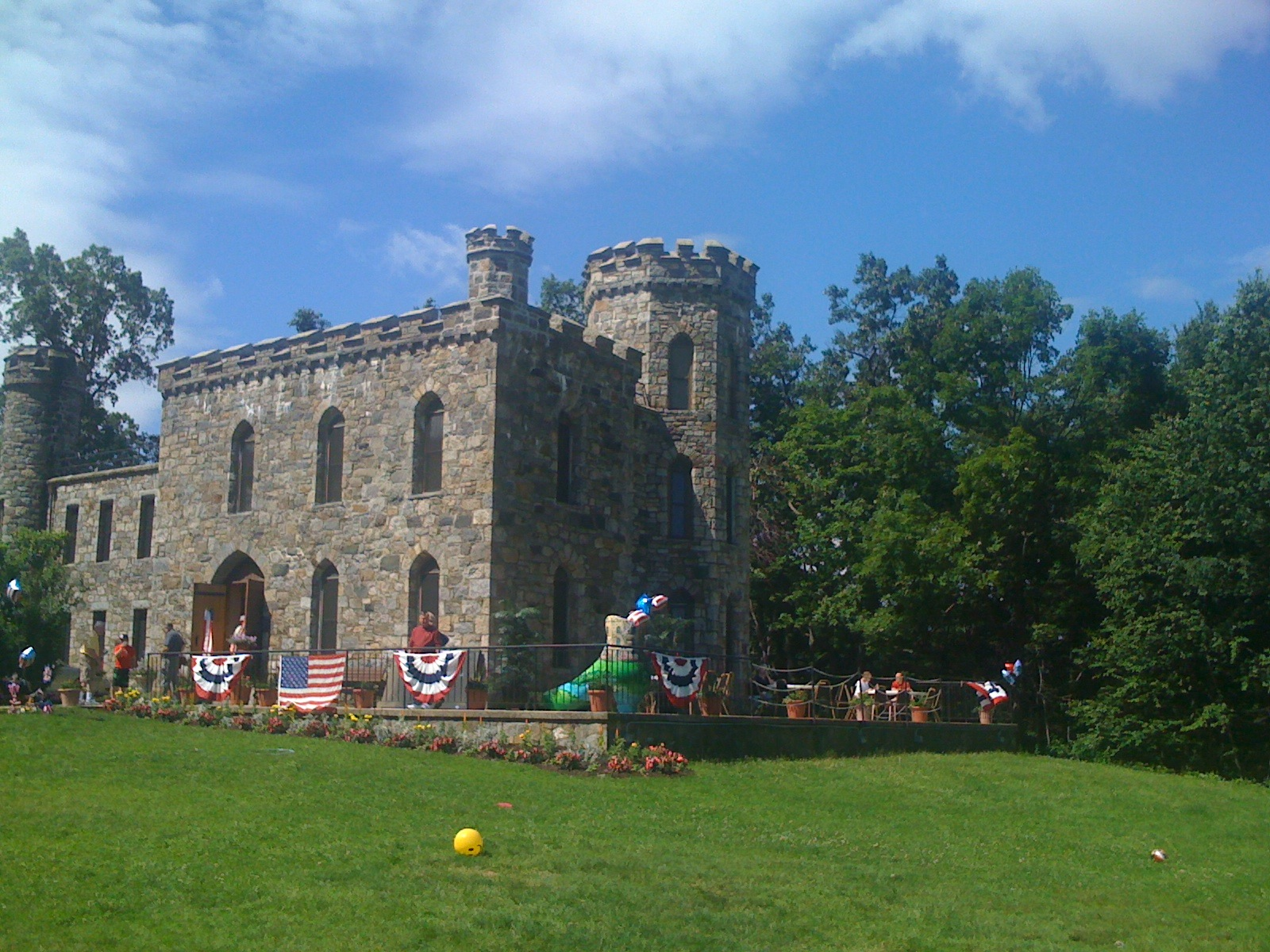

Winnekenni Castle is located in the over 700-acre Winnekenni Park Conservation Area, overlooking Kenoza Lake, in Haverhill, Massachusetts. Inspired by stone buildings he saw while visiting England, Haverhill chemist Dr. James R. Nichols built it between 1873 and 1875 as a summer home, and he named it and the surrounding land "Winnekenni," an Algonquin word meaning "very beautiful." It is one of the earliest works of Haverhill architect C. Willis Damon. The city of Haverhill purchased the castle in 1895, and in 1976, the city acquired 50.8 acres of conservation land between the Castle and Lake Saltonstall. The Castle's elaborate Victorian interior was destroyed by a fire in 1969, which led to the formation of the Winnekenni Foundation by a group of citizens. Today, the foundation is responsible for the upkeep of the castle and the surrounding land and trails. Under the direction and guidance of carpentry teacher Paul Crowley and carpentry students from Whittier Regional Vocational Technical High School, they were able to complete a refurbishing and remodeling of the building.
