= First Universalist Church (Kingston, New Hampshire) =

Historic church in New Hampshire, United States

- U.S. National Register of Historic Places
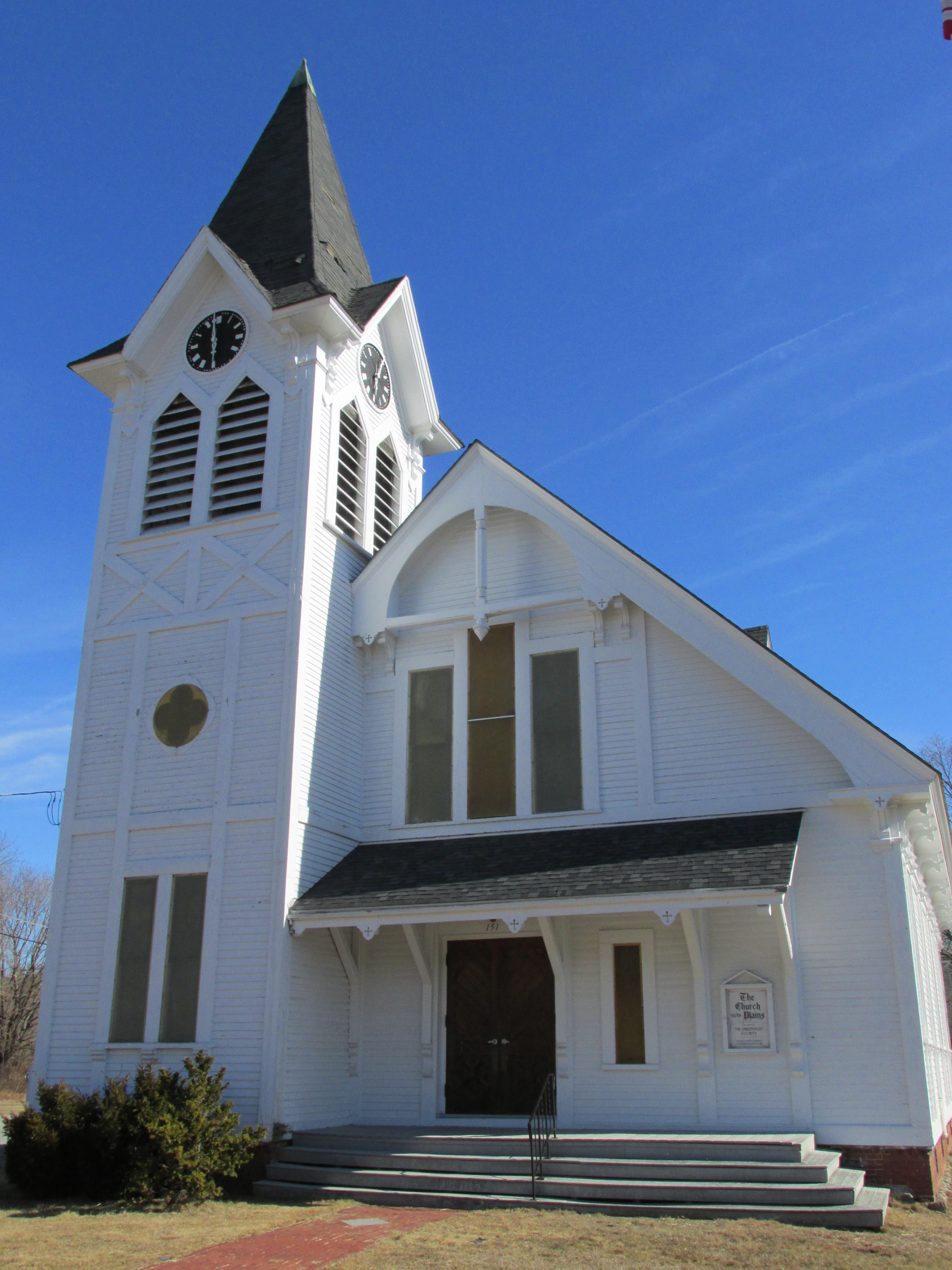
- First Universalist Church

- Location within New Hampshire Location within the United States
- Location: Main St., Kingston, New Hampshire
- Coordinates: 42°56′0″N 71°3′15″W
- Area: 0.2 acres (0.081 ha)
- Built: 1879
- Architect: C. Willis Damon
- Architectural style: Stick/Eastlake
- NRHP reference No.: 79000204
- Added to NRHP: December 26, 1979

The First Universalist Church, known locally as the Church on the Plains, is a historic church building on Main Street in Kingston, New Hampshire. Built in 1879 to a design by the regionally prominent architect C. Willis Damon, it is a fine local example of Stick/Eastlake architecture. It was listed on the National Register of Historic Places in 1979, and is now owned by the local historical society.

== Description and history ==
The former First Universalist Church building is located in the town center of Kingston, on the east side of its expansive common at the southwest corner of Main Street and Cemetery Lane. It is a rectangular wood-frame structure, with a gable roof and a four-stage square tower projecting out of its northwest corner. The first stage of the tower has paired stencilled rectangular windows, and the second has single four-leaf-clover windows. The third stage is louvered on all four sides, and houses the church bell. The last level has clock faces on all four sides, and the steeple rises above. To the right of the tower is a single-story porch, its shed roof supported by large wooden brackets. Above that in the gable end is a three-part Palladian window, and the gable itself is decorated with Stick style woodwork. The interior has stencilwork done by unknown craftsmen.

The church was built in 1879 to a design by C. Willis Damon of Haverhill, Massachusetts. Damon was considered one of that city's leading architects, having designed a number of its industrial buildings and the old Haverhill High School. His credits in New Hampshire include an academy building in Tilton and the Portsmouth courthouse. This church was deconsecrated in 1954, and donated to the local historical society in 1974.

== See also ==
- National Register of Historic Places listings in Rockingham County, New Hampshire
