= Woodsville Opera Building =

- U.S. National Register of Historic Places
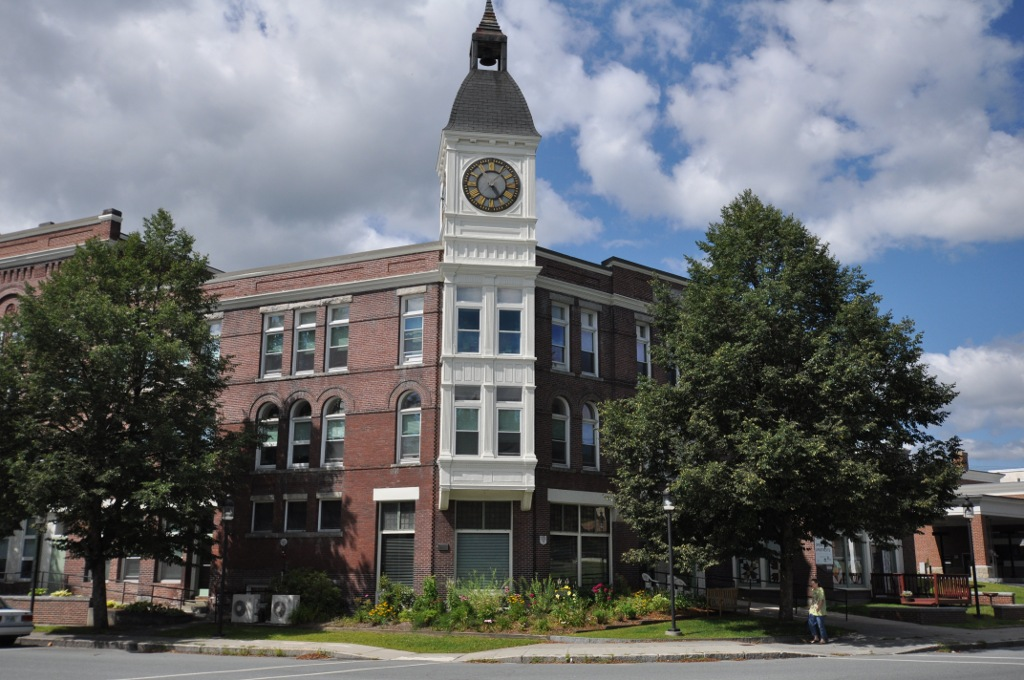

- Location within New Hampshire Location within the United States
- Location: 67 Central St., Woodsville, New Hampshire
- Coordinates: 44°9′8″N 72°2′18″W
- Area: less than one acre
- Built: 1890
- Built by: S. S. Ordway & Company
- Architect: Damon Brothers
- Architectural style: Romanesque
- NRHP reference No.: 80000288
- Added to NRHP: May 15, 1980

The Woodsville Opera Building is a historic commercial and performance building at 67 Central Street in Woodsville, New Hampshire, the commercial center of the town of Haverhill. Built in 1890, it is a local architectural landmark, and includes a performance venue that has been used for many local events, including high school graduations and proms. The building was listed on the National Register of Historic Places in 1980.

== Description and history ==
The Woodsville Opera Building occupies a prominent location in the Woodsville business district, at the southwest corner of Court and Central streets (New Hampshire Route 135 and U.S. Route 302, respectively). Its most distinctive feature, a four-story clock tower set at an angle to the street corner, makes it a local landmark. It has Romanesque Revival and Panel Brick styling, with round-arch windows on the second floor, and a round-arched main entrance bay facing Central Street. The building interior originally housed a combination of commercial retail and office spaces, in addition to the opera house.

The block was built in 1890 by E. B. Mann and the Woodsville Opera Building Society. The building includes a performing venue that seats 600, and was for many years a center of civic life in the community, hosting high school graduations, proms, and other events. For many years it housed the Mann pharmacy, which claimed to be one of the longest-running drugstores in the nation. Portions of the building have been converted to affordable housing.

== See also ==
- National Register of Historic Places listings in Grafton County, New Hampshire
