= The 1686 House =

Restaurant in New Hampshire, United States

Coordinates: 42.929649°N 71.053940°W

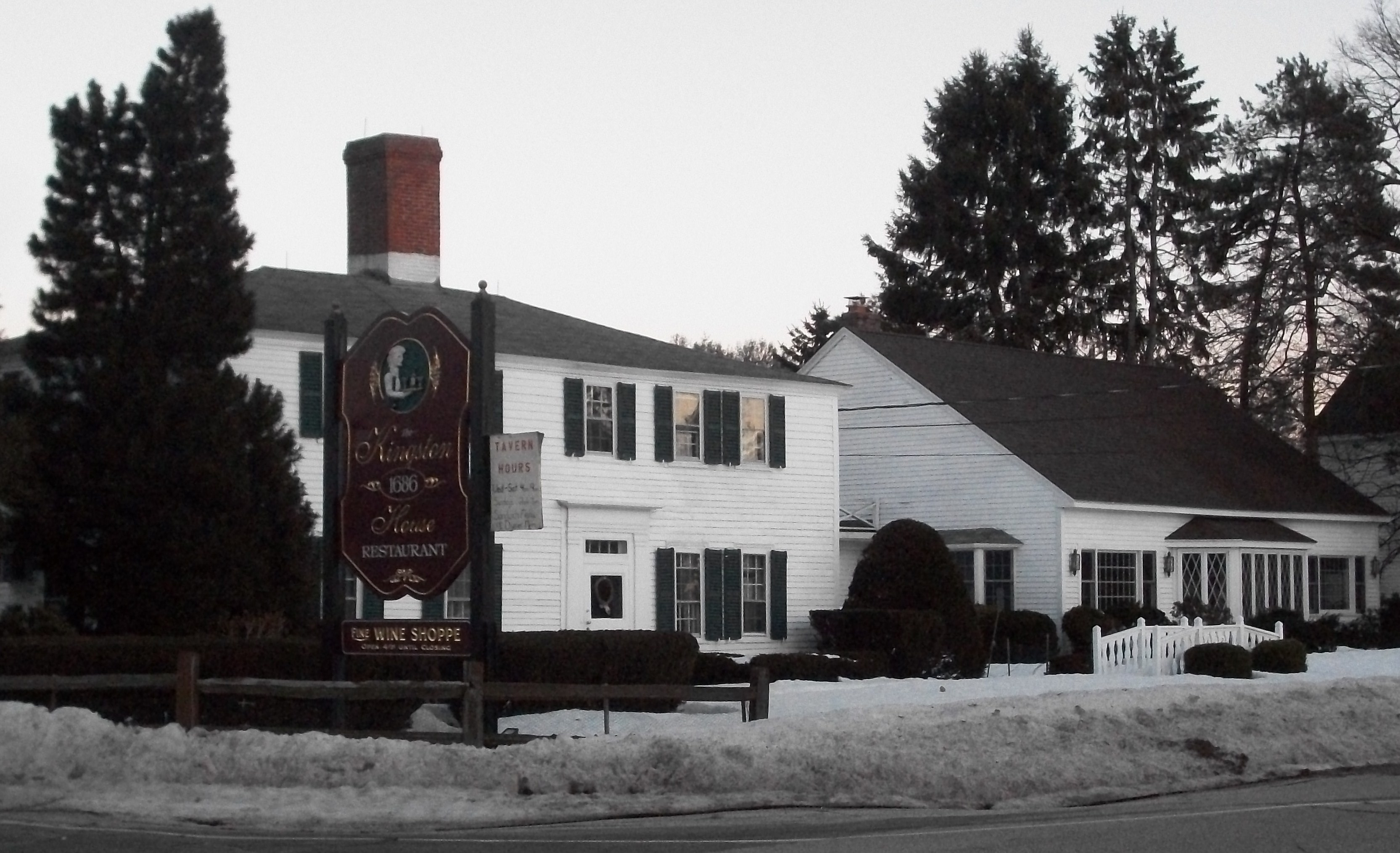
Front View of The 1686 House from the corner of Scotland Road and Main Street

The 1686 House is a fine dining restaurant in Kingston, New Hampshire, USA, that is best known for its extensive wine list and colonial decor. In 1992, it won one of the six 1992 Grand Awards for Outstanding Restaurant Wine Lists given by Wine Spectator.

The 1686 House is located in the historic district of Kingston and is one of the oldest buildings in the town. It was originally built as a residential home. The basement of the building originally had escape tunnels that were built in case of an attack by Native Americans.

The 1686 House has hosted political fundraisers for New Hampshire primary candidates. It also hosts other functions, including wedding receptions.
