= Kingston State Park =

State park in Rockingham County, New Hampshire

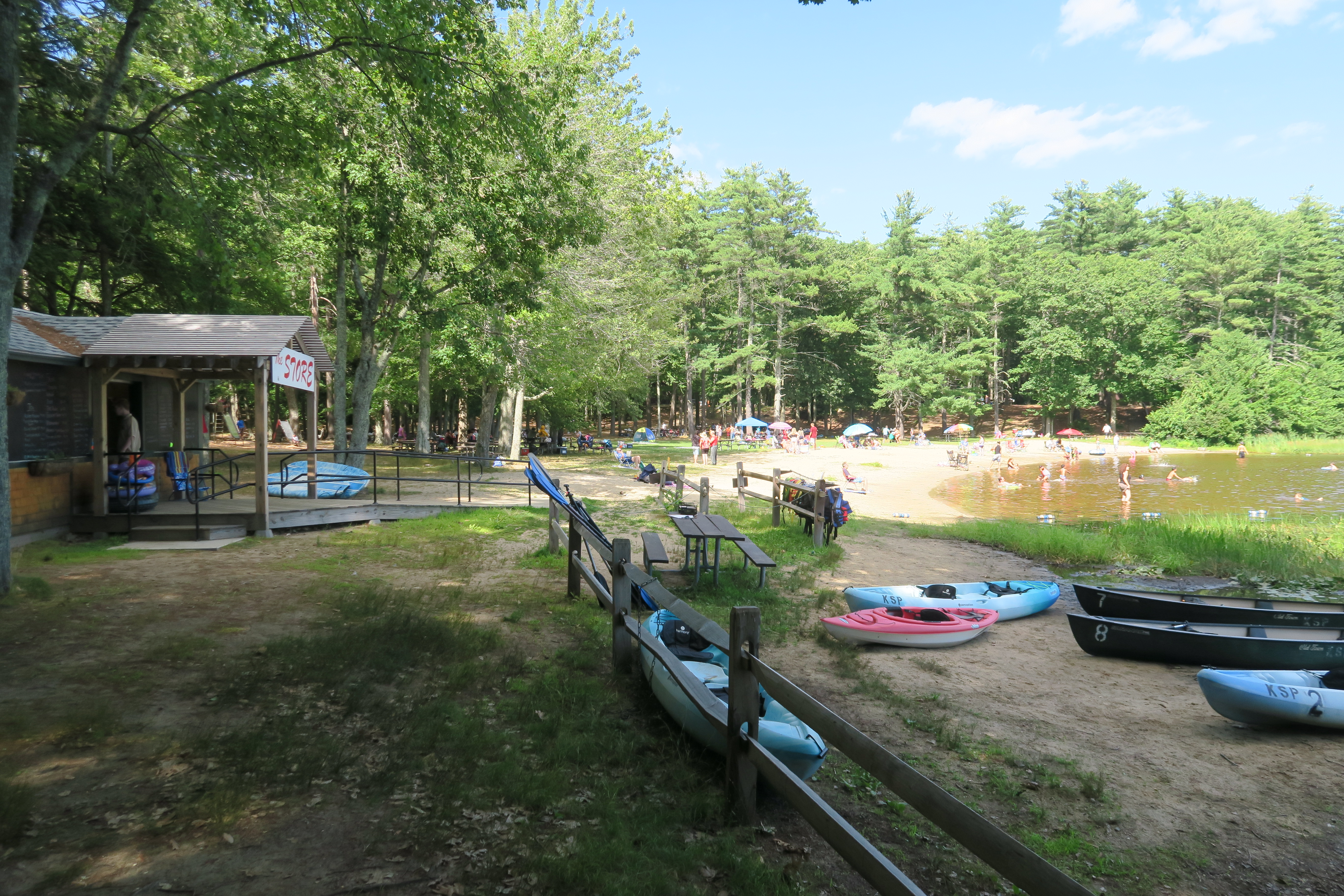
- Interactive map of Kingston State Park
- Location: Kingston, New Hampshire, United States
- Coordinates: 42°55′44″N 71°03′18″W
- Area: 44 acres (18 ha)
- Established: 1933
- Administrator: New Hampshire Division of Parks and Recreation
- Website: Official website
New Hampshire State Parks
Kingston State Park
- Location within New Hampshire

Kingston State Park is a 44-acre (18 ha) state park located on Great Pond in the town of Kingston, New Hampshire. The park offers 300 feet (91 m) of swim area with bathhouse, canoe rentals, fireplaces and picnic areas, playground, softball field, areas for horseshoes and volleyball, and pavilion. The park connects to Rock Rimmon State Forest. Land for the park was purchased in 1933 using $3,500 in state relief funds.
