= Great Pond (New Hampshire) =

Lake in Rockingham County, New Hampshire

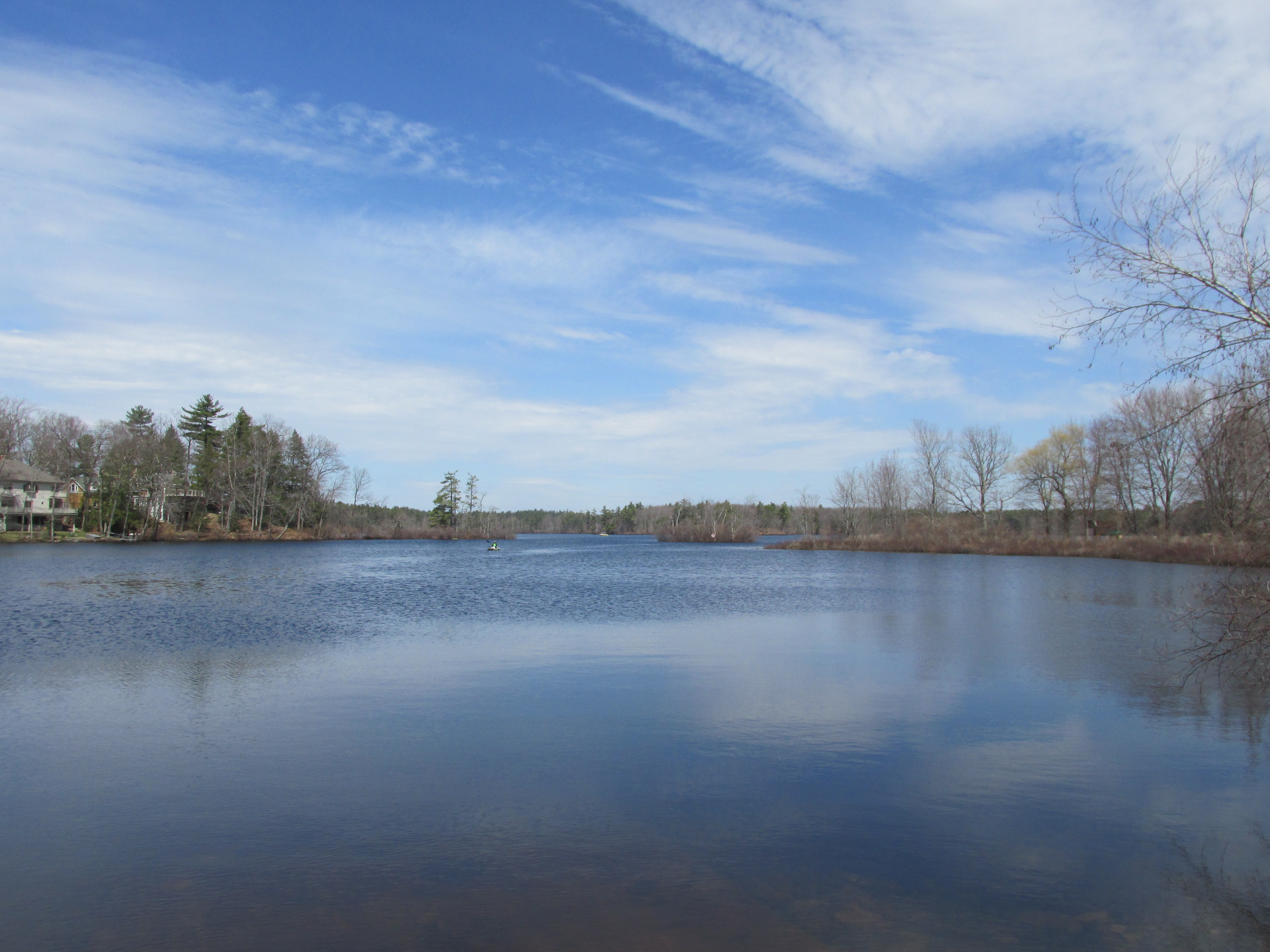
- Great Pond

- Location within New Hampshire Location within the United States
- Location: Rockingham County, New Hampshire
- Coordinates: 42°55′19″N 71°3′45″W
- Primary inflows: Powwow River
- Primary outflows: Powwow River
- Basin countries: United States
- Max. length: 1.1 mi (1.8 km)
- Max. width: 0.6 mi (0.97 km)
- Surface area: 268 acres (1.08 km^{2})
- Average depth: 21 ft (6.4 m)
- Max. depth: 50 ft (15 m)
- Surface elevation: 119 ft (36 m)
- Settlements: Kingston

Great Pond is a 268-acre (1.08 km^{2}) water body in Rockingham County in southeastern New Hampshire in the United States. The lake lies near the center of the town of Kingston. Kingston State Park, a small preserve with a swimming beach, occupies the northeastern end of the lake, near the town center. The lake is located along the Powwow River, a tributary of the Merrimack River.

The lake is classified as a warmwater fishery, with observed species including smallmouth bass, largemouth bass, chain pickerel, white perch, black crappie, bluegill, yellow perch, and pumpkinseed.

YMCA Camp Lincoln is on the northwest side of the lake.

== See also ==
- List of lakes in New Hampshire
