= Nichols Memorial Library =

- U.S. National Register of Historic Places
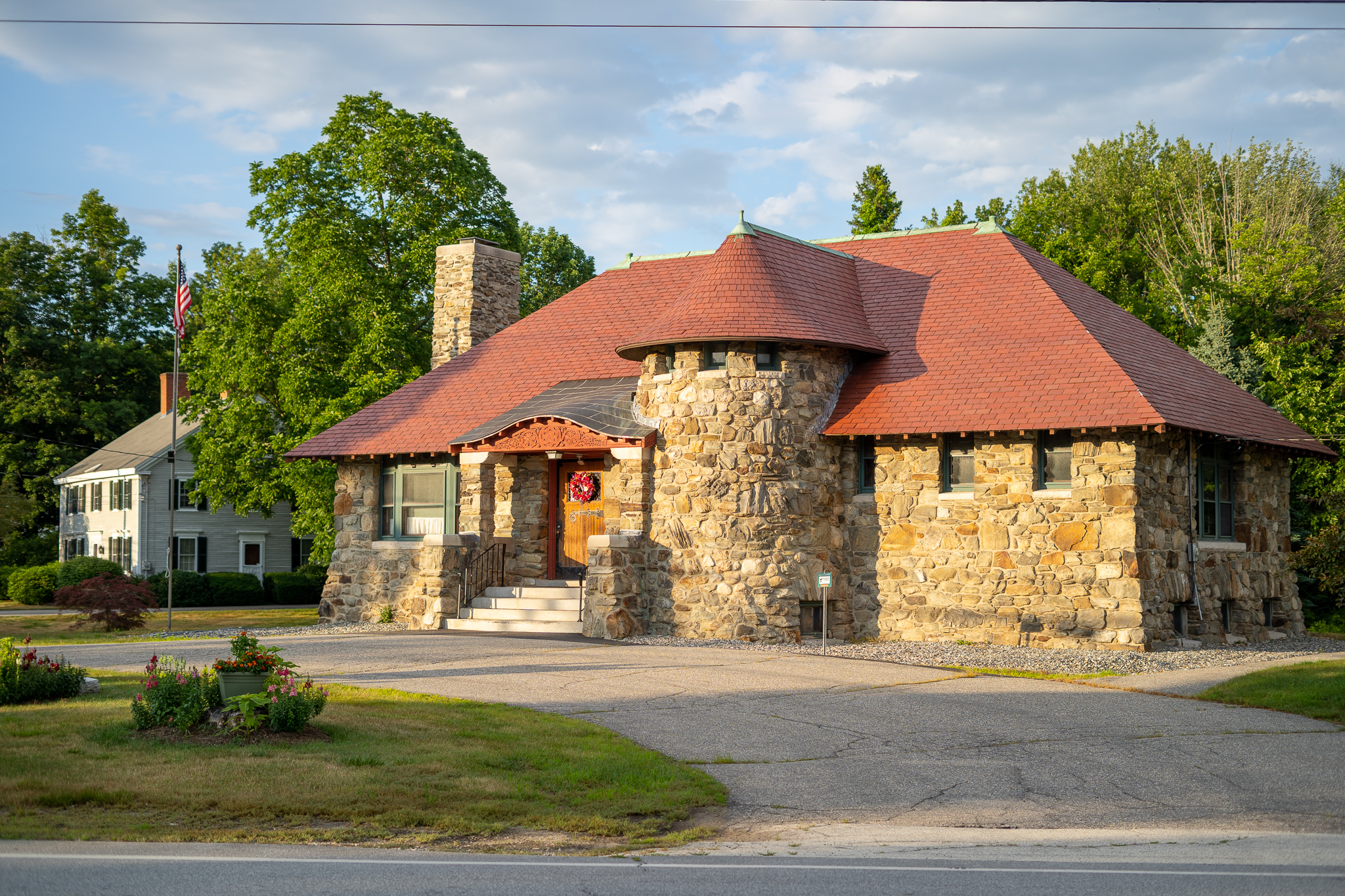

- Location within New Hampshire Location within the United States
- Location: Main St., Kingston, New Hampshire
- Coordinates: 42°56′12″N 71°3′12″W
- Area: 0.5 acres (0.20 ha)
- Built: 1898
- Architect: Dwight & Chandler
- Architectural style: Romanesque, Richardsonian Romanesque
- NRHP reference No.: 81000076
- Added to NRHP: January 28, 1981

The Nichols Memorial Library is a historic library building on Main Street in Kingston, New Hampshire, United States. Built in 1898, it is distinctive statewide as the only local library building exhibiting Shingle style and Richardsonian Romanesque features. It was used as the town library until 2012, and now houses the town's research collection and archives. The building was listed on the National Register of Historic Places in 1981.

== Description and history ==
The former Nichols Memorial Library building stands in the village center of Kingston, at the eastern corner of Main and Depot Streets. The building is a single-story irregular stone structure with a red slate hip roof, and a fieldstone chimney at one side. A semicircular section projects from the front facade, just to the right of the main entrance, which is sheltered under an eyebrow-gabled portico. Window openings are generally square or rectangular and vary in size. The largest of them have stained glass transoms depicting the marks of historic early bookmakers.

The building was designed by Dwight and Chandler of Boston and completed in 1898. It was built as a gift to the town by Kingston native J. Howard Nichols, a Boston industrialist and philanthropist. The building is distinctive statewide as the only local library building exhibiting Shingle style and Richardsonian Romanesque features. The building served as a library until 2012, when the library relocated to new quarters at 2 Library Lane. The building now serves as a research library, specializing in genealogical research, and is an extension of the Kingston Community Library, housing the town's archives and the Kingston Historical Museum's collections.

== See also ==
- National Register of Historic Places listings in Rockingham County, New Hampshire
