= Tenney Castle Gatehouse =

- U.S. National Register of Historic Places
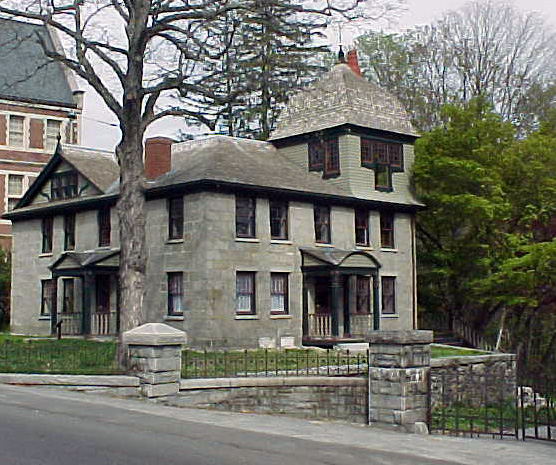

- Location within Massachusetts Location within the United States
- Location: Methuen, Massachusetts
- Coordinates: 42°43′46″N 71°11′4″W
- Built: 1840
- Architect: Damon Brothers
- Architectural style: Queen Anne
- MPS: Methuen MRA
- NRHP reference No.: 84002438
- Added to NRHP: January 20, 1984

The Tenney Castle Gatehouse is a historic gatehouse at 37 Pleasant Street in Methuen, Massachusetts, United States. It was added to the National Register of Historic Places on January 20, 1984. It is the only surviving element of the large estate of Charles H. Tenney, a leading local industrialist.

== History ==
The gatehouse was originally a two-story rough stone farm house built by Richard Whittier between August and November 1830. In April 1882, it was purchased by Charles H. Tenney. It was redesigned in 1883 by architects Damon Brothers into a gatehouse for the 76-acre (310,000 m^{2}) Tenney estate known as Grey Court.

When first built, it was a two-story stone structure with five bays on its front facade and a central entry. The modifications by Damon gave the building a distinctive Queen Anne Victorian character, changing the roof to be hipped, and adding an ornately decorated tower with weathervane on one corner. A porch was added to shelter the entry, whose gable has rows of decorative shingles. The interior features Anglo-Japanese wallpaper that was replicated in 1999.

In 1951, the Tenney family gave 26 acres (110,000 m^{2}) to the town for Tenney High School (now Tenney Grammar School). The family offered the castle and the 80-acre estate to the town of Methuen which rejected the generous gift. It was later sold to the Basilian Salvatorian Order. In the 1970s, after the Basilian Salvatorian Order vacated the property, the castle was used as a substance abuse treatment center and was then abandoned, boarded-up, looted and vandalized. A series of fires over a number of years heavily damaged the mansion. A major fire, intentionally set, destroyed the roof and most of the interior. Instead of preserving the still-impressive ruins of this Carrere and Hastings Beaux-Arts mansion, which despite the fire, still featured original exterior terracotta details, brickwork, and granite walls, the remains were almost completely demolished by approval of the Massachusetts Department of Environmental Management. The town government of Methuen did not act to prevent the demolition either. Of the mansion, only a very small corner and a section of the interior courtyard arcade exist. The ruins are currently in poor condition and continue to be vandalized. The Gatehouse, is now home to the Methuen Museum of History and maintained by the Methuen Historical Society. The Stock House or Stables remain standing as part of the original estate. The Tenney estate is currently a Massachusetts state park, known as Greycourt Park.

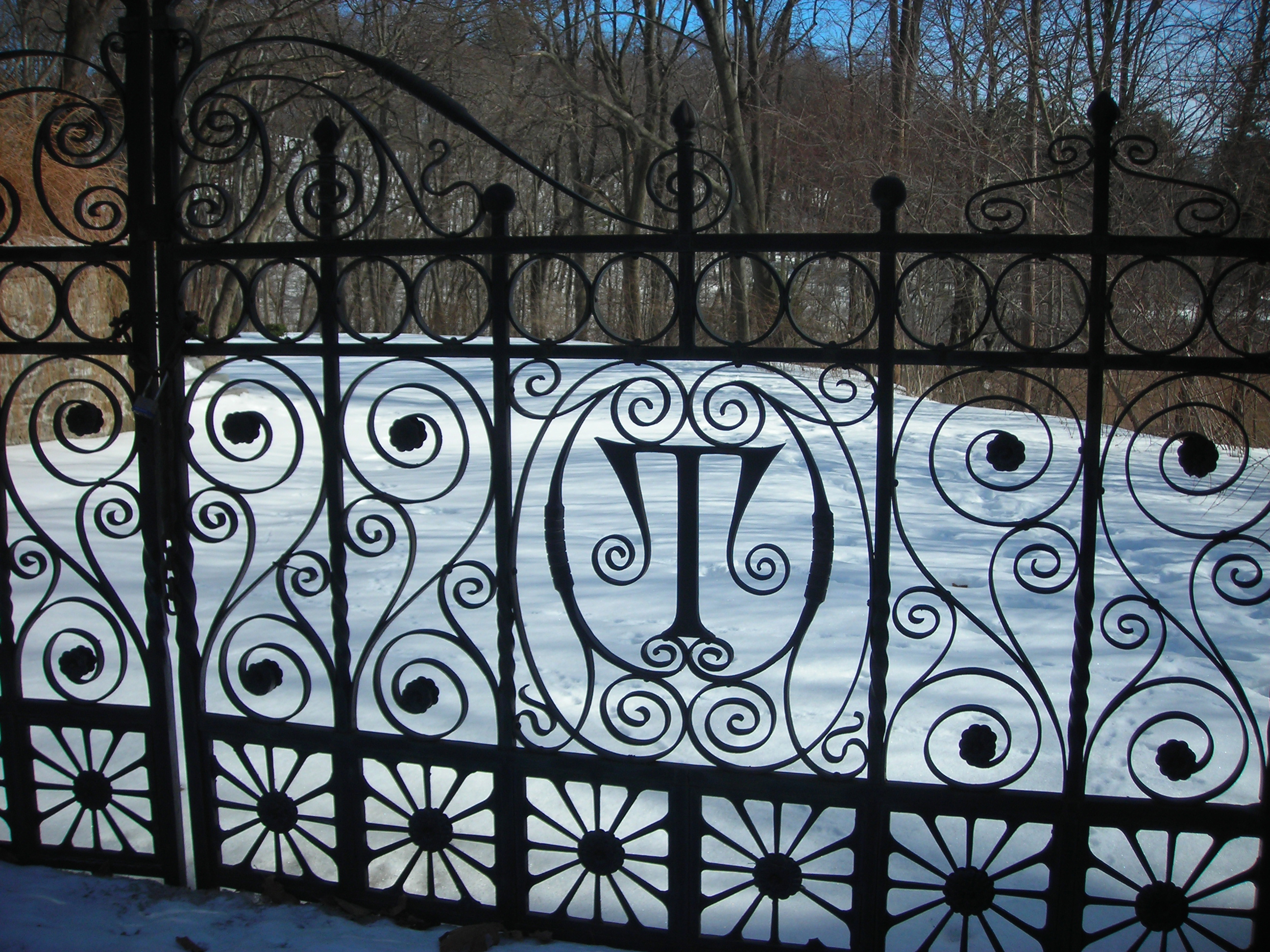

== See also ==
- National Register of Historic Places listings in Methuen, Massachusetts
- National Register of Historic Places listings in Essex County, Massachusetts
