= Sanborn Regional High School =

Coordinates: 42°54′44″N 71°04′22″W

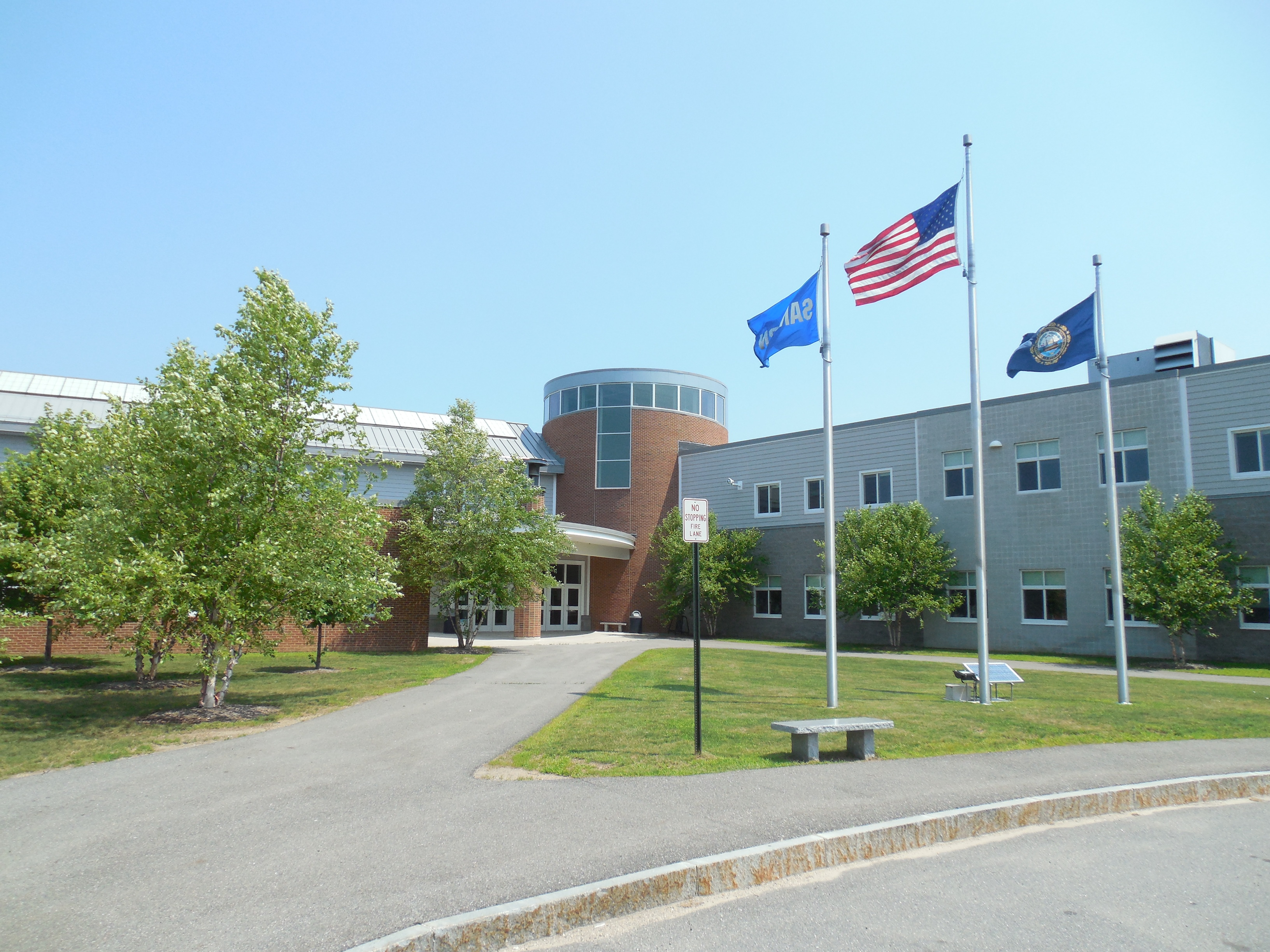

Location
- 17 Danville Rd; Kingston, New Hampshire 03848; USA

Information
- Type: Public
- Established: 1883
- Principal: Jennifer Michitson
- Teaching staff: 41.90 (FTE)
- Enrollment: 521 (2023-2024)
- Student to teacher ratio: 12.43
- Campus: 1 building Rural
- Colors: Navy and gray
- Athletics: Baseball, Football, basketball, cross country, field hockey, golf, soccer, tennis, track and field, winter track, fall and winter spirit, bowling,
- Mascot: Indians
- Website: srhs.sau17.net

Sanborn Regional High School is located in Kingston, New Hampshire and serves the towns of Kingston, Newton, and Fremont. SRHS is a part of the Sanborn Regional School District. The school has a current population of approximately 450 students.

== Administration ==
Jennifer Mitchison, Principal; Robert Dawson, Assistant Principal/Athletic Director; Nichole O'Brien, Associate Principal; Joshua White, Asst. Principal; and Sean Sullivan, Asst. Principal

== Notable alumni ==
- Rachel Wiggin Gould, bass player of The Shaggs (1960's and 1970's all-female group from Fremont, NH)

== See also ==
- Sanborn Seminary
- Kingston, New Hampshire
