= Walnut Grove Cemetery =

Historic cemetery in Massachusetts, United States

- U.S. National Register of Historic Places
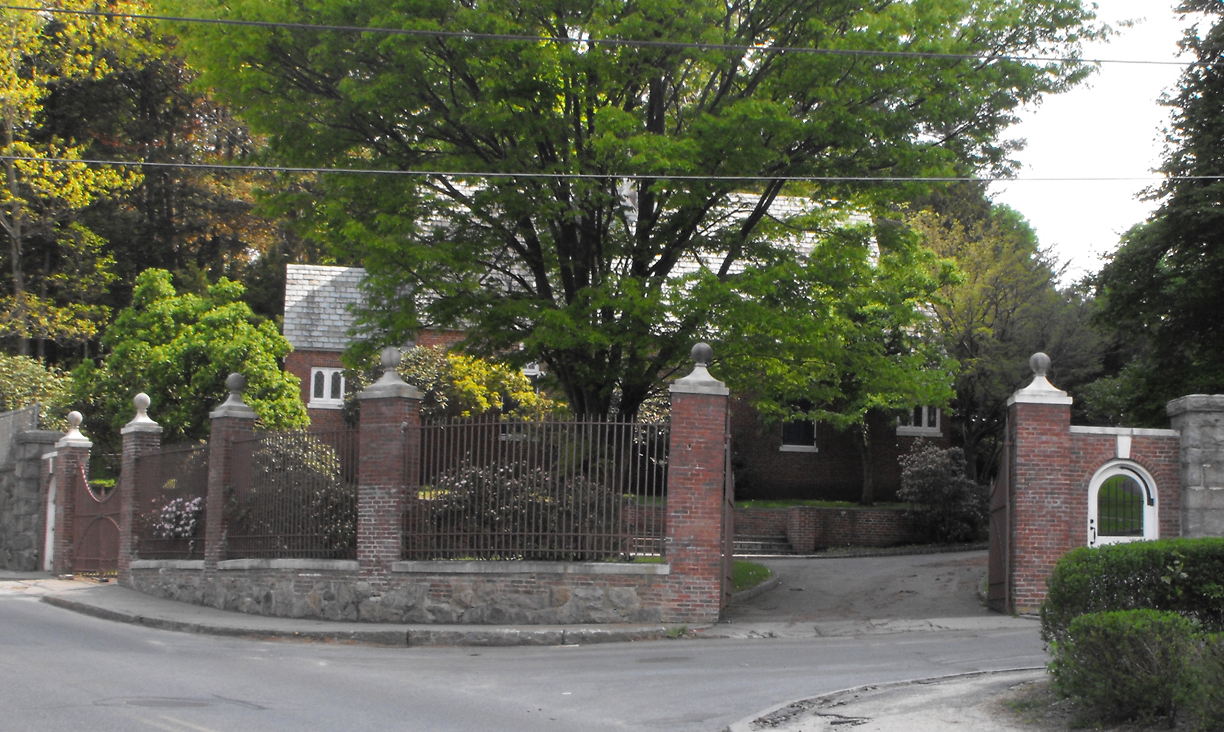

- Location within Massachusetts Location within the United States
- Location: Methuen, Massachusetts
- Coordinates: 42°43′23″N 71°11′27″W
- Built: 1853
- MPS: Methuen MRA
- NRHP reference No.: 84002444
- Added to NRHP: January 20, 1984

Walnut Grove Cemetery is a historic cemetery at Grove and Railroads Streets in Methuen, Massachusetts. The still active cemetery sits on 14 acres (5.7 ha) and is privately funded with a board of directors. The cemetery was established in 1853, and was laid out in the then-popular rural cemetery style. The Tenney Memorial Chapel given by the Daniel G. Tenney in 1927 as a memorial to his parents Charles H. Tenney and Fannie Haseltine (Gleason) Tenney. The chapel was designed by architect Grosvenor Atterbury. The earliest burial is estimated to be about 1850; whereas the number of burials before 1960 is unknown, there have been 896 burials since 1960.

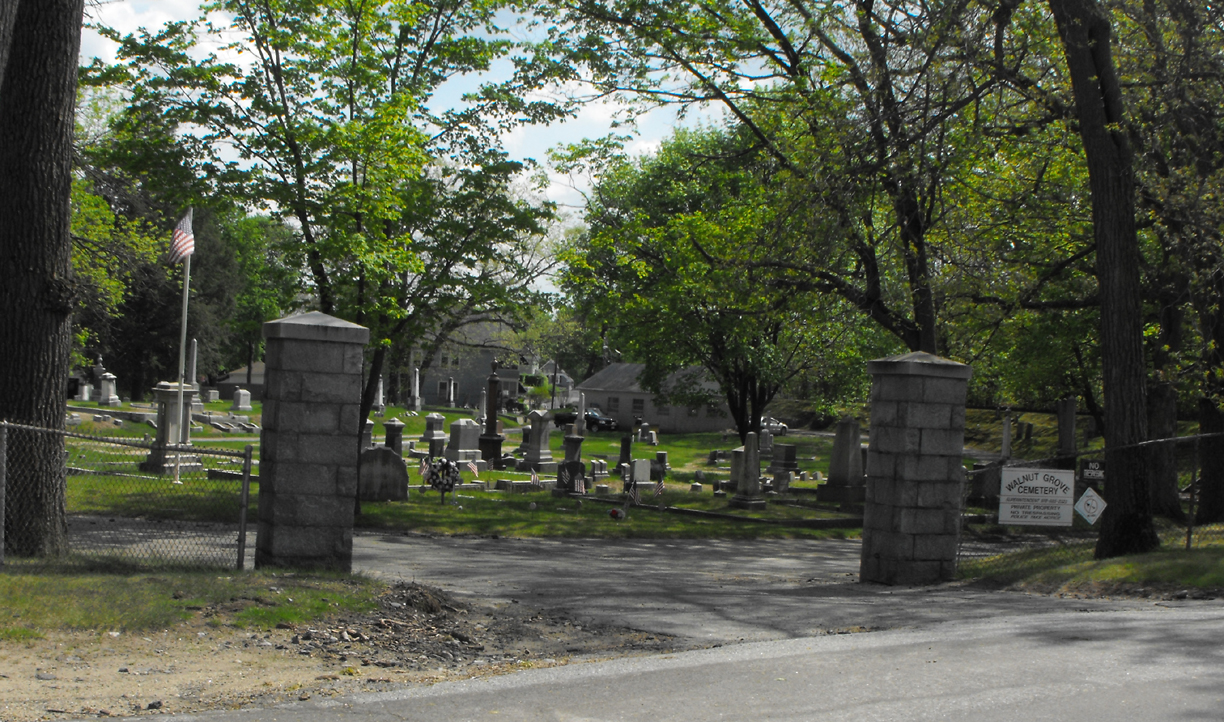
Walnut Grove Cemetery

The cemetery was added to the National Register of Historic Places in 1984.

== See also ==
- National Register of Historic Places listings in Methuen, Massachusetts
