= Peabody School (Haverhill, Massachusetts) =

- U.S. National Register of Historic Places
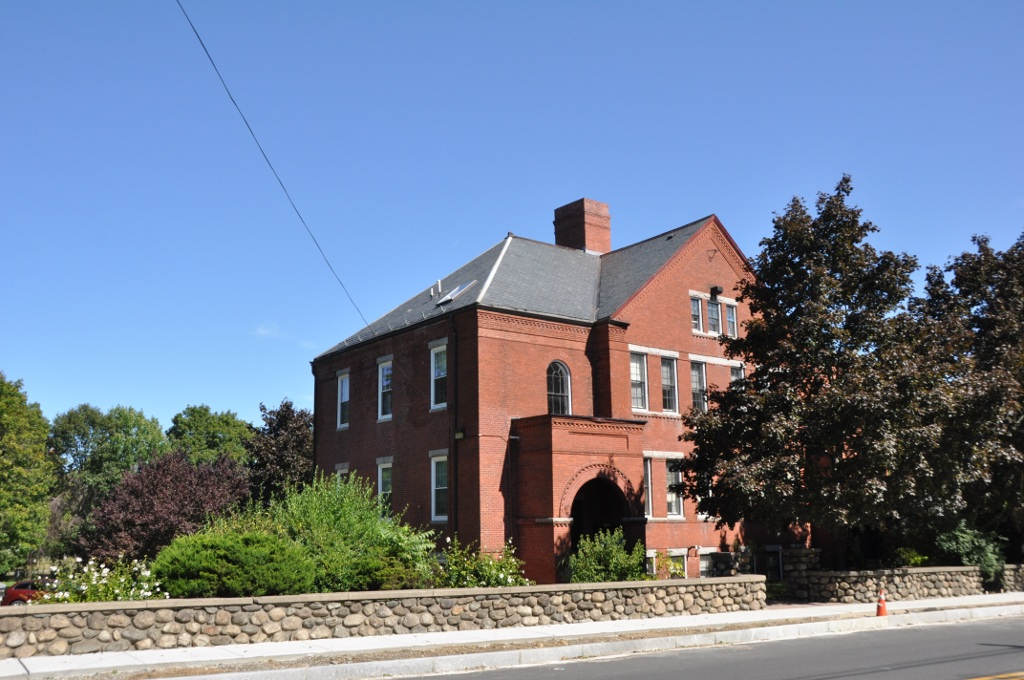

- Location within Massachusetts Location within the United States
- Location: Haverhill, Massachusetts
- Coordinates: 42°45′48″N 71°4′15″W
- Built: 1895
- Architect: Damon Brothers
- Architectural style: Romanesque
- NRHP reference No.: 86002900
- Added to NRHP: October 23, 1986

The Peabody School is a historic school building at 160 Salem Street in Haverhill, Massachusetts. The two story Romanesque Revival brick and stone building was built in 1895 by architects Damon Brothers for the town of Bradford (which was annexed to Haverhill two years later); it was the last school building Bradford built. The building was designed with the latest innovations in educational buildings, including amply sized classrooms with plenty of ventilation (including a heating system) and natural lighting.

The building was listed on the National Register of Historic Places in 1986, at which time it was vacant.

The building now houses eight condo units, while still maintaining the original historic elements of the architecture.

== See also ==
- National Register of Historic Places listings in Essex County, Massachusetts
