= Endicott Hotel (Concord, New Hampshire) =

- U.S. National Register of Historic Places
- U.S. Historic district – Contributing property
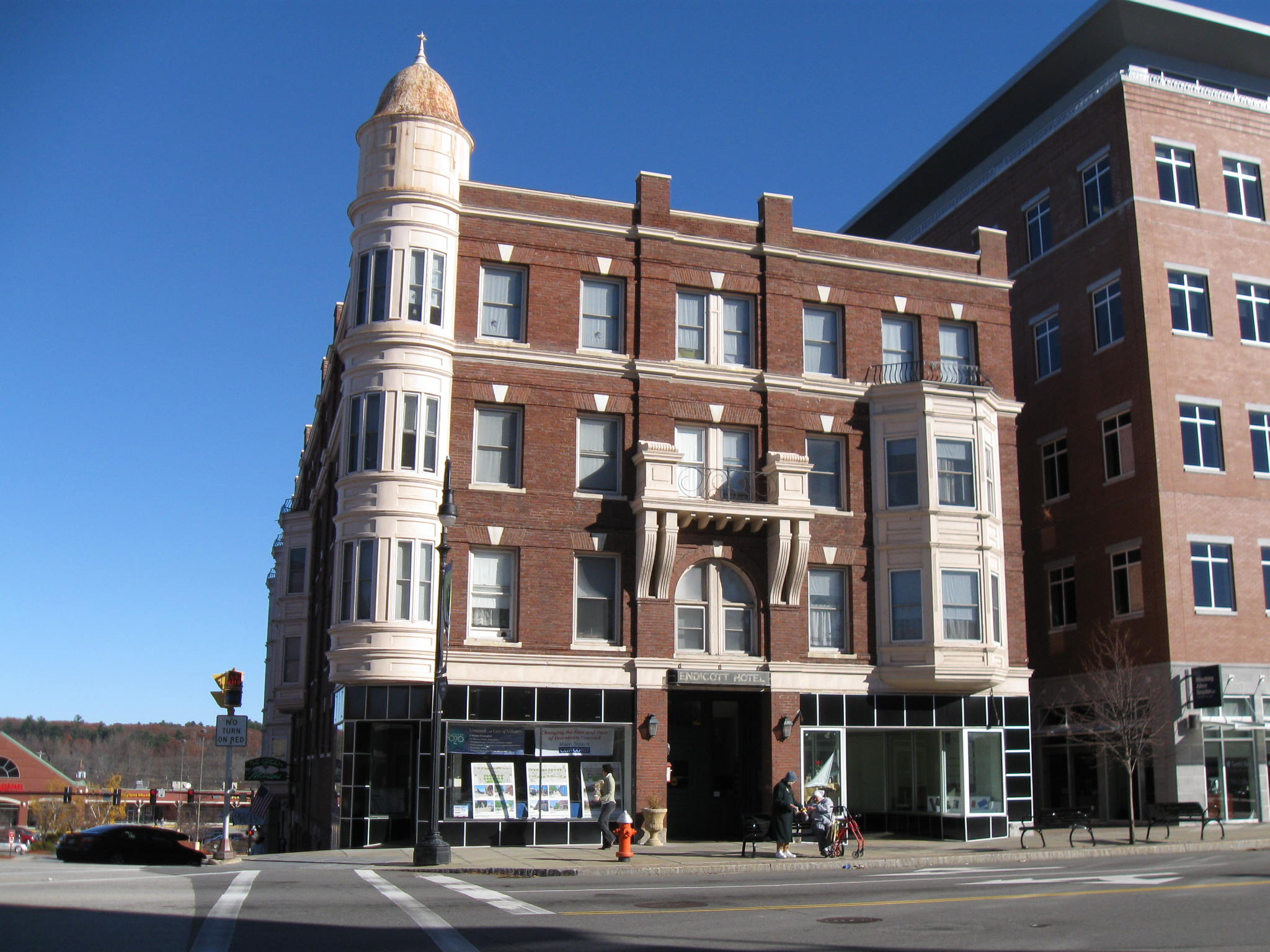

- Location within New Hampshire Location within the United States
- Location: 1-3 S. Main St., Concord, New Hampshire
- Coordinates: 43°12′14″N 71°32′9″W
- Area: less than one acre
- Built: 1892
- Architect: Damon Brothers
- Part of: Downtown Concord Historic District (ID00000652)
- NRHP reference No.: 87000818

Significant dates
- Added to NRHP: May 29, 1987
- Designated CP: June 9, 2000

The Endicott Hotel (formerly Blanchard's Block) is a historic hotel building at 1-3 South Main Street in Concord, New Hampshire. Completed in 1894, it is the only known surviving work in the state of the regionally prominent Damon Brothers architects, and it was the first major commercial building on South Main Street. It was listed on the National Register of Historic Places in 1987.

== Description and history ==
The Endicott Hotel is prominently located in downtown Concord, at the southeast corner of South Main Street and Pleasant Street Extension. It is a four-story brick building, with a basement that is partially exposed due to the lot's sloping terrain. Its most prominent feature is the oriel tower at the northwest corner, a signature element of Damon Brothers design. The ground-floor storefronts facing South Main Street are finished in black tile, an Art Deco alteration of the 1940s, which are the only major exterior alteration. The main building entrance is recessed in the center of the South Main Street facade, with an arched window above it on the second floor, and a heavily bracketed balcony on the third floor. The rightmost window bay has a projecting oriel bay on the second and third floors.

The building was completed in 1894 to a design by the regionally notable Damon Brothers architects. It was the city's first large commercial building south of Pleasant Street, and the first devoted exclusively to commercial activities. (The earlier buildings included civic and social meeting spaces on upper levels.) Its exterior has undergone only modest alterations. The building's first owner was George Blanchard, under whose ownership it was used for commercial and office space. In 1908 it was purchased by John Butler Smith, who converted it to a hotel serving travelers arriving at the nearby railroad station, and gave the building its present name. In 1985 the upper floors were converted to apartments.

== See also ==
- National Register of Historic Places listings in Merrimack County, New Hampshire
