= Sanborn Seminary =

- U.S. National Register of Historic Places
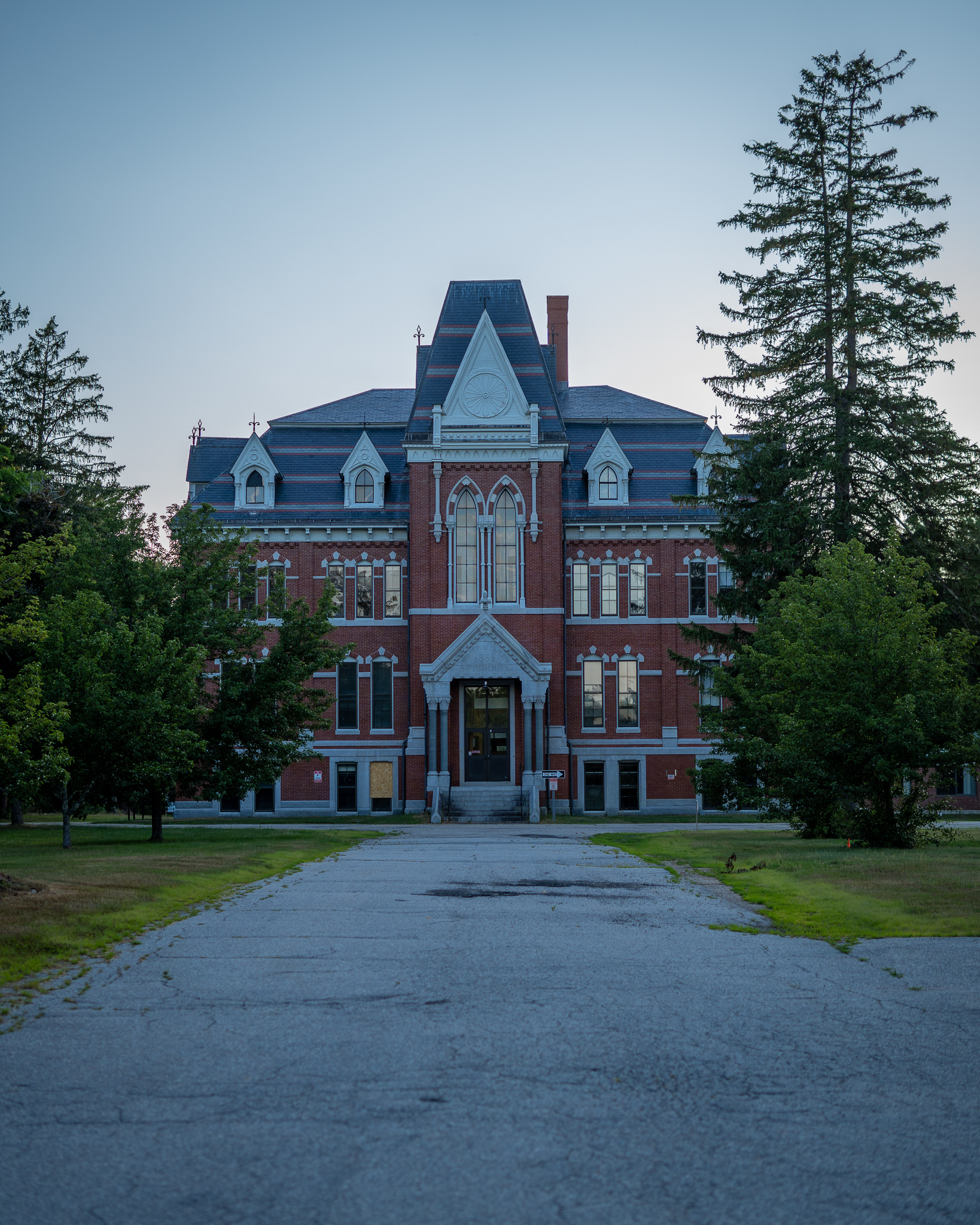

- Location within New Hampshire Location within the United States
- Location: 178 Main St., Kingston, New Hampshire
- Coordinates: 42°56′20″N 71°03′17″W
- Area: 3 acres (1.2 ha)
- Built: 1883
- Architect: Oliver L. Giddings
- Architectural style: Late Victorian
- NRHP reference No.: 84003233
- Added to NRHP: March 15, 1984

Sanborn Seminary is a historic educational facility in Kingston, New Hampshire. Its main building was built in 1883 by Major Edward S. Sanborn (died 1885) to serve as a secular secondary boarding school. The school ran continuously until 1966 when it was sold to the Town of Kingston. The campus became known as Sanborn Regional High School and served students from the towns of Kingston, Newton, and Fremont. The last class at this campus graduated in June 2006.

== Description and history ==
The former Sanborn Seminary is located north of the village center of Kingston, on the east side of Church Street north of Depot Road. It is a large four story masonry structure, built out of brick with limestone trim. It is covered by an elaborate multicolored slate mansard roof. The main facade is five bays wide, with the center bay projecting and rising to a three-story mansard roofed tower with iron cresting. The facade bays are otherwise articulated by brick pilasters, and have pairs of narrow windows, each with stone keystones, shoulders, and sills.

The Seminary building was designed in the Victorian Gothic style popular at the time of its construction, and was completed in 1883. The architect is unknown. In preparation for the building's 100th anniversary in 1983, an exterior restoration project was completed, and the building was placed on the National Register of Historic Places. The Seminary is the centerpiece of a campus complex that originally included five additional wood-frame structures and a beach recreation area on nearby Greenwood Pond. The bell tower was removed from the building's roof and located on the East Lawn until 2006, when it was relocated to the new Sanborn Regional High School atrium.

== Current use ==
A new building for Sanborn Regional High School opened on August 28, 2006. The Seminary building is currently empty. Various proposals have been made for its use, with town residents expressing a strong emotional tie to the facility. The other school facilities on the property are used for storage (the 'Science Building', to house the district's technology and business department (the old garage building), and the Swasey Gym, which is still used as the football locker room and for town and school basketball games.

== See also ==
- National Register of Historic Places listings in Rockingham County, New Hampshire

== Sources ==
- Nomination Form, National Register of Historic Places, National Park Service, United States Department of the Interior, 1984.
- "Old school hosts final graduation". The Portsmouth Herald. June 23, 2006.
- "Sanborn's dual life; The secrets which were revealed after his death", The New York Times, September 22, 1885, page 2.
- "Was Sanborn Sane? Dartmouth College contesting one of his wills", The New York Times, February 19, 1886, page 2.
- "Edward S. Sanborn's life; Efforts to break the will of an eccentric man. The dual life of the testator used as a means to prove insanity --testimony regarding his habits", The New York Times, January 2, 1886.
