= Lake Saltonstall (Massachusetts) =

- Plug Pond
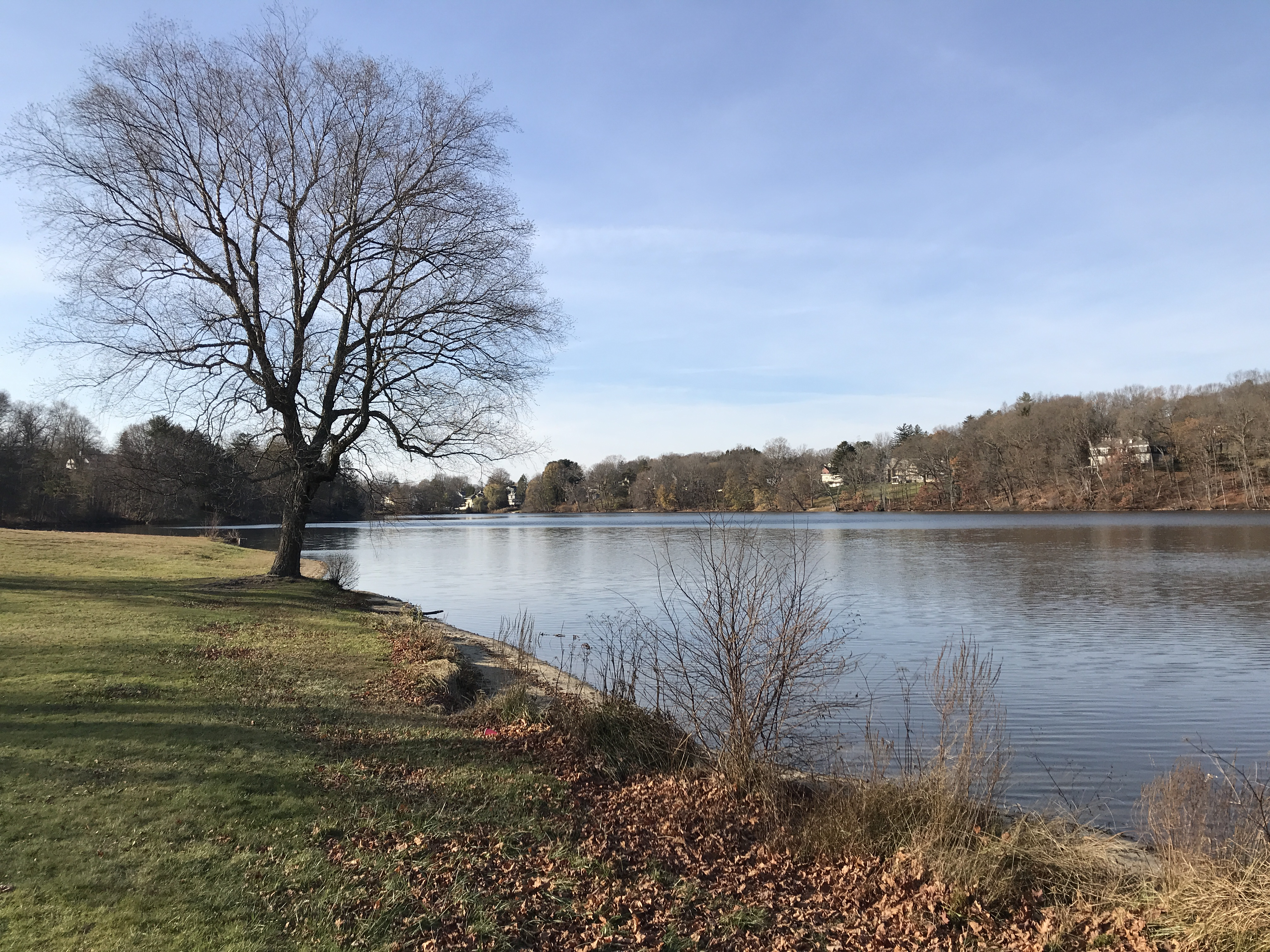
- Lake Saltonstall

- Location within Massachusetts Location within the United States
- Location: Essex County, Massachusetts, U.S.
- Coordinates: 42°46′59″N 71°03′56″W
- Type: Reservoir
- Basin countries: United States
- Surface elevation: 118 ft (36 m)
- Dam: Lake Saltonstall Outlet Dam
- Settlements: Haverhill

Lake Saltonstall, referred to locally as Plug Pond, is a small lake located in the southwest park of the Winnekenni Park Conservation Area, near Winnekenni Castle, in Haverhill, Massachusetts.

Accessible via the main entrance on Sanders Road or through trails leading from Winnikenni Castle, Lake Saltonstall has an area open to the public, and another reserved exclusively for Haverhill residents. During the summer months, it is open to residents for swimming, municipal boating programs, and picnicking with bathroom facilities. Residents and non-residents alike may fish on Lake Saltonstall as it is a state-stocked fishing area.
