= Bristol Downtown Historic District =

Historic district in Vermont, United States

- U.S. National Register of Historic Places
- U.S. Historic district
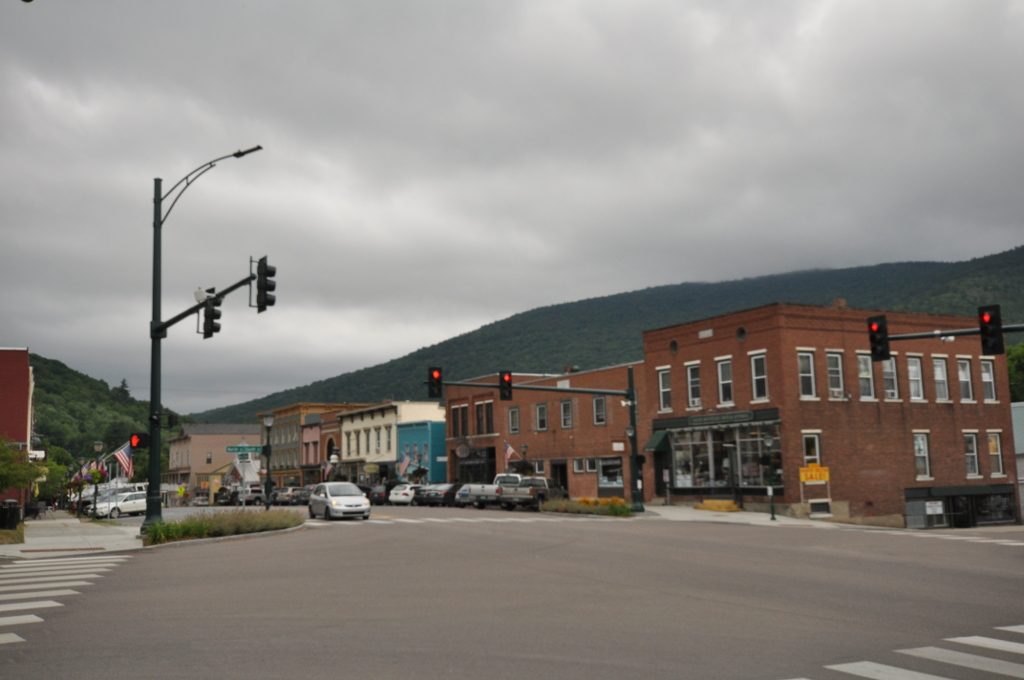

- Location within Vermont Location within the United States
- Location: Main St., Bristol, Vermont
- Coordinates: 44°7′57″N 73°4′40″W
- Area: 8 acres (3.2 ha)
- Architect: Daman, C.W.
- Architectural style: Italianate, Mixed (more Than 2 Styles From Different Periods)
- NRHP reference No.: 83003203
- Added to NRHP: February 3, 1983

The Bristol Downtown Historic District encompasses the historic late 19th-century commercial heart of Bristol, Vermont. At first a rural agricultural market town, it developed in the second half of the 19th century as a small industrial center, producing finished wood products. Its downtown occupies an area of one block on both sides of Main Street, and features a diversity of architectural styles. It was listed on the National Register of Historic Places in 1983.

== Description and history ==
The town of Bristol, Vermont, is located on the west side of Vermont's Green Mountains. It was settled in the 1780s, and was a basically agricultural community until the American Civil War. Its town center provided services to farmers in outlying areas, including a market for their goods and sawmills and gristmills for processing their lumber and grain. In 1862, a factory was established in the New Haven River just southwest of the town center, in which turned wood products were manufactured. Soon converted to manufacture coffins, the factory complex grew by the early 20th century to become one of the nation's leading suppliers of that product, along with a diversity of other wood products. These businesses declined after the First World War.

Downtown Bristol consists of one long block of Main Street (Vermont Route 116), which runs east-west north of the New Haven River. It runs east from a central four-way junction with North, South, and West Streets (the latter continuing VT 116), and includes Bristol's town hall, located at the southwest corner of the junction. East of this junction, both sides of Main Street are lined with more than a dozen late 19th and early 20th century commercial buildings. They are typically two or three stories in height, and built of brick. The north side of Main Street in this stretch is mainly taken up by the Union Block, a single building with seven storefronts. Behind the south side buildings is the 1924 Kilburn Mill, one of the town's last surviving factories of the historic period.

== See also ==
- National Register of Historic Places listings in Addison County, Vermont
