= Haverhill Board of Trade Building =

- U.S. National Register of Historic Places
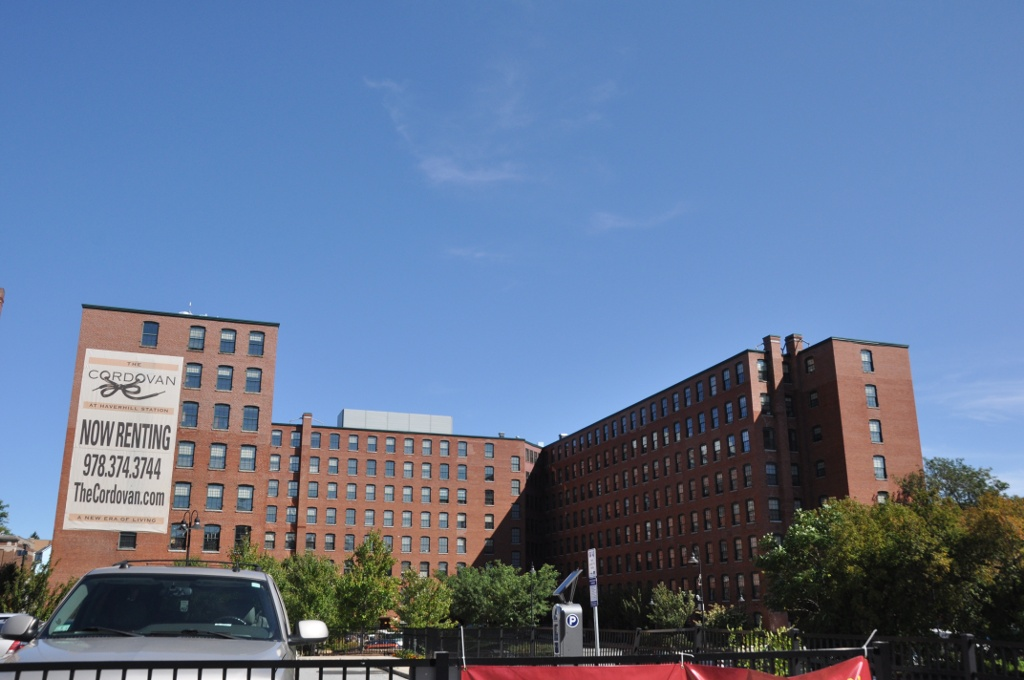

- Location within Massachusetts Location within the United States
- Location: Haverhill, Massachusetts
- Coordinates: 42°46′32″N 71°5′22″W
- Area: 1.3 acres (0.53 ha)
- Built: 1906
- Architect: Damon Brothers
- NRHP reference No.: 07001008
- Added to NRHP: September 28, 2007

The Haverhill Board of Trade Building is a historic factory building at 16-18 and 38-42 Walnut Street in Haverhill, Massachusetts. The seven-story brick building was built in stages between 1906 and 1908 by the Haverhill Board of Trade, a consortium of local businessmen. The purposes of the building was to provide affordable factory space to small business operators, principally in the shoe manufacturing business that dominated Haverhill's economy in the early 20th century. The building also marked an expansion of Haverhill's business and industrial district into a previously residential area. The building was listed on the National Register of Historic Places in 2007. It has been converted to residential use.

== Description and history ==
The Haverhill Board of Trade Building is set on the south side of Walnut Street, a short way north of Washington Street, Haverhill's main downtown thoroughfare. It occupies most of the block between Emerson and Locust Streets, abutting properties that front on them. It is a large U-shaped brick structure, with the open end of the U facing south, and an extended facade facing Walnut Street. This facade, 25 bays wide, also has the only significant architectural ornamentation. Its principal features are its two entrance bays, each located four bays in from the ends. Both have round-arch openings with brick piers and dentil courses around the arch. Although most of the building is red brick, the end bays are in a buff color, and there is a dentillated band of brickwork in buff between the second and third floors across the front.

The conception and construction of this building in 1906-08 represented a shift in the local approach to industrial development. Haverhill was by that time one of the nation's leading producers of footwear, and the city's economic leaders had formed a local Board of Trade in 1901 to stimulate economic activity. The stated objective in construction of this building was to provide facilities that would act as a business incubator, allowing small businesses to develop. It also marked a significant expansion of the city's industrial facilities away from Washington and Essex Streets, where they were then concentrated. After its construction (in which the three legs of the U were built separately, as land was acquired for them), the building rapidly filled up with relatively small shoe-manufacturing operations and companies that serviced them.

Competition in the shoe industry stiffened in the 1930s, and other industries began to move in. The Board of Trade sold the building's three parts to separate owners in 1944-45. Shoe-related businesses continued to occupy at least parts of the building until 1969. It eventually became the headquarters and principal show room of Cabot Furniture, which owned two of the three parcels until 2004. At that time all three parts of the building were reunited under single ownership. The building has since been converted into residential units.

== See also ==
- National Register of Historic Places listings in Essex County, Massachusetts
