= Greycourt State Park =

State park in Massachusetts, United States

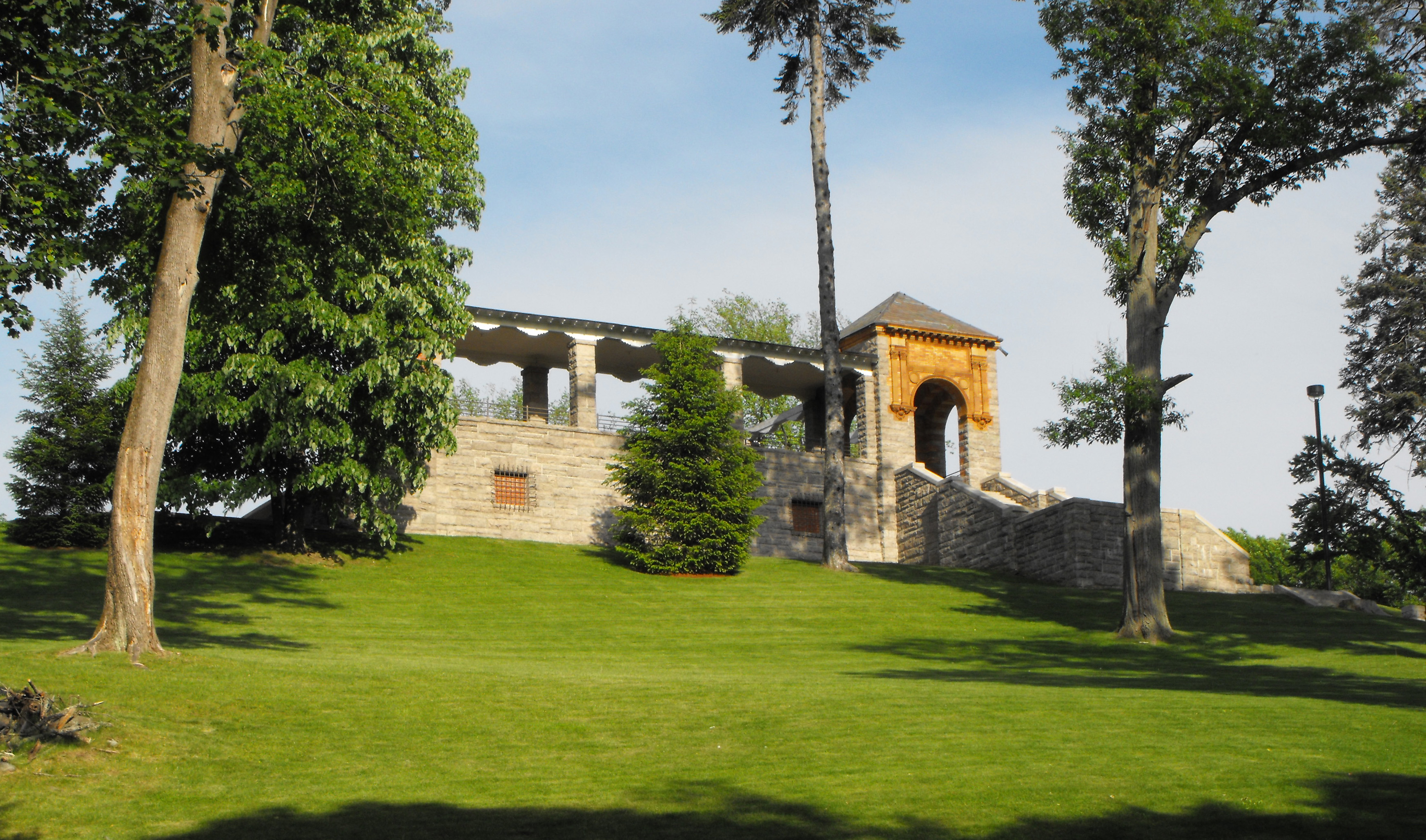
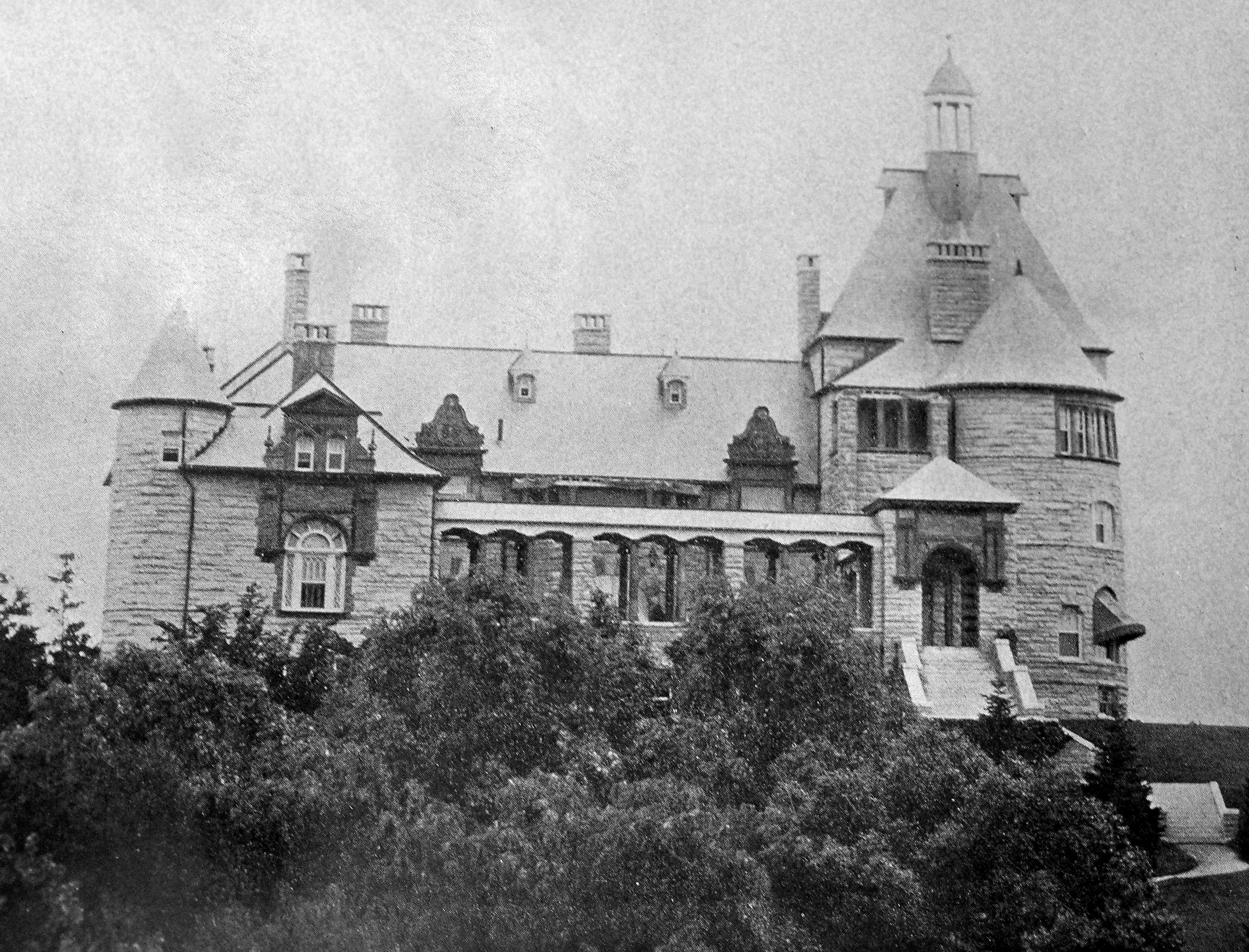
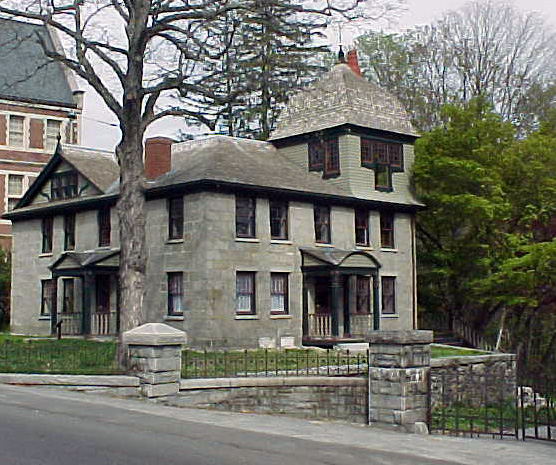
- Grey Court Tenney Gatehouse

- Location within Massachusetts Location within the United States
- Location: Methuen, Essex, Massachusetts, United States
- Coordinates: 42°43′46″N 71°10′51″W
- Area: 24 acres (9.7 ha)
- Established: 2001
- Governing body: City of Methuen; Massachusetts Department of Conservation and Recreation
- Website: Lawrence Heritage State Park

Greycourt State Park is a public recreation area covering 24 acres (9.7 ha) atop the partially restored ruins of the Charles H. Tenney estate in Methuen, Massachusetts. The state park is a satellite of Lawrence Heritage State Park managed by the Department of Conservation and Recreation and the City of Methuen.

== History ==
The construction of Grey Court, also known as the Tenney Castle, was begun in 1890 and completed in 1892. The mansion, which was modeled after the Château d'Yquem, stood on the hilltop until it was destroyed by fire in 1978. A small portion survived when the majority of the ruins were razed in 1985. The Tenney Castle Gatehouse, which is associated with the property, is listed on the National Register of Historic Places and is home to the Methuen Historical Society.

In 2001, the Massachusetts legislature approved $1,750,000 for the rehabilitation and repair of Greycourt State Park, including public safety improvements and courtyard renovations.

== Activities and amenities ==
The park offers wooded walking trails and scenic landscape from dawn to dusk and hosts city activities such as the annual Fall Festivals and other events.
