= Charles H. Tenney =

American businessman (1842–1919)

Charles Henry Tenney I
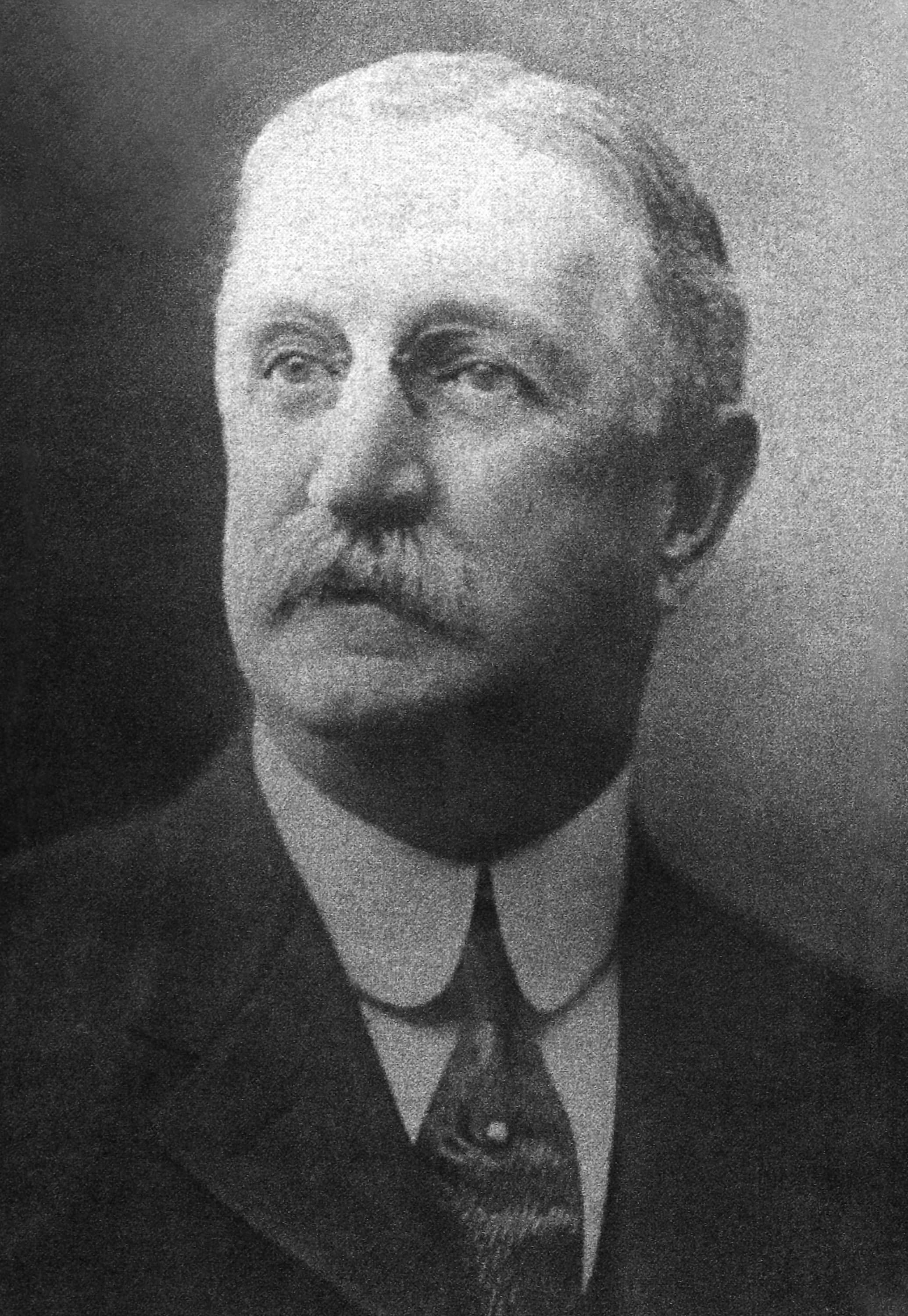
- Born: July 9, 1842; Salem, New Hampshire
- Died: April 27, 1919 (aged 76); New York, New York
- Occupations: Hat Manufacturer and Commissioned Merchant; Banker; Industrialist
- Spouse: Fannie Haseltine Gleason
- Children: 2

Charles Henry Tenney (July 9, 1842 – April 27, 1919) was the proprietor of C. H. Tenney & Co., established in 1868, and became one of the most successful commissioned merchant and hat dealers in the world. He was also a director of the Bank of the Manhattan Company and a life trustee of the Bowery Savings Bank.

== Biography ==
Born Charles Henry, in Salem, New Hampshire, he was the youngest of four sons of John Ferguson Tenney, a well-to-do farmer, and Hannah Woodbury. He married Fannie H. Gleason on November 23, 1865, and they had two children: a son, Daniel Gleason, and a daughter, Adelaide, who died as an infant. His grandson and namesake Charles Henry Tenney was from 1955–1964 Commissioner, Corporate Counsel, City Administrator and Deputy Mayor of New York City and nominated to the U.S. District Court for the Southern District of New York by President John F. Kennedy in 1963.

C. H. Tenney was educated at the New Hampshire Conference Seminary in Tilton. In his youth he helped tend his family farm and was a clerk in a general store. The family later moved to Methuen, Massachusetts, where his father opened a grocery and hardware store on Hampshire Street. His two older brothers, Daniel and George Washington, established Tenney & Co. shoe manufacturers and were Methuen civic leaders. Charles and his brother John Milton established the hat manufacturing enterprise, in which Charles sold his interest to J. Milton in 1883.

In 1868, C. H. Tenney opened offices in New York and established himself as a wholesale commission agent, handling a very large part of the hat production in the United States, and selling more than any similar concern in the world. He would live principally in New York and have offices headquartered at Washington Place and West 4th Street. His hat business was located at 610-618 Broadway, with more than 3 acres (12,000 m^{2}) of floor space. He was a member of the Union League Club of New York, the Metropolitan Club, New York Yacht Club, Sleepy Hollow Club, the New York Athletic Club, New York Chamber of Commerce and New England Society of New York. He was also a sustaining member of the Metropolitan Museum of Art and the Museum of Natural History.

Although his principal residence was at 570 Park Avenue, he died in his apartment at New York's Plaza Hotel. Memorial or funeral services honoring Tenney were held in New York City, Salem and Methuen. Interment, alongside his wife who died December 15, 1905, was in the Tenney Mausoleum at the Walnut Grove Cemetery in Methuen. The Tenney Memorial Chapel, designed by architect Grosvenor Atterbury, and located within the Walnut Grove Cemetery was dedicated (1927) by Daniel Gleason Tenney in memory of his parents. C. H. Tenney's estate was valued at more than $4.3 million, and he left $1 million to his son and $250,000 to each grandchild. He had always been a generous benefactor to Methuen. He dedicated the Hannah Tenney United Methodist Church in Salem Center to honor his mother. His will designated a quarter of a million dollars to a collection of churches, hospitals and schools in New Hampshire and Massachusetts.

== "City Father", Methuen, MA ==
Charles H. Tenney was one of the three "city fathers" who grew rich in the city of Methuen, Massachusetts, during the industrial boom of the late 19th century. His surname (as well as that of fellow "Methuen city fathers" Edward F. Searles and David C. Nevins, Sr.) appears in the titles of several sites in Methuen. This includes the "Searles Tenney Nevins Historic District" established by the City of Methuen in 1992 to preserve the "distinctive architecture and rich character of one of Massachusetts' most unique neighborhoods".

The trio's collective vision and architectural rivalry can still be seen in the industrial and civic buildings, as well as churches, mansions and monuments. The historic district boundaries were established to include properties and buildings constructed or used by the Searles, Tenney and Nevins families and the people who worked for them.

On July 24, 1888, the benefactor unveiled a Civil War Soldiers and Sailors Memorial on Charles Street in Methuen, created by sculptor Thomas Ball and honoring, among others, those who had served in the Sixth Massachusetts Volunteer Infantry.

== Grey Court ==
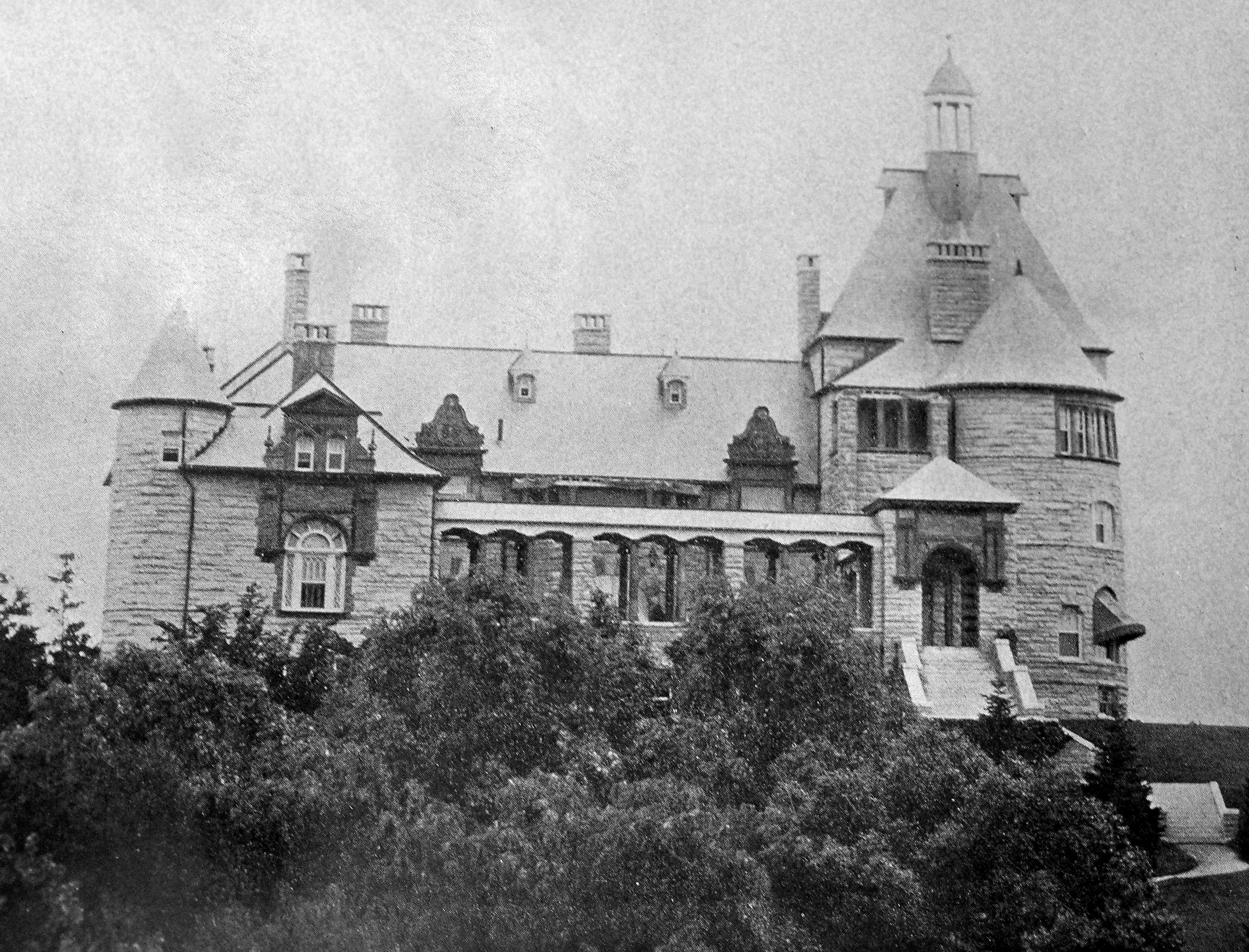

Grey Court (aka Tenney Castle) designed by Carrère and Hastings, prominent New York architects, was the centerpiece of Charles Tenney's 75-acre (300,000 m^{2}) rolling estate Fair View Park. Begun in 1890 and completed two years later, the mansion was modeled after Château d'Yquem, the ancestral seat of Montaigne, and served as the Tenney family's summer home. Ernest W. Bowditch designed the grounds. He had laid out several estates in Newport, Rhode Island, including Marble House, W. K. Vanderbilt's estate; designed Tuxedo Park in New York; and landscaped Colgate University. His designs for Greycourt's surrounds won a prestigious horticultural prize in 1902. The remains are now a Massachusetts state park.

From New England families, genealogical and memorial a record of the achievements of her people in the making of commonwealths and the founding of a nation, by William Richard Cutter (1913):

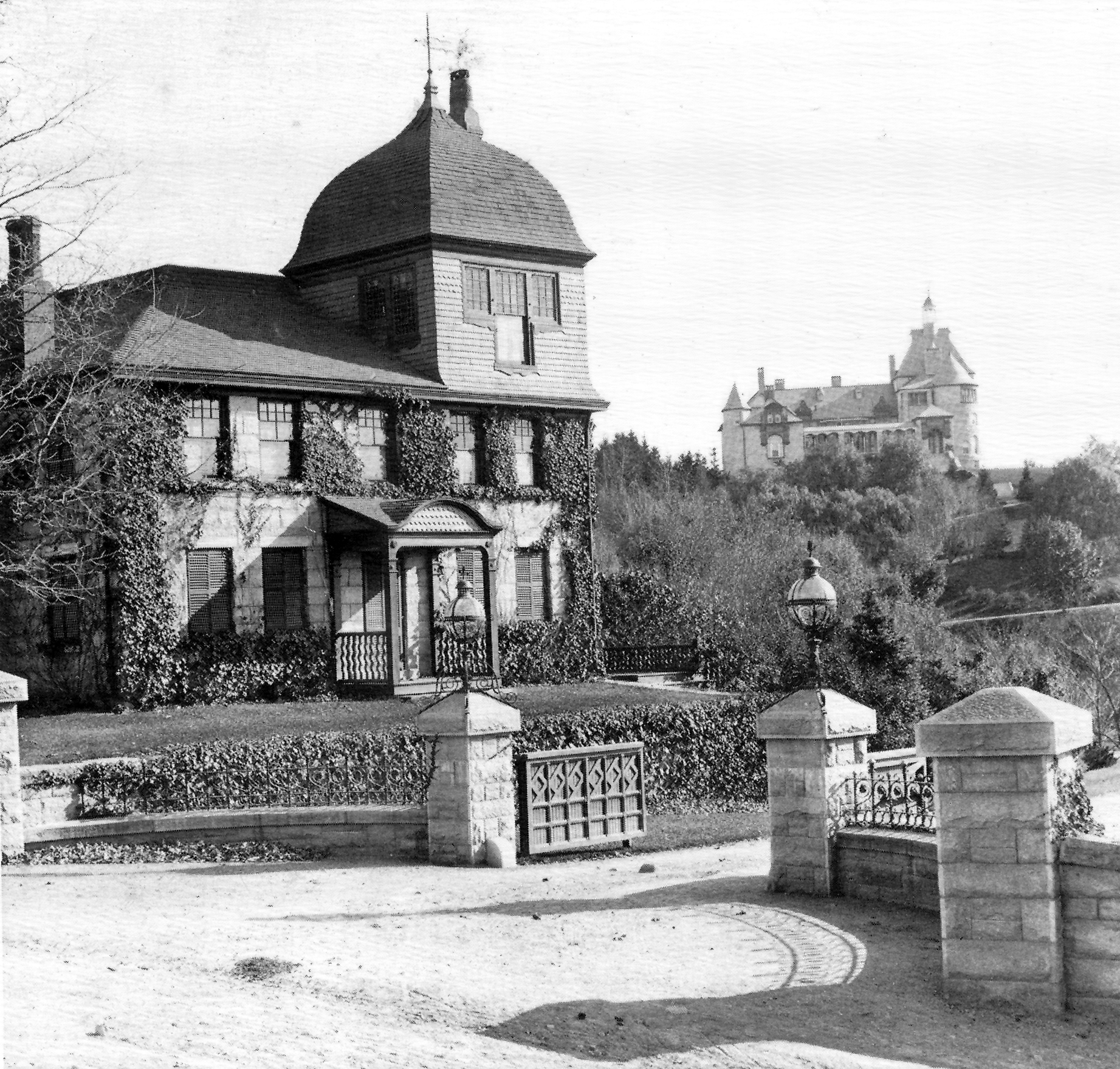
Charles Tenney Estate

The town of Methuen, Massachusetts, where he makes his home in summer, has been largely benefited by his generosity. This picturesque little town has been greatly beautified by Mr. Tenney. His magnificent estate, laid out by modern landscape artists, is a beautiful park in itself and is always open to the public. The mansion, modeled after the Chateau Yquem, the ancestral seat of the great Montaigne, crowns a sightly hill, and is approached by a winding driveway, a mile long. Southwest of the mansion is an unenclosed quadrangle in the Italian style, two sides of which form an open corridor, its roof supported upon pillars of richly colored marble. The view from the hill overlooking the city of Lawrence and the Andovers is superb.

== Tenney Gatehouse ==
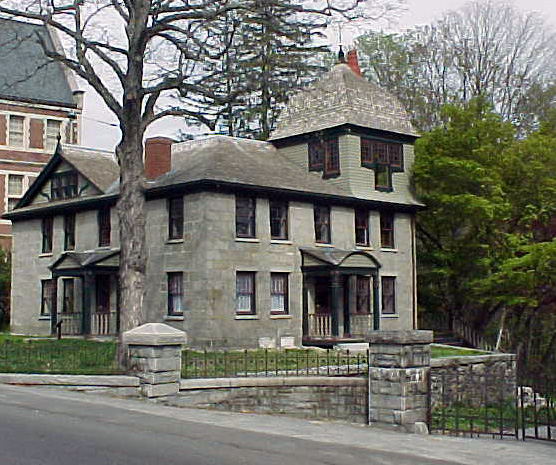
Tenney Gatehouse 2005

Now home to the Methuen Historical Society and listed on the National Register of Historic Places, the Tenney Gatehouse (aka Tenney Gate House) was originally a rough stone farmhouse built by Richard Whittier in 1830. Tenney purchased it in 1882 and remodeled to become the entry point to Greycourt. Today it is one of the few remaining structures on the estate.

In 1951, the Tenney family gave 26 acres (110,000 m^{2}) to the town for Tenney High School (now Tenney Grammar School) and sold the rest to the Basilian Salvatorian Order. From 1977-1978 a series of fires eventually destroyed the mansion. The Gatehouse and the Stock House or Stables are all that remain standing.

== Other sources ==
- King, Moses. Notable New Yorker of 1896-1899: a companion volume to King’s handbook of New York City (1899), Page 510. M. King, New York, NY. accessed 2010.07.09
- Tenney, Jonathan and Tenney, M.J. The Tenney Family or the Descendants of Thomas Tenney, of Rowley, Mass, 1638-1890. Rumford Press, 1904. accessed 2010.07.09
- New York Times. "Mr. C.H. Tenney's Friends See Him Off." Page 16. June 23, 1889. accessed 2010.07.10
- Tenney, Charles Henry, "Dedication exercises of the Soldier's and Sailor's Monument: presented to Methuen, Mass" (Methuen, Mass, Fred A. Lowell & Co., printers, 1888).
