= Kingston, New Hampshire =

Town in New Hampshire, United States

- Town
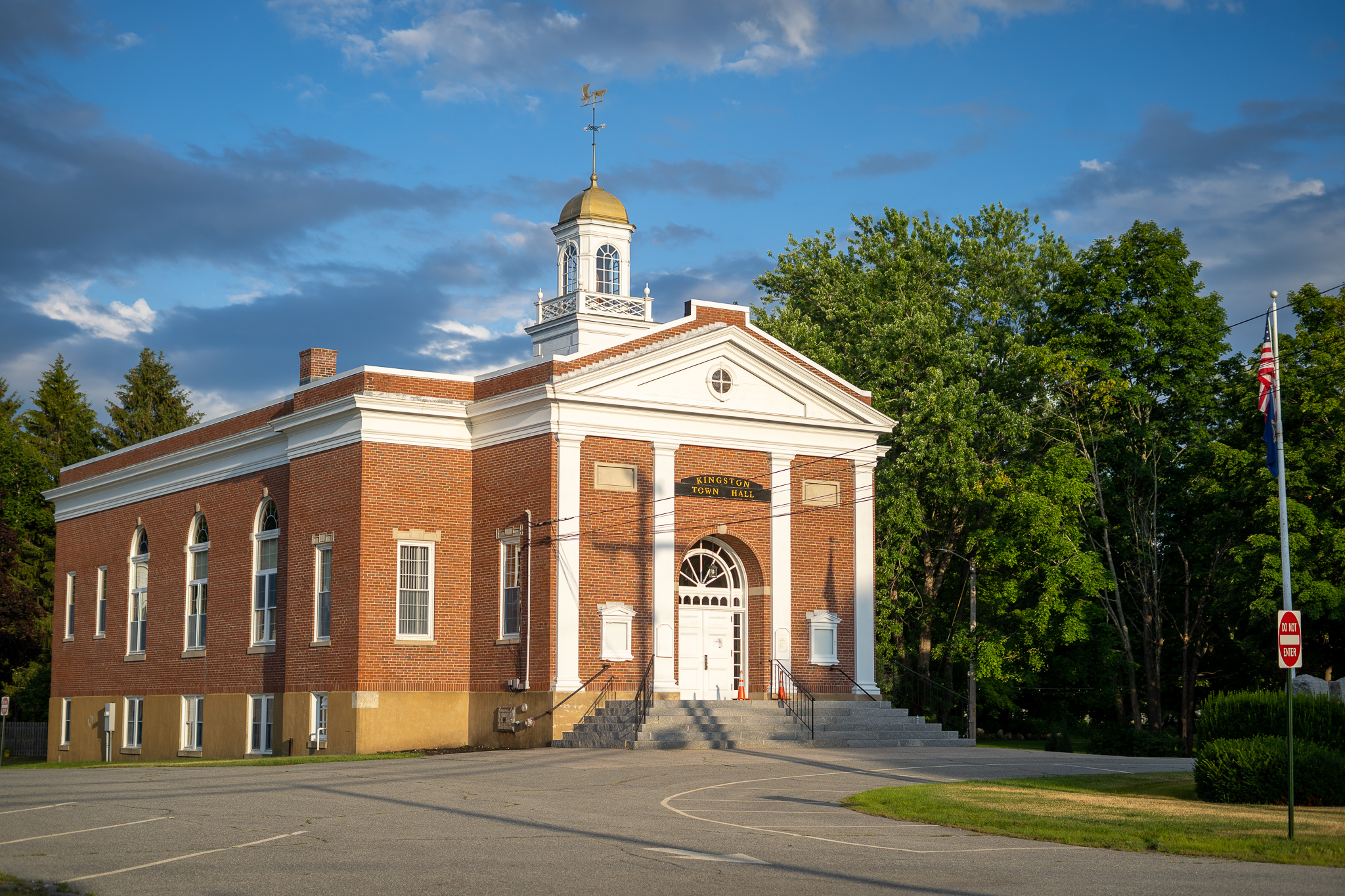
- Town Hall

- Seal

- Location in Rockingham County and the state of New Hampshire.
- Coordinates: 42°54′56″N 71°03′59″W
- Country: United States
- State: New Hampshire
- County: Rockingham
- Incorporated: 1694
- Villages: Kingston; West Kingston

Area
  - Total: 21.0 sq mi (54.5 km^{2})
  - Land: 19.8 sq mi (51.3 km^{2})
  - Water: 1.2 sq mi (3.2 km^{2}) 5.90%
- Elevation: 138 ft (42 m)

Population (2020)
  - Total: 6,202
  - Density: 310/sq mi (121/km^{2})
- Time zone: UTC-5 (Eastern)
  - Summer (DST): UTC-4 (Eastern)
- ZIP code: 03848
- Area code: 603
- FIPS code: 33-015-40100
- GNIS feature ID: 873638
- Website: www.kingstonnh.gov

Kingston is a town in Rockingham County, New Hampshire, United States. The population at the 2020 census was 6,202.

== History ==
Kingston was the fifth town to be established in New Hampshire. Originally, it was a part of Hampton. After King Philip's War, the establishment of new settlements was made possible by peace treaties with the local Indian tribes and, in 1692, by geographical and jurisdictional agreements between the provinces of Massachusetts Bay and New Hampshire. Consequently, certain residents of Hampton petitioned for a grant of a separate township to be created from the western part of Hampton. And so, in 1694, King William III of England granted a royal charter establishing the town of "Kingstown", so named in honor of the King. Use of the title rather than the King's name was common at the time. The original charter exists to this day.

=== Historic district ===
The Kingston historic district encompasses the town center of Kingston. Historic buildings and sites within the district include the Kingston town hall; the Josiah Bartlett House, home of the second signer of the U.S. Declaration of Independence; the First Universalist Church; the Sanborn Seminary; the Nichols Memorial Research Library; the Kingston Historical Museum (housed in the town's first fire house); The 1686 House restaurant; the Masonic building; the Cemetery at the Plains (where Josiah Bartlett is buried); the Church on the Plains; and the Grace Daley House and barn, home to the town's first church-owned parsonage (1835).

=== West Kingston ===
West Kingston is located along the road to Danville, in the western section of town, southwest of Great Pond. Evidence of the early inhabitants was manifested by the construction of a log garrison house on the present Great Pond Road. This well-built house consisted of two large rooms downstairs and a huge open chamber on the second floor. In later years a small ell was attached to the north side. The historic house was demolished at the beginning of the 20th century. The stone step at the main entrance and what must have been the "cellar hole" of this dwelling are still visible.

In the midst of an agrarian society, the charcoal manufacturing industry took root and became a major business in West Kingston. Charcoal was carried by horse-drawn wagons to the Massachusetts cities of Haverhill, Lawrence, North Andover, Newburyport, Lowell, and Amesbury, as well as to Exeter, New Hampshire. Some was sold by street peddlers to be used in homes for the purpose of kindling fires. A great deal was also used by the large machine shops and by the silversmiths.

Many individuals manufactured shoes in their small, one-room shoe shops. Such a shop stood until recently near the Thomas Page residence. Some people sewed shoes in their own homes. Unlike the large-scale factories of today, concerned with mass production, these enterprises constructed the whole shoe, hand-sewing it with an artisan's touch.

A cooper shop on the Wadleigh Farm produced barrels made entirely of wood: the staves were made of pine and hardwoods, and were bound with hoops of birch. Skilled workers made hooks to hold hoops together. When a sufficient number of barrels was collected, the men hauled them to Newburyport to be sold - probably to be used by fishermen in packing fish.

== Geography ==
According to the United States Census Bureau, Kingston has a total area of 21.0 square miles (54.5 km^{2}), of which 19.8 square miles (51.3 km^{2}) are land and 1.2 square miles (3.2 km^{2}) are water, comprising 5.90% of the town. The highest point in Kingston is the east summit of Rock Rimmon Hill, at about 350 feet (110 m) above sea level, on the town's border with Danville to the west. The majority of the town is drained by the Powwow River, a tributary of the Merrimack. The northern portion of town is drained by the Little River, part of the Exeter River/Piscataqua River watershed.

=== Adjacent municipalities ===
- Brentwood (north)
- Exeter (northeast)
- East Kingston (east)
- Newton (south)
- Plaistow (southwest)
- Hampstead (southwest)
- Danville (west)
- Fremont (northwest)

== Points of interest ==
=== Listed on the U.S. National Register of Historic Places ===
- First Universalist Church, built in 1879 and in use as a church until 1954
- Josiah Bartlett House, built in 1774 (not open to the public)
- Nichols Memorial Library, built in 1898 and now a research library
- Plains Cemetery, burial site of Josiah Bartlett and some Civil War veterans
- Sanborn Seminary, built in 1883 and in use until 2006

=== Other sites ===
- Grace Daley House and barn, at risk of being demolished
- Rock Rimmon Hill
- Kingston Historical Museum, open to the public during Kingston Days, other special events, and by appointment
- Kingston State Park
- Lone Tree Scout Reservation

== Kingston Days celebration ==
The Kingston Days celebration occurs on the first Friday, Saturday and Sunday of August. It is to celebrate the town's incorporation date of August 6, 1694. The celebration offers live music and activities, family fun and a large flea market, car show, and motorcycle show. It also includes various events such as a karate show and a police dog demonstration. During this event the Kingston Historical Museum complex is open to the public, in conjunction with the Nichols Memorial Research Library.

== Education ==
Kingston is part of the Sanborn Regional School District (SAU 17), providing public education to students who live in Kingston, Fremont, and Newton.

Schools in Kingston are:

- Sanborn Regional High School (grades 9–12)
- Middle school students (grades 6–8) attend Sanborn Regional High School in Kingston.
- D.J. Bakie Elementary School (grades Pre-K, K, 1–2)
- Memorial School (3-5) attend Memorial School at Newton

Pre-schools include:

- Kingston Children's Center (grades Pre-K, K)
- Story Book Station (grades Pre-K, K, 1)

== Demographics ==
Historical population
Census	Pop.	Note	%±
1790	906		—
1800	785		−13.4%
1810	746		−5.0%
1820	847		13.5%
1830	929		9.7%
1840	1,032		11.1%
1850	1,192		15.5%
1860	1,216		2.0%
1870	1,054		−13.3%
1880	1,080		2.5%
1890	1,120		3.7%
1900	1,132		1.1%
1910	1,015		−10.3%
1920	859		−15.4%
1930	1,017		18.4%
1940	1,002		−1.5%
1950	1,283		28.0%
1960	1,672		30.3%
1970	2,882		72.4%
1980	4,111		42.6%
1990	5,591		36.0%
2000	5,862		4.8%
2010	6,025		2.8%
2020	6,202		2.9%
U.S. Decennial Census

As of the census of 2010, there were 6,025 people, 2,288 households, and 1,704 families residing in the town. The population density was 305.8 inhabitants per square mile (118.1/km^{2}). There were 2,480 housing units, of which 192, or 7.7%, were vacant at the time of the census. The racial makeup of the town was 97.0% White, 0.3% African American, 0.3% Native American, 0.4% Asian, 0.1% Pacific Islander, 0.3% some other race, and 1.5% from two or more races. Hispanic or Latino of any race were 1.4% of the population.

Of the 2,288 households, 31.3% had children under the age of 18 living with them, 60.3% were headed by married couples living together, 9.4% had a female householder with no husband present, and 25.5% were non-families. 19.6% of all households were made up of individuals, and 8.4% were someone living alone who was 65 years of age or older. The average household size was 2.63, and the average family size was 3.01.

21.2% of the town population were under the age of 18, 7.4% were from age 18 to 24, 23.6% were from 25 to 44, 35.1% were from 45 to 64, and 12.7% were 65 years of age or older. The median age was 43.7 years. For every 100 females, there were 96.9 males. For every 100 females age 18 and over, there were 96.0 males.

For the period 2013–2017, the estimated median annual income for a household in the town was $93,096, and the median income for a family was $101,471. Male full-time workers had a median income of $59,657 versus $54,805 for females. The per capita income for the town was $46,706. About 2.7% of families and 4.9% of the population were below the poverty line, including 4.9% of those under age 18 and 9.6% of those age 65 or over.

== Notable people ==
- Josiah Bartlett (1729–1795), Founding Father, second signer of the Declaration of Independence
- Luella J. B. Case (1807–1857), author, hymn writer
- Adam Lanza (1992–2012), perpetrator of the Sandy Hook Elementary School shooting
- Henry F. C. Nichols (1833–1890), member of the Wisconsin State Assembly
