= Bartlett (surname) =

Bartlett is a surname. Notable people with the name include:

== Disambiguation of common given names with this surname ==
- Charles Bartlett (disambiguation), several people
- Edward Bartlett (disambiguation), several people
- Jason Bartlett (disambiguation), several people
- John Bartlett (disambiguation), several people
- Kevin Bartlett (disambiguation), several people
- Mary Bartlett (disambiguation), several people
- Neil Bartlett (disambiguation), several people
- Paul Bartlett (disambiguation), several people
- Thomas Bartlett (disambiguation), several people
- William Bartlett (disambiguation), several people

== Arts and letters ==
- Alicia Giménez Bartlett (born 1951) Spanish writer
- Amanda Bartlett Harris (1824–1917), American author and literary critic
- Annie Latham Bartlett (1865–1948), American sculptor
- Basil Bartlett (1905–1985), British screenwriter
- Ben Bartlett (1965–2026), British composer
- Bonnie Bartlett (born 1929), American television and film actor
- Charles W. Bartlett (1860–1940), English painter
- Craig Bartlett (born 1956), American animator
- Ellis Ashmead-Bartlett (1881–1931), British war correspondent during World War I
- Erinn Bartlett (born 1973), American actor
- Ethel Bartlett (1896–1978), British pianist, see Bartlett and Robertson
- Eugene Monroe Bartlett (1885–1941), American singer, songwriter and music producer
- Frederic Clay Bartlett (1873–1953), American artist and art collector
- Gray Bartlett (born 1942), New Zealand guitarist
- Hetta Bartlett (1877–1947), English stage and film actress
- Ichabod S. Bartlett (1838–1925), American historian, businessperson, and politician
- Jennifer Bartlett (1941–2022), American artist
- Martine Bartlett (1925–2006), American actress
- Mike Bartlett (playwright) (born 1980), English playwright and theatre director
- Murray Bartlett (born 1971), Australian actor
- Paul Wayland Bartlett (1865–1925), American sculptor
- Peter Bartlett (actor) (born 1942), American actor
- Rob Bartlett (born 1957), American comedian and actor
- Robin Bartlett (born 1951), American actress
- Ron Bartlett, American sound mixer
- Sy Bartlett (1900–1977), American author and screenwriter
- Taurus Bartlett (born 1999), American rapper and singer known professionally as Polo G
- Vernon Bartlett (1894–1983), English journalist and politician

== Politics and government ==
- Andrew Bartlett (born 1964), senator in the Australian Parliament
- Ann Bartlett (1920–2013), American politician
- Bailey Bartlett (1750–1830), U.S. Representative from Massachusetts
- Betty Bartlett-Ambatielos (1917–2011), Anglo-Greek communist activist
- Bob Bartlett (1904–1968), U.S. Senator from Alaska
- Charles Lafayette Bartlett (1853–1938), U.S. Representative from Georgia
- Charles W. Bartlett (lawyer) (1845–1916), American lawyer and politician
- Christy Bartlett, American politician
- Dan Bartlett (born 1971), Counselor to the President in the George W. Bush administration
- David Bartlett (born 1968), premier of Tasmania, Australia
- Dewey F. Bartlett (1919–1979), Oklahoma politician
- Dewey F. Bartlett Jr. (born 1947), Oklahoma politician
- Eben Bartlett (1912–1983), New Hampshire state representative
- Ellis Ashmead-Bartlett (politician) (1849–1902), American-born British Conservative politician
- Harry Bartlett (Australian politician) (1835–1915), South Australian parliamentarian
- Joseph J. Bartlett (1834–1893), American Civil War general and diplomat
- Joseph R. Bartlett (born 1969), Maryland politician
- Josiah Bartlett (1729–1795), 6th New Hampshire governor
- Kerry Bartlett (born 1949), Australian politician
- Louis Bartlett (1873–1951), American attorney and mayor
- Manuel Bartlett (born 1936), Mexican politician
- Patricia Bartlett (1928–2000), New Zealand Catholic activist
- Ranae Bartlett, American politician
- Roscoe Bartlett (born 1926), Maryland politician
- Sidney Bartlett (1799–1889), American lawyer and politician
- Steve Bartlett (born 1947), former U.S. congressman and mayor of Dallas, Texas
- Washington Bartlett (1824–1887), mayor of San Francisco

== Sciences ==
- Abraham Dee Bartlett (1812–1897), British zoologist
- Albert Allen Bartlett (1923–2013), American professor of physics
- Albert Charles Bartlett, British electronics engineer
- Cheryl Bartlett, Canadian biologist
- Francis A. Bartlett (1882–1963), American arborist
- Frederic Bartlett (1886–1969), British psychologist
- Harley Harris Bartlett (1886–1960), American botanist
- Katharine Bartlett (1907–2001), American physical anthropologist
- M. S. Bartlett (1910–2002), British statistician
- Paul Doughty Bartlett (1907–1997), American chemist
- Robin L. Bartlett, American economist
- Rodney J. Bartlett (born 1944), American professor of chemistry and physics

== Sports ==
- Adam Bartlett (born 1986), English footballer
- Don Bartlett (born 1960), Canadian curler
- Earl Bartlett (1908–1987), American football player
- Fred Bartlett (1913–1968), English footballer
- Gary Bartlett (born 1941), New Zealand cricketer
- Hugh Bartlett (1914–1988), English cricketer
- Jared Bartlett (born 2001), American football player
- Megan Bartlett (born 1983), American softball coach
- Mike Bartlett (ice hockey) (born 1985), American ice hockey player
- Nicholas Bartlett (born 1979), Australian kendo player
- Shaun Bartlett (born 1972), South African footballer

== Other ==
- Bruce Bartlett (born 1951), American historian
- Dana W. Bartlett (1860–1942), American Congregationalist minister
- Kristine Bartlett, equal pay campaigner from New Zealand
- Polly Bartlett, American serial killer perhaps fictitious
- Robert Bartlett (explorer) (1875–1946), Newfoundland captain and Arctic explorer
- Robert Bartlett (historian) (born 1950), British historian and medievalist
- Rosamund Bartlett, British scholar of Russian literature
- Samuel Colcord Bartlett (1817–1898), president of Dartmouth College
- Samuel Slater Bartlett (1899–1969), founder and first headmaster of South Kent School
- Taurus Tremani Bartlett (born 1999), American rapper
- Willard Bartlett (1848–1925), Chief Judge of the New York Court of Appeals

== Given name ==
- Bartlett Marshall Low (1839–1893), American businessman and politician
- Bartlett Sher (born 1959), American theatre director
- Bartlett Robinson (1912–1986), American actor

== Middle name ==
- James Bartlett Hammond (1839–1913), American inventor
- William Bartlett Dalby (1840–1918), British surgeon
- William Bartlett Fletcher Sr. (1862–1957), Rear Admiral in the United States Navy

== See also ==
- Bartlet
