= John Bartlett =

John Bartlett may refer to:

== Politics ==
- John Bartlett (Australian politician) (1949–2008), New South Wales politician
- John Bartlett (Connecticut politician) (1677–1761), member of the Connecticut House of Representatives from Norwalk
- John Bartlett (Indiana politician), Democratic politician
- John Bartlett (Newfoundland politician) (c. 1841–1925), ship's captain and politician in Newfoundland
- John H. Bartlett (1869–1952), governor of New Hampshire
- John Russell Bartlett (1805–1886), librarian and Rhode Island politician

== Sportspeople ==
- John Bartlett (cricketer) (1928–2014), English former cricketer
- John Bartlett (tennis) (born 1948), pro-Australian tennis player from the early 1970s
- John W. Bartlett (c. 1877–?), football manager
- John Bartlett (rugby union) (1907–1967), Welsh international rugby union player
- John Bartlett (racing driver)
- John Bartlett (sportscaster), Canadian sportscaster

== Other ==
- John Barthlet or Bartlett (fl. 1566), English theological writer
- John Bartlett (botanist) (1945–1986), New Zealand plant collector and botanist
- John Bartlett (minister) (1784–1849), minister, founder of Massachusetts General Hospital
- John Bartlett (publisher) (1820–1905), publisher of Bartlett's Familiar Quotations
- John G. Bartlett (1937–2021), American physician and medical researcher
- John Knowlton Bartlett (1816–1889), Vice President of the American Medical Association
- John Russell Bartlett (naval officer) (1843–1904), American naval officer, admiral, and oceanographer
- John Vernon Bartlett (1927–2021), British civil engineer

== See also ==
- John Bartlett Angel (1913–1993), Canadian educator, businessman and volunteer
- John Bartlet (composer), English composer
- John Bartlet (divine), English nonconformist divine
