= Bartlet =

Bartlet is a surname. Notable people with this surname include:

- Elizabeth Bartlet (musicologist) (1948–2005), Canadian musicologist
- George Bartlet (1866–1951), Scottish clergyman, dean of Aberdeen and Orkney
- John Bartlet (composer) (fl. 1606–1610), English composer
- John Bartlet (divine) (fl. 1662), English Anglican nonconformist divine
- Josiah Bartlet, fictional US president in the TV series West Wing
- William Bartlet (died 1682), English minister

== See also ==
- Bartlett (surname)
