= William Bartlett =

William Bartlett may refer to:

- William B. Bartlett (1830–1911), Wisconsin state assemblyman
- William Bartlett (footballer) (1878–1939), English footballer who played for Huddersfield Town
- William Bartlett (discus thrower) (1896–1946), American discus thrower
- William Francis Bartlett (1840–1876), Union major general during the American Civil War
- William Henry Bartlett (1809–1854), British artist
- William H. C. Bartlett (1804–1893), American military engineer and educator
- William P. Bartlett (1829–1917), Wisconsin state assemblyman
- William Chauncey Bartlett (1818–1907), American writer
- William S. Bartlett Jr., president of the New Hampshire Senate, 1987–1990
- Bill Bartlett (musician), member of the 1960s band the Lemon Pipers and 1970s band Ram Jam
- Bill Bartlett (footballer) (1915–1967), Australian rules footballer

== See also ==
- William Bartlet (died 1682), religious minister
- William Bartlit (1793–1871), New York politician
- William Bartlett Dalby (1840–1918), British aural surgeon and otologist
- William Bartlett Fletcher Sr. (1862–1957), rear admiral in the United States Navy
