= John Bartlet =

John Bartlet may refer to:

- John Bartlet (composer), English Renaissance composer
- John Bartlet (divine), English nonconformist divine

== See also ==
- John Bartlett (disambiguation)
