= Ichabod (disambiguation) =

Ichabod is a Biblical figure and (Hebrew: אִי כָבוֹד) a Hebrew word meaning "the glory has departed."

It may also refer to:

== People ==
- Ichabod Alden (1739–1778), American Revolutionary War officer
- Ichabod Bartlett (1786–1853), United States Representative from New Hampshire
- Ichabod S. Bartlett (1838–1925), American soldier, journalist, miner, writer, and politician
- Ichabod Crane (colonel) (1787–1857), American military officer
- Ichabod Dimock (died 1858), Nova Scotia farmer, magistrate and politician
- Ichabod Goodwin (1794–1882), 27th governor of New Hampshire
- Ichabod Spencer (1798–1854), American Presbyterian preacher and author
- Ichabod Washburn (1798–1868), American industrialist
- Ichabod T. Williams (1826–1899), American businessman and art collector
- Ichabod Wiswall (1637–1700), third pastor of the church in Duxbury, Plymouth Colony
- Ichabod Charles Wright (1795–1871), English scholar, translator, poet and accountant
- Ichabod, a Walt Whitman pen name

=== Fictional characters ===
- Ichabod Crane, a character in Washington Irving's short story "The Legend of Sleepy Hollow"

== Sports ==
- Washburn Ichabods, the sports teams of Washburn University
  - The Ichabod, mascot of Washburn University, named after Ichabod Washburn

== Places ==
- Ichabod Range, a mountain range in Nevada
