= Ralph Friedman =

American author

- Born: 3 June 1916
- Died: 3 June 1995 (aged 79)
- Occupation: Author
- Spouse: Phoebe Friedman
- Writing career
- Genres: Travel guides and local histories
- Subject: Oregon
- Notable work: Oregon for the Curious

Ralph Friedman (June 3, 1916 – June 3, 1995) was an American author, best known for his books about Oregon, which included travel guides and popular histories.

Born and raised to an impoverished Lithuanian Jewish immigrant family in Chicago, Friedman began riding the rails as a hobo during the Great Depression, and first arrived in Oregon as a hitchhiker in 1933. While working on and off in canneries and as a merchant seaman, he took courses at six different colleges and universities. Friedman was involved in labor and anti-war causes, and he met his wife, the broadcaster and political activist Phoebe Friedman, on a picket line in front of the White House in 1948. In 1950, the couple moved to Portland permanently.

During his career, Friedman wrote ten books and contributed to many other books, magazines, and newspapers. He led a travel class called "Oregon for the Curious" for Portland Community College (PCC), and also taught writing and folklore at PCC and at Portland State University.

Friedman's highway guides, such as Oregon for the Curious (1966) catalogue obscure, off-the-beaten-path parts of the state and are often illustrated with historical anecdotes, spurts of creative purple prose, and criticism of commercial overdevelopment and environmental degradation. His books were bestsellers and remain a staple of used bookstores in Oregon. Regional writer Matt Love believes that they may have helped inspire the environmentalist reforms promulgated during Tom McCall's gubernatorial administration.

Friedman died in Portland, Oregon on June 3, 1995, his 79th birthday.

== Works ==
- The Other Side of Oregon (1992) ISBN 0-87004-352-8
- In Search of Western Oregon (1991) ISBN 0-87004-332-3
- This Side of Oregon (1982) ISBN 0-87004-284-X
- Tracking Down Oregon (1978) ISBN 0-87004-257-2
- A Touch of Oregon – Love Song to a State (1976) ISBN 0-89174-005-8
- Tales Out of Oregon (1976) ISBN 0-89174-004-X
- Oregon for the Curious (First Edition, 1965; Second Edition, 1966; Third Edition, 1972) ISBN 0-87004-222-X
- Northwest Passages: A Book of Travel (1968) ASIN B0006CY1RA
- "West's Wildest Cattle Drive" (Real West, March 1965, p. 23)
- "A Bible for Snowshoe" (Real West, January 1961, p. 37)
- "Legend of the Amazing Pete French" (Real West, May 1962, p. 43)
- "Murdering Scourge of Snake River" (Real West, January 1963, p. 11)
- "Home on the Range" (Frontier Times, March 1963, p. 28)
