= Charles Henry Bartlett =

Charles Henry Bartlett may refer to:

- Charles H. Bartlett (1833–1900), American lawyer and politician in New Hampshire
- Charles Henry Bartlett (cyclist) (1885–1968), British track cyclist
- Charles Bartlett (American football) (1899–1965), college football player

== See also ==
- Charles Bartlett (disambiguation)
