= William Snyder =

William or Bill Snyder may refer to:

- William Snyder (photojournalist), American photojournalist
- William Snyder (playwright) (1930–2008), American playwright
- William Snyder (politician) (born 1952), American state legislator in Florida
- William E. Snyder (Medal of Honor) (1883–1944), United States Navy officer and Medal of Honor recipient
- William L. Snyder (1918–1998), American film producer
- William E. Snyder (cinematographer), American cinematographer
- William H. Snyder, American politician in Illinois
- William McKendree Snyder (1848–1930), American painter
- William Preston Snyder (1851–1920), American politician and physician from Pennsylvania
- William T. Snyder, American academic and chancellor of the University of Tennessee Knoxville, 1992–1999
- Frank Prinzi, American cinematographer and a television director, sometimes credited as William Snyder
- Will Snyder, part of American country music duo Caitlin & Will
- Will Snyder (politician), American politician from Michigan
- Bill Snyder (born 1939), American college football coach
- Bill Snyder (American football, born 1911) (1911–1973), American football player
- Bill Snyder (animal trainer) (1864–1934), American zookeeper and elephant trainer
- Bill Snyder (baseball) (1898–1934), American Major League Baseball pitcher
- Bill Snyder (bandleader) (1916–2011), American songwriter
- Lt. William Snyder, fictional character from the 1973 film The Sting, played by Charles Durning
