= Garfield Bromley Oxnam =

American social reformer and bishop (1891–1963)

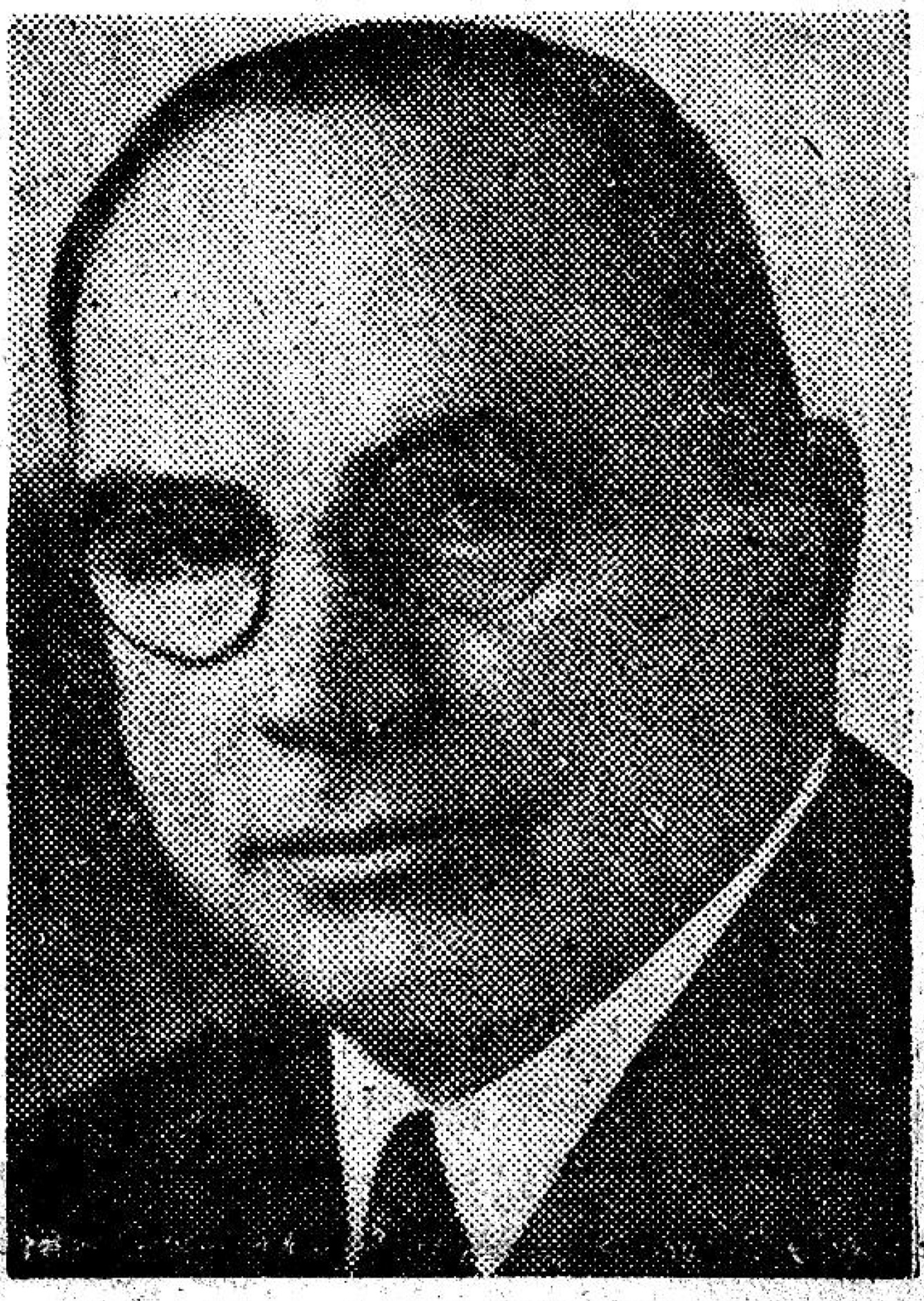
- Oxnam in 1953
- Born: March 13, 1963; Los Angeles, California, U.S.
- Died: March 13, 1963 (aged 71)
- Education: University of Southern California
- Occupations: Bishop, university administrator
- Children: Robert Fisher Oxnam

Garfield Bromley Oxnam (August 14, 1891 – March 12, 1963) was an American social reformer and American bishop in the Methodist Episcopal Church, elected in 1936.

== Early life ==
Garfield Bromley Oxnam was born on August 14, 1891, in Los Angeles. His father was a mining engineer and instilled in his son a conservative theology. Oxnam embraced these beliefs in his youth, even describing socialism as "the biggest idiocy ever presented to the public." However, in his early 20s Oxnam gravitated towards Dana W. Bartlett and the movements of the Social Gospel.

Oxnam's political tendencies moved further left at the University of Southern California. Under the tutelage of Progressive teachers Emory S. Bogardus, Rockwell D. Hunt, and James Main Dixon, Oxnam was encouraged to apply his knowledge of social issues in real life settings in Los Angeles. Oxnam became a volunteer Housing Inspector for the Los Angeles Housing Commission and ventured through the poorest districts of Los Angeles, a city that falsely proclaimed to have no slums. He took copious notes from his field work and vowed to use the power of the Church to eradicate the slums in Los Angeles.

== Social reform in Los Angeles ==
Oxnam graduated from the University of Southern California in 1913 and from the Boston University School of Theology in 1915. He was ordained in 1916 and then headed west to briefly run a church in California's Central Valley. However, he felt a strong desire to return to his hometown and eventually presided over the Church of All Nations, a multiethnic Church in Downtown Los Angeles. Through Oxnam's personal surveys, the Church of All Nations was comprised more than 46 nationalities. Oxnam's unprecedented fight for racial inclusion spearheaded the fight for immigrant worker rights in the ethnically diverse Los Angeles. He said the Methodist Church, which preached for greater racial integration, did not do enough in practice to further this cause.

Oxnam advocated for the Americanization of immigrants, but he fought with local Los Angeles organizations like Colonel Leroy Smith and the Better America Foundation over what Americanization truly meant. To Oxnam, the concept of Americanization went far beyond the Better America Foundation's narrow patriotic rhetoric, it embodied the education for citizenship based on social justice and workers' rights. This idea meant great potential strength for unions and collective bargaining rights because it would reduce the ethnic divisions between workers.

Oxnam, seeing an opportunity to improve the lives of Los Angeles citizens, ran to be on the Los Angeles Board of Education in what became an intense symbolic battle between the workingmen of Los Angeles and its conservative business owners. Oxnam was even accused of instigating a plot to "sovietize the public schools" in response to his declaration that teachers' opinions should be involved when they were making policy decisions. He ultimately lost the election as a result of slanderous accusations by the Los Angeles Times and the Better America Foundation, which were later used as evidence by the House Un-American Activities Committee.

== After Los Angeles ==
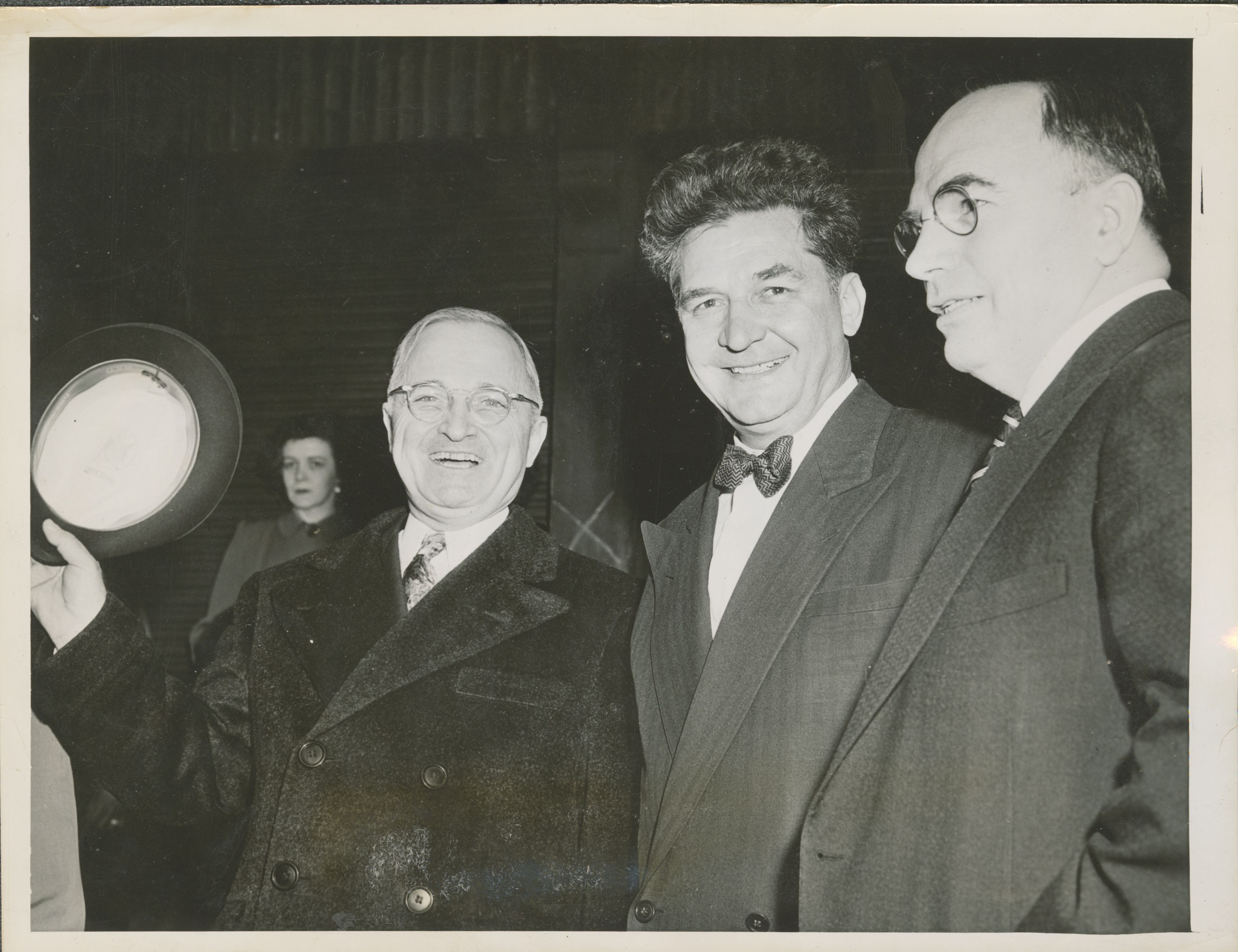
Bishop Oxnam (right) with President Harry S. Truman and Ohio Governor Frank Lausche attending the Federal Council of Churches in Columbus, Ohio in 1946

Oxnam left Los Angeles to be a professor of social ethics at Boston University in 1927. One year later he became president of De Pauw University, Greencastle, Indiana, where he was popular among students because he permitted dancing. As President he achieved a high level of national and international recognition, bringing DePauw unprecedented public attention. He stepped down as president upon his election as bishop in 1936, but still remained a prominent public figure. He advocated for progressive Church measures like Christian unity. He said on national television:

One of the principles we've got to insist upon is diversity in unity. In a word, we've got to conserve all the values of the many different searches for the eternal.

Oxnam also took slightly controversial positions against the Cold War. He opposed compulsory military training and the military reserves in peacetime for fear of how the rigors of military training and life can affect a man's thinking and philosophy. He also opposed the use of the atomic bomb by saying “There is something morally wrong with a weapon who destroys humanity.”

Oxnam was accused of being a communist by Donald L. Jackson and appeared before the House Un-American Activities Committee on July 21, 1953. He was extensively questioned about his alleged communist sympathies and his relations with other accused communists. At this time, many of the false accusations from his campaign for the Los Angeles School Board resurfaced as evidence against him. Oxnam repudiated these accusations and offered counter evidence to disprove accusations that he was related with the Industrial Workers of the World and had spoken at rallies with various radicals.

In 1958, Oxnam was successful in helping to found the School of International Service (SIS) at American University, the national Methodist university in Washington, D.C. In that effort, Oxnam was able to convince the General Conference of The Methodist Church to contribute over $1 million for the school's creation. The founding of the SIS was part of a vision held by Oxnam to create an academic institution "pledged to the study, proclamation and practice of the principles of freedom and the maintenance of civil, economic, and religious liberty by training competent and consecrated men and women for the international service of the state, the community and the church."

Oxnam was also responsible for the relocation of Westminster Theological Seminary from Westminster, Maryland to a location in Washington, D.C., on land belonging to American University. Once relocated, the seminary was renamed Wesley Theological Seminary.

After Oxnam's death on March 13, 1963, aged 71, his ashes were interred at Wesley Seminary in the chapel that bears his name. His son, Robert Fisher Oxnam, was also president of a Methodist-founded university, Drew University, from 1961 to 1974.

== Bibliography ==
Selected writings

- Russian Impressions, Los Angeles, 1927.
- Personalities in Social Reform, New York: Abingdon-Cokesbury Press, 1950.
- I Protest, New York: Harper, 1954.

Writing about G. Bromley Oxnam

- Rembert Gilman Smith, Garfield Bromley Oxnam, Revolutionist?, Houston: Rembert Gilman Smith, 1953.
- Robert Moats Miller, Bishop G. Bromley Oxnam, Nashville: Abingdon Press, 1990.

== See also ==
- List of bishops of the United Methodist Church
