= Admiral Fletcher =

Admiral Fletcher may refer to:

- Frank Jack Fletcher (1885–1973), admiral in the U.S. Navy during World War II
- Frank Friday Fletcher (1855–1928), admiral in the U.S. Navy
- William Bartlett Fletcher Sr. (1862–1957), rear admiral in the U.S. Navy
