= Bartlett Museum, Inc. =

Museum in Amesbury, Massachusetts

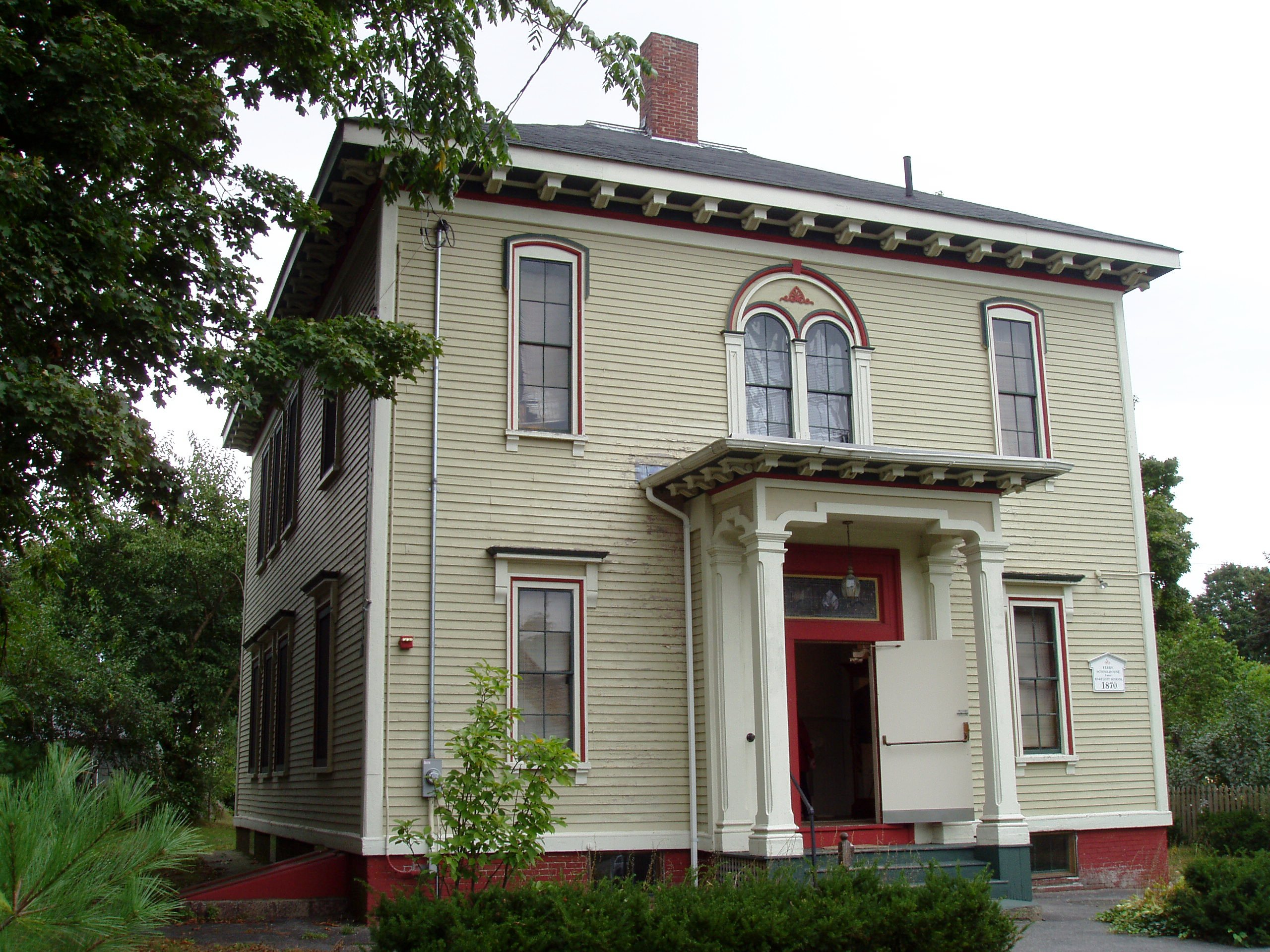

- Location within Massachusetts
- Established: 1968
- Location: 270 Main Street, Amesbury, Massachusetts
- Coordinates: 42.845°N 70.9276°W
- Website: Bartlett Museum

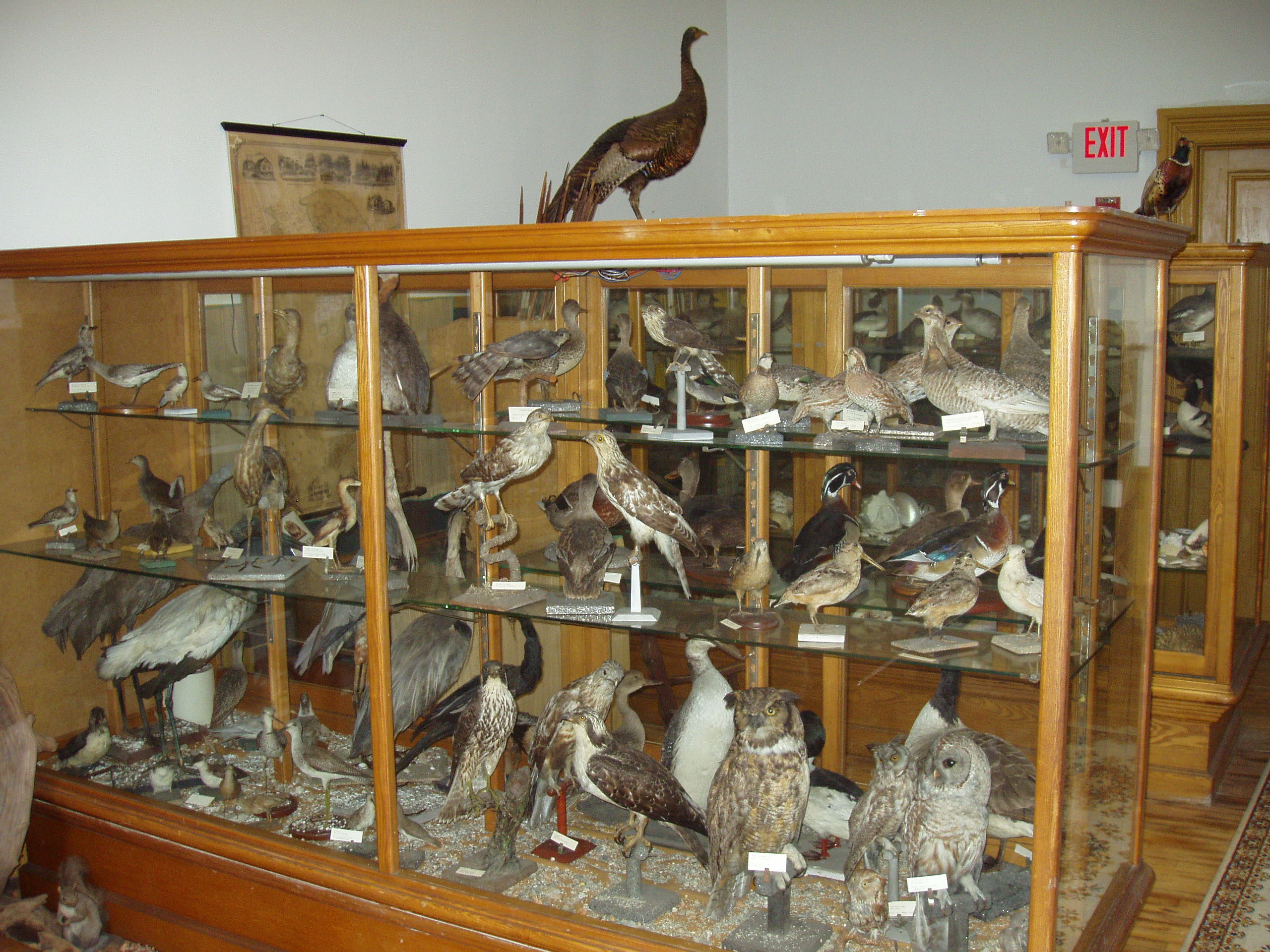
Natural History room.

The Bartlett Museum is a nonprofit museum located at 270 Main Street, Amesbury, Massachusetts. It is named after Josiah Bartlett, a Founding Father of the United States who was born in Amesbury and later signed the United States Declaration of Independence.

== History ==
The building was originally the Bartlett School from 1870 until it was closed in 1968. The museum was formed in 1968 as part of the celebrations for the 300th anniversary of the founding of the Town of Amesbury. As of 2009, the museum's exhibits included:

- Local history - Amesbury's former carriage industry, old maps, and mementos of local history.
- Natural history - a substantial collection of taxidermic birds, as well as fossils, minerals and shells.
- Native American collection - artifacts of local tribes.
- Schoolroom - an original room with antique school desks, children's games, and toys.

The museum also occasionally hosts a rotating exhibit.

The schoolhouse formerly contained the Salisbury Point Railroad Society's museum, with its collection of railroad items, however it was removed in 2006.
