= Mary Bartlett =

Colonial American woman (1739–1789)

- Born: December 27, 1730; Newton, Province of New Hampshire, British America
- Died: June 14, 1789 (aged 58); Kingston, New Hampshire, US
- Notable work: Correspondence with her husband while he was at the Continental Congress
- Spouse: Josiah Bartlett

Mary Bartlett (December 27, 1730 – June 14, 1789) was a colonial American woman, caretaker, and patriot of New Hampshire who assisted her husband in his career and life. Her husband, Josiah Bartlett, was a physician and patriot, who became the governor of New Hampshire after her death.

== Early life ==
Born December 27, 1730, Mary Bartlett was the daughter of Sarah (née Hoyt) and Joseph Bartlett, who fought in the French and Indian Wars in 1707 at Haverhill, Massachusetts. He was captured and held captive for four years in Canada by the Algonquin people.

Bartlett, who had nine siblings, was from Newton, New Hampshire. Well-educated, she was described as "a lady of excellent character and an ornament to society" by Levi Bartlett, the author of Genealogical and Biographical Sketches of the Bartlett Family in England and America (1876).

== Marriage and children ==
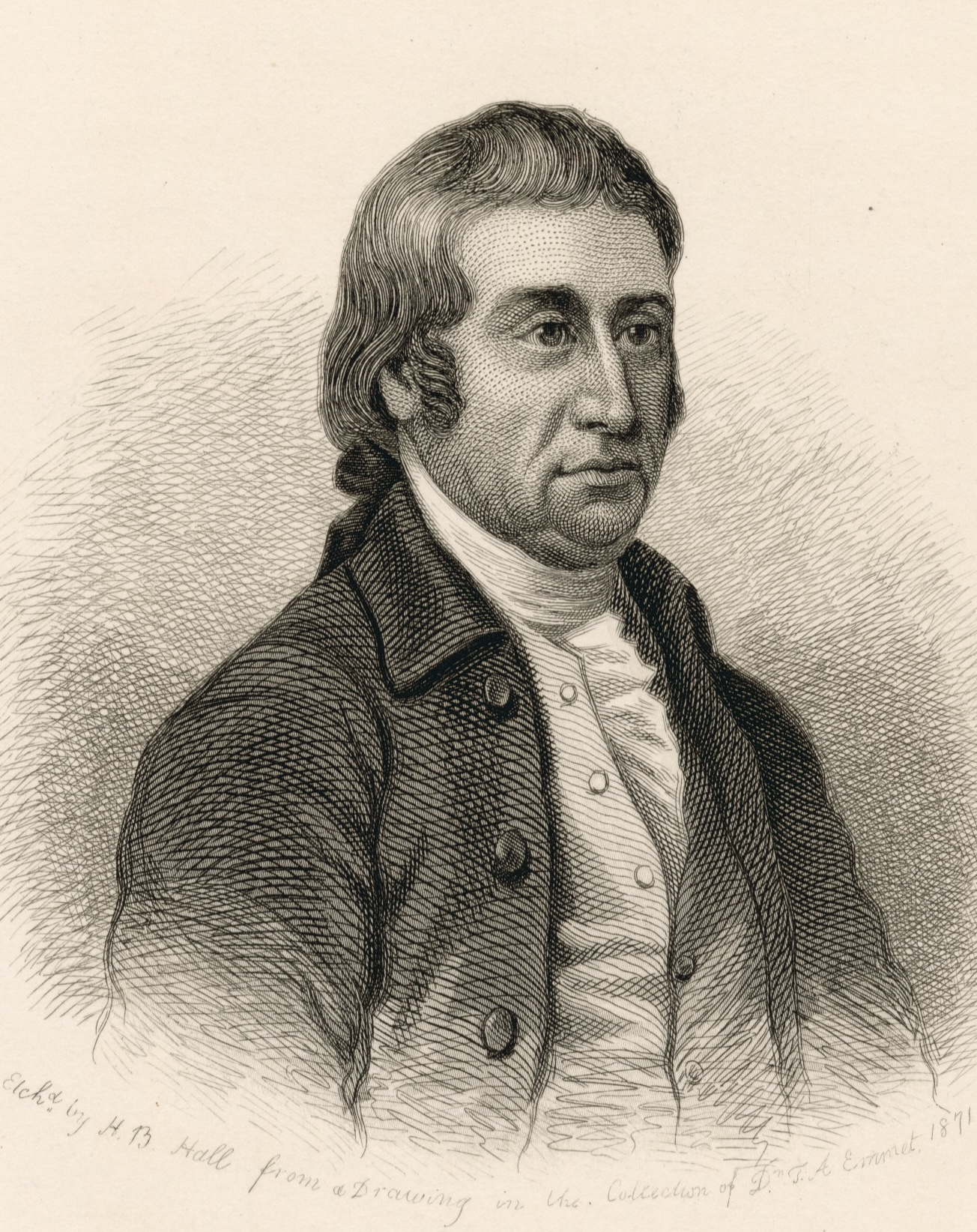
Josiah Bartlett

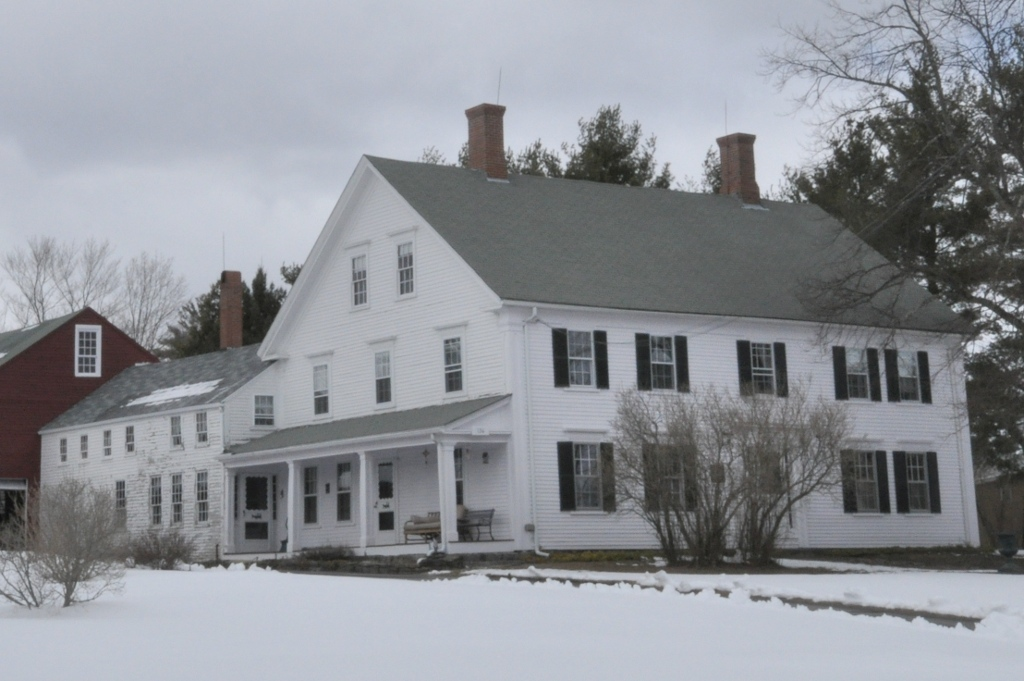
Josiah Bartlett House, Kingston, New Hampshire, National Register of Historic Places

On January 15, 1754, Mary Bartlett married her cousin Josiah Bartlett. Josiah received fame as a physician when he successfully treated black canker, a throat distemper (perhaps diphtheria), during an epidemic. He was a leader in the Committee of Correspondence, frequently in contact with Samuel Adams and other members. As Bartlett supported patriots and fought for American independence, he suffered political and personal repercussions, including when the Tories burned his house down in 1774. Bartlett, her husband, and their eight children had to find a new home for the short term. A new house was built in 1776.

Of twelve children, the following children lived to adulthood:

- Mary, born 1754, married Jonathan Greeley
- Lois, born 1756, never married
- Miriam, born 1758, married Joseph Calef
- Rhoda, born 1760, married Reuben True
- Levi, born 1763, became a physician
- Joseph or Josiah, born 1768, became a physician
- Ezra, born 1770, at age five in 1775 and 1776 was seriously ill while his father was away. He recuperated and became a physician who lived until 1848.
- Sarah, born 1773, married Amos Gale

Mary gave birth to two girls named Hannah. The second Hannah was conceived during Josiah's visit in the spring of 1776 and she was born December 13, 1776. She died in April 1777. Bartlett managed the birth and death of her daughter on her own.

== Life partner ==
Bartlett and her husband were good friends throughout their lives together. They had similar interests, like caring for his patients and desiring an independent country. She supported him, was his counsellor, and was directly involved in the lives of his patients. Bartlett helped his patients and their friends to "bear the[ir] home burdens".

Josiah left for Philadelphia in September 1775. He was at the Continental Congress in Philadelphia, and signed the Declaration of Independence (July 4, 1776). He was a creator of the Articles of Confederation (July 1776 and November 1777).

While he was away, Bartlett and her husband exchanged letters that "represent a rich cache of documents about late eighteenth-century and Revolutionary domestic life, in addition to much local news." Bartlett told her husband of the success of the apple and maize crops, news of the lives and deaths of family and neighbors, and other happenings in the community. Beyond mentioning what he was doing as a founder, Josiah mentioned how much he missed being home and the rural lifestyle, though he missed the smallpox epidemic in Philadelphia. Josiah received a vaccine, which gave him a case of smallpox for about six days.

Bartlett, pregnant at the time, managed the planting and harvesting of crops, cared for their large family, and oversaw the servants' work. They had an orchard with peach, apple, plum, and cherry trees. With that, she managed the stress of the war in Canada, and concern about the British invasion of Colonial America. Her concerns grew as goods became increasingly expensive and scarce. She was concerned that many of the men in the militia did not have the skills and fortitude to protect the people of the Province of New Hampshire. With these fears, as well as the threat of dying during childbirth, she asked her husband to return to their home during the winter months. Josiah went home for a bit, during which he treated men of the New Hampshire militia, and he then returned to Congress. In their letters they spoke of their fears and hopes, as well as the state of the crops at home. They shared information and thoughts about the movements of the British and the New Hampshire militia, as well as George Washington's intentions. Josiah stayed with Congress until someone from New Hampshire could replace him. In the meantime, he asked Bartlett to "order some wood" and hire someone "to tarry with you till my return in order to prepare for the winter."

Cokie Roberts said of Mary and women like her in her book Founding Mothers: The women who raised our nation,

Mary Bartlett's story is not one of high drama, at least not after she was burned out of house and home for her husband's political views, but it is one that shows how crucial a role these women played while their husbands fought the battles and formed the laws of the new nation. It was not just that they were making it all work at home, they were also passionate patriots themselves, engaged in the government and the war just as their husbands, sons, brothers, fathers, and friends were.

While Bartlett and Josiah were dedicated to the fight for independence, they fostered stability in their daily lives.

== Death ==
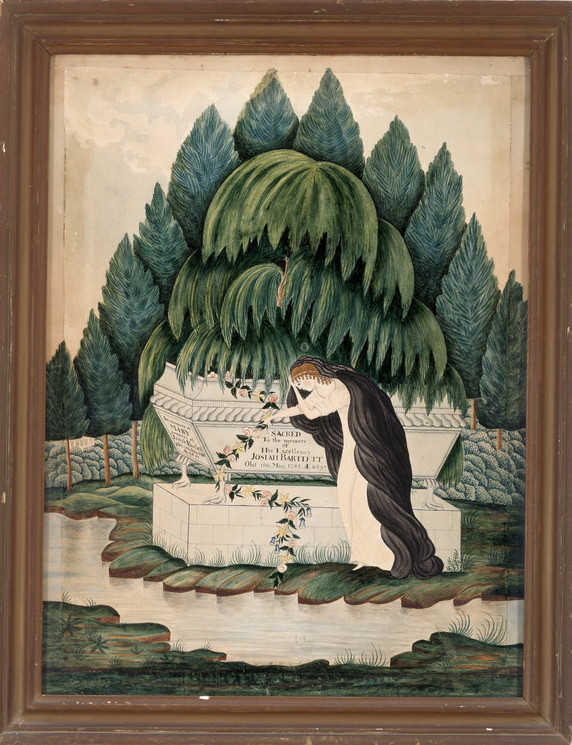
Laura Bartlett, Mourning Picture for Josiah Bartlett and Mary Bartlett, between 1795 and 1812, Historic New England

Bartlett died on July 14, 1789, in Kingston, New Hampshire. (Note: She is also said to have died June 14, 1789, based upon a letter about her death dated June 18, 1789. But, Josiah wrote a letter to his daughter Rhoda True that Bartlett died that day, July 14, 1789.) Josiah Bartlett died May 19, 1795. They are buried in the Bartlett Box Tomb at Plains Cemetery, Kingston, New Hampshire. Four of their children—Miriam, Sarah, Lois, and Levi—and their spouses are buried at the cemetery.

Daughter Laura Bartlett made the watercolor painting Mourning Picture for Josiah Bartlett and Mary Bartlett. On the sarcophagus was the message "Sacred to the memory of His Excellency Joseph Bartlett, Obit May, 1795 AE 65ys." and on the edge of the tomb is: "In the memory of Mary, consort of, Josiah Bartlett, Obit 14th July 1789 AE 58 ys."

== Legacy ==
The Mary Bartlett chapter of the Daughters of the American Revolution was named after Bartlett, wife of Josiah. The Mary Bartlett Fund was established to take in donations that were used for worthwhile projects, such as an elevator for the Memorial Continental Hall, books, and other endeavors.

== Bibliography ==
- Bartlett, Josiah (1979). The papers of Josiah Bartlett. Hanover, New Hampshire: Published for the New Hampshire Historical Society by the University Press of New England. ISBN 978-0-87451-168-0.
- Green, Harry Clinton; Green, Mary Wolcott (1912). Pioneer Mothers of America. G. P. Putnam's Sons. p. 452.
- Harris, Sharon M. (1996). American women writers to 1800. New York: Oxford University Press. ISBN 978-0-19-508453-5.
- Maier, Pauline (1982). The old revolutionaries : political lives in the age of Samuel Adams. New York: Vintage Books. ISBN 978-0-394-75073-6.
- Roberts, Cokie (2005). Founding Mothers : The women who raised our nation. New York: Perennial. ISBN 978-0-06-009026-5.
