= Mary Bartlett (disambiguation) =

Mary Bartlett (1730–1789) was a colonial American woman.

Mary Bartlett may also refer to:

- Mary Bartlett Bunge (1931–2024), American neuroscientist
- Mary Bartlett Dixon (1873–1957), American nurse and suffragist
- Mary Bartlet Leader (1918–2004), American author
