= Frank Mura =

American painter

Frank Mura (born 17 July 1861) was a French-born American painter and water colourist who also worked in charcoal and pencil. His work includes landscapes, buildings, marine settings, human subjects and animals. He was noted for his charcoal painting technique.

== Life and works ==
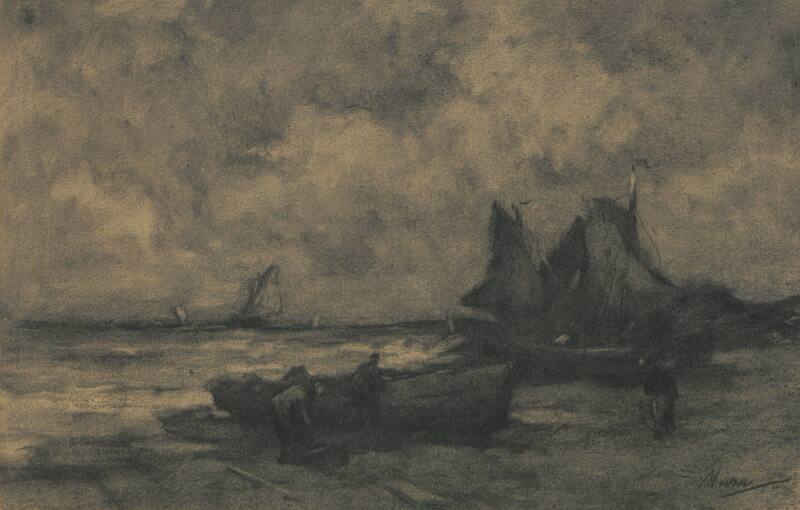
On the Beach - ABDAG004443

Born in Alsace in 1861, Mura's family settled in New York City when he was a child and he became a naturalised American. The family home was in Manhattan and his father's occupation was listed in the census as a feather dealer. He returned to Europe in 1881 and studied in Munich. During this period, some of his paintings were purchased by a wealthy New York collector, Ichabod T. Williams, which enabled him to pay an overdue account with his landlady and continue with his studies, his father having ceased his allowance. He also studied in the Netherlands.

Mura settled in London in 1891 and married the German-born painter Charlotte Poehlmann on 4 April 1894 in Hampstead. He created a series of oil paintings of London life, including Billingsgate Fishmarket (Studio Magazine) . They moved to Mill End studio, Little Easton, Dunmow, and had one daughter, Margaret Mura, born c.1902. In 1911, the Muras were living at Myrtle Cottage, Sompting, Sussex.

Mura remained in London until 1915, painting and teaching. He contributed work to The Dome and exhibited at the Goupil Gallery and the Obach and Co. Gallery. He exhibited alongside James Abbott McNeill Whistler at the NEAC in 1903, and his Landscape with Sheep was exhibited at the Royal Academy in 1904. His work was exhibited at the Louisiana Purchase Expo St. Louis World's Fair in 1904 and received the highest award for charcoal painting. In 1907 the Obach Gallery exhibited a collection of his pictures and charcoal drawings. A review in The Studio commented: "Mr. Mura successfully imparts the true feeling for English landscape in a style which has benefited much from the study of the Barbizon and Dutch masters." An essay on his work by A. L. Baldry was published in The Studio in London in 1913.

Mura then settled in Brooklyn, New York, where he made his name in American artistic circles. He exhibited 11 charcoal drawings at the Panama–Pacific International Exposition of 1915 which won a Medal of Honour. During the 1920s and 30s, he was a guide and instructor at the Brooklyn Museum, directing a Saturday class for talented high school students. The museum holds a collection of his pencil drawings from 1919 onwards. Two of his English landscape paintings, Upton Lane, Sompting and The Adur, near Shoreham, are held in the University of Michigan Museum of Art.
