= USS Birmingham (CL-2) =

Chester-class scout cruiser of the US Navy, in service from 1908 to 1923

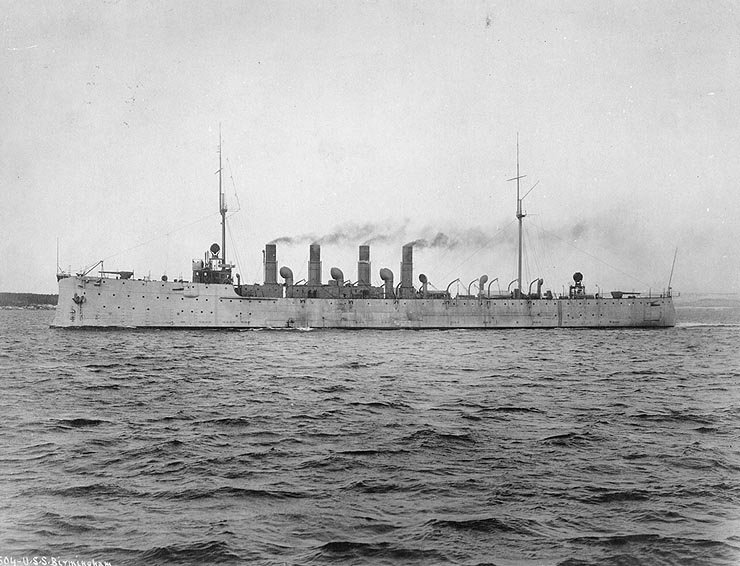
- USS Birmingham (CS-2), 1908

History

United States
- Name: Birmingham
- Namesake: City of Birmingham, Alabama
- Ordered: 27 April 1904
- Awarded: 17 May 1905
- Builder: Fore River Shipyard, Quincy Point, Quincy, Massachusetts
- Cost: $1,566,000 (contract price of hull and machinery)
- Laid down: 14 August 1905
- Launched: 29 May 1907
- Sponsored by: Miss Mary Campbell
- Commissioned: 11 April 1908
- Decommissioned: 1 December 1923
- Reclassified: CL-2, 17 July 1920
- Identification: Hull symbol: CS-2; Hull symbol: CL-2
- Fate: Sold for scrap, 13 May 1930

General characteristics (As built)
- Class & type: Chester-class Scout cruiser
- Displacement: 3,750 long tons (3,810 t) (standard); 4,687 long tons (4,762 t) (full load)
- Length: 423 ft 1 in (128.96 m) oa; 420 ft (130 m) pp
- Beam: 47 ft 1 in (14.35 m)
- Draft: 16 ft 9 in (5.11 m) (mean)
- Installed power: 12 × Fore River boilers; 16,000 ihp (12,000 kW); 15,670 ihp (11,690 kW) (produced on Trial)
- Propulsion: 2 × vertical triple expansion engines; 2 × screws
- Speed: 24 knots (44 km/h; 28 mph); 24.33 knots (45.06 km/h; 28.00 mph) (Speed on Trial)
- Complement: 42 officers 330 enlisted
- Armament: 4 × 5 in (130 mm)/50 caliber Mark 6 breech-loading rifles; 6 × 3 in (76 mm)/50 caliber rapid-fire guns (6x1); 2 × 3-pounder (47 mm (1.9 in) Driggs-Schroeder saluting guns; 2 × 21 inch (533 mm) torpedo tubes
- Armor: Belt: 2 in (5.1 cm); Deck: 1 in (25 mm) (aft)

General characteristics (1921)
- Complement: 64 officers 332 enlisted
- Armament: 4 × 5 in (130 mm)/51 caliber guns; 2 × 3 in (76 mm)/50 caliber rapid-fire guns; 1 × 3 in (76 mm)/50 caliber anti-aircraft gun; 2 × 3-pounder (47 mm (1.9 in) saluting guns; 2 × 21 in (533 mm) torpedo tubes

USS Birmingham (CS-2/CL-2), named for the city of Birmingham, Alabama, was a Chester-class scout cruiser, reclassified a light cruiser in 1920. Entering service in 1908, the ship became known for the first airplane takeoff from a ship in history in 1910. During World War I, Birmingham escorted convoys across the Atlantic. The cruiser was decommissioned in 1923 and sold for scrap in 1930.

== Construction and career ==
The cruiser was laid down by the Fore River Shipbuilding Company at Quincy, Massachusetts, on 14 August 1905, and launched on 29 May 1907; sponsored by Miss Mary Campbell. Birmingham was commissioned on 11 April 1908, Commander Burns Tracy Walling in command.

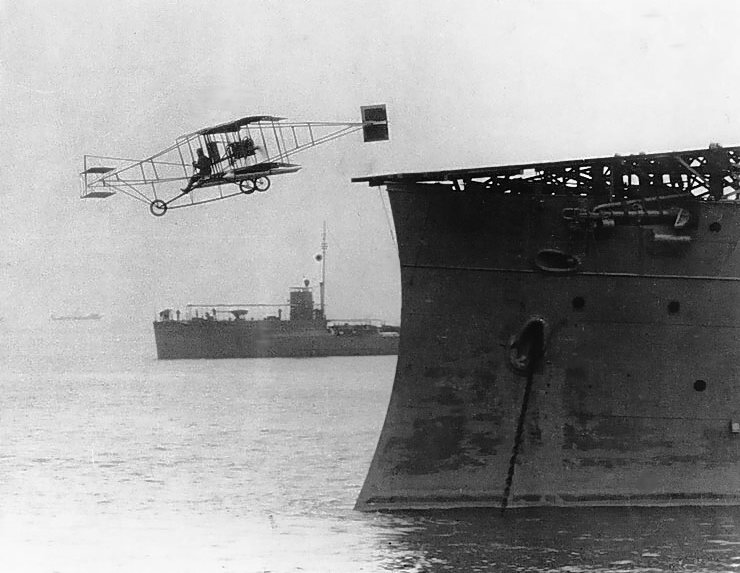
Pilot Eugene Ely takes off from USS Birmingham, Hampton Roads, Virginia, 14 November 1910

Birmingham served with the Atlantic Fleet until 27 June 1911, and went into reserve at Boston three days later. One of her sailors, Chief Electrician William E. Snyder, received the Medal of Honor for rescuing a shipmate from drowning on 4 January 1910. From Birmingham's deck, civilian pilot Eugene Ely made the first airplane take-off from a warship on 14 November 1910 in a Curtiss Model D biplane designed by Glenn Curtiss.

Recommissioned on 15 December 1911, she made a short cruise to the West Indies and then reverted to the Atlantic Reserve Fleet at Philadelphia on 20 April 1912. From 19 May – 11 July, she was in commission for service on Ice Patrol and then returned to the Philadelphia Reserve Group. Recommissioned on 1 October 1913, Birmingham carried the Commissioners of the Panama–Pacific International Exposition on a South American tour from 3 October – 26 December, and was then outfitted at Philadelphia Navy Yard as a tender to the Torpedo Flotilla.

She left the yard on 2 February 1914, and resumed operations with the Atlantic Fleet as flagship of the Torpedo Flotilla. On April 20, she received orders to carry a detachment of aircraft to Tampico as part of the US occupation of Veracruz, becoming part of the first operational use of naval aircraft. On May 24, after spending a month near Tampico, she rendezvoused with the fleet at Veracruz before returning to the United States.

=== World War I and fate ===
Following American entrance into World War I, Birmingham patrolled along the northeast U.S. coast until 14 June 1917, when she sailed from New York City as part of the escort for the first US troop convoy to France. After returning to New York, she was fitted for service in Europe and in August reported to Gibraltar as flagship for Rear Admiral A. P. Niblack, Commander, US Forces Gibraltar. She escorted convoys between Gibraltar, the British Isles, and France until the Armistice. After a short cruise in the eastern Mediterranean, she returned to the United States in January 1919.

From July 1919 to May 1922, she was based at San Diego, California, as flagship of Destroyer Squadrons, Pacific Fleet, and then moved to Balboa, Canal Zone, as flagship of the Special Service Squadron. After cruising along the Central American and northern South American coast, she returned to Philadelphia and was decommissioned there on 1 December 1923, being sold for scrap on 13 May 1930.

== Commanders ==
- Burns Tracy Walling 11 April 1908 – 9 May 1909
- William Bartlett Fletcher 28 October 1909 – 1910
- Charles Frederick Hughes 18 December 1911 – 1912
- William Veazie Pratt c. 1914 –
- David Foote Sellers January 1915 – 9 June 1916
- DeWitt Blamer 9 June 1916 – November 1916
- Charles Lincoln Hussey c. 1917 – 1918
- Franck Taylor Evans 28 April 1919 – November 1919
- George Bertram Landenberger 1920 –
