= Plains Cemetery =

Historic cemetery in Rockingham County, New Hampshire, US

- U.S. National Register of Historic Places
- Location within New Hampshire Location within the United States
- Location: Cemetery Lane, Kingston, New Hampshire, U.S.
- Coordinates: 42.9340°N 71.0522°W
- Built: c. 1725 (301 years ago)
- NRHP reference No.: 100007290
- Added to NRHP: December 27, 2021

Plains Cemetery, also known as Village Cemetery, is an historic cemetery on Cemetery Lane in Kingston, New Hampshire. Established in 1725, it includes the tomb of Josiah Bartlett, the second signer of the United States Declaration of Independence. The cemetery was added to the National Register of Historic Places in December 2021.

== Notable interrments ==
- Josiah Bartlett
- Mary Bartlett

== See also ==
- National Register of Historic Places listings in Rockingham County, New Hampshire
