= USS Neches (AO-5) =

Oiler of the United States Navy

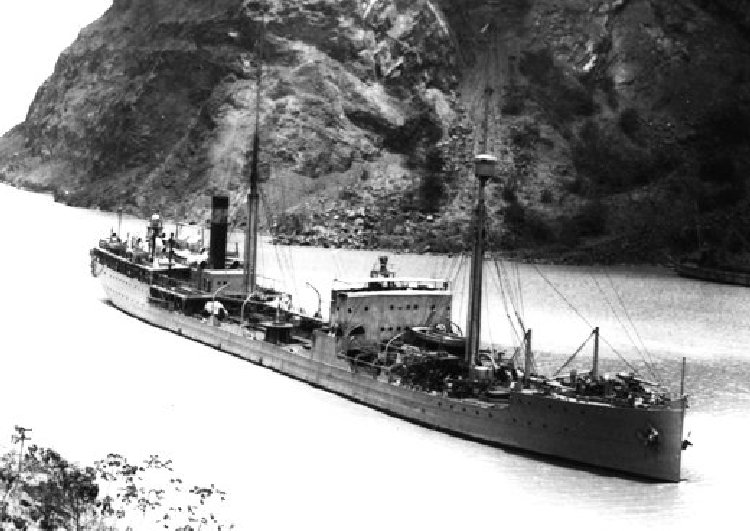

History

United States
- Name: USS Neches
- Namesake: Neches River
- Laid down: 8 June 1919
- Launched: 2 June 1920
- Sponsored by: Helen Griffin
- Commissioned: 25 October 1920
- Identification: Hull number: AO-5
- Fate: Torpedoed and sunk by I-72, 23 January 1942

General characteristics
- Class & type: Kanawaha-class replenishment oiler
- Displacement: 5,723 long tons (5,815 t)
- Length: 475 feet (144.8 m)
- Beam: 56 feet (17.1 m)
- Draft: 26 feet 6 inches (8.1 m)
- Speed: 14 knots (26 km/h; 16 mph)
- Complement: 144
- Armament: 2 × 5 in (127 mm) guns; 2 × 3 in (76 mm) guns

USS Neches (AO–5) was laid down on 8 June 1919 by the Boston Navy Yard in Boston, Massachusetts; launched on 2 June 1920, sponsored by Miss Helen Griffin, daughter of Rear Admiral Robert Griffin; and commissioned on 25 October 1920.

Originally classified as Fuel Ship No. 17 through 1920, Neches was assigned to Boston until 3 March 1922. During service with the Atlantic Fleet, she performed fleet fuel duties along the East Coast, participated in tactical exercises, carried mail, and towed targets. She also made several trips to Port Arthur, Texas, for fuel oil and gasoline.

She fueled at Fall River, Massachusetts, in early March 1922 and then steamed for Norfolk, Virginia. She next got underway for her new home yard at Mare Island, California, and thence to San Diego, California, her new homeport, whence she operated as a fleet oiler. She underwent overhaul commencing on 1 May 1926 at Mare Island, during which a new hydraulic gasoline stowage system was installed. During the ensuing 15 years, Neches was a busy ship. She participated in and helped develop fleet tactics, fueled the fleet, and supplied oil and gasoline to bases in the Panama Canal Zone, the Caribbean, and Hawaii.

The oiler was underway from San Diego to Pearl Harbor when the Japanese attacked that base. She arrived on 10 December 1941, rapidly off-loaded and hurriedly returned to San Pedro in order to take on more cargo for Pearl Harbor. Neches was returning to Pearl Harbor with the damage control hulk DCH 1 (IX-44), formerly the destroyer USS Walker, in tow. On 28 December 1941, DCH 1 was cast adrift and scuttled by gunfire from Neches at 26°35′N 143°49′W.

Neches steamed from Pearl Harbor late in the afternoon of 22 January 1942, headed for the western Pacific as the re-fueling ship for the task force containing the aircraft carrier USS Lexington. Shortly after midnight, the watch discerned a possible submarine at a range of about 1,000 yards (910 m) and immediately took evasive action. At 03:10 there was a heavy thud amidships, probably a dud torpedo.

At 03:19 a torpedo from I-72 struck the oiler on the starboard side abaft the engine room. The explosion caused extensive flooding in the engine room spaces, although water did not reach the fire room. At 03:28 the submarine was sighted to port just before another torpedo struck the port side. Both 5-inch (127 mm) guns took the submarine under fire and continued firing until 03:35, when the list to starboard made it impossible to depress the guns sufficiently.

Neches slowly settled forward and the list to starboard increased steadily. She sank at 04:37, with a loss of fifty-seven men, at, approximately 120 nautical miles (220 km) west of Pearl Harbor. Three injured men were picked up by a seaplane after sunrise. A destroyer arrived by noon to pick up the rest of the men in the life boats. A total of 126 survivors were rescued, a few men were on a lifeboat for several days before rescue, including the captain in his pajamas.

The commanding officer of the oiler, Commander William Bartlett Fletcher, Jr., was the son of Rear Admiral William Bartlett Fletcher, Sr. Fletcher, Junior would go on to make rear admiral after the sinking.

Click for interview with USS Neches Survivor
