= Polly Bartlett =

Reputed Wyoming serial killer

- Born: Polly Bartlett
- Died: October 7, 1868; South Pass City, Wyoming, U.S.
- Cause of death: Homicide by gunshots
- Other name: The Murderess of Slaughterhouse Gulch
- Occupation: Innkeeper
- Years active: 1868
- Parent: Jim Bartlett
- Relatives: Hattie Bartlett
- Motive: Robbery
- Reward amount: $3000 (Oregon Territorial Legislature) $10000 (Bernard Fountain)
- Wanted since: August 1868
- Time at large: Approximately 2 months

Details
- Victims: 22
- State: Wyoming
- Weapon: Arsenic
- Date apprehended: October 7, 1868

Polly Bartlett, also known as The Murderess of Slaughterhouse Gulch, is purported to have been a 19th-century murderer from the Wyoming Territory. She is said to have been the first serial killer in Wyoming, before it was even incorporated as a state. While the story has been repeated in several publications, Wyoming historians such as Phil Roberts and Jon Lane say that there is no evidence that the story is true.

According to stories, Bartlett killed men who entered her family lodge with the complicity of her father in 1868, amounting to a total of 22 murders, every victim found buried on her property.

A 1963 article by Dean W. Ballinger and published in the popular Real West magazine is one of the earliest and most detailed accounts of the Bartlett family murders. Today, South Pass City is a ghost town in arrested decay, and Bartlett's Inn is regarded as a folk tale by the local citizens.

== Story ==
As the accounts go, Bartlett lured businessmen and other travelers carrying valuables into her lodge. She gave them meals and whiskey laced with arsenic to poison them. Her father Jim (whose name is otherwise given as John or Stephen in other accounts) helped bury the men's bodies, and if asked about their disappearances, the daughter and father blamed indigenous Americans or outlaws.

Before moving to Wyoming, Bartlett and her father allegedly ran a saloon in Ohio, where the daughter isolated men for sex before the father robbed them. They took $4000 from their first victim, Lewis Nichols, which they used to construct the lodge east of South Pass City, Wyoming, which was busy with travelers due to a gold rush. When they killed the son of mine owner Bernard Fountain in August 1868, Fountain hired investigators from Pinkerton to track his son.

The pair fled once they realized they had been found out. When police searched their property, they unearthed the remains of several victims. A bounty was offered for the two; as a result, Ed Ford, who had himself escaped being murdered by the Bartletts only for his brother Sam to end up a victim, set out to capture them. On October 7, 1868, Ford shot and killed Jim and turned Polly in for trial. That same evening, Polly was shot dead through the window of her jail cell by Otto Kalkhorst, a German-born man assigned to one of Fountain's mines. Kalkhorst was not charged by justice of the peace, Esther Morris, so the case could be closed.
