= Thomas Bartlet =

Thomas Bartlet may refer to:

- Thomas Bartlet (Dedham Covenant) (17th century), signer of the Dedham Covenant

== See also ==
- Thomas Bartlett (disambiguation)
