= Jason Bartlett =

Jason Bartlett may refer to:

- Jason Bartlett (baseball) (born 1979), retired American baseball player
- Jason Bartlett (politician), American politician
- Jason Bartlett (singer), contestant in Australian Idol in 2009
