= Thomas Bartlett =

Thomas Bartlett may refer to:

- Thomas Bartlett (theologian) (1789–1872), English clergyman and theological writer
- Thomas Bartlett Jr. (1808–1876), US Representative from Vermont
- Thomas A. Bartlett (born 1930), American educator
- Thomas Bartlett (historian) (born 1948), author and professor of Irish history
- Doveman (Thomas Bartlett, born 1981), American singer and keyboard player
- Tommy Bartlett (basketball) (1928–2016), American college basketball coach

== See also ==
- Tommy Bartlett (1914–1998), American showman
- Thomas Bartlet (disambiguation)
