= John Bartlett (rugby union) =

- Full name: John Dudley Bartlett
- Born: 6 August 1907 Carmarthen, Wales
- Died: 17 January 1967 (aged 59) Hayling Island, Hampshire, England

Rugby union career
- Position: Wing
International career
| Years | Team | Apps | (Points) |
| 1927–28 | Wales | 3 | (3) |

John Dudley Bartlett (6 August 1907 – 17 January 1967) was a Welsh international rugby union player.

Bartlett was educated at Llandovery College and the University of Cambridge.

A Carmarthen wing three–quarter, Bartlett was capped three times for Wales, debuting against Scotland in 1927. He made a further two appearances in the 1928 Five Nations and contributed a try in their narrow loss to England.

Bartlett was a local curate outside of rugby and in 1934 joined the Royal Navy as a chaplain.

== See also ==
- List of Wales national rugby union players
