= John Bartlett (racing driver) =

English race driver

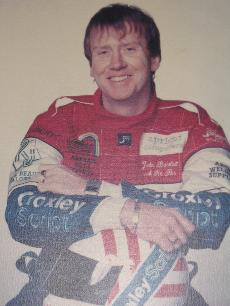
- Nationality: British
- Born: 19 January 1955 (age 71) Hove, East Sussex, England
- Retired: 1993
- Years active: 14
- Teams: Goodmans Team Chevron, Roy Baker Racing, Grand Prix Racing Promotions, Team Bardon, Gunner Porsche, Star Union, R & D Motorsport
- Starts: 140
- Wins: 6
- Poles: 3
- Fastest laps: 5
- Best finish: Willhire 24 Hours in 1991

John Bartlett (born 19 January 1955) is best known as a former WSCC race driver and team owner in the 1980's. He first started racing FF1600 cars (Lotus 61) in 1979 before moving into sports prototypes (Group C1, C2 & Group 6).

In 1983 Bartlett began to establish his name as a sports car driver in the British Thundersports series and the BRDC Sportscar Championship before moving into the World Championship in 1984 and running his own Group C2 team at Le Mans 24 Hour in 1984, 85 and 86.

John Bartlett raced sports prototype cars throughout most of his career, including Lola (T610), Chevron (B62), Bardon (DB1), Tiga, Spice and Porsche 966 (Group C & Group C2) in a career spanning some fourteen years. He also had a brief foray into the IMSA GT Championship in the US racing a Spice and at the Snetterton Willhire 24 Hours in 1991 winning class A driving a Ford Sierra RS Cosworth with Dave Mercer.

In his final season in 1993, Bartlett raced the Lola T89 Buick Indy car for the Star Union Team in the German Interserie championship.

John Bartlett, currently Managing Director of Maidstone Scuba School, is a Master Instructor of SCUBA divers.

In 2010 he completed his first novel Chequered Justice (ISBN 978184624524-4), a legal thriller alternating between the race track and the British justice system. In 2011 the Kindle eBook version of the book reached Number 1 in Amazon's bestseller list for courtroom thrillers and in August 2013 it won a Book of the Day Award.

His second novel, Dark Horse (a prequel to Chequered Justice), was released in November 2012 by Amazing Journeys in print (ISBN 978-0-9569104-1-7) and as a Kindle eBook. In 2013, Leslie Phillips voiced an unabridged audiobook edition of Chequered Justice (ISBN 978-0-9569104-9-3) along with Nick Ross, the former Crimewatch, and Watchdog presenter, who guest voiced one section.
