= Charles Bartlett =

Charles Bartlett may refer to:

== Artists ==
- Charles W. Bartlett (1860–1940), English painter and printmaker
- Charles Bartlett (artist) (1921–2014), British artist

== Athletes ==
- Charles Henry Bartlett (cyclist) (1885–1968), British track cyclist
- Charles Bartlett (American football) (1899–1965), college football player
- Charles Bartlett (rower), Australian lightweight rower

== Politicians ==
- Charles W. Bartlett (lawyer) (1845–1916), American lawyer and politician
- Charles L. Bartlett (Georgia politician) (1853–1938), U.S. representative from Georgia, 1895–1915
- Charles L. Bartlett (mayor) (1851–1898), U.S. baker and mayor of Marlborough, Massachusetts
- Charles H. Bartlett (1833–1900), American lawyer and politician in New Hampshire
- Charles A.P. Bartlett (1880–1948), American politician from Pennsylvania

== Others ==
- Charles L. Bartlett (journalist) (1921–2017), winner of the 1956 Pulitzer Prize for National Reporting
- Charles Bartlett (film director) (1888–1949), American silent film director
- Charles Alfred Bartlett (Iceberg Charlie, 1868–1945), captain of HMHS Britannic
- Charles Bartlett (RAF officer) (1889–1986), English World War I flying ace

== See also ==
- Charles Bartlett Johnson (born 1933), American businessman and billionaire
- Charlie Bartlett, a 2007 film comedy
