= Charles Bartlett (artist) =

British painter

Charles Harold Bartlett (23 September 1921 – 19 December 2014) was a British artist and printmaker.
