= Paul Bartlett =

Paul Bartlett may refer to:

- Paul Bartlett (painter) (1881–1965), American landscape painter
- Paul Alexander Bartlett (1909–1990), American writer and poet
- Paul Doughty Bartlett (1907–1997), American chemist
- Paul Wayland Bartlett (1865–1925), American sculptor
