= Kevin Bartlett =

Kevin Bartlett may refer to:

- Kevin Bartlett (Australian rules footballer) (born 1947), Australian rules footballer for Richmond
- Kevin Bartlett (English footballer) (born 1962), English association football player
- Kevin Bartlett (racing driver) (born 1940), Australian former open wheel and touring car racing driver
- Kevin Bartlett (athlete) (born 1981), Barbadian long jumper and sprinter

== See also ==
- Bartlett (disambiguation)
