= William E. Snyder (Medal of Honor) =

William Ellsworth Snyder
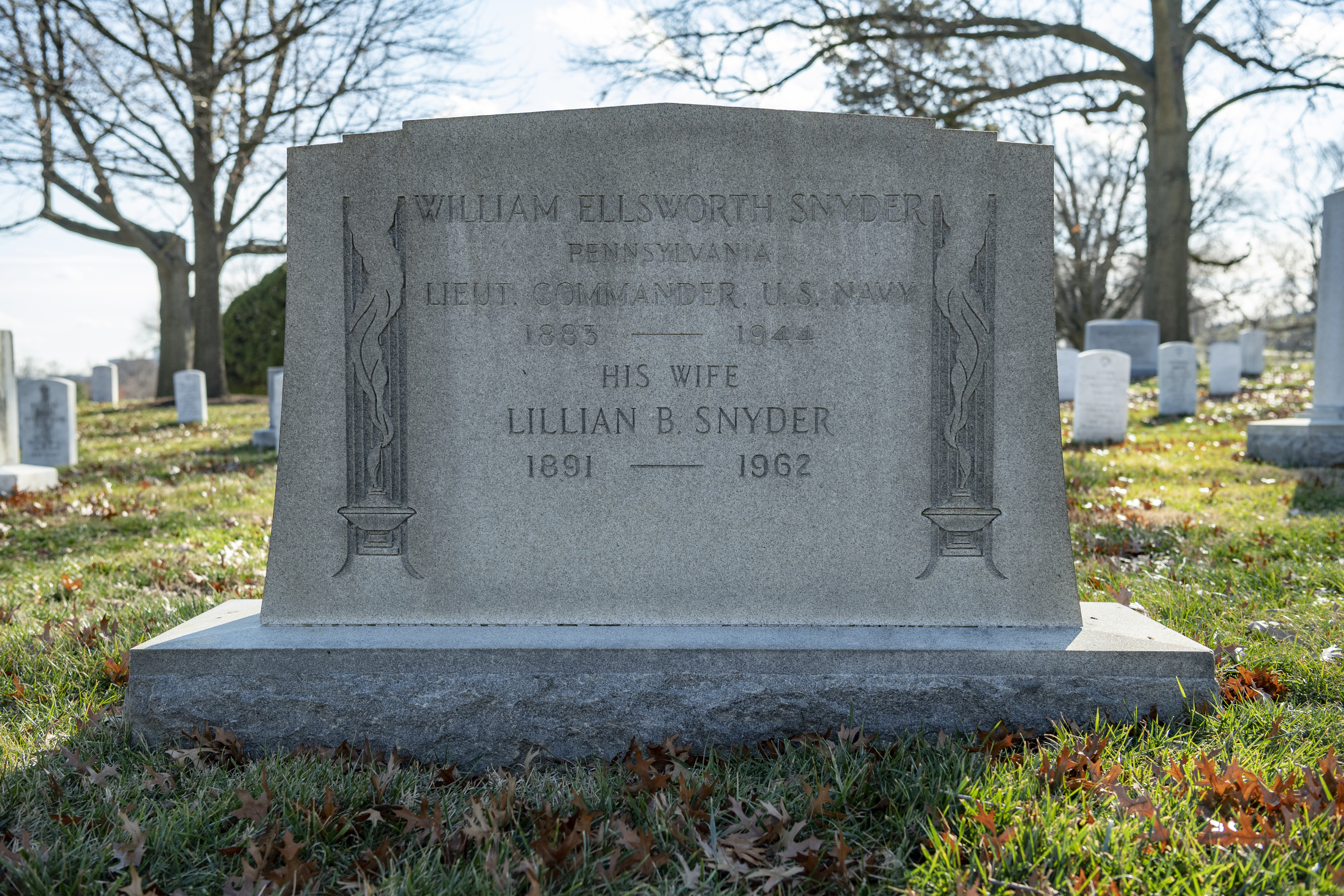
- Grave at Arlington National Cemetery
- Born: February 24, 1883; South Bethlehem, Pennsylvania, US
- Died: December 30, 1944 (aged 61)
- Burial place: Arlington National Cemetery
- Military career
- Allegiance: United States
- Branch: United States Navy
- Service years: 1903 - 1930
- Rank: Lieutenant
- Unit: USS Birmingham (CL-2)
- Awards: Medal of Honor

William Ellsworth Snyder (February 24, 1883 – December 30, 1944) was a United States Navy sailor and a recipient of the United States military's highest decoration, the Medal of Honor.

== Biography ==
A native of South Bethlehem, Pennsylvania, Snyder joined the Navy from that state.

On January 4, 1910, he was serving as a chief electrician on the USS Birmingham (CL-2). On that day, while the Birmingham was anchored at Hampton Roads in Virginia, Seaman George Hilldyberth Kephart fell overboard into the freezing cold water. Although the temperature was around 0 °F (−18 °C) and a strong tide was running, Snyder jumped into the water and rescued Kephart from drowning. For this action, he was awarded the Medal of Honor two months later, on March 2, 1910. The medal was formally presented to him by President William Howard Taft at the White House on December 13 of that year.

Snyder's official Medal of Honor citation reads:

Serving on board the U.S.S. Birmingham, for extraordinary heroism, rescuing G.H. Kephart seaman, from drowning at Hampton Roads, Va., 4 January 1910.

Snyder was promoted to the warrant officer rank of gunner on 3 December 1915.

During the First World War, Snyder became a commissioned officer when he was promoted to the temporary rank of lieutenant on 21 September 1918 and received a permanent promotion to that rank on 3 August 1920. He retired from the Navy on May 26, 1930.

Snyder died at age 61 and was buried at Arlington National Cemetery in Arlington County, Virginia.

== See also ==
- List of Medal of Honor recipients
