= Josiah Bartlett House =

Historic house in New Hampshire, United States

- U.S. National Register of Historic Places
- U.S. National Historic Landmark
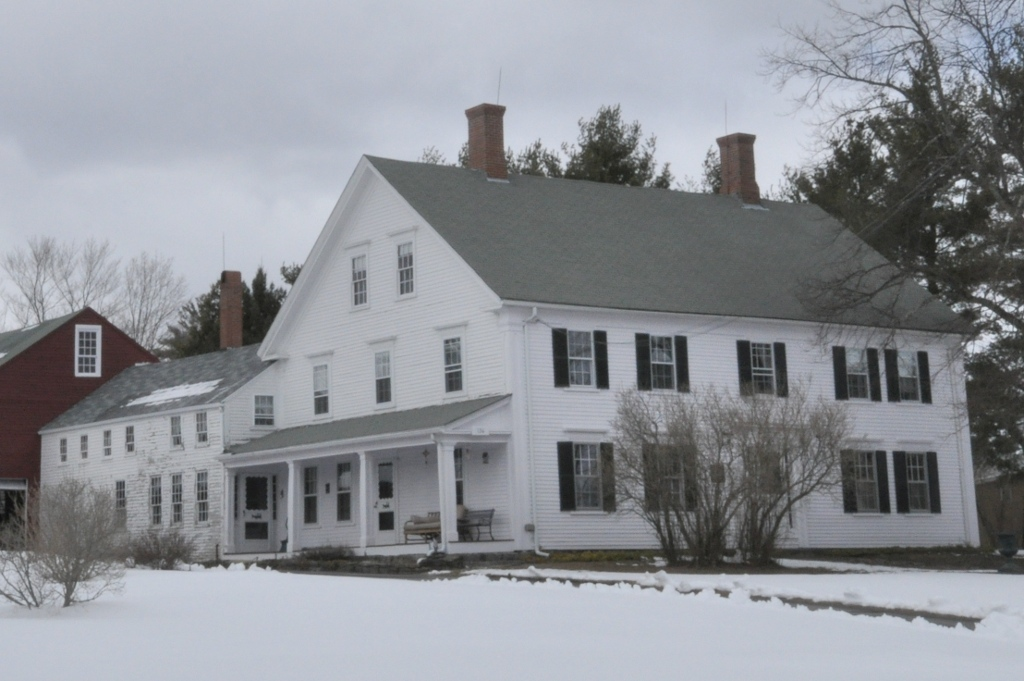
- Josiah Bartlett House

- Location within New Hampshire Location within the United States
- Location: Main Street, Kingston, New Hampshire
- Coordinates: 42°56′11″N 71°3′18″W
- Built: 1774
- NRHP reference No.: 71000050

Significant dates
- Added to NRHP: November 11, 1971
- Designated NHL: November 11, 1971

The Josiah Bartlett House is a house in Kingston, New Hampshire. The 2 1/2-story wood-frame house is located on Main Street, opposite Town Hall. The main block of the house, five bays wide and three deep, was built in 1774 by U.S. Founding Father Josiah Bartlett, replacing a house which was destroyed by fire. During the first decades of the 19th century, Greek Revival styling was added to the house, as was a two-story addition to the rear. The Greek Revival elements include large corner pilasters, projecting lintels over some of the windows, and the front door surround, which has pilasters and a cornice.

The house was declared a National Historic Landmark in 1971, for its association with Bartlett. Josiah Bartlett (1729–1795) was born in Amesbury, Massachusetts, was trained as a physician, and established a practice in Kingston. He was politically opposed to British rule, serving as one of New Hampshire's representatives to the Continental Congress, and was likely the second signer of the United States Declaration of Independence after John Hancock. There were allegations made that Bartlett's first house was burned down by Loyalist agents due to his political activities before the American Revolution, but he gave these accusations no credence. He gave medical services to the rebel troops at the 1777 Battle of Bennington, and served as Governor of New Hampshire from 1790 to 1794. He died in this house in 1795. The house is a private residence (still owned by Bartlett descendants in 1971), and is not normally open to the public.

== See also ==
- List of National Historic Landmarks in New Hampshire
- National Register of Historic Places listings in Rockingham County, New Hampshire
