= John W. Bartlett =

English football manager

John W. Bartlett (born c. 1877) was a football manager.

Bartlett served as the manager of Leicester City F.C. from 1912 until the start of World War I in 1914.
