= John Knowlton Bartlett =

American physician

John Knowlton Bartlett was a medical doctor.

== Biography ==
Bartlett was born in Portsmouth, New Hampshire in 1816. He graduated from Yale University in 1838 and from the Yale School of Medicine in 1841. Later that year, he moved to Milwaukee, Wisconsin and opened a medical practice. Bartlett would serve as Vice President of the American Medical Association in 1872, Vice President of the International Medical Congress that met in Philadelphia, Pennsylvania in 1876 and President of the Wisconsin State Medical Society from 1877 to 1878. He died in 1889.
