= Bill Bartlett (footballer) =

Australian rules footballer, born 1915

Personal information
- Full name: William John Bartlett
- Born: 5 September 1915; Forrest, Victoria
- Died: 6 January 1967 (aged 51); Geelong West, Victoria
- Original team: Geelong West

Playing career^{1}
Years	Club	Games (Goals)
1941	Geelong	4 (0)
- ^{1} Playing statistics correct to the end of 1941.

William John Bartlett (5 September 1915 – 6 January 1967) was an Australian rules footballer who played with Geelong in the Victorian Football League (VFL).

His VFL football career overlapped with his period of service in the Australian Army in World War II, and he later served in the Royal Australian Air Force as well.
