= Ichabod S. Bartlett =

American politician and writer (1838–1925)

Ichabod Sargent Bartlett (February 27, 1838 – January 26, 1925) was a soldier, journalist, miner, writer, and politician in his long lifetime. He was the editor of a lengthy History of Wyoming published in 1918.

== Early life ==
Bartlett was born in Amesbury, Massachusetts, the son of Joseph Bartlett (1802–1871) and his wife Betsey Sargent Bartlett (1805–1874).

== Military and post-war career ==
Bartlett enlisted in the 10th New Hampshire Infantry Regiment in 1862, was quickly promoted to sergeant-major, and was later given a battlefield promotion to lieutenant. After the Civil War ended in 1865 he served in paymaster posts in the Southwest until 1868.

Bartlett returned from the Southwest in 1868 and went into business in Chicago.

== Wyoming career ==
Bartlett came to Wyoming in 1878 to serve as the military storekeeper at Camp Carlin, a large military depot near Cheyenne. He held that post until 1881.

Bartlett then went into mining in the area, locating deposits of iron and opening mines near Hartville. He operated a store in Hartville. He and his sons also operated limestone quarries. Bartlett brought attention to signs of primitive mining in the area, initially attributed to the Spanish but now thought to be the work of ancient Native Americans.

Bartlett served in the Wyoming Territorial House of Representatives representing Laramie County in 1882. He was a Republican candidate for Laramie County commissioner in 1888. In 1891 Bartlett was selected as chief clerk of the House. In 1900 he was serving on the national committee of a faction of the Populist Party. He ran unsuccessfully for the state House as a Democrat in 1902.

From 1906 to 1908 Bartlett was the managing editor of the Cheyenne Leader newspaper. In 1918 Bartlett was the editor of the first volume of a "History of Wyoming".

Bartlett was also involved with the American Humane Society, serving as state chairman in 1915.

== Family ==
Bartlett was probably a descendant of Founding Father Josiah Bartlett (1729–1795).

Bartlett married Mary Submit Clark (born 1840) in 1868; she died on December 2 of the same year. In 1871 he married Mary Jane Eastman (1847–1918), daughter of abolitionist newspaper editor Zebina Eastman (1815–1883). They had at least four children: Edna Sargent Bartlett (1872–1948), Sidney Bartlett (1874–1947), Albert Babbitt Bartlett (1885–1980), and William Bartlett.

Mrs. Bartlett was nominated for U. S. Senate by the Populist members of the Wyoming legislature during the 1893 legislative session and received five votes on a number of ballots; this was the first time a woman had been nominated for the Senate by a party caucus and received votes.
