= Edward Bartlett (disambiguation) =

Edward Bartlett (1836–1908) was an English ornithologist.

Edward Bartlett may also refer to:

- Barto Bartlett (Edward Lawson Bartlett, 1906–1976), West Indian cricketer
- Bob Bartlett (Edward Lewis Bartlett, 1904–1968), U.S. senator from Alaska
  - Statue of Bob Bartlett
- Edward T. Bartlett (1841–1910), New York lawyer
