= Ichabod T. Williams =

American businessman and art collector

Ichabod Thomas Williams (c. 1826 – 1 March 1899) was a prominent American businessman and art collector in the 19th century.

== Life and works ==
Williams was born in New York City. He became an officer in the 27th Regiment, which was the predecessor of the famous 7th Regiment, New York National Guard, and took part in the Astor Place Riot.

He joined the lumber business of Williams & Smith, in which his father was a partner. In 1870 he formed his own company under the name of Ichabod T. Williams. Two sons became partners in 1880 and 1882 (with two more to follow in the early 1890s) and the name became Ichabod T. Williams & Sons. Their sawmill and veneer plant in Carteret, New Jersey, was a leading firm for the manufacture and distribution of fine domesticated and foreign hardwoods. He was for several years President of the Lumber Trade Association. He was a director of the People's Bank and a member of the Manhattan Club.

In his latter years Ichabod T. Williams was an extensive art collector and his collection of paintings of the Barbizon School was one of the largest in New York. It included works by Corot, Diaz, Dupré, Rousseau and Millet. He also possessed an extensive collection of glassware and porcelain. Williams liked to buy paintings directly from the artists and was instrumental in launching the career of American artist Frank Mura.

His son Henry Williams (1859-1944) was also a notable art collector.

The Ichabod T. Williams & Sons lumber and cabinetry company closed in 1972. The plant was documented by the Historic American Engineering Record in 1984 and demolished in 1995.
