= Nicholas Bartlett =

Australian Kendo player

Nicholas Anthony Bartlett
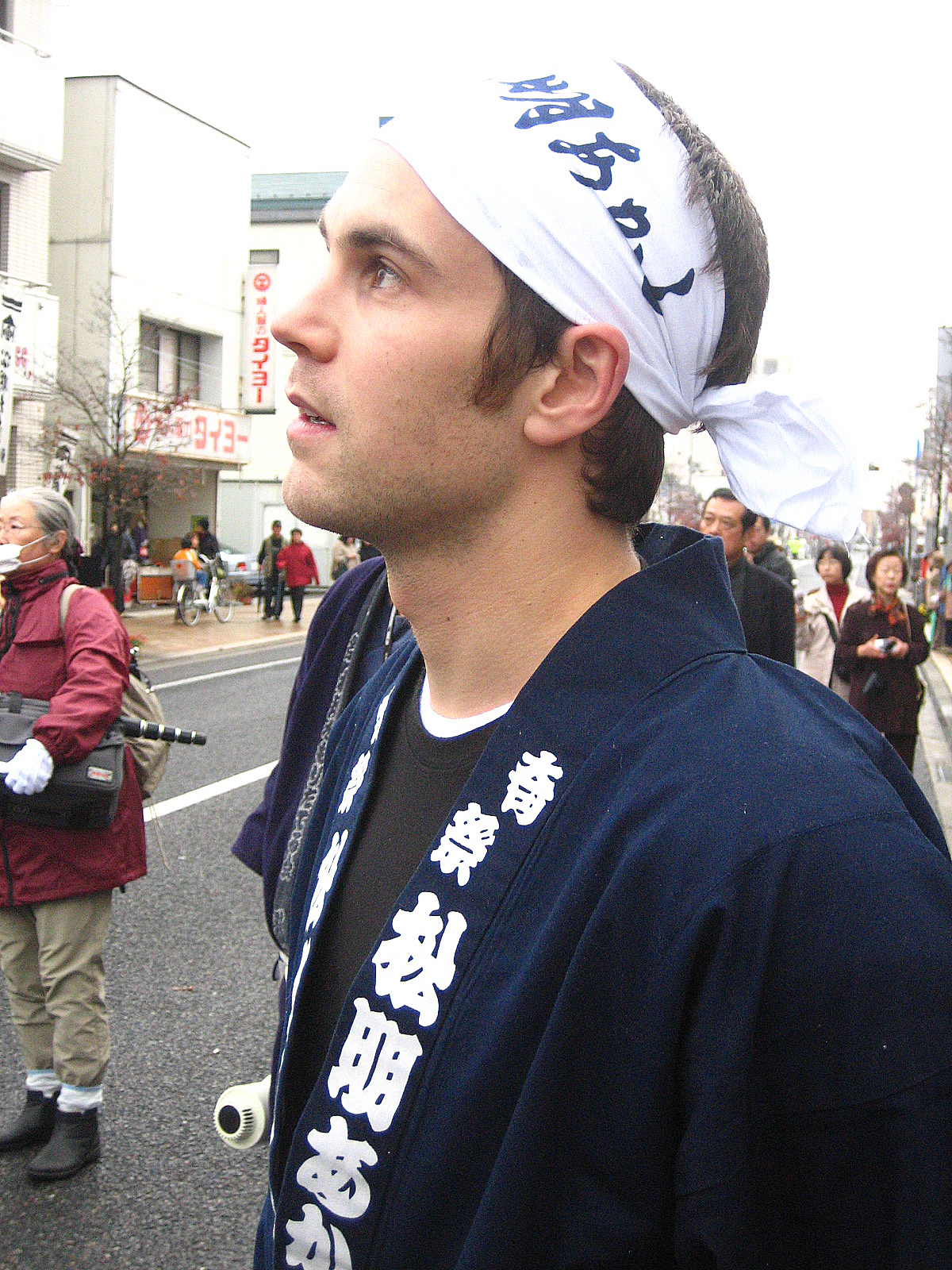
- Nicholas Bartlett at a festival in Sukagawa
- Born: 24 December 1979; Adelaide, Australia
- Height: 177 cm (5 ft 10 in)
- Style: Kendo
- Teachers: Sakai, Yoshiharu
- Rank: rokudan (六段:ろくだん)

Other information
- Notable club: Sukagawa Kendo Renmei Adelaide Kenyukai
- Website: http://www.kendo-fik.org/

Nicholas Bartlett (born 24 December 1979) is an Australian Kendo player.

A 6th-dan black belt, Bartlett represented Queensland winning 1st place in the individual division at the 32nd Australian Kendo Championships in Reservoir, Victoria on 9–10 June 2007.

Nic began studying Kendo in his freshman year at university and after moving to Japan in August 2006 he joined the Sukagawa Kendo Renmei where he was the captain of his kendo club.

Nic represented Australia at the 2009 World Kendo Championships in São Paulo, Brazil. He currently resides in Australia where he continues to teach and practice kendo locally.

== See also ==
- Kendo
- Martial arts
