= Burns Tracy Walling =

US Naval Officer

Burns Tracy Wallin
- Born: February 4, 1855; Coshocton, Ohio, US
- Died: May 12, 1938 (aged 83); Los Angeles, California, US
- Burial place: Arlington National Cemetery
- Military career
- Allegiance: United States of America
- Branch: United States Navy
- Service years: 1876–1911; 1917–1919
- Rank: Commodore
- Commands: U.S. Naval Station, Culebra, Puerto Rico, and commanding officer; USS Gloucester and; USS Alliance; USS Birmingham; Naval Station, San Juan, Puerto Rico
- Conflicts: Spanish–American War

Burns Tracy Walling (February 4, 1855 – May 12, 1938) served as a United States Navy officer from June 20, 1876, to June 30, 1911. During and immediately after World War I (1917–1918) he served as Inspector of Engineering and Ordnance Material in Boston, Massachusetts.

After serving in several assignments, including conduct of a hydrographic survey of the Pacific Coast of Mexico and Central America, Walling served as an instructor in the department of physics and chemistry at the United States Naval Academy from December 1886 until September 1892. He was inspector of ordnance and equipment for the reconstruction of three Spanish Navy gunboats raised by Admiral George Dewey after the Battle of Manila Bay during the Spanish–American War. In May 1904, Walling began duty as commandant of U. S. Naval Station Culebra, Puerto Rico. He was the first commanding officer of the scout cruiser USS Birmingham from April 11, 1908, to May 9, 1909, and Captain of the Yard at Naval Station New York from May 9, 1909, to October 28, 1909. Just before his retirement, from August 6, 1910, to June 30, 1911, he commanded Naval Station San Juan, Puerto Rico. He retired at the rank of commodore on June 30, 1911.

When President Woodrow Wilson requested that a Joint session of the United States Congress declare war on the German Empire and Congress approved the declaration on April 2, 1917, bringing the United States into World War I, Walling returned to duty as Inspector of Engineering and Ordnance Material at Boston, Massachusetts until November 18, 1919. He was relieved of all duty and returned to retirement on November 20, 1920.

== Early life ==
Burns Tracy Walling was born February 4, 1855, at Coshocton, Ohio. His parents were Ansel Tracy Walling, a doctor, printer, newspaperman, lawyer, Ohio state legislator, and one-term member of the United States House of Representatives from Ohio (March 4, 1875 – March 3, 1877), and Sarah Ellen Burns Walling. In 1863, the family relocated to Circleville, Ohio. Walling graduated from the United States Naval Academy in June 1876, ranked fourth in a class of 42 midshipmen.

== U.S. Navy assignments ==
=== 1876–1898 ===
After graduation from the U.S. Naval Academy, Midshipman Walling was assigned in December 1876 to the newly commissioned screw sloop-of-war USS Vandalia, stationed in European Squadron in the Mediterranean Sea. He was promoted to the grade of ensign in September 1877. He remained on Vandalia until the ship arrived in Boston, Massachusetts, in January 1879.

Walling was assigned to the sidewheel steam frigate USS Powhatan, which was the flagship of the North Atlantic Squadron, from June 1879 until June 1881. In November 1881, he was assigned to the gunboat USS Ranger in the Pacific Squadron. On Ranger, he worked on the hydrographic survey of the Pacific coast of Mexico and Central America between Mazatlan, Mexico, and Panama (then a part of Colombia). In September 1884, he was promoted to the grade of lieutenant, junior grade.

From February 1885 to March 1886, Walling was assigned to the receiving ship USS Vermont at the New York Navy Yard in Brooklyn, New York, for recruiting duty. In April 1886, he was assigned to the United States Coast and Geodetic Survey schooner Scoresby. On Scoresby, he was senior assistant for the survey of natural oyster beds and instruction in oyster culture for the State of North Carolina.

From September 1886 to June 1887, Walling served on the steam sloop-of-war USS Essex, which was sent to the Asiatic Squadron. In June 1887, he joined the steam sloop-of-war USS Brooklyn, flagship of the Asiatic Squadron, aboard which he served until August 1888, when he was transferred back to Essex, which returned to New York City in April 1889. In August 1889, Walling was again ordered to recruiting duty on Vermont at the New York Navy Yard.

From December 1886 until September 1892, Walling was an instructor in the department of physics and chemistry at the U. S. Naval Academy. In March 1890, he was promoted to the grade of lieutenant. In September 1892, he was assigned for instruction to the United States Naval War College at Newport, Rhode Island.

In December 1892, Walling joined the steam sloop-of-war USS Kearsarge, which had sunk the Confederate States Navy cruiser CSS Alabama at the Battle of Cherbourg off Cherbourg, France, during the American Civil War on June 19, 1864. He was detached for automobile torpedo instruction at the Naval War College at Newport in July 1893. He returned to Kearsarge in August 1893. On February 2, 1894, Walling was aboard Kearsarge along with 202 other officers and men, including the admiral commanding the North Atlantic Squadron, when the ship was wrecked on Roncador Cay in the western Caribbean Sea off Venezuela. In April 1895, he was assigned to the protected cruiser USS Atlanta in the North Atlantic Squadron, and served aboard her until she was decommissioned in September 1895.

In November 1895, Walling again was assigned to the receiving ship Vermont for recruiting duty. In September 1896, he was detached for duty as electrical assistant in the equipment department of the New York Navy Yard.

In September 1897, Walling was ordered to serve as navigator of the gunboat USS Wheeling off Alaska in the Pacific Squadron. He was hospitalized in April 1898. In September 1898, he was again assigned as electrical assistant in the equipment department at the New York Navy Yard.

=== Aftermath of the Spanish–American War ===
In the aftermath of the Spanish-American War of April-August 1898, Walling was promoted to lieutenant commander in March 1899. In June 1899, he took a detachment of officers and men on board the hospital ship USS Solace for duty in the Philippine Islands, which the United States had seized from Spain during the war. Upon arriving at Manila in August 1899, Walling was sent to Hong Kong by the commander-in-chief of the Asiatic Squadron to serve as inspector of ordnance and equipment for the reconstruction of the three Spanish Navy gunboats raised by Admiral George Dewey after the Battle of Manila Bay during the war. In March 1900, Walling was ordered to U.S. Naval Station Cavite at Cavite on Luzon in the Philippines to organize the equipment department and construct shops at that station.

=== Later commands and assignments ===
After returning to the United States from the Philippines in June 1901, Walling served as executive officer on the protected cruiser USS Albany in the European Squadron in the Mediterranean Sea. He returned to the United States in July 1902. In August 1902, he became general assistant in the equipment department of the New York Navy Yard.

In May 1904, Walling began duty as commandant of the U. S. Naval Station, Culebra, Puerto Rico, and as commanding officer of the gunboats USS Gloucester and USS Alliance. In December 1905, he was promoted to commander.

In December 1906, Walling became equipment officer of the New York Navy Yard and general inspector for the Bureau of Equipment of the United States Department of the Navy in Washington, D.C., for ships under construction at private shipyards on the United States East Coast. He was the first commanding officer of the scout cruiser USS Birmingham from April 11, 1908, to May 9, 1909. He was Captain of the Yard at Naval Station New York from May 9, 1909, to October 28, 1909, and from August 6, 1910, until his retirement on June 11, 1911, he was commandant of Naval Station, San Juan, Puerto Rico.

Walling retired on June 30, 1911, at the grade of commodore.

=== World War I ===
At the outset of U.S. involvement in World War I on April 2, 1917, Walling returned to duty as Inspector of Engineering and Ordnance Material at Boston, Massachusetts until November 18, 1919. He was relieved of all duty on November 20, 1920.

== Author ==
In 1907, Walling wrote the manual Electrical Installations of the United States Navy.

== Personal life ==
Walling was married on October 27, 1892, to Wilhelmina Boyd, daughter of a U. S. Navy captain, at Grace Church in Brooklyn, New York. The Wallings had two daughters, Grace, who married U.S. Navy Commander James Sutherland Spore, and a younger sister, Bernice.

== Death ==
Walling died on May 12, 1938, at Los Angeles, California. He is buried in Arlington National Cemetery in Arlington, Virginia.
