= Neil Bartlett =

Neil Bartlett may refer to:

- Neil Bartlett (chemist) (1932–2008), chemist who synthesized the first noble-gas compounds
- Neil Bartlett (playwright) (born 1958), award-winning British director, performer, translator, and writer

== See also ==
- Neal Bartlett (born 1975), English footballer
