= Louis Bartlett =

Mayor of Berkeley, California

Louis De Fontenay. Bartlett (1873–1951) was an attorney and Mayor of Berkeley, California, from 1919 to 1923.

Bartlett was noted for his work to promote public utilities, especially water and power.

Louis Bartlett was born in San Francisco on September 20, 1872, the son of Columbus Bartlett and Louise Mel de Fontenay. He was married June 13, 1903, to Mary Olney, daughter of Warren Olney and Mary Craven. The Bartletts had three daughters: Mary, Muriel, and Ruth. Bartlett died February 4, 1951, in San Francisco. Mary Olney died in 1948. Louis married Natalie Varty May 10, 1957.
