= Dana W. Bartlett =

American Congregationalist minister and writer

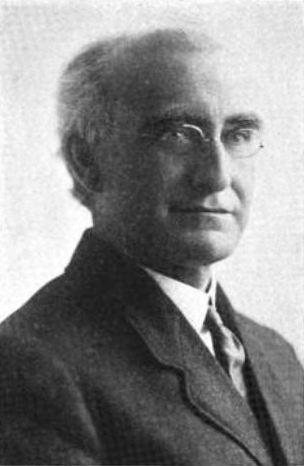
- Born: Dana Webster Bartlett; October 27, 1860; Bangor, Maine
- Died: July 16, 1942 (aged 81); Los Angeles, California
- Education: Iowa College; Yale University; Chicago Theological Seminary
- Occupations: Clergyman, writer

Dana Webster Bartlett (October 27, 1860 – July 16, 1942) was an American Congregationalist minister, settlement house director, and writer. He was an early advocate of the City Beautiful movement.

== Biography ==
He was born in Bangor, Maine, and educated at Iowa College in Grinnell, Iowa through 1882. He also attended Yale University and Chicago Theological Seminary. He was pastor of Phillips Church, Salt Lake City. He moved to Los Angeles in 1896 to manage the Bethlehem Institute, also called the Bethlehem Institutional Church. The Institute was a non-denominational social, educational and social service center for working-class and immigrant people which covered six city lots. He ministered reached to Chinese, Japanese, and the Brotherhood of Spiritual Christians from Russia. He influenced social work education and research, helping organize field research by students from the University of Southern California and Occidental College who would visit the slums of Los Angeles and write up their findings. He is one of the honorees in the California Social Work Hall of Distinction. A Progressive, he campaigned for public baths, social reforms, and workers' rights to organize. Bartlett died in Los Angeles.

== Works ==
- The Better City: A Sociological Study of a Modern City (Los Angeles: Neuner Company Press, 1907)
- The Better Country (Boston: C.M. Clark, 1911)
- The Bush Aflame (Los Angeles: Grafton Publishing, 1923)
- Our Government in Social Service, or a Nation at Work in Human Uplift
