= William Bartlett Fletcher Sr. =

Rear Admiral in the United States Navy

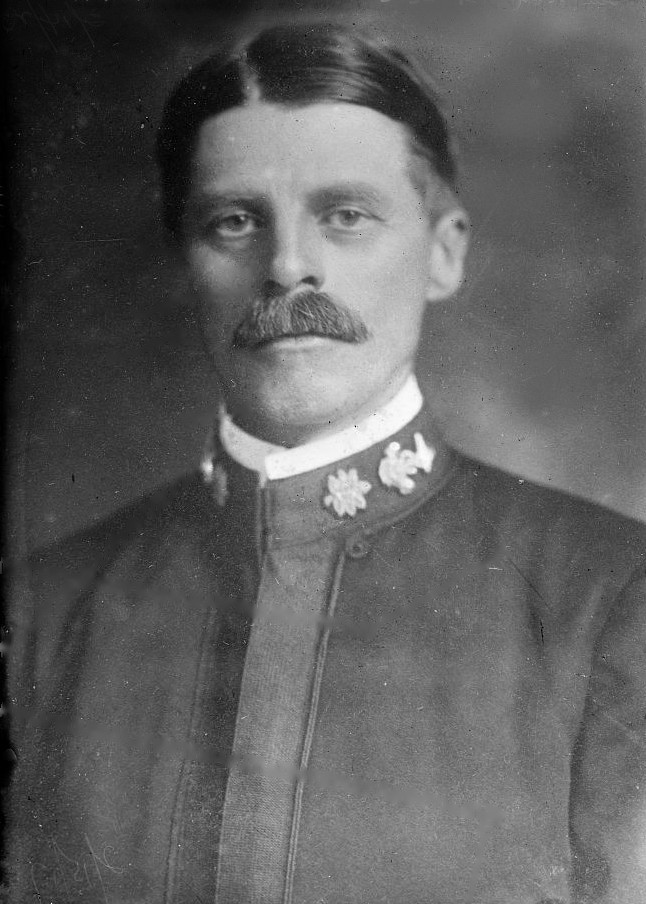

William Bartlett Fletcher Sr. (1862 – June 29, 1957) was a Rear Admiral in the United States Navy.

== Biography ==
He was born in 1862. He had a son, William Bartlett Fletcher Jr. (1900–1980). Fletcher Jr. was active during World War II, noted for his command of USS Neches (AO-5).

He took over command of the USS Birmingham from Captain Burns Tracy Walling, the ship's first commander on October 28, 1909, and served till 1910.

He died on June 29, 1957, at the Naval Hospital in St. Albans, Queens, New York City.
