= William Bartlet =

English minister

William Bartlet (died 1682), was an English independent minister.

== Life ==
Bartlet was educated at New Inn Hall, Oxford, was found officiating to a congregation at Wapping in 1647, and was lecturer at Bideford two years later. He was one of the commissioners for Devonshire; was ejected from Bideford 1662; was once imprisoned; and died in 1682.

== Works ==
- Ichnographia, or a Model of the Primitive Congregational Way, apparently an attempt to recover the order of divine service amongst the primitive Christians for imitation by the moderns, published in London, 1647, 4to.
- Sovereign Balsam; gently applied in a few weighty considerations (by way of Query) for healing the distempers of such professors of religion as Satan hath wounded and drawn aside (under the notion of living in God) to the utter renouncing and casting off the use of Divine Ordinances and Gospel Instruments of Worship, London, 1649, 4to, a work directed against some sect of fanatics who believed they had reached a state of perfect sinlessness.

Bartlet enumerates thirty-two of their tenets, of which the following two may serve as specimens: "That they cannot join in prayer with others because of confession of wants, sins, drawing near to God, and petitions for the Lord's presence, giving out of help, &c., with which they cannot close because of denying the first and enjoying the latter", and "that a saint may outlive all his religion, all ties upon his conscience, and yet remain a saint."
