= William Bartlett Dalby =

Sir William Bartlett Dalby FRCS
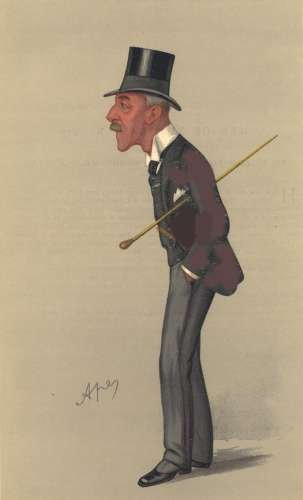
- 1888 Vanity Fair caricature by Spy
- Born: 10 December 1840; Ashby-de-la-Zouch
- Died: 29 December 1918 (aged 78); London
- Occupations: Aural surgeon and otologist
- Known for: Lectures on Diseases and Injuries of the Ear

Sir William Bartlett Dalby FRCS (1840 - 1918) was a British aural surgeon and otologist, who was knighted in 1886 and made a Fellow of the Royal College of Surgeons in 1870.

After being educated at Sidney Sussex College, Cambridge, Dalby became consulting ear surgeon to St George's Hospital. In 1894–1895 he was president of the Medical Society. He was in 1899–1901 the first president of the Otological Society of the United Kingdom, which in 1907 amalgamated with the Royal Society of Medicine to became the Section of Otology.

Sir William Dalby retired from medical practice at the age of 60 and died at his London residence on 29 December 1918; he was survived by his wife, Hyacinthe Wellesley, one son, and three daughters, after his eldest son died in a boating accident and his younger son was wounded in the First World War.

His great-granddaughter was the English novelist Mary Wesley.
