= Josiah Bartlett =

American Founding Father, physician, and judge

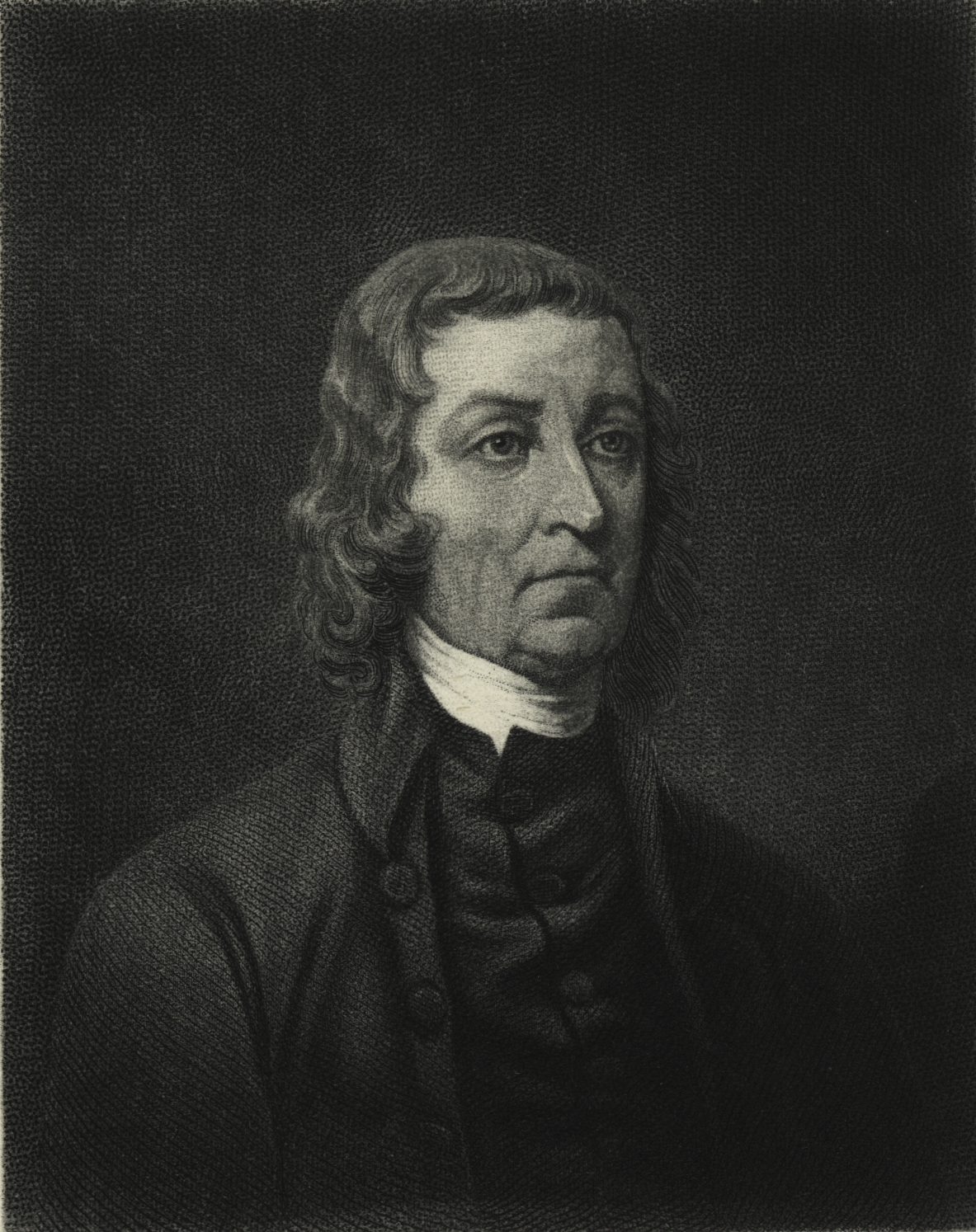
- Engraving, c. 1776

4th Governor of New Hampshire
- In office June 5, 1790 – June 5, 1794
- Preceded by: President of New Hampshire
- Succeeded by: John Taylor Gilman

Chief Justice of the New Hampshire Superior Court of Judicature
- In office 1788–1790

Delegate to the Continental Congress from New Hampshire
- In office 1778–1778
- In office 1775–1776

Personal details
- Born: November 21, 1729 Amesbury, Province of Massachusetts Bay, British America
- Died: May 19, 1795 (aged 65) Kingston, New Hampshire, U.S.
- Party: Democratic-Republican
- Spouse: Mary Bartlett
- Children: 10, including Josiah Bartlett Jr.
- Relatives: Luella J. B. Case (granddaughter)

Josiah Bartlett (December 2, 1729 [O.S. November 21, 1729] (Note: November 21, 1729 in the Julian calendar is December 2, 1729 in the Gregorian calendar. Josiah Bartlett was born before Britain and the British Empire (including colonial America) switched from the Julian calendar to the Gregorian calendar in 1752.) – May 19, 1795) was an American Founding Father, physician, statesman, a delegate to the Continental Congress for New Hampshire, and a signatory to the Declaration of Independence and Articles of Confederation. He was a member of the convention which framed the Constitution of the United States in 1787. He served as the fourth governor of New Hampshire and chief justice of the New Hampshire Superior Court of Judicature, now the New Hampshire Supreme Court.

Bartlett practiced medicine over 40 years. During that time, he promoted wellness practices, including diet, exercise, fresh air, and a contented mind. He fostered using messages from one's body to improve one's health, like drinking when thirsty and covering up when sick with chills. He managed an outbreak of throat distemper, or diphtheria, with Peruvian bark, also known as quinine, with much greater success than traditional treatments. When he was very sick himself, he took cold cider, versus a warm drink, at intervals to break a fever.

As governor, Bartlett worked to ensure the state's success by supporting farming and businesses, improving the state's infrastructure, codifying and enacting laws, adding special judges, and paying off the state's debt. He ran a farm and orchards over his life. His wife Mary Bartlett took on that responsibility when Bartlett was away at the Continental Congress in Pennsylvania. Bartlett and his wife wrote letters to one another that provide insight into the life of a founding father, the trials they experienced and conquered as they fought for a country independent from British rule, and their strength in creating a stable life for themselves and their twelve children, eight of whom survived into adulthood.

== Personal life ==
Josiah Bartlett, born on November 21, 1729, in Amesbury, in the Province of Massachusetts Bay, was the seventh and last child of Hannah (née Webster) and Stephen Bartlett, a shoemaker. Bartlett had some education from the town schoolmaster and possibly circuit schools. He learned Latin and Greek, most likely from a relative, Reverend Doctor John Webster. In 1745, Bartlett studied medicine in his hometown under Dr. Nehemiah Ordway, a relative. (Note: The biography for Bartlett's papers states that Bartlett began his apprenticeship in 1745 and "about 1747".) (Note: Dr. Ordway married the widow, Tirzah Titcomb Bartlett, of his Uncle Thomas Bartlett.) He also studied from Ordway's and other physicians' medical books. After a five-year apprenticeship, he moved to Kingston, New Hampshire in 1750, where he lived with Reverend Joseph Secombe. One year later, he purchased twelve acres for a farm.

On January 15, 1754, he married Mary Bartlett of Newton, New Hampshire. She was his cousin, the daughter of his uncle, Deacon Joseph Bartlett and Sarah (née Hoyt) Bartlett. The Bartletts had twelve children, eight who lived to adulthood. They were: Mary (1754), Lois (1756), Miriam (1758), Rhoda (1760), Levi (1763), Josiah (1768), Ezra (1770), and Sarah (1773). (Note: Barthelmas has different years of birth for two of the children: Ezra (1760) and Josiah (1765).) All three of his sons and seven of his grandsons would follow his dream as physicians.

Bartlett was a freemason and encouraged his son Josiah to join. (Note: Although his lodge is not known, his great-grandson, Levi S. Bartlett, had a letter written by Josiah to his son Ezra saying, "I attended a Mason meeting last night, and as soon as you can I wish you would join the Masons.") Bartlett and Mary remained married until her death on July 14, 1789.

== Career ==
=== Medicine ===
Coat of Arms of Josiah Bartlett

In 1750, he moved to Kingston, New Hampshire, in Rockingham County, and opened his medical practice. Kingston at that time was a frontier settlement.

Bartlett actively practiced medicine for 40 years. During that time, he tested both traditional and new treatments for optimal efficacy. A virulent form of throat distemper or diphtheria, with a fever and canker, spread throughout Kingston in 1754. Bartlett experimented with therapy using several available drugs and empirically discovered that Peruvian bark, also known as quinine, relieved symptoms long enough to allow recovery. He also realized the benefits of curing fevers with cool liquids, like apple cider, taken at intervals. He tried this when he was quite ill, against his physician's orders, with success. Beginning June 25, 1765, Bartlett and Dr. Amos Gale were partners in a medical practice in Kingston for a period of three years.

Bartlett believed in fostering wellness, including exercise, diet, fresh air, and following cues of one's body, like drinking when thirsty and covering up when sick with the chills. He also believed "to keep the mind as Easy and Contented as possible" were "of much more Service than a multiplicity of Medicines".

In 1790, Bartlett secured legislation recognizing the New Hampshire Medical Society. He was elected chief executive of New Hampshire, serving as president in 1791 and 1792. In 1790, he delivered the commencement address at Dartmouth College when his son Ezra graduated. Bartlett was awarded an honorary Doctorate of Medicine the same day his son was awarded the same degree.

=== Farming and real estate ===
While in Kingston, Bartlett grew crops on his twelve-acre farm beginning in 1751. As a young adult, he also made money dealing in lumber and buying and selling real estate. After he was married, the Bartletts planted and harvested crops, like corn and beans, through the labor of those they enslaved. They had an orchard with peach, apple, plum, and cherry trees.

=== Politics ===
Bartlett became active in the political affairs of Kingston, and in 1765, he was elected to the Provincial Assembly. Bartlett conducted discussions with Colonial Governor Benning Wentworth (1741–1766) and the Provincial Assembly to mediate dissension caused by the Stamp Act of 1765 (enacted by the Parliament of Great Britain). He opposed the Townshend Acts of 1767 and 1768 and aligned politically with the patriots, or Whigs. Bartlett was member of the colonial legislature until 1775.

While a legislator, Bartlett was at odds with both Governor Wentworths, Benning and John, who endorsed the Kingdom of Great Britain's agenda over the needs of the people of New Hampshire. In an unsuccessful attempt to influence Bartlett, Governor Benning Wentworth appointed him as justice of the peace in 1765. Two years later, Colonial Governor John Wentworth (1767–1775) did the same. Bartlett organized the 7th Regiment of the New Hampshire Milition and in 1770, he was a colonel of the militia.

Wanting independence from the Kingdom of Great Britain, Bartlett participated in revolutionary causes beginning in 1774. He joined the Provincial Assembly's Committee of Correspondence and the Committee of Safety in May. In response, the governor immediately dissolved the Provincial Assembly, which resulted in the termination of the royal government in New Hampshire. A temporary government was organized with the Provincial Congress, when that assembly was not in session, the Committee of Safety took the lead. Bartlett retained his seat in the Assembly. The Committee of Correspondence reassembled the representatives and selected delegates to the upcoming Continental Congress.

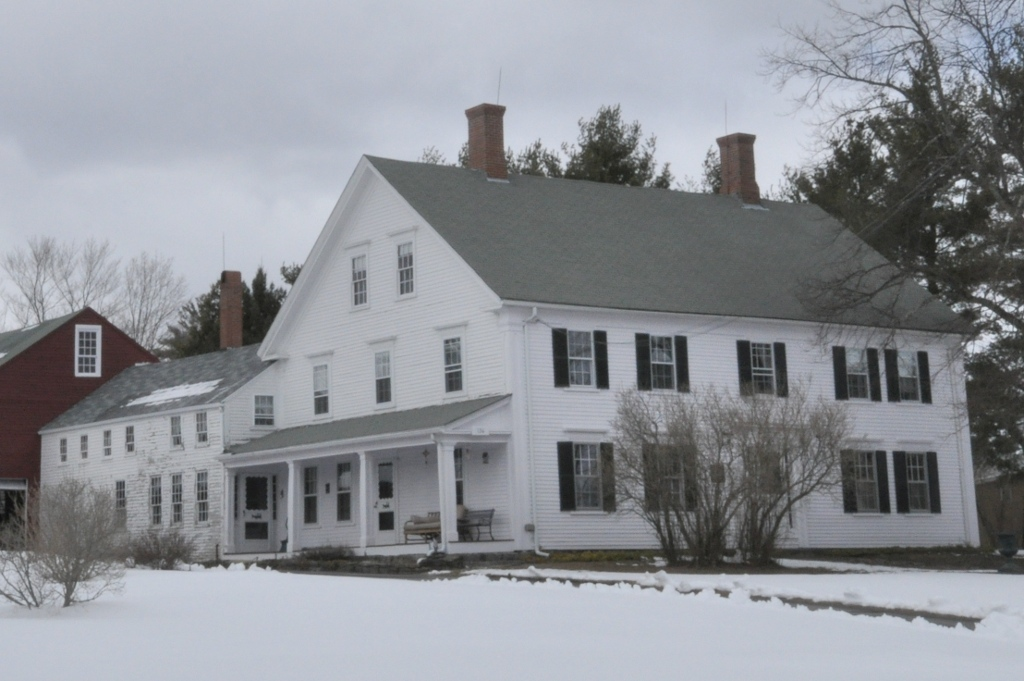
Josiah Bartlett House in Kingston, New Hampshire, a National Historic Landmark listing, built in 1774

Also in May, his house was burned down, likely by Tories. Bartlett was chosen to represent New Hampshire at the First Continental Congress (September 5 to October 26, 1774), but declined because his house was razed. He moved his family out to the farmhouse and began rebuilding immediately. The Josiah Bartlett House was declared a National Historic Landmark in 1971.

He was named an "accessory after the fact" for the Capture of Fort William and Mary (December 14, 1774) in New Castle, New Hampshire. Governor Wentworth dismissed him from his positions as a justice of the peace and militia colonel in February 1775.

=== Founding Father and military leader ===
Bartlett was a member of the Continental Congress in 1775, 1776 and 1778. He was selected as a delegate in 1775, and attended the Second Session of the Continental Congress where he sat on the civil government, secrecy, safety, marine, and munitions Committees.

When the question of declaring independence from Great Britain was officially brought up in 1776, as a representative of the northernmost colony Bartlett was the first to be asked, and he answered in the affirmative. He was the second signer of the Declaration of Independence (July 4, 1776). He signed the engrossed copy on August 2, 1776.

After asking for relief, a couple of men from New Hampshire joined the delegation and that allowed Bartlett to return to New Hampshire in 1777. Bartlett organized regiments to respond to an anticipated threat from Montreal. He led the troops with supplies to Bennington, New Hampshire to join up with Gen. John Stark's forces. He brought medical supplies that were needed for the Battle of Bennington (August 16, 1777). In 1779, Bartlett was made a colonel in the militia.

Bartlett was reelected to the Continental Congress on March 14, 1778, and returned to Pennsylvania by May 21, 1778. He served on the committee that drafted the Articles of Confederation and he signed the instrument. Bartlett withdrew his seat on October 31, 1778, to return to New Hampshire to attend to personal business.

While he was away from home, his wife Mary, pregnant part of that time, had managed the planting and harvesting of crops, cared for their large family, and oversaw the servants' work.

Bartlett and Mary wrote letters to one another that provide insight into their lives during the revolution. Pauline Maier in The old revolutionaries : political lives in the age of Samuel Adams states: "In the midst of change, some revolutionaries cultivated continuity. For Josiah and Mary Bartlett, the permanent alterations the Revolution brought to them and their provincial world were grafted upon a larger field of stability. Josiah might help design a national government that would determine the happiness of all future generations, but the seasons would come as always, the drought and worms at most a little earlier, a little later; and even the failure of the Revolution would have been, it seemed, but another of the troubles that marked men's existence and for which Providence would again somehow provide."

=== Later career ===
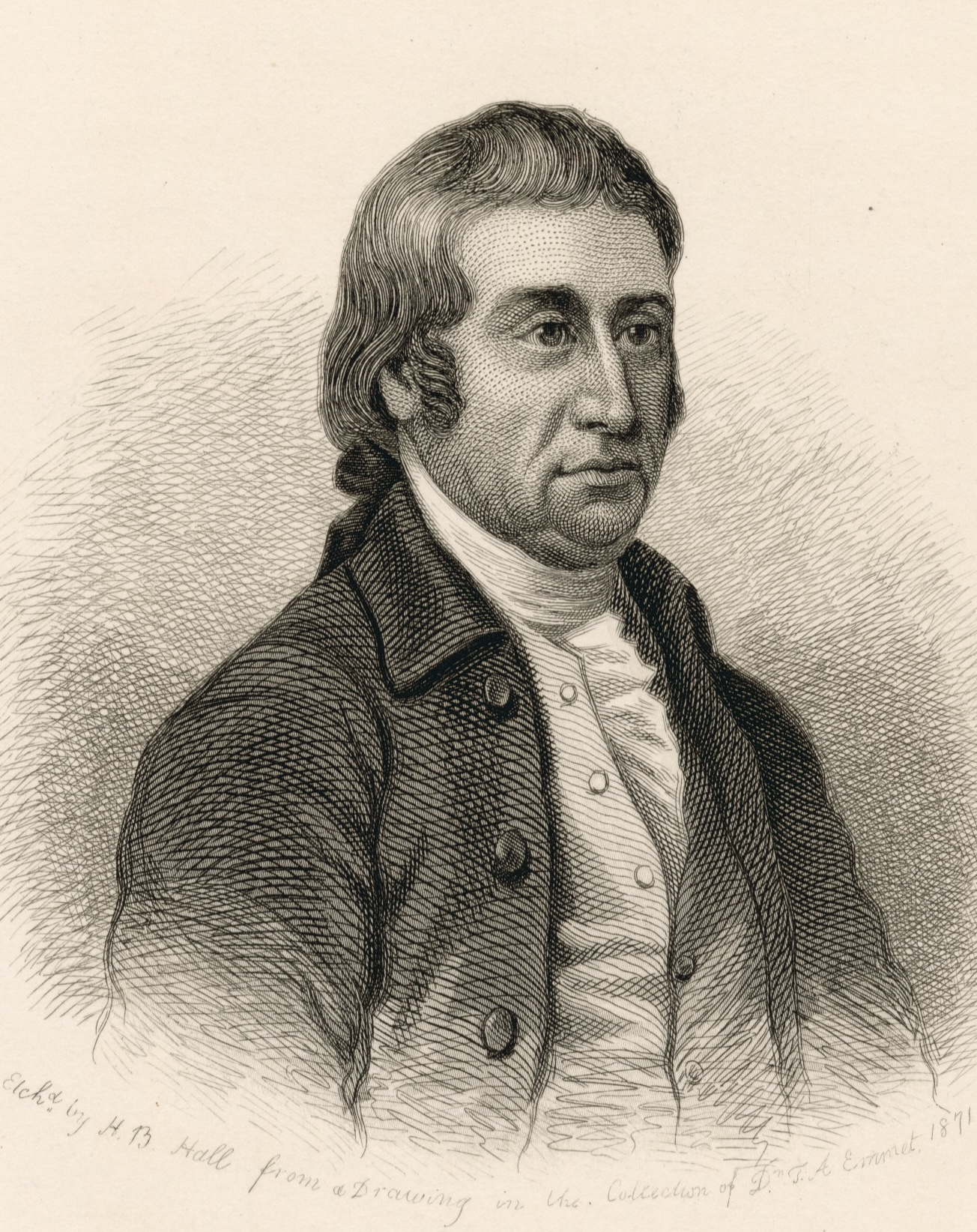
Josiah Bartlett

He became chief justice of the Court of Common Pleas in 1778. In 1779, he returned to his role as a judge, serving in the Court of Common Pleas until 1782 when he became associate justice for the New Hampshire Supreme Court. (Note: The biography by Congress states that in 1784, he was appointed justice to the New Hampshire Supreme Court.)

Bartlett was a delegate from New Hampshire at the convention that framed the Constitution of the United States in 1787. He argued for ratification, which took place on June 21, 1788. New Hampshire was the ninth state to ratify the Constitution.

In 1788, Bartlett was made the chief justice of the state supreme court. The legislature of the new state of New Hampshire selected him to be a U. S. Senator in 1789, but he declined the office. He resigned as chief justice that year. He was also a candidate in that year's gubernatorial election, finishing a distant third behind John Sullivan and incumbent Acting President John Pickering.

Bartlett was governor of New Hampshire from 1790, initially called chief executive or president. When the amended state constitution of 1792 took effect in 1793, his title became governor. He resigned on January 29, 1794, because of declining health. During his tenure, Bartlett developed the foundation for New Hampshire to operate successfully as a state by evaluating existing laws and making new ones, regulating the use of gold and silver coins, establishing special judges, and working with the legislature. He made provisions for payment of the state's debt. He also improved New Hampshire's infrastructure, maintaining and building roads, bridges, and canals. For the state's economy, he supported agriculture and businesses.

== Death and legacy ==
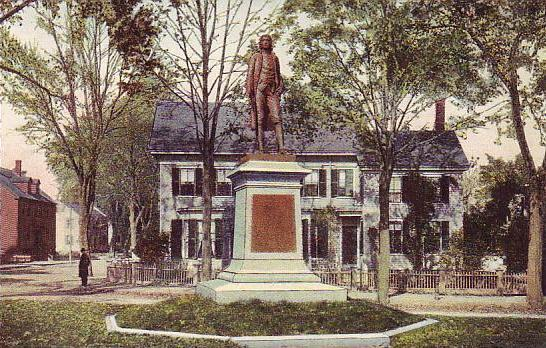
Statue of Josiah Bartlett, near the corner of Main and Heritage Vale Streets, Amesbury, Massachusetts.

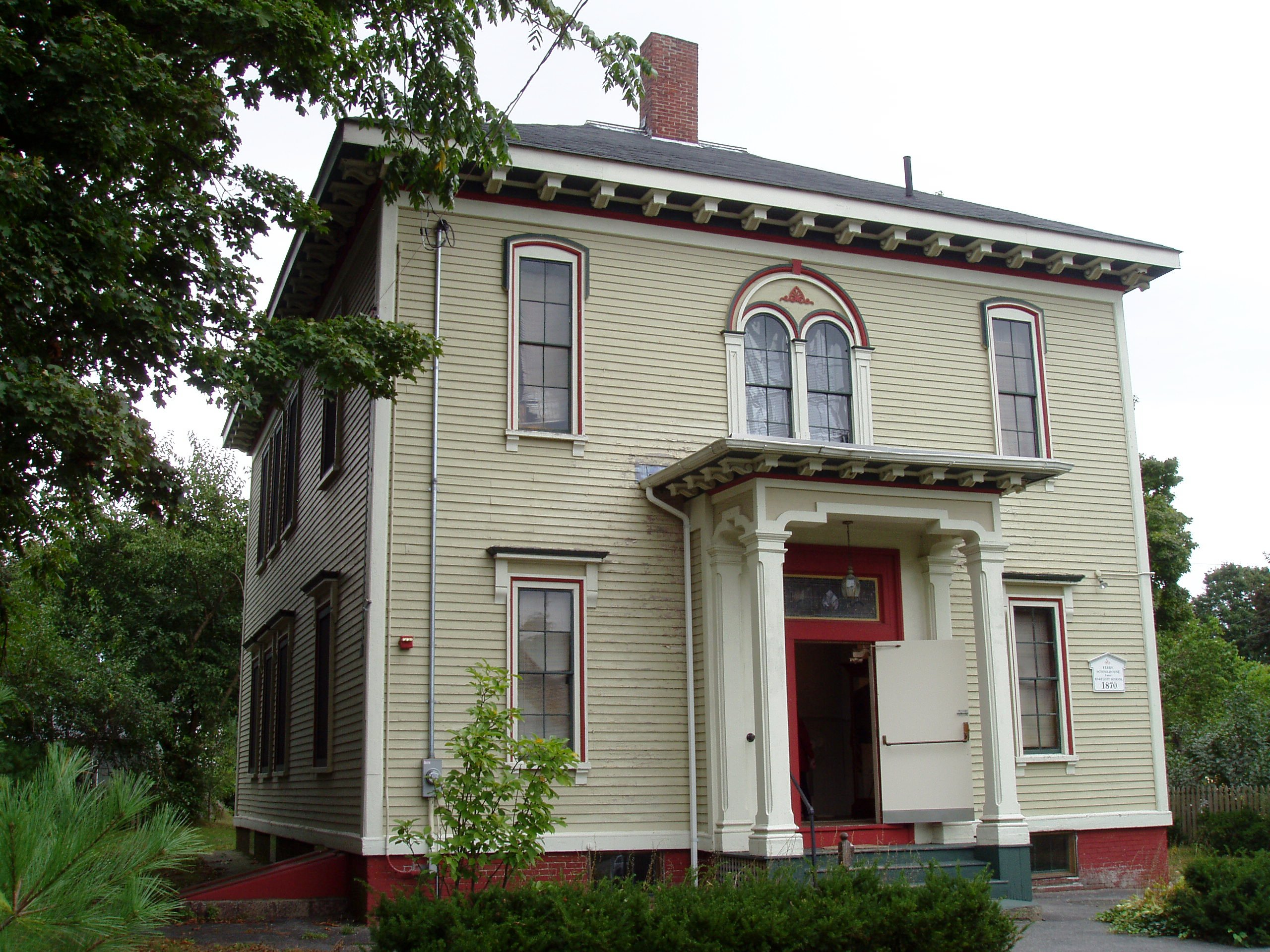
Bartlett Museum, Inc. in Amesbury, Massachusetts

Bartlett retired to his home in Kingston and died there on May 19, 1795. The cause of death was paralysis. He is buried next to his wife Mary in the Plains Cemetery, behind the First Universalist Church in Kingston. Seven-inch medallions located at Bartlett and his wife's graves were awarded by the Daughters of the American Revolution and the Sons of the American Revolution.

A bronze statue of Bartlett stands in the town square of Amesbury, Massachusetts. His portrait hangs in the State House in Concord, New Hampshire, drawn from an original by John Trumbull. Bartlett, New Hampshire, is named in his honor, along with the Josiah Bartlett Elementary School. Bartlett is featured on a New Hampshire historical marker (number 46) along New Hampshire Route 111 in Kingston. The Bartlett School in Amesbury, which operated from 1870 until 1968, operates since then as the Bartlett Museum, Inc., a nonprofit museum.

The 1888 poem "One of the Signers" was written by John Greenleaf Whittier to honor Bartlett.

The main character in the 1999 to 2006 NBC drama series The West Wing, President Josiah Bartlet, is a fictional character depicted as a descendant of the Declaration of Independence signatory.

== See also ==
- Memorial to the 56 Signers of the Declaration of Independence

== Bibliography ==
- Bartlett, Josiah (1979). The papers of Josiah Bartlett. Hanover, New Hampshire: Published for the New Hampshire Historical Society by the University Press of New England. ISBN 978-0-87451-168-0.
- Barthelmas, Della Gray (1997). The signers of the Declaration of Independence. McFarland. ISBN 978-0-7864-0318-9.
- Goodrich, Charles A. (1841). Lives of the signers to the Declaration of independence. Hartford: R. G. H. Huntington. pp. 131–138.
- Green, Harry Clinton; Green, Mary Wolcott (1912). Pioneer Mothers of America. G. P. Putnam's Sons. p. 452. (2007 Library Reprints, Inc. edition ISBN 978-0-7222-8426-1.)
- Maier, Pauline (1982). The old revolutionaries : political lives in the age of Samuel Adams. New York: Vintage Books. ISBN 978-0-394-75073-6.
- McGee, Dorothy Horton (1955). Famous signers of the Declaration; with photographic illus. New York: Dodd, Mead.
- Roberts, Cokie (2005). Founding Mothers : The women who raised our nation. New York: Perennial. ISBN 978-0-06-009026-5.

Political offices
Preceded by John Sullivan	Governor of New Hampshire; 1790–1794	Succeeded by John Taylor Gilman
