= Real West (magazine) =

- Categories: Western
- First issue: 1957; 69 years ago
- Final issue Number: 1988; 38 years ago 266
- Country: United States
- Based in: Connecticut
- ISSN: 0034-0898

Real West was a Western magazine which published nonfiction stories of the Old West.

The Connecticut-based magazine published 266 issues between 1957 and 1988. The magazine was considered one of the least trustworthy of its genre among fans, publishing stories of questionable accuracy accompanied by misattributed photos. Despite its reputation, the sensational stories were popular enough that the magazine operated for 31 years, finally shutting down in 1989 due to falling circulation and rising publishing costs.
