= John Bartlet (divine) =

English nonconformist divine

John Bartlet (fl. 1662), was an English nonconformist divine.

Bartlet was educated at Magdalene College, Cambridge, where he enjoyed the friendship of Richard Sibbes. The authorities are divided as to whether he was the father or the brother of William Bartlet of Bideford. He appears to have been of a somewhat morbid habit of mind, as he is said to have been compelled to abandon the study of anatomy, in which he engaged while at Cambridge, owing to a monomaniacal aversion to food, induced by familiarity with the internal structure of the human gullet.

Having entered the church he obtained the living of St. Thomas's, Exeter, being then in high favour with Bishop Hall. Subsequently, he was collated to the rectory of St. Mary Major in the same city, which he retained until 1662, when he was deprived for nonconformity. Notwithstanding his ejectment, he continued to reside in Exeter, preaching as he found opportunity. He died in extreme old age, at what precise date is not known. He was a conscientious and laborious preacher, and the author of some works of a devotional and doctrinal character. His chief books are entitled: ‘A Summary View of the chief Heads of practical Divinity,’ 8vo, 1670, and ‘Directions for right receiving the Lord's Supper,’ 8vo, 1679.
