= John Bartlet (composer) =

English composer

John Bartlet, also John Bartlett, (fl. 1606–1610) was an English Renaissance composer. He was employed as a musician by Sir Edward Seymour, Earl Hertford (1539–1621) and accompanied him on a diplomatic visit to Brussels in 1605.

Bartlet's only publication was A Booke of Ayres with a Triplicitie of Musicke, published in 1606. He describes himself as a "Gentleman and Practitioner in this art," claiming a connection to a coat of arms. The works of the first part are for four voices accompanied by lute or orpharion and viola da gamba (the lute part mostly doubles the four voice parts). The second part consists of works for two trebles; the third part for solo voice.

Although A Book of Ayres is described by Peter Warlock as containing "a good deal of very commonplace stuff," many of his musical settings work very well, especially the homorhythmic madrigal-like settings. Bartlet's music was widely popular in its time, appearing in many later manuscripts and prints.
