= Harriet Livermore =

American evangelist (1788–1868)

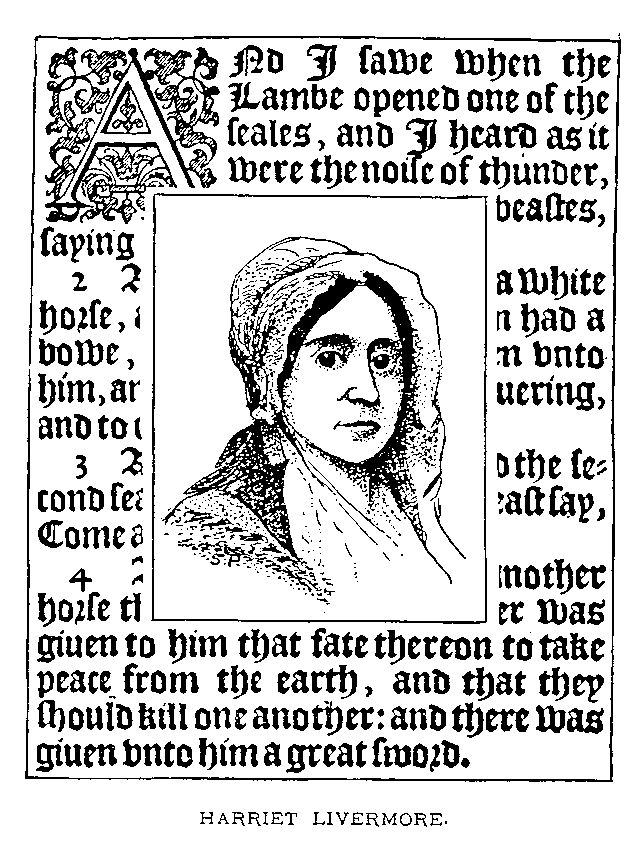
Harriet Livermore

Harriet Livermore (April 14, 1788 – 1868), is best known as a preacher, becoming one of the most well-known female preachers in America in the 19th century. She is referred to in John Greenleaf Whittier's poem Snow-Bound. She travelled widely throughout America and four times to the Holy Land.

== Origins and early life ==
Harriet Livermore was born on April 14, 1788, in Concord, New Hampshire, the daughter of Edward St. Loe Livermore, best known as a United States representative from Massachusetts; and granddaughter of Samuel Livermore, a United States Senator for New Hampshire. Her mother died when she was five and at eight her father placed her in a boarding school in Haverhill, Massachusetts, later sending her to Byfield Female Seminary in Byfield, Massachusetts and Atkinson Academy in New Hampshire.

== Preaching career ==
Livermore was raised a Congregationalist but showed little interest in religion until the year 1811 when she was twenty-three. She reflected later that:

It was in September, A.D. 1811, that tired of the vain, thoughtless life I had led, sick of the world, disappointed in all my hopes of sublunary bliss, I drew up a resolution in my mind to commence a religious life-to become a religious person....Neither fears of hell, nor desires for Heaven influenced the motion. I fled to the name and form of religion, as a present sanctuary from the sorrows of life.

By 1821, Livermore had decided she was called to be a preacher. "I felt under the most solemn obligations to dedicate the whole of my time to...God". A year later she had begun preaching in Christian Connection and Freewill Baptist congregations in New Hampshire.

Nevertheless, her fame spread, and she was invited to speak in the House of Representatives Chamber of the United States Congress in January 1827. Livermore was not the first woman to preach there (Dorothy Ripley was the first in 1806, but Livermore's sermon was such a success that she was able to speak before Congress three more times: in 1832, 1838, and 1843. President John Quincy Adams was in the audience for her first sermon and according to contemporary reports many of her listeners were deeply moved:

Her language was correct, persuasive, and judging by my own feelings, the profound attention and sympathy of the audience, extremely eloquent. Many wept even to sobbing....Judging, as I said, by my own feelings...I should say she is the most eloquent preacher I have listened to since the days of Mr. Waddell. But no language can do justice to the pathos of her singing. For when she closed by singing a hymn that might with propriety be termed a prayer...her voice was so melodious, and her face beamed with such heavenly goodness as to resemble a transfiguration, and you were compelled to accord them all to her.

== Theological beliefs ==
Early in her preaching career, "Livermore focussed on a traditional Protestant message of conversion, repentance, and salvation."

However, by 1831, Livermore was convinced that the Millennium was at hand. She was apparently influenced by a published letter in which Joseph Wolff, a converted Jew, wrote of his belief that the Lord "would come in the clouds of heaven, and stand upon the Mount of Olives, in A.D. 1847." So taken by Wolff's work was Livermore, that she had two thousand copies of his letter published as Millennial Tidings, no. 1. in 1831.

It was probably from Wolff also, that Livermore took her belief in the lost ten tribes of Israel. Unlike Wolff however, Livermore became convinced that the American Indians were the lost tribes, and in 1832 she set out alone to evangelize them. She faced stiff opposition by government officials at Fort Leavenworth but spent enough time there that the Osage Indians named her Wahconda's Wakko (God's woman).

Again from Wolff, Livermore seems to have accepted the idea of the literal, premillennial return of Jesus Christ to earth in 1847. In this date she differed from the Millerites, who predicted Christ's return first in 1843, then in 1844. Livermore recorded her millennial beliefs in verse:

"Millennium! the days are near,

When wicked ones shall quake with fear,

and in consuming fire wail.

That they did Joseph's peace assail."

Also contrary to the teachings of the Millerites, Livermore believed that the site of Christ's return would be the Mount of Olives in Jerusalem; and in 1837 she made the first of five journeys there.

Her changing and increasingly radical beliefs increasingly ostracized her from mainstream Christianity and even from fringe groups such as the Millerites and Mormons.

== Publications ==
- Scriptural Evidence in Favor of Female Testimony in Meetings for the Worship of God. (Portsmouth, NH, 1824).
- A Narration of Religious Experience. (Concord, NH, 1826).
- An Epistle of Love. (Philadelphia, PA, 1826).
- A Wreath From Jessamine Lawn; or, Free Grace, the Flower that Never Fades, 2 vols. (Philadelphia, PA, 1831).
- Millennial Tidings, no. 1. (Philadelphia, PA, 1831).
- Loud Echo in the Wilds of America. (Philadelphia, PA, 1835).
- A Letter to John Ross, the Principal Chief of the Cherokee Nation. (Philadelphia, PA, 1838).
- Millennial Tidings, no. 3. (Philadelphia, PA, 1838).
- Millennial Tidings, no. 4. (Philadelphia, PA, 1839).
- A Testimony for the Times. (New York, NY, 1843).
- The Counsel of God, Immutable and Everlasting. (Philadelphia, PA, 1844).
- Addresses to the Dispersed of Judah. (Philadelphia, PA, 1849).
- The Anointed Shepherd at the War Camp of Israel. (1856).
- Thoughts on Important Subjects. (Philadelphia, PA, 1864).

== See also ==
- Adventist
- Millennialism
- Christian eschatology
- Second Coming
- Second Great Awakening
