= John Greenleaf Whittier Homestead =

Coordinates: 42°48′36.8″N 71°2′15.6″W

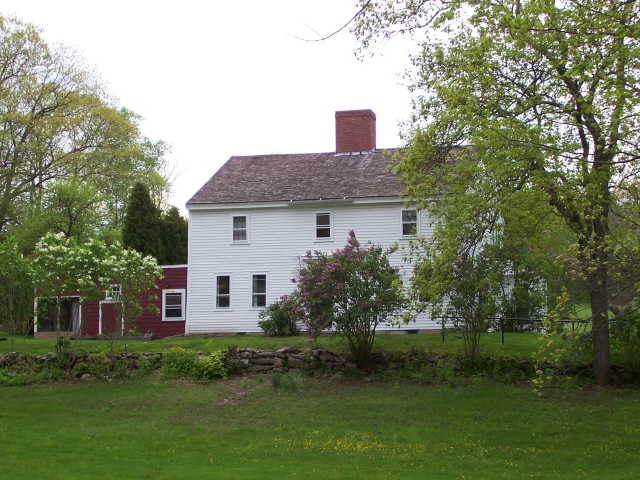
The Whittier Homestead in 2006

The John Greenleaf Whittier Homestead is the birthplace and home of American Quaker poet and abolitionist John Greenleaf Whittier. It currently serves as a museum. The homestead is located at 305 Whittier Road in Haverhill, Massachusetts.

== History ==
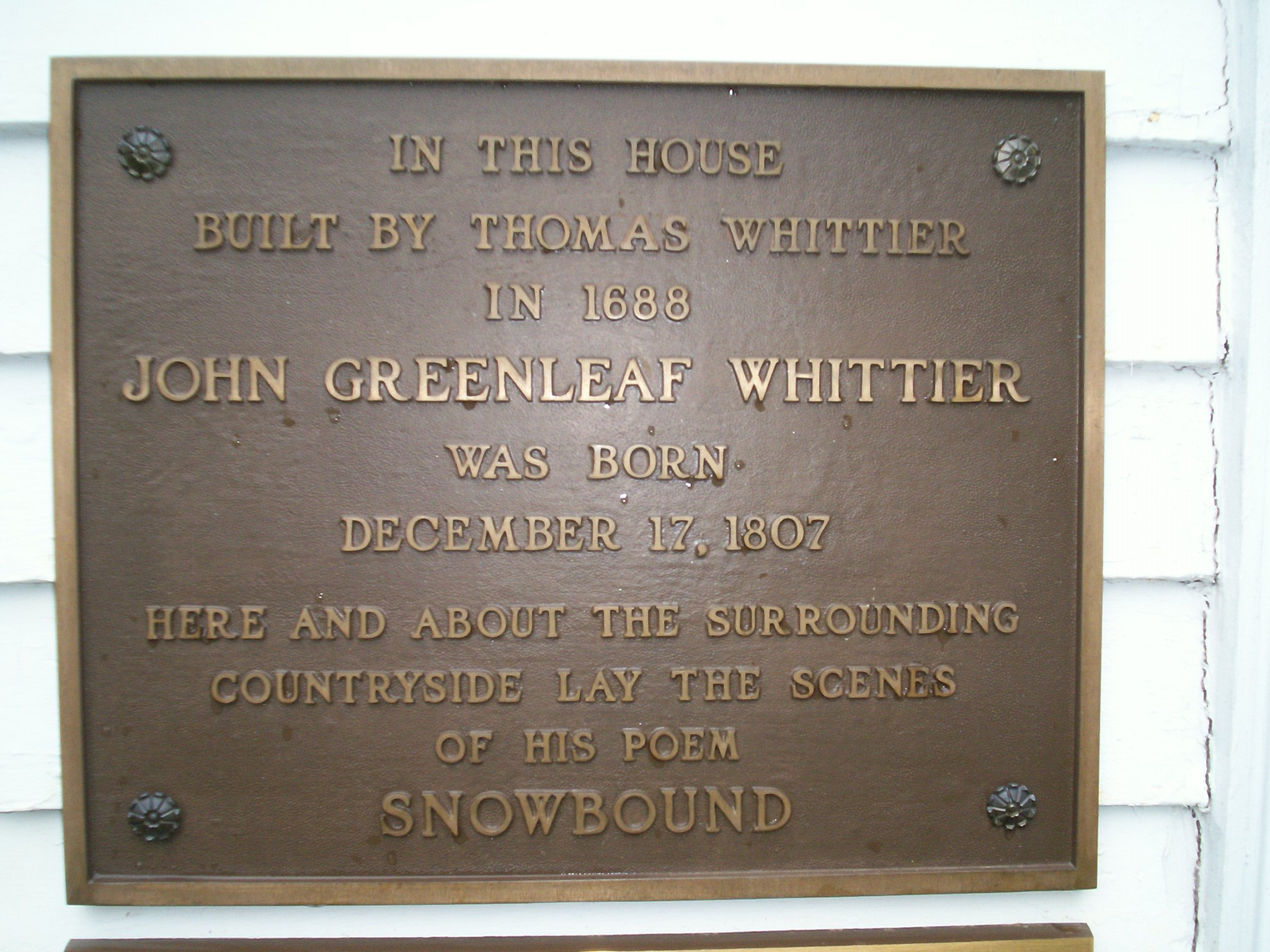
Dedication plaque

The home was built in 1688 by Thomas Whittier, pioneer and great-great-grandfather of John Greenleaf Whittier. Thomas Whittier chose the site (originally 148 acres) for its proximity to Fernside Brook, which could both provide water and turn the wheel of a gristmill.

The future poet John Greenleaf Whittier was born in December 1807 in the southwest parlor of the farm house, which today remains essentially the same as it was in that year. Growing up, Whittier lived the hard-working life of a farm boy. Amid strenuous labor, he suffered chronic headaches and fatigue and attended Quaker meetings or school infrequently. He also learned he was color-blind when he was unable to differentiate between ripe and unripe strawberries.

Here, he developed his love of reading thanks to a modest family library which included the poetry of Robert Burns. It was Whittier's sister Elizabeth and his mother Abigail who particularly encouraged his literary interests as a boy. His father John, on the other hand, was more economy-minded and insisted that his son's farm duties were more important than education or writing. Whittier's first poem, "The Exile's Departure", was published by the Newburyport Free Press on June 18, 1826, by editor William Lloyd Garrison. Garrison helped young Whittier attend Haverhill Academy, tuition for which was paid with food grown at the family farm. For a brief period, he was editor of the Haverhill Gazette.

Whittier lived in the home for 29 years. He moved to Amesbury, Massachusetts in 1836 and sold the family farm. The home he moved to, the John Greenleaf Whittier House, is also open to the public.

The homestead is the setting for Whittier's best-known narrative poem Snow-Bound, published in 1866 and an instant bestseller. Whittier also set many of his other poems in the Haverhill area, including "Fernside Brook", "The Barefoot Boy", and "The Sycamores". The popularity of Snow-Bound also made the home popular; revived interest in nostalgic kitchens spurred by the poem inspired fans to try to emulate Whittier's kitchen. The poet noted in 1881 that a Cleveland, Ohio resident asked for exact measurements of his Haverhill kitchen in order to recreate Whittier's childhood hearth. "I certainly never dreamed when writing 'Snow-Bound' ... that it could be worthy of a counterfeit presentation", he wrote.

== After Whittier ==
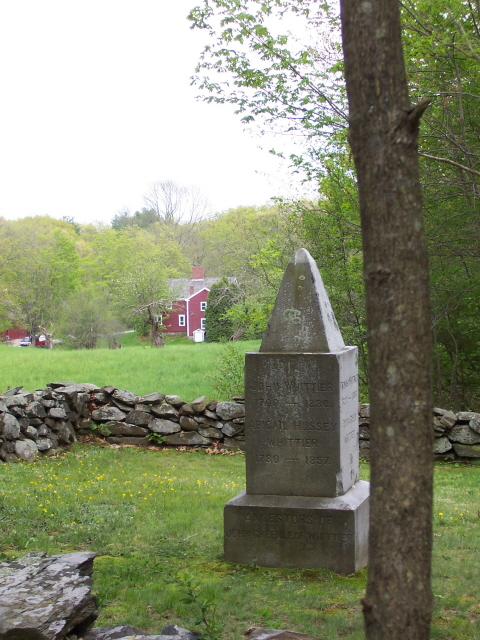
Marker for members of Whittier's family buried on site

After Whittier's death in 1892, James Carleton bought the farm. Carleton, a boyhood friend of the poet and a former mayor of Haverhill, donated the property to the Haverhill Whittier Club. It was officially opened in 1893, a year after the poet's death. Today, it functions as a hands-on museum dedicated to the poet's memory; visitors are allowed to sit in chairs actually used by the family, and the guest register sits on the desk built in 1786 for the poet's great grandfather.

The family burial plot is also located on the grounds of the Homestead. Whittier himself, however, is buried in Amesbury.

The home was opened as a museum during the Colonial Revival Movement in the United States and was among the first in an emerging trend of restoring homes of writers for tourism. Books in this period by people like Alice Morse Earle particularly emphasized old-fashioned New England ways. Earle herself made an icon of Whittier's hearth by including a photo of it in her book Home Life in Colonial Days and frequently quoting Snow-Bound throughout her writings.

== See also ==
- List of historic houses in Massachusetts
