= John Greenleaf Whittier House =

Historic house in Massachusetts, United States

- U.S. National Register of Historic Places
- U.S. National Historic Landmark
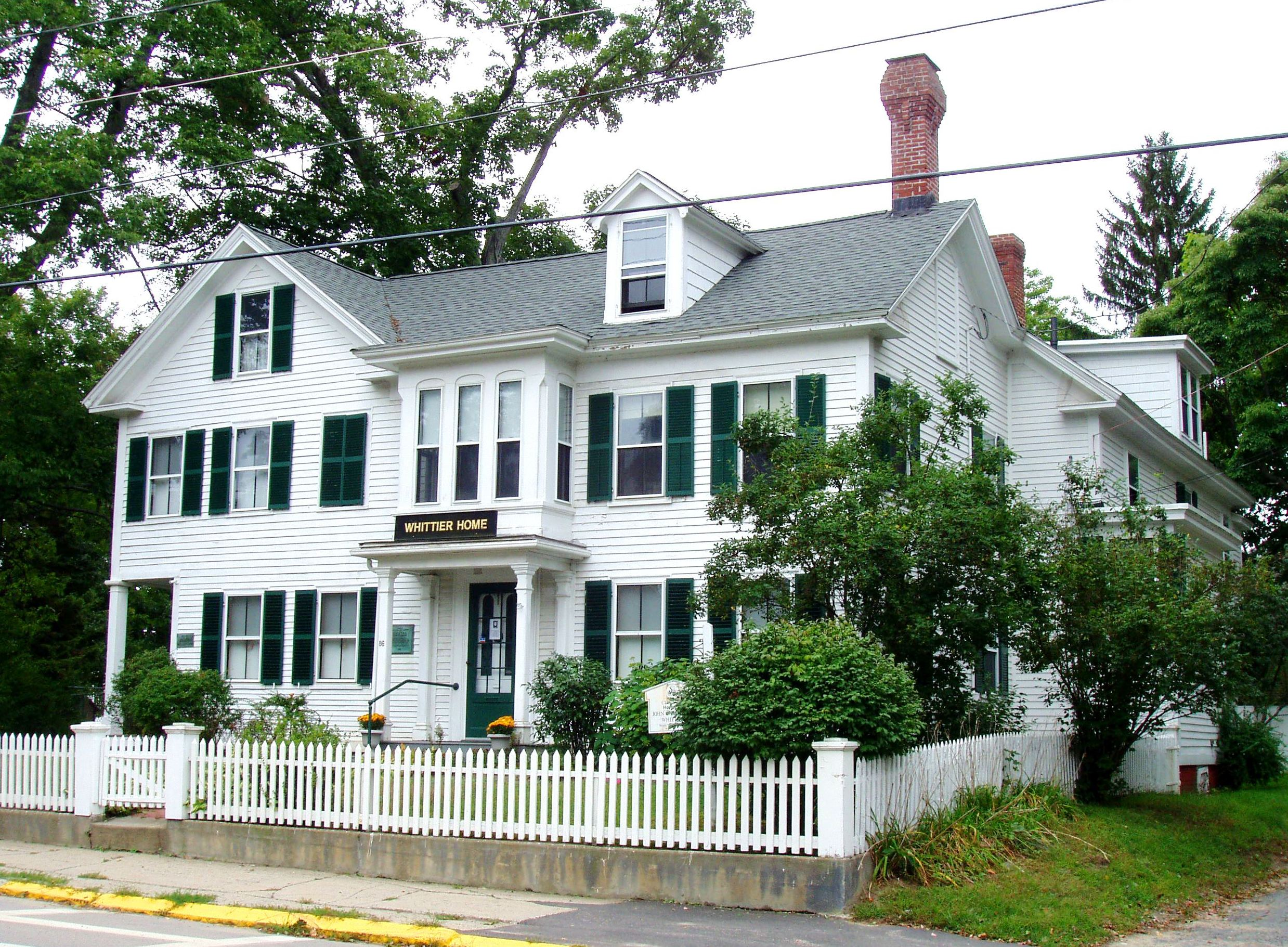
- John Greenleaf Whittier Home, Amesbury, Massachusetts

- Location within Massachusetts Location within the United States
- Location: 86 Friend St., Amesbury, Massachusetts
- Coordinates: 42°51′20″N 70°56′8″W
- Built: 1811
- NRHP reference No.: 66000792

Significant dates
- Added to NRHP: October 15, 1966
- Designated NHL: December 29, 1962

The John Greenleaf Whittier Home is a historic house located at 86 Friend Street, Amesbury, Massachusetts. It was the home of American poet and abolitionist John Greenleaf Whittier from 1836 until his death in 1892, and is now a nonprofit museum open to the public May 1 through October 31; an admission fee is charged. It was designated a National Historic Landmark in 1962, and listed on the National Register of Historic Places in 1966.

== History ==
The John Greenleaf Whittier House was built in 1811. At that time it was a 1 1/2-story wood-frame Cape style cottage, with four rooms on the ground floor and one in the attic. A kitchen ell and shed were added to the back. The house was purchased by Whittier in 1836 to provide accommodation for himself as well as his mother, aunt, and sister Eliza. He lived here until his death in 1892. Whittier wrote most of his poetry and prose in this house, including his classic Snow-Bound, which he wrote in the Garden Room.

The Whittier family made significant modifications to the house during their 80 years of ownership. Whittier added a bedroom to the southeast corner of the house not long after buying it. In 1847, with the financial assistance of Quaker philanthropist Joseph Sturge, the house was significantly enlarged. The new bedroom was enlarged and converted into a sitting room and study, a porch was added to the east side of the house, and a full second story was added over the eastern half of the house.

=== Preservation ===
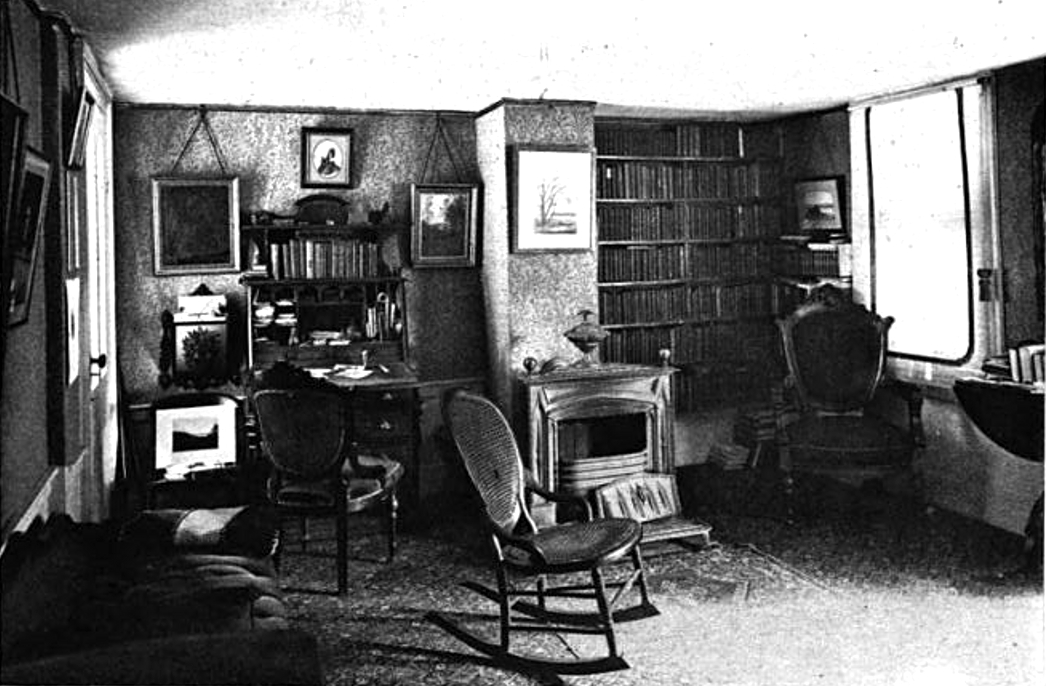
Whittier's study remains relatively unchanged since his death in 1892.

After Whittier's death in 1892, his niece, Lizzy Pickard, was not interested in maintaining the house. The Whittier Home Association was established in 1898 as a vehicle to preserve the house and the Whittier legacy. Lizzie's son, Greenleaf Pickard, in 1904 decided to live in the house, but made a series of additions in part to preserve the original portion used by Whittier. The west side of the house was also raised to a full two stories, and the kitchen ell was replaced by a two-story addition. The present front porch is believed to date to this time period as well. The old kitchen ell was separated from the house and is now a small outbuilding.

The house was subsequently acquired by the Whittier Home Association, and opened as a museum. The house and its furnishings are essentially unchanged from the poet's death, including living rooms, bedroom, and Whittier's writing study with all its furnishings.

Whittier's birthplace in nearby Haverhill, the John Greenleaf Whittier Homestead, is also open to the public.

== See also ==
- List of historic houses in Massachusetts
- List of National Historic Landmarks in Massachusetts
- National Register of Historic Places listings in Essex County, Massachusetts
