= Elizabeth Hussey Whittier =

American poet and abolitionist (1815–1864)

Elizabeth Hussey Whitter
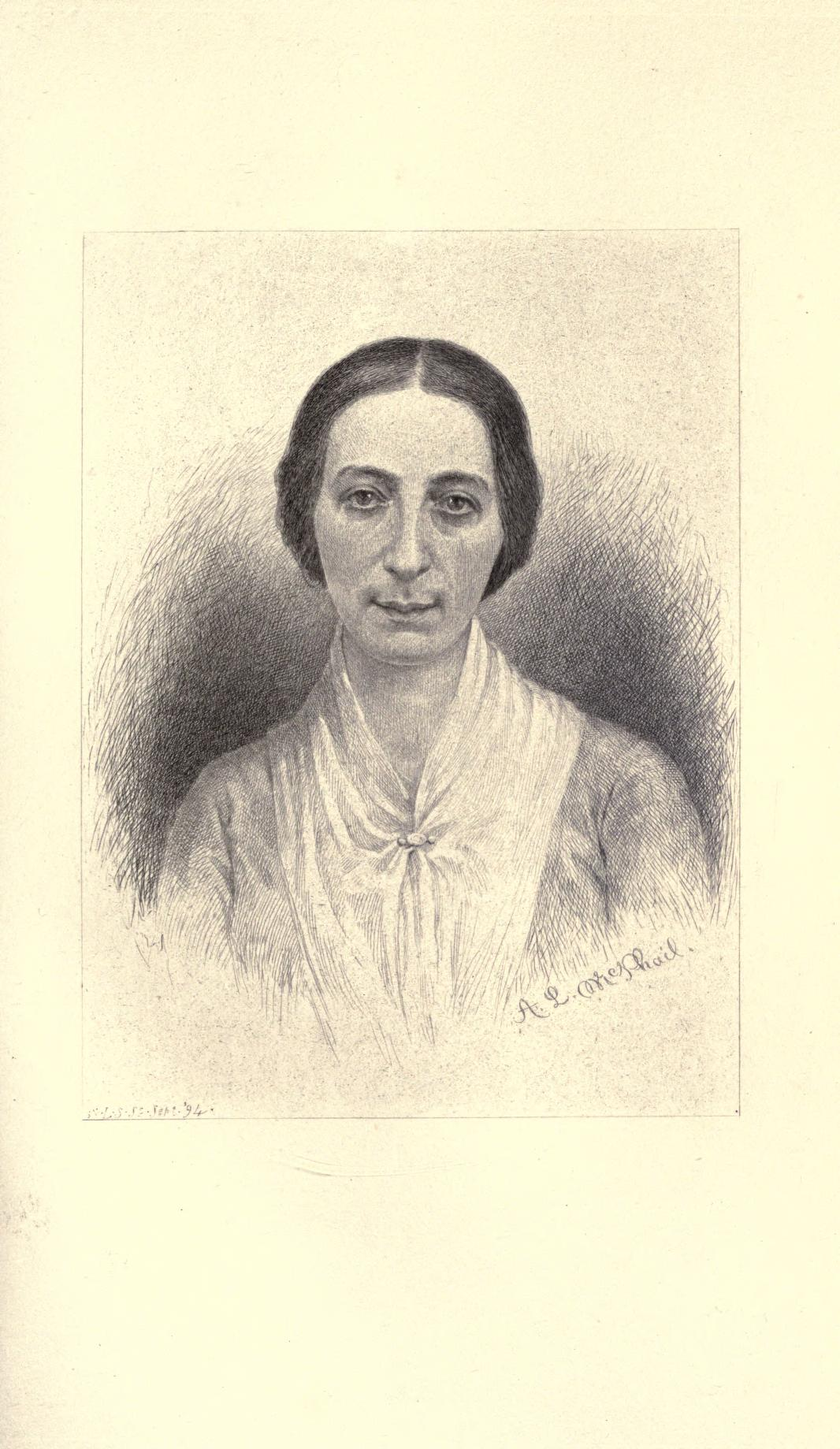
- Born: December 7, 1815; Haverhill, Massachusetts, US
- Died: September 3, 1864 (aged 48); Amesbury, Massachusetts, US
- Occupations: Poet, abolitionist
- Organization(s): Female Anti-Slavery Society, Boston
- Relatives: John Greenleaf Whittier (brother)

Elizabeth Hussey Whittier (December 7, 1815 – September 3, 1864) was an American poet and abolitionist, who founded the Female Anti-Slavery Society in Boston in 1833. Alongside her mother, she is credited with encouraging her brother John Greenleaf Whittier's interests in literature and poetry, and was his close companion and collaborator until her death.

== Life ==
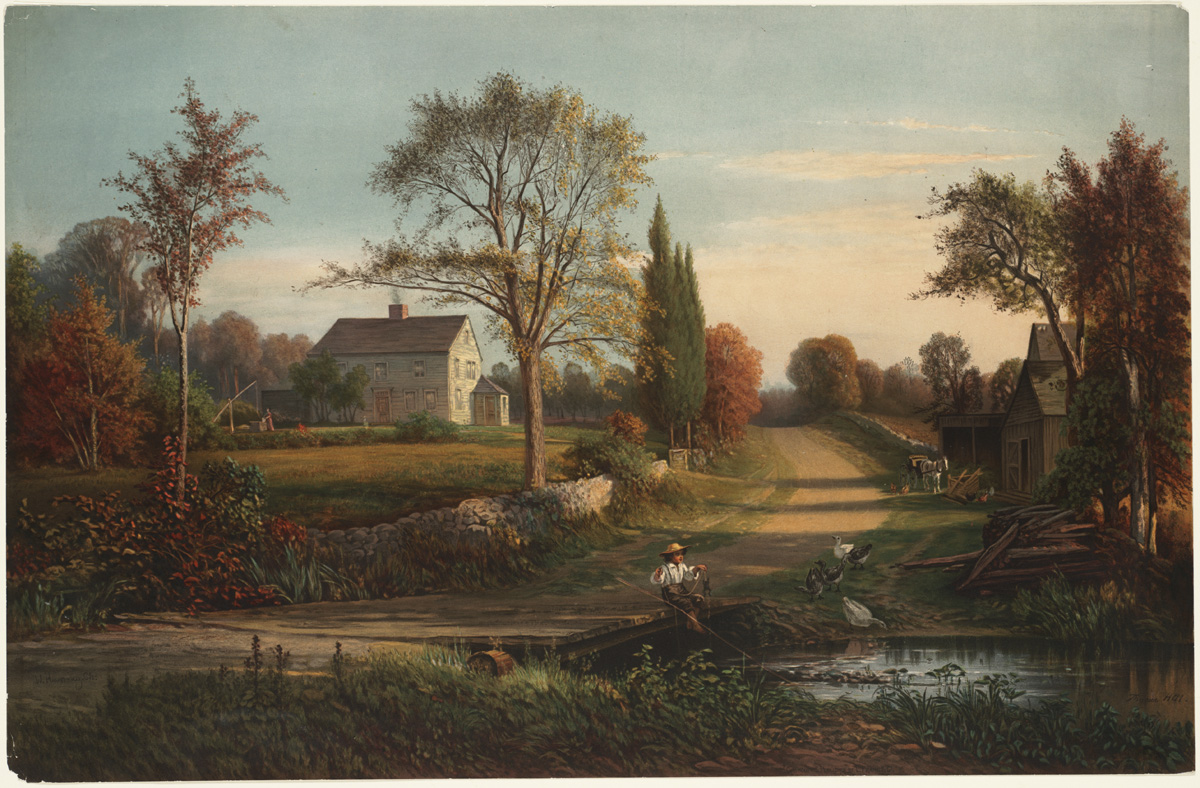
The Whittiers' childhood home in Haverhill, Massachusetts

Elizabeth Hussey Whittier was born in Haverhill, Massachusetts on December 7, 1815, the youngest child of four born to Abigail (née Hussey) and John Whittier. The family were Quaker.

Elizabeth and her elder brother John Greenleaf were very close, and she was described as his "intimate literary companion". Their relationship has been compared to other sibling collaborators such as Charles and Mary Lamb, and William and Dorothy Wordsworth. Following the death of their parents, Elizabeth remained at the Haverhill home to keep house for her brother. It was noted that her "vivacity and... readiness of speech" complemented her brother's greater reserve, and that it was she who "led the brilliant conversations that made the Whittier home a centre for the great writers of that period." Thomas Wentworth Higginson described Elizabeth's "gay raillery", which was "unceasing, and... enjoyed by him [John] as much as anybody, so that he really appeared to have transferred to her the expressions of his own opinions."

Other close friends of Elizabeth's were Lucy Larcom and Harriet Minot, who described Elizabeth as:

a sweet rare person, devoted to her family and friends, kind to everyone, full of love for all beautiful things, and so merry when in good health that her companionship was always exhilarating.

Elizabeth's delicate health was one reason for her devotion to home and family. John Greenleaf Whittier wrote:

Always in delicate health there was a constant solicitude on my part — a constant watchfulness over her — and for this perhaps I loved her all the more... She loved home, quiet and all beautiful things — enjoying as well as suffering much from her delicately sensitive temperament. No one ever had warmer friends.

Elizabeth Whittier was active in the abolitionist movement, and present at a meeting of the Female Anti-Slavery Society in 1835, when a mob interrupted the meeting and dragged William Lloyd Garrison into the street. She was noted for using her notability and her sex to help protect visiting anti-slavery speakers from attack, by shepherding them through hostile gatherings. On moving to a home in Amesbury, Whittier quickly became president of the Women's Anti-Slavery Society there, and her diaries suggest that she actively aided the escape of enslaved people to Canada.

== Death ==
Whittier died in Amesbury, Massachusetts at the age of 48, on September 3, 1864. She was remembered as "a lady of rare culture and fine poetic gifts". John Greenleaf Whittier, "accustomed to submit to her all that he wrote", described to a friend how without Elizabeth's influence he could "hardly tell whether what I write is good for anything or not".

John Greenleaf Whittier published a number of Elizabeth's poems in his collection, Hazel-Blossoms (1875). In an introductory note, he wrote:

I have ventured, in compliance with the desire of dear friends of my beloved sister Elizabeth H. Whittier, to add to this little volume the few poetical pieces which she left behind her. As she was very distrustful of her own powers, and altogether without ambition for literary distinction, she shunned everything like publicity, and found far greater happiness in generous appreciation of the gifts of her friends than in the cultivation of her own. Yet it has always seemed to me, that had her health, sense of duty and fitness, and her extreme self-distrust permitted, she might have taken a high place among lyrical singers.
