= Intervale Factory =

- U.S. National Register of Historic Places
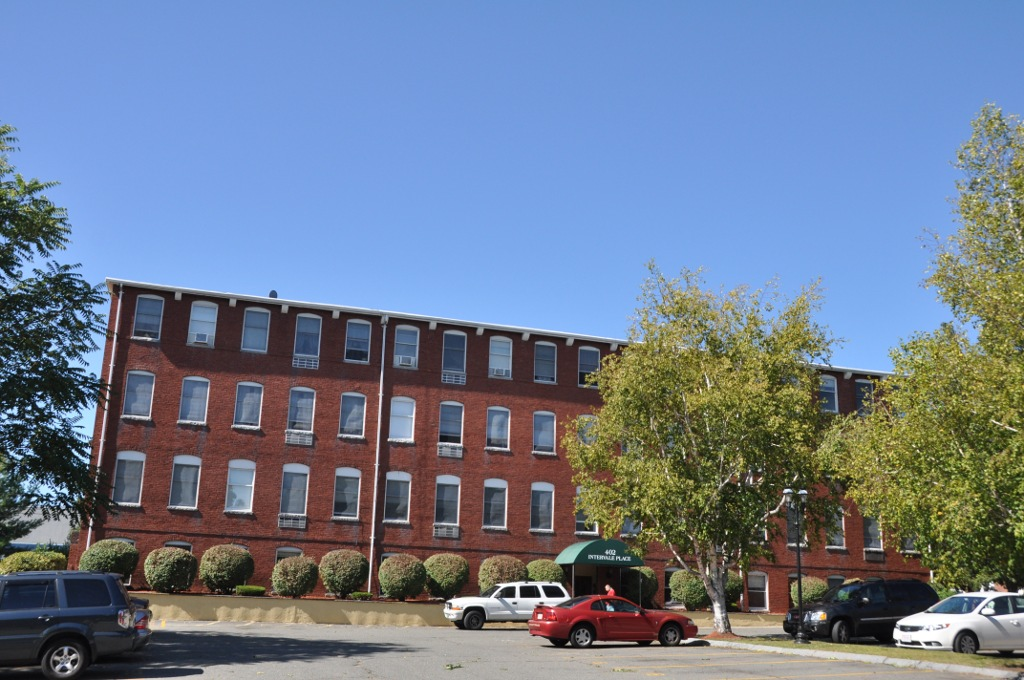

- Location within Massachusetts Location within the United States
- Location: 402 River St., Haverhill, Massachusetts
- Coordinates: 42°45′56″N 71°5′52″W
- Area: less than one acre
- Built: 1889
- Architect: Perkins & Bancroft
- Architectural style: Late Victorian
- NRHP reference No.: 88000958
- Added to NRHP: June 30, 1988

The Intervale Factory is a historic Late-Victorian factory building at 402 River Street in Haverhill, Massachusetts. Built in 1889, it is one of Haverhill's better-preserved shoe factory buildings. Now converted to apartments, it was listed on the National Register of Historic Places in 1988.

== Description and history ==
The former Intervale Factory stands west of downtown Haverhill, on the south side of River Street, just east of its junction with Swain Street. It is a long four-story brick building, with a flat roof and brick foundation. It is seven bays wide and eighteen long, with the narrow end oriented to the street. The street-facing historic front facade (now no longer serving in that role) has a bricked-over pedestrian entrance bay on the second level, next to a two-bay double-door non-functioning loading bay. Windows in the rightmost bay are at an offset from the others on the lower floors, because that is where the historic main staircase is located. Windows are set in segmented-arch openings with brick soldier headers, and rough granite sills. The present main entrance is near the center of the long east-facing facade.

The factory was built in 1889 to a design by Perkins & Bancroft for the Ellis and Connor Shoe Manufactory, and was one of a cluster of five factories built in the area that were powered by the Chick Brothers' steam plant. In the 1920s the building was converted to the manufacture of boxes. It was converted to residences in the late 1980s. Unlike many of the city's other shoe-related industrial buildings, this one is relatively little-altered.

== See also ==
- National Register of Historic Places listings in Essex County, Massachusetts
