= Primrose Street Schoolhouse =

- U.S. National Register of Historic Places
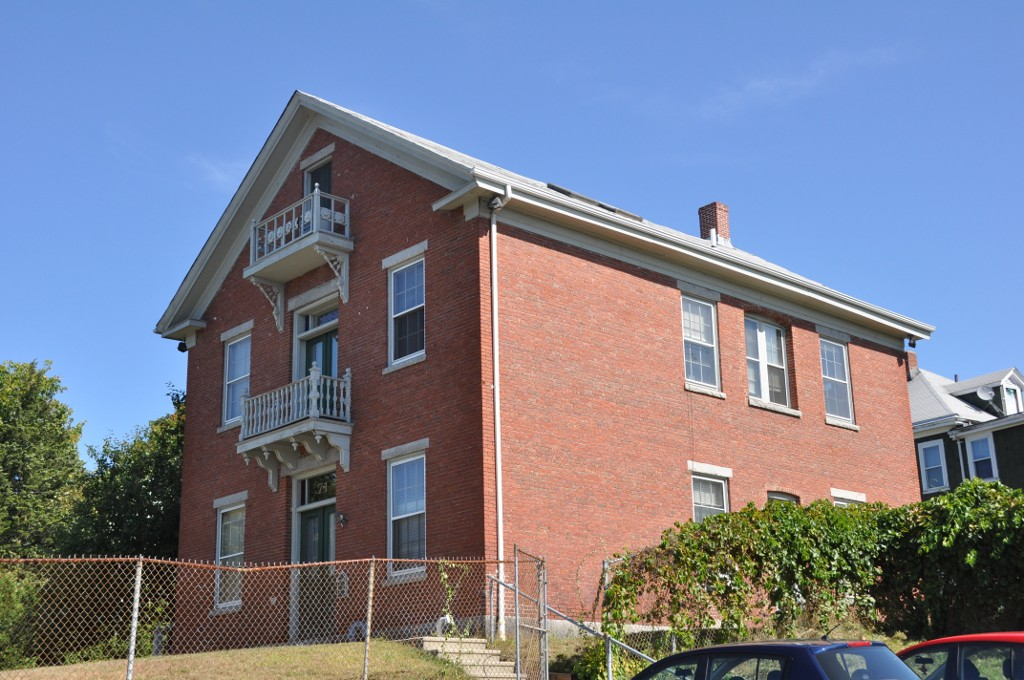

- Location within Massachusetts Location within the United States
- Location: Haverhill, Massachusetts
- Coordinates: 42°46′45″N 71°5′6″W
- Built: 1868
- Architect: Josiah M. Littlefield
- NRHP reference No.: 83000582
- Added to NRHP: June 23, 1983

The Primrose Street Schoolhouse is a historic school building at 71 Primrose Street in Haverhill, Massachusetts. The two story brick building was designed by Haverhill architect Josiah M. Littlefield and built in 1868 to meet increased demand for schooling occasioned by an influx of French Canadian families, and served as a public school until the 1890s. It was sold by the city in 1909, at which time it was converted into a multifamily residence. The building's 20th century uses, in addition to housing, have included office space for social service agencies, and a day care center.

The building was listed on the National Register of Historic Places in 1983.

== See also ==
- National Register of Historic Places listings in Essex County, Massachusetts
