= Dorothy Ripley =

British/American evangelist 1767–1831

- Born: Dorothy Ripley; 1767; Whitby, England
- Died: 1831 (aged 64)
- Occupation: Evangelist

Ecclesiastical career
- Religion: Methodist

Dorothy Ripley (1767–1831) was a British evangelist, who went to America in 1801 and died in 1831 in Virginia. She was a Quaker by confession, but had been raised a Methodist. She traveled thousands of miles in the United States and Britain as an effective evangelist on the camp meeting circuit. She ministered to many of the disenfranchised, including the Oneida people, men and women in prison, and African slaves in the Southern United States. She self-published six times; three of her books received a second printing. Ripley crossed the Atlantic Ocean at least nine times, mostly traveling alone. At her death a newspaper obituary termed her "perhaps the most extraordinary woman in the world."

== Early life ==
Ripley was born in Whitby, on the Yorkshire coast of England. Her father, William, was a close associate of John Wesley, who called him "a burning and shining light." William was working with Wesley at a time when Wesley was encouraging women to become preachers. William desired that his child should be a preacher, even before he knew her gender. He encouraged her toward that for as long as he was alive. Ripley's father died in her teen years, leaving the family in financial straits. They suffered a number of other setbacks, including the early deaths of some family members and a landslide that destroyed their home. These incidents had a profound impact on her.

Ripley chose to remain single, believing she was called to Christian ministry and unwilling to be tied down by the responsibilities of marriage.

== Work as an evangelist ==
Ripley traveled, engaging in itinerant preaching in the United States, and spending much time in New York, South Carolina and Georgia. She faced many challenges, including hostility from men and women toward female preachers. She was accused of being a lewd woman for allowing herself to be viewed publicly as a spectacle. A few of Ripley's opponents also accused her of prostituting herself, as she did not have an income as a means of regular support; her first years as a missionary were funded wholly by donations from people who believed in her ministry. This explains the title of her second book, The Bank of Faith and Works United. Ripley persevered, and often won over opponents through the effect of her preaching on large crowds.

Ripley felt sympathy from childhood for the slaves in America. Arriving in 1801 for her first trip there, she gained an audience with Thomas Jefferson to ask for his permission to minister to slaves, preach to slave owners, and found a school to educate the freed. During the meeting she rebuked the President for his slave ownership. She expressed particular concern for the African women being exploited by their slave owners. She secured the "approbation" of the President for her work. When in the South she ministered directly to African slaves and told slave-owners that they ought to give up their slaves.

Ripley also preached in many African-American churches. She preached for Rev. Absalom Jones' church on one occasion, and for Rev. Richard Allen on another. Allen had been hesitant to permit Ripley to preach there in 1802, but some of his members convinced him to allow her to do so. Later Ripley would be one of the speakers, with Rev. Allen and several other male preachers, in 1818. It is possible that with Ripley's example before him, Rev. Allen felt comfortable ordaining Jarena Lee in 1819.

In January 1806, Ripley preached at a church service inside the United States Capitol building, addressing the United States House of Representatives. She was the first woman to do so, and possibly the first woman to address Congress at all. Only one other woman, Harriet Livermore, received this honor. The event was attended by President Jefferson.

Ripley assisted Hugh Bourne in starting Primitive Methodism in the early years of the 19th century. With Lorenzo Dow and Bourne she preached an itinerant circuit in England. The revival services these three conducted brought many people into Primitive Methodist circles.

In 1830, Ripley led a revival that featured three other female preachers: Ruth Watkins, Nancy Towle and Ann Rexford.

== Relations with the Quakers ==
Attracted to the Quakers, Ripley began to attend their meetings. She identified closely with their doctrine of inner guidance by the light. Ripley loved the Society of Friends, but that love was not always mutual. She applied for membership with them three times, but they repeatedly refused. Several Friends privately supported Ripley financially, believing she was legitimately called by God to preach. David Sands and Priscilla Hanna Gurney were notable Quakers who gave Ripley a great deal of personal and practical support.

== Relations with the Methodists ==
Ripley was raised as a Methodist and most of her theological understanding reflected that background. Ripley was exposed to many famous Methodists in her early life. Her father hosted the founder of Methodism John Wesley at his house on several occasions. With him came his traveling group of women preachers, including Sarah Crosby and Mary Bosanquet.

Ripley also met Bishop Francis Asbury, who greatly encouraged her in her preaching. She associated with many other famous Methodists, including Bishop Whatcoat, Ruth Watkins and Hugh Bourne. Ripley also traveled extensively with Lorenzo Dow, while doing a preaching tour in Britain with Bourne. That tour included a stay in a prison for a night, when she and the eccentric Dow were arrested.

== Publishing career ==
Ripley published five books: The Extraordinary Conversion and Religious Experience of Dorothy Ripley (1810); The Bank of Faith and Works United (1819); An Account of Rose Butler (1819); Letters Addressed to Dorothy RIpley (1807), which included a book of poems called An Address to All Difficulties; and the memoir and collected notes of her father. She published all these at her own expense. The first three received a second printing. Ripley used the proceeds to fund her continued itinerant preaching ministry.

== See also ==
- Harriet Livermore
- Absalom Jones
- Thomas Jefferson
- Aaron Burr
