= Effie Alberta Read =

American scientist (~1873 – 1930)

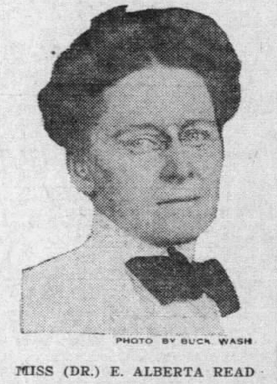
Effie Alberta Read, from a 1913 publication.

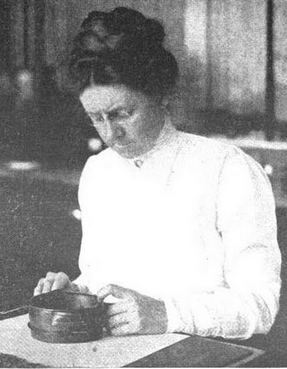
Effie Alberta Read, from a 1913 publication.

Effie Alberta Read (born about 1873 – died September 1, 1930) was an American scientist who researched food safety for the U. S. Food and Drug Administration.

== Early life ==
Effie Alberta Read was born in Haverhill, Massachusetts, the daughter of Albert F. Read and Myra A. Davis Read. She attended Mount Holyoke College from 1896 to 1898, but she earned her bachelor's, master's, and doctoral degrees at Cornell University (in 1903, 1906, and 1907, respectively), and a medical degree at George Washington University. Her dissertation topic was the comparative anatomy of olfaction in dogs, cats, and humans.

== Career ==
While she was a graduate student at Cornell University, she was an assistant in the Histology and Embryology Department, teaching and researching under professor Simon Henry Gage; Gage's expertise in microscopy shaped Read's later work.

Read's work at the U. S. Department of Agriculture's Bureau of Chemistry (the precursor to the U. S. Food and Drug Administration) focused on the detection of adulterated foods, following the Pure Food and Drug Act in 1906. She invented a quick test, known as the Read Tea Test, for detecting artificial dyes and other impurities in imported tea. There were legal objections from tea importers, as to the accuracy of the Read Tea Test. The importers' lawsuit was dismissed in 1914.

Read also worked on testing black pepper for added materials. She became the Assistant Chief of the Bureau's Microanalytical Laboratory before her retirement in 1930. She was an associate member of the Medical Society of the District of Columbia from 1914, and active in the Woman's Clinic Auxiliary.

== Personal life ==
Read died weeks after her retirement, in 1930, from ovarian cancer. She was 57 years old.
