= Haverhill, Massachusetts =

- City
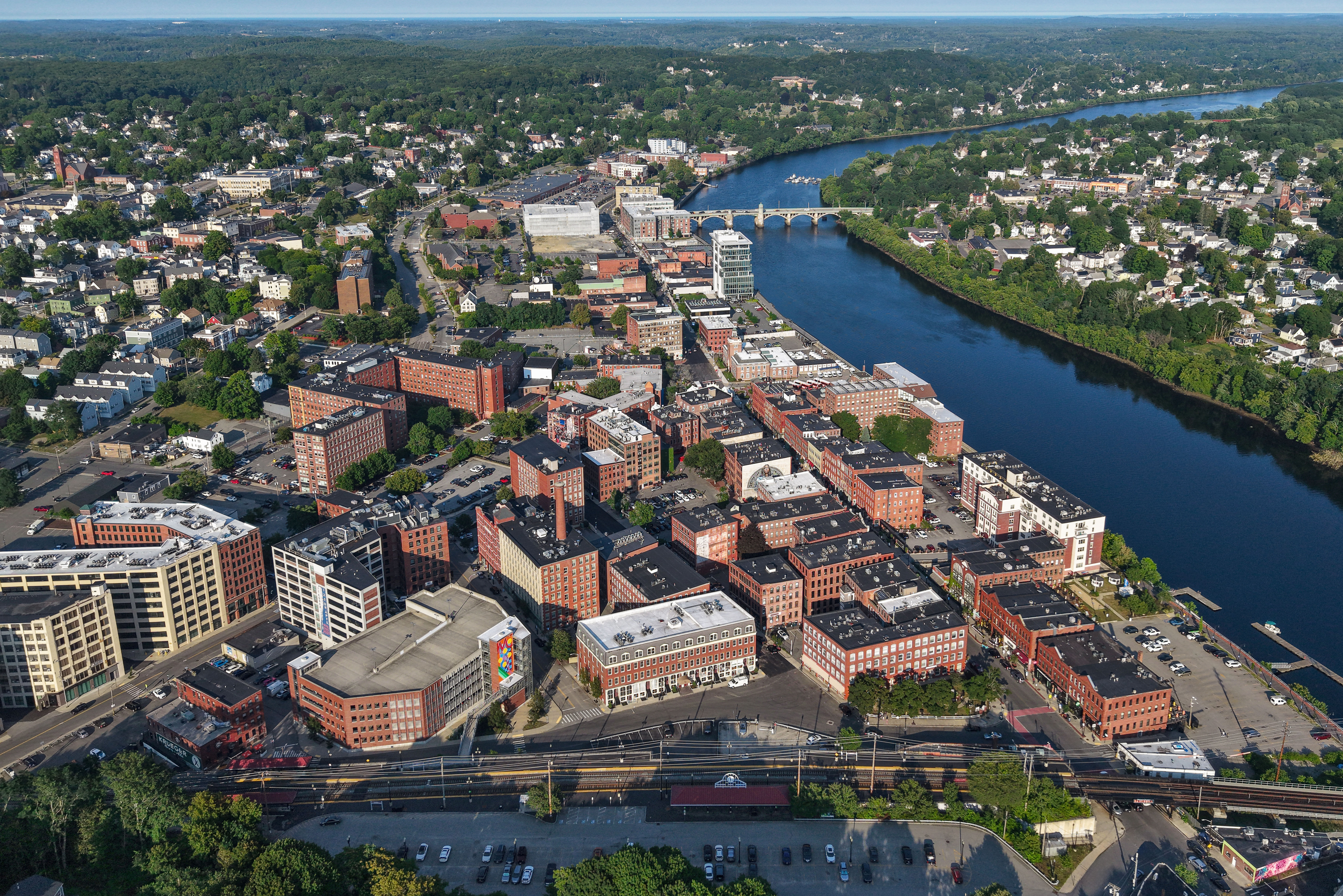
- Haverhill in 2026

- Flag Seal
- Nickname: "The Queen Slipper City"
- Location in Essex County, Massachusetts

- Location in Massachusetts Location in the United States
- Coordinates: 42°47′N 71°5′W
- Country: United States
- State: Massachusetts
- County: Essex
- Settled: 1640
- Incorporated: 1641
- Incorporated (city): 1870
- Named for: Haverhill, Suffolk

Government
  - Type: Mayor-council city (Strong Mayor)
  - Mayor: Melinda Barrett

Area
  - Total: 35.70 sq mi (92.45 km^{2})
  - Land: 33.03 sq mi (85.56 km^{2})
  - Water: 2.66 sq mi (6.89 km^{2})
- Elevation: 50 ft (15 m)

Population (2020)
  - Total: 67,787
  - Density: 2,051.9/sq mi (792.24/km^{2})
- Time zone: UTC−5 (Eastern)
  - Summer (DST): UTC−4 (Eastern)
- ZIP Codes: 01830–01832, 01835
- Area code: 351/978
- FIPS code: 25-29405
- GNIS feature ID: 0612607
- Website: www.haverhillma.gov

Haverhill (/ˈheɪvrɪl/ HAY-vril) is a city in Essex County, Massachusetts, United States. Haverhill is located 35 miles (56 km) north of Boston on the New Hampshire border and about 17 miles (27 km) from the Atlantic Ocean. The population was 67,787 at the 2020 United States census.

Located on the Merrimack River, Haverhill began as a farming community of Puritans, largely from Newbury Plantation. The land was officially purchased from the Pentuckets on November 15, 1642 (one year after incorporation) for three pounds, ten shillings. Pentucket was renamed Haverhill (after the Ward family's hometown in England) and evolved into an important industrial center, beginning with sawmills and gristmills run by water power. In the 18th and 19th centuries, Haverhill developed woolen mills, tanneries, shipping and shipbuilding. The town was home to a significant shoe-making industry for many decades. By the end of 1913, one tenth of the shoes produced in the United States were made in Haverhill, and because of this the town was known during the time as the "Queen Slipper City".

== History ==
Haverhill has played a role in nearly every era of American history, from the initial colonial settlement, to the French and Indian Wars, and the American Revolutionary and Civil Wars.

=== 17th century ===
The town was founded in 1640 by settlers from Newbury, and was originally known as Pentucket, which is Algonquian for "place of the winding river". Settlers such as John Ward, Robert Clements, Tristram Coffin, Hugh Sheratt, William White, and Thomas Davis aided in the purchase of Pentuckett. The land was sold by Passaquo and Saggahew who claimed to have permission from Passaconaway, though nothing more is known of these two figures in the historical record and it is not clear whether they were at liberty to sell the land, or indeed whether they had a shared understanding of what such a contract would entail. When Haverhill was founded, it was incorporated into Norfolk County, Massachusetts Colony. When New Hampshire was separated from Massachusetts in 1679, Haverhill lost most of its county and was annexed to Essex County.

Settlers Thomas Hale, Henry Palmer, Thomas Davis, James Davis and William White were Pentuckett's first selectmen. First Court appointments given to end small causes were given to Robert Clements, Henry Palmer, and Thomas Hale. At the same court, it was John Osgood and Thomas Hale that were also appointed to lay the way from Haverhill to Andover. It is said that these early settlers worshipped under a large oak tree, known as the "Worshipping Oak".

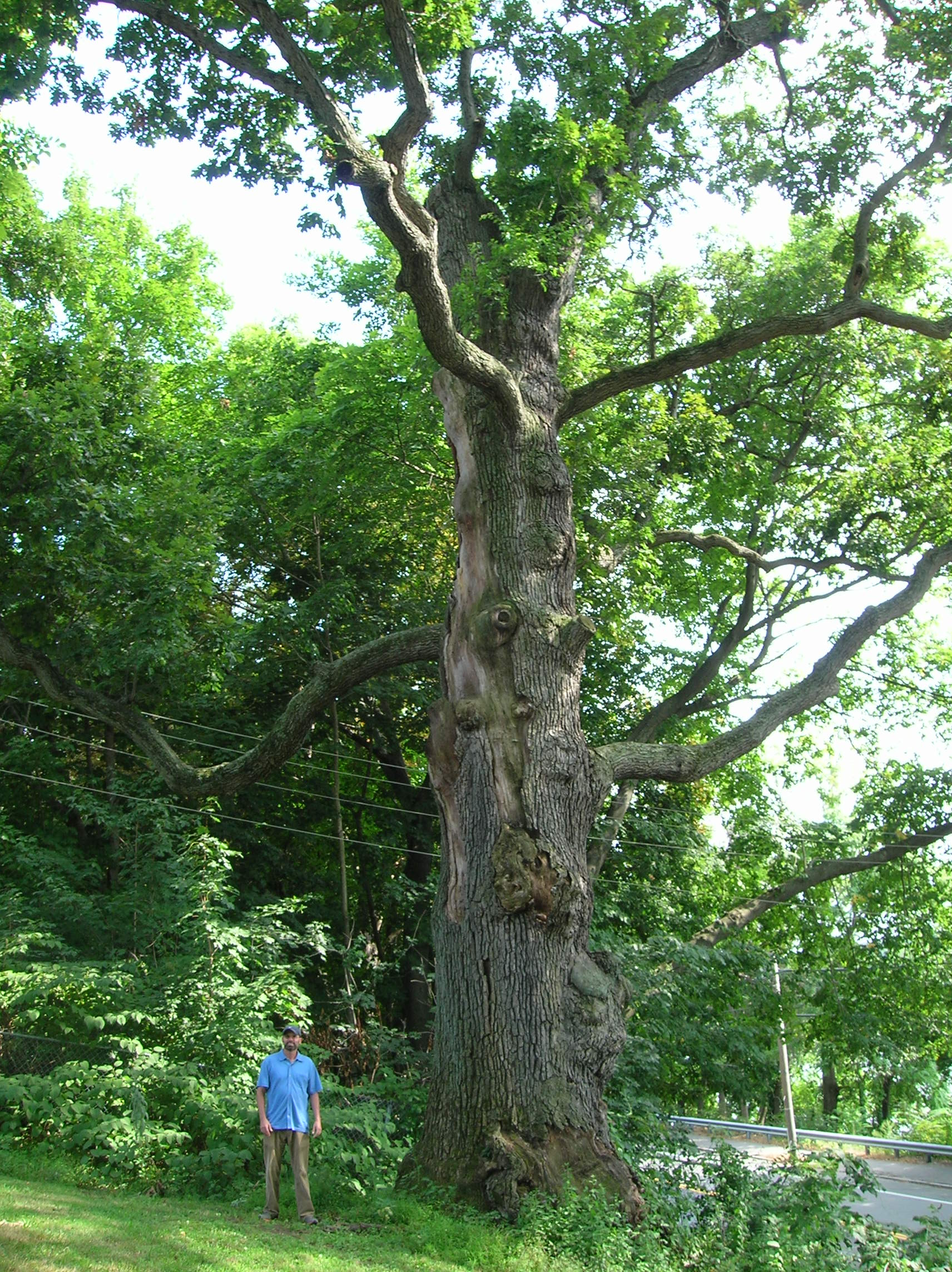
Worshipping Oak, August 2012

The town was renamed for the English town of Haverhill, Suffolk, in deference to the birthplace of the settlement's first pastor, Rev. John Ward. The original Haverhill settlement was located around the corner of Water Street and Mill Street, near the Linwood Cemetery and Burying Ground. The home of the city's father, William White, still stands, although it was expanded and renovated in the 17th and 18th centuries. White's Corner (Merrimack Street and Main Street) was named for his family, as was the White Fund at Boston's Museum of Fine Arts.

Judge Nathaniel Saltonstall was chosen to preside over the Salem witch trials in the 17th century; however, he found the trials objectionable and recused himself. Historians cite his reluctance to participate in the trials as one of the reasons that the witch hysteria did not take as deep a root in Haverhill as it did in the neighboring town of Andover, which had among the most victims of the trials. However, a number of women from Haverhill were accused of witchcraft, and a few were found "guilty" by the Court of Oyer and Terminer.

One of the initial group of settlers, Tristram Coffin, ran an inn. However, he grew disenchanted with the town's stance against his strong ales, and in 1659 left Haverhill to become one of the founders of the settlement at Nantucket.

Haverhill was for many years a frontier town, and was occasionally subjected to Indian raids, which were sometimes accompanied by French colonial troops from New France, in which dozens of civilians were murdered. During King William's War, Hannah Dustin became famous for killing and then scalping her native captors, who were converts to Catholicism, after being captured in the Raid on Haverhill (1697). The city has the distinction of featuring the first statue erected in honor of a woman in the United States. In the late 19th century, it was Woolen Mill Tycoon Ezekiel J. M. Hale that commissioned a statue in her memory in Grand Army Republic Park. The statue depicts Dustin brandishing an axe. Her captivity narrative and subsequent escape and revenge upon her captors caught the attention of Cotton Mather, who wrote about her, and she also received from the colonial leaders a reward per Indian scalp. In recent years some have criticized Hannah Dustin since the Native American Indians she killed and scalped in order to escape were allegedly not her original captors and among the people she killed were young children. Hannah, born Hannah Emerson, is often maligned for coming from a troubled family: in 1676 her father Michael Emerson was fined for excessive violence toward his 12-year-old daughter Elizabeth, who in 1693 was hanged for concealing the deaths of her illegitimate twin daughters; and in 1683 Hannah's sister Mary was whipped for fornication. There were never any allegations of any sort against Hannah herself.

=== 18th century ===
In 1708, during Queen Anne's War, the town, then about thirty homes, was raided by a party of French, Algonquin and Abenaki Indians. Like most towns, Haverhill has been struck by several epidemics. Diphtheria killed 256 children in Haverhill between November 17, 1735, and December 31, 1737.

George Washington visited Haverhill on November 4, 1789. This tour was part of "A tour through the Eastern states in order to acquire knowledge of the face of the Country, the growth and agriculture thereof and the temper and disposition of the inhabitants toward the new government," according to Washington.

=== 19th century ===
The Bradford Academy was established in 1803. It began as a co-educational institution, then became women-only in 1836.

In 1826, influenza struck. A temperance society was formed in 1828.

Haverhill residents were early advocates for the abolition of slavery, and the city still retains a number of houses which served as stops on the Underground Railroad. In 1834, a branch of the American Anti-Slavery Society was organized in the city. In 1841, citizens from Haverhill petitioned Congress for dissolution of the Union, on the grounds that Northern resources were being used to maintain slavery. John Quincy Adams presented the Haverhill Petition on January 24, 1842. Even though Adams moved that the petition be answered in the negative, an attempt was made to censure him for even presenting the petition. In addition, poet and outspoken abolitionist John Greenleaf Whittier was from Haverhill.

The Haverhill and Boston Stage Coach company operated from 1818 to 1837 when the railroad was extended to Haverhill from Andover. It then changed its name and routes to the Northern and Eastern Stage company.

Ezekiel Hale Jr. and his son, Ezekiel James Madison Hale (descendants of Thomas Hale), significantly expanded Haverhill's industrial capacity. In the summer of 1835, they erected a brick factory on Winter Street designed to produce 600 yards (550 m) of woolen flannel per day. When fire destroyed the operation in 1845, the younger Hale, a 21-year-old Dartmouth College graduate, rebuilt the mill at Hale's Falls. The new facility was more than twice as large and produced nearly three times the original output, establishing him as a leading local industrialist. Hale later served a term in the State Senate and donated large sums of money to build the city's hospital and library.

Haverhill was incorporated as a city in 1870.

In the early morning hours of February 17, 1882, a massive fire destroyed much of the city's mill section, in a blaze that encompassed over 10 acres (4.0 ha). Firefighting efforts were hampered by not only the primitive fire fighting equipment of the period, but also high winds and freezing temperatures. The nearby water source—the Merrimack River—was frozen, and hoses dropped through the ice tended to freeze as well. A New York Times report the next day established the damage at 300 businesses destroyed and damage worth approximately $2M (in 1882 dollars).

==== Annexation ====
Bradford fits naturally into Haverhill but they were separate towns until January 1, 1897, when Bradford joined the City of Haverhill. Bradford was originally the western part of Rowley until it split from Old Rowley in 1672. In 1850, the East part of Bradford left and was founded as the independent town of Groveland. When Haverhill became a city in 1870, there were calls for Bradford to be annexed. This would go on for another 26 years. Neither town agreed to a plan, until in late 1896, the vote came up and both sides agreed to join.

There were many reasons for the decision. Finances played a part into the annexation; a lot of people who lived in Bradford had businesses in Haverhill and wanted lower taxes. Traditionalists wanted Haverhill to be a dry town as Bradford was. Businesses in Lawrence, Portsmouth, and Andover wanted Haverhill to be a dry town so more business would show up and increase businesses in those towns. The demand for municipal services like hospitals, schools, and a new factory downtown were in Haverhill while Bradford had none of the three. The Bradford Center of town wanted to join Haverhill but the Ward Hill section of town did not at the time since it was a substantial distance from both Bradford and Haverhill.

Finally, another reason why Haverhill wanted to annex Bradford was to return the town to majority English instead of the plurality of Irish, French Canadians and Central Europeans (Hungarians, Slovaks, Germans, and Italians) it had become with the influx of mill workers. Haverhill gladly approved with the first ballot in 1870 and Bradford was no more starting January 1, 1897. Bradford remains the only town in the Commonwealth of Massachusetts to be annexed to a neighboring city other than Boston.

Haverhill became the first American city with a socialist mayor in 1898 when it elected former shoe factory worker and cooperative grocery store clerk John C. Chase. Chase was re-elected to this position in 1899 but was defeated the following year.

=== 20th century ===
Haverhill was the site of a riot in 1915 as well as the eponymous Haverhill fever, also known as rat-bite fever, in 1926.

In the early part of the 20th century, the manufacturing base in the city came under pressure as a result of lower priced imports from abroad. The Great Depression exacerbated the economic slump, and as a result city leaders enthusiastically embraced the concept of urban renewal in the 1950s and 1960s, receiving considerable federal funds used to demolish much of the north side of Merrimack Street, most of the Federal homes along Water Street (dating from the city's first hundred years of development), and throughout downtown. Many of the city's iconic buildings were lost, including the Oddfellows Hall, the Old City Hall, the Second Meetinghouse, the Pentucket Club, and the Old Library, among others.

In 1932, French residents erected a statue of Marquis de Lafayette which still stands today in the aptly named intersection called Lafayette Square.

During Urban Renewal, the iconic high school—the inspiration for Bob Montana's Archie Comics—was declared "unsound" and slated for demolition. Instead, the historic City Hall on Main Street was demolished, and city began using the High School of Archie's Gang as the new City Hall.

Urban Renewal was controversial. Several leading citizens argued to use the funds for preservation rather than demolition. Their plan was not accepted in Haverhill, which chose to demolish much of its historic downtown, including entire swaths of Merrimack Street, River Street, and Main Street. However, examples of the city's architecture, spanning nearly four centuries, abound: from early colonial houses (the White residence, the Dustin House, the 1704 John Ward House, the 1691 Kimball Tavern, and the historic district of Rocks Village) to the modernist 1960s architecture of the downtown Haverhill Bank. The city's Highlands district, adjacent to downtown, is a fine example of the variety of Victorian mansions built during Haverhill's boom years as a shoe manufacturing city.

=== 21st century ===
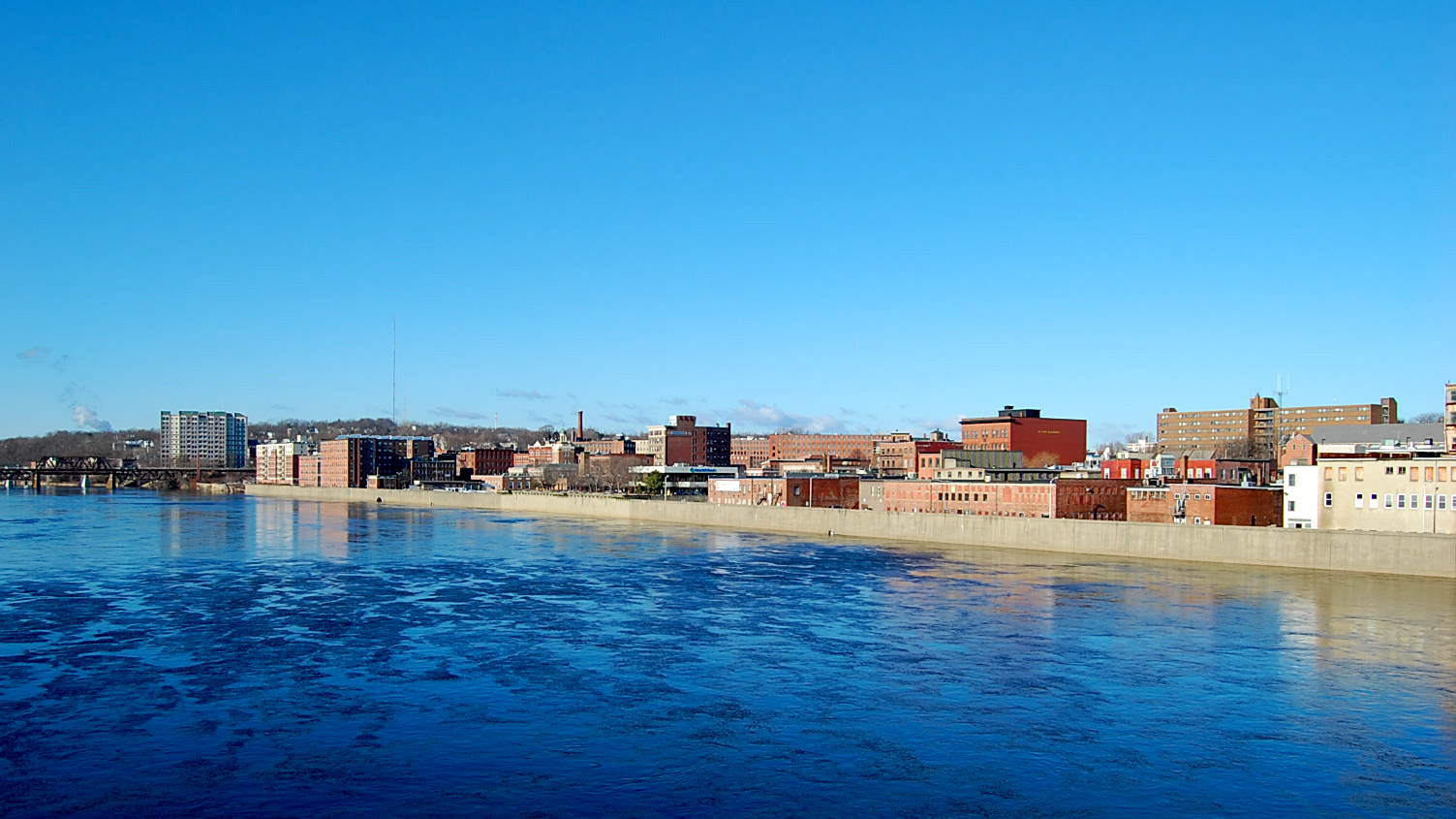
Haverhill from across the Merrimack River in 2008

Throughout the 21st century, Haverhill has undergone a substantial renaissance of many sorts. Housing trends, combined with a rezoning by the city led by longtime Mayor James Fiorentini and the use of Federal and State brownfields money to clean up abandoned factories, resulted in the conversion of several abandoned factories in downtown into loft apartments and condominiums. There has been a total of $150 million in public and private investment in the old factory district area. Additionally, the Washington Street area gained new dining and entertainment spots, with federal, state and local funds contributing to removing an abandoned gas station on Granite Street. The site was cleaned up and converted into a 350-space parking garage. The city was also able to obtain federal, state and local money to put in a new boardwalk and boat docks in the downtown area aside the Merrimack River.

In recent years, the city completed a rezoning of downtown proposed by Mayor Fiorentini designed to encourage artist loft live work space and educational uses for the downtown area. Despite the city's efforts, old buildings remain vacant or underutilized, such as the former Woolworth department store, which has been boarded up for over 40 years at the intersection of Main Street and Merrimack Street. The building was eventually purchased, with plans put into place to renovate and repurpose the site; however, this never actually happened. On March 19, 2015, the Woolworth building was demolished to make way for a $68 million (~$87.7 million in 2024) development.

In 2018, it was announced that the mayor's administration was successful in acquiring $13 million (~$15.9 million in 2024) in state funding to go towards increasing pedestrian safety on North Avenue, a major northern route connecting the city to Plaistow, New Hampshire.

=== Timeline ===
Timeline of Haverhill, Massachusetts
- 1640 - European settlers arrive.
- 1645
  - Town of Haverhill incorporated.
  - First Parish Church founded.
- 1679 - Town becomes part of Essex County.
- 1697 - Hannah Duston captured during King William's War.
- 1708 - Town raided during Queen Anne's War.
- 1735 - Diphtheria epidemic.
- 1789 - George Washington visits town.
- 1790 - Population: 2,408.
- 1796 - Haverhill Social Library organized.
- 1803 - Bradford Academy founded.
- 1812 - Haverhill Musical Society organized.
- 1814 - Merrimack Bank incorporated.
- 1818 - Haverhill and Boston Stage Coach in operation.
- 1821 - Haverhill Gazette begins publication.
- 1826 - Influenza outbreak.
- 1835 - Farrington & Chace shoe manufactory in business.
- 1837 - Andover and Haverhill Railroad begins operating.
- 1840 - Population: 4,336.
- 1850 - Population: 5,877.
- 1852 - Haverhill Athenaeum established.
- 1853 - Smiley & Sons machinery dealer in business.
- 1858 - Macy's dry good shop in business.
- 1859 - Haverhill Library Association established.
- 1868
  - Primrose Street Schoolhouse built.
  - Herman F. Morse & Co. picture store in business.
- 1869 - Morse & Son's Circulating Library in business.
- 1870 - City of Haverhill incorporated.
- 1871 - Haverhill Hat Company incorporated.
- 1873 - Fire.
- 1875 - Winnekenni Castle (residence) built.
- 1877 - Jennings & Spaulding and E.H. Emerson & Co. shoe manufactories in business.
- 1878 - Haverhill Furniture Exchange in business.
- 1880 - Population: 18,472.
- 1882 - February - Fire.
- 1883 - Merrimac Bridge constructed.
- 1885
  - Bon Ton Bazar opens.
  - Pentucket Wheel Club organized.
- 1889
  - City Hall rebuilt.
  - Intervale Factory built.
- 1890 - John C. Tilton Elementary School was built.
- 1895 - Peabody School built.
- 1897 - Town of Bradford becomes part of Haverhill.
- 1898
  - John C. Chase (socialist) becomes mayor.
  - Haverhill Historical Society incorporated.
- 1900 - Population: 37,175.
- 1901 - St. Michael the Archangel Parish founded.
- 1906 - Board of Trade Building constructed.
- 1916 - Rotary Club established.
- 1947 - WHAV radio begins broadcasting.
- 1961 - Northern Essex Community College opens.
- 1972 - Whittier Regional Vocational Technical High School established.
- 1988 - Haverhill Community Television incorporated.
- 1989 - Mason & Hamlin piano manufactory relocates to Haverhill.
- 1997 - John F. Tierney becomes U.S. representative for Massachusetts's 6th congressional district.
- 1998 - Pentucket Lake School Opens
- 2003
  - City website online.
  - James J. Fiorentini elected mayor. Mayor Fiorentini is the longest-serving mayor in Haverhill's history, which has had Mayors since 1870.
- 2007 - Niki Tsongas becomes U.S. representative for Massachusetts's 5th congressional district.
- 2008
  - Spotlight Playhouse founded.
  - Zion Bible College relocates to Haverhill.
- 2010 - Population: 60,879.
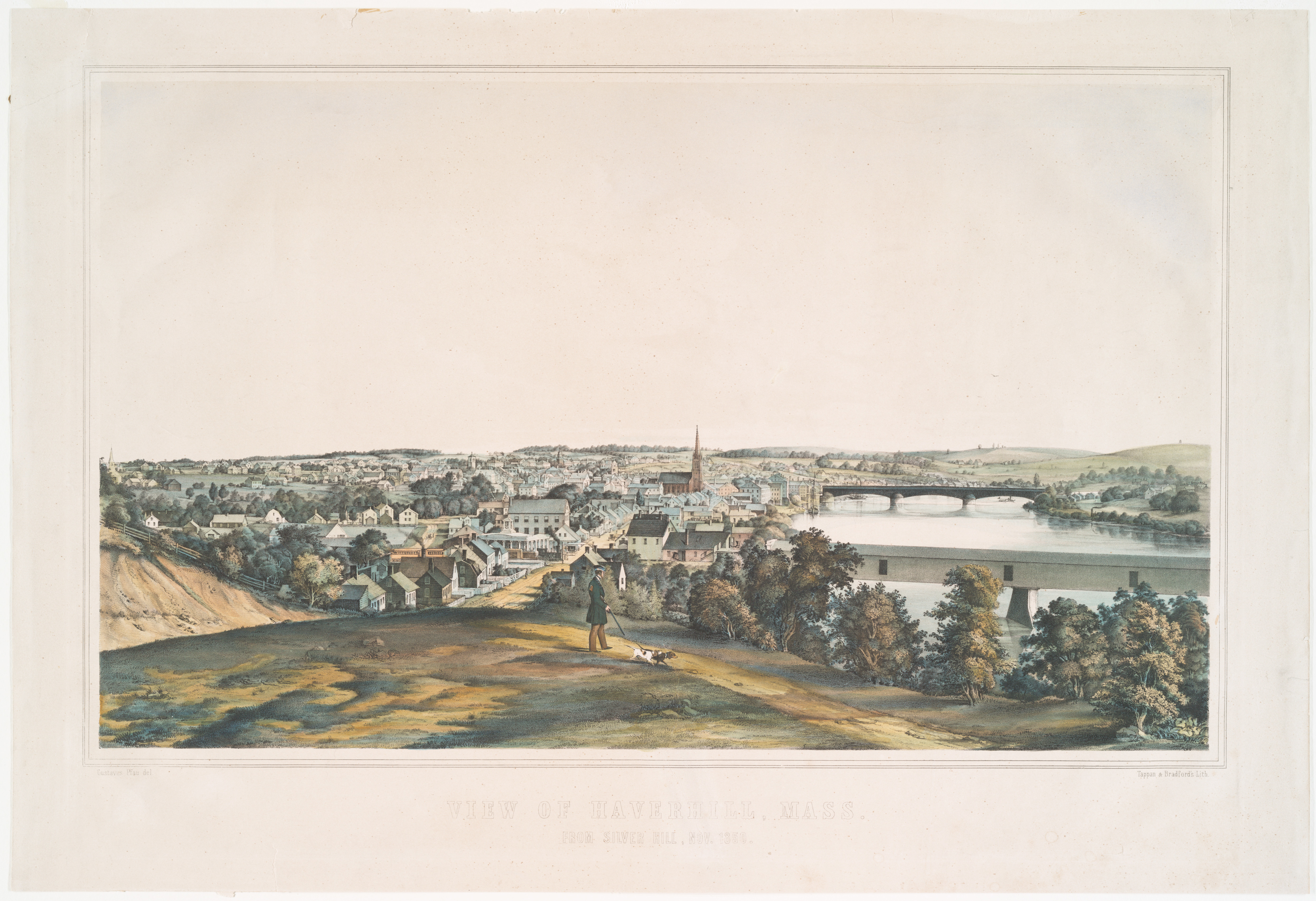
View of Haverhill, 1850

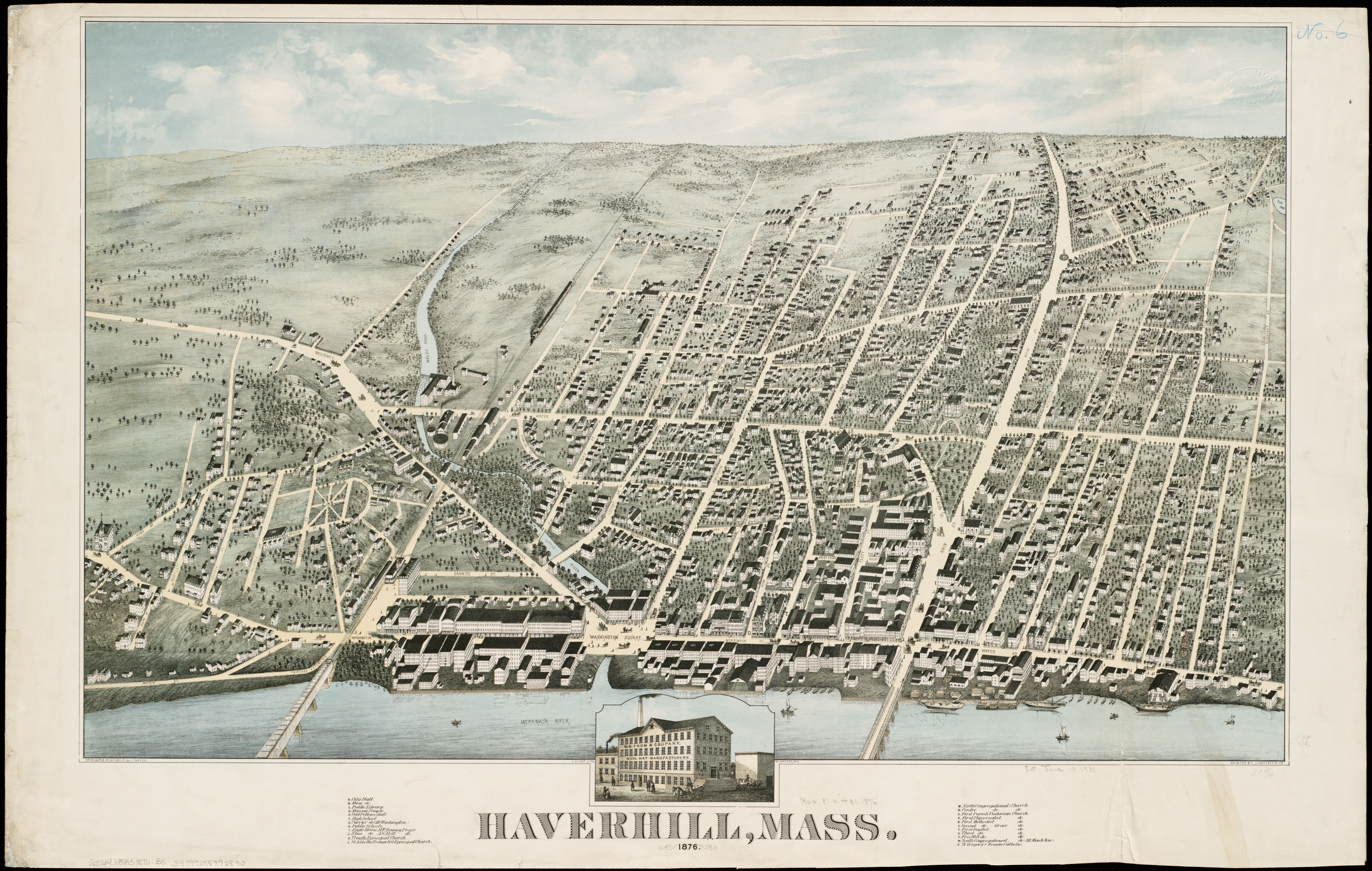
Map of Haverhill, 1876

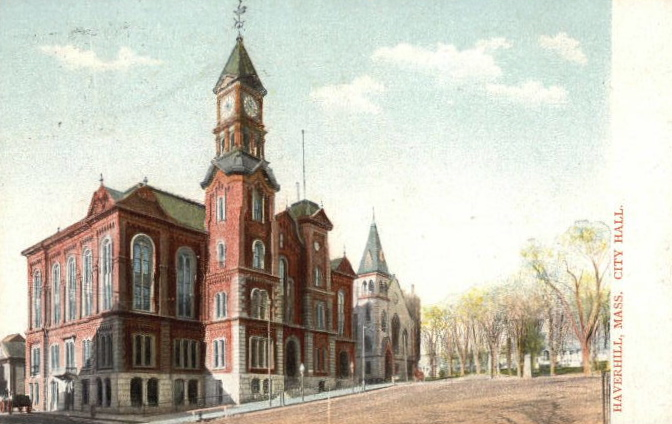
City Hall, built 1889

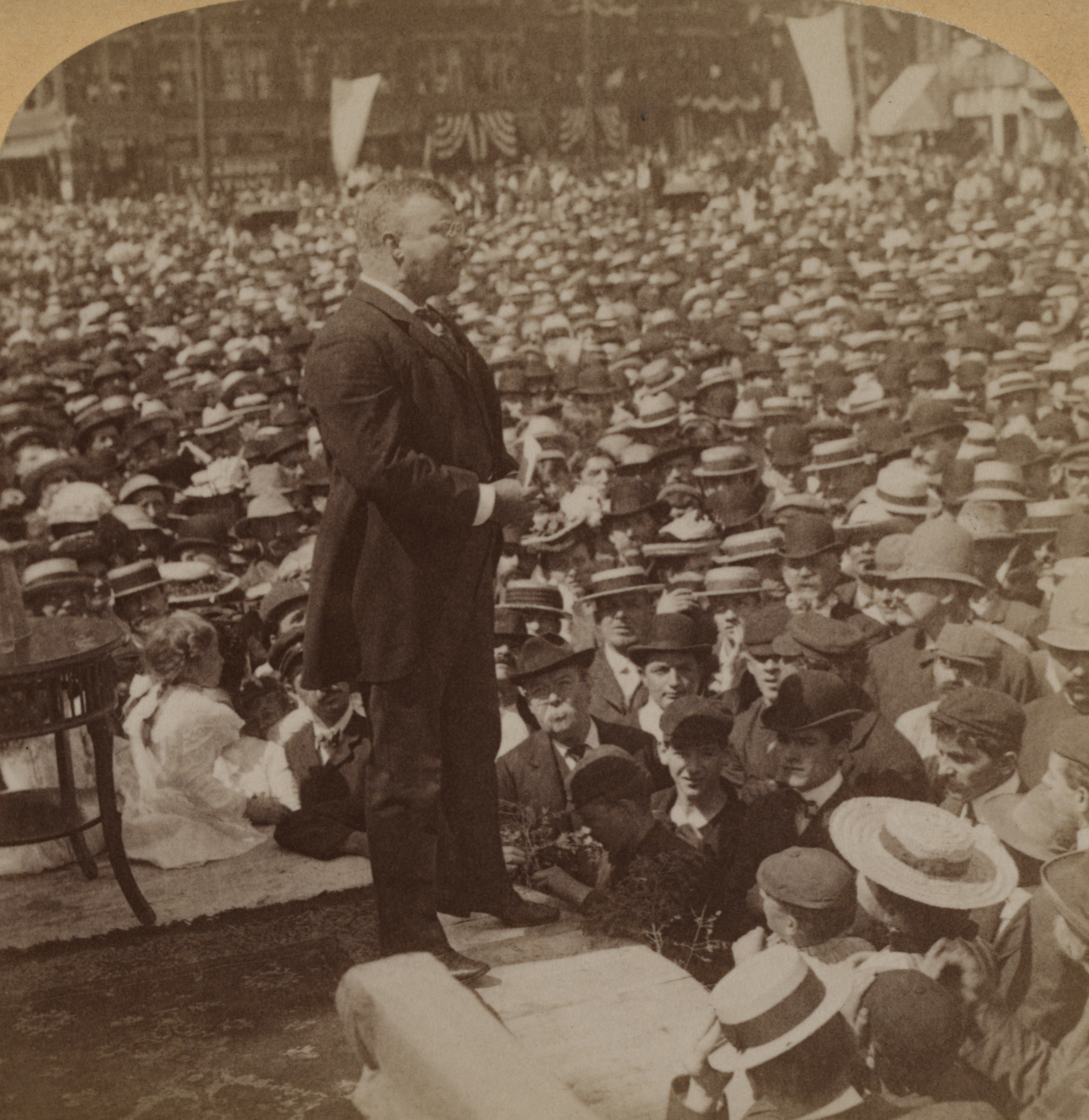
Teddy Roosevelt addressing crowd in Haverhill, 1902

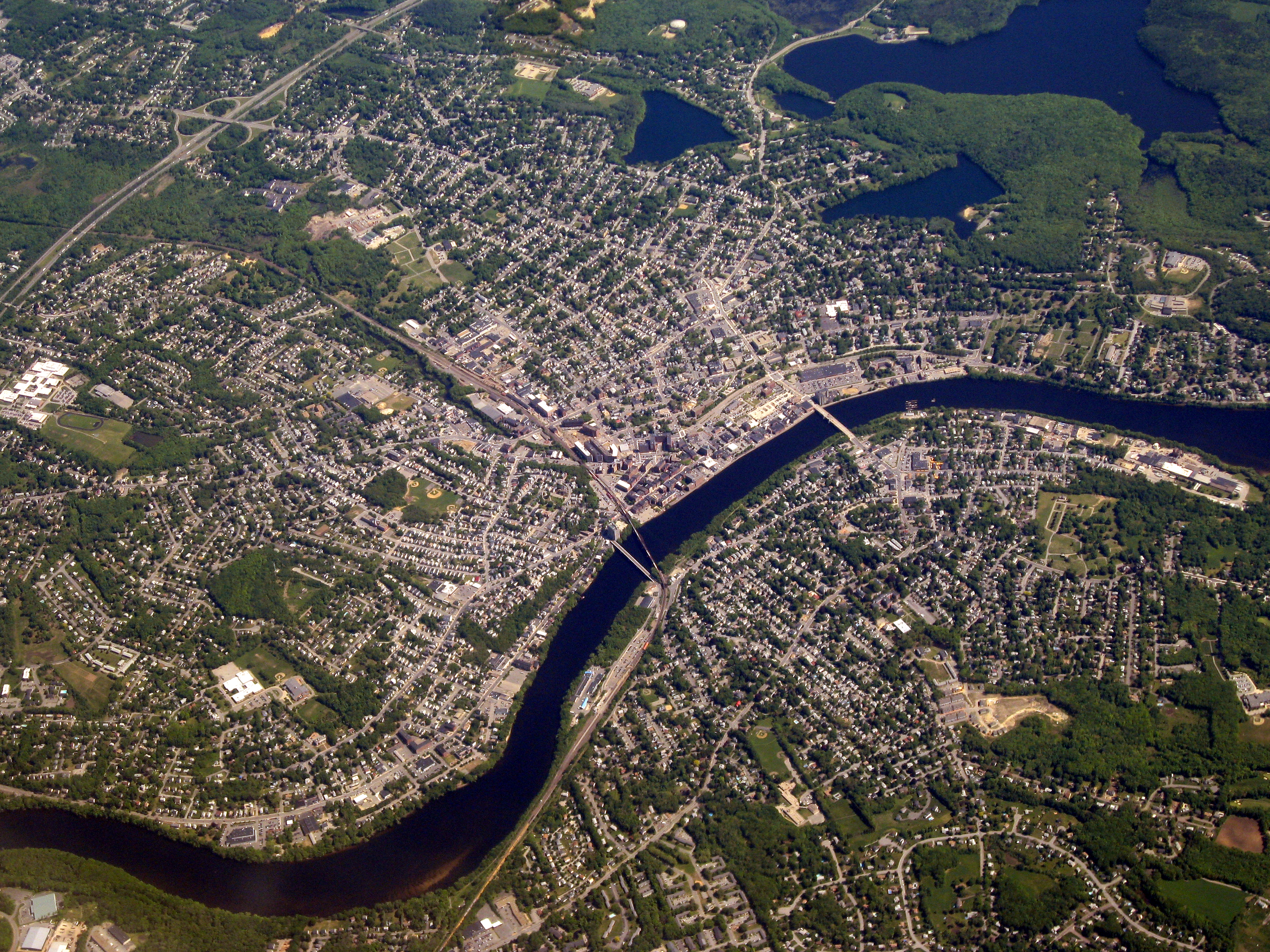
Aerial view of Haverhill, 2008

== Geography ==
According to the United States Census Bureau, the city has a total area of 35.6 square miles (92.3 km^{2}), of which 33.0 square miles (85.4 km^{2}) is land and 2.7 square miles (6.9 km^{2}), or 7.47%, is water. The city ranks 60th in the Commonwealth in terms of land area, and is the largest city or town in Essex County. Haverhill is drained by the Little and Merrimack rivers, the latter separating the Bradford section of town from the rest of Haverhill. The highest point in the city is found on Ayers Hill, a drumlin with two knobs of almost equal elevation of at least 335 feet (102 m), according to the most recent (2011–2012) USGS 7.5-minute topographical map. The city also has several ponds and lakes, as well as three golf courses.

Haverhill is bordered by Merrimac to the northeast, West Newbury and Groveland to the east, Boxford and a small portion of North Andover to the south, Methuen to the southwest, and Salem, Atkinson and Plaistow, New Hampshire, to the north. From its city center, Haverhill is 8 miles (13 km) northeast of Lawrence, 14 miles (23 km) southwest of Newburyport, 27 miles (43 km) southeast of Manchester, New Hampshire, and 32 miles (51 km) north of Boston.

=== Climate ===
Climate data for Haverhill, Massachusetts (1991–2020 normals, extremes 1899–present)
Month	Jan	Feb	Mar	Apr	May	Jun	Jul	Aug	Sep	Oct	Nov	Dec	Year
Record high °F (°C)	71 (22)	77 (25)	90 (32)	95 (35)	99 (37)	101 (38)	105 (41)	104 (40)	98 (37)	89 (32)	84 (29)	76 (24)	105 (41)
Mean maximum °F (°C)	56.8 (13.8)	58.8 (14.9)	67.8 (19.9)	80.6 (27.0)	88.6 (31.4)	91.9 (33.3)	94.0 (34.4)	92.5 (33.6)	88.7 (31.5)	79.2 (26.2)	70.4 (21.3)	61.1 (16.2)	95.7 (35.4)
Mean daily maximum °F (°C)	34.9 (1.6)	37.6 (3.1)	45.0 (7.2)	57.0 (13.9)	67.5 (19.7)	76.4 (24.7)	82.4 (28.0)	81.1 (27.3)	73.5 (23.1)	61.8 (16.6)	50.5 (10.3)	40.2 (4.6)	59.0 (15.0)
Daily mean °F (°C)	25.6 (−3.6)	27.2 (−2.7)	34.7 (1.5)	45.6 (7.6)	56.1 (13.4)	65.4 (18.6)	71.8 (22.1)	69.9 (21.1)	62.3 (16.8)	50.7 (10.4)	40.5 (4.7)	31.2 (−0.4)	48.4 (9.1)
Mean daily minimum °F (°C)	16.2 (−8.8)	16.9 (−8.4)	24.3 (−4.3)	34.3 (1.3)	44.8 (7.1)	54.4 (12.4)	61.1 (16.2)	58.8 (14.9)	51.1 (10.6)	39.6 (4.2)	30.6 (−0.8)	22.3 (−5.4)	37.9 (3.3)
Mean minimum °F (°C)	−1.8 (−18.8)	0.8 (−17.3)	8.4 (−13.1)	23.9 (−4.5)	31.8 (−0.1)	42.6 (5.9)	51.2 (10.7)	48.1 (8.9)	37.4 (3.0)	26.8 (−2.9)	17.4 (−8.1)	6.8 (−14.0)	−4.1 (−20.1)
Record low °F (°C)	−21 (−29)	−17 (−27)	−4 (−20)	9 (−13)	24 (−4)	36 (2)	41 (5)	36 (2)	22 (−6)	19 (−7)	−2 (−19)	−19 (−28)	−21 (−29)
Average precipitation inches (mm)	3.53 (90)	3.59 (91)	4.80 (122)	4.29 (109)	4.08 (104)	4.23 (107)	3.55 (90)	3.76 (96)	4.01 (102)	5.32 (135)	3.90 (99)	4.52 (115)	49.58 (1,260)
Average snowfall inches (cm)	16.2 (41)	15.6 (40)	11.9 (30)	1.8 (4.6)	0.0 (0.0)	0.0 (0.0)	0.0 (0.0)	0.0 (0.0)	0.0 (0.0)	0.1 (0.25)	1.4 (3.6)	10.8 (27)	57.8 (146.45)
Average extreme snow depth inches (cm)	9.4 (24)	9.7 (25)	9.5 (24)	1.2 (3.0)	0.0 (0.0)	0.0 (0.0)	0.0 (0.0)	0.0 (0.0)	0.0 (0.0)	0.1 (0.25)	1.1 (2.8)	7.1 (18)	16.0 (41)
Average precipitation days (≥ 0.01 in)	10.6	9.7	11.4	12.0	12.8	11.4	10.0	9.4	9.3	11.5	10.9	11.5	130.5
Average snowy days (≥ 0.1 in)	5.8	5.4	3.7	0.6	0.0	0.0	0.0	0.0	0.0	0.0	0.7	4.0	20.2
Source 1: NOAA
Source 2: National Weather Service

=== Geology ===
The overall terrain within Haverhill is heavily influenced by various glacial formations. With drumlins, moraines, eskers, glacial erratics, and kettle ponds being common. Gravel mining operations are conducted along eskers and glacial deposits of readily accessible gravel.

Much of the soil within Haverhill is consolidated glacial till; inceptisols with moderate pedological development being the most common, as well as spodosols seen within the coniferous forests local to the area. Various fluvial deposits can be seen surrounding the river banks of the Merrimack and its tributaries.

The river systems within Haverhill have also been heavily altered by glacial activity, with drainage patterns being inconsistent and variable. Because of this inconsistency, and examples of each drainage pattern in some capacity being observable, streams and rivers within Haverhill would be classified as having a deranged drainage pattern.

Within close proximity of the Clinton-Newbury fault line, the bedrock topography of Haverhill is part of the Berwick Formation, consisting of metasandstone quartzite and sulfuric mica schists dating from the Silurian period. However other metamorphic rocks such as gneiss and shale are relatively common. Granite, feldspars, and other igneous silicates are also abundant.

=== Points of interest ===
- Main Street Historic District
- Museum of Printing
- Winnekenni Park Conservation Area, including Winnekenni Castle and Lake Saltonstall

== Demographics ==
Historical population
Year	Pop.	±%
1790	2,408	—
1800	2,730	+13.4%
1810	2,682	−1.8%
1820	3,070	+14.5%
1830	3,896	+26.9%
1840	4,336	+11.3%
1850	5,877	+35.5%
1860	9,995	+70.1%
1870	13,092	+31.0%
1880	18,472	+41.1%
1890	27,412	+48.4%
1900	37,175	+35.6%
1910	44,115	+18.7%
1920	53,884	+22.1%
1930	48,710	−9.6%
1940	46,752	−4.0%
1950	47,280	+1.1%
1960	46,346	−2.0%
1970	46,120	−0.5%
1980	46,865	+1.6%
1990	51,418	+9.7%
2000	58,969	+14.7%
2010	60,879	+3.2%
2020	67,787	+11.3%
2024*	68,291	+0.7%
* = population estimate. Source: United States census records and Population Estimates Program data. Source: U.S. Decennial Census

=== 2020 census ===
As of the 2020 census, Haverhill had a population of 67,787. The median age was 39.7 years. 21.0% of residents were under the age of 18 and 15.6% of residents were 65 years of age or older. For every 100 females there were 92.9 males, and for every 100 females age 18 and over there were 90.2 males age 18 and over.

98.2% of residents lived in urban areas, while 1.8% lived in rural areas.

There were 26,696 households in Haverhill, of which 29.6% had children under the age of 18 living in them. Of all households, 40.6% were married-couple households, 18.7% were households with a male householder and no spouse or partner present, and 31.0% were households with a female householder and no spouse or partner present. About 29.1% of all households were made up of individuals and 11.2% had someone living alone who was 65 years of age or older.

There were 27,927 housing units, of which 4.4% were vacant. The homeowner vacancy rate was 0.8% and the rental vacancy rate was 4.7%.

Racial composition as of the 2020 census
Race	Number	Percent
White	47,629	70.3%
Black or African American	3,094	4.6%
American Indian and Alaska Native	303	0.4%
Asian	1,331	2.0%
Native Hawaiian and Other Pacific Islander	29	0.0%
Some other race	8,732	12.9%
Two or more races	6,669	9.8%
Hispanic or Latino (of any race)	15,998	23.6%

=== 2010 census ===
As of the 2010 census, there were 60,879 people, 25,576 households, and 14,865 families residing in the city. The population density was 1,846.5 inhabitants per square mile (712.9/km^{2}). There were 23,737 housing units at an average density of 712.2 per square mile (275.0/km^{2}). The racial makeup of the city was 88.3% White, 4.5% African American, 0.3% Native American, 1.6% Asian, 0.03% Pacific Islander, 4.30% from other races, and 2.6% from two or more races. Hispanic or Latino made up 14.5% of the population (5.8% Puerto Rican, 4.6% Dominican, 0.9% Mexican, 0.5% Guatemalan, 0.3% Salvadoran, 0.3% Colombian, 0.2% Cuban).

=== 2000 census ===
According to the 2000 census, there were 22,976 households, out of which 33.0% had children under the age of 18 living with them, 47.0% were married couples living together, 13.4% had a female householder with no husband present, and 35.3% were non-families. 28.6% of all households were made up of individuals, and 10.3% had someone living alone who was 65 years of age or older. The average household size was 2.51 and the average family size was 3.11.

The population was spread out, with 25.7% under the age of 18, 7.7% from 18 to 24, 33.5% from 25 to 44, 20.4% from 45 to 64, and 12.8% who were 65 years of age or older. The median age was 36 years. For every 100 females, there were 90.3 males. For every 100 females age 18 and over, there were 85.7 males.

16.8% were of Irish, 14.6% Italian, 10.1% French, 9.0% English, 7.8% French Canadian and 6.3% American ancestry according to Census 2000.

The median income for a household in the city was $49,833, and the median income for a family was $59,772. Males had a median income of $41,197 versus $31,779 for females. The per capita income for the city was $23,280. About 7.0% of families and 9.1% of the population were below the poverty line, including 12.3% of those under age 18 and 10.0% of those age 65 or over.

=== Crime ===
Haverhill
- Crime rates* (2020)

Violent crimes
- Homicide: 2
- Rape: 11
- Robbery: 19
- Aggravated assault: 272
- Total violent crime: 304

Property crimes
- Burglary: 144
- Larceny-theft: 411
- Motor vehicle theft: 83
- Arson: 6
- Total property crime: 638
- Note: Reported crimes per 100,000 population Source: 2020 FBI UCR Data

In 2019, Haverhill's violent crime rate per 100,000 inhabitants was higher than the average rate of violent crime in both the state of Massachusetts and the nation as a whole. The rate of violent crime in Haverhill has declined in the past several years, however, from a recent peak of 391 in 2017 to a low of 304 in 2020.

== Government ==
City government

Haverhill operates under a mayor–council form of government. The current mayor is Melinda Barrett, who has been mayor of Haverhill since 2024, and is currently serving a second term. She is the first female mayor of Haverhill. The city council has nine members, elected every two years. The most recent election was in 2025.

State representation

Haverhill is represented in the state legislature by officials elected from the following districts:

- Massachusetts Senate's 1st Essex district.
- Massachusetts House of Representatives' 2nd Essex district
- Massachusetts House of Representatives' 3rd Essex district
- Massachusetts House of Representatives' 14th Essex district
- Massachusetts House of Representatives' 15th Essex district

== Education ==
Haverhill is the home of the main campus of Northern Essex Community College. Until its closing in 2000, Bradford College provided liberal arts higher education in Haverhill. In 2007, it became the new home of the Zion Bible College, now called Northpoint Bible College. The University of Massachusetts Lowell offers several courses supplementary to existing courses at Northern Essex Community College. Haverhill completed the reconstruction of the Hunking Middle School in the Bradford part of the city. Haverhill is also home to the historic Walnut Square School, first built in 1898 at a cost of $30,000 (~$962,762 in 2024). The city is currently working on constructing a new campus for the Dr. A.B. Consentino Middle School, replacing the existing building.

The school's tower clock was created by Mr. Edward Howard, a famous clock maker of the 1890s, at a cost of $1,300.

Public schools in the city are operated by the Haverhill Public Schools District. The city is also home to Whittier Regional Vocational Technical School District, which operates its only school: Whittier Regional Vocational Technical High School, a trade-school which takes students by lottery from Haverhill and surrounding areas, and Hill View Montessori Charter Public School. This is a K-8 school which also takes students by lottery. It currently serves 306 students.

== Infrastructure ==
=== Transportation ===
Haverhill lies along Interstate 495, which has five exits throughout the city. The town is crossed by five state routes, including Routes 97, 108, 110, 113 and 125. Routes 108 and 125 both have their northern termini at the New Hampshire state border, where both continue as New Hampshire state routes. Four of the five state routes, except Route 108, share at least a portion of their roadways in the town with each other. Haverhill is the site of six road crossings and a rail crossing of the Merrimack; two by I-495 (the first leading into Methuen), the Comeau Bridge (Railroad Avenue, which leads to the Bradford MBTA station), the Haverhill/Reading Line Railroad Bridge, the Basiliere Bridge (Rte. 125/Bridge St.), the Bates Bridge (Rtes. 97/113 to Groveland), and the Rocks Village Bridge, to West Newbury, just south of the Merrimac town line. In 2010, a project began to replace the Bates Bridge, 60 feet (18 m) downstream, with a modern bridge. The project is expected to take two to three years and cost approximately $45 million.

MBTA Commuter Rail provides service from Boston's North Station with the Haverhill and Bradford stations on its Haverhill/Reading Line. Amtrak provides service to Portland, Maine, and Boston's North Station from the same Haverhill station. Additionally, MeVa Transit provides local bus service to Haverhill and beyond. The nearest small-craft airport, Lawrence Municipal Airport, is in North Andover. The nearest major airport is Manchester-Boston Regional Airport in Manchester, and the nearest international airport is Logan International Airport in Boston.

Broadband internet service is provided by Comcast Communications (Xfinity) throughout the majority of the city. Atlantic Broadband also provides its Breezeline internet service, but still in limited areas as of 2024.

== Notable people ==
- John Mapes Adams, Medal of Honor recipient during the Boxer Rebellion
- Mabel Albertson (1901–1982), actress
- Louis Alter (1902–1980), songwriter ("Do You Know What It Means to Miss New Orleans?")
- Daniel Appleton (1785–1849), publisher
- William Henry Appleton (1814–1899), Daniel Appleton's son, publisher of Lewis Carroll, Arthur Conan Doyle, Charles Darwin, Thomas Henry Huxley, Herbert Spencer, and John Stuart Mill
- Gerald Ashworth (born 1942), track athlete and Olympic gold medal winner
- Bailey Bartlett (1750–1830), member of the United States Constitutional Convention
- Alexander Graham Bell (1847–1922), Scottish-born inventor, who spent considerable time in Haverhill initially as a tutor to the deaf son of a prominent shoe magnate who later invested in Bell's telephone concept
- John Bellairs (1938–1991), author of gothic horror fiction for children and young adults
- William Berenberg (1915–2005), Harvard University professor and pediatrician
- Tom Bergeron (born 1955), television personality, comedian, and game show host.
- Peter Breck (1929–2012), actor
- Isaac Newton Carleton (1832–1902), educator
- Walter Tenney Carleton (1867–1900), businessman
- Stuart Chase (1888–1985), economist
- Tristram Coffin, among the town's first settlers, who later left to settle Nantucket
- Russ Conway (1949–2019), investigative journalist and Elmer Ferguson Memorial Award recipient
- David Crouse, writer
- Andre Dubus III (born 1959), novelist and short story writer
- Hannah Duston (1657–1736), colonial heroine, first woman in the United States to be honored with a statue
- Frank Fontaine (1920–1978), comedian, Crazy Guggenheim on The Jackie Gleason Show
- Jeff Fraza, boxer and contestant on reality television show The Contender
- Charlotte Fullerton, author and Emmy-winning children's television writer/producer
- Jordan Harris (born 2000), NHL hockey player for the Montreal Canadiens
- Moses Hazen (1733–1803), Continental Army general
- Sylvia Hitchcock, Miss Alabama USA 1967, Miss USA 1967, Miss Universe 1967
- Red Howard (1900–1973), football player
- Duncan MacDougall, physician whose studies inspired the film 21 Grams
- Rowland H. Macy (1822–1877), merchant
- Louis Burt Mayer (1884–1957) American film producer and co-founder of Metro-Goldwyn-Mayer studios (MGM)
- Karen McCarthy, Missouri politician
- Charles Minot (1810–1866), railroad executive at Erie Railroad
- Bob Montana, Archie Comics co-creator
- William Henry Moody (1853–1917), Supreme Court justice, and prosecutor in the Lizzie Borden trial
- Carlos Peña, Major League Baseball player
- John F. Pingry, Presbyterian minister and educator
- Anthony Purpura (born 1986), USA Rugby National Team player
- Effie Alberta Read (c. 1873–1930), scientist at the US Food and Drug Administration
- Stephen Robert (born 1940), former chairman and CEO of Oppenheimer & Co., former Chancellor of Brown University
- Seth Romatelli, actor, host of Uhh Yeah Dude
- James E. Rothman, notable cell biologist and Nobel Prize winner
- Joseph Ruskin (1924–2013), né Joseph Richard Schlafman, actor, had roles in four Star Trek series and films including The Magnificent Seven and Prizzi's Honor
- Mike Ryan, Major League Baseball player
- Nathaniel Saltonstall (1639–1707), judge at the Salem witch trials
- Jon Shain (born 1967), folk musician
- Spider One, née Michael Cummings, musician, brother of Robert Cummings a.k.a. Rob Zombie
- Charles Augustus Strong (1862–1940), philosopher, of the American school of critical realism
- Noah Vonleh, professional basketball player, formerly of the Boston Celtics
- John Greenleaf Whittier (1807–1892), poet; his poem Snow-Bound is set in Haverhill
- Charlotte White (1782–1863), first unmarried American woman missionary, arrived in India 1816
- Rob Zombie (born 1965), born Robert Cummings, musician and founding member of White Zombie, film director, mainly in the horror genre.

== See also ==
- List of mill towns in Massachusetts

== Bibliography ==
- The Story of Hannah Dustin
- "The Great Fire at Haverhill" from The New York Times archive
- "Haverhill's Great Loss" from The New York Times archive
- Disaster Genealogy - The Haverhill FireArchived 2014-11-29 at the Wayback Machine

Published in 19th century

- Mirick, B L (1832). History of Haverhill. Haverhill: A W Thayer.
- Jeremiah Spofford (1860), "Haverhill", Historical and Statistical Gazetteer of Massachusetts (2nd ed.), Haverhill: E.G. Frothingham
- George Wingate Chase (1861), History of Haverhill, Massachusetts, Haverhill: Pub. by the author, OCLC 11267735, OL 13557017M
- "Haverhill Business Directory". Merrimack River Directory, for 1872 & 1873. Boston: Greenough, Jones. 1872.
- Elias Nason (1874), "Haverhill", Gazetteer of the State of Massachusetts, Boston: B.B. Russell, OCLC 1728892
- Haverhill: Foundation Facts, Haverhill, Mass: Bridgman & Gay, 1879, OCLC 7188408
- Haverhill - Facts of Interest (1880).
- Benjamin L. Mirick (1882), History of Haverhill, Massachusetts, Haverhill: A. W. Thayer, OCLC 6697842, OL 6905779M
- "City of Haverhill", Industries of Massachusetts, New York: International Pub. Co., 1886, OCLC 19803267
- Haverhill, Massachusetts: an Industrial and Commercial Center, Haverhill, Mass: Board of Trade, 1889, OCLC 11378334, OL 13490085M
- White, Daniel (1889). The Descendants of William White, of Haverhill, Mass.

Published in 20th century

- Haverhill and Groveland Directory. Boston: Price & Lee. 1902.
- Thomas, Samuel (1904). Whittier-land: A Handbook of North Essex.
- Haverhill (Mass.). Board of Trade. (1905), History of the City of Haverhill, Massachusetts, Haverhill, OCLC 5042345, OL 6603655M
- Charles A. Flagg (1907), "Essex County: Haverhill", Guide to Massachusetts Local History, Salem, Mass.: Salem Press
- Chisholm, Hugh, ed. (1911), "Haverhill" , Encyclopædia Britannica, vol. 13 (11th ed.), Cambridge University Press, p. 81
- "Haverhill, Mass.", Automobile Blue Book, Automobile Blue Book Publishing Co., 1917, OCLC 7442840, OL 23461025M
- Arrington, Benjamin F. (1922). Municipal History of Essex County in Massachusetts. Volume 2 - Haverhill. Volume 3 Biographical. Volume 4 Biographical. New York: Lewis Historical Publishing Company.
- Charles A. Richmond (1922), Haverhill Strangers' Directory, Haverhill, Mass: Telegram Press, OL 24157599M
- Federal Writers' Project (1937), "Haverhill", Massachusetts: a Guide to its Places and People, American Guide Series, Boston: Houghton Mifflin, hdl:2027/mdp.39015014440781

published in 21st century

- Regan, Shawn, "Literary Haunts", Eagle-Tribune, October 22, 2006
